= List of writers from British Columbia =

The Canadian province of British Columbia has produced writers across a wide variety of genres. This list includes notable writers who were born in British Columbia or spent a significant portion of their writing career living in British Columbia.

== A ==
- Jordan Abel (living), poet
- Ken Adachi (1929–1989)
- Steve J. Adams (living), screenwriter
- Barbara Adler (living), poet
- Carmen Aguirre (living), memoirist
- Kelley Aitken (living), short story writer
- Neil Aitken (born 1974), poet
- Susan Louisa Moir Allison (1845–1937)
- Gail Anderson-Dargatz (born 1963), novelist
- Ruth apRoberts (1919–2006), non-fiction writer
- Kate Armstrong (born 1962), memoirist
- Kate Armstrong (living), non-fiction writer
- Daniel Arnold (living), screenwriter
- Joanne Arnott (born 1960), poet
- Diana Atkinson (living), novelist
- Karen Autio (living), children's writer
- Jonathan Auxier (born 1981), novelist

== B ==
- Mette Bach (living), novelist, essayist
- Unity Bainbridge (1916–2017), poet
- Irene Baird (1901–1981), novelist, journalist
- Carleigh Baker (living), short story writer
- Andrea Bang (born 1989), screenwriter
- Trisha Baptie (born 1973), journalist
- James Barber (1923–2007), cookbook writer
- Michelle Barker (born 1964), poet, novelist
- Bill Barlee (1932–2012), non-fiction writer
- Gurjinder Basran (born 1972), novelist
- Andrew Battershill (living), novelist
- Claire Battershill (living), short story writer
- Doug Beardsley (born 1941), poet
- Richard Beattie (living), screenwriter
- Richard Bell (living), screenwriter
- Danielle Bennett (living), novelist
- Matthew Bennett (born 1968), screenwriter
- Sonja Bennett (born 1980), screenwriter
- David Bergen (born 1957), novelist
- Jonathan Berry (born 1953), non-fiction writer
- Gregory Betts (born 1975), poet
- Earle Birney (1904–1995), poet
- Bill Bissett (born 1939), poet
- Arthur Black (1943–2018), humorist
- Ann Blades (born 1947), children's writer
- Cassandra Blanchard (living), poet
- Francis John Blatherwick (born 1944), non-fiction writer
- Lance Blomgren (born 1970), short story writer, essayist
- Ali Blythe (living), poet
- Selina Boan (living), poet
- Columpa Bobb (born 1971), playwright, poet
- Andrew Boden (living), novelist
- Dennis E. Bolen (living), novelist, poet, journalist
- Michael Boncoeur (living), screenwriter
- Linwood Boomer (born 1955), screenwriter
- Phillip Borsos (1953–1995), screenwriter
- David Boswell (born 1953), comic book writer
- Eddy Boudel Tan (living), novelist
- Jason Bourque (born 1972), screenwriter
- Cedar Bowers (living), novelist
- Elisabeth Bowers (born 1949), novelist
- Tim Bowling (born 1964), novelist, poet
- Kate Braid (born 1947), poet
- Brian Brett (1950–2024), poet, journalist, novelist
- Robert Bringhurst (born 1946), poet, non-fiction writer
- Baba Brinkman (born 1978), playwright
- Audrey Alexandra Brown (1904–1998), poet
- Lorna Brown (born 1958), non-fiction writer
- Aaron Bushkowsky (born 1957), poet

== C ==
- Todd Caldecott (living), non-fiction writer
- Anne Cameron (1938–2022), novelist, poet, screenwriter
- Nicola I. Campbell (living), poet, children's writer
- Siobhan Carroll (born 1980), non-fiction writer, short story writer
- Marjorie Celona (born 1981), novelist
- Elizabeth Chater (1910–2004), novelist, poet
- Arthur Murray Chisholm (1871–1960), novelist
- Corinna Chong (living), novelist
- Denise Chong (living), non-fiction writer
- Kevin Chong (living), novelist
- Wayson Choy (1939–2019), novelist
- Michael Christie (living), novelist, short story writer
- Jillian Christmas (living), poet
- Jessica Clark-Bojin (living), food writer
- Brian Clement (born 1977), screenwriter
- Marie Clements (born 1962), playwright, screenwriter
- Sperry Cline (1881–1964)
- Janis Cole (born 1954), screenwriter
- Katherine Collins (born 1947), comics writer
- Wayde Compton (born 1972), poet, essayist, short story writer
- Michael G. Coney (1932–2005), novelist
- Christopher Cook (living), playwright
- Beverley Cooper (living), playwright
- Judith Copithorne (1939–2025), poet
- Claudia Maria Cornwall (born 1948), journalist, non-fiction writer
- Panos Cosmatos (born 1974), screenwriter
- Douglas Coupland (born 1961), novelist
- Bernard Cowan (1922–1990), screenwriter
- Janice Cowan (living), novelist
- Carys Cragg (living), non-fiction writer
- Jennifer Craig (1934–2023), novelist, memoirist
- Brian Lee Crowley (born 1955), non-fiction writer
- Nancy Jo Cullen (living), poet, novelist
- Raymond Culos (born 1936), non-fiction writer
- Seán Cummings (living), playwright
- Andrew Currie (living), screenwriter
- Jen Currin (living), poet, short story writer
- Kayla Czaga (born 1989), poet

== D ==
- Brenda Damen (born 1960), short story writer
- Joseph A. Dandurand (living), poet, playwright
- Jack Darcus (born 1941), screenwriter
- Dakota Daulby (born 1994), screenwriter
- Jill Daum (living), playwright
- Frank Davey (born 1940), poet
- TJ Dawe (born 1974), playwright
- David Day (born 1947), poet, children's writer
- Sarah de Leeuw (born 1973), poet, non-fiction writer
- Anne DeGrace (living), novelist
- Don DeBrandt (living), novelist
- Barbara Delaplace (1952–2022), novelist, short story writer
- Charles Demers (born 1980), novelist, essayist
- Joe Denham (living), poet, novelist
- Darrell Dennis (living), screenwriter
- Patrick deWitt (born 1975), novelist, screenwriter
- Ranj Dhaliwal (living), novelist
- Ned Dickens (born 1959), playwright
- Don Dickinson (born 1947), novelist, short story writer
- Dorothy Dittrich (living), playwright
- Sandra Djwa (born 1939), non-fiction writer
- Tamas Dobozy (living), short story writer
- Gilean Douglas (1900–1993), nature writer
- Thomas Y. Drake (1936–2008), screenwriter
- John Duffie (1913–1989), humorist, columnist
- Dave Duncan (writer) (1933–2018), novelist
- Sandy Frances Duncan (living), novelist, short story writer

== E ==
- Esi Edugyan (born 1978), novelist
- Kris Elgstrand (living), screenwriter
- Sarah Ellis (born 1952), children's writer
- Robert Elsie (1950–2017), non-fiction writer
- John T. Elson (1931–2009), non-fiction writer
- Crispin Elsted (born 1947), poet
- Marina Endicott (born 1958), novelist, short story writer
- Mercedes Eng (living), poet
- Yves Engler (born 1979), non-fiction writer
- Karen Enns (living), poet
- Josh Epstein (living), screenwriter
- Pasha Eshghi (born 1992), screenwriter
- Robin Esrock (born 1974), travel writer
- Hubert Evans (1892–1986), novelist
- Stanley Evans (born 1931), novelist, playwright

== F ==
- M. A. C. Farrant (born 1947), short story writer, journalist
- Chad Faust (born 1980), screenwriter
- Brian Fawcett (1944–2022), non-fiction writer
- James Fell (born 1968), non-fiction writer
- Raoul Fernandes (living), poet
- Nigel Findley (1959–1995), novelist
- Patricia Finn (living), screenwriter and novelist
- Rand Flem-Ath (born 1949), non-fiction writer
- Edward Taylor Fletcher (1817–1897), poet, memoirist, travel writer, essayist
- Julie Flett (living), children's writer
- Diana Frances (living), playwright, screenwriter
- Daniel Francis (born 1947), historian
- Keath Fraser (born 1944), novelist
- Tzvi Freeman (living), non-fiction writer
- Kim Fu (born 1987), novelist
- Pik-Shuen Fung (living), novelist
- Kevan Funk (living), screenwriter
- Nicola Furlong (living), novelist

== G ==
- Rhonda Ganz (living), poet
- C. E. Gatchalian (born 1974), playwright
- Daniel Gawthrop (born 1963), journalist, novelist
- Andrew George Jr. (living), cookbook writer
- Leonard George (born 1957), non-fiction writer
- Rueben George (living), non-fiction writer
- Chantal Gibson (living), poet
- Gerry Gilbert (1936–2009), poet
- Charlotte Gill (living), short story writer, non-fiction writer
- Barry M. Gough (born 1938), historian
- Monique Gray Smith (born 1968), children's writer, novelist
- R. W. Gray (living), short story writer, screenwriter
- John Greyson (born 1960), screenwriter
- G. A. Grisenthwaite (living), novelist
- Sara Gruen (born 1969), novelist
- Stephen Guppy (born 1951), short story writer, poet
- David Gurr (born 1936), novelist
- Paula Gustafson (1941–2006), non-fiction writer

== H ==
- Ian Hacking (1936–2023), philosopher
- Chris Haddock (living), screenwriter
- Joan Haggerty (born 1940), novelist
- Medina Hahn (living), playwright
- Valerie Haig-Brown (born 1936), non-fiction writer
- Amanda K. Hale (living), novelist, playwright, short story writer
- Meredith Hama-Brown (living), screenwriter
- Robyn Harding (living), novelist
- Maureen Scott Harris (born 1943), poet
- Michael John Harris (born 1980), non-fiction writer, journalist
- Nadine Burke Harris (born 1975), non-fiction writer
- Diana Hartog (born 1942), poet, novelist
- Kim Senklip Harvey (living), playwright
- Alix Hawley (born 1975), novelist, short story writer
- Gwen Haworth (born 1972), screenwriter
- Tara Singh Hayer (1936–1998), journalist
- Titus Heckel (living), screenwriter
- John Hemming (born 1935), historian
- Lee Henderson (living), novelist, short story writer
- Faith Erin Hicks (living), comics writer
- Gord Hill (born 1968), novelist
- Daryl Hine (1936–2012), poet
- Richmond P. Hobson Jr. (1907–1966), non-fiction writer
- Bryce Hodgson (born 1989), playwright
- Clive Holden (living), poet
- Pauline Holdstock (living), novelist, essayist, short story writer
- Thomas Homer-Dixon (born 1956), non-fiction writer
- Cornelia Hoogland (living), poet, playwright
- Zoe Leigh Hopkins (living), screenwriter
- Leah Horlick (living), poet
- Sean Horlor (born 1981), poet, screenwriter
- Polly Horvath (born 1957), novelist
- Jono Howard (living), screenwriter
- Nazanine Hozar (born 1978), novelist
- Andrew Huculiak (living), screenwriter
- Raymond Hull (writer) (1919–1985), playwright, screenwriter
- Jack Humphrey (1932–1987), screenwriter
- Mervyn Huston (1912–2001), novelist, humorist
- Robert Hilles (born 1951), poet and novelist

== I ==
- George K. Ilsley (born 1958), novelist, short story writer
- Benjamin Immanuel (living), screenwriter
- John Ince (born 1952), non-fiction writer
- Dorothy Inglis (1926–2013), non-fiction writer
- Karen Irving (living), novelist
- Brian Thomas Isaac (born 1950), novelist

== J ==
- E. A. Jenns (1860–1930), poet
- Wanda John-Kehewin (living), poet, novelist
- Becky Johnson (born 1978)
- Denys Johnson-Davies (born 1922), translator
- Sean Johnston (living), novelist, short story writer
- Bob Joseph (born 1963), non-fiction writer
- Susan Juby (born 1969), novelist

== K ==
- Joseph Kakwinokanasum (living), novelist
- Harry Kambolis (born 1968), cookbook writer
- Hiro Kanagawa (born 1963), playwright
- Donna Kane (living), poet
- Alireza Kazemipour (born 1973), screenwriter
- Kaie Kellough (born 1975), poet, novelist
- Ron Kelly (born 1929), screenwriter
- Roberta Kennedy, children's writer
- Michael Kenyon (born 1953), novelist, poet
- Kevin Kerr (born 1968), playwright
- Ronald Kirkbride (1912–1973), novelist
- Marcus Kliewer, horror novelist and short story writer
- Chelene Knight (living), poet, novelist
- Rolf Knight (1936–2019), historian
- Joy Kogawa (born 1935), poet, novelist
- Graham Kolbeins (living), screenwriter
- Jules Koostachin (living), poet, screenwriter
- Shane Koyczan (born 1976), poet
- Betty Krawczyk (1928–2025)
- Monica Kulling (living), children's writer
- Tima Kurdi (born 1970), memoirist
- Lydia Kwa (born 1959), novelist, short story writer, poet
- Tanya Lloyd Kyi (living), children's writer, novelist

== L ==
- Robert T. Lackey (born 1944), non-fiction writer
- Myriam Lacroix (living), novelist
- Angélique Lalonde (living), short story writer
- Tsering Yangzom Lama (living), novelist
- Shaena Lambert (born 1959), novelist, short story writer
- Tim Lander (1938–2023), poet
- Curtis Earle Lang (1937–1998), poet
- Jason Lapeyre (living), screenwriter
- Evelyn Lau (born 1971), novelist, poet, short story writer
- Owen Laukkanen (born 1983), novelist
- Grant Lawrence (born 1971), non-fiction writer
- Julie Lawson (born 1947), non-fiction writer
- D. M. LeBourdais (1887–1964), non-fiction writer
- Rachel Lebowitz (born 1975), biographer
- Amanda Leduc (living), novelist
- JJ Lee (living), non-fiction writer
- Jen Sookfong Lee (born 1976), novelist
- Sky Lee (born 1952), novelist
- Lily Alice Lefevre (1854–1938), poet
- Mark Leiren-Young (born 1962), playwright, journalist, screenwriter
- John Lent (living), poet, novelist
- Cyril Edel Leonoff (1925–2016), historian
- Alex Leslie (living), poet, short story writer
- Robyn Michele Levy (born 1964), comics writer
- Jeff L. Lieberman (living), screenwriter
- Wendy Lill (born 1950), playwright, screenwriter
- Charles Lillard (1944–1997), poet, historian
- Tracey Lindberg (living), novelist, non-fiction writer
- Ashley Little (born 1983), novelist
- Billie Livingston (living), novelist, short story writer, essayist, poet
- Seth Lochhead (born 1981), screenwriter
- James Long (living), playwright
- Matthew Long (born 1982), screenwriter
- Kevin Loring (born 1974), playwright
- Pat Lowther (1935–1975), poet
- Graham Ludlow (living), screenwriter
- Frieda Luk (living), screenwriter
- Annabel Lyon (born 1971), novelist, short story writer
- Eswyn Lyster (1923–2009), non-fiction writer
- Sonnet L'Abbé (born 1973), poet

== M ==
- Carrie Mac (born 1975), novelist
- Tom MacInnes (1867–1951), poet
- Trevor Mack (born 1992), screenwriter
- Michael MacLennan (born 1968), playwright, screenwriter
- Andrea MacPherson (born 1976), poet, novelist
- Rick Maddocks (born 1970), short story writer
- Robert Majzels (born 1950), novelist, poet, playwright
- Nathalie Mallet (living), novelist
- Emily St. John Mandel (born 1979), novelist, essayist
- Graeme Manson (living), screenwriter
- Jennifer Manuel (born 1971), novelist, short story writer
- Margaret Manuel (living), children's writer
- Lee Maracle (1950–2021), novelist, poet, non-fiction writer
- Daphne Marlatt (born 1942), poet, novelist
- Anne Marriott (1913–1997), poet
- Garth Martens (living), poet
- Elan Mastai (living), screenwriter, novelist
- Robin Mathews (1931–2023), poet
- Blake Mawson (born 1984), screenwriter
- John H. McArthur (1934–2019), non-fiction writer
- Christopher John McCabe (born 1967), novelist
- Susan McCaslin (born 1947), poet
- Pete McCormack (born 1965), novelist, screenwriter
- Drew McCreadie (born 1967)
- James Benjamin McCullagh (1854–1921)
- Evah McKowan (1885–1962), novelist
- Dan McLeod (born 1943), journalist, poet
- Margaret McNaughton (1856–1915), non-fiction writer
- Florence McNeil (c. 1932–2013), poet, novelist, playwright
- William H. McNeill (1917–2016), historian
- Christopher Meades (living), novelist
- Karen Miller (living), novelist
- Sarah Milroy (born 1957), non-fiction writer
- Yasmine Mohammed (living), memoirist
- Charles Montgomery (born 1968), travel writer
- Shani Mootoo (living), novelist
- Silvia Moreno-Garcia (born 1981), novelist, short story writer
- Garry Thomas Morse (living), poet, novelist
- Johnny Moses (living), storyteller
- Tara Moss (born 1973), novelist, non-fiction writer
- Claire Mulligan (living), novelist, short story writer
- Jane Munro (born 1943), poet
- Janet Munsil (living), playwright
- Sachiko Murakami (born 1980), poet
- Melanie Murray (living), novelist

== N ==
- Hasan Namir (born 1987), novelist, poet
- Jen Neale (living), novelist
- Aubrey Nealon (born 1971), screenwriter
- David Neel (born 1960), non-fiction writer
- John Nesbitt (1910–1960), screenwriter
- Claire Newell (living), travel writer
- John Newlove (1938–2003), poet
- Barbara Nichol (living), screenwriter
- Chani Nicholas (born 1975), astrologer
- Cecily Nicholson (born 1974), poet
- Billeh Nickerson (born 1972), poet, essayist
- Eric Nicol (1919–2011), humorist
- Fraser Nixon (living), novelist
- Chad Norman (born c. 1958), poet
- Mary Novik (living), novelist

== O ==
- Alexandra Oliver (born 1970), poet
- Sean Harris Oliver (living), playwright
- Sylvia Olsen (living), novelist, non-fiction writer
- Taylor Olson (born 1992), screenwriter
- Kenneth Oppel (born 1967), children's writer
- David Oppenheimer (1834–1897)
- Sean Orr (born 1978), columnist
- Bud Osborn (1947–2014), poet
- Stephen Osborne (born 1947), non-fiction writer

== P ==
- P. K. Page (1916–2010), poet
- Arleen Paré (born 1946), poet, novelist
- Susan Parisi (born 1958), novelist
- Molly Parker (born 1972), screenwriter
- Kevin Patterson (born 1964), novelist, short story writer, non-fiction writer
- Philip Kevin Paul (living), poet
- Corey Payette (born 1987), screenwriter
- Loghan Paylor (living), novelist
- Lawrence Pazder (1936–2004), non-fiction writer
- Kit Pearson (born 1947), novelist
- Jonnie Penn (born 1987), non-fiction writer
- Marc Perez (living), poet
- Cea Sunrise Person (born 1969), memoirist
- Laurence J. Peter (1919–1990), non-fiction writer
- Bradley Peters (living), poet
- Zoey Leigh Peterson (living), novelist
- Holly Phillips (born 1969), novelist
- Wendy Phillips (living), children's writer
- Hazel Jane Plante (living), novelist
- C. L. Polk (born 1969), novelist
- Pamela Porter (born 1956), novelist, poet
- Helen Potrebenko (1940–2022), non-fiction writer
- Christine Pountney (born 1971), novelist
- Lily Hoy Price (1930–2021), memoirist
- Marguerite-A. Primeau (1914–2011), novelist, short story writer
- Kate Pullinger (living), novelist
- Al Purdy (1918–2000), poet

== Q ==
- Andy Quan (born 1969), poet, short story writer
- Marion Quednau (born 1952), novelist, poet
- Christine Quintana (living), playwright

== R ==
- Sheri Radford (living), children's writer
- Lisa C. Ravensbergen (living), playwright
- Ryan Redford (living), screenwriter
- Roberta Rees (born 1954), poet
- D. C. Reid (born 1952), poet, novelist, short story writer
- Raziel Reid (living), novelist
- Maria Reva (living), short story writer
- Linda L. Richards (living), novelist
- Eliza Robertson (living), short story writer
- Eden Robinson (born 1968), novelist, short story writer
- J. Jill Robinson (born 1955), novelist, short story writer
- Barbara Roden (born 1963), novelist
- Linda Rogers (born 1944), poet, children's writer
- Steve Rolston (born 1978), comics writer
- Sophy Romvari (born 1990), screenwriter
- Rachel Rose (born 1970), poet, essayist, short story writer
- Joe Rosenblatt (1933–2019), poet
- Laisha Rosnau (born 1972), novelist, poet
- Hugh Ross (born 1945), non-fiction writer
- Andrea Routley (living), short story writer
- Holley Rubinsky (1943–2015), novelist
- Joe Ruelle (born 1978), blogger
- Harley Rustad (living), journalist, non-fiction writer
- Naben Ruthnum (living), novelist, essayist
- Jhet van Ruyven (born 1959), autobiographer

== S ==
- Ziyad Saadi (living), novelist, screenwriter
- Andrew Sabiston (born 1965), screenwriter
- Susan Sanford Blades (living), novelist, short story writer
- Mark Sawers (living), screenwriter
- Arthur Scaife (c. 1855–1934), novelist, short story writer
- David Scearce (living), screenwriter
- Anakana Schofield (born 1971), novelist
- Adam Lewis Schroeder (living), novelist, short story writer
- Andreas Schroeder (born 1946), poet, novelist, non-fiction writer
- Gregory Scofield (born 1966), poet, non-fiction writer
- Amber Scorah (living), non-fiction writer
- Jordan Scott (born 1978), poet
- Jasmine Sealy (living), novelist
- Bev Sellars (born 1955), memoirist
- Zena Sharman (living), non-fiction writer
- Lorimer Shenher (living), non-fiction writer
- Sheung-King (living), novelist
- Murphy O. Shewchuk (living), non-fiction writer
- Tetsuro Shigematsu (born 1971), playwright
- Nell Shipman (1892–1970), screenwriter
- Kazuko Shiraishi (1931–2024), poet
- Bren Simmers (born 1976), poet
- Bertrand William Sinclair (1881–1972), novelist
- George Sipos (living), poet
- Constance Lindsay Skinner (1877–1939), non-fiction writer
- Giles Slade (living), non-fiction writer
- Mairlyn Smith (living), cookbook writer
- Michael V. Smith (living), novelist, poet
- R. D. Hilton Smith (1903–1974), non-fiction writer
- Ron Smith (born 1943), poet, playwright
- Tony Dean Smith (born 1977), screenwriter
- Madeline Sonik (born 1960), novelist, short story writer
- Esta Spalding (living), screenwriter, poet
- Heather Spears (1934–2021), poet, novelist
- Ashley Spires (living), children's writer
- Michelle Spring (born 1947), novelist
- L. S. Stavrianos (1913–2004), historian
- Peter Stebbings (living), screenwriter
- Arran Stephens (born 1944), non-fiction writer
- Doug Stephens (born 1964)
- Chevy Stevens (born 1973), novelist
- Richard Stevenson (1952–2023), poet
- Hilary Stewart (1924–2014)
- David Stouck (born 1940), biographer
- Pablo Strauss (born 1977), translator
- Reginald C. Stuart (1943–2018), historian
- Peter Stursberg (1913–2014), non-fiction writer, journalist
- Smokii Sumac (living), poet
- Diane Swanson (1944–2021), children's writer
- Jean Swanson (living), non-fiction writer

== T ==
- Proma Tagore (living), poet
- Terri Tatchell (living), screenwriter, children's writer
- Alastair M. Taylor (1915–2005), historian
- Yasuko Thanh (born 1971), novelist, short story writer
- Madeleine Thien (born 1974), short story writer, novelist
- Ian M. Thom (born 1952), non-fiction writer
- Audrey Thomas (born 1935), novelist, short story writer
- Colin Thomas (living), playwright
- Kyle Thomas (born 1983), screenwriter
- Jody Thompson (living), screenwriter
- Grace Eiko Thomson (1933–2024), memoirist
- Russell Thornton (living), poet
- Rhea Tregebov (born 1953), poet, novelist, children's writer
- Margaret Trudeau (born 1948), non-fiction writer
- Chris Tse (born 1989), poet
- Aaron Tucker (born 1982), novelist, poet
- Aren X. Tulchinsky (living), novelist, short story writer, screenwriter
- May Tully (1880s–1924), screenwriter
- Christopher Tunnard (1910–1979), non-fiction writer
- Philip Turner (1925–2006), novelist, children's writer
- Alan Twigg (born 1952), journalist, historian

== V ==
- John Vaillant (born 1962), non-fiction writer, journalist
- Vikram Vij (born 1964), cookbook writer
- Robert Vince (born 1962), screenwriter

== W ==
- Ian Waddell (1942–2021), novelist, memoirist
- Mark Waddell (living), mystery, comedy and horror novelist
- Harsha Walia (living), non-fiction writer
- CJ Wallis (living), screenwriter
- Jack Wang (living), short story writer
- Wayne Wapeemukwa (living), screenwriter
- Nancy Warren (living), novelist
- David Watmough (1926–2017), playwright, short story writer, novelist
- Sheila Watson (1909–1998), novelist
- Alison Watt (born 1957), poet, memoirist
- Phyllis Webb (1927–2021), poet
- Phyllis Webstad (born 1967), memoirist
- Gloria Cranmer Webster (1931–2023), non-fiction writer
- Martin West (born 1959), novelist
- Howard White (born 1945)
- Jack Whyte (1940–2021), novelist
- Diana Wichtel (born 1950)
- Gillian Wigmore (born 1976), poet
- Gina Wilkinson (1960–2010), playwright
- Richard Willett (living), novelist, playwright, screenwriter
- Aaron Williams (living), memoirist
- Deanne Williams (living), historian
- Terri-Lynn Williams-Davidson (born 1965)
- Michael D. Willis (living), historian
- Paul K. Willis (1947–1999), screenwriter
- Alan R. Wilson (living), novelist, poet
- D. W. Wilson (born 1985), novelist, short story writer
- Eric Wilson (born 1940), novelist
- John Wilson (born 1951), novelist, non-fiction writer
- Sandy Wilson (born 1947), screenwriter
- Cathleen With (living), novelist, short story writer
- Jack Wong (living), children's writer
- Lindsay Wong (living), memoirist
- Rita Wong (born 1968), poet
- Alan Woo (living), novelist, children's writer
- Dana Wyse (born 1965), non-fiction writer
- Robert Wiersema (born 1970), novelist and short story writer

== Y ==
- J. Michael Yates (1938–2019), poet
- Paul Yee (born 1956), historian
- Annie York (1904–1991), novelist
- Elwy Yost (1925–2011), novelist, film historian
- Patricia Young (born 1954), poet, short story writer
- Terence Young (born 1953), poet
- Marcus Youssef (living), playwright

== Z ==
- Xiran Jay Zhao (living), novelist
- Daniel Zomparelli (born 1985), poet
- Carolyn Zonailo (born 1947), poet

== See also ==
- Lists of Canadian writers
