= Ethel Wilson Fiction Prize =

Canadian literary award

The Ethel Wilson Fiction Prize, established in 1985 as one of the BC and Yukon Book Prizes, is awarded annually to the best work of fiction by a resident of British Columbia, Canada.

The award is named after novelist and short story writer Ethel Wilson, author of Swamp Angel (1954) and The Innocent Traveller (1949).

== Winners and finalists ==
Ethel Wilson Fiction Prize winners and finalists
Year	Author	Titles	Result	Ref.
1985	Audrey Thomas	Intertidal Life	Winner	
1985	Mary Ellen Collura	Winners	Shortlist	
1985	Charles Lillard	A Coastal Range	Shortlist	
1986	Keath Fraser	Foreign Affairs	Winner	
1986	Brian Fawcett	The Secret Journal of Alexander Mackenzie	Shortlist	
1986	George Ryga	In the Shadow of the Vulture	Shortlist	
1986	L. R. Wright	The Suspect	Shortlist	
1987	Leona Gom	Housebroken	Winner	
1987	Paulette Jiles	Sitting in the Club Car Drinking Rum and Karma Kola	Shortlist	
1987	Rona Murray	The Indigo Dress and Other Stories	Shortlist	
1988	George McWhirter	Cage	Winner	
1988	Jane Rule	Memory Board	Shortlist	
1988	Robin Skelton	The Parrot Who Could	Shortlist	
1989	Bill Schermbrucker	Mimosa	Winner	
1989	William Goede	Love In Beijing	Shortlist	
1989	Robert Harlow	Saxophone Winter	Shortlist	
1990	Keith Maillard	Motet	Winner	
1990	Jane Rule	After the Fire	Shortlist	
1991	Audrey Thomas	Wild Blue Yonder	Winner	
1991	Sky Lee	Disappearing Moon Cafe	Shortlist	
1991	Caroline Woodward	Disturbing the Peace	Shortlist	
1992	Don Dickinson	Blue Husbands	Winner	
1992	M.A.C. Farrant	Sick Pigeon	Shortlist	
1992	Maureen Moore	The Illuminations of Alice Mallory	Shortlist	
1993	W.D. Valgardson	The Girl with the Botticelli Face	Winner	
1993	Jane Eaton Hamilton	July Nights and Other Stories	Shortlist	
1993	Linda Svendsen	Marine Life	Shortlist	
1994	Caroline Adderson	Bad Imaginings	Winner	
1994	Keith Maillard	Light in the Company of Women	Shortlist	
1994	Carol Windley	Visible Light	Shortlist	
1995	Gayla Reid	To Be There with You	Winner	
1995	Grant Buday	Under Glass	Shortlist	
1995	Patricia Robertson	City of Orphans	Shortlist	
1996	Audrey Thomas	Coming Down from Wa	Winner	
1996	Joy Kogawa	Rain Ascends	Shortlist	
1996	Lorraine Vernon	Through the Canyon	Shortlist	
1997	Gail Anderson-Dargatz	The Cure for Death by Lightning	Winner	
1997	Nick Bantock	The Venetian's Wife	Shortlist	
1997	Shani Mootoo	Cereus Blooms at Night	Shortlist	
1998	Marilyn Bowering	Visible Worlds	Winner	
1998	Sally Ireland	Fox's Nose	Shortlist	
1998	Holley Rubinsky	At First I Hope for Rescue	Shortlist	
1999	Jack Hodgins	Broken Ground	Winner	
1999	Loranne Brown	The Handless Maiden	Shortlist	
1999	Anne Fleming	Pool-Hopping and Other Stories	Shortlist	
2000	Michael Turner	The Pornographer's Poem	Winner	
2000	Caroline Adderson	A History of Forgetting	Shortlist	
2000	Zsuzsi Gartner	All the Anxious Girls on Earth	Shortlist	
2000	Keith Harrison	Furry Creek	Shortlist	
2000	Alan R. Wilson	Before the Flood	Shortlist	
2001	Eden Robinson	Monkey Beach	Winner	
2001	Anita Rau Badami	The Hero's Walk	Shortlist	
2001	Barbara Lambert	A Message for Mr. Lazarus	Shortlist	
2001	Peter Trower	The Judas Hills	Shortlist	
2001	Jack Whyte	Uther	Shortlist	
2002	Madeleine Thien	Simple Recipes	Winner	
2002	Rebecca Godfrey	The Torn Skirt	Shortlist	
2002	Andrew Gray	Small Accidents	Shortlist	
2002	Gayla Reid	All the Seas of the World	Shortlist	
2002	Timothy Taylor	Stanley Park	Shortlist	
2003	Carol Shields	Unless	Winner	
2003	Kevin Armstrong	Nightwatch	Shortlist	
2003	Bill Gaston	Mount Appetite	Shortlist	
2003	Nancy Lee	Dead Girls	Shortlist	
2003	Gayla Reid	Closer Apart	Shortlist	
2004	Caroline Adderson	Sitting Practice	Winner	
2004	Claudia Casper	The Continuation of Love by Other Means	Shortlist	
2004	Steven Galloway	Ascension	Shortlist	
2004	Kevin Patterson	Country of Cold	Shortlist	
2004	Janet Warner	Other Sorrows, Other Joys	Shortlist	
2005	Pauline Holdstock	Beyond Measure	Winner	
2005	Bill Gaston	Sointula	Shortlist	
2005	Theresa Kishkan	A Man in a Distant Field	Shortlist	
2005	Annabel Lyon	The Best Thing for You	Shortlist	
2005	Patrick Taylor	The Apprenticeship of Dr. Laverty	Shortlist	
2006	Charlotte Gill	Ladykiller	Winner	
2006	Clint Burnham	Smoke Show	Shortlist	
2006	Lydia Kwa	The Walking Boy	Shortlist	
2006	John Lent	So It Won't Go Away	Shortlist	
2006	Audrey Thomas	Tattycoram	Shortlist	
2007	Carol Windley	Home Schooling	Winner	
2007	Marilyn Bowering	What It Takes to Be Human	Shortlist	
2007	Bill Gaston	Gargoyles	Shortlist	
2007	Anosh Irani	The Song of Kahunsha	Shortlist	
2007	Adam Lewis Schroeder	Empress of Asia	Shortlist	
2008	Mary Novik	Conceit	Winner	
2008	Heather Burt	Adam's Peak	Shortlist	
2008	David Chariandy	Soucouyant	Shortlist	
2008	Shaena Lambert	Radiance	Shortlist	
2008	Claire Mulligan	The Reckoning of Boston Jim	Shortlist	
2009	Lee Henderson	The Man Game	Winner	
2009	Steven Galloway	The Cellist of Sarajevo	Shortlist	
2009	Paul Headrick	That Tune Clutches My Heart	Shortlist	
2009	Patrick Lane	Red Dog, Red Dog	Shortlist	
2009	Andreas Schroeder	Renovating Heaven	Shortlist	
2010	Cathleen With	Having Faith in the Polar Girls' Prison	Winner	
2010	Annabel Lyon	The Golden Mean	Shortlist	
2010	Michael Turner	8 x 10	Shortlist	
2010	Ian Weir	Daniel O'Thunder	Shortlist	
2010	Deborah Willis	Vanishing and Other Stories	Shortlist	
2011	Gurjinder Basran	Everything Was Good-Bye	Winner	
2011	Rifet Bahtijaragic	Chernovs' Toil and Peace	Shortlist	
2011	Jack Hodgins	The Master of Happy Endings	Shortlist	
2011	Meredith Quartermain	Recipes from the Red Planet	Shortlist	
2011	Jack Whyte	The Forest Laird: A Tale of William Wallace	Shortlist	
2012	Esi Edugyan	Half-Blood Blues	Winner	
2012	Michael Christie	The Beggar's Garden	Shortlist	
2012	Frances Greenslade	Shelter	Shortlist	
2012	Steven Price	Into the Darkness	Shortlist	
2012	D. W. Wilson	Once You Break a Knuckle	Shortlist	
2013	Bill Gaston	The World	Winner	
2013	C. P. Boyko	Psychology and Other Stories	Shortlist	
2013	Anne Fleming	Gay Dwarves of America	Shortlist	
2013	Anakana Schofield	Malarky	Shortlist	
2013	Yasuko Thanh	Floating Like the Dead	Shortlist	
2014	Ashley Little	Anatomy of a Girl Gang	Winner	
2014	Théodora Armstrong	Clear Skies, No Wind, 100% Visibility	Shortlist	
2014	Janie Chang	Three Souls	Shortlist	
2014	Cynthia Flood	Red Girl Rat Boy	Shortlist	
2014	Kathryn Para	Lucky	Shortlist	
2015	Aislinn Hunter	The World Before Us	Winner	
2015	Caroline Adderson	Ellen in Pieces	Shortlist	
2015	Kathy Page	Paradise & Elsewhere	Shortlist	
2015	Brian Payton	The Wind is Not a River	Shortlist	
2015	Michael Springate	The Beautiful West & the Beloved of God	Shortlist	
2016	Alix Hawley	All True Not a Lie in It	Winner	
2016	Pauline Holdstock	The Hunter and the Wild Girl	Shortlist	
2016	Irina Kovalyova	Specimen	Shortlist	
2016	Nasreen Pejvack	Amity	Shortlist	
2016	Anakana Schofield	Martin John	Shortlist	
2017	Jennifer Manuel	The Heaviness of Things That Float	Winner	
2017	Joan Haggerty	The Dancehall Years	Shortlist	
2017	Anosh Irani	The Parcel	Shortlist	
2017	Jen Sookfong Lee	The Conjoined	Shortlist	
2017	Ashley Little	Niagara Motel	Shortlist	
2018	David Chariandy	Brother	Winner	
2018	Andrea MacPherson	What We Once Believed	Shortlist	
2018	Zoey Leigh Peterson	Next Year, For Sure	Shortlist	
2018	Eden Robinson	Son of a Trickster	Shortlist	
2018	Daniel Zomparelli	Everything Is Awful and You're a Terrible Person	Shortlist	
2019	Eden Robinson	Trickster Drift	Winner	
2019	Amber Dawn	Sodom Road Exit	Shortlist	
2019	Erin Frances Fisher	That Tiny Life	Shortlist	
2019	Alex Leslie	We All Need to Eat	Shortlist	
2019	Kathy Page	Dear Evelyn	Shortlist	
2020	Stephen Price	Lampedusa	Winner	
2020	Michael Christie	Greenwood	Shortlist	
2020	Nazanine Hozar	Aria	Shortlist	
2020	Alix Ohlin	Dual Citizens	Shortlist	
2020	Rhea Tregebov	Rue des Rosiers	Shortlist	
2021	Shaena Lambert	Petra	Winner	
2021	Susan Sanford Blades	Fake It So Real	Shortlist	
2021	Michelle Good	Five Little Indians	Shortlist	
2021	Aislinn Hunter	The Certainties	Shortlist	
2021	Annabel Lyon	Consent	Shortlist	
2022	Ruth Ozeki	The Book of Form and Emptiness	Winner	
2022	Cedar Bowers	Astra	Shortlist	
2022	Carrie Jenkins	Victoria Sees It	Shortlist	
2022	Rahela Nayebzadah	Monster Child	Shortlist	
2022	Alix Ohlin	We Want What We Want	Shortlist	
2023	Billy-Ray Belcourt	A Minor Chorus	Winner	
2023	Marion Ehrenberg	The Language of Dreams	Shortlist	
2023	Tsering Yangzom Lama	We Measure the Earth with Our Bodies	Shortlist	
2023	Janice Lynn Mather	Uncertain Kin	Shortlist	
2023	Danny Ramadan	The Foghorn Echoes	Shortlist	
2024	Darrel J. McLeod	A Season in Chezgh'un	Winner	
2024	Geoffrey D. Morrison	Falling Hour	Shortlist	
2024	Hazel Jane Plante	Any Other City	Shortlist	
2024	Brandon Reid	Beautiful Beautiful	Shortlist	
2024	Chelsea Wakelyn	What Remains of Elsie Jane	Shortlist	
2025	Shashi Bhat	Death by a Thousand Cuts	Winner	
2025	Billy-Ray Belcourt	Coexistence	Shortlist	
2025	Deirdre Simon Dore	A Reluctant Mother	Shortlist	
2025	Scott Alexander Howard	The Other Valley	Shortlist	
2025	Cynthia LeBrun	Black Sunflowers	Shortlist	
2026	Maria Reva	Endling	Winner	
2026	Sarah Louise Butler	Rufous and Calliope	Shortlist	
2026	Bill Gaston	Tunnel Island	Shortlist	
2026	Susan Juby	Contemplation of a Crime	Shortlist	
2026	Sam Wiebe	The Last Exile	Shortlist	
