= Governor General's Award for English-language fiction =

Canadian literary award

The Governor General's Award for English-language fiction is a Canadian literary award that annually recognizes one Canadian writer for a fiction book written in English. It is one of fourteen Governor General's Awards for Literary Merit, seven each for creators of English- and French-language books. The awards was created by the Canadian Authors Association in partnership with Lord Tweedsmuir in 1936. In 1959, the award became part of the Governor General's Awards program at the Canada Council for the Arts in 1959. The age requirement is 18 and up.

The program was created in 1937 by the Canadian Authors Association and inaugurated that November for 1936 publications in two English-language categories, conventionally called the 1936 Governor General's Awards. Administration of the awards was transferred to the Canada Council in 1959.

The winners alone were announced until 1979, when Canada Council released in advance a shortlist of three nominees. Omitted only for 1981, the advance shortlist has numbered three to six; from 1997, always five.

== Winners and nominees ==
=== 1930s ===
| Year | Author | Title | Ref |
|---|---|---|---|
| 1936 | Bertram Brooker | Think of the Earth | |
| 1937 | Laura G. Salverson | The Dark Weaver | |
| 1938 | Gwethalyn Graham | Swiss Sonata | |
| 1939 | Franklin D. McDowell | The Champlain Road | |

=== 1940s ===
| Year | Author | Title | Ref |
|---|---|---|---|
| 1940 | Ringuet | Thirty Acres | |
| 1941 | Alan Sullivan | Three Came to Ville Marie | |
| 1942 | G. Herbert Sallans | Little Man | |
| 1943 | Thomas H. Raddall | The Pied Piper of Dipper Creek | |
| 1944 | Gwethalyn Graham | Earth and High Heaven | |
| 1945 | Hugh MacLennan | Two Solitudes | |
| 1946 | Winifred Bambrick | Continental Revue | |
| 1947 | Gabrielle Roy | The Tin Flute | |
| 1948 | Hugh MacLennan | The Precipice | |
| 1949 | Philip Child | Mr. Ames Against Time | |

=== 1950s ===
| Year | Author | Title | Ref |
|---|---|---|---|
| 1950 | Germaine Guèvremont | The Outlander | |
| 1951 | Morley Callaghan | The Loved and the Lost | |
| 1952 | David Walker | The Pillar | |
| 1953 | David Walker | Digby | |
| 1954 | Igor Gouzenko | The Fall of a Titan | |
| 1955 | Lionel Shapiro | The Sixth of June | |
| 1956 | Adele Wiseman | The Sacrifice | |
| 1957 | Gabrielle Roy | Street of Riches | |
| 1958 | Colin McDougall | Execution | |
| 1959 | Hugh MacLennan | The Watch That Ends the Night | |

=== 1960s ===
| Year | Author | Title | Ref |
|---|---|---|---|
| 1960 | Brian Moore | The Luck of Ginger Coffey | |
| 1961 | Malcolm Lowry | Hear Us O Lord from Heaven Thy Dwelling Place | |
| 1962 | Kildare Dobbs | Running to Paradise | |
| 1963 | Hugh Garner | Hugh Garner's Best Stories | |
| 1964 | Douglas LePan | The Deserter | |
| 1965 | No award presented | | |
| 1966 | Margaret Laurence | A Jest of God | |
| 1967 | No award presented | | |
| 1968 | Alice Munro | Dance of the Happy Shades | |
| 1968 | Mordecai Richler | Cocksure | |
| 1969 | Robert Kroetsch | The Studhorse Man | |

=== 1970s ===
| Year | Author | Title | Ref. |
|---|---|---|---|
| 1970 | Dave Godfrey | The New Ancestors | |
| 1971 | Mordecai Richler | St. Urbain's Horseman | |
| 1972 | Robertson Davies | The Manticore | |
| 1973 | Rudy Wiebe | The Temptations of Big Bear | |
| 1974 | Margaret Laurence | The Diviners | |
| 1975 | Brian Moore | The Great Victorian Collection | |
| 1976 | Marian Engel | Bear | |
| 1977 | Timothy Findley | The Wars | |
| 1978 | Alice Munro | Who Do You Think You Are? | |
| 1979 | Jack Hodgins | The Resurrection of Joseph Bourne | |
| 1979 | Margaret Atwood | Life Before Man | |
| 1979 | Matt Cohen | The Sweet Second Summer of Kitty Malone | |

=== 1980s ===
| Year | Author | Title | Ref |
|---|---|---|---|
| 1980 | George Bowering | Burning Water | |
| 1980 | Susan Musgrave | The Charcoal Burners | |
| 1980 | Leon Rooke | Fat Woman | |
| 1981 | Mavis Gallant | Home Truths: Selected Canadian Stories | |
| 1982 | Guy Vanderhaeghe | Man Descending | |
| 1982 | Alice Munro | The Moons of Jupiter | |
| 1982 | Chris Scott | Antichthon | |
| 1983 | Leon Rooke | Shakespeare's Dog | |
| 1983 | Philip Kreiner | People Like Us in a Place Like This | |
| 1983 | H. R. Percy | Painted Ladies | |
| 1983 | Susan Swan | The Biggest Modern Woman of the World | |
| 1984 | Josef Skvorecky | The Engineer of Human Souls | |
| 1984 | Timothy Findley | Not Wanted on the Voyage | |
| 1984 | Susan Kerslake | The Book of Fears | |
| 1984 | Audrey Thomas | Intertidal Life | |
| 1985 | Margaret Atwood | The Handmaid's Tale | |
| 1985 | Sharon Butala | Queen of the Headaches | |
| 1985 | Keath Fraser | Foreign Affairs | |
| 1985 | David Adams Richards | Road to the Stilt House | |
| 1986 | Alice Munro | The Progress of Love | |
| 1986 | Lois Braun | A Stone Watermelon | |
| 1986 | John Metcalf | Adult Entertainment | |
| 1986 | Aritha van Herk | No Fixed Address | |
| 1987 | M. T. Kelly | A Dream Like Mine | |
| 1987 | David Gurr | The Ring Master | |
| 1987 | Rohinton Mistry | Tales from Firozsha Baag | |
| 1987 | Michael Ondaatje | In the Skin of a Lion | |
| 1987 | Carol Shields | Swann: A Mystery | |
| 1988 | David Adams Richards | Nights Below Station Street | |
| 1988 | Margaret Atwood | Cat's Eye | |
| 1988 | Joan Clark | The Victory of Geraldine Gull | |
| 1988 | Mark Frutkin | Atmospheres Apollinaire | |
| 1988 | Kenneth Radu | The Cost of Living | |
| 1989 | Paul Quarrington | Whale Music | |
| 1989 | Ann Copeland | The Golden Thread | |
| 1989 | Helen Weinzweig | A View from the Roof | |

=== 1990s ===
| Year | Author | Title | Ref. |
|---|---|---|---|
| 1990 | Nino Ricci | Lives of the Saints | |
| 1990 | Sky Lee | Disappearing Moon Café | |
| 1990 | Alice Munro | Friend of My Youth | |
| 1990 | Leslie Hall Pinder | On Double Tracks | |
| 1990 | Diane Schoemperlen | Man of My Dreams | |
| 1991 | Rohinton Mistry | Such a Long Journey | |
| 1991 | Margaret Atwood | Wilderness Tips | |
| 1991 | Don Dickinson | Blue Husbands | |
| 1991 | Douglas Glover | A Guide to Animal Behaviour | |
| 1991 | Terry Griggs | Quickening | |
| 1992 | Michael Ondaatje | The English Patient | |
| 1992 | Sandra Birdsell | The Chrome Suite | |
| 1992 | Archie Crail | The Bonus Deal | |
| 1992 | John Steffler | The Afterlife of George Cartwright | |
| 1992 | Sheila Watson | Deep Hollow Creek | |
| 1993 | Carol Shields | The Stone Diaries | |
| 1993 | Caroline Adderson | Bad Imaginings | |
| 1993 | Thomas King | Green Grass, Running Water | |
| 1993 | David Adams Richards | For Those Who Hunt the Wounded Down | |
| 1993 | Carol Windley | Visible Light | |
| 1994 | Rudy Wiebe | A Discovery of Strangers | |
| 1994 | Margaret Atwood | The Robber Bride | |
| 1994 | Donna McFarlane | Division of Surgery | |
| 1994 | Alice Munro | Open Secrets | |
| 1994 | Russell Smith | How Insensitive | |
| 1995 | Greg Hollingshead | The Roaring Girl | |
| 1995 | Diana Atkinson | Highways and Dancehalls | |
| 1995 | Barbara Gowdy | Mister Sandman | |
| 1995 | Julie Keith | The Jaguar Temple | |
| 1995 | Richard B. Wright | The Age of Longing | |
| 1996 | Guy Vanderhaeghe | The Englishman's Boy | |
| 1996 | Margaret Atwood | Alias Grace | |
| 1996 | Elisabeth Harvor | Let Me Be the One | |
| 1996 | Janice Kulyk Keefer | The Green Library | |
| 1996 | Cordelia Strube | Teaching Pigs to Sing | |
| 1996 | Audrey Thomas | Coming Down from Wa | |
| 1997 | Jane Urquhart | The Underpainter | |
| 1997 | Sandra Birdsell | The Two-Headed Calf | |
| 1997 | Matt Cohen | Last Seen | |
| 1997 | Elizabeth Hay | Small Change | |
| 1997 | Eric McCormack | First Blast of the Trumpet Against the Monstrous Regiment of Women | |
| 1998 | Diane Schoemperlen | Forms of Devotion | |
| 1998 | Lynn Coady | Strange Heaven | |
| 1998 | Barbara Gowdy | The White Bone | |
| 1998 | Wayne Johnston | The Colony of Unrequited Dreams | |
| 1998 | Kerri Sakamoto | The Electrical Field | |
| 1999 | Matt Cohen | Elizabeth and After | |
| 1999 | Neil Bissoondath | The Worlds Within Her | |
| 1999 | Anne Fleming | Pool-hopping and Other Stories | |
| 1999 | Elyse Gasco | Can You Wave Bye Bye, Baby? | |
| 1999 | Keith Maillard | Gloria | |

=== 2000s ===
| Year | Author | Title | Ref. |
|---|---|---|---|
| 2000 | Michael Ondaatje | Anil's Ghost | |
| 2000 | Margaret Atwood | The Blind Assassin | |
| 2000 | Austin Clarke | The Question | |
| 2000 | David Adams Richards | Mercy Among the Children | |
| 2000 | Eden Robinson | Monkey Beach | |
| 2001 | Richard B. Wright | Clara Callan | |
| 2001 | Yann Martel | Life of Pi | |
| 2001 | Tessa McWatt | Dragons Cry | |
| 2001 | Jane Urquhart | The Stone Carvers | |
| 2001 | Thomas Wharton | Salamander | |
| 2002 | Gloria Sawai | A Song for Nettie Johnson | |
| 2002 | David Bergen | The Case of Lena S. | |
| 2002 | Ann Ireland | Exile | |
| 2002 | Wayne Johnston | The Navigator of New York | |
| 2002 | Carol Shields | Unless | |
| 2003 | Douglas Glover | Elle | |
| 2003 | Margaret Atwood | Oryx and Crake | |
| 2003 | Elizabeth Hay | Garbo Laughs | |
| 2003 | Jean McNeil | Private View | |
| 2003 | Edeet Ravel | Ten Thousand Lovers | |
| 2004 | Miriam Toews | A Complicated Kindness | |
| 2004 | David Bezmozgis | Natasha and Other Stories | |
| 2004 | Trevor Cole | Norman Bray, In the Performance of His Life | |
| 2004 | Colin McAdam | Some Great Thing | |
| 2004 | Alice Munro | Runaway | |
| 2005 | David Gilmour | A Perfect Night to Go to China | |
| 2005 | Joseph Boyden | Three Day Road | |
| 2005 | Golda Fried | Nellcott Is My Darling | |
| 2005 | Charlotte Gill | Ladykiller | |
| 2005 | Kathy Page | Alphabet | |
| 2006 | Peter Behrens | The Law of Dreams | |
| 2006 | Trevor Cole | The Fearsome Particles | |
| 2006 | Bill Gaston | Gargoyles | |
| 2006 | Paul Glennon | The Dodecahedron, or A Frame for Frames | |
| 2006 | Rawi Hage | De Niro's Game | |
| 2007 | Michael Ondaatje | Divisadero | |
| 2007 | David Chariandy | Soucouyant | |
| 2007 | Barbara Gowdy | Helpless | |
| 2007 | Heather O'Neill | Lullabies for Little Criminals | |
| 2007 | M. G. Vassanji | The Assassin's Song | |
| 2008 | Nino Ricci | The Origin of Species | |
| 2008 | Rivka Galchen | Atmospheric Disturbances | |
| 2008 | Rawi Hage | Cockroach | |
| 2008 | David Adams Richards | The Lost Highway | |
| 2008 | Fred Stenson | The Great Karoo | |
| 2009 | Kate Pullinger | The Mistress of Nothing | |
| 2009 | Michael Crummey | Galore | |
| 2009 | Annabel Lyon | The Golden Mean | |
| 2009 | Alice Munro | Too Much Happiness | |
| 2009 | Deborah Willis | Vanishing and Other Stories | |

=== 2010s ===
| Year | Author | Title | Ref. |
|---|---|---|---|
| 2010 | Dianne Warren | Cool Water | |
| 2010 | Sandra Birdsell | Waiting for Joe | |
| 2010 | Emma Donoghue | Room | |
| 2010 | Drew Hayden Taylor | Motorcycles & Sweetgrass | |
| 2010 | Kathleen Winter | Annabel | |
| 2011 | Patrick deWitt | The Sisters Brothers | |
| 2011 | David Bezmozgis | The Free World | |
| 2011 | Esi Edugyan | Half-Blood Blues | |
| 2011 | Marina Endicott | The Little Shadow | |
| 2011 | Alexi Zentner | Touch | |
| 2012 | Linda Spalding | The Purchase | |
| 2012 | Tamas Dobozy | Siege 13 | |
| 2012 | Robert Hough | Dr. Brinkley's Tower | |
| 2012 | Vincent Lam | The Headmaster's Wager | |
| 2012 | Carrie Snyder | The Juliet Stories | |
| 2013 | Eleanor Catton | The Luminaries | |
| 2013 | Kenneth Bonert | The Lion Seeker | |
| 2013 | Joseph Boyden | The Orenda | |
| 2013 | Colin McAdam | A Beautiful Truth | |
| 2013 | Shyam Selvadurai | The Hungry Ghosts | |
| 2014 | Thomas King | The Back of the Turtle | |
| 2014 | Michael Crummey | Sweetland | |
| 2014 | Bill Gaston | Juliet Was a Surprise | |
| 2014 | Claire Holden Rothman | My October | |
| 2014 | Joan Thomas | The Opening Sky | |
| 2015 | Guy Vanderhaeghe | Daddy Lenin and Other Stories | |
| 2015 | Kate Cayley | How You Were Born | |
| 2015 | Rachel Cusk | Outline | |
| 2015 | Helen Humphreys | The Evening Chorus | |
| 2015 | Clifford Jackman | The Winter Family | |
| 2016 | Madeleine Thien | Do Not Say We Have Nothing | |
| 2016 | Gary Barwin | Yiddish for Pirates | |
| 2016 | Anosh Irani | The Parcel | |
| 2016 | Kerry Lee Powell | Willem de Kooning's Paintbrush | |
| 2016 | Katherena Vermette | The Break | |
| 2017 | Joel Thomas Hynes | We'll All Be Burnt in Our Beds Some Night | |
| 2017 | Michael Kaan | The Water Beetles | |
| 2017 | Alison MacLeod | All the Beloved Ghosts | |
| 2017 | Jocelyn Parr | Uncertain Weights and Measures | |
| 2017 | Kathleen Winter | Lost in September | |
| 2018 | Sarah Henstra | The Red Word | |
| 2018 | Paige Cooper | Zolitude | |
| 2018 | Rawi Hage | Beirut Hellfire Society | |
| 2018 | Miriam Toews | Women Talking | |
| 2018 | Joshua Whitehead | Jonny Appleseed | |
| 2019 | Joan Thomas | Five Wives | |
| 2019 | Michael Crummey | The Innocents | |
| 2019 | Cary Fagan | The Student | |
| 2019 | Marianne Micros | Eye | |
| 2019 | K. D. Miller | Late Breaking | |

=== 2020s ===
| Year | Author | Title | Ref |
|---|---|---|---|
| 2020 | Michelle Good | Five Little Indians | |
| 2020 | Francesca Ekwuyasi | Butter Honey Pig Bread | |
| 2020 | Thomas King | Indians on Vacation | |
| 2020 | Lisa Robertson | The Baudelaire Fractal | |
| 2020 | Leanne Betasamosake Simpson | Noopiming: The Cure for White Ladies | |
| 2021 | Norma Dunning | Tainna | |
| 2021 | Rachel Cusk | Second Place | |
| 2021 | G. A. Grisenthwaite | Home Waltz | |
| 2021 | Joe Ollmann | Fictional Father | |
| 2021 | Sheung-King | You Are Eating an Orange. You Are Naked. | |
| 2022 | Sheila Heti | Pure Colour | |
| 2022 | Shashi Bhat | The Most Precious Substance on Earth | |
| 2022 | Lisa Bird-Wilson | Probably Ruby | |
| 2022 | Brian Thomas Isaac | All the Quiet Places | |
| 2022 | Sheila Murray | Finding Edward | |
| 2023 | Anuja Varghese | Chrysalis | |
| 2023 | Suzette Mayr | The Sleeping Car Porter | |
| 2023 | Janika Oza | A History of Burning | |
| 2023 | Iain Reid | We Spread | |
| 2023 | Kai Thomas | In the Upper Country | |
| 2024 | Jordan Abel | Empty Spaces | |
| 2024 | Paola Ferrante | Her Body Among Animals | |
| 2024 | Oonya Kempadoo | Naniki | |
| 2024 | Canisia Lubrin | Code Noir | |
| 2024 | Kent Monkman, Gisèle Gordon | The Memoirs of Miss Chief Eagle Testickle: Vol. 1: A True and Exact Accounting of the History of Turtle Island | |
| 2025 | Kyle Edwards | Small Ceremonies | |
| 2025 | Benjamin Hertwig | Juiceboxers | |
| 2025 | Fawn Parker | Hi, It's Me | |
| 2025 | Maria Reva | Endling | |
| 2025 | Katherena Vermette | real ones | |
| 2026 | Kate Cayley | Property | |
| 2026 | Sharon Bala | Good Guys | |
| 2026 | Nina Dunic | Suddenly Light | |
| 2026 | Kim Fu | The Valley of Vengeful Ghosts | |
| 2026 | Sara Peters | Mother of God | |

== Multiple Winners ==
3 Awards

- Hugh MacLennan (1945, 1948, 1959)
- Alice Munro (1968 (tied), 1978, 1986)
- Guy Vanderhaeghe (1982, 1996, 2015) no other nominations
- Michael Ondaatje (1992, 2000, 2007)

2 Awards

- Gwethalyn Graham (1938, 1944)
- Gabrielle Roy (1947, 1957)
- David Walker (1952, 1953) only back-to-back winner
- Brian Moore (1960, 1975)
- Margaret Laurence (1966, 1974)
- Mordecai Richler (1968 (tied), 1971)
- Rudy Wiebe (1973, 1994) no other nominations
- Nino Ricci (1990, 2008) no other nominations

Prior to 1979, only the winners were announced.

Some winners of this prize have also won Governor General's Literary Awards in other categories, such as Margaret Atwood (Fiction, Poetry).
