= Writers' Trust Engel/Findley Award =

Engel/Findley Award
- Awarded for: body of work by a Canadian writer
- Country: Canada
- Presented by: Writers' Trust of Canada
- First award: 2008

The Writers' Trust Engel/Findley Award is a Canadian literary award, presented by the Writers' Trust of Canada to an established Canadian author to honour their body of work.

Presented for the first time in 2008 under the name Notable Author Award, the award was created by merging the formerly separate Marian Engel Award and Timothy Findley Award, which were presented to female and male nominees respectively. The award was subsequently renamed back to Engel/Findley.

The award is presented to one author, regardless of gender, annually. The award comes with a monetary prize of $25,000.

== Winners ==
=== Marian Engel Award (1986–2007) ===
- 1986 – Alice Munro
- 1987 – Audrey Thomas
- 1988 – Edna Alford
- 1989 – Merna Summers
- 1990 – Carol Shields
- 1991 – Joan Clark
- 1992 – Joan Barfoot
- 1993 – Sandra Birdsell
- 1994 – Jane Urquhart
- 1995 – Bonnie Burnard
- 1996 – Barbara Gowdy
- 1997 – Katherine Govier
- 1998 – Sharon Butala
- 1999 – Janice Kulyk Keefer
- 2000 – Anita Rau Badami
- 2001 – Elizabeth Hay
- 2002 – Terry Griggs
- 2003 – Elisabeth Harvor
- 2004 – Dianne Warren
- 2005 – Gayla Reid
- 2006 – Caroline Adderson
- 2007 – Diane Schoemperlen

=== Timothy Findley Award (2002–2007) ===
- 2002 – Bill Gaston
- 2003 – Guy Vanderhaeghe
- 2004 – David Adams Richards
- 2005 – Rohinton Mistry
- 2006 – Douglas Glover
- 2007 – Michael Crummey

=== Engel/Findley Award (2008–present) ===
- 2008 – Michael Winter
- 2009 – David Bergen
- 2010 – Miriam Toews
- 2011 – Wayne Johnston
- 2012 – Nino Ricci
- 2013 – Lisa Moore
- 2014 – Joan Thomas
- 2015 – Annabel Lyon
- 2016 – Eden Robinson
- 2017 – Billie Livingston
- 2018 – Alissa York
- 2019 – Rawi Hage
- 2020 – Kerri Sakamoto
- 2021 – Cherie Dimaline
- 2022 – Shani Mootoo
- 2023 – Anosh Irani
- 2024 – Madeleine Thien
- 2025 – Kim Thúy
- 2026 - Shaena Lambert
