= Holdstock =

Holdstock is a surname. Notable people with the surname include:

- Adrian Holdstock (born 1970), South African cricketer and umpire
- Pauline Holdstock (born 1948), British-Canadian writer
- Robert Holdstock (1948–2009), English writer
- Roy Holdstock (born 1955), English rugby league player
