= Room (magazine) =

Canadian quarterly literary magazine

- Issue 38.2 "How We Relate" (Summer 2015). Cover art: "Climbing Into My Imagination" by Emily Cooper (2009)
- Editor: Shristi Uprety
- Categories: Literary magazine
- Frequency: Quarterly
- Circulation: 1,700
- Publisher: Molly Cross-Blanchard
- Founded: 1975
- Country: Canada
- Based in: Vancouver
- Language: English
- Website: www.roommagazine.com
- ISSN: 0316-1609

Room (formerly Room of One's Own) is a Canadian quarterly literary journal that features the work of emerging and established women and genderqueer writers and artists. Launched in Vancouver in 1975 by the West Coast Feminist Literary Magazine Society, or the Growing Room Collective, the journal has published an estimated 3,000 women, serving as an important launching pad for emerging writers. Room publishes short fiction, creative non-fiction, poetry, art, feature interviews, and features that promote dialogue between readers, writers and the collective, including "Roommate" (a profile of a Room reader or collective member) and "The Back Room" (back page interviews on feminist topics of interest). Collective members are regular participants in literary and arts festivals in Greater Vancouver and Toronto.

== History ==
The journal's original title (1975-2006) Room of One's Own came from Virginia Woolf's essay A Room of One's Own. In 2007, the collective relaunched the magazine as Room, reflecting a more outward-facing, conversational editorial mandate; however, the original name and its inspiration is reflected in a quote from the Woolf essay that always appears on the back cover of the magazine.

Room magazine has always been operated by an editorial collective. Former collective members include author Gayla Reid, CBC broadcaster Eleanor Wachtel, University of British Columbia Press editor Jean Wilson, and Geist senior editor Mary Schendlinger.

Works that originally appeared in Room have been anthologized the Journey Prize Anthology, Best Canadian Poetry, Best Canadian Essays, and Best Canadian Stories, and have been nominated for National Magazine Awards.

Approximately 90% of the content Room publishes comes from unsolicited submissions.

== Notable contributors ==
Past contributors to Room include Marian Engel, Carol Shields, Eden Robinson, Nalo Hopkinson, Larissa Lai, Lorna Crozier, Evelyn Lau, Ivan Coyote, Audrey Thomas, Kate Braid, Souvankham Thammavongsa, Susan Point, Hiromi Goto, Susan Musgrave, Shani Mootoo, Elizabeth Hay, Karen Solie, Erín Moure, Yasuko Thanh, Cynthia Flood, Gail Anderson-Dargatz, M. NourbeSe Philip, Daphne Marlatt, Bronwen Wallace, Carmen Aguirre, Ayelet Tsabari, Nancy Richler, Eliza Robertson, Carmen Rodríguez, Marie Annharte Baker, Betsy Warland, Lydia Kwa, and Elizabeth Bachinsky, among many other acclaimed writers and artists. Recent issues have included interviews with Ursula K. Le Guin, Miriam Toews, Joy Kogawa, Lisa Charleyboy, Stacey McKenzie, d'bi young, Jillian Tamaki, Janie Chang, and Mariko Tamaki.

== Writing contests ==
Room currently offers four writing contests, which are open to both Canadian and international writers who identify as women or genderqueer. The deadline for the fiction and poetry contests is in mid-July, while the deadline for the creative non-fiction contest is currently on 8 March, which is also International Women's Day. The creative non-fiction contest was originally added to the other two genres in 2008, and moved to the March deadline starting in 2015.

In 2016, Room launched their first Short Forms Contest, a multi-genre / genre-blending contest for flash fiction, flash CNF, and prose poetry of 500 words and under, with an inaugural deadline of 15 January 2017.

In addition to offering contests, Room presents one contributor each year with a $500 Emerging Writer Award.

== Cover art contest ==
In 2015, Room introduced a cover art contest with a deadline of 30 November.

== Making Room: Forty Years of Room Magazine ==
In 2017, Room published the anthology, Making Room: Forty Years of Room Magazine. The anthology contains a selection of works featured in Room between 1975 and 2016. The anthology is broken up chronologically and follows Canadian feminist writing throughout different eras of feminism. 80 pieces are featured in Making Room. The Making Room project was coordinated by Meghan Bell.

=== Anthology contributors ===
- Carmen Aguirre
- Najwa Ali
- Gail Anderson-Dargatz
- Elizabeth Bachinsky
- Marie Annharte Baker
- Monique Bosco
- Kate Braid
- Nicole Brossard
- Cyndia Cole
- Ivan Coyote
- Lucas Crawford
- Su Croll
- Lynn Crosbie
- Lorna Crozier
- Danielle Daniel
- Amber Dawn
- Junie Désil
- Sandy Frances Duncan
- Dorothy Elias
- Christine Estima
- Tanya Evanson
- barbara findlay
- Cynthia Flood
- Chantal Gibson
- Leona Gom
- Jane Eaton Hamilton
- Wasela Hiyate
- Nancy Holmes
- Anna Humphrey
- Mindy Hung
- Carole Itter
- Amy Jones
- Helen Kuk
- Matea Kulić
- Naoko Kumagai
- Fiona Tinwei Lam
- Doretta Lau
- Evelyn Lau
- Jen Sookfong Lee
- Tracey Lindberg
- Dorothy Livesay
- Annabel Lyon
- Vera Manuel
- Daphne Marlatt
- Robin Blackburn McBride
- Carmelita McGrath
- Cara-Lyn Morgan
- Erín Moure
- Susan Musgrave
- Alessandra Naccarato
- Kellee Ngan
- Otoniya J. Okot Bitek
- Monica Pacheco
- M. NourbeSe Philip
- Helen Potrebenko
- Sina Queyras
- Eden Robinson
- Constance Rooke
- Rebecca Rosenblum
- Devyani Saltzman
- Sigal Samuel
- Nilofar Shidmehr
- Carol Shields
- Serena Shipp
- Carolyn Smart
- Susan Stenson
- Anna Swanson
- Souvankham Thammavongsa
- Audrey Thomas
- Ayelet Tsabari
- Chimwemwe Undi
- Eleanor Wachtel
- Betsy Warland
- jia qing wilson-yang

== Growing Room Festival ==
Room launched Growing Room: A Feminist Literary Festival in 2017. The first festival was planned to celebrate both Room's 40th anniversary and International Women's Day and ran from 8 to 12 March in Vancouver, British Columbia. Growing Room features panels and from female and genderqueer Canadian writers as well as dancing and music.

The 2018 iteration of Growing Room was held from 1 to 4 March of that year. The 2019 festival was held from 8 to 17 March and featured approximately 100 writers and over 50 events. Growing Room 2020 was cancelled due to COVID-19.

== See also ==
- List of literary magazines
- List of literary awards honoring women
