= Franklin D. McDowell =

Canadian writer

- Born: 1888; Bowmanville, Ontario, Canada
- Died: 19 July 1965 (aged 76–77); Orangeville, Ontario, Canada
- Occupations: Journalist, novelist, public relations
- Spouse: Kathleen McDowell
- Writing career
- Notable work: The Champlain Road

Franklin Davey McDowell (1888 – 19 July 1965) was a Canadian writer, whose novel The Champlain Road won the Governor General's Award for English-language fiction in 1939.

Beginning his career in 1909 as a journalist with The Toronto World, the Toronto Mail and Empire and the Winnipeg Free Press, McDowell also published a number of short stories. He edited The Sailor, the magazine of the Navy League of Canada, before joining Canadian National Railways in 1923. He worked there in public relations until retirement in 1953; while in that job he travelled on the first Canadian train where telephone calls were possible.

The Champlain Road was about the martyrdom of Jean de Brébeuf and has been described as "a grandiloquent historical romance set in the mid-17th century, about conversion and sacrifice among the Iroquois and Huron." His other novel, Forges of Freedom, was about Wat Tyler. In a review, William Arthur Deacon said it was "a full-bodied, powerful novel, an incalculable advance from The Champlain Road.... The inherent strength and vitality of Forges of Freedom, more than its tremendous physical and emotional range and its author's meticulous care for detail, places McDowell among the foremost Canadian writers." Its first edition included illustrations by Franklin Carmichael.

== Bibliography ==
- The Champlain Road (1939)
- Forges of Freedom (1943)
