= Anita Rau Badami =

Canadian writer

- Born: 24 September 1961 (age 65); Rourkela, Odisha, India
- Occupation: writer
- Writing career
- Language: English
- Website: www.anitaraubadami.ca

Anita Rau Badami on Bookbits radio.

Anita Rau Badami (born 24 September 1961) is a Canadian writer of Indian descent.

== Personal life and education ==
Badami was born 24 September 1961 in Rourkela, Odisha, India, to a South Indian Kannada-speaking family.

She attended Sophia College, where she studied Social Communications Media, and received a Bachelor of Arts in English from the University of Madras.She has also shown her work in writing many stories, one of them including "My Brother's Great Invention".

Badami married in 1984; her son was born in 1987.

In 1991, she immigrated to Canada, then attended the University of Calgary, where she received a Master of Arts in Creative Writing in 1995. In 1997, her thesis project was published under the title Tamarind Mem.

== Career ==
Badami began her career in India as a copywriter and freelance journalist.

After moving to Canada in 1991, she published her first novel, Tamarind Mem, in 1996.

In 2014-15 Badami was writer-in-residence at Athabasca University in Edmonton.

In 2017, Badami was chair of the Scotiabank Giller Prize jury.

== Influences ==
Badami cites as among her favourite books Midnight's Children by Salman Rushdie, Cat's Eye and Surfacing by Margaret Atwood, A House for Mr Biswas by V. S. Naipaul, and Housekeeping by Marilynne Robinson.

== Awards and honours ==
In 2000, Badami won the Marian Engel Award to honour her body of work.

In 2016, The Hero's Walk was listed as one of the five finalists for the CBC Canada Reads competition.

In 2019, CBC Books included Badami on their "100 writers in Canada the world should read" list.

Awards for Badami's writing
Year	Title	Award	Category	Result	Ref.
2000	The Hero's Walk	Kiriyama Prize	Fiction	Shortlist	
2001	The Hero's Walk	Commonwealth Book Prize	Best Book: Canada and the Caribbean	Winner	
2001	The Hero's Walk	Ethel Wilson Fiction Prize	—	Shortlist	
2002	The Hero's Walk	Orange Prize for Fiction	—	Longlist	
2008	Can You Hear the Nightbird Call?	International Dublin Literary Award	—	Longlist	
2012	Tell It to the Trees	International Dublin Literary Award	—	Longlist	
2013	Tell It to the Trees	Ontario Library Association Evergreen Award	—	Shortlist	

== Bibliography ==
- Tamarind Mem. Viking Penguin. 1997. ISBN 9780670874552.
- The Hero's Walk. Alfred A. Knopf Canada. 2001. ISBN 9780676972252.
- Can You Hear the Nightbird Call?. Knopf Canada. 2006. ISBN 9780676976045.
- Tell It to the Trees. Knopf Canada. 2011. ISBN 9780676978933.
