= Loranne Brown =

Canadian writer

Loranne Brown (born 1955) is a Canadian writer, most noted for her 1998 novel The Handless Maiden.

Originally from Thunder Bay, Ontario, she lived in Bermuda for a number of years after marrying her husband Lorne, before they returned to Canada in 1989. She is currently based in Langley, British Columbia, where she has been a creative writing instructor at Trinity Western University.

The Handless Maiden, her debut novel, was published in 1998 by Doubleday Canada, The novel centred on Mariah Standhoffer, a young woman whose burgeoning talent as a concert pianist is destroyed when she accidentally shoots off her hand while trying to kill her sexually abusive grandfather in self-defense, but who ultimately triumphs over adversity to become a successful composer. The novel received a number of literary award nominations, including for the Books in Canada First Novel Award, the Ethel Wilson Fiction Prize, and the initial longlist for the International Dublin Literary Award.

She has not published any further novels, although she has continued to publish short fiction and poetry in literary magazines.
