= Caroline Adderson =

Canadian novelist and short story writer

- Born: September 9, 1963 (age 63); Edmonton, Alberta
- Education: University of British Columbia
- Occupations: Novelist and short story writer
- Spouse: Bruce Sweeney
- Website: carolineadderson.com; carolineaddersonkids.com

Caroline Adderson (born September 9, 1963) is a Canadian novelist and short story writer. She has published four novels, two short story collections and two books for young readers.

== Biography ==
Adderson was born on September 9, 1963, in Edmonton, Alberta, to James Neil and Bernice Adderson.

She received a Bachelor of Education degree from the University of British Columbia in 1986. Following graduation, she attended a writing program at the Banff Centre for Arts and Creativity.

Aside from writing, she has taught at the Banff Centre for Arts and Creativity and Simon Fraser University.

Adderson presently lives in Vancouver with her husband, Bruce Sweeney.

== Awards and honours ==
In 2006, Adderson received the Marian Engel Award, "given annually to an outstanding Canadian female writer in mid-career in recognition of her body of work."

In 2010, Quill & Quire and The Globe and Mail named The Sky is Falling one of the best books of the year.

Awards for Adderson's writing
| Year | Title | Award | Result | Ref. |
|---|---|---|---|---|
| 1993 | Bad Imaginings | Governor General's Award for English-language fiction | Shortlist | |
| 1994 | Bad Imaginings | Ethel Wilson Fiction Prize | Winner | |
| 1999 | A History of Forgetting | Rogers Writers' Trust Fiction Prize | Shortlist | |
| 2000 | A History of Forgetting | Ethel Wilson Fiction Prize | Shortlist | |
| 2004 | Sitting Practice | Ethel Wilson Fiction Prize | Winner | |
| 2004 | Sitting Practice | VanCity Prize | Shortlist | |
| 2006 | Pleased to Meet You | Scotiabank Giller Prize | Longlist | |
| 2011 | The Sky is Falling | Commonwealth Writers Prize | Nominee | |
| 2012 | The Sky is Falling | International Dublin Literary Award | Longlist | |
| 2013 | | Sunday Times Short Story Award | Longlist | |
| 2013 | Middle of Nowhere | CLA Book of the Year for Children Award | Shortlist | |
| 2013 | Middle of Nowhere | Sheila A. Egoff Children's Literature Prize | Winner | |
| 2015 | Ellen in Pieces | Ethel Wilson Fiction Prize | Shortlist | |
| 2015 | Norman, Speak! | Christie Harris Illustrated Children's Literature Prize | Finalist | |
| 2016 | Vancouver Vanishes | Bill Duthie Booksellers' Choice Award | Finalist | |
| 2022 | Sunny Days Inside and Other Stories | Ruth & Sylvia Schwartz Children's Book Award for Young Adult/Middle Grade | Finalist | |
| 2024 | A Way to Be Happy | Giller Prize | Longlist | |

== Publications ==
=== As editor ===
- Vancouver Vanishes: Narratives of Demolition and Revival (2016)
- Best Canadian Stories 2019 (2019)

=== Short story collections ===
- Bad Imaginings (1993, ISBN 0-88984-172-1)
- Pleased to Meet You: Stories (2006, ISBN 0-88762-220-8)
- Sunny Days Inside (2021)
- A Way to Be Happy (2024)

=== Novels ===
- A History of Forgetting (1999)
- Sitting Practice (2003, ISBN 0-88762-129-5)
- The Sky Is Falling (2010, Thomas Allen Publishers)
- Ellen in Pieces (2014, ISBN 1-443-42678-4)
- A Russian Sister (2020)

=== Novella ===
- Mr. Justice (2005, ISBN 0-9735881-3-6)

=== Children's fiction ===
- Very Serious Children (2007)
- Middle of Nowhere (2012)
- Norman, Speak!, illustrated by Qin Leng (2014)
- A Simple Case of Angels (2014)
- Eat, Leo! Eat!, illustrated by Josée Bisaillon (2015)
- I Love You, One to Ten, illustrated by Christina Leist (2015)
- The Mostly True Story of Pudding Tat, Adventuring Cat, illustrated by Stacy Innerst (2019)
- It Happened on Sweet Street, illustrated by Stéphane Jorisch (2020)
- Babble!: And How Punctuation Saved It, illustrated by Roman Muradov (2022)

==== Bruno series ====
- I, Bruno, illustrated by Helen Flook (2007)
- Bruno for Real, illustrated by Helen Flook (2008)

==== Izzy series ====
The Izzy books are illustrated by Kelly Collier.

- Izzy in the Doghouse
- Izzy's Tail of Trouble (2022)
- Izzy's Dog Days of Summer (2023)

==== Jasper John Dooley series ====
1. Star of the Week, illustrated by Ben Clanton (2012)
2. Left Behind, illustrated by Ben Clanton (2013)
3. Not in Love, illustrated by Ben Clanton (2014)
4. You're in Trouble, illustrated by Ben Clanton (2015)
5. Lost and Found, illustrated by Mike Shiell (2015)
6. Public Library Enemy #1, illustrated by Mike Shiell (2016)

==== Pierre & Paul series ====
The Pierre & Paul books are illustrated by Alice Carter.

- Avalanche! (2020)
- Dragon! (2021)

== Sources ==
- W. H. New, ed. Encyclopedia of Literature in Canada. Toronto: University of Toronto Press, 2002: 9.
- Records of Caroline Adderson are held by Simon Fraser University's Special Collections and Rare Books
- Adderson at Writers' Union of Canada: CV, Publications, Awards
