= Jennifer Manuel =

Canadian novelist

- Born: January 3, 1971 (age 55); Toronto, Canada
- Education: Simon Fraser University (B.A.), University of British Columbia (BEd), University of Victoria (Graduate Certificate)
- Alma mater: Simon Fraser University; University of British Columbia; University of Victoria
- Occupations: Author, novelist
- Writing career
- Language: English
- Notable works: The Heaviness of Things That Float; Dressed to Play; Head to Head; Open Secrets
- Notable awards: Ethel Wilson Fiction Prize (2017)
- Website: www.jenmanuel.com

Jennifer Manuel is a Canadian novelist and short-story writer. She has published one literary novel and three books for young readers. Her debut novel The Heaviness of Things That Float won the Ethel Wilson Fiction Prize in 2017. She has published two middle-grade sports novels including Dressed to Play and Head to Head, which was nominated for The Red Cedar Awards in 2021. Her young adult novel, Open Secrets, addresses grooming in the music industry. She has also published short stories in The Fiddlehead, Prism International, and Room Magazine. Her short story, "Urchin," was a Western Magazine finalist.

Born in Toronto, Canada, she grew up in White Rock, British Columbia. She is the daughter of children's author Lynn Manuel. She currently resides on Vancouver Island, where she teaches English and is the Head of Indigenous Initiatives and Engagement at Shawnigan Lake School. She is the Founder of the TRC Reading Challenge, an initiative that encourages all Canadians to read the TRC Report.

== Bibliography ==
Year	Title	ISBN	Notes
2016	The Heaviness of Things That Float	ISBN 978-1771620871	Ethel Wilson Fiction Prize (Winner, 2017)
2020	Dressed to Play (Lorimer Sports Stories)	ISBN 978-1459414679	
2021	Open Secrets (Lorimer SideStreets)	ISBN 978-1459415881	
2021	Head to Head (Lorimer Sports Stories)	ISBN 978-1459414280	Red Cedar Award (nominated)
