= David Chariandy =

Canadian writer (born 1969)

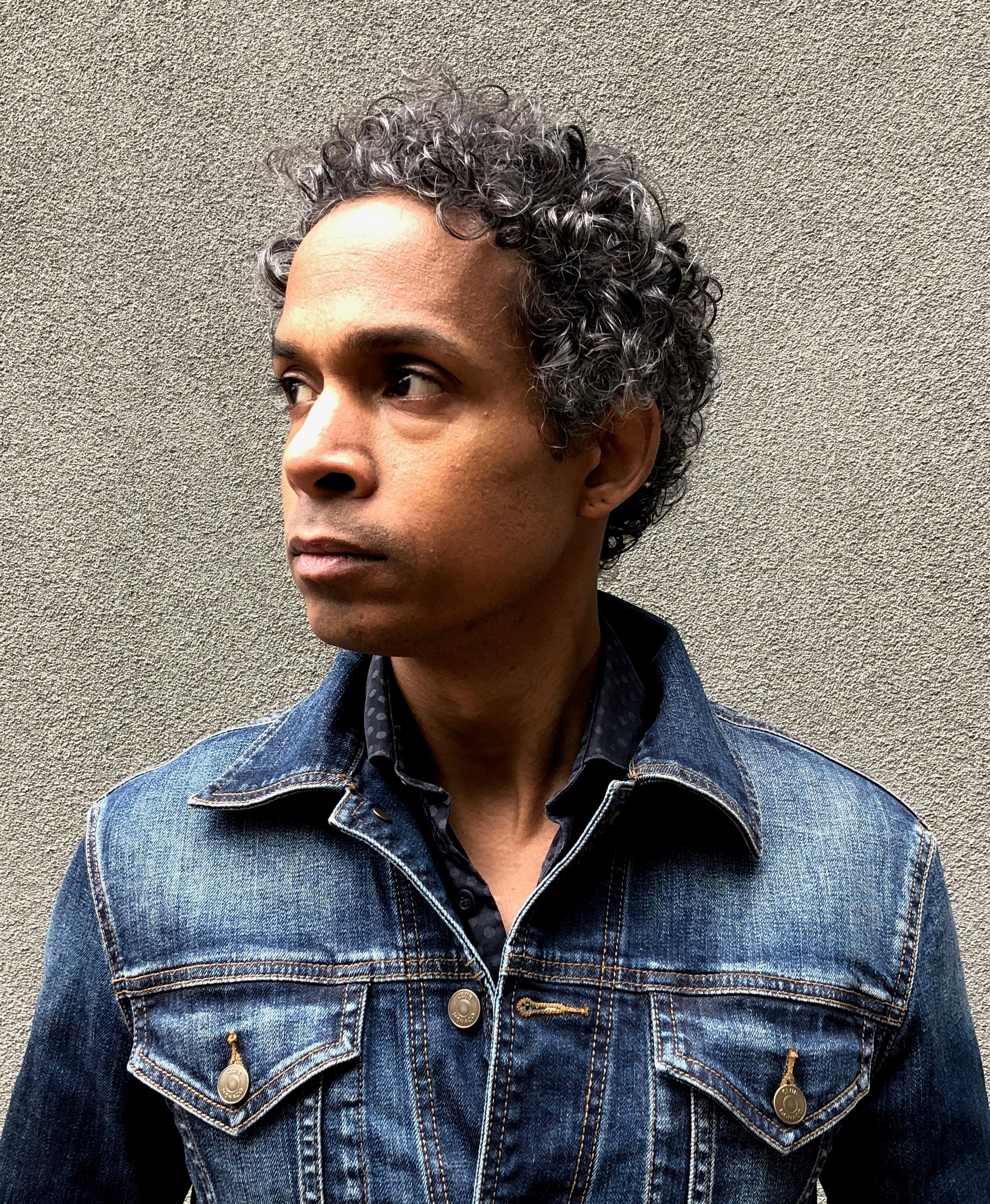
- Chariandy in 2019
- Born: David John Chariandy; 1969 (age 56–57); Scarborough, Ontario, Canada
- Education: Carleton University; York University
- Occupations: Novelist and academic
- Writing career
- Period: 2000s–present
- Notable works: Soucouyant (2007); Brother (2017)

David John Chariandy (born 1969) is a Canadian writer and academic, presently working as a professor of English literature at the University of Toronto. His 2017 novel Brother won the Rogers Writers' Trust Fiction Prize, Ethel Wilson Fiction Prize, and Toronto Book Award.

== Life and career ==
Chariandy's parents immigrated to Canada from Trinidad in the 1960s. He was born in 1969 in Scarborough, Ontario. His father is of Indo-Trinidadian descent (Tamil and South Indian), whereas his mother is Afro-Trinidadian. They were both working-class immigrants.

Chariandy has a Bachelor of Arts and Master of Arts from Carleton University and a PhD from York University. For many years he lived in Vancouver and taught in the Department of English at Simon Fraser University. In 2024, he joined the faculty of the University of Toronto as a Professor in the Department of English.

Chariandy's family includes his wife and two children: a son and a daughter.

== Writing and themes ==
Chariandy's novels are set in Scarborough, a district of Toronto, Ontario, known for its large immigrant populartion. In his work, he explores themes of immigration and children of immigrants belonging to multiple parts of the world.

Chariandy told the Toronto Star:

If I'm honest, I always wanted to write a story that evoked the complexities of growing up young and Black in Scarborough [...] Throughout my entire life growing up in Scarborough and returning to it even as a young adult, I always felt so discomforted by the negative stories of Scarborough that would circulate in the newspapers and tabloids and sometimes by word of mouth, among people who really didn't know Scarborough that well.

His novels offer stories of Scarborough that present "challenges, but tell that bigger story of life and vitality that you don’t always see in headlines."

His non-fiction book I've Been Meaning to Tell You: A Letter to My Daughter was inspired by both a racist incident he experienced while at a Vancouver restaurant with his three-year-old daughter and then, years later, by the Quebec City mosque shooting in 2017.

Chariandy's novel Brother, the 2017 winner of the Rogers Writers' Trust Fiction Prize, was optioned for film in 2018 The film went into production in fall 2021 under the direction of Clement Virgo. The film, Brother, premiered at the 2022 Toronto International Film Festival, and won 12 Canadian Screen Awards at the 11th Canadian Screen Awards in 2023.

Soucouyant has also gone into development as a feature film, slated to be directed by Ian Harnarine.

== Awards and honours ==
Year	Title	Award	Result	Ref.
2007	Soucouyant	Books in Canada First Novel Award	Shortlist	
2007	Soucouyant	Governor General's Award for English-language fiction	Shortlist	
2007	Soucouyant	Scotiabank Giller Prize	Longlist	
2008	Soucouyant	Ethel Wilson Fiction Prize	Shortlist	
2008	Soucouyant	Commonwealth Writers' Prize for Best First Book (Canada and the Caribbean)	Shortlist	
2008	Soucouyant	International Dublin Literary Award	Longlist	
2008	Soucouyant	ReLit Award for Fiction	Shortlist	
2008	Soucouyant	Toronto Book Award	Shortlist	
2017	Brother	Rogers Writers' Trust Fiction Prize	Winner	
2017	Brother	Scotiabank Giller Prize	Longlist	
2018	Brother	Ethel Wilson Fiction Prize	Winner	
2018	Brother	Not the Booker Prize	Longlist	
2018	Brother	Toronto Book Award	Winner	
2019	Brother	Aspen Words Literary Prize	Shortlist	
2019	Brother	Canada Reads	Longlist	
2019	Brother	Hurston/Wright Legacy Award for Fiction	Nominee	
2019	Brother	Windham–Campbell Literature Prize for Fiction	Winner	
2019	Brother	Orwell Prize for Political Fiction	Longlist	
2019	Brother	PEN Open Book Award	Longlist	

== Publications ==
- Soucouyant: A Novel of Forgetting (2007)
- Brother (2017)
- I've Been Meaning to Tell You: A Letter to My Daughter (2018)

== Selected talks ==
- "Made in Canada", with Jordan Abel and Stephanie Sinclair, Chan Centre for the Performing Arts, 10 March 2026
