= Gayla Reid =

Australian-born Canadian writer (born 1945)

Gayla Reid (born 12 May 1945) is an Australian-born Canadian writer.

== Biography ==
Born and raised in Armidale, New South Wales, Reid was educated at the University of New England, Australian National University and the University of British Columbia. Remaining in Canada, she was active in the country's feminist movement, editing the newspaper Kinesis and the literary journal Room of One's Own and teaching women's studies at Vancouver Community College.

She began publishing fiction in the early 1990s, winning the Journey Prize in 1993 for her short story "Sister Doyle's Men". In 1994, she published her first short story collection, To Be There With You, which was a winner of the Ethel Wilson Fiction Prize in 1995. All the Seas of the World and Closer Apart were finalists for the Ethel Wilson fiction prize in 2001 and 2002. Come from Afar was published to critical acclaim in 2011. According to jury citation, Gayla Reid stands out for her stunningly beautiful language and her ability to depict places such as Canada, Australia, Vietnam etc. She also described a state of mind, an evocation of a particular character's relationship to land, people and time. Her fiction combines the poetry of language and observation with the force of highly accomplished and compelling narrative.

Reid is represented by the Carolyn Swayze Literary Agency.

== Awards ==
- 1993, Journey Prize
- 1995, Ethel Wilson Fiction Prize
- 2005, Marian Engel Award

== Selected bibliography ==
- To Be There With You. Vancouver: Douglas and McIntyre, 1994.
- All the Seas of the World. Toronto: Stoddart, 2001. ISBN 978-0-7737-3280-3
- Closer Apart. Toronto: Stoddart, 2002. ISBN 978-0-7737-3337-4
- Come from Afar. Toronto: Comorant, 2011. ISBN 978-1-77086-044-5
