= Susan Sanford Blades =

Canadian writer

- Occupations: Novelist and short story writer
- Writing career
- Notable work: Fake It So Real

Susan Sanford Blades is a Canadian novelist and short story writer. She is most noted for her debut novel Fake It So Real, which won the 2021 ReLit Award for Fiction and was shortlisted for the 2021 Ethel Wilson Fiction Prize.

A resident of Victoria, British Columbia, she has also published short stories in literary magazines. Her story "The Rest of Him" was a longlisted nominee for the Journey Prize in 2020.
