= Gurjinder Basran =

Canadian novelist

- Born: 1972 (age 53–54)
- Occupation: novelist
- Writing career
- Period: 2010s-present
- Notable work: Everything Was Good-bye

Gurjinder Basran (born 1972) is a Canadian novelist, whose debut novel Everything Was Good-bye won the Ethel Wilson Fiction Prize in 2011. The novel was published by Mother Tongue Publishing in 2010, and was more widely republished by Penguin Canada in 2011 following her award win.

Basran is a graduate of the creative writing program at Simon Fraser University. In 2016, she served on the jury for the amazon.ca First Novel Award.

Her second novel, Someone You Love Is Gone, was published in 2017.

== Bibliography ==
- Everything Was Goodbye (2010)
- Someone You Love Is Gone (2017)
- Help! I'm Alive (2022)
