= G. A. Grisenthwaite =

Canadian writer

Gordon Grisenthwaite is a Nlaka'pamux writer, and member of the Lytton First Nation, from Canada, whose debut novel Home Waltz was a shortlisted finalist for the Governor General's Award for English-language fiction at the 2021 Governor General's Awards.

A member of the Lytton First Nation, Grisenthwaite worked as a graphic designer in Vancouver and Kelowna, before completing his master's in English literature and creative writing at the University of Windsor in the 2020. He has published short stories and poetry in various Canadian literary magazines including The Antigonish Review and Prism International; his short story "The Fine Art of Frying Eggs" was the winner of the John Kenneth Galbraith Literary Award in 2013, and his short story "Splatter Patterns" was longlisted for the 2021 CBC Short Story Prize.
