= Alan R. Wilson =

Canadian novelist and poet

- Born: Moncton, New Brunswick, Canada
- Occupations: novelist, poet
- Writing career
- Period: 1990s–present
- Notable work: Before the Flood

Alan R. Wilson is a Canadian novelist and poet, who won the Amazon.ca First Novel Award in 1999 for his novel Before the Flood. The novel was also a shortlisted nominee for the Ethel Wilson Fiction Prize and the Stephen Leacock Award.

His prior publications include the poetry collections Animate Objects (1995), Counting to 100 (1996), and Sky Atlas (2008).

Originally from Moncton, New Brunswick, he currently resides in Victoria, British Columbia. His second novel, Lucifer's Hair, has been completed and is slated for future publication.
