= Brian Thomas Isaac =

Syilx writer from Canada

Brian Thomas Isaac (born 1950) is a Syilx writer from Canada, whose debut novel All the Quiet Places was published in 2021.

A member of the Okanagan Indian Band, Isaac grew up on the Okanagan reserve near Vernon, British Columbia. He worked in the logging, bricklaying and oil industries as an adult. Isaac pursued writing as a personal hobby until his retirement in the early 2000s, following which his wife Marlene submitted a piece of his writing to the Penticton Writer’s Conference, at which he won an award.

All the Quiet Places was published by Touchwood Editions in fall 2021. It was shortlisted for the 2022 Amazon.ca First Novel Award and the Governor General's Award for English-language fiction at the 2022 Governor General's Awards, and longlisted for the 2022 Giller Prize. It was also the winner of the Indigenous Voices Award for English Prose.

On May 27, 2025, Penguin Random House Canada released Isaac's second book Bones of a Giant, which revisits characters from All the Quiet Places and is the second book in a planned trilogy.
