= Shaena Lambert =

Canadian novelist and short story writer (born 1959)

- Born: 1959 (age 66–67); Vancouver, British Columbia, Canada
- Occupations: Novelist; short story writer
- Spouse: Bob Penner
- Children: 2
- Website: www.shaenalambert.com

Shaena Lambert (born 1959) is a Canadian novelist and short story writer.

== Biography ==
Born in Vancouver, British Columbia, she has lived in Toronto, New York City and the Okanagan. She lives in Vancouver, with her husband, political consultant Bob Penner. They have two children.

Lambert's writing has appeared in periodicals and literary journals including Ploughshares, Zoetrope: All-Story, Toronto Life and The Walrus.

Her first book, a collection of short stories titled The Falling Woman, was published in 2002 by Random House Canada. In 2003, it was published by Virago Press in the United Kingdom and Berlin Verlag in Germany. The Hamilton Spectator wrote of The Falling Woman: "In Shaena Lambert we have a writer with the ability to layer experience so that one layer comments on another, a writer with Alice Munro's understanding of the human heart and Yann Martel's gift for inhabiting the minds of vastly different characters." The Falling Woman was a finalist for The Danuta Gleed Award and was chosen as a Globe and Mail best book for 2002.

Lambert's novel, Radiance, was published in 2007 by Random House Canada, and by Virago Press in the U.K, again meeting with critical acclaim, and comparisons to Canadian writers Alice Munro and Carol Shields. Writing in The Globe and Mail, American novelist Richard Bausch called Radiance "a marvellous feat of imagining". Radiance tells the story of Hiroshima survivor named Keiko Kitigawa, who travels to the U.S. from Japan after the end of World War II, and the complex relationship she has with a Long Island housewife. Radiance was nominated for the Rogers Writers' Trust Fiction Prize in 2007; the Ethel Wilson Fiction Prize in 2008; and was a Globe and Mail Best Book.

Lambert's collection of stories, Oh, My Darling, was published by HarperCollins Canada in 2013. It was a Globe and Mail Best Book of 2013, a National Post Best Book of 2013, and was longlisted for the Frank O'Connor Award for the Short Story.

Lambert's novel, Petra, Random House Canada, 2020, is a fictional exploration of the life and death of Petra Kelly, the Green Party leader and political activist who fought for the planet and human rights in 1980s Germany at the height of the Cold War.

In 2026 she was the recipient of the Writers' Trust of Canada's Engle/Findley Award for her body of work.
