= Kung Jaadee =

British Columbian Haida traditionalist

Kung Jaadee (Roberta Kennedy)
- Kwii-Ge-Li-Ones
- Born: Haida Gwaii
- Occupations: Author, drummer
- Children: 1
- Writing career
- Genre: Children's literature
- Website: www.sharkhouse.ca

Kung Jaadee (Roberta Kennedy) is a traditional Haida storyteller, singer, drummer, teacher, and children's book author from the village of Old Massett, Haida Gwaii in Northern British Columbia, Canada.

Following Haida tradition, she passed the name Kwii-Ge-Ii-Ones (Big Loved Cloud) on to her daughter and the name Kung Jaadee (Woman in the Moon or Moon Woman) was given to her at her great uncle's memorial feast by her cousin.

== Storytelling, writing and teaching ==
Since 1996, Kung Jaadee has been performing her storytelling at festivals, schools, museums, conferences and Indigenous festivals across the United States and Canada. Kung Jaadee turned to storytelling when her son began attending school as a way to bring awareness to the Haida culture for which she was frequently discriminated against as a child. She is best known for her tellings of Raven stories, and was approached by a publisher to turn one of these stories into a book entitled Raven's Feast illustrated by Jessika von Innerebner and published by Medicine Wheel Education in 2016. She has a follow-up book, Gifts from the Raven, forthcoming in 2020. She has also contributed to educational books on the Haida Nation, and to academic publications on Indigenous health.

In 2014, she collaborated with Haida artist Gwaii Edenshaw and the Taiyuan Puppet Theatre Company from Taiwan to create a multicultural telling of the Raven story through shadow puppetry. The show was part of the Ouxi Taiwanese Puppetry Festival held at the Museum of Anthropology at UBC.

Kung Jaadee is a primary school teacher at Chief Matthews School in Old Massett and a teacher of Xaad Kil (Haida language).

== Recognition ==
Kung Jaadee was a Storyteller-in-Residence at the University of Manitoba in the Centre for Creative Writing and Oral Culture (2010). In 2016, she was a Gwaii Haanas artist-in-residence at the Haida Gwaii Museum.

== Publications ==
Children's books

- Raven's Feast / Festin du corbeau Kung Jaadee / translated by Veronique Aglat Victoria, British Columbia : Medicine Wheel Education, 2016. Available in an English and French version, with a Xaad Kil/Haida version in preparation.
- Haida Nation Kung Jaadee, in collaboration with Jaskwaan A. Bedard. Collingwood, Ontario : Beech Street Books, 2019. Series:Indigenous Communities in Canada (True North)
- Gifts from Raven Kung Jaadee Victoria, British Columbia : Medicine Wheel Education, 2019. The French version, Les Cadeaux du Corbeau, is to be published by Medicine Wheel Education in September 2020.

Chapters in edited volumes

- Her piece "Raven Healing" was included in Determinants of indigenous peoples' health : beyond the social / editors, Margo Greenwood, Sarah de Leeuw, Nicole Marie Lindsay.

== Appearances ==
- Ouxi Taiwanese Puppetry Festival as part of a cultural exchange.
- Performed during the Our Living Languages exhibition at the Royal BC Museum.
- 2017 Toronto Storytelling Festival.
