= Bill Gaston =

Canadian writer

Bill Gaston (born January 14, 1953, in Tacoma, Washington) is a Canadian novelist, playwright and short story writer. Gaston grew up in Winnipeg, Manitoba, Toronto, Ontario, and North Vancouver, British Columbia. Aside from teaching at various universities, he has worked as a logger, salmon fishing guide, group home worker and, most exotically, playing hockey in the south of France. He is married (to writer Dede Crane) with four children, including filmmaker Connor Gaston, and lives in Victoria BC, where he teaches at the University of Victoria.

He has three degrees from the University of British Columbia and played varsity hockey for the UBC Thunderbirds.

== Career ==
Gaston has published seven novels–Tall Lives (Macmillan, 1990, and Seal Books), The Cameraman (Macmillan 1994, and Raincoast, 2002), Bella Combe Journal (Cormorant, 1996), The Good Body (Stoddart, 2000 and U.S., HarperCollins, 2001, Raincoast, 2002, Anansi, 2009, nominated for the Relit Award), Sointula (Raincoast, 2004, nominated for the Ethel Wilson Award, and Relit Award, and Penguin, 2012), The Order of Good Cheer (Anansi, 2008), and The World (Penguin Canada/Hamish Hamilton, 2012, winner of the Ethel Wilson Prize for fiction). His short fiction collections are Deep Cove Stories, North of Jesus' Beans, the critically acclaimed Sex Is Red, Mount Appetite (Raincoast, 2002, nominated for the Giller Prize and the Ethel Wilson Fiction Prize),Gargoyles (Anansi, 2006, nominated for a Governor General's Award and winner of the Victoria Book Prize and ReLit Award), 'Juliet Was A Surprise' (Penguin Hamish Halmilton, 2014, nominated for the GG). His memoir, Midnight Hockey, an irreverent look at oldtimer beer leagues, was published by Doubleday in 2006. He has a collection of poetry, Inviting Blindness (Oolichan), the play Yardsale, and has written for television. His short fiction has been published in Granta (U.K.), and Tin House (U.S.), broadcast nationally on the CBC, and included in Best Canadian Stories, and has won the CBC Canadian Literary Award and National Magazine Award. In 2003 he was awarded the inaugural Timothy Findley Award for a body of work.

== Reviews ==
In 1999, the Globe & Mail wrote: "Given Gaston's body of work, he merits elevation into the leading ranks of Canadian authors. His writing is gentle, humorous, absurd, beautiful, spiritual, dark and sexy. He deserves to dwell in the company of Findley, Atwood and Munro as one of this country's outstanding literary treasures." Of Sex Is Red, the Toronto Star wrote: "Bill Gaston's latest story collection features his usual verve–lord, it seems he's actually having fun....Bill Gaston is the Eveready Bunny of the short story. May he keep on going and going." U.S. writer Thomas McGuane wrote: "The Good Body is a winning, moving book filled with an achy humanity and rueful, well-earned humor. Here are places and struggles we haven't already seen. Bill Gaston is a most valuable writer." "Bill Gaston is a writer of great empathy, capable, it seems, of getting beneath the skin of anybody." (2002 Giller Prize Jury–Barbara Gowdy, Thomas King, William New)

== Bibliography ==
=== Novels ===
- Tall Lives (1990)
- The Cameraman (1994)
- Bella Combe Journal (1996)
- The Good Body (2000)
- Sointula (2004)
- The Order of Good Cheer (2008)
- The World (2012)

=== Short stories ===
- Deep Cove Stories (1989)
- North of Jesus' Beans (1994)
- Sex is Red (1998)
- Mount Appetite (2002) (nominated for the Giller Prize
- Gargoyles (2006) (nominated for the 2006 Governor General's Award for fiction)
- Juliet Was a Surprise (2014) (nominated for the Governor General's Award for fiction)
- A Mariner's Guide to Self-Sabotage (2017) published by Douglas & McIntyre

=== Poetry ===
- Inviting Blindness (1995)

=== Drama ===
- Yardsale (1994)
- Ethnic Cleansing
- I am Danielle Steel

=== Non-fiction ===
- Midnight Hockey: All About Beer, the Boys and the Real Canadian Game (2006)
- Just Let Me Look At You: On Fatherhood (2018)
