= Brian Payton =

American novelist

- Born: 1966 (age 59–60); Los Angeles County, California, U.S.
- Education: University of Victoria
- Occupation: Writer
- Writing career
- Genres: Fiction; non-fiction
- Website: www.brianpayton.com

Brian Payton (born 1966) is an American-Canadian writer of fiction and nonfiction.

Born in Los Angeles County in 1966, Payton lived in California, Illinois, Texas, New Mexico, and Alaska before settling in British Columbia at the age of 16. He was educated at the Seminary of Christ the King and the University of Victoria.

Payton's first novel, Hail Mary Corner (Beach Holme), is a coming-of-age tale based on his experience living among fellow seminarians and Benedictine monks. His nonfiction writing about adventure, wildlife, and the environment has appeared in The New York Times, the Los Angeles Times, the Chicago Tribune, The Boston Globe, Canadian Geographic.

Shadow of the Bear: Travels in Vanishing Wilderness is a work of narrative nonfiction, which chronicles a personal search for the eight remaining bear species across continents, cultures, and memory.

Payton's book The Ice Passage: A True Story of Ambition, Disaster, and Endurance in the Arctic Wilderness (Doubleday Canada), is a narrative nonfiction account of the final voyage of HMS Investigator.

His latest book, a novel, The Wind is Not a River is set in Alaska during the Japanese invasion of the Aleutian Islands of Attu and Kiska. The New York Times, in a review posted on January 31, 2014, called the book "gripping" and "meditative."

Payton lives with his family on Vancouver Island.

== Bibliography ==
=== Fiction ===
Hail Mary Corner (2001)

=== Nonfiction ===
Brian Payton talks about The Ice Passage on Bookbits radio.

- The Ice Passage: A True Story of Ambition, Disaster, and Endurance in the Arctic Wilderness (2009)
- Shadow of the Bear: Travels in Vanishing Wilderness (2006)
- Literary Trips: Following in the Footsteps of Fame, Vol. 2] (anthology, 2001)
