= Nazanine Hozar =

Iranian Canadian writer (born 1978)

Nazanine Hozar (born 1978) is an Iranian Canadian writer, whose debut novel Aria was published in 2019.

Born in Tehran, Hozar moved to Canada with her family in childhood following the Iranian Revolution, and grew up in Surrey, British Columbia. She wrote the novel while pursuing her Master of Fine Arts in creative writing at the University of British Columbia.

In 2020, Aria was shortlisted for the Amazon.ca First Novel Award and the Ethel Wilson Fiction Prize.

Her second novel, The Small Ones, was published in 2026, and was shortlisted for the 2026 Giller Prize.
