= Sheung-King =

Aaron Sheung-King Tang, who publishes work as Sheung-King, is a Canadian writer whose novel Batshit Seven was the winner of the 2024 Atwood Gibson Writers' Trust Fiction Prize.

Born in Vancouver, British Columbia, Tang lived in both Canada and Hong Kong before moving to Toronto, Ontario. His first novel, You Are Eating an Orange. You Are Naked, was published in 2020 by Book*hug, and was a shortlisted nominee for the 2021 Amazon.ca First Novel Award and the 2021 Governor General's Award for English-language fiction.

Batshit Seven, his second novel, was published in 2024 by Penguin Random House.
