= Alix Hawley =

Canadian novelist and short-story writer (born 1975)

Alix Hawley (born 1975) is a Canadian novelist and short-story writer. Her novel, All True Not a Lie In It (Knopf 2015), won the amazon.ca First Novel Award in 2015.

== Early life and work ==
Hawley was born in Vancouver, British Columbia in 1975, but moved shortly afterwards to Kelowna, British Columbia, where she began writing early. She studied for her BA (Honors) in English Literature, with a minor in Nineteenth-Century Studies, at the University of British Columbia in Vancouver, where she won the Governor General's medal as the top graduating student in the faculty of Arts. She moved to the UK to complete a M.St. and D.Phil. under Hermione Lee's supervision at Somerville College, Oxford; her thesis discusses Virginia Woolf and nineteenth-century children's culture. She went on to complete an MA in Creative Writing (Fiction) at the University of East Anglia, studying with Andrew Motion, Richard Holmes, and Paul Magrs. Her favourite authors include Alice Munro, Patricia Highsmith, Virginia Woolf, Anita Brookner, Colm Toibin, Peter Carey and Hilary Mantel.

== Writing ==
Hawley's first book, The Old Familiar (Thistledown Press, 2008), is a collection of short stories; The Globe and Mail said: "'Genius' is a word I hesitate to use in a review; Hawley's work requires it." The book was longlisted for the ReLit award. Her story "Witching" won the CBC Literary Award for Short Fiction in 2017. "Jumbo" was runner-up in 2014, and "Tentcity" was runner-up in 2011. "Little Boy" was shortlisted in 2009. In 2013, Hawley's short story "Pig (for Oma)" was the winner of the Canada Writes "Bloodlines" short memoir contest. Her story was chosen from over 800 entries.

Her novel, All True Not a Lie In It (Knopf 2015), is a first-person account of Daniel Boone's captivity by the Shawnee, and was signed to Knopf as part of the New Face of Fiction Program. The novel won the amazon.ca First Novel Award and the BC Book Prize for Fiction in 2015, and was longlisted for the 2015 Scotiabank Giller Prize. The book won the Ethel Wilson Fiction Prize in 2016.

== Personal life ==
Hawley lives in Kelowna, British Columbia, with her family.
