= Daniel Zomparelli =

Canadian writer (born 1985)

Daniel Zomparelli (born 1985) is a Canadian writer from Vancouver, British Columbia. He is married to American screenwriter Gabe Liedman.

A 2006 graduate of Simon Fraser University, he worked for the magazine Adbusters before becoming founding editor of the poetry magazine Poetry Is Dead. He has since published the poetry collections Davie Street Translations and Rom Com, and the short fiction collection Everything Is Awful and You're a Terrible Person. Everything Is Awful was a shortlisted finalist for the 2018 Ethel Wilson Fiction Prize, and won the 2018 ReLit Award for short fiction.

== Works ==
- Davie Street Translations (2012)
- Rom Com (2015, with Dina Del Bucchia)
- Everything Is Awful and You're a Terrible Person (2017)
- Jump Scare (2024)
- Super Castle Fun Park (2026)
