= Brenda Damen =

Canadian writer

- Born: 1960 (age 65–66)

Brenda Damen is a Canadian writer. Her short story Gibson won the 2020 CBC Short Story Prize. The award is accompanied with $6,000 CAD.

Damen's story was selected from 2,400 other entries. She had been working on a manuscript for a novel for thirteen years, and plucked the story from that manuscript. The story is her first work to be published.

The panelists who selected her story were highly complimentary of her courage. After her selection the CBC published an interview with her, in which she tried to explain how she was able to write a story seen as inspirational about a youngster's abuse.
