= Claire Mulligan =

Canadian novelist and short story writer

- Occupations: novelist, short stories
- Writing career
- Period: 2000s–present
- Notable work: The Reckoning of Boston Jim

Claire Mulligan is a Canadian novelist and short story writer, whose debut novel The Reckoning of Boston Jim was a longlisted nominee for the Scotiabank Giller Prize in 2007, and a shortlisted finalist for the Ethel Wilson Fiction Prize in 2008.

Her second novel, The Dark, was published in 2013. She has also published short stories in The Antigonish Review, Grain, The Tulane Review and Canadian Author.

Originally from Kelowna, British Columbia, she currently resides on Vancouver Island, where she teaches in the continuing education program at Camosun College and is pursuing a master's degree in screenwriting at the University of Victoria.
