= Anne Fleming (writer) =

Canadian fiction writer (born 1964)

Anne Fleming (born 25 April 1964) is a Canadian fiction writer. Born in Toronto, Ontario, Fleming attended the University of Waterloo, enrolling in a geography program then moving to English studies. In 1991, she moved to British Columbia. She teaches at the University of British Columbia Okanagan campus in Kelowna. She formerly taught at the Victoria School of Writing.

Her fiction has been published in magazines and anthologies, including Toronto Life magazine, The Journey Prize Stories, and The New Quarterly, where it won a National Magazine Award.

Her first book, Pool-Hopping and Other Stories, was a finalist at the 1999 Governor General's Awards; it was also a contender for the Ethel Wilson Fiction Prize and the Danuta Gleed Award. Her second book is the novel, Anomaly (Raincoast Books 2005).

Aside from her literary endeavors, Fleming has hosted a radio program, played defense for the Vancouver Voyagers women's hockey team and also plays the ukulele. She has a partner and child. Fleming's great-grandfather was the mayor of Toronto, and Toronto figures prominently in her writing.

In 2013 she served alongside Amber Dawn and Vivek Shraya on the jury of the Dayne Ogilvie Prize, a literary award for LGBT writers in Canada, selecting C. E. Gatchalian as that year's winner.

Her novel Curiosities was shortlisted for the 2024 Giller Prize.

== Bibliography ==
- Pool-Hopping and Other Stories, 1998 (ISBN 1-896095-18-6)
- Anomaly, 2005 (ISBN 1-55192-831-0)
- Gay Dwarves of America, 2012 (ISBN 1897141467)
- poemw, 2016 (ISBN 1-897141-76-9)
- The Goat, 2017 (ISBN 1-55498-917-5)
- Curiosities, 2024

== See also ==
- List of University of Waterloo people
