= Murphy O. Shewchuk =

Canadian writer

Murphy Orlando Shewchuk is a Canadian writer. He is a past National President of the Canadian Authors Association. He currently resides in Merritt, British Columbia.

He grew up in the British Columbia gold-mining town of Pioneer Mines during the late 1950s. He developed a triple interest in outdoor exploration, photography and electronics while still a teenager. After a stint in the Royal Canadian Air Force in eastern Canada, he and his family moved back to British Columbia for a job in electronics with writing and photography as major side interests.

In 1971, his work took him to Kamloops, British Columbia, where he began writing a weekly "Outdoor Scene" column for the Kamloops Sentinel. From the column, he moved on to features in BC Outdoors and other magazines.

Shewchuk has also been managing editor of the 12th and 13th editions of The Canadian Writer's Guide, published by Fitzhenry & Whiteside of Toronto, Ontario.

In addition to a lifelong interest in writing, photography and exploring the mountains of western Canada, Shewchuk has been a workshop speaker at writer's conferences across Canada. He has received awards from the Outdoor Writers of Canada, the Northwest Outdoor Writers Association and the Canadian Authors Association.

He is one of the founding members and a current board member of the Nicola Valley Museum and Archives.

== Publications ==
- Exploring Kamloops Country (1973) Back country exploring in the Kamloops area.
- Fur, Gold & Opals (1975) Rockhounding, history and back country exploring.
- Exploring the Nicola Valley (1981) A guide to Merritt and the Nicola Valley.
- Cariboo
- The Craigmont Story (1983) The history of a mid 20th century copper mine.
- Backroads Explorer Vol. 1: Thompson-Cariboo (1985) Lytton to Barkerville.
- Backroads Explorer Vol. 2: Similkameen & South Okanagan (1988) Manning Park to Kelowna.
- Coquihalla Country: An Outdoor Recreation Guide (1990) Hope - Merritt - Kamloops.
- Okanagan Country: An Outdoor Recreation Guide. (1992) Osoyoos to the Shuswap.
- Coquihalla Country: A Guide to the North Cascade Mountains and the Nicola Valley (Complete update - 1997).
- Okanagan Trips & Trails: A Guide to Backroads and Hiking Trails in BC's Okanagan-Similkameen Region (co-authored with Judie Steeves in 1999).
