= Lydia Kwa =

Canadian writer and psychologist

- Born: 1959 (age 66–67); Singapore
- Occupations: novelist, short story writer, poet
- Writing career
- Period: 1990s–present
- Notable works: This Place Called Absence, The Walking Boy
- Website: www.lydiakwa.com

Lydia Kwa (born 1959 in Singapore) is a Canadian writer and psychologist.

First coming to Canada in 1980, Kwa studied psychology at the University of Toronto and Queen's University. She published one short story and a volume of poetry in the 1990s, but has concentrated primarily on novels since. In addition to her writing, she continues to practice as a clinical therapist in Vancouver, British Columbia. She was a nominee for the Amazon.ca First Novel Award in 2000, the ReLit Award in 2001 and the Lambda Literary Award for Lesbian Fiction in 2002 for This Place Called Absence, and for the Ethel Wilson Fiction Prize in 2006 for The Walking Boy.

She is an open lesbian.

== Works ==
- The Colour of Heroines (1994, poetry)
- This Place Called Absence (2000, novel)
- The Walking Boy (2005, novel)
- Pulse (2010, novel)
- Sinuous (2013, poetry)
- "The Right Hand" (2017, short story)
- Oracle Bone (2017, novel)
- The Walking Boy (2019, novel)--a rewrite of the 2005 novel, now a sequel to Oracle Bone
