= Diana Atkinson =

Canadian writer

- Born: Diana Wigod
- Occupation: novelist
- Writing career
- Period: 1990s
- Notable works: Highways and Dancehalls

Diana Atkinson (née Wigod) is a Canadian writer, who was a shortlisted nominee for the Governor General's Award for English-language fiction at the 1995 Governor General's Awards for her novel Highways and Dancehalls.

== Biography ==
Originally from Vancouver, British Columbia, she was diagnosed with ulcerative colitis as a child, and underwent frequent surgeries for the condition. By her teenage years, she was psychologically troubled by post-operative trauma from the surgeries, dropping out of high school and spending some time working as a stripper. Highways and Dancehalls was a roman à clef about her experience, although she resisted media attempts to sensationalize her past in the novel's promotion. At the time of the award nomination, Atkinson was completing a degree at Concordia University in Montreal.

The novel was also a shortlisted nominee for the 1995 Chapters First Novel Award. A French-language translation, titled Strip, was published in 1998.

Atkinson won a Western Magazine Award in 2000 for "Falling Slowly", an essay published in Vancouver Magazine, and was nominated for a National Magazine Award in the same year for "From the Gut", an essay published in Western Living.
