= Carol Windley =

Canadian short story writer and novelist

Carol Ann Windley (born 18 June 1947) is a Canadian short story writer and novelist.

== Biography ==
Carol Ann Windley was born in Tofino, British Columbia and raised in British Columbia and Alberta. Her debut short story collection, Visible Light (1993), won the 1993 Bumbershoot Award, and was nominated for the 1993 Governor General's Award for English Fiction and the 1994 Ethel Wilson Fiction Prize.

She followed in 1998 with her first novel, Breathing Underwater. In 2002, Windley won a Western Magazine Award for "What Saffi Knows", which later featured as the opening story in her short story collection Home Schooling (2006). That book was shortlisted for the 2006 Scotiabank Giller Prize.

Windley has also taught creative writing at Malaspina University-College.

== Bibliography ==
- Visible Light (1993)
- Breathing Underwater (1998)
- Home Schooling (2006)
- Midnight Train to Prague (2020)
