= Charlotte Gill =

Canadian fiction and non-fiction writer

Charlotte Gill is a Canadian fiction and non-fiction writer.

Gill holds a BA from the University of Toronto and an MFA from the University of British Columbia. Her short story collection Ladykiller won the Ethel Wilson Fiction Prize and the Danuta Gleed Literary Award in 2006, and was a finalist for the Governor General's Award for English-language fiction at the 2005 Governor General's Awards. Her non-fiction book Eating Dirt: Deep Forests, Big Timber, and Life with the Tree-Planting Tribe won the Hubert Evans Non-Fiction Prize in 2012, and was a shortlisted finalist for the Charles Taylor Prize and the Hilary Weston Writers' Trust Prize for Nonfiction.

Gill currently works with the University of King's College in Halifax, Nova Scotia as a writing mentor in the Master of Fine Arts in Fiction program. Gill and her husband both formerly worked as professionals tree planters.
