= Richard Willett =

Canadian-American fiction writer

Richard Willett is a Canadian-American fiction writer, playwright, and screenwriter. He was born in Hollywood, California, where his father, Bob Willett was a reporter covering the movies for the Canadian press. Willett grew up in Vancouver, Canada, and lived for many years in New York City.

== Life and career ==
Willett left Vancouver for New York at the age of nineteen and began writing short stories. His first published story appeared in Christopher Street in 1991. Subsequent stories appeared in Hawaii Review, Karamu, Oxalis, Art & Understanding, and American Writing, as well as a short play in Art & Understanding. His novel A Friend of Dorothy's, a semiautobiographical work written at the height of the AIDS epidemic in New York in the 1980s, was excerpted in Christopher Street and Permafrost and will be published in 2024.

In 1990, Willett was the recipient of an Edward F. Albee Foundation Fellowship and in 1993 he received a Tennessee Williams Scholarship from the Sewanee Writers’ Conference to study playwriting with Horton Foote and Wendy Hammond. In 1994, he joined Interborough Repertory Theatre's New Directions Theater, where his plays S.O.S., The Godsend, Hot Air, and Triptych were premiered off-off-Broadway. In 2001, he and his frequent director Eliza Beckwith spun off from IRT as a separate company called New Directions Theater (NDT), where they premiered Willett's Random Harvest, The Flid Show, and Tiny Bubbles. In 2022, his play A Terminal Event, which won a Julie Harris Playwrighting Award from the Beverly Hills Theatre Guild, was premiered at the Victory Theatre in Los Angeles. In 2023, 9/10 and Grief at High Tide are both scheduled for world premieres.

As a screenwriter Willett has twice been in the Top 50 of the Academy of Motion Picture Arts and Sciences' Nicholl Fellowships competition, a finalist for the Page International Screenwriting Awards as well as both the Sundance Screenwriting and Episodic Labs, and a semifinalist for the Austin Film Festival Screenplay Competition. A short film he wrote, The Gazebo, is scheduled to be shot in October 2023, and he has finished the script for an upcoming animated feature for children.
