= Michael Christie (writer) =

Canadian writer

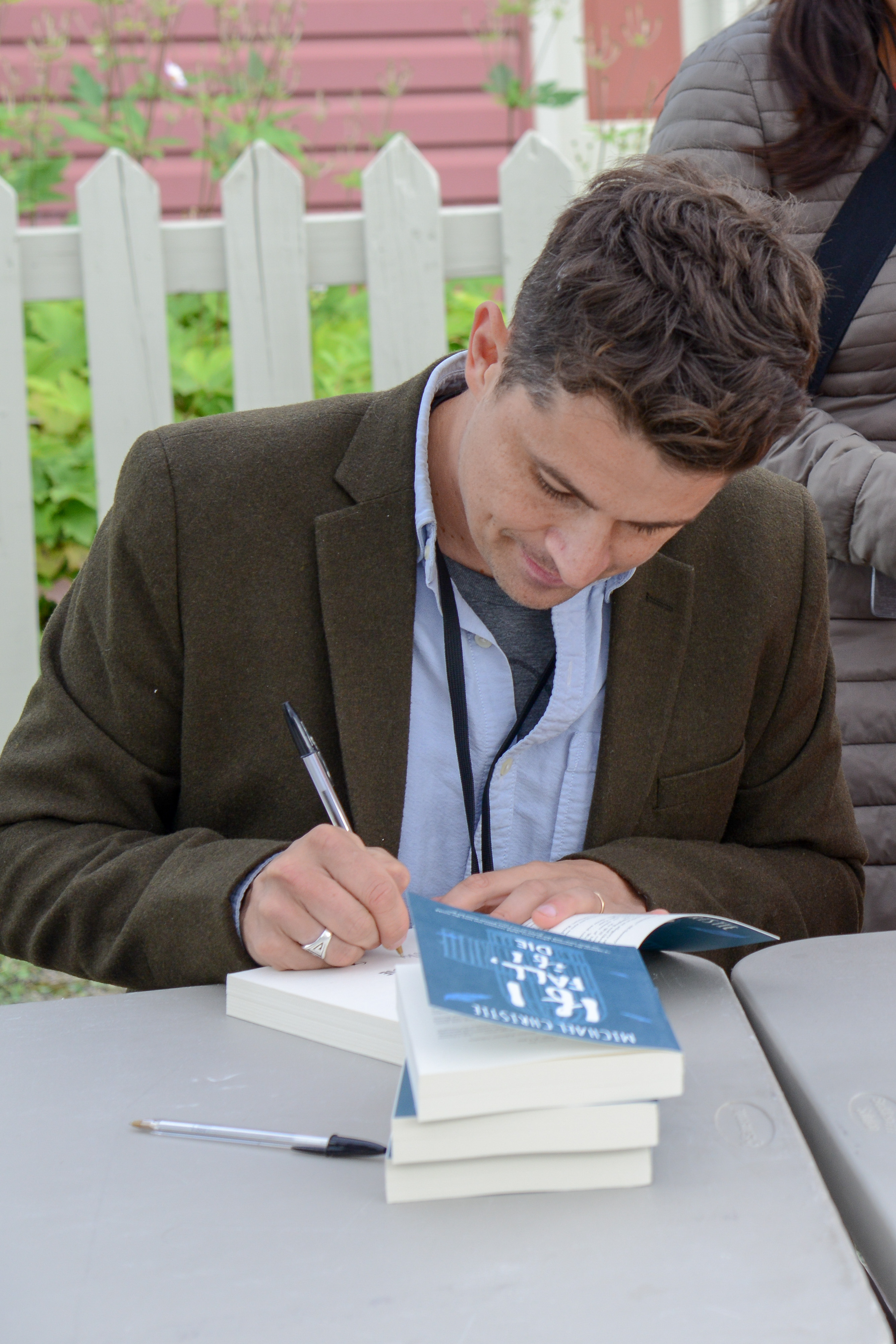
- Christie at the Eden Mills Writers' Festival in 2015
- Born: Thunder Bay, Ontario
- Occupation: Writer
- Writing career
- Period: 2010s–present
- Notable works: If I Fall, If I Die; The Beggar's Garden; Greenwood
- Website: michaelchristie.net

Michael Christie is a Canadian writer, whose debut story collection The Beggar's Garden was a longlisted nominee for the 2011 Scotiabank Giller Prize and a shortlisted nominee for the 2011 Rogers Writers' Trust Fiction Prize.

Born and raised in Thunder Bay, Ontario, Christie later moved to Vancouver, British Columbia to pursue professional skateboarding, and studied psychology at Simon Fraser University. He subsequently worked for several years in social services before returning to the University of British Columbia's creative writing program in 2008. He published The Beggar's Garden in early 2011.

The Beggar's Garden won the 2011 City of Vancouver Book Award.

His debut novel, If I Fall, If I Die, a coming-of-age-story about the son of a reclusive agoraphobic filmmaker who leaves home for the first time to search for a lost boy, was published early 2015 in the US by Hogarth, and in Canada by McClelland & Stewart. The novel was longlisted for the 2015 Giller Prize.

His second novel, Greenwood, was published in 2019 and was longlisted for the 2019 Giller Prize. Greenwood was also shortlisted for Forest of Reading's Evergreen Award, the Ethel Wilson Fiction Prize, and the Roderick Haig-Brown Regional Prize. In 2020, the novel won the Arthur Ellis Award for Best Novel. Greenwood was selected for the 2023 edition of Canada Reads, where it was championed by Keegan Connor Tracy.

== Bibliography ==
- The Beggar's Garden (HarperCollins Canada, 2011)
- If I Fall, If I Die (Hogarth, 2015)
- Greenwood (McClelland & Stewart, 2019)
