= Melanie Murray =

Canadian author

Melanie Murray is a Canadian author.

== Early life and education ==
She was born in the Northumberland Strait Peninsula of Malagash, Nova Scotia where her father worked in the salt mine after he returned from the Second World War. When the mine shut down in the mid-fifties, Murray's father re-enlisted in the military. While he was a soldier at CFB Gagetown in the 1960s, she grew up in the military town of Oromocto, New Brunswick.

Murray attended the University of New Brunswick to pursue her love of literature. After earning an Honours B.A. in English, a B.Ed., and an M.A. (Canadian literature), she travelled to British Columbia. Drawn to the temperate climate and fruitful abundance of the Okanagan Valley, Murray settled in Kelowna in 1987 where she taught English at Okanagan College and raised her two sons.

== Writing ==
Murray began writing her first book, For Your Tomorrow: The Way of an Unlikely Soldier, after her nephew, Jeff Francis, was killed in Afghanistan in 2007. She felt compelled to write his story, to create meaning out of his life and the chaos of his death. Quill & Quire's reviewer described it as "a worthy volume not just for those searching for catharsis, but also for a nation looking to bear witness to the full measure of our soldiers' sacrifice."

As of 2013, Murray was writing a book of historical fiction set in late eighteenth century Scotland.

Her 2017 book Should Auld Acquaintance: Discovering the Woman Behind Robert Burns describes the life of Jean Armour (1765–1834), wife of Scottish poet Robert Burns. Publishers Weekly's reviewer described it as a "compelling portrait of Armour's enduring commitment to Scotland's bawdy bard".

Murray's unpublished Nineteen Sixty-Eight was longlisted for the 2019 CBC Nonfiction prize.

== Selected publications ==
- Murray, Melanie (2011). For Your Tomorrow: The Way of an Unlikely Soldier. Random House. ISBN 978-0-30735-978-0.
- Murray, Melanie (2017). Should auld acquaintance: discovering the woman behind Robert Burns. Nightwood Editions. ISBN 978-0-88971-328-4.
