= Cathleen With =

Canadian writer and author

- Education: University of British Columbia
- Occupations: Novelist, teacher
- Writing career
- Language: English
- Genres: non-fiction, literary fiction, book reviews, screenplays
- Notable works: Having Faith in the Polar Girls' Prison (novel) (2009) skids (short stories) (2006)
- Notable awards: Ethel Wilson Fiction Prize; 2010

Cathleen With is a Canadian writer and author. Skids, her debut short story collection about Vancouver street kids from the Davie Village to the Downtown Eastside, was published in 2006 and was shortlisted for the 2007 ReLit Awards.

== Early life ==
With grew up in suburban Vancouver and was influenced by works such as Margaret Atwood's The Handmaid’s Tale, Nalo Hopkinson’s Brown Girl in the Ring, and novels by James Kirkwood.

== Career ==
With's work has been published in several literary journals, including The Antigonish Review, Grain and Fireweed. Her first novel Having Faith in the Polar Girls' Prison was published with Penguin Canada in 2009 and won the Ethel Wilson Fiction Prize.

In 2010, she received the Ethel Wilson Fiction Prize at the BC Book Prizes for Having Faith in the Polar Girls' Prison.

Though her work is fiction, many of the stories in Skids are based on her friends' voices, some now gone, and her own experiences battling addictions and depression in her youth.

With has also trained as a learning assistance, drama in education and English teacher, and works one on one with alternative youth who have trouble adapting to the public school system. She is currently a writing instructor in Vancouver.

== Selected works ==
- Optioned for Film: Skids
- 2012 Arsenal Pulp Press, Vancouver, British Columbia, Canada V6A: Writing from Vancouver's Downtown Eastside Editors John Asfour and Elee Kraljii-Gardiner
- 2009 Penguin Canada, Toronto, Ontario, Canada Having Faith in the Polar Girls' Prison
- 2006 Arsenal Pulp Press Vancouver, British Columbia, Canada Skids
