= Audrey Thomas =

Canadian novelist and short story writer

Audrey Thomas OC
- Born: Audrey Grace Callahan; 17 November 1935 (age 90) Binghamton, New York
- Occupation: Novelist and short story writer
- Education: Smith College (BA,1957); St Andrews University; University of British Columbia (MA, 1963)
- Years active: 1965–2014
- Notable awards: Marian Engel Award (1987); Ethel Wilson Fiction Prize (1984, 1990, 1995)

Audrey Grace Thomas (née Callahan; born 17 November 1935) is a Canadian novelist and short story writer who lives on Galiano Island, British Columbia. Her stories often have feminist themes and include exotic settings. She is a recipient of the Marian Engel Award and is an Officer of the Order of Canada.

== Life, education and career ==
Thomas was born 17 November 1935 in Binghamton, New York. She received a Bachelor of Arts degree from Smith College in Massachusetts in 1957, then studied at St. Andrews University in Scotland before teaching in England. In 1959, she immigrated to Canada, where she received a Master of Arts degree from University of British Columbia in 1963.

From 1964 to 1966, Thomas lived in Ghana, and some of her stories are set there and in other distant places.

Thomas lived in Edinburgh, Scotland in the 1980s, and wrote articles for Saturday Night Magazine.

Beginning in 1990, Thomas was a visiting professor at Concordia University in Montreal. She also spent time as writer-in-residence at the University of Victoria, University of British Columbia, Simon Fraser University, and David Thompson University Centre.

She published her first story, "If One Green Bottle...", in 1967. In 2014, she published her eighteenth book, Local Customs.

== Awards and honours ==
From 1984 to 1986, Thomas received the Canada-Scotland Writer's Literary Fellowship, and in 1987, she won the Marian Engel Award for her body of work. In 1989, she receive the Canada-Australia Literary Prize. In 1994, she received an honorary doctorate from Simon Fraser University. In 2003, she won the Terasen Lifetime Achievement Award, and in 2008, she was made an Officer of the Order of Canada.

Awards for Thomas's writing
Year	Title	Award	Result	Ref.
1966	"If One Green Bottle..."	Atlantic First Award	Winner	
1984	Intertidal Life	Ethel Wilson Fiction Prize	Winner	
1984	Intertidal Life	Governor General's Award for English-language fiction	Finalist	
1990	Wild Blue Yonder	Ethel Wilson Fiction Prize	Winner	
1995	Coming Down from Wa	Ethel Wilson Fiction Prize	Winner	
1996	Coming Down from Wa	Governor General's Award for English-language fiction	Finalist	
2006	Tattycoram	Ethel Wilson Fiction Prize	Shortlist	

== Bibliography ==
=== Novels ===
- Mrs. Blood – 1970
- Munchmeyer and Prospero on the Island – 1971
- Songs My Mother Taught Me – 1973
- Blown Figures – 1974
- Latakia – 1979
- Intertidal Life – 1984
- Graven Images – 1993
- Coming Down from Wa – 1995
- Isobel Gunn – 1999
- Tattycoram
- Local Customs – 2014

=== Short stories ===
- Ten Green Bottles – 1967
- Ladies and Escorts – 1977
- Real Mothers – 1981
- Two in the Bush and Other Stories – 1981
- Goodbye Harold, Good Luck – 1986
- The Wild Blue Yonder – 1990
- The Path of Totality – 2001
