= Andrea MacPherson =

Canadian poet and novelist

Andrea MacPherson is a Canadian poet and novelist.

== Biography ==
Born in 1976 in Vancouver, British Columbia, she was educated at the University of British Columbia where she received a Master's Degree in Creative Writing. She works as a freelance editor and lecturer, and currently teaches writing with Vancouver Island University (VIU) and Simon Fraser University (SFU)'s writing and publishing program, and with the University of the Fraser Valley (UFV). MacPherson also taught writing classes at various colleges (VIU, UFV, and KPU were all upgraded to university status from university colleges in 2008), including Kwantlen Polytechnic University (KPU) and the University of the Fraser Valley. She served as editor of Prism International.

MacPherson was the Editor of Prism International from 2000 to 2001 and took over the position of Reviews Editor with Event in 2006. She held the position until 2010.

MacPherson's first novel, When She Was Electric, was published in 2003 with Raincoast. The novel later went on to be named No. 6 on Canada Reads: People's Choice. Her second novel, Beyond the Blue, was published in 2007 by Random House Canada and details the lives of four women in 1918 Dundee, Scotland.

Natural Disasters was released in July 2007 by Palimpsest Press and is concerned with shared history and the influence of geography on the self, detailing much of the landscape of British Columbia. It was longlisted for the 2008 ReLit Awards. Her second collection, Away was published in 2008 by Signature Editions. It is a collection of travel poems, ranging from an execution yard in Dublin, Ireland to the calderas of Santorini, Greece. Her poetry was anthologized in 2009's How the Light Gets In, published by the Waterford Institute of Technology, Ireland.

== Selected works ==
- 2003: When She Was Electric Raincoast
- 2007: Beyond the Blue Random House
- 2007: Natural Disasters Palimpsest Press
- 2008: Away: Poems Signature Editions
- 2009: How the Light Gets In Waterford Institute
