= Joan Haggerty =

Canadian novelist

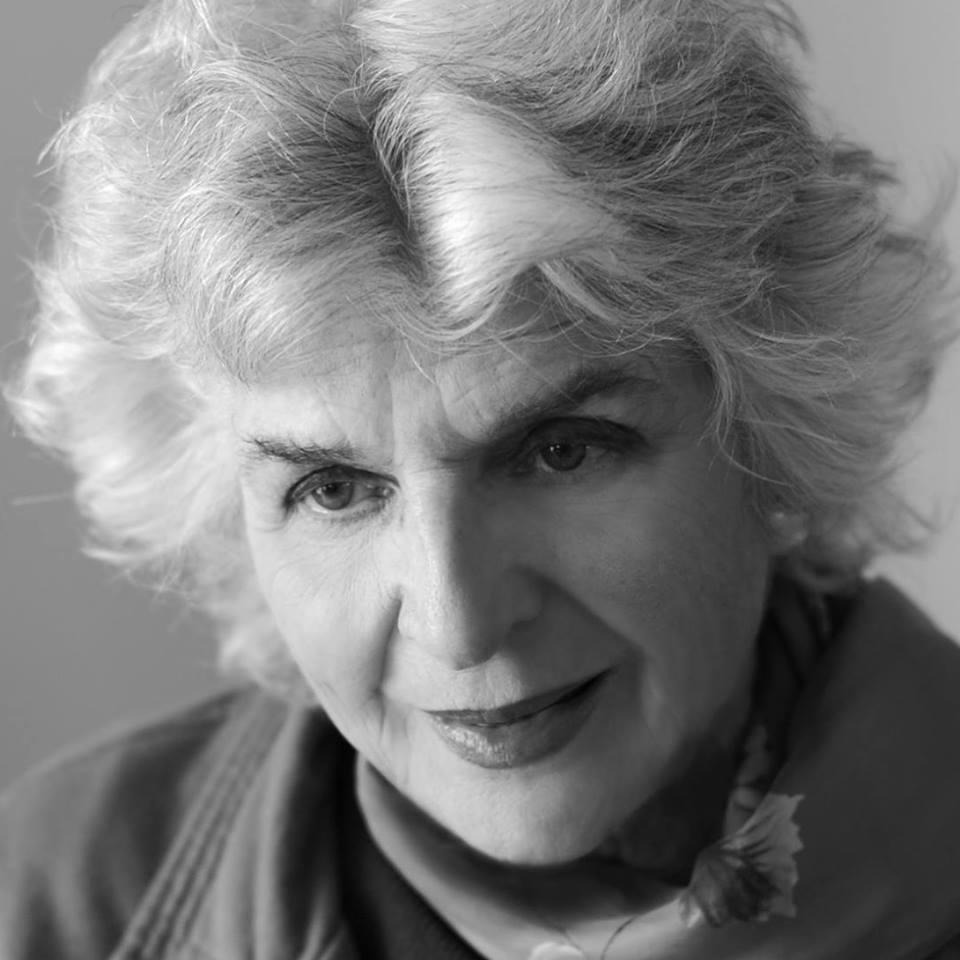
- Born: Vancouver, British Columbia

Joan Haggerty (born 26 April 1940) is a Canadian novelist.

Born in Vancouver, British Columbia, she studied English and Theatre at the University of British Columbia. From 1962 to 1972, she lived in London, England; Formentera, Spain; and New York City. She now lives in Telkwa, British Columbia, above the Widzin'kwa River.

== Literary career ==
=== Please, Miss, Can I Play God? Notes and Sketches based on an adventure in dramatic play. Methuen, London, 1966. Bobbs-Merrill, NYC, 1966. ===
A book to trap any teacher who reads it into the same splendid, difficult, important heresies.

— Edward Blishen, The Listener, London (on Please, Miss, Can I Play God?)

Joan Haggerty's first book is an early 1960s exploration of creative drama in an east end London, England elementary school. As a young teacher, she discovers that children learn best through play; by acting out their interpretations of the classics and developing their own dramas, they come to embrace the institutions of theatre as their own.

=== Daughters of the Moon. Bobbs-Merrill, NYC, 1971. ===
Joan Haggerty is such a strong writer, so personal -- with such prose. She'll be read with appreciation for her talent, of course, but also for the fact that she always writes about what moves and hurts people.

— John Irving

Set in Spain and England, Daughters of the Moon is a novel told from the point of view of a woman in labour. It begins with the first contraction and ends with the birth. Each contraction expands the protagonist's consciousness into the realm of touch and memory; the story unfolds in shifting dimensions of time and space as she re-lives the moments that bring the arrival of her daughter.

=== The Invitation: A Memoir of Family Love and Reconciliation. Douglas & McIntyre, Vancouver/Toronto, 1994. ===
It is exciting to find a book so moving, sensual, and compelling that getting to the end of it is both urgent and dreaded.

— Quill & Quire

The Invitation is a memoir about the author's son, her second child, who grew up with a couple in Paris. It tells the story of their reunion in France and their later visits in Vancouver, B.C. It was nominated for Governor General's Award in 1994.

=== The Dancehall Years. Mother Tongue Publishing Ltd., Saltspring Island, B.C., 2016. ===
Fluidity, sensuality, a dreamlike quality, and factual reality are not usually possible in one novel. Here, miraculously, they blend in an intricate and intimate geography of time and place, people and personal mythologies in a gorgeously rendered novel.

— Vancouver Sun

Both an epic adventure and an interracial drama, this family saga begins one summer on Bowen Island and in Vancouver during the Depression and moves through Pearl Harbor, the evacuation of the Japanese and three generations into the 1980s.

== Bibliography ==
- Please, Miss, Can I Play God? - 1966
- Daughters of the Moon - 1971
- The Invitation: A Memoir of Family Love and Reconciliation - 1994 (nominated for a Governor General's Award)
- The Dancehall Years - 2016
