= Cedar Bowers =

Canadian writer

- Born: Vancouver, British Columbia
- Occupation: Writer
- Writing career
- Period: 2020s–present
- Notable work: Astra
- Website: www.cedarbowers.com

Cedar Bowers is a Canadian writer, whose debut novel Astra was longlisted for the 2021 Giller Prize. The novel traces the life from childhood through middle age of Astra, a woman who grew up on an agricultural commune in British Columbia, through the third-person perspectives of various other figures in her life.

In addition to Astra, Bowers has published short stories in various literary magazines.

Bowers lives in Galiano Island and Victoria, British Columbia.
