= Zoey Leigh Peterson =

American-Canadian novelist

Zoey Leigh Peterson is an American-Canadian novelist, who received a longlisted Scotiabank Giller Prize nomination in 2017 for her debut novel Next Year, For Sure. The novel, about a happy couple's year-long experiment with polyamory, was published in 2017 by Doubleday Canada.

Born in England to a United States Air Force family, Peterson was raised throughout the United States before moving in her early 20s to Philadelphia, where she lived in a communal home and was a musician with the local punk rock band Freemartin. She later moved to Vancouver, British Columbia, where she has lived since the late 1990s and works as a librarian.
