= Annabel Lyon =

Canadian novelist and short-story writer

- Born: 1971 (age 54–55); Brampton, Ontario, Canada
- Education: Simon Fraser University (BA) University of British Columbia (MFA)
- Occupations: Novelist and short-story writer

Annabel Lyon (born 1971) is a Canadian novelist and short-story writer. She has published two collections of short fiction, two young adult novels, and two adult historical novels, The Golden Mean and its sequel, The Sweet Girl.

== Life and work ==
Born in Brampton, Ontario, Lyon grew up in Coquitlam, British Columbia, where she and her family moved when she was a year old. She completed her Bachelor of Arts in Philosophy at Simon Fraser University and an MFA in Creative Writing at the University of British Columbia. In addition, she attended the University of British Columbia's Faculty of Law for one year.

Lyon published her first book, Oxygen, a collection of stories, in 2000. The Best Thing for You, a collection of three novellas, followed in 2004 and was nominated for the Ethel Wilson Fiction Prize.

Her first novel, The Golden Mean, which imagines the relationship between Alexander the Great and his teacher, Aristotle, was published in 2009. It held the distinction of being the only book nominated that year for all three of Canada's major fiction prizes: the Scotiabank Giller Prize, the Governor General's Award for English-language fiction, and the Rogers Writers' Trust Fiction Prize. Of the three, she won the Rogers Prize. The book has been translated into six languages. A sequel, The Sweet Girl, which explores the life of Aristotle's daughter, Pythias, was published in September 2012.

Her novel Consent was longlisted for the Giller Prize in 2020.

=== Involvement in the Steven Galloway defamation case ===
In 2021, former UBC professor Steven Galloway lodged defamation lawsuits against Lyon and over 20 others on the grounds that they had helped perpetuate false allegations of sexual assault and misconduct against him in 2015. After an extensive pre-trial process she reached a confidential settlement with Galloway in 2026, a few months before the trial was due to proceed.

At the 2026 trial (in which she was no longer a defendant), Lyon testified that in 2013 she had served as the accuser's secondary thesis supervisor prior to the alleged sexual assault. When the accuser submitted an incomplete thesis draft consisting of a portion of a novel, Lyon expressed discomfort about signing off but deferred to the primary supervisor, Keith Maillard, and agreed to accept the unfinished work despite never reading it, something she testified she regrets to this day. Lyon's also testified that UBC had given the accuser a postgraduation bursary of $30,000, to which she was not entitled.

Lyon further testified that she believed the accuser’s account of the allegations, spoke with her by telephone, and, at the accuser’s request, relayed the claims (including a stated intention to go to national media if the university did not act) to faculty colleagues and senior administrators. She described herself as having acted as a “conduit” for the information and said she did not attempt to verify it. She also shared an unsubstantiated report compiled by former student Chelsea Rooney that claimed additional complaints against Galloway.

== Awards and honors ==
Awards for Lyon's writing
| Year | Title | Award | Result | Ref. |
|---|---|---|---|---|
| 2005 | The Best Thing for You | Ethel Wilson Fiction Prize | Shortlist | |
| 2009 | The Golden Mean | Giller Prize | Shortlist | |
| 2009 | The Golden Mean | Governor General's Award for English-language fiction | Finalist | |
| 2009 | The Golden Mean | Rogers Writers' Trust Fiction Prize | Winner | |
| 2010 | The Golden Mean | Ethel Wilson Fiction Prize | Shortlist | |
| 2012 | The Sweet Girl | Giller Prize | Longlist | |
| 2020 | Consent | Giller Prize | Longlist | |
| 2021 | Consent | Ethel Wilson Fiction Prize | Shortlist | |

== Bibliography ==
=== Short fiction ===
- Oxygen (2000) McClelland & Stewart
- The Best Thing for You (2004) McClelland & Stewart
- Saturday Night Function (2004) Biblioasis
- Imagining ancient women. 2012. Henry Kreisel Memorial Lecture Series, University of Alberta Press

=== Novels ===
- All-Season Edie (2009) Orca Book Publishers ISBN 978-1-55143-713-2
- The Golden Mean (2009) Random House Canada ISBN 978-0-307-35620-8
- Encore Edie (2010) Puffin Canada
- The Sweet Girl (2012) Random House Canada ISBN 978-0-307-35944-5
- Consent (2020)
