= Pauline Holdstock =

British-Canadian novelist, essayist and short fiction writer

- Born: 1948 (age 77–78); England, United Kingdom

Pauline Holdstock is a British-Canadian novelist, essayist and short fiction writer with a focus on historical fiction. Born and raised in England, she came to Canada in 1974, and resides in Victoria, British Columbia. After a ten-year teaching career in the UK, the Caribbean, and Canada, she wrote her first novel. The Blackbird's Song (1989) launched her professional full-time writing career when it was shortlisted for the Books in Canada/W.H. Smith Best First Novel Award and subsequently reviewed favourably in the UK. She is the author of ten works of fiction and non-fiction in addition to reviews and articles for national newspapers and for websites. Her books have been published in the UK, the US, Portugal, Brazil, Australia and Germany as well as in Canada. Her novel Beyond Measure brought Holdstock's work to a wider audience, being a finalist for both the Giller Prize and the Commonwealth Writers' Prize and winning the BC Book Prizes Ethel Wilson Fiction Award. Her novella The World of Light Were We Live, as yet unpublished in book form, was the winner of the Malahat Review Novella Contest 2006. Into the Heart of the Country, the story of Samuel Hearne's surrender of Prince of Wales Fort, was published in 2011 and longlisted for the Giller Prize. Her most recent novel, The Hunter and the Wild Girl, listed as a best book for 2015 by both the CBC and the National Post, was a finalist for the BC Book Prizes in 2016 and went on to win the City of Victoria Butler Book prize. Holdstock's other literary activities include presentations, sessional teaching (University of Victoria), mentoring (Banff Centre for the Arts), adjudicating arts awards and co-producing a literary reading series.

== Bibliography ==
=== Fiction ===
- The Blackbird's Song (1987), ISBN 0-88924-191-0
- The Burial Ground (1991), ISBN 0-921586-25-6
- House (1994), ISBN 0-88878-353-1
- Swimming from the Flames (1995), ISBN 0-88801-182-2
- The Turning (1996), ISBN 0-921586-53-1
- Beyond Measure (2003), ISBN 1-896951-49-X (published in the U.S. as A Rare and Curious Gift)
- Into the Heart of the Country (2011), ISBN 978-1-55468-634-6
- The Hunter and the Wild Girl (2015), ISBN 978-0864928627 and pb (2018), ISBN 9781773100449

=== Non-fiction ===
- Mortal Distractions (2004), ISBN 1-894345-66-5

=== Anthologies ===
- 2016: Best Canadian Stories: 16, Oberon (ed. John Metcalf), 'Release'
- 2014: Best Canadian Stories: 14, Oberon (ed. John Metcalfe), 'Perfect Obedience'
- 2011: Framing the Garden, Ekstasis (ed. Linda Rogers), 'If', ISBN 9781897430743, ISBN 1897430744
- 2008: Great Expectations, Anansi (eds Dede Crane, Lisa Moore), 'Animalia'
- 2008: Imagining British Columbia, Anvil Press (ed. Daniel Francis) 'Ship of Fools'
- 2007: Apples Under the Bed, Hedgerow Press (ed. Joan Coldwell) 'From the Trestles of the Green Knight'
- 2006: radiant danse uv being: a poetic portrait of bill bissett, Nightwood Editions (eds Pew & Roxborough), 'Considering bill'
- 2003: Reading The Peninsula, CACSP (ed. Sara Dowse), 'The Turn of the Year', ISBN 0-9733471-0-4
- 2002: Brothers, Borders and Babylon, Jervis Distributors (ed. M. Florczak), 'Untitled: Heathrow', ISBN 0-9733471-0-4
- 2001: Young Blood, Exile Editions (ed.Barry Callaghan), 'Fractured Symmetry'
- 2000: Valentine's Day, Duckworth, London, UK (ed. Alice Thomas Ellis), 'Sitting Pretty'
- 2000: Going Places, Coteau (ed. Lynne Van Luven), 'Of Remnants and Riches'
- 2000: Moosemilk: The Best of..., DC Books (ed. P. Sontag, G.Loewen), 'Finding The Body', ISBN 978-0919688520, ISBN 0919688527
- 1997: The Moosehead Anthology, DC Books (ed. Robert Allen), 'Fall of Angels', 'Behind Glass', 'Finding The Body' 1997, ISBN 0-919688-37-3
- 1992: Snapshots : The New Canadian Fiction, Black Moss Press (ed. K Russelo) 'Catching The News', 'He's All Right But His Wife', 'The We-Must-Be-Crazy Birthday Sale,' 'Waiting For Margot', ISBN 978-0-88753-256-6
- 1984: True North/Down Under, Eleftheria (ed. Kevin Roberts), 'Burning Bright'

=== Short fiction Canada ===
- 'Hanged Man' The Puritan, online, 2017
- 'Mirror, Mirror', FoundPress, online and e-Pub, 2013
- 'Maternity Suit', Joyland, online, 2012
- 'What Endures', FoundPress, online and e-Pub, 2011
- 'Release', Blood & Aphorisms, Spring, 1998
- 'In This Country' Geist, May 1997
- 'The Twelve Twists Of Christmas', Monday Magazine, 12/25/97
- 'Something Untoward', Matrix. Spring 1994
- 'The Devil and the Deep' NeWest Review, Jan/Dec 93/94
- 'Finding The Body', Malahat Review, January 1993
- 'Faces', Exile, Vol.15/4 1992
- 'Samson's Wife', Exile, Vol.31/3 1989
- 'The Spirit Who Longed To Be Mortal', Event, Summer 1989
- 'Lost and Found', Grain, Spring 1988
- 'Bloody Dog', NeWest Review, December 1986
- 'The Fabric of Bridges', New Quarterly, 1986
- 'The Turn of the Year', Event, Summer 1986
- 'Hagar' Malahat Review, March 1986
- 'Secluded Setting, Close Beach', New Quarterly, Fall 1985
- 'Memento' Antigonish Review 62-63 1985
- 'A Fairy Tale', Waves, Fall 1985
- 'Blind Spot', Pierian Spring Autumn 1985
- 'Only Yesterday', Grain, February 1985
- 'Sitting Pretty', This Magazine, December 1984
- 'The Swimming Story', Grain, August 1984
- 'Burning Bright', Waves, Spring 1984
- 'The Circle of Hemlock', Pierian Spring, 1984
- 'Going Back', Event, June 1983
- 'May Wine', Flare, August 1982

=== Short Fiction U.K. ===
- 'The Terminal', Iron, 1993
- 'Samson's Wife', Critical Quarterly, Vol 31/3 1989
- 'Faces', Iron, June 1991
- 'And Songs Into Lamentations, Acumen, Spring 1991
- 'The Master's Bedroom', Ambit, 120 1990

=== Poetry ===
'If', Framing the Garden, Eksatasis, Victoria, 2011; Fall of Angels, Moosehead #6, 1997; 'Mouths of the Amazon', Matrix, Number 46; Mouths of the Amazon chapbook, fingerprinting inkoperated, 1995; 'Fractured Symmetry', Exile Vol. 12/3, 1988; 'Canticle' Rampike, Vol 6 /2, 1988; 'Transpositions', Rampike, Vol.4 2-3, 1985;

=== Reviews and essays ===
Review of Eimear McBride's The Lesser Bohemians, The National Post, 29/09/16; Review of Muriel Barbery's The Life of Elves, The Globe & Mail, 13/02/16; 'Finding Time', essay, online mysmallpresswritingday.blogspot, Apr 2018 'Enter at Your Own Risk', essay, online Margin, May 2006; Review of Michel Faber's The Courage Consort, The Globe & Mail, 12/18/04; Review of Alison Watt's The Last Island, Wordworks, Fall 2004; 'Catch', essay, online, opendemocracy, January 2004; Review of Trezza Azzopardi's Remember Me, The Globe & Mail 04/17/04; Review of Patrick McCabe's Call Me the Breeze, The Globe & Mail 12/03/04; 'Truth To Tell', essay, online, dooneyscafe.com, June 2004; Review of Lynn Coady's Saints of Big Harbour, The Vancouver Sun, 3/9/02; Review of Blanche Howard's Penelope's Way, The National Post, 6/2/02; Review of Melissa Hardy's The Uncharted Heart, The National Post, 7/14/01; Review of Barbara Hodgson's Hippolyte's Island, Vancouver Sun, 9/1/01; 'An Estate Held In Socage', photo essay, Matrix, Jan 2001; 'It's My Idea', essay, The National Post, 01/27/01; 'Flying Down to Reno', essay, CBC, Nov 2001; 'You Must Remember This', essay, Vancouver Sun, 11/11/00; 'Ship of Fools' winner Personal Essay Prize, Prairie Fire, Fall 2000; 'The Wicked Queen Lurks...', essay, Vancouver Sun, 10/16/93;
