= Indigenous Voices Awards =

Canadian literary award

The Indigenous Voices Awards are a Canadian literary award program, created in 2017 to honour Indigenous literatures in Canada. It is administered by the Indigenous Literary Studies Association, a non-profit organization that promotes the production, study and teaching of Indigenous literatures.

The awards grew out of a 2017 controversy, when a group of Canadian writers were criticized for campaigning on Twitter in favour of a prize supporting cultural appropriation. In response, Toronto lawyer Robin Parker launched a crowdfunding campaign to create a new prize for First Nations, Métis and Inuit writers in Canada. The crowdfunding campaign was set with a goal of $10,000, but ultimately attracted over $140,000 in donations.

The awards honour both published and unpublished work by Indigenous writers in Indigenous languages, English and French. The first winners were announced in May 2018. On National Indigenous Peoples Day, June 21, 2022, IVA announced that an anthology of selected works by the finalists will be published by Penguin Random House Canada in 2023 to celebrate the 5th anniversary of the award.

== Recipients ==
Indigenous Voices Awards winners
Year	Category	Author	Title	Award
2018	Alternative Format	Mich Cota	Musical Selections	Winner
2018	Alternative Format	Mika Lafond	Nipê Wânîn	Winner
2018	Alternative Format	Keith Barker	This is How We Got Here	Finalist
2018	Alternative Format	Cliff Cardinal	Huff & Stitch	Finalist
2018	English Poetry	Billy-Ray Belcourt	This Wound Is a World	Winner
2018	English Poetry	Tenille K. Campbell	#IndianLovePoems	Finalist
2018	English Poetry	Joshua Whitehead	Full-Metal Indigiqueer	Finalist
2018	English Prose	Aviaq Johnston	Those Who Run in the Sky	Winner
2018	English Prose	Carleigh Baker	Bad Endings	Finalist
2018	English Prose	Dawn Dumont	Glass Beads	Finalist
2018	English Prose	Joanne Robertson	The Water Walker	Finalist
2018	French Prose	J. D. Kurtness	De Vengeance	Winner
2018	French Prose	Naomi Fontaine	Manikanetish	Finalist
2018	Unpublished English Poetry	Smokii Sumac	#haikuaday and other poems	Winner
2018	Unpublished English Poetry	David Agecoutay	Poetic Selections	Finalist
2018	Unpublished English Poetry	Brandi Bird	Two Poems	Finalist
2018	Unpublished English Poetry	Francine Merasty	Poetry of a Northern Rez Girl	Finalist
2018	Unpublished French Poetry	Marie-Andrée Gill	Uashteu	Winner
2018	Unpublished Prose	Elaine McArthur	Queen Bee	Winner
2018	Unpublished Prose	Treena Chambers	Hair Raizing	Finalist
2018	Unpublished Prose	Nazbah Tom	The Hand Trembler	Finalist
2018	Unpublished Prose	Amanda Peters	Pejipug (Winter Arrives)	Finalist
2019	Alternative Format	Tasha Spillett and Natasha Donovan	Surviving the City	Winner
2019	Alternative Format	Kìzis	Wàsakozi	Finalist
2019	English Poetry	Smokii Sumac	You are Enough: Love Poems for the End of the World	Winner
2019	English Poetry	Wanda John-Kehewin	Seven Sacred Truths	Finalist
2019	English Poetry	Jules Arita Koostachin	Unearthing of Secrets, Gathering of Truths	Finalist
2019	English Prose	Tanya Tagaq	Split Tooth	Winner
2019	English Prose	Lindsay Nixon	nîtisânak	Finalist
2019	English Prose	Joshua Whitehead	Jonny Appleseed	Finalist
2019	French Prose	Joséphine Bacon	Uiesh, Quelque Part	Winner
2019	French Prose	Pierrot Ross-Tremblay	Nipimanitu – L’esprit de l’eau	Winner
2019	Indigenous Language	Francine Merasty	Iskotew Iskwew	Winner
2019	Unpublished English Poetry	Elaine McArthur	Brush of a Bustle	Winner
2019	Unpublished English Poetry	Autumn Schnell	FemmNDN Commandments	Finalist
2019	Unpublished English Poetry	Craig Commanda	My Ghosts Roam this Land and other poems	Finalist
2019	Unpublished English Prose	Francine Cunningham	Teenage Asylums	Winner
2019	Unpublished English Prose	Blair Yoxall	Little Bull	Finalist
2019	Unpublished English Prose	Brittany Johnson	Transit	Finalist
2020	Alternative Format	Elaine McArthur	Elizabeth Dances Pow-wow	Winner
2020	Alternative Format	Phyllis Webstad	Phyllis's Orange Shirt	Finalist
2020	English Poetry	Michelle Sylliboy	Kiskajeyi—I am Ready	Winner
2020	English Poetry	Arielle Twist	Disintegrate / Dissociate	Winner
2020	English Poetry	Brandi Bird	I Am Still Too Much	Finalist
2020	English Poetry	Francine Cunningham	On/Me	Finalist
2020	English Prose	Jesse Thistle	From the Ashes	Winner
2020	English Prose	Helen Knott	In My Own Moccasins	Finalist
2020	English Prose	Kaitlyn Purcell	ʔbédayine	Finalist
2020	French Poetry	Maya Cousineau Mollen	Bréviaire du matricule 082	Winner
2020	French Poetry	Marie-Andrée Gill	Chauffer le dehors	Winner
2020	French Prose	Naomi Fontaine	Shuni — Ce que tu dois savoir, Julie	Winner
2020	French Prose	J. D. Kurtness	Aquariums	Finalist
2020	Indigenous Language	Rene Meshake	Injichaag: My Soul in Story	Winner
2020	Indigenous Language	Cole Pauls	Dakwäkãda Warriors	Winner
2020	Unpublished Poetry in English	Keely Shirt	Two Little Foxes, Buttertown Beach, and I Will Never Be Happier	Winner
2020	Unpublished Poetry in English	David Agecoutay	Willow A Quartet	Finalist
2020	Unpublished Poetry in English	Corri Daniels	A Memory of Mary	Finalist
2020	Unpublished Prose in English	Cody Caetano	Half-Bads in White Regalia	Winner
2020	Unpublished Prose in English	Treena Chambers	Forest Fires and Falling Stars	Finalist
2020	Unpublished Prose in English	Steven Hall	Gatzi Naka	Finalist
2021	English Prose	Nathan Niigan Noodin Adler	Ghost Lake	Winner
2021	English Prose	Jenn Ashton	People Like Frank	Finalist
2021	English Prose	Michelle Good	Five Little Indians	Finalist
2021	English Prose	Michael Hutchinson	The Case of the Missing Auntie	Finalist
2021	English Prose	Katłįà Land-Water-Sky	Ndè-Tı-Yat’a	Finalist
2021	English Creative Nonfiction and Life-Writing	Bevann Fox	Genocidal Love	Winner
2021	English Creative Nonfiction and Life-Writing	Karen Pheasant-Neganigwane	Powwow: A Celebration through Song and Dance	Finalist
2021	English Creative Nonfiction and Life-Writing	Michelle Porter	Approaching Fire	Finalist
2021	English Poetry	jaye simpson	it was never going to be okay	Winner
2021	English Poetry	Norma Dunning	Eskimo Pie: A Poetics of Inuit Identity	Finalist
2021	English Poetry	shalan joudry	Waking Ground	Finalist
2021	English Poetry	Tyler Pennock	Bones	Finalist
2021	French Poetry	Shayne Michael	Fif et sauvage	Winner
2021	French Poetry	Félix Perkins	Boiteur des bois	Finalist
2021	French Prose	Émilie Monnet	Okinum	Winner
2021	French Prose	Jocelyn Sioui	Mononk Jules	Finalist
2021	Graphic Novels, Comics, and Illustrated Books	Brianna Jonnie with Nahanni Shingoose, Neal Shannacappo (illus.)	If I Go Missing	Winner
2021	Graphic Novels, Comics, and Illustrated Books	Lisa Boivin	I Will See You Again	Finalist
2021	Graphic Novels, Comics, and Illustrated Books	Tasha Spillett, with Natasha Donovan (illus.)	From the Roots Up: Surviving the City Vol. 2	Finalist
2021	Indigenous Language	Zacharias Kunuk with Megan Kyak-Monteith (illus.)	The Shaman's Apprentice: Inuktitut	Winner
2021	Unpublished Poetry in English	Samantha Martin-Bird	the indian (adultery) act & other poems	Winner
2021	Unpublished Poetry in English	Brandi Bird	Ode to Diabetes	Finalist
2021	Unpublished Poetry in English	Erica Violet Lee	A Manifesto for the Morning and Forever After	Finalist
2021	Unpublished Poetry in English	Shaya MacDonald	She Said to Me	Finalist
2021	Unpublished Prose in English	Amanda Peters	Waiting for the Long Night Moon	Winner
2021	Unpublished Prose in English	Troy Sebastian	The Mission	Finalist
2021	Unpublished Prose in English	Deanna M. Jacobson	Hockey and Hot Chocolate	Finalist
2022	English Prose	Brian Thomas Isaac	All the Quiet Places	Winner
2022	English Prose	Sheryl Doherty	Finding Izzy	Finalist
2022	English Poetry	Selina Boan	Undoing Hours	Winner
2022	English Poetry	Tenille K. Campbell	nedí nezų	Finalist
2022	English Poetry	Dallas Hunt	Creeland	Finalist
2022	English Poetry	Diana Hope Tegenkamp	Girl running	Finalist
2022	French Language	Édouard Itual Germain	Ni kistisin / Je me souviens	Winner
2022	French Language	Andrée Levesque Sioui	Chant(s)	Finalist
2022	French Language	Daniel Sioui	Indien stoïque	Finalist
2022	Graphic Novels, Comics, and Illustrated Books	Aimée Craft	Treaty Words: For As Long As the Rivers Flow	Winner
2022	Graphic Novels, Comics, and Illustrated Books	Lisa Boivin	We Dream Medicine Dreams	Finalist
2022	Graphic Novels, Comics, and Illustrated Books	Teoni Spathelfer with Natassia Davies (illus.)	White Raven	Finalist
2022	Indigenous Language	Brittany Luby with Joshua Mangeshig Pawis-Steckley (illus.) and Alvin Ted Corbiere (trans.) and Alan Corbiere (trans.)	Mii maanda ezhi-gkendmaanh / This Is How I Know	Winner
2022	Indigenous Language	Jodie Callaghan, with Georgia Lesley (illus.) and Joe Wilmot (trans.)	Ga’s / The Train	Finalist
2022	Indigenous Language	Sharon King	Amik	Finalist
2022	Unpublished Prose in English	Leslie Butt	Tanked	Winner
2022	Unpublished Prose in English	David Agecoutay	It's For the Best	Finalist
2022	Unpublished Prose in English	Jenn Ashton	Hail Mary, Mother of Pearl	Finalist
2022	Unpublished Prose in English	Bianca Martin	Paqt’sm / I Was Born with the Spirit of the Wolf	Finalist
2022	Unpublished Poetry in English	Meghan Eaker	mistahi maskikiy	Winner
2022	Unpublished Poetry in English	Brandi Bird	A Dawn	Finalist
2022	Unpublished Poetry in English	Jacqueline Gibbon	tante ohci kiya / Displaced Métis Iskwew	Finalist
2022	Unpublished Poetry in English	Samantha Martin-Bird	Poems for White Men	Finalist
2023	English Prose	Cody Caetano	Half-Bads in White Regalia	Winner
2023	English Prose	Francine Cunningham	God Isn't Here Today	Finalist
2023	English Prose	Frances Koncan	Women of the Fur Trade	Finalist
2023	English Prose	Kim Spencer	Weird Rules to Follow	Finalist
2023	English Prose	Chelsea Vowel	Buffalo Is the New Buffalo	Finalist
2023	English Prose	Joshua Whitehead	Making Love with the Land	Finalist
2023	French Prose	Carole Labarre	L'Or des mélèzes	Winner
2023	French Prose	J. D. Kurtness	Bienvenue	Finalist
2023	French Prose	Jocelyn Sioui	Frétillant et agile	Finalist
2023	English Poetry	Emily Riddle	The Big Melt	Winners
2023	English Poetry	Matthew James Weigel	Whitemud Walking	Winners
2023	English Poetry	Justene Dion-Glowa	Trailer Park Shakes	Finalist
2023	English Poetry	Ashley Qilavaq-Savard	Where the Sea Kuniks the Land	Finalist
2023	English Poetry	Délani Valin	Shapeshifters	Finalist
2023	French Poetry	Maya Cousineau Mollen	Enfants du lichen	Winner
2023	French Poetry	Rita Mestokosho	Atik u utei	Finalist
2023	Indigenous Language	Solomon Awa	Animals Illustrated: Narwhal	Winner
2023	Indigenous Language	George Paul, Loretta Gould, Barbara Sylliboy	The Honour Song	Finalist
2023	Unpublished prose in English	David Agecoutay	"Frank"	Winner
2023	Unpublished prose in English	Brandi Bird	"Home"	Finalist
2023	Unpublished prose in English	Kerissa Dickie	"Seh Woo – My Teeth"	Finalist
2023	Unpublished prose in English	Henry Heavyshield	"Settler Birds and Social NDNs in the City"	Finalist
2023	Unpublished prose in English	Scarlet Scott	"In the Morning"	Finalist
2023	Unpublished poetry in English	Cooper Skjeie	"Scattered Oblations"	Winner
2023	Unpublished poetry in English	Leah Baptiste	"Rez Girls Are Forever"	Finalist
2023	Unpublished poetry in English	Kelsey Borgford	"Once the Smudge Is Lit"	Finalist
2023	Unpublished poetry in English	Kaitlyn Purcell	"A Child Called Dream"	Finalist
2023	Graphic novels	Samantha Beynon, Lucy Trimble	Oolichan Moon	Winner
2023	Graphic novels	Raeann Brown	Bedtime in Nunatsiavut	Finalist
2023	Graphic novels	Babah Kalluk	Niitu and Chips	Finalist
2023	Graphic novels	Cole Pauls	Kwändǖr	Finalist
2023	Graphic novels	Willie Poll with Chief Lady Bird	Together We Drum, Our Hearts Beat as One	Finalist
2024	English Prose	Alicia Elliott	And Then She Fell	Winner
2024	English Prose	Caleigh Crow	There is Violence and There is Righteous Violence and There is Death or, The Born-Again Crow	Finalist
2024	English Prose	Michelle Good	Truth Telling	Finalist
2024	English Prose	Peggy Janicki	The Secret Pocket	Finalist
2024	English Prose	Tiffany Morris	Green Fuse Burning	Finalist
2024	English Prose	Angela Sterritt	Unbroken	Finalist
2024	English Poetry	Brandi Bird	The All + Flesh	Winner
2024	English Poetry	Jesse Rae Archibald-Barber	The Star Poems	Finalist
2024	English Poetry	Jamesie Fournier	Elements	Finalist
2024	English Poetry	Cara-Lyn Morgan	Building a Nest from the Bones of My People	Finalist
2024	French Prose	J. D. Kurtness	La vallée de l’étrange	Winner
2024	French Prose	Georges Pisimopeo	Piisim Napeu	Winner
2024	French Prose	Moira-Uashteskun Bacon	Envole-toi, Mikun	Finalist
2024	French Poetry/Drama	Soleil Launière	Akuteu	Winner
2024	French Poetry/Drama	Alexis Vollant	Nipinapunan	Winner
2024	French Poetry/Drama	Émilie Monnet	Marguerite, le feu	Finalist
2024	Unpublished Prose	Dennis Allen	Kristopher with a K	Winner
2024	Unpublished Prose	Jenn Ashton	Hungry	Winner
2024	Unpublished Prose	Henry Heavyshield	Our Rez Anomaly	Winner
2024	Unpublished Prose	Kaitlyn Purcell	łuk'é náte	Winner
2024	Unpublished Poetry	Leah Baptiste	Coming of Age	Winner
2024	Unpublished Poetry	Hannah Big Canoe	Nanabush Trails and Four Others	Winner
2024	Unpublished Poetry	sakâw laboucan	styrofoam love	Winner
2024	Unpublished Poetry	Jordan Redekop-Jones	On the Threshold, I Taste Lightning	Winner
2025	English Prose	Wayne K. Spear, Georges Erasmus	Hòt’a! Enough!: Georges Erasmus's Fifty-Year Battle for Indigenous Rights	Finalist
2025	English Prose	Jennifer Leason	Hummingbird/Aamo-binashee	Finalist
2025	English Prose	Trina Rathgeber	Lost at Windy River: A True Story of Survival	Finalist
2025	English Prose	Joelle Peters	Niizh	Finalist
2025	English Prose	Tanya Talaga	The Knowing	Finalist
2025	English Poetry	Kenzie Allen	Cloud Missives	Finalist
2025	English Poetry	Kelsey Borgford	Once the Smudge Is Lit	Finalist
2025	English Poetry	Aedan Corey	KINAUVUNGA?/ᑭᓇᐅᕗᖓ	Finalist
2025	English Poetry	Rosanna Deerchild	She Falls Again	Finalist
2025	English Poetry	E. McGregor	What Fills Your House Like Smoke	Finalist
2025	French Prose	TBA		
2025	French Poetry/Drama	TBA		
2025	Unpublished Prose	Jesset Karlen	Archive of Forever	Winner
2025	Unpublished Prose	Kieran Rice	Intertribal	Winner
2025	Unpublished Prose	Chantal Rondeau	White Ash Falling	Winner
2025	Unpublished Prose	Nolan Schmerk	Life Is Water	Winner
2025	Unpublished Prose	Jennifer B.S. Williams	Selected Stories from ‘K’wootxw’	Winner
2025	Unpublished Poetry	Henry Heavyshield	houses made of pollen & other poems	Winner
2025	Unpublished Poetry	aleria mckay	Homecoming	Winner
2025	Unpublished Poetry	Dawn Amber Tonks	And Then	Winner
2025	Unpublished Poetry	Kevin Wesaquate	Shapeshifter	Winner

== See also ==
- Burt Award for First Nations, Inuit and Métis Literature
- PMC Indigenous Literature Awards
- McNally Robinson Aboriginal Book of the Year Award
