= Split Tooth =

2018 novel by Canadian musician Tanya Tagaq

- First edition cover
- Author: Tanya Tagaq
- Language: English
- Genre: Magic realism
- Publisher: Viking Press
- Publication date: September 25, 2018
- Publication place: Canada
- Media type: Print (Hardcover), audiobook
- ISBN: 9780143198055
- OCLC: 1076787054

Split Tooth is a 2018 novel by Canadian musician Tanya Tagaq. Based in part on her own personal journals, the book tells the story of a young Inuk woman growing up in the Canadian Arctic in the 1970s.

The book has been described as a blend of fiction, memoir, poetry and Inuit folklore. Characterized by the publisher as magic realism, it has also been seen as an example of Daniel Heath Justice's critical concept of "wonderworks" or literature by Indigenous North American writers that defies conventional Western notions of literary genres.

The book won the Indigenous Voices Award for English Prose in 2019. The novel was also longlisted for the 2018 Giller Prize, and was shortlisted for the 2019 Amazon.ca First Novel Award.

== Background ==
Split Tooth was written by Tanya Tagaq based on journal entries, poems, and short stories that she had written over the previous 20 years. Tagaq was raised in Cambridge Bay, Nunavut, and attended high school in Yellowknife before finding success in Toronto performing Inuit throat singing. At 43 years old in 2018 when Split Tooth, Tagaq's first and only book was published, she had already released four studio albums and was appointed to be a Member of the Order of Canada.

== Summary ==
Through a series of alternating short prose, poems and illustrations, the Inuk narrator recollects aspects of growing up in the Nunavut tundra in the 1970s. The unnamed adolescent girl protagonist lives in a small seaside town where rape, addiction, domestic violence, and bullying are almost everyday dangers. Through her relationship with her younger sister she begins to connect spiritually to the land, eventually learning soul projection to meet with a variety of mythic and incorporeal forces. While projecting on the sea ice in an attempt to find Sedna, she instead encounters a deific set of Northern lights, who impregnate her with twins named Savik and Naja. As infants, Naja acts as a healer strengthening the life energy of those around her, while Savik instead begins to predate on people's sicknesses and immorality, killing the protagonist's alcoholic uncle and threatening her other loved ones. She attempts to kill Savik on the ice, but he shapeshifts to resist and the exertion of life energy instead drains and kills Naja. She releases Naja's body to the water, where she revives for the twins to merge into a seal and swim off. The protagonist surrenders to the elements, but instead projects through her own memories to speak with the spirits of her relatives before returning to the land of the living.

== Style and themes ==
The book is divided by unnumbered chapters with poems and illustrations in between pieces of short prose. The prose is written with a poetic quality and moves the narratives along. The poems include one written in Inuinnaqtun, a dialect of an Inuit language. The illustrations are all full-page, black-and-white drawings by Chicano artist Jaime Hernandez. The book integrates some of the author's real life background and experiences, fiction and Inuit Qaujimajatuqangit. For example, the story of Sedna is related as a counterpoint to the 1970s Panarctic Oils seismic testing. The publisher categorizes the genre as magical realism, as the author noted Gabriel García Márquez as being an influence, though it also fits within the genre of Bildungsroman. The book has been cited as an example of the genre "wonderwork" as described by literary academic Daniel Heath Justice, being Indigenous literature that defies conventional Western notions of literary genre.

Among the themes is that of interconnectedness: "life and death, tenderness and violence, everyday existence and the spectacular spirituality inherent in nature are one and the same". The setting cycles through alternating the "24-hour day and perpetual night" of the high arctic. Like her last album, Retribution, the theme of rape is prevalent throughout the work: "the rape of women, of children, of traditional lands, the shame brought on Indigenous people by these assaults, by the residential school system...lost languages, grinding poverty, generational trauma."

== Publication and reception ==
Split Tooth was published by Penguin Books imprint Viking Press and released on September 25, 2018. An excerpt was published in The Walrus and it charted for several weeks on The Globe and Mail's Canadian fiction bestseller list. It was awarded an Indigenous Voices Award, longlisted for the 2018 Giller Prize, the 2019 Sunburst Award and nominated for the Amazon.ca First Novel Award while the author was shortlisted for the Kobo Emerging Writer Prize and the book designer Jennifer Griffiths was given to the Alcuin Society Award for Excellence in Book Design in Canada. At the same time, an audiobook version voiced by Tagaq was released and nominated for an Audie Award| and a version translated into French by Sophie Voillot was published by Alto, titled Croc Fendu, and longlisted for the Prix des libraires du Québec.

The review in the Quill & Quire stated "Like a smirking teenager, Split Tooth blithely gives typical literary expectations the finger, daring us to see and experience narrative as chaotic, emotional, and deeply instinctive. And it succeeds." The review in the Winnipeg Free Press concluded that the book's "triumph" is describing a real life that "overflows with the supernatural, the unexplained, the unknown". In La Presse, the reviewer wrote "Tanya, she likes the right words, the precise, the poetic." Another reviewer stated "This is definitely a work to admire for how the author has told the story and what it has to offer, rather than one to enjoy." Quill & Quire editor, Sue Carter, writing in the Toronto Star, noted that Split Tooth, along with Cherie Dimaline's The Marrow Thieves also released in 2018, shows that there is now "a broad demand for Indigenous-authored books."

== See also ==
- Soul wandering
