= Tenille =

Tenille is a given name. Notable people with the name include:

- Tenille Arts (born 1994), Canadian singer
- Tenille Campbell, Canadian poet and photographer
- Tenille Averil Dashwood (born 1989), Australian professional wrestler
- Tenille Swartz (born 1987), South African professional squash player
- Tenille Townes (born 1994), Canadian singer
- Tenille Peterson, daughter of mall saleswoman Tanya Peterson of Freeform's 2021 miniseries Cruel Summer

== See also ==
- Toni Tennille (born 1940), American musician
