= Warren Cariou =

Canadian writer and academic

Warren Cariou FRSC
- Born: 1966 (age 59–60); Meadow Lake, Saskatchewan, Canada
- Spouse: Alison Calder
- Awards: Drainie-Taylor Biography Prize

Academic background
- Education: University of Saskatchewan (BA); University of Toronto (MA, PhD)

Academic work
- Discipline: English literature
- Institutions: University of Manitoba

Warren Cariou FRSC is a Canadian writer and academic of Métis and European heritage. His work centres the search for relationality, oral tradition, and environmental concerns in Canada, which he shows through his entire creative output of photography, books, films, and academic work. Although he is originally from Meadow Lake, Saskatchewan, and has ties to the area, he currently resides in Winnipeg with his wife, Alison Calder, who is a poet and professor.

== Biography ==
Cariou was born in 1966 and grew up in Meadow Lake, Saskatchewan. His mother has European heritage while his father, Ray Cariou, was a known Métis storyteller. Warren received a B.A. (Hons) from the University of Saskatchewan and an MA and PhD from the University of Toronto (1998). He currently teaches Indigenous Literatures at the University of Manitoba (with special attention to Métis voices that echo his heritage). He is also on the Steering Committee for the University of Manitoba's Centre for Creative Writing and Oral Culture.

Writings: In 1999, he published a book of short stories, The Exalted Company of Roadside Martyrs, with Coteau Books. This was followed up in 2002 with his memoir Lake of the Prairies, which gained him a wider audience. It won the 2002 Drainie-Taylor Biography Prize and was shortlisted for the 2004 Charles Taylor Prize. In 2005 Cariou served on the jury for the prestigious Scotiabank Giller Prize.Cariou was one of three featured authors in Coming Attractions '95, and has had short stories appear in Stag Line: Stories by Men and Due West, both published by Coteau Books. As well, his fiction was awarded a CBC Literary Competition Prize in 1991. He has also published academic writings, such as his popular 2020 essay "On Critical Humility," which tells of the importance of humility within both Indigenous worldviews and academic spaces. He also has a series with the University of Manitoba Press called First Voices, First Texts, which "aims to re-connect contemporary readers with some of the most important Indigenous literature of the past, much of which has been unavailable for decades" (par. 1).

Other artistic work: Beyond writing, Cariou is known for his films and photography, which capture the lives of Indigenous populations near the Athabasca tar sands. He calls this form of photography "petrography" because it is created by having sunlight hit petroleum bitumen from the tar sands (see specifics below). Photography also plays a major role in Lake of the Prairies, which features found photography of his family and home to contextualize the story.

Other work: In addition to his literary writings and academic work, Cariou has worked as a construction labourer, a technical writer and a political advisor.

== Honours ==
- 2002 Drainie-Taylor Biography Prize
- 2005 Greifswald Canadian Studies Fellow in Residence, University of Greifswald, Germany

== Works ==
- with W'Daub Awae, Kateri Akiwenzie-Damm, Daniel Heath Justice, Lesley Belleau: Speaking True: A Kegedonce Press Anthology. Kegedonce, 2006 ISBN 0978499859Book

=== Books ===
- Exalted Company of Roadside Martyrs.
- Lake of the Prairies: A Story of Belonging. This book won the Drainie-Taylor Prize, was chosen as Globe and Mail's Notable Book of the Year, and was shortlisted for the Charles Taylor Prize for Literary Non-Fiction.
  - Prairies tells the story of growing up in Saskatchewan, living with the land, and searching for belonging. It revolves around the central questions of "where does one belong?" and "where is one's home?" Told in vivid prose, the text is a masterful reflection on prairie life and belonging.

=== Films ===
- Documentary: Overburden by Neil McArthur and Warren Cariou. Released 2009-01-03.
- Documentary: Land of Oil and Water by Neil McArthur and Warren Cariou. 2009-01-01.

=== Photography (Petrography) ===
- In 2013 Cariou wrote and created documentaries Overburdened and Land of Oil and Water with Neil McArthur about the highly destructive production of tar sands impacting the Indigenous communities of Saskatchewan and Alberta. Cariou then decided to begin using the toxic material to create photographs he has named petrography.
- He began experimenting with the new medium with assistance from Dr. Dusan Stulik, a senior research scientist at the Getty Conservation Institute.
- Cariou uses a specific medium of petroleum and sunlight in his photography “Petrography is literally petroleum-photography: the creation of images through the interaction of sunlight and the heavy petroleum product known as bitumen, which is the main source of the vast supplies of oil in Canada’s Athabasca tar sands region”.
