= Shannon Masters =

Canadian screenwriter

- Citizenship: Canadian
- Occupation: screenwriter
- Years active: 2010s-present
- Notable work: Empire of Dirt

Shannon Masters is a Canadian screenwriter. She is best known for the film Empire of Dirt, for which she won the Canadian Screen Award for Best Original Screenplay at the 2nd Canadian Screen Awards in 2014.

Masters is a graduate of the Canadian Film Centre's screenwriting program.

In 2021 she was announced as the writer and showrunner for a television adaptation of Michelle Good's award-winning novel Five Little Indians.

== Personal life ==
Masters is of Cree Metis and Ukrainian descent, and is a member of the Métis Nation of Ontario.
