= Smokii Sumac =

Ktunaxa and transmasculine poet

Smokii Sumac is a Ktunaxa and transmasculine poet whose first book of poetry, you are enough: love poems for the end of the world was published in 2018 by Kegedonce Press. The unpublished draft manuscript of the book, then titled "#haikuaday", won the inaugural Indigenous Voices Award for Unpublished English Poetry, while the book itself was awarded the 2019 Indigenous Voices Award for English Poetry.

== Early life and education ==
Sumac grew up in Invermere, British Columbia. He attended the David Thompson Secondary School. He has talked openly about his recovery from alcoholism and addiction. He credits the Canadian Festival of Spoken Word in 2017 with inspiring him to begin writing poetry.

Formerly, he was a PhD Candidate in Indigenous Studies at Trent University, where he researched "coming home" stories from a Ktunaxa adoptee and two-spirit perspective.

== Literary career ==
His work has been published in Write Magazine, Electric City Magazine and Canadian Literature.

you are enough has been favorably reviewed in publications including Muskrat Magazine and Transmotion. He has performed at various events and venues including the Queer Arts Festival in 2018 and PoetryNOW: 11th Annual Battle of the Bards in 2019. In 2020 Sumac was named as a finalist for the Dayne Ogilvie Prize for emerging LGBTQ writers.

Sumac's poetry is noted for its frankness about matters of sex and grief. Literary critic James Mackay discusses Sumac's work as a product of social media, comparing it to Instapoetry, arguing that "the hashtags in Sumac's work serve to restructure the poems away from being singular units and into becoming fluid and interlinked units of a larger discussion."

== Personal life ==
In addition to writing, Sumac dedicates much of his work to Indigenous and LGBTQ communities. He currently serves as Interim Senior Manager for Education and Employment with the Ktunaxa Nation.

Sumac identifies as two-spirit, trans masculine, "as an uncle and an auntie". He currently lives in both Peterborough, Ontario and Ithaca, New York with his family and their dog.

== Publications ==
=== Poetry collections ===
- you are enough: love poems for the end of the world. Kegedonce, 2018.
- Born Sacred: Poems for Palestine. Foreword by Zaynab Mohammed. Fernwood Publishing, 2025.

=== Poems and essays ===
- "there are hierarchies of grief". 2016 Canadian Literature.
- "All My Relations": Aunties, Cousins, and Indigenous Methods of Recognition. 2017 Write Magazine.
- "No Pipelines on Stolen Native Land". 2017 Electric City Magazine.
- "Two Spirit and Queer Indigenous Resurgence through Sci-Fi Futurisms, Doubleweaving, and Historical Re-Imaginings: A Review Essay". published on July 31, 2018, for Kent University.
- "Just Make Me Look Like Aquaman". Tea and Bannock, 2020.
