= Sheena Kamal =

Canadian novelist

- Born: Trinidad
- Education: University of Toronto
- Occupation: Novelist
- Writing career
- Years active: 2010s–present
- Genres: Thriller, young adult fiction
- Notable work: The Lost Ones (2017)
- Notable awards: Macavity Award for best first novel, 2018
- Website: www.sheenakamal.com

Sheena Kamal is a Canadian novelist. Her works include thrillers and young adult fiction.

== Early life and education ==
Kamal moved to Canada from Trinidad at age 6. She received a degree in political science from the University of Toronto and worked in the film industry before beginning a career as a novelist.

== Writing ==
=== Nora Watts series ===
As of September 2020, Kamal has published three novels that center on Nora Watts: The Lost Ones (2017), It All Falls Down (2018), and No Going Back (2020). Watts, a crime investigator, is half-Indigenous and half-Palestinian and lives in Vancouver's Downtown Eastside.

The Lost Ones (2017) is a thriller set in Vancouver. Kamal developed the concept for the novel while working as a staffer on Shoot the Messenger.

Roxane Gay praised The Lost Ones on her Goodreads account and Jael Richardson selected it as a recommended title on CBC Radio's q books program. The novel won 2018's Macavity Award for best first novel and the Kobo Emerging Writer Prize for Mystery.

=== Fight Like a Girl ===
Kamal's first book for young readers is Fight Like a Girl (2020). The novel centers on Trisha, a teenager who practices Muay Thai, whose father dies in a car accident. Novelist Jennifer Hillier recommended the work in Ms., noting that "I would buy this book based on the title alone".

== Personal life ==
Like the main character of Fight Like a Girl, Kamal practises Muay Thai.

== Works ==
- Kamal, Sheena (2017). The Lost Ones. HarperCollins. ISBN 978-0-06-256576-1. OCLC 995161969.
- Kamal, Sheena (2018). It All Falls Down. HarperCollins. ISBN 978-0-06-256577-8. OCLC 1041940269.
- Kamal, Sheena (2020). No Going Back. HarperCollins. ISBN 978-0-06-286978-4. OCLC 1150884557.
- Kamal, Sheena (2020). Fight Like a Girl. Penguin Books. ISBN 978-0-7352-6556-1. OCLC 1107700313.
