= Brandi Bird =

Canadian poet

Brandi Bird is a Saulteaux, Cree and Métis poet from Canada, most noted for their 2023 collection The All + Flesh. The book was the winner of the 2024 Indigenous Voices Award for English poetry, and was shortlisted for the Gerald Lampert Award and the Raymond Souster Award by the League of Canadian Poets, and the Governor General's Award for English-language poetry at the 2024 Governor General's Awards.

The All + Flesh was Bird's first full-length book, although they have previously published chapbooks and had work released in literary magazines. They received several prior Indigenous Voices nominations for both published and unpublished poetry, including for Two Poems in 2018, I Am Still Too Much in 2020, Ode to Diabetes in 2021, and A Dawn in 2022.

Originally from Treaty 1 territory in Manitoba, Bird is currently a student at the University of British Columbia. They identify as indigiqueer.
