= Eternity Martis =

Canadian journalist and author

- Born: 1993 (age 32–33)
- Education: University of Western Ontario; Ryerson University
- Writing career
- Notable awards: Kobo Emerging Writer Prize (2021)
- Website: www.eternitymartis.com

Eternity Martis is a Canadian journalist and author from Toronto, Ontario. Her debut publication They Said This Would Be Fun: Race, Campus Life, and Growing up won the 2021 Kobo Emerging Writer Prize for non-fiction.

== Early life and education ==
Martis was born in 1993. Growing up she enjoyed reading and writing, and in high school she worked at the school newspaper. Martis went to the University of Western Ontario where she earned a double honours Bachelor of Arts (English Language and Literature and Women's Studies and Feminist Research) and a Certificate in writing. She went on to study at Ryerson University where she completed a graduate degree in Journalism. Martis identifies as a Black woman with mixed heritage; her father is Jamaican and her mother is of Pakistani origin.

== Career ==
Martis was a senior editor at Xtra Magazine. Her writing focuses on issues surrounding gender and race. In March 2020 she published her debut memoir, They Said This Would Be Fun: Race, Campus Life, and Growing up with McLelland and Stewart. The book documents her experiences with racism, drawing on her time as a student at the University of Western Ontario. In 2021 the book was awarded the Kobo Emerging Writer Prize for nonfiction. The title was selected by non-fiction judge Kamal Al-Solaylee.

In addition to writing and publishing, Martis teaches journalism and has held various positions at Ryerson University in the School of Journalism. She was the 2021 Asper Visiting Professor and Journalist-in-Residence at the School of Journalism, Writing, and Media at the University of British Columbia. Martis was the Simon Fraser University Library's 2022 Non-Fiction Writer in Residence, holding the post from January to April 2022. In January 2022, it was announced that she would be joining the School of Journalism at Ryerson University in a tenure-track position beginning in July 2022.

== Awards ==
- 2021 Rakuten Kobo Emerging Writer Prize
- 2020 Winner (editor) of Best Newsletter Digital Publishing Awards
- 2019 Winner of Best Investigative Feature at Canadian Publishing Awards

== Bibliography ==
- They said This Would Be Fun: Race, Campus Life, and Growing up (2021), McLelland and Stewart ISBN 9780771062209
