= Teva Harrison =

Canadian-American writer and graphic artist (1976–2019)

Teva Harrison (August 20, 1976, Williams, Oregon, U.S. – April 28, 2019, Toronto, Ontario, Canada) was a Canadian-American writer and graphic artist. She was diagnosed with metastatic breast cancer at age 37, and began to document her experiences with the terminal illness using illustrations and essays. Her works were compiled into a graphic memoir called In-Between Days. The book was a finalist for the 2016 Governor General's Award for English-language non-fiction, and put Harrison on the list of 16 Torontonians to Watch. Harrison won the 2016 Kobo Emerging Writer Prize, and was a finalist for the 2017 Joe Shuster Award for Cartoonist/Auteur.

She also published The Joyful Living Colouring Book in 2016, and a posthumous collection of poetry of drawings, Not One of These Poems is About You was published in January 2020.

She wrote for The Walrus, Granta, and HuffPost, and was featured in the Globe and Mail, Creative Mornings, HuffPost Canada, Kirkus Reviews, The New York Times, and WNYC. She also spoke on CBC Radio about her experience. She became a respected voice on issues around metastatic breast cancer, opioids, and the power of nature.

Harrison's art was featured in a solo exhibition at the Winnipeg Art Gallery in 2017, and she was the lead illustrator of Draw Me Close, a virtual-reality theatre production, created by Jordan Tannahill and co-produced by the National Theatre and the National Film Board. Sections of Draw Me Close were featured at the 2017 Tribeca Film Festival and the 74th Venice Film Festival. Draw Me Close was to have its North American premiere with Toronto's Soulpepper in 2020.

== Death ==
Harrison died in Toronto from metastatic breast cancer, aged 42, some six years after her diagnosis. Survivors included her husband, David Leonard.
