= Bevann Fox =

Canadian writer

Bevann Fox is a writer, from Canada, of Genocidal Love: A Life after Residential School, the winner in the English Non-fiction category at the 2021 Indigenous Voices Awards, and winner, Creative Saskatchewan Publishing Award 2021.

== Early life and education ==
In 2012, Fox received her Bachelor of Arts in Arts and Culture. In 2018, Fox received her Master in Business Administration, Leadership from the University of Regina.

== Career ==
Fox is the co-host of AccessNow TV′s The Four. Fox works as Manager for Community-Based Prevention at Yellow Thunderbird Lodge (Yorkton Tribal Council Child Family Services).

== Recognition ==
In 2014, Fox received the YWCA Women of Distinction Award—Arts, Culture and Heritage. Genocidal Love got seven nominations, with two wins.

== Personal life ==
Bevann Fox, born in 1968, was originally a Piapot First Nation member, now a Pasqua First Nation member. Fox lives in Regina, Saskatchewan.

== Works ==
- Genocidal Love: A Life after Residential School. Regina, Saskatchewan: University of Regina Press. 2020. ISBN 9780889777415.
- Abstract Love. Saskatoon: The author. 2011. ISBN 978-0-9879287-0-2. OCLC 866625675.
