= Erica McKeen =

Canadian author

Erica McKeen is a Canadian author. Her debut novel, Tear, won the 2023 Kobo Emerging Writer Prize for Fiction. Cicada Summer, her second book, was longlisted for the 2025 Carol Shield Prize for Fiction. Her short stories have appeared in The Dalhousie Review and PRISM International.

== Biography ==
McKeen was born in London, Ontario and is currently based in Vancouver.

In 2021, McKeen was a finalist for the Malahat Review Open Season Fiction Award and her work has also been nominated for the Pushcart Prize and the Guernica Prize.

Tear, McKeen's debut novel, was published in September 2022 by Invisible Publishing. It was named one of the best books of 2022 by The Globe and Mail and won the 2023 Kobo Emerging Writer Prize.

Her second novel, Cicada Summer was published in 2024 by W.W. Norton. The novel takes place during the COVID-19 pandemic and follows Husha, who moves in with her grandfather and her lover in a remote cabin, following her mother's suicide.
