= Kobo Emerging Writer Prize =

Canadian literary award

The Kobo Emerging Writer Prize is a Canadian literary award, presented since 2015 by online e-book and audiobook retailer and eReader manufacturer Rakuten Kobo.

Until 2024, awardees received a $10,000 prize, which was increased to $20,000 in 2025. Winners are also provided with support in marketing their books. Three prizes are awarded each year to debut books published in the prior calendar year in literary fiction, non-fiction, and one of 3 genre fiction categories. Each year a different genre is honoured in the genre fiction category, rotating between mystery, romance, and speculative fiction. Since 2023, the genre fiction category has been open to books published since the prize last accepted submissions in that genre.

== Winners ==
Year	Author	Title	Genre	Reference
2015	Claire Battershill	Circus	Literary fiction	
2015	Sam Wiebe	Last of the Independents: Vancouver Noir	Mystery	
2015	Robyn Doolittle	Crazy Town: The Rob Ford Story	Nonfiction	
2016	Irina Kovalyova	Specimen	Literary fiction	
2016	Nicola R. White	Fury’s Kiss	Romance	
2016	Wab Kinew	The Reason You Walk	Nonfiction	
2017	Lynne Kutsukake	The Translation of Love	Literary fiction	
2017	Dee Willson	A Keeper's Truth	Speculative fiction	
2017	Teva Harrison	In-Between Days	Nonfiction	
2018	Omar El Akkad	American War	Literary fiction	
2018	Sheena Kamal	The Lost Ones	Mystery	
2018	Maria Qamar	Trust No Aunty	Nonfiction	
2019	Nora Decter	How Far We Go and How Fast	Fiction	
2019	Julie Evelyn Joyce	Steeped in Love	Romance	
2019	Kate Harris	Lands of Lost Borders	Nonfiction	
2020	Zalika Reid-Benta	Frying Plantain	Fiction	
2020	J. R. McConvey	Different Beasts	Speculative fiction	
2020	Jesse Thistle	From the Ashes	Nonfiction	
2021	Michelle Good	Five Little Indians	Fiction	
2021	Emily Hepditch	The Woman in the Attic	Mystery	
2021	Eternity Martis	They Said This Would Be Fun: Race, Campus Life and Growing Up	Nonfiction	
2022	Pik-Shuen Fung	Ghost Forest	Fiction	
2022	Damhnait Monaghan	New Girl in Little Cove	Romance	
2022	Jesse Wente	Unreconciled: Family, Truth, and Indigenous Resistance	Nonfiction	
2023	Erica McKeen	Tear	Fiction	
2023	K.S. Covert	The Petting Zoos	Speculative Fiction	
2023	Harrison Mooney	Invisible Boy: A Memoir of Self-Discovery	Nonfiction	
2024	Jamaluddin Aram	Nothing Good Happens in Wazirabad on Wednesday	Fiction	
2024	Keziah Weir	The Mythmakers	Mystery	
2024	Jérémie Harris	Quantum Physics Made Me Do It: A Simple Guide to the Fundamental Nature of Everything	Nonfiction	
2025	Scott Alexander Howard	The Other Valley	Fiction	
2025	Leanne Toshiko Simpson	Never Been Better	Romance	
2025	Anh N. Duong	Dear Da-Lê: A Father's Memoir of the Vietnam War and the Iranian Revolution	Nonfiction	
2026	Marc Bendavid	The Sapling	Fiction	
2026	Marcus Kliewer	We Used to Live Here	Speculative Fiction	
2026	Lyse Doucet	A People's History of Afghanistan	Nonfiction	
