= Nora Decter =

Canadian author and university instructor

- Born: Winnipeg
- Occupation: instructor
- Known for: won the 2019 Kobo Emerging Writer Prize for fiction

Nora Decter is an instructor at the University of Winnipeg and an award-winning author. She won the 2019 Kobo Emerging Writer Prize for fiction for her novel How Far We Go and How Fast. The Kobo Prize comes with a $10,000 cash award.

Her bachelor's degree, from York University, is in English and Creative Writing. She has an MFA in Creative Writing and Literature from Stony Brook University.
