= Maya Cousineau Mollen =

Innu poet (born 1975)

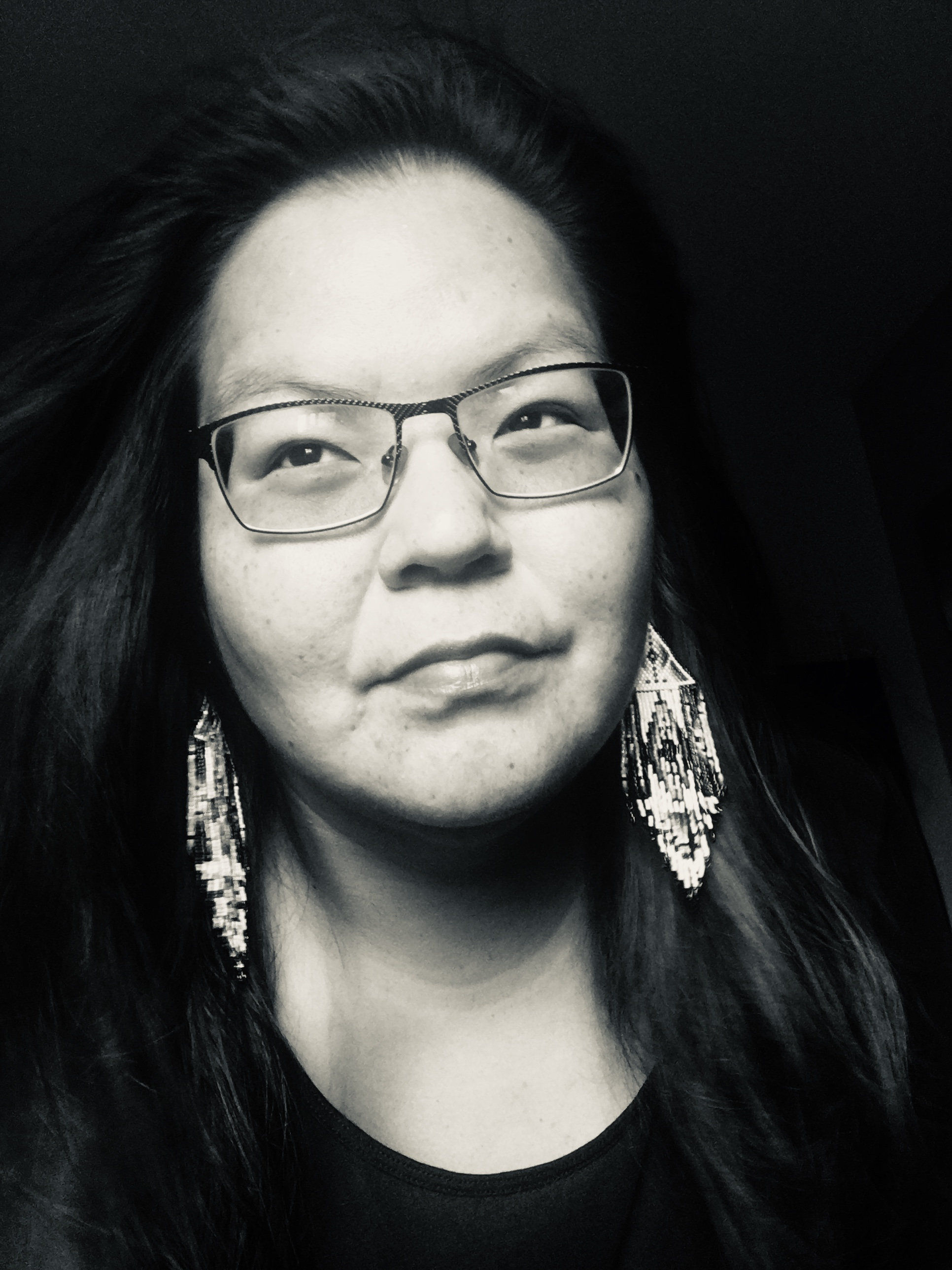
- Born: 1975 (age 50–51); Mingan, Quebec, Canada
- Occupation: poet
- Writing career
- Period: 2010s–present
- Notable work: Bréviaire du matricule 082, Enfants du lichen

Maya Cousineau Mollen (born 1975) is an Innu poet from Mingan, Quebec, Canada. She is most noted for her poetry collection Enfants du lichen, which was the winner of the Governor General's Award for French-language poetry at the 2022 Governor General's Awards.

Her debut poetry collection, Bréviaire du matricule 082, was published in 2019, and was the winner of the Indigenous Voices Award for French-language poetry in 2020.
