= Marie-Andrée Gill =

Canadian poet (born 1986)

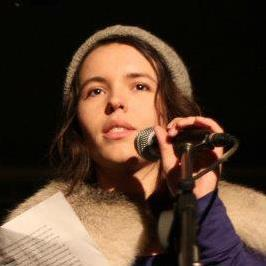
- Gill in May 2013
- Born: 1986 (age 39–40); Mashteuiatsh, Quebec, Canada
- Occupations: Poet, writer

Marie-Andrée Gill (born 1986) is a Canadian poet from the community of Mashteuiatsh, in the Saguenay region, in Quebec, Canada.

== Education ==
Gill is a master's student at the University of Quebec in Chicoutimi. In her work, she explores literary creation and its relationship to oral language and its territoriality.

== Publications ==
Marie-Andrée Gill is the author of multiple poetry collections published by Éditions de La Peuplade. Her poetry combines her Illnue and Québécoise sensibilities and balances ideas of "kitsch and existential."

About Frayer, jury reviewer and poet Louise Dupré wrote: "Marie-Andrée Gill makes a voice of great singularity heard, which questions her genealogy and faces obstacles by seeking Attentive to the contradictions of desire, this book bears witness to an intense presence, in tension between the personal and the collective, realism and dreams, prosaism and poetic invention, fragility and revolt, gentleness and insolence, the past and the future, hope and non-hope. Frayer asks very fair questions about the world we have inherited."

In a review of Spawn, Steven W. Beattie focused on Gill's interest in describing her subjects with the scantest of words. Her directness is understood when she writes about the claustrophobia of life on a reservation—“get me out of these fifteen square kilometres" and the conditions that the colonial system imposed upon her—“I am a village that didn’t have a choice.” The poems follow the life cycle of an ouananiche—a type of salmon—where Gill juxtaposes nature poetry with pop-culture references.

Her work appears in anthologies and magazines such as Estuaire, Le Sabord, Poème Sale, Sirale, Guernica Magazine, and Tupelo Quarterly in both English and French.

== Published collections ==
- Béante (2012)
- Frayer (2015), English translation Spawn (2020) (translated by Kristen Renee Miller)
- Chauffer le dehors (2019), English translation Heating the Outdoors (2023) (translated by Kristen Renee Miller)

== Selected honours ==
- 2012, finalist, Prix du Gouverneur-Général for Béante.
- 2013, Poetry Literary Prize, Saguenay-Lac-Saint-Jean Book Fair for Béante.
- 2015, finalist, Prix Émile-Nelligan for Frayer.
- 2013, Poetry Literary Prize, Saguenay-Lac-Saint-Jean Book Fair for Frayer.
- 2018, Indigenous Voices Award
- 2020, Best Published Poetry in French, Indigenous Voices Awards for Chauffer le dehors.
