= Stella Harvey =

Canadian author (born 1956)

Stella Leventoyannis Harvey (born February 8, 1956) is a Canadian author, as well as the founder and artistic director of the Whistler Writing Society. Under Harvey’s direction, the Whistler Writing Society produces the annual Whistler writers festival, the Authors in the School Program, the Whistler Writer in Residence Program and the Spring Reading Series.

Harvey was born in Cairo, Egypt and immigrated to Calgary, Alberta with her family as a child. She now lives in Whistler, British Columbia. Harvey is of Greek descent through her father and Lebanese and French descent through her mother.

In addition to writing and overseeing the Whistler Writing Society, Harvey mentors students in The Writers’ Studio at Simon Fraser University. Prior to embarking on her writing career, she worked in various senior management roles in both the public and private sector and led or facilitate large organizational change projects. Harvey has a Master's degree in Social Work from the University of Calgary and a certificate in Creative Writing from Simon Fraser University.

== Bibliography ==
=== Novels ===
- Finding Callidora (Signature Editions, 2019)
- The Brink of Freedom (Signature Editions, 2015)
- Nicolai’s Daughters (Signature Editions, 2012), with Psichogios Publications of Athens publishing the Greek translation in 2014.

=== Short stories ===
- “Step 5” (CBC Canada Writes Short Story Contest, 2013)
- “Escape” (The Whistler Question, 2011)
- “Veinakh” (The Dalhousie Review, 2006)
- “La Straniera” (The New Orphic Review, 2005)
- “Seconds” (The Vicious Circle Anthology, 2004)
- “Words” (Emerge Magazine, The Writer’s Studio Anthology, 2004)
- “The End” (The Whistler Question, 2002)
- “Runner Attacked” (Pique Newsmagazine, 2002)
- “Nice Girl” (Pique Newsmagazine, 2002)

=== Non-fiction ===
- “Cousins” (CBC Bloodlines Contest, 2013)
- “After 56 Years of Marriage, My Parents Always Held Hands” (The Globe and Mail, 2011)
- "The Vicious Circle: On the Writing Life” (Pique Newsmagazine, 2003)
- “No Suits for These Cowboys: Lessons Learned by Young Entrepreneurs” (Pique Newsmagazine, 2003)
- “No Suits for These Cowboys: Young Whistler Entrepreneurs Make Their Way” (Pique Newsmagazine, 2002)
- “In Search of Whistler’s Soul” (Pique Newsmagazine, 2002)
- “Bella Umbria” (Pique Newsmagazine, 2002)
- “A Book Review of Navigator of New York” (Pique Newsmagazine, 2002)

=== Awards ===
- Champion of Arts (Whistler, B.C., 2015)
