= Joshua Whitehead =

Two spirit poet and novelist

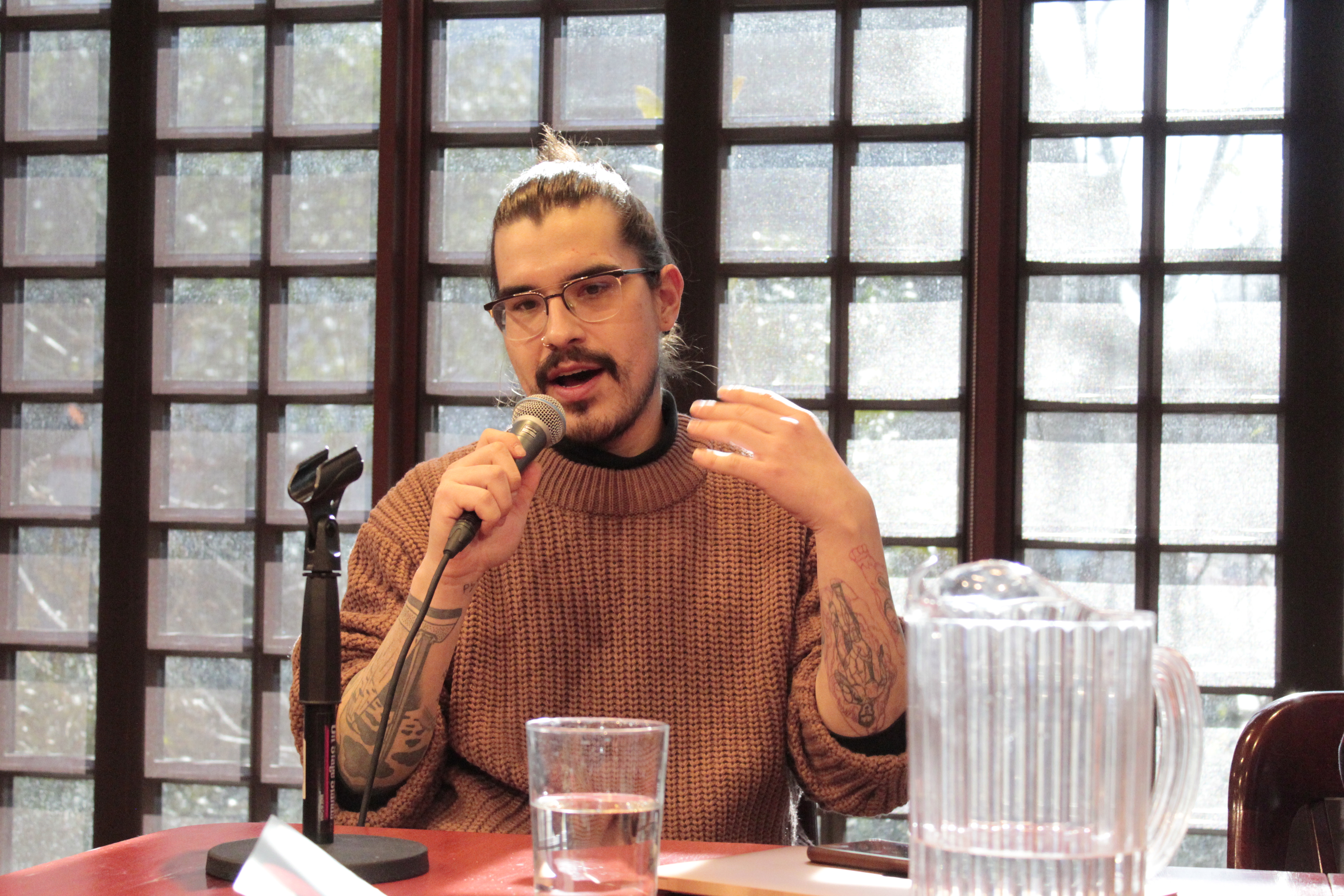
- Education: University of Winnipeg; University of Calgary
- Writing career
- Genres: Poetry; Novels
- Notable work: Jonny Appleseed
- Notable awards: Lambda Literary Award for Gay Fiction; Lambda Literary Award for LGBTQ Anthology

Joshua Whitehead is a First Nations, two-spirit poet, scholar, and novelist.

== Life and education ==
An Oji-Cree member of the Peguis First Nation in Manitoba, he began publishing poetry while pursuing undergraduate studies at the University of Winnipeg.

Whitehead has a Bachelor of Arts in English and Master of Arts in cultural studies from the University of Winnipeg. He received his PhD in English from the University of Calgary in 2021. He is currently an assistant professor of English and international Indigenous studies at the University of Calgary.

== Career ==
After he started graduate studies in Indigenous literature at the University of Calgary, Talonbooks published his debut poetry collection Full-Metal Indigiqueer in 2017. The book initially received a Lambda Literary Award nomination for Transgender Poetry at the 30th Lambda Literary Awards in 2018, but Whitehead withdrew the book from consideration as the category was a misrepresentation of his identity as a two-spirit, not transgender, person.

His debut novel, Jonny Appleseed, was published by Arsenal Pulp Press in 2018. In the same year, he was a finalist for the Dayne Ogilvie Prize for Canadian LGBTQ writers, and the book was longlisted for the 2018 Giller Prize and shortlisted for the Governor General's Award for English-language fiction at the 2018 Governor General's Awards and the 2019 Amazon Canada First Novel Award. The book won the Lambda Literary Award for Gay Fiction at the 31st Lambda Literary Awards. Jonny Appleseed won the 2021 Canada Reads competition, championed by Kawennáhere Devery Jacobs.

Love After the End: An Anthology of Two-Spirit and Indigiqueer Speculative Fiction, an anthology edited by Whitehead, was named the winner of the Lambda Literary Award for LGBTQ Anthology at the 33rd Lambda Literary Awards in 2021. Writers featured in the anthology include Nathan Niigan Noodin Adler, Darcie Little Badger, Gabriel Castilloux Calderon, Adam Garnet Jones, Mari Kurisato, Kai Minosh Pyle, David Alexander Robertson, jaye simpson and Nazbah Tom.

He released an essay collection of creative nonfiction called Making Love With the Land in August 2022.

=== Books ===
- Full-Metal Indigiqueer. Talonbooks. 2017.
- Jonny Appleseed. Arsenal Pulp Press. 2018.
- Making Love with the Land. Knopf. 2022.
- Love After the End: An Anthology of Two-Spirit and Indigiqueer Speculative Fiction. Arsenal Pulp Press. 2022.
- The Stonewailers. Knopf Canada. 2028.
