= Carole Labarre =

Innu writer (born 1966)

Carole Labarre (born 1966) is an Innu writer from Pessamit, Quebec, Canada. She is most noted for her novel L’or des mélèzes, which was a shortlisted Governor General's Award nominee for French-language fiction at the 2023 Governor General's Awards.

Her debut, the novel was published by Éditions Memoire d'encrier in fall 2022. It was the winner of the 2023 Indigenous Voices Award for published prose in French.
