= Kate Harris =

Canadian author (born 1982)

- Born: 1982 (age 43–44); Ontario, Canada
- Occupation: Writer
- Known for: Lands of Lost Borders (2018)
- Website: kateharris.ca

Kate Harris (born in 1982) is a Canadian author.

== Early life ==
Harris was born in Ontario and grew up dreaming of exploring Mars. She viewed the Earth as having been thoroughly explored and charted before her lifetime, so she set her eyes on another planet. This life-long inspiration to explore led her to bike across the Silk Road, which she documented in her first book Lands of Lost Borders.

A graduate of the University of North Carolina, she studied at the University of Oxford as a Rhodes Scholar and then at the Massachusetts Institute of Technology.

== Lands of Lost Borders ==
Her first book, Lands of Lost Borders, a nonfiction book describing her experiences bicycling 10,000 kilometres (6,200 mi) of Asia's historic Silk Road over a 14 month period in 2011, won the 2019 RBC Taylor Prize, the 2019 Kobo Emerging Writer Prize, the 2019 Edna Staebler Award, and 2019 Boardman Tasker Prize for Mountain Literature. The RBC Taylor prize comes with a CA$30,000 cash award. The Kobo Emerging Writers Prize and Edna Staebler Award each come with a CA$10,000 cash award. The book was a Canadian bestseller.

She undertook the trip documented in her book with a friend.

== Current works ==
As of 2019, Harris lives off-grid in northern British Columbia, near the Yukon border.

In an interview with Anna Maria Tremonti of The Current, Harris described falling in love with the land around Atlin, British Columbia, when she skied across the nearby Juneau Icefield as part of an undergraduate field course in glaciology. She currently shares a small cabin there with her partner and their dog.
