= Jaye simpson =

Oji-Cree-Salteaux writer from Canada

jaye simpson (stylized in all lowercase) is an Oji-Cree-Saulteaux indigiqueer writer, poet, activist, and drag queen.

== Personal life ==
simpson resides in Vancouver, British Columbia, on the territories of the Musqueam, Tsleil-Waututh, and Squamish nations. she (Note: simpson uses she/her and they/them pronouns. This article uses she/her for consistency.) writes her name, pronouns, and the word "i" in lowercase letters.

== Career ==
simpson was a finalist for the Dayne Ogilvie Prize for LGBTQ Canadian writers in 2021 for her debut poetry collection it was never going to be okay, published by Nightwood Editions in 2020. The book won the 2021 Indigenous Voices Award for poetry. her work has been published in a variety of magazines, including her piece "all this out of spite" in St@nzas's summer 2021 issue. simpson's story "The Ark of the Turtle's Back" was published in Love After the End, an anthology collection edited by Joshua Whitehead. In 2025, her poetry collection, a body more tolerable, was published.

simpson writes in both English and Swampy Cree. her subjects include indigeneity, queerness, and her experience in the child welfare system.

In 2026 she was nominated for a Lambda Literary Award for Transgender Poetry, and had a small acting role as Sammie in the film Seventeen.
