= Whistler Writers Festival =

Literary arts festival in British Columbia

The Whistler Writers Festival is an annual literary arts festival held every October in Whistler, British Columbia.

Put on by the Whistler Writing Society, the festival brings together the very best Canadian and international authors for a weekend packed with readings, workshops, speaker panels, spoken word events, music and more.

== Background ==
The first festival took place in 2002. It was a grassroots style event held in the living room of founder and current Artistic Director Stella Harvey with one author and 20 participants.

Over the years, the Whistler Writers Festival has steadily grown to become one of the biggest literary arts festivals in British Columbia. It now attracts over 60 authors, publishers and guest presenters, and almost 2,000 attendees every year, with many events completely sold out.

Known for its intimate setting, the Whistler Writers Festival features Q&A sessions during and after readings, round-table masterclass workshops for emerging and experienced writers, face-to-face pitching sessions with publishers and agents and other opportunities to meet and talk with authors. The festival also has a range of unique events such as the Literary Cabaret that matches author readings with live music, Cooks with Books that features chefs with cookbooks paired with food, spoken word events, theatre works and more.

Notable guest authors include Peter Carey, Eden Robinson, Billy-Ray Belcourt, Lisa Moore, Lorna Crozier, Doug Saunders, Frances Itani, Lee Maracle, Jane Urquhart, Emma Donoghue, Madeleine Thien, Lawrence Hill, Grant Lawrence, Joseph Boyden, Michael Winter, Alistair MacLeod, Zsuzsi Gartner, Ivan E. Coyote, Charles Demers, Paulette Bourgeois, Patrick deWitt, Wayne Johnston, Susan Juby, Vincent Lam, Annabel Lyon, Fred Stenson, Miriam Toews and more.

== 2019 Festival ==
The 2019 Whistler Writers Festival will be held from October 17 to 20 at multiple locations throughout Whistler Village, including the Fairmont Chateau Whistler.

Featured authors are Cherie Dimaline, Andrew Pyper, Lorna Crozier, Michael Crummey, Deborah Ellis, Eve Joseph, Richard Van Camp, Jim Brown, Omar El Akkad, Emma Donoghue, Maude Barlow, Shilpi Somaya Gowda, Harold R. Johnson and more.

The event theme is "Discourse", chosen for the festival's commitment to discussion and healthy, provocative and thoughtful debate with as broad and inclusive an audience as possible.

== Whistler Writing Society ==
The Whistler Writing Society, which puts on the festival, is dedicated to promoting the literary arts, providing a forum for local writers to develop their craft within the community, and connecting readers and writers with Canadian literary authors.

In addition to the Whistler Writers Festival, the Whistler Writing Society puts on several other events. These include the Writer in Residence Program, the Authors in the Schools Program and the Spring Reading Series.

The Writer in Residence Program brings published authors to Whistler each fall to work one-on-one and hold group sessions with local writers. Past author participants include Paulette Bourgeois, Candas Jane Dorsey, Merilyn Simonds, Wayne Grady, Brian Brett, Sarah Selecky, Fred Stenson, Ania Szado, Genni Gunn, Michael Winter, Susan Juby, Caroline Adderson, Claudia Casper, Cornelia Hoogland and Cody Caetano.

Each fall, guest authors participate in the Authors in the Schools Program for schools in Squamish, Whistler, Pemberton, Mount Currie and D'Arcy. Guest authors have included Richard Wagamese, Joseph Boyden, Katherena Vermette, Sue Oakey-Baker, Sara Leach, Patti LaBoucane-Benson, Kelly Mellings, Eric Walker, Stella Harvey, Katherine Fawcett, Richard Van Camp, Lisa Moore, Kenneth Oppel, Drew Hayden Taylor, Cary Fagan, Sara Leach, Susin Nielsen, Eden Robinson, Penny Draper, Darren Groth, Simon Groth, Deborah Ellis, Kit Pearson, Richard Van Camp and Cherie Dimaline.

The Spring Reading Series takes place each spring to showcase a group of authors with intimate readings and conversations.
