= Maria Qamar =

Pakistani-Canadian pop artist, born 1991

- Born: 1991 (age 34–35); Karachi, Pakistan
- Occupation: Illustrator
- Known for: Trust No Aunty
- Style: Pop art

Maria Qamar (born 1991), also known as Hatecopy, is a Pakistani-Canadian artist is known for her satirical pop art works that comment on the hybridization of South Asian and Canadian culture. Her work is influenced by sources such as Roy Lichtenstein and Indian soap operas. She is the author of the book Trust No Aunty.

== Early life ==
Maria was born in Karachi, Pakistan, to a father from Bangladesh and a mother from Gujarat, India. Both parents are chemists. She was exposed to both Bengali culture and Gujarati culture growing up.

In 2000, when she was nine, the family emigrated to Ontario, Canada, briefly residing in Scarborough. The family then moved to Mississauga, where she spent the rest of her childhood. She has a brother who became a doctor.

Qamar was interested in art from a young age. She experienced prejudice and bullying against South Asian children in her school, especially in the wake of the September 11 attacks. So as she later recalled, "I started going home and drawing comics about these experiences. But I would change the outcome. In my comics I always got the last laugh." She aligned both with her Desi identity and with Western teen goth, punk rock, and heavy metal subcultures.

== Career ==
She moved to Toronto and took a copywriting job in the advertising industry, a job that started in around 2011. This she did not like; she had hoped that copywriting would have a creative aspect but she disliked needing to get so many people to approve her work. She was laid off around 2015.

Meanwhile, she had taken some art classes at George Brown College. She gained popularity as an artist through her Instagram page where she goes by the name of Hatecopy (the name indicating her feelings for her former field). She began showing her art in unconventional settings, such as bars. As of 2019 she had a following of over 170,000 people on her Instagram platform.

I realized that if you take a still from an Indian soap opera when it's zoomed in on somebody's face and you take a Roy Lichtenstein piece and you put them side by side, it's the exact same expression — but it's coming from two opposite ends of the planet. I decided to merge the two because it kind of described who I was as a person — I'm not one or the other. I don't have to choose.

— Maria Qamar,

Qamar has sold work at exhibitions in Toronto, Los Angeles, New York and London. The Mindy Project creator and actor Mindy Kaling collects Qamar's work and her paintings decorated the set of that show. She had also created murals, signs, and menu and plate designs for restaurants in various North American cities.

Trust No Aunty won the 2018 Kobo Emerging Writer Prize for Nonfiction.

By the 2020s she had also entered the NFT market, as another way to make a living through art.

== Work ==
She is known for her satirical lens commenting on the hybridization of South Asian and Canadian culture. She uses a pop art aesthetic to create works that tackle themes surrounding her experiences of racism, the first generation experience, body shaming, classism, and the patriarchy. Her style is explicitly influenced by the work of Roy Lichtenstein and also by low culture such as Indian soap operas; one of her first works was captioned "what if Lichtenstein parodied Indian soap operas." She does not translate her works for Western audiences, instead leaving South Asian terms and themes in unaltered as she focuses on a Desi audience.

== Exhibitions ==
A 2019 exhibition, entitled "Fraaaandship!", at the Richard Taittinger Gallery in New York brought her additional visibility as the youngest artist at the gallery and the first to come from an Instagram background.

In 2022, she had a solo exhibition at the Museum of Contemporary Art Toronto Canada, entitled Dhamakedar, Superstar!, that concerned a literally starry-eyed young woman who was in love with an unnamed celebrity.
