= Nathan Niigan Noodin Adler =

Canadian writer

- Other name: Nathan Adler
- Citizenship: Canadian, Lac des Mille Lacs First Nation
- Education: Trent University, OCAD University, University of British Columbia
- Occupation: writer
- Known for: horror fiction
- Notable work: Wrist, a story based on the traditional First Nations mythology of the wendigo; short story collection Ghost Lake
- Website: nathanadlerblog.wordpress.com

Nathan Niigan Noodin Adler, sometimes credited as Nathan Adler, is a Canadian writer of horror fiction. He is most noted for his 2020 short story collection Ghost Lake, which was the winner in the English fiction category at the 2021 Indigenous Voices Awards.

Of Jewish and Anishinaabe descent, he is a member of the Lac des Mille Lacs First Nation. He studied English literature and Native studies at Trent University, integrated media at OCAD University, and creative writing at the University of British Columbia.

He published his debut novel Wrist, a story based on the traditional First Nations mythology of the wendigo, in 2016, and he was coeditor with Christine Miskonoodinkwe Smith of the 2019 speculative fiction anthology Bawaajigan: Stories of Power. His short story "Abacus" was included in Joshua Whitehead's Lambda Literary Award-winning anthology Love After the End: An Anthology of Two-Spirit and Indigiqueer Speculative Fiction.

Adler, who identifies as two-spirit, has also done work as a visual artist.
