= Five Little Indians (novel) =

2020 novel by Michelle Good

- First edition
- Author: Michelle Good
- Audio read by: Kyla Garcia
- Language: English
- Subject: Canadian residential schools
- Genre: Historical fiction
- Set in: 1960s Vancouver
- Published: April 14, 2020
- Publisher: HarperCollins
- Publication place: Canada
- Media type: Print (hardcover, paperback), Audio
- Pages: 304
- ISBN: 9781443459198

Five Little Indians is the debut novel by Cree Canadian writer Michelle Good, published in 2020 by Harper Perennial. The novel focuses on five survivors of the Canadian Indian residential school system, struggling to rebuild their lives in Vancouver, British Columbia after the end of their time in the residential schools. It also explores the love and strength that can emerge after trauma.

The book received a number of awards, and was CBC's number one book in 2021. It was selected for and won the 2022 edition of Canada Reads, nominated by Christian Allaire, Ojibwe author and Vogue Fashion Editor.

== Background ==
Although the novel is predominantly fictional, some of its stories were based on real experiences of Good's mother and grandmother, who were survivors of the residential school system. Growing up, her mother talked about the traumatic histories and experiences of attending St. Barnabas Residential School in Onion Lake, Saskatchewan. These discussions influenced Good's work. The novel's development took more than a decade, beginning in 2011 when Good was a fine arts graduate student at the University of British Columbia. As part of the writing process, Good relied on psychological assessments of children who experienced physical and sexual abuse in order to accurately depict these events' long-term impacts on a person's life.

== Reception ==
Five Little Indians was CBC's number one book recommendation in 2021. The book also received positive reviews from the Toronto Star, Vancouver Sun, and Apple Books.

Amnesty International Book Club selected Five Little Indians for their book club in 2021.

Now named Five Little Indians one of the top ten novels of 2020. The Globe and Mail, CBC, Kobo, and Indigo also named the book in their lists of the best books of the year.

The novel was selected for the 2022 edition of Canada Reads, where it was defended by Christian Allaire. It won the competition on March 31.

=== Awards and honors ===
Year	Award		Result	Ref.
2020	Governor General's Awards	English-language fiction	Won	
2020	HarperCollins/UBC Best New Fiction Prize	—	Won	
2020	Rogers Writers' Trust Fiction Prize	—	Shortlisted	
2020	Scotiabank Giller Prize	—	Longlisted	
2021	Amazon.ca First Novel Award	—	Won	
2021	Amnesty International Book Club	Reader's Choice	Selection	
2021	BC and Yukon Book Prize	Ethel Wilson Fiction Prize	Shortlisted	
2021	BC and Yukon Book Prize	Jim Deva Prize for Writing that Provokes	Shortlisted	
2021	City of Vancouver Book Award	—	Won	
2021	Forest of Reading Evergreen Award	—	Won	
2021	Indigenous Voices Award	Published Prose in English: Fiction	Shortlisted	
2021	Kobo Emerging Writer Prize	Fiction	Won	
2022	Canada Reads	Written Book	Won	

== Television adaptation ==
Five Little Indians has been optioned by Prospero Pictures for development as a limited television series. Shannon Masters, a screenwriter of Cree Métis and Ukrainian descent, will serve as writer and show runner alongside Martin Katz and Karen Wookey, who will serve as executive producers.

Good has expressed hopes that the adaptation will make the story accessible to a broader range of people.
