= Jonny Appleseed (novel) =

2018 novel by Joshua Whitehead

- Author: Joshua Whitehead
- Language: English
- Genre: Autobiographical novel wonderworks
- Publisher: Arsenal Pulp Press
- Publication date: 2018
- Publication place: Canada
- Pages: 219

Jonny Appleseed is a 2018 novel by Canadian First Nations author Joshua Whitehead. It is Whitehead's debut novel, and his second published book after the 2017 poetry collection Full-Metal Indigiqueer. Jonny Appleseed follows Jonny, a two-spirit sex worker, as he reckons with his identity and family history. It won the 2018 Lambda Literary Award for Gay Fiction and the 2021 Canada Reads award.

== Summary ==
Jonny Appleseed follows a non-linear structure, with the protagonist narrating several days of his life but frequently turning to describe key memories of his youth. After moving to Winnipeg from his home reserve, Jonny makes a living as a camshow sex worker, catering to his male clients' fantasies as an Indigenous femme bottom. He recalls a series of homoerotic awakenings throughout his childhood as he grew to understand his sexuality, including hooking up with an older counselor at a Christian summer camp named for Johnny Appleseed; the other children ostracized Jonny as "Rottenseed" after the affair was discovered and the counselor fired.

Jonny is particularly close to his mother and his late kokum (grandmother) throughout his life, with the two helping him grow into his feminine identity and occasionally competing for his affection. His kokum introduces Jonny to the concept of two-spirit after he questions his sexuality. Jonny's mother is widowed and remarries a man named Roger, who physically punishes Jonny for his homosexuality, while his kokum dies after Jonny moves to the city. Jonny's closest Indigenous Canadian (NDN or Nate) friend in Winnipeg is Tias, a foster abuse survivor whom he hooks up with frequently despite Tias insisting he isn't gay. Jonny both fears and admires Tias's Indigenous girlfriend, Jordan, as a friend and a romantic rival, with the two silently agreeing to "share" Tias as their desires allow. Jonny makes reports of his dreams, which frequently focus on apocalyptic or highly spiritual themes. His most frequently recurring stress-dream involves him having sex with a maskwa (bear) spirit, connecting to the land through his semen.

In the present day, Jonny finds out Roger has died of cancer and is determined to support his mother at the funeral, set to coincide with his kokum's birthday. Penniless and struggling with substance abuse, Jonny resolves to make 300 dollars in the few days left, redoubling his sex work while relying on Tias for emotional support. He makes the cash the night before the function, however Tias comes in drunk and reveals Jordan is pregnant. Jonny gets a ride from Peggy, another woman from the reserve, on the next day and reconciles with his mother. The community gather to commemorate Roger and Jonny's kokum, with his mother passing around anecdotes of their lives.

== Writing ==
Whitehead constructed the character of Jonny as a reflection of his own most positive attributes while still seeking a two-spirit character capable of feeling pain and insecurity. The 2022 essay collection, Making Love with the Land, discusses many autobiographical details and personal connections he incorporated into the novel. Whitehead described the story as growing out from "beach scenes" between Jonny and Tias, scenes which were originally written as personal recollections for Full-Metal Indigiqueer. Other autobiographical details include Jonny's body image with his weight, as well as his violent and apocalyptic dreams adapted directly from Whitehead's own. Whitehead described imagining himself sleeping with Jonny in order to better embody and understand his character, encountering him in his lucid dreaming for over ten years. Whitehead noted the importance of the maskwa sex scene to both himself and to readers, but criticized the classification of it and Jonny Appleseed's other preternatural events as magic realism, instead identifying the novel with Daniel Heath Justice's concept of wonderworks. Jonny's fantastical experiences form a fundamental part of his everyday spiritual reality, rather than any sort of strict breakage with the novel's literalism. Whitehead worked on the manuscript for the novel for some time, completing it at a cabin in the Rocky Mountains.

== Reception and analysis ==
The novel received praise for its protagonist and narrative, and in particular its decolonial themes of sexuality and community. Jonny's experiences, both waking and dreaming, explore variously positive and negative manifestations of kinship and community. Hardwick and Laboucan write "Jonny Appleseed puts a spotlight on trauma, racism, sexism, and the effects of homophobia on Indigenous bodies, minds, and hearts."

== Awards ==
Whitehead was named a finalist for the 2018 Dayne Ogilvie Prize for Canadian LGBTQ writers, and Jonny Appleseed was named as a longlisted nominee for the Scotiabank Giller Prize and a shortlisted finalist for the Governor General's Award for English-language fiction at the 2018 Governor General's Awards and the 2019 Amazon.ca First Novel Award. The book won the Lambda Literary Award for Gay Fiction at the 31st Lambda Literary Awards, and won the 2021 Canada Reads competition, championed by Kawennáhere Devery Jacobs.
