= Pik-Shuen Fung =

Canadian writer

Pik-Shuen Fung is a Canadian writer, whose debut novel Ghost Forest was the winner of the Amazon.ca First Novel Award in 2022.

Born in Hong Kong and raised in Vancouver, British Columbia, she currently lives in New York City.

Based in part on her own childhood, the novel centers on a Hong Kong immigrant family in Canada, whose family life is marked by the protagonist's father remaining in Hong Kong as an "astronaut father". Published by Strange Light in July 2021, it was named by CBC Books as one of the best Canadian novels of 2021.

Ghost Forest was also the winner of the 2022 Kobo Emerging Writer Prize in the fiction category.
