= Julie Evelyn Joyce =

Canadian author

- Born: 31 January 1983 (age 43); Newcastle, Ontario, Canada
- Occupations: Novelist, physical education teacher
- Writing career
- Years active: 2018–present
- Genre: Romance
- Notable work: Steeped in Love (2018)

Julie Evelyn Joyce (born 31 January 1983) is a Canadian author based in Ottawa, Ontario. Her debut novel, Steeped In Love, won the 2019 Kobo Emerging Writer Prize in the romance genre. In August, 2019, Steeped in Love was the Together We Read: Canada digital book club selection.

Joyce's first written works were pieces of Gilmore Girls fan fiction, which helped her to hone her skills in the craft. Prior to becoming a novelist, she wrote short stories under a pen name with a small press. Through the encouragement of her mother, Joyce started writing a full-length novel, Steeped in Love, which she self-published in 2018. Joyce's mother died shortly after she began writing the manuscript.

Her second book in the Make Me a Match series, Learning to Love, released in December, 2020. Book three, Love Unleashed, released in October, 2021.

Joyce teaches high school physical education and English.
