= Emily Riddle =

Emily Riddle is a Cree poet from Canada, whose book The Big Melt won the Griffin Poetry Prize's award for best first book of poetry in 2023.

A member of the Alexander First Nation in Morinville, Alberta, she currently lives in Edmonton, where she works as an indigenous relations adviser for the Edmonton Public Library, and is also a textile artist.

The Big Melt was also a winner in the English poetry category at the 2023 Indigenous Voices Awards.
