= Francine Cunningham =

Indigenous writer, artist, and educator

Francine Cunningham (born 1984) is an Indigenous writer, artist, and educator. She is Cree and Métis.

Her debut novel, On/Me, was nominated for the BC and Yukon Book Prize for The Jim Deva Prize for Writing that Provokes. As well as Indigenous Voices Award for a poetry book in English and was nominated for a 2021 City of Vancouver Book Award.

== Personal life ==
Cunningham is originally from Calgary, Alberta. She currently lives in Strathmore, Alberta. She lived in Vancouver, British Columbia for over 15 years.

== Career ==
Cunningham graduated from Keyano College with a diploma in Visual and Performing Arts with conservatory style training in acting. She received her Bachelor of Arts degree in Theatre and Master of Fine Arts in Creative Writing from the University of British Columbia.

In 2014, She participated in the Indigenous Writing Studio at the Banff Arts Center and placed second in the Our Story: Aboriginal Arts and Stories contest.

At present, she runs creative writing and art workshops as a guest in First Nation's reserves across Canada.

Her collection God Isn't Here Today won the 2023 ReLit Award for short fiction.

== Publications ==
=== Anthology contributor ===
- Boobs: Women Explore What It Means to Have Breasts, published March 15, 2016 by Caitlin Press Inc.
- "To plant life (all)" in Watch Your Head, published 2020 by Coach House Books
- "Still, Small Voice" in The Best Canadian Essays 2017, published by TightRope Books
- "A conversation with a massage therapist" in #NotYourPrincess: Voices of Native American Women, published 2017 by Annick Press
- "How to teach hard topics: The Native Youth Program and Indian Residential Schools as a case study" in Transforming Our Practices: Indigenous Art, Pedagogies, and Philosophies, published in 2017 by The National Art Education Association

=== Artwork ===
- "Language," Red Rising Magazine (2018)
- Kimiwan Magazine (2013)

=== Books ===
- On/Me, published January 21, 2020 by Caitlin Press Inc.
- God Isn't Here Today, published May 10, 2022 by Invisible Publishing

=== Poetry ===
- Room Magazine: Indigenous Brilliance (2021)
- Room Magazine: Growing Room (2021)
- "I miss the smell of cooking," Koffler Digital: A Matter of Taste exhibition (2021)
- "Coven, A Spell to Bring My Mom Back From The Dead," Poetry is Dead (2018)
- "Caged," Word and Colour (2017)
- "Star Matter," Red Rising Magazine (2017)
- "Whales Can't save us all but they try," Word and Colour (2017)
- "Through Ribs and Things, Build up, Untitled," The This Magazine (2017)
- "Water is Spirit Love Medicine Balance" in Gatherings: Water Anthology published by Theytus Press (2016)
- "Resistance," Word and Colour (2016)
- "A Conversation With a Massage Therapist," The Maynard (2016)
- "For Your Darkness, Storyteller," Echolocation Magazine (2015)
- "A selection of four poems," Hamilton Arts and Letters (2015)
- "The Road," The Ubyssey (2010)

=== Short creative nonfiction ===
- "Half-Breed," The New Quarterly (2019)
  - Edna Staebler Personal Essay Contest Shortlist
- "Transcendence," The Quebec Writers Federation (2017)
- "Still, Small Voice," The Malahat Review (2016)

=== Short fiction ===
- "God Isn't Here Today," Humber Literary Review (Spring/Summer 2021)
- "Asleep Till You're Awake," The Malahat Review (2020)
- "Starting A Religion," Grain Magazine (2018)
  - Short Grain Contest: 1st Place Winner
- "Complex 2675: Issue One," Joyland Magazine (2017)
- "Last," In Shades Magazine (2017)
- "Secrets like Lead," Litro Magazine (2016)
- "Nanosim#694" (Twitter fiction)
- "The Places In-Between," The Quilliad Magazine (2015)
- "Pornorama," The Puritan (2015)
- "Slips," Active Fiction Project, a chose your own adventure story on the streets of Vancouver (2015)

=== Other ===
- THAT'S AWSM Teen Reality TV show airing on APTN (Television) (2018)
- "The Berg," Telus StoryHive (Web-Series)(2017)
  - Winner 10K Web-Series Edition
- Royal BC Museum, Seeing the Museum Through an Indigenous Lens: Spring Issue, Curious Magazine (Guest Editor)(2017)
- International Innovation Pedagogy in a Digital World. Research summary from Citizens of Tomorrow team. (Article) (2016)
- "Birdie," Prism Literary Magazine (Book Review)(2016)
- "Faerie," Prism Literary Magazine (Book Review)(2016)
- "Author Note," The Town Crier (Non-Fiction) (2016)
- Nineteen Questions, Interview With Author Lee Maracle. (Interview) (2014)
- "Who I (really) am: An exploration of Urban Aboriginal Identity through short film," The Canadian Art Teacher Journal (2014)
- Mixed Tribes zine with some Aboriginal youth at The Museum of Anthropology (2013)
- A Piece of Me with The Native Youth Program at The Museum of Anthropology (2011)

== Awards ==
Awards Received by Cunningham
Year	Award	Work	Result	Ref.
2014	Our Story: Aboriginal Arts and Writing Challenge	"2822"	Second Place	
2017	Hnatyshyn Foundation: REVEAL Indigenous Art Awards		Winner	
2017	Telus StoryHive's 10K Web-Series Edition	"The Berg"	Winner	
2018	Grain Magazine: Short Grain Contest	"Starting A Religion"	Winner	
2019	Indigenous Voices Award, Unpublished Prose Category	Teenage Asylums	Winner	
2019	The Malahat Review's Far Horizon's Fiction Award	"Glitter Like Herpes"	Shortlist	
2019	The New Quarterly's Edna Staebler Personal Essay Contest	"Half-Breed"	Shortlist	
2020	BC and Yukon Book Prize, Jim Deva Prize for Writing that Provokes	On/Me	Nominated	
2020	CV2 Lina Chartrand Poetry Award	"Blood Quantum"	Winner	
2020	Indigenous Voices Award	On/Me	Nominated	
2021	The Malahat Review's Fiction Open Season Award	"Late Nights Over Mayo"	Shortlist	
2023	Carol Shields Prize for Fiction	God Isn't Here Today	Longlist	
2023	ReLit Award	God Isn't Here Today	Winner	
