= Cody Caetano =

Canadian writer

Cody Caetano is a writer from Toronto, Ontario, whose debut memoir Half-Bads in White Regalia was the winner of the Indigenous Voices Award for English prose in 2023.

Caetano, of mixed Portuguese and Anishinaabe descent, studied creative writing at the University of Toronto, where he wrote the book under the mentorship of Lee Maracle. The book is a memoir of his tumultuous childhood as the son of a Portuguese immigrant father and an indigenous mother from the Pinaymootang First Nation who was a survivor of the Sixties Scoop, after they moved to the hamlet of Happyland in Severn, Ontario, near Orillia.

Prior to its publication, excerpts from the manuscript won the Indigenous Voices Award for unpublished English prose in 2020. The book was published in 2022 by Penguin Random House Canada. It was named as one of the best Canadian non-fiction books of the year by CBC Books, and The Globe and Mail, was named to the initial longlist for the 2023 edition of Canada Reads and the 2023 Stephen Leacock Memorial Medal for Humour, and was a finalist for the 2023 Edna Staebler Award.

In 2023, he served as writer-in-residence for the Whistler Writers Festival.
