= Shayne Michael =

Canadian poet

Shayne Michael is a Wolastoqiyik (Maliseet) poet from Canada. He is most noted for his 2020 poetry collection Fif et sauvage, which was the winner in the French poetry category at the 2021 Indigenous Voices Awards.

A member of the Madawaska Maliseet First Nation in New Brunswick, Michael studied dance and theatre direction at the Université Laval. The title of Fif et sauvage reclaims the pejorative slurs "sauvage", referring to his indigenous status, and "fif", referring to his queer sexuality.
