= Michelle Porter =

Canadian writer

Michelle Porter is a Canadian writer, whose debut novel A Grandmother Begins the Story won the 2024 Thomas Head Raddall Award and was a shortlisted finalist for the 2023 Atwood Gibson Writers' Trust Fiction Prize.

Porter, a Métis woman born and raised in Manitoba, currently lives in St. John's, Newfoundland and Labrador where she teaches in the Department of English at Memorial University of Newfoundland. She previously published the poetry collection Inquiries (2019), the non-fiction history book Rebel Women of the East Coast (2005), and the family history memoirs Approaching Fire (2020) and Scratching River (2022).

Porter was a shortlisted Pat Lowther Award finalist in 2020 for Inquiries, and an Indigenous Voices Award nominee for English Creative Nonfiction and Life-Writing in 2021 for Approaching Fire.
