= Michelle Good =

Cree author, poet and lawyer

Michelle Good CM
- Education: University of British Columbia
- Occupations: Novelist; poet; essayist; lawyer
- Writing career
- Notable works: Five Little Indians; "Defying Gravity"; Truth Telling: Seven Conversations about Indigenous Life in Canada. Her latest novel, Eliza Sunshine, was released August 18, 2026.
- Notable awards: HarperCollins/UBC Best New Fiction Prize (2020)
- Website: michellegood.ca

Michelle Good is a Cree writer, poet, and lawyer from Canada, most noted for her debut novel Five Little Indians. She is a member of the Red Pheasant Cree Nation in Saskatchewan. Good has an MFA and a law degree from the University of British Columbia and, as a lawyer, advocated for residential-school survivors.

She lives in Maple Creek, Saskatchewan.

== Early life ==
Good is a member of the Red Pheasant Cree Nation. She was impacted by the Sixties Scoop and spent time in the foster care system. Her great-grandmother participated in the 1885 uprising at Frog Lake and her great-grandmother's uncle was Chief Big Bear. She began to practice law in her 40s, sharing the histories of residential schools in courtrooms.

== Education ==
Good earned a law degree from the University of British Columbia in 1999. She later returned to the university to study creative writing while also running her own law firm. For her master's thesis, she wrote the first draft of what became her debut novel, Five Little Indians. Good completed her Master of Fine Arts in 2014.

== Career ==
Five Little Indians is a story about five British Columbia residential-school survivors. Although the novel itself is fiction, some of the episodes were based on real experiences of her mother and grandmother, who were both survivors of Canada's residential school system. The book was optioned for adaptation in 2021 as a limited television series by producer Martin Katz.

Truth Telling, her second book, is a collection of essays on historical and modern experiences of Indigenous peoples in Canada.

== Awards and honours ==
=== Literary awards ===
==== Five Little Indians ====
- 2018: Won the HarperCollins Canada/UBC Prize for Best New Fiction.
- 2020: Won the Governor General's Award for English-language fiction. It was shortlisted for the Rogers Writers' Trust Fiction Prize and longlisted for the Scotiabank Giller Prize.
- 2021: Won the Amazon.ca First Novel Award and the Kobo Emerging Writer Prize for literary fiction. It also won the City of Vancouver Book Award and the Forest of Reading Evergreen Award for adult readers.
- 2021: Shortlisted for the Ethel Wilson Fiction Prize and the Jim Deva Prize for Writing that Provokes, both part of the BC and Yukon Book Prizes, and for an Indigenous Voices Award for published fiction in English.
- 2022: Won CBC's Canada Reads competition, with Christian Allaire as its champion.

==== Truth Telling ====
- 2023: Shortlisted for the Balsillie Prize for Public Policy.
- 2024: Won the High Plains Book Award in the Indigenous Writer category and was shortlisted for an Indigenous Voices Award for published prose in English.

==== Eliza Sunshine ====
- 2026: Shortlisted for the Giller Prize.

=== Other honours ===
- 2022: Received an honorary Doctor of Letters from Simon Fraser University.
- 2024: Received an honorary Doctor of Letters from the University of the Fraser Valley.
- 2025: Received the Indspire Award for Arts and was appointed a Member of the Order of Canada.

== Works ==
=== Books ===
- Five Little Indians (2020). Novel. HarperCollins. ISBN 9781443459181.
- Truth Telling: Seven Conversations About Indigenous Life in Canada (2023). Essay collection. HarperCollins. ISBN 9781443467810.
- Eliza Sunshine (2026). Novel. Random House Canada. ISBN 9781039011434.

=== Poems ===
- "Ancient Songs" (1996). In Standing Ground: Strength and Solidarity amidst Dissolving Boundaries, edited by Kateri Akiwenzie-Damm and Jeannette Armstrong. Gatherings, vol. 7. Theytus Books.
- "Stone People" (1996). In Standing Ground: Strength and Solidarity amidst Dissolving Boundaries, edited by Kateri Akiwenzie-Damm and Jeannette Armstrong. Gatherings, vol. 7. Theytus Books.
- "Defying Gravity" (2016). In The Best Canadian Poetry in English 2016, edited by Helen Humphreys and Molly Peacock. Tightrope Books. ISBN 9781988040103. Reprinted in the tenth-anniversary edition of The Best of the Best Canadian Poetry in English (2017), edited by Anita Lahey and Molly Peacock. Tightrope Books.

=== Essays in anthologies ===
- "A Tradition of Violence" (2018). In Keetsahnak: Our Missing and Murdered Indigenous Sisters, edited by Kim Anderson, Maria Campbell, and Christi Belcourt. University of Alberta Press.
- "'Play Indians' Inflict Real Harm on Indigenous People" (2022). In Best Canadian Essays 2023, edited by Mireille Silcoff, pp. 41–48. Biblioasis. ISBN 9781771965033.
