= Kateri Akiwenzie-Damm =

Canadian Anishinaabe writer

Kateri Akiwenzie-Damm is an Anishinaabe writer and academic of mixed ancestry from the Chippewas of Nawash First Nation in Canada. She lives and works at Neyaashiinigmiing, Cape Croker Reserve on the Saugeen Peninsula in southwestern Ontario, and in Ottawa, Ontario. She is an assistant professor in the Department of English at the University of Toronto Scarborough.

== Biography ==
A cultural worker with an activist bent, Kateri has initiated many important projects on behalf of Indigenous writers of Turtle Island (North America) and active collaborations with artists and publishers in New Zealand and Australia. A spoken word artist and literary performer as well as poet, writer, editor, and communications consultant, Akiwenzie-Damm works both behind the scenes and before live audiences.

In 1993, she established Kegedonce Press, one of very few literary publishing houses devoted to Indigenous writers. It continues to produce anthologies and single-author books of distinction. Acclaimed Canadian authors Basil H. Johnston (Ojibway), Marilyn Dumont (Métis), and Gregory Scofield (Métis) are among those who have published books through Kegedonce Press. She is both founder and managing editor of the press.

Akiwenzie-Damm has edited two anthologies: skins: Contemporary indigenous writing (2000, with Josie Douglas), and Without Reservation: Indigenous Erotica (2003). These offer works drawn from a variety of Indigenous cultures and artistic traditions from Canada, the United States, Hawai'i, Australia, and New Zealand. Each anthology is co-published with another Indigenous press from the southern hemisphere. She also came up with the concept, initiated, and advocated internationally for support for Honouring Words: International Indigenous Authors Celebration Tour. This was an international event involving Indigenous authors from Canada, US, Australia and New Zealand. The first, and most successful, of the three international tours was also organized by Akiwenzie-Damm.

== Bibliography ==
- 1993 - 2003: My Heart is a Stray Bullet. Kegedonce Press, Cape Croker ON
- 2000: Skins: Contemporary Indigenous Writing. (Editor) with Josie Douglas; Kegedonce Press, Cape Croker Reserve, ON. Co-published with Aboriginal Australian publisher, Jukurrpa Books
- 2003: Without Reservation: Indigenous Erotica. Kegedonce Press, Cape Croker Reserve, ON. Co-published with Hula Publishers, Wellington, New Zealand
- 2006: with Warren Cariou, W'Daub Awae, Daniel Heath Justice, Lesley Belleau: Speaking True: A Kegedonce Press Anthology. Kegedonce ISBN 0978499859
- 2015: The Stone Collection, HighWater Press, MB. ISBN 978-1-55379-549-0.
- 2019: "Nimkii" in This Place: 150 Years Retold

=== CDs ===
- 2003: Standing Ground with The Nishin Spoken Word Project, Nishin Productions, Cape Croker Reserve, ON. A Constellation of Bones, in collaboration with various artists.

== See also ==
- List of writers from peoples indigenous to the Americas
- Native American Studies
