= Indigenous literature in Canada =

Indigenous literature in Canada is the collective written works of Indigenous peoples of Canada, who include the First Nations, Inuit, and Métis people of Canada. Each cultural diverse group has its own literature, language and culture.

Writing was not widespread among Indigenous peoples in Canada prior to European contact, so literature can sometimes be expanded to include the robust oral histories and lyric poetry of Indigenous peoples in Canada. Building upon robust oral traditions, Indigenous writers work in many genres today, including poetry, playwriting, and novels.

One of the earliest known Indigenous writers of Canada to publish in English was E. Pauline Johnson (Grand River Mohawk, 1742–1807). She wrote poetry and short stories, which were anthologized, and she published a collection of poems in The White Wampum in 1895.

Since Inuit, Métis, and First Nations are so diverse, the term "Indigenous literature" can be misleading and homogenizing. As Okanagan writer Jeannette Armstrong states in one interview, "I would stay away from the idea of 'Native' literature, there is no such thing. There is Mohawk literature, there is Okanagan literature, but there is no generic Native in Canada". However, the term is a broad umbrella term covering disparate writing traditions.

== History ==
Many Indigenous cultures in Canada and worldwide are deeply rooted in oral tradition. Oral tradition includes myths, folklore, and legends. Passing down oral tradition takes great care on the part of the storyteller, as the moral of the tale and its underlying truth must be retold accurately. Oral tradition may take the form of songs, prayers, spiritual teachings and stories, shaping the everyday life of the community and the individual's sense of identity. The significance of oral tradition is cultural transmission from one generation to the next. The knowledge and wisdom of the Elders serve as link between the young generation and the past generation, keeping the livelihood of a culture intact.

When the British and French colonized the land that is now Canada, settlers prioritized written literature over oral literature, under the bias that oral must be uncivilized, and written is civilized. Today, many Indigenous societies rely on oral tradition as a tool for expression and knowledge transmission, despite having adopted written literature. For over a century, the Government of Canada has controlled and regulated Indigenous cultural practices in the form of policy and regulation. The Residential School System separated Indigenous children from their families and communities in order to "kill the Indian in the child". In other words, the purpose of this system was to indoctrinate Indigenous children with Western and Christian thought.

Commonly described as cultural genocide, the residential school generated severe cultural, psychological, and social impacts on Indigenous communities. The passing down of culture and knowledge was interrupted as children were removed from their communities. Children experienced physical, psychological and sexual abuse in these schools, and were not allowed to speak their languages.

=== Mi'kmaq literature ===
Traditional oral stories of Mi’kmaq define their values and beliefs about the world in which they live. "The Legend of the Hand of the Medicine Man" and "The Invisible One" are examples of Mi’kmaq oral stories. Glooscap is a commonly known cultural hero in Mi’kmaq literature. A trickster figure who outsmarts many self-serving characters, Glooscap appears in the Creation Story and "Muin, the Bear's Child". Glooscap also appears in Rita Joe’s poetry and Lorne Simon’s novel, Stones and Switches. Rita Joe is a well-known Mi’kmaq writer and poet who received the Order of Canada in 1990. She writes about the loss and resilience of her culture, themes which appear poems such as "I lost my talk" and "Wen net ki’l - Who are you?". She writes in both Mi’kmaq and English. Other Mi’kmaq poets include Lindsay Marshall, Shirley Bear and Teresa Marshall.

=== Mohawk literature ===
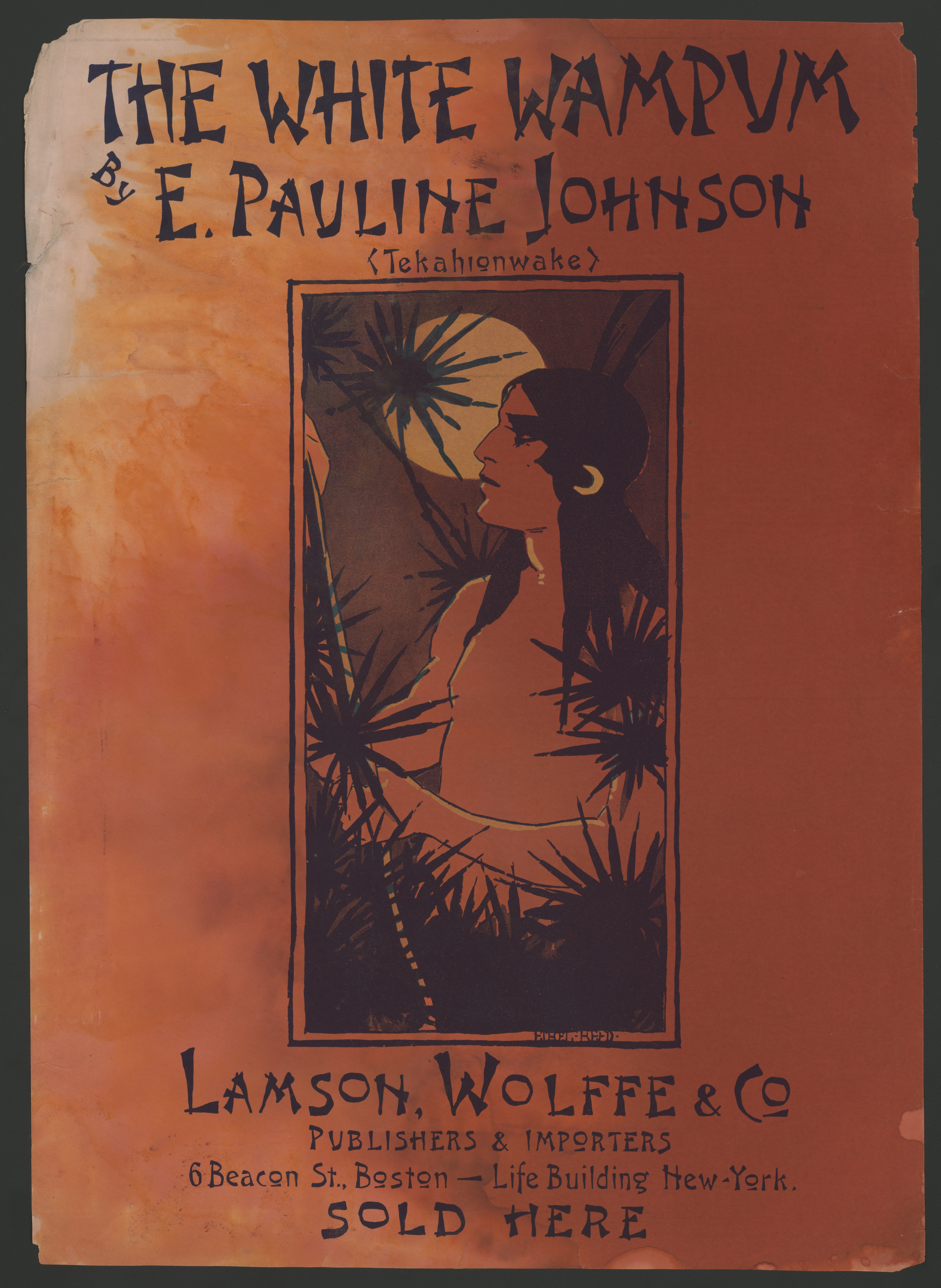
The White Wampum (1895) by E. Pauline Johnson (Grand River Mohawk, 1742–1807)

The Mohawk people are geographically dispersed across Canada and the United States. Mohawk Nation is one of the six nations in the Iroquois Confederacy, aside from Oneida, Seneca, Onondaga, Cayuga and Tuscarora Nations. The Confederacy led to the creation of a governance system called the Great Law of Peace. Mohawk traditions, beliefs and worldview are founded upon the Creation Story, the Great Law of Peace, the concept of the Seventh Generation, the Two Row Wampum Treaty and the Confederacy. Beth Brant is an essayist and short-story writer who incorporates Mohawk Creation Story in her writings. Writer Peter Blue Cloud, from Kahnawake, Quebec also utilizes the creation story in his work. Cloud's "Weaver’s Spider’s Web" features the Coyote, a trickster figure, and a powerful woman, an important symbol in Longhouse cultures.

=== Anishinaabe literature ===
The Anishinaabe include the Ojibway, Odawa, Potawatomi, Algonquin, and Oji-Cree. A century-old oral tradition has been documented in collections by Basil Johnston such as Ojibway Heritage, Tales the Elders Told, and Sacred Legends. Author George Copway (1818–69) wrote an autobiography titled The Life, History, and Travels of Kah-ge-gah-bowh (1847) telling a story of an Indigenous person having been converted to Christianity. It was the first book written by a Canadian Indigenous person in English. Copway's work is contrasted by Richard Wagamese’s Keeper’N Me, an autobiographical novel that prioritizes Ojibway beliefs and values. Drew Hayden Taylor addresses Indigenous identity and other topics in his plays such as Toronto at Dreamers’ Rock, and essays like "Pretty Like a White Boy: The Adventures of a Blue Eyed Ojibway".

=== Cree literature ===
Some recurring themes in Cree literature include the vanishing of buffalo signifying the disappearance of a way of life centered around the migration of buffalo, as well the notion of confinement on the reserves. Tomson Highway is a Cree writer, playwright, and musician born in northern Manitoba. Highway’s autobiographical novel, Kiss of the Fur Queen features the trickster figure Weesageechak, an important figure that parallels Christ in the Christian world. The themes of the novel include sexual abuse in residential school and healing.

== Notable literary awards and authors ==
=== Periodical Marketers of Canada Aboriginal Literature Award ===
The Periodical Marketers of Canada Aboriginal Literature Award is an Aboriginal Literature award inspired by the First Nation Communities Read Program. This award will give the award winning writers a title selection and a prize money of $5,000.

In 2003, the First Nations public library community launched the First Nations Communities Read in Ontario. The program recommends literature that encourages family literacy as well as storytelling and information sharing that affects several generations. The program recognizes works written and illustrated by First Nation, Métis, and Inuit writers. Communities Read also encourage works that have support or public approval by First Nations, Métis, and Inuit advisors and consultants.

Darrell Dennis, in his book Peace, Pipe Dreams, won the Periodical Marketers of Canada Aboriginal Literature Award for 2015–2016. His book shows knowledge, tact, and humor when addressing issues such as religion, treaties, and residential schools. It gives the reader a better understanding of Canada's complex history. His book also empathizes the stereotypes and historical events for Indigenous in North America.

=== Burt Award ===
Richard Wagamese’s book, Indian Horse, won the Burt Award for First Nations, Metis, and Inuit Literature in 2013. Wagamese's book showcases the terrors of residential schools and illuminates ice hockey, a popular sport in Canada, in a positive light.

Bev Sellar’s popular book They Called Me Number One: Secrets and Survival at an Indian Residential School, has won many awards. The book is also part of the public archive for Truth and Reconciliation Commission. The book is a memoir about Sellar’s time at a residential school. Her books also focuses on how residential schools impacted her family. Her book won third place for the Burt Award in 2014.

=== Governor General's Award ===
Katherena Vermette won the Governor General’s Literary Award in 2013 for her poetry book, "North End Love Songs". The poems showcase the beauty of the toughest and notorious neighborhood in Winnipeg, the North End, where her brother also went missing. Her poems in this poetry book are courageous and intense.

David Robertson co-won the 2021 Governor General's Literary Award for young people's literature — illustration with illustrator Julie Flett for their picture book On the Trapline. The book follows a young boy's trip with his moshom to the family trapline. He first won the Governor General's Literary Awards in 2017 for his book When We Were Alone.

=== Indigenous Voices Awards ===
The Indigenous Voices Awards were created in 2017, in response to a controversy that arose a group of Canadian writers were criticized for campaigning on Twitter in favour of a prize supporting cultural appropriation. In response, Toronto lawyer Robin Parker launched a crowdfunding campaign to create a new prize for First Nations, Métis and Inuit writers in Canada. The crowdfunding campaign was set with a goal of $10,000, but ultimately attracted over $140,000 in donations.

The first Indigenous Voices Awards were presented in 2018, with winners including poet Billy-Ray Belcourt, novelist J. D. Kurtness and young adult novelist Aviaq Johnston.

=== Notable authors ===
Lee Maracle won a Queen's Diamond Jubilee Medal in her work in promoting writing in Aboriginal Youth. Maracle tells a story about a girl named Celia, her family, and village. Celia first appeared in Maracles’ novel Ravensong. This story is about Celia when she is an adult. The book tells a story about the horrifying impacts from residential schools, suicide, and the loss of tradition.

=== Children's literature ===
==== Norma Fleck Award for Canadian Children’s Non Fiction ====
In 2000, The Shaman's Nephew: A Life in the Far North, written by Sheldon Oberman and illustrated by Inuk artist Simon Tookoome, won the Norma Fleck Award for Canadian Children's Non Fiction. The book consists of 28 short stories that depict various aspects of Inuit life.

Larry Loyie and Constance Brisssenden's As Long as the River Flows received the award in 2003. The four chapter picture book recounts Loyie's childhood in Northern Alberta and addresses themes such as Cree culture and residential schools.

==== Marilyn Baillie Picture Book Award ====
The Marilyn Baillie Picture Book Award rewards excellence for Canadian illustrated picture books, aimed at children ages three to eight. A finalist in 2006, Nicola I. Campbell's Shi-Shi-Etko follows a young girl who will attend residential school in four days time. In 2016, Sometimes I feel like a Fox, written and illustrated by Danielle Daniels won the grand prize. The book introduces totem animals and their importance to Anishinaabe culture and self-understanding.

==== TD Canadian Children’s Literature Award ====
Valued at $30,000, the TD Canadian Children's Literature Award is Canada's biggest literary prize for children's literature. Nicola I. Campbell's Shi-Shi-Etko was a finalist in 2006, but the book's sequel Shi-Chi's Canoe won the grand prize in 2009. Shi-Shi's Canoe addresses a young boy's residential school experience and their feelings of isolation and hope.

Melanie Florence's debut book Missing Nimâmâ won the award in 2016. The book is the first children's book to explicitly address the controversy of Canada's missing and murdered indigenous women. The story follows a young daughter who was left behind and the bond she shares with her mother through Cree culture and language.

== Activism ==
=== Truth and Reconciliation Commission ===
The Truth and Reconciliation Commission of Canada, or TRC, is an organization whose focus is to recognize the impact of Canadian residential schools on Indigenous peoples and revitalize the relationship between Canadians and Indigenous peoples. In its work, the TRC has listened and recorded the testimonies of residential school survivors. Currently, their It Matters to Me campaign is aimed at the importance of reconciliation. The TRC has released a suggested reading list of significant works dealing with residential schools and their effects.

=== Indigenous Book Club Month ===
In tandem with Canada's Aboriginal History Month, the Government of Canada has marked June as Indigenous Book Club Month. The goal of this movement is to restore the relationship between Canadian and Indigenous peoples. By the promotion of this literature, the government hopes to foster a better understanding of Indigenous history, culture, and affairs. On social media, the official hashtag for the movement is #IndigenousReads.

== See also ==
- Canadian literature
- Native American literature
- Aboriginal Australian literature
- Māori poetry
