= J. D. Kurtness =

Canadian writer

Julie Kurtness, credited as J. D. Kurtness, is a Canadian writer, who won the Indigenous Voices Award for French Prose in 2018 for her novel De vengeance. A member of the Innu nation originally from Mashteuiatsh, Quebec, she published De vengeance, her debut novel, in 2017.

Her second novel, Aquariums, was published in French in 2019, with an English translation slated for publication in 2022.
