= Kegedonce Press =

Indigenous publishing house

- Founded: 1993
- Founder: Kateri Akiwenzie-Damm
- Country of origin: Canada
- Headquarters location: Owen Sound, Ontario
- Publication types: Books
- Nonfiction topics: Indigenous peoples
- Official website: www.kegedonce.com

Kegedonce Press is an Indigenous publishing house in Neyaashiinigmiing Reserve No. 27 (Cape Croker), Ontario, Canada, owned by Kateri Akiwenzie-Damm. Started in 1993, it is one of only a handful of dedicated Indigenous publishers in Canada. Their motto is "w'daub awae", which means "speaking true" in Ojibwe. Kegedonce Press describes itself as committed to the publication of beautifully written and designed Indigenous literature, both nationally and internationally. They are the only Indigenous publisher that prioritizes poetry, as Kateri is a poet and recognizes that many new Indigenous authors begin their writing careers as poets.

Indigenous-owned and operated, this literary press publishes work by some of the most widely known contemporary Indigenous writers, including titles by Kateri Akiwenzie-Damm, Joanne Arnott, Warren Cariou, Cherie Dimaline, Al Hunter, Daniel Heath Justice, Basil H. Johnston, Aaron Paquette, and Richard Van Camp.
