= Tenille Campbell =

Dene and Métis poet and a photographer

- Citizenship: Canadian
- Education: University of British Columbia (MFA)
- Occupations: Author, poet, photographer
- Writing career
- Notable work: IndianLovePoems
- Website: www.tenillecampbell.com

Tenille K. Campbell is a Dene and Métis poet and a photographer from English River First Nation.

== Education ==
She holds an MFA in creative writing from the University of British Columbia, where she studied with Richard Van Camp. Her MFA dissertation was titled Nuniyé Tehlgh-th : land of the wolf, and was a "young adult novel tells the story of Kelly Estatheneh, a young Dene woman living at the English River First Nation reserve in Northern Saskatchewan." In November 2025, she gained her PhD in English Literature from the University of Saskatchewan, where she also served as the University Library Indigenous Storyteller in Residence in 2024. Her PhD research focused on Indigenous Literature.

== Career ==
Her artistic works often focus on Indigenous people in Canada. She is the owner of Sweetmoon Photography, which specializes in capturing photographs of Indigenous people. Her photography has appeared in Radio Canada International. University of Saskatchewan News, and Eagle Feather News. Additionally, a photograph from her series entitled Urban Indigenous Woman was selected as the cover image for the second edition of A Recognition of Being by Kim Anderson. Her portrait photography portfolio includes work with Chelsea Rooney and Roseanne Supernault. Campbell is also the co-creator of tea&bannock, a blog that was "born out of a desire for a sense of community with other Indigenous women photographers – a place that feels like you are sitting around a table, enjoying tea and bannock".

Campbell was selected by Lisa Charleyboy, host of CBC's New Fire, as the first guest on the show to talk about #IndianLovePoems. Of the collection, she said: "I couldn't put it down. I truly saw myself reflected within those pages, and I also saw every Indigenous woman I know." Jesse Thistle of UMFM's At The Edge Of Canada: Indigenous Research echoed the sentiment, saying: "there were some representations and images of incredibly strong Indigenous men...some of the healthiest, some of the loveliest...being an Indigenous man myself, I immediately latched on to those, and I was like 'oh I so want to be that type of person."

In 2017, Campbell was named one of CBC Saskatchewan's "Future 40".

== Selected works ==
Poetry

- #IndianLovePoems (poetry, 2017).
- #KissingIndigenous (photographic series, in progress)
- Contributor to Sing: Poetry from the Indigenous Americas (ed. Allison Hedge Coke)
- nedi nezu (Good Medicine) (poetry, 2021).

=== Photography ===
- Contributor to "Urban Tribe" and "Dreaming in Indian" (Eds. Mary Beth Leatherdale and Lisa Charleyboy)
