= Jesse Thistle =

Indigenous Canadian historian and writer (born 1976)

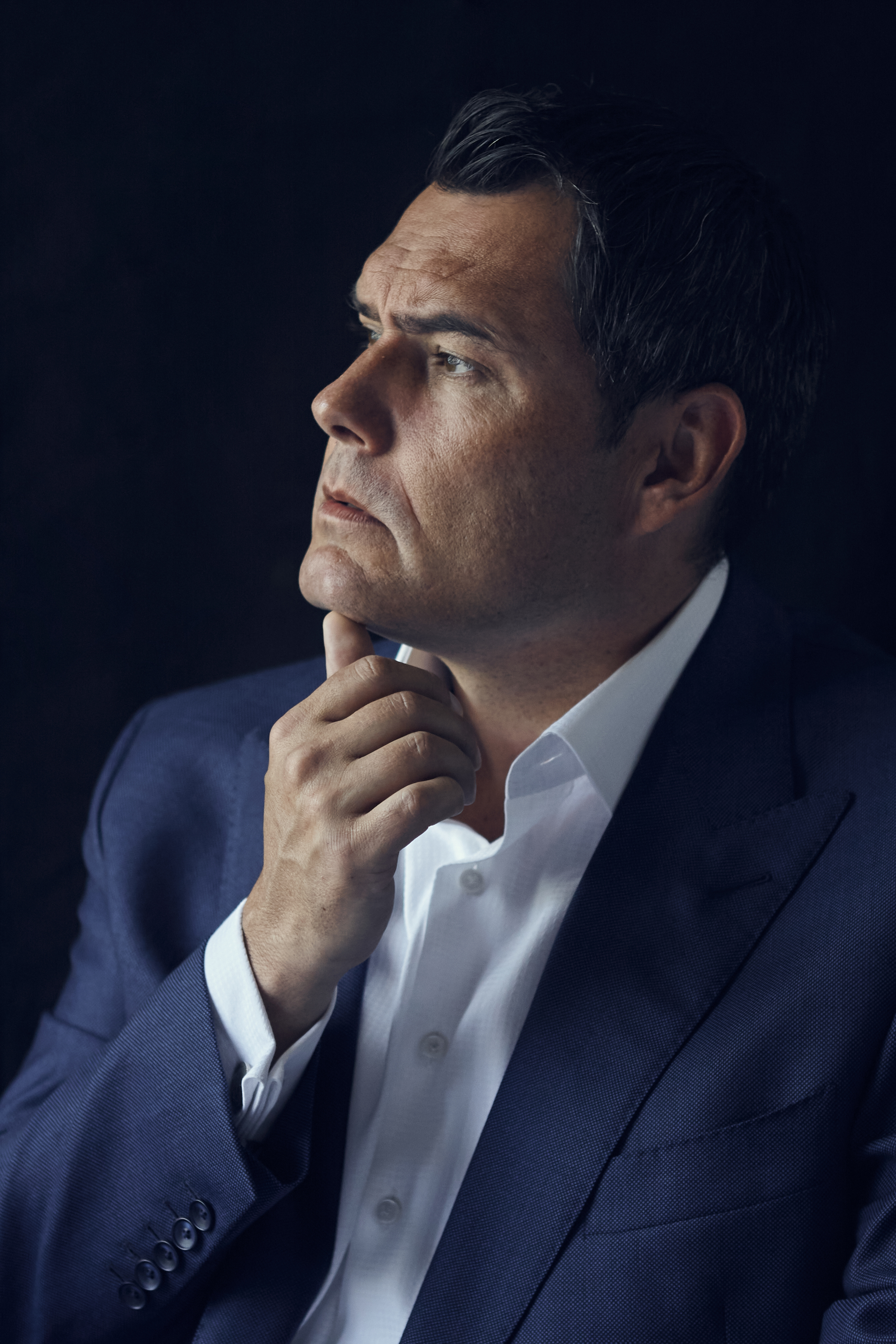
- Born: 1976; Prince Albert
- Education: York University
- Occupations: Historian, teacher, writer, university teacher
- Employer: York University
- Awards: Indigenous Voices Awards (From the Ashes, 2020)
- Website: jessethistle.com

Jesse Thistle (born 1976) is a Métis-Cree author. He is a registered citizen of the Métis Nation Saskatchewan and an assistant professor in the department of humanities at York University in Toronto. He is the author of the 2019 memoir, From the Ashes, and 2022 poetry book Scars and Stars. From the Ashes is considered one of the "most notable" 100 books Simon and Schuster U.S and all its 31 international imprints has published between 1924-2024, and is the only Canadian book included. Former CEO of Simon and Schuster US, Jonathan Karp, has singled out Thistle's memoir calling it perhaps “the greatest accomplishment during Kevin (Hanson's) tenure,” since the inception of Simon and Schuster Canada in 2013; Hanson was the inaugural publisher until 2024. Thistle is also a PhD candidate in the history program at York University, where he is working on theories of intergenerational, historic trauma, and survivance of road allowance Métis people. This work involves reflections on his own previous struggles with addiction and homelessness.

== Family and personal life ==
Thistle was born in Prince Albert, Saskatchewan. In 1979 he and his two brothers were removed from his family home and moved to Brampton, Ontario to be brought up by his paternal grandparents. During his late teens and twenties Thistle struggled with addiction, homelessness and served several brief stints in jail for petty theft. After an unsuccessful robbery attempt in 2006, Thistle turned himself in to police and entered a drug rehabilitation program.

Much of Thistle's historical research is based on the stories and experience of his family and ancestors. His mother, Blanche Morrissette, is Métis-Cree, and a registered status Indian with Mistawasis First Nation #374, Saskatchewan, and was a member of the Park Valley road allowance community (Erin Ferry Road allowance) between Debden and Big River, Saskatchewan. Blanche's paternal line is Cree; her maternal line were Red River and Batoche Métis resistance fighters.His father, Cyril "Sonny" Thistle, is of Scot-Algonquin ancestry and has been missing since 1982. Thistle's maternal great-grandmother, Marianne Ledoux Morissette, was present and supported the Métis Resistance in 1885 during the Battle of Batoche. The documentary Family Camera directed by Marc de Guerre for TVOntario includes images of the Morissette family and interviews with Thistle, his mother and aunts where they recount the history and experience of living in the road allowance community and the legacy of the Canadian government's treatment of the Métis people.

== Education ==
Thistle obtained a Bachelor of Liberal Arts and Professional Studies with a specialized honours in history from York University in 2015. His undergraduate thesis is entitled: James Bay and Mattawa as an Interconnected Fur Trade Region: Illuminating Lake Timiskaming’s Historic Metis Community and was supervised by York historian Carolyn Podruchny. He completed a Masters of History at the University of Waterloo in 2016, where his thesis was entitled: The Puzzle of the Morrissette-Arcand Clan: A History of Metis Historic and Intergenerational Trauma and where he worked with Susan Roy. In the fall of 2016 Thistle began work on a PhD in the history department at York University.

Thistle is a Trudeau Scholar, administered by the Pierre Elliott Trudeau Foundation, a Vanier scholar and was awarded a Governor General's Silver Medal in 2016. He has won numerous other awards, including the Odessa Award in 2014 and the Dr. James Wu prize in 2015 for his paper "We are children of the river: Toronto’s Lost Metis History."

== Professional work ==
Thistle's use of academic research as a means of healing and understanding of his personal story as an Indigenous person growing up disconnected from his community and its history and his past experiences with homelessness, addiction and incarceration has formed the basis for his original and innovative research contributions. Thistle's historical research has used his own past and identity as a way to examine the position of Metis people and culture within Canadian society, particularly around the idea of inter-generational trauma.

Early historical research Thistle conducted to argue in favour of the possibility of habitation of Métis people in the historic area of Toronto was revisited by Thistle in 2016 in the article "Listening to History: Correcting the Toronto Metis Land Acknowledgement." Thistle's research now suggests there were no permanent Métis settlements in Toronto and he suggests the standard land acknowledgement text used in the Toronto area, in particular by the Toronto District School Board, that includes the Metis is incorrect. A position he reiterates in an article in the New Yorker magazine.

The main thrust of Thistle's research involves research into the road allowance Métis in Saskatchewan through the research into his own family history. The recovery of his family history and making connections to his Indigenous culture through archival documents forms the backbone of his practice and documented in the article "Archives as Good Medicine" as well as in the short film kiskisiwin | remembering, a documentary film directed by Martha Stiegman. Along with Podruchny, Thistle conducted a series of site visits and interviews in northern Saskatchewan and his PhD thesis is entitled: Indigence, Invisibility, and Indifference: Metis Life in Road Allowances Communities on the Canadian Prairies. His work on the Road Allowance Métis community has been featured on programs such as the CBC Radio's "Unreserved" program.

He was the National Representative for Indigenous Homelessness (2015-2017) for the Canadian Observatory on Homelessness for their research priority areas and in that position he called for an Indigenous understanding of homelessness, arguing most current strategies for addressing homelessness do not account for the impacts of inter-generational trauma, the deep sense of loss of culture and connection to the idea of home for survivors of experiences such as residential schools and the Sixties Scoop, and that addressing Indigenous homelessness must take Indigenous worldviews into account. Thistle published a new definition of Indigenous homelessness in October, 2017. Thistle no longer works directly in the homelessness or housing sectors as he believes since the COVID-19 crisis and opioid crisis the nature of homelessness in Canada has changed to the point that his knowledge is outdated.

In 2019 Thistle published a memoir entitled From the Ashes. The memoir detailed his childhood, youth, and early adulthood, dealing with issues such as foster care, homelessness and addiction, and his quest for higher education that led ultimately to a professorship and love and emplacement. The book was praised for its openness in expressing loss and pain, and for its eloquence, especially as it relates the multigenerational impacts of colonization and trauma. Among the book's champions are noted psychologist Gabor Mate, NYT bestselling authors Emma Donoghue and Amanda Lindhout, and the creator of Housing First Sam Tsemberis. "From the Ashes" appeared on numerous bestseller lists since release and was Canada's bestselling title by a Canadian author in 2020, and was the best selling Indigenous memoir of the last 20 years. In 2020 it was also selected by George Canyon as his choice for the CBC Canada Reads competition.

== Awards and honours ==
- #1 Bestselling Indigenous memoir in Canada between 2005-2023 - From the Ashes.
- From the Ashes named one of the "most notable" 100 books Simon and Schuster has published over its one-hundred year history - 1924-2024. Notably, Thistle's memoir is the only Canadian authored book to make this list alongside authors Ernest Hewmingway, Margret Mitchell, Ray Bradbury, Friedrich Backman, Stephen King, Frank McCourt, and F. Scott Fitzgerald among others.
- #1 Bestselling Canadian book of 2020 (any genre or format) - From the Ashes
- #1 Most borrowed Canadian non-fiction book of 2021 - From the Ashes
- #1 Bestselling Canadian non-fiction book of 2020 - From the Ashes
- #1 Bestselling two-year-old Canadian book; #2 bestselling two-year-old book in Canada (both domestic and international) - 2019-2021 (any genre of format) - From the Ashes
- Winner of the Kobo Emerging Writer Prize for non-fiction
- From the Ashes chosen #3 on Indigo's best books of 2019.
- Scars and Stars chosen as #6 best book of 2022.
- Named one of 50 most influential Torontonians of 2019.

== Selected works ==
- Jameson, Elizabeth; Podruchny, Carolyn; Thistle, Jesse A. (2018). "Women on the Margins of Imperial Plots: Farming on Borrowed Land". Journal of the Canadian Historical Association. 29: 158. doi:10.7202/1065722ar. hdl:10315/36849.
- Thistle, Jesse (2019). From the Ashes: My Story of Being Métis, Homeless, and Finding My Way. Simon & Schuster. ISBN 9781982101213.
- Thistle, Jesse. The Puzzle of the Morrissette-Arcand Clan: A History of Metis Historic and Intergenerational Trauma. Winnipeg: University of Manitoba Press.
- Thistle, Jesse A. The Definition of Indigenous Homelessness in Canada, Canadian Observatory on Homelessness, Toronto: York University, 2017. http://homelesshub.ca/IndigenousHomelessness
- Thistle, Jesse A. "We are children of the river: Toronto’s Lost Metis History," YOUR Review, vol 3 (2016).
- Thistle, Jesse A., "kiskisiwin – remembering: Challenging Indigenous Erasure in Canada’s Public History Displays," Active History (July 3, 2017).
- Thistle, Jesse A. "Listening to History: Correcting the Toronto Metis Land Acknowledgement," Active History (December 2, 2016).
- Thistle, Jesse A. "Dishinikawshon Jesse: A Life Transformed," Aboriginal Policy Studies 5, 1 (2015): 69-93.
- Podruchny, Carolyn, and Jesse Thistle. "A Geography of Blood: Uncovering the Hidden Histories of Metis Peoples in Canada." In Spaces of Difference: Conflicts and Cohabitation, edited by Ursala Lehmkuhl, Hans-Jurgen Lusebrink, and Laurence McFalls, 61–82. New York: Waxmann, 2016.
