= From the Ashes (memoir) =

2019 memoir by Jesse Thistle

- Author: Jesse Thistle
- Publisher: Simon & Schuster
- Publication date: 2019
- ISBN: 978-1982101213

From the Ashes is a 2019 memoir by Métis-Cree academic and writer Jesse Thistle.

The memoir documents Thistle's difficult upbringing, struggles with homelessness, addiction and his Indigenous identity, yet is centred on the theme of love. It concludes with his success in academia, finding love, and community emplacement. From the Ashes is the bestselling Indigenous memoir in Canada over the last 20 years, ranking 4th overall of Canadian memoirs published between 2006-2021, behind only Chris Hadfield, Wayne Gretzky, and Amanda Lindhout. From the Ashes was also named on January 31, 2024 one of the "most notable" 100 books Simon and Schuster U.S. and all its 31 international imprints have published between 1924-2024. Notably, From the Ashes is the only Canadian authored book to make this list alongside authors Ernest Hewmingway, Margret Mitchell, Ray Bradbury, Friedrich Backman, Stephen King, Frank McCourt, and F. Scott Fitzgerald among others.

The book was met with praise from reviewers, attracted awards for Thistle and was a Canadian bestselling book in 2019, 2020, 2021, and 2022.

== Author ==
Jesse Thistle is a Métis-Cree professor at York University who researches Michif road allowance life in mid 20th-century Saskatchewan. He has also worked in the fields of Indigenous homelessness, addiction and intergenerational trauma. From the Ashes is Thistle's first book.

== Synopsis ==
The book documents Thistle's difficult upbringing in Saskatchewan, his father's addiction issues, and being taken into state custody before being cared for by his grandparents in Brampton, Ontario. From the Ashes details Thistle's struggle with his own Indigenous identity, his relationship with his brothers, his use of drugs, being kicked out of his grandparents home and his time living on the streets in Vancouver, Brampton, Ottawa and Toronto.

Thistle's story is told over short chapters, and makes use of prose and poetry. As a young adult, Thistle struggles with suicidal ideation, and he is jailed, before finding redemption through university education.

== Critical reception ==
Jesse Winter writing in The Toronto Star describes the narration as brutal and humble. Michelle Nolden, writing in Toronto Life described it as inspirational and praised the author's brutal honesty and bravery and described the book as a "beautiful story of hope, love and perseverance".

As of October 2020, From the Ashes was the bestselling Canadian book of 2020 in any genre or format; it finished the year in this spot. The book was the most borrowed Canadian non-fiction book of 2021 and the bestselling Canadian non-fiction book of 2020. It was also the bestselling two-year-old Canadian book in 2021. The book was featured in the Canadian Broadcasting's Canada Reads competition in 2020.
