= Daniel Heath Justice =

American-born Cherokee Canadian academic and writer

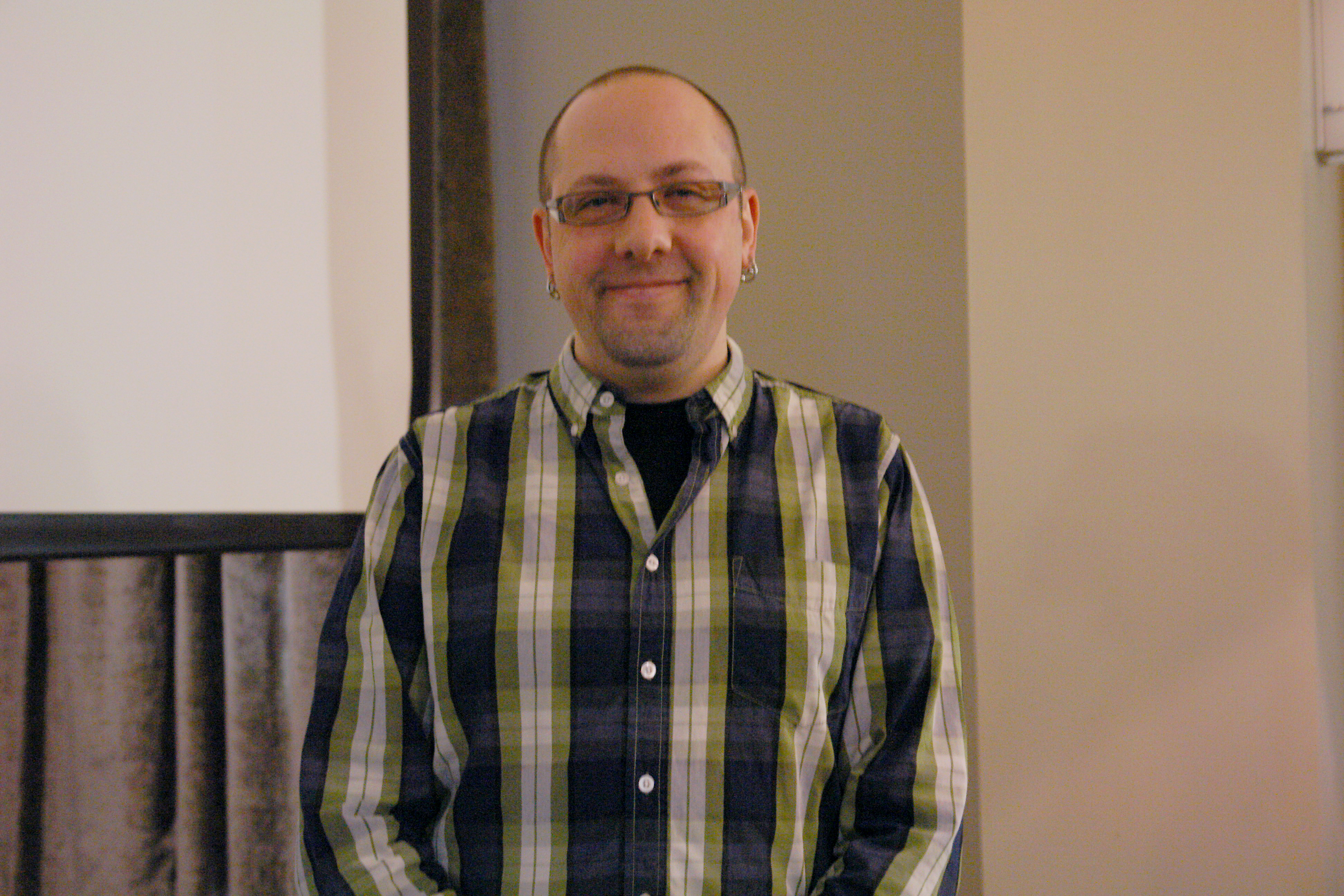
- Born: Colorado, United States
- Citizenship: Cherokee Nation and U.S.
- Education: University of Northern Colorado, University of Nebraska–Lincoln
- Occupations: Professor, writer
- Notable work: Our Fire Survives the Storm: A Cherokee Literary History, Oxford Handbook of Indigenous American Literature, Sovereign Erotics: A Collection of Two-Spirit Literature, Why Indigenous Literatures Matter

Daniel Heath Justice OC is an American-born Canadian academic and citizen of the Cherokee Nation. He is professor of First Nations and Indigenous Studies and English at the University of British Columbia. He started his studies at University of Northern Colorado and received his M.A. and Ph.D. from the University of Nebraska–Lincoln. He began his career at the University of Toronto, where he taught English and worked in association with the Aboriginal Studies Program.

Justice is the author of Why Indigenous Literatures Matter (2018) (Wilfrid Laurier University Press), Our Fire Survives the Storm: A Cherokee Literary History (2006) (University of Minnesota Press), as well as his Indigenous fantasy trilogy, The Way of Thorn & Thunder - Kynship (2005), Wyrwood (2006), and Dreyd (2007) which was published by Kegedonce Press.

== Awards ==
Why Indigenous Literatures Matter (2018) is the winner of the NAISA (Native American and Indigenous Studies Association) Award for Subsequent Book published in 2018. It also received the 2019 PROSE Award, granted by the Association of American Publishers, in the category of Literature and was nominated for the Gabrielle Roy Prize for Literary Criticism from the Association of Canadian and Quebec Literatures (ACQL). In 2015, Justice was awarded the UBC Killam Research Prize in recognition of his leadership in the field of Indigenous Literary Studies and for his many contributions to it, including Our Fire Survives the Storm: A Cherokee Literary History (2006), The Oxford Handbook of Indigenous American Literature (co-edited with James H. Cox, 2014), and Why Indigenous Literature Matters (2018). In 2010, he was awarded the Ludwik and Estelle Jus Memorial Human Rights Prize at the University of Toronto. James Cox of the University of Texas at Austin stated that "Daniel has devoted his life and work to advocating for the civil and human rights of the silences and dispossessed peoples of our world." The University of Toronto added that Justice's "positive and lasting impact is felt directly at the U of T through his one-on-one work with native students, his ability to bring previously inexperienced young people to thinking about social justice and creative activism against oppression and his encouragement of both graduate and undergraduate students to take on community service as part of classes."

Justice was made an officer of the Order of Canada in 2021.

== Works ==
Fiction

- Novels
  - Kynship (2005)
  - Wyrwood (2006)
  - Dreyd (2007)
  - The Way of Thorn and Thunder: The Kynship Chronicles (2011)
- Short Stories
  - “Ander’s Awakening” in W'daub Awae, Speaking True: A Kegedonce Press Anthology (2010)
  - “High Fashion and the Necromantic Arts” in Girls Who Bite Back: Witches, Mutants, Slayers and Freaks (2004)
  - “The Boys Who Became the Hummingbirds” in Love Beyond Body, Space & Time: An Indigenous LGBT Sci-Fi Anthology (2016) and illustrated in Moonshot, Volume 2: The Indigenous Comics Collection (2017)
  - “The Keeper of the Bones” in Zegaabam: Indigenous Horror Stories (2024)
  - “Tatterborn” in Read, Listen, Tell: Indigenous Stories from Turtle Island (2017)

Non-fiction

- Why Indigenous Literatures Matter (2018)
- Our Fire Survives the Storm: A Cherokee Literary History (2006), Citizenship And Sovereignty Edition (2026)
- Badger (2015)
- Raccoon (2021)
- Reasoning Together: The Native Critics Collective (2008) (co-author)

As editor

- A Journal of Lesbian and Gay Studies: Sexuality, Nationality, Indigeneity (2008) (with Mark Rifkin and Bethany Schneider)
- Sovereign Erotics: A Collection of Two-Spirit Literature (2011) (with Qwo-Li Driskill, Deborah Miranda, and Lisa Tatonetti)
- The Oxford Handbook of Indigenous American Literature (2014) (with James H. Cox)
- Allotment Stories: Indigenous Land Relations Under Settler Siege (2022) (with Jean M. O’Brien)

== See also ==
- List of writers from peoples Indigenous to the Americas
- Native American Studies
