= Aurora and Cephalus =

Aurora and Cephalus may refer to:

- Aurora and Cephalus (Boucher)
- Aurora and Cephalus (Guérin)
