= Muse (novel) =

2013 novel by Mary Novik

- Cover of paperback
- Author: Mary Novik
- Cover artist: Kelly Hill (design)
- Language: English
- Genre: Novel
- Published: 2013 Doubleday Canada
- Publication place: Canada
- Media type: Print (paperback) and e-book
- Pages: 324
- ISBN: 978-0-385-66821-7 trade paperback, 978-0-385-66822-4 e-book, 978-0-385-66823-1 paperback
- Preceded by: Conceit

Muse is a 2013 novel by the Canadian author Mary Novik. It is set in 14th century Avignon. The book follows Solange, a fictional character based on Laura de Noves, supposedly (though not in history) the mistress of the Italian poet Francesco Petrarch and the unnamed mother of his children.

Muse is Novik's second book. It was first published in 2013 by Doubleday Canada. An Italian translation, entitled L'amante del Papa, was published by Newton Compton Editori, also in 2013.

== Synopsis ==
The story is narrated by Solange Le Blanc, a young woman who has been raised in a Benedictine nunnery from birth and trained to be a scribe. However, she is also believed to be clairvoyant. The nuns believe that Solange will make their nunnery famous, even though her visions are frequently disturbing and eventually cause her to flee to Avignon, where she tries to find work as a scribe. Through her work as a scribe she meets Petrarch and the two begin a torrid affair.

== Reception ==
Critical reception for Muse has been positive. The Winnipeg Free Press wrote that "As literary fiction, Muse is an illuminating portrait of women struggling to have it all, including lovers, children, fortune and prominence, despite whatever pain they endure." Quill & Quire praised the work, writing "At times, Muse tips into melodrama, but it highlights an intriguing and admirably resilient figure. Solange recognizes and embraces her sins, her weaknesses, and her desire for romantic and carnal love."
