= Handbra =

Covering nipples and areolas with one's hands or arms

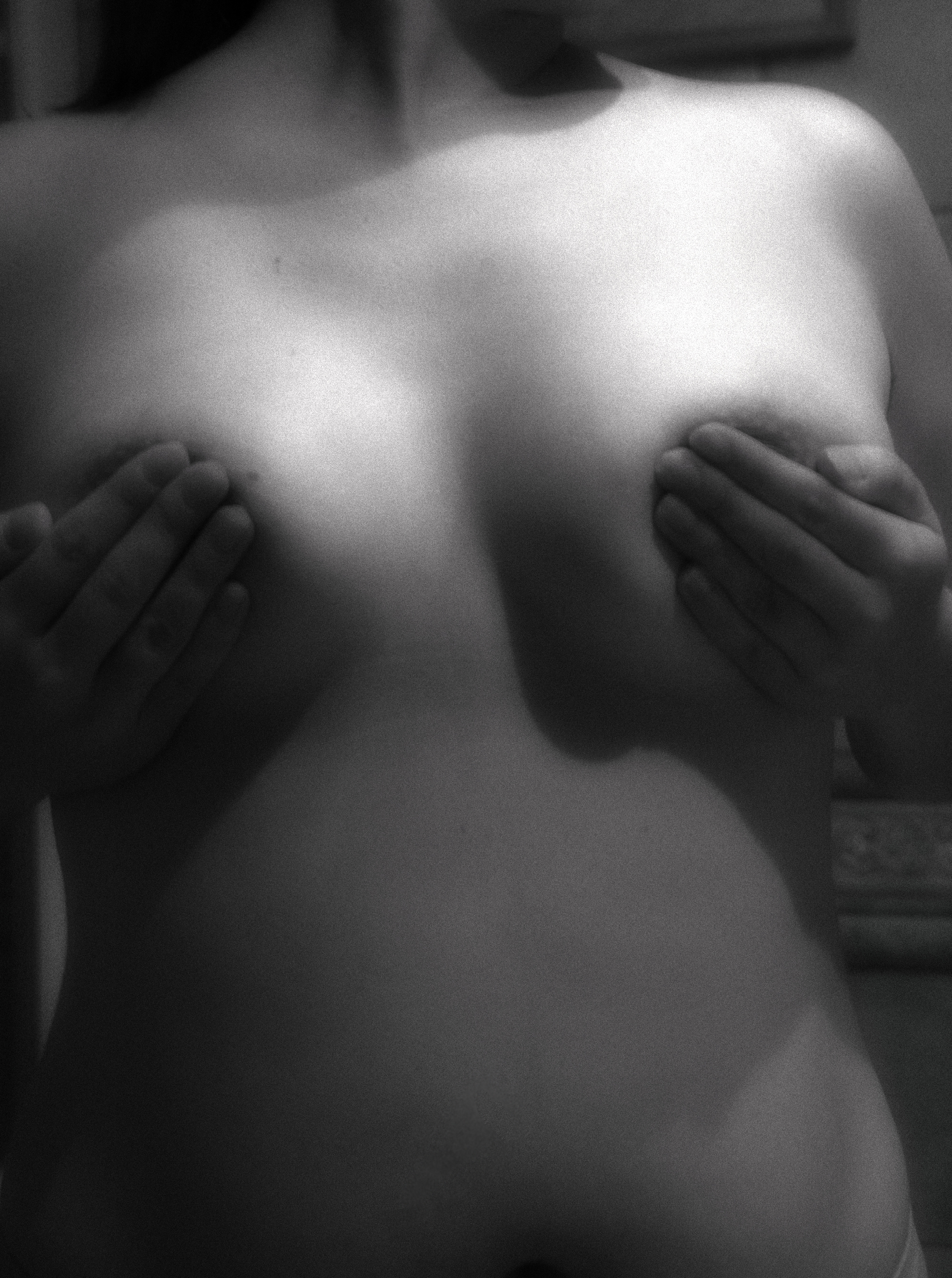
Woman's torso with her hands covering her nipples

A handbra (also hand bra or hand-bra) is the practice of covering female nipples and areolae with hands or arms. It often is done in compliance with censors' guidelines, public authorities and community standards when female breasts are required to be covered in film or other media. If the arms are used instead of the hands the expression is arm bra. The use of long hair for this purpose is called a hair bra. Moreover, a handbra may also be used by women to cover their breasts to maintain their modesty, when they find themselves with their breasts uncovered in front of others.

Social conventions requiring females to cover all or part of their breasts in public have been widespread throughout history and across cultures. Contemporary Western cultures usually regard the exposure of the nipples and areolae as immodest, and sometimes prosecute it as indecent exposure. Covering them, as with pasties, is often sufficient to avoid legal sanction.

== In art ==
Employment of the handbra technique and its variations has a long history in art.

Judean pillar figures, from the Southern Levant (modern day Israel, Jordan, and Palestine) show a nude goddess, supporting or cupping her prominent breasts with her hands.

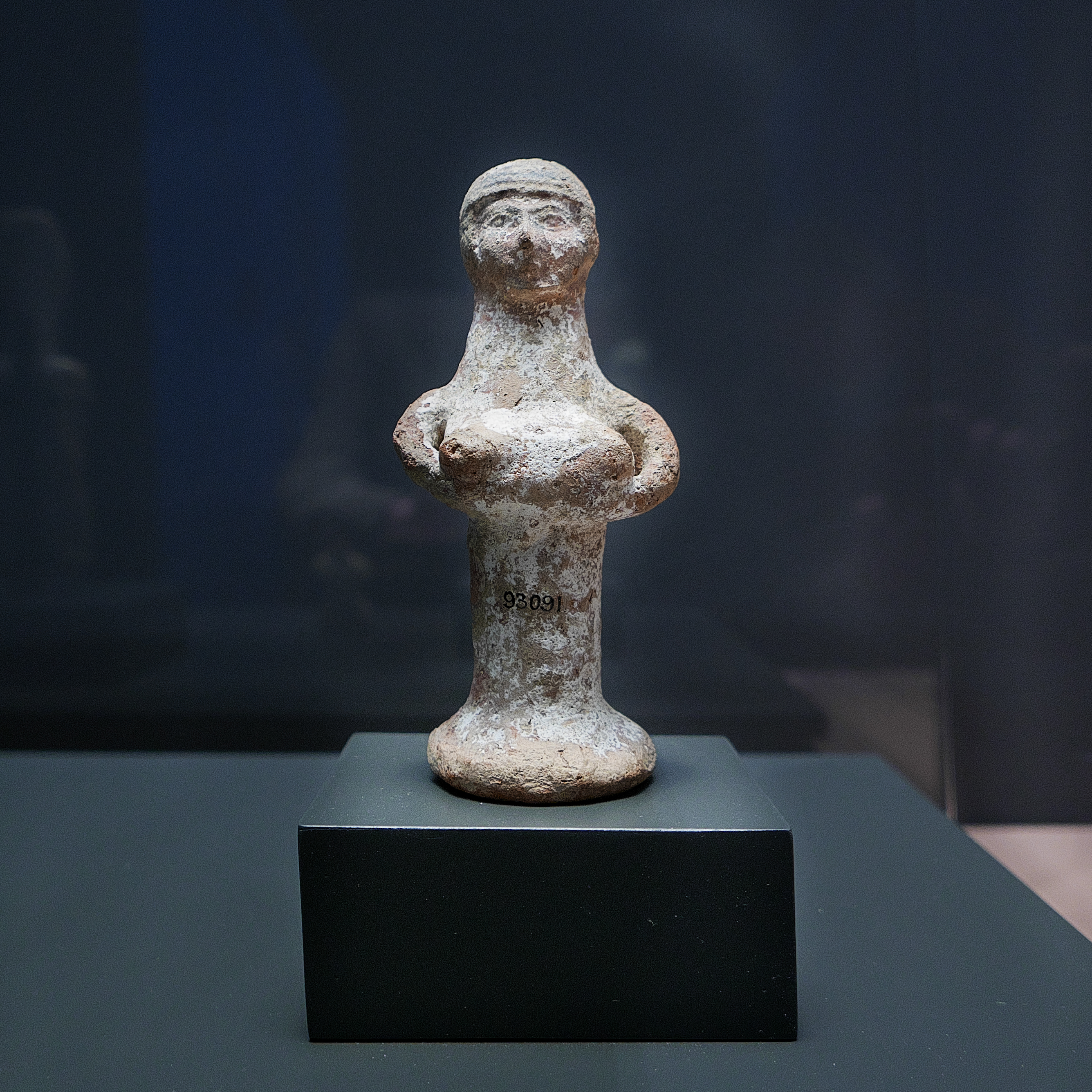
A baked clay figure (7th century B.C.) from Bethlehem

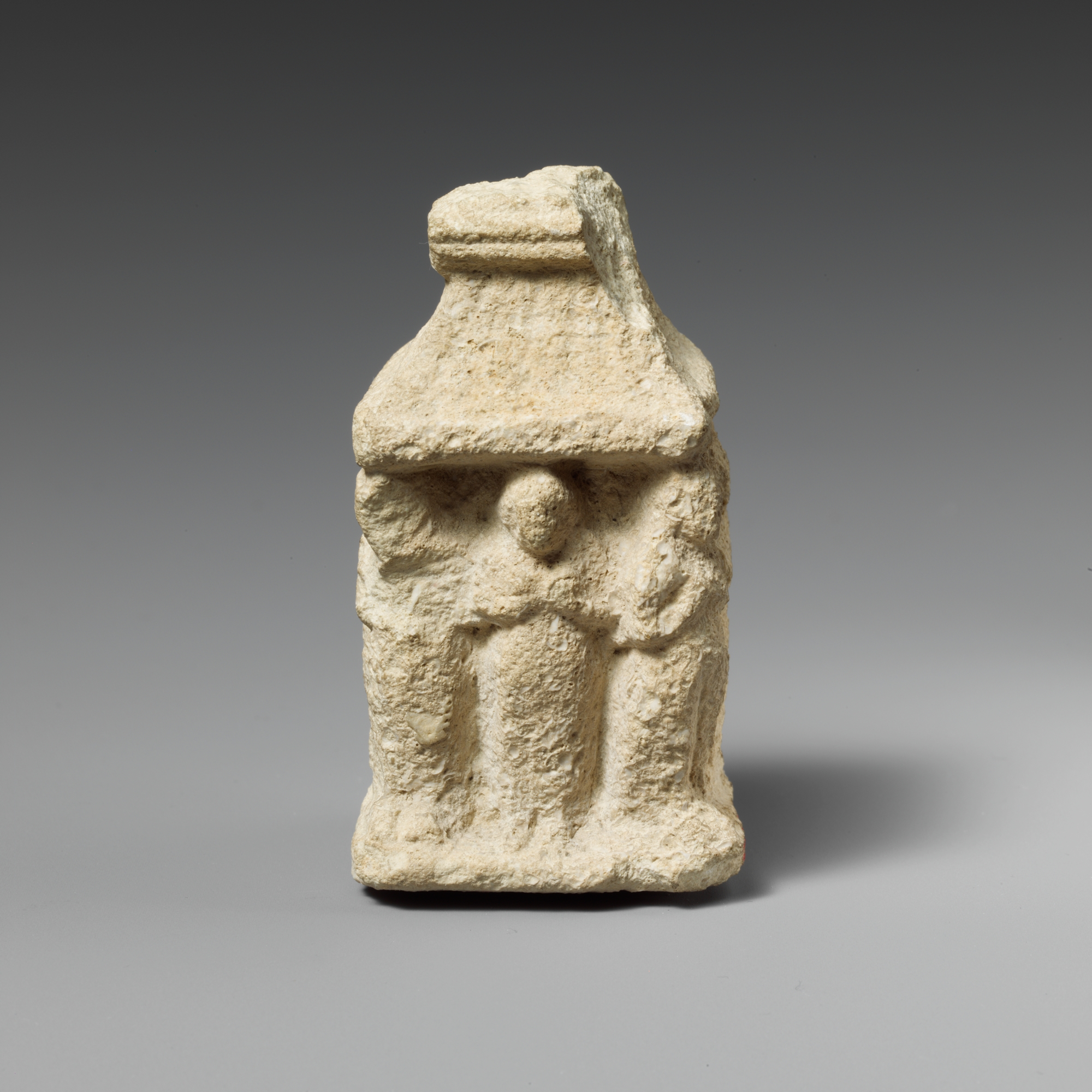
A complex Cypriot figure (5th century B.C.)

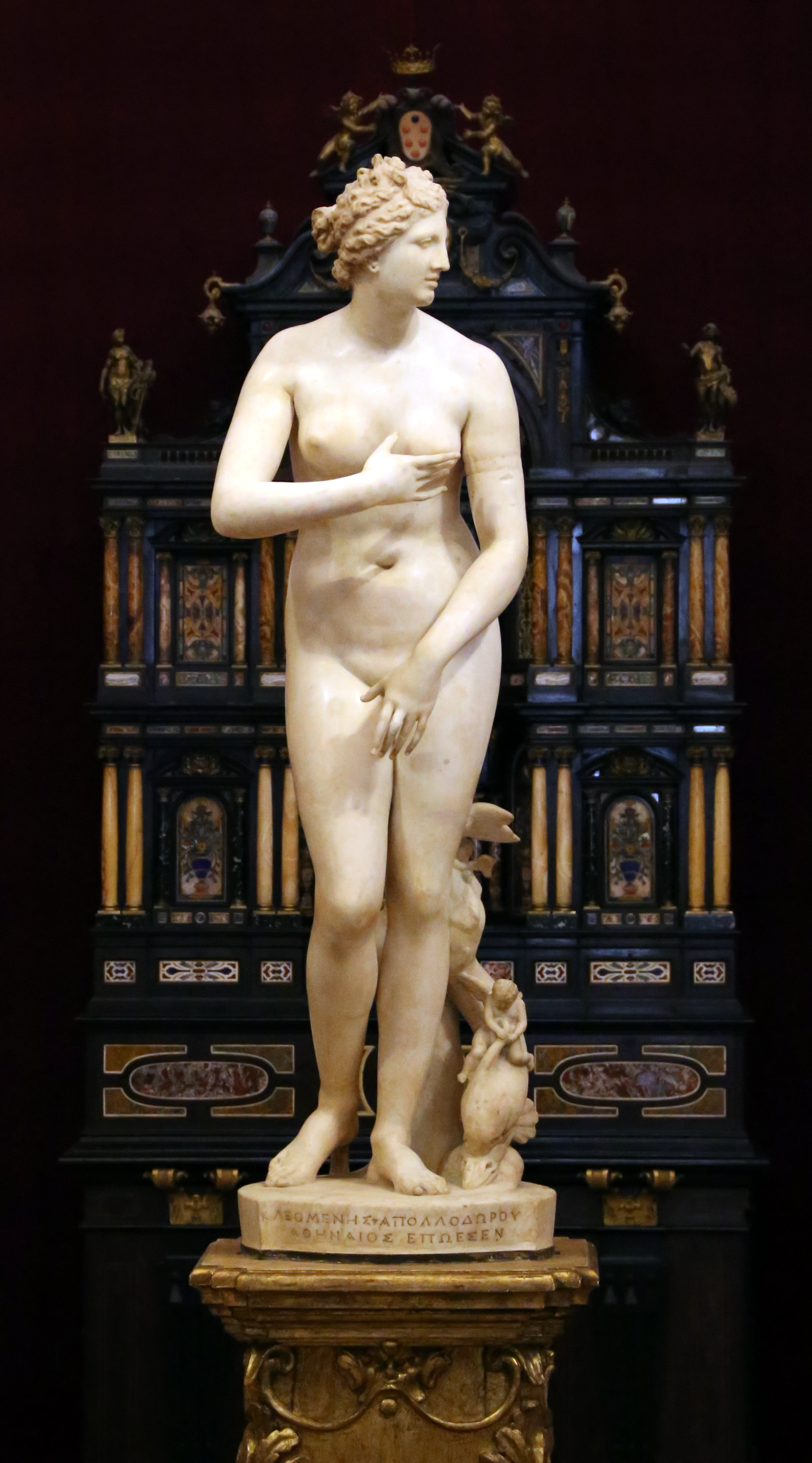
The Medici Venus (1st century B.C.)

A caryatid in front of the Jean-Baptiste de La Salle hotel (16th century) in Reim, Marne, France

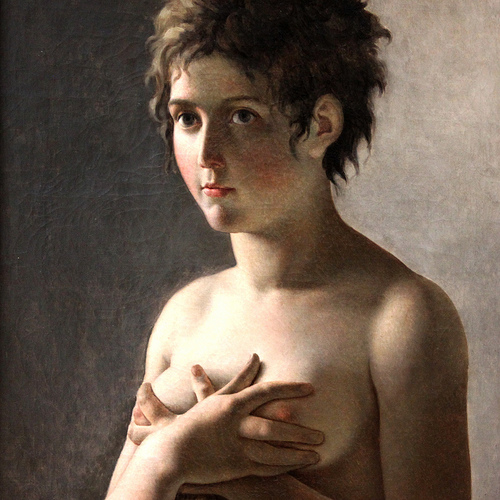
Portrait of a Young Girl (c. 1794) by Pierre-Narcisse Guérin,

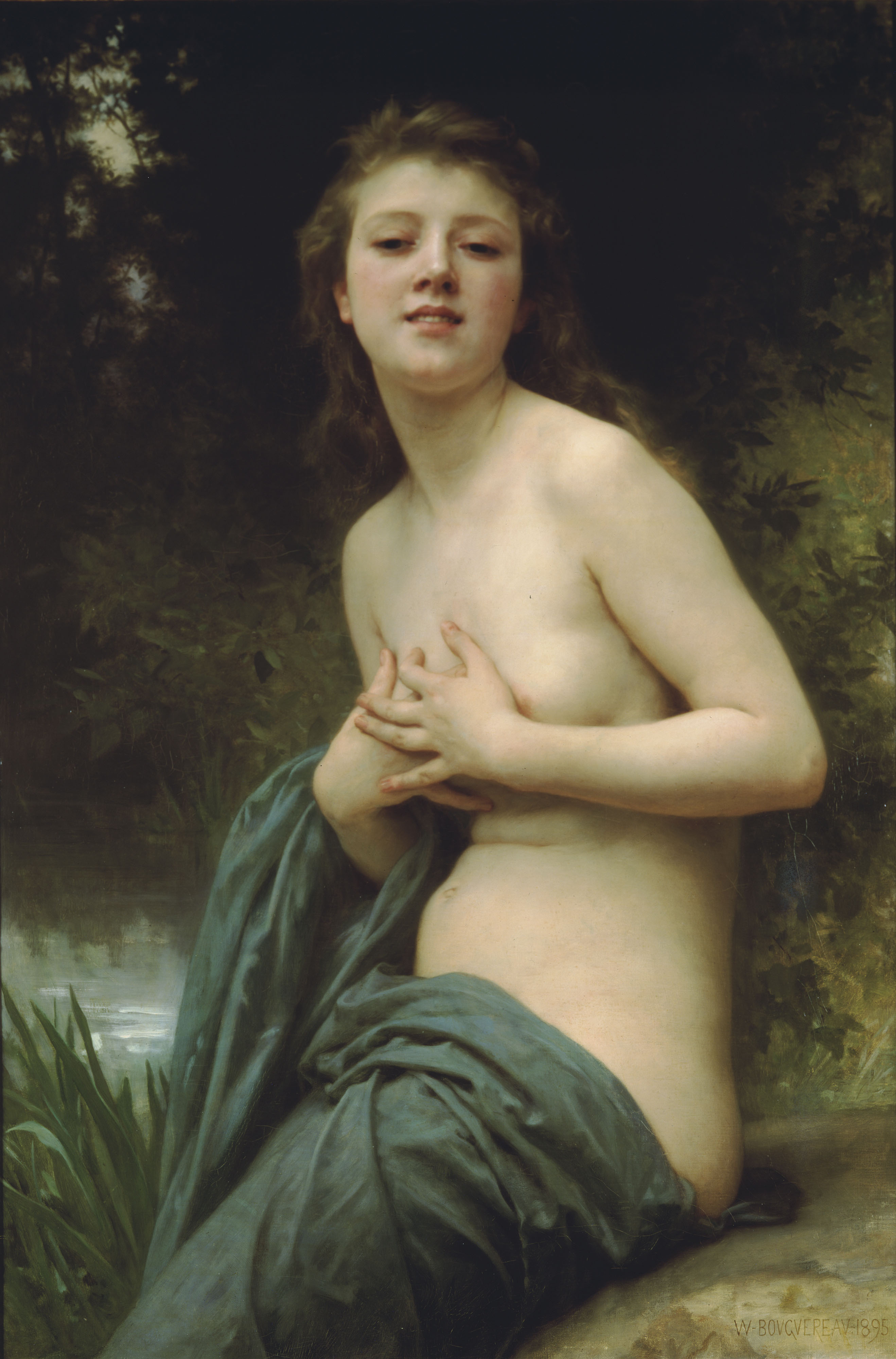
Spring Breeze (1895) by William-Adolphe Bouguereau

The acroterion atop the Saigon Opera House (1900) in modern-day Ho Chi Minh City, Vietnam

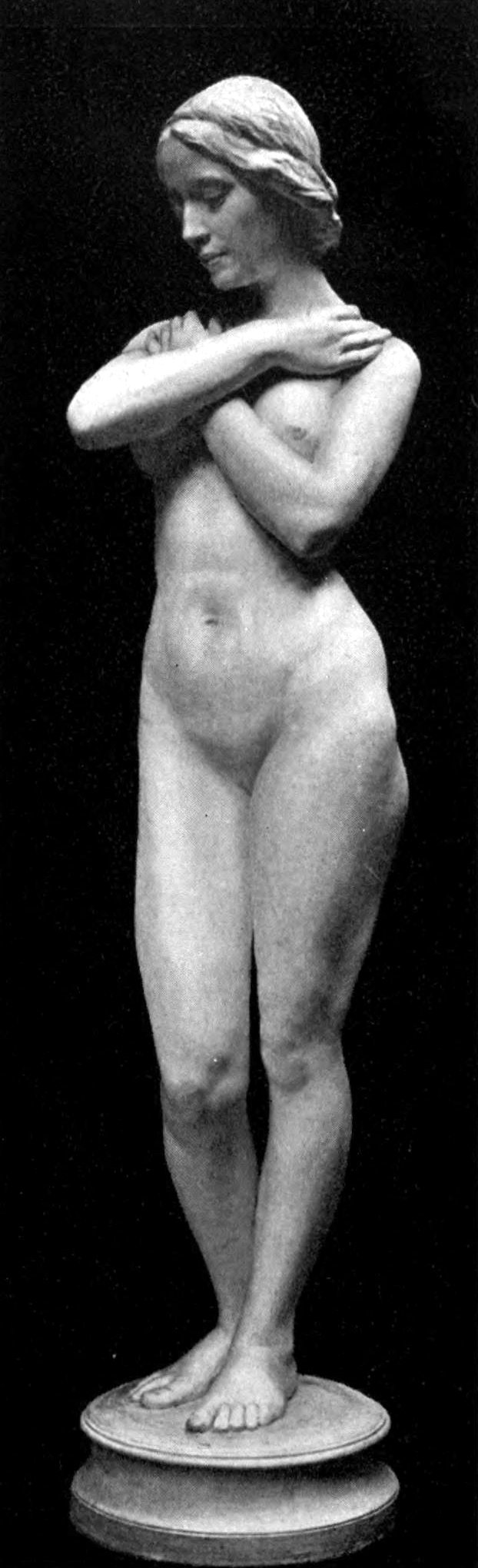
Phryne (early 20th century) by Richard Reginald Goulden

== In print media ==
Similar community standards apply in other media, with female models being required to at least cover their breasts in some way.

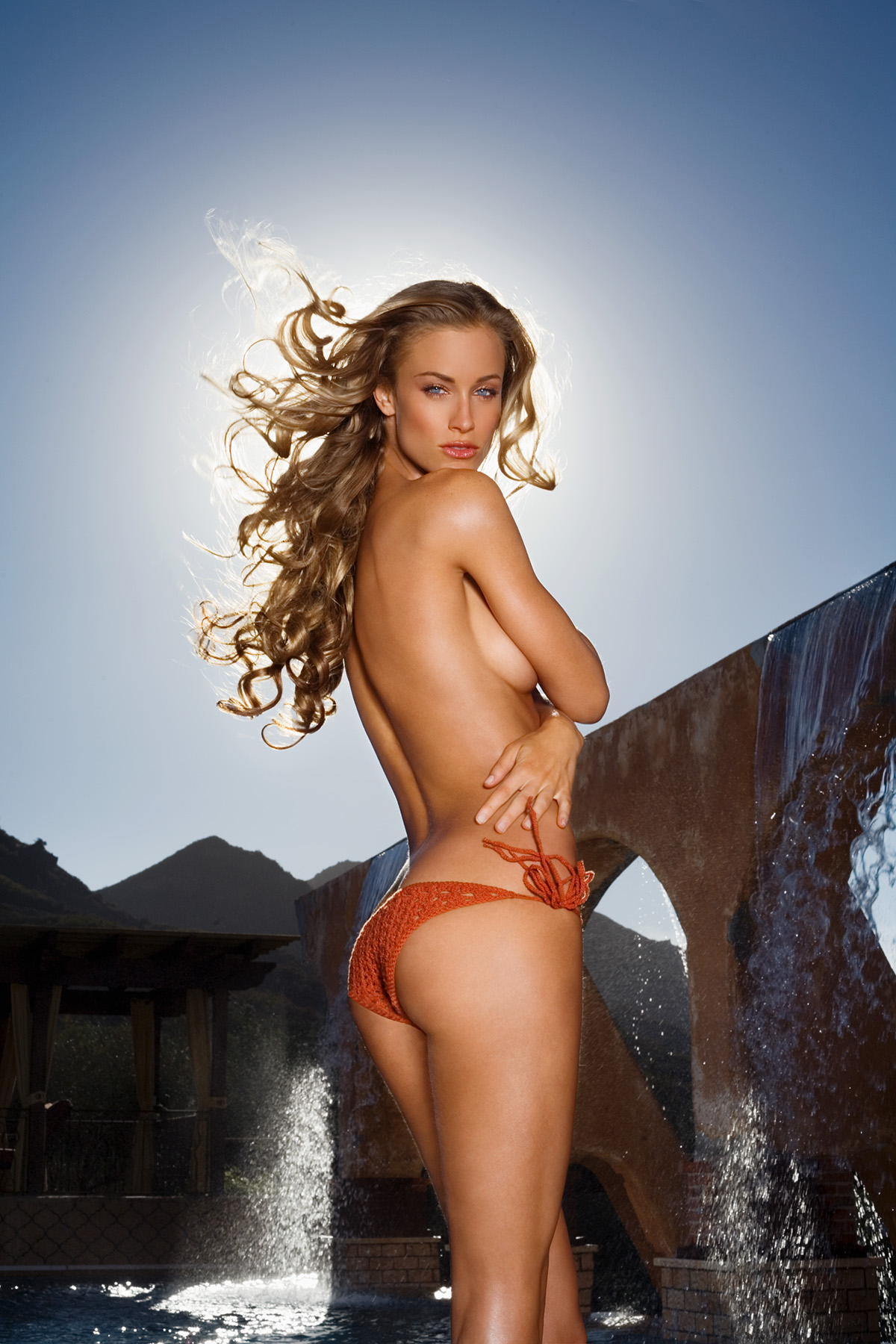
Michele Merkin in 2006

The handbra technique became less common and an unnecessary pose in early 20th century European and American pinup postcard media as toplessness and nudity became more common. In America, after bare breasts become repressed in mainstream media circa 1930, the handbra became an increasingly durable pose, especially as more widespread American pinup literature emerged in the 1950s. Once bare breasts became common in pinup literature, after the early 1960s, the handbra pose became less necessary. As with pinup magazines of the 1950s, the handbra pose was a mainstay of late 20th century mainstream media, especially lad mags, such as FHM, Maxim, and Zoo Weekly, that prominently featured photos of scantily clad actresses and models who wished to avoid topless and nude glamour photography.

Examples include Brigitte Bardot (1955, 1971), Elizabeth Taylor in a Playboy magazine pictorial from the set of Cleopatra, Peggy Moffitt modeling Rudi Gernreich's topless maillot and how Life magazine handled the story (1964), and the emergence of handbras in publications such as the Sports Illustrated Swimsuit Issue by model Elle MacPherson (1989).

Toward the end of the 20th century, the handbra appeared on numerous celebrity magazine covers. The August 1991 cover of Vanity Fair magazine, known as the More Demi Moore cover, contained a controversial handbra nude photograph of the then seven-months pregnant Demi Moore taken by Annie Leibovitz. Two years later Janet Jackson appeared on the September 1993 cover of Rolling Stone with her nipples covered by a pair of male hands. The magazine later named it their "Most Popular Cover Ever".

In July 1994, Ronald Reagan's daughter Patti Davis appeared on the cover of Playboy with another model covering her breasts. Photographer Raphael Mazzucco created an eight-woman handbra on the cover of the 2006 Sports Illustrated Swimsuit Issue and a photo of Marisa Miller covering her breasts with her arms and her vulva with an iPod in the 2007 Swimsuit Issue.

The handbra was the subject of a pointed parody advertisement for Holding Your Own Boobs magazine performed by Sarah Michelle Gellar and Will Ferrell on the May 15, 1999 episode of Saturday Night Live.

== In cinema ==
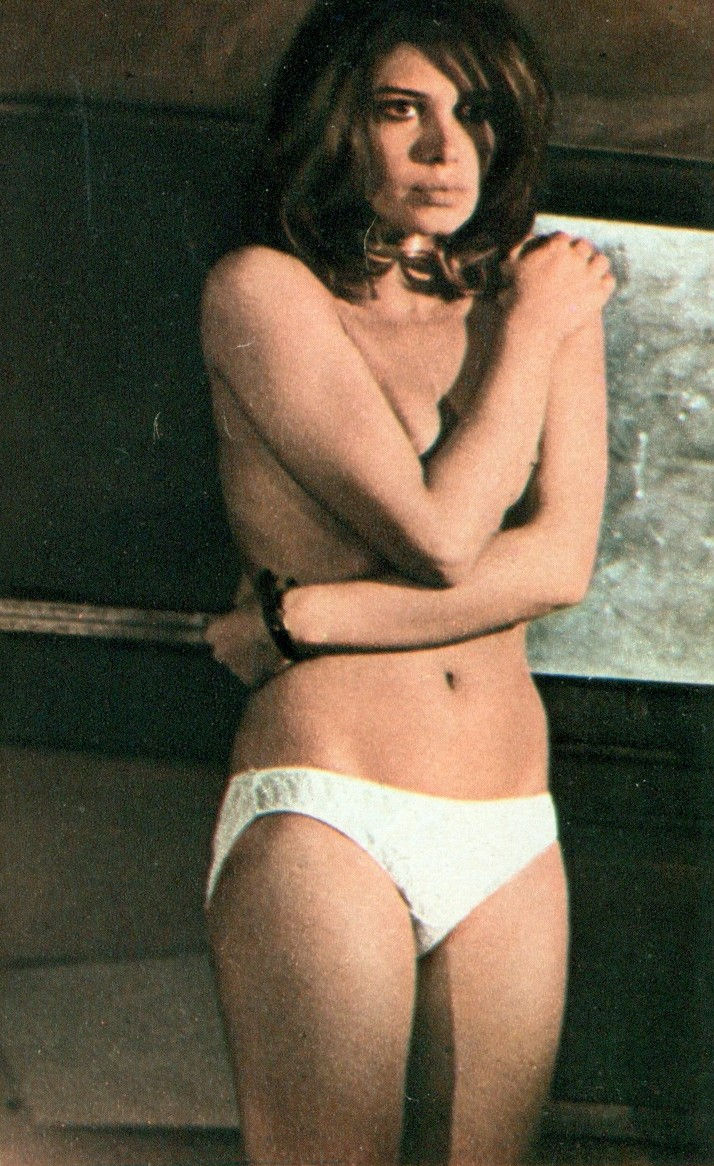
Actress Laura Belli on the set of the 1972 Italian crime movie La polizia ringrazia (“Execution Squad”) directed by Stefano Vanzina.

At the start of the 20th century, the use of the handbra was not very common in European or American cinema, where toplessness and discreet full nudity of the female form was accepted. In the 1930s, the Hays Code brought an end to nudity in all its forms, including toplessness, in Hollywood films. To remain within the censors' guidelines or community standards of decency and modesty, breasts of actresses in an otherwise topless scene were required to be covered, especially the nipples and areolae, with their hands (using a handbra gesture), arms, towel, pasties, some other object, or the angle of the body in relation to the camera.

Social upheaval in the 1960s resulted first in toplessness then full nudity in film being accepted (albeit subject to movie ratings in many countries), after which the use of the handbra decreased. It has, however, not disappeared, remaining a concession to modesty in "PG" pictures.

== On the Internet ==
In 2014 Playboy Enterprises made its Playboy.com website content "safe for work" by covering nipples with handbras and armbras.

== Other uses ==
A brassiere called the "handbra" has a pair of hands parodying the technique. Lady Gaga wore one in the music video for her 2013 single "Applause".

== See also ==
- Depictions of nudity
- Glamour photography
- Toplessness
