= Portrait of a Young Girl (Guérin) =

Painting by Pierre-Narcisse Guérin

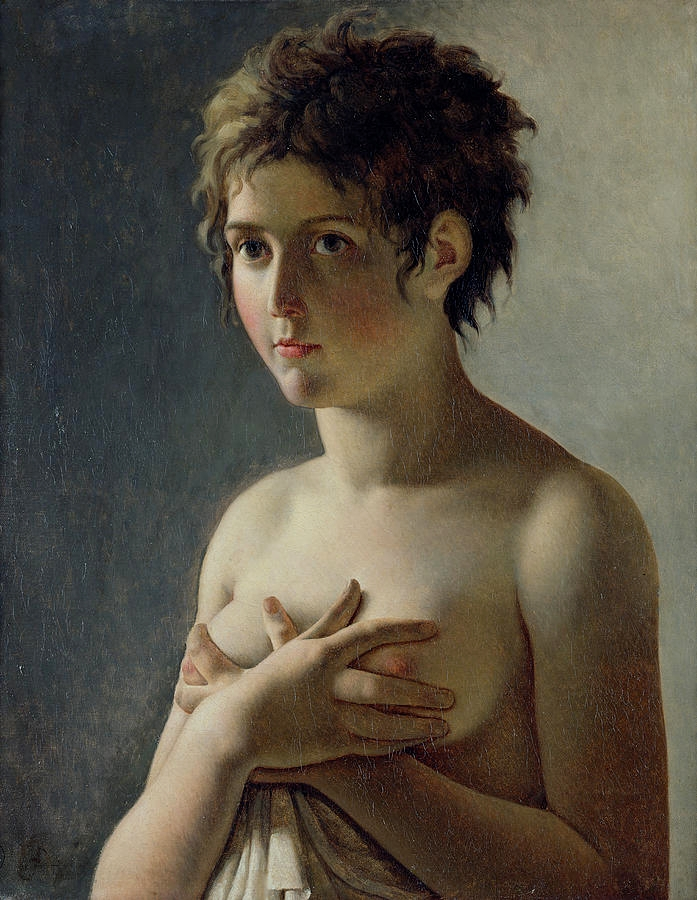
- Artist: Pierre-Narcisse Guérin
- Year: 1794
- Medium: Oil on canvas
- Dimensions: 60 cm × 50 cm (24 in × 20 in)
- Location: Louvre; Paris

Portrait of a Young Girl (French: Jeune fille en buste) is an oil on canvas painting by Pierre-Narcisse Guérin, from in 1794. It is held at the Louvre, in Paris.

== Background ==
One of Guérin's early works, the painting treats the subject in a frank and direct way. It is a portrait of a young girl, depicted while she covers her breasts with both hands, while still exposing her nipples. She looks to her side, with an indifferent look, as though she were posing. The smooth background, simplicity of the design and the use of the measured color are characteristic of the neo-classical style and of the school of Jean-Baptiste Regnault and Jacques-Louis David. The work was acquired by the Louvre in 1978.

The girl's short hair is inspired by the Titus cut (French: coiffure à la Titus), popular in France at the time and based on the hairstyle of the Roman era. In fact, the work is one of the first paintings to depict this hairstyle. The style may have taken its name from Titus Junius Brutus, son of the Roman politician Lucius Junius Brutus.

== Cultural references ==
Mary Novik's debut novel, Conceit used the image for the cover of the book’s original 2007 publication.
