= Portrait of Henri de la Rochejaquelein =

Painting by Pierre-Narcisse Guérin

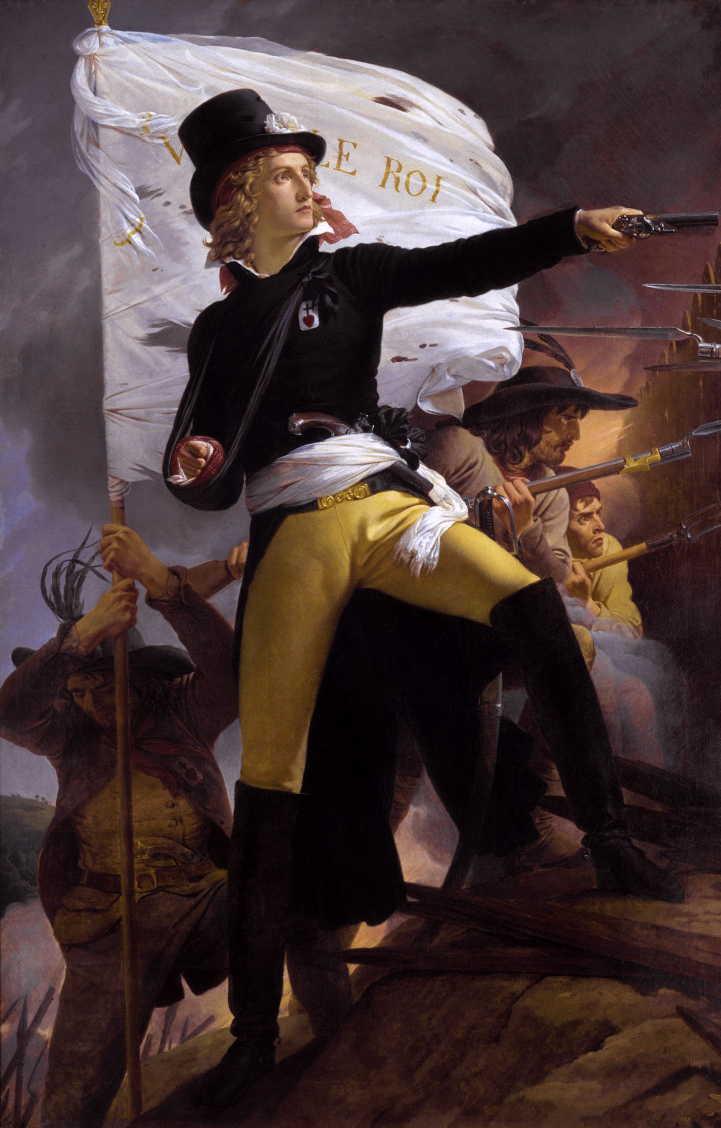
- Artist: Pierre-Narcisse Guérin
- Year: 1816
- Type: Oil on canvas, portrait painting
- Dimensions: 216 cm × 142 cm (85 in × 56 in)
- Location: Musée d'Art et d'Histoire de Cholet; Cholet

Portrait of Henri de la Rochejaquelein is an oil on canvas portrait painting by the French artist Pierre-Narcisse Guérin, from 1816.

== History and description ==
It is a posthumous portrait of Henri de la Rochejaquelein, a leader of Royalist forces at the War in the Vendée, who had been killed in 1794 at the age of 21. He is shown leading troops in action with the Royalist banner held by a supporter behind him. He wears the Sacré Coeur on his lapel. He holds a pistol on his hand and seems about to shoot. At the right two Royalist soldier appear with their bayonets.

The work was commissioned for the collection of Louis XVIII at the Château de Saint-Cloud. It was part of a group of paintings commissioned from various artists following the Bourbon Restoration depicting the of Royalist martyrs of the French Revolution. It was exhibited at the Paris Salon of 1817 at the Louvre. Part the collection of the Musée de l'Histoire de France, it is now in the Musée d'Art et d'Histoire de Cholet.

== Bibliography ==
- Eitner, Lorenz. An Outline Of 19th Century European Painting: From David Through Cezanne. Routledge, 2021.
- Jonas, Raymond. France and the Cult of the Sacred Heart: An Epic Tale for Modern Times. University of California Press, 2000.
