= Conceit (novel) =

2007 novel by Mary Novik

- Cover of paperback
- Author: Mary Novik
- Cover artist: Pierre-Narcisse Guérin; C. S. Richardson (design)
- Language: English
- Genre: Novel
- Publisher: Doubleday Canada
- Publication date: 2007
- Publication place: Canada
- Media type: Print (hardcover and paperback) and e-book
- Pages: 402
- ISBN: 978-0-385-66206-2
- OCLC: 192053178

Conceit is a novel by the Canadian author Mary Novik, published in 2007 by Doubleday Canada.

Set in 17th century London, Conceit is the story of Pegge Donne, the daughter of John Donne, a metaphysical poet and contemporary of Shakespeare. Other fictional characters based on historical people are Donne's wife Ann More, the diarist Samuel Pepys, the fisherman Izaak Walton and, appearing briefly, Christopher Wren. Both old and new St Paul's Cathedral (of which Donne was Dean, 1621-1631) and the Great Fire of London in 1666 feature in the novel, which has been praised for bringing London vividly to life. The story is told from the point of view of several characters, including Pegge and her parents. Featured in the narrative are Donne's love poems, his Devotions, and his sermons — in particular, Death's Duel, a sermon the moribund Donne preached to Charles I. The novel also draws upon Izaak Walton's 1640 biography, more myth than history, The Life of Dr John Donne, leading Donne scholar Jeanne Shami to call Conceit a "great novel based on a poor one."

After the clandestine marriage to Ann More that ruined his career, John Donne reportedly said, "John Donne. Ann Donne. Undone." In Novik's novel, Pegge obsesses about their love affair. Piecing together the story she finds in her father's love poems, she identifies with her mother and invents a fiction about their lives. When her father tries to place his two sons in careers and arrange marriages for his five daughters, Pegge defies him, seeking a passion to equal his.

== Title ==
The title of Novik's novel, Conceit, alludes to both the vanity of her fictionalized John Donne and the conceit, a literary device used by the metaphysical poets. The metaphysical conceit is a far-fetched comparison, as when Donne, in his poem "A Valediction: Forbidding Mourning", compares two separated lovers to a geometry compass with its legs roaming apart. Several critics, including Edward O'Connor and Gudrun Will, have pointed out that Novik's novel is itself a conceit, "in the best literary sense of the word". The cover art is taken from Pierre-Narcisse Guérin's work, Jeune fille en buste.

== Response ==
Conceit was chosen as a Book of the Year by both The Globe and Mail and Quill & Quire. Canada Reads named Conceit one of the Top 40 Essential Canadian Novels of the Decade.

== Awards and nominations ==
Year	Award	Category	Result	Ref
2007	Scotiabank Giller Prize	—	Longlisted	
2008	Ethel Wilson Fiction Prize	—	Won	
