= The Death of Brutus =

Painting by Pierre-Narcisse Guérin

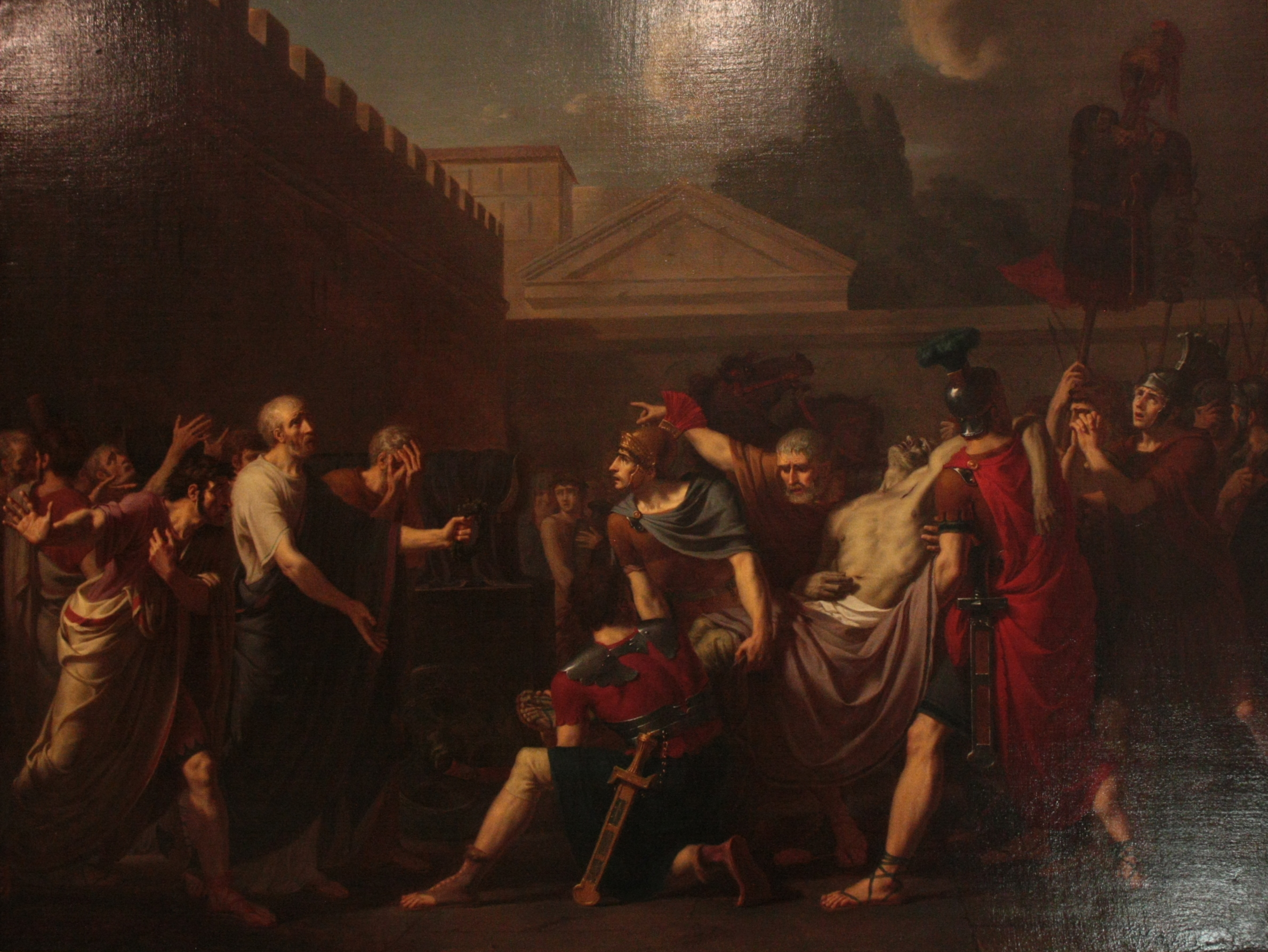
- Artist: Pierre-Narcisse Guérin
- Year: 1793
- Type: Oil on canvas, history painting
- Location: Musée de la Révolution française; Vizille

The Death of Brutus (French: La Mort de Brutus) is a 1793 neoclassical history painting by the French artist Pierre-Narcisse Guérin. It depicts the corpse Marcus Junius Brutus, of the leaders of the assassination of Julius Caesar, being carried aloft following his suicide after the defeat at the Battle of Philippi. It marked Guérin's first entry into the Prix de Rome. It was one of a number of paintings in the decade after the French Revolution featuring violated or vulnerable bodies, which looked back to the styles of the Ancien Régime. Today it is in the Musée de la Révolution française in Vizille.

== Bibliography ==
- Achinstein, Sharon & Sauer, Elizabeth. Milton & Toleration. OUP Oxford, 2007.
- Graybill, Lela. The Visual Culture of Violence After the French Revolution. Routledge, 2016.
- Ives, Colta Feller & Barker, Elizabeth E. Romanticism & the School of Nature. Metropolitan Museum of Art, 2000.
