= Titus cut =

Hairstyle

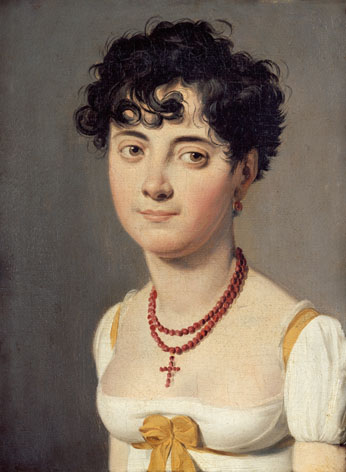
Portrait of Henriette Victoire Elisabeth d’Avrange (circa 1810)

A Titus cut or coiffure à la Titus, also known as coiffure à la victime (Haircut of the Victim), was a hairstyle for men and women popular at the end of the 18th century in France and England. The style consisted of a short layered cut, typically with curls. It was supposedly popularized in 1791 by the French actor François-Joseph Talma who played Titus in a Parisian production of Voltaire's Brutus.

The Titus cut was considered a radical departure from the large elaborate hairstyles and wigs that were popular during the last quarter of the 18th century. As a simple "classical" style, free from aristocratic excess, it was associated with the French Revolution and popular among those who supported it. Although initially a men's style, it was soon adopted by women as well. The Journal de Paris reported in 1802 that "more than half of elegant women were wearing their hair or wig à la Titus." The style spread to England as well, where it was often called coiffure à la guillotine in reference to the beheadings of the French Revolution. Although the style remained popular into the 19th century, by the 1810s it had fallen out of fashion.

== Gallery ==
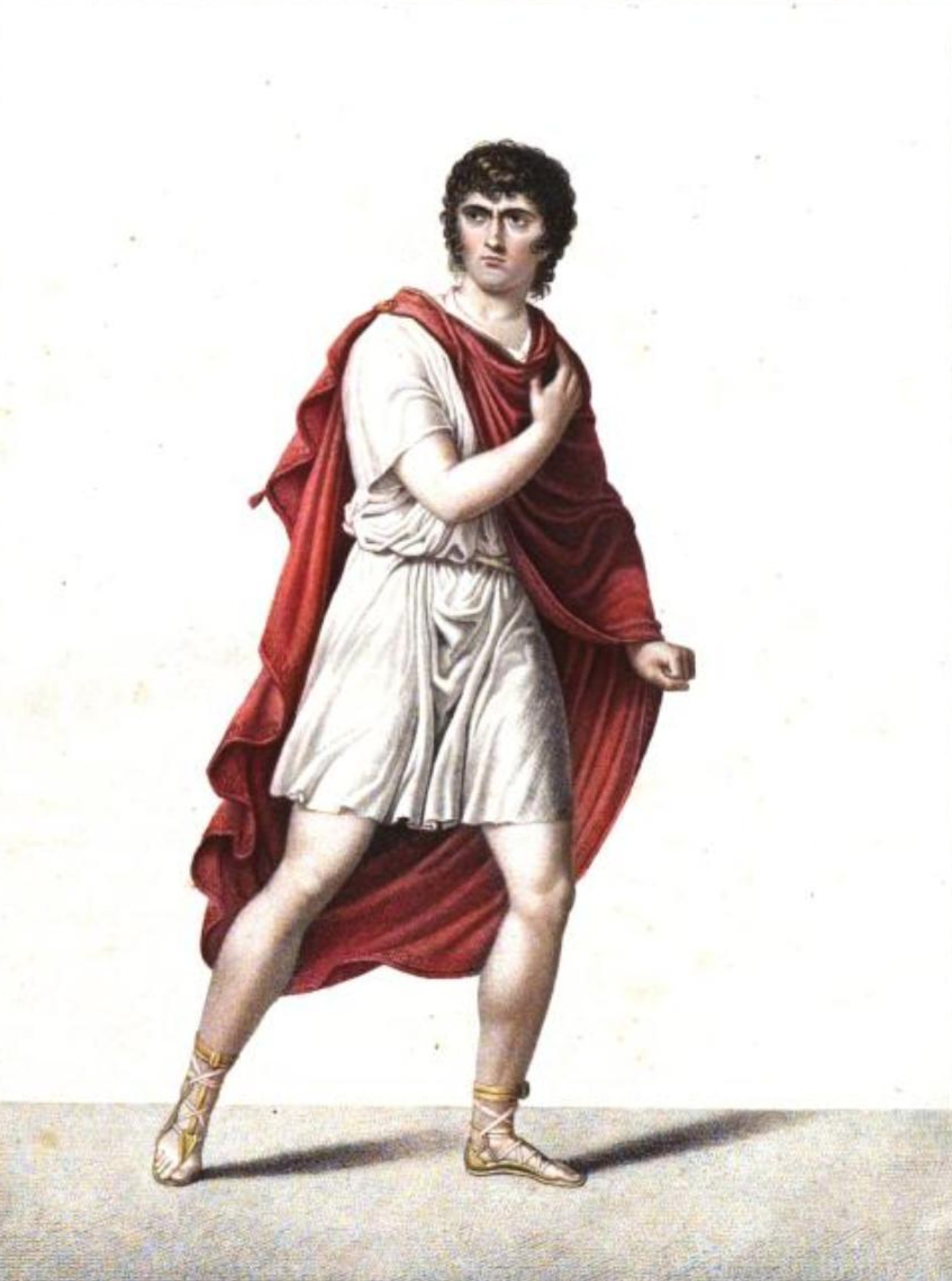
François-Joseph Talma playing the role of Titus in Voltaire's Brutus

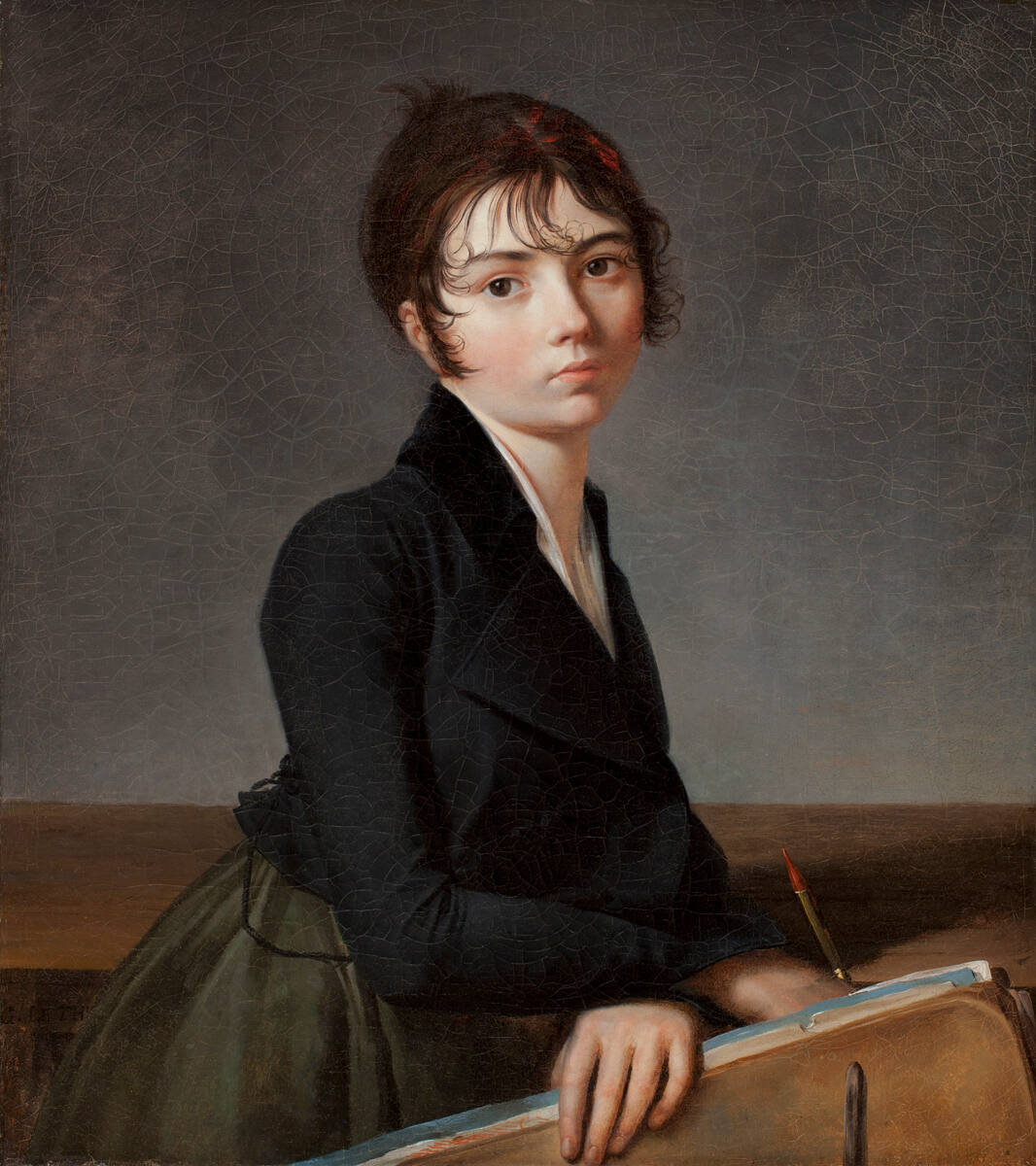
Girl with Portfolio (circa 1799)

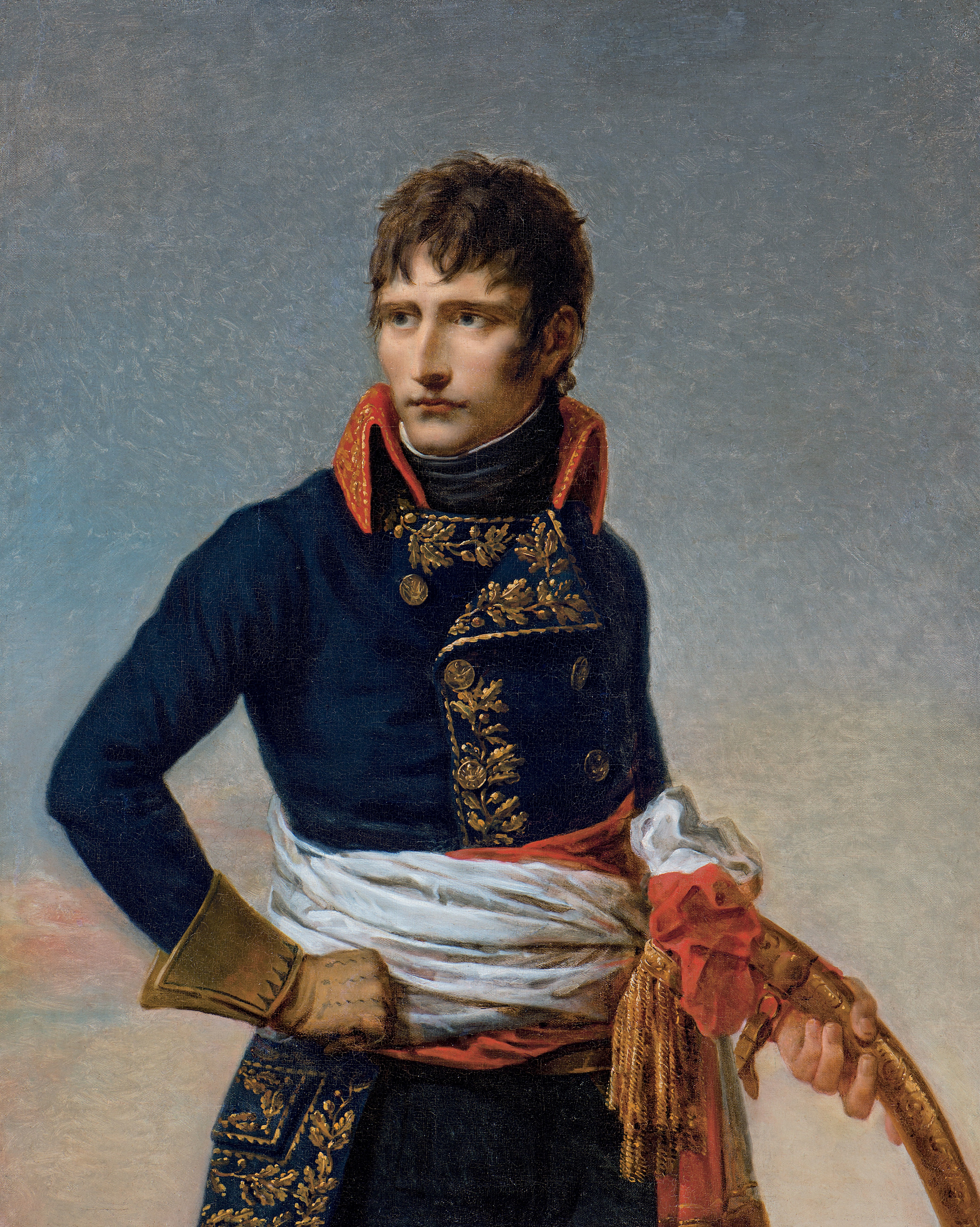
Portrait of Napoleon Bonaparte (1800)

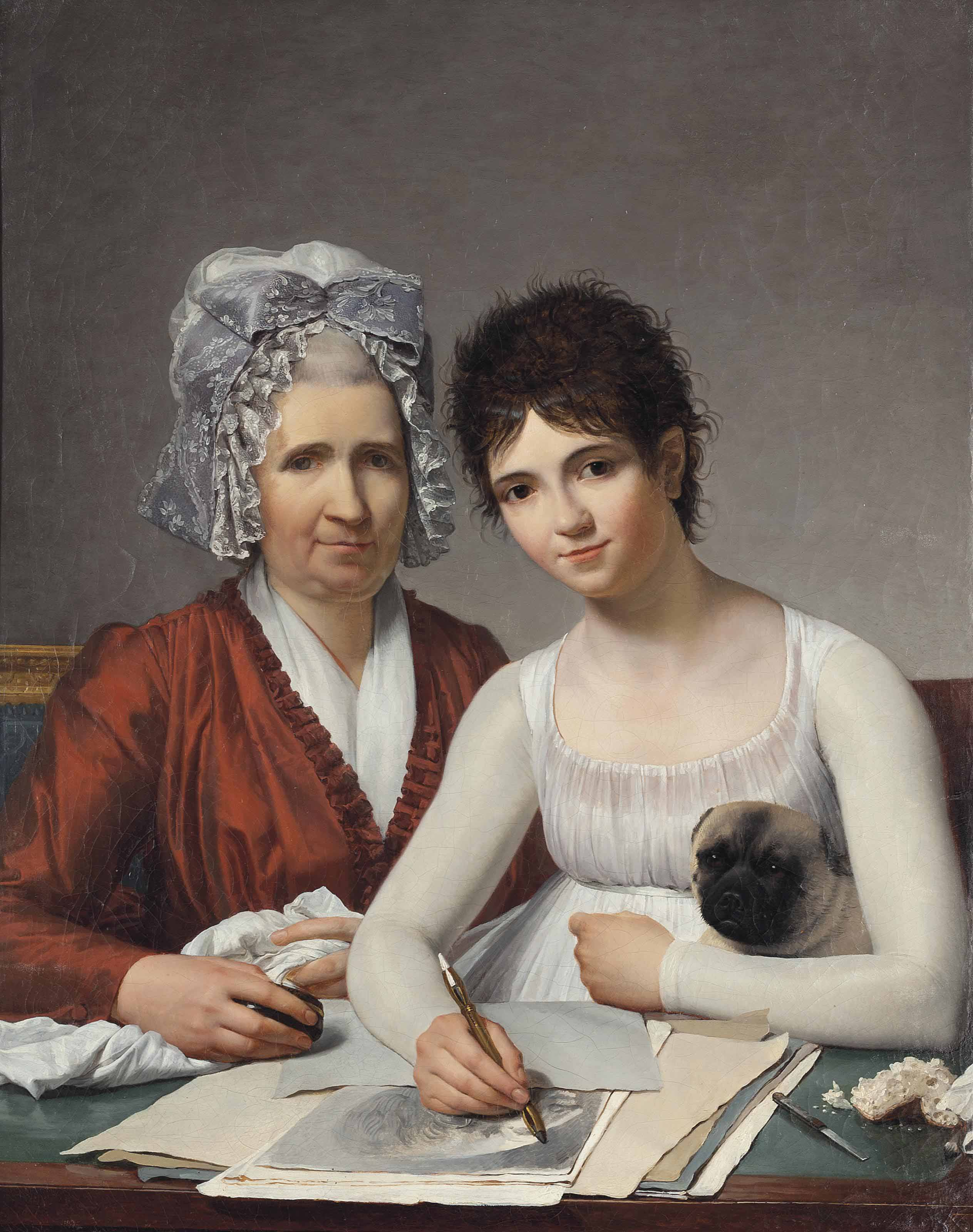
Portrait of Marie-Adrienne Rousseau and Rose-Marie Charlotte (early 1800s)

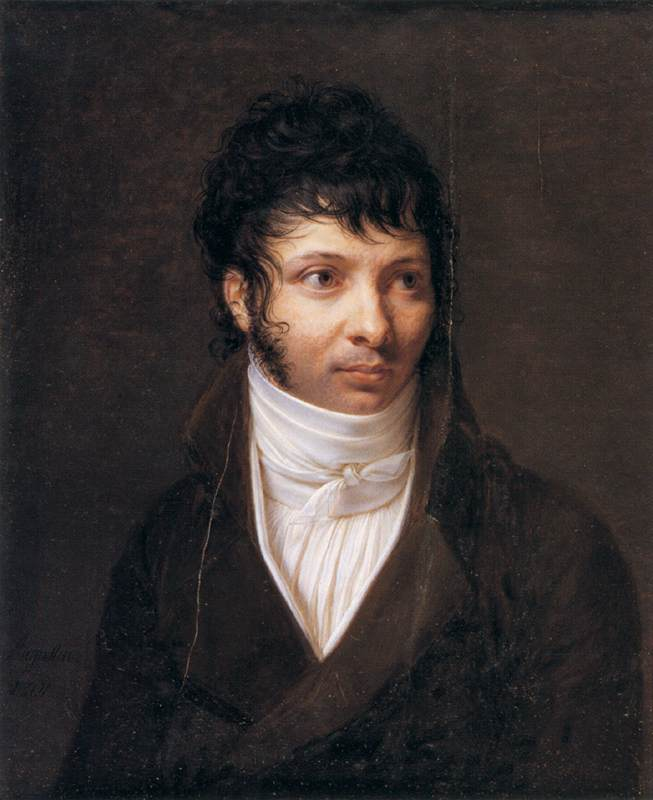
Portrait of Charles Antoine Callamard (1801)

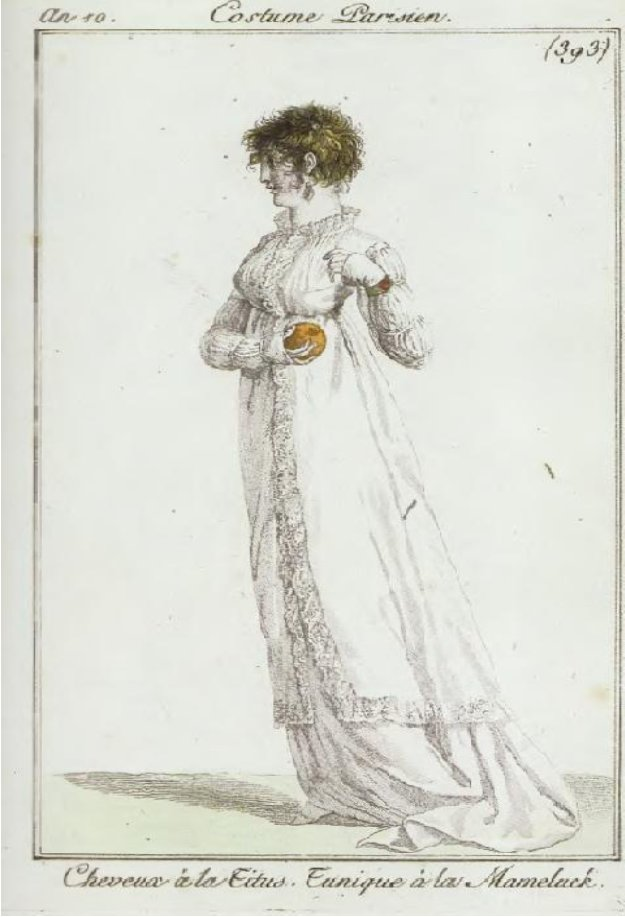
"Cheveux à la Titus", fashion print from Costume Parisien (1803)

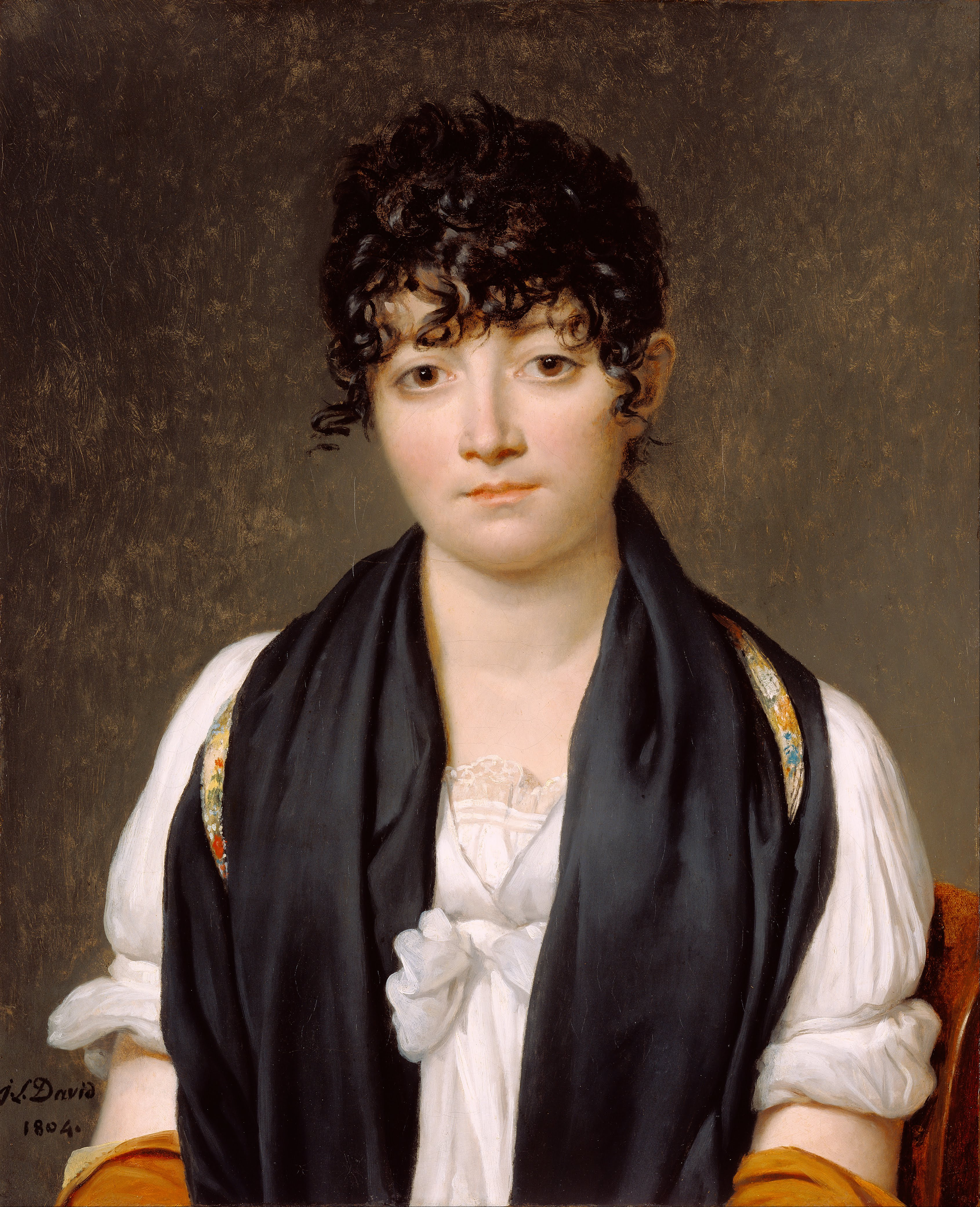
Portrait of Suzanne le Peletier de Saint-Fargeau (1804)

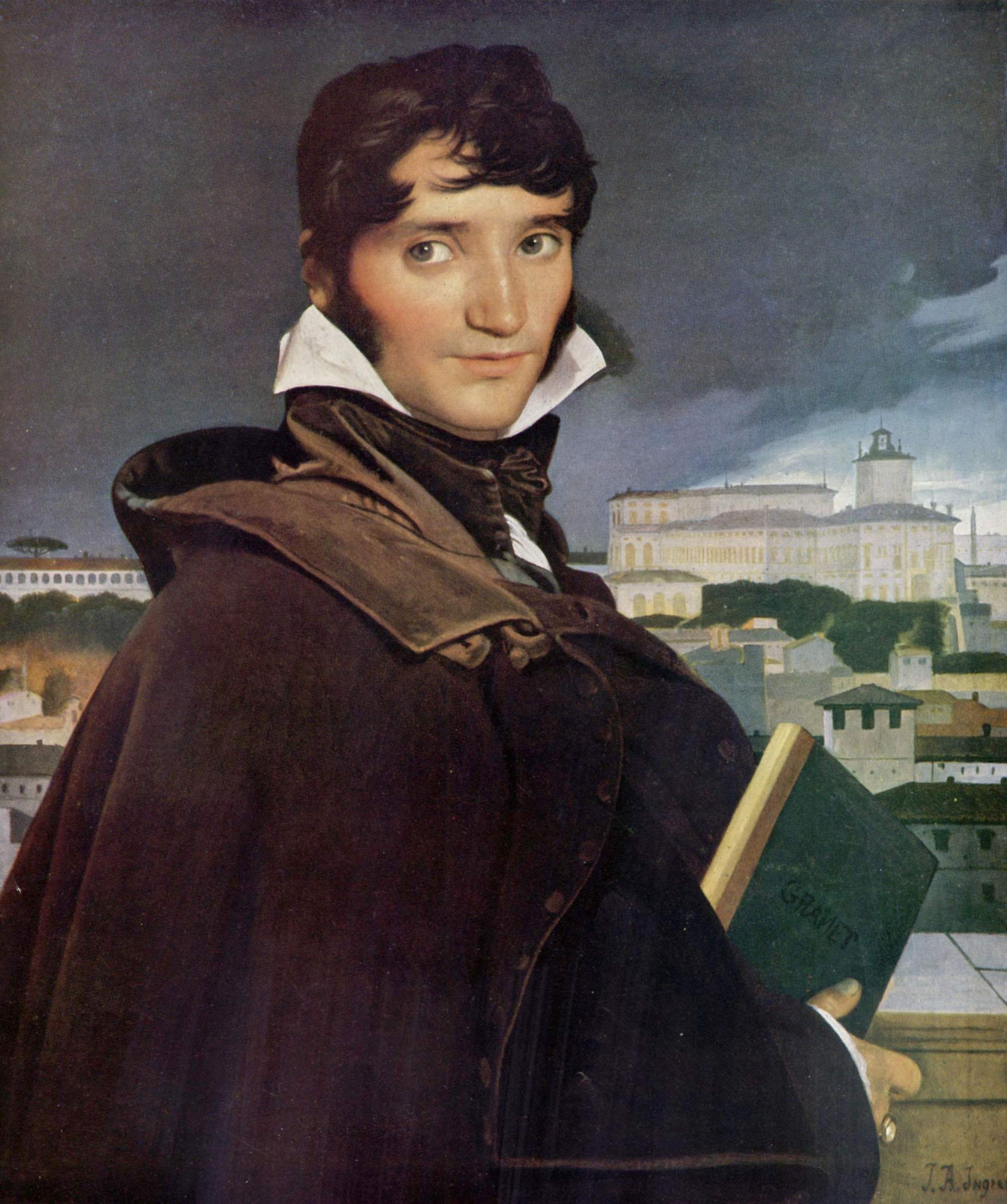
Portrait of François Marius Granet (1807)

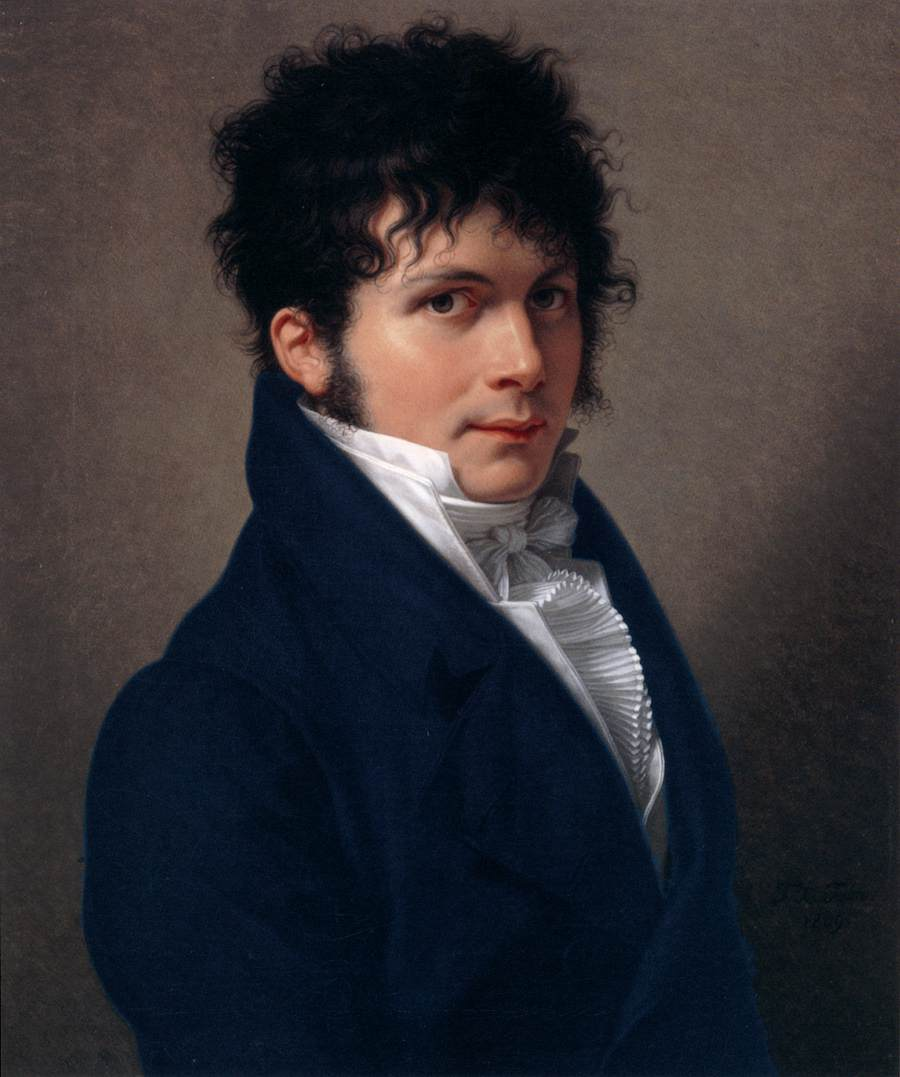
Portrait of a Man (1809)

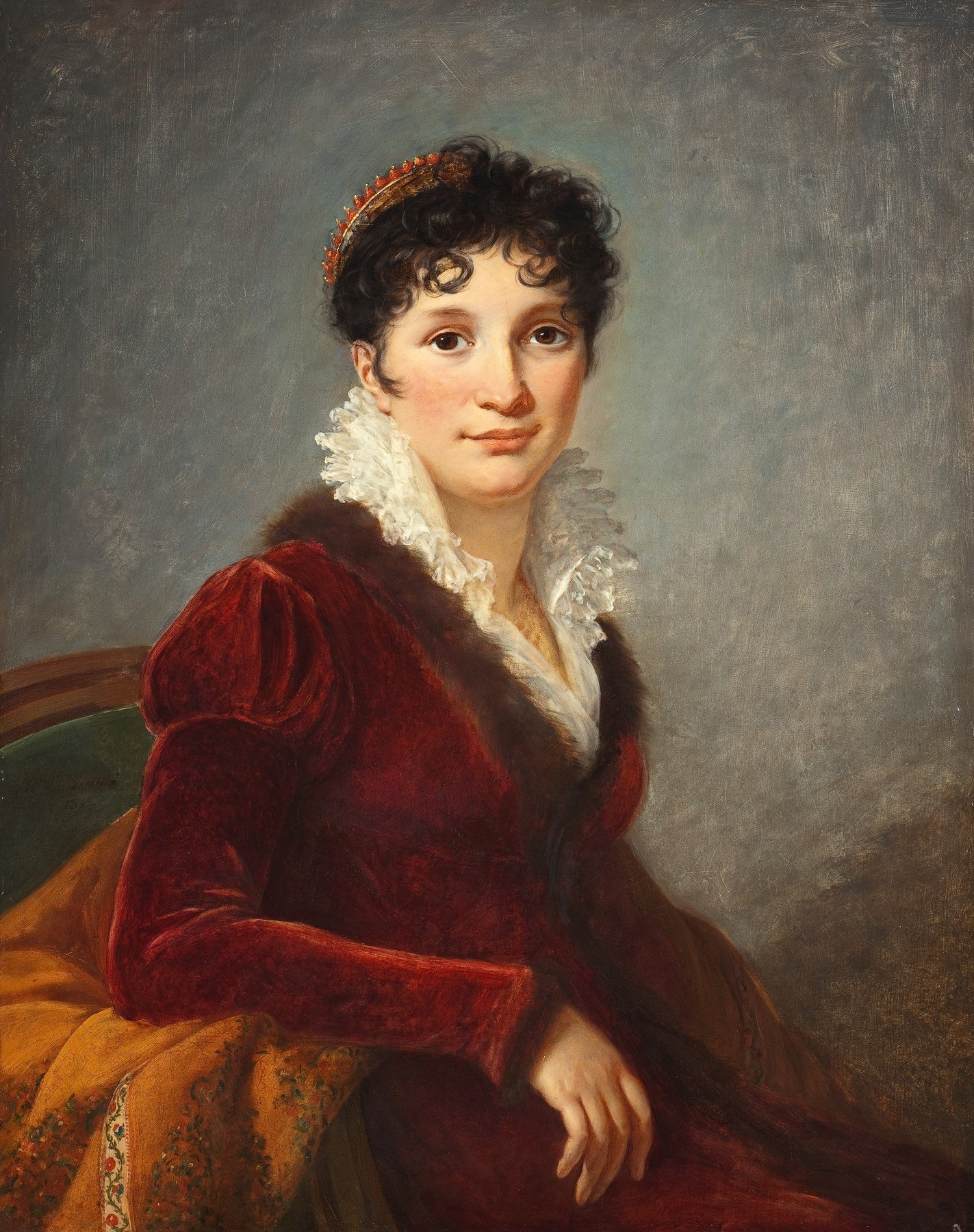
Portrait of Fanny Biron of Courland (1810)

== See also ==
- Portrait of a Young Girl (Guérin)
- List of hairstyles
