= Aurora and Cephalus (Guérin) =

1811 painting by Pierre-Narcisse Guerin

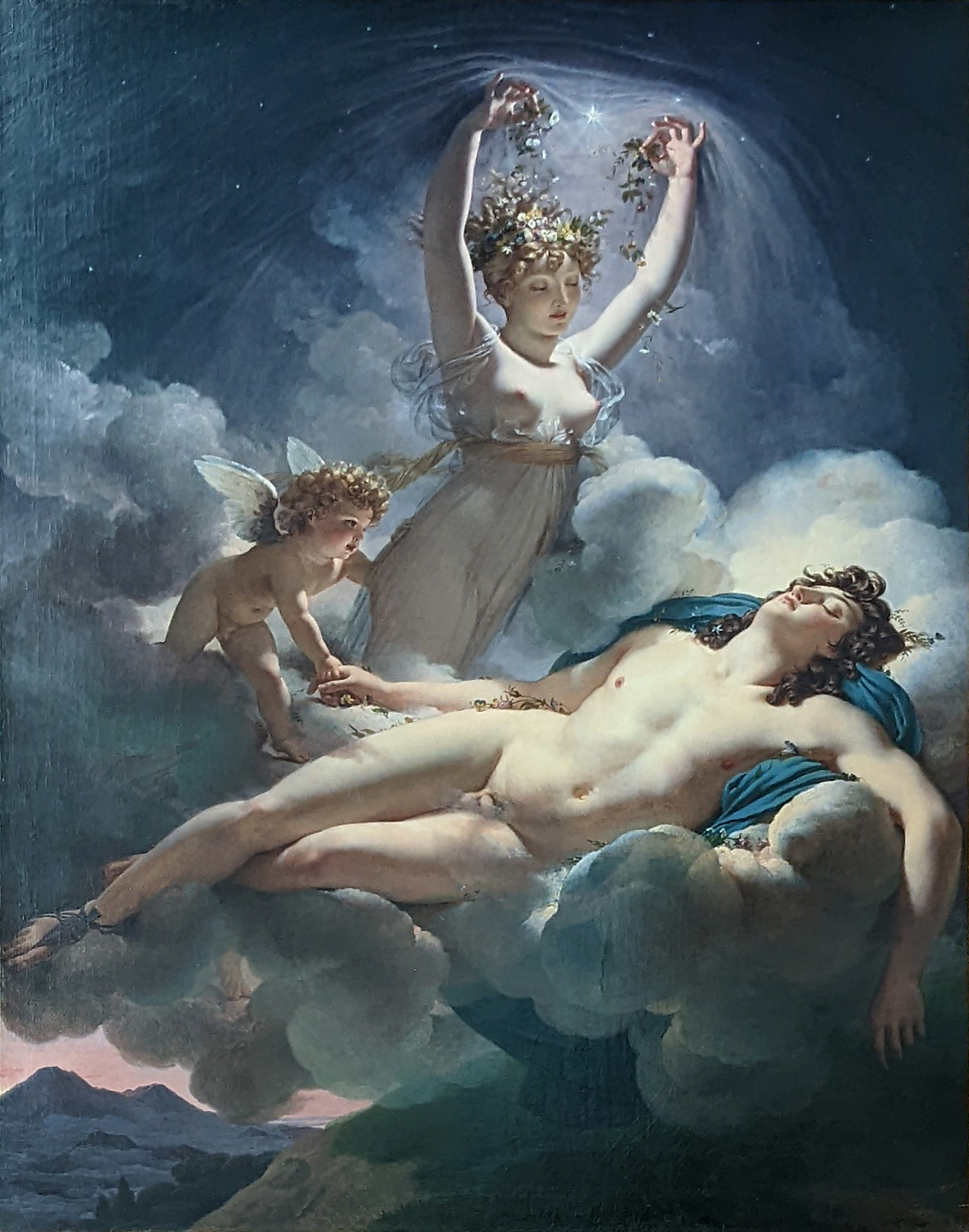
- Artist: Pierre-Narcisse Guérin
- Year: 1810
- Type: Oil on canvas
- Dimensions: 254.5 cm × 178 cm (100.2 in × 70 in)
- Location: Louvre, Paris

Aurora and Cephalus is an oil on canvas painting by the French artist Pierre-Narcisse Guérin, from 1810. The canvas depicts verses 661 to 866 of Book VII of Ovid's Metamorphoses. It is held in the Louvre, in Paris.

== Description ==
The painting portrays Aurora and Cephalus, two figures from classical mythology; the first, the goddess of dawn (known to the Greeks as Eos), falls in love with the second, the husband of Procris, kidnaps him and tries to seduce him. Like the canvas Morpheus and Iris, this work also depicts a female figure, accompanied by a cupid, who looks to a handsome, androgynous, naked young man sleeping (Morpheus on a bed, Cephalus on a cloud). Aurora raises her arms and lifts a starry veil that symbolizes the night, letting flowers fall from her hands. If Iris is naked, Aurora wears a light and transparent dress that leaves her breasts uncovered.

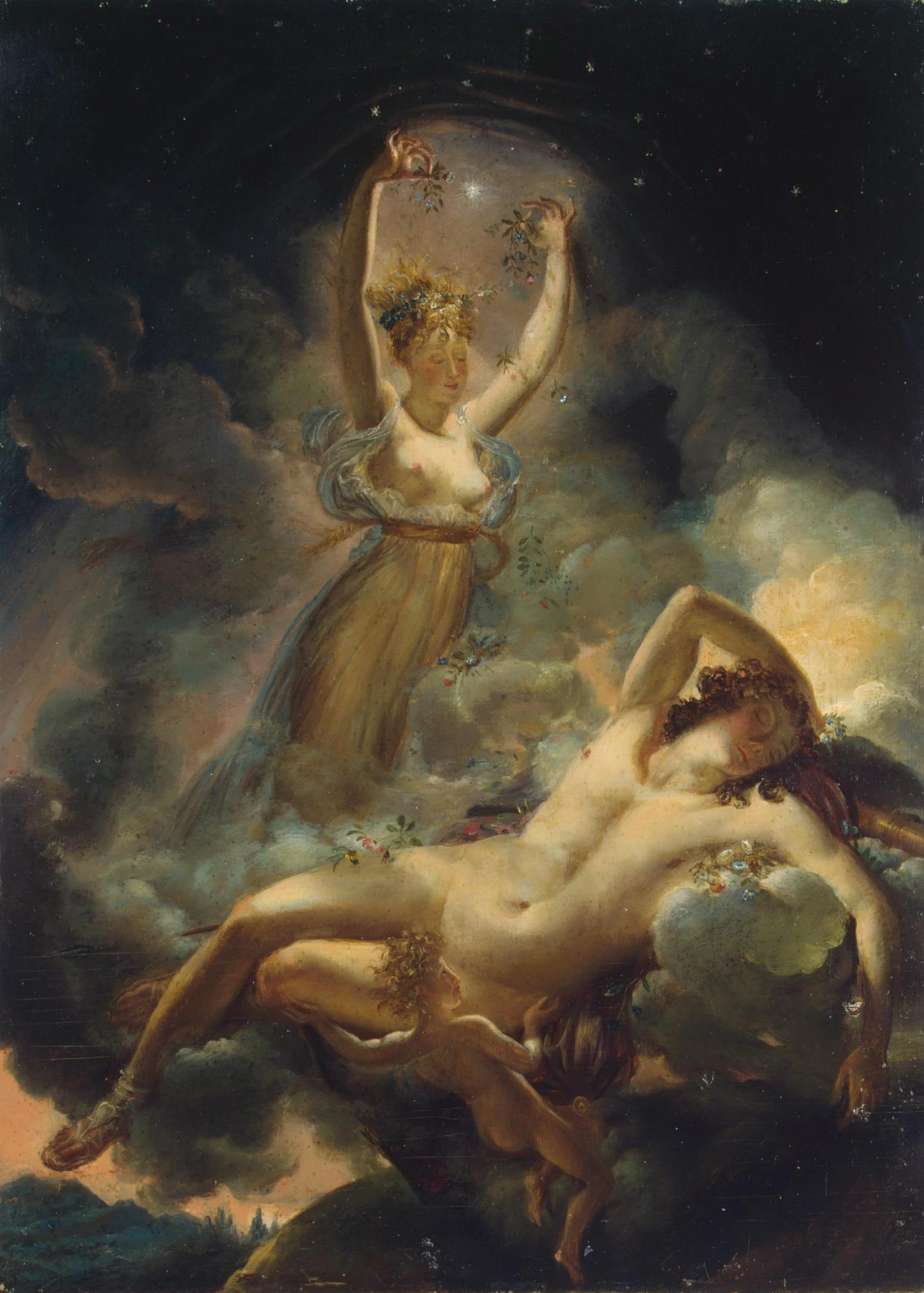
The Hermitage study

A second version, from 1811, is now in held at the Pushkin Museum, in Moscow. An oil sketch for the 1811 work has been in the Hermitage Museum, in Saint Petersburg, since 1978 (inventory number GE-10310).

== Provenance ==
The Parisian version was exhibited at the Salon which took place in the French capital in 1814. The Russian version and Morpheus and Iris were commissioned by Prince Nikolay Yusupov for his Arkhangelskoye Palace, where it was first exhibited in the Psyche Salon. In 1834 it was moved to the Moika Palace in St Petersburg and after the October Revolution it and other works from the Yusupov collection were seized for the national collection. In 1924 it entered the Hermitage Museum. but in 1925 it was transferred to the new Pushkin Museum in Moscow.
