= Mary Novik =

Canadian novelist

Mary Novik is a Canadian novelist.

== Biography ==
Born in Victoria, British Columbia and raised in Victoria and Surrey, Mary Novik received a Ph.D. in literature from The University of British Columbia and lives in Vancouver, British Columbia. Novik taught literature and creative writing at Langara College in Vancouver, wrote reviews and articles on poetry, and now belongs to the fiction writing group, SPiN, which includes Jen Sookfong Lee and June Hutton.

== Literary works ==
Mary Novik is the author of two novels set in the past, Conceit and Muse, in which fiction and fact are creatively mingled. Novik is engaged in an "ongoing exploration of minor characters in the lives of great figures of literature" and is part of the current "boom" in historical fiction in Canada.

Mary Novik's debut novel, Conceit (Doubleday Canada, 2007) is about Pegge Donne, the daughter of the Metaphysical poet John Donne, and is set in 17th century London. Other fictional characters based on historical people are Donne's wife Ann More, the diarist Samuel Pepys, and the fisherman Izaak Walton. Conceit has been praised for its "breathtaking ambition". It won the Ethel Wilson Fiction Prize and was nominated for the Scotiabank Giller Prize. It was chosen as a Book of the Year by both The Globe and Mail and Quill & Quire. Canada Reads named Conceit one of the Top 40 Essential Canadian Novels of the Decade.

Novik's novel Muse (Doubleday Canada, 2013) is the second in a series of works imagining "the circumstances surrounding the creation of venerated works of art: in this case, the love sonnets of the Italian bard, Petrarch." Solange Le Blanc, a fictional narrator inspired by the unidentified mother of Petrarch's children, "is posited as the poet's muse" and "the use of fictional characters interacting with true historical figures is a liberating creative device". The novel "recreates" 14th-century Avignon in the time of the popes, "its corruption and excesses, its beauty and its art."

== Bibliography ==
- Conceit (2007) - ISBN 978-0-385-66205-5
- Muse (2013) - ISBN 978-0-385-66821-7
- L'amante del Papa (2013) - ISBN 978-88-541-5182-6
- Muse (French, 2015) - ISBN 978-2-89723-407-2
