= Pierre-Narcisse Guérin =

French painter (1774–1833)

Pierre-Narcisse, baron Guérin
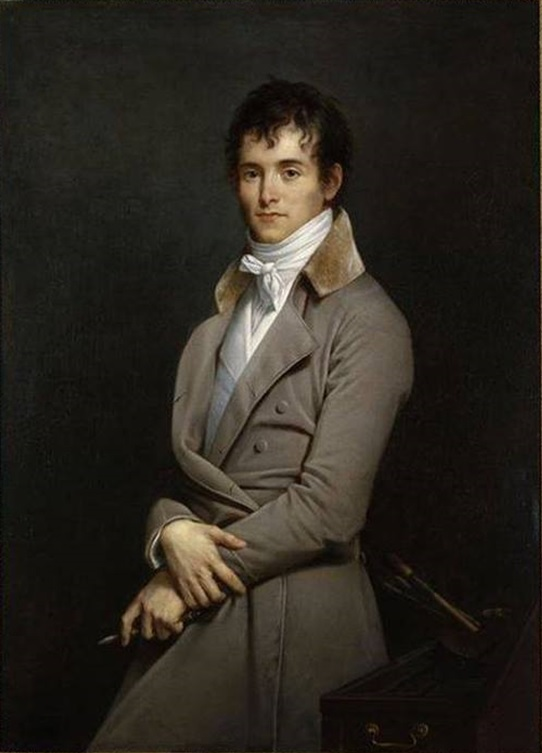
- Portrait of Pierre-Narcisse Guérin by Robert Lefèvre (1801)
- Born: 13 March 1774; Paris, France
- Died: 6 July 1833 (aged 59); Rome, Papal States
- Known for: Painting
- Notable work: Jeune fille en buste

Pierre-Narcisse, baron Guérin (13 March 1774 – 6 July 1833) was a French painter, born in Paris.

== Biography ==
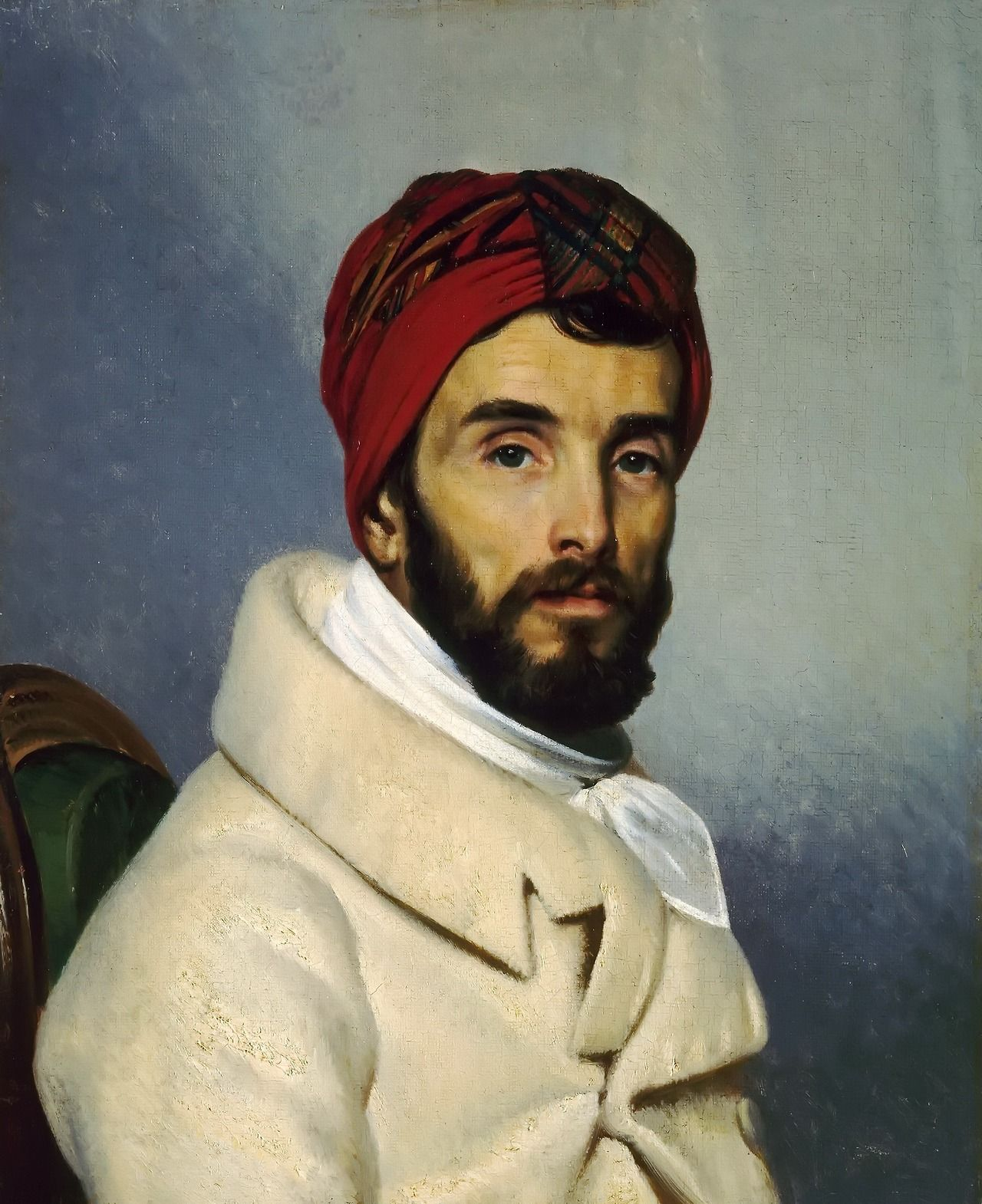
Portrait of Guérin by François Bouchot (1830)

A pupil of Jean-Baptiste Regnault, he carried off one of the three grands prix offered in 1796, in consequence of the competition not having taken place since 1793. In 1799, his painting The Return of Marcus Sextus (Louvre) was exhibited at the Salon and excited wild enthusiasm. Part of this was due to the subject – a victim of Sulla's proscription returning to Rome to find his wife dead and his house in mourning – in which an allusion was found to the turmoil of the French Revolution.

Guérin on this occasion was publicly crowned by the president of the institute, and went to Rome to study under Joseph-Benoît Suvée. In 1800, unable to remain in Rome on account of his health, he went to Naples, where he painted The Shepherds in the Tomb of Amyntas . In 1802 Guérin produced Phaedra and Hippolytus (Louvre); in 1810, after his return to Paris, he again achieved a great success with Andromache and Pyrrhus (Louvre); and in the same year also exhibited Aurora and Cephalus (Pushkin Museum) and Bonaparte and the Rebels of Cairo (Versailles).

The Restoration brought to Guérin fresh honours; he had received from the first consul in 1803 the cross of the Legion of Honour, and in 1815 Louis XVIII named him to the Académie des Beaux-Arts. His style changed to accord with popular taste. In Aeneas Relating to Dido the Disasters of Troy (Louvre), Guérin adopted a more sensuous, picturesque style.

Guérin was commissioned to paint for the Madeleine a scene from the history of St Louis, but his health prevented him from accomplishing what he had begun, and in 1822 he accepted the post of director of the French Academy in Rome, which in 1816 he had refused. On returning to Paris in 1828, Guérin, who had previously been made chevalier of the order of St. Michel, was ennobled. He now attempted to complete Pyrrhus and Priam, a work which he had begun at Rome, but in vain; his health had finally broken down, and in the hope of improvement he returned to Italy with Horace Vernet. Shortly after his arrival at Rome Baron Guérin died, on 6 July 1833, and was buried in the church of La Trinité de Monti by the side of Claude Lorrain.

A heroic portrait by Guerin hangs in the Basilica of the National Shrine of the Assumption of the Blessed Virgin Mary in Baltimore. An 1821 gift of King Louis XVIII, it depicts the episode of the Descent from the Cross.

== Pupils ==
Many artists studied with Guérin, among them Eugène Delacroix, Théodore Géricault, Ary and Hendrik Scheffer.

== Selected paintings ==
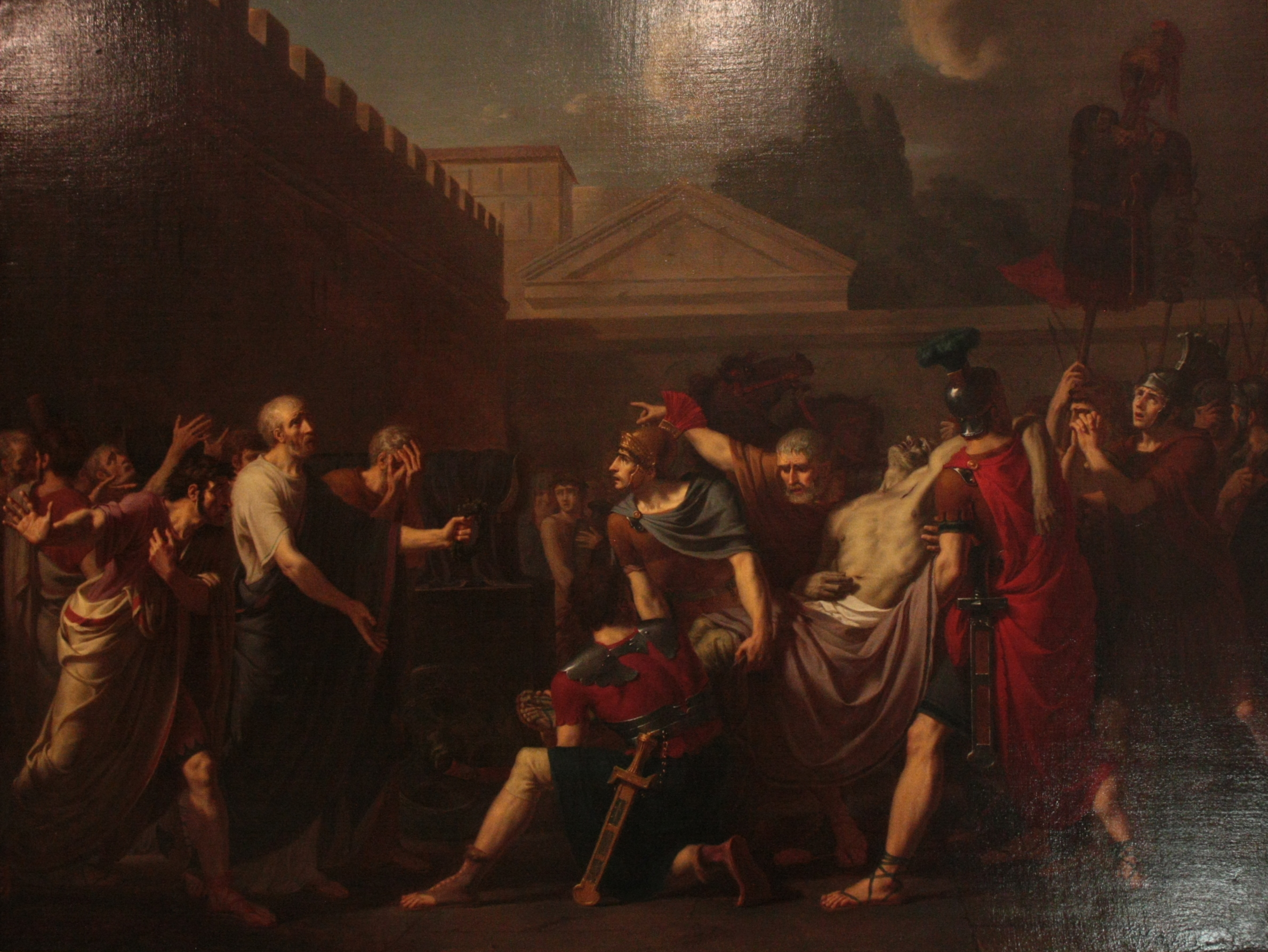
The Death of Brutus (1793), Museum of the French Revolution

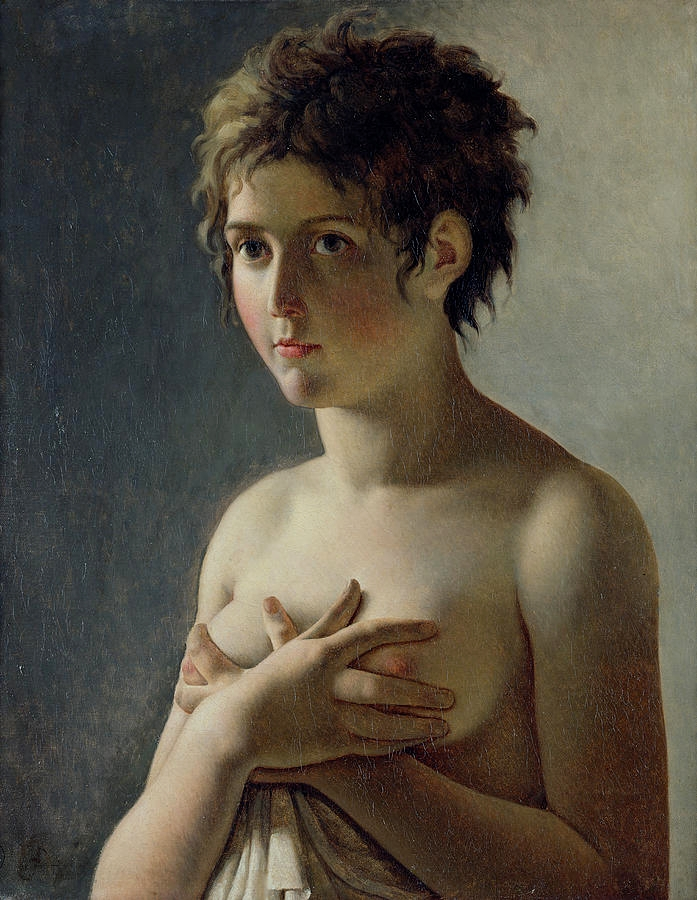
Portrait of a Young Girl (c.1794)
Louvre Museum

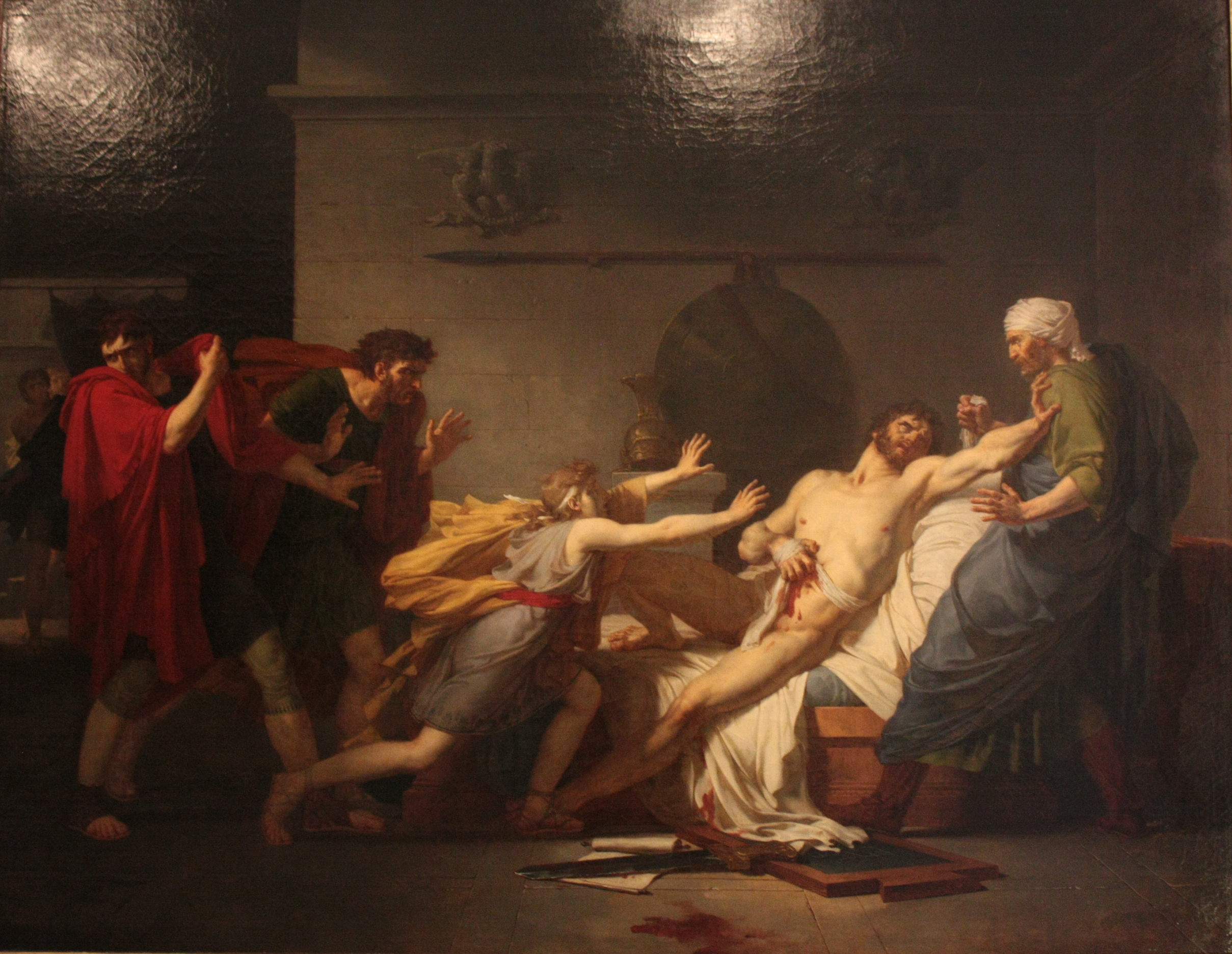
The Death of Cato (1797), Museum of the French Revolution

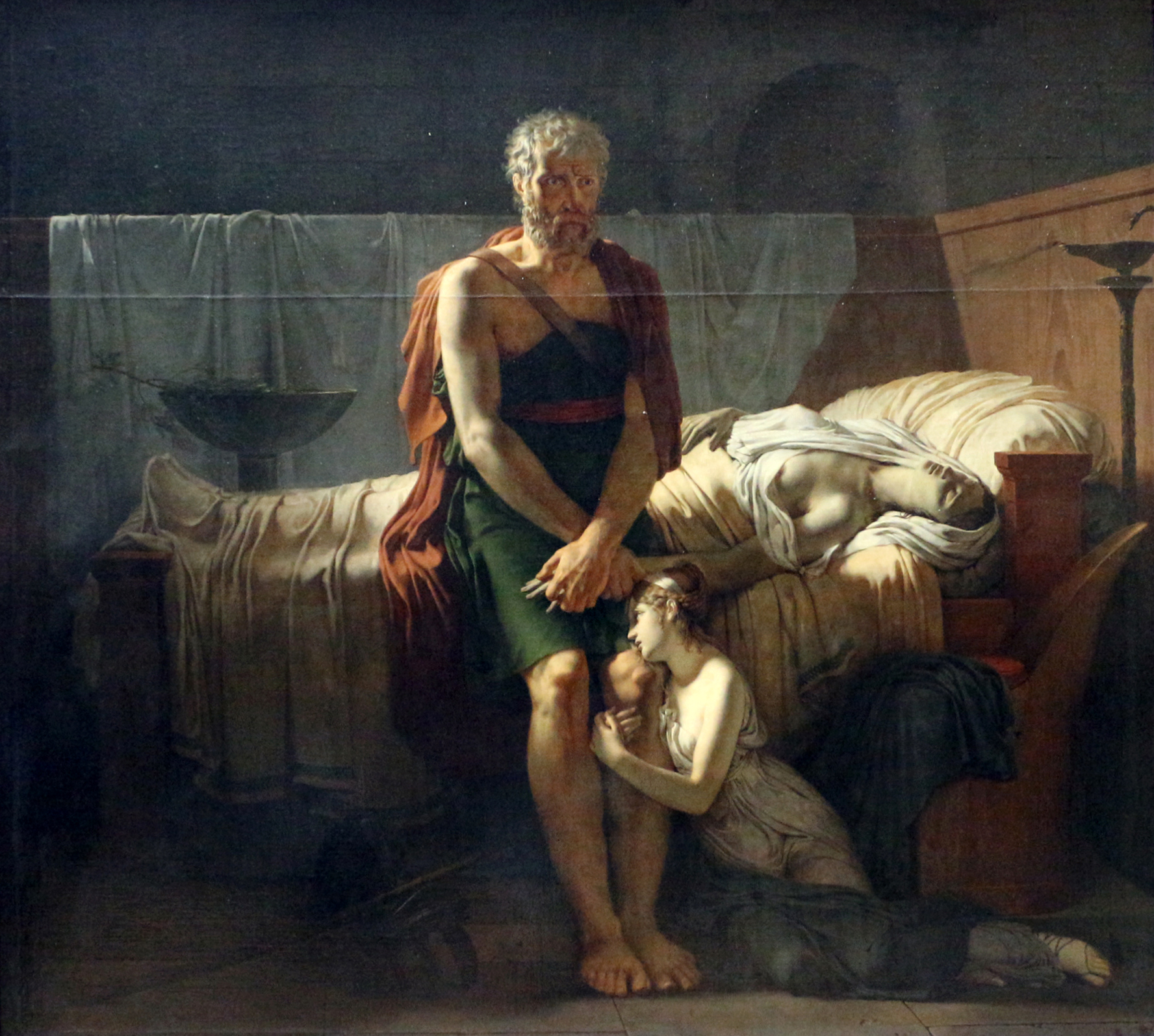
The Return of Marcus Sextus (1799), Louvre

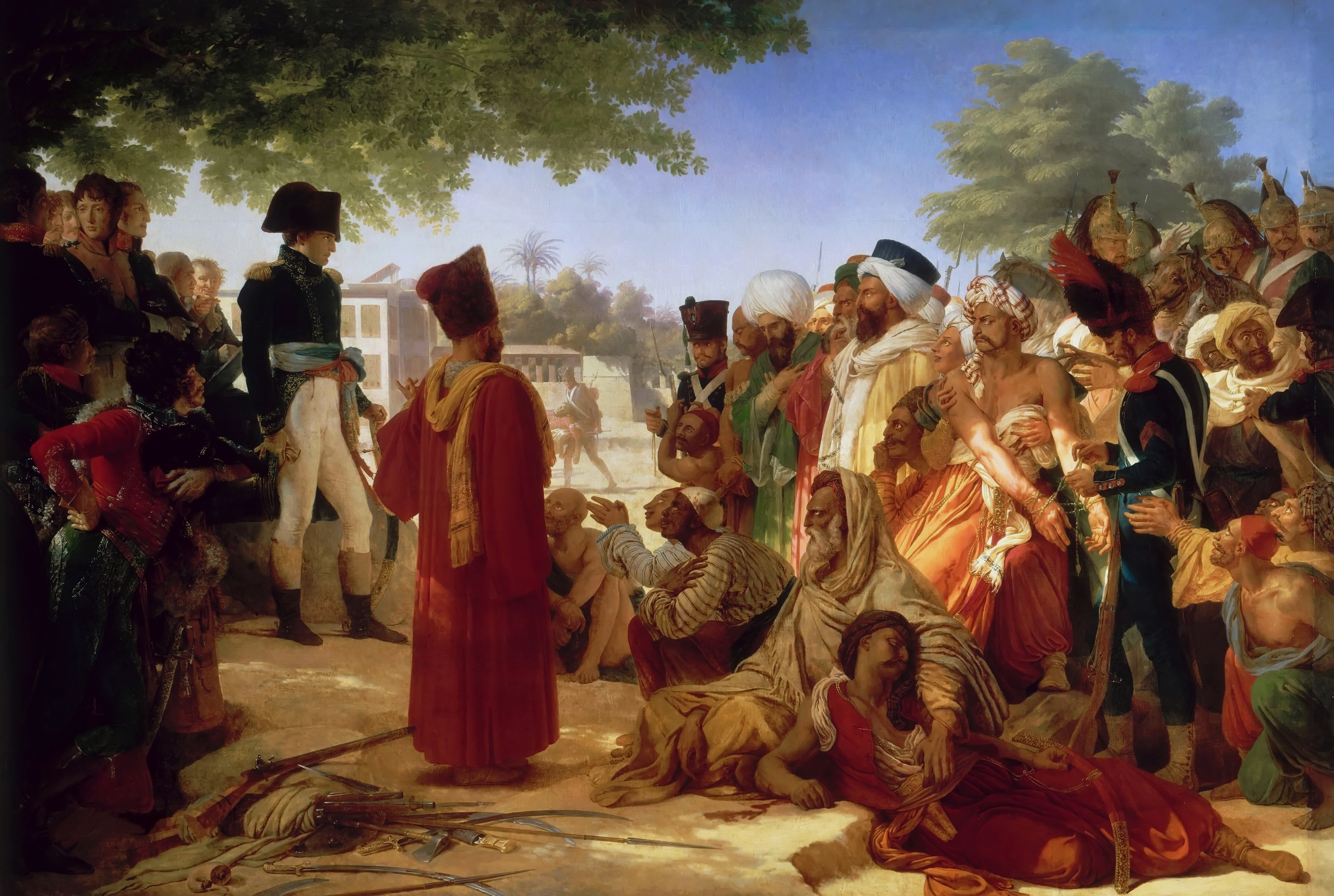
Napoleon Pardoning the Rebels at Cairo (1808), Palace of Versailles

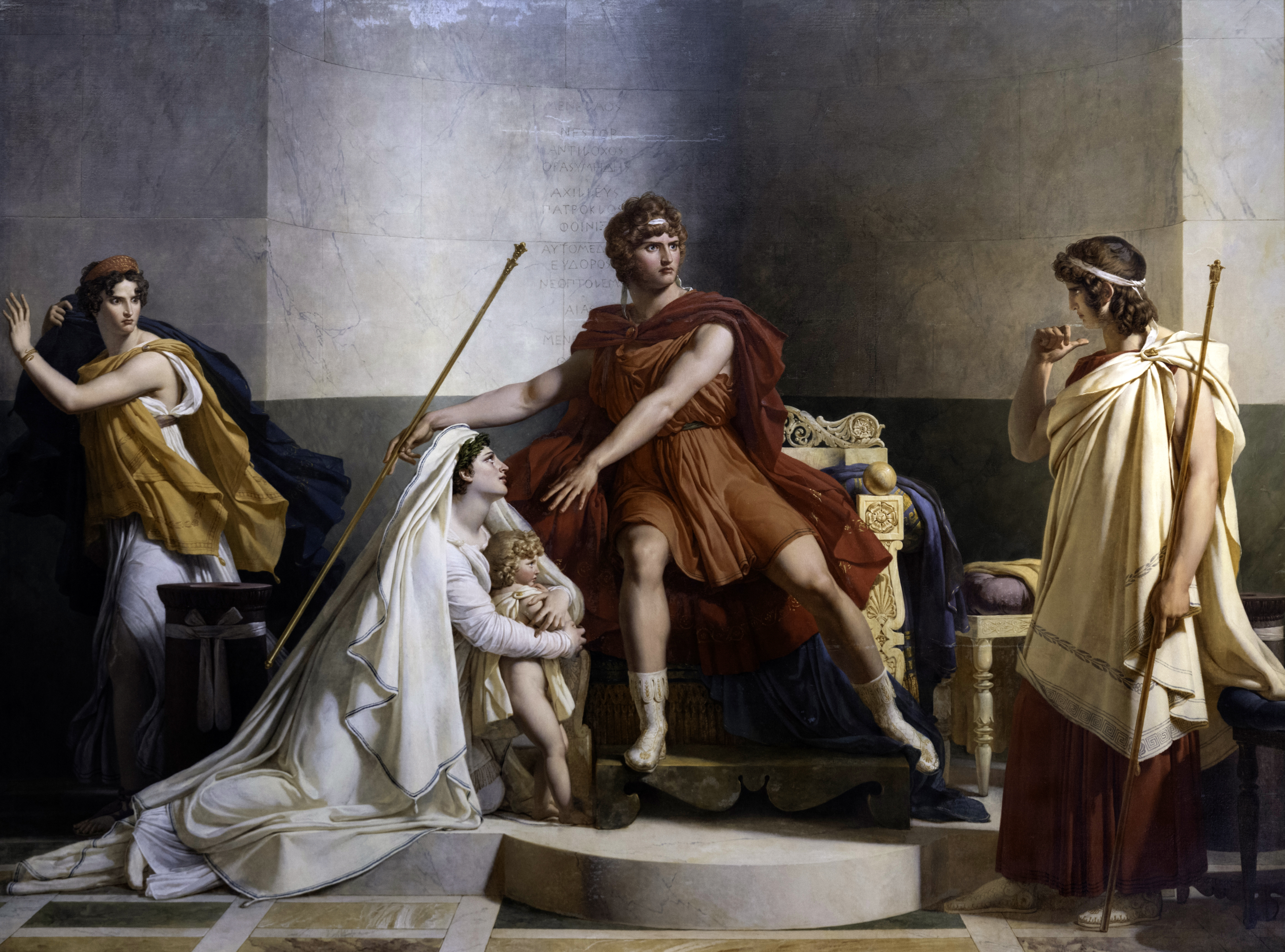
Andromache and Pyrrhus (1810) Louvre

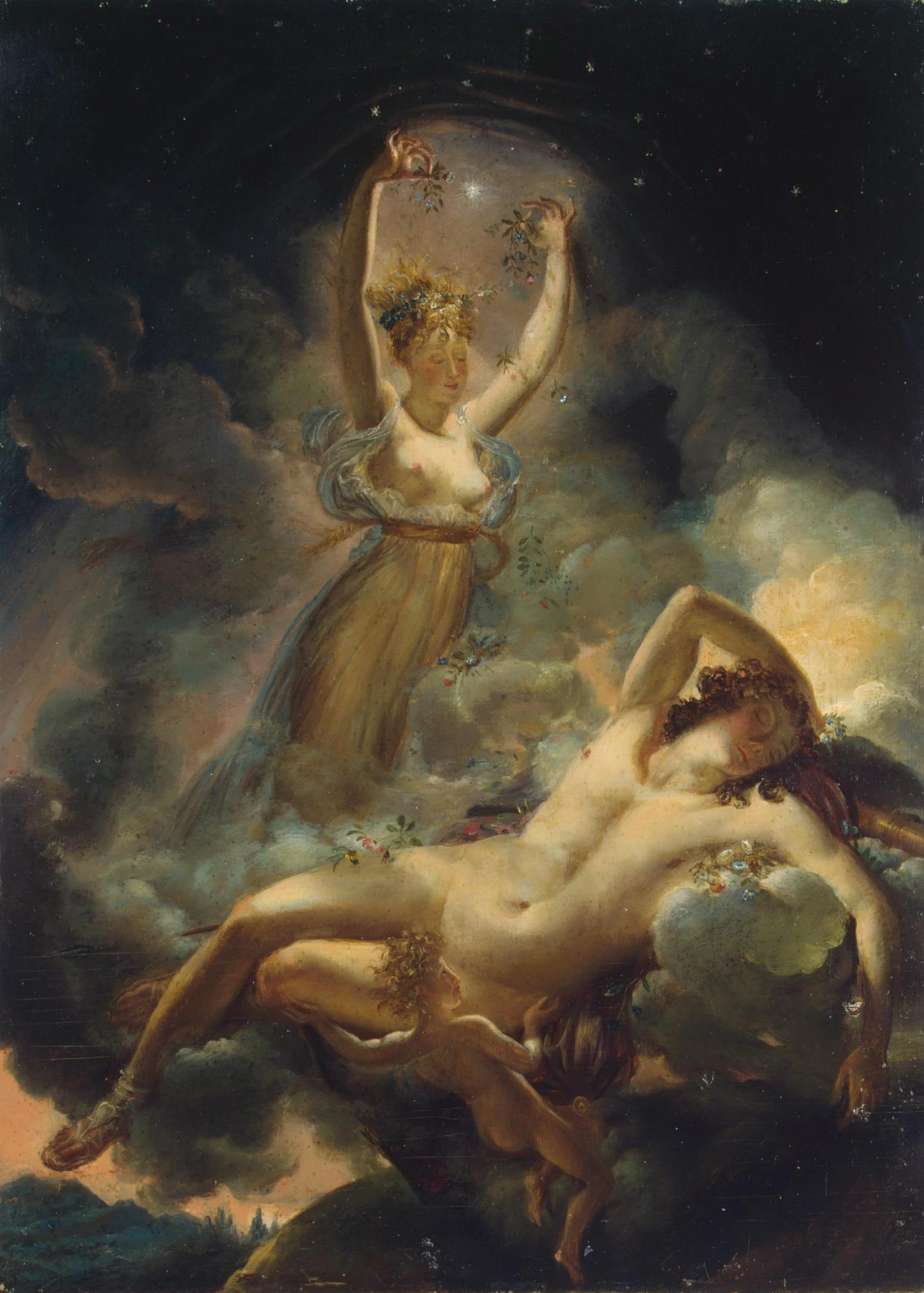
Aurora and Cephalus, 1811

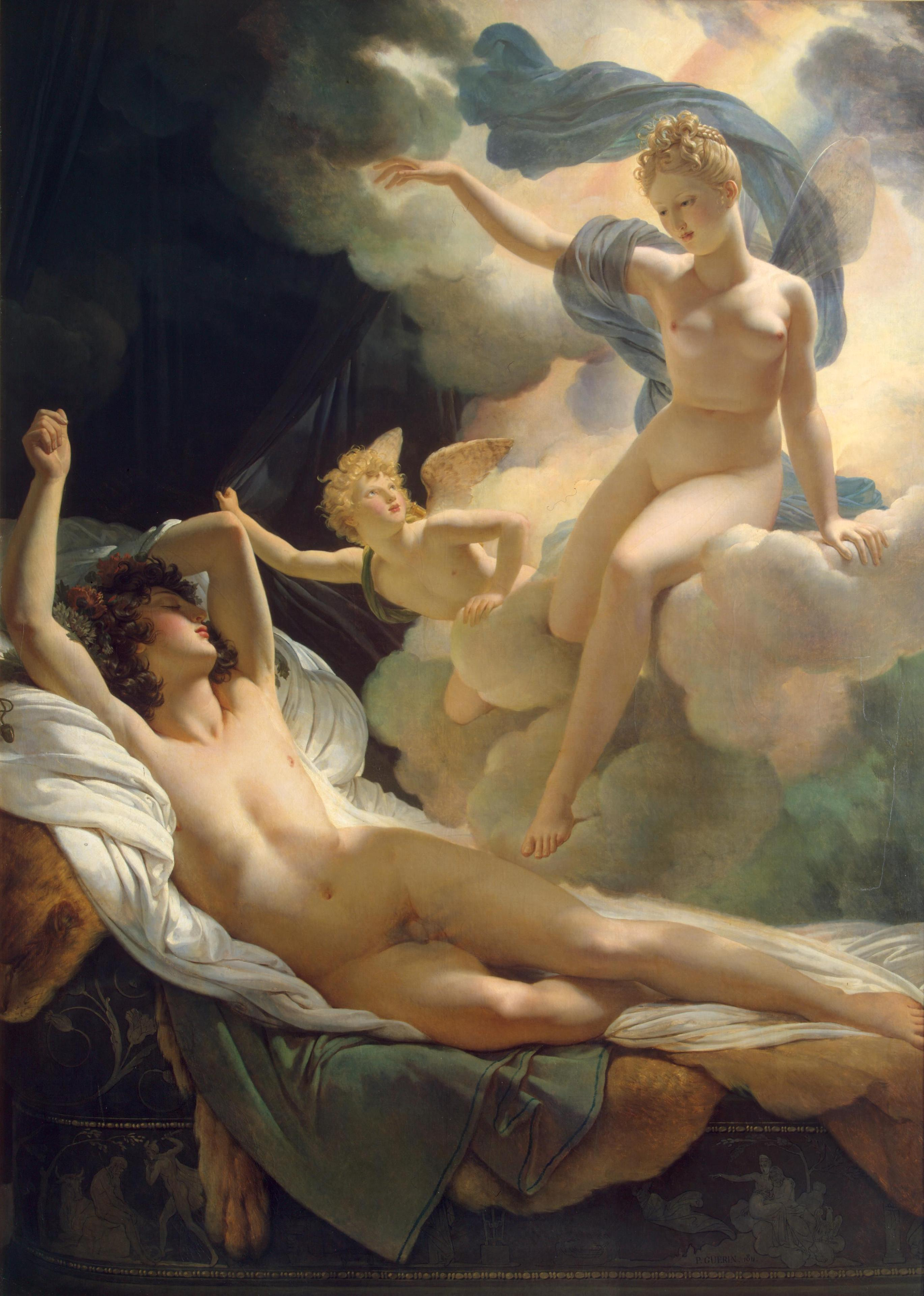
Morpheus and Iris (1811) Hermitage Museum

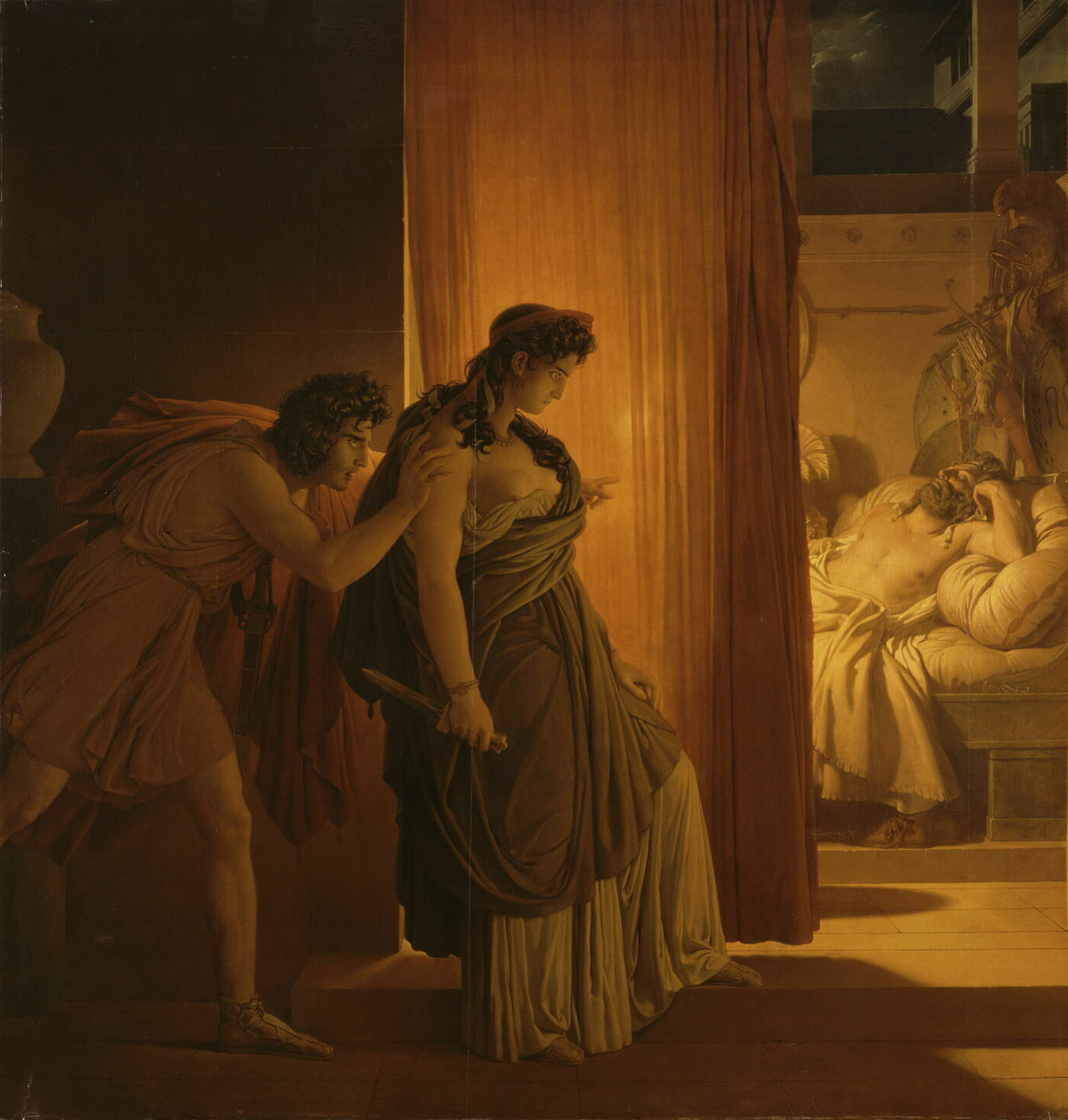
Clytemnestra Hesitating Before Striking Agamemnon (1817) Louvre Museum

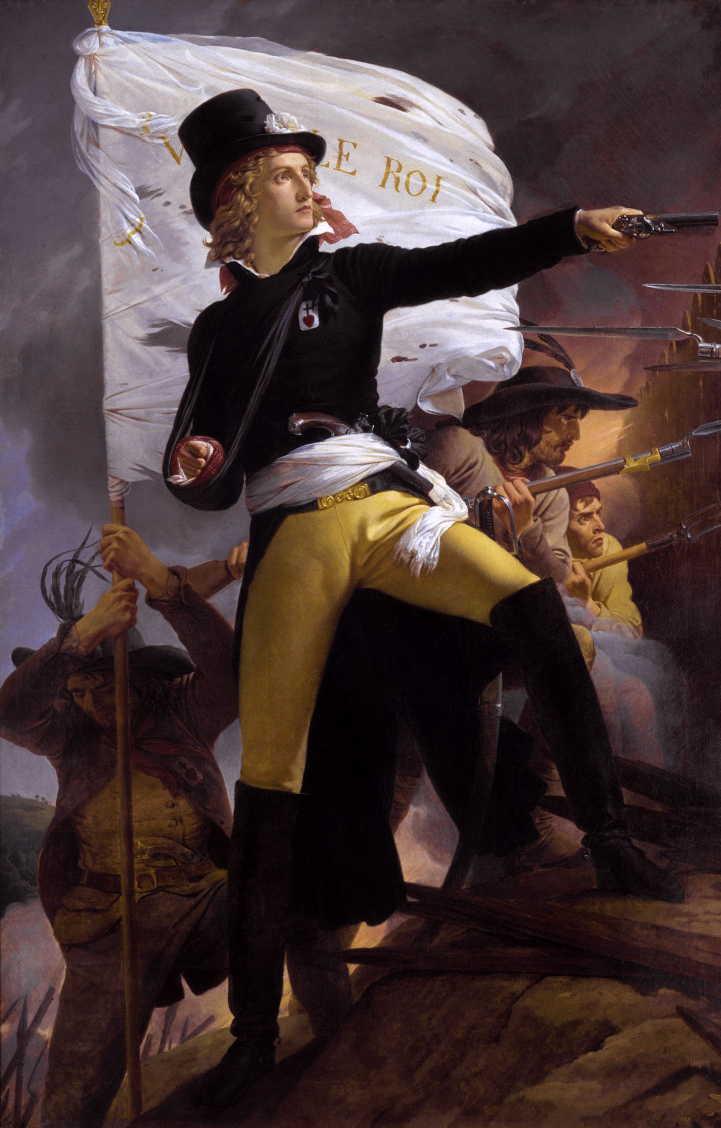
Portrait of Henri de la Rochejaquelein (1816) Musée d'Art et d'Histoire de Cholet

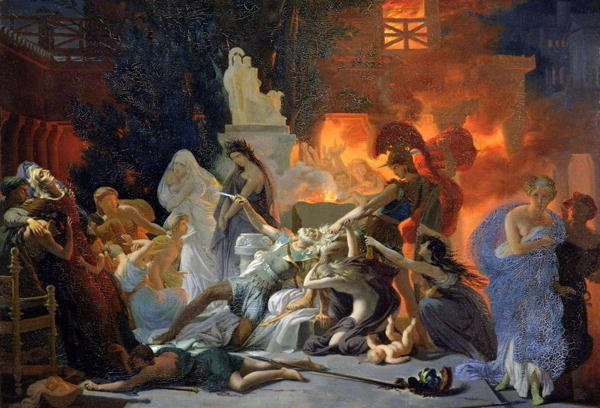
The Death of Priam (1817),
Musée des Beaux-Arts d'Angers.
