= Bill Duthie Booksellers' Choice Award =

Literary award

The Bill Duthie Booksellers' Choice Award is a literary prize awarded annually by the BC Book Prizes for the "best book in terms of public appeal, initiative, design, production and content." The prize is shared by the author and publisher. To qualify, the publisher must be located in British Columbia or the Yukon and in full creative control (editing, design and production). The winner, unlike the other prizes which are determined by judges, is selected by ballot sent to bookstores across the province of British Columbia.

== History ==
The award is named in honour of BC bookseller Bill Duthie who founded Duthie Books in 1957. It was first awarded in 1985 and was one of the original four prizes awarded by the BC Book Prizes. The prize used to be called "BC Booksellers' Choice Award in Honour of Bill Duthie" but the name was simplified in 2010 to align with the other BC Book Prizes.

== Winners and finalists ==
Winners and finalists
Year	Winner	Nominees
1985	Islands Protection Society – Islands at the Edge (Douglas & McIntyre)	Hilary Stewart – Cedar (Douglas & McIntyre); John Edwards – The Roman Cookery of Apicius (Hartley & Marks)
1986	Cameron Young et al., – The Forests of British Columbia (Whitecap Books)	John Adams and Becky Thomas – Floating Schools and Frozen Inkwells (Harbour Publishing); Philip Hersee – Vancouver: Touch The Magic (self-published)
1987	Doris Shadbolt – Bill Reid (Douglas & McIntyre)	Philip Croft – Nature Diary of a Quiet Pedestrian (Harbour Publishing); Ruth Kirk – Wisdom of the Elders (Douglas & McIntyre)
1988	Hilary Stewart – The Adventures and Sufferings of John R. Jewitt (Douglas & McIntyre)	Rick Hansen, Jim Taylor – Rick Hansen: Man In Motion (Douglas & McIntyre); Howard White, Jim Spilsbury – Spilsbury's Coast (Harbour Publishing)
1989	Michael M'Gonigle, Wendy Wickwire – Stein: The Way of the River (Talonbooks)	Bruce Hutchison – A Life In The Country (Douglas & McIntyre); Joe Garner – Never Chop Your Rope (Cinnabar Press)
1990	Western Canada Wilderness Committee – Carmanah (Western Canada Wilderness Committee)	Paul St. Pierre – Chilcotin & Beyond (Douglas & McIntyre); Bob Herger, Rosemary Neering – The Coast Of British Columbia (Whitecap Books)
1991	Michael Kluckner – Vanishing Vancouver (Whitecap Books)	Jim Spilsbury – Spilsbury's Album (Harbour Publishing); Jack Webster – Webster! (Douglas & McIntyre)
1992	Robert Bringhurst and Ulli Steltzer (photographer) – The Black Canoe: Bill Reid and the Spirit of Hakla Gwaii (Douglas & McIntyre)	Liv Kennedy – Coastal Villages (Harbour Publishing); Bruce Obee, Tim Fitzharris – Coastal Wildlife of British Columbia (Whitecap Books)
1993	Nick Bantock – Sabine's Notebook (Chronicle Books)	Terry Glavin and the Nemiah Valley Peoples – Nemiah: The Unconquered Country (New Star Books); Bruce MacDonald – Vancouver: A Visual History (Talonbooks)
1994	Alan Haig-Brown – Fishing for a Living (Harbour Publishing)	Diane Swanson – The Emerald Sea (Whitecap Books); Clayton Mack – Grizzlies & White Guys (Harbour Publishing)
1995	Robert Davidson, Ulli Steltzer – Eagle Transforming (Douglas & McIntyre)	Tom Henry – The Good Company (Harbour Publishing); Rosalind MacPhee – Picasso's Women (Douglas & McIntyre)
1996	Bill Richardson – Bachelor Brothers' Bed and Breakfast Pillow Book (Douglas & McIntyre)	Candace Savage – Bird Brains: The Intelligence of Crows, Ravens, Magpies, and Jays (Greystone Books); Ken Drushka – HR: A Biography of H. R. MacMillan (Harbour Publishing)
1997	Richard Cannings, Sydney Cannings – British Columbia: A Natural History (Greystone Books)	Bruce Obee – Over Beautiful British Columbia: An Aerial Adventure (Beautiful British Columbia Magazine); Maria Coffey – Sailing Back in Time (Whitecap Books)
1998	Ian McAllister, Karen McAllister, Cameron Young – The Great Bear Rainforest (Harbour Publishing)	Keith Keller – Dangerous Waters (Harbour Publishing); Ian Gill – Haida Gwaii (Raincoast Books)
1999	Tom Henry – Westcoasters: Boats that Built BC (Harbour Publishing)	Wade Davis – The Clouded Leopard (Douglas & McIntyre); Chris Jaksa, Lynn Tanod – Guiding Lights: BC's Lighthouses and their Keepers (Harbour Publishing)
2000	Derek Hayes – Historical Atlas of British Columbia and the Pacific Northwest (Douglas & McIntyre)	Faith Moosang – First Son: Portraits by C. D. Hoy (Arsenal Pulp Press/Presentation House Gallery); Lilia D'Acres, Don Luxton – Lions Gate (Talonbooks); John Baldwin – Mountains of the Coast (Harbour Publishing); Kenneth Macrae Leighton – Oar & Sail: An Odyssey of the West Coast (Creekstone Press)
2001	Dan Francis – The Encyclopedia of British Columbia (Harbour Publishing)	Patricia Van Tighem – The Bear's Embrace (Anchor); Douglas Coupland – City of Glass (Douglas & McIntyre); Terry Glavin – The Last Great Sea (Greystone Books); Rosemary Neering – Wild West Women (Whitecap Books)
2002	Terry Reksten – Illustrated History of BC (Douglas & McIntyre)	Will Ferguson, Ian Ferguson – How to Be a Canadian (Douglas & McIntyre); Wade Davis – Light at the Edge of the World (Douglas & McIntyre); Rick Blacklaws, Diana French – Ranchland (Harbour Publishing); Keith Thor Carlson, Colin Duffield, Albert (Sonny) McHalsie, Jan Perrier, Leeanna Lynn Rhodes, David M. Schaepe and David Smith – A Stó:lo–Coast Salish Historical Atlas (Douglas & McIntyre / University of Washington Press / Stó:lo Heritage Trust)
2003	Robb Douglas, Peter A. Robson, Betty Keller – Skookum Tugs: British Columbia's Working Tugboats (Harbour Publishing)	Bill Richardson – Dear Sad Goat (Douglas & McIntyre); Ian Thom – E. J. Hughes (Douglas & McIntyre); Derek Hayes – Historical Atlas of Canada (Douglas & McIntyre); Alison Watt – The Last Island: A Naturalist's Sojourn on Triangle Island (Harbour Publishing)
2004	R. Samuel Bawif – The Secret Voyage of Sir Francis Drake, 1577–1580 (Douglas & McIntyre)	Doreen Armitage – From the Wheelhouse: Tug Boaters Tell Their Own Stories (Harbour Publishing); Bill Proctor and Yvonne Maximchuk – Full Moon, Flood Tide: Bill Proctor's Raincoast(Harbour Publishing); David Nunuk – Natural Light: Visions of British Columbia (Harbour Publishing); Andrew Scott – Painter, Paddler: The Art and Adventures of Stewart Marshall (TouchWood Editions)
2005	Harvey Thommasen, Kevin Hutchings, R. Wayne Campbell, Mark Hume – Birds of the Raincoast: Habits and Habitat (Harbour Publishing)	Anny Scoones – Home: Tales of a Heritage Farm (Hedgerow Press); Stephen Hume – Raincoast Chronicles 20: Lilies and Fireweed: Frontier Women of British Columbia (Harbour Publishing); Douglas Coupland – Souvenir of Canada 2 (Douglas & McIntyre); David Suzuki and Wayne Grady – Tree: A Life Story (Greystone Books)
2006	James P. Delgado – Waterfront: The Illustrated Maritime Story of Greater Vancouver (Stanton Atkins & Dosil Publishers)	Sheila Harrington, Judith Stevenson, and Kathy Dunster – Islands in the Salish Sea: A Community Atlas (TouchWood Editions); Andy Lamb, Bernard Hanby – Marine Life of the Pacific Northwest (Harbour Publishing); Douglas Coupland – Terry (Douglas & McIntyre); Juri Peepre and Sarah Locke – Three Rivers: The Yukon's Great Boreal Wilderness (Harbour Publishing)
2007	David Suzuki – David Suzuki: The Autobiography (Greystone Books)	Lynne Van Luven (editor) – Nobody's Mother: Life Without Kids (TouchWood Editions); Daina Augaitis, Lucille Bell, Nika Collison, Vince Collison, Robert Davidson, Jacqueline Gijssen, Guujaw, Marianne Jones, Peter Macnair, Bill Reid, Isabel Rorick, Michael Nicoll Yahgulanaas, Don Yoemans – Raven Travelling: Two Centuries of Haida Art (Douglas & McIntyre); Michael Kluckner – Vancouver Remembered (Whitecap Books); Sylvia Olsen – Yetsa's Sweater (Sono Nis Press)
2008	Ian McAllister – The Last Wild Wolves: Ghosts of the Great Bear Rainforest (Greystone Books)	Mike McCardell – The Blue Flames that Keep Us Warm: Mike McCardell's Favourite Stories (Harbour Publishing); Grant Arnold, Michael Turner – Fred Herzog: Vancouver Photographs (Douglas & McIntyre); Ishmael Beah – A Long Way Gone: Memoirs of a Boy Soldier (Douglas & McIntyre); Chris Harris – Spirit In the Grass: The Cariboo Chilcotin's Forgotten Landscape (Country Light Publishing)
2009	Stephen R. Bown – Madness, Betrayal and the Lash: The Epic Voyage of Captain George Vancouver (Douglas & McIntyre)	Jean Barman – British Columbia: Spirit of the People (Harbour Publishing); Michael Nicoll Yahgulanaas – Flight of the Hummingbird: A Parable for the Environment (Greystone Books); Cathy Converse – Following the Curve of Time: The Legendary M. Wylie Blanchet (TouchWood Editions); Andrew Nikiforuk – Tar Sands: Dirty Oil and the Future of a Continent (Greystone Books)
2010	Brian Brett – Trauma Farm: A Rebel History of Rural Life (Greystone Books)	Andrew Scott – Encyclopedia of Raincoast Place Names: A Complete Reference to Coastal British Columbia (Harbour Publishing); Dal Richards with Jim Taylor – One More Time: The Dal Richards Story (Harbour Publishing); Michael Nicoll Yahgulanaas – Red: A Haida Manga (Douglas & McIntyre); Masako Fukawa, Stanley Fukawa – Spirit of the Nikkei Fleet: BC's Japanese Canadian Fishermen (Harbour Publishing)
2011	Grant Lawrence – Adventures in Solitude: What Not to Wear to a Nude Potluck and Other Stories from Desolation Sound (Harbour Publishing)	Zsuzsi Gartner (editor) – Darwin's Bastards: Astounding Tales from Tomorrow (Douglas & McIntyre); Ross King – Defiant Spirits: The Modernist Revolution of the Group of Seven (Douglas & McIntyre, co-published with McMichael Canadian Art Collection); Gary Kent, illustrated by Kim La Fave – Fishing with Gubby (Harbour Publishing); Robert Budd – Voices of British Columbia: Stories from Our Frontier (Douglas & McIntyre)
2012	Chuck Davis – The Chuck Davis History of Metropolitan Vancouver (Harbour Publishing)	Charlotte Gill – Eating Dirt (Greystone Books in partnership with the David Suzuki Foundation); Fred Herzog – Fred Herzog: Photographs (Douglas & McIntyre); Gary Hynes – Island Wineries of British Columbia (TouchWood Editions); Robert Wiersema – Walk Like a Man: Coming of Age with the Music of Bruce Springsteen (Greystone Books)
2013	Shelley Fralic, with research by Kate Bird – Making Headlines: 100 Years of The Vancouver Sun (The Vancouver Sun)	Jackson Davies and Marc Strange – Bruno and the Beach: The Beachcombers at 40 (Harbour Publishing); Daniel Francis – Trucking in British Columbia: An Illustrated History (Harbour Publishing); Derek Hayes – British Columbia: A New Historical Atlas (Douglas & McIntyre); Harold Kalman and Robin Ward – Exploring Vancouver: The Architectural Guide (Douglas & McIntyre)
2014	Grant Lawrence – The Lonely End of the Rink: Confessions of a Reluctant Goalie (Douglas & McIntyre)	Jesse Donaldson – This Day in Vancouver (Anvil Press); Michael Layland – The Land of Heart's Delight: Early Maps and Charts of Vancouver Island (TouchWood Editions); Roy Henry Vickers and Robert Budd – Raven Brings the Light (Harbour Publishing); Paula Wild – The Cougar: Beautiful, Wild and Dangerous (Douglas & McIntyre)
2015	Aaron Chapman – Live at the Commodore: The Story of Vancouver's Historic Commodore Ballroom (Arsenal Pulp Press)	Roy Henry Vickers and Robert Budd – Cloudwalker (Harbour Publishing); Alicia Priest – A Rock Fell on the Moon: Dad and the Great Yukon Silver Ore Heist (Harbour Publishing); Richard Beamish and Gordon McFarlane (eds) – The Sea Among Us: The Amazing Strait of Georgia (Harbour Publishing); Lisa Ahier with Andrew Morrison – The Sobo Cookbook: Recipes from the Tofino Restaurant at the End of the Canadian Road (Appetite by Random House)
2016	Susan Musgrave – A Taste of Haida Gwaii: Food Gathering and Feasting at the Edge of the World (Whitecap Books)	Caroline Adderson, John Atkin, Kerry Gold, Evelyn Lau, Eve Lazarus, John Mackie, Elise & Stephen Partridge, and Bren Simmers with an introduction by Michael Kluckner and photographs by Tracey Ayton and Caroline Adderson – Vancouver Vanishes: Narratives of Demolition and Revival (Anvil Press); Eve Lazarus – Cold Case Vancouver: The City's Most Baffling Unsolved Murders (Arsenal Pulp Press); Roy Henry Vickers and Robert Budd – Orca Chief (Harbour Publishing); Caroline Woodward – Light Years: Memoir of a Modern Lighthouse Keeper (Harbour Publishing)
2017	Richard Wagamese – Embers: One Ojibway's Meditations (Douglas and McIntyre)	Aaron Chapman – The Last Gang in Town: The Epic Story of the Vancouver Police vs. the Clark Park Gang (Arsenal Pulp Press); Wade Davis – Wade Davis: Photographs (Douglas and McIntyre); Michael Layland – A Perfect Eden: Encounters by Early Explorers of Vancouver Island (TouchWood Editions); Roy Henry Vickers and Robert Budd – Peace Dancer (Harbour Publishing)
2018	Pat Carney – On Island: Life Among the Coast Dwellers (TouchWood Editions)	Carleigh Baker – Bad Endings (Anvil Press); Anita Hadley and Michael L. Hadley (editors) – Spindrift: A Canadian Book of the Sea (Douglas and McIntyre); Grant Lawrence – Dirty Windshields: The Best and the Worst of the Smugglers Tour Diaries (Douglas & McIntyre); Roy Henry Vickers and Robert Budd – Hello Humpback! (Harbour Publishing)
2019	Bob Joseph – 21 Things You May Not Know About the Indian Act (Page Two Strategies)	Robert Amos – E.J. Hughes Paints Vancouver Island (TouchWood Editions); Darrel J. McLeod – Mamaskatch: A Cree Coming of Age (Douglas and McIntyre); Eve Lazarus – Murder by Milkshake: An Astonishing True Tale of Adultery, Arsenic, and a Charismatic Killer (Arsenal Pulp Press); Roy Henry Vickers and Robert Budd – One Eagle Soaring (Harbour Publishing)
2020	Aaron Chapman – Vancouver After Dark: The Wild History of a City’s Nightlife (Arsenal Pulp Press)	Danielle (DL) Acken and Emily Lycopolus – Cedar and Salt: Vancouver Island Recipes from Forest, Farm, Field, and Sea (TouchWood Editions); Roy Henry Vickers and Robert Budd – Voices from the Skeena: An Illustrated Oral History (Harbour Publishing); Bob Joseph – Indigenous Relations: Insights, Tips, and Suggestions to Make Reconciliation a Reality (Page Two Strategies); Bill Richardson – I Saw Three Ships (Talonbooks)
2021	Robert Amos – The E.J. Hughes Book of Boats	Jean Barman – On the Cusp of Contact: Gender, Space and Race in the Colonization of British Columbia; Charles Demers – Primary Obsessions; Eve Lazarus – Vancouver Exposed: Searching for the City’s Hidden History; Roy Henry Vickers and Robert Budd – Raven Squawk, Orca Squeak
2022	Suzanne Simard – Finding the Mother Tree: Discovering the Wisdom of the Forest	Luschiim Arvid Charlie and Nancy J. Turner – Luschiim’s Plants: Traditional Indigenous Foods, Materials and Medicine; Dawn Postnikoff and Joanne Sasvari – Island Eats: Signature Chefs’ Recipes from Vancouver Island and the Salish Sea; Roy Henry Vickers and Robert “Lucky” Budd – A is for Anemone: A First West Coast Alphabet; Iona Whishaw – A Lethal Lesson: A Lane Winslow Mystery
2023	Robert Joseph – Namwayut: We Are All One: A Pathway to Reconciliation	Monique Gray Smith (tr. Dolores Greyeyes Sand, ill. Gabrielle Grimard – I Hope / nipakosêyimon; Grant Lawrence – Return to Solitude: More Desolation Sound Adventures with the Cougar Lady, Russell the Hermit, the Spaghetti Bandit and Others; Eve Lazarus – Cold Case B.C.: The Stories behind the Province’s Most Intriguing Murder and Missing Persons Cases; Gary Wyatt with Robert Davidson – Echoes of the Supernatural: The Graphic Art of Robert Davidson
2024	Jess Housty – Crushed Wild Mint	Sam George with Jill Yonit Goldberg, Liam Belson, Dylan MacPhee, and Tanis Wilson – The Fire Still Burns: Life In and After Residential School; Francine McCabe – Fleece and Fibre: Textile Producers of Vancouver Island and the Gulf Islands; Michael Nicoll Yahgulanaas – JAJ: A Haida Manga; Henry Tsang – White Riot: The 1907 Anti-Asian Riots in Vancouver
2025	Dana Claxton and Curtis Collins – Curve!: Women Carvers on the Northwest Coast	Bill Arnott – A Perfect Day for a Walk: The History, Cultures, and Communities of Vancouver; Daniel Marshall – Untold Tales of Old British Columbia; Marion McKinnon Crook – Always on Call: Adventures in Nursing, Ranching, and Rural Living; Iona Whishaw – Lightning Strikes the Silence
2026	Liz Hammond-Kaarremaa with Alison Ariss, Andrea Fritz, Chepximiya Siyam Chief Dr. Janice George, Danielle Morsette, Debra Qwasen Sparrow, Eliot White-Hill Kwulasultun, Jared Qwustenuxun Williams, Kerrie Charnley, Michael Pavel, sa amitća Susan Pavel, Senaqwila Wyss, Snumithia’ Violet Elliott, Tuwuxwul’t-hw Tyrone Elliott and Xweliqwiya Rena Point Bolton – The Teachings of Mutton: A Coast Salish Woolly Dog	7IDANsuu James Hart and Curtis Collins – 7IDANsuu James Hart: A Monumental Practice; Bob Joseph – 21 Things You Need to Know About Indigenous Self-Government: A Conversation about Dismantling the Indian Act; Phyllis Webstad and Kristy McLeod – Decolonization and Me: Conversations about Healing a Nation and Ourselves; Iona Whishaw – A Season for Spies
