= Before I Wake =

Before I Wake may refer to:

- Before I Wake (1955 film), a 1955 British film
- Before I Wake (2016 film), a 2016 American film
- Before I Wake (Wiersema novel), a novel by Robert J. Wiersema
- Before I Wake (Scott novel), a novel by John Scott
- Before I Wake, a novel by Dee Henderson
- Before I Wake, a 1997 novel by Mark Frost written under the pseudonym Eric Bowman
- Tupac Shakur: Before I Wake..., a 2001 documentary film about Tupac Shakur
- A phrase from the prayer "Now I Lay Me Down to Sleep"
