= Science Magazine (disambiguation) =

Science Magazine, also known as Science, is an academic journal published by the American Association for the Advancement of Science.

Science Magazine may also refer to:

- Science Journal (1965–71 magazine)
- Science Magazine (TV series)
- The Sciences, a science magazine
- Science (1979–1986 magazine)

== See also ==
- List of science magazines
- Scientific journal
