= David Suzuki: The Autobiography =

2006 book by David Suzuki

- First edition
- Editor: Nancy Flight
- Author: David Suzuki
- Language: English
- Genre: Autobiography
- Publisher: Greystone Books
- Publication date: April 22, 2006
- Publication place: Canada
- Media type: Print (Hardcover & Paperback)
- Pages: 405 pages
- ISBN: 1-55365-156-1
- OCLC: 63705397
- Dewey Decimal: 333.72092 B 22
- LC Class: GE56.S8 A3 2006

David Suzuki: The Autobiography is the 2006 autobiography of Canadian science writer and broadcaster David Suzuki. The book focuses mostly on his life since the 1987 publication of his first autobiography, Metamorphosis: Stages in a Life. It begins with a chronological account of his childhood, academic years, and broadcasting career. In later chapters, Suzuki adopts a memoir style, writing about themes such as his relationship with Australia, his experiences in Brazil and Papua New Guinea, the founding of the David Suzuki Foundation, and his thoughts on climate change, celebrity status, technology, and death. Throughout, Suzuki highlights the continuing impact of events from his childhood.

This is Suzuki's forty-third book and, he says, his last. Critics have called the book candid, sincere, and charming, with insightful commentary if occasionally flat stories. Suzuki's scientific background is reflected in the writing's rational and analytic style.

Suzuki's autobiography spent four weeks at No. 1 on the Maclean's list of non-fiction best-sellers and six weeks at No. 6 on the Globe and Mail's list. The book won two awards in 2007: the Canadian Booksellers' Association's Libris Award for Non-Fiction Book of the Year and the British Columbia Booksellers' Choice Award. The publishers, Greystone Books and Douglas & McIntyre, won the CBA Libris Award for Marketing Achievement of the Year.

== Background ==
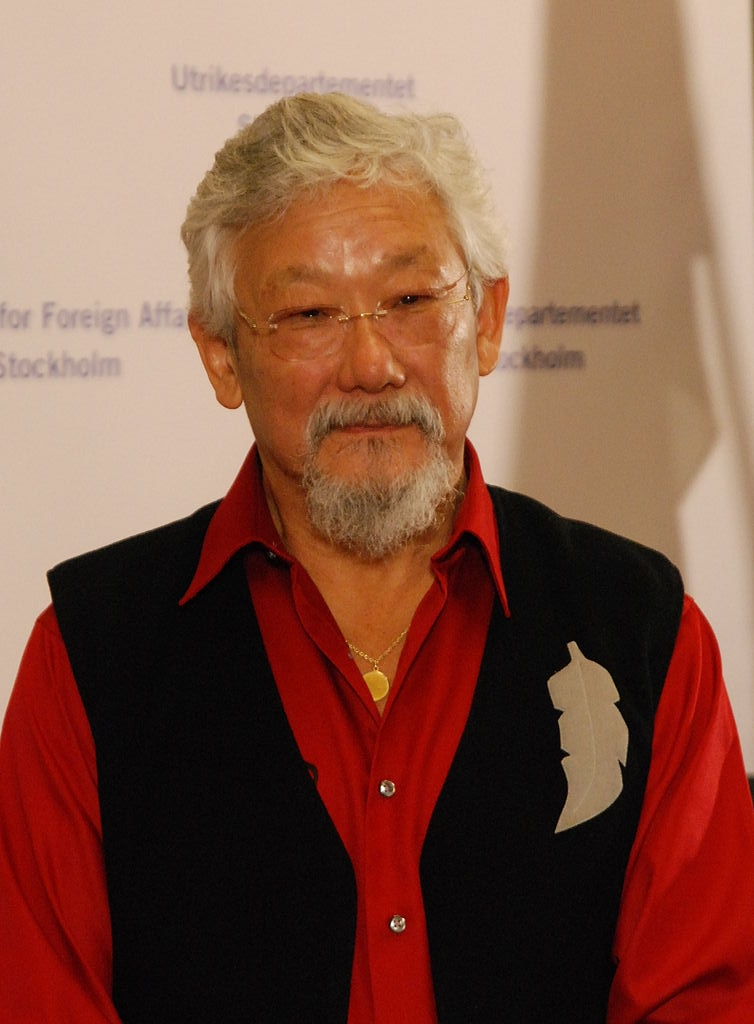
David Suzuki in 2009

Vancouver-based David Suzuki, 70 years old at the time of this book's publication, is best known as an environmental activist and host of the television show The Nature of Things. He has also worked as a geneticist, nature writer, and university professor. His previous book, written in 2002, was Good News for a Change. His 1987 book, Metamorphosis: Stages in a Life, unintentionally became his first autobiography. Metamorphosis was originally drafted as a collection of essays, but following the prompting of his publisher, Suzuki rewrote it in a more autobiographical style.

Suzuki's working title for this second autobiography was The Outsider, a title intended to express the author's view of his own role in society. The origin of this outsider feeling comes from isolation suffered at a Japanese Canadian internment camp during World War II. He was imprisoned there for being Japanese but shunned by other Japanese for being a third generation Canadian, speaking only English. His feeling of isolation continued during his early school years when the only other student of Japanese heritage was his twin sister. Suzuki's daughters acknowledged this perception of himself as an outsider but insist that the public views him very differently, as one of their own, leading to the simple The Autobiography title.

Suzuki's objective in writing the book was to document his experiences of personal rewards gained from the environmental movement and to illustrate, specifically for young people, opportunities in environmentalism. Suzuki believes that he has been unfairly labelled as "the master of doom and gloom" by conservative media outlets and that this book will help balance that view. He intends this autobiography to be his final book. Following its publication he planned to reduce his work week from seven to four days to spend more time with family and personal pursuits.

== Contents ==
The book has eighteen chapters with a two-page preface, which explains his experience with Metamorphosis and how this book complements it. The thesis of this book is identified by one reviewer as: "the importance of childhood's formative years for the development of the person. In Suzuki's case, it is the effects of racism, notably time spent in BC's internment camps during the Second World War, that still haunt him." In an interview, Suzuki said, "my drive to do well has been motivated by the desire to demonstrate to my fellow Canadians that my family and I had not deserved to be treated as we were". Suzuki identifies a turning point of his life as winning his high school's student presidential election. He initially refused to run believing he was not popular enough. His father encouraged him, saying: "There's no disgrace in losing ... The important thing is trying." Suzuki ran and unexpectedly won with an "outsider" platform.

Suzuki recounts his youth and academic years as a student, professor, and genetics researcher. On his broadcasting career, Suzuki recalls early interviews that demonstrated an affinity for public speaking and the jobs that allowed him to travel the world. Regarding his personal life, he describes his relationships with his five children and the development of his two marriages. In a review in the New Zealand Listener, David Larsen observes: "Step by step, you see him thinking his way into full-fledged environmentalism: not because he's a natural zealot, but because he's an intellectually honest man brought face to face with evidence that our current economic and energy policies are digging our grandchildren's graves."

Later chapters tell of events since Metamorphosis. In British Columbia, Suzuki spends time on the Queen Charlotte Islands and in Stein Valley advocating against logging. He describes his travels in Brazil while shooting an episode of The Nature of Things in 1988 and the relationship he developed with the Kayapo people. One of their leaders returned to Canada with him to advocate the protection of his homeland in the Amazon. His tour of Papua New Guinea and how Australia became his second home are explained. He describes the founding and early years of the David Suzuki Foundation, a non-profit organization based on environmental protection and developing sustainability. In the final four chapters Suzuki elaborates on his thoughts about climate change, celebrity status, technology, and death. He laments the lack of global action on climate change, scientific illiteracy on the part of politicians, and the lack of media attention to science. In the final chapter he accepts death as an inevitability and expects his works to be forgotten quickly, leaving his grandchildren as his only true legacy.

== Style and genre ==
Suzuki's tone is relaxed and understated. Robert Wiersema notes that Suzuki's style has "an analytic quality ... probably rooted in his scientific training". Suzuki shows a humble, dry humour and instances of blurting out surprising statements. One reviewer describes the style as a "fusion of by-the-numbers personal narrative and passionate, insightful commentary".

The book begins as a chronological narrative of Suzuki's life with photographs of his family and friends. The first five chapters cover the same time period as the first autobiography, from childhood to age fifty. Later chapters use a memoir style with personal thoughts developed around themes. Suzuki recounts his experiences with indigenous groups and his personal relationships with individual members. A travelogue of his journeys in Brazil, Papua New Guinea, Australia, and some places in Canada is presented. Scientific concepts and explanations occur throughout the book.

== Publication and marketing ==
Two weeks before its release on April 22, 2006, an excerpt was printed in the national daily newspaper The Globe and Mail. Greystone Books, the Vancouver division of Douglas & McIntyre, published the book. The book tour included more than 35 stops over two months throughout Canada. Promoted by the publishers as his "final book tour" and labelled by Suzuki as his "thank-you book tour", it began in Victoria, British Columbia, and included stops from coast-to-coast, from Whitehorse, Yukon, to New Glasgow, Nova Scotia. Attended by nearly 500 people at each event, a multimedia slideshow with personal photos and videos was presented by Suzuki. The publishers estimated that Suzuki signed 5000 books and conducted 137 media interviews. For their efforts Douglas & McIntyre and Greystone Books were awarded the 2007 Canadian Booksellers Association's Libris Award for Marketing Achievement of the Year. In July, the book was published by Allen & Unwin in Australia. Suzuki conducted a promotional tour of both Australia and New Zealand in October and November. The same publishers released paperback editions in April 2007.

== Reception ==
The Autobiography was No. 1 on Maclean's list of nonfiction bestsellers in Canada for four weeks and spent fifteen weeks in the top ten. The book was on The Globe and Mail's non-fiction bestsellers' list for five weeks and peaked at No. 6. The book won the 2007 Canadian Booksellers Association's Libris Award for Non-Fiction Book of the Year and the 2007 British Columbia Booksellers' Choice Award.

Critics variously described his writing as "forthright," "chatty", and "charming". In a review in The Globe and Mail Brian Brett admires "Suzuki's disarming candour" and labels it "a strange, fascinating book". While Brett's review is positive, he calls it "clunkily written" and sometimes repetitive. The Edmonton Journal review notes that Suzuki could "charm the socks off the most hardened soul", but that many of his stories fall flat. The review in the Quill & Quire notes Suzuki "has not written an indulgent autobiography" and that he "is too polite to dish on his enemies". Writing for The Vancouver Sun, Robert Wiersema states that while "his life is an open book ... [y]ou get the sense of meeting the real Suzuki for the first time." Wiersema calls him "a natural storyteller". The New Zealand Listener review states, "as a writer, he has the charm of a high-school geek desperately trying to get a date ... but ultimately it's what allows his story to convince". Several critics find Suzuki's writing on death to be particularly well-done.

A number of reviewers compared this book with the earlier one, Metamorphosis. The Edmonton Journal considers David Suzuki: The Autobiography to be more candid and insightful than the previous book. On the other hand, Peter Desbarats, writing in Literary Review of Canada, suggests that Metamorphosis had more personal charm. Desbarats is disappointed that The Autobiography does not provide a better reflection on the themes of Metamorphosis. He points out that the best parts, Suzuki's early years, are condensed from one third of Metamorphosis to a single chapter in The Autobiography. Desbarats states that neither book ends with a "satisfying final word" and concludes that Suzuki "is his own worst and most frustrating biographer".
