= Cy Strange =

- Born: June 22, 1914; Maguire, Ontario, Canada
- Died: February 12, 1987 (aged 72); Toronto, Ontario, Canada
- Occupation: broadcaster

Cyril Edward "Cy" Strange (June 22, 1914 – February 12, 1987) was a Canadian radio broadcaster.

Strange grew up in the farming community of Maguire, where his father had a general store. As a youth, Strange worked in the family store. He had his first experiences with radio singing and playing guitar at a radio station in London, Ontario.

Strange started his broadcast career in Toronto where he joined CFRB in 1943 as a journalist. Strange moved to the Canadian Broadcasting Corporation in 1946. He served in a variety of roles for CBC radio and television, including as a host of As It Happens from 1971 to 1973, co-host of Fresh Air for 17 years, and commentary on Science Magazine.
