= Maguire, Ontario =

Coordinates: 43.246869°N 81.511702°W

Maguire was a small agricultural supply based community which formerly stood at what is today the intersection of Adare Drive and Maguire Road, in the municipality of North Middlesex, Ontario Canada, in former McGillivray Township.

== History ==
Maguire was named for local resident William Maguire, a shoemaker, who had originally immigrated to Canada from Enniskillen Ireland in order to escape the economic conditions brought on by the Great Famine of Ireland of 1845–49. Maguire obtained several pieces of property in the vicinity, including one immediately south of the current intersection. A post office was opened in 1882, with Alexander Todd being named as the Postmaster. In 1884, Todd opened a general store on the south-east corner, also during this period, John Ryan operated a blacksmith business nearby. There is evidence to indicate that a log dwelling, or inn, once existed at the northeast corner of the intersection.

Todd operated the store until 1912, when the business was sold to John Strange, father of Cy Strange, who in addition to running the general store, established a sawmill on the property. John Strange also ran the post office until it was closed on December 1, 1913. The general store itself ceased operation in 1920, when the building was converted into a mill and the structure was finally demolished in 1944. During the 1940s, John Hotson built and operated a machine repair shop on the west side of Maguire Road, south of the intersection, opposite the former site of the general store. The remaining structure currently on that location, is not the original Hotson's machine shop, but rather a former church out building relocated from Crediton, Ontario which is now used as a barn. Farther to the south at Ebenezer Cemetery, William and Elizabeth Maguire and Alexander Todd are at rest.

A small memorial plaque commemorating the former existence of the community is located on the east side of Maguire Road, marking the former location of the front steps of the original general store and post office.
