= Bob Joseph =

Canadian Indigenous chief

- K’axwsumala’galis
- Occupations: Author, trainer
- Spouse: Cynthia F. Joseph

Robert "Bob" Joseph is an Indigenous Canadian who inherited a chief's seat in the Gayaxala (Thunderbird) clan, the first clan of the Gwawa'enuxw, one of the eighteen tribes that make up the Kwakwakaʼwakw. His chief name is K’axwsumala’galis, which, loosely translated, means "whale who emerges itself from the water and presents itself to the world."

Bob grew up in Campbell River, British Columbia. As a youngster, he lived on and off the reserve, spending time in Vancouver, Cape Mudge, Lillooet and Kingcomb Inlet, which opens up to the Broughton Archipelago.

== Career ==
Joseph is the founder and president of Indigenous Corporate Training Inc. (ICT), an Indigenous relations firm established in 2022. A Certified Indigenous Business by the Canadian Council for Indigenous Business (CCAB), ICT works to train and guide individuals, communities, and organizations to work and communicate effectively with Indigenous peoples. It was named "Business of the Year" by the BC Achievement Foundation's Indigenous Business Awards in 2021.

Joseph has worked as an associate professor at Royal Roads University and has been routinely featured as a guest lecturer at other academic institutions.

In 2016, Joseph published a viral article on CBC about the Canadian Indian Act, which reached over 55,000 views within the first month, and 500,000 views by 2023. The resulting public attention inspired Joseph to further expand on the topic and write his national bestselling book 21 Things You May Not Know About the Indian Act in 2018.

== Bibliography ==
- Working Effectively with Aboriginal Peoples. (2007). ISBN 978-0-9781628-1-8. Indigenous Relations Press.
- Working Effectively with Indigenous Peoples. (2017). ISBN 978-0-9781628-5-6. Indigenous Relations Press.
- 21 Things You May Not Know About the Indian Act: Helping Canadians Make Reconciliation with Indigenous Peoples a Reality. (2018). ISBN 978-0-9952665-2-0. Indigenous Relations Press & Page Two Books.
- Indigenous Relations: Insight, Tips & Suggestions To Make Reconciliation A Reality. (2019). ISBN 978-1-989025-64-2. Indigenous Relations Press & Page Two Books.
- 21 Things You Need to Know About Indigenous Self-Government: A Conversation About Dismantling the Indian Act. (2025). ISBN 978-1-77458-627-3. Indigenous Relations Press & Page Two Books.

=== Awards ===
- Winner of the Bill Duthie Booksellers’ Choice Award at the B.C. Book Prizes (now the BC & Yukon Book Prizes) for 21 Things You May Not Know About the Indian Act, 2019.
- Finalist for the Bill Duthie Booksellers’ Choice Award at the B.C. Book Prizes (now the BC & Yukon Book Prizes) for Indigenous Relations, 2020.
- Finalist for the Canadian Authors Fred Kerner Award for Indigenous Relations, 2020.
