= Science Magazine (TV program) =

Canadian TV program

- Starring: David Suzuki
- Country of origin: Canada
- Original language: English

Production
- Executive producer: James R. Murray
- Producers: John Bassett; Milan Chvostek; Heather Cook; Diederik d'Ailly
- Running time: 30 minutes

Original release
- Network: CBC
- Release: 13 January 1975 – 15 April 1979

Science Magazine is a half-hour television program produced by CBC Television from 1975 to 1979.

The show was hosted by geneticist David Suzuki, who had previously hosted the daytime youth program Suzuki on Science. Science Magazine moved beyond the youth audience and was mostly broadcast during prime time, except for occasional sessions where the show was repeated in the afternoon.

The program featured news and features on scientific research and developments. Regular items within the show included "How Things Work" and "Science Update". Jan Tennant and Cy Strange of the CBC were the program's film feature narrators.

Science Magazine, as such, ended production when the CBC joined it with The Nature of Things, using the latter as the title and Suzuki as host.
