= Diane Swanson =

Canadian children's writer (1944–2021)

- Born: 5 April 1944; Lethbridge, Alberta
- Died: 19 November 2021 (aged 77)
- Education: University of Alberta
- Occupation: Author
- Children: 2

Diane Swanson (5 April 1944 – 19 November 2021) was a Canadian writer of science books for children. She published over 70 books and was winner of several awards including Parents' Choice Award, Mid-America Publishers Association Award and Orbis Pictus Award.

== Biography ==
Swanson was born and raised in Lethbridge, Alberta. As a child, she and her terrier Sammy would spend summers looking for ladybugs and spiders outside.

She graduated from the University of Alberta with an Honours Bachelor of Arts in the social sciences. She taught in the West Indies for two years. She researched water resources for the Canadian government while living in Ottawa.

Swanson's first book was published when she was 18. She wrote over 70 books and 450 magazine articles.

Swanson lived in Victoria, British Columbia. Her hobbies were hiking, piano-playing, and reading. She was married with two children.

== Reception ==
The Toronto Globe and Mail described Swanson's A Crash of Rhinos, A Party of Jays as providing "a cheerfully educational vantage point from which to view the natural world and its denizens". Booklist called it "part science and part English lesson", deeming it "great for individual or classroom consumption".

The Globe and Mail called The Wonder in Water a "well-laid-out and attractively illustrated book".

Nzong Xiong, writing for The Fresno Bee, described The Dentist & You as an "easy-to-read" book designed to help make dentist visits for children ages 4 to 7 "easier and less fearful". Resource Links found it to be useful for "parents wanting to prepare their children for their first visit to the dentist" or teachers, but found the book "a bit too long and detailed" for the target audience. School Library Journal, however, tagged it as "excellent in relation to other titles on the same subject".

Buffalo Sunrise was called "a full-bodied photo essay" and an "exemplary book" that "ably" recounts the history of the American buffalo by the San Francisco Chronicle. Booklist called it "a useful resource for middle-graders".

Reviewing Alligators and Crocodiles, Frogs and Toads and Penguins from the Welcome to the World of Animals series for the School Library Journal, Arwen Marshall of the Minneapolis Public Library criticized the narrow scope of the books, saying "These serviceable overviews might be useful for brief reports, but they don't cover any new ground." Resource Links found the series to provide "enough information to satisfy [students'] curiosity while also meeting their research needs", recommending the books "for any elementary school library".

== Published works ==
=== Animals Can Be So ... series ===
Title	Published date	Illustrator/Photographer	Publisher	ISBN
Animals Can Be So Speedy	2001		Greystone Books	1-55054-827-1
Animals Can Be So Sleepy	2001		Greystone Books	1-55054-837-9
Animals Can Be So Hard to See	2002		Greystone Books	1-55054-901-4
Animals Can Be So Playful	2002		Greystone Books	1-55054-900-6

=== Canada Close Up series ===
Title	Published date	Illustrator/Photographer	Publisher	ISBN
Canada Close Up: Canada's Bugs	2007		Scholastic Canada	0-43994-673-5

=== Mysterious You series ===
Title	Published date	Illustrator/Photographer	Publisher	ISBN
Hmm?: The Most Interesting Book You'll Ever Read About Memory	2001	Rose Cowles	Kids Can Press	1-55074-595-6
Burp!: The Most Interesting Book You'll Ever Read about Eating	2001	Rose Cowles	Kids Can Press	1-55074-601-4

=== Nature Detectives — The Living World series ===
Title	Published date	Illustrator/Photographer	Publisher	ISBN
The Sixth Street Wetland Detectives	1996	Stuart Duncan	Pacific Edge Publishing	1-89511-044-0
The Cedar Club Forest Detectives	1996	Stuart Duncan	Pacific Edge Publishing	1-89511-042-4
The Central School Seashore Detectives	1996	Terry Smith	Pacific Edge Publishing	1-89511-039-4
The Gibson Park Grassland Detective	1996	Terry Smith	Pacific Edge Publishing	1-89511-041-6
The Kingfisher Camp River Detectives	1998	Judith Rackham	Pacific Edge Publishing	1-89511-054-8

=== True Stories from the Edge series ===
Title	Published date	Illustrator/Photographer	Publisher	ISBN
Tunnels!	2003		Annick Press	1-55037-781-7

=== Up Close series ===
Title	Published date	Illustrator/Photographer	Publisher	ISBN
Up Close: Noses That Plow and Poke	1999		Greystone Books	1-55054-733-X
Up Close: Tails That Talk and Fly	1999		Greystone Books	1-55054-717-8
Up Close: Teeth That Stab and Grind	2000		Greystone Books	1-55054-768-2
Up Close: Feet That Suck and Feed	2000		Greystone Books	1-55054-767-4
Up Close: Skin That Slimes and Scares	2001		Greystone Books	1-55054-817-4
Up Close: Headgear That Hides and Plays	2001		Douglas & McIntyre	1-55054-819-0

=== Welcome to the World series ===
Title	Published date	Illustrator/Photographer	Publisher	ISBN
Welcome to the World of Whales	1996		Whitecap Books	1-55110-490-3
Welcome to the World of Wolves	1996		Whitecap Books	1-55110-491-1
Welcome to the World of Otters	1997		Whitecap Books	1-55110-520-9
Welcome to the World of Bears	1997		Whitecap Books	1-55285-312-8
Welcome to the World of Wild Cats	1997		Whitecap Books	1-55110-615-9
Welcome to the World of Owls	1997		Whitecap Books	1-55110-614-0
Welcome to the World of Eagles	1998		Whitecap Books	1-55110-706-6
Welcome to the World of Foxes	1998		Whitecap Books	1-55110-705-8
Welcome to the World of Raccoons	1998		Whitecap Books	1-55110-782-1
Welcome to the World of Bats	1998		Whitecap Books	1-55110-784-8
Welcome to the World of Beavers	1999		Whitecap Books	1-55110-853-4
Welcome to the World of Moose	1999		Whitecap Books	1-55110-854-2
Welcome to the World of Porcupines	1999		Whitecap Books	1-55110-856-9
Welcome to the World of Skunks	1999		Whitecap Books	1-55110-855-0
Welcome to the World of Rabbits and Hares	2000		Whitecap Books	1-55285-024-2
Welcome to the World of Octopuses	2000		Whitecap Books	1-55285-023-4
Welcome to the World of Squirrels	2001		Whitecap Books	1-55285-259-8
Welcome to the World of Coyotes	2001		Whitecap Books	1-55285-258-X
Welcome to the World of Snakes	2001		Whitecap Books	1-55285-171-0
Welcome to the World of Sharks	2001		Whitecap Books	1-55285-170-2
Welcome to the World of Wild Horses	2002		Whitecap Books	1-55285-321-7
Welcome to the World of Hummingbirds	2002		Whitecap Books	1-55285-319-5
Welcome to the World of Frogs and Toads	2002		Whitecap Books	1-55285-354-3
Welcome to the World of Alligators and Crocodiles	2002		Whitecap Books	1-55285-355-1
Welcome to the Whole World of Elephants	2003		Turtleback Books	0-61378-586-X
Welcome to the Whole World of Penguins	2003		Whitecap Books	1-55285-450-7
Welcome to the World of Kangaroos	2004		Whitecap Books	1-55285-471-X
Welcome to the World of Orangutans	2004		San Val	0-61378-593-2
Welcome to the World of Wolverines	2007		Whitecap Books	1-55285-840-5
Welcome to the World of Spirit Bears	2007		Whitecap Books	1-55285-847-2

=== Other books ===
Authored

Title	Published date	Illustrator/Photographer	Publisher	ISBN
Technology for the Home	1987		British Columbia Ministry of Education	
A Toothy Tongue and One Long Foot: Nature Activities for Kids	1992		Whitecap Books	1-55110-022-3
The Emerald Sea: Exploring the Underwater Wilderness of the Pacific Northwest and Alaska	1993	Dale Sanders	Alaska Northwest Books	0-88240-450-4
Safari Beneath the Sea: The Wonder World of the North Pacific Coast	1994		Demco Media	0-60608-861-X
Sky Dancers: The Amazing World of Canadian Birds	1995	Doug Penhale	Whitecap Books	1-55110-306-0
Buffalo Sunrise: The Story of a North American Giant	1996		Whitecap Books	1-55110-378-8
Bug Bites: Insects Hunting Insects ... and More	1997		Whitecap Books	1-55285-169-9
Animals Eat the Weirdest Things	1998	Terry Smith	Henry Holt and Company (BYR)	0-80505-846-X
The Doctor and You	2001		Annick Press	1-55037-672-1
Nibbling on Einstein's Brain: The Good, the Bad and the Bogus in Science	2001	Warren Clark	Annick Press	1-55037-686-1
The Dentist & You	2002	Rose Cowles	Annick Press	1-55037-729-9
The Balloon Sailors	2003	Krystyna Lipka-Sztarballo	Annick Press	1-55037-809-0
Turn It Loose: The Scientist in Absolutely Everybody	2004	Warren Clark	Annick Press	1-55037-850-3
The Wonder in Water	2005		Annick Press	1-55037-936-4
A Crash of Rhinos, a Party of Jays: The Wacky Ways We Name Animal Groups	2006	Mariko Ando Spencer	Annick Press	1-55451-048-1
Bugs Up Close	2007	Paul Davidson	Kids Can Press	1-55453-138-1
Cheetah Cubs and Beetle Grubs: The Wacky Ways We Name Young Animals	2007	Mariko Ando Spencer	Annick Press	1-55451-083-X
You Are Weird: Your Body's Peculiar Parts and Funny Functions	2009	Kathy Boake	Kids Can Press	1-55453-282-5
Animals Aha!: Thrilling Discoveries in Wildlife Science	2009		Annick Press	1-55451-164-X

Co-authored

Title	Published date	Co-author	Illustrator/Photographer	Publisher	ISBN
Exploring Canada: Learning from the Past	1985	Vivien Bowers		Pgw	0–88894–87
More than Meets the Eye	1989	Vivien Bowers		Pacific Educational Press	0-88865-065-5
Why Seals Blow Their Noses: North American Wildlife in Fact and Fiction	1992	Douglas Penhale	Douglas Penhale	Whitecap Books	1-55110-038-X
Squirts and Snails and Skinny Green Tails : Seashore Nature Activities for Kids	1993	Warren Clark	Warren Clark	Whitecap Books	1-55110-062-2
Coyotes in the Crosswalk: Canadian Wildlife in the City	1994	Douglas Penhale	Douglas Penhale	Whitecap Books	1-55110-140-8
The Day of the Twelve Story Wave: Grinding Glaciers, Howling Hurricanes, Spewing Volcanoes, and Other Awesome Forces of Nature	1995	Laura Cook	Laura Cook	Longstreet Press	1-56352-260-8

== Awards ==
Swanson was recipient of the following awards:

Year	Book	Award	Result
1993	The Emerald Sea	Children's Literature Roundtables of Canada Information Book Award	Short-listed
1994	The Emerald Sea	Bill Duthie Booksellers' Choice Award	Short-listed
1994	The Emerald Sea	B.C. Book Prizes	Short-listed
1995	Why Seals Blow Their Noses	Mid-America Publishers Association Awards	Winner - Best Illustrated Book, one Color
1995	Safari Beneath the Sea	Orbis Pictus Award	Winner - Outstanding Nonfiction for Children
1995	Coyotes in the Crosswalk	Children's Literature Roundtables of Canada Information Book Award	Short-listed
1995	Safari Beneath the Sea	Orbis Pictus Award for Outstanding Nonfiction for Children	Winner
1995	Safari Beneath the Sea	Children's Literature Roundtables of Canada Information Book Award	Short-listed
1995-96	Safari Beneath the Sea	Utah Children's Informational Book Award	Short-listed
1996	Coyotes in the Crosswalk	Silver Birch Award	Short-listed
1997	Buffalo Sunrise	Silver Birch Award	Short-listed
1997	Safari Beneath the Sea	Garden State (New Jersey) Children's Book Award	Short-listed
1997-98	Sky Dancers	B.C. Red Cedar Book Award	Short-listed
1998	Buffalo Sunrise	International Reading Association's Young Adult Choice Award	Short-listed
1998	Bug Bites	Children's Literature Roundtables of Canada Information Book Award	Short-listed
1998	Bug Bites	Ontario Silver Birch Award	Short-listed
1998	Welcome to the World of Bears	Parents' Choice Award, US	Winner
1998	Welcome to the World of Otters	Parents' Choice Award, US	Winner
1999	Animals Eat the Weirdest Things	Mr. Christie's Book Award	Short-listed
1999	Animals Eat the Weirdest Things	Ontario Silver Birch Award	Short-listed
1999	Animals Eat the Weirdest Things	Children's Literature Roundtables of Canada Information Book Award	Short-listed
1999-2000	Bug Bites	B.C. Red Cedar Book Award	Short-listed
2000	Welcome to the World of Moose	B.C. 2000 Book Award	
2000	Welcome to the World of Beavers	B.C. 2000 Book Award	
2000	Welcome to the World of Skunks	B.C. 2000 Book Award	
2000	Welcome to the World of Porcupines	B.C. 2000 Book Award	
2000-01	Animals Eat the Weirdest Things	B.C. Red Cedar Book Award	Short-listed
2001	Animals Eat the Weirdest Things	Rocky Mountain Book Award	Short-listed
2001	White Raven	Los Angeles' 100 Best Books	
2002	White Raven	Voice of Youth Advocates (VOYA), American Library Association	Non-fiction honor list
2002	Hm?	Ontario Silver Birch Award	Short-listed
2002	Hm?	Informal Education Product of the Year Award for Linguistic Intelligence	Winner
2002	Burp!	Children's Literature Roundtables of Canada Information Book Award	Short-listed
2002	White Raven	Science in Society Award	Short-listed
2002-03	Burp!	Rocky Mountain Award	Short-listed
2002-03	Burp!	Atlantic Provinces Hackmatack Award	Short-listed
2002-03	Hm?	Ontario Silver Birch Award	Short-listed
2003-04	Hm?	B.C. Red Cedar Book Award	Short-listed
2003-04	Up Close: Skin That Slimes and Scares	B.C. Red Cedar Book Award	Short-listed
2003-04	Nibbling on Einstein's Brain	B.C. Red Cedar Book Award	Short-listed
2004-05	Tunnels! True stories from the edge	Hackmatack Award	Winner
2006-07	The Wonder in Water	Silver Birch Award	Short-listed
2006-07	Turn It Loose	Red Cedar Award	Short-listed
2008	Bugs Up Close	Silver Birch Express Award	Finalist
2008	Bugs Up Close	Children's Literature Roundtables of Canada Information Book Award	Finalist

== Other memberships ==
CWILL B.C. Canadian Children's Book Centre
