= The Sacred Balance =

1997 book by David Suzuki

- First edition
- Author: David Suzuki; Amanda McConnell
- Subject: Sustainability
- Publisher: Greystone Books
- Publication date: 1997
- Pages: 259
- ISBN: 978-1-55054-548-7
- OCLC: 77775283

The Sacred Balance is a book by environmentalist David Suzuki, which is in its second edition as of 2007. The book explores human society's impact on the natural world, both for the planet and the people living on it. Suzuki reveals how dependent humankind is upon the planet's water, soil, sunlight, and the breath of its vegetation. Threats to the planet's balance, ranging from toxic pollution to global warming are also discussed.

A series of documentary films, also called The Sacred Balance, is based on the book produced by Kensington Communications, Inc. Producer Robert Lang was the producer of the series.
