= David Suzuki =

Canadian scientist and environmentalist (born 1936)

David Suzuki CC OBC FRSC
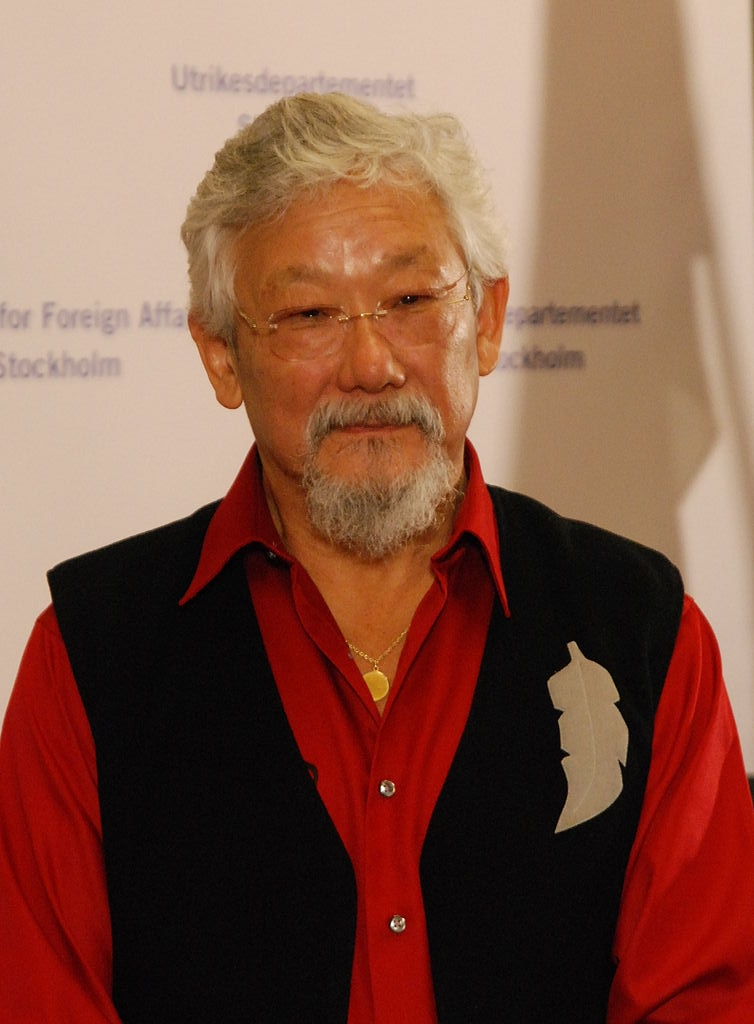
- Suzuki in December 2009
- Born: David Takayoshi Suzuki; March 24, 1936 (age 90); Vancouver, British Columbia, Canada
- Education: Amherst College (BA); University of Chicago (PhD)
- Spouse(s): Setsuko Joane Sunahara (m. 1958; div. 1965) Tara Elizabeth Cullis (m. 1973)
- Children: 5, including Severn
- Awards: Order of Canada, (OC 1976, CC 2006); UNESCO's Kalinga Prize (1986); Right Livelihood Award (2009)
- Scientific career
- Workplaces: University of British Columbia
- Thesis: Interchromosomal effects on crossing over in Drosophila melanogaster (1961)
- Doctoral advisor: Bill Baker
- Other academic advisors: Bill Hexter; Dan Lindsley

David Takayoshi Suzuki (born March 24, 1936) is a Canadian academic, science broadcaster, and environmental activist. Suzuki earned a PhD in zoology from the University of Chicago in 1961, and was a professor in the genetics department at the University of British Columbia from 1963 until his retirement in 2001. Since the mid-1970s, Suzuki has been known for his television and radio series, documentaries and books about nature and the environment. He was the host and narrator of the long-running CBC Television science program The Nature of Things until his retirement in 2023.

A longtime activist to reverse global climate change, Suzuki co-founded the David Suzuki Foundation in 1990. The Foundation's priorities are oceans and sustainable fishing, climate change and clean energy, sustainability, and Suzuki's Nature Challenge. The Foundation also works on ways to help protect the oceans from large oil spills such as the Deepwater Horizon oil spill. Suzuki also served as a director of the Canadian Civil Liberties Association from 1982 to 1987. He has frequently criticized governments for their lack of action to protect the environment.

Suzuki was awarded the Right Livelihood Award in 2009. His 2011 book The Legacy won the Nautilus Book Award. He is a Companion of the Order of Canada. In 2004, Suzuki ranked fifth on the list of final nominees in a CBC television series that asked viewers to select The Greatest Canadian of all time.

== Early life ==
David Suzuki has a twin sister, Marcia, and two other siblings, Geraldine (now known as Aiko) and Dawn. He was born in 1936 to Setsu Nakamura and Kaoru Carr Suzuki in Vancouver, British Columbia, where his parents were also born. Suzuki's maternal and paternal grandparents immigrated to Canada at the beginning of the 20th century from Hiroshima Prefecture and Aichi Prefecture, respectively.

A third-generation Japanese Canadian ("Canadian Sansei"), Suzuki's family suffered internment in British Columbia early during the Second World War until after the war ended in 1945. In June 1942, the government sold the Suzuki family's dry cleaning business, then interned Suzuki, his mother, and two sisters in a camp at Slocan in the British Columbia Interior. His father had been sent to a labour camp in Solsqua in the Southern Interior region of BC two months earlier. His sister Dawn was born in the internment camp.

After the war, Suzuki's family, like other Japanese Canadian families, were forced to move east of the Rockies. They moved around Ontario, from Etobicoke, Leamington, and eventually to London. In interviews, Suzuki has consistently credited his father for having interested him in and sensitized him to nature.

Suzuki attended Mill Street Elementary School and Grade 9 at Leamington District Secondary School before moving to London, Ontario, where he attended London Central Secondary School.

== Academic career ==
Suzuki received his Bachelor of Arts degree in biology in 1958 from Amherst College in Massachusetts, where he first developed an interest in genetics, and his Doctor of Philosophy degree in zoology from the University of Chicago in 1961. From 1961 to 1962, he worked at Oak Ridge National Laboratory. From 1962 to 1963, he was an assistant professor at the University of Alberta. He was a professor in the genetics department at the University of British Columbia from 1963 until his retirement in 2001, and has since been professor emeritus at a university research institute.

Early in his research career he studied genetics using the popular model organism Drosophila melanogaster (fruit flies). To be able to use his initials in naming any new genes he found, he studied dominant temperature-sensitive (DTS) phenotypes. He jokingly noted at a lecture at Johns Hopkins University that the only alternative subject was "(damn) tough skin."

== Broadcasting career ==
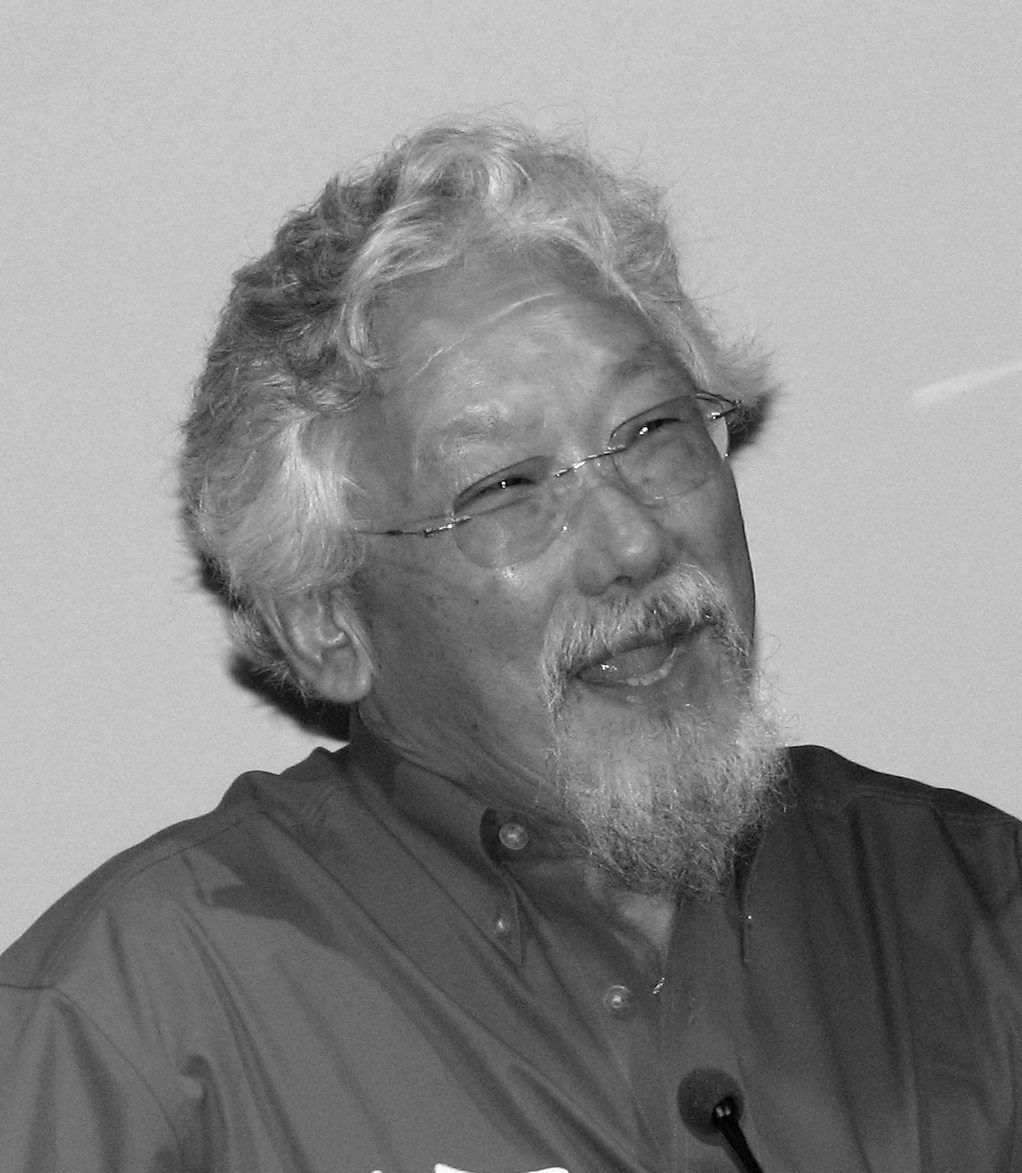
Suzuki in 2006

Suzuki began in television on January 10, 1971, with the weekly informational show Suzuki on Science. In 1974, he founded the radio program Quirks & Quarks, which he also hosted on CBC AM radio (the forerunner of CBC Radio One) from 1975 to 1979. Throughout the 1970s, he also hosted Science Magazine, a weekly program geared towards an adult audience.

From 1979 to 2023, Suzuki hosted The Nature of Things, a CBC television series that has aired in nearly 50 countries. In this program, Suzuki aims to stimulate interest in the natural world, point out threats to human well-being and wildlife habitat, and present alternatives to humanity for achieving a more sustainable society. He has been a prominent proponent of renewable energy sources and the soft energy path.

Suzuki was the host of the critically acclaimed 1993 PBS series The Secret of Life. His 1985 series A Planet for the Taking averaged more than 1.8 million viewers per episode and earned him a United Nations Environment Programme Medal. His perspective in this series is summed up in his statement: "We have both a sense of the importance of the wilderness and space in our culture and an attitude that it is limitless and therefore we needn't worry." He concludes with a call for a major "perceptual shift" in our relationship with nature and the wild.

Suzuki's The Sacred Balance, a book first published in 1997 and later made into a five-hour mini-series on Canadian public television, was broadcast in 2002. Suzuki is now taking part in an advertisement campaign with the tagline "You have the power", promoting energy conservation through various household alternatives, such as the use of compact fluorescent lightbulbs.

For the Discovery Channel, Suzuki also produced "Yellowstone to Yukon: The Wildlands Project" in 1997. The conservation-biology based documentary focused on Dave Foreman's Wildlands Project, which considers how to create corridors between and buffer zones around large wilderness reserves as a means to preserve biological diversity. Foreman developed this project after leaving Earth First! (which he co-founded) in 1990. The conservation biologists Michael Soulé and Reed Noss were also directly involved.

In October 2022, Suzuki announced his retirement from The Nature of Things series in spring 2023, to be replaced as host by Sarika Cullis-Suzuki, his daughter, and Anthony Morgan.

== Climate change activism ==
Suzuki in conversation with Silver Donald Cameron about his work

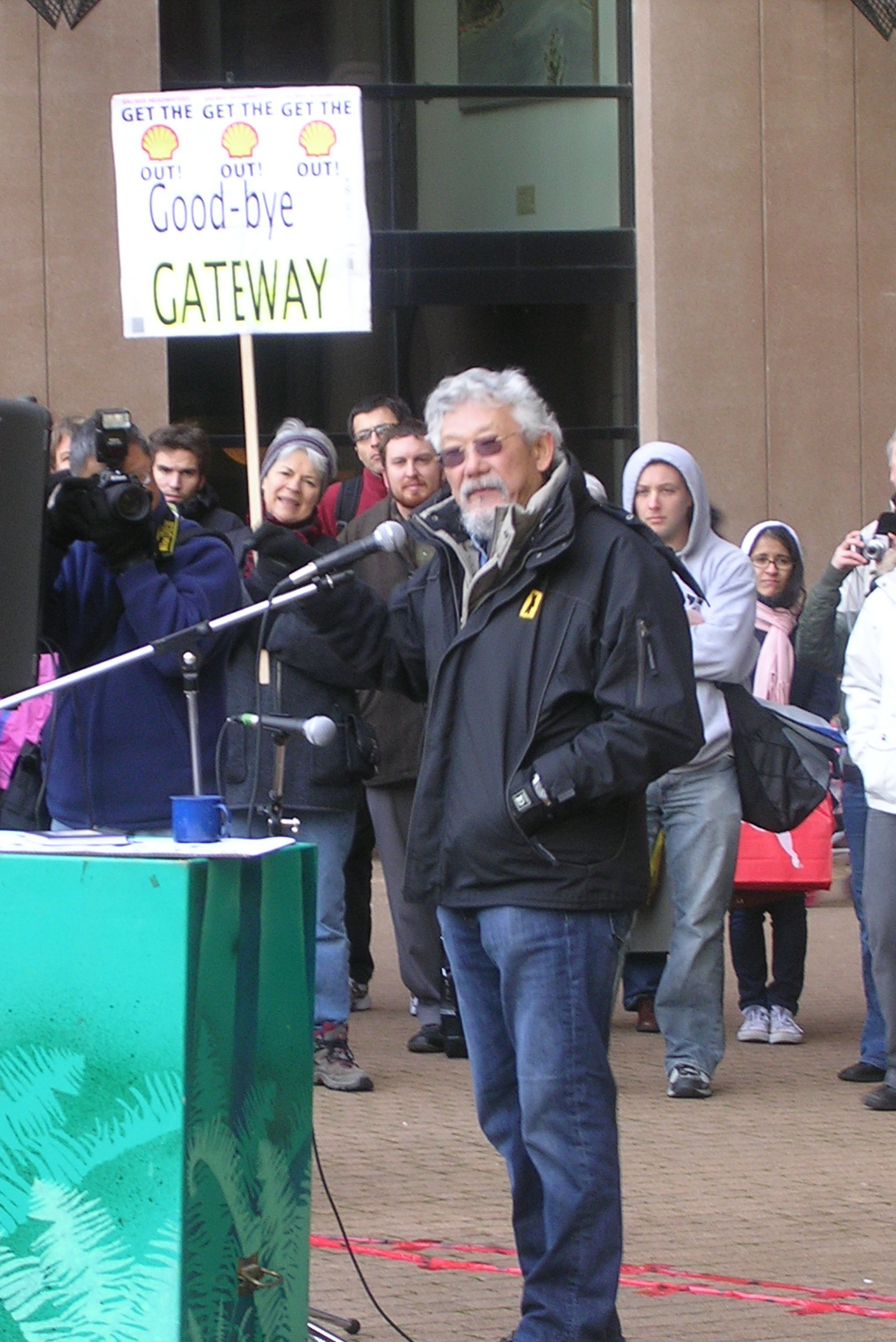
Suzuki spoke at the 2007 Global Day of Action event in Vancouver, B.C. The sign in the background refers to the Greater Vancouver Gateway Program.

In February 2008, Suzuki urged McGill University students to speak out against politicians who fail to act on climate change, saying, "What I would challenge you to do is to put a lot of effort into trying to see whether there's a legal way of throwing our so-called leaders into jail because what they're doing is a criminal act."

Suzuki is unequivocal that climate change is a very real and pressing problem and that an "overwhelming majority of scientists" now agree that human activity is responsible. The David Suzuki Foundation website has a clear statement of this:

The debate is over about whether or not climate change is real. Irrefutable evidence from around the world—including extreme weather events, record temperatures, retreating glaciers, and rising sea levels—all point to the fact climate change is happening now and at rates much faster than previously thought.

The overwhelming majority of scientists who study climate change agree that human activity is responsible for changing the climate. The United Nations Intergovernmental Panel on Climate Change (IPCC) is one of the largest bodies of international scientists ever assembled to study a scientific issue, involving more than 2,500 scientists from more than 130 countries. The IPCC has concluded that most of the warming observed during the past 50 years is attributable to human activities. Its findings have been publicly endorsed by the National Academies of Science of all G8 nations, as well as those of China, India and Brazil.

Suzuki says that despite this growing consensus, many in the public and the media seemed doubtful about the science for many years. The reason for the confusion about climate change, in Suzuki's view, was an organized campaign of disinformation about the science involved. "A very small number of critics" denies that climate change exists and that humans are the cause. These climate change deniers, Suzuki says, tend not to be climate scientists and do not publish in peer-reviewed scientific journals but rather target the media, the general public, and policy makers. Their goal: "delaying action on climate change." According to Suzuki, deniers have received significant funding from coal and oil companies, including ExxonMobil. They are linked to "industry-funded lobby groups", such as the Information Council on the Environment (ICE), whose aim is to "reposition global warming as theory (not fact)."

Suzuki is a "messenger" / ambassador for the environmental organization 350.org advocating for cutting CO_{2} emissions and creating climate solutions.

Suzuki has supported ecocide becoming a crime at the International Criminal Court, saying, "Ecocide is not only a crime against life, it is suicidal for us because we are the apex predator that is utterly dependent on nature's services."

Suzuki has attracted criticism for maintaining a lifestyle with a substantial carbon footprint while proselytizing against carbon emissions. Suzuki himself laments that in travelling constantly to spread his message of climate responsibility, he has ended up "over his [carbon] limit by hundreds of tonnes." He says he has stopped vacationing overseas, and aims to "cluster" his speaking engagements together to reduce his carbon footprint. He would prefer, he says, to appear solely by video conference.

Suzuki has engaged in a critique of political economy claiming that the contemporary discipline of economics entirely fails to account for the environment, hyperbolically saying, "conventional economics is a form of brain damage". In 2021, he said that pipelines would be "blown up" if climate action was not taken; he later apologized.

During a media interview in July 2025, Suzuki said it was "too late" to solve the climate crisis:

I've never said this before to the media, but it's too late. I say that because I go by science and Johan Rockström, the Swedish scientist who heads the Potsdam Institute, has defined nine planetary boundaries. These are constraints on how we live.

Suzuki went on to explain that humanity had crossed the seventh boundary earlier in 2025, leaving no options to avert catastrophe. He added that humankind should begin preparing for more severe and destructive natural disasters.

== Social commentary ==
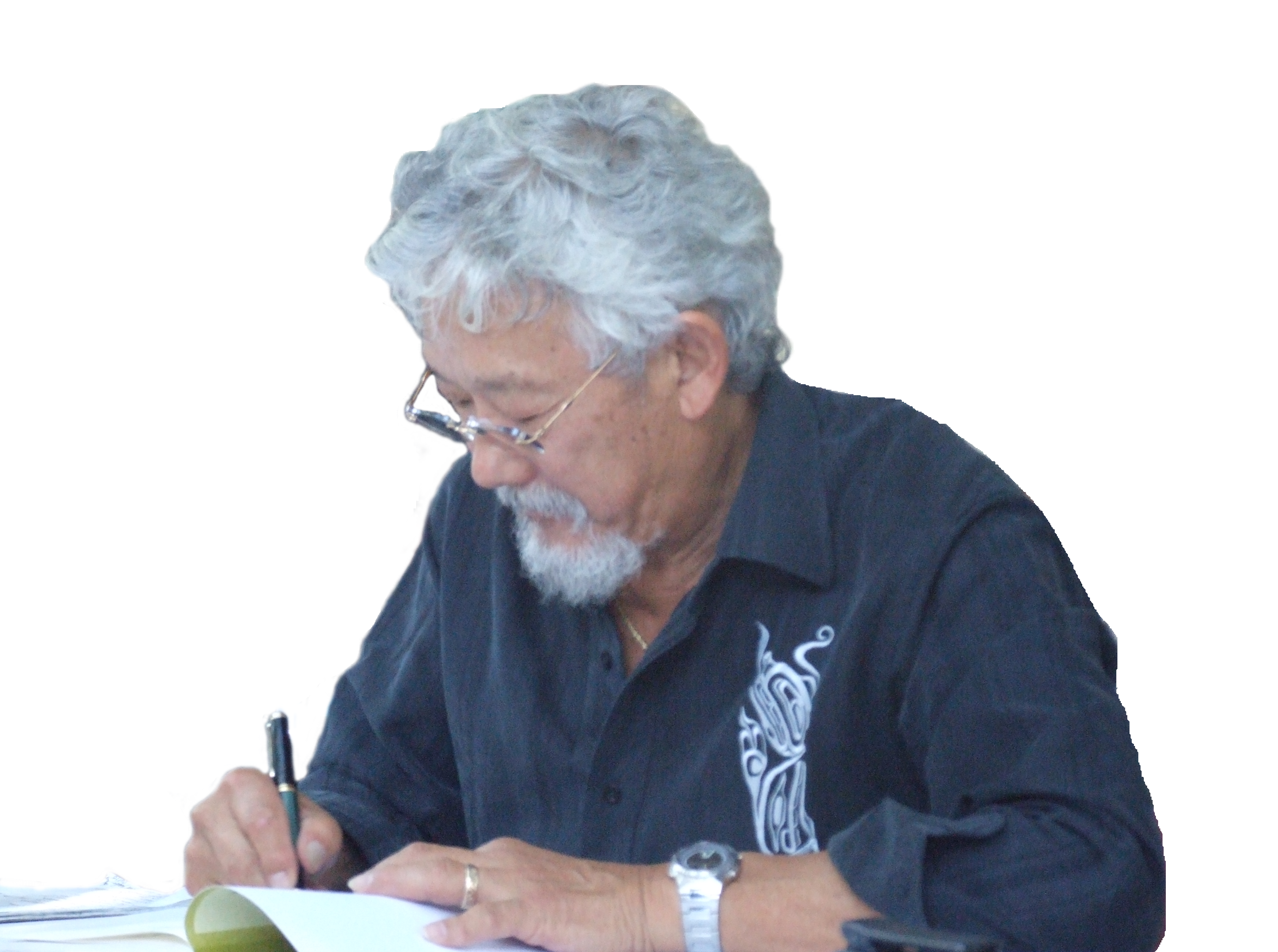
Suzuki signing a copy of his work

=== Genetically modified crops ===
Suzuki has been criticized for his statements about the safety of genetically modified crops. Suzuki has written that "products of biotechnology are being rammed into our food, onto our fields and into our medicines, without any public participation in discussions and with the complicity, indeed, the active support and funding of governments. But there are profound health, ecological and economic ramifications of this activity." In a 1999 CP Wire article, Suzuki is quoted as saying: "Any politician or scientist who tells you these products are safe is either very stupid or lying." In an interview with CBC TV, Suzuki argues that the science showing GMOs are safe is "very, very bad science" and that the commercialization of GMOs is "driven by money." In 2012, his foundation's website included an "Understanding GMO" page that said, "the safety of GMO foods is unproven and a growing body of research connects these foods with health concerns."

=== Fukushima ===
In a 2013 speech on water policy at the University of Alberta, Suzuki claimed that a second emergency at the Fukushima Daiichi Nuclear Power Plant would require the evacuation of the North American west coast. Three months later, he admitted that his comment was "off-the-cuff." But he still speculates that another earthquake could trigger a new nuclear disaster in Fukushima, as the Japanese Atomic Energy Commission paper he cited in his speech states that such a disaster could call for the evacuation of over 10 million Japanese residents.

=== Immigration ===
In 2013, in the French news magazine L'Express, Suzuki called Canada's immigration policy "disgusting" (We "plunder southern countries to deprive them of their future leaders, and wish to increase our population to support economic growth") and insisted that "Canada is full" ("Our useful area is reduced").

=== Canadian justice system ===
While being interviewed by Tony Jones on Australia's ABC TV network in September 2013, Suzuki repeated the claim from Canadian media that the Harper government was building prisons even though crime rates were declining in Canada. He suggested that the prisons might be being built so that Stephen Harper could incarcerate environmental activists. Jean-Christophe De Le Rue, a spokesman for Public Safety Minister Steven Blaney, denied the claims, emphasizing that the Canadian government was not building prisons and had no plans to do so. But in 2011, the Harper government announced a five-year, "$2-billion federal prison-building boom" to add "over 2,700 beds to men's and women's prisons across Canada", with $517 million already "spent on prison construction" in 2010–2011.

=== Politics ===
Over the years, Suzuki has endorsed Green Party and New Democratic Party candidates in various federal and provincial elections.

According to Suzuki, Justin Trudeau called him in 2015 to ask for his endorsement of the Liberal platform on climate change. Upon pointed questioning by Suzuki, the conversation turned "nasty", with Trudeau saying, "I don't have to listen to this sanctimonious crap", at which time Suzuki "proceeded to call him a twerp".

In 2026, Suzuki endorsed Avi Lewis in that year's federal NDP leadership race.

== Personal life ==
Suzuki was married to Setsuko Joane Sunahara from 1958 to 1965; the couple had three children. In 1973, Suzuki married Tara Elizabeth Cullis, with whom he had two daughters, one of whom is Severn Cullis-Suzuki. As of 2022, he has ten grandchildren, including snowboarder and filmmaker Tamo Campos. His cousin's grandchildren are Montreal Canadiens captain Nick Suzuki, and Carolina Hurricanes player Ryan Suzuki. Suzuki is an atheist.

== Awards and honours ==
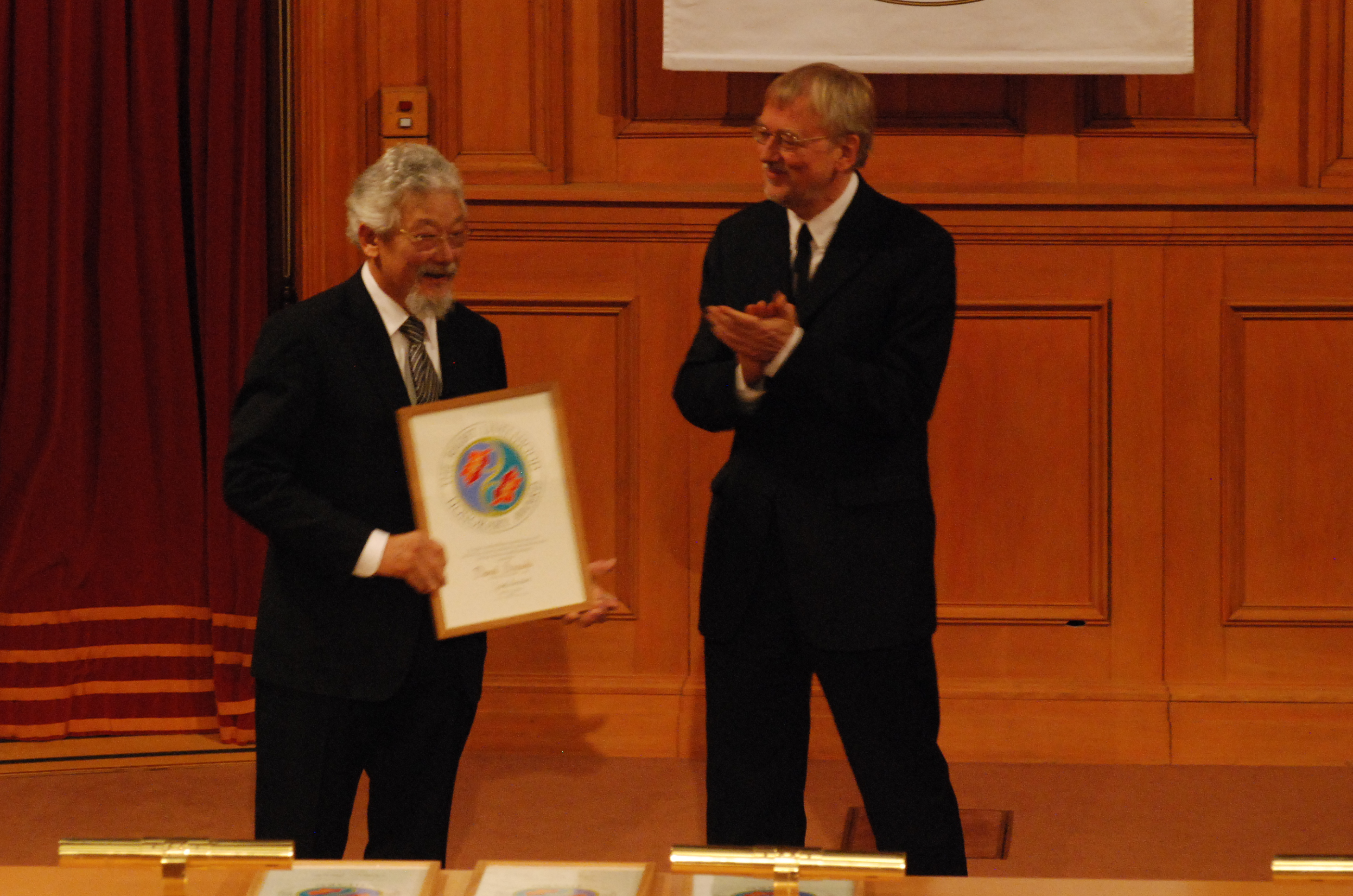
Suzuki receives the Right Livelihood Award from Jakob von Uexküll.

- Suzuki is an appointee to the Order of Canada, first as an Officer (1976), then upgraded to Companion status in (2006), the Order of British Columbia (1995), and is the recipient of UNESCO's Kalinga Prize for the Popularization of Science (1986) and a long list of Canadian and international honours.
- Canadian version of the Queen Elizabeth II Silver Jubilee Medal in 1977.
- 125th Anniversary of the Confederation of Canada Medal in 1992.
- Canadian version of the Queen Elizabeth II Golden Jubilee Medal in 2002.
- Canadian version of the Queen Elizabeth II Diamond Jubilee Medal in 2012.
- In 2004, Suzuki was nominated as one of the top ten "Greatest Canadians" by viewers of the CBC. In the final vote he ranked fifth, making him the greatest living Canadian. Suzuki said that his own vote was for Tommy Douglas who was the eventual winner.
- In 2006, Suzuki was the recipient of the Bradford Washburn Award presented at the Museum of Science in Boston, Massachusetts.
- In 2007, Suzuki was honoured by Global Exchange, with the International Human Rights Award.
- In 2009, Suzuki was awarded the honorary Right Livelihood Award.
- He was the subject of Sturla Gunnarsson's 2010 documentary film Force of Nature: The David Suzuki Movie.
- On June 23, 2015, Suzuki was awarded the Freedom of the City by the Vancouver City Council, which entitled him to the title Freeman of the City of Vancouver.
- In 2018, Suzuki was awarded the Lifetime Achievement Award from the American Humanist Association.

=== Honorary degrees ===
Suzuki has been awarded honorary degrees from many universities.

| Location | Date | School | Degree |
|---|---|---|---|
| Prince Edward Island | 1974 | University of Prince Edward Island | Doctor of Laws (LL.D) |
| Ontario | June 1979 | University of Windsor | Doctor of Science (D.Sc.) |
| Nova Scotia | 1979 | Acadia University | Doctor of Science (D.Sc.) |
| Ontario | Fall 1981 | Trent University | Doctor of Laws (LL.D) |
| Alberta | 1986 | University of Calgary | Doctor of Laws (LL.D) |
| Illinois | 1986 | Governors State University | Doctor of Humane Letters (DHL) |
| Ontario | 1986 | Lakehead University | Doctor of Science (D.Sc.) |
| Ontario | June 1987 | McMaster University | Doctor of Science (D.Sc.) |
| Ontario | 1987 | Queen's University | Doctor of Laws (LL.D) |
| Ontario | 1987 | Carleton University | Doctor of Science (D.Sc.) |
| Massachusetts | 1989 | Amherst College | Doctor of Science (D.Sc.) |
| Queensland | 16 April 1997 | Griffith University | Doctor of the University (D.Univ) |
| Washington | 1999 | Whitman College | Doctor of Science (D.Sc.) |
| Maine | 2000 | Unity College | Doctor of Environmental Science |
| British Columbia | 2000 | Simon Fraser University | Doctor of Laws (LL.D) |
| Ontario | Spring 2005 | York University | Doctor of Science (D.Sc.) |
| Quebec | 2005 | Université du Québec à Montréal | Doctor of Science (D.Sc.) |
| South Australia | 2005 | Flinders University | Doctor of Science (D.Sc.) |
| Ontario | 2007 | Ryerson University | Doctor of Communications |
| Quebec | 2007 | Université de Montréal | Doctor of Science (D.Sc.) |
| Ontario | 10 August 2007 | University of Western Ontario | Doctor of Science (D.Sc.) |
| Ontario | 2008 | Lambton College | Diploma in Alternative Energy Engineering Technology |
| Newfoundland and Labrador | May 2009 | Memorial University of Newfoundland | Doctor of Science (D.Sc.) |
| Nova Scotia | 2010 | Université Sainte-Anne | Doctorate |
| Quebec | 2011 | Université Laval | Doctor of Communications |
| British Columbia | 25 November 2011 | University of British Columbia | Doctor of Science (D.Sc.) |
| Ontario | June 2012 | University of Guelph | Doctor of Laws (LL.D) |
| Manitoba | 2015 | University of Winnipeg | Doctor of Science (D.Sc.) |
| Alberta | 7 June 2018 | University of Alberta | Doctor of Science (D.Sc.) |
| Nova Scotia | 2021 | Atlantic School of Theology | Doctor of Divinity (D.D) |

== Publications ==
Suzuki is the author of 52 books (nineteen for children), including David Suzuki: The Autobiography, Tree: A Life Story, The Sacred Balance, Genethics, Wisdom of the Elders, Inventing the Future, and the best-selling Looking At Senses a series of children's science books. This is a partial list of publications by Suzuki:

- Sciencescape – The Nature of Canada (1986) – with Hans Blohm and Marjorie Harris
- Pebbles to Computers: The Thread (1986) – with Hans Blohm and Stafford Beer
- Metamorphosis: Stages in a life (1987) ISBN 0-773-72139-8
- Genethics: The Clash between the New Genetics and Human Values (1990)
- It's a Matter of Survival (1991) ISBN 0-674-46970-4
- Time to Change (1994)
- The Japan We Never Knew: A Journey of Discovery (1997) – with Keibo Oiwa
- The Sacred Balance (1997)
- From Naked Ape to Superspecies: A Personal Perspective on Humanity and the Global Ecocrisis (1999) – with Holly Dressel. ISBN 0-773-73194-6
  - From Naked Ape to Superspecies: Humanity and the Global Eco-Crisis, (2nd edition 2004) – with Holly Dressel. ISBN 1-553-65031-X
- Good News for a Change: Hope for a Troubled Planet (2001) – with Holly Dressel. ISBN 0-773-73307-8
- More Good News (2003)
  - More Good News: Real Solutions to the Global Eco-Crisis (Revised ed. 2010) – with Holly Dressel. ISBN 1-553-65475-7
- David Suzuki: The Autobiography (2006)
- David Suzuki's Green Guide (2008) – with David Boyd
- The Big Picture: Reflections on Science, Humanity, and a Quickly Changing Planet (2009) – with David Taylor
- The Legacy: An Elder's vision for a sustainable future (2010) – with foreword by Margaret Atwood
- Letters to My Grandchildren (2015) ISBN 978-1771640886
- Force of Nature: The David Suzuki Movie (2010), 93-minute documentary DVD (210616DV)

== See also ==
- Conservation biology
- Environmentalism

== Sources ==
- John C. Phillipson et al. "David Takayoshi Suzuki" in The Canadian Encyclopedia: Year 2000 Edition, James Marsh, ed. Toronto: McClelland and Stewart, 1999. p. 2277. ISBN 0-7710-2099-6
