= Peter Macnair =

Peter Livesay Macnair is a Canadian anthropologist.

From 1965 until 1996 Macnair was the Curator of Ethnology at the Royal British Columbia Museum. During this time he was responsible for ground-breaking work in museum anthropology and the participation of aboriginal peoples in the creation of museum exhibits.

Since his retirement from the Royal British Columbia Museum, Macnair has been as active as ever and has curated exhibits for the Vancouver Art Gallery, The Art Gallery of Greater Victoria and the National Museum of the American Indian.

== Selected works ==
- The Legacy: Tradition and Innovation in Northwest Coast Indian Art (1983)
- The Magic Leaves: A History of Haida Argillite Carving (1984)
- Down from the Shimmering Sky: Masks of the Northwest Coast (1998)
- To the Totem Forests: Emily Carr and Contemporaries Interpret Coastal Villages (1999)
- Listening to the Ancestors : The Art of Native Life in the Pacific Northwest (2005)
