= Before I Wake (Wiersema novel) =

2006 novel by Robert J. Wiersema

- First edition
- Author: Robert J. Wiersema
- Language: English
- Genre: Novel
- Publisher: Random House Canada
- Publication date: 2006
- Publication place: Canada
- Media type: Print
- Pages: 384 pp
- ISBN: 978-0-679-31373-1
- OCLC: 67400198

Before I Wake (2006) is a novel by Robert J. Wiersema. The events of the novel take place in Victoria, British Columbia, Canada.

== Plot summary ==
The novel is set in Victoria, British Columbia. A car accident leaves three-year-old Sherry Barrett in a coma. As her parents struggle to deal with the aftermath of the accident, word spreads that anyone who comes into contact with her will be miraculously cured of illnesses. As interest in Sherry intensifies, she becomes the focus of attention not only from pilgrims seeking healing, but of religious figures who accuse the Barretts of exploiting their daughter for gain. There is a fantastical aspect to some of the characters who intrude into the lives of the Barretts, and even Henry Denton, the driver of the vehicle that struck Sherry, trying to deal with his remorse, becomes trapped in limbo, which in this case is found in the Victoria Public Library.

== Characters ==
Sherilyn "Sherry" Barrett
A three-year-old girl who was struck in a hit and run and is left comatose.
Simon Barrett
Sherry's father, a lawyer.
Karen Barrett
Sherry's mother, homemaker.
Henry Denton
A man who was driving the truck that struck Sherry.
Mary
A young associate at Simon's firm with whom he is romantically involved.

== Reception ==
Quill & Quire described Before I Wake as an "engrossing and carefully plotted" bestseller similar to his 2009 novella, The World More Full of Weeping; adding that both are "literary/supernatural hybrids about families in crisis, with children at their cores." Kirkus Reviews called it "An engaging and unusual story—a debut with promise."
