= Suzuki on Science =

- Genre: science
- Presented by: David Suzuki
- Narrated by: Bruno Cimolai
- Country of origin: Canada
- Original language: English
- No. of seasons: 1

Production
- Producer: Keith Christie
- Production location: Vancouver
- Running time: 30 minutes

Original release
- Network: CBC Television
- Release: 10 January 1971 – 26 March 1972

Suzuki on Science is a Canadian science television program that aired on CBC Television from 1971 to 1972.

== Premise ==
This marked the debut of University of British Columbia science professor David Suzuki as a television program host and launched his career as a Canadian scientific broadcaster. This program on scientific subjects was produced by CBC Vancouver, with the initial pilot episodes reflecting Suzuki's specialty of genetics. Later episodes concerned other areas of science.

== Scheduling ==
This half-hour program began with a pilot run on Sundays at 2:00 p.m. (Eastern time) from 10 January to 14 February 1971. Another run was broadcast in the same time slot from 28 March to 27 June 1971. It continued in a Monday 10:00 p.m. time slot from 12 July to 20 September 1971. The final series run returned to its original Sunday afternoon time slot from 9 January to 26 March 1972.
