= Duthie Books =

Defunct bookstore chain in Vancouver, Canada

Coordinates: 49°16′5″N 123°9′23″W

Duthie Books was a chain of bookstores operating in Vancouver from 1957 to 2010.

== History ==
Duthie Books was founded by Bill Duthie in 1957. The first store opened on Robson Street near the public library. The stores were run by his three children – Cathy, Celia, and David – following his death in 1984.

The shop had then expanded to locations on W. 10th Avenue, Seymour Street, Hastings Street, and the Arbutus Village by the time of Duthie's death. A series of expansions through the 1990s led to a peak of ten shops throughout the city, but also left the bookseller in poor financial condition.

The company declared bankruptcy in 1999. The only store remaining open at 2239 West 4th Avenue closed in January 2010.
