= Robert Wiersema =

Canadian writer (born 1970)

Robert J. Wiersema (born 1970) is a Canadian writer. Since 2006, he's published two novels, a novella and a non-fiction book about Bruce Springsteen.

== Life and career ==
Wiersema was born in Agassiz, British Columbia, in 1970. After high school, he attended the University of Victoria, graduating with an Honours Degree in English Literature.

His first novel, Before I Wake, was published by Random House in August 2006. His second novel, Bedtime Story, was published in November 2010, also by Random House. His novella, The World More Full of Weeping, was published by ChiZine Publications in September 2009.

Wiersema lives in Victoria, British Columbia.

== Bibliography ==
=== Fiction ===
Robert J. Wiersema talks about Bedtime Story on Bookbits radio.

- Before I Wake (2006)
- The World More Full of Weeping (2009)
- Bedtime Story (2010)
- Black Feathers (2015)
- Seven Crow Stories (2016)

=== Non-fiction ===
- Walk Like A Man: Coming of Age with the Music of Bruce Springsteen (2011)
