= Smaro Kamboureli =

Canadian poet and scholar

Smaro Kamboureli is a Canadian poet and scholar who currently is a professor of English at the University of Toronto, where she also sits as the Avie Bennett Chair in Canadian Literature. She previously taught English and was the Director of the TransCanada Institute at the University of Guelph.

Kamboureli was awarded a Canada Research Chair (Tier 1) in Critical Studies in Canadian Literature in 2005. Before joining the University of Guelph, she taught for many years at the University of Victoria where she was Director of the English graduate program and the first Associate Dean—Research.

Her publications include in the second person (Longspoon 1985), On the Edge of Genre: The Contemporary Canadian Long Poem (1991), Making a Difference: Canadian Multicultural Literature (1996), and a new edition of it, Making a Difference: Multicultural Literatures in English Canada (2006). Her book, Scandalous Bodies: Diasporic Literature in English Canada (2000), which won the Gabrielle Roy Prize for Canadian Criticism, has just gone out of print, but is available on the TransCanada Institute's web site.

On the board of NeWest Press (Edmonton) since 1981, she is the founder and editor of The Writer as Critic series, which includes, among others, Douglas Barbour's Lyric/Anti-lyric: Essays on Contemporary Poetry, Frank Davey's Canadian Literary Power, Daphne Marlatt's Readings from the Labyrinth, Fred Wah's Faking It: Poetics and Hybridity, Phyllis Webb's Nothing But Brush Strokes, and, most recently, Di Brandt's So This Is the World & Here I Am in It. She has also reissued, with corrections, Roy Kiyooka's Transcanada Letters and edited his posthumous Pacific Rim Letters, with an afterword and a chronology of his life. In collaboration with Roy Miki, she organized "TransCanada: Literature, Institutions, Citizenship" (Vancouver, June 2005), a conference intended to spearhead a critical look at the institutional structures that inform the making and study of CanLit, as well as collaborative projects to be sponsored by the TransCanada Institute. Trans.Can.Lit: Resituating the Study of Canadian Literature, a collection of essays presented at the conference, and edited by Kamboureli and Roy Miki, will appear in 2007 (Wilfrid Laurier University Press).

== Bibliography ==
- In the Second Person – 1985
- A Mazing Space: Writing Canadian Women Writing – 1986
- On the Edge of Genre: The Contemporary Canadian Long Poem – 1991
- Making a Difference: Canadian Multicultural Literature – 1996
- Scandalous Bodies: Diasporic Literature in English Canada – 2000
