= Arrhythmia (novel) =

2011 novel by Alice Zorn

- Author: Alice Zorn
- Language: English
- Genre: Novel
- Publisher: NeWest Press
- Publication date: May 1, 2011
- Publication place: Canada
- Media type: Print (hardcover & paperback)
- Pages: 315
- ISBN: 978-1-897126-80-6

Arrhythmia is the first novel by Canadian author Alice Zorn. It was published on May 1, 2011 by NeWest Press.

== Characters ==
- Joelle - A protagonist of the novel. She is married to Marc and watches her marriage fall apart. She works as a secretary at the hospital.
- Marc - Joelle's husband, who also works at the hospital, and becomes obsessed with Ketia. They have secret rendezvous without Joelle knowing.
- Ketia - A nurse who works at the hospital who begins a liaison with Marc. She has two younger siblings and lives with her mother.
- Diane - Joelle's best friend who is in a relationship with Nazim. She loves crossword puzzles and can do them very quickly.
- Nazim - Diane's live-in boyfriend who is Muslim. Nazim had never told his family about Diane, and he receives a letter from his sister Ghada saying that she will be coming to visit him in Canada.
- Gabrielle - Ketia's younger sister.
- Bastien - Ketia's younger brother.
- "Ma" - Ketia's mother.
- Frank - A doctor whom Joelle works with at the hospital.
- Emile - A former abusive boyfriend of Joelle who arrives at the hospital with a serious illness.
- Ghada - Nazim's sister who is educated, unlike the remaining members of their family.

== Reception ==
Claire Holden Rothman, in the Montreal Review of Books, said it was "an ambitious, deftly handled exploration of human beings in love." Juliet Waters, of Montreal Mirror, said, "Alice Zorn is another writer to watch these days. Her lucidly written first novel Arrhythmia is the follow-up to her promising short story collection Ruins & Relics and explores the lives of urban Montrealers struggling with various aspects of betrayal." Beverly Akerman, writing for The Winnipeg Review, called the novel "an impressively old-fashioned novel based on the ancient and captivating geometry of the triangle." Natalie Samson, in Quill & Quire, said that "the effect here is of a jumble of voices, none of which feels particularly well fleshed-out or authentic."
