= Georges Laraque =

Canadian politician and ice hockey player

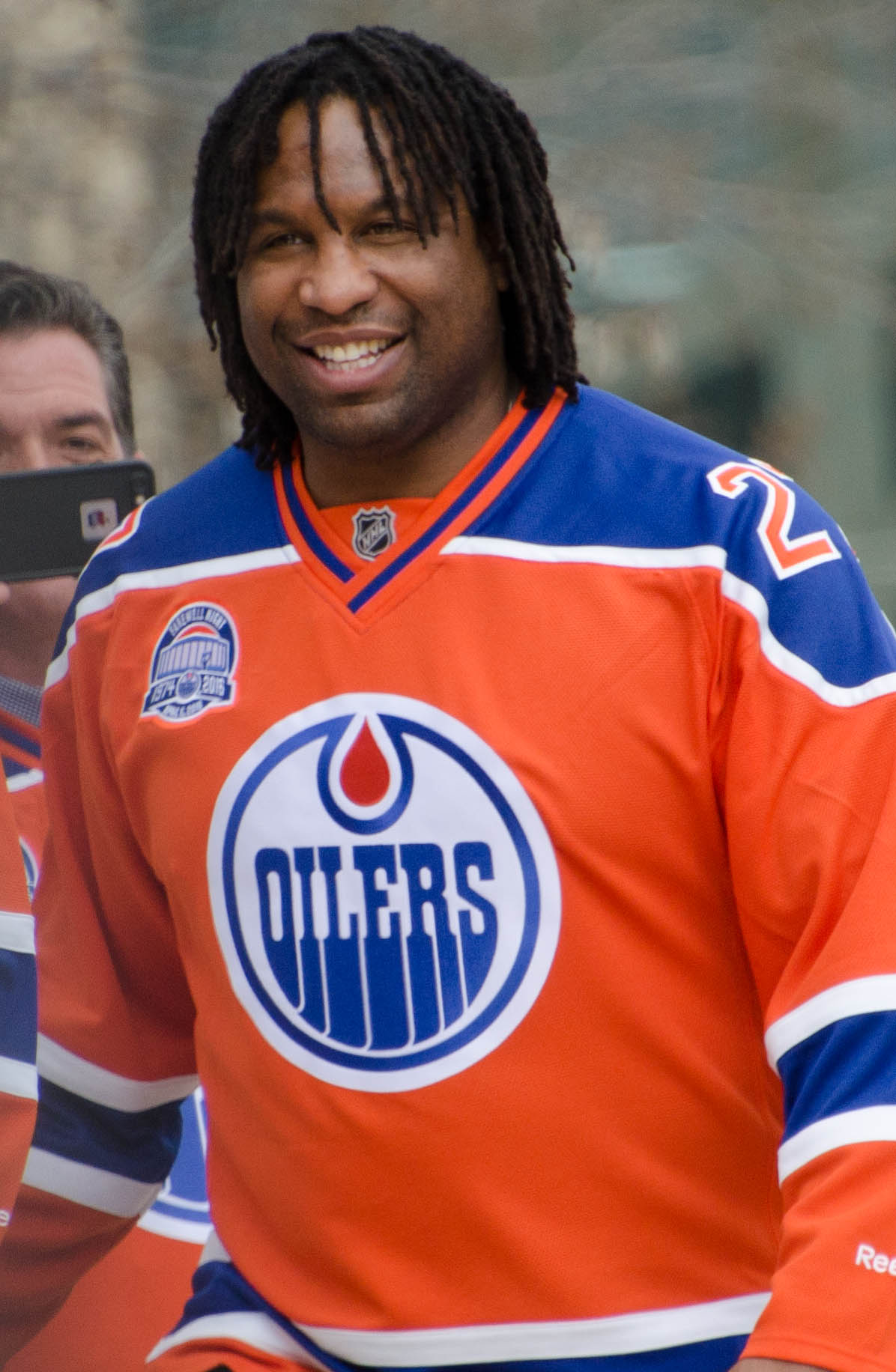
- Laraque in 2016
- Born: December 7, 1976 (age 49) Montreal, Quebec, Canada
- Height: 6 ft 3 in (191 cm)
- Weight: 273 lb (124 kg; 19 st 7 lb)
- Position: Right wing
- Shot: Right
- Played for: Edmonton Oilers; Phoenix Coyotes; Pittsburgh Penguins; Montreal Canadiens
- NHL draft: 31st overall, 1995; Edmonton Oilers
- Playing career: 1996–2010, 2015, 2026
- Website: https://georgeslaraque.com

Deputy Leader of the Green Party of Canada
- In office July 31, 2010 – October 17, 2013 Serving with Adrianne Carr
- Succeeded by: Daniel Green

Georges Laraque (French pronunciation: [ʒɔʁʒ laʁak]; born December 7, 1976) is a Haitian-Canadian politician, author, radio host, and former professional ice hockey player noted for being one the most successful hockey enforcers of his time. He was drafted 31st overall by the Edmonton Oilers of the National Hockey League (NHL) in 1995, and spent the majority of his career as an Oiler.

He currently hosts a radio show on BPM Sports 91.9 in Montreal. Laraque spends his time off the radio as a public speaker and member of the NHL diversity coalition. Since starting his hockey career, Laraque has been active in charity work spending time with those in hospital as well as playing in charity hockey games. After retirement he also aided in the development and building of a hospital in Haiti. As a speaker he is passionate in the fight against racism in addition to being an outspoken vegan.

In 2012 he was the executive director of the fledgling Canadian Hockey League Players' Association. During his 14-year NHL career, he played for the Oilers, Phoenix Coyotes, Pittsburgh Penguins, and Montreal Canadiens. From 2010 to 2013, he was one of two deputy leaders of the Green Party of Canada.

== Playing career ==
Laraque entered the Quebec Major Junior Hockey League (QMJHL), where he played for a variety of teams. In 173 games at the junior level, Laraque stockpiled 107 points and 661 penalty minutes. Laraque was a member of the 1996 Granby Prédateurs team which won the Memorial Cup.

After finishing junior, Laraque spent parts of two seasons with the American Hockey League's (AHL) Hamilton Bulldogs. On October 25, 1996, Laraque was involved in his first professional fight taking on Chris LiPuma of the Kentucky Thoroughblades.

On September 15, 1997 in a pre-season game, Laraque fought established heavyweight fighter Donald Brashear of the Vancouver Canucks in an attempt to impress the coaching staff. On November 15, 1997, Laraque was called up to the NHL and took part in his first career fight against Todd Simpson of the Calgary Flames. Laraque won the fight and would be victorious in four others before being reassigned to the AHL.

A year later, with much hard work to improve his game, Laraque showed enough at the AHL-level for Edmonton to bring him to the NHL on a regular basis. Although he was something of a power forward in junior hockey, Laraque is considered primarily as an enforcer at the NHL level. His 273-pound body and his habit of fighting made him one of the most feared forwards in the league. He was unanimously awarded the 'Best Fighter' award from The Hockey News in 2003. He was named the number one enforcer by Sports Illustrated in 2008. Despite his reputation as a fighting-only player, Laraque has had offensive bursts during his career and on February 21, 2000, Laraque scored a hat trick against the Los Angeles Kings and was also named the game's first star.

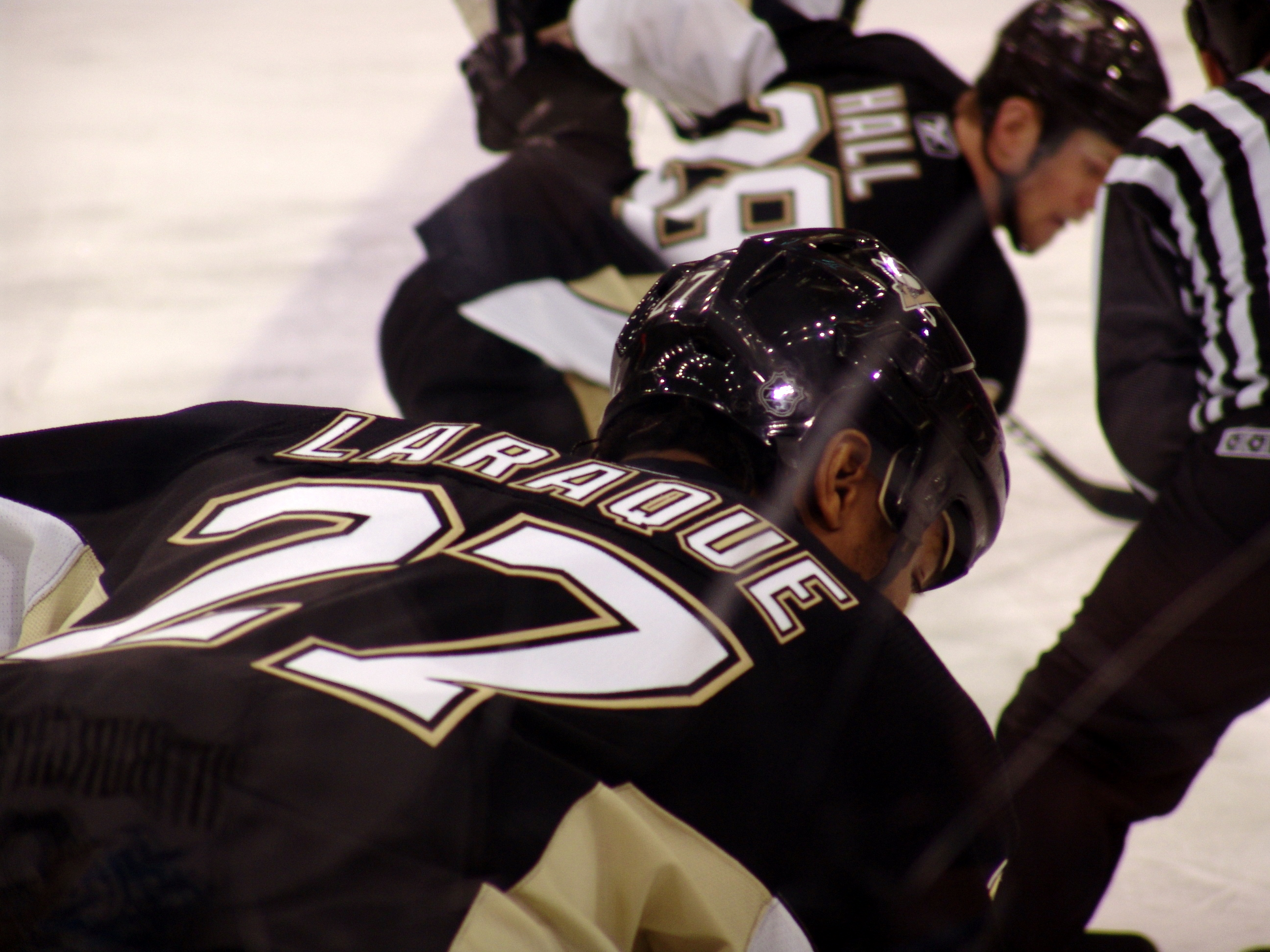
Laraque with the Penguins in April 2008

During the 2004–2005 NHL lockout, he played in Sweden, signing on with AIK. The following season with the Oilers, on November 23, 2005 in a game against the Minnesota Wild, Laraque defeated the 6'7" 260 pound Derek Boogaard. In the 2006 off-season, Laraque was up for free agency and wanted to stay in Edmonton and play. He even said he was willing to take a salary cut if the Oilers accepted on giving him a long-term, no-trade clause deal. The Oilers did not agree with Laraque's demand for a no-trade clause thus the contract was never signed. On July 5, 2006, Laraque signed with the Phoenix Coyotes. He scored his first goal as a Coyote against Edmonton on October 26, 2006. Laraque was then traded to the Pittsburgh Penguins for the 2007–08 season for agitating prospect Daniel Carcillo. Laraque's former junior coach and Penguins coach at the time Michel Therrien was heavily involved in this decision and believed that he was needed to protect the young stars in Sidney Crosby and Evgeni Malkin.

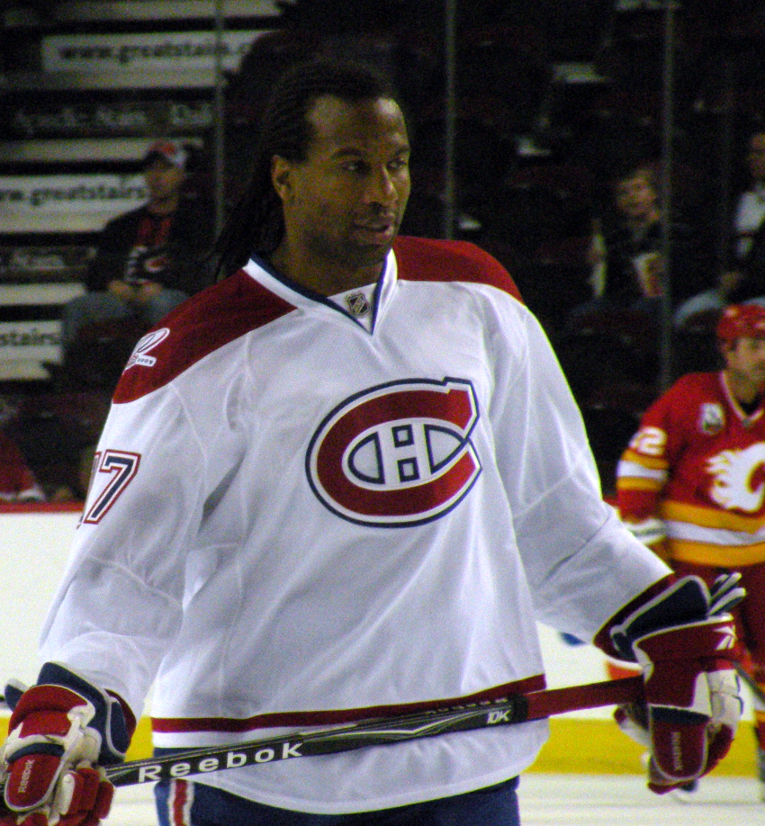
Laraque pictured during his time as a member of the Montreal Canadiens

On July 3, 2008, Laraque signed a contract as a free agent with the Montreal Canadiens. As his usual jersey number 27 was already being worn by Alex Kovalev, Laraque took up jersey number 17. One of the main reasons why Montreal sought Laraque was to add toughness; in the previous year's playoffs, they had been outplayed physically by the Philadelphia Flyers, and in the first round, they had difficulty countering Boston Bruin Milan Lucic. On November 21, 2009 Laraque was suspended 5 games after hitting Detroit Red Wings defenseman Niklas Kronwall with a knee to knee hit. On December 12, 2009, Laraque would enter his final fight taking on Eric Boulton of the Atlanta Thrashers. On January 21, 2010 the Montreal Canadiens released Laraque and announced they were planning to buy out the remainder of his contract. His contract was officially bought out on June 15, 2010. Because Laraque had been suffering from two herniated discs in his back during the last season and a half that he had been playing, he subsequently announced his retirement from professional hockey. Laraque took advantage of being released by the Canadiens to offer his help to Haiti, his country of ancestry, and began raising money to rebuild the Grace Children's Hospital in Port-au-Prince, Haiti, in association with World Vision and the National Hockey League Players' Association.

While playing with the Oilers, Laraque was famous for his "Laraque Leap", in which he would smash his body against the glass at Northlands Coliseum after the Oilers scored a goal.

Laraque came out of retirement on January 16, 2015, joining Norway's Lokomotiv Fana, where he played two games before retiring again.

Laraque came out of retirement for a second time on February 20, 2026 for one game, joining the Columbus River Dragons of the Federal Prospects Hockey League as a celebrity player for Military Appreciation Night.

Additionally, he was the assistant coach of the Haiti street and ball hockey national team during the 2015 Ball Hockey World Championship in Zug, Switzerland.

== Political career ==
On February 13, 2010, Laraque joined the Green Party of Canada. On July 31, 2010, Laraque was officially named one of the party's Deputy Leaders. On July 9, 2013, he announced he would run for the federal Green Party in the by-election in Bourassa. On October 17, 2013, Laraque resigned as deputy leader of the Green Party of Canada and as candidate in Bourassa riding.

== Personal life ==
Laraque's parents were both born in Haiti and immigrated to Canada; he was born in Montreal, Quebec. During his NHL career, he was nicknamed "Big Georges", sometimes shortened to "BGL". His brother Jules-Edy Laraque also played ice hockey in the QMJHL, while his cousin Jean-Luc Grand-Pierre played in the NHL and various European leagues. His first cousin, once removed, Dennyn Grand-Pierre, also played collegiate hockey in the second division of the ACHA. Laraque has twins who both play minor hockey in Edmonton and Seattle respectively. His daughter, Milayna, plays with the Edmonton Ice in the Alberta Female Hockey League, and his son, Marcus, plays with the Seattle Thunderbirds in the Western Hockey League.

In the off-season, Laraque resides in Edmonton, which he considers his home away from home. On Fridays during the off-season, Laraque can often be heard hosting The Team 1260, an afternoon radio sports program in Edmonton. Laraque commits considerable time to local charity work to help the people of Edmonton, Pittsburgh, and Haiti following the 2010 earthquake.

On August 10, 2018, Laraque participated in a celebrity drag competition during Montreal Pride. His lip-sync performance of Whitney Houston's "I Will Always Love You" while dressed in a wedding gown won him the competition. He donated the $1,000 prize money to local LGBTQ+ organizations. He credited drag queen Miss Butterfly for helping him prepare for the competition.

On April 30, 2020, Laraque, who is asthmatic, was hospitalized for COVID-19 at the Hôpital Charles-LeMoyne in Longueuil, Quebec.

Laraque once had a relationship with Olympic Champion Diver Annie Pelletier.

Laraque is an outspoken vegan.

== Business and sports events ==
Laraque became a vegan in 2009 to protest animal abuse by the meat industry. He is an investor in two raw vegan restaurants called Crudessence. and part-owner of the Delicieux Cafe Veg Fusion restaurant.

On May 21, 2010, Laraque squared off with world welterweight mixed martial arts (MMA) champion Georges St-Pierre for three rounds of grappling for takedowns on the TSN TV show Off The Record. Laraque did not score any takedowns. The same year, Laraque competed in Season 2 of the CBC Television show Battle of the Blades, a figure skating competition which pairs hockey players with figure skaters. He was paired with Canadian Champion and Four Continents champion, Olympic skater Anabelle Langlois. Laraque commented on the difficulty of the sport and the dedication it orders: "She was wonderful and really, really patient with me. That experience made me fall in love with this sport. Today, I still practice it and I am convinced that figure skating is much harder physically and mentally than hockey. I fought hundreds of times in the NHL and never required any stitches on my face. Well, during that show, I got my first 12-stitch gash." They performed to Seal's "Kiss from a Rose", earning 17 points from the judges but being the second pair eliminated.

In 2011, Laraque took part in the CBC's Canada Reads literary competition. He was the celebrity defender for author Angie Abdou's The Bone Cage.

Laraque appeared in the 2011 film Goon as an enforcer for the fictional Albany Patriots.

On November 8, 2011, Laraque published an autobiography entitled Georges Laraque: The Story of the NHL's Unlikeliest Tough Guy.

On July 9, 2012, Perry Boskus, president of a Florida-based company that produced synthetic ice sheets that Laraque sold in Canada, issued a press release accusing the player of fraud. One day later, Boskus retracted these allegations.

The Canadian Hockey League Players' Association named Laraque its first executive director on August 21, 2012.

On November 17, 2014, Laraque challenged Quebec women's cycling champion Lex Albrecht to a bike race up Mount Royal. Laraque required medical attention following the race, which he lost to Albrecht.

On October 15, 2016, Laraque co-founded Mentorum (www.mentorum.co), a health and fitness company, with Jason Frohlich.

On November 10, 2020, Laraque stated that a deal to fight Mike Tyson for charity was 75% done. Tyson first had a fight scheduled for November 28th 2020, against Roy Jones Jr.

Laraque hosts a broadcast spot on CKLX-FM-run BPM Sports with radio veteran Stéphane Gonzalez sponsored by Rootz Ltd brand Wildz Sports.

Laraque now owns a series of health and fitness related businesses, including Rise Kombucha and his own vegan restaurant in Montreal.

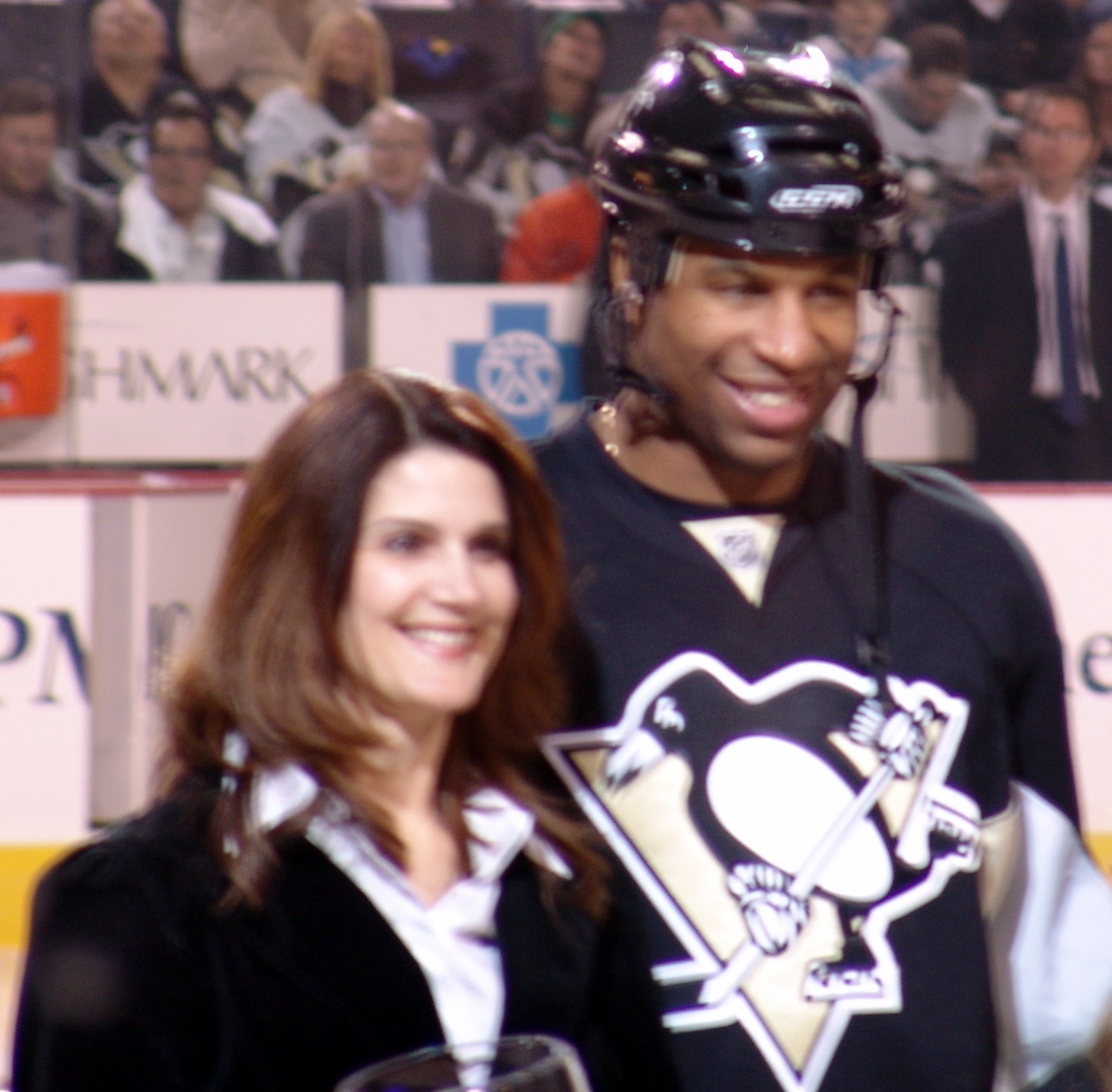
Laraque receives Community Service Award during a pregame ceremony, April 2008.

== Transactions ==
- Drafted by the Oilers on July 8, 1995 (second round, #31 pick overall).
- Signed with Phoenix as a free agent on July 5, 2006.
- Traded to Pittsburgh on February 27, 2007 for Daniel Carcillo and 2008 third-round pick (#90 overall, used on Tomáš Kundrátek).
- Signed with Montreal as a free agent on July 3, 2008.
- Retired on August 2, 2010

== Achievements ==
=== Awards ===
- Edward J. Debartolo Community Service Award – 2008

== Career statistics ==
Bold indicates led league

			Regular season					Playoffs
Season	Team	League	GP	G	A	Pts	PIM	GP	G	A	Pts	PIM
1992–93	Montreal-Bourassa Canadien	QMAAA	37	8	20	28	50	3	1	2	3	2
1992–93	Saint-Jean Lynx	QMJHL	—	—	—	—	—	1	0	0	0	0
1993–94	Saint-Jean Lynx	QMJHL	70	11	11	22	142	4	0	0	0	7
1994–95	Saint-Jean Lynx	QMJHL	62	19	22	41	259	7	1	1	2	42
1995–96	Laval Titan Collège Français	QMJHL	11	8	13	21	76	—	—	—	—	—
1995–96	Saint-Hyacinthe Lasers	QMJHL	8	3	4	7	59	—	—	—	—	—
1995–96	Granby Prédateurs	QMJHL	22	9	7	16	125	18	7	6	13	104
1996–97	Hamilton Bulldogs	AHL	73	14	20	34	179	15	1	3	4	12
1997–98	Hamilton Bulldogs	AHL	46	10	20	30	154	3	0	0	0	11
1997–98	Edmonton Oilers	NHL	11	0	0	0	59	—	—	—	—	—
1998–99	Edmonton Oilers	NHL	39	3	2	5	57	4	0	0	0	2
1998–99	Hamilton Bulldogs	AHL	25	6	8	14	93	—	—	—	—	—
1999–2000	Edmonton Oilers	NHL	76	8	8	16	123	5	0	1	1	6
2000–01	Edmonton Oilers	NHL	82	13	16	29	148	6	1	1	2	8
2001–02	Edmonton Oilers	NHL	80	5	14	19	157	—	—	—	—	—
2002–03	Edmonton Oilers	NHL	64	6	7	13	110	6	1	3	4	4
2003–04	Edmonton Oilers	NHL	66	6	11	17	99	—	—	—	—	—
2005–06	Edmonton Oilers	NHL	72	2	10	12	73	15	1	1	2	**44**
2006–07	Phoenix Coyotes	NHL	56	5	17	22	52	—	—	—	—	—
2006–07	Pittsburgh Penguins	NHL	17	0	2	2	18	2	0	0	0	0
2007–08	Pittsburgh Penguins	NHL	71	4	9	13	141	15	1	2	3	4
2008–09	Montreal Canadiens	NHL	33	0	2	2	61	4	0	0	0	4
2009–10	Montreal Canadiens	NHL	28	1	2	3	28	—	—	—	—	—
2014–15	Fana IHK	NOR.3	2	4	3	7	10	—	—	—	—	—
2025-26	Columbus River Dragons	FPHL	1	0	0	0	0	—	—	—	—	—
NHL totals			695	53	100	153	1126	57	4	8	12	72

== See also ==
- List of Montreal athletes
- List of famous Montrealers
- List of black NHL players
- List of Pittsburgh Penguins players
