= Arrhythmia (disambiguation) =

Arrhythmia is a group of conditions in which the heartbeat is irregular, too fast, or too slow.

Arrhythmia may also refer to:

- Arrhythmia (film), a 2017 Russian drama film
- Arrhythmia (Antipop Consortium album), 2002
- Arrhythmia (Hail the Ghost album), 2019
- Arrhythmia (novel), a 2011 novel by Alice Zorn
