= Heidi Jacobs =

Heidi Jacobs may refer to:

- Heidi Hayes Jacobs (born 1948), author and education leader
- Heidi L. M. Jacobs, Canadian writer
