= Cassie Stocks =

Canadian writer

Cassie Stocks (born 1966) is a Canadian writer, who won the Stephen Leacock Memorial Medal for Humour in 2013 for her debut novel, Dance, Gladys, Dance.

Born in Edmonton, Alberta, 1966, Stocks is currently based in Eston, Saskatchewan. In addition to her writing, she worked at the town's Co-op store. She worked at a steel plant when she was first accepted to a writing workshop at the Banff Centre in 2002, and subsequently left that job to study professional writing at Grant MacEwan University.

== Works ==
- Dance, Gladys, Dance (2012, NeWest Press. ISBN 978-1-897126-76-9.)
