= Canadian Hockey League Players' Association =

Proposed labour union

The Canadian Hockey League Players' Association (CHLPA) was a proposed labour union that tried to represent the players of the Canadian Hockey League (CHL) and its three constituent leagues: the Ontario Hockey League (OHL), Quebec Major Junior Hockey League (QMJHL) and Western Hockey League (WHL). The CHLPA's primary focus revolved around the education packages the three leagues offer players during and after their junior hockey careers. Its executive director was former National Hockey League (NHL) player Georges Laraque.

The CHL resisted the union's creation, and was faced with threats of lawsuits by the union for operating in "sweatshop" conditions. Believing the association was being evasive in requests to identify the individuals behind the union, the CHL hired private investigators. The CHLPA fell into disarray two months after its founding over questions of whether Randy Gumbley, a man twice convicted of defrauding junior hockey players, was involved. Laraque announced on November 1, 2012, that he would step down as executive director once he handed the fledgling union over to an established body.

== Formation ==
The proposed players' association first emerged in August 2012. CHLPA spokesman Derek Clarke stated the union had gone public with its intents after 14 months of planning and with representatives from all 60 of the CHL's teams. The CHLPA announced it intends to seek certification in each province that CHL teams operate as well as the United States. A story by The Junior Hockey News published on August 17, 2012 revealed the CHLPA's existence, stated the association adopted its constitution on August 9, 2012, and formed a board of governors. The association named former NHL player Georges Laraque its first executive director on August 21, 2012.

While Clarke claimed the CHLPA had widespread support from players, most stated they were not aware of the proposed association's goals, and some had never heard of it. When asked, Peterborough Petes' goaltender Andrew D'Agostini stated: "I can’t complain about the things I have gotten out of this league. The experience of playing for Team Canada. Playing in the Subway Series. You’re always decked out in nice gear and are given free stuff. I’m sure I have gone through thousands of dollars worth of hockey sticks alone. I know I have been well taken care of. I don’t know what to say."

"I had a great time and can’t say enough good things about them, but I was making $44 a week. It is a little bit unfair" he went on to say "But when people (junior team owners) are making a lot of money, there should be a union."

— Former OHL and current NHL player Taylor Hall speaks in support of the union.

Support amongst players for the union was mixed. The Sarnia Observer interviewed several Sarnia Sting players who were supportive of the effort, including captain Nathan Chiarlitti: "they raise a couple of solid points and I agree with them, I have no problem backing that up." Other teams, including the WHL's Saskatoon Blades, were less receptive.

== Proposals ==
Speaking with Rogers Sportsnet, Clarke outlined the goals the CHLPA hoped to achieve. He stated the primary focus of the association was to improve the education packages the CHL and its member leagues offer. Specifically:

- Abolish the 12–18 month time limit a player has to utilize the current scholarship packages offered by the three leagues, making them available for up to four years
- Allow players to utilize the education package for non-university schools, including trade schools
- Apply a $1.50 ticket surcharge to all tickets sold that would fund an expanded education program
- Establish a program that would fund entrepreneurial opportunities for former players
- Grant players personality rights revenue from CHL and Hockey Canada events

== CHL response ==
CHL president David Branch countered the CHLPA's claims in an August 22 press release, arguing that his organization's programs are sufficient and challenged the association's certification plans. In his statement, he claimed: "our league is comprised of 60 teams, all of which operate as individual corporate entities. Given this structure, any organization drive would be required to be at an individual team level." Additionally, Branch claimed that his organization had not received any notification that the CHLPA intended to organize as a body to represent major junior players.

== Certification efforts ==
The CHLPA accused the WHL's Alberta teams of disrupting unionization meetings and cutting organizing players' ice time as punishment. Additionally, it sent letters to all 60 teams threatening them with lawsuits over what it described as running "sweatshops" and for the "blatant disregard for the bare minimum working standards that have been set for employees". The union then filed legal claims against the Halifax Mooseheads in Nova Scotia, promising it would be "the first of many".

The CHL, meanwhile, received complaints from players about late-night calls from union representatives from blocked numbers. Stating it was acting for the players' security, the league hired private investigators to try to identify who Derek Clarke is. The CHLPA's organization efforts were thrown into disarray at the start of November 2012 when questions surfaced as to whether Clarke is actually Randy Gumbley, a man twice convicted of defrauding junior hockey players. In a television interview, Laraque identified a photograph of Gumbley as being Derek Clarke, but denied they were the same person in a subsequent interview. The CHLPA denied that Randy Gumbley is involved with the association, but rather his brother Glenn is. The Sports Network's Dave Naylor, meanwhile, claimed he had spoken to more than one person calling themselves Derek Clarke.

The CHLPA had already received the required support from the players on the QMJHL's Sherbrooke Phoenix and had scheduled a vote with the players on the Cape Breton Screaming Eagles. However, the union's ratification efforts collapsed after the confusion over Clarke's identity was revealed. The vote in Cape Breton was cancelled after its application was withdrawn. At the same time, legal representatives for the CHLPA in Alberta and Quebec cut ties, and the player behind the action against the Halifax Mooseheads withdrew his complaint. With the CHLPA's future left in doubt, Georges Laraque announced on November 1 that he would step down as executive director once the association could be transitioned into an established organization.

Following the demise of the CHLPA effort, Canada's largest private sector union, Unifor, began to press for unionization of junior players in 2014. Though the union initially denied Gumbley was involved, the Toronto Star revealed evidence that it was not Randy Gumbley but rather Glenn Gumbley who was central to Unifor's efforts to certify the Quebec League's players. Glenn Gumbley was paying QMJHL alumni to try to convince current players to sign union cards. Also in 2014, a trio of lawsuits were filed by some former players, and seeking class action status, against the CHL and its three constituent leagues over claims of being owed back pay, vacation pay and other benefits totaling nearly $300 million. Glenn Gumbley also filed a $100,000 defamation lawsuit against the CHL, alleging that the league had issued a "'malicious' press release" that "strategically and intentionally used (Gumbley’s) name ... in an attempt to find the perfect scapegoat to demonize in order to deflect the negative press surrounding their legal matters". As of February 2015, no claims in any of the lawsuits had been proven in court.

On August 22, 2016, The London Free Press reported that the London Knights organization of the Ontario Hockey League had become aware of a CHLPA social media campaign that focused on suspected fraudulent hockey jersey and memorabilia sales by the Knights through the Canadian Hockey League's auction website. Almost six months later to the day, the Toronto Star, after a lengthy investigation, reported several other suspected fraudulent jerseys were sold to unsuspecting fans.

Looking to protect the rights of hockey players throughout Canada, Glenn Gumbley called for the resignation of Hockey Newfoundland President Jack Lee, due to numerous conflicts of interest, including; owning a private, for-profit, hockey business organization that is in direct conflict with the Presidency of Newfoundland's minor hockey association.

In March 2017, the CHLPA become a member of the World Association of Ice Hockey Players' Union.
