= Ruins & Relics =

2009 collection of short stories by Alice Zorn

- Author: Alice Zorn
- Language: English
- Genre: Short story collection
- Publisher: NeWest Press
- Publication date: March 1, 2009
- Publication place: Canada
- Media type: Print (Hardcover & Paperback)
- Pages: 213
- ISBN: 978-1-897126-38-7

Ruins & Relics is a collection of short stories by Canadian author Alice Zorn. It was published on March 1, 2009 by NeWest Press. Each of the stories feature people who harbor relics from their past. The collection received generally positive reviews from critics and was selected as a finalist for the Quebec Writers' Federation's McAuslan First Book Prize.

== Plots ==
The stories feature people's relics from their past: a postcard from Vienna, the cigarette burns that scar a boy's chest, a stolen USB pen, blue concentration camp numbers tattooed on a forearm, a man's sense of his own body as HIV overtakes him.

== Reception ==
Jim Bartley, of The Globe and Mail, said, "The writing in Alice Zorn's debut collection begins with the creative act itself. A story of fractious love spun in new directions by the challenges of a holiday in Tunisia, it blends shimmering visuals with a nuanced probing of yawning cultural divides. Even better, it never reads like a travelogue tweaked into fiction." Neil McRae of Rover Arts, said that, "There is little in any of these stories that should be ignored or discarded; details come to us as they do in life, not strictly necessary to our understanding, but in some way enriching to it. We enter these small worlds and the lives of these others as we do our own: everything noticed, even peripherally, has its effect. A tree may be passed unremarked, but still it casts a shadow." Sue Karp, of Vue Weekly, said, "Zorn's style exemplifies the philosophy of writing that shows rather than tells, and leaves the reader to deduce the motivations of the characters. In Ruins & Relics, Zorn delivers a strong showing and promises to be a Canadian writer to watch."

Ruins & Relics was a finalist for the Quebec Writers' Federation's McAuslan First Book Prize.
