= Meredith Quartermain =

Canadian poet, novelist and story writer

- Born: Meredith Yearsley; October 1, 1950 (age 76); Toronto, Ontario, Canada
- Occupations: novelist, short stories, poetry

Meredith Quartermain, née Yearsley (born October 1, 1950) is a Canadian poet, novelist and story writer who lives in Vancouver, British Columbia, Canada.

== Life ==
Quartermain was born in Toronto, Ontario and lived in a variety of locations in childhood before her family moved to Argenta, British Columbia. She graduated from high school in Argenta, and after working for several years, attended the University of British Columbia, where she met her future husband Peter Quartermain.

She obtained a bachelor of arts in English literature in 1976, a Master of Arts in English language in 1978 and a bachelor of laws in 1989 from the University of British Columbia. During these years she taught English at UBC and the British Columbia Institute of Technology, worked as a computer systems analyst and freelanced as a journalist and technical writer. This work included a contract in 1983 which led to the publication of a history of York House School, Not for Ourselves Alone.

From 1990 to 1993, she practiced law in a Vancouver litigation firm. In 1993 she became an English instructor at Capilano College. During the 1980s and early 1990s she wrote novels, poems and journals but published nothing. In 1996 her first book Terms of Sale appeared, and in 2000 she left her teaching post to write full-time and run Nomados Literary Publishers with her husband.

She won the Dorothy Livesay Poetry Prize in 2006 for her collection Vancouver Walking, and was nominated for the Ethel Wilson Fiction Prize in 2011 for Recipes from the Red Planet. In 2012, she won the Best Essay award from Canadian Literature for her critical essay "Tang's Bathtub: Innovative Work by Four Canadian Poets".

Quartermain was the 2012 writer in residence at the Vancouver Public Library. In 2014 she joined the Simon Fraser University writer's studio program as poetry mentor.

== Works ==
- Not For Ourselves Alone: 50 Years At York House School, 1932-1982 (Vancouver: York House School, 1983)
- Terms of Sale (Meow, 1996)
- Abstract Relations (Keefer Street, 1998)
- Spatial Relations (Diaeresis, 2001)
- Wanders [with Robin Blaser] (Nomados, 2002)
- A Thousand Mornings (Nomados, 2002)
- The Eye-Shift of Surface (Greenboathouse Books, 2003)
- Vancouver Walking (NeWest Press, 2005)
- Matter (BookThug, 2008)
- Nightmarker (NeWest, 2008)
- Recipes from the Red Planet (BookThug, 2011)
- Rupert's Land (NeWest Press, 2013)
- I, Bartleby (Talonbooks, 2015)

=== Anthologies ===
- Moosehead Anthology 10 (2005)
- Unfinished Business: Photographing Vancouver Streets 1955 to 1985 (West Coast Line 47, 2005)
- On Literature and Science (Four Courts Press, 2007)
- A Verse Map of Vancouver (Anvil Press, 2008)
- Rocksalt: An Anthology of Contemporary B.C. Poetry (Mother Tongue, 2008)
- Best Canadian Poetry 2008. (Tightrope Books, 2009)
- Force Field: 77 Women Poets of British Columbia (Mother Tongue, 2013)
