= Roy Kiyooka =

Canadian painter and poet (1926–1994)

- Born: Roy Kenzie Kiyooka; January 18, 1926; Moose Jaw, Saskatchewan, Canada
- Died: January 8, 1994 (aged 67); Vancouver, British Columbia, Canada
- Awards: Order of Canada; Silver Medal at the Eighth Sao Paulo Biennial

Roy Kenzie Kiyooka CM RCA (January 18, 1926 – January 8, 1994) was a Canadian painter, poet, photographer, arts teacher.

== Biography ==
A Nisei, or a second generation Japanese Canadian, Roy Kenzie Kiyooka was born in Moose Jaw, Saskatchewan and raised in Calgary, Alberta. His parents were Harry Shigekiyo Kiyooka and Mary Kiyoshi Kiyooka. Roy's grandfather on the maternal side, a samurai Ōe Masamichi, was the 17th headmaster of the Musō Jikiden Eishin-ryū school of swordsmanship. Roy Kiyooka's brother Harry Mitsuo Kiyooka also became an abstract painter, a professor of art, and sometimes a curator of his brother's work. Roy's youngest brother Frank Kiyooka became a potter.

In 1942, after the bombing of Pearl Harbor, the family moved to Opal, Alberta.

From 1946 to 1949, Kiyooka studied with at the Provincial Institute of Technology and Art. In 1955, he studied at the Instituto Allende in San Miguel de Allende. From 1957 to 1959, Kiyooka took part in the Emma Lake Artists' Workshops of the University of Saskatchewan, where he worked with famed art American critic Clement Greenberg and abstract expressionist painter Barnett Newman.

In 1956, Kiyooka began teaching at the Regina College of Art. He moved to Vancouver in 1959, and began to shift his practice away from painting and towards photography and eventually filmmaking. In 1971–1972, he taught at the Nova Scotia College of Art and Design in Halifax; he documented his trip across the country to Halifax in the work Long Beach BC to Peggy's Cove Nova Scotia, which formed part of his 1975 Transcanada Letters. From 1973 to 1991, he also taught at the Fine Arts Department of the University of British Columbia in Vancouver.

Kiyooka used the ellipse form in the Art Gallery of Ontario's Barometer No. 2 (1964). In 1965, he represented Canada at the Eighth Sao Paulo Biennial. In 1969, he created the sculpture, Abu Ben Adam's Vinyl Dream, for the Canadian pavilion at Expo '70 in Osaka, Japan. In 1975, the Vancouver Art Gallery organized a twenty-five-year retrospective of his work. That same year saw Kiyooka publish his Transcanada Letters, a book project which weaved together photography, his own letters and experimental writing to examine his experience of the nation as a second-generation Japanese-Canadian. In 1978, he was named an Officer of the Order of Canada. Kiyooka's Pear Tree Pomes, illustrated by David Bolduc (Coach House Press, 1987), was nominated for a Governor General's Literary Award.

While in Japan, he made the StoneDGloves: Alms for Soft Palms photographic series, shown at the National Gallery of Canada in Ottawa. He also made16 Cedar Laminated Sculpture series, shown alongside the Ottoman/Court Suite of silk-screen prints, at the Bau Xi Gallery in Vancouver in May 1971.

== Books ==
- Kyoto Airs. designed and printed by Takao Tanabe at Periwinkle Press, Vancouver 1964. (Inspired by a visit to Japan in 1963).
- Dorothy Livesay: The Unquiet Bed. Illustrations by Roy Kiyooka.
- Nevertheless These Eyes. Printed at the Coach House Press, Toronto 1967.
- The Fountainebleau Dream Machine: 18 Frames from A Book of Rhetorick. Coach House Press, Toronto 1977
- “Wheels, a trip thru Honshu’s Backcountry” was published by Coach House Press, Toronto 1981.
- StoneDGloves. Coach House Press, Toronto 1970. Repr.: 1983.
- transcanada letters. Talonbooks, Vancouver 1975. Repr.: 2004.
- Pear Tree Pomes 1987. Illus. by David Bolduc. Coach House Press, Toronto 1987. Nominated for the 1987 Governor General Award.

Books published posthumously include:

- Daphne Marlatt (ed.): Mothertalk: Life Stories of Mary Kiyoshi Kiyooka. NeWest Press, Edmonton 1997. Roy Kiyooka's mother, Mary Kiyoshi Kiyooka's, story from a series of interviews by Matsuki Masutani and reworked by Roy Kiyooka.
- Roy Miki (ed.): Pacific Windows: Collected Poems of Roy K. Kiyooka. Talonbooks, Burnaby, B.C. 1997.
- Smaro Kambourelli (ed.): Pacific Rim Letters. NeWest Press, Edmonton 2004.
- Roy Miki (ed.): Roy Kiyooka: The Artist & the Moose: A Fable of Forget. LINEbooks, Burnaby, B.C., 2009.

== Exhibitions ==
Roy Kiyooka: Accidental Tourist (Doris McCarthy Gallery, Scarborough, Ont), 17–22 March 2005.

Roy K. Kiyooka: 25 Years (Vancouver Art Gallery, Vancouver, BC), 21 November-16 December 1976.

== Awards ==
- 1973 Victor Martyn Lynch-Staunton Award

== Bibliography ==
- Kent Lewis: Kiyooka, Roy Kenzie. In: William H. New (editor): The Encyclopedia of Literature in Canada, University of Toronto Press, Toronto, 2002, p. 582f
- MacDonald, Colin S. (1991). A Dictionary of Canadian Artists, vol. 3 (Third ed.). Ottawa: Canadian Paperbacks Publishing. Archived from the original on December 2, 2021.
- National Film Board of Canada. B.C. Almanac(h) C-B. Vancouver: Presentation House Gallery, Reprint edition, 2015 (1970). ISBN 9780920293973 OCLC 1031772338
- John O'Brian, Naomi Sawada, Scott Watson (ed.): All Amazed: For Roy Kiyooka. Arsenal Pulp Press, Vancouver, B.C., with Belkin Gallery, 2002
- Michael Ondaatje (ed.): "The Long Poem Anthology", 1979
- Vancouver Art Gallery: Roy K. Kiyooka: 25 Years, 1975
- Woloshyn, Alexa. “Playing with the Voice and Blurring Boundaries in Hildegard Westerkamp’s “MotherVoiceTalk”.” eContact! 14.4 — TES 2011: Toronto Electroacoustic Symposium / Symposium électroacoustique de Toronto (March 2013). Montréal: CEC.
