= Alice Zorn =

Canadian writer

- Born: Hamilton, Ontario, Canada
- Website: alicezorn.blogspot.com

Alice Zorn is a Canadian author. She has published three novels, Arrhythmia (2011), Five Roses (2016), and Colours in Her Hands (2024), as well as a short story collection, Ruins & Relics (2009).

== Life and career ==
Zorn's first book Ruins & Relics, a collection of short fiction, was published in March 2009 by NeWest Press. It was later a finalist for the 2009 Quebec Writers' Federation's McAuslan First Book Prize. She has also participated in the Banff Writing Studio and the Quebec Federation Mentorship Program. NeWest Press published Arrhythmia, Zorn's first novel, in May 2011.

Zorn's second novel, Five Roses, was published by Dundurn Press in July 2016. It received positive reviews from literary critics. Five Roses was later translated into French as Le rosier de la Pointe and was a finalist for the Ontario Library Association Evergreen Award. Her third novel, Colours in Her Hands, was published by Freehand Books in September 2024. She is scheduled to publish a second short story collection with NeWest Press in 2026.

Zorn has also published short stories in various literary journals across Canada, including The Fiddlehead, The New Quarterly, Room of One's Own, and Grain. She has placed first twice in Prairie Fire magazine's Fiction Contest, in 2006 and 2011, and won the Manitoba Magazine Award for Fiction in 2013.

Originally from Hamilton, Ontario, Zorn resides in Montreal.

== Bibliography ==
- 2009: Ruins & Relics
- 2011: Arrhythmia
- 2016: Five Roses
- 2024: Colours in Her Hands
