= Angie Abdou =

Canadian writer

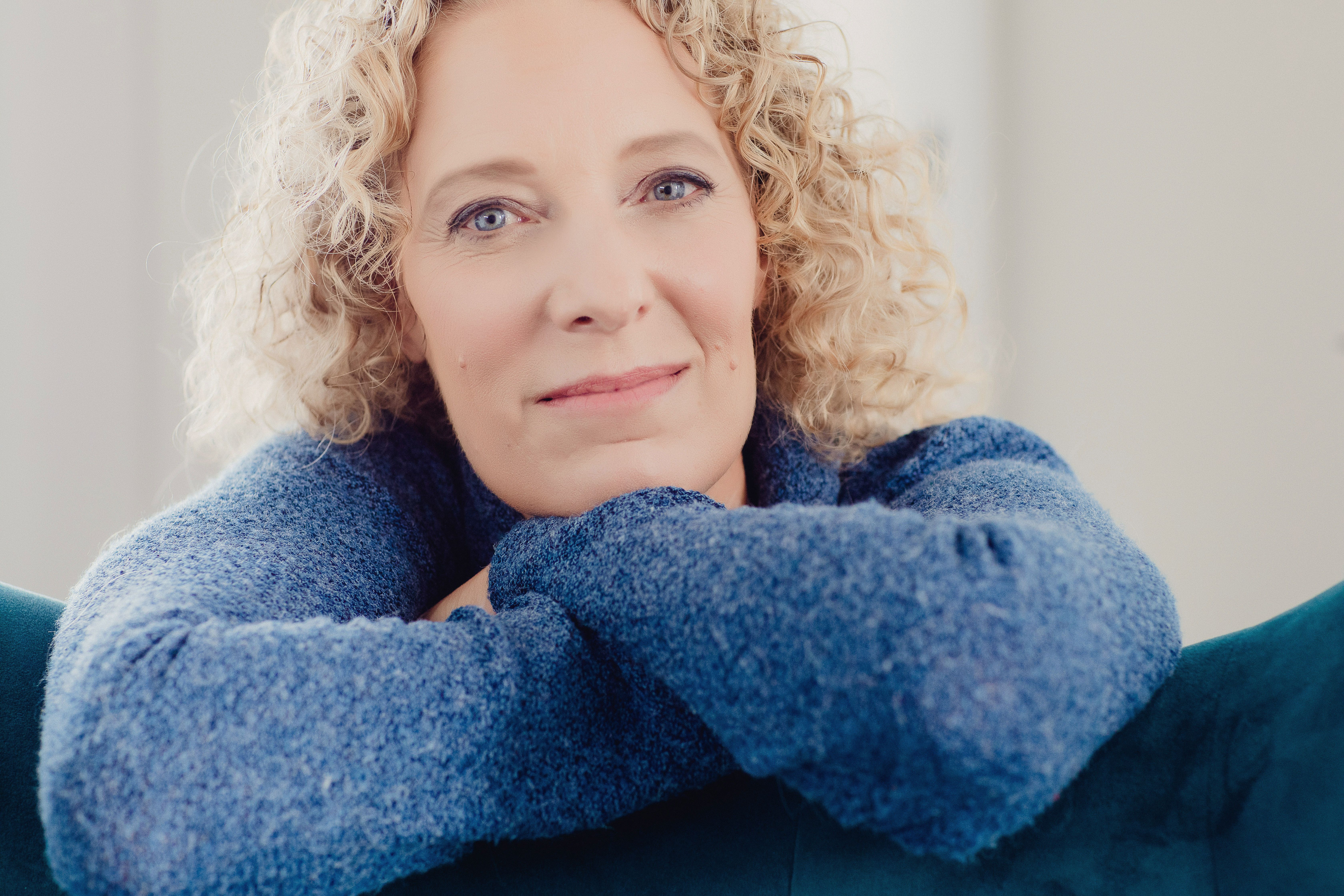
- Angie Abdou in 2024
- Born: 11 May 1969 (age 57); Moose Jaw, Saskatchewan, Canada
- Education: University of Regina (BA, 1991); University of Western Ontario (MA, 1992); University of Calgary (PhD, 2009)
- Occupation: Novelist
- Relatives: Justin Abdou (brother)
- Writing career
- Genres: Literary fiction, sport fiction, satire, creative nonfiction, memoir

Angela "Angie" Abdou (born 11 May 1969) is a Canadian writer of fiction and nonfiction.

== Early life and education ==
Abdou was born 11 May 1969, in Moose Jaw, Saskatchewan, where she spent her early childhood. Justin Abdou is her only sibling. She received a Bachelor of Arts (Honours) from the University of Regina (Saskatchewan) in 1991, a Master of Arts in English from the University of Western Ontario in 1992, and a PhD in English in the Field of Creative Writing and Canadian Literature from the University of Calgary in 2009. She currently lives in Fernie, British Columbia, Canada with her children Oliver and Katherine and is Professor of Creative Writing at Athabasca University (Canada's only open university).

== Career ==
Abdou's first collection of fiction, Anything Boys Can Do, was published in 2006 by Thistledown Press. B.C. BookWorld praised the collection as "an extraordinary literary debut." The book deals with contemporary heterosexual relationships and addresses topics such as infidelity and miscommunication between the sexes. In The Victoria Times Colonist, Brownen Welch claims that "Abdou confirms for us that the female frame is capable of holding within itself a multiplicity of complications and contradictions." Welch praises Abdou for finding a nonjudgemental language with which to discuss female sexuality.

Abdou's first novel, The Bone Cage, was published in 2007 by NeWest Press. The novel follows the lives of two Olympic athletes near the end of their careers and explores the connection between body and identity. It describes elite athletics with much detail. A review in VUE Weekly (Edmonton, Alberta) states: "Angie Abdou's debut novel, The Bone Cage, finds its heart ... daring to question what happens to athletes who put everything else on hold for a chance at the Olympics ... What lurks in the shadows of elite athletics is what makes Abdou's follow up to Anything Boys Can Do, a book of short stories, so compelling". The Bone Cage's themes, though, are also relevant outside the world of athletics. In Canadian Literature a reviewer writes: "The Bone Cage extends past sport, exploring the tentative relationship between people and their bodies. Are we simply prisoners of our own "bone cage," predestined by our body, or can we overcome the limits of our body? Do we even want to overcome our body, or is it simply inseparable from ourselves? The Bone Cage's questioning of an inherent self-body dichotomy reaches out universally, involving not only sport, but also illness and death. Ultimately, because Abdou does not offer concrete answers for these questions, she shows that though the specific relationship between body and self is individualized, our struggle to reconcile them is universal." The Bone Cage was a finalist for CBC's 2011 Canada Reads and was defended by ex-NHL player Georges Laraque. Shortly after the 2011 Canada Reads debates, The Bone Cage was selected as The MacEwan Book of the Year for the 2011–2012 academic year. Past recipients of this honour include Margaret Atwood, Yann Martel, Annabel Lyon, Thomas Wharton, and David Adams Richards.

The Bone Cage was also selected by Kootenay Library Foundation as the feature book for its first annual "One Book, One Kootenay" celebration (launched 8 September 2009).

Abdou's second novel, The Canterbury Trail, originated as a dissertation project at The University of Calgary. It was released in February 2011 by Brindle and Glass Press (Victoria, BC). It was a finalist for the 2011 Banff Mountain Book Festival Book of the Year Award in the Literature category. The Canterbury Trail also won a 2012 IPPY (Independent Publishing Award, Gold Medal for Canada West).

Abdou's third novel is Between. Published by Arsenal Pulp Press in August 2014, it explores the lives of two women: Ligaya (a nanny from the Philippines) and Vero (an overextended working mother in North America). The Library Journal selected as a Top Indie pick for Spring 2015. It was named a best of 2014 book by Vancouver Sun, PRISM Magazine, and 49th Shelf.

Abdou's fifth book of fiction (In Case I Go, Arsenal Pulp Press) was published in the fall of 2017. Andrew Pyper, author of The Only Child and The Demononlogist, says: "The past reaches up from the soil of In Case I Go to grab hold of its characters and readers alike, refusing to let go. Angie Abdou has written a grown-up work of fantasy, transporting as it is grounded and real." It was a finalist for the Banff Mountain Book award in the fiction and poetry category. Chatelaine magazine named it one of 2017's most riveting mysteries.

Home Ice: Reflections of a Reluctant Hockey Mom is Angie's first nonfiction book. It hit the Canadian bestseller list the week of its release.

In a starred review, Booklist claims: "The author brings a novelist's eye to the story, telling it in first-person present tense; with its sharp characterizations and dialogue in place of autobiographical exposition, the book is a first-rate memoir and a fine example of narrative nonfiction. It's also a must-read for parents with youngsters who play organized sports." In The Nordic Sports Forum, Swedish scholar Tobias Stark calls Home Ice "one of the most memorable hockey books ever written."

Abdou teaches courses in creative writing at College of the Rockies, Sage Hill Teen Writing Experience, Write in the Kootenays and The Fernie Writers' Conference. She is also an active member of the Sport Literature Association.

== Awards ==
- In 2024, Indigiqueerness won the Alberta Book Design award.
- In 2023, The Sport Literature Association awarded Angie Abdou a Lifetime Achievement Award for her contributions in the field of Sport Literature. She is the first woman, first Canadian, and the youngest scholar to receive this honour.
- In 2010, Canadian Literature listed The Bone Cage in its Top Ten Sport-in-Can-Lit highlights. CBC's Book Club voted it the number 1 sport book in July 2010.
- The Bone Cage was a finalist in CBC's Canada Reads, 2011.
- The Canterbury Trail was a finalist for the Banff Mountain Book Award in 2011 and won an IPPY for Independent Publishing.
- Between was selected by The Library Journal as a Top Indie pick for Spring 2015.
- Between was also named a best of 2014 book by Vancouver Sun, PRISM Magazine, and 49th Shelf.
- In Case I Go was a finalist for the Banff Mountain Book Award in the Fiction & Poetry Category, 2018.

== Bibliography ==
- Anything Boys Can Do (short stories). Thistledown Press. 2006. ISBN 1-89723-512-7.
- The Bone Cage (novel), 2007, NeWest Press ISBN 978-1-89712-617-2
- The Canterbury Trail (novel), 2011, Brindle and Glass Press ISBN 978-1-89714-250-9
- Between (novel), 2014, Arsenal Pulp Press ISBN 978-1-89714-250-9
- In Case I Go (novel), 2017, Arsenal Pulp Press ISBN 978-1-55152-703-1
- Writing the Body in Motion: A Critical Anthology on Canadian Sport Literature (Edited with Jamie Dopp), 2018, Athabasca University Press ISBN 978-1-77199-228-2
- Home Ice: Reflections of a Reluctant Hockey Mom (memoir), 2018, ECW Press ISBN 978-1-77041-445-7
- This One Wild Life: A Mother-Daughter Wilderness Memoir (memoir), 2021, ECW Press ISBN 978-1-77041-600-0
- Indigiqueerness: Joshua Whitehead in Conversation with Angie Abdou, 2023, Athabasca University Press ISBN 978-1-77199-391-3
- Not Hockey: Critical Essays On Canada's Other Sport Literature (Edited with Jamie Dopp), 2023, Athabasca University Press ISBN 978-1-77199-377-7
