= Sport Literature Association =

International organisation at East Tennessee State University

The Sport Literature Association (SLA), headquartered at East Tennessee State University, is an international organization devoted to the study of sport in literature and culture. With a membership numbering several hundred scholars, students, and readers from around the world, SLA sponsors an annual conference in a different North American location each summer. Its 28th such conference was held at the University of Maine, Orono, June 22–25, 2011. SLA is an affiliate of the American Literature Association, and the publications of SLA members are indexed by the Modern Language Association, American Humanities Index, Gale (publisher), and EBSCO Publishing. The president of the organization for 2011-12 is Dennis Gildea of Springfield College (Massachusetts).

== History ==
SLA was organized in 1983 at San Diego State University, by Lyle Olsen, a physical education professor and former minor league baseball player and college baseball coach; Alfred F. Boe, an English and comparative literature professor; and a number of their colleagues. The stated purpose of the organization was “to encourage, stimulate, and foster the alliance of sport with the humanities”

The organization’s first president was Ralph M. Grawunder, another physical education professor at SDSU. Other individuals crucially involved in the early development of the organization were Richard W. Wells, Virginia L. Evans, and Susan Bandy of San Diego State University; Thomas F. Scanlon of University of California, Riverside; Eric Solomon of San Francisco State University; Michael Oriard of Oregon State University; Elizabeth S. Bressan of the University of Oregon; Richard Keller of Emporia State University; Mary McElroy of Kansas State University; Richard Doxtator of the University of Wisconsin, Stevens Point; Robert J. Higgs and Donald Johnson of East Tennessee State University; David Vanderwerken of Texas Christian University; Richard C. Crepeau of the University of Central Florida; and Christian L. Messenger of University of Illinois at Chicago Circle.

== Annual Conference ==
The SLA’s first annual conference met at the University of California, San Diego, in La Jolla, July 26–28, 1984. The program chair was Susan Bandy. In addition to 15 sessions of papers and panels, that conference featured special lectures in honor of three individuals who are leading figures in the area of sports literature: Mark Harris, author of Bang the Drum Slowly and other highly acclaimed baseball novels; Eleanor Metheny, influential physical educator and author who championed women’s equality in sports; and Robert J. Higgs, author of Laurel & Thorn: The Athlete in American Literature, one of the pioneering studies in sport literature, and co-editor of The Sporting Spirit, a popular sports literature anthology. Higgs, who would become one of the most prominent and influential members of SLA, was further honored by the organization with a publication of a festschrift, One for the Higger: Jack Higgs, A Man for All Seasons, in 1994; and he was presented the organization’s Lifetime Achievement Award in 2008.

== Journal ==
The inaugural issue of the organization’s journal, Arete: The Journal of Sport Literature, with Lyle Olsen as founding editor and Alfred Boe as associate editor, was the Fall 1983 number (published in 1984). Section editors of that first issue included: Boe (fiction), Scanlon (ancient sport literature), Bandy (journal survey), Bruce Weigl of Old Dominion University (poetry), Fred S. Moramarco of San Diego State University (book reviews), Tim Wulfemeyer of the University of Hawaii at Manoa (sports journalism), Walter Harrison of Colorado College (cinema), Laurel Dean of University of California, San Diego (student contributions), and James C. Hinkle of San Diego State University (copy editor). The editorial board consisted of Boe, Dean, Grawunder, Hinkle, Moramarco, and Oriard. Robert Hamblin of Southeast Missouri State University became poetry editor with the second issue of the journal in Spring 1984 and continued in that capacity until 2005.

The journal’s name was changed to Aethlon: The Journal of Sport Literature in 1988, and the following year the publication offices for the journal moved to East Tennessee State University when Olsen joined the faculty there, where he continued to provide leadership for SLA and Aethlon until his death in 2000. Don Johnson, professor of English at East Tennessee State University, served as the general editor of Aethlon from 1988 until 2005; Joyce Duncan, an instructor at ETSU, is the current editor, having assumed the position with the Fall 2005 issue. Duncan has also served as managing editor of SLA since 1993.

== Website ==
The SLA website was established by Tim Morris, professor of English at the University of Texas at Arlington. The website hosts a moderated email discussion list; posts book reviews, information on the annual conferences, and calls for papers for Aethlon: The Journal of Sport Literature; and archives “Sport and Society” columns by Richard C. Crepeau, a longtime SLA member, professor of history at the University of Central Florida, and one of the leading commentators on the role of sports in American society. The SLA's e-mail discussion list, ARETE, is moderated by Frank Fury of Monmouth University.

== Past Presidents of SLA ==
2025 - Adam L. Winkel, High Point University; 2024 - Matt Tettleton, University of Texas at Arlington; 2023 - Adrian Markle, Falmouth University; 2022 - Angie Abdou, Athabasca University; 2021 - Kasey Symons, Swinburne University of Technology; 2020 - Bruce Pratt, University of Maine; 2019 - Fred Mason, University of New Brunswick; 2018 - Angie Abdou, Athabasca University; 2017 - Dick McGehee, University of Texas at Austin; 2016 - Cory Willard, University of Nebraska; 2015 – Kyle Belanger, Springfield College; 2014 – Jamie Dopp, University of Victoria; 2013 – Jeremy Larance, West Liberty University; 2012 – Duncan Jamieson, Ashland University; 2011 – Julian Meldon D'Arcy, University of Iceland; 2010 – Mark Noe, Pennsylvania College of Technology; 2009 – Michelle Sanders, Abilene Christian University; 2008 – Craig Riordan, Humboldt State University; 2007 – John Slack, Florida Memorial University; 2006 – Michele Schiavone, Marshall University; 2005 – Dale Ritterbusch, University of Wisconsin, Whitewater; 2004 – Duncan Jamieson, Ashland University; 2003 – Judy Hakola, University of Maine; 2002 – Dick Stull, Humboldt State University; 2001 – Gregg Neikirk, Westfield State College; 2000 – Sidney Vance, University of Montevallo; 1999 – Tim Morris, University of Texas at Arlington; 1998 – Don Morrow, University of Western Ontario; 1997 – Judy Hakola, University of Maine; 1996 – Steve Mosher, Ithaca College; 1995 – David Vanderwerken, Texas Christian University; 1994 – Bill Plott, The Birmingham News; 1993 – Gailmarie Pahmeier-Henry, University of Nevada; 1992 – John Pyros, Tarpon Springs, Florida; 1991 – Judy Hakola, University of Maine; 1990 – Harry Opperman, Texas Christian University; 1989 – Ed Sims, Springfield College; 1988 – Richard Keller, Emporia State University; 1985-87 – David Vanderwerken, Texas Christian University; 1984 – Ralph Grawunder, San Diego State University
