= Synthetic ice =

Solid polymer material

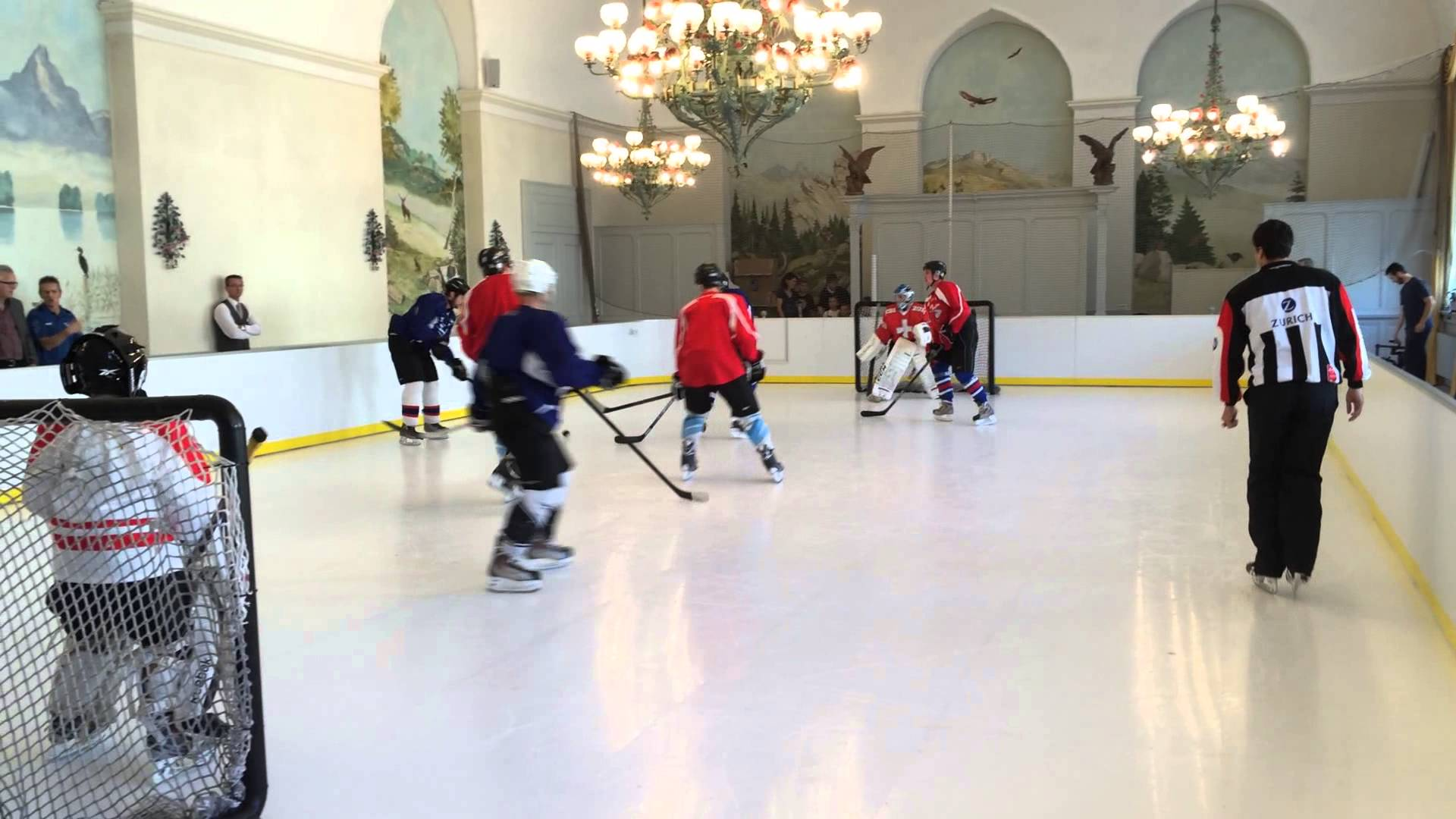
Ice hockey team training on synthetic ice

Synthetic ice is a solid polymer material designed for skating using normal metal-bladed ice skates. Rinks are constructed by interlocking panels. Synthetic ice is sometimes called artificial ice, but that term is ambiguous, as it is also used to mean the mechanically frozen skating surface created by freezing water with refrigeration equipment.

== History ==
The first known application of plastics as a substitute for ice for the purpose of ice skating was in the 1960s using materials such as polyoxymethylene plastic, which was developed by DuPont in the early 1950s. The polymers used at the time had some significant shortcomings, the most obvious being that skaters could not glide on these surfaces as they can on real ice without the regular application of a silicone compound. The compound would build up on the surface, collecting dirt and grime.

In 1982, High Density Plastics launched the first full-size synthetic skating floor under the trade name of Hi Den Ice. The surface was made of interlocking panels of high-density polyethylene which became an ice rink when sprayed with a gliding fluid. The surface needed to be cleaned off and resprayed once a month. In a dry form, the panels were also usable for other indoor sports.

Research and development in the field of synthetic ice has improved its skating characteristics. Special polymer materials have been specifically engineered for skating and unique lubricants designed to work with the polymer and be absorbed by it so that the surface is less sticky and does not attract contaminants while providing an ice-like glide. Smoothness between panels at seams has been improved by ameliorations in production and assembly methods. It is estimated that synthetic ice has 90% of the glide factor of natural ice.

In 2019, the world's largest synthetic ice rink opened in Zócalo Square in Mexico City. It spanned 4,000 m^{2} (43,000 sq ft).

== Comparison with true ice ==
When skating on natural ice, the molecules in the microscopic top layer of the ice acts as a "quasi-fluid" that reduces drag and causes the blade to glide on top of the ice. On synthetic ice rinks, liquid surface enhancements are common among synthetic ice products to further reduce drag on the skate blade over the artificial surface. However, most synthetic ice products allow skating without liquid.

=== Materials ===
A typical synthetic ice rink will consist of many panels (usually in typical building material sheet sizes) of thin surface material assembled on top of a sturdy, level and smooth sub-floor (anything from concrete to wood or even dirt or grass) to create a large skating area. The connection systems vary. A true commercial joint connection system can be installed virtually on any type of surface whereas the typical "dovetail" joint system requires a near perfect substrate to operate safely.

The most common material used is high-density polyethylene (HDPE), but recently ultra-high-molecular-weight polyethylene (UHMW-PE) is being used by some manufacturers. This new formula has the lowest coefficient levels of friction, at only 10% to 15% greater than real ice.

However, synthetics have not been able to fully duplicate the properties of real ice so far. First, more effort is required to skate. Although this side effect can be positive for resistance training, skaters report missing out on the fun of effortless skating. Second, most synthetic ice products still wear down the blade of a skate very quickly, with 30 minutes to 120 minutes the industry average. Third, many synthetic rinks produce a large amount of shavings and abrasions – especially if the material is extruded sheet. Sinter-pressed material, on the other hand, uses a much higher molecular weight resin and has a far better abrasion resistance, and therefore the shavings are greatly reduced. Surfaces have to be cleaned less often with the sinter-pressed material than with an extruded product, and the attractiveness of the rink is increased significantly.

== Usage ==
Synthetic ice rinks are sometimes used where frozen ice surfaces are impractical due to temperatures making natural ice impossible. Synthetic ice rinks are also used as an alternative to artificial ice rinks due to the overall cost, not requiring any refrigeration equipment. For pleasure skating, rinks have been installed indoors at resorts and entertainment venues while newer installations are being made outdoors. For purposes of ice hockey, synthetic ice rinks are typically smaller, at about 50 feet (15 m) by 50 feet (15 m), and are used for specialized training, such as shooting or goalie training.

== Manufacturers ==
Synthetic ice manufacturers include European-based Glice and Xtraice, and Hauppauge, NY-based PolyGlide Ice.

=== Examples ===
- The 'Polar Rink' at the American Museum of Natural History in New York City.
- The world's largest synthetic ice rink at Zócalo in Mexico City, Mexico.
- The CCM Performance Lab in Montreal, Canada.
- The biggest synthetic ice rink in the US at Ark Encounter, Williamstown, Kentucky.
- The hockey elite training center at HC Davos in Switzerland.
- The synthetic rink at Jumeirah Vittaveli in the Maldives.
- Australia’s largest synthetic ice rink at Power Kart Raceway in Canberra.
- Moscow, Russia "circus on ice" portable rink.
- The "Winter Garden" arena in Ridgefield, Connecticut. The arena has a conventional ice rink which is closed in the summer, while a 2,600-square-foot (240 m^{2}) synthetic ice rink is used year-round for youth hockey training and public skating.
- The former indoor skating rink in Marina Bay Sands in Singapore. This 600-square metre indoor rink was created from very high Molecular Weight Polyethylene and was open to the public, but has since been replaced.
- Kego Park Iceless Skating Rink in Fukuoka, Japan.
- Mawsons Skate in Hobart, Tasmania, Australia.
- The Hockey Academy Centre RedBull in Salzburg, Austria.
- Parson's Chicken & Fish Winter Rink in Chicago, Illinois.
- The St. George Skates rink at Somers Gardens in the town of St. George's, Bermuda.
- Bayshore Shopping Centre in Ottawa, Ontario.
- Santo Stefano D’Aveto Sports Center in Genoa, Italy.
- Velocity World. Doha, Qatar.
- The World's largest synthetic ice rink in Baku, Azerbaijan.
- Artificial Skating Rink at Winter Glow 2019 on Lake of Love in Bruges, Belgium.
- Skating Village in Jekyll Island Historic District on Jekyll Island, Georgia, USA.

== See also ==
- Tribology
- Ice
