= Heidi L. M. Jacobs =

Canadian writer

Heidi L. M. Jacobs is a Canadian writer, whose debut novel Molly of the Mall: Literary Lass and Purveyor of Fine Footwear won the Stephen Leacock Memorial Medal for Humour in 2020.

Originally from Edmonton, Alberta, she is currently a librarian at the University of Windsor. Molly of the Mall is based in part on her own experience as a university student in the 1990s, centred on a character balancing her studies in literature with her job at a shoe store in a fictionalized version of the West Edmonton Mall. The novel was published by NeWest Press in 2019.
