= NeWest Press =

Canadian publisher

- Founded: 1977
- Country of origin: Canada
- Headquarters location: Edmonton, Alberta
- Fiction genres: fiction, non-fiction, poetry
- Imprints: NeWest, Nunatak
- Official website: www.newestpress.com

NeWest Press is a not-for-profit Canadian publishing company. Established in Edmonton, Alberta, in 1977, the company grew out of a literary magazine, NeWest Review, which had been launched in 1975. Early members of the collective that founded the company included writer Rudy Wiebe and University of Alberta academics Douglas Barbour, George Melnyk, and Diane Bessai.

The first title published by the company was Getting Here, an anthology of short stories by students in Barbour's and Wiebe's creative writing classes at the University of Alberta. Contributors included Aritha Van Herk, Myrna Kostash, Candas Jane Dorsey, Caterina Edwards, and Helen Rosta.

The company publishes literary fiction, non-fiction, poetry, mystery novels, and drama, with a particular but not exclusive interest in books by authors from Western Canada. NeWest Press also publishes a separate line, Nunatak, devoted to work by first-time authors. Its Writer as Critic series features non-fiction essays of literary and cultural criticism by noted Canadian writers, while its Prairie Play series is one of Canada's oldest surviving lines of drama publishing. Sharon Pollock's play Blood Relations remains one of the company's all-time bestselling titles.

The company's board of directors includes Leslie Vermeer (president), Anne Nothof (vice-president), Wendy McGrath (treasurer), Jenna Butler (secretary), Diane Bessai (honorary member), Kit Dobson, Smaro Kamboureli, Nicole Markotic, Suzette Mayr, and Michael Phair

== Writers ==
Authors who have been published by the company include:

- Angie Abdou
- George Bowering
- Di Brandt
- Sarah de Leeuw
- Myrna Dey
- Candas Jane Dorsey
- Brad Fraser
- Gayleen Froese
- Daniel Gawthrop
- Beth Goobie
- Hiromi Goto
- Glen Huser
- Heidi L. M. Jacobs
- Roy Kiyooka
- Myrna Kostash
- Robert Kroetsch
- Miriam Mandel
- Daphne Marlatt
- Suzette Mayr
- Wendy McGrath
- Ken Mitchell
- Erín Moure
- Sharon Pollock
- Meredith Quartermain
- Monty Reid
- Shane Rhodes
- Garry Ryan
- Cassie Stocks
- Aritha Van Herk
- Padma Viswanathan
- Fred Wah
- Phyllis Webb
- Thomas Wharton
- Rudy Wiebe
- Alice Zorn
