= Karen Irving =

Canadian writer

- Born: Victoria, British Columbia, Canada
- Occupation: writer

Karen Irving is a Canadian writer. Irving is the author of the Katy Klein mystery novel series.

Born in Victoria, British Columbia, Irving was educated at Dalhousie University, the University of Ottawa and Carleton University, where she received her master's degree in Social Work in 1988.

Irving is known for her Katy Klein series of mystery novels. Set in Ottawa, Ontario, it revolves around the central themes of Jewish culture and astrology. The series follows the adventures of Katy Klein, former staff psychologist turned astrologer, Jewish single mother of a militant teen vegetarian, and reluctant amateur detective.

Pluto Rising (1999), the first in the series, was nominated for the Arthur Ellis Award for Best First Novel by the Crime Writers of Canada. The film rights to the series have been optioned by a Canadian production company, and the books have been translated into Italian and Chinese.

Following Raincoast Books' 2005 decision, the Katy Klein series has been put on hold indefinitely.

Irving currently resides in Ottawa, Ontario.

== Bibliography ==
- Pluto Rising. Vancouver: Polestar, 1999. ISBN 1-896095-95-X
- Jupiter's Daughter. Vancouver: Raincoast, 2000. ISBN 1-896095-54-2
- Mars Eclipsed. Vancouver: Raincoast, 2001. ISBN 1-55192-476-5
