= Pluto Rising =

1999 novel by Karen Irving

- Cover of the 1999 Polestar Book Publishers edition
- Author: Karen Irving
- Language: English
- Publication date: 1999

Pluto Rising is a 1999 novel by Karen Irving (ISBN 1-896095-95-X). The novel is the first in a series of mystery novels about Katy Klein, a psychologist who has become a professional astrologer and is struggling financially to support her teenaged daughter. She is drawn into a world of terror by Adam, a mysterious individual who believes she can help him resolve the partly forgotten nightmares of his childhood.

It was nominated for the Arthur Ellis Award for Best First Novel by the Crime Writers of Canada. The film rights to the series have been optioned by a Canadian production company, and the books have been translated into Italian and Chinese.
