= Sandra Ridley =

Canadian poet

- Born: Saskatchewan, Canada
- Occupation: poet
- Writing career
- Period: 2000s–present
- Notable work: Silvija

Sandra Ridley is a Canadian poet.

== Life and career ==
Ridley was raised on a farm in Saskatchewan and studied at York University in Toronto. She now lives in Ottawa, where she has taught at Carleton University. She is the author of four books of poetry including Post-Apothecary (Pedlar Press, 2011), which was shortlisted for the Archibald Lampman Award and the ReLit Awards.

Ridley's book Silvija (BookThug, 2016) was shortlisted for the Griffin Poetry Prize in 2017.

In 2024, she won the Pat Lowther Award from the League of Canadian Poets for Vixen. Vixen would also win the Archibald Lampman Award and Ottawa Book Award for best fiction in its category.

== Works ==
=== Poetry ===
- Fallout (Hagios Press, 2010)
- Post-Apothecary (Pedlar Press, 2011)
- The Counting House (BookThug, 2013)
- Silvija (BookThug, 2016)
- Vixen (2023)
