= Valzhyna Mort =

Belarusian poet (born 1981)

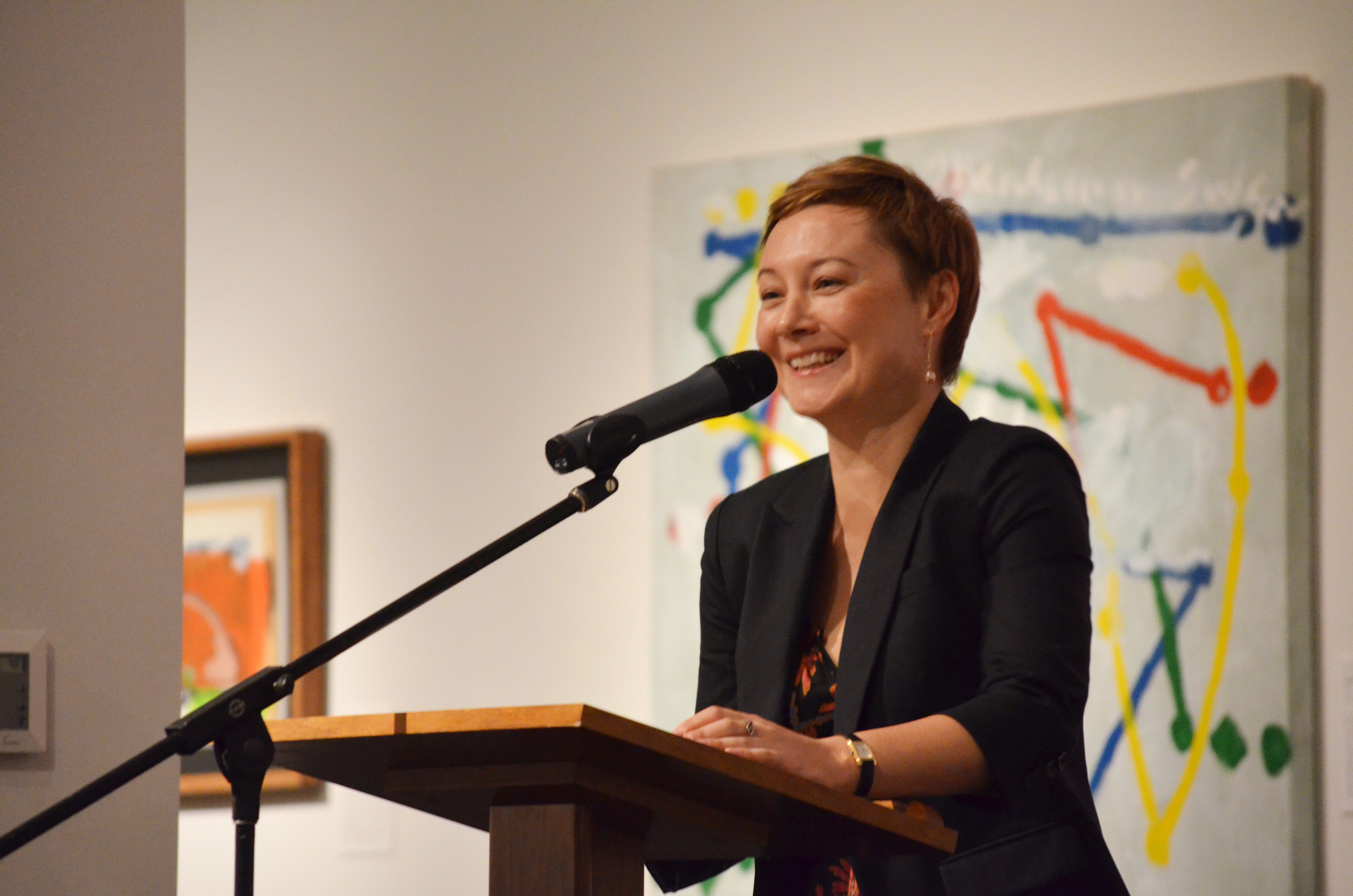
Mort speaking at the Neustadt Festival in 2015

Valzhyna Mort (Belarusian: Вальжына Морт; born Volha Martynava, Belarusian: Вольга Мартынава, 1981, Minsk, Belarus) is a Belarusian poet who now lives in the United States.

== Life ==
Her first book of poetry, I'm as Thin as Your Eyelashes, came out in Belarus in 2005. In 2004, she received a Crystal Vilencia Award for best poetry performance in Slovenia. In 2005, she was the recipient of a Gaude Polonia scholarship in Poland, and in 2006, the recipient of a writing fellowship from Literarisches Colloquium Berlin, Germany.

Her first American publication, Factory of Tears (Copper Canyon Press, 2008), the first Belarusian/English poetry published in the U.S., was co-translated from the Belarusian by Elizabeth Oehlkers Wright and Pulitzer Prize-winning poet Franz Wright. The poems juxtapose youthful coming-of-age to the struggles of a nation's emergent vitality. Collected Body (Copper Canyon Press, 2011) was her first collection of poems composed entirely in English.

Mort studied at the State University of Linguistics in Minsk. She received her Master of Fine Arts in Creative Writing from American University. Known throughout Europe for her live performances, Mort works explicitly to reestablish a clear identity for Belarus and its language. Mort is the youngest poet to be featured on the cover of Poets & Writers magazine.

In 2009, she appeared at the Poetry International Festival in Rotterdam.

In 2021 she won the Griffin Poetry Prize in the international category, for Music for the Dead and Resurrected.

== Selected works ==
=== Poetry ===
- I’m as Thin as Your Eyelashes, (2005)
- Favourites for accordion, Translator Franz Wright, 2006
- Factory of Tears (Copper Canyon Press, 2008, ISBN 978-1-55659-274-4)
- Collected Body (Copper Canyon Press, 2011, ISBN 978-1-55659-372-7)
- Music for the Dead and Resurrected (Farrar, Straus and Giroux, 2020, ISBN 978-0-37425-206-9; Bloomsbury, 2022, ISBN 978-1-52664-990-4)
- Lange Tage, lange Linien: Ein Prosagedicht (Berliner Rede zur Poesie ; Vol. 11 / 2026) ISBN 978-3-8353-6102-7

=== Anthologies ===
- Kwame Dawes; Colin Channer, eds. (2010). "Crossword". So Much Things to Say: 100 Poets from the First Ten Years of the Calabash International Literary Festival. Akashic Books. ISBN 978-1-936070-07-7.
- Ilya Kaminsky, Susan Harris (eds), The Ecco Anthology of International Poetry, HarperCollins, 2009, ISBN 978-0-06-158324-7
- Norman Minnick (ed), "Between Water and Song: New Poets for the Twenty-first Century", White Pine Press, 2010, ISBN 978-1935210078
