= Jenny Sampirisi =

Canadian author (born 1981)

- Born: Jennifer Lee Sampirisi; April 16, 1981 (age 45); Toronto
- Writing career
- Notable works: is/was, Croak

Jenny Sampirisi is a Canadian poet, novelist, editor, and university instructor, living in Toronto. She is the author of the novel is/was (Insomniac Press) and experimental poetry narrative Croak (Coach House Books).

== Biography ==
Sampirisi graduated with an MA in English Literature and Creative Writing from the University of Windsor in 2006 where she studied with poets Susan Holbrook, Di Brandt, Margaret Christakos and Marty Gervais. She collaborated with Margaret Christakos and Rachel Zolf for a polyvocal, multimedia staging of Christakos' polyvocal performance of Orphans Fan the Flames and Zolf's Masque. In 2007, she founded the visual poetry website OtherCl/utter, a place to play with language and image.

Sampirisi is the former Managing Editor of BookThug, where she also edited the Department of Narrative Studies imprint, focusing on innovative prose. She is co-founder and co-director of the Toronto New School of Writing, a series of reading and writing workshops designed and facilitated by working writers. The school has featured workshops and performances by Phil Hall, Alice Notley, Anne Waldman and Anslem Berrigan among others. Previously she was the Associate Director of the Scream Literary Festival, a festival of experimental poetry that was held in Toronto, Ontario, Canada from 1993 until 2011.

Sampirisi teaches English Literature, Creative Writing and Composition at Toronto Metropolitan University (previously Ryerson University). There, she works in the Spanning the Gaps: Access to Post-Secondary Education program, and what was previously known as the Ryerson University Now (RUN) program. These programs were developed based on the belief that education can break cycles of inter-generational poverty and social exclusion, and admit students who would not otherwise have the opportunity to attend university. In 2011 she was nominated for the Dean's Teaching Award for her work in these programs.

== Awards ==
In 2011, Sampirisi was awarded the KM Hunter Artist Award for Literature. The annual award is given to Ontario residents who have completed their training, begun to produce a body of work and are starting to make a significant mark in their field.

== Books ==
- Croak. Toronto: Coach House Books, 2011.
- is/was. Toronto: Insomniac Press, 2009.
