= Margaret Christakos =

Canadian poet (born 1962)

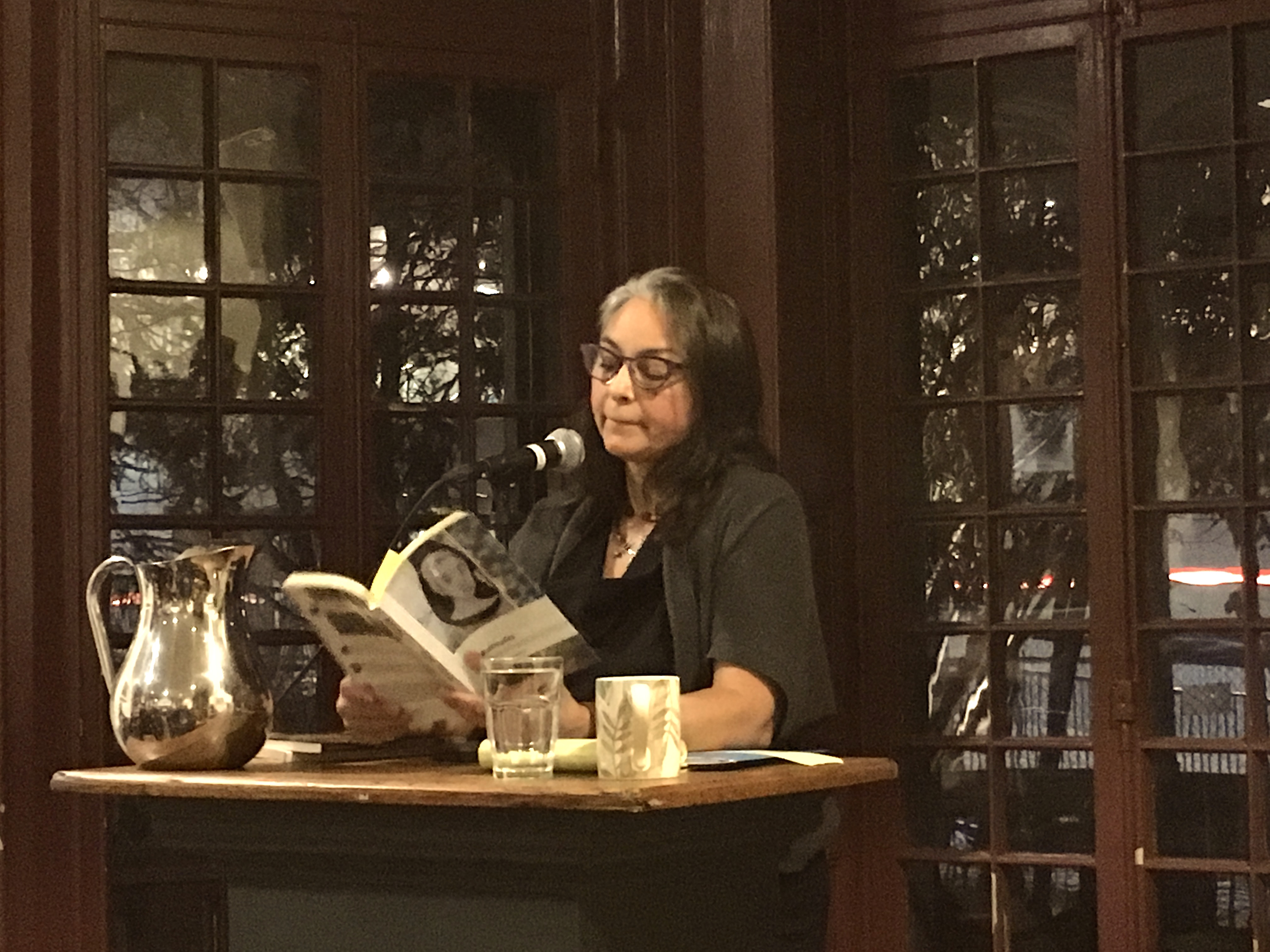
- Christakos at the Kelly Writers House in 2016
- Born: 1962 (age 63–64); Greater Sudbury, Ontario, Canada
- Education: York University (BFA); Ontario Institute for Studies in Education
- Occupation: Poet
- Website: www.margaretchristakos.com

Margaret Christakos (born 1962 in Sudbury, Ontario) is a Canadian poet who lives in Toronto.

== Life ==
Christakos was born and raised in Sudbury, Ontario. She is a Canadian poet, fiction author, literary essayist and creative writing instructor. Since 1989, she has published ten collections of poetry, a novel, an intergenre memoir including photography, numerous chapbooks and has appeared in a diverse range of literary journals and anthologies. Christakos received her B.F.A. in Visual Arts from York University in 1985. She lived in Montreal from 1985 to 1987, settling in Toronto in 1988. She went on to pursue an M.A. in Education from OISE in the History and Philosophy of Education in 1995. Christakos held a teaching position at OCAD from 1992 to 1997. From 2004 to 2005 she was the University of Windsor's Canada Council Writer in Residence. Additionally, she worked under PEN Canada in the political interests of exiled writers and has contributed to numerous poetry publications and events. She was an editor with Fireweed, with Women's Education des femmes, and with MIX: the magazine of artist-run culture. She worked for several years with Canadian high school students through the Writers In Electronic Residence (WIER) program and with adult students in the Creative Writing Certificate program at The University of Toronto School of Continuing Studies. From 2006 to 2011 she taught poetry and creative writing courses as well as designed and ran the poetry course Influency: A Toronto Poetry Salon. She was Publishing Editor of the online poetics magazine Influencysalon.ca. She is Associate Faculty with the Creative Writing MFA at University of Guelph-Humber. In 2016-2017 she was Canada Council Writer in Residence at Western University (London, Ontario). In 2017-2018 she was Writer in Residence at the University of Alberta. In the 2018-2019 academic year she is Barker Fairley Distinguished Visitor at the University of Toronto's University College.

She is bisexual.

In 2026 she was named the winner of the Writers' Trust of Canada's Latner Griffin Writers' Trust Poetry Prize for her body of work.

== Work ==
Many writers have influenced Christakos' appreciation of literature. She has mentioned Nicole Brossard, Marguerite Duras, Daphne Marlatt, Erín Moure, and Kathy Acker, among others.

Christakos writes about the fluid and intersecting lines of sexuality and identity. In addition, she explores gender and motherhood in her work. She has shown an interest in recombinant poetics as well as in autobiography's formal and social concerns.

== Selected bibliography ==
- Not Egypt (Toronto: Coach House Books, 1988)
- With all my heart i heard u speaking (Toronto: Ice Floe Press, 1991)
- Other Words for Grace (Stratford, Ontario: The Mercury Press, 1994)
- The Moment Coming (Toronto: ECW, 1998)
- Wipe Under A Love (Toronto: The Mansfield Press, 2000)
- Charisma (Toronto: Pedlar Press, 2000) (novel)
- Excessive Love Prostheses (Toronto: Coach House Books, 2002)
- Sooner (Toronto: Coach House Books, 2005)
- Retreat Diary (Toronto: BookThug, 2005)
- Adult Video (Vancouver: Nomados, 2006)
- What Stirs (Toronto: Coach House Books, 2008)
- Welling (Sudbury: Your Scrivener Press, 2010)
- Multitudes (Toronto: Coach House Books, 2013)
- Her Paraphernalia: On Motherlines, Sex/Blood/Loss & Selfies (Toronto: Book*hug Press, 2016).
- Space Between Her Lips: The Poetry of Margaret Christakos, ed. Gregory Betts ([St.Catherines, ON: Wilfrid Laurier University Press, 2017].
- charger (Vancouver: Talon Books, 2020)
- Dear Birch, (Windsor, ON: Palimpsest Press, 2021).

== See also ==
- Canadian literature
- Canadian poetry
- List of Canadian poets

== Sources ==
- "The Mansfield Press--Margaret Christakos." The Mansfield Press Website
- Gregory Betts ed.:Space Between Her Lips. The Poetry of Margaret Christakos. Wilfrid Laurier University Press, 2017
