= A Crash Course in Molotov Cocktails =

2023 book

- Author: Halyna Kruk
- Translator: Amelia M. Glaser; Yuliya Ilchuk
- Language: English
- Genre: Poetry
- Publisher: Arrowsmith Press
- Publication date: 2023
- Publication place: Ukraine
- Pages: 192
- ISBN: 979-8986340197
- OCLC: 1381030721

A Crash Course in Molotov Cocktails (Ukrainian: Прискорений курс з коктейлів Молотова) is a poetry collection by Ukrainian poet and scholar Halyna Kruk, translated into English by Amelia M. Glaser and Yuliya Ilchuk, and published by Arrowsmith Press in 2023. The English-language edition was shortlisted for the 2024 Griffin Poetry Prize.
