= Latner Griffin Writers' Trust Poetry Prize =

Canadian literary award

The Latner Griffin Writers' Trust Poetry Prize is a Canadian literary award. Presented by the Writers' Trust of Canada and the Latner Family Foundation, the award presents $60,000 annually to a Canadian poet who has published at least three collections, to honour their body of work.

Announced in April 2014, the award was presented for the first time on November 4. Its inaugural jury consisted of poets Stephanie Bolster, Lorna Crozier and Fred Wah.

In 2023, months after the unrelated Griffin Poetry Prize changed its structure to present one annual award instead of two separate awards for Canadian and international poetry, philanthropist Scott Griffin gave an endowment to the Writers' Trust to expand the prize package for the Latner, resulting in its renaming to Latner Griffin.

== Winners ==
Latner Griffin Writers' Trust Poetry Prize winners
Year	Winner	Ref.
2014	Ken Babstock	
2015	Karen Solie	
2016	Gregory Scofield	
2017	Louise Bernice Halfe	
2018	Jordan Scott	
2019	Stephen Collis	
2020	Armand Garnet Ruffo	
2021	Weyman Chan	
2022	Joseph Dandurand	
2023	Laisha Rosnau	
2024	Rita Wong	
2025	Bren Simmers	
2026	Margaret Christakos	
