= Sampirisi =

Sampirisi is a surname. Notable people with the surname include:

- Jenny Sampirisi (born 1981), Canadian poet and writer
- Mario Sampirisi (born 1992), Italian footballer
