= Aisha Sasha John =

Canadian poet, artist, and singing dancer

- Born: 16 September 1980 (age 46); Montreal, Quebec
- Occupations: poet and dancer
- Writing career
- Period: 2000s–present
- Notable works: The Shining Material; THOU; I have to live
- Website: aishasashajohn.tumblr.com

Aisha Sasha John (born 16 September 1980) is a Canadian poet, artist, and singing dancer.

== Life ==
John was born in Montreal, Canada, and studied at the University of Toronto and University of Guelph.

Her first collection of poems, The Shining Material, was published by BookThug in 2011. Her second collection, THOU, was published in 2014 and was a finalist for both the ReLit Awards and the Trillium Book Award for Poetry. Her third collection, I have to live., was published by McClelland & Stewart in 2017. It was shortlisted for that year's Griffin Poetry Prize.

In addition to her work as a poet, John choreographed, performed, and curates as part of the feminist performance collective WIVES alongside Julia Thomas and Emma-Kate Guimond. In early 2017, her performance work Let's understand what it means to be here (together) was staged by Art Metropole at Toronto's Union Station. In June 2017, John presented the aisha of oz at the Whitney Museum in New York City.

== Works ==
=== Poetry ===
- The Shining Material (BookThug, 2011)
- THOU (BookThug, 2014)
- I have to live. (McClelland & Stewart, 2017) (shortlisted for the 2018 Griffin Poetry Prize)
