= Gregory Scofield =

Canadian Métis poet, beadwork artist, dramatist and non-fiction writer

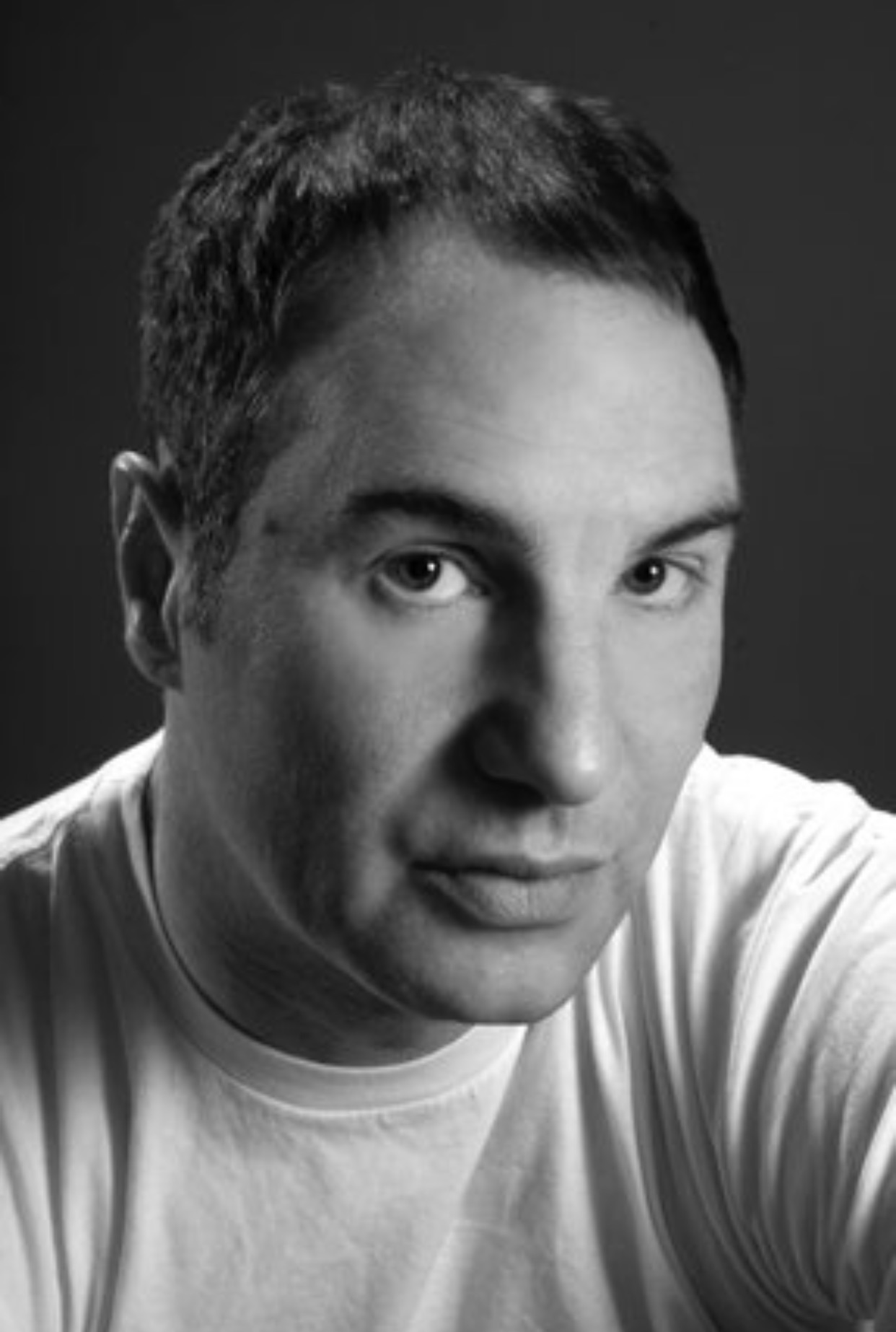
- Gregory Scofield
- Born: July 20, 1966 (age 60); Maple Ridge, British Columbia
- Occupation: poet
- Writing career
- Period: 1990s–present
- Notable works: The Gathering: Stones for the Medicine Wheel, Native Canadiana: Songs from the Urban Rez, Thunder Through My Veins

Gregory Scofield (born July 20, 1966 in Maple Ridge, British Columbia) is a Canadian Métis poet, beadwork artist, dramatist and non-fiction writer. He is a graduate of the Gabriel Dumont Institute Native Human Justice Program. His written and performance art draws on Cree story-telling traditions. He has published two instruction books on doing Métis flower-beadwork for the Gabriel Dumont Institute.

== Background and career ==
Scofield is a Red River Métis of Cree and European ancestry. He has ancestors from the North American fur trade and the Métis residents of Kinesota, Manitoba. He speaks the Cree language, and incorporates it into his poetry. He had a difficult childhood, including poverty, abuse and separation from his parents. He described his early years in his 1999 memoir, Thunder Through My Veins.

Scofield has published eight volumes of poetry and a non-fiction memoir. He has also served as writer-in-residence at Memorial University of Newfoundland and the University of Winnipeg. He has also been a social worker dealing with street youth in Vancouver, and has taught First Nations and Métis Literature at Brandon University and the Emily Carr Institute of Art and Design. Scofield is gay. He is currently an assistant professor of English literature at Laurentian University, despite being a high school dropout and not having the relevant educational background. He was the subject of a documentary film, Singing Home the Bones: A Poet Becomes Himself, in 2007.

In 1998, Scofield's aunt was killed in an unsolved crime, and this informs his recent poetry. Most days, he tweets the story of a missing or murdered indigenous woman.

== Identities ==
Scofield sees himself as a "community worker" and his various identities are reflected through his writing. He initially felt shame of his Métis ancestry because the Canadian school system denigrated Métis history and heritage, and mocked its heroes such as Louis Riel. Instead, he yearned for a pure Cree identity, conscious that his own grandfather had denied his own Cree/Métis identity due to shame. In an early poem, "Between Sides", he wrote:

"I move in-between
Careful not to shame either side"

Scofield says he learned to take pride in the Métis aspect of his identity after participating in an annual Métis cultural gathering and festival called "Back to Batoche Days".

Scofield once feared that his gay identity might destroy his Native community connections. He initially tried to compartmentalize these identities, but came to understand that embracing both together helps with his community work, especially supporting gay Native youth. He mentions that his generation "didn't have the opportunities to learn about courting and respect", and hopes that his poetry and writing can help the younger generations come to terms with their own identities. His poetry in Offerings constitutes gay Native erotica:

"I lie over him
a sacred mountain
where black bear
paws the Earth, sniffs
for songs".

== Awards ==
Scofield won the Dorothy Livesay Poetry Prize in 1994 for his debut collection, The Gathering: Stones for the Medicine Wheel. In 2013, he was among many Canadians who received the Queen Elizabeth II Diamond Jubilee Medal.

In 2016, Scofield won the Latner Writers' Trust Poetry Prize for his lifetime body of work.

== Critical response ==
In a review of Scofield's book Witness, I Am, Nicholas Bradley wrote, "Scofield is an observer, especially of tragedies, and his poems explore, with speech that verges on song, the meaning of knowing one’s place in the world. Muskrat Woman, the first section of Witness, I Am, is a long poem about a flood—in Scofield’s words, 'a retelling, a reimagining of a much longer âtayôhkêwina—Cree Sacred Story'." Bradley also wrote, "The poems concern the living and the dead—those who have survived forms of colonial brutality, and those who must be remembered. Scofield’s distressing acts of testimony, mourning, and dissent suggest convincingly the importance of the literary arts to public discourse about matters of grave consequence."

The jurors for the 2016 Latner Writers' Trust Poetry Prize were Canadian poets Jeffery Donaldson, Karen Solie and Katherena Vermette. They commented, "His forms embrace the musical, the documentary, and the experimental in a vision of risk and generosity. From raw, urban truths to the solace of Cree cadence, from the heart beat of the drum to the wax poetics of a young Louis Riel, Scofield's range of subject, work, and style dazzles. He has courage to let us in, and the patience to help us understand."

== Works ==
- The Gathering: Stones for the Medicine Wheel (1993)
- Native Canadiana: Songs from the Urban Rez (1996)
- Love Medicine and One Song (1997)
- I Knew Two Métis Women (1999)
- Thunder Through My Veins (1999) memoir
- Singing Home the Bones (2005)
- kipocihkân: Poems New & Selected (2009)
- Louis: The Heretic Poems (2011)
- Witness, I Am (2016)
