= Griffin Poetry Prize =

Canadian poetry award

- Awarded for: Canadian and International awards for poetry written in or translated into English
- Country: Canada
- Presented by: Griffin Trust For Excellence In Poetry and Scott Griffin
- First award: 2001; 25 years ago
- Website: www.griffinpoetryprize.com

The Griffin Poetry Prize is a Canadian poetry award. It was founded in 2000 by businessman and philanthropist Scott Griffin. As of 2023, the prize is worth CAD130,000, making it the world's largest international prize for a single book of poetry written in, or translated into English.

Before 2022, two separate awards went to one Canadian and one international poet who writes in the English language. In 2022, the two awards were consolidated into a single international prize of CAD130,000. Shortlisted poets are awarded CAD10,000, and a Lifetime Recognition Award comes with an award of CAD25,000.

Concurrently with the merger, the Griffin Poetry Prize also introduced a juried Canadian First Book Prize to honor the year's best debut book by a Canadian poet.

== History ==
In April 2000, Scott Griffin started the Griffin Trust to raise public awareness of the crucial role poetry plays in society's cultural life. Griffin served as its chairman, with board of trustees Margaret Atwood, Robert Hass, Michael Ondaatje, Robin Robertson, and David Young. In June 2004, Carolyn Forché joined the board. New trustees have been named over the years: in 2014, Karen Solie, Colm Tóibín, and Mark Doty; in 2016, Jo Shapcott and Marek Kazmierski; in 2018, Ian Williams; and in 2020, Sarah Howe. Margaret Atwood, Robert Hass, Michael Ondaatje, Robin Robertson, Jo Shapcott and Colm Tóibín have assumed the role of trustees emeriti.

The Trust created the Griffin Poetry Prize with the aim of helping to introduce contemporary collections of poetry to the public's imagination. Eligible collections of poetry must have been published between January 1 and December 31 of the prior year. Submissions must come from publishers only. Originally, the award was two annual prizes of CAD$40,000 each for collections of poetry published in English during the preceding year. One prize was to go to a living Canadian poet, the other to a living poet from any country, which could include Canada as well.

Among the trustees' responsibilities is to select each year's judges, who select a shortlist announced in April, National Poetry Month. The shortlisted poets then gather for an evening of public readings in May or June; the following evening, the winners are announced and all the poets feted.

In 2010, the total amount of the annual prizes was doubled from CAD$100,000 to CAD$200,000 in recognition of the prize's tenth anniversary. The increased amount of CAD$200,000 was awarded as follows: CAD$10,000 to each of seven shortlisted poets—four international and three Canadian—for their participation in the shortlist readings. The two winners, announced the next evening at the Griffin Poetry Prize Awards, were given CAD$65,000 each, for a total of CAD$75,000 that included the CAD$10,000 awarded the previous evening.

Selections from the shortlisted works are gathered annually in The Griffin Poetry Prize Anthology, typically edited by one of that year's judges. In 2019, House of Anansi Press partnered with the National Network for Equitable Library Services (NNELS) to offer the anthology in print and digital Braille editions.

The Griffin Trust has championed other initiatives. In November 2010, Scott Griffin announced Poetry In Voice/Les voix de la poésie, a bilingual recitation contest for high school students across Canada. Other projects have included funding a statue in tribute to poet Al Purdy, participation in international poetry festivals, and donations of poetry books to organizations such as the Correctional Service of Canada, the Scottish Poetry Library, a rebuilt Slave Lake Public Library (which was destroyed in a wildfire in 2011), and other libraries, schools, and colleges.

In 2022, Griffin Poetry Prize officials announced that the Canadian and international awards would be consolidated into a single award of CAD$130,000. Founder Scott Griffin said he originally believed that Canadian poets needed a separate category, but "now that a lot of Canadians have been recognized in the poetry world, we felt it was time they had to compete on the international stage with everybody else". The trust also announced a new prize: CAD$10,000 for a debut work of Canadian poetry. Critics from within Canadian poetry expressed concern about loss of opportunities "given the role the award played in securing grants and jobs". For instance, Alicia Elliot criticized the timing of the change, considering it happened "in the midst of a rather remarkable run for Black poets, Indigenous poets and poets of colour nominated for the Canadian portion" of the prize, and suggested the change implied that Canadian literature "is only relevant and worthwhile if it is being praised internationally."

In April 2023, Scott Griffin gave an endowment to the Writers' Trust of Canada to expand the prize package for what is now the Latner Griffin Writers' Trust Poetry Prize.

== Honorees and judges ==
=== 2000s ===
Griffin Poetry Prize winners, finalists, and judges, 2001-2009
Year	Category	Poet	Title	Result	Ref.
2001 (Note: The 2001 judges were Carolyn Forché, Dennis Lee, and Paul Muldoon. The guest performer at the awards ceremony was Gord Downie.)	Canada	Anne Carson	Men in the Off Hours	Winner	
2001	Canada	Robert Bringhurst	Nine Visits to the Mythworld	Finalist	
2001	Canada	Don McKay	Another Gravity	Finalist	
2001	International	Nikolai B. Popov and Heather McHugh (trans.)	Glottal Stop: 101 Poems by Paul Celan	Winner	
2001	International	Chana Bloch and Chana Kronfeld (trans.)	Open Closed Open by Yehuda Amichai	Finalist	
2001	International	Fanny Howe	Selected Poems	Finalist	
2001	International	Les Murray	Learning Human	Finalist	
2002 (Note: The 2002 judges were Dionne Brand, Robert Creeley, and Michael Hofmann. The guest host at the awards ceremony was Albert Schultz.)	Canada	Christian Bök	Eunoia	Winner	
2002	Canada	Erín Moure	Sheep's Vigil by a Fervent Person	Finalist	
2002	Canada	Karen Solie	Short Haul Engine	Finalist	
2002	International	Alice Notley	Disobedience	Winner	
2002	International	Victor Hernández Cruz	Maraca	Finalist	
2002	International	Christopher Logue	Homer: War Music	Finalist	
2002	International	Les Murray	Conscious and Verbal	Finalist	
2003 (Note: The 2003 judges were Michael Longley, Sharon Olds, and Sharon Thesen. The guest speaker at awards ceremony was Heather McHugh.)	Canada	Margaret Avison	Concrete and Wild Carrot	Winner	
2003	Canada	Dionne Brand	thirsty	Finalist	
2003	Canada	P. K. Page	Planet Earth: Poems Selected and New	Finalist	
2003	International	Paul Muldoon	Moy Sand and Gravel	Winner	
2003	International	Kathleen Jamie	Mr And Mrs Scotland are Dead: Poems 1980–1994	Finalist	
2003	International	Gerald Stern	American Sonnets: poems	Finalist	
2003	International	C. D. Wright	Steal Away: selected and new poems	Finalist	
2004 (Note: The 2004 judges were Billy Collins, Bill Manhire, and Phyllis Webb.)	Canada	Anne Simpson	Loop	Winner	
2004	Canada	Di Brandt	Now You Care	Finalist	
2004	Canada	Leslie Greentree	go-go dancing for Elvis	Finalist	
2004	International	August Kleinzahler	The Strange Hours Travelers Keep	Winner	
2004	International	Suji Kwock Kim	Notes From the Divided Country	Finalist	
2004	International	David Kirby	The Ha-Ha	Finalist	
2004	International	Louis Simpson	The Owner of the House	Finalist	
2005 (Note: The 2005 judges were Simon Armitage, Erín Moure, and Tomaž Šalamun. The guest speaker at awards ceremony was August Kleinzahler.)	Canada	Roo Borson	Short Journey Upriver Toward Oishida	Winner	
2005	Canada	George Bowering	Changing on the Fly	Finalist	
2005	Canada	Don McKay	Camber	Finalist	
2005	International	Charles Simic	Selected Poems: 1963–2003	Winner	
2005	International	Fanny Howe	On the Ground	Finalist	
2005	International	Michael Symmons Roberts	Corpus	Finalist	
2005	International	Matthew Rohrer	A Green Light	Finalist	
2006 (Note: The 2006 judges were Lavinia Greenlaw, Lisa Robertson, and Eliot Weinberger. The guest speaker at awards ceremony was Simon Armitage.)	Canada	Sylvia Legris	Nerve Squall	Winner	
2006	Canada	Phil Hall	An Oak Hunch	Finalist	
2006	Canada	Erín Moure	Little theatres	Finalist	
2006	International	Kamau Brathwaite	Born to Slow Horses	Winner	
2006	International	Michael Hofmann (trans.)	Ashes for Breakfast: Selected Poems fby Durs Grünbein	Finalist	
2006	International	Michael Palmer	Company of Moths	Finalist	
2006	International	Elizabeth Winslow (trans.)	The War Works Hard by Dunya Mikhail	Finalist	
2006	Lifetime Recognition	Robin Blaser		Winner	
2007 (Note: The 2007 judges were John Burnside, Charles Simic, and Karen Solie. The guest speaker at awards ceremony was Matthew Rohrer.)	Canada	Don McKay	Strike/Slip	Winner	
2007	Canada	Ken Babstock	Airstream Land Yacht	Finalist	
2007	Canada	Priscila Uppal	Ontological Necessities	Finalist	
2007	International	Charles Wright	Scar Tissue	Winner	
2007	International	Paul Farley	Tramp in Flames	Finalist	
2007	International	Rodney Jones	Salvation Blues	Finalist	
2007	International	Frederick Seidel	Ooga-Booga	Finalist	
2008 (Note: The 2008 judges were George Bowering, James Lasdun, and Pura López Colomé. The guest speaker at awards ceremony was Paul Farley.)	Canada	Robin Blaser	The Holy Forest: Collected Poems of Robin Blaser	Winner	
2008	Canada	Robert Majzels and Erín Moure (trans.)	Notebook of Roses and Civilization by Nicole Brossard	Finalist	
2008	Canada	David McFadden	Why Are You So Sad? Selected Poems of David W. McFadden	Finalist	
2008	International	John Ashbery	Notes from the Air: Selected Later Poems	Winner	
2008	International	Elaine Equi	Ripple Effect: New and Selected Poems	Finalist	
2008	International	Clayton Eshleman (trans.)	The Complete Poetry: A Bilingual Edition by Cesar Vallejo	Finalist	
2008	International	David Harsent	Selected Poems 1969–2005	Finalist	
2008	Lifetime Recognition	Ko Un		Winner	
2009 (Note: The 2009 judges were Saskia Hamilton, Dennis O'Driscoll, and Michael Redhill. The guest speaker at awards ceremony was James Wood.)	Canada	A. F. Moritz	The Sentinel	Winner	
2009	Canada	Kevin Connolly	Revolver	Finalist	
2009	Canada	Jeramy Dodds	Crabwise to the Hounds	Finalist	
2009	International	C.D. Wright	Rising, Falling, Hovering	Winner	
2009	International	Mick Imlah	The Lost Leader	Finalist	
2009	International	Derek Mahon	Life on Earth	Finalist	
2009	International	Dean Young	Primitive Mentor	Finalist	
2009	Lifetime Recognition	Hans Magnus Enzensberger		Winner	

=== 2010s ===
Griffin Poetry Prize winners, finalists, and judges, 2010-2019
Year	Category	Poet	Title	Result	Ref.
2010 (Note: The 2010 judges were Anne Carson, Kathleen Jamie, and Carl Phillips. The guest speaker at the awards ceremony was Glyn Maxwell.)	Canada	Karen Solie	Pigeon	Winner	
2010	Canada	Kate Hall	The Certainty Dream	Finalist	
2010	Canada	P. K. Page	Coal and Roses	Finalist	
2010	International	Eilean Ni Chuilleanain	The Sun-fish	Winner	
2010	International	John Glenday	Grain	Finalist	
2010	International	Louise Glück	A Village Life	Finalist	
2010	International	Susan Wicks (trans.)	Cold Spring in Winter by Valérie Rouzeau	Finalist	
2010	Lifetime Recognition	Adrienne Rich		Winner	
2011 (Note: The 2011 judges were Tim Lilburn, Colm Tóibín, and Chase Twichell. The guest performer at the awards ceremony was Jonathan Welstead, National Poetry In Voice recitation champion.)	Canada	Dionne Brand	Ossuaries	Winner	
2011	Canada	Suzanne Buffam	The Irrationalist	Finalist	
2011	Canada	John Steffler	Lookout	Finalist	
2011	International	Gjertrud Schnackenberg	Heavenly Questions	Winner	
2011	International	Seamus Heaney	Human Chain	Finalist	
2011	International	Khaled Mattawa (trans.)	Adonis: Selected Poems by Adunis	Finalist	
2011	International	Philip Mosley (trans.)	The Book of the Snow from the French by Francois Jacqmin	Finalist	
2011	Lifetime Recognition	Yves Bonnefoy		Winner	
2012 (Note: The 2012 judges were Heather McHugh, David O'Meara, and Fiona Sampson. The guest performer at the awards ceremony was Alexander Gagliano, National Poetry In Voice recitation champion.)	Canada	Ken Babstock	Methodist Hatchet	Winner	
2012	Canada	Phil Hall	Killdeer	Finalist	
2012	Canada	Jan Zwicky	Forge	Finalist	
2012	International	David Harsent	Night	Winner	
2012	International	Yusef Komunyakaa	The Chameleon Couch	Finalist	
2012	International	Sean O'Brien	November	Finalist	
2012	International	Joanna Trzeciak (trans.)	Sobbing Superpower: Selected Poems of Tadeusz Rózewicz	Finalist	
2012	Lifetime Recognition	Seamus Heaney		Winner	
2013 (Note: The 2013 judges were Suzanne Buffam, Mark Doty, and Wang Ping. The guest performer at the awards ceremony was Kyla Kane, National Poetry In Voice recitation champion, and the guest speaker at the awards ceremony was Pura López Colomé.)	Canada	David McFadden	What's the Score?	Winner	
2013	Canada	James Pollock	Sailing to Babylon	Finalist	
2013	Canada	Ian Williams	Personals	Finalist	
2013	International	Fady Joudah (trans.)	The Straw Bird It Follows Me, and Other Poems by Ghassan Zaqtan	Winner	
2013	International	Jennifer Maiden	Liquid Nitrogen	Finalist	
2013	International	Alan Shapiro	Night of the Republic	Finalist	
2013	International	Brenda Shaughnessy	Our Andromeda	Finalist	
2014 (Note: The 2014 judges were Robert Bringhurst, Jo Shapcott, and C.D. Wright. The guest performer at the awards ceremony was Khalil Mair, National Poetry In Voice recitation champion, and the guest speaker at the awards ceremony was August Kleinzahler.)	Canada	Anne Carson	Red Doc>	Winner	
2014	Canada	Susan Goyette	Ocean	Finalist	
2014	Canada	Anne Michaels	Correspondences	Finalist	
2014	International	Brenda Hillman	Seasonal Works with Letters on Fire	Winner	
2014	International	Rachael Boast	Pilgrim's Flower	Finalist	
2014	International	Carl Phillips	Silverchest	Finalist	
2014	International	Mira Rosenthal (trans.)	Colonies by Tomasz Różycki	Finalist	
2014	Lifetime Recognition	Adelia Prado		Winner	
2015 (Note: The 2015 judges were Tim Bowling, Fanny Howe, and Piotr Sommer. The guest performer at the awards ceremony was Ayo Akinfenwa, National Poetry In Voice recitation champion.)	Canada	Jane Munro	Blue Sonoma	Winner	
2015	Canada	Shane Book	Congotronic	Finalist	
2015	Canada	Russell Thornton	The Hundred Lives	Finalist	
2015	International	Michael Longley	The Stairwell	Winner	
2015	International	Eleanor Goodman (trans.)	Something Crosses My Mind by Wang Xiaoni	Finalist	
2015	International	Marek Kazmierski (trans.)	Finite Formulae & Theories of Chance by Wioletta Greg	Finalist	
2015	International	Spencer Reece	The Road to Emmaus	Finalist	
2015	Lifetime Recognition	Derek Walcott		Winner	
2016 (Note: The 2016 judges were Alice Oswald, Tracy K. Smith, and Adam Sol. The guest performer at the awards ceremony was Marie Foolchand, National Poetry In Voice recitation champion.)	Canada	Liz Howard	Infinite Citizen of the Shaking Tent	Winner	
2016	Canada	Per Brask and Patrick Friesen (trans.)	Frayed Opus for Strings & Wind Instruments by Ulrikka S. Gernes	Finalist	
2016	Canada	Soraya Peerbaye	Tell: poems for a girlhood	Finalist	
2016	International	Norman Dubie	The Quotations of Bone	Winner	
2016	International	Joy Harjo	Conflict Resolution for Holy Beings	Finalist	
2016	International	Don Paterson	40 Sonnets	Finalist	
2016	International	Rowan Ricardo Phillips	Heaven	Finalist	
2016	Lifetime Recognition	Adam Zagajewski		Winner	
2017 (Note: The 2017 judges were Susan Goyette, Joan Naviyuk Kane, and George Szirtes. The guest performer at the awards ceremony was David White, National Poetry In Voice recitation finalist.)	Canada	Jordan Abel	Injun	Winner	
2017	Canada	Hoa Nguyen	Violet Energy Ingots	Finalist	
2017	Canada	Sandra Ridley	Silvija	Finalist	
2017	International	Alice Oswald	Falling Awake	Winner	
2017	International	Jane Mead	World of Made and Unmade	Finalist	
2017	International	Donald Nicholson-Smith (trans.)	In Praise of Defeat by Abdellatif Laabi	Finalist	
2017	International	Denise Riley	Say Something Back	Finalist	
2017	Lifetime Recognition	Frank Bidart		Winner	
2018 (Note: The 2018 judges were Sarah Howe, Ben Lerner, and Ian Williams. The guest performer at the awards ceremony was Hamish Marissen-Clark, National Poetry In Voice recitation champion, and the guest speaker at awards ceremony was August Kleinzahler, 2004 Griffin Poetry Prize winner.)	Canada	Billy-Ray Belcourt	This Wound is a World	Winner	
2018	Canada	Aisha Sasha John	I have to live.	Finalist	
2018	Canada	Donato Mancini	Same Diff	Finalist	
2018	International	Susan Howe	Debths	Winner	
2018	International	Tongo Eisen-Martin	Heaven is All Goodbyes	Finalist	
2018	International	Layli Long Soldier	Whereas	Finalist	
2018	International	Natalie Shapero	Hard Child	Finalist	
2018	Lifetime Recognition	Ana Blandiana		Winner	
2019 (Note: The 2019 judges were Ulrikka S. Gernes, Kim Maltman, and Srikanth Reddy. The guest performer at the awards ceremony was Catricia Hiebert, National Poetry In Voice recitation champion.)	Canada	Eve Joseph	Quarrels	Winner	
2019	Canada	Dionne Brand	The Blue Clerk	Finalist	
2019	Canada	Sarah Tolmie	The Art of Dying	Finalist	
2019	International	Don Mee Choi (trans.)	Autobiography of Death by Kim Hyesoon	Winner	
2019	International	Raymond Antrobus	The Perseverance	Finalist	
2019	International	Daniel Borzutzky	Lake Michigan	Finalist	
2019	International	Ani Gjika (trans.)	Negative Space by Luljeta Lleshanaku	Finalist	
2019	Lifetime Recognition	Nicole Brossard		Winner	

=== 2020s ===
Prior to 2023, the Griffin Poetry Prize was separated into two categories with prizes specifically for Canadian poets and another for international poets with each winner receiving $65,000. However, in 2023, the Canadian-specific prize was eliminated with only one winner selected each year who wins $130,000.

==== 2020-2022 ====
Griffin Poetry Prize winners, finalists, and judges, 2020-2022
Year	Category	Poet	Title	Result	Ref.
2020 (Note: The 2020 judges were Paula Meehan, Kei Miller, and Hoa Nguyen.)	Canada	Kaie Kellough	Magnetic Equator	Winner	
2020	Canada	Chantal Gibson	How She Read	Finalist	
2020	Canada	Doyali Islam	heft	Finalist	
2020	International	Sarah Riggs (trans.)	Time by Etel Adnan	Winner	
2020	International	Abigail Chabitnoy	How to Dress a Fish	Finalist	
2020	International	Sharon Olds	Arias	Finalist	
2020	International	Natalie Scenters-Zapico	Lima :: Limón	Finalist	
2021 (Note: The 2021 judges were Ilya Kaminsky, Ales Steger, and Souvankham Thammavongsa.)	Canada	Canisia Lubrin	The Dyzgraphxst	Winner	
2021	Canada	Joseph A. Dandurand	The East Side of It All	Finalist	
2021	Canada	Yusuf Saadi	Pluviophile	Finalist	
2021	International	Valzhyna Mort	Music for the Dead and Resurrected	Winner	
2021	International	Victoria Chang	Obit	Finalist	
2021	International	Srikanth Reddy	Underworld Lit	Finalist	
2021	International	Tracy K. Smith and Changtai Bi (trans.)	My Name Will Grow Wide Like a Tree by Yi Lei	Finalist	
2022 (Note: The 2022 judges were Adam Dickinson, Valzhyna Mort, and Claudia Rankine.)	Canada	Tolu Oloruntoba	The Junta of Happenstance	Winner	
2022	Canada	David Bradford	Dream of No One But Myself	Finalist	
2022	Canada	Liz Howard	Letters in a Bruised Cosmos	Finalist	
2022	International	Douglas Kearney	Sho	Winner	
2022	International	Sharon Dolin (trans.)	Late to the House of Words by Gemma Gorga	Finalist	
2022	International	Ali Kinsella and Dzvinia Orlowsky (trans.)	Eccentric Days of Hope and Sorrow by Natalka Bilotserkivets	Finalist	
2022	International	Ed Roberson	Asked What Has Changed	Finalist	

==== 2023-present ====
===== Canadian First Book Prize =====
Canadian First Book Prize winners
Year	Poet	Title	Ref.
2023	Emily Riddle	The Big Melt	
2024	Maggie Burton	Chores	
2025	Dawn Macdonald	Northerny	
2026	Joseph Kidney	Devotional Forensics	

===== Griffin Poetry Prize =====
Griffin Poetry Prize winners, finalists, and judges, 2023–present
Year	Poet	Title	Result	Ref.
2023	Roger Reeves	Best Barbarian	Winner	
2023	Iman Mersal (translated by Robyn Creswell)	The Threshold	Finalist	
2023	Ada Limón	The Hurting Kind	Finalist	
2023	Susan Musgrave	Exculpatory Lilies	Finalist	
2023	Ocean Vuong	Time Is a Mother	Finalist	
2024	George McWhirter	Self-Portrait in the Zone of Silence	Winner	
2024	Jorie Graham	To 2040	Finalist	
2024	Ishion Hutchinson	School of Instructions	Finalist	
2024	Halyna Kruk (translated by Amelia M. Glaser and Yuliya Ilchuk)	A Crash Course in Molotov Cocktails	Finalist	
2024	Ann Lauterbach	Door	Finalist	
2025	Durs Grünbein (translated by Karen Leeder)	Psyche Running	Winner	
2025	Nicolás Guillén (translated by Aaron Coleman)	The Great Zoo	Finalist	
2025	Carl Phillips	Scattered Snows, to the North	Finalist	
2025	Tomaž Šalamun (translated by Brian Henry)	Kiss the Eyes of Peace	Finalist	
2025	Diane Seuss	Modern Poetry	Finalist	
2026	Kevin Young	Night Watch	Winner	
2026	Gbenga Adesina	Death Does Not End at the Sea	Finalist	
2026	Elvira Hernández (translated by Daniel Borzutzky and Alec Schumacher)	Bodies Found in Various Places	Finalist	
2026	Aracelis Girmay	Green of All Heads	Finalist	
2026	Ange Mlinko	Foxglovewise	Finalist	

== See also ==
- Canadian poetry
- List of poetry awards
- List of years in poetry
- List of years in literature
