= Heather McHugh =

American poet (born 1948)

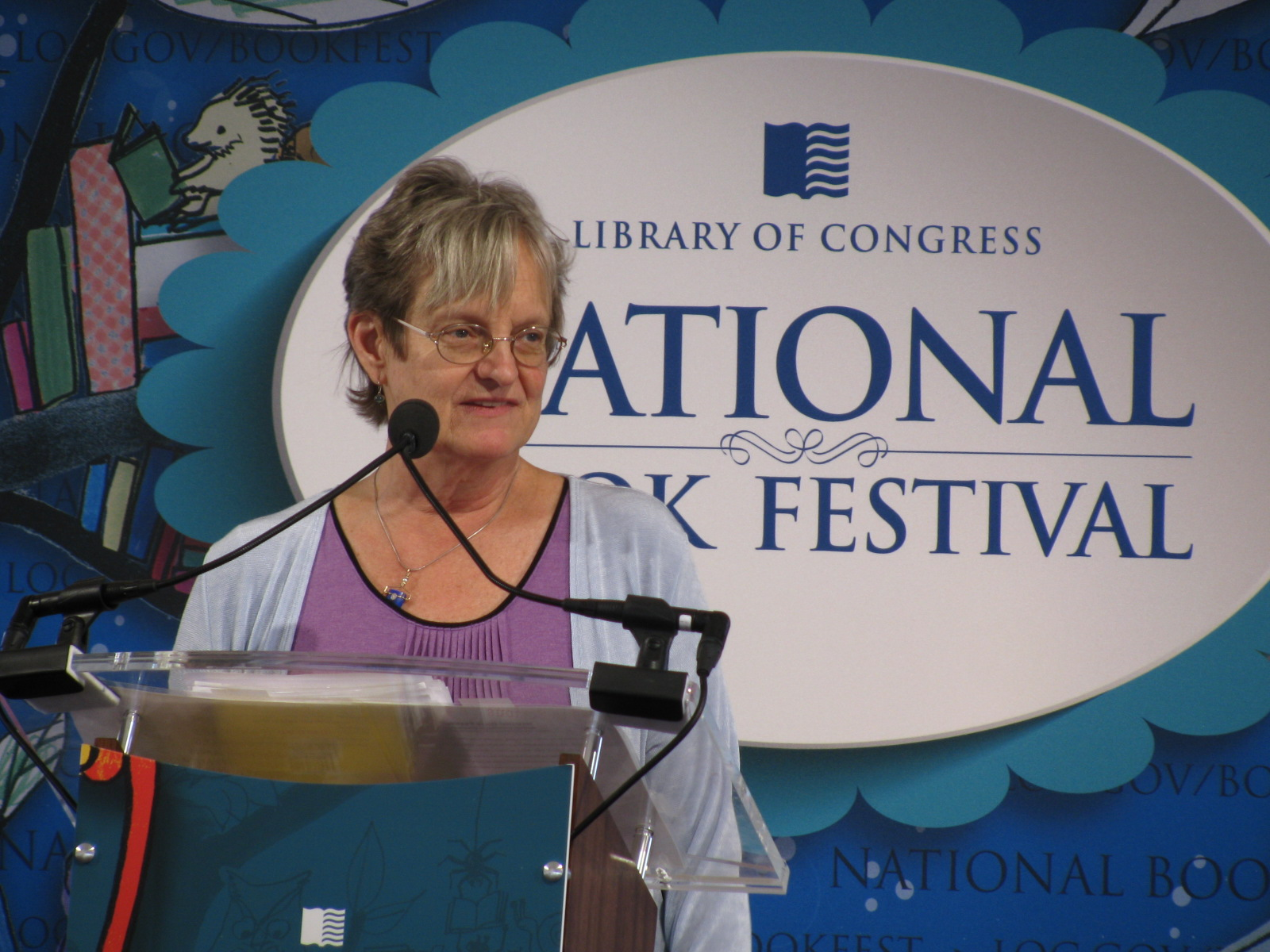
- McHugh in 2013
- Born: August 20, 1948 (age 78); San Diego, California, U.S.
- Education: Harvard University (BA); University of Denver (MA)
- Writing career
- Notable works: Dangers, To The Quick, The Father of the Predicaments, Upgraded to Serious, Muddy Matterhorn, et al.
- Notable awards: MacArthur Fellowship

Heather McHugh (born August 20, 1948) is an American poet notable for Dangers, To the Quick, Eyeshot and Muddy Matterhorn. McHugh was awarded a MacArthur Fellowship in the US and a Griffin Poetry Prize in Canada, and was elected to the American Academy of Arts and Sciences. She taught for thirty years at the University of Washington in Seattle and held visiting chairs at Berkeley, Stanford, Columbia, Syracuse, UCLA and elsewhere.

== Early life and education ==
McHugh was born in San Diego, California on August 20, 1948, to Canadian parents. Her parents raised McHugh in Gloucester Point, Virginia. There, her father directed the marine biological laboratory on the York River. She began writing poetry at age five and claims to have become an expert eavesdropper by the age of twelve.

At the age of 17, she entered Harvard University.

== Career ==
One of her most notable works, Hinge & Sign: Poems 1968–1993, won the Bingham Poetry Prize of the Boston Book Review and the Pollack-Harvard Review Prize. It was also named a Notable Book of the Year by The New York Times Book Review. Another, Glottal Stop: Poems by Paul Celan, co-authored with Nikolai B. Popov, won the Griffin International Poetry Prize.

McHugh was elected as chancellor of the Academy of American Poets in 1999. She taught for some 40 years at American colleges and universities, including the University of Washington in Seattle, and still takes some students through the low-residency Warren Wilson College MFA Program for Writers.

In 2009, she was awarded the MacArthur Foundation "Genius Grant" for her work. Then in 2011–2012, she started the nonprofit CAREGIFTED to provide respite and tribute to long-term caregivers of the severely disabled and chronically ill. For her work there, she received notice from Encore.org's Purpose Prizes.

McHugh has published eight books of poetry, one collection of critical essays, and four books of translation. She has received numerous awards and critical recognition in all of these areas, including several Pushcart Prizes, the Griffin Prize in poetry, and many others. Her poems resist contemporary identity politics. She also rejects categorization as a confessional poet, although she studied with Robert Lowell during the time when that described his work.

Her primary education included parochial school, where she credits a nun's emphasis on grammar as an early influence. When McHugh was a student at Yorktown High School in Arlington, Virginia, a teacher advised McHugh against applying to Radcliffe, making her determined to get in. She arrived in Cambridge at age 17 and graduated with honors, receiving her B.A. from Harvard in 1970. She was a Fellow at Cummington Community for the Arts in 1970, and entered graduate school at the University of Denver in 1971, having already published a poem in The New Yorker. She began teaching there, and received an Academy of American Poets prize in 1972. After earning her M.A. in 1972, McHugh received MacDowell Colony fellowships in 1973, 1974, and 1976. In 1974, she also received her first of three National Endowment for the Arts grants in poetry. McHugh was the poet-in-residence at Stephens College in Missouri between 1974 and 1976; she worked as an associate professor of English at the State University of New York at Binghamton between 1976 and 1982.

At 29, she completed a manuscript of poems titled Dangers (1976), that was a winner of Houghton Mifflin Co.'s New Poetry Series Competition, and was published by Houghton Mifflin in 1977. After a Yaddo Colony fellowship in 1980, her second book, titled A World of Difference: Poems (1981), was published by Houghton Mifflin. McHugh was 33. During this time, she was a supervisor in the low-residency writing program model MFA begun by Ellen Bryant Voigt at Goddard College in Vermont, which was moved to western NC until its lapse in 2025; a visiting professor at Columbia University in New York between 1980 and 1981; and at the University of California, Irvine in 1982. During 1987, she was the Holloway Lecturer at the University of California, Berkeley. While the top journals published her poetry, some poems were also anthologized in prestigious collections, and top critics called her observations astute and noteworthy as well as courageous.

That same year World of Difference came out, her first book of translations was published. Her poetry translation of Jean Follain's French work is titled D'après tout: Poems by Jean Follain (1981) and was published by Princeton University Press in the Lockhart Poetry in Translation series. In 1984, she became the Milliman Writer-In-Residence at the University of Washington in Seattle. The residency was initiated that same year, and McHugh filled the position until 2011 when she was appointed Pollock Professor of Creative Writing. During the 1980s, McHugh worked a great deal on translation, partly due to her alliance with her co-translator and husband at that time, who also taught at the University of Washington. Her translation work includes well-known international poets like Follain and Rilke, as well as Romanian Jewish poet of the Holocaust Paul Antschel, who wrote under the pseudonym Paul Celan. This latter translation, entitled Glottal Stop: Poems by Paul Celan, would win the Griffin International Poetry Prize. (See reference below.)

Her skill in translating literature by Slavic writers became even more evident with the publication of Because the Sea Is Black: Poems of Blaga Dimitrova (1989) featuring the work of a Bulgarian poet and novelist. Dimitrova, one of the best-loved writers in her homeland, became the first democratically elected vice-president of her country after the fall of communism. McHugh translated Dimitrova's poems for Wesleyan Poetry in Translation (published by the Wesleyan University Press) with her husband, Nikolai Popov, a scholar whom she married in 1987. Popov, an expert in Bulgarian and knowledgeable in the German and French languages, also helped to translate Celan's poetry, which was written in German.

In 1986, McHugh received a Bellagio grant from the Rockefeller Foundation. She published two more books of poetry during the 1980s: To the Quick (1987) and Shades (1988). In the late '80s, she also participated in an art project with Tom Phillips, resulting in a collectible book WHERE ARE THEY NOW?: The Class of Forty-Seven (1990). It consists of thirty images by Phillips which are interpreted in poems by McHugh and then further modified by Phillips. One of Phillips's images, "A Humument: A Treated Victorian Novel," from the collaboration is appropriately used on the cover of McHugh's essay collection Broken English: Poetry and Partiality (1993).

In 1994, Hinge & Sign: Poems 1968–1993, a collection of 24 new poems and selected poems from her five earlier books, was published by the Wesleyan University Press. The book won both the Harvard Review/Daniel Pollock Prize in 1995 and Boston Book Review's Bingham Poetry Prize and was a finalist for the National Book Award. The New York Times Book Review chose this poetry collection as a "Notable Book of the Year." In 1996, after the book's publication, she received a Lila Wallace/Reader's Digest Writing Award.

In 1998, McHugh received the Folger Library's O.B. Hardison Prize, recognising her as a poet who excels in teaching. In 1999, she was elected a Chancellor of the Academy of American Poets and received the PEN/Voelker Award. During this year, her poetry was anthologized in The New Bread Loaf Anthology of Contemporary American Poetry, alongside poets laureate like Rita Dove and Robert Pinsky, and other contemporaries like Charles Wright, Lucille Clifton, James Tate, Philip Levine, and Marilyn Hacker. McHugh also began to serve as a judge for numerous poetry competitions, including the National Poetry Series and the Laughlin Prize. She was a member of the Board of Directors for the Associated Writing Programs between 1981 and 1983. She served on the Literature Panel for the National Endowment for the Arts during 1983 and 1986. In 1991, she was the Coal-Royalty Chair at the University of Alabama. In 1992, McHugh was the Elliston Poet at the University of Cincinnati. In 1991, she was the visiting professor at the University of Iowa and, in 1994, at the University of California at Los Angeles.

She takes editing collections of younger poets seriously, and helped to select poems for Hammer and Blaze: a Gathering of Contemporary American Poets (2001), published by the University of Georgia Press, which she co-edited with Ellen Bryant Voigt. About her role in guest editing Ploughshares in Spring 2001, McHugh writes, "The sheer syntactical elegance of many of these new poems suggests an instrumental refinement for which I'm grateful: I'm an old Richard Wilbur/Anthony Hecht fan, and have had reason now and then to regret, during my quarter century of teaching in M.F.A. programs, the relative unfashionability of rhetorical flourish."

At the end of 2001, McHugh's sixth collection of poetry, The Father of the Predicaments, was published by the Wesleyan University Press. That same year, McHugh, with Nikolai Popov, received the first International Griffin Poetry Prize in translation for Glottal Stop: 101 Poems by Paul Celan. Her next poetry collection, Eyeshot, was published in 2003 by Wesleyan University Press, and Upgraded to Serious was released in 2009 both by Copper Canyon Press in the US and by Anansi in Canada.

McHugh was a judge for the 2012 Griffin Poetry Prize.

In 2020, Copper Canyon Press published Mchugh's Muddy Matterhorn, a collection of poems from the previous decade, which the New York Times described as "a vortex of strangeness", where "high and low interchange in Dickinson-like reversals". In 2023, McHugh collaborated with artist Lior Shamriz, who created music and visuals to a selection of six of her poems.

In 2026, her chapbook ‘It Looks Like a Man’ was published by Wesleyan University Press. '

== Awards and honors ==
- Two grants from the National Endowment for the Arts
- Griffin Poetry Prize
- Fellowship from the Guggenheim Foundation
- Milliman Distinguished Writer-in-Residence, University of Washington
- Finalist for the National Book Award
- Finalist for the Pulitzer Prize
- Witter Bynner Fellowship
- PEN/Voelcker Award for Poetry
- O. B. Hardison, Jr. Poetry Prize
- MacArthur Fellowship

== Bibliography ==
=== Poetry collections ===
- Dangers. New York: Houghton Mifflin, 1977
- A World of Difference. New York: Houghton Mifflin, 1981
- To the Quick, Middletown: Wesleyan University Press, 1987, ISBN 978-0-8195-5156-6
- Shades. Middletown: Wesleyan University Press. 1988. ISBN 978-0-8195-1137-9.
- Hinge & Sign: Poems 1968-1993. Middletown: Wesleyan University Press. 1994. ISBN 978-0-8195-7212-7.
- The Father of the Predicaments. Middletown: Wesleyan University Press. 1999. ISBN 978-0-8195-6506-8.
- Eyeshot. Middletown: Wesleyan University Press. 2003. ISBN 978-0-8195-6672-0. "Heather McHugh."
- Upgraded to Serious. Copper Canyon Press. 2009. ISBN 978-1-55659-306-2.
- Muddy Matterhorn. Copper Canyon Press. 2020. ISBN 978-1-55659-5967.

=== Editor ===
- The Best American Poetry 2007, Guest editor (2007)
- Ploughshares Spring 2001, Guest editor (2001)
- Michigan Quarterly Review 57: 4, Guest editor (2018)

=== Essays ===
- Broken English: Poetry and Partiality, University Press of New England, 1993, ISBN 978-0-8195-6272-2; Wesleyan University Press, 2011, ISBN 978-0-8195-7211-0

=== Translations ===
- D'Apres Tout—Poems by Jean Follain. Princeton: Princeton University Press, 1981, ISBN 978-0-691-01372-5
- Because the Sea is Black: Poems by Blaga Dimitrova, Translators: McHugh and Nikolai Popov, Middletown: Wesleyan University Press, 1989, ISBN 978-0-8195-2166-8
- Celan, Paul (2004). Glottal Stop: 101 Poems by Paul Celan. Translated by McHugh; Popov. Middletown: Wesleyan University Press. ISBN 978-0819567208.
- Euripides: Cyclops. Translated by McHugh; David Konstan. New York: Oxford University Press. 2001. ISBN 978-0-19-803265-6.
