= Shane Book =

Canadian poet

Shane Book is a Canadian poet. He was a shortlisted nominee for the 2015 Griffin Poetry Prize for his second collection, Congotronic.

Of Trinidadian descent, Book is based in Ottawa. His first poetry collection, Ceiling of Sticks, was published in 2010, and he was a finalist for the CBC Literary Awards in 2011 for "Almost Spain". He obtained his M.F.A. at the Iowa Writers’ Workshop and was a Stegner Fellow at Stanford University.

== Bibliography ==
- Ceiling of Sticks. University of Nebraska Press, 2010. ISBN 9780803215580
- Congotronic. University of Iowa Press, 2014. ISBN 9781609383077
- All Black Everything. University of Iowa Press, 2023. ISBN 9781609389239
