= Elizabeth Oehlkers Wright =

American translator (born 1966)

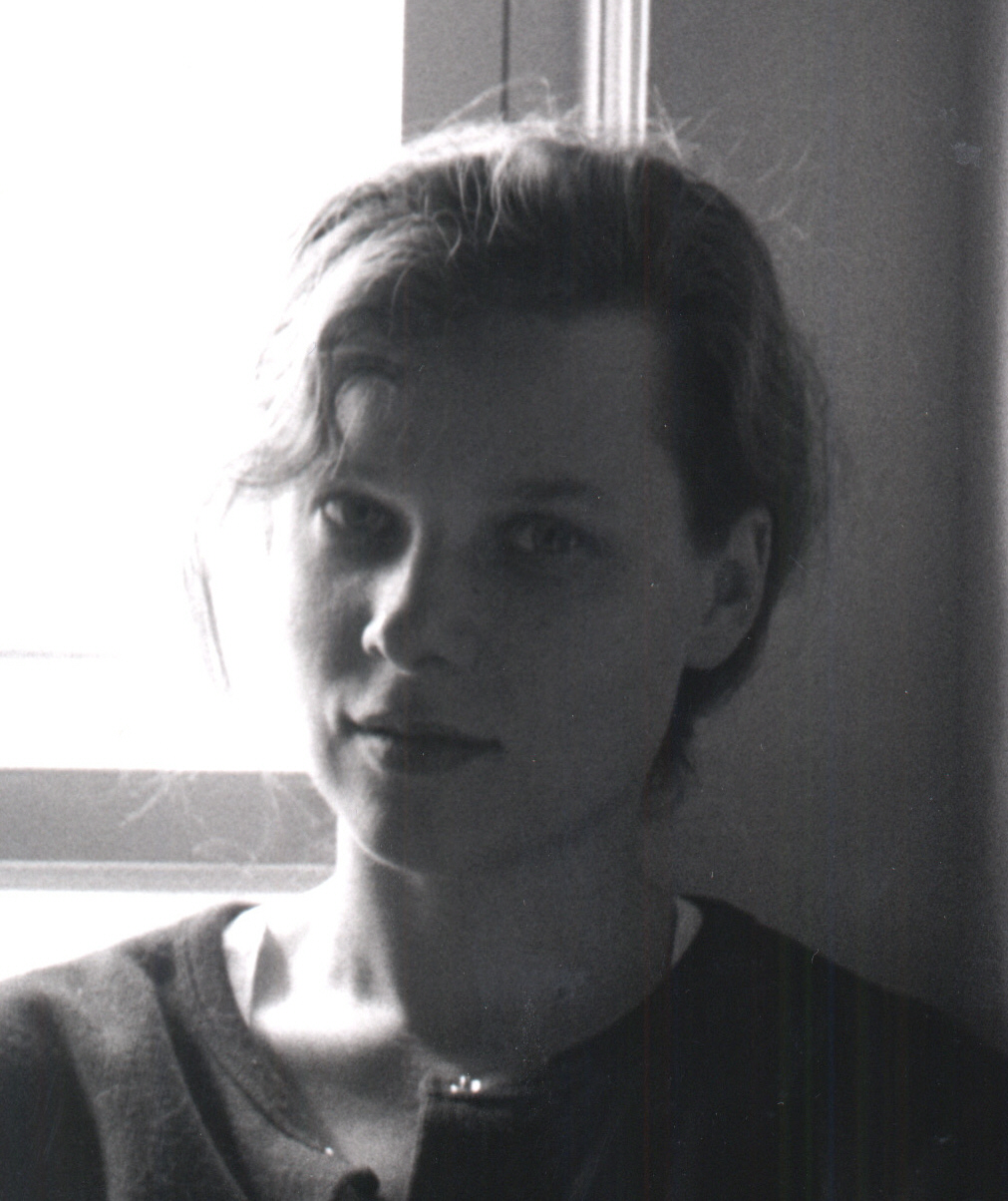
- photo by Franz Wright
- Born: October 3, 1966 (age 59) Baltimore, Maryland, United States
- Occupation: Translator
- Genre: Lyric poetry, non-fiction

Elizabeth Oehlkers Wright (born Elizabeth (Ann) Oehlkers on October 3, 1966) is an American translator.

== Biography ==
Elizabeth Oehlkers Wright translates texts of contemporary German authors, especially lyric poetry, into English. In 1996 she received a MFA for literary translation at the University of Arkansas. From September 1994 till July 1995 during an academic year in Berlin she had been translating, amongst others, the German-Turkish poets Zafer Şenocak and Zehra Çırak. After that she worked as a lecturer in Arkansas, and gave seminars at Boston University and at Oberlin College. Together with Zafer Şenocak she had bilingual readings in Memphis, New York City, Cambridge, San Francisco und Los Angeles. She received several awards and research fellowships like NEA and ALTA. Her translations appear in Agni, Slope, Seneca Review, Another Chicago Magazine and in the online magazine Perihelion.

In 1999 Elizabeth Oehlkers Wright married Franz Wright, poet and Pulitzer Prize winner of 2004. They lived in Waltham, Massachusetts until his death. Elizabeth Oehlkers Wright works at a medical translation agency in Boston.

== Translations ==
- Ernst Peter Fischer: Beauty and the Beast. The Aesthetic Moment in Science, 1999
- documentary film directed by Harald Ortlieb about Zehra Çirak and the Berlin sculptor Jürgen Walter, 2007 (translated in collaboration with Marilya Veteto Reese)
- Zafer Şenocak: Door Languages, 2008
- Valzhyna Mort: Factory of Tears. Copper Canyon Press, 2008 (translated from Belarusian language in collaboration with the author and Franz Wright)
- translations for literary journals and anthologies like New European Poets, Anthology of World Literature of the 20th Century and Green Integer. Anthology of World Poetry of the 20th Century
