= Brian Henderson (poet) =

Canadian poet (born 1948)

Brian Henderson (born 1948) is a Canadian writer, poet, and photographer, whose book of poetry Nerve Language was shortlisted for the Governor General's Award for Poetry in 2007.

== Biography ==
Henderson, born in 1948 in Kitchener, Ontario, has a PhD in Canadian Literature from York University. Henderson has worked as a university instructor, a phone jack installer, a traffic counter, a shipper/receiver, and a rock drummer.

He is the author of thirteen collections of poetry including The Alphamiricon, a deck of visual poem-cards. His work has been published in many small magazines. In the 1970s Henderson was a founding editor of RUNE.

He was the director of Wilfrid Laurier University Press from 2005-2016.

== Literary activities ==
His poetry and literary criticism has appeared in Arc Poetry Magazine, Antigonish Review, Canadian Forum, Canadian Literature, CVII, Descant, ECW, The Fiddlehead, Prism, Quarry, Rampike, RUNE (of which he was a founding editor for its decade of existence), Scrivener, Writ and many other literary journals since 1974.

== Awards ==
=== Nominations ===
- Governor General's Award for Poetry, 2007, finalist (for Nerve Language)
- Canadian Author’s Association Award for Poetry, 2012, finalist (for Sharawadji)
- Raymond Souster Award, 2020, longlisted

== Published works ==
Books:

- Unfinishing, McGill-Queen's University Press, 2022
- Unidentified Poetic Object, Brick Books, 2019
- [OR], Talonbooks, 2014
- Sharawadji, Brick Books, 2011
- Nerve Language, Pedlar Press, 2007
- Light in Dark Objects, Ekstasis Editions, 2000
- Year Zero, Brick Books, 1995
- Smoking Mirror, ECW Press, 1990
- The Alphamiricon, Underwhich Editions, 1987; available on Ubu.com/visual poetry
- Migration of Light, General Publishing, 1983
- The Veridical Book of the Silent Planet, Aya Press, 1978
- Paracelsus, Porcupine's Quill, 1977
- The Expanding Room, Black Moss Press, 1977

Anthologies:

- W.H. New, ed., Inside the Poem, Oxford University Press, 1992
- Robert Allen, ed., The Lyric Paragraph, D.C. Books, 1987
- Leslie Nutting, ed., The Toronto Collection, Manoeuvers Press, 1984
- Ken Norris, Twenty Canadian Poets of the Eighties, Anansi, 1984
