= PEN/Voelcker Award for Poetry =

The PEN/Voelcker Award for Poetry is given biennially to an American poet whose distinguished and growing body of work to date represents a notable and accomplished presence in American literature.

The award is one of many PEN awards sponsored by International PEN affiliates in over 145 PEN centers around the world. The PEN America awards have been characterized as being among the "major" American literary prizes.

== Winners ==
PEN/Voelcker Award for Poetry winners
Year	Recipient	Judges	Ref.
1994	Jane Kenyon		
1996	Franz Wright		
1998	C. K. Williams		
2000	Heather McHugh		
2002	Frederick Seidel		
2004	Robert Pinsky		
2006	Linda Gregg	Michael Hofmann, Timothy Liu, and Vijay Seshadri	
2008	Kimiko Hahn	Kwame Dawes, Mark Doty, and Marie Howe	
2010	Marilyn Hacker	Christopher Ricks, Marie Ponsot, and David Ferry	
2012	Toi Derricotte	Dan Chiasson, Aracelis Girmay, and A. Van Jordan	
2014	Frank Bidart	Peg Boyers, Toi Derricotte, and Rowan Ricardo Phillips	
2016	Ed Roberson	Catherine Barnett, Jericho Brown, and Tina Chang	
2018	Kamau Brathwaite	Ed Roberson, Natalie Scenters-Zapico, and Ocean Vuong	
2020	Rigoberto González	Cornelius Eady, Linda Gregerson, Deborah Paredez, and Monica Youn	
2021	Victoria Chang		
2022	Diane Seuss	Lillian-Yvonne Bertram, Lia Purpura, and Safiya Sinclair	
2023	Robin Coste Lewis		
2025	Frank X Walker		

== See also ==
- American poetry
- List of poetry awards
- List of literary awards
- List of years in poetry
- List of years in literature
