= Sarah Riggs =

American poet

Sarah Riggs (b. 1971, New York City) is an American poet, filmmaker, visual artist, and translator. She is the author of eight collections of poetry.

Her films and films she has produced have screened at Anthology Film Archives, the Berlinale, Cinémathèque de Tanger, Jeu de Paume, Tate Modern, 98 Weeks, The Virginia Woolf Film Festival, and others. She has had solo exhibitions at FiveMyles Gallery (New York), galerie éof (Paris), and Salon du Salon (Marseille).

Her translation of Etel Adnan's TIME (Nightboat, 2019) was awarded the Griffin Poetry Prize and the Best Translated Book Award.

In 2005, she co-founded the nonprofit art organization Tamaas which has produced an ongoing poet-to-poet Translation Seminar for twenty years, from which she co-edited the poetry collection Another Room to Live In: 15 Contemporary Arab Poets (Litmus Press, 2024) and seven editions of READ: A Journal of Inter-Translation.

She received her B.A. from Amherst College and her Ph.D. in English from University of Michigan. She has previously taught at NYU Paris, Reid Hall, Pratt Institute, and the Naropa University Summer Writing Program. Her mentors include Etel Adnan, Michael Palmer, Cecilia Vicuña, Anne Waldman, and others.

She is a member of the bilingual experimental poetry association Double Change.

== Books in English ==
- Lines (Winter Editions, 2025)
- The Nerve Epistle (Roof Books, 2021)
- Eavesdrop (Chax Press, 2020)
- Pomme & Granite (1913 Press, 2015) – Winner of the 1913 Press Poetry Prize, 2015.
- Autobiography of Envelopes (Burning Deck, 2012)
- 60 Textos (Ugly Duckling Presse, 2010)
- Waterwork (Chax Press, 2007)
- Chain of Minuscule Decisions in the Form of a Feeling (Reality Street Editions, 2007)

== Books in French ==
- Murmurations, trans. by Marie Borel and Jérémy Victor Robert (Éditions Apic, 2021)
- Chaîne de décisions minuscules dans la forme d'une sensation, trans. by Stéphane Bouquet, Virginie Lalucq, Jérôme Mauche, Eric Suchère, Bénédicte Vilgrain (le bleu du ciel, 2010)
- 43 post-it, trans. by Françoise Valéry and Marie Borel (Éditions de l'Attente, 2009)
- 60 textos, trans. by Françoise Valéry (Éditions de l'Attente, 2007)
- 28 télégrammes, translated by Françoise Valéry (Éditions de l'Attente, 2006)

== Literary Criticism ==
- Word Sightings: Poetry and Visual Media in Stevens, Bishop, and O'Hara (Routledge, 2002).

== Translations ==
- Another Room to Live In: 15 Contemporary Arab Poets, co-edited and original translations of poems by Etel Adnan and Souad Labbize (Litmus Press, 2024)
- Love is Colder than the Lake by Liliane Giraudon, co-translated with Lindsay Turner (Nightboat, 2024)
- Your Name, Palestine by Olivia Elias, co-translated with Jérémy Victor Robert (World Poetry Books, 2023)
- TIME by Etel Adnan (Nightboat, 2019) – Winner of the Griffin Poetry Prize and Best Translated Book Award, 2020. Lambda Literary Award Finalist, 2020.
- Present Participle by Oscarine Bosquet, co-translated by Ellen LeBlond-Schrader (La Presse, 2013)
- Face Before Against by Isabelle Garron (Litmus Press, 2008)
- Two Markets, Once Again by Ryoko Sekiguchi (Litmus Press, 2008)
- Wolftrot by Marie Borel, co-translated with Omar Berrada (Fence Books, 2006)

== Film ==
- Outrider (2025) – Producer
- Six Lives: A Cinepoem (2016) – Director, Screenwriter
- The Tangier 8 (2009) — Producer

== Exhibitions ==
- The Emotional Earth: Portraits, Salon Du Salon, 2023, Marseille
- Amulet Sonnets: Sarah Riggs, FiveMyles Gallery, 2019, New York
- Isibilités: Sarah Riggs, galerie éof, 2006, Paris
- Portraits of Poets: Sarah Riggs, Berl's Brooklyn Poetry Shop, 2019, New York
