= Halyna Kruk =

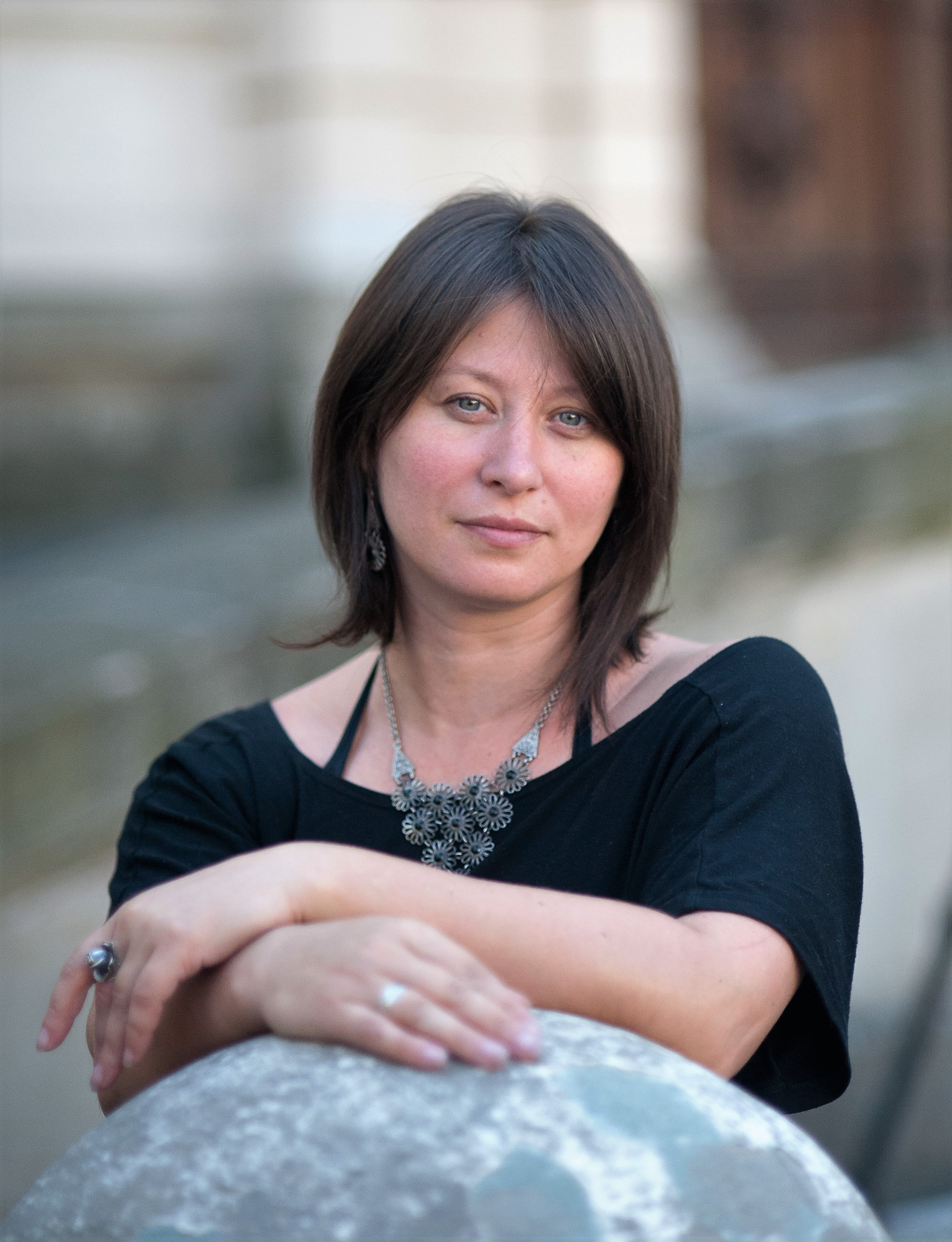
- Kruk in 2015
- Born: 30 November 1974; Lviv, Ukraine
- Writing career
- Genres: poetry, children's literature

Halyna Kruk (Ukrainian: Гали́на Григо́рівна Крук; born 30 November 1974) is a Ukrainian writer, translator, educator and literary critic. Her surname also appears as Krouk.

== Life ==
She was born in Lviv, Ukraine and was educated at the University of Lviv, earning a PhD in Ukrainian literature in 2001. She is a professor of literary studies at the university; her research focuses on medieval literature in Ukraine.

Her first two collections of poetry were published in 1997: Mandry u Poshukakh Domu ("Journeys in Search of Home") and Slidy na Pisku ("Footprints on Sand"). She also writes poetry and fiction for children. Her books for children have been translated into 15 languages. Her poems have been translated into German, English, and Russian. Her work has also been included in various anthologies.

Kruk translates other writers' work from Polish into Ukrainian.

Kruk has been vice-president of the Ukrainian branch of the writer's organisation PEN. In 1996–97, she won the literary competitions Pryvitannia Zhyttia and Granoslov. In 2003, she was awarded the Gaude Polonia Fellowship by the Polish Ministry of Culture. In the same year, she won the Step by Step international competition for children's books. Her 2022 book, A Crash Course in Molotov Cocktails, was a finalist for the Griffin Poetry Prize. She has participated in the Baltic Centre for Writers and Translators' program.

== Selected works ==
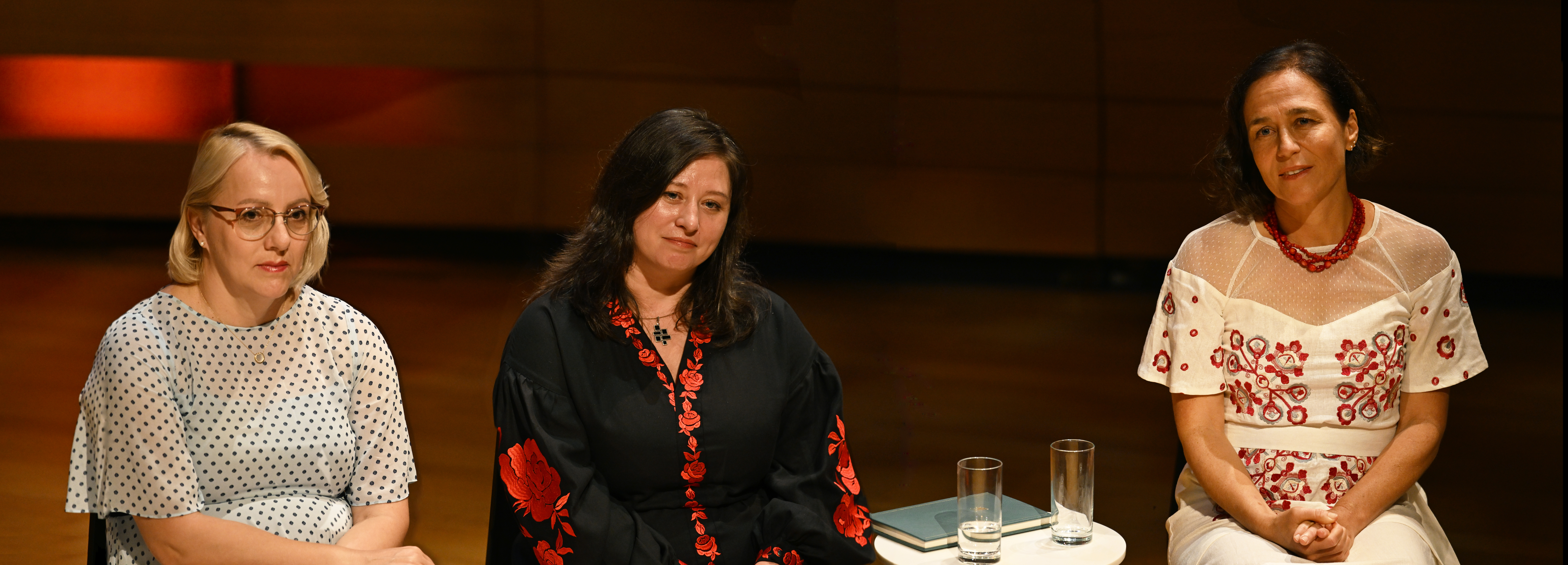
Yuliya Ilchuk, Halyna Kruk and Amelia M. Glaser at the ceremony of the Griffin Prize in the Koerner Hall in Toronto

Poetry

- A Crash Course in Molotov Cocktails (2022)
- Grown-Up (2017)
- (Co)existence (2013)
- The Face beyond the Photograph (2005)
- Footprints on Sand (1997)
- Journeys in Search of a Home (1997)

Children's Literature

- Marko Travels Around the World (2003)
- It's Hard to Be the Youngest (2003)

== See also ==
- List of Ukrainian-language poets
- List of Ukrainian women writers
- List of Ukrainian literature translated into English
