= Suzanne Buffam =

Canadian poet

Suzanne Buffam is a Canadian poet, author of three collections of poetry, and associate professor of practice in the arts at the University of Chicago. Her third collection, A Pillow Book, was named by the New York Times as one of the ten best books of poetry in 2016. Her first, Past Imperfect (House of Anansi Press, 2005), won the Gerald Lampert Award in 2006. Her second, The Irrationalist (Carnarium Books, 2010), was shortlisted for the 2011 Griffin Poetry Prize. Her poems have been published in literary journals and magazines including The New York Times, Poetry, Jubilat, A Public Space, Denver Quarterly, Colorado Review, Books in Canada, and Prairie Schooner; and in anthologies including Breathing Fire: Canada's New Poets. She earned an MA in English from Concordia University in Montreal, and an MFA from the Iowa Writers' Workshop. Born in Montreal and raised in Vancouver, B.C., she lives in Chicago. Buffam was a judge for the 2013 Griffin Poetry Prize.

== Awards ==
- 2012 National Endowment for the Arts Award
- 2011 Jeannette Heian Ballard Writers' Trust Award
- 2006 Gerald Lampert Award
- 1998 CBC Literary Award for Poetry
