= Srikanth Reddy =

American poet (born 1973)

- Born: 1973 (age 52–53)
- Occupation: Scholar

Srikanth Reddy (born 1973) is an American scholar, poet and writer. He received National Endowment for the Arts fellowship, a Creative Capital Award In 2013, and Guggenheim fellowship in 2018

Reddy delivered the Bagley Wright Lectures in Poetry in fall 2015, and served as a judge for the 2019 Griffin Poetry Prize.

== Early life and education ==
Reddy was born in the United States to Telugu physician parents from southern India. He earned a Bachelor of Arts degree and a Doctor of Philosophy degree from Harvard University, and a Master of Fine Arts degree from the Iowa Writers' Workshop.

== Career ==
He is Professor of English and Creative Writing at the University of Chicago.

His poetry has been published in Jacket magazine, Poetry Northwest, Harper's Magazine, and The Guardian, and his literary criticism has appeared in The New York Times, Lana Turner, Raritan, PEN America, and other publications.

In October 2021, Reddy was announced as the editor of Phoenix Poets, a book series published by the University of Chicago Press, and in December 2022, he assumed the role of poetry editor for The Paris Review.

== Works ==
- Facts for Visitors: Poems. University of California Press. March 20, 2004. ISBN 978-0-520-93759-8.
- Voyager. University of California Press. January 8, 2011. ISBN 978-0-520-94826-6.
- Readings in World Literature. Omnidawn. 1 September 2012. ISBN 9781890650643
- Changing Subjects: Digressions in Modern American Poetry. Oxford University Press, USA. July 12, 2012. ISBN 978-0-19-979102-6.
- Underworld Lit. Wave Books. August 4, 2020. ISBN 9781940696935.
- The Unsignificant. Wave Books. September 17, 2024. ISBN 9798891060067.
