= Nikolai B. Popov =

Translator

Nikolai Boris Popov
- Born: 1952 (age 73–74)

Academic work
- Institutions: University of Washington

Nikolai Boris Popov (Bulgarian: Николай Борис Попов) (born 1952) is a translator.

== Life ==
Popove graduated from University of Washington, with a Ph.D., in 1994. In 2001, he participated at a conference at University of Iowa International Writing Program. He teaches English and Comparative Literature at the University of Washington. A James Joyce scholar and translator, he co-translated with Heather McHugh a collection of the poems of Blaga Dimitrova, and Paul Celan. On May 13, 2012, he fell into a crevasse while skiing near Whistler but was unscathed.

From 1987 to 2010 he was married to poet Heather McHugh.

== Awards ==
- 2001 Griffin Poetry Prize

== Translations ==
- Paul Celan (February 25, 2004). Glottal Stop: 101 Poems by Paul Celan. Translated by Nikolai Popov; Heather McHugh. Wesleyan Poetry. ISBN 978-0-8195-6720-8.
