= Armand Garnet Ruffo =

Canadian scholar, filmmaker, writer and poet of Anishinaabe-Ojibwe ancestry

- Born: 1955 (age 70–71); Chapleau, Ontario, Canada
- Occupation: Poet

Academic background
- Education: University of Windsor; University of Ottawa

Armand Garnet Ruffo (born in Chapleau, Ontario) is a Canadian scholar, filmmaker, writer and poet of Anishinaabe-Ojibwe ancestry. He is a member of the Chapleau (Fox Lake) Cree First Nation.

== Life ==
Since receiving degrees from York University, the University of Ottawa and the University of Windsor, he has worked primarily as a scholar, teacher and writer. His scholarly and creative writing has appeared in numerous literary anthologies and journals.

In the past, Ruffo has taught creative writing at the Banff Centre for the Arts and the Tŷ Newydd” Centre for Literature Wales, in addition to Indigenous literature at the En'owkin International School of Writing in Penticton, B.C., and at Carleton University in Ottawa. He currently resides in Kingston, Ontario, and teaches at Queen's University, where he is the Queen's National Scholar in Indigenous Literature.

In 2002, Ruffo was awarded the Archibald Lampman Award for At Geronimo's Grave, and, in 2010, his feature film A Windigo Tale was awarded Best Film at the 35th Annual American Indian Film Festival in San Francisco and Best Feature Film at the Dreamspeakers International Film Festival in Edmonton. Other awards he has received are the Creator Award in 2017, as part of the Mayor’s Arts Awards from the City of Kingston, and, in 2022, the Principal’s Teaching and Learning Award in Indigenous Education from Queen’s University.

His publications include Grey Owl: The Mystery of Archie Belaney (1996/2022), Norval Morrisseau: Man Changing Into Thunderbird (2014),The Thunderbird Poems (2015), TREATY# (2019) and The Dialogues: the Song of Francis Pegahmagabow (2024). Both Norval Morrisseau: Man Changing Into Thunderbird, and Treaty# were finalists for the Governor General's Literary Awards. As a scholar, Ruffo has edited (Ad)Dressing Our Words: Aboriginal Perspectives on Aboriginal Literatures (2001); An Anthology of Canadian Native Literature in English (2013); Introduction to Indigenous Literary Criticism (2016); An Anthology of Indigenous Literatures in English: Voices from Canada (2020); and Reclamation and Resurgence: The Poetry of Marilyn Dumont (2024).

In 2020 he was named the winner of the Latner Writers' Trust Poetry Prize.
