= General Kinetics Engineering Corporation =

Canada's General Kinetics Engineering Corporation designs and manufactures components for military and other tracked vehicles and high-speed rail.

Based in Brampton, Ontario, Scott Griffin is its chairman, director and majority shareholder.

In 2013, they were awarded a $16.76 million subcontract, manufacturing vehicle struts for an upgrade to the Canadian Armed Forces' fleet of light armoured vehicles.
