= Doyali Islam =

Canadian poet (born 1984)

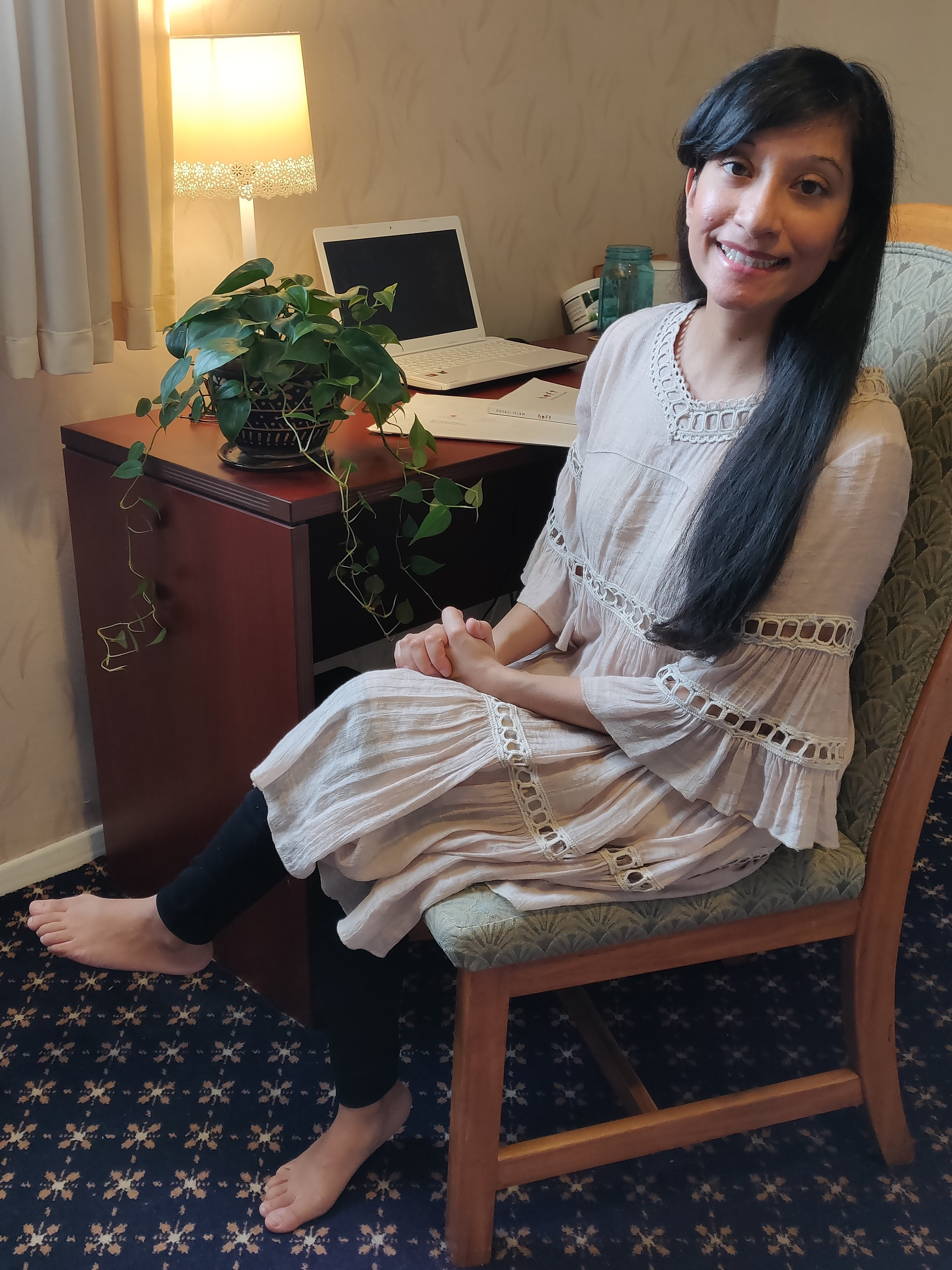
- Doyali Islam
- Born: October 7, 1984 (age 41)
- Education: University of Toronto
- Occupation: Poet
- Notable work: heft (McClelland & Stewart, 2019)
- Awards: Griffin Poetry Prize finalist (2020); Trillium Book Award for Poetry finalist (2020); Pat Lowther Memorial Award finalist (2020)
- Website: www.doyali-islam.com

Doyali Islam (born 7 October 1984) is a Canadian poet. She is most noted for her 2019 poetry collection heft, which was a finalist for the 2020 Griffin Poetry Prize.

Her poems have appeared in a number of literary magazines including The Kenyon Review Online and The Fiddlehead, and in a number of anthologies including Best Canadian Poetry and The Manifesto Project.

Her first poetry collection, Yusuf and the Lotus Flower, was published by Ottawa small press BuschekBooks in 2011.

She has been the poetry editor of Arc Poetry Magazine, and the editor of Write, the Writers' Union of Canada's member magazine.

== Works ==
- Yusuf and the Lotus Flower. BuschekBooks. 2011. ISBN 978-1894543668.
- heft. McClelland & Stewart. 2019. ISBN 978-0771005596.
