= Jane Munro =

Canadian poet (born 1943)

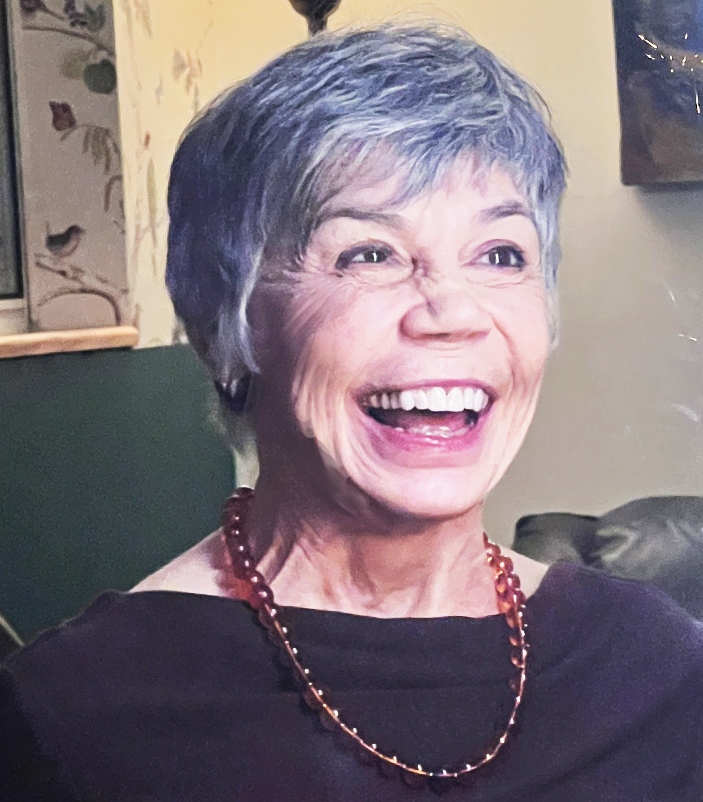
- Jane Munro, December 2023
- Born: December 3, 1943 (age 82); North Vancouver, British Columbia, Canada
- Occupations: Poet, Writer, and Educator
- Website: janemunro.com

Jane Munro (born December 3, 1943) is a Canadian writer, poet and educator. She has published eight collections of poetry including Blue Sonoma, which won the 2015 Griffin Poetry Prize, a prose memoir "Open Every Window, 2020" and a chapbook of short prose pieces.

She belongs to the poetry collective Yoko's Dogs along with Susan Gillis, Jan Conn, and Mary di Michele. Yoko's Dogs has published three collections of collaborative poetry.

Munro was born in North Vancouver, British Columbia, in 1943 and raised in Vancouver and North Vancouver. She studied at the University of British Columbia, undergraduate, M.F.A. and Ed.D., Indiana University B.A. and Simon Fraser University M.A. where she worked with poet Robin Blaser. She taught creative writing in several Vancouver universities and has given readings across Canada, in the USA, England, Ireland, Italy, Egypt and India. Her most recent poetry collection is "False Creek, 2022".

Munro uses a blend of Eastern and Western styles in her compositions. She is a practitioner of Iyengar yoga and currently lives in Vancouver.
