= August Kleinzahler =

American poet (born 1949)

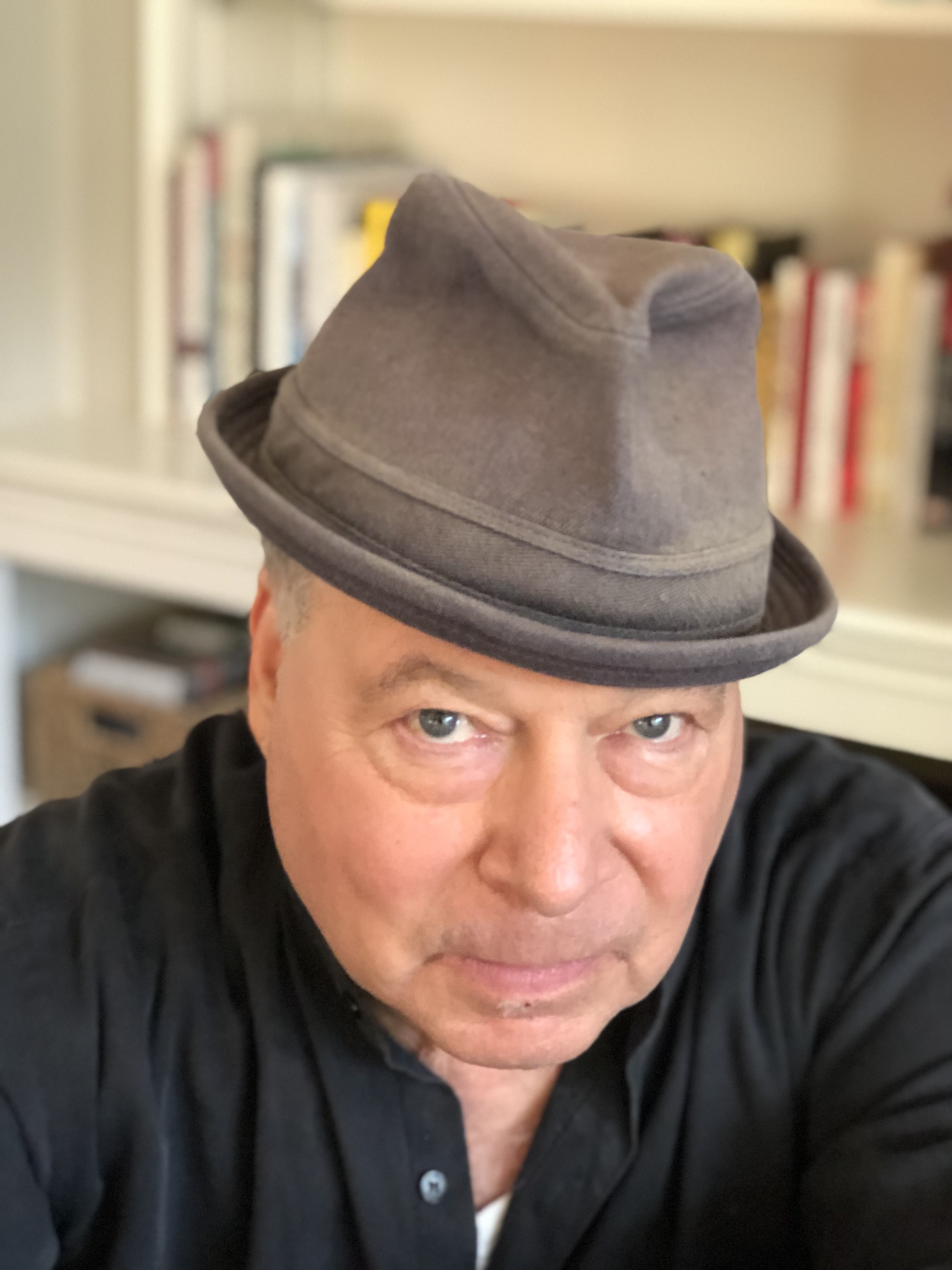
- Kleinzahler in 2024
- Born: August Kleinzahler; December 10, 1949 (age 76); Jersey City, New Jersey, U.S.
- Education: University of Wisconsin–Madison; University of Victoria
- Occupation: Poet

August Kleinzahler (born December 10, 1949) is an American poet.

== Life and career ==
Until he was 11, he went to school in Fort Lee, New Jersey, where he grew up. He then commuted to the Horace Mann School in the Bronx, graduating in 1967. He wrote poetry from this time, inspired by Keats and Kenneth Rexroth translations, among other works. He started college at the University of Wisconsin–Madison but dropped out and after taking a year out of school, he ended up, 1971, at the University of Victoria on Vancouver Island, British Columbia. Drawn to the New York poets, including Frank O’Hara, Kleinzahler then discovered the work of Basil Bunting, who had a major influence on Kleinzahler's search for his own voice in poetry. He described Bunting's 1966 long poem Briggflatts (which its author described as "an autobiography, but not a statement of fact") as "everything I wanted in poetry.” Bunting taught a creative writing course at Victoria: "He began with some poems by Hardy and Hopkins, The Wreck of the Deutschland, and went up to Yeats and Pound, then David Jones, Williams, the poets who were important to Bunting, Hugh MacDiarmid, Lorine Niedecker, and H.D. All he did was smoke unfiltered Player's and read to us". The Anglo-American poet Thom Gunn (1929–2004) was also a major influence: "the honest treatment of the poetic material at hand, not slipping into rhetorical or poetic postures, inflating subject matter or dodging difficulty," Kleinzahler explained in an interview in The Paris Review in the fall of 2007. Gunn would become a close friend. William Carlos Williams was also an important source of inspiration.

Amassing gambling debts and wanted by the police, Kleinzahler's brother committed suicide in 1971, when the poet was 21. They were very close and Kleinzahler was devastated by the death. The book Storm over Hackensack is dedicated to him and Cutty, One Rock is about him. Kleinzahler commented "he remains a sort of lodestar for me, encouraging my better, braver self."

After college, Kleinzahler spent a year in Alaska working in "manpower jobs: hard labor" and then got a job at the Alaska State Museum. He got his teaching credential and then lived in Montreal for two and a half years. A passionate blues lover, Kleinzahler wrote a music column for the San Diego Reader for many years. He has lived in the Haight Ashbury neighborhood in San Francisco but has retained strong ties to his old home base in New Jersey. In 2005 he was named the first poet laureate of Fort Lee.

Kleinzahler is the author of ten books of poetry, including The Strange Hours Travelers Keep and Sleeping It Off in Rapid City. He has also published a non-fiction work, Cutty, One Rock (Low Characters and Strange Places, Gently Explained). Allen Ginsberg commented: "August Kleinzahler's verse line is always precise, concrete, intelligent and rare - that quality of 'chiseled' verse memorable in Bunting's and Pound's work. A loner, a genius."

== Awards ==
- 1989 Guggenheim Fellowship
- 2000 Berlin Prize
- 2004 Griffin Poetry Prize
- 2008 Lannan Literary Award in Poetry for Sleeping it Off in Rapid City
- 2008 National Book Critics Circle Award in Poetry for Sleeping it Off in Rapid City.

== Bibliography ==
=== Poetry collections ===
- Kleinzahler, August (1977). The sausage master of Minsk : poems. Villeneuve.
- A Calendar of Airs, Coach House Press, 1978, ISBN 978-0-88910-103-6
- Storm over Hackensack, Moyer Bell Ltd, 1985, ISBN 978-0-918825-08-7
- Earthquake Weather, Moyer Bell Ltd, 1989, ISBN 978-0-918825-98-8
- Like cities, like storms, Picador Australia, 1992, ISBN 978-0-330-27321-3
- Red Sauce, Whiskey and Snow, Farrar Straus & Giroux, 1995, ISBN 978-0-571-17431-7
- Green Sees Things in Waves, Farrar, Straus and Giroux, 1999, ISBN 9780374525842
- Live from the Hong Kong Nile Club : Poems: 1975-1990, Farrar, Straus and Giroux, 2000, ISBN 978-0-571-20428-1
- The Strange Hours Travelers Keep, Farrar, Straus and Giroux, 2004, ISBN 9780374529413 (winner of the 2004 International Griffin Poetry Prize)
- Sleeping It Off in Rapid City, Farrar, Straus and Giroux, 2008, ISBN 978-0-374-26583-0 (winner of the 2008 National Book Critics Circle Award)
- The Hotel Oneira, Farrar, Straus and Giroux, 2013, ISBN 978-0-374-17293-0
- Before Dawn on Bluff Road / Hollyhocks in the Fog: Selected New Jersey Poems / Selected San Francisco Poems, Farrar, Straus and Giroux, 2017 ISBN 9780374282110
- Snow Approaching on the Hudson, Farrar, Straus and Giroux, 2020 ISBN 9780374266271

=== Prose ===
- Cutty, One Rock : Low Characters and Strange Places, Gently Explained, Farrar, Straus and Giroux, 2005, ISBN 978-0-374-53018-1
- Music: I-LXXIV, Pressed Wafer, 2009, ISBN 978-0-9785156-9-0
- Sallies, Romps, Portraits, and Send-Offs: Selected Prose, 2000-2016, Farrar, Straus and Giroux, 2017, ISBN 9780374282097
- (as editor with Michael Nott and Clive Wilmer) The Letters of Thom Gunn, Faber & Faber, 2021, ISBN 9780571362554

=== Critical studies and reviews of Kleinzahler ===
- Matthews, Steven (Jun–Jul 2014). "Curious insulations". The London Magazine: 25–30. Review of The Hotel Oneira.
