= David McFadden (poet) =

Canadian poet (1940–2018)

David William McFadden (October 11, 1940 – June 6, 2018) was a Canadian poet, fiction writer, and travel writer.

== Biography ==
McFadden was born in Hamilton, Ontario, and began writing poetry while still in high school, publishing in literary magazines, corresponding with Beat writer Jack Kerouac, and becoming a proofreader for the Hamilton Spectator newspaper. As he gained success as a poet he quit the newspaper devoting himself full-time to literature in 1976.

McFadden served on the editorial board of Coach House Press, and as a contributing editor for SwiftCurrent and Canadian Art Magazine. He was a monthly columnist for Quill and Quire and Hamilton This Month. He taught at David Thompson University Centre for three years and was a member of the production team of the literary journal Brick.

McFadden's poetry critiques the commercialism and shallowness of modern society. His work, with its overt humour, reflections on contemporary urban life, and interest in the mistakes of the imagination is influenced by Frank O'Hara, John Ashbery and the New York School of the 1950s, as well as the Beat writers of the 1960s such as Allen Ginsberg and Lawrence Ferlinghetti. His work focuses on Canadian subjects, settings and personalities. His book of 100 Baudelaire-inspired prose poems, Gypsy Guitar, was called "everyone's favourite book of poems" by George Bowering.

McFadden is a founding member of GOSH (Gentlemen of Sensible Height), and a former member of International PEN, the Writer's Union of Canada, the League of Canadian Poets, and the Last Minute Club.

In 2012, McFadden was diagnosed with logopenic variant primary progressive aphasia, a type of Alzheimer's disease that affects a person's memory of words, and shortly thereafter he became one of the first participants in a study of the effects of aerobic exercise on people already affected by dementia.

== Works ==
=== Poetry ===
- The Poem Poem – 1967
- Letters from the Earth to the Earth – 1968
- Poems Worth Knowing – 1971
- Intense Pleasure – 1972
- The Ova Yogas – 1972
- The Poet's Progress – 1977
- The Saladmaker – 1977
- I Don't Know – 1978
- A Knight in Dried Plums – 1978
- On the Road Again – 1978
- A New Romance – 1979
- My Body Was Eaten By Dogs – 1981
- Country of the Open Heart – 1982
- Three Stories and Ten Poems – 1982
- A Pair of Baby Lambs – 1983
- The Art of Darkness – 1984 (nominated for a Governor General's Award)
- Gypsy Guitar – 1987 (nominated for a Governor General's Award)
- Anonymity Suite – 1992
- There'll Be Another – 1995
- Five Star Planet – 2002
- Why Are You So Sad? Selected Poems of David W. McFadden – 2007 (shortlisted for the 2008 Canadian Griffin Poetry Prize)
- Be Calm, Honey – 2008 (shortlisted for the 2009 Governor General's Award in Poetry)
- Why Are You So Long & Sweet? Collected Long Poems of David W. McFadden – 2009
- What's the Score? – 2012 (winner of the 2013 Canadian Griffin Poetry Prize)

=== Fiction ===
- The Great Canadian Sonnet – 1974
- Animal Spirits – 1983
- Canadian Sunset – 1986

=== Travel ===
- A Trip Around Lake Huron – 1980
- A Trip Around Lake Erie – 1980
- A Trip Around Lake Ontario – 1988
- An Innocent in Ireland – 1995
- Great Lakes Suite – 1997
- An Innocent in Scotland – 1999
- An Innocent in Newfoundland – 2003
- An Innocent in Cuba – 2003
