= Weyman Chan =

Canadian poet

Weyman Chan (born 1963 in Calgary, Alberta) is a Canadian poet. He is most noted for his 2008 collection Noise from the Laundry, which was a shortlisted finalist for the Governor General's Award for English-language poetry at the 2008 Governor General's Awards.

His other poetry collections include Before a Blue Sky Moon (2002), Hypoderm: Notes to Myself (2010), Chinese Blue (2012) and Human Tissue: A Primer of Not Knowing (2016).

Chan was the 2021 recipient of the Latner Writers' Trust Poetry Prize.
