= Marek Kazmierski =

Polish and English writer, editor and translator (born 1973)

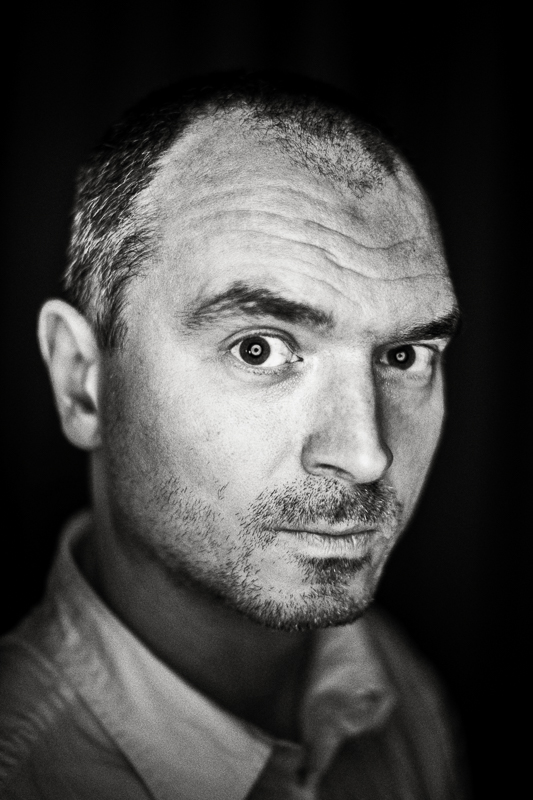
- Born: 1973; Warsaw, Poland
- Occupations: Writer, translator, editor

Marek Kazmierski (born 1973) is a writer, editor and translator, specializing in literary translations from Polish into English.

== Biography ==
In 1985 Kazmierski escaped communist Poland as a child and settled in the UK. Joint winner of the Decibel Penguin Prize and sole recipient of the BIKE Magazine Philosopher of the Year award. Kazmierski was also the managing editor of the prison literary magazine Not Shut Up, a member of the English PEN Readers & Writers committee and founded of OFF PRESS, an independent publishing house which has worked with the British Council, English PEN, the Southbank Centre, the Polish Cultural Institute and the Mayor of London.

His work has been published in numerous journals, including The White Review, The Guardian, 3AM Magazine and Poetry Wales.

Kazmierski is also a recipient of the Visegrad Literary Grant residency at Villa Decius in Kraków, Poland, courtesy of The Polish Book Institute, and coordinated the Polish Arts Festival in Essex and was involved in developing the academic research project eMigrating Landscapes at the SSEES, University College London.

In 2016, Kazmierski became a trustee to The Griffin Trust For Excellence In Poetry.

== Prose ==
- Damn the Source, London 2013 ISBN 9780957232730
- Allteria, London 2014 ISBN 9780957232754
- Teatr W Budowie, Boleslaw Stelmach, translation by Marek Kazmierski, Lublin 2016 ISBN 978-83-65028-22-8
- Inni Ludzie, Dorota Maslowska, translation by Marek Kazmierski, Warsaw Teatr Rozmaitosci 2019 ISBN 978-83-080-6510-5
- Blinded By the Lights, Jakub Żulczyk, translation by Marek Kazmierski, London 2020 ISBN 9781789559859
- Blinded By the Lights, Jakub Żulczyk, audiobook recording in English, Michigan, USA 2020 ISBN 1690598352
- Children’s Sexual Development, Karolina Piotrowska, translation by Marek Kazmierski, Gdansk / Natuli 2021 ISBN 978-83-66057-30-2
- BROK, Muzeum Powstania Warszawskiego, translation by Marek Kazmierski, Warsaw 2022 ISBN 978-83-64308-26-0
- Mitrys Trilogy, Pawel Kopijer, translation by Marek Kazmierski, Panko 2023 ISBN 9788396703507
- Niusia from Schindler’s list. A story of salvation, Magda Huzarska-Szumiec, ebook translation by Marek Kazmierski, Warsaw 2024 ISBN 978-83-8360-064-2
- Niusia from Schindler’s list. A story of salvation, Magda Huzarska-Szumiec, audiobook recording in English by Marek Kazmierski, Warsaw 2024 ISBN 9788383601328

== Poetry ==
Translated from Polish into English

- Erna Rosenstein, ONCE UPON A TIME, New York, 2021 ISBN 9783906915418
- Adam Mickiewicz, BAJKI / FABLES, London, 2019 ISBN 9780957232792
- Julian Tuwim, Children's Poems/Wiersze Dla Dzieci, Warsaw, 2018 ISBN 9788393259311
- Irit Amiel, Spóźniona/Delayed, Kraków, 2016 ISBN 978-83-7866-030-9
- Anthology of Polish Women Poets, Scattering the Dark, New York, 2016 ISBN 9781935210825
- Wioletta Grzegorzewska, Wioletta Greg, Finite Formulae and Theories of Chance, Arc Publications 2014 ISBN 978-1908376-91-6 (shortlisted for the 2015 Griffin Poetry Prize, selected for European Literature Night at the British Library, 2015)
- Genowefa Jakubowska-Fijałkowska, Of me a worm and of the worm verses, London 2012 ISBN 9780957232709
- Joanna Lech, Nothing of This ISBN 9780956394675
- Free Over Blood. Contemporary Polish poetry in translation, London 2011 ISBN 9780956394620
- Wioletta Grzegorzewska, Smenas Memory, London 2011 ISBN 9780956394682
- Grzegorz Kwiatkowski, Should not have born (ISBN 9780956394668)
- Jakobe Mansztajn, Vienna High Live ISBN 9780956394651)

== Awards ==
- Shortlisted for the 2015 Griffin Poetry Prize (translator)
- Selected for European Literature Night at the British Library (translator)
- Twice nominated for the Found in Translation Award
- Joint winner of the Penguin Decibel Prize
