= Karen Solie =

Canadian poet (born 1966)

- Born: 1966 (age 59–60); Moose Jaw, Saskatchewan, Canada
- Education: University of Lethbridge; University of Victoria
- Occupations: Poet, educator
- Writing career
- Notable awards: T. S. Eliot Prize (2025); Governor General's Award for English-language poetry (2025); Latner Griffin Writers' Trust Poetry Prize (2015); Pat Lowther Award (2010)

Karen Solie (born 1966) is a Canadian poet based in Toronto, Ontario and St Andrews, Scotland where she teaches at the University of St Andrews. Her sixth poetry collection, Wellwater, won the 2025 T. S. Eliot Prize,, the 2025 Forward Prize for Best Collection, the 2025 Governor General's Award for English-language poetry, and was shortlisted the PEN Heaney Prize.

== Early life ==
Born in Moose Jaw in 1966, Solie grew up on the family farm in southwest Saskatchewan. She holds a bachelors from the University of Lethbridge, Alberta, and pursued graduate studies at the University of Victoria, British Columbia. Over the years, she has worked as a farm hand, an espresso jerk, a groundskeeper, a newspaper reporter/photographer, an academic research assistant, and an English teacher.

== Career ==
Karen Solie's poetry, fiction and non-fiction have appeared in numerous North American journals, including Geist, The Fiddlehead, The Malahat Review, Event, Indiana Review, Arc Poetry Magazine, Other Voices, and The Capilano Review. She has also had her poetry published in the anthologies Breathing Fire (1995), Hammer and Tongs (1999), Introductions: Poets Present Poets (2001), Open Field: 30 Contemporary Canadian Poets (2005). One of her short stories was featured in The Journey Prize Anthology 12 (2000). Solie's poem "Prayers for the Sick" won second place in Arc Poetry Magazine's 2008 Poem of the Year Contest.

Solie was one of the judges for the 2007 Griffin Poetry Prize, judged the 2012 Walrus Poetry Prize, and was a judge for the Poetry in Voice Canadian high school poetry recitation competition. In 2014, she was named as a trustee to the Griffin Trust for Excellence in Poetry.

Her collection The Road in Is Not the Same Road Out was published in 2015. In 2015, she won the Latner Griffin Writers' Trust Poetry Prize.

In 2021, she was the Jack McClelland Writer in Residence at the University of Toronto, and in 2022, was the Holloway Visiting Poet at the University of California at Berkeley. She is currently a lecturer in creative writing at the University of St Andrews. In 2023, she received a Guggenheim Fellowship in Poetry.

== Awards ==
- 2026 Windham–Campbell Literature Prize for Poetry
- 2025 Governor General's Award for English-language poetry for Wellwater
- 2025 Forward Prize for Best Collection for Wellwater
- 2025 PEN Heaney Prize (shortlisted) for Wellwater
- 2025 T. S. Eliot Prize for Wellwater
- 2023 Guggenheim Fellowship in Poetry
- 2015 Latner Griffin Writers' Trust Poetry Prize
- 2010 Canadian Griffin Poetry Prize for Pigeon
- 2010 Pat Lowther Award for Pigeon
- 2010 Trillium Book Award for Poetry for Pigeon
- 2008 Arc Poetry Magazine's Poem of the Year Contest (second place) for "Prayers for the Sick"
- 2006 Trillium Book Award for Poetry (shortlisted) for Modern and Normal
- 2006 ReLit Award (longlisted) for Modern and Normal
- 2002 Dorothy Livesay Poetry Prize for Short Haul Engine
- 2002 Canadian Griffin Poetry Prize (shortlisted) for Short Haul Engine
- 2002 Gerald Lampert Award (shortlisted) for Short Haul Engine
- 2002 ReLit Award (shortlisted) for Short Haul Engine

== Bibliography ==
- Short Haul Engine (2001)
- Modern and Normal (2005)
- Pigeon (2009)
- The Living Option (2013)
- The Road In Is Not the Same Road Out (2015)
- The Caiplie Caves (2019)
- A Sharing Economy, Granta #141: Special Canada, 2017, pp 114 – 115
- Wellwater (2025)
