= Ed Roberson =

American poet (born 1939)

- Born: 1939 (age 86–87); Pittsburgh, U.S.
- Education: University of Pittsburgh
- Writing career
- Genre: Poet
- Notable awards: PEN/Voelcker Award for Poetry

Ed Roberson (born December 26, 1939) is an American poet.

== Life ==
Roberson was born and raised in Pittsburgh and graduated from the University of Pittsburgh in 1970, and later completed graduate work at Goddard College. He then served as a faculty member in the Department of English at the University of Pittsburgh and at Rutgers University until 2002. He married Rhonda Wiles in May 1973 who graduated from Rutgers University Douglas College and Hofstra Law School in New York. They had a daughter in 1976.

Since 2007, he has been a visiting writer and artist in Residence at the Northwestern University. and has also taught at the University of Chicago and Columbia College.

His work appears in the literary magazine Callaloo. Roberson has written eleven books of poetry.

== Awards ==
- 2020 Jackson Poetry Prize from Poets & Writers
- 2017 Academy of American Poets Fellowship
- 2016 PEN/Voelcker Award for Poetry
- 2008 Shelley Memorial Award
- 1998 National Poetry Series, for Atmosphere Conditions chosen by Nathaniel Mackey
- Iowa Poetry Prize for Voices Cast Out to Talk Us In
- LA Times Book Award
- Stephen Henderson Critics Award for Achievement in Literature
- Lila Wallace-Reader's Digest Writers' Award
- Lenore Marshall Award finalist, Academy of American Poets’

== Works ==
=== Poetry ===
- Asked What has Changed. Wesleyan University Press. 2022. ISBN 978-0-8195-8010-8.
- "From: Picking Up the Tune, the Universe and Planets", Electronic Poetry Center
- "VI. Cape Journal: At Sand Pile", Electronic Poetry Center
- Closest Pronunciation: Poems. Northwestern University Press. January 31, 2013. ISBN 978-0-8101-2892-7.
- To See the Earth Before the End of the World. Wesleyan University Press. 2010. ISBN 978-0-8195-6950-9.
- City Eclogue. Atelos. 2006. ISBN 978-1-891190-23-0.
- Atmosphere conditions. Sun & Moon Press. 2000. ISBN 978-1-55713-392-2.
- Voices cast out to talk us in: poems. University of Iowa Press. 1995. ISBN 978-0-87745-510-3.
- Etai-eken. University of Pittsburgh Press. 1975. ISBN 978-0-8229-5263-3.
- When thy king is a boy: poems. University of Pittsburgh Press. 1970. ISBN 978-0-8229-5214-5.

=== Anthologies ===
- Melissa Tuckey, ed. (2018). Ghost Fishing: An Eco-Justice Poetry Anthology. University of Georgia Press. ISBN 978-0-8203-5315-9.
- Lyn Hejinian; David Lehman, eds. (2004). "Ideas Gray Suits Bowler Hats Baal". The Best American Poetry 2004. Simon and Schuster. ISBN 978-0-7432-5757-2.
- Leonard Schwartz; Joseph Donahue; Edward Halsey Foster, eds. (1996). Primary trouble: an anthology of contemporary American poetry. Talisman House. ISBN 978-1-883689-29-2.
