= Phil Hall (poet) =

Canadian poet (born 1953)

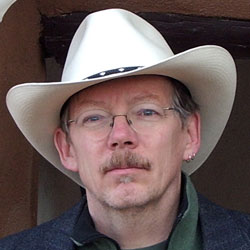
Phil Hall in New Mexico.

Phil Hall (born 1953 in Lindsay, Ontario) is a Canadian poet.

== Education ==
Hall holds a M.A. in creative writing from the University of Windsor.

== Career ==
Phil Hall started Flat Singles Press, producing broadsides & chapbooks, when he was an undergraduate studying drama and English at the University of Windsor. After graduating with an MA in 1978, he lived in Vancouver, where he was a member of the Vancouver Industrial Writers' Union and the Vancouver Men Against Rape Collective. In the late 80s he often wrote reviews of poetry and children's literature for Books In Canada, and was the Literary Editor for This Magazine. He also edited (with Andrew Vaisius) a short-lived journal called Don't Quit Yr Day-Job.

Hall has taught writing and literature at York University, Ryerson University (now Toronto Metropolitan University), George Brown College, Seneca College and Humber College. He has been writer-in-residence at the University of New Brunswick, the University of Ottawa, Queen's University, the University of Windsor, the University of Western Ontario, The Sage Hill Writing Experience, the Pierre Berton House, and the Banff Centre for the Arts.

“Anyword, A Festschrift for Phil Hall” was published in 2024 by Beautiful Outlaw Press. The 289 page tribute Hall’s work includes essays and appreciations from 26 contributors including Erin Moure, Don McKay, Fred Wah, George Bowering, Sandra Ridley, Louis Cabri and Ali Blythe.

Awards: In 2011, he won Canada's Governor General's Award for Poetry in English for his collection, Killdeer, a work the jury called "a masterly modulation of the elegiac through poetic time." Killdeer also won the 2012 Trillium Book Award, and was shortlisted for the 2012 Canadian Griffin Poetry Prize. That was his second Griffin nomination; in 2006 his book An Oak Hunch was also nominated. Trouble Sleeping, his 2000 collection, was nominated for a Governor General's Award.

Niagara & Government was shortlisted for the ReLit Award for poetry in 2021.

== Bibliography ==
- Eighteen Poems (Cyanamid, 1973)
- Homes (Black Moss, 1979)
- A Minor Operation (blewointment, 1983)
- Why I Haven't Written (Brick Books, 1985)
- Old Enemy Juice (Quarry Press, 1988)
- Amanuensis (Brick Books, 1989)
- The Unsaid (Brick Books, 1992)
- Hearthedral: A Folk-Hermetic (Brick Books, 1996)
- Trouble Sleeping (Brick Books, 2000) (shortlisted for the 2001 Governor General's Award)
- An Oak Hunch (Brick Books, 2005) (shortlisted for the 2006 Canadian Griffin Poetry Prize)
- White Porcupine (BookThug, 2007)
- The Little Seamstress (Pedlar Press, 2010)
- Killdeer (BookThug, 2011) (winner, 2011 Governor General's Award, Poetry; winner, 2012 Trillium Book Award; shortlisted for the 2012 Canadian Griffin Poetry Prize)
- Le pluvier kildir, translation by Rose Després.(Éditions Prise de parole, 2015)
- The Small Nouns Crying Faith (BookThug, 2013)
- Notes from Gethsemani (Nomados Press, 2014)
- Guthrie Clothing: The Poetry of Phil Hall (Wilfrid Laurier University Press, 2015)
- Conjugation (BookThug, 2016)
- Niagara & Government (Pedlar Press, 2020)
- Towards a Blacker Ardour (Beautiful Outlaw Press, 2021)
- "My Library as Theatre and Fortress” was published, online, by the Richler Library Project, in June 2021
- The Ash Bell (Beautiful Outlaw Press, 2022)
- ”Vallejo’s Marrow” (Beautiful Outlaw Press, 2024)
