= Pura López Colomé =

Mexican poet and translator

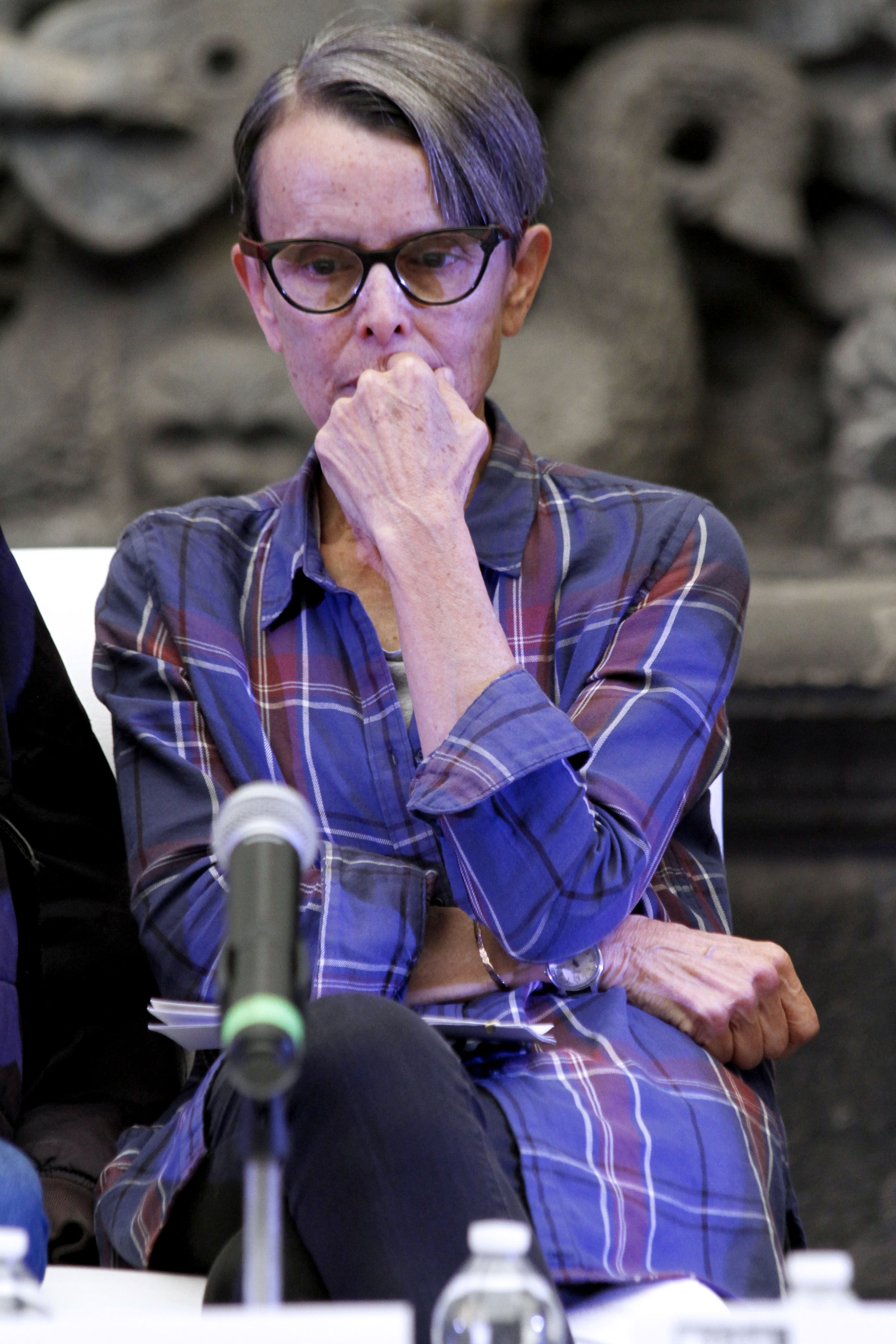
Pura López Colomé (2018)

Pura López Colomé (born November 6, 1952) is a Mexican poet and translator. She has contributed to various magazines and cultural supplements with poetry, essays, and translations of poetry and prose from English into Spanish. Her awards include the Alfonso Reyes National Essay Award, the National Poetry Translation Prize, and the Xavier Villaurrutia Prize.

== Biography ==
Pura López Colomé was born on November 6, 1952, in Mexico City. Most of her childhood was lived between Mexico City and Mérida, Yucatán, where her family is from. At the age of twelve, after the loss of her mother, she was sent to a Catholic boarding school run by Benedictine nuns located in South Dakota, United States. The boarding school had a library which offered a large selection of literature. Thanks to the nun who taught her English class, Lopez Colome became interested in poetry, mainly Irish works, but also poetry in general. In boarding school, she wrote her first poems and translated Emily Dickinson, W. B. Yeats, and Patrick Kavanagh.

López Colomé worked for a time as a language teacher at Berlitz. She then returned to Mexico, where she studied for a bachelor's degree in Hispanic and Hispanic-American literature at the National Autonomous University of Mexico (UNAM). She also served as secretary of the editorial staff of the Saturday supplement of the Unomásuno newspaper for several years, under the direction of Huberto Batis. Teachers like Huberto Batis, Antonio Alatorre, Salvador Elizondo, César Rodríguez Chicharro, and Ernesto Mejía Sánchez, motivated her not to change direction. She later took courses corresponding to master's and doctorate degrees, then left academia to dedicate herself totally to writing poetry and essays, and translating poetry. López Colomé is a member of the National System of Art Creators.

She married the Mexican biochemist, professor, academic and researcher, Alberto Darszon Israel.

== Awards and honours ==
In 1977, she received the Alfonso Reyes National Essay Award for Diálogo socrático en Alfonso Reyes. In 1992, she won the National Poetry Translation Prize for Isla de las estaciones, by Seamus Heaney. In 2007, she shared the Xavier Villaurrutia Prize with Elsa Cross, for Santo y sig.

== Selected works ==
- El sueño del cazador (México: Cuarto Menguante, 1985.)
- Un cristal en otro (México: Ediciones Toledo, 1990.)
- Aurora (México: Ediciones del Equilibrista, 1994.)
- Intemperie (San Luis Potosí: Ediciones Sin Nombre, 1997.)
- Santo y Seña (México: Fondo de Cultura Económica, 2007.)
- Reliquia (México: Consejo Nacional para la Cultura y las Artes / Ediciones Sin Nombre, 2008.)
- Por si acaso no (México: Parentalia ediciones (Fervores), 2010.)
- Poemas reunidos. 1985-2012(México: Consejo Nacional para la Cultura y las Artes (Práctica Mortal), 2013.)
