= Scott Griffin =

Canadian businessman and philanthropist

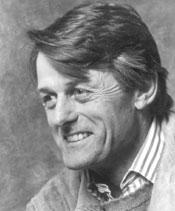
Scott Griffin is founder of the Griffin Poetry Prize, an award for poetry.

Scott Griffin, OC (born 1938) is a Canadian businessman and philanthropist best known for founding the Griffin Poetry Prize in 2000, one of the world's largest poetry awards, and Poetry In Voice, a bilingual recitation competition for Canadian high schools. Griffin has been interviewed on CBC Radio, discussing the genesis of his love for poetry, reading from his favourite works and paying tribute to poet Seamus Heaney, who received the Griffin Lifetime Recognition Award in 2012.

Griffin is chairman, director and majority shareholder since 2002 of publisher House of Anansi Press/Groundwood Books. He is also chairman and director of Steam Whistle Brewing, and a director of Literary Review of Canada.

He was formerly chairman of the Governors of Sedbergh School in Canada, a director of DGC Entertainment Ventures Corp and Chancellor of Bishop's University.

Griffin was previously chairman, director and majority shareholder of two Canadian manufacturing companies. General Kinetics Engineering Corporation (Brampton, Ontario, Canada) designs and manufactures components for military and other tracked vehicles and high-speed rail. Advance Precision Ltd. (Mississauga, Ontario, Canada) designed and manufactured parts for the automotive industry, and was acquired by a US manufacturing firm.

Griffin was on several NGO boards, as a director of Canadian Executive Services Overseas (CESO), a volunteer advisor to CESO and a director of African Medical and Research Foundation (AMREF) Canada and AMREF International.

In 2006, Griffin published a memoir entitled My Heart Is Africa that recounted his two-year aviation adventure starting in 1996, working for the Flying Doctors Service in Africa. All royalties from the sale of the book are donated to the AMREF Flying Doctors Service. The book was named to The Globe and Mail top 100 for 2006.

Griffin is married to jewellery designer Krystyne Griffin and has four children and eight grandchildren. He was appointed an officer of the Order of Canada on December 30, 2012.

== Notes ==
Academic offices
Preceded by Alex K. Paterson	Chancellor of Bishop's University; 2005-2013	Succeeded by Brian M. Levitt
