= Franz Wright =

American poet

Franz Wright (March 18, 1953 – May 14, 2015) was an American poet. He and his father James Wright are the only parent/child pair to have won the Pulitzer Prize in the same category.

== Life and career ==
Wright was born in Vienna, Austria. He graduated from Oberlin College in 1977.

Wheeling Motel (Knopf, 2009) had selections put to music for the record Readings from Wheeling Motel. Wright wrote the lyrics to and performs the Clem Snide song "Encounter at 3AM" on the album Hungry Bird (2009). Wright's most recent books include Kindertotenwald (Knopf, 2011), a collection of 65 prose poems concluding with a love poem to his wife, written while Wright had terminal lung cancer. The poem won Poetry magazine's premier annual literary prize for best work published in the magazine during 2011. The prose poem collection was followed in 2012 by Buson: Haiku, a collection of translations of 30 haiku by the Japanese poet Yosa Buson, published in a limited edition of a few hundred copies by Tavern Books.

In 2013, Wright's primary publisher, Knopf in New York, brought out another full-length collection of verse and prose poems, F, which was begun in the ICU of a Boston hospital after excision of part of a lung. F was the most positively received of any of Wright's work. Writing in the Huffington Post, Anis Shivani placed it among the best books of poetry yet produced by an American, and called Wright "our greatest contemporary poet."

In 2013, Wright recorded 15 prose poems from Kindertotenwald for inclusion in a series of improvisational concerts performed in European venues, arranged by David Sylvian, Stephan Mathieu and Christian Fennesz.

Wright has been anthologized in works such as The Best of the Best American Poetry as well as Czeslaw Milosz's anthology A Book of Luminous Things Bearing the Mystery: Twenty Years of Image, and American Alphabets: 25 Contemporary Poets.

=== Death ===
Wright died of lung cancer at his home in Waltham, Massachusetts on May 14, 2015.

== Reception ==
Writing in the New York Review of Books, Helen Vendler said "Wright's scale of experience, like Berryman's, runs from the homicidal to the ecstatic... [His poems'] best forms of originality [are] deftness in patterning, startling metaphors, starkness of speech, compression of both pain and joy, and a stoic self-possession with the agonies and penalties of existence." Novelist Denis Johnson has said Wright's poems "are like tiny jewels shaped by blunt, ruined fingers--miraculous gifts." The Boston Review has called Wright's poetry "among the most honest, haunting, and human being written today." Poet and critic Ernest Hilbert wrote for Random House's magazine Bold Type that "Wright oscillates between direct and evasive dictions, between the barroom floor and the arts club podium, from aphoristic aside to icily poetic abstraction." Walking to Martha's Vineyard (2003) in particular, was well received. According to Publishers Weekly, the collection features "[h]eartfelt but often cryptic poems...fans will find Wright's self-diagnostics moving throughout." The New York Times noted that Wright promises, and can deliver, great depths of feeling, while observing that Wright depends very much on our sense of his tone, and on our belief not just that he means what he says but that he has said something new...[on this score] Walking to Martha's Vineyard sometimes succeeds."

Poet Jordan Davis, writing for The Constant Critic, suggested that Wright's collection was so accomplished it would have to be kept "out of the reach of impulse kleptomaniacs." Added Davis, "deader than deadpan, any particular Wright poem may not seem like much, until, that is, you read a few of them. Once the context kicks in, you may find yourself trying to track down every word he's written."

Some critics were less welcoming. According to The New Criterion critic William Logan, with whom Wright would later publicly feud, "[t]his poet is surprisingly vague about the specifics of his torment (most of his poems are shouts and curses in the dark). He was cruelly affected by the divorce of his parents, though perhaps after forty years there should be a statute of limitation... 'The Only Animal,' the most accomplished poem in the book, collapses into the same kitschy sanctimoniousness that puts nodding Jesus dolls on car dashboards." "Wright offers the crude, unprocessed sewage of suffering", he comments. "He has drunk harder and drugged harder than any dozen poets in our health-conscious age, and paid the penalty in hospitals and mental wards."

The critical reception of Wright's 2011 collection, Kindertotenwald (Knopf), has been positive on the whole. Writing in the Washington Independent Book Review, Grace Cavalieri speaks of the book as a departure from Wright's best known poems. "The prose poems are intriguing thought patterns that show poetry as mental process... This is original material, and if a great poet cannot continue to be original, then he is really not all that great... In this text there is a joyfulness that energizes and makes us feel the writing as a purposeful surge. It is a life force. This is a good indicator of literary art... Memory and the past, mortality, longing, childhood, time, space, geography and loneliness, are all the poet's playthings. In these conversations with himself, Franz Wright shows how the mind works with his feelings and his brain's agility in its struggle with the heart."

Cultural critic for the Chicago Tribune Julia Keller says that Kindertotenwald is "ultimately about joy and grace and the possibility of redemption, about coming out whole on the other side of emotional catastrophe." "This collection, like all of Wright's book, combines familiar, colloquial phrases--the daily lingo you hear everywhere--with the sudden sharpness of a phrase you've never heard anywhere, but that sounds just as familiar, just as inevitable. These pieces are written in closely packed prose, like miniature short stories, but they have a fierce lilting beauty that marks them as poetry. Reading 'Kindertotenwald' is like walking through a plate-glass window on purpose. There is--predictably--pain, but once you've made it a few steps past the threshold, you realize it wasn't glass after all, only air, and that the shattering sound you heard was your own heart breaking. Healing, though, is possible. "Soon, soon," the poet writes in "Nude With Handgun and Rosary," "between one instant and the next, you will be well."

== Awards ==
- 1985, 1992 National Endowment for the Arts grant
- 1989 Guggenheim Fellowship
- 1991 Whiting Award
- 1996 PEN/Voelcker Award for Poetry
- 2004 Pulitzer Prize for Poetry, for Walking to Martha's Vineyard

== Selected works ==
- The Toy Throne, Tungsten Press (2015)
- The Writing, Argos Books, 2015, ISBN 978-1-938247-09-5
- The Raising of Lazarus, Tungsten Press (2014)
- F, Knopf, 2013 ISBN 978-0-307-70158-9
- Kindertotenwald Alfred A. Knopf, 2011, ISBN 978-0-307-27280-5
- "7 Prose", Marick Press, 2010, ISBN 978-1934851-17-3
- Wheeling Motel Alfred A. Knopf, 2009, ISBN 9780307265685
- Earlier Poems, Random House, Inc., 2007, ISBN 978-0-307-26566-1
- God's Silence, Knopf, 2006, ISBN 978-1-4000-4351-4
- Walking to Martha's Vineyard Alfred A. Knopf, 2003, ISBN 978-0-375-41518-0
- The Beforelife A.A. Knopf, 2001, ISBN 978-0-375-41154-0
- Knell Short Line Editions, 1999
- ILL LIT: Selected & New Poems Oberlin College Press, 1998, ISBN 978-0-932440-83-9
- Rorschach test, Carnegie Mellon University Press, 1995, ISBN 978-0-88748-209-0
- The Night World and the Word Night Carnegie Mellon University Press, 1993, ISBN 978-0-88748-154-3
- Entry in an Unknown Hand Carnegie Mellon University Press, 1989, ISBN 978-0-88748-078-2
- Going North in Winter Gray House Press, 1986
- The One Whose Eyes Open When You Close Your Eyes Pym-Randall Press, 1982, ISBN 978-0-913219-35-5
- 8 Poems (1982)
- The Earth Without You Cleveland State University Poetry Center, 1980, ISBN 9780914946236
- Tapping the White Cane of Solitude (1976)

=== Translations ===
- The Unknown Rilke: Selected Poems, Rainer Maria Rilke, Translator Franz Wright, Oberlin College Press, 1990, ISBN 978-0-932440-56-3
- Valzhyna Mort: Factory of Tears (Copper Canyon Press, 2008) (translated from the Belarusian language in collaboration with the author and Elizabeth Oehlkers Wright)
