= Pedlar Press =

Canadian publisher

Pedlar Press is an independent Canadian book publisher based in St. John's NL, specializing in contemporary works of poetry, prose and graphic novels, works that extend the tradition of literary experimentation.

Pedlar Press was founded in 1996 by publisher Beth Follett. The house publishes seven books each year. When Follett published her own debut novel ("Tell it Slant", 2001) with Coach House Books; it was reviewed as characterizing "the kind she publishes herself."

Pedlar's authors include poets Souvankham Thammavongsa, Joel Thomas Hynes, Phil Hall (poet) and Brian Henderson; graphic novelists Lorenz Peter and Fiona Smyth; and novelists Martha Baillie, Ken Sparling and Camilla Gibb, who published her debut novel with Pedlar. The books have won numerous awards for literary quality. Examples include Camilla Gibb's 2000 Toronto Book Award for her debut novel Mouthing the Words, Souvankham Thammavongsa's Small Arguments, which won the 2004 ReLit Award for Poetry and her more recent collection, Light, which won the 2014 Trillium Award for Poetry, and Kate Cayley's short fiction collection, How You Were Born, which won the 2015 Trillium Book Award. In 2010, Ronna Bloom's collection Permiso was shortlisted for the Pat Lowther Memorial Award and Barry Dempster was nominated for the Ontario Premier's Award for Excellence in the Arts.

Layout, typography and design have been recognized with a total of ten citations (1998–2007) for the Alcuin Society Book Design Awards.

Pedlar Press ceased operations at the end of 2020. Founder Beth Follett attributed the closure to financial constraints due to the Covid 19 pandemic.
