= Book*hug =

Book*hug Press, formerly BookThug, is a literary press in Toronto, Canada, founded in 2003, which originally concentrated on experimental poetry and currently publishes contemporary books of literary fiction, literary nonfiction, literature in translation, and poetry by emerging and established writers. Jay MillAr is the founder and current co-publisher along with Hazel Millar.

The company has published award-winning books of Canadian poetry, including Phil Hall's Killdeer, which won the Governor General's Award for English-language poetry in 2011.

In 2018, their name was changed to "Book*hug Press" due to the controversial nature of the word "thug" and "a question about cultural appropriation".

== Notable people ==
- Jenny Sampirisi, former Managing Editor
