= The Battlefield Where The Moon Says I Love You =

Epic poem by Frank Stanford

- Author: Frank Stanford
- Language: English
- Genre: Epic poetry, southern gothic
- Publisher: Mill Mountain Press & Lost Roads
- Publication date: 1978
- Pages: 542 pp (1st), 383 pp (2nd)
- ISBN: 0-918786-13-4
- OCLC: 3121031
- Dewey Decimal: 811/.5/4
- LC Class: PS3569.T3316 B3
- Preceded by: Constant Stranger (1976)
- Followed by: Crib Death (1978)

The Battlefield Where The Moon Says I Love You is a 15,283-line epic poem by the poet Frank Stanford. First published in 1978 as a 542-page book, the poem is visually characterized by its absence of stanzas (or any skipped horizontal spaces) and punctuation.

Stanford worked on the manuscript for many years (beginning either as a teenager in the 1960s, or even before his teenage years) prior to its publication—a joint-publication by Mill Mountain Press (Stanford's publisher throughout the early and mid-1970s) and Lost Roads (Stanford's own press)—in 1978. Though the copyright was registered in 1977, the volume was not released until after Stanford's death, as C. D. Wright notes in her introduction to the 2000 re-release. After being out of print for several years, the book was republished by Lost Roads (under succeeding editorship of C.D. Wright and Forrest Gander) in 2000; this second, corrected edition—383 pages, equipped with line numbers—is in print, having been reprinted by the press in 2008. A common misconception is that the 15,283-line poem (as evident in the 2000 edition) was actually over 21,000 lines in the first edition (which suggests that the two texts are actually different), but the seemingly longer line count in the 1978 edition is merely resultant of the paper's octavo size, effecting many lengthy lines to be necessarily broken with indents employed.
