= Transient Worlds =

2026 anthology by Arthur Sze

Transient Worlds: On Translating Poetry
- Author: Arthur Sze
- Genre: Poetry, literary criticism
- Publisher: Copper Canyon Press
- Publication date: April 14, 2026
- Pages: 160
- ISBN: 978-1-55659-732-9

Transient Worlds: On Translating Poetry is a 2026 anthology by Arthur Sze, published by Copper Canyon Press in association with the Library of Congress.

== Background ==
The book is Sze's laureate project in collaboration with the Library of Congress as the twenty-fifth Poet Laureate of the United States. He was inspired to compile it after he taught a class at the Institute of American Indian Arts called "The Poetic Image" where he taught Indigenous students about Chinese poems.

It collects nearly two millennia of poetry from around the world translated into English from thirteen languages including Arabic, Greek, Japanese, Navajo, Spanish, and Tzeltal, among others. In addition to many languages, the book considers fifteen "zones" of literary discourse and artistry.

== Critical reception ==
The Pittsburgh Post-Gazette lauded Sze's mission with the book, writing that "dismantling walls and cultural barriers will help to find the common ground that seems to be shifting and eroding underfoot" and that "translation builds bridges and makes connections."

On the Seawall praised the book's ambitious and far-reaching scope across history and geography, concluding that Sze is seeking to change the lives of his readers "one poetry translation at a time."
