= Archipelago (book) =

Poetry collection by Arthur Sze

- Author: Arthur Sze
- Genre: Poetry
- Publisher: Copper Canyon Press
- Publication date: June 1, 1995
- Pages: 85
- ISBN: 978-1-55659-100-6

Archipelago is a 1995 poetry collection by Arthur Sze, published by Copper Canyon Press, and the 1996 winner of the American Book Award for Poetry. It draws upon Buddhist and Native American art and culture, specifically inspired by the Zen garden at Ryōan-ji.

== Critical reception ==
Publishers Weekly wrote that Sze's poems "inhabit the space between declaration and question," finding that his strategy of ending "a declarative sentence with a question mark" establishes "the territory in between the observer's consciousness" and the world.

The Portlandia Review of Books called the poems "a chain of poetic islands in a wide expanse of water, each island richly inhabited by ideas and images springing from his culture," praising how Sze "balances the intuitive and the intellectual to reach his readers on two fronts."

Western American Literature stated that "Sze’s poems unfold with an unparalleled richness of imagery and a force that doesn’t proceed from any single device, logical or poetic" and called him "Perhaps our finest American translator of Chinese poems."

Mānoa called Sze's poems "embodiments of the mind opening out and taking in, through splendid language, the flora and fauna, the common and uncommon objects with which it comes into contact. These poems show a remarkable ability to seize on nature and human undertakings without cataloging them."
