= Compass Rose (poetry collection) =

2014 poetry collection by Arthur Sze

- Author: Arthur Sze
- Publisher: Copper Canyon Press
- Publication date: July 1, 2014
- Pages: 68
- ISBN: 978-1556594670
- Preceded by: The Ginkgo Light
- Followed by: Sight Lines

Compass Rose is a 2014 poetry collection by American poet Arthur Sze. Similar to his previous works, the book features poetry that observe natural, scientific phenomena, as well as history and the passage of time. His tenth collection, it was a finalist for the 2015 Pulitzer Prize for Poetry.

== Critical reception ==
Publishers Weekly noted Sze's "contemplative, image-based poetics" and "his commitment to recognizing the activity of the world around him".

Rain Taxi wrote that "These poems vibrate in the hidden, interstitial spaces between open and closed, literal and figurative, science and art, the land and its maps, the compass and the rose." Poetica, a journal at the University of New Mexico, stated that Sze "is as fluid with watering horses as drinking with quantum physicists, as literate in ancient Chinese poetry as with contemporary poetics".

In The New York Times, David Orr included the book on his 10 Favorite Poetry books of 2014 list, calling it "a subtle, patient, many-layered examination of consciousness".
