= Ashwini Bhat =

Indian-American sculptor

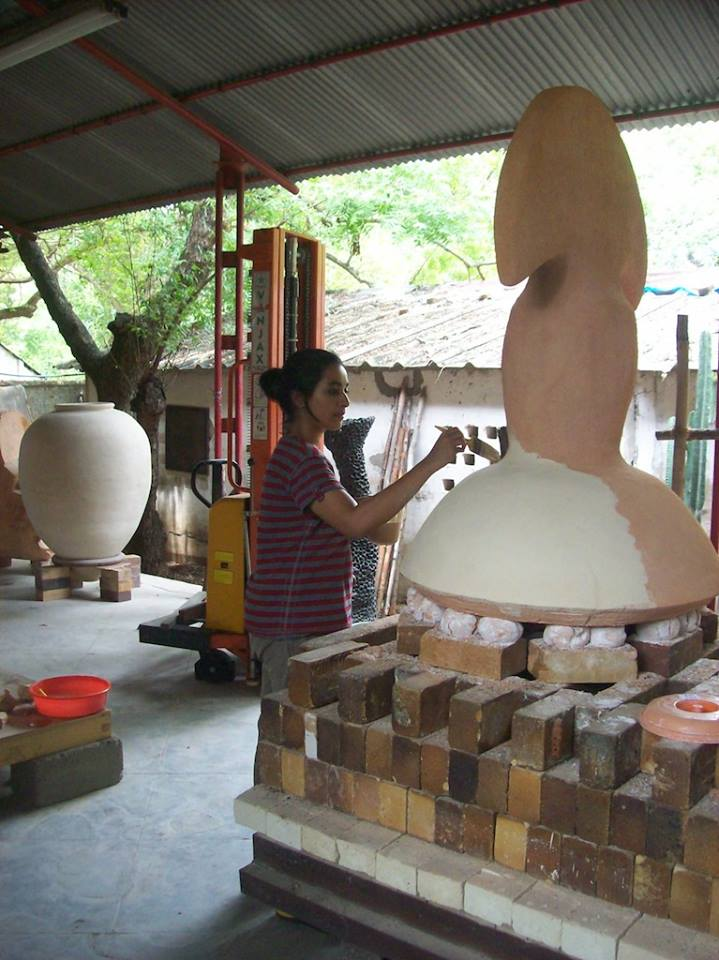
- Born: Puttur, India
- Awards: United States Artists Fellowship and The Howard Foundation Fellowship for Sculpture
- Website: ashwinibhat.com

Ashwini Bhat is an artist, based in California. Bhat uses sculptures, installations, video, and text, to develop a unique visual language exploring the intersections between body and nature, self and other. Her work draws inspiration from her home in the foothills of Sonoma Mountains, California as well as her rural agrarian community upbringing in Southern India. Her work focuses on California’s ecology in this time of climate change and shifting habitats.

== Biography ==
Born in Puttur, Karnataka, India Ashwini Bhat has a master's degree in literature from Bangalore University. She studied classical dance (Bharatanatyam) for seventeen years and traveled internationally as a professional dancer in the Padmini Chettur Dance Company before beginning a career as a visual artist. Coming from dance to sculpture, Bhat sees a close relationship between her own body and the sculptural body she creates.

Since 2015, she has lived in the USA. Bhat lives in a small unincorporated town in Northern California with poet, writer Forrest Gander.

In 2023, Bhat became a certified Naturalist at the Fairfield Osborn Preserve, a research site for Sonoma State University’s Center for Environmental Inquiry. She is represented by Shoshana Wayne Gallery, Los Angeles, USA, and Project 88, Mumbai, India.

== Awards ==
- USA Fellowship
- The Howard Foundation Fellowship for Sculpture (2013–14)
- McKnight Artist Residency Fellowship

== Selected Exhibitions ==
- “Her Nature,” Project 88, Mumbai, India
- “Bay Area Now 9,” Yerba Buena Center for the Arts, San Francisco, CA, USA
- “In Your Arms I’m Radiant,” Shoshana Wayne Gallery, Los Angeles, CA, USA
- “Imprinted,” American Museum of Ceramic Art, Pomona, CA, USA
- “Ritual Encounters,” a collaborative installation, Mondavi Center for the Performing Arts UC Davis, CA, USA
- “Earth Took of Earth,” Newport Art Museum, Newport, RI, USA
