= Quipu (book) =

Poetry collection by Arthur Sze

- Author: Arthur Sze
- Genre: Poetry
- Publisher: Copper Canyon Press
- Publication date: September 1, 2005
- Pages: 88
- ISBN: 978-1-55659-226-3

Quipu is a 2005 poetry collection by Arthur Sze, published by Copper Canyon Press.

== Title ==
The title refers to the quipu, an Incan device made of knotted cords used for record-keeping. In Centrum, Sze described his interest in how quipus "might encode language" and said he sought to harness "dyed strings of language along with forms of knotting" in his poems.

== Critical reception ==
Publishers Weekly wrote that Sze "weaves together details from nature, questions from philosophy, and discoveries from modern physics, collecting facts with a Thoreau-like patience," stating that the poems create "a poetry of simultaneity, and a contemplative mindset."

The Boston Review described the book as a "shifting, shimmering fabric of images and instances, a vibrant homage to what [Wallace] Stevens called 'the intricacies of appearance.'"

Sink Review praised Sze's observational powers but lamented that the book's "happy moments, sad moments, harsh moments, erotic moments, historical, scientific and philosophical observations all begin to point in the same direction over and over."

Writing for the International Poetry Festival of Medellín, a critic called the collection an example of "string theory" vis-à-vis Sze's method of knotting disparate materials together through the quipu metaphor.
