= Frank Stanford =

American poet

- Born: Francis Gildart Smith; August 1, 1948; Richton, Mississippi, U.S.
- Died: June 3, 1978 (aged 29); Fayetteville, Arkansas, U.S.
- Occupation: Poet
- Notable work: The Battlefield Where The Moon Says I Love You (1977)

Frank Stanford (born Francis Gildart Smith; August 1, 1948 – June 3, 1978) was an American poet. He is most known for his epic, The Battlefield Where The Moon Says I Love You – a labyrinthine poem without stanzas or punctuation. In addition, Stanford published six shorter books of poetry throughout his twenties, and three posthumous collections of his writings (as well as a book of selected poems) have also been published.

== Biography ==
=== Early life and education ===
Frank Stanford was born Francis Gildart Smith on August 1, 1948, to widow Dorothy Margaret Smith at the Emery Memorial Home in Richton, Mississippi. He was soon adopted by a single divorcee named Dorothy Gilbert Alter (1911–2000), who was Firestone's first female manager. In 1952, Gilbert married successful Memphis levee engineer Albert Franklin Stanford (1884–1963), who subsequently also adopted "Frankie" and his younger, adoptive sister, "Ruthie" (Bettina Ruth). Stanford attended Sherwood Elementary School and Sherwood Junior High School in Memphis until 1961 when the family moved to Mountain Home, Arkansas, following A. F. Stanford's retirement; Stanford finished junior high school in Mountain Home. The elder Stanford died after the poet's freshman year at Mountain Home High School.

In 1964, as a junior, Stanford entered Subiaco Academy near Paris, Arkansas, in the Ouachita Mountains. He entered the University of Arkansas in Fayetteville where he started to write poetry, and soon became known throughout the Fayetteville literary community, and published poetry in the student literary magazine, Preview. However, he left the university, never earning a degree.

=== Career ===
==== 1969–1972 ====
Over the next several years, Stanford kept writing and in 1971 married Linda Mencin. During this time, Stanford probably worked on The Battlefield Where The Moon Says I Love You — which he had likely begun as a teenager.

In June 1970, he met Irving Broughton, the editor and publisher of Mill Mountain Press, at the Hollins Conference on Creative Writing and Cinema. Broughton read Stanford's work at the conference and agreed to publish the poet's first book, The Singing Knives. Five of Stanford's poems appeared in The Mill Mountain Review later that year, and in 1971, The Singing Knives was published as a limited edition chapbook. That summer, Stanford and Mencin married, but, after having lived together for two years, Mencin left the poet after only three months of marriage.

Stanford spent much of 1972 traveling through the South and New England with Broughton, a communications teacher and filmmaker, and these interviews were published in The Writer's Mind: Interviews With American Authors, a three-volume set. Stanford briefly lived in New York City, but only, he would later write, "to go to the movies." Returning to Arkansas from New York, he moved to the old spa town of Eureka Springs and took a room in the New Orleans Hotel.

==== 1973–1976 ====
For several years, beginning as early as 1970, Stanford meagerly supported himself (and his second wife) by working as an unlicensed land surveyor. The profession permeated his poetry in numerous instances, as in the poem "Lament Of The Land Surveyor". Broughton and Stanford made a 25-minute documentary about Stanford's work and life — filmed in Arkansas, Mississippi and Missouri, discussing the land surveyor's experiences, and interviewing friends on whom Stanford's literary characters were sometimes based — titled, It Wasn't A Dream, It Was A Flood, which won one of the Judge's Awards at the 1974 Northwest Film & Video Festival.

Following the publication of The Singing Knives, Broughton's Mill Mountain Press published five more of Stanford's chapbook-length manuscripts between 1974 and 1976. Ladies From Hell appeared in 1974, followed by Field Talk, Shade, and Arkansas Bench Stone in 1975; all four books included drawings by Ginny Stanford. Constant Stranger, were released the following year.

Returning to Fayetteville in 1975, Stanford reestablished relationships with local area writers and met poet C. D. Wright, a graduate student in the Master of Fine Arts program at the University of Arkansas. The two poets began an affair which would last the rest of Stanford's life. In 1976, Stanford rented a house in Fayetteville on Jackson Drive with Wright and established the independent publishing operation Lost Roads Publishers to publish the work of talented poets without ready access to publishing; he said that his purpose with the press was to "reclaim the landscape of American poetry." That fall, the Stanfords moved from Beaver Lake to the Crouch family's farm in southwest Missouri.

==== 1977–1978 ====
In 1977, Stanford's Fayetteville, Arkansas based Lost Roads Publishing Company released its first title, Wright's Room Rented By A Single Woman, and more titles soon followed. The press would issue twelve books under Stanford's direction. Early in the year, in an article on Arkansas arts in The New York Times, Stanford's teacher, Jim Whitehead, referred to Stanford as "the most exciting young Arkansas poet he knows."

===== The Battlefield Where The Moon Says I Love You =====
The year 1977 also saw the publication of Stanford's most substantial and influential book, The Battlefield Where The Moon Says I Love You. A joint publication by Mill Mountain Press and Lost Roads (taking up numbers 7–12 in the Lost Roads catalogue), the published version of the epic (which had, at one point, according to Stanford, reached over 1,000 pages and 40,000 lines) settled at 542 pages (383 pages in the second, 2000, edition) In an April 1974 letter, Stanford comments that poet Alan Dugan had written to him with the response, "This is better than good, it is great ... one day it will explode."

==== Final months and days ====
By 1978, Stanford was heavily occupied with Lost Roads' publishing endeavors. Father Nicholas Fuhrmann, Stanford's former English teacher and longtime friend, has noted that Stanford was, during this period, visiting his mother (who lived in Subiaco) more often than had seemed usual.

=== Death ===
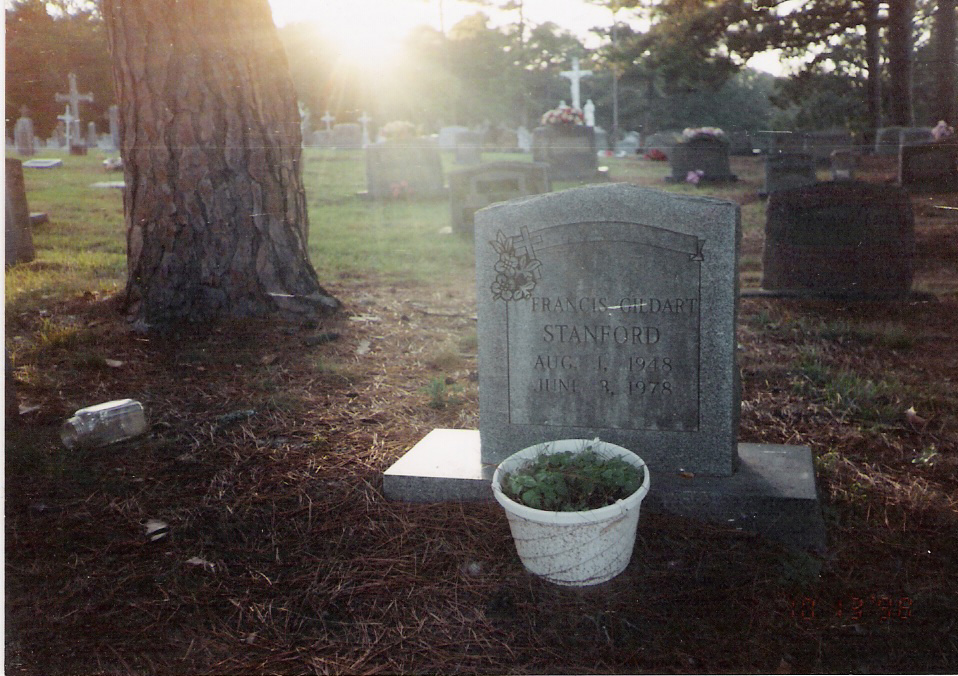
Stanford's grave at St. Benedict's Cemetery in Subiaco, Arkansas

On the Saturday evening of June 3, 1978, Stanford committed suicide in his home in Fayetteville. In her essay, "Death In The Cool Evening," widow Ginny Stanford notes that, having discovered her husband's infidelity, they argued about the matter; subsequently, Stanford retreated to his bedroom, and moments later, gunshots were heard: on the morning of June 5, Deputy Coroner Hugh Huppert ruled the death a suicide, declaring that Stanford had thrice shot himself in the heart with a .22-caliber target pistol. Both Ginny Stanford and C. D. Wright were in the house at the time of his death. Stanford's funeral was held on June 6. He was buried in St. Benedict's Cemetery at Subiaco beneath a stand of yellow pines, five miles (eight km) from the Arkansas River.

Father Fuhrmann, who had met with Stanford shortly before his death, feels that the poet had "a lot on his mind," and Wright and Ginny Stanford reported that he was depressed and withdrawn on the day of his suicide. Stanford had also spent time at the Arkansas State Hospital (the state psychiatric hospital) in Little Rock, Arkansas in 1972 and may have had prior suicide attempts.

== Legacy ==
Frank Stanford's legacy is one shrouded in numerous inaccuracies. A 2002 misprint in Poets & Writers credits Stanford, not Irving Broughton, as the founder of Mill Mountain Press. Stanford's own books have printed biographical and bibliographical errors; for instance, the biographical note for the posthumously published book, Crib Death, states that Stanford was "born in 1949 in Greenville, Mississippi," when in fact he was born in 1948 in Richton, Mississippi, some 240 miles (390 km) away, and the table of contents for The Light The Dead See: Selected Poems of Frank Stanford lists The Singing Knives as having been published in 1972 and Crib Death as having been published in 1979, when in fact they were published in 1971 and 1978, respectively.

In 2008 Ben Ehrenreich published an essay on Stanford on Poetry magazine's website which was reposted in 2015 on the occasion of the publication of What About This: Collected Poems of Frank Stanford.

In 2016, klipschutz (pen name of Kurt Lipschutz) published an extensive essay-review in Toad Suck Review (Univ. of Arkansas), covering both the Collected and its companion volume Hidden Water: From the Frank Stanford Archives (Third Man Press). The essay-review was reprinted in 2022 in Best of the Sucks (MadHat Press).

=== Posthumous works ===
Ironwood Press published Stanford's chapbook, Crib Death, in 1978, shortly after his death. Lost Roads, editorship succeeded by C. D. Wright, published a posthumous chapbook of yet more of Stanford's poems, titled You (as well as a limited edition reprint of The Singing Knives), in 1979. In 1990, the press released a collection of Stanford's short fiction, titled Conditions Uncertain And Likely To Pass Away. A slim volume of selected poems, The Light The Dead See: Selected Poems of Frank Stanford, was published the following year by the University of Arkansas Press. Furthermore, much of Stanford's work is as yet unpublished, including the manuscripts: Flour The Dead Man Brings To The Wedding and The Last Panther In The Ozarks (which combine to make one manuscript), and Automatic Co-Pilot.

Stanford's work was published by Mill Mountain, Ironwood, and Lost Roads mostly as limited edition chapbooks. In October 2000, Lost Roads republished The Battlefield Where The Moon Says I Love You. In February 2008, Lost Roads reissued The Singing Knives and You. 2015 saw the publication of two collections, What About This: Collected Poems of Frank Stanford from Copper Canyon Press and Hidden Water: From the Frank Stanford Archives.

=== Reception ===
==== Cultural response ====
In the 1990s, Ginny Stanford and C. D. Wright published accounts of their respective relationships to Stanford, both during his life and afterward. Ginny Stanford published two essays: "Requiem: A Fragment," in The New Orleans Review in 1994, and its companion piece of sorts, "Death In The Cool Evening," a Frank Stanford feature in The Portable Plateau in 1997. Photos of Frank Stanford by the widow accompanied her essays in both publications. Also in 1997, Conjunctions published C. D. Wright's essay, "Frank Stanford, Of The Mulberry Family: An Arkansas Epilogue."

Stanford has also been written about in at least two novels — Steve Stern's The Moon & Ruben Shein and Forrest Gander's As A Friend — and two folk songs — the Indigo Girls' "Three Hits" and Lucinda Williams' "Pineola;" the former is an ode to Stanford's work while the latter is a eulogy of sorts for Stanford, who was a family friend of the Williamses.

Stanford's impact on poetry was profound and lasting, and celebrations of his work frequently take place. All-night readings of The Battlefield Where The Moon Says I Love You have also occasionally occurred, such as one organized by Brown University students in 1990 and another at New York's Bowery Poetry Club in April 2003. A July 1997 tribute to Stanford in Fayetteville featured readings of Stanford's poetry and a screening of It Wasn't A Dream, It Was A Flood.

==== Critical response ====
Despite continued interest in Stanford's work, his legacy has been largely overlooked in the canonization process of poetry anthologies and university literature courses. He is one of the least known of the significant voices of latter 20th century American poetry, despite being widely published in many prominent magazines, including The American Poetry Review, Chicago Review, FIELD, The Iowa Review, Ironwood, kayak, The Massachusetts Review, The Mill Mountain Review, The Nation, New American Review, The New York Quarterly, Poetry Now, Buenos Aires Poetry, and Prairie Schooner.

However, Stanford's work has received significant critical praise. Alan Dugan called Stanford "a brilliant poet, ample in his work," comparing him to Walt Whitman. Poet Franz Wright called him "one of the great voices of death." Poet Lorenzo Thomas called him "amazing ... a swamprat Rimbaud, poet James Wright referred to him as a "superbly accomplished and moving poet," and poet Richard Eberhart praised the "strange grace of language in the poet's remarkable, unforgettable body of work." Leon Stokesbury introduces The Light The Dead See by claiming that Stanford was, "at the time of his death, the best poet in America under the age of thirty-five." Other contemporaries remarked his "perfectly tuned" ears, the "remarkable acuity" of his "clear-cut imagery and spring-tight lines," and his "remarkable talent" as a "testimony to [his] place in American letters."

In his introduction to What about This: Collected Poems of Frank Stanford (Copper Canyon Press, 2015), the poet Dean Young described Stanford's poetry as, "something authentically raw, even brutal, which seems both very old and utterly new, its vitality coming from roots that sink deep into the primitive well-springs of art and the mud of the human heart and mind." In a 2015 review for The New York Times, Dwight Garner says "Since Mr. Stanford's death, his cult has grown, but it's never come close to metastasizing. In large part, that's because his work has been hard to find, issued by tiny presses and often out of print. The long-awaited publication this month of What About This: The Collected Poems of Frank Stanford gives us a chance to see him whole. It introduces to a broader audience an important and original American poet."

== Publications ==
- The Singing Knives (Mill Mountain, 1971; Lost Roads, 1979, 2008)
- Ladies From Hell (Mill Mountain, 1974)
- Shade (Mill Mountain, 1975)
- Field Talk (Mill Mountain, 1975)
- Arkansas Bench Stone (Mill Mountain, 1975)
- Constant Stranger (Mill Mountain, 1976)
- The Battlefield Where The Moon Says I Love You (Mill Mountain/Lost Roads, 1977; Lost Roads, 2000)
- Crib Death (Ironwood, 1978)
- You (Lost Roads, 1979, 2008)
- Conditions Uncertain And Likely To Pass Away (Lost Roads, 1990)
- The Light The Dead See: Selected Poems of Frank Stanford (University of Arkansas, 1991)
- What About This: The Collected Poems of Frank Stanford (Copper Canyon, April 14, 2015)
- Hidden Water: From The Frank Stanford Archives (Third Man, July 21, 2015)
