= Gōzō Yoshimasu =

Japanese poet, photographer, artist and filmmaker

Gōzō Yoshimasu (吉増 剛造|Yoshimasu Gōzō) (born 1939, Tokyo) is a prolific Japanese poet, photographer, artist and filmmaker active since the 1960s. He has received a number of literary and cultural awards, including the Takami Jun Prize (1971), the Rekitei Prize, the Purple Ribbon Medal in 2003 (given by the Government of Japan), the 50th Mainichi Art Award for Poetry (2009), and the Order of the Rising Sun, Gold Rays in 2013.

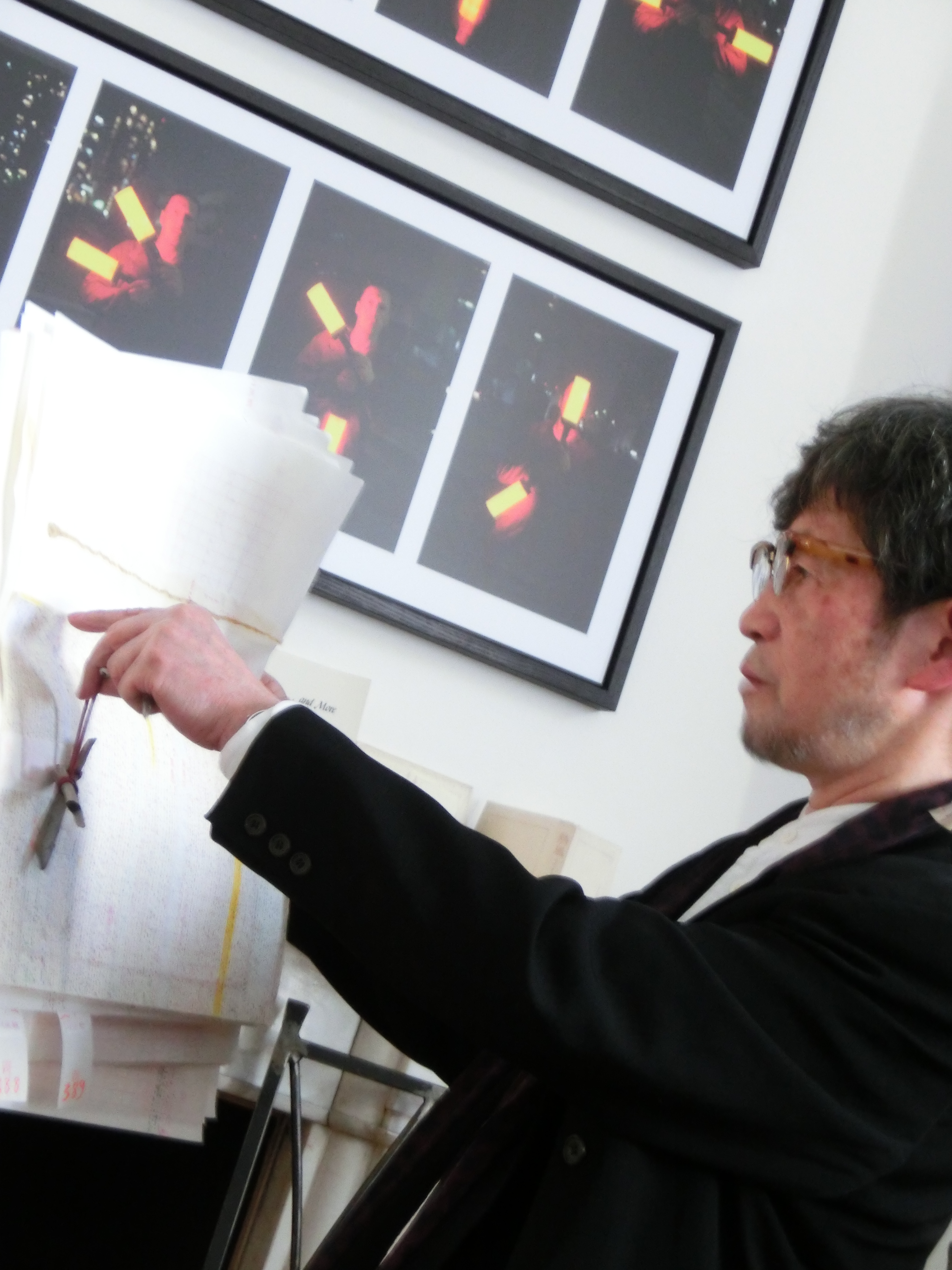
Reading at the Daiwa Foundation (London), 5 July 2013

Major influences include Shinobu Orikuchi, Paul Klee, Vincent van Gogh, Paul Cézanne, William Blake, John Cage, Patrick Chamoiseau. Many of his poems are multilingual, blending elements of French, English, Chinese, Korean, Gaelic, and more, and feature cross-linguistic and typographic wordplay. His poems rely on intimate experiences with geography and history, layering encounters in the present with a keen awareness of the past. Drawing on multiple translators whose detailed notes appear opposite the translations, helping to elucidate them, Alice Iris Red Horse: Selected Poems of Yoshimasu Gozo, a Book in and on Translation is the most extensive and adventurous attempt at an English translation of Yoshimasu's complex poetry. Yoshimasu's performances often include film, the display of fetish objects, chanting, ritual procedures, and the collaboration of musicians and other artists.

In a 2014 interview by Aki Onda on the MoMA blog "Post," Yoshimasu described the relationship of his poetry to performance by remarking, "My quest is to reclaim the poetry that lies at the root of performing arts."

His visual art has been gaining increased recognition, with the Japan Art Academy awarding him the Imperial Prize and the Japan Art Academy Prize in 2015.

== Publications ==
=== Poetry anthologies ===
- Departure (出発, Shin-geijutsusha, 1964)
- Anthology of Golden Age Poetry (黄金詩篇, Shichōsha, 1970)
- Tower of the Mind (頭脳の塔, Aochisha, 1971)
- Kingdom (王國, Kawade Shobō Shinsha, 1973)
- Exorcising My Demons (わが悪魔祓い, Seidosha, 1974)
- River Written in Cursive (草書で書かれた、川, Shichōsha, 1977)
- Hot Wind: a thousand steps (熱風 a thousand steps, Chuō Kōronsha, 1979)
- Blue Sky (青空, Kawade Shobō Shinsha, 1979)
- Letter to the Tree Towering next to the Big Hospital (大病院脇に聳えたつ一本の巨樹への手紙, Chuō Kōronsha, 1983)
- Osiris, God of Stone (オシリス、石ノ神, Shichōsha, 1984)
- Helix Songs (螺旋歌, Kawade Shobō Shinsha, 1990)
- At the Entrance to the House of Fireworks (花火の家の入口で, Seidosha, 1995)
- “The Island of Snow,” or “The Ghost of Emily” (「雪の島」あるいは「エミリーの幽霊」, Shūeisha, 1998)
- The Other Voice (Shichōsha, 2002)
- Extended Poem: Goro-Goro (長篇詩 ごろごろ, Mainichi Shimbunsha, 2004)
- Snake of Heaven, Bloom of Violet (天上ノ蛇、紫のハナ, Shūeisha, 2005)
- Nowhere Tree (何処にもない木, Shironsha, 2006)
- Naked Memo (裸のメモ, Shoshi Yamada, 2011)
- Dear Monster (怪物君, Misuzu Shobō, 2016)
- Voix (Shichōsha, 2021)

=== Exclusive anthologies ===
A number of major poetry publishers in Japan have published books and issues of journals (such as Gendai-shi Techō) anthologizing Yoshimasu's works. These include:

- Yoshimasu Gōzō Anthology (吉増剛造詩集, Shichōsha, gendaishi bunko, 1971)(ISBN 4783707405)
- Yoshimasu Gōzō Anthology 1-5 (吉増剛造詩集 1-5, Kawade Shobō Shinsha, 1977–78)
- August Sunset, Unicorn (八月の夕暮、一角獣よ, Chūsekisha, 1992)
- 『続・吉増剛造詩集』(Shichōsha, gendaishi bunko, 1994) (ISBN 4783708827)
- 『続続・吉増剛造詩集』(Shichōsha, gendaishi bunko, 1994) (ISBN 4783708835)
- 『吉増剛造詩集』(Kadokawa Haruki Jimusho, Haruki bunko, 1999) (ISBN 4894565706)

=== Others ===
- Morning Letters (朝の手紙, (Ozawa Shoten, 1974)
- I Am a Flaming Mirage (わたしは燃えたつ蜃気楼, Ozawa Shoten, 1976)
- River of the Sun (太陽の川, Ozawa Shoten, 1978)
- A Quiet Place (静かな場所, Shoshi Yamada, 1981)
- Imagine a Helix (螺旋形を想像せよ, Ozawa Shoten, 1981)
- The Tram that Flew to the Sky (そらをとんだちんちんでんしゃ. Photography by Horiguchi Akira, Shōgakukan, 1982)
- Green City, Bright Silver (緑の都市、かがやく銀, Ozawa Shoten, 1986)
- Time Goes Trembling On (打ち震えていく時間, Shichōsha, 1987)
- Tōkoku Notes (透谷ノート, Ozawa Shoten, 1987)
- Scotland Travels (スコットランド紀行, Shoshi Yamada, 1989)
- Death’s Ship (死の舟, Shoshi Yamada, 1992)
- The Homelands of Words (ことばのふるさと, Yatate Shuppan, 1992)
- A Lifetime’s Path through Dreams: Walking with Orikuchi Shinobu (生涯は夢の中径 - 折口信夫と歩行, Shichōsha, 1999)
- Hometown of Words, Hometown Fussa (ことばの古里、ふるさと福生, Yatate Shuppan, 2000)
- The Flaming Movie House (燃えあがる映画小屋, Seidosha,2001)
- The Bared Wildflower: From Poetry to the World (剥きだしの野の花 - 詩から世界へ, Iwanami Shoten, 2001)
- Brazil Diaries (ブラジル日記, Shoshi Yamada, 2002)
- Put a Poem in Your Pocket: Journey to My Beloved Poets (詩をポケットに - 愛する詩人たちへの旅, NHK Publishing, 2003)
- In Between 11: Yoshimasu Gōzō’s Ireland (In between 11 吉増剛造 アイルランド, EU・JapanFest, Japan Committee, 2005)
- 表紙 omote‐gami (Shichōsha, 2008)
- gozoCiné KI-SE-KI (キセキ-gozoCiné, Osiris, 2009) (ISBN 4990123964)
- Quiet America (静かなアメリカ, Shoshi Yamada, 2009)
- Garden of Gold Gone Blind (盲いた黄金の庭, Iwanami Shoten, 2010) (Photography collection.)
- Mokpo Correspondence (木浦通信, Yatate Shuppan, 2010)
- Poetics Lecture: Infinite Echoes (詩学講義 無限のエコー, Keiō University Press, 2012)
- Poetic Autobiography: Grab the Flame with Bare Hands! (我が詩的自伝 素手で焔をつかみとれ！, Kōdansha, 2016)
- Like Tattooing My Heart (心に刺青をするように, Fujiwara Shoten, 2016)
- Gozo Notes, 1-3 (GOZOノート 1–3, Keiō University Press, 2016)
- Ecriture of the Moment (瞬間のエクリチュール, edition.nord, 2016)
- La Broderie de feu: Gozo Yoshimasu, 2008-2017 (火ノ刺繍 吉増剛造 2008-2017, Kyōbunsha, 2018)

=== Co-authored works ===
- Bones of the Tree with Kido Shuri (木の骨, Yatate Shuppan, 1993)
- Sea of Melted Snow: Tampopo and Tampupu (はるみずのうみ - たんぽぽとたんぷぷ, Yatate Shuppan, 1999) (ISBN 4946350527)
- Dolce/Sweetly: A New Encounter with Image and Word (ドルチェ-優しく―映像と言語、新たな出会い, with Aleksandr Nikolayevich Sokurov, Shimao Miho. Iwanami Shoten, 2001) (ISBN 4000241192)
- Words that Quake to the Loom (機―ともに震える言葉, with Ryoko Sekiguchi, Shoshi Yamada, 2006) (ISBN 4879956805)
- Across the Naked Common: Japanese and American Poets' Response to Emerson with Forrest Gander and Masaki Horiuchi (裸のcommonを横切って―エマソンへの日米の詩人の応答, Takanashi Shobō, 2019)

=== Interviews/Dialogues ===
Yoshimasu has often had dialogues with creators from Japan and around the world. These include:

- Ocean in a Boardgame, Cosmos in a Poem (盤上の海、詩の宇宙, Kawade Shobō Shinsha, 1997) Conversations with Yoshiharu Habu (ISBN 4309263194)
- At the Edge of this Era (この時代の縁で, with Hiromasa Ichimura, Heibonsha, 1998) (ISBN 4582829236)
- On the Shores of "Asia" (「アジア」の渚で, (Fujiwara Shoten, 2005) Dialogue with / co-authored by Korean poet Ko Un (ISBN 4894344521)
- To the World as Archipelago (アーキペラゴ - 群島としての世界へ, Iwanami Shoten, 2006) Dialogue / epistolary exchange with Ryūta Imafuku, Professor of Anthropology and Communication at Tokyo University of Foreign Studies (ISBN 4000220314)

== Translations into French ==
- Osiris: dieu de pierre. Tr. Claude Mouchard and Makiko Ueda. Circé, May 1999.
- Antique observatoire, translated by Claude Mouchard and Masatsugu Ono, illustrations by Daniel Pommereulle, Collection R / Avant post, 2001.
- The Other Voice, translated by Ryoko Sekiguchi, preface by Michel Deguy Éditions Caedere 2002.
- Ex-Voto, a thousand steps and more, translated by Ryoko Sekiguchi, Éditions Les petits matins October 2009.

== Translations into English ==
- Devil’s Wind: A Thousand Steps or More. Ed./trans. Brenda Barrows, Thomas Fitzsimmons. Oakland University Press, 1980.
- Osiris: The God of Stone. Tr. Hiroaki Satō. St. Andrew's Press, 1989.
- "at the side (côtés) of poetry." Tr. Jeffrey Angles. Guernica, 5 Nov. 2012.
- "火・Fire: To Adonis...". Tr. Jordan A. Yamaji Smith. Poetry Review, Vol. 103. No. 2 (Summer 2013), pp. 60–61.
- ed. Forrest Gander. Alice, Iris, Red Horse: Selected Poems of Gozo Yoshimasu: a Book in and on Translation. Translated by Hiroaki Sato, Jeffrey Angles, Sawako Nakayasu, Jordan A. Yamaji Smith, Richard Arno, Auston Stewart, Eric Selland, Sayuri Okamoto & Derek Gromadzki. New Directions, 2016.
