= The Glass Constellation: New and Collected Poems =

Poetry collection by Arthur Sze

- Author: Arthur Sze
- Genre: Poetry
- Publisher: Copper Canyon Press
- Publication date: March 2, 2021
- Pages: 560
- ISBN: 978-1-55659-621-6

The Glass Constellation: New and Collected Poems is a 2021 poetry collection by Arthur Sze, published by Copper Canyon Press. The book gathers from ten previous collections by Sze, spanning five decades of existing poems alongside twenty-six new ones.

== Title ==
In an interview on Milkweed Editions' Between the Covers podcast, Sze said the collection's title was a reference to Indra's net, describing how "all the poems are like these pieces of glass, reflecting and absorbing the light of every other."

== Critical reception ==
The Glass Constellation received the 2024 National Book Foundation Science + Literature Prize and the 2024 Rebekah Johnson Bobbitt National Prize for Poetry from the Library of Congress. It was named one of the best books of 2021 by The Boston Globe.

Library Journal gave it a starred review, calling it "a monumental collection from a poet whose lasting importance should now be recognized" and deeming it "essential for dedicated readers of contemporary American poetry."

World Literature Today called it "a stellar collection of lyrical poems that captivate the reader's heart," concluding that "this is a volume I feel very fortunate to have encountered. I am living with it. You will want to as well."

The Georgia Review described it as "incandescent" and "an invitation for us all to see ourselves, our lives, this earth, and one another in clear, attuned radiance."

Terrain.org called Sze "simultaneously the microscope and telescope of the poetry world," praising his poetics as "a sublime and masterful embodiment of a kind of cosmic consciousness."

The Cortland Review wrote that Sze's "achievement is considerable" and similarly praised his poetics as "edifying in its freshness, confident in its approach, and winningly modest in its adjustment of the sublime."
