= Into the Hush =

Poetry collection by Arthur Sze

- Author: Arthur Sze
- Genre: Poetry
- Publisher: Copper Canyon Press
- Publication date: April 1, 2025
- Pages: 88
- ISBN: 978-1-55659-714-5

Into the Hush is a 2025 poetry collection by Arthur Sze, published by Copper Canyon Press. It is Sze's twelfth book of poetry and his first collection since The Glass Constellation in 2021.

== Form ==
The collection addresses a litany of issues including climate change, endangered languages, and the nuclear age through forms like haibun, ekphrasis, pantoum, and zuihitsu. On PBS NewsHour, Sze discussed the book's form with Jeffrey Brown, who noted that "the natural world and our place in it, human dramas, history" constitute recurring themes among the poems.

== Critical reception ==
Into the Hush was longlisted for the 2025 National Book Critics Circle Award in poetry and was a finalist for the 2026 PEN/Jean Stein Book Award.

Christopher Spaide, writing in Literary Hub, noted that Sze "is still checking off new forms (zuihitsu, haibun, pantoum), and still devising novel ways to compact global English to lyric proportions," calling the book a reminder that he "deserves the lifetime achievements he's been winning on a yearly basis."

Tricycle wrote that it "experiments with this dance between sound and silence in presenting a startling portrait of the nuclear age."

Poetry Northwest called it "observant and electric," praising how "a narrow field of poetry may offer a wider and deeper view."

The International Examiner wrote that "Sze conjures explosively vivid images that draw the reader into each poem" and that it "is packed with poems that unify the human form with nature."
