= Poet Laureate of Rhode Island =

The state poet of Rhode Island is the poet laureate for the U.S. state of Rhode Island. The program was established in 1987, is codified in Chapter 42-100 of the State of Rhode Island General Laws. The five-year appointment by the governor carries an annual salary of $1,000.

Carolyn D. Wright was poet laureate in 1994

== List of poets laureate ==
- Michael S. Harper (1988–1993)
- C.D. Wright (1994–1999)
- Tom Chandler (2000–2007)
- Lisa Starr (2007–2012)
- Rick Benjamin (2013–2016)
- Tina Cane (2016–2024)
- Colin Channer (2024–2029)

== See also ==
- Poet laureate
- List of U.S. state poets laureate
- United States Poet Laureate
