= Coral Bracho =

Mexican poet and translator

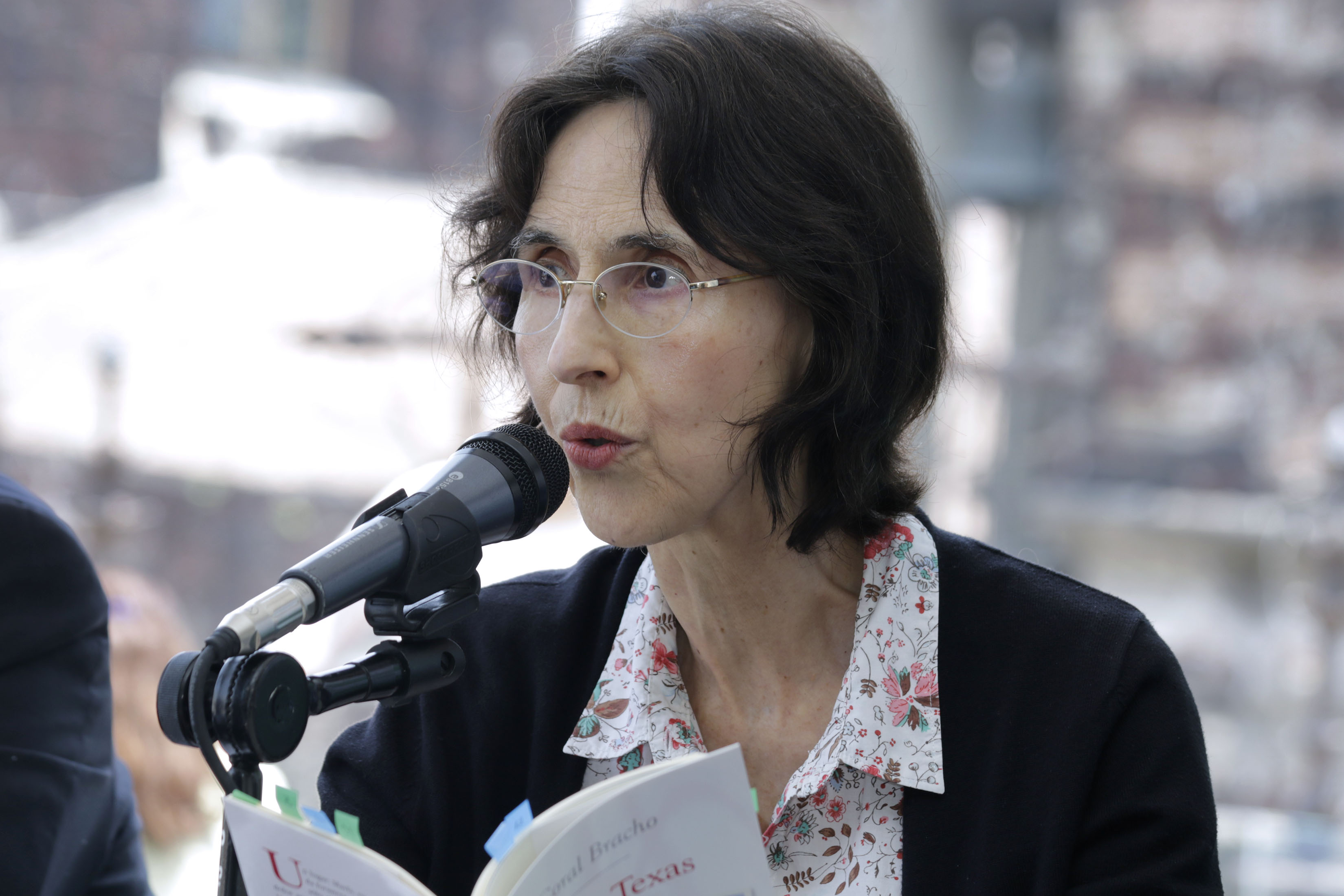
Coral Bracho in 2017.

Coral Bracho (born 1951 in Mexico City) is a Mexican poet, translator, and doctor of Literature.

Bracho is winner of the Aguascalientes National Poetry Prize in 1981 and a Guggenheim Fellowship in 2000. She received the 2004 Xavier Villaurrutia Award for her book, Ese Espacio, Ese Jardin. She is a member of the Sistema Nacional de Creadores de Arte (National Artists’ Center), and in 2007 she was awarded the award “Programa de Aliento a la Obra Literaria de la Fundación para las Letras Mexicanas” in recognition of her work.

== Works ==
Coral Bracho was born in Mexico City in 1951. She has published six books of poems: Peces de piel fugaz [Fish of Fleeting Skin] (1977), El ser que va a morir [The Being that is Going to Die] (1981), Tierra de entraña ardiente [Earth of Burning Entrails] (in collaboration with the painter Irma Palacios, 1992), La voluntad del ámbar [The Will of Amber] (1998), Ese espacio, ese jardín [That Space, That Garden] (2003), and Cuarto de hotel (2007). Her poems were translated for the Poetry Translation Centre's 2005 World Poets' Tour by Tom Boll and the poet Katherine Pierpoint. A selection from her first two collections was included in the definitive anthology of contemporary neo-baroque writing from Latin America, Medusario (1996), edited by Roberto Echavarren, José Koser and Jacobo Sefamí. Like many of the writers who operate in this line that runs from Luis de Góngora through José Lezama Lima, Bracho's early poems marry verbal luxuriance with a keen intelligence and awareness of artistic process. Yet that artistic consciousness doesn't lose sight of world. When she visited London in 2005 she described the way that her tour-de-force ‘Agua de bordes lúbricos' [Water of Jellyfish] operates: ‘It tries to get close to the movement of water' with images that are ‘fleeting'; ‘you can't grasp them, they are very fluid. What remains is that continuity of water.' The poems of La voluntad del ámbar introduce more autobiographical content. Both ‘Trazo del tiempo' [Marks of Time] and ‘Detrás de la cortina' [Behind the Curtain] recount direct memories of childhood. They also tend to rein in the long lines of the earlier collections, replacing fluid syntax with what Julio Trujillo has described as a versification that ‘no es, al cabo, una cuestión meramente rítmica sino casi silogística: el movimiento es conceptual, se pasa de una deducción a otra' [isn't, in the end, merely rhythmical but syllogistic; the movement is conceptual, it passes from one deduction to another]. That conceptual clarity is exercised further in Ese espacio, ese jardín, an extended meditation on the passage of time and the death at the heart of all life, which was awarded the Xavier Villaurrutia Prize in 2004. Coral Bracho is also a translator of poetry and has been a member of the Sistema Nacional de Creadores since 1994. New Directions, New York, has published two influential volumes of translations of Bracho's work, Firefly under the Tongue (2008) and It Must Be a Misunderstanding, both translated by poet Forrest Gander.

“These poems are incandescent, submerged, sensate, intelligent in the way the universe is intelligent, at once cosmic and intimate. Coral Bracho creates a space so charmed and charged I never wanted to leave it.”—Carole Maso

"Poetry may be the most immediately sensuous literary form, but its language tends to substitute for touch rather than enact it. To place the body in close relation with other bodies and objects involves an unsettling of the self within a larger passage from identities to intimacies. Coral Bracho stunned readers in Mexico by doing just this in her 1981 collection El ser que va a morir (Being toward Death), parts of which appear in Firefly Under the Tongue: Selected Poems of Coral Bracho, beautifully translated by Forrest Gander. In "Being toward Death," Bracho combines a quiet inwardness that is also a vulnerable openness: “(—Children trace their liquid howl on the bark, / as a vegetal ghost) // —The flames lick-out from the night, from its long roots. / —Its fluid / roundness, its coming to be / —From what I drink, what I touch.” In this poetic speaking, mouths and hands synonymously approach a densely textured materiality. Although Bracho frequently mentions death in her poems, nothing ever quite dies in them—rather, it takes on a different life and shape: “One blink is the dream, / another is death singing / with undisguised tenderness.” Bracho's frequent use of parentheses in earlier poems and broken narratives in later ones signal not so much interruptions as shifts. Similarly, her writing has moved over the course of nearly three decades from a spatially fluid tactility to a crystalline attention to objects in time. A poem from 1998's The Disposition of Amber reads in its entirety: “The posture of the trees, / as gesture, / is momental.” A later book, the long poem That Space, That Garden, synthesizes previous relational modes. As with other excerpts in the collection, one wishes there were more. Recent writing in Firefly under the Tongue limns experiences of bliss with a sense of mortality. But Bracho has always had the ability to make happiness seem slightly dangerous, as her poetry doesn't so much speak the unspeakable as voice its constant and quavering proximity." --Alan Gilbert, The Boston Review

=== Periodicals ===
Her poems have appeared in:

- The American Poetry Review
- BOMB
- Conjunctions
- The Nation
- The Paris Review
- Poetry International Web

=== Collections ===
Bracho has had several books published collecting her works

- Peces de piel fugaz (Fish of Fleeting Skin) (1977)
  - Reissued as Huellas de Luz ("Tracks of Light") (1994, 2006)
- El ser que va a morir [The Being that is Going to Die] (1982)
  - winner of El Premio Nacional de Poesia de Casa de la Cultura de Aguascalientes (Aguascalientes National Poetry Prize)
- Bajo el destello liguido (Beneath the Sparkling Liquid) (1988)
- Tierra de entraña ardiente (Earth's Smoldering Core) with the painter Irma Palacios (1992)
- La voluntad del ámbar (The Disposition of Amber) (1998)
- Of Their Eyes as Crystalline Sand, Duration Press (1999). Translated to English by poet Forrest Gander.
- Watersilks, Poetry Ireland (1999). Translated from English, French and Portuguese.
- Trait du Temps/Trazo del Tiempo (Brush Strokes of Time) (2001)
- Ese espacio, ese jardín (That Space, That Garden) (2003)
  - Winner of the Xavier Villaurrutia Award
- ¿A donde fue el Ciempies? (Where was the Centipede?), Illustrations by Rafael Parajas (2007). Poetry for children.
- Cuarto de hotel (2007)
- Firefly Under the Tongue (New Directions, 2008)

=== Anthologies ===
Bracho's poems are also included in several anthologies.

- Líneas Conectadas: nueva poesía de los Estados Unidos (Connecting Lines: New Poetry from Mexico), Sarabande Books (2006), eds. Luis Cortes Bargallo and Forrest Gander
- Reversible Monuments: An Anthology of Contemporary Mexican Poetry, Copper Canyon Press (2002)
- Medusario: Muestrade Poesia Latinoamericano/a, (A Sampling of Latin American Poetry), Fondo De Cultura Economico USA (1996), eds. Roberto Echaverren, Jose Kozer and Jacobo Safami
- Mouth to Mouth: Poems by Twelve Contemporary Mexican Women, Milkweed Editions (1993)
