= It Wasn't A Dream, It Was A Flood =

1974 film by Frank Stanford

- Directed by: Frank Stanford; Irving Broughton
- Starring: Frank Stanford
- Release date: 1974
- Running time: 25 minutes
- Country: United States

It Wasn't A Dream, It Was A Flood is a 1974 autobiographical, 16mm short film about poet Frank Stanford, made by Stanford and his publisher, Irv Broughton. Stanford appears charismatic and passionate in the 25-minute film, which interviews friends on whom Stanford's literary characters were sometimes based.

The film won one of the Judge's Awards at the 1975 Northwest Film & Video Festival. It has never been released in theaters or on home video.

The film was screened on July 26, 1997, at Vox Anima Artspace and October 18, 2008, at the Frank Stanford Literary Festival, both in Fayetteville, Arkansas.
