= Deborah Luster =

American artist

Deborah Luster (born 1951) is a photographic artist from Northwest Arkansas, and has been a professional photographer since the 1990s. Luster co-created One Big Self: Prisoners of Louisiana with C.D. Wright, and is known for using older technology such as tintype to document and artistically portray violent crime and related topics. Her work has been published and written about by The Economist, the John Simon Guggenheim Memorial Foundation, the Jack Shainman Gallery, and the San Francisco Museum of Modern Art.

== Career ==
Luster worked with poet C.D. Wright in Louisiana State Penitentiary for six years (1998–2003) on One Big Self, making portraits of prisoners in gelatin silver print. Luster produced more than 25,000 photographs using on older technology, particularly tintype, as part of the One Big Self project. Luster's work on One Big Self extended to two other prisons including Angola Penitentiary. Luster jointly won a Lange-Taylor Prize in 2000 with C.D. Wright for One Big Self.

In 1999, The Light Factory exhibited a mid-career retrospective of her work entitled Come Shining: The Spiritual South – Photographs by Deborah Luster.

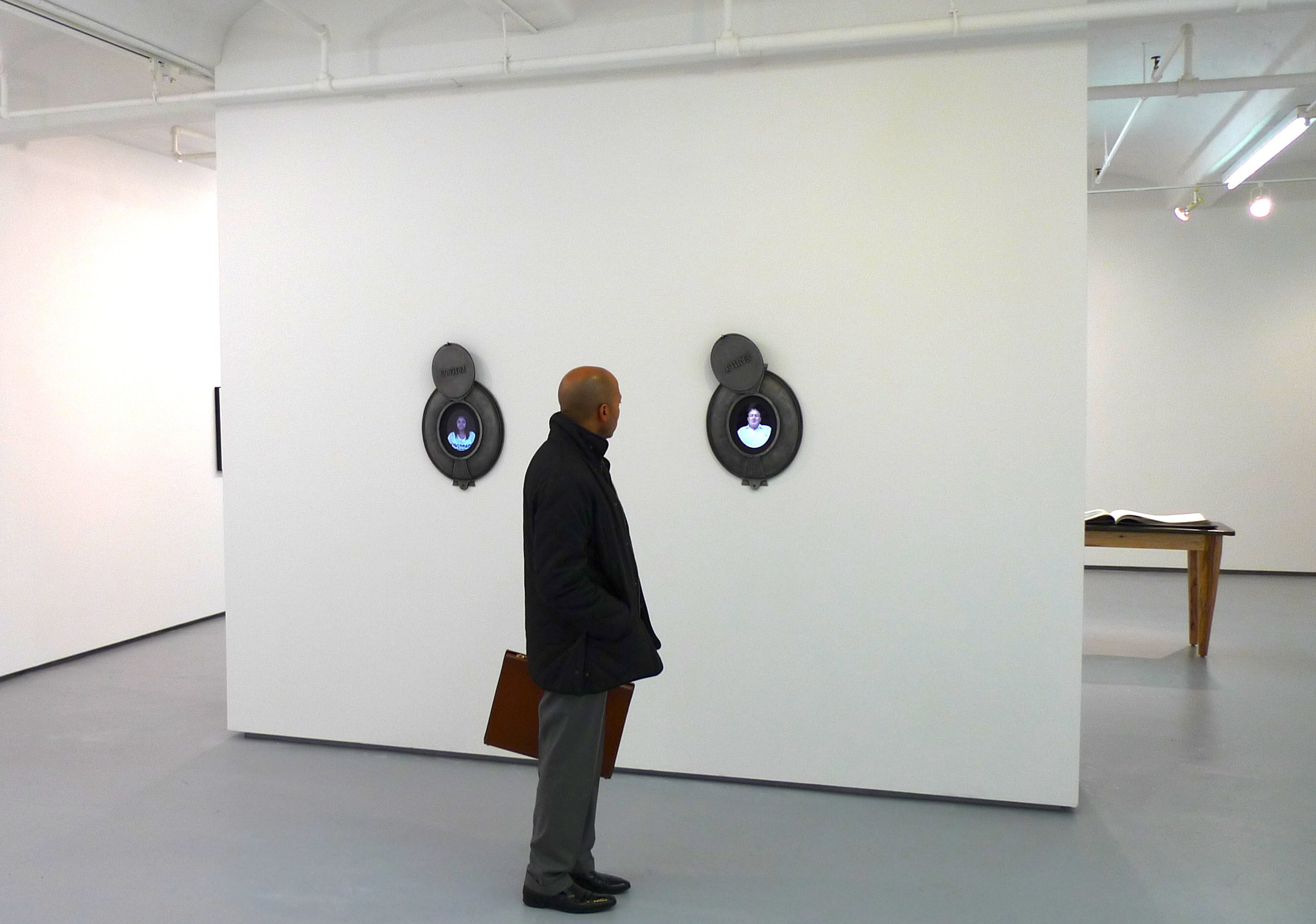
Part of a Tooth for an Eye display

Luster published a 64-page 17-inch hardcover book titled Tooth for an Eye: A Chorography of Violence in Orleans Parish in February 2011. This work focuses on the effect a high rate of homicide has in New Orleans, creating "a complex and vivid portrait of loss and remembrance." Some pieces include graffiti and poetry and were featured freely for several weeks as part of the Prospect.1 New Orleans city art event. Vince Aletti in The New Yorker said of the work: "Suddenly, we are there, and desolation, desperation and death are very real."

In earlier work, Luster photographed votive paintings of Mexico and people she connected with to create "saints", in conjunction with C.D. Wright for Rosesucker Retablos. The intention was to create "magical" portraits.

She won the Baum Award in 2001, the John Gutmann Photography Fellowship and Anonymous Was A Woman Award in 2002, a Peter S. Reed Foundation Grant in 2011, a Guggenheim Fellowship in 2013, and a Ford Foundation Art of Change fellowship in 2017.

She gave visiting presentations at the Pratt Institute, Hendrix College, and Watkins College of Art and Design in 2013, and in 2014 she was awarded residency at the Irish Museum of Modern Art.

Her work is permanently featured in the Whitney Museum of American Art, San Francisco Museum of Modern Art, New Orleans Museum of Art, Smithsonian American Art Museum, and Museum of Contemporary Photography.

Deborah Luster lives and works in New Orleans, Louisiana, United States, and Galway, Ireland.
