= Carolyn D. Wright =

American poet

- Born: Carolyn Doris Wright; January 6, 1949; Mountain Home, Arkansas, United States
- Died: January 12, 2016 (aged 67); Barrington, Rhode Island, United States
- Education: University of Memphis; University of Arkansas
- Occupations: Poet; professor

Carolyn D. Wright (January 6, 1949 – January 12, 2016) was an American poet. She was a MacArthur Fellow, a Guggenheim Fellow, and the Poet Laureate of Rhode Island.

== Life and career ==
C. D. Wright was born in Mountain Home, Arkansas, to a chancery judge and a court reporter. She earned a BA in French from Memphis State University in 1971 and briefly attended law school before leaving to pursue an MFA at the University of Arkansas, which she received in 1976. Her poetry thesis was titled Alla Breve Loving.

In 1977, Lost Roads Publishers published Wright's first collection, Room Rented by A Single Woman. After its founder Frank Stanford died in 1978, Wright took over Lost Roads, continuing its mission of publishing new poets and starting the practice of publishing translations. In 1979, she moved to San Francisco, where she met poet Forrest Gander. Wright and Gander married in 1983 and had a son, Brecht. They were co-editors at Lost Roads until 2005.

In 1981, Wright and Gander moved to Dolores Hidalgo, Mexico, where she completed her third book of poems, Translation of the Gospel Back into Tongues. In 1983, they moved to Providence, Rhode Island, where she began teaching at Brown University as the Israel J. Kapstein Professor of English. Over the next 30 years, Wright won many major American literary prizes (including fellowships from the Lila Acheson Wallace, Guggenheim, Lannan, and MacArthur Foundations). Her works include Translation of the Gospel Back into Tongues, Further Adventures with You, Deepstep Come Shining, One Big Self, and One With Others. In 2013, Wright was elected a chancellor of the Academy of American Poets. Stephanie Burt has described Wright as an Elliptical poet. Joel Brouwer said she "belongs to a school of exactly one."

C.D. Wright died on January 12, 2016. At the time of her death, she was living in Barrington, Rhode Island.

== Poetry ==
Wright's poetry often employs distinct voices in dialogue, particularly those of the Southern United States. Her work is formally inventive and often documentary in spirit. Her diction mixes high and low to surprising effect, and her range of references is broad, including phrases from other languages, allusions to other poems, and pieces of conversation. Her books include short works as well as book-length poems beginning with Just Whistle, her first collaboration with photographer Deborah Luster.

In a 2001 interview with Kent Johnson, Wright said:

As to my own aesthetic associations—affiliations, sympathies—I have never belonged to a notable element of writers who identified with one another partly because I come from Arkansas, specifically that part of Arkansas known for its resistance-to-joining, a non-urban environment where readily identifiable groups and sub-groups are less likely to form.

In the same interview, she stated:

The theoretically driven San Francisco poets who were in cahoots with poets in New York and conversant with European vanguard movements—they provided me with a need to become critically aware of my back-home ways; sharpened me to a degree. I'm grateful for the exposure, the education. I am indebted to particular poets' work from that point in time, but I am not an intellectual in the sense that qualifies or requires me to belong to a manifestoed-group. And of course one comes to take some pride in one's own outsider status.

Wright published literary maps of both Rhode Island and Arkansas. Wright's later work includes String Light; Deepstep Come Shining, a book-length poem; and One Big Self: Prisoners of Louisiana, another collaboration with photographer Deborah Luster. One Big Self: An Investigation contains just the poems. Her poems are featured in American Alphabets: 25 Contemporary Poets (2006) and other anthologies. One With Others mixes investigative journalism, history, and poetry to explore the civil rights movement and the role her mentor Margaret Kaelin McHugh played in a 1969 March Against Fear in Arkansas. Shortly after Wright's death in January 2016, Copper Canyon Press published The Poet, the Lion, Talking Pictures, El Farolito, a Wedding in St. Roch, the Big Box Store, the Warp in the Mirror, Spring, Midnights, Fire & All, a book of prosimetric essays, and ShallCross, a book of both short- and long-form poems.

== Awards and honors ==
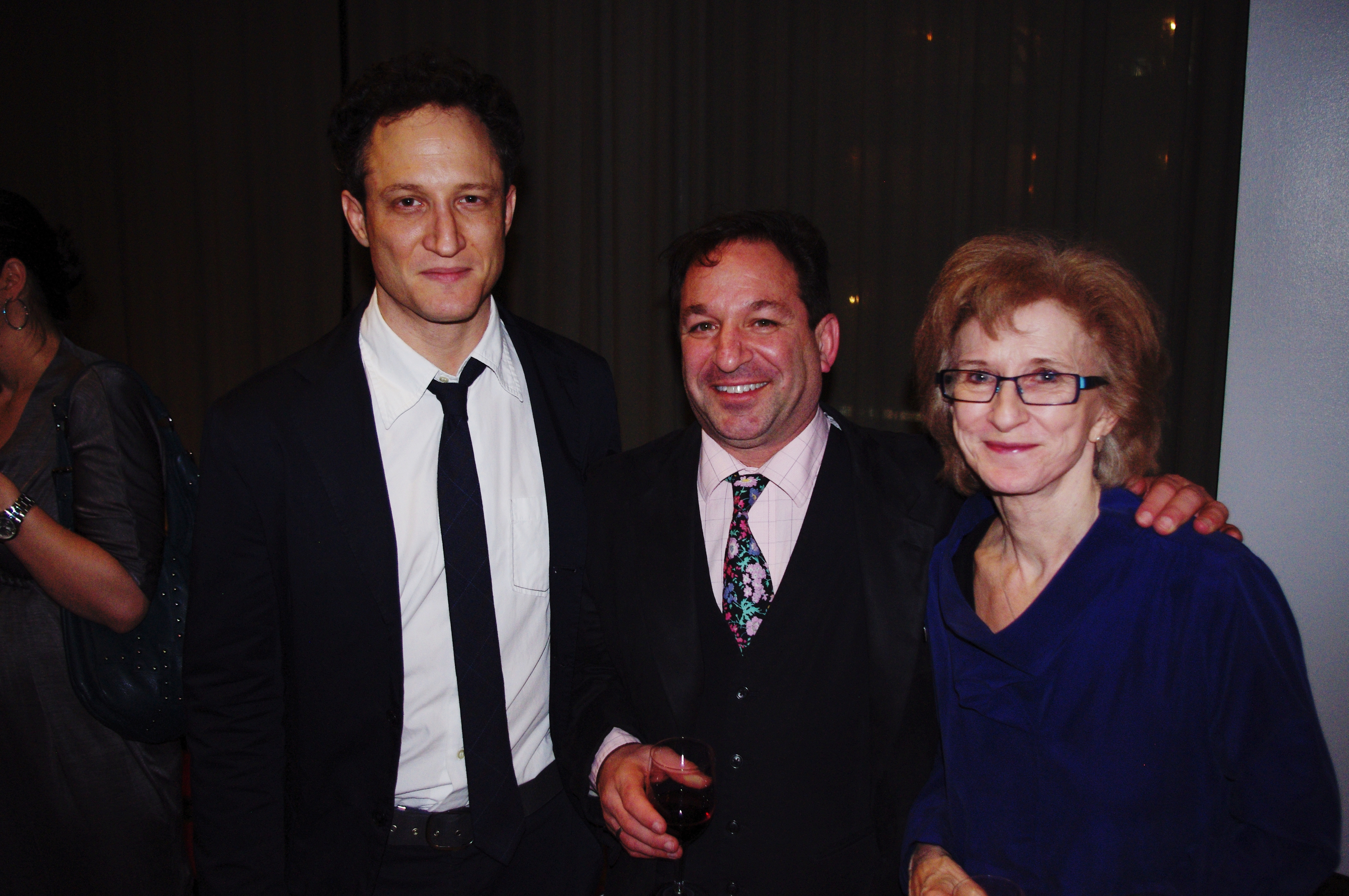
John Reed, David Biespiel and Wright at the after party for the National Book Critics Circle Awards, March 2012

- 1987 Guggenheim Fellowship
- 1989 Whiting Award in Poetry for Steal Away
- 1994–99 Poet Laureate of Rhode Island
- 1999 Foundation for Contemporary Arts Grants to Artists
- 2003 Griffin Poetry Prize shortlist for Steal Away
- 2004 MacArthur Fellowship
- 2005 Robert Creeley Award
- 2009 Griffin Poetry Prize for Rising, Falling, Hovering
- 2010 National Book Award for Poetry finalist for One With Others
- 2010 National Book Critics Circle Award for Poetry for One With Others
- 2011 Lenore Marshall Poetry Prize, One With Others

== Works ==
- 1977: Room Rented By A Single Woman (Lost Roads Publishers)
- 1979: Terrorism (Lost Roads Publishers)
- 1981: Translation of the Gospel Back into Tongues (SUNY Press)
- 1986: Further Adventures with You (Carnegie Mellon University Press)
- 1991: String Light (University of Georgia Press)
- 1993: Just Whistle: A Valentine (Kelsey Street Press) — photographs by Deborah Luster
- 1996: Tremble (Ecco Press)
- 1998: Deepstep Come Shining (Copper Canyon Press)
- 2002: Steal Away: New and Selected Poems (Copper Canyon Press)
- 2003: One Big Self: Prisoners of Louisiana (Twin Palms) — with photographs by Deborah Luster
- 2005: Cooling Time: An American Poetry Vigil (Copper Canyon Press)
- 2007: One Big Self: An Investigation (Copper Canyon Press)
- 2008: Rising, Falling, Hovering (Copper Canyon Press)
- 2009: 40 Watts (Octopus Books)
- 2010: One With Others (Copper Canyon Press)
- 2011: Jean Valentine Abridged: Writing a Word; Changing It (Albion Books)
- 2012: The Other Hand (Horse Less Press)
- 2016: The Poet, The Lion, Talking Pictures, El Farolito, A Wedding in St. Roch, The Big Box Store, The Warp in the Mirror, Spring, Midnights, Fire & All (Copper Canyon Press)
- 2016: ShallCross (Copper Canyon Press)
- 2019: Casting Deep Shade: An Amble (Copper Canyon Press)
- 2025: The Essential C. D. Wright (Copper Canyon Press)
