= Carol Moldaw =

American poet, novelist and critic (born 1956)

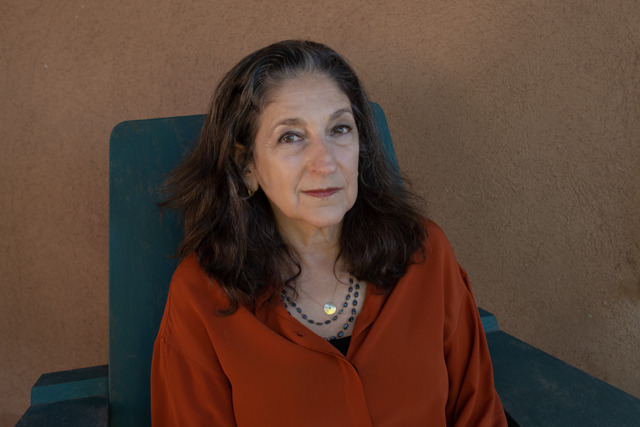
- Carol Moldaw
- Born: 1956 (age 69–70); Oakland, California, U.S.
- Education: Radcliffe College (BA); Boston University (MA)
- Spouse: Arthur Sze
- Children: 1
- Writing career
- Genres: Poetry, fiction, essays
- Notable works: Go Figure; So Late, So Soon; The Widening; The Lightning Field
- Notable awards: Pushcart Prize, NEA, FIELD Poetry Prize
- Website: carolmoldaw.com

Carol Moldaw (born 1956) is an American poet, novelist and critic. Her book The Lightning Field (2003) won the FIELD Poetry Prize.

== Biography ==
Carol Moldaw was born in 1956, in Oakland, California and grew up in the San Francisco Bay Area. Her father Stuart G. Moldaw was a noted businessperson, and philanthropist, he started a venture capital firm and various retail companies including Ross Stores, and Gymboree.

Moldaw received an A.B. degree in 1979 from Radcliffe College (now Harvard College), and an M.A. degree from Boston University.

Moldaw's poems have been published widely, her work has appeared in The Academy of American Poets, AGNI, American Poetry Review, Georgia Review, Harvard Review, Kenyon Review, The New Republic, The New Yorker, The Paris Review, Parnassus, Poem-A-Day, Poetry, The Threepenny Review, TriQuarterly, Virginia Quarterly Review and The Yale Review.

Moldaw’s prose has also been published in numerous journals and magazines including AGNI Magazine, The Antioch Review, The Boston Review, Conjunctions, The Massachusetts Review, Partisan Review and Plume. Her poems have been anthologized in Western Wind: An Introduction to Poetry (McGraw-Hill), A Century of Poetry in The New Yorker 1925–2025 (Knopf), Pushcart Prize XLVI: Best of the Small Presses and Under 35: A New Generation of American Poets (Anchor), and her work has been translated into Chinese, Italian, Portuguese and Turkish.

Moldaw is the recipient of several literary distinctions including an NEA Creative Writing Fellowship, a Pushcart Prize, and a Lannan Foundation Marfa Writer’s Residency.

While never a full-time academic, Moldaw has taught creative writing in a number of programs across the US, including the Stonecoast MFA Program in Creative Writing and the creative writing program at the College of Santa Fe (now Santa Fe University of Art and Design). She was a Visiting Writer at Bucknell University's Stadler Center for Poetry and the Louis D. Rubin, Jr., Writer-in-Residence at Hollins University. Moldaw has taught workshops at the Taos Summer Writers' Conference, Vermont Studio Center and Naropa University.

She lives in Santa Fe, New Mexico with her husband, Arthur Sze, and their daughter.

== Books ==
=== Poetry ===
- Moldaw, Carol (1993). Taken from the River. New York, NY: Alef Books. ISBN 978-1882509003.
- Moldaw, Carol (1998). Chalkmarks on Stone. Albuquerque, NM: La Alameda Press. ISBN 978-1888809077.
- Moldaw, Carol (2001). Through the Window. Albuquerque, NM: La Alameda Press. ISBN 978-1888809305.
- Moldaw, Carol (2003). The Lightning Field. Oberlin, OH: Oberlin College Press. ISBN 978-0932440945.
- Moldaw, Carol (2010). So Late, So Soon: New and Selected Poems. Wilkes-Barre, PA: Etruscan Press. ISBN 978-0981968728.
- Moldaw, Carol (2018). Beauty Refracted. New York, NY: Four Way Books. ISBN 978-1945588075.
- Moldaw, Carol (2024). Go Figure. New York, NY: Four Way Books. ISBN 978-1961897045.

=== Fiction ===
- Moldaw, Carol (2008). The Widening. Wilkes-Barre, PA: Etruscan Press. ISBN 978-0974599595.

== Honors and awards ==
- National Endowment for the Arts, creative writing fellowship in poetry, 1994
- FIELD Poetry Prize, Oberlin College, 2002
- Pushcart Poetry Prize, 2002
- Lannan Foundation, Marfa writers residency, 2006
- Merwin Conservancy, artist-in-residence in Hawaii, 2022
