= Ramona Sakiestewa =

Native American Hopi artist (born 1948)

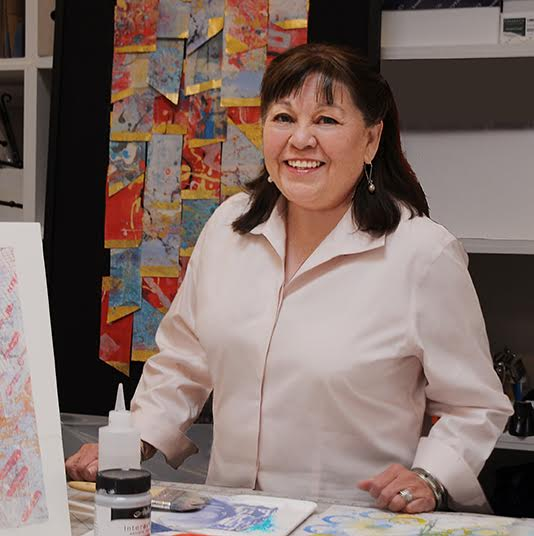
- Sakiestewa in 2015
- Born: Ramona Lynn Sakiestewa; May 25, 1948 (age 78); Albuquerque, New Mexico, U.S.
- Citizenship: American, Hopi
- Education: School of Visual Arts
- Occupations: Visual artist, arts administrator
- Known for: Tapestries, printmaking, works on paper
- Spouses: Arthur Sze (m. 1978); Andrew F. Merriell (m. 1998)
- Website: ramonasakiestewa.com

Ramona Sakiestewa (born 1948) is a Hopi Native American contemporary artist, who lives in Santa Fe, New Mexico. Sakiestewa is renowned for her tapestries, printmaking, works on paper, public art, and architectural installations.

== Early life and education ==
Ramona Sakiestewa was born on May 25, 1948, in Albuquerque, New Mexico, to a Hopi father and German-English-Irish mother. She studied at Verde Valley School in Sedona, Arizona, and Santa Fe Prep in Santa Fe, New Mexico. To further her understanding of design and color, Sakiestewa traveled to New York City in 1966, to study at the School of Visual Arts.

After she returned to the Southwest, where she took a job as an arts administrator at Santa Fe's Museum of New Mexico.

== Career ==
=== Early career ===
Sakiestewa is a self-taught weaver using prehistoric Pueblo techniques from the American Southwest. Her early work employed hand spun and hand dyed yarns. She researched native plant dyes of the Americas along with developing and reproducing cochineal and indigo dyeing techniques. She adapted traditional upright continuous warp weaving methods to horizontal floor loom weaving. In 1981 Sakiestewa opened her weaving studio, Ramona Sakiestewa Ltd., weaving one-of-a-kind tapestries full-time.

Sakiestewa's earliest weavings were simple banded floor rugs in the classic Pueblo style with a contemporary palette. She taught herself by reading books and with the help of a few generous acquaintances. She mastered techniques for dyeing yarn and began showing her work at Santa Fe Indian Market. Sakiestewa's preferred tapestry size was 50" x 70" inches. Her imagery remains abstract—the style that comes most naturally, she says, and captures the essence of her subject, whether inspired by ritual objects, ceremony, or the landscape of the Southwest.

"(Sakiestewa) has pressed issues of scale, texture, color and tone in works that shatter old barriers separating weaving, painting and mixed media." - Ann Lane Hedlund

In the late 1980s Sakiestewa wove thirteen tapestries from the drawings of Frank Lloyd Wright for the Frank Lloyd Wright Foundation, Phoenix, Arizona. From 1985 to 1991 she also completed six tapestries for the Gloria Frankenthaler Ross atelier, New York City, of paintings by contemporary painter Kenneth Noland. Sakiestewa co-founded a textile company and was commissioned to design a series of limited edition blankets for Dewey Trading Company, woven by Pendleton Blankets in Pendleton, Oregon; and a limited edition, "Ancient Blanket Series", woven by Scalamandre in Long Island City, New York.

=== Architecture and design ===
In 1994, Sakiestewa was invited to join the architectural design team for the National Museum of the American Indian, Smithsonian Mall Museum, Washington, D.C. A 10-year project, Sakiestewa created a design vocabulary for the project and collaboratively designed architectural elements for the museum that opened September 21, 2004. Design features included the building's main entry doors, the Entry Plaza Birthdate, a 100-foot copper screen wall, a 60-foot wide theater curtain, and other architectural elements throughout the building. She authored the contributing essay, "Making Our World Understandable" in the companion book, Spirit of a Native Place: Building the National Museum of the American Indian.

In 2009 Sakiestewa closed her weaving studio to further develop her works-on-paper and painting and architectural projects. Continuing her work with architects Sakiestewa designed architectural elements for the Tempe Center for the Performing Arts, Tempe, Arizona (2002–07); the Kurdistan Regional Government project, Erbil, Iraq (2008–11); the Chickasaw Cultural Center, Ada, Oklahoma (2002–04); and the Komatke Health Center, Gila, Arizona (2006–07).

Sakiestewa's experience with public art and her expertise in Native American culture has developed into her being a sought-after advisor for national and international cultural projects. She worked as a design consultant for the observatory and astronomy center for the University of New Mexico.

Her work was included in the exhibition, Hearts of our People: Native Women Artists (2019), organized by the Minneapolis Institute of Art.

== Arts advocacy ==
In 1980, Sakiestewa became the first Native American woman to lead the Southwestern Association for Indian Arts (SWAIA), the nonprofit that hosts the annual Santa Fe Indian Market.

Sakiestewa served in the position of chair of the New Mexico Arts Commission]; trustee of the International Folk Art Foundation, Santa Fe; member of the National Park Service Concessions Management Advisory Board, Washington, DC, an appointment by the US Secretary of the Interior; member of the New Mexico Coin Commission, Santa Fe, a gubernatorial appointment; trustee of the Georgia O'Keeffe Museum in Santa Fe.

== Awards ==
Sakiestewa has received numerous awards for her artwork, including the New Mexico Governor's Award for Excellence in the Arts (2006), the Governor's Outstanding New Mexico Woman's Award (2006), induction into New Mexico Women's Hall of Fame (2006), the New Mexico Committee of the National Museum of Women in the Arts (2007); and a selected artist for Gift to the Nation, Friends of Art and Preservation in Embassies, Washington D.C. (2001). She received awards within the Contemporary Weaving division, Santa Fe Indian Market (1982–1991).

== Personal life ==
In 1978, Sakiestewa married poet Arthur Sze. They have one son, Micah Sakiestewa Sze. In 1998, Ramona married architect and exhibit designer Andrew F. Merriell.

== Museum collections ==
- Albuquerque Museum of Art and History, Albuquerque, New Mexico
- Birmingham Museum of Art, Birmingham, Alabama
- Denver Art Museum, Denver, Colorado
- Heard Museum, Phoenix, Arizona
- National Museum of American History, Smithsonian Institution, Washington, D.C.
- Mint Museum of Craft + Design, Charlotte, North Carolina
- New Mexico Museum of Art, Santa Fe, New Mexico
- Saint Louis Art Museum, St. Louis, Missouri
- Wheelwright Museum of the American Indian, Santa Fe, New Mexico
- University of Pennsylvania Museum of Archaeology and Anthropology, Philadelphia, Pennsylvania
