= Araki Yasusada =

Fictional Japanese poet

Araki Yasusada was a non-existent Japanese poet, generally thought (though unverified) to be the creation of American literature professor Kent Johnson (born 1955). The publication of Yasusada's poetry by major literary journals including the American Poetry Review, Grand Street and Conjunctions during the early 1990s created an embarrassing scandal for these publications.

== Araki's fictional biography ==
Araki Yasusada was supposedly a survivor of the Hiroshima atom bomb. He was born in 1907, attended Hiroshima University (before it was even founded, in 1949), worked in the postal service, and was conscripted into the Japanese army during World War II. He died of cancer in 1972. His son discovered his poems and notebooks and in 1991 they began to appear in print in the United States.

The 'notebooks' included editorial comments, smudged ink and illegible text, and other elaborate attempts to give the appearance of authenticity. They also included hints leading to their own unravelling, however, such as references to poets who probably would not be known to Japanese poets of the period and anachronistic references to such things as scuba divers.

== Kent Johnson ==
The real writer of the poems is widely believed to be Kent Johnson, professor of Highland Community College in Freeport, Illinois, though he has never claimed authorship. Beliefs about Johnson's role as author stem in no small part from the fact that Johnson edited the Yasusada texts for the Wesleyan University Press. Johnson also included Yasusada's poetry in his doctoral dissertation.

The texts that had been published in the poetry journals were sent to various academics from a variety of locations, presenting Yasusada as an invented persona that was used by one or more people who intended the keep the origin of the texts secret.

Johnson admitted to some critics that Yasusada was nothing but an invented pseudonym "somebody" used to conceal the writer's origin. Some editors, who asked Johnson who the real writer was, claim to have received different answers. One response was that the real writer was "Tosa Motokiyu", one of the three "Japanese translators"—or at least, 95 percent of the poems were his, the rest being Johnson's older work, which Motokiyu had requested to include in his Yasusada fiction. Johnson continued to lecture on Yasusada and denied the hoax in interviews. At one stage he claimed that Motokiyu asked Johnson to take credit for the poems before Motokiyu's death. Yet elsewhere he said that Motokiyu's name was yet another pseudonym.

There were a number of rumors about other supposed co-authors, including the leading avant-garde Mexican composer, Javier Alvarez, who appears as co-editor of the work with Johnson. Publishers demanded their money back and criticized the hoax. Wesleyan cancelled the publication of the poetry collection. Some critics noticed that Johnson had published similar poetry in 1986 under the name of Ogiwara Miyamori, in Ironwood magazine.

== Criticism ==
After the 'hoax' was discovered, several journals rejected previously accepted poems. The hoax has allegedly been called "a criminal act" by Arthur Vogelsang, editor of American Poetry Review, which had previously published a special supplement of Yasusada poems, including an alleged portrait of the author, but in letters to the Boston Review he denied having used the phrase. Michael Leong's long poem "Disorientations" remixes Doubled Flowering: From the Notebooks of Araki Yasusada and Roland Barthes' Empire of Signs in an act of critical collage. But numerous critics were supportive, praising both the conceptual nature of the fiction and the quality of the writing, including Roof Books that published the entire text in 1997.
