= Kiwao Nomura =

Kiwao Nomura 野村 喜和夫
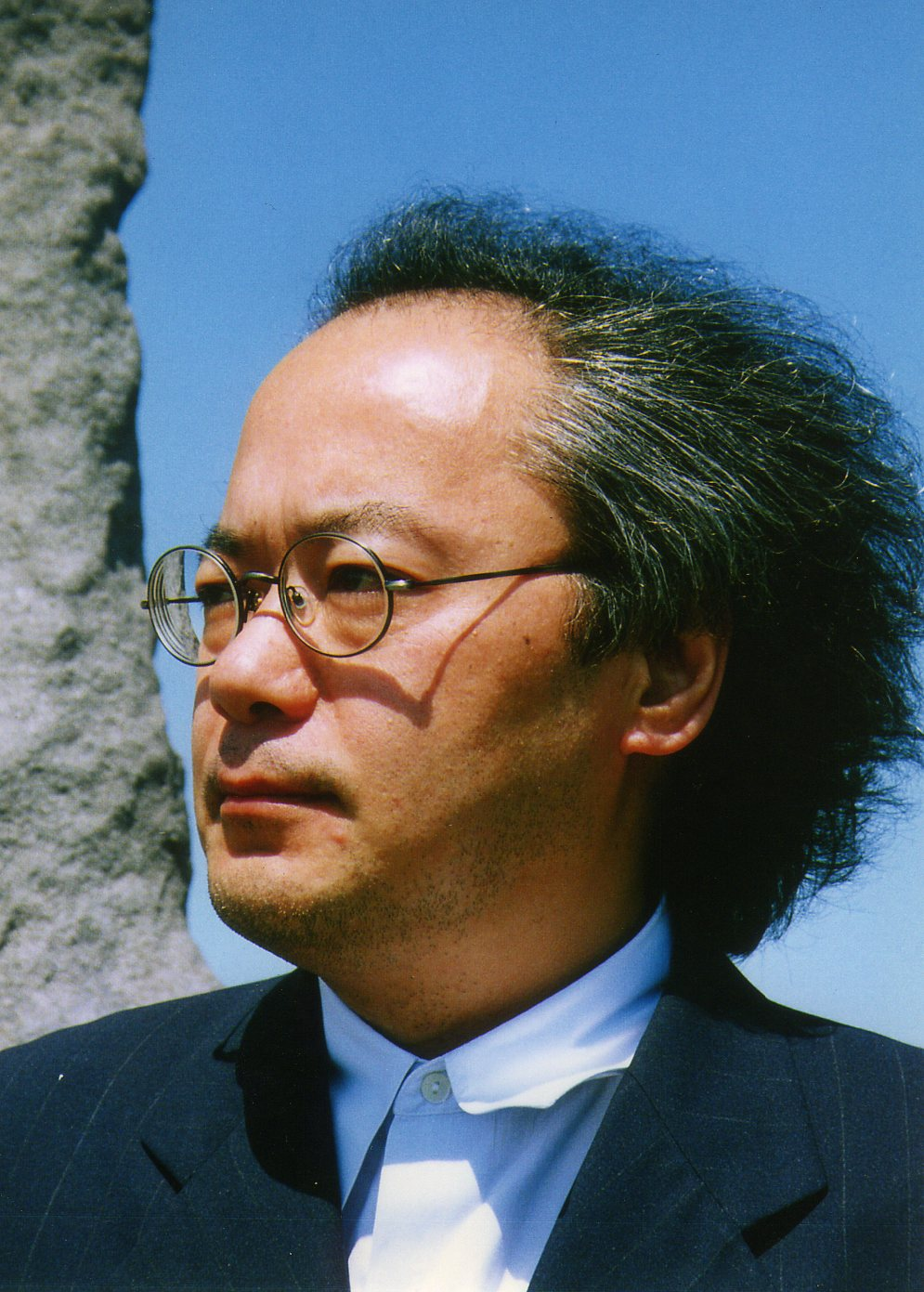
- Kiwao Nomura in February 2012
- Born: 20 October 1951 (age 74); Saitama Prefecture, Japan
- Occupation: Poet
- Writing career
- Language: Japanese
- Website: www.kiwao.com/index2.htm

Kiwao Nomura (野村 喜和夫, Nomura Kiwao; born 20 October 1951 in Saitama Prefecture) is a Japanese poet, writer, critic, and lecturer. He is considered one of the driving forces behind contemporary Japanese poetry.

== Literary style ==
The work of Nomura "plays with language in radical and diverse ways, employing subtleties of rhythm, semantics, image, gender, punctuation, and repetition, often all within the same short stanza." Forrest Gander, co-translator of Kiwao Nomura’s poetry, noted in an interview, "What we find in innovative Japanese poetries like Gozo Yoshimasu's and Kiwao Nomura's has, as far as I know, no equivalents in contemporary poetry in English. The mix of the philosophical and the whimsical makes for a tone that is absolutely weird to Westerners." According to Poetry International Web, "In all such experiments, Nomura shows himself to be very much in search of a center of gravity where the almost ritual repetitions and revisitations of captivating sounds and (often erotic) images dissolve of their own accord into the night, darkness, nothingness, the end of a delirium." Publishers Weekly concludes that Nomura's poems "succeed through astonishment, shock, and disorder, almost in the manner of Kathy Acker or William S. Burroughs."

== Published works ==
=== Books of poetry translated in English ===
- Spectacle & Pigsty: Selected Poems of Kiwao Nomura. Translated by Kyoko Yoshida and Forrest Gander. Richmond, CA: Omnidawn Publishing, 2011. ISBN 978-1-890650-53-7.
- The Day Laid Bare. Translated by Eric Selland. Tokyo & London: Isobar Press, 2020. ISBN 978-4-907359-32-4.

=== Books of poetry in Japanese (a selection) ===
- 川萎え [Dried River], 1987
- 反復彷徨 [Repeated Roams], 1992
- 特性のない陽のもとに [Under the Sun without Character], 1993
- 風の配分 [Distribution of the Wind], 1999
- ニューインスピレーション [New Inspiration], 2003
- スペクタクル [Spectacle], 2006
- plan14, 2007
- Z O L O, 2009
- Cafe spiral ou une heure en enfer [with images by Kenji Kitagawa]

=== Collaborative books of poetry ===
- 馬を野に放つ. (co-authored by Jan Lauwereyns, with images by Kris Martin; bilingual edition with a Dutch translation by Jan Lauwereyns) [Loose a Horse in the Field] Ghent, Belgium: Druksel, 2011.

== Awards ==
- Rekitei Prize for Young Poets
- Takami Jun Prize
- 2012 Best Translated Book Award, Spectacle & Pigsty
- 2020 The Japan Poets Association 38th Modern Poetry Prize for 薄明のサウダージ(Twilight Saudade, 2019)
