= Katherine Pierpoint =

English poet

- Born: 1961 (age 64–65); Northampton, England
- Education: Exeter University
- Occupation: Poet
- Writing career
- Notable work: Truffle Beds (1995)
- Notable awards: Somerset Maugham Award

Katherine Pierpoint (born 1961) is an English poet. She is best known for her book Truffle Beds which won a Somerset Maugham Award and was shortlisted for the T. S. Eliot Prize.

== Life and career ==
Pierpoint was born in Northampton in 1961. She studied languages at University of Exeter. Before becoming a full-time writer, she worked in publishing and marketing.

Truffle Beds, Pierpoint's first poetry book, was published in 1995 and won a Somerset Maugham Award and was shortlisted for the T. S. Eliot Prize. Her second book, a collection of translated poems by Coral Bracho, was written alongside Tom Boll and published in 2008.

She won a Hawthornden International Creative Writing Fellowship in 1993 and was named the Sunday Times Young Writer of the Year in 1996. She was the Royal Literary Fund Fellow at the University of Kent and was appointed the poet-in-residence at The King's School, Canterbury in 2006. Pierpoint's work has also appeared in the Spanish anthology La generación del cordero: antología de la poesía actual en las islas británicas.
