= Eye Against Eye =

- Author: Forrest Gander
- Illustrator: Sally Mann
- Cover artist: Sylvia Frezzolini Severance
- Language: English
- Genre: Poetry
- Publisher: New Directions Books (New Directions Publishing Corporation)
- Publication date: 2005
- Publication place: United States
- Media type: Print
- Pages: 80 pp.
- ISBN: 0-8112-1635-7 (Paperback)
- OCLC: 60500306
- Dewey Decimal: 811/.54 22
- LC Class: PS3557.A47 E97 2005
- Preceded by: The Blue Rock Collection
- Followed by: Faithful Existence: Selected Essays

Eye Against Eye is a book of poetry by the American poet Forrest Gander published in 2005. It includes ten photographs by Sally Mann, for which Gander has written accompaniment pieces. It is divided into sections, and includes the following:

== Contents ==
- Poem

Burning Towers, Standing Wall

- Burning Towers, Standing Wall (Tabasco Province, Mexico)

(also featured in The Blue Rock Collection [Salt Editions, 2004-05])

- Ligature

(commissioned by Sam Truitt and featured, with the sculpture of Douglas Culhane, in the exhibition Magnitude: Words in Sculpture, Rubenstein Gallery, New York, NY, 2001; also featured in First Intensity [2002])

Present Tense

- Present Tense

(also featured in Crowd, Spring 2005)

- Ligature 2

Late Summer Entry - The Landscapes of Sally Mann (also featured in Conjunctions issue 32, 1999, and issue 37, 2001)

- River and Trees
- Photo Canto
- Ghost Sonata
- Road and Tree
- Science & Steepleflower
- Collodion
- Ivy Brick Wall
- Argosy for Rock and Grass
- Bridge & Swimmer
- The Broken Tower
- Late Summer Entry
- Ligature 3

(commissioned by Sam Truitt and featured, with the sculpture of Douglas Culhane, in the exhibition Magnitude: Words in Sculpture, Rubenstein Gallery, New York, NY, 2001; also featured in First Intensity [2002])

Mission Thief

- Mission Thief

(also featured in Conjunctions, Spring 2005)

- Ligature 4
