= Ryoko Sekiguchi =

Japanese poet and translator (born 1970)

- 関口涼子
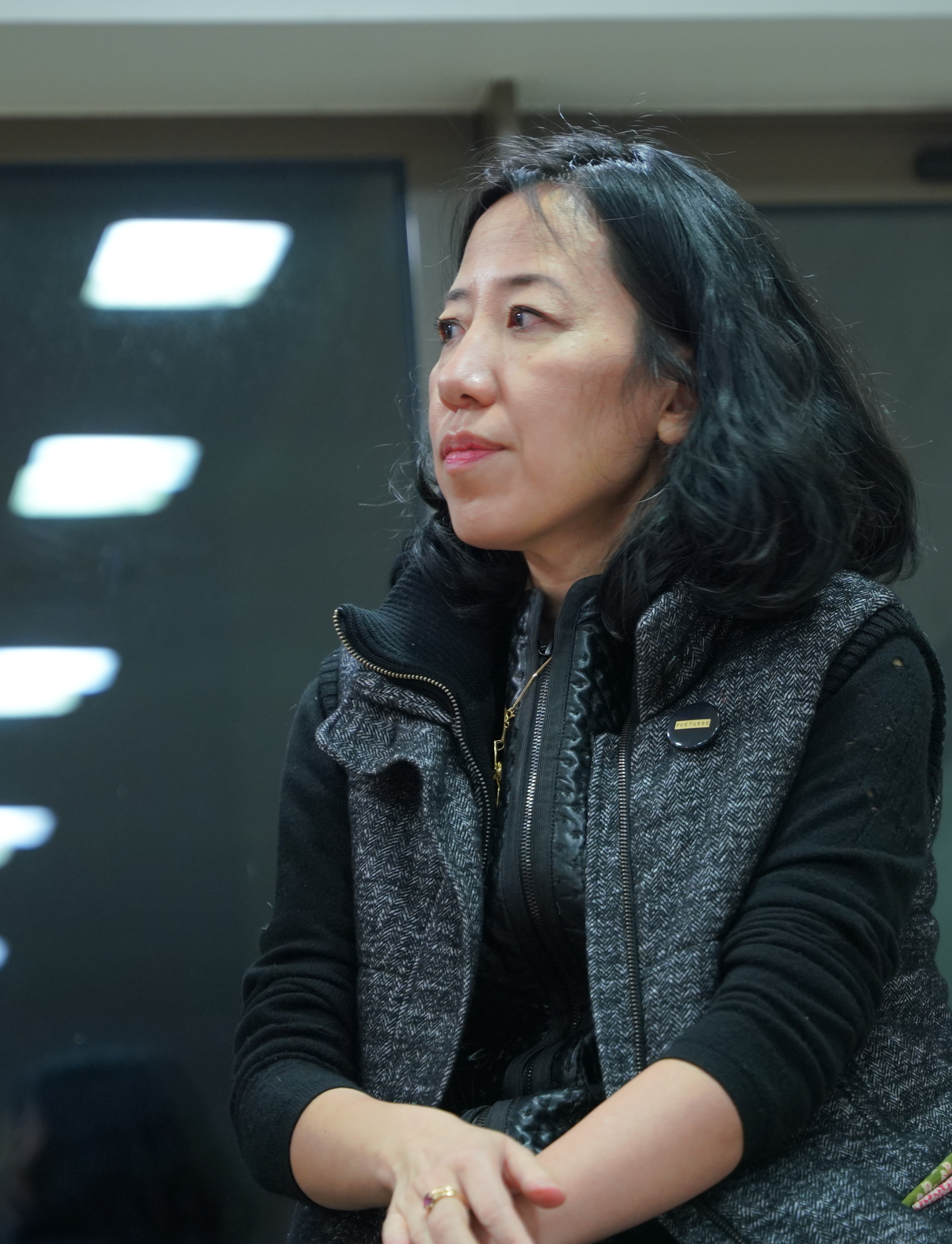
- Born: December 21, 1970 (age 55); Tokyo, Japan
- Education: University of Tokyo
- Occupations: Poet, translator
- Writing career
- Language: Japanese, French

Ryoko Sekiguchi (Japanese: 関口 涼子; Tokyo, December 21, 1970) is a Japanese poet and translator.

She studied journalism at Waseda University. After graduating, she studied History of Art at the Sorbonne and received a doctorate in comparative literature and cultural studies at the University of Tokyo. She publishes her books in both French and Japanese and works for institutions like Institut National des Langues et Civilisations Orientales.

A quote in French, attributed to Sekiguchi, appears at the top of the label of 2016 vintage Moulis-en-Médoc from Château Chasse-Spleen in Bordeaux: "Percevoir l'énigme sans prétendre la résoudre: la seule façon de vivre sa vie." ("To see the mystery, but not to solve it: the only way to live a life.")

== Works ==
- Manger fantôme, Argol, coll. Vivres, 2012.
- L'astringent, Argol, coll. Vivres, 2012.
- Ce n'est pas un hasard, Chronique japonaise, P.O.L., 2011.
- Adagio ma non troppo, Le Bleu du ciel, 2007.
- Héliotropes, P.O.L, 2005.
- Deux marchés, P.O.L, 2005.
- Le Monde est rond, with Suzanne Doppelt and Marc Charpin, Créaphis, 2004.
- Calque, P.O.L, 2001.
- Cassiopée Péca, cipM, 2001.
- Hakkouseï S´Diapositive, Tokio, 2000
- [Com] position, Tokio, 1996
- Cassiopée Péca, 1993

961 heures à Beyrouth 2021
