= Kent Johnson (poet) =

American poet (1955–2022)

Kent Johnson (June 23, 1955 – October 25, 2022) was an American poet, translator, critic, and anthologist. His work, much of it meta-fictional and/or satirical in approach, has provoked controversy and debate within English-language poetry circles.

== Life and career ==
Johnson lived most of his childhood and adolescence in Montevideo, Uruguay, returning to work there in the mid-1970s. In the early 1980s, on two extended visits, he worked with the Sandinista Revolution as a basic literacy and adult education volunteer in rural zones of Nicaragua. From 1991, he taught English and Spanish at Highland Community College in Freeport, Illinois. In 2004, he was named State Teacher of the Year by the Illinois Community College Board of Trustees.

From the late 1990s, Johnson was widely thought to be the author of the Araki Yasusada writings, which a reviewer for The Nation magazine, in 1998, called “the most controversial work of poetry since Allen Ginsberg's Howl.” Johnson, however, never officially claimed authorship of the material, presenting himself only as executor of an archive supposedly composed by a writer, or several writers, whose choice was to maintain a principled anonymity in relation to the work. The discussion around Yasusada eventually moved from literary scandal into scholarly considerations, with a number of academic articles engaging with the topic from various angles. In 2011, a book of critical studies, Scubadivers and Chrysanthemums: Essays on the Poetry of Araki Yasusada, was published in England, to which Johnson was one of eighteen contributors.

Lyric Poetry after Auschwitz: Eleven Submissions to the War was published in 2005 (its contents later included into a larger collection, Homage to the Last Avant-Garde, 2009). As the first book of poetry in the United States to respond to the wars in Afghanistan and Iraq, it was the subject of numerous reviews and blog commentaries, much of the latter hostile. The title poem of the collection, “Lyric Poetry after Auschwitz, or: Get the Hood Back On,” confronts the torture at Abu Ghraib and elsewhere. The poem proceeds in a series of stanzas set in the voices of American military prison guards, who calmly chat with Iraqi prisoners and describe their normal backgrounds at home, before graphically informing the prisoners of the tortures to which they will be subjected. The poem concludes unexpectedly when the voice of a generic U. S. poet joins the chorus of torturers, and in good-natured tone tells his captive to stop pleading and just accept the horror of his fate, because there is nothing that poetry can do to help him.

Johnson became the focus of controversy, including threatened legal action, when he published a book that proposed, by means of an elaborate, forensically detailed hypothesis (supplemented in the book by a quasi-detective novella), that the poet Kenneth Koch may have been the hidden author of “A True Account of Talking to the Sun at Fire Island,” one of Frank O’Hara's most well-known poems, composing it shortly after O’Hara's death, and then placing it under his late friend's name in an act of comradeship and mourning. First published in a limited edition in 2011, an expanded, second edition of this book, titled A Question Mark above the Sun: Documents on the Mystery Surrounding a Famous Poem "by" Frank O’Hara, was published in 2012 and named a book of the year by The Times Literary Supplement.

He has received a Pushcart Book of the Month selection, an Ohio Board of Regents grant for research in the Soviet Union, an Illinois Arts Council Poetry Prize, a National Endowment for the Arts Fellowship, a PEN Translation Grant, a nomination for the PEN Award for Poetry in Translation, a travel grant from the University of Chile, and a Visiting Writer Grant from the U.S. Embassy in Uruguay.

Johnson died on October 25, 2022, at the age of 67. He was survived by his wife, Deb, and his two sons.

== Selected works ==
=== Poetry ===
- Waves of Drifting Snow. Ox Head Press, 1986.
- Epigramititis: 118 Living American Poets. BlazeVOX Books, 2005.
- Lyric Poetry After Auschwitz: Eleven Submissions to the War. Effing Press, 2005.
- I Once Met. Longhouse Books, 2007.
- Homage to the Last Avant-Garde. Shearsman Books, 2008.
- 5 Works from the Rejection Group (with Kenny Goldsmith, Christian Bök, Vanessa Place, and Kasey Silem Mohammad). Habenicht Press, 2012.
- Homage to Villon: a Letter to Alan Golding in Middle-English Rhyme. Beard of Bees, 2014.
- Works and Days of the Fénéon Collective (anonymous contributor). Delete Press, 2010.
- Prize List. Delete Press, 2015.
- Homage to the Pseudo Avant-Garde: One Hundred and Sixty-Five Poems (2008-2016). Dispatches Editions, 2016.
- Because of Poetry, I Have a Really Big House. Shearsman Books, 2020.

=== Edited collections and translations ===
- A Nation of Poets: Writings from the Poetry Workshops of Nicaragua (translator). West End Press, 1985.
- Have You Seen a Red Curtain in my Weary Chamber: Poems, Stories and Essays by Tomás Borge (translator, with Russell Bartley and Sylvia Yoneda). Curbstone Press, 1989.
- Beneath a Single Moon: Buddhism in Contemporary American Poetry (editor, with Craig Paulenich). Shambhala Publications, 1990.
- Third Wave: The New Russian Poetry (editor, with Stephen Ashby). University of Michigan Press, 1992.
- Joyous Young Pines: Haiku by Araki Yasusada (editor). Juniper Press, 1995.
- Doubled Flowering: From the Notebooks of Araki Yasusada (editor). Roof Books, 1997.
- Immanent Visitor: Selected Poems of Jaime Saenz (translator, with Forrest Gander). University of California Press, 2002.
- The Miseries of Poetry: Traductions from the Greek (translator, with Alexandra Papaditsas). Skanky Possum Press, 2003.
- Dear Lacan: An Analysis in Correspondence (editor, with Jacques Debrot), Cambridge Conference of Contemporary Poetry, 2005.
- Also, with My Throat, I Shall Swallow Ten Thousand Swords: Letters of Araki Yasusada (editor). Combo Books, 2005.
- The Night (by Jamie Saenz, translator, with Forrest Gander). Princeton University Press, 2007.
- Hotel Lautreamont: Contemporary Poetry from Uruguay (editor, with Roberto Echavarren). Shearsman Books, 2012.
- The Herald of Madrid: César Vallejo's Lost Interview (translator, with Andrés Ajens). Ugly Duckling Presse 2014.
- Resist Much, Obey Little: Poems to the Resistance (editor, with Michael Boughn). Dispatches Editions, 2017.
- Materia Prima: Selected Poems of Amanda Berenguer (editor, with Kristin Dykstra). Ugly Duckling Presse, 2019.

=== Prose ===
- Poetic Architecture: Eleven Quizzes. BlazeVOX Books, 2007.
- Doggerel for the Masses. BlazeVOX Books, 2012.
- A Question Mark above the Sun: Documents on the Mystery Surrounding a Famous Poem “by” Frank O’Hara. Starcherone Books, 2012 (previously published by Punch Press, 2011).
- I Once Met: A Partial Memoir of the Poetry Field. Longhouse Books (revised and expanded edition), 2015.

=== Selected essays ===
- "Avant, Post-Avant, and Beyond". Boston Comment (Round table). 2003.
- "Imitation, Traduction, Fiction, Response". Jacket Magazine. April 2007.
- "Notes on Notes on Translation". Jacket Magazine. 2008.
- "Marjorie Perloff, Avant-Garde Poetics, and The Princeton Encyclopedia of Poetry and Poetics" (PDF). Chicago Review. Winter 2013.
- "Notes on Safe Conceptualisms". Caesura. September 2020.
- "Competence, Linguistics, Politics & Post-Avant Matters". Absent Magazine.
- Card File, or: Why Communism Looks Out of Their Eyes (50 Graphs on Conceptual Writing). Chicago Review. Fall 2014/Winter 2015.
