= Rick Benjamin (writer) =

American poet

Rick Benjamin was the fifth poet laureate of the American State of Rhode Island. His term began in 2013 and ended in 2017. Benjamin left the position of Poet Laureate to accept a teaching position at the University of California, Santa Barbara.
