= Padmini Chettur =

Indian dancer

- Born: 1970 (age 55–56)
- Occupations: dancer, choreographer
- Years active: 1989–present
- Dancing career
- Current group: "Padmini Chettur Dance Company"

Padmini Chettur (born 1970) is an Indian contemporary dancer, trained by dancer-choreographer Chandralekha. She runs her own dance company based in Chennai, India, "Padmini Chettur Dance Company".

== Early life and education ==
Padmini Chettur was born in 1970 and began her training in the Indian classical dance-styles Bharata Natyam as a child. She graduated from Birla Institute of Technology and Science, Pilani (BITS Pilani) in 1991.

== Career ==
Padmini presented her first contemporary experiment in 1989.

In 1991 she joined the dance company run by Chandralekha and worked with it till 2001, performing in the productions ‘Lilavati,’ ‘Prana,’ ‘Angika,’ ‘Sri,’ ‘Bhinna Pravaha,’ ‘Yantra,’ ‘Mahakaal’ and ‘Sharira.’ Meanwhile, she presented her first solo work ‘Wings and Masks’ (1999). This was followed by ‘Brown', the duet 'Unsung’, ‘Fragility’ (2001) – a group production, and ‘Solo’ (2003) in three sections, and then came another group production ‘Paperdoll’. Her production, ‘Pushed’ premiered at Seoul Performing Arts Festival (SPAF) 2006, and travelled to Brussels, Holland, Salzburg, Paris and Lisbon. ‘Beautiful Thing 1’ and ‘Beautiful Thing 2’ were created as a group and a solo work respectively – exploring the politics of beauty of the body and the space. These were performed extensively in India and abroad. ‘Wall Dancing’ came next as a group production with further explorations in that line – pushing the boundaries of the notion of dependency of bodies with one another as well that with the space. This was also her first non-proscenium work that travelled within India and to Vienna and Singapore. While working with 'Wall Dancing', she created ‘Kolam’ in association with French choreographer David Rolland as part of his production. It is a dance piece created on a massive carpet with a Kolam designed on it. Padmini is currently working on a group piece exploring the notion of distance and longing by working with a Varnam in a contemporary way – relevant to current socio-cultural scenario.

She has been artist in residence in England, the Netherlands, Germany and elsewhere. She is also one of the co-founders (along with dancer-choreographer Preethi Athreya, musician-composer Maarten Visser and theater-director-actor Pravin Kannanur) of an artists' collective based in Chennai, India – known as Basement 21.

== Works ==
- Wings and Masks (Production / Performance, 1999)
- Fragility (Production / Performance, 2001)
- Solo (Production / Performance, 2003)
- Paperdoll (Production / Performance, 2005)
- Pushed (Production / Performance, 2006)
- Beautiful Thing 1 (Production / Performance, 2009)
- Beautiful Thing 2 (Production / Performance, 2011)
- Wall Dancing (Production / Performance, 2012)
- Kolam (In association with David Rolland) (Production / Performance, 2014)
- Varnam (Production / Performance, 2016)
