= Sight Lines =

2019 poetry collection by Arthur Sze

- First edition cover
- Author: Arthur Sze
- Cover artist: Eve Aschheim
- Language: English
- Genre: Poetry
- Publisher: Copper Canyon Press
- Publication date: April 9, 2019
- Publication place: United States
- Media type: Print (paperback)
- Pages: 80
- Awards: National Book Award for Poetry (2019)
- ISBN: 978-1-55659-559-2
- OCLC: 1050955727
- Dewey Decimal: 811/.54
- LC Class: PS3569.Z38 A6 2019

Sight Lines is the tenth poetry collection by Arthur Sze. It was published by Copper Canyon Press in April 9, 2019.

The collection won the 2019 National Book Award for Poetry (USA). Judges of the prize praised Sze's "quiet mastery which generates beautiful, sensuous, inventive, and emotionally rich poems."

== Contents ==
- "Water Calligraphy"
- "Stilling to North"
- "No one"
- "Westbourne Street"
- "Cloud Hands"
- "In the Bronx"
- "Unpacking a Globe"
- "During the Cultural Revolution"
- "Traversal"
- "The Radiant's"
- "Doppler Effect"
- "Adamant"
- "A woman detonates"
- "Python Skin"
- "Lichen Song"
- "Black Center"
- "Under a Rising Moon"
- "Light Echoes"
- "First Snow"
- "Salt cedar"
- "Courtyard Fire"
- "White Sands"
- "Salt Song"
- "The plutonium waste"
- "Sprang"
  - 1 "Winter Stars"
  - 2 "Hole"
  - 3 "Talisman"
  - 4 "Kintsugi"
  - 5 "Yellow Lightning"
  - 6 "Red-Ruffed Lemur"
  - 7 "This Is the Writing, the Speaking of the Dream"
  - 8 "Net Light"
  - 9 "Sprang"
- "A man who built"
- "Transfigurations --
- "Dawn Redwood"
- "Xeriscape"
- "The Far Norway Maples"
- "Sight Lines"
- "The Glass Constellation"

== Reception ==
Publishers Weekly called it "finely crafted and philosophical".

In her review for The New York Times, Tess Taylor wrote, "This is a poetry of assemblage, where violence and beauty combine and hang on Sze's particular gift for the leaping non sequitur."

Florian Gargaillo of the Colorado Review praised Sze's philosophy represented through strikethroughs, writing, "It is this degree of self-questioning, this wariness of authority in himself and others, that makes Sze such a valuable poet for this moment."
