= Forrest Gander =

Poet, essayist, novelist, critic, translator (born 1956)

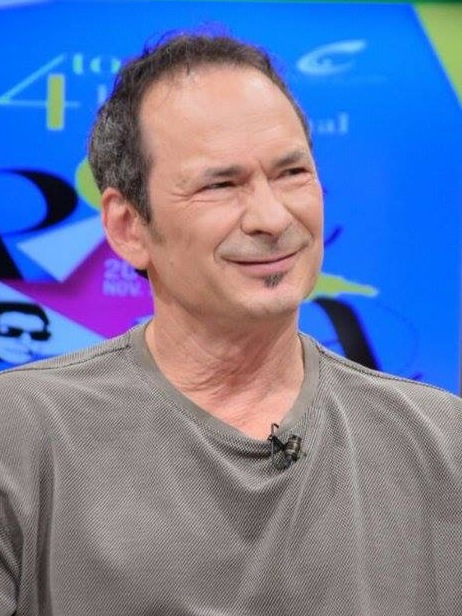
- Gander in 2017
- Born: January 21, 1956 (age 70); Barstow, California, U.S.
- Education: College of William and Mary (BS); San Francisco State University (MA)
- Occupation: Writer
- Spouse: C. D. Wright (m. 1983; died 2016) Ashwini Bhat
- Writing career
- Genres: Poetry, Fiction, Translation
- Notable awards: Pulitzer Prize for Poetry, Whiting Awards, Guggenheim Fellowship

Forrest Gander (born January 21, 1956) is an American poet, translator, essayist, and novelist. The A.K. Seaver Professor Emeritus of Literary Arts & Comparative Literature at Brown University, Gander won the Pulitzer Prize for Poetry in 2019 for Be With and is chancellor of the Academy of American Poets and a member of the American Academy of Arts and Sciences.

== Early life ==
Born in Barstow, California, Forrest Gander grew up in Virginia, where he and his two sisters were raised by their single mother, Ruth Clare Cockerille, an elementary school teacher. The four shared a two-room apartment in Annandale. Gander's estranged father ran the Mod Scene, a bar on Bleecker Street in Greenwich Village, New York City. With his mother and sisters, Gander began to travel extensively on summer road trips around the United States. The traveling, which never stopped, came to inform his interest in landscapes, languages, and cultures. Forrest and his two sisters were adopted by Walter J. Gander soon after his marriage to their mother. Gander earned a B.S. in geology from the College of William and Mary. After graduation, he had taken up a job in Washington DC, and had been considering a doctoral degree in paleontology when he was diagnosed with stage-three melanoma.

As he started to recover from melanoma, he decided to apply for MFA programs. He graduated with an M.A. in creative writing from San Francisco State University. There he met his first wife, C. D. Wright, with whom he relocated to Mexico for a number of years before returning and settling on the East Coast.

== Career ==
A writer of multiple genres, Gander is noted for his many collaborations with other artists, including Eiko & Koma. He is a United States Artists Rockefeller Fellow and the recipient of fellowships from the Library of Congress, the National Endowment for the Arts, the John Simon Guggenheim Foundation, The Whiting Foundation, and the Howard Foundation. In 2017, he was elected as a Chancellor to the Academy of American Poets and in 2019, he was awarded The Pulitzer Prize in poetry.

He taught at Providence College from 1988 to 2000, with visiting professorships to the Iowa Writer's Workshop and Brown University in between. He also taught at Harvard University before becoming the Adele Kellenberg Seaver Professor of Literary Arts and Comparative Literatures at Brown University in Providence, Rhode Island. At Brown, he led poetry and translation workshops, invited and hosted visiting writers and filmmakers, and taught seminars dedicated to eco-poetics, poetry in translation (with an emphasis on Latin America, and sometimes Asia), and to fellow poets such as the late Robert Creeley.

=== Writing and translation ===
David Kirby, writing in The New York Times Book Review notes that, "It isn't long before the ethereal quality of these poems begins to remind you of similar effects in the work of T. S. Eliot and the 17th century Anglo-Welsh mystic Henry Vaughan....In the midst of such questioning, the only reality is the poet's unflinchingly curious mind." Noting the frequency and particularity of Gander's references to ecology and landscape, Robert Hass, former U.S. Poet Laureate, calls him "a Southern poet of a relatively rare kind, a restlessly experimental writer." Gander's book Core Samples from the World was a finalist for 2012 Pulitzer Prize and the 2011 National Book Critics Circle Award. The Pulitzer citation notes that Core Samples from the World is "a compelling work that explores cross-cultural tensions in the world and digs deeply to identify what is essential in human experience." With Australian poet-activist John Kinsella, Gander wrote the cross-genre book Redstart: an Ecological Poetics.

Be With, published in 2018 by New Directions, was awarded the 2019 Pulitzer Prize in poetry and was longlisted for the 2018 National Book Award. It is an elegiac collection of poetry and testament to his anguish over the death of his wife. Gander eventually decided to stop reading publicly from the collection so as not to "perform his grief."

The subjects of Gander's formally innovative essays range from snapping turtles to translation to literary hoaxes. His critical essays have appeared in The Nation, Boston Review, and The New York Times Book Review.

In 2008, New Directions published As a Friend, Gander's novel of a gifted man, a land surveyor, whose impact on those around him provokes an atmosphere of intense self-examination and eroticism. In The New York Times Book Review, Jeanette Winterson praised As a Friend as "a strange and beautiful novel.... haunting and haunted." As a Friend has been published in translation in half a dozen foreign editions. In 2014, New Directions released Gander's second novel The Trace, about a couple who, researching the last journey of Civil War writer Ambrose Bierce, find themselves lost in the Chihuahua Desert. The New Yorker called it a "carefully crafted novel of intimacy and isolation." In The Paris Review, Robyn Creswell commented "Gander's landscapes are lyrical and precise ("raw gashed mountains, gnarly buttes of andesite"), and his study of a marriage on the rocks is as empathetic as it is unsparing."

Gander is a translator who has edited several anthologies of poetry from Spain, Mexico, and Latin America. In addition, Gander has translated distinct volumes by Mexican poets Pura López Colomé, Coral Bracho (for which he was a PEN Translation Prize finalist for Firefly Under the Tongue), Valerie Mejer Caso, and Alfonso D'Aquino, another poet connected with ecopoetry. With Kyoko Yoshida, Gander translated Spectacle & Pigsty: Selected Poems of Kiwao Nomura, winner of the 2012 Best Translated Book Award; in 2016, New Directions published Alice Iris Red Horse, selected poems of Yoshimasu Gozo, edited by Gander. The second book of his translations, with Kent Johnson, of Bolivian poet Jaime Saenz, The Night (Princeton, 2007), received a PEN Translation Award. Gander's critically acclaimed translations of the Chilean Nobel Laureate Pablo Neruda are included in The Essential Neruda: Selected Poems (City Lights, 2004).

In 2016, Copper Canyon Press released "Then Come Back: the Lost Neruda," a bilingual edition of Gander's translations of twenty previously unknown and unseen Neruda poems.

In 2018, Gander became a reviewer with New York Journal of Books.

=== Collaborations and editorial work ===
Gander has worked with artists Ann Hamilton and Gus Van Sant, photographers Lucas Foglia, Sally Mann, Graciela Iturbide, Peter Lindbergh, Michael Flomen, and Raymond Meeks, ceramics artists Ashwini Bhat and Richard Hirsch, dancers Eiko & Koma, painter Tjibbe Hooghiemstra, glass artist Michael Rogers, musicians Vic Chesnutt and Brady Earnhart, and others.

With CD Wright, Gander was a co-editor of Lost Roads Publishers for twenty years, soliciting, editing, and publishing books by more than thirty writers, including Michael Harper, Kamau Brathwaite, Arthur Sze, Fanny Howe, Steve Stern, Josie Foo, Frances Mayes, and Zuleyka Benitez.

== Personal life ==
Gander was married to the poet CD Wright until her death in 2016, which precipitated Gander's book Be With. Together the couple raised a son, the artist Brecht Wright Gander.

Gander lives now in Northern California. He is married to the artist Ashwini Bhat.

== Publications ==
Poetry collections

- Mojave Ghost (New Directions, 2024) ISBN 9780811237956
- Knot (Copper Canyon, 2022) ISBN 9781556596711
- Twice Alive (New Directions, 2021) ISBN 9780811230292
- Be With (New Directions, 2018) ISBN 0811226050
- Eiko & Koma (New Directions, 2013). ISBN 081122094X, OCLC 813539148
- Core Samples from the World (New Directions, 2011). ISBN 0811218872, OCLC 754070907
- Eye Against Eye (New Directions, 2005). ISBN 9780811216357, OCLC 60500306
- The Blue Rock Collection (Salt Publishing, 2004). ISBN 1844710459, OCLC 64277457
- Torn Awake (New Directions, 2001). ISBN 0811214869, OCLC 762403541
- Science & Steepleflower (New Directions, 1998). ISBN 0811213811
- Deeds of Utmost Kindness (Wesleyan University Press, 1994). ISBN 0819512125
- Lynchburg (University of Pittsburgh Press, 1993). ISBN 0822937468
- Rush to the Lake (Alice James Books, 1988). ISBN 0914086790 OCLC 17261293

Chapbooks

- A Sonnet of Mudras with Ashwini Bhat (Literarium, Third Man Books, 2021).
- Eggplants and Lotus Root (Burning Deck Press, 1991). ISBN 9780930901783, OCLC 779969742

Novels

- The Trace (New Directions, 2014). ISBN 9780811224864, OCLC 921186114
- As a Friend (New Directions, 2008). ISBN 9780811217453

Collaborative works

- Across/Ground with photographer Lukas Felzmann. (Lars Müller Publishers, 2024) ISBN 9783037787601
- Past Continuous Tense with artist Lam Tung Pang. (The Arion Press, 2023)
- Knot with photographer Jack Shear. (Copper Canyon, 2022) ISBN 9781556596711
- Redstart: An Ecological Poetics with poet John Kinsella. (University of Iowa Press, 2012) ISBN 160938119X OCLC 897201156
- Las Canchas with photographer Daniel Borris. (Blue Star Contemporary, 2009)
- Twelve X 12:00 with artist Tjibbe Hooghiemstra. (Philip Elchers, 2003)
- Sound of Summer Running with photographer Raymond Meeks. (Nazraeli Press, 2005)

Essay collections

- A Faithful Existence: Reading, Memory and Transcendence (Counterpoint, 2005). ISBN 159376071X

In translation

- 魂与结》新封面. Chinese translation of Knot and "Mojave Ghost". (East China Normal University Press, Shanghai, 2024).
- Podwojone życie. Polish translation of Twice Alive. (Wydawnictwo Ossolineum, Warsaw, 2023).
- 新生. Chinese translation of Twice Alive. (East China Normal University Press, Shanghai, 2022).
- 相伴. Chinese translation of Be With. (East China Normal University Press, Shanghai, 2021).
- Essere Con. Italian translation of Be With. (Benway Series, Italy, 2020).
- Bądź Blisko. Polish translation of Be With. (Lokator, Kraków, 2020).
- Poesie Scelte. Italian translation of poems from Be With. (La Camera Verde, Rome, 2019).
- Beckoned. Chinese translation of poems from Be With. (The Chinese University of Hong Kong Press, Hong Kong, 2019).
- Estar Con. Spanish translation of Be With. (Mangos de Hacha, Mexico City, 2019).
- Está Con. Spanish translation of Be With. (Libros de la resistencia, Madrid, 2019).
- Eiko & Koma. Japanese translation of Eiko & Koma. (Awai LLC, Tokyo, 2019).
- İz. Turkish translation of The Trace. (Yapi Kredi Yayinlari, Ankara, 2019).
- Şairin Vedasi. Turkish translation of As a Friend. (Yapi Kredi Yayinlari, Ankara, 2019).
- El Rastro. Spanish translation of The Trace. (Sexto Piso, Mexico City & Barcelona, 2016).
- Le Trace. French translation of The Trace. (Sabine Wespieser Editeur, Paris, 2016).
- Eiko & Koma y otros poemas. Spanish translation of selected poems. (Libros Magenta, Mexico D.F., 2016).
- 裸. Chinese translation of Naked: Selected Poems. (Intellectual Property Publishing House, Beijing, 2014).
- Como Amigo. Spanish translation of As a Friend. (Sexto Piso Editorial, Mexico City & Barcelona, 2013).
- Ligaduras. A work of selected poems in Spanish translation. (Ventana Abierta Editorial, Santiago, Chile, 2011).
- Als es dich gab. Roman. German translation of As a Friend. (Luxbooks, Wiesbaden, Germany, 2010).
- Libreto para eros. A work of selected poems in Spanish translation. (Amargord, Madrid, 2010).
- En Ami. French translation of As a Friend. (Sabine Wespieser Editeur, Paris, 2010).
- Като приятел. Bulgarian translation of As a Friend. (Altera, Sofia, Bulgaria, 2010).
- Arrancado del Sueño. Spanish translation of Torn Awake. (Ediciones El Tucan de Virginia, Mexico City, 2010).

Translations

- Even Time Bleeds: Selected Poems by Jeannette Lozano Clariond (Princeton University Press, 2025)
- Salitre by Alejandro Aguilar (Editorial Isla Negra, 2024). ISBN 9789945637618
- Names & Rivers by Shuri Kido (Copper Canyon, 2022) with Tomoyuki Endo. ISBN 9781556596612
- It Must Be a Misunderstanding by Coral Bracho (New Directions, 2022). ISBN 9780811231398
- Dylan and the Whales by Maria Baranda, The New World Written: Selected Poems (Yale University Press, 2021). ISBN 9780811231398
- The Galloping Hour: French Poems by Alejandra Pizarnik (New Directions, 2018) with Patricio Ferrari. ISBN 9780300241242
- Then Come Back : the Lost Neruda Poems (Copper Canyon Press, 2016) ISBN 9781556594946, OCLC 1556594941
- Alice Iris Red Horse: Selected Poems of Gozo Yoshimasu (New Directions, 2016). ISBN 9780811226042
- Berlin: Stories by Aleš Šteger (Counterpath Press, 2015) with Brian Henry & Aljaž Kovac.ISBN 9781933996509
- Rain of the Future: Poems by Valerie Mejer Caso edited by CD Wright (Action Books, 2014). ISBN 0989804801
- fungus skull eye wing: selected poems of Alfonso D'Aquino (Copper Canyon, 2013). ISBN 155659447X
- Watchword, by Pura Lopez Colome (Wesleyan University Press, 2012). ISBN 0819571180
- Spectacle & Pigsty: Selected Poems of Kiwao Nomura (Omnidawn, 2011) with Kyoko Yoshida. ISBN 1890650536
- Firefly Under the Tongue: Selected Poems of Coral Bracho (New Directions, 2008). ISBN 0811216845
- The Night: A Poem by Jaime Saenz (Princeton University Press, 2007) with Kent Johnson. ISBN 0691124833, OCLC 65065407
- No Shelter: Selected Poems of Pura Lopez Colome (Graywolf Press, 2002). ISBN 1555973604
- Immanent Visitor: Selected Poems of Jaime Saenz (University of California Press, 2002) with Kent Johnson. ISBN 0520230485

Anthologies edited

- Pinholes in the Night: Essential Poems from Latin America Selected by Raúl Zurita (Copper Canyon, 2013). ISBN 155659450X
- Panic Cure: Poems from Spain for the 21st Century (Seismicity Editions in USA; Shearsman Editions in UK, 2013). ISBN 0986017345
- Connecting Lines: New Poetry from Mexico (Sarabande Books, 2006). ISBN 1932511199, OCLC 61151490
- Mouth to Mouth: Poems by Twelve Contemporary Mexican Women (Milkweed Editions, 1993). ISBN 0915943719, OCLC 878430882

== Awards and honors ==
- National Endowment for the Arts Fellowship in poetry (1989, 2001)
- Gertrude Stein Award in Innovative North American Poetry (1997, 1993)
- Whiting Foundation Award, 1997
- Jessica Nobel Maxwell Memorial Prize (from American Poetry Review, 1998)
- Pushcart Prize, 2000
- PEN Translation Fund Grant from PEN American Center, 2004
- Howard Foundation Award, 2005
- Guggenheim Foundation Fellowship, 2008
- United States Artists Rockefeller Fellowship, 2008
- Library of Congress Witter Bynner Fellowship, 2011
- Best Translated Book Award 2012
- National Book Critics Circle Award Finalist, 2011
- Pulitzer Prize Finalist, 2012
- National Book Award Longlist 2018
- Pulitzer Prize for Poetry 2019

== Archives ==
The Forrest Gander papers at Yale University's Beinecke Library cover Gander's full writing life, and additions to the collection are regularly made by the author.
