= Arthur Sze =

American poet (born 1950)

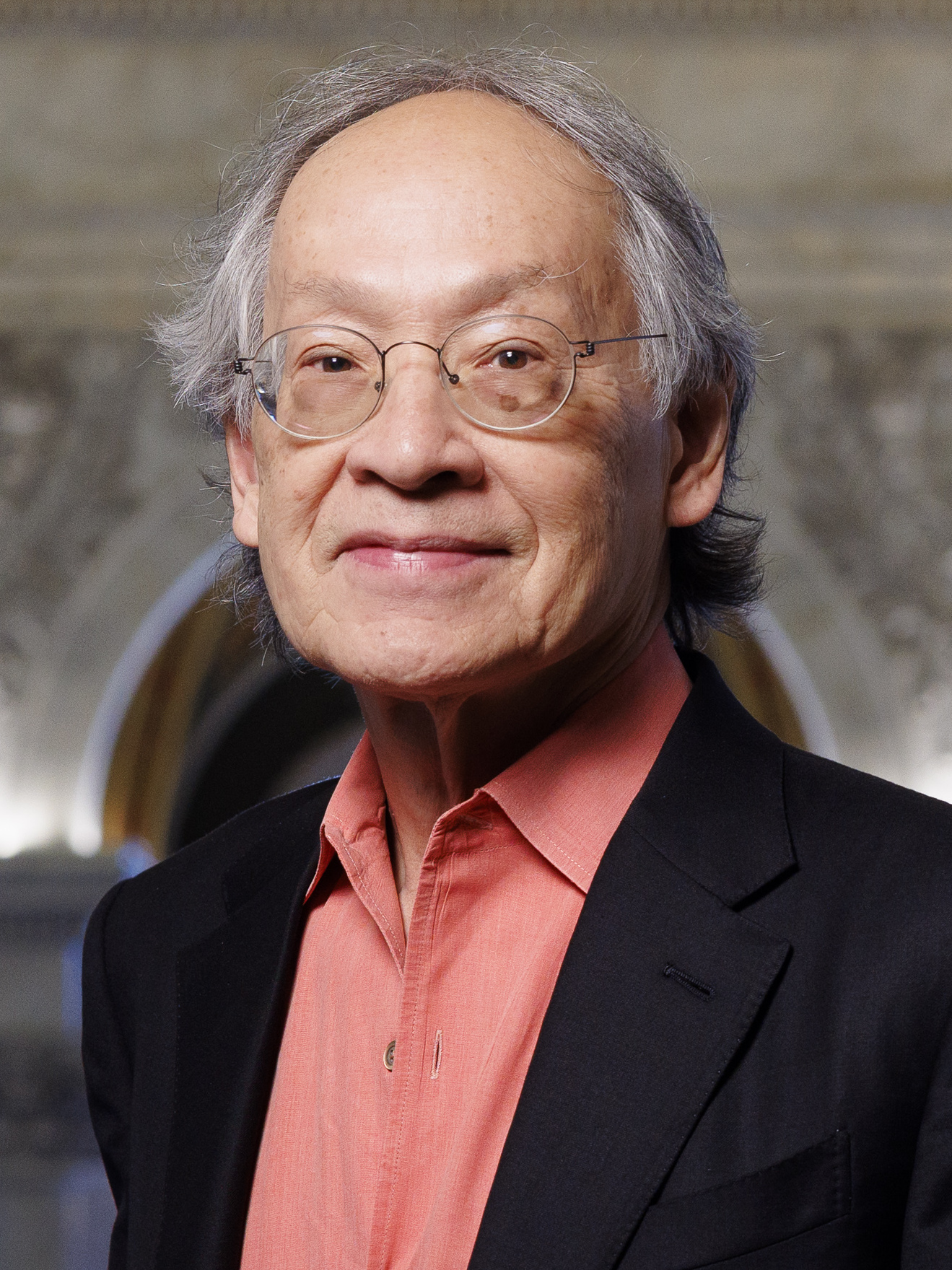
- Sze in 2025
- Born: 1950 (age 75–76); New York City, U.S.
- Education: Massachusetts Institute of Technology; University of California, Berkeley (BA)
- Occupations: Poet; translator; writer; professor
- Spouse(s): Ramona Sakiestewa (m. 1978–?; div.); Carol Moldaw
- Children: 2
- Writing career
- Language: English, Chinese
- Years active: 1972–present
- Genre: Poetry
- Notable works: Compass Rose (2014); Sight Lines (2019)
- Notable awards: National Book Award for Poetry (2019)

United States Poet Laureate
- In office October 9, 2025 – present
- Preceded by: Ada Limón

Arthur Sze (English: /ˈsiː/; Chinese: 施家彰; pinyin: Shī Jiāzhāng; born 1950) is an American poet, translator, editor, and professor. He is the 25th United States poet laureate, serving his term in 2025–26; on 14 April 2026 Sze was named to a second term as poet laureate for 2026–2027. Since 1972, he has published twelve collections of poetry. Sze's books include Into the Hush, a finalist for the 2026 PEN / Jean Stein Award (Copper Canyon, 2025), and The Glass Constellation: New and Collected Poems (Copper Canyon, 2021), which received a 2024 National Book Foundation Science and Literature Award. His tenth collection, Sight Lines, won the 2019 National Book Award for Poetry, and his ninth collection, Compass Rose (2014), was a finalist for the 2015 Pulitzer Prize for Poetry. Other previous books include The Ginkgo Light (Copper Canyon, 2009), selected for the Mountains & Plains Independent Booksellers Association Book Award in Poetry and a PEN Southwest Book Award; Quipu (Copper Canyon, 2005); The Redshifting Web: Poems 1970-1998 (Copper Canyon, 1998), selected for the Balcones Poetry Prize and an Asian American Literary Award; and Archipelago (Copper Canyon, 1995), selected for an American Book Award.

Sze was the first poet laureate of Santa Fe, New Mexico, where he resides and is a professor emeritus at the Institute of American Indian Arts.

== Early life and education ==
Sze is a second-generation Chinese American, born in New York City in 1950. He was raised in Queens and Garden City on Long Island. Sze graduated from the Lawrenceville School in 1968. Between 1968 and 1970, Sze attended the Massachusetts Institute of Technology. In 1970, he transferred to the University of California, Berkeley, to pursue poetry. He completed a BA (self-directed major in poetry) at UC Berkeley (1972; Phi Beta Kappa).

== Career ==
His poems have appeared in The American Poetry Review, The Atlantic, Boston Review, Conjunctions, Harper's Magazine,The Kenyon Review, The Nation, The New Republic, The New York Review of Books, The New Yorker, The New York Times, The Paris Review, Poetry, the Virginia Quarterly Review and The Yale Review Online, and have been translated into fifteen languages, including Chinese, Dutch, German, Korean, and Portuguese. He has authored twelve books of poetry, including Into the Hush (Copper Canyon Press, 2025), The Glass Constellation (Copper Canyon Press, 2021), Compass Rose (Copper Canyon Press, 2014). This latter volume was a finalist for the 2015 Pulitzer Prize for Poetry.

He has been included in six Best American Poetry anthologies, four Pushcart Prize anthologies, as well as Articulations: The Body and Illness in Poetry (University of Iowa Press, 1994), Premonitions: The Kaya Anthology of New Asian North American Poetry, (Kaya Production, 1995), I Feel a Little Jumpy around You (Simon & Schuster, 1996), What Book!?: Buddhist Poems from Beats to Hiphop (Parallax Press 1998), and American Alphabets (Oberlin College Press, 2006).

In 2012, Sze was elected a Chancellor of the Academy of American Poets. In 2017, he was elected to the American Academy of Arts & Sciences. In 2026, he was elected to the American Academy of Arts and Letters.

He was the 2023-2024 Mohr Visiting Poet at Stanford University, a Visiting Hurst Professor at Washington University in St. Louis, a Doenges Visiting Artist at Mary Baldwin College, and has conducted residencies at Brown University, Bard College, and Naropa University. He is a professor emeritus at the Institute of American Indian Arts, is the first poet laureate of Santa Fe and has won five grants from the Witter Bynner Foundation for Poetry.

He became the United States poet laureate in 2025. He is the first Asian American United States poet laureate. On 14 April 2026 Sze was named to a second term as poet laureate for 2026–2027.

=== Reception ===
The poet Jackson Mac Low has said: "The word 'compassion' is much overused, 'clarity' less so, but Arthur Sze is truly a poet of clarity and compassion." Albuquerque Journal reviewer John Tritica commented that Sze "resides somewhere in the intersection of Taoist contemplation, Zen rock gardens and postmodern experimentation." Critic R.W. French notes that Sze's poems "are complex in thought and perception; in language, however, they have the cool clarity of porcelain. The surface is calm, while the depths are resonant. There is about these poems a sense of inevitability, as though they could not possibly be other than what they are. They move precisely through their patterns like a dancer, guided by the discipline that controls and inspires."

== Personal life ==
Sze lives in Santa Fe, New Mexico, with his wife, Carol Moldaw, and their daughter. Sze also has a son from a previous marriage, to artist Ramona Sakiestewa.

Through his father Morgan, Arthur Sze is a grandson of S. C. Thomas Sze, a younger brother of Alfred Sao-ke Sze.

== Awards ==
- 2026 Academy of American Poets Leadership Award
- 2026 Asia Society Northern California Game Changer West Award
- 2025 Bollingen Prize for American Poetry for Lifetime Achievement from Yale University
- 2024 Rebekah Johnson Bobbitt National Prize for Lifetime Achievement from the Library of Congress
- 2024 National Book Foundation Science + Literature Award
- 2022 Ruth Lilly Poetry Prize for Lifetime Achievement from the Poetry Foundation
- 2021 The Shelley Memorial Award from the Poetry Society of America
- 2020 'T' Space 8th Annual Poetry Award
- 2019 National Book Award for Poetry
- 2015 Finalist, Pulitzer Prize for Poetry
- 2013 Jackson Poetry Prize, Poets & Writers
- 2012, 1997, 1994, 1983, 1980 Witter Bynner Foundation for Poetry Grants
- 2006–2008 Poet Laureate of Santa Fe, New Mexico
- 2002 Western States Book Award for Translation
- 1998–2000 Lila Wallace-Reader's Digest Writers' Award
- 1997 John Simon Guggenheim Memorial Foundation Fellowship
- 1996 American Book Award in Poetry
- 1995 Lannan Literary Award for Poetry
- 1993, 1982 National Endowment for the Arts Creative Writing Fellowships
- 1991 George A. and Eliza Gardner Howard Foundation Fellowship

== Works ==
=== Poetry ===
Collections

- The Willow Wind. Berkeley, California: Rainbow Zenith Press. 1972.
  - The Willow Wind: Poems and Translations from the Chinese (Revised ed.). Santa Fe, New Mexico: Tooth of Time Books. 1981.
- Two Ravens. Guadalupita, New Mexico: Tooth of Time Publications. 1976.
  - Two Ravens: Poems and Translations from the Chinese (Revised ed.). Santa Fe, New Mexico: Tooth of Time Books. 1984. ISBN 978-0-940510-09-8.
- Dazzled. Point Reyes Station, California: Floating Island Publications. 1982. ISBN 978-0-912449-07-4.
- River River. Providence, Rhode Island: Lost Roads Publishers. 1987. ISBN 978-0-918786-35-7.
- Archipelago. Port Townsend, Washington: Copper Canyon Press. 1995. ISBN 9781556591006.
- The Redshifting Web: Poems 1970–1998. Port Townsend, Washington: Copper Canyon Press. 1998. ISBN 9781556590887.
- Quipu. Port Townsend, Washington: Copper Canyon Press. 2005. ISBN 9781556592263.
- The Ginkgo Light. Port Townsend, Washington: Copper Canyon Press. 2009. ISBN 9781556592997.
- Compass Rose. Port Townsend, Washington: Copper Canyon Press. 2014. ISBN 9781556594670.
- Sight Lines. Port Townsend, Washington: Copper Canyon Press. 2019. ISBN 978-1-55659-559-2.
- Starlight Behind Daylight. Afton, Virginia: St Brigid Press. 2020.
- The Glass Constellation: New and Collected Poems (Copper Canyon Press, 2021)
- The White Orchard: Selected Interviews, Essays, and Poems (Museum of New Mexico Press, 2025)
- Into the Hush (Copper Canyon Press, 2025)

Translations

- The Silk Dragon: Translations of Chinese Poetry. Port Townsend, Washington: Copper Canyon Press. 2001. ISBN 978-1-55659-153-2.
- The Silk Dragon II: Translations of Chinese Poetry (Copper Canyon Press, 2024)

In anthology

- Tuckey, Melissa, ed. (2018). "After a New Moon". Ghost Fishing: An Eco-Justice Poetry Anthology. Athens, Georgia: University of Georgia Press. ISBN 978-0-8203-5315-9.

=== As editor ===
- Chinese Writers on Writing. Ed. Arthur Sze. (Trinity University Press, 2010).
