= Lost Roads Publishers =

- Founded: 1976
- Headquarters location: Arkansas
- Official website: lostroads.org

Lost Roads is a small press founded in 1976 in Arkansas by poet Frank Stanford. Its stated mission is to publish essential books in contemporary literature. After Stanford's death in 1978, editorship was assumed by poet C. D. Wright, whose book, Room Rented by a Single Woman (1977), had been the press's first release. Wright co-edited the press with poet Forrest Gander for many years. Susan Scarlata became the executive editor of the press in 2009.
