= Copper Canyon Press =

American independent non-profit literary publisher

- Founded: 1972; 54 years ago
- Country of origin: United States
- Headquarters location: Fort Worden; Port Townsend, Washington
- Distribution: Consortium Book Sales & Distribution
- Publication types: Books
- Fiction genres: Poetry
- Official website: coppercanyonpress.org

Copper Canyon Press is an independent, non-profit small press, founded in 1972 in Denver, Colorado by Sam Hamill, Tree Swenson, Bill O'Daly, and Jim Gautney, specializing exclusively in the publication of poetry. Since 1974, it has been located in Port Townsend, Washington, in what "looks like a small storage building".

With Hamill, the press's editor for over 30 years, departing in 2004, their team is currently led by Michael Wiegers and Ryo Yamaguchi, who joined in 1993 and 2024, and has previously included the likes of Tonaya Thompson as managing editor, George Knotek, Joseph Bednarik as marketing and sales director, and others. Bednarik also served as the poet Jim Harrison's editor at Copper Canyon Press. They publish new collections of poetry by both popular and emerging American poets, translations of classical and contemporary work from many of the world's cultures, re-issues of out-of-print poetry classics, prose books about poetry, and anthologies.

== Books ==
One of "the country's most respected and prestigious poetry presses", and a "pro", Copper Canyon Press achieved national attention with their publication of The Complete Poems of Kenneth Rexroth, edited by Sam Hamill and Bradford Morrow in 2003 and, two years later, when their poet W.S. Merwin won the 2005 National Book Award for Poetry in the same year another Copper Canyon poet, Ted Kooser, won the 2005 Pulitzer Prize for Poetry and was appointed to a second year as United States Poet Laureate. Merwin later won the 2009 Pulitzer Prize for Poetry and in 2010 was named United States Poet Laureate. Copper Canyon has published more than 400 titles, including works by the Nobel Prize laureates Pablo Neruda, Odysseas Elytis, Octavio Paz, Vicente Aleixandre and Rabindranath Tagore; Pulitzer Prize-winners Ted Kooser, Carolyn Kizer, Maxine Kumin, Theodore Roethke, and W.S. Merwin; National Book Award winners Hayden Carruth, Lucille Clifton, and Ruth Stone; and some contemporary poets and translators such as Jim Harrison, C. D. Wright, Bill Porter (aka Red Pine), Norman Dubie, Eleanor Wilner, Arthur Sze, James Richardson, Tom Hennen and Lucia Perillo. In 2003 it published the Complete Poems of Kenneth Rexroth.

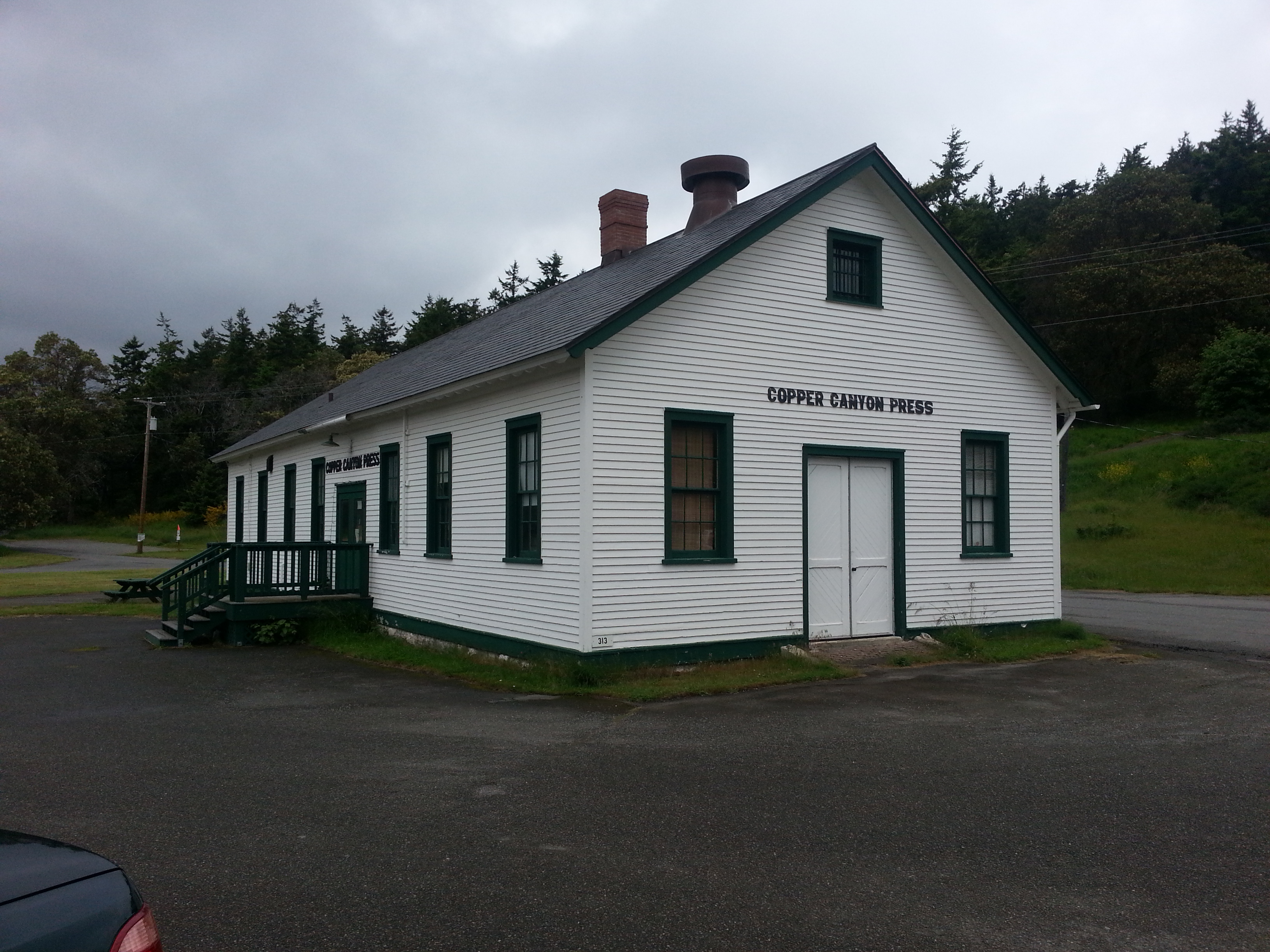
Building #313 at Fort Worden State Park in Port Townsend, Washington is the home of Copper Canyon Press.

The press published What About This: Collected Poems of Frank Stanford to great critical acclaim in 2015. In his New York Times review, Dwight Garner complimented the press for performing a "vital and difficult task" and giving the reader "a chance to see him (Stanford) whole." National Public Radio called the book's release "the big event in poetry for 2015."

Also in 2015, Copper Canyon Press acquired the U.S. rights to a manuscript of lost poems by the Nobel laureate Pablo Neruda. Discovered by archivists from The Pablo Neruda Foundation in the summer of 2014 just after the April 2013 exhumation of Neruda's body in Chile, this collection of poems has been called "a literary event of universal importance" and "the biggest find in Spanish literature in recent years". The collection, Then Come Back: The Lost Neruda Poems, translated by Pulitzer finalist Forrest Gander, was released in April 2016 and includes full-color, facsimile presentations of Neruda's handwritten poems. Copper Canyon was also awarded the rights to publish Neruda's first book, Crepusulario, which has also never appeared in the U.S. in English translation.

Natasha Rao's Latitude was the winner of the 2021 American Poetry Review/Honickman First Book Prize in Poetry. Jorie Graham's To 2040 was a 2024 Pulitzer Prize Finalist in Poetry, and Jennifer Chang's An Authentic Life in 2025. The poets Richard Siken and Gabrielle Calvocoressi were finalists for the 2025 National Book Award for Poetry, whereas Natalie Shapero was on the longlist for Stay Dead.

== Major prizes ==
- Jericho Brown – 2020 Pulitzer Prize for Poetry for The Tradition
- Arthur Sze – 2019 National Book Award for Poetry for Sight Lines
- Ocean Vuong – 2017 T. S. Eliot Prize for Night Sky with Exit Wounds
- Natalie Diaz – 2013 American Book Award for When My Brother Was an Aztec
- Laura Kasischke – 2011 National Book Critics Circle Award for Space, In Chains
- C.D. Wright – 2010 National Book Critics Circle Award for One With Others
- W.S. Merwin – 2009 Pulitzer Prize for Poetry for The Shadow of Sirius
- Ted Kooser – 2005 Pulitzer Prize for Poetry for Delights and Shadows
- W.S. Merwin – 2005 National Book Award for Poetry for Migrations: New and Selected Poems
- Ruth Stone – 2002 National Book Award for Poetry for In the Next Galaxy
- Hayden Carruth – 1996 National Book Award for Poetry for Scrambled Eggs & Whiskey
