= List of writers from Saskatchewan =

The Canadian province of Saskatchewan has produced writers across a wide variety of genres. This list includes notable writers who were born in Saskatchewan or spent a significant portion of their writing career living in Saskatchewan.

== A ==
- Janice Acoose (1954–2020)
- Howard Adams (1921–2001)
- Edward Ahenakew (1885–1961)
- Freda Ahenakew (1932–2011)
- Linda Aksomitis (born 1954), novelist, children's writer
- Edna Alford (born 1947), short story writer
- Ralph Allen (1913–1966), journalist, novelist
- Damien Atkins (living), playwright
- Faith Avis (1924–2010), journalist

== B ==
- Elizabeth Bachinsky (born 1976), poet
- Jacqueline Baker (living), novelist, short story writer
- Mary Balogh (born 1944), novelist
- Byrna Barclay (1940–2023)
- Molly Lyons Bar-David (1910–1987), journalist, cookbook writer
- Laakkuluk Williamson Bathory (born 1979), poet
- Ven Begamudré (born 1956), poet, short story writer, novelist
- Keith Behrman (born 1963), screenwriter
- Sheri Benning (living), poet
- Doris Bergen (born 1960), historian
- Sarah Bessey (born 1979), non-fiction writer
- Anthony Bidulka (born 1962), novelist
- Lisa Bird-Wilson (living), novelist, poet, short story writer
- Sandra Birdsell (born 1942), novelist, short story writer
- Martha Blum (1913–2007), novelist
- Gail Bowen (born 1942), playwright, novelist
- Lynne Bowen (born 1940), non-fiction writer
- Max Braithwaite (1911–1995), novelist, non-fiction writer
- Eleanor Brass (1905–1992)
- Lorna Brown (born 1958), non-fiction writer
- Della Burford (born 1946)
- Frank Christopher Busch (born 1978), novelist
- Sharon Butala (living), novelist

== C ==
- Alison Calder (born 1969), poet
- Robert Calder (living), non-fiction writer
- Maria Campbell (born 1939), novelist, playwright
- Marjorie Wilkins Campbell (1901–1986), novelist, non-fiction writer
- David Carpenter (born 1941), novelist, poet
- Sarah Carter (living), historian
- Allan Casey (living), travel writer, nature writer
- Eleanor Coerr (1922–2010), children's writer
- Layne Coleman (living), playwright
- Ramsay Cook (1931–2016), historian
- Dennis Cooley (born 1944), poet
- Archie Crail (born 1944), playwright, short story writer
- Roewan Crowe (living), poet
- Lorna Crozier (born 1948), poet
- Rachel Cusk (born 1967), novelist

== D ==
- Charlie David (born 1980), screenwriter
- Don DeBrandt (living), novelist
- William Deverell (born 1937), novelist
- Myrna Dey (living), novelist
- Don Dickinson (living), novelist, short story writer
- Claire Drainie Taylor (1917–2009), autobiographer
- Dave Dryburgh (1908–1948), sports journalist
- Dawn Dumont (living), novelist, short story writer

== E ==
- Marina Endicott (born 1958), novelist, short story writer
- Ann Eriksson (living)
- Michael Estok (1939–1989), poet

== F ==
- Karlene Faith (1938–2017), non-fiction writer
- Miguel A. Fenrich (born 2002), journalist, novelist
- Jen Ferguson (living), novelist
- Connie Fife (1961–2017), poet
- Allan Fotheringham (1932–2020), journalist
- Edith Fowke (1913–1996), folklorist
- Bevann Fox (living), non-fiction writer
- Gayleen Froese (born 1972), novelist
- Wes Funk (1969–2015), novelist

== G ==
- Richard Gabourie (1939–2004), screenwriter
- Connie Gault (born 1949), novelist, playwright, short story writer
- Tea Gerbeza (living), poet
- Tara Gereaux (born 1975), novelist
- David Gibbins (born 1962), novelist
- Joanna Glass (born 1936), playwright
- Glenda Goertzen (born 1967), novelist
- Carol Rose GoldenEagle (living), novelist, poet
- Michelle Good (living), novelist, poet
- Danis Goulet (born 1977), screenwriter
- Lee Gowan (born 1961), novelist
- Ethel Grayson (1890–1980), novelist, poet
- Dennis Gruending (born 1948), journalist, non-fiction writer
- Jan Guenther Braun (living), novelist

== H ==
- Louise Bernice Halfe (born 1953), poet
- Meredith Hambrock (living), novelist and television writer
- Marjorie Harris (born 1937), non-fiction writer
- Michael Helm (born 1961), novelist
- Lee Henderson (living), novelist, short story writer
- Trevor Herriot (living), nature writer
- Annie Hewlett (1887–1974), journalist, memoirist
- Douglas Hill (1935–2007), novelist
- Lois Hole (1929–2005), non-fiction writer
- Leah Horlick (living), poet
- Tara Hunt (living), non-fiction writer
- Maureen Hunter (born 1948), playwright

== J ==
- Harold R. Johnson (1954–2022), non-fiction writer
- S. D. Johnson (living), poet
- Sean Johnston (living), novelist, short story writer
- Harlo Jones (1923–2005), memoirist
- Terry Jordan (living), novelist, essayist

== K ==
- Guy Gavriel Kay (born 1954), novelist
- David Kesterton (born 1948), novelist
- Ross King (born 1962), novelist, non-fiction writer
- Roy Kiyooka (1926–1994), poet
- Barbara Klar (born 1966), poet
- Mors Kochanski (1940–2019), non-fiction writer
- Sarah Kramer (1968–2025), cookbook writer

== L ==
- Annette Lapointe (born 1978), novelist
- Andréa Ledding (living), non-fiction writer, playwright, poet
- Elliott Leyton (1939–2022), non-fiction writer
- Tim Lilburn (born 1950), poet, essayist
- Erwin Lutzer (born 1941), non-fiction writer
- C. P. Lyons (1915–1998), historian

== M ==
- Alistair MacLeod (1936–2014), novelist, short story writer
- Eli Mandel (1922–1992), poet
- Miriam Mandel (1930–1982), poet
- Yann Martel (born 1964), novelist
- Margaret McBurney (1931–2018), non-fiction writer
- Kyle McCulloch (born 1962), screenwriter
- Brendan McLeod (born 1979), novelist, poet
- Sally McKay (living), non-fiction writer
- Ron Miksha (born 1954), non-fiction writer
- Ken Mitchell (born 1940), poet, novelist, playwright
- W. O. Mitchell (1914–1998), novelist
- Mark Steven Morton (born 1963), non-fiction writer
- Farley Mowat (1921–2014), novelist, non-fiction writer
- Jasmin Mozaffari (living), screenwriter

== N ==
- H. Blair Neatby (1924–2018), historian
- John Newlove (1938–2003), poet
- Barbara Nickel (born 1966), poet
- Erik Nielsen (1924–2008), memoirist
- Yvette Nolan (born 1961), playwright
- Kenneth Norrie (born 1946), historian
- Suzanne North (born 1945), novelist

== O ==
- Denyse O'Leary (born 1950), non-fiction writer, journalist
- Delia Opekokew (living), non-fiction writer
- Bernard Ostry (1927–2006), non-fiction writer

== P ==
- Frank Peers (1918–2016), historian
- Erdman Penner (1905–1956), screenwriter
- James Penton (1932–2024), historian
- Len Peterson (1917–2008), novelist, playwright, screenwriter
- Leslie Hall Pinder (1948–2021), novelist, non-fiction writer

== Q ==
- James Quandt (living), historian

== R ==
- Brent Rathgeber (born 1964), non-fiction writer
- Monty Reid (born 1952), poet
- C. S. Richardson (born 1955), novelist
- Sandra Ridley (living), poet
- T. F. Rigelhof (born 1944), non-fiction writer, memoirist
- Erika Ritter (born 1948), playwright, essayist, humorist
- Gail Robinson (living), poet, novelist
- Sinclair Ross (1908–1996), novelist, short story writer

== S ==
- Ann Saddlemyer (born 1932), non-fiction writer
- Habeeb Salloum (1924–2019), food writer, cookbook writer
- Djanet Sears (born 1959), playwright
- Paul Seesequasis (living), journalist, novelist
- Valerie Sherrard (born 1957), novelist
- Morris C. Shumiatcher (1917–2004), non-fiction writer
- Hal Sigurdson (1932–2012), sports journalist
- Judith Silverthorne (born 1953), children's writer, non-fiction writer
- Arthur Slade (born 1967), novelist
- Karen Solie (born 1966), poet
- Cassie Stocks (born 1966), novelist
- Arthur G. Storey (1915–2005), novelist
- Gertrude Story (1929–2014), short story writer, poet
- Andrew Suknaski (1942–2012), poet
- Anne Szumigalski (1922–1999), poet

== T ==
- Cora Taylor (born 1936), novelist, short story writer
- Peter Tertzakian (born 1961), non-fiction writer
- Jesse Thistle (born 1976), non-fiction writer
- Rhea Tregebov (born 1953), poet, novelist, children's writer
- Chris Turner (born 1973), journalist, non-fiction writer
- Daniel Scott Tysdal (born 1978), poet

== U ==
- Geoffrey Ursell (1943–2021), playwright, novelist, poet

== V ==
- Guy Vanderhaeghe (born 1951), novelist, short story writer
- Vauhini Vara (living), journalist, non-fiction writer

== W ==
- Fred Wah (born 1939), poet, novelist
- Chris Walter (born 1959), novelist
- Tom Warner (born 1952), non-fiction writer
- Rudy Wiebe (born 1934), novelist, short story writer, non-fiction writer
- Clifford Wiens (1926–2020), poet
- Douglas Wilson (1950–1992), poet, novelist
- J. F. C. Wright (1904–1970), journalist, historian
- L. R. Wright (1939–2001), novelist

== Y ==
- Paul Yee (born 1956), historian, children's writer

== See also ==
- Culture of Saskatchewan
- List of writers from Alberta
- List of writers from Manitoba
- Lists of Canadian writers
