= J. Jill Robinson =

Canadian writer, editor and teacher (born 1955)

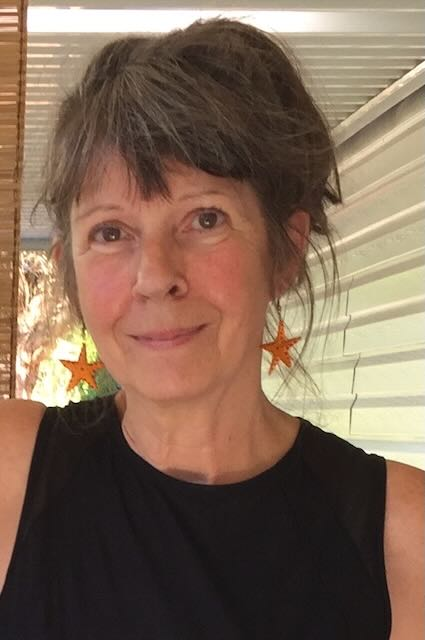
- Robinson in July 2021
- Born: June 16, 1955 (age 71); Langley, British Columbia, Canada
- Education: University of Alaska Fairbanks
- Occupations: Writer, editor.
- Writing career
- Period: 1991–present
- Genres: Fiction, Creative nonfiction
- Notable works: Saltwater Trees (1991); Lovely In Her Bones (1993); Eggplant Wife (1995); Residual Desire (2003); More in Anger (2012)

Jacqueline Jill Robinson (born June 16, 1955) is a Canadian writer and editor. She is the author of a novel and four collections of short stories. Her fiction and creative nonfiction have appeared in a wide variety of magazines and literary journals including Geist, the Antigonish Review, Event, Prairie Fire and the Windsor Review. Her novel, More In Anger, published in 2012, tells the stories of three generations of mothers and daughters who bear the emotional scars of loveless marriages, corrosive anger and misogyny.

Robinson has won numerous literary competitions including two Western Magazine Awards, two Saskatchewan Book Awards, two prizes for creative nonfiction from Event magazine, the PRISM international fiction contest and the Howard O'Hagan award for short fiction from the Writers' Guild of Alberta. Her novel and stories have also won critical acclaim for their vivid characters, spare writing and tragic themes that nevertheless convey humour and hope.

Robinson was appointed writer-in-residence at the Regina Public Library for 2020–2021. She was the 24th writer-in-residence at the Saskatoon Public Library during 2004–2005. From 1995 to 1999, she was editor of the literary magazine Grain, published quarterly by the Saskatchewan Writers' Guild. She has taught English literature and creative writing at the Universities of Calgary and Saskatchewan, at St. Peter's College in Muenster, Saskatchewan and at the First Nations University of Canada.

Robinson was married to the poet Steven Ross Smith (1999 to 2022) and is the mother of a son, Emmett H Robinson Smith, born in 1995. She lives on Galiano Island in the Canadian province of British Columbia.

== Making of a writer ==
J. Jill Robinson was born in Langley, British Columbia in 1955, but she also had family ties to Alberta. Her mother grew up in Calgary while her father, a doctor, was from Banff. In 1979, she moved to Calgary where she earned a Bachelor of Arts degree in drama and English literature as well as a Master's degree in 19th century American literature at the University of Calgary. Her Master's thesis was entitled, The circumferential vision: love and death in the poetry of Emily Dickinson.

In 1987, while attending the Banff Centre for the Arts, where she encountered writers from across the country, Robinson realized that she wanted to be a writer herself. From 1988 to 1991, she studied creative writing at the University of Alaska Fairbanks, with among others, Frank Soos and Peggy Shumaker, earning a Master of Fine Arts degree. "I was the only Canadian in a graduate program with just 12 students in it...and it was great," she told a reporter in 2004. She added that the program provided her with "a toolbox of skills and techniques" while giving her a chance to read a wide variety of American writers.

== Short story collections ==
=== Saltwater Trees ===
Robinson earned a Master of Fine Arts degree from the University of Alaska in 1990. Her MFA thesis consisted of writings that later became the basis for Saltwater Trees, her first collection of short stories published in 1991 when she was 36. The Writers' Guild of Alberta awarded Saltwater Trees its Howard O'Hagan prize for short fiction. Reviewer Mary Walters Riskin noted the book was a fine beginning to Robinson's career. "One of the most refreshing aspects of this collection is that so many of the 13 stories in Saltwater Trees rise out of the insanities, the batterings and the drudgeries of real life to end on notes of hope," Riskin wrote.

=== Lovely In Her Bones ===
I am always alone. Always thinking. In, and in, and in unto myself. I tell you, the world is the inside of my head.

– From Lovely In Her Bones by J. Jill Robinson.

In 1993, J. Jill Robinson published Lovely In Her Bones, a collection of 11 stories including "Finding Linette," co-winner of Event magazine's 1992 prize for creative nonfiction. Calgary journalist and author Ken McGoogan, who interviewed Robinson about the new book, described "Finding Linette" as a "technically sophisticated" story that "intercuts the straight-ahead tale of a family's Christmas gathering with memories—and conflicting versions—of the long-ago death of a child." Robinson warned, however, that although the story was based on "family mythology" and other stories in the book came from her own experience, they should not be read too literally. "People are using a more liberal definition of nonfiction," she said. "There's a lot more freedom of structure and angle. A lot more room for imagination."

Lovely In Her Bones received favourable reviews. The Globe and Mail critic John Doyle wrote that the stories were ones of "quiet self absorption" adding: "Fortunately, they are written in a clear, lucid prose and often attain a rhythm that saves them from static solipsism." He summed up the collection as "a mosaic of sharply observed events and incidents" calling it the "best type of short story collection" and adding: "At the close of the collection the mosaic has taken shape and stands as a radiant insight into the power of painful memories." The Globe's book editors listed Lovely In Her Bones as "among the books we couldn't put down in 1993."

In the Edmonton Journal, reviewer Valerie Compton pointed to Robinson's passage that begins, "I am always alone. Always thinking..." as evidence of both the strengths and weaknesses of Lovely In Her Bones. She called the stories "so pared down, so reduced to wistful contemplation that it is almost enervating. Almost, but not quite, because these stories depend for their effects on insights we might not achieve without spending a good long time inside a character's head."

=== Eggplant Wife ===
J. Jill Robinson moved from Calgary to Saskatoon in 1993 to join the writer, Steven Ross Smith whom she would later marry. In 1995, she published Eggplant Wife, a novella and short stories. The collection was shortlisted for the 1996 Saskatchewan Book Award. A review in the Edmonton Journal noted Robinson's "flair for domestic drama and detail. The plotting is almost incidental to the emotional states of the characters." The novella tells the story of a young couple who leave Vancouver to move into his parents' prairie farmhouse. Mitch had paid for his parents' trip to Hawaii where they were swept away by a wave. The eggplant of the title refers to a bowl of ceramic fruits and vegetables in the farmhouse kitchen.

In 1995, Robinson gave birth to her son Emmett. During her years in Saskatchewan, she also taught creative writing at St. Peter's College in Muenster as well as at the First Nations University of Canada.

Robinson served for four years, from 1995 to 1999, as editor of the quarterly literary magazine Grain: the journal of eclectic writing dividing her time between her own writing in the mornings and editing in the afternoons.

=== Residual Desire ===
In 2003, Robinson published Residual Desire, her fourth collection of short stories. The book captured two Saskatchewan Book Awards and earned praise from critics such as Verne Clemence. "The stories in this excellent collection are character-driven," he wrote. "The prose is spare and well crafted. The stories are edgy as befits the dark themes that drive them, but there is hope too, and more than one rueful laugh at those delightful foibles that mark us all as human."

A review in ForeWord magazine noted that Residual Desire is an "unsentimental examination" of women's lives. "Robinson's stories are dramatic and heart wrenching, but, impressively, there's nothing heavy-handed or unbelievable in her delivery," the review added. "Her characters probe the most vulnerable underbellies of their lives—lost loves, aging fathers, jealous sisterhoods—and push the reader to do the same."

I am generally a fan of sparely written prose; a character's suffering can be laid so bare the reader winces because she can't shy away.

– From a book review by J. Jill Robinson.

During an interview about Residual Desire, Robinson agreed that her work could be described as unsentimental and heart wrenching. "One of the things that gets me writing is sadness," she said. "When you're happy and joyful, you don't need so much to pick up a pen to try to fathom or understand life...If a story of mine helps somebody see that there's another way through a really difficult, or seemingly impossible situation, I feel good," she added. "That's one of the reasons I write." She told another journalist she was pleased with Residual Desire. "I'm happy with all of the stories," she said. "Each one of them is the best that I can make it."

Residual Desire includes "Deja Vu" a story commissioned by CBC Radio on the recommendation of Guy Vanderhaeghe, winner of two Governor General's Literary Awards. "It's about a woman who's on her way to the Coast stops in Calgary and on a whim, decides to visit her ex-husband," Robinson told a journalist. "It's about how memory works, and yearning for and re-visiting the things that have played an important part in your life."

From September 1, 2004, to May 31, 2005, Robinson served as the 24th writer-in-residence at the Saskatoon Public Library. In 2009, she and her family moved from Saskatoon to Banff, Alberta where she now lives.

== Debut novel ==
Robinson authored More In Anger, a novel published in 2012. It tells the stories of three women from an unhappy family beset by the corrosive anger passed on from one generation to the next. The novel is divided into three sections named after the unlucky Opal, her emotionally cold daughter Pearl and her troubled granddaughter Vivien. It opens in 1915 with Opal's marriage to a misogynistic lawyer whose coldness and cruelty toward his wife and daughters reverberates through succeeding generations in loveless marriages and broken relationships. The novel ends as Vivien struggles to break free from her family's legacy of anger so that her own daughter can escape its destructive cycle.

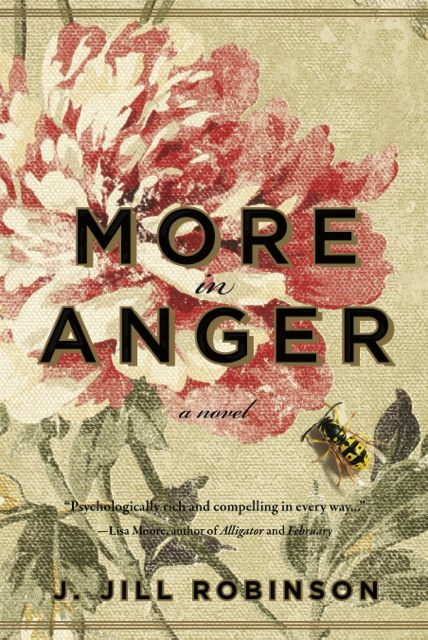

The idea for the novel came, Robinson says, after her son was born in 1995, the year she turned 40. "The combination of being 40 and then his being born made me start thinking about mortality and generations and legacies," she told a journalist. She added that along with physical traits such as red hair, families pass on less pleasant characteristics such as a tendency toward anger. "I wanted to explore what happens when a negative legacy is passed through generations and how it affects, not only the angry person, but the person around her or him: the children, the spouse. Although you can't do much about red hair, if that's what's running in your family, there is something you can do about emotional inheritance."

Robinson says she struggled with the novel for 10 years and found it frustrating trying to find "a sense of structure, or narrative thrust, to make it work." She adds that she found the novel much harder than writing short stories. "I'm a fairly organic writer, so I don't construct my stories. That works fine for short stories. But when you have hundreds of pages of material, it's really way harder to be organic about it." In 2003, she told another journalist that she preferred writing short stories. "I like the smaller, more intense, more narrow focus," she said. "I like to know where the edges are. You can move the boundaries by making the story longer or shorter, but you know where they are. Which isn't the case with the novel."

Initial critical reaction to Robinson's novel was mixed. A reviewer for The Globe and Mail observed: "Countless novels have been written about family dysfunction, but few so precisely capture verbal abuse and its long-lasting psychological effects...Character and the overt ways in which ridicule and mistreatment shape the psyche are where Robinson overwhelmingly succeeds." TheToronto Star, however, called the novel "relentlessly depressing" adding that Robinson "provides nothing uplifting or enlightening for her readers." A reviewer for the Winnipeg Free Press described More in Anger as a "compassionate" book "sombre yet gripping" adding that even though readers know from the beginning things won't turn out well, they "remain steadfastly horrified, fascinated and curious, all at the same time." While a reviewer for the Times Colonist called the novel's pacing "enjoyably swift," he felt two of the main characters were not fully drawn and that Robinson had not solved all of the technical problems in her transition from short story to novel writing. On the other hand, an online reviewer wrote that the strength of the novel lay in its "three-dimensional" characters adding that "Robinson writes about families and the love that both binds them together and tears them apart with a psychological insight that can make you cringe with recognition."

Robinson herself acknowledges that her novel is "bleak and dark and painful and unhappy." She adds that as a reader, she's more intrigued by stories like that than by ones about happiness. "I find it much more engaging to read about the struggle of the human condition. The search for love and search for fulfilment and search for meaning in life. All that is not lighthearted material."

== Influences ==
Robinson once explained that her artistic inspiration came from the American writer William Faulkner who believed that matters of the heart are the only things worth writing about. She has also said that she loves the intensity of short stories adding that Raymond Carver was one of her main influences. "I like the way Carver writes dialogue, the spareness, so that when he's writing about something painful, it can make you wince at how naked it is," Robinson told an interviewer. "There's no padding." Master short story writer, Alice Munro was another strong influence. "If I could write anything like Munro," she once said, "I would fall to my knees and praise the sky."

Robinson explains that her stories are based on personal experience, her own or someone she knows. "They begin with the truth," she says, "but as it changes into fiction, truth itself changes in order that it can do what is necessary for the story."

== Awards and honours ==
J. Jill Robinson's work has won a variety of awards including the PRISM international fiction contest; Event magazine's creative nonfiction contest (twice); two Gold Western Magazine awards; two Saskatchewan Book awards and the Howard O'Hagan Prize for short fiction.

She won an Honourable Mention in the National Magazine Awards for "The Letter," a piece of personal journalism. Her short story collection Lovely In Her Bones was on the Globe and Mail's top 100 books list for 1993. Residual Desire won a silver medal in ForeWord magazine's Book of the Year Awards in 2004. And, CBC Radio commissioned the story Deja Vu for broadcast in 1998.

== Bibliography ==
- Robinson, J. Jill. (1991) Saltwater Trees. Vancouver: Arsenal Pulp Press. ISBN 0-88978-241-5
- Robinson, J. Jill. (1993) Lovely In Her Bones. Vancouver: Arsenal Pulp Press. ISBN 0-88978-260-1
- Robinson, J. Jill. (1995) Eggplant Wife. Vancouver: Arsenal Pulp Press. ISBN 1-55152-024-9
- Robinson, J. Jill. (2003) Residual Desire. Regina: Coteau Books. ISBN 1-55050-265-4
- Robinson, J. Jill. (2012) More in Anger. Toronto: Thomas Allen Publishers. ISBN 978-0-88762-953-2
