= Dianne Warren =

Canadian novelist, dramatist and short story writer

- Born: August 28, 1950 (age 75); Ottawa, Ontario, Canada
- Occupation: Writer
- Spouse: Bruce Anderson
- Children: 2
- Writing career
- Notable works: Serpent in the Night Sky; Cool Water
- Website: www.diannewarrenauthor.com

Dianne Warren (born August 28, 1950) is a Canadian novelist, dramatist and short story writer.

== Background ==
Warren was born in Ottawa, Ontario. Her mother grew up on a farm in Saskatchewan and worked in Ottawa during the 1940s. Her father, a World War II veteran, was from a small lumber town in the Ottawa Valley. Her parents met in Ottawa after the war, married, had two babies, and then moved to Saskatchewan. Although the family travelled back to Ottawa every few years to visit that side of the family, the extended family that Dianne grew up with was her mother's family, who remain farm and ranch people. She spent as much time as possible with her grandparents on the farm and grew up loving the prairie landscape.

She studied art at university and graduated with a degree in Fine Arts. She continued writing during those years, although in isolation and without the benefit of mentors or writing friends. About the time that she turned thirty, she decided she needed to learn more about writing. She took some writing classes through the English Department at her local university, and met several published and emerging writers that remain friends and colleagues to this day. She was invited to join a writing group called The Bombay Bicycle Club and the diligence with which its members approached the art of literary critique set her on the path to becoming a published writer.

== Career ==
Warren's first short story was published in 1982 in the anthology Saskatchewan Gold. Her fiction has appeared in anthologies such as The Old Dance, Fire Beneath the Cauldron and Concrete Forest. Her short story collections include The Wednesday Flower Man (1987), Bad Luck Dog (1993) and A Reckless Moon (2002).

Her novel Cool Water (released as Juliet in August in the US) won the Governor General's Award for English fiction in Canada. It has been published in several countries since then, including France and Australia.

Her first book, The Wednesday Flower Man, was published in 1987 by the burgeoning Saskatchewan press Coteau Books. Two more story collections followed: Bad Luck Dog in 1993 and A Reckless Moon in 2002. She has a soft spot for Bad Luck Dog because it won the Saskatchewan Book of the Year Award about the same moment that Joe Carter hit the home run that won the Toronto Blue Jays the World Series. The room at the Saskatchewan Book Awards erupted in cheers (for Joe Carter).

She also wrote three stage plays in those years, all of which were produced by 25th Street Theatre in Saskatchewan. Her play Serpent in the Night Sky was short-listed for the Governor General's Award for drama in 1989. She no longer writes plays.

Her first novel Cool Water was published in 2010 in Canada and in 2012 in the US (as Juliet in August). She claims to have been working on this book her whole life since it is informed by the iconography of the western books and movies she grew up with, and the shadow of the past in the novel is, in a sense, her family's past.

On June 2, 2020 her latest novel, The Diamond House, was published.

== Personal life ==
Dianne lives in Regina, Saskatchewan with her husband, visual artist Bruce Anderson. They have two sons. Her hobbies are still reading and horses.

== Awards ==
Bad Luck Dog won three Saskatchewan Book Awards, including Book of the Year.

Warren also won the National Magazine Gold Award for Fiction and the Western Magazine Award for Fiction. She won the Writers' Trust Engel/Findley Award from the Writers' Trust of Canada in 2004.

She published her first novel, Cool Water, in 2010. The novel won the Governor General's Award for English-language fiction at the 2010 Governor General's Awards, and was also longlisted for the Giller Prize.

In 2021, she won the inaugural Glengarry Book Prize for her latest novel, The Diamond House. The award is presented by the Saskatchewan Foundation for the Arts.

Year	Work	Award	Category	Result	Ref
1992	Serpent in the Night Sky	Governor General's Awards	Drama in English	Shortlisted	
1993	Bad Luck Dog	Saskatchewan Book Award	Book of the Year	Won	
1993	Bad Luck Dog	Saskatchewan Book Award	Regina Book Award	Won	
1993	Bad Luck Dog	Saskatchewan Book Award	Spirit of Saskatchewan Award	Won	
1995	Club Chernobyl	Saskatchewan Book Award	Regina Book Award	Won	
2004	—	Writers' Trust Engel/Findley Award	—	Won	
2010	Cool Water	Governor General's Awards	Fiction in English	Won	
2010	Cool Water	Giller Prize	—	Longlisted	
2021	The Diamond House	Glengarry Book Award	—	Won	

== List of works ==
=== Plays ===
- Serpent in the Night Sky (1992)
- Club Chernobyl (1994)
- The Last Journey of Captain Harte (1999)

All three plays premiered at Twenty-Fifth Street Theatre and were all directed by Tom Bentley-Fisher. Warren also wrote several dramatic works for CBC Radio.

=== Fiction ===
- — (1987). The Wednesday Flower Man (1st ed. Paperback ed.). Coteau Books. ISBN 9780919926684.
- — (1993). Bad Luck Dog (1st ed. Paperback ed.). Coteau Books. ISBN 9781550500479.
- — (2002). A Reckless Moon and Other Stories (Paperback ed.). Raincoast Books. ISBN 9781551924557.
- — (2010). Cool Water (1st ed. Hardcover ed.). HarperCollins Canada. ISBN 9781554685585.
- — (2015). Liberty Street (1st ed. Hardcover ed.). HarperCollins. ISBN 9781554685608.
- — (2020). The Diamond House (1st ed. Paperback ed.). HarperCollins. ISBN 9781443445108.
