= Brass (disambiguation) =

Brass is a metal alloy of copper and zinc.

Brass may also refer to:

== Arts and culture ==
- Brass, brass instruments, musical instruments usually made of brass; or the part of an orchestra composed of players of those instruments
- Brass band, a type of musical ensemble
- Brass, a novel by Helen Walsh
- Brass (album), an album by Minibosses
- Brass (board game), a board game set in England during the industrial revolution
- Brass (film), a 1923 silent film romance
- Brass (TV series), a 1980s British television series starring Timothy West

== Geography ==
- Brass, Nigeria, a local government area in Bayelsa State, Nigeria
  - Twon-Brass, a town in Nigeria, head of the Brass local government area
  - Brass Island, island in Nigeria, site of Twon-Brass

== People with the surname ==
- Chris Brass (born 1975), English footballer
- Daniel J. Brass (born ca. 1948), American organizational theorist
- Eleanor Brass (1905–1992), Canadian writer
- John Brass, rugby player
- John Brass (colliery manager)
- John Brass (writer)
- Jim Brass, a character on the television series CSI: Crime Scene Investigation
- Leonard John Brass (1900–1971), Australian botanist
- Otto Brass (1875–1950), German politician
- Paul Brass (1936–2022), American political scientist
- Steffani Brass (born 1992), American actress
- Tinto Brass (1933–2026), Italian filmmaker

== Other ==
- "Brass", military slang for officers, especially high-ranking ones with broad decision-making powers.
- "Brass", senior management in companies and other organizations.
- "Brass", English slang term for money, i.e. "brass in pocket"; as well as effrontery and in an alternative context, also slang for a prostitute
- "Brass", the metallic body of a cartridge case, usually made of brass

== See also ==
- Horse brass, a plaque used to decorate shire horses
- Monumental brass, commemorative plates laid down in British and European churches
