= Saskatoon Public Library =

The Saskatoon Public Library is a publicly funded library system in Saskatoon, Saskatchewan, Canada. It is available for use by any member of the public; library cards are free for all Saskatonians. Saskatoon Public Library was established in 1913.

== Branches ==
Saskatoon Public Library has nine branches across Saskatoon.

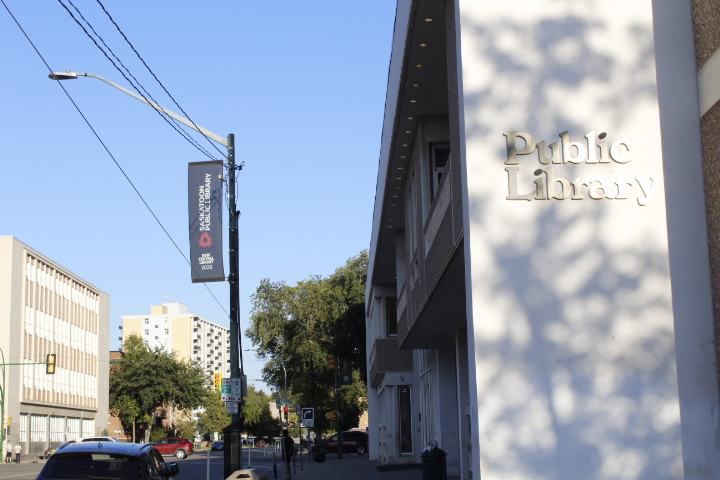

=== Frances Morrison Library ===
The Frances Morrison Central Library is located at 311 – 23rd Street East in downtown Saskatoon. It officially opened on May 28, 1966. This facility was named after Frances Morrison, who served as SPL’s chief librarian from 1961 to 1980. The Frances Morrison Central Library is the largest of SPL’s nine libraries and houses a dedicated Children’s Department, Fine Arts Department, Local History Room, Theatre, a computer lab and various administration offices, SPL’s Outreach & Access Services, Information Services, Fiction Services and Teen Services departments.

=== Alice Turner Library ===
The Alice Turner Branch is located at 110 Nelson Road. The current facility replaced the smaller Sutherland Branch in December 1998. It was renamed after Alice Turner McFarland who was a library employee for 37 years and chief librarian from 1981 to 1989. The first library in Canada to be built to the standards of C-2000 construction, Canada's environmental building code, Alice Turner Branch was expanded to double its original size in 2013.

=== Carlyle King Library ===
The Carlyle King Branch is located at 3130 Laurier Drive. It officially opened October 16, 1979 and is currently located in the Cosmo Civic Centre. Carlyle King Branch was the first branch library to be part of a multi-purpose facility in Saskatoon. The branch was named in honour of Carlyle King who, in addition to a distinguished academic career, was actively involved in the Saskatchewan Library Advisory Council, the Saskatchewan Library Association and the Saskatoon Public Library Board (1955-1972).

=== Cliff Wright Library ===
The Cliff Wright Branch is located at 1635 McKercher Drive. The Lakewood Library relocated when the Lakewood Civic Centre opened in October, 1988. The branch was officially opened on January 9, 1989, and was renamed after former mayor, Cliff Wright, on March 30, 1989.

=== J.S. Wood Library ===
The J.S. Wood Branch is located at 1801 Landsdowne Ave. It opened in 1961 and is named after James Stuart Wood, who was born in England in 1891 and worked as a college librarian before enlisting in the British Army. He came to Canada with his family in 1925, teaching in Nipawin and Prince Albert before taking the role of Chief Librarian at SPL in 1938.

=== Dr. Freda Ahenakew Library ===
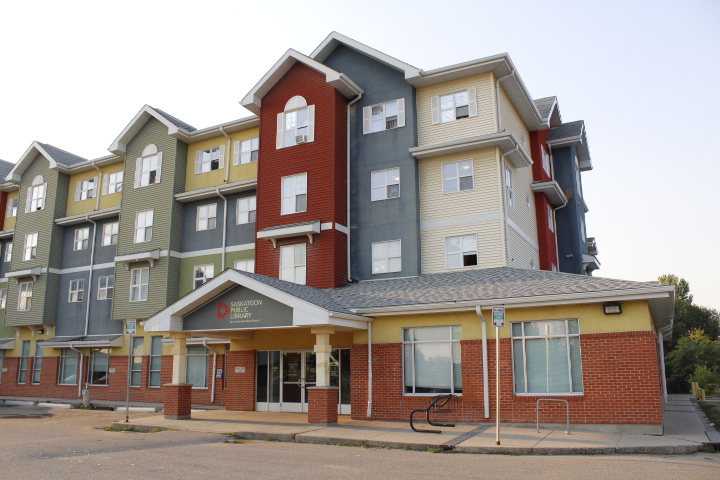

The Dr. Freda Ahenakew Library, located in the Station 20 West complex, was originally known as the Library on 20th Street. In December 2016, the Saskatoon Public Library (SPL) announced that the branch would be renamed to honor Dr. Freda Ahenakew, a Cree scholar and language preservationist who made significant contributions to Indigenous language revitalization.

The renaming followed consultations with local Indigenous leaders and was part of the library's commitment to the Truth and Reconciliation Commission's Calls to Action, which emphasize the importance of recognizing Indigenous history and contributions. A naming ceremony was held on February 10, 2017, attended by community members, library officials, and Ahenakew’s family.

Dr. Ahenakew’s work in documenting and revitalizing the Cree language is widely recognized, and the library's renaming serves as a lasting tribute to her legacy.

=== Mayfair Library ===
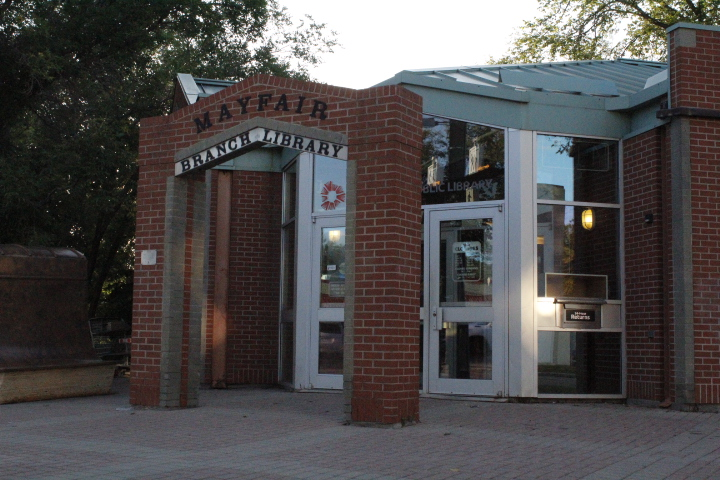

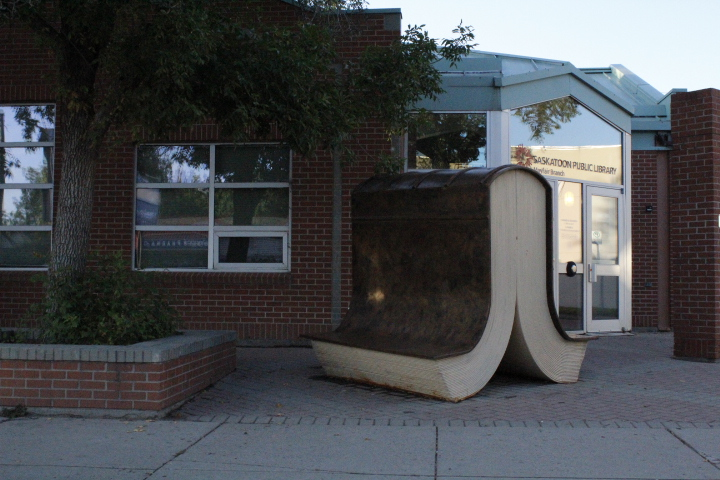

The Mayfair Branch is located at 602 – 33rd Street West. The original Mayfair Branch Library was established in 1952 in the basement of the Mayfair Community Hall. By 1989, the building was no longer suitable for the library and the basement location presented accessibility problems. The Mayfair Branch was reopened in 1991, on the same site, after a one-year break in service during construction.

=== Rusty Macdonald Library ===
The Rusty Macdonald Branch is located at 225 Primrose Drive. It opened in 1989, as part of the Lawson Civic Centre, a multipurpose facility also housing a wave pool, weight room and exercise room. It is named after R. H. "Rusty" Macdonald, journalist, author, photographer and dedicated library trustee (1960-1981).

=== Round Prairie Library ===
The Round Prairie Branch is located at 170 – 250 Hunter Road. The branch was named in honour of the La Prairie Round (or Round Prairie) Métis, who were a community of buffalo hunters that established a wintering site near Dakota Whitecap in the late 1800s. In the 1920s and 1930s many in the community were forced to migrate to Saskatoon in search of work, and by the 1940s they had established a permanent and close knit community near the current site of the new SPL branch.

== Central Library construction ==
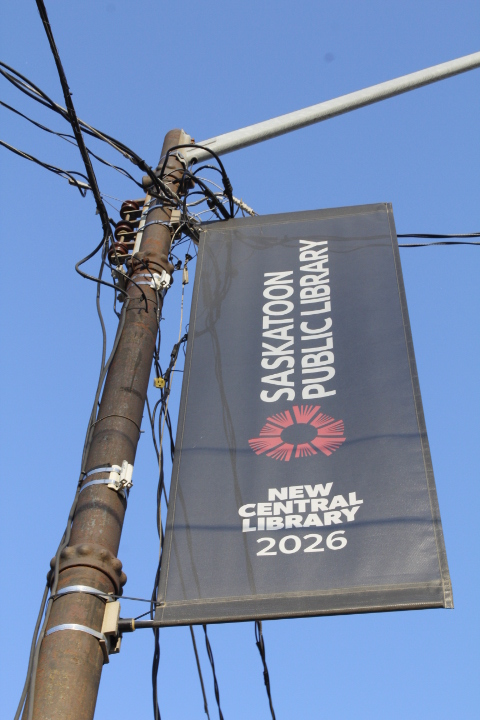

The Saskatoon Public Library (SPL) began construction of its new central library in 2024, marking a significant step towards enhancing access to modern library services in the city. Located at 321 2nd Avenue North, the new library is designed to serve Saskatoon’s growing community by providing a state-of-the-art facility focused on learning, innovation, and cultural engagement. The library is expected to open in 2027.

The 120,000-square-foot building's design is inspired by Indigenous cultures, featuring a Plains First Nations tipi-inspired exterior and a Métis log cabin-style interior. The facility is also designed with sustainability in mind, aiming to achieve LEED Gold certification and Rick Hansen Foundation Accessibility Certification.

The project, with an estimated cost of $134 million, is funded by municipal contributions and community fundraising. Initial budget constraints led to design adjustments, but construction remains on schedule, with the library expected to open by mid-2027.

== Writers in residence ==
The Writer in Residence program at the library is co-funded by the Canada Council for the Arts.

- Anne Szumigalski
- Patrick Lane
- Guy Vanderhaeghe
- Geoffrey Ursell
- Joe Rosenblatt
- Gertrude Story
- Lois Simmie
- Glen Sorestad
- Samuel Selvon
- Candace Savage
- Sean Virgo
- Armin Wiebe
- Betsey Warland
- Robert Minhinnick
- Sandra Birdsell
- Steven Ross Smith
- Harry Rintoul
- Elisabeth Harvor
- John Livingstone Clark
- Edna Alford
- Dave Margoshes
- Myrna Kostash
- Yann Martel
- J. Jill Robinson
- Jeanette Lynes
- Curtis Peeteetuce
- Yvette Nolan
- David A. Poulsen
- Dee Hobsbawn-Smith
- Arthur Slade
