= Joey Huertas =

American experimental filmmaker, sound artist and forensic social worker

- Occupations: Filmmaker and sound artist, forensic social worker
- Website: janepublic.com

Joey Huertas (also known as Jane Public) is an American experimental film and sound artist working in a form he calls "docufessional," combining personal cinema, live performance, spoken word, and short stories. He also works for New York State as a forensic social worker.

== Biography ==
=== Early life and music ===
In his late teens, Huertas played drums in Killing Cycle, a high school thrash metal band with guitarist Mark Morton, later of Lamb of God, and singer Chris Marrow, a childhood friend of Morton's. The band performed at local venues and recorded demos in the late 1980s, including four original songs at a studio Morton found. In his memoir Desolation: A Heavy Metal Memoir, Morton describes Huertas as a prolific lyricist who kept notebooks of stories and offbeat lyrics marked by a dark sense of humor, and recalls that their song "Landslide Suicide" was an anti-drug song loosely inspired by a family friend of Huertas's who had died of an overdose. The band dissolved when Marrow enlisted in the Marines, and Morton and Huertas left for college.

=== Education ===
Huertas holds a Bachelor of Fine Arts from the State University of New York at Purchase's Conservatory of Theatre Arts and Film, and a master's degree from the Hunter College School of Social Work.

=== Film and performance work ===
Huertas's work includes shorts, installations, soundscapes, and film-related performances. His docufessional approach combines direct and observational documentary techniques with narrative storytelling.

His film Homewrecka, an experimental documentary about domestic violence, screened at the Syracuse International Film Festival in October 2010, where it was among the festival's award winners, and where festival director Owen Shapiro called Huertas a "genius".

Huertas was executive director of the Millennium Film Workshop from 2015 to 2022. He is listed as executive director in the Spring 2019 issue of the Workshop's Millennium Film Journal. From 2017 to 2019, he organized the Workshop's open-screening program in rented spaces under the name "HIJACK Open Screenings". In February 2022, Huertas was among the Millennium Film Workshop members who worked with MoMA curator Ron Magliozzi to organize New York City Symphonies of the Millennium Film Workshop, a film series marking MoMA's acquisition of the Millennium Film Workshop and Howard Guttenplan Collections. Joe Wakeman succeeded him as executive director in 2022.

In January 2025, CineSalon Online named Huertas its second CineSalon Online Artist, one of six artists featured in its annual awards.

=== Ann Rule and Ted Bundy research ===
In 2004, as a graduate student at the Hunter College School of Social Work, Huertas recorded his videotaped interview with true crime author Ann Rule about her book The Stranger Beside Me, her account of her friendship with the serial killer Ted Bundy, whom she met before his crimes were known.

He also interviewed Bundy's mother, Louise Bundy. In Cathy Scott's biography of Rule, First Lady of Murder, Huertas says Louise Bundy was hurt that Rule, who lived in the same region and updated The Stranger Beside Me through several later editions, had never reached out to her.

Huertas was credited as "Featured Expert & Archivist" in the 2025 French documentary Un tueur si proche : Ann Rule et Ted Bundy, released in English as The Stranger Beside Me: Ann Rule and Ted Bundy, co-directed by Julien Gaurichon and Frédéric Bas and produced by GoGoGo Films and ARTE France.

== Filmography ==
- 330.20 (2006)
- Nice People (2008)
- Homewrecka (2010)
- Missing Green (2011)
