= Adeline's Dream =

2006 novel by Linda Aksomitis

- First edition cover
- Author: Linda Aksomitis
- Language: English
- Series: From Many Peoples
- Genre: Young adult novel and Realistic Fiction
- Publisher: Coteau Books
- Publication date: 2006
- Publication place: Canada
- Media type: Print (Paperback)
- Pages: 209 pp
- ISBN: 1-55050-323-5
- OCLC: 61216764

Adeline's Dream is the first installment of the realistic fiction novel series From Many Peoples, written by Linda Aksomitis. It was first published by Coteau Books in 2006.

It follows the story of Adeline Mueller, who tries to adapt to her new life in Canada with her father, mother and younger brother.

== Plot summary ==
The narrative follows twelve-year-old Adeline Mueller as she moves with her mom and five-year-old brother to Canada from their German home to move in with her father to start a new life. Adeline has not seen her father since she was eight and she is expecting a great and wonderful life in Canada from the description in the letters she has received from her father. But Adeline's relationship with her father has been strained ever since he left her and the rest of the family to move to Saskatchewan. Her father worked in a bank in Germany and then, after being fired, decided to find a better life for the rest of the family in Saskatchewan. Finally Adeline's father had reported that he has started a splendid new life for the family. The book begins with Adeline, her mother, and her brother Konrad traveling by steamship and then by train from Germany to Saskatchewan. The family then arrives at Qu'Appelle. When Adeline arrives, the truth is revealed.

Adeline's father now works on a farm bagging flour and doing the accounts which does not make enough money to provide a home. So the family lives in a soddle made of grass and earth. All her life Adeline had dreamed that one day she would be a singer but she feels that because her father has brought her into these horrible conditions, that her dream will be ruined making their relationship even more strained. Adeline soon learns that the richer townspeople do not take kindly to the immigrants that move to the area. But through all the prejudice, Adeline makes two friends, Kat and Henery, who are also immigrants. Kat helped Adeline fight off prejudiced bullies at their school.

One day the farm where her father was employed is burned down and her father is forced to get a new job. Kat's family moves and Adeline is left to fight the bullies, especially a girl named Sarah: a girl who sings just like Adeline and takes her solo in the Christmas play. By the time of the play, Adeline has begun to get along with her father and Sarah allows Adeline to have the solo at the play and Adeline's dreams start to come true.

== Reception ==
In Prairie Fire, Donna Gamache writes: "Young readers will empathize with Adeline's resentment and struggles to accept her new home and in turn to be accepted. Adult readers will enjoy the story but will also admire the writing."

In a review for CM, Ruth Latta, writes: "Linda Aksomitis demonstrates considerable skill in constructing this novel."

The School Library Journal's review of Adeline's Dream states: "Readers who enjoy historical fiction will be served well by this title."

In Children's Literature 's review of Adelines Dream says: "a heart warming story about learning to adapt."
