= John Lent =

Canadian poet and novelist

John Lent is a Canadian poet and novelist, as well as a college teacher of creative writing and literature. He has published ten books from 1978 to 2012. His book, So It Won't Go Away, was shortlisted for the 2006 Ethel Wilson Fiction Prize. Lent's fiction and poetry have appeared for years in magazines across Canada, including: The Malahat Review, Event, Dandelion, Grain, The Wascana Review, NeWest Review, Prairie Fire, CV2, New Quarterly, Waves, Matrix, The Fiddlehead, and The Antigonish Review. Lent has read from his work in many cities in Canada, and internationally. Lent has also published critical articles on the work of Malcolm Lowry, Thomas DeQuincey, Wyndham Lewis, Tom Wayman, Kristjana Gunnars, Mavis Gallant, Dennis Brutus and Wilfred Watson.

"My continuing interest," Lent says, "is the relationship between consciousness and notions of 'narrative' in both fiction and poetry. So I'm fascinated by what happens when you take a person in a very ordinary, textured world and the story that surfaces actually mimics the process of awareness that is right at the heart of that world...so it's this wonderful, crazy mix of subjectivity and things that keeps drawing me to more open, more flexible forms of story. I find that whole process nervy and exciting."

Lent is also a singer-songwriter and plays in a roots/jazz trio, The Lent/Fraser/Wall Trio, which performs in British Columbia, and has opened for groups as various as Leahey, Chilliwack, Campbell Ryga, Long John Baldry, UHF and others. John Lent lives with his wife, Jude Clarke (painter and writer) in Vernon, British Columbia. Lent is a member of the Writers Union of Canada, SOCAN, the Canadian Songwriters Association, and the Associated Writing Programs (USA).

== Biography ==
John Lent was born on July 8, 1948, in Antigonish, Nova Scotia. He is the son of Harry and Adrienne (Brown) Lent and is one of seven siblings (Susan, Michael, Harry, Francis, Timothy, Mary-Lou). Lent married the painter Jude Clarke in 1981. Educated at the University of Alberta, B.A. (with honors), 1969, M.A., 1971, where he was a student of Sheila Watson, Lent pursued doctoral studies at York University, 1971–1975, including field work in British Columbia, on Malcolm Lowry and Spatial Form.

Prior to joining Okanagan College, Lent taught at the University of Regina, Saskatchewan, and Notre Dame University College in Nelson, British Columbia. Starting in 1979, he taught creative writing and literature courses at Okanagan College in Vernon, British Columbia. He retired from the position of Dean, North Okanagan Region, Okanagan College, in April 2011. He was influential in the creation of the Ryga Award for Social Responsibility in Canadian Literature, Ryga a Journal of Provocations, the Mackie Lecture and Reading Series, the Kalamalka Press, KIdsWWwrite (a creative writing ezine) and the KIWW Digital Archives, as well as several radio programs and newsprint collaborations such as The Kalamalka Chronicles. John Lent's participation in and authoring of the opening chapter of the, initially, serialised Kalamalka Chronicles, a community writing project initiated by The Sun Review newspaper and the Kalamalka Institute for Working Writers, emphasises the degree to which he experiments with narrative form and authorship. In this instance, the characters and their opening maneuvers were controlled by Lent, then re-authored and re-plotted by eight other writers. That the 'contest' was quite lively and that the newspaper folded after the publication of chapter nine is, perhaps, indicative of a community of writers rather than readers. In addition to these services to the literary arts and promotion of quality writing, Lent has engendered careers in writing through his work as a teacher and as an editor. He was a writer in residence at Sage Hill, Saskatchewan from 2009 to 2011. Lent reads his work in many cities in Canada, the United States, France, and England. He is a founding member of the Kalamalka Press, the Kalamalka Institute for working writers, and the annual Mackie Lecture and Reading series at Okanagan College. Lent is also a singer-songwriter and played in the roots/jazz trio Lent Fraser Wall.

Lent lives in Vernon, British Columbia, where he has finished revising a novel, The Path to Ardroe, a multi-voiced narrative set in Vernon, Strasbourg and the Scottish highlands, scheduled for publication in Spring 2012. He is also at work on a sequence of essays on consciousness and form, covering, among others, the writings of DeQuincey, Gunnars and Lowry.

Other biographical information is available in Jude Clarke's The Language of Water.

== Critical response ==
John Lent is an academic, essayist, poet, short story writer and musician. His work is marked by a mixing of genres that aims to produce a literary equivalent of jazz music. Lent also draws on art (especially the Impressionists) and has been influenced by the pioneering work of Joseph Frank in spatial form.

A Rock Solid plays off the various senses of the term rock: geological, musical, and etymological, with emphasis on its derivation from the Old High German rucken: "to cause to move". The term solid relates to the Cubist-influenced geometric structure, an insight prompted by the epigraph from Albert Gleizes and Jean Metzinger's Du Cubisme (1912). Combined, the "rock solid" signposts an emphasis on fluidity and stasis. The title's indefinite article foregrounds this rock solid as one petite narrative among many; that is, the structure and sense are not a univocal, universalising "truth". The relationship between words and painting, tied to the acoustic suggestion in the volume's title, stress the poet's inter-related concerns with a totality of experience. A Rock Solid "has captured a sense of experimentation with form [...] It is rare in literature for a reader to have a glimpse of the poet chipping through the rock solid of experience in order to see the poem" (Meyer, 88–90). Meyer's sole review of the book also comments on its packaging and how the reader is "sorting through a pile of debris". This comment underlines the reader's engagement, where sorting through the cards enforces reflection upon the experience and the reading process.

Wood Lake Music continues the emphasis on landscape, but a greater sense of mood is evoked. In tune with the sense of foreboding, the narrator's consciousness penetrates day-to-day rituals of renewal. The narrative employs a simple plot—the protagonist's drive (from Vernon) past Kalamalka Lake, then Wood Lake, and finally Duck Lake and into Kelowna. Temporal structure runs from "Monday, September 8, 3:30 pm" through "Monday, October 13, 7:00 am; 1:00 pm" Time represents the specific chronological frame of the trips, while their incremental repetition offers an accretion of being in place.

In subsequent writing (Frieze and The Face in the Garden), Lent loosens his aesthetic through the application of lessons taken from Joseph Frank's concept, spatial form, as well as its deconstructive developments—in particular the emphasis on space/place. Reviews of Frieze have been positive. Andrew Vasius, for example, applauds Lent's use of "end-line, internal, vowel and consonant rhyme for his own designs. The effect is not, as one might think, poetic conservatism, since he creates new forms through rhythmic change-ups, diction, caesura and sustained imagery" (110). Yet Vasius is critical of what he perceives to be "some poems [that] are so self-centred they leave a fleeting impression that Lent is translating experience into poetry" (110) rather than vice versa. Further to this claim, Vasius contends that the "'how' is exciting [...] whereas the 'what' is often only as new and unusual as the coffee, cigarettes and booze" (110) that punctuate these poems. Christopher Wiseman differs from Vasius in Wiseman's recognition of the regional place and the vernacular that is attendant to it: "The poems are rooted in real places, but these are turned into places of the mind, way-stations of the migrant heart, touchstones in the poet's search for meaning. The search is intensified by the tonal range of the poetry, from the high serious to the most colloquial, blended smoothly and always at the poet's service" (190). Michael Estok presses further, highlighting a motif in Lent's aesthetic: "Primarily, however, Lent is an artist of the 'negative space' of unadorned day-to-day existence. The stress of his rhythms is clearly on the banal, rather than on the sensational [...] The poet's careful structure of imagery and his muscular tone—his powerful expression of the hypnotic rhythm of the ordinary—elicit our confidence in his ability to redeem the commonplace" (9). Cheryl Sutherland, in a fine, close reading of several poems, evokes the volume's core: "he finds precision satisfying [and so] the task he has taken upon himself is to release the petrified voices of those who have lacked the vocabulary; he fashions a frieze from their silence" (Sutherland, np).

The Face in the Garden explores subjectivity by using prose and poetry to refer to external and internal states of consciousness. The author's linguistic dexterity underscores the sense of mobility as a theme in life and in literature. The volume is, however, a transitional moment in the writer's career. On the one hand it presents his first published stories; while, on the other, it consolidates his accomplishments as a poet. Reviews of this experimental book range from the journalistic boorishness of John Moore to academic criticism. Elizabeth St. Jacques, in Freelance, sees the work as the story of Peter Bendy, wherein "Boredom [...] has become his companion enemy that follows him on the long search to find his own 'face in the garden' of life" (38). St. Jacques faults the weakness of Bendy's character, the prose stories, that "come across as mini-lectures" and applauds the poetry, where "Lent allows his sensitivity and calm spirit to surface" (38). Professor R. G. Moyles concentrates on the title, offering an explication of "face" as many and "garden" as metaphor for life. He views "Towards the Gardens" as about "family upbringing and its emotional energy", while "In the Gardens" and "Facing the Gardens" present "physical and psychical" (n.p.) terrain. John Le Blanc's review is the most considered, though readers are likely to find room for argument with his conclusion: "[T]he shift to poetry in the last third of the work [exchanges] an analyzing consciousness [with] a verse that, in its imagistic terseness, is more coldly remote than engagingly elemental" (180). While there is much to agree with in Le Blanc's piece, the shift to poetry, far from being remote, is an imagistic expression that complements the analyzing consciousness. The point is not body versus mind, but rather body and mind—a fusion and a 'return' to that originary garden, Eden, where humans could be.

Monet's Garden is a discontinuous narrative of asymmetrical structure – an interweaving of connected stories with elliptical, interconnected pieces on the narrator of the book. The injection of a jazzy structure forcefully creates a three-dimensional literary space, perhaps at the expense of character, while in Black Horses, Cobalt Suns and Home (a poetic broadsheet, 2003), the poet opens out to societal concerns. The reviews are plentiful and consistently positive for Monet's Garden, Lent's major prose achievement prior to the publication of So It Won't Go Away. For example, Britt Hagarty writes of the "many descriptive passages worthy of quotation" (G6). Hagarty also notes that the book "succeeds powerfully at first. But its initial promise is not kept" (G6). Allan Brown perceptively parallels Monet's Garden "both of intention and general effect, to his poetry collection Wood Lake Music". Thematically, Brown observes: "There is some sadness in the new book with its tactful yet poignant descriptions of the ravages of alcoholism and the uncertain emotional relationships of an over-extended family. But there are moments of secure joy as well: moments, rather, that isolate, emphasize, and partly recreate a repeated joyfulness, often caught up in the perception of things." In his review of five new BC books, Brown concludes that, comparatively, "Lent has probably come closest of all these authors to what Charles Lillard [...] called 'a coming-to-terms with the landscape'—of B.C., or anywhere else." Dallas Harrison's observations are similar, though high praise of Lent's descriptive power is forthcoming in Harrison's summary of Jane's narrative as "a crisis of selfhood in London worthy of Antoine Roquentin in Jean-Paul Sartre's Nausea" (113). Harrison misses the point with respect to the Roof sequence when he suggests their deletion, "abstract meditations that add little to the portrait of the family" (113); however, he rightly notes that "[t]hese autobiographically influenced stories suffer somewhat from John Lent's controlling consciousness, evident in the similarity of characters [...]" (113). Valerie Compton's review in The Edmonton Journal displays the inattentiveness of the reviewer, especially to the book's structural experiment. See McLuckie's review for a contrasting perspective. Susan Patrick's capsule review emphasises the predominantly "psychological" nature of the stories, while also joining the chorus of reviewers who applaud Lent's "strong sense of place [that] has the ability to put the reader into both the emotional and physical landscapes of his characters" (3123).

Black Horses, Cobalt Suns: new poems is John Lent's sixth published book, his fourth of poetry. Based on revisions to a "sonnet cycle" completed in 1995, this chapbook contains the original twelve poems reworked as ten free verse lyrics, with a reflective "prologue". The new edition incorporates a governing epigraph from Robert Kroetsch's The Crow Journals (1980). "Abandonment" is the catalyst, where "People without names" is the thematic core (i.e., to exist outside the rational labelling consciousness). The question governs Lent's investigation of self in place. Historically, the sonnet cycle has some provenance in a varied number of poems governed by an intellectual pattern. The question posed in the epigraph is that pattern, with a movement from loss and depression to a slow renewal of an expressive vision and cautious hope. For Lent, cultural critique is central to the cycle, as his "Prologue" makes clear. Lent sees the horses as a metaphor for human (dis)connectedness: "hooves thundering through the reader's veins, racing over the planet with a passion that is out of us, sometimes turned against itself, sadly". The second metaphor, also foregrounded in the title, is the representation of place: "In the summer here in the Okanagan [...] there is a shade of cobalt blue that can be so intense it's overwhelming, and you get this gold and silver of the sun shredding it, shattering it, burnishing it, as it goes down." The interconnection of the horses moving out to meet the in-coming sun creates a crease, a physical epiphany that assures humanity is in the right place.

So It Won't Go Away, the follow-up to Monet's Garden, dazzles with its open, looser structure, inviting the reader—as do each of Lent's works by different means—to an engaged participation in text and in life. Devastating critiques of late capitalism, with an attendant and demonstrable human agency, bring the writer's aesthetic, calmly, quietly, forcefully to fruition. Cherie Thiessen writes that "The short stories in So It Won't Go Away are not plot-driven narratives. Instead they flip around in time, place and point of view, incorporating first, second and third-person perspectives. Lent's dozen stories get as close to three-dimensional writing as is possible." Paul Denham, notes the struggle a critic faces with the book and labels but also sees that struggle as an impediment "from its real emotional power of a story (or series of stories, if you prefer) about the joy and pain of being a family." Two reviews in The Globe and Mail concentrate on structure and theme. Wiersema places emphasis on structure: "Interestingly, the creator never creates a position of privilege for himself; his story is as fictive, and as truthful-feeling, as the "bigger, impossible story" of the Connelly siblings, and becomes another strand in the complex and utterly winning tale Lent is spinning." While Sandborn offers a thematic overview: "The book works both as a straightforward story of family pain, addiction, love and redemption, and as a highly intelligent meditation on the process of writing itself."

Lent's recent novel, The Path to Ardroe (2012) embodies Lent's interests in jazz, being, consciousness, landscape and the self. The thematic core is, for lack of better phrasing, a spiritual existentialism—how a human can just be in the world. Another way to cast the theme and, in several respects, the approach may be likened to the following: "It is, of course, an operation to unblock the heart but a tricky one, where you have to go in through the head without getting trapped there." Steven W. Beattie, in his National Post review of the novel has caught its place in Lent's oeuvre: "If So It Won't Go Away is a series of distinct riffs and trills, The Path to Ardroe more closely resembles a symphony, with a number of different movements circling around a central theme."

Lengthier analyses of Lent's work are found in Craig McLuckie's "Improvisation of Self and Other in John Lent's Developing Aesthetic", which offers coverage of the published work (excluding songs) up to Black Horses, Cobalt Suns, and the book length conversation on writing conducted with Robert Kroetsch, Abundance, which offers significant insight to Lent's creative praxis generally and to So It Won't Go Away specifically. Kootenay writer Angie Abdou, reviewing the book, remarks " In Abundance, readers are immersed in an intimate conversation between two greats of Canadian literature—great teachers, great writers, great minds."

== Bibliography ==
- 1978: A Rock Solid
- 1982: Wood Lake Music
- 1984: Frieze
- 1990: The Face in the Garden
- 1996: Monet's Garden
- 2000: Black Horses, Cobalt Suns
- 2005: So It Won't Go Away
- 2007: Abundance (with Robert Kroetsch)
- 2009: Cantilevered Songs
- 2012: The Path to Ardroe, ISBN 978-1-927068-01-4

== Discography ==
Recordings include:

- 2005: Shadow Moon (with the Lent/Fraser/Wall Trio)

John Lent's family has a strong presence musically; his songs have been recorded by a number of artists. With his sister, Susan, and brother, John Lent formed a folk-rock group, The Circle Widens, who were sturdy cover artists.
