= Wendy Phillips (author) =

Canadian author

- Education: Children's Literature Degree
- Alma mater: University of British Columbia
- Occupations: Teacher, Librarian, Children Novelist
- Children: 2
- Writing career
- Notable work: Fishtailing
- Notable awards: Governor General's Literary Awards for Children's Literature
- Website: wendyphillips.org

Wendy Philips is a Canadian author. She grew up in Kamloops, British Columbia, and wrote her first book at the age of 11, and completed degrees in journalism, English, education and a children's literature degree from the University of British Columbia in Vancouver, British Columbia. Her past jobs have included journalism, bookbinding and teaching English. She has lived in Lesotho, Ottawa, South Africa, and Australia, but currently lives in Richmond, British Columbia, with her husband, son and daughter. Phillips currently works as a teacher-librarian at MacNeill Secondary School in Richmond, British Columbia. Phillips is also an author of young adult fiction, whose first book Fishtailing won the 2010 Governor General's Award for children's literature.

== Notable works ==
Philip's first and only book Fishtailing was published in 2010 by Coteau Books after only two previous rejections. She was the 2010 winner of the Governor General's Literary Awards for Children's Literature in Ottawa, Ontario, Canada. Fishtailing follows the lives of four fictional Vancouver high school students; Natalie, Tricia, Miguel and Kyle. The book switches perspectives between the four characters, showing how they interact and deal with violence, bullying and their desires to fit in. This book is unusual because it is written in verse instead of prose. Therefore, the book switches between the four central characters by displaying poems written by them. This book comes from Phillips' experiences with students. As a Librarian and teacher, Phillips was exposed to both the positive diversity of different cultures of a multicultural society, as well as the negative experiences students' bear at home that affect their school and social behaviour. With an equal representation of students, teachers and school counsellors in her novel, Phillips expresses the conflicts of getting through to students and identifying challenges from each role within the schools.

=== Fishtailing ===
Sexually abused by her father's friend, having her parents' love taken away from her by alcoholism and work, Natalie tries to take control by hurting others more than she is hurting. She cuts herself and is out to make other people hurt.

Tricia is a Japanese-Canadian who is a 'good girl'. She is attracted to Natalie and learns from her how to isolate her family and cut herself. Eventually, Tricia realizes that she doesn't want to hurt people and becomes disenchanted with Natalie.

Kyle is a boy who is torn between a choice of a career in the trades or music. He falls in love with Tricia. Through this love, he pursues his musical talents while at the same time, keeping his love for the trades.

Miguel is an immigrant from a war torn Central American country. His parents are dead from the conflict, his village was slaughtered and he is living with his revolutionary uncle. He is full of anger and knowledge of knives and guns. When he arrives at the high school, he tries to fit in by playing soccer and doing assignments. He is attracted to Natalie who seduces him.

Two other characters in this book are Mrs. Farr, the English teacher and Janice Nishi, the guidance counselor. Their notes to each other and marking feedback appear in the book along with the poems of the four teenagers. They try to help the students, however, there is a disconnect between them and the students as well as obliviousness about their home lives.

At the end, Natalie, at a wild party, trick Kyle and Tricia and betrays Miguel. Kyle and Tricia, though hurt and scarred, save their relationship. However, Natalie transfers to a new school and Miguel commits suicide.

== Influences ==
Phillips draws on her experiences as a teacher and librarian in her writing.

Some of the characters in the book are based on the students that Phillips has taught. The character Miguel is based on a student that wrote about El Salvador and Pablo Neruda. The character Natalie is based on a student that Phillips has taught, someone who is a good writer, charismatic but was isolated to her peers. Some of the traits that Kyle has such as someone who loves playing guitar and mechanics were based on Phillips' son. The character Tricia is based on some students that are mixed race. Some of the traits Mrs.Farr has are based on Phillips herself such as using big words when in an uncomfortable conflict and the way Mrs.Farr gives criticism to her students about their work.

The title of the book is influenced from a trip that Phillips made through Coquihalla which is in British Columbia Highway 5. During the trip it was snowing and her car kept sliding and fishtailing around. Phillips felt that this is what her character Miguel felt about his life. How he does not have control over his life.

Influences on Phillips' writing include Margaret Laurence, Alice Munro, Barbara Kingsolver, Margaret Atwood, Douglas Coupland, Annie Proulx, and Haruki Murakami. Young adults' writers that have influenced Phillips include Martha Brooks, Budge Wilson, and Susan Juby. Phillips' has also been influenced by Sharon Creech, Robert Koertje, Pamela, Porter, Sonya Sones, and Karen Hesse on verse novels. A contributor to Phillips' writing is Alison Acheson, Phillips' editor and former professor at UBC.
