= Jeanette Lynes =

Canadian author, poet and professor

Jeanette Lynes is a Canadian author, poet and professor born in Hanover, Ontario. She went to high school in Hanover and Flesherton, Ontario. She then earned an Honours B.A. in English from York University, Toronto, and went on to earn an M.A. and a Ph.D. in English (Canadian Literature) from York University. In 2005 she received an M.F.A. in Writing from the University of Southern Maine's low-residency Stonecoast Program. Jeanette has taught university in Canada and the United States since the mid-1980s. She was the Pathy visiting Professor of Canadian Studies at Princeton University in 2003. She is a former co-editor of The Antigonish Review. Lynes has been a Writer in Residence at Northern Lights College in B.C., Saskatoon Public Library, Kwantlen Polytechnic University and The Kingston Writers' Festival. She has also been on faculty at The Banff Centre (Writing with Style, 2010) and The Sage Hill Writing Experience (2006-2008) She is now Coordinator of the M.F.A. in Writing at the University of Saskatchewan and a professor in the Department of English at the University of Saskatchewan. Lynes is the author of seven collections of poetry and four novels.

== Writing ==
=== Novels ===
The Paper Birds (HarperCollins 2025)

The Apothecary's Garden (HarperCollins 2022)

The Small Things that End the World (Coteau Books 2018)

Set in World War II, Factory Voice (Coteau Books 2009) is the story of four women whose lives are forever changed by the opportunities the war affords them. The Globe and Mail calls it a, "rollicking good tale that shows regular ol' Canadians making the best of the worst of times. It'll make you laugh and cry."

=== Poetry ===
Bedlam Cowslip (Buckrider Books 2015)

Archive of the Undressed (Wolsak & Wynn 2012) is based on vintage Playboys and explores our relationship with pornography, the naked form, and the loneliness of these images.

The New Blue Distance (Wolsak & Wynn 2009)

It's Hard Being Queen: The Dusty Springfield Poems (Freehand Books 2008)

Left Fields (Wolsak & Wynn 2003)

The Aging Cheerleader's Alphabet (Mansfield Press 2003)

A Woman Alone on the Atikokan Highway (Wolsak & Wynn 1999)

=== Non-fiction ===
Apron Apocalypse: Lyric Essays (Thistledown Press 2026)

== Awards ==
The Paper Birds (2025) and The Small Things that End the World (2018) each won the Saskatchewan Book Award for Fiction.

The Factory Voice (2009) was long-listed for The Scotiabank Giller Prize, for the ReLit Awards (2010), and was a Globe and Mail 'Top 100' book for 2009.

Archive of the Undressed (2012) was shortlisted for the City of Saskatoon and Public Library Saskatoon Book Award and the Saskatchewan Arts Board Poetry Award.

Lynes was shortlisted for the 2012 Matrix Litpop Awards, won the Nick Blatchford Occasional Verse contest sponsored by The New Quarterly, for her poem The Day John Clare Fell in Love (1818) in 2010. Lynes was a co-winner of the Ralph Gustafson Poetry Prize in 2005, was a finalist for the Pat Lowther Memorial Award in 2004, won the Bliss Carman Poetry Prize in 2001, the Short Grain Contest for best dramatic monologue in 2001, and the Short Grain Contest for best postcard story in 2000 (from Grain Magazine).
