= Grain (magazine) =

Canadian literary magazine

- Grain Vol 39 Issue 3
- Editor: Guest Editors
- Categories: Literary magazine
- Frequency: Quarterly
- Publisher: The Saskatchewan Writers' Guild
- Founded: 1973
- Country: Canada
- Language: Canadian English
- Website: www.grainmagazine.ca
- ISSN: 1491-0497

Grain is a Canadian literary magazine featuring poetry, short fiction, non-fiction, and artwork. It is published quarterly by the Saskatchewan Writers' Guild and is based in Regina, Saskatchewan.

== History ==
Grain published its first issue in June 1973, a gestetner edition with stapled, taped bindings, and with cover art on a card-stock cover by a then new artist Joe Fafard. The first edition, edited by Ken Mitchell, Anne Szumigalski, and Caroline Heath included writings by Robert Kroetsch, George Bowering, Robert Currie, and John V. Hicks, and cost $1.00. A subscription cost $2 a year, or $5 for three years. This was the first of a series of semi-annual issues. In 1976, Grain began publishing three issues a year, and then in 1981, moved to its present quarterly - four issues a year - state. Over the years it has published many prominent poets and authors from Canada and abroad. Overall, approximately 3,000 pieces of writing and over 500 art images have been published.

== Short Grain Contest ==
The first Short Grain contest was announced in 1988. The contest would accept submissions in two categories: Postcard Stories: Narrative fiction under 500 words; and Prose Poem: A lyric poem written as a prose paragraph or paragraphs in 500 words or less. A total of 1000$ in awards was offered over 1st, 2nd, and 3rd places in both categories. This first award was sponsored by M. C. Graphics, the printer of Grain.

In 1991 Houghton Boston Printers took over printing of Grain magazine. This year also marked a change in Short Grain sponsorship. Cheryl and Henry Kloppenburg, Barristers and Solicitors of Saskatoon, began sponsoring the Short Grain contest, which they continue to do.

This contest now awards $4,500 in prizes annually between the categories of Poetry and Fiction/Creative Non-Fiction.

== Editors ==
Grain has had 11 editors in its 40-year history:

- Ken Mitchell
- Caroline Heath
- E.F. Dyck
- Brenda Riches
- Mick Burrs
- Geoffrey Ursell
- J. Jill Robinson
- Elizabeth Philips
- Kent Bruyneel
- Sylvia Legris
- Rilla Friesen

== Notable contributors ==
Grain has featured many renowned and award-winning writers including:

- Ken Babstock
- Roo Borson
- George Bowering
- Lorna Crozier
- Jeramy Dodds
- Connie Gault
- John V. Hicks
- Richard Holeton
- Barbara Klar
- Robert Kroetsch
- Patrick Lane
- Tim Lilburn
- Yann Martel
- Don McKay
- A. F. Moritz
- Al Purdy
- Anne Simpson
- Karen Solie
- Moez Surani
- Guy Vanderhaeghe
- Jan Zwicky

== See also ==
- List of literary magazines
