= Marie Elyse St. George =

Canadian artist and poet (born 1929)

- Born: Marie Elyse Yates; December 8, 1929 (age 96); Merritton, St. Catharines, Ontario
- Education: University of New Hampshire, University of Saskatchewan
- Known for: printmaker, poet
- Spouse: Leonard Bruce St. George (m. 1953)
- Awards: Saskatchewan Writers Guild First Prize for Poetry, The League of Canadian Poets National Poetry Contest First Prize, Saskatchewan Book Award for Nonfiction, Governor General’s Literary Award, Saskatchewan YWCA’s Women of Distinction Award for Arts and Culture

Marie Elyse St. George (born December 8, 1929, in Merritton, St. Catharines, Ontario) is a Canadian artist and poet. She is known for her paintings, drawings, prints (especially etchings), mixed media work and poetry.

== Career ==
Elyse St. George studied painting, printmaking and drawing at the University of New Hampshire from 1967 to 1972 (the year she moved to Saskatoon) and studied lithography at the University of Saskatchewan in 1977. Her work covers a wide range of subjects including portraits and themes derived from her poetry and historical figures. She created one of the 40 special "windows" for the Discovery Train which toured Canada.

Around 1974, she received a grant from the Canada Council to set up her printing shop and to produce a book of etchings and prose. In 1982, St. George joined with five other artists to form the Group of 5 Co-operative Gallery Ltd. In 1987, her poems, etchings, and paintings were published under the title White Lions in the Afternoon published by Coteau Books, Regina, Saskaskatchewan. From 1965 to 1973, she also taught at The Art Association in Durham, New Hampshire. In 1975, she taught print workshops at the Mendel Art Gallery in Saskatoon and in 1980, at the Biggar Community College and the Prince Albert Art Centre.

She worked on book jackets for several Canadian writers including Lois Simmie, Bonnie Burnard, and Byrna Barclay. In 1995, she collaborated with Anne Szumigalski on a book titled Voice (published by Coteau Books), which won the Governor General’s Award for poetry in 1995. In 2000, Szumigalski and St. George later collaborated on another book titled Fear of Knives: A Book of Fables (published by Hagios).

Her memoir, titled Once in a Blue Moon, won the Saskatchewan Book Award in 2006. She was a participant in the Regina National Poetry Face-off, which aired on CBC Radio in 2009.

== Awards ==
- 1989 - Saskatchewan Writers Guild first prize for poetry;
- 1989 - The League of Canadian Poets National Poetry Contest first prize;
- 1996 - Saskatchewan YWCA's Women of Distinction Award for Arts and Culture.
- 2006 - the Saskatchewan Book Award for Nonfiction.

== Sources ==
- "Artist/Maker Name 'St. George, Elyse Yates'" Canadian Heritage Information Network. Retrieved 2016-03-05.
- "Holdings: Fear of knives : a book of fables" York University Library. Retrieved 2016-03-05.
- St. George, Marie Elyse. Once in a Blue Moon: An Artist's Life. Regina: Coteau Books 2006. ISBN 1550503383 pp270.
- "St. George, Marie" Poets.ca. Retrieved 2016-03-05.
- St. George, Marie Elyse Yates Archives Canada. Retrieved 2016-03-05.
