= Curtis Gillespie =

Canadian writer

Curtis Gillespie is a Canadian writer from Edmonton, Alberta, and is most noted as the winner of seven National Magazine Awards for his writing on politics, culture, family and sport. He is also the winner of many provincial, regional and national awards for his magazine writing and book-length fiction and non-fiction.

Born and raised in Alberta, Gillespie went to Scotland to study history at the University of St. Andrews before returning to Canada. He has published in many outlets, including The New York Times, the Paris Review, The Walrus, Western Living, Toronto Life, Alberta Views and Saturday Night, among many others.

The Progress of an Object in Motion was published by Coteau Books in 1997. It won the Danuta Gleed award, as well as the Henry Kreisel Award for best first book from the Alberta Literary Awards, and was a nominee for the Howard O'Hagan Award for short stories.

He followed in 2000 with Someone Like That: Life Stories, a collection of non-fiction profiles of people with developmental disabilities whom he had met in his past work as a case worker with Alberta's Catholic Social Services. The following year he and his family returned to Scotland for a year, following which he published the 2002 memoir Playing Through: A Year of Life and Links Along the Scottish Coast, which was described as "the golf version of A Year in Provence."

In 2007, he published the novel Crown Shyness, about a political journalist's interactions with a far-right politician. The novel was a nominee for the ReLit Awards in 2008. He published Almost There: The Family Vacation, Then and Now in 2012.

In 2010, he co-founded (with Lynn Coady) the award-winning magazine Eighteen Bridges, which he also edited. He has also been an educator and writer in residence at the University of Alberta, the Banff Centre and Grant MacEwan University. In the spring of 2026, he was awarded the 2026 Foundation Award for Outstanding Achievement from the National Media Awards Foundation.
