= Mark Morton =

Mark Morton may refer to:

- Mark Morton (politician) (1865–1938), New South Wales politician
- Mark Morton (businessman) (1858–1951), co-founder of Morton Salt
- Mark Morton (guitarist) (born 1972), guitarist with Lamb of God
- Mark Steven Morton (born 1963), Canadian author
- Mark Morton (double bassist) (born 1962), professor of double bass at Texas Tech University
- Mark Morton (rugby union), Australian international rugby union player
