= Sylvia Legris =

Canadian poet (born 1960)

Sylvia Legris (born 1960) is a Canadian poet. Originally from Winnipeg, Manitoba, she now lives in Saskatoon, Saskatchewan. She has published four volumes of poetry, the third of which, Nerve Squall, won the 2006 Griffin Poetry Prize and Pat Lowther Award, and the fourth of which was published by New Directions.

Legris has also twice been nominated for a Pushcart Prize. She has been nominated for Best of the Small Presses Series, and in 2001 won The Malahat Review's Long Poem Prize for Fishblood Sky. Legris also received an Honourable Mention in the poetry category of the 2004 National Magazine Awards.

Legris served as Editor at Grain from 2008–2011.

== Bibliography ==
=== Collections ===
- ash petals (chapbook 1996)
- Circuitry of Veins (Turnstone Press 1996)
- Iridium Seeds (Turnstone Press 1998)
- Nerve Squall (Coach House Press 2005) – winner of 2006 Pat Lowther Award and the 2006 Canadian Griffin Poetry Prize; shortlisted for the Saskatchewan Book Award
- Pneumatic Antiphonal (New Directions 2013)
- The Hideous Hidden (New Directions 2016)
- Garden Physic (New Directions 2021)
- The Principle of Rapid Peering (New Directions 2024)

=== Poems ===
Title	Year	First published in	Collected in
Thymus	2014	The New Yorker 90/32 (October 20, 2014)	
