= Millennium Film Workshop =

Non-profit in New York City

The Millennium Film Workshop is a non-profit media arts center located in New York City. It is dedicated to the exhibition, study, and practice of avant-garde and experimental cinema. It was also where the St. Mark's Poetry Project began. Ken Jacobs stated that he based the name on the archaic meaning of the word millennium as 'a hoped for period of joy, serenity, prosperity and justice.'

== History ==
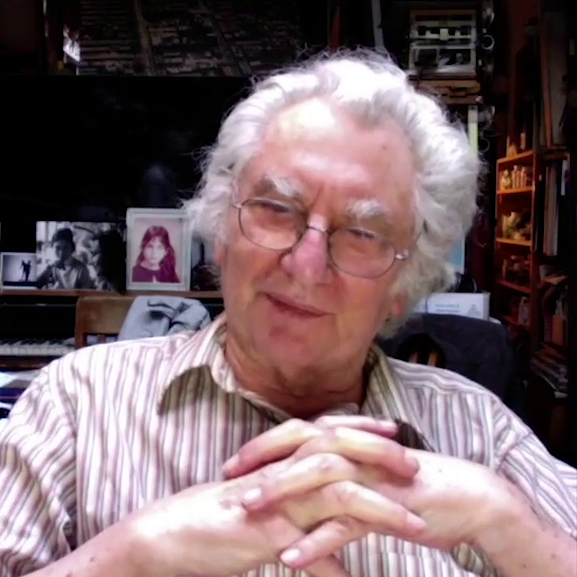
Founder Ken Jacobs

The Millennium Film Workshop was one of a group of arts workshops set up from 1965-66 on the Lower East Side by St. Mark's Church and the New School as part of the federal government’s anti-poverty program. Filmmaker Ken Jacobs was chosen as the first director, and in 1966, he set up Sunday afternoon showings at the church – mostly one-person programs open to any filmmaker with a body of work. Jacobs also launched “open screenings,” where he led discussions between filmmakers and the audience.

In May 1967, the organization became independent, incorporating as Millennium Film Workshop, Inc. and moved to a building now used by Anthology Film Archives. At the time, the building was an old courthouse. Classes in cinematography, sound, and editing were taught. Following the move to the old courthouse, the organization moved to various locations in lower Manhattan, including a loft space on Great Jones Street, but it finally found a home at 66 East 4th Street in 1974. It remained at that location for 39 years, before leaving in June 2013 due to rising rent. After that, Millennium spent the following nine years offering classes and screenings in collaboration with various non-profits, in venues around Manhattan and Brooklyn. In June 2022, Millennium Film Workshop opened its doors at a new location at 167 Wilson Avenue in Bushwick, Brooklyn.

In 1971, filmmaker Howard Guttenplan took the role of Executive Director and held the position until 2011. Guttenplan broadened the workshop's field by inviting foreign filmmakers from Britain, Germany, France, Hungary, Poland, Japan, and other regions to make their American debuts at Millennium.

In 2015, filmmaker Joey Huertas took the role of Executive Director and held the position until 2022. During the years the organization was without a permanent space, he ran its open screenings in rented venues under the name "HIJACK Open Screenings" from 2017 to 2019. Joe Wakeman succeeded him as Executive Director in 2022.

== Programs ==
The Millennium Film Workshop offers five major programs and services, including the Personal Cinema Series, the Workshop Program, Equipment Access Service, the Millennium Film Journal, and the Millennium Gallery.

=== Personal Cinema Series ===
Most shows in the Personal Cinema Series are one-person programs where the artist discusses his work with the audience. This "film-talk" format is also applied to group programs, shows featuring various pieces of media, and open screenings that operate as a part of the Series. The latter format has been a regular part of the series since the founding of the organization.

Artists who were given the opportunity to mount their first one-person shows at Millennium include Hollis Frampton, Clayton Patterson, Jennifer Reeves, Donna Cameron, Bill Morrison, Fred Worden, M.M. Serra, Todd Haynes, Vivienne Dick, Holly Fisher, Sharon Greytak, Lewis Klahr, and Su Friedrich.

Jon Jost, Kenneth Anger, Carolee Schneeman, Valie Export, Paul Sharits, Michael Snow, Malcolm Le Grice, Yvonne Rainer, Bruce Conner, Coleen Fitzgibbon, Robert Breer, Birgit Hein, Ernie Gehr, Abigail Child, Amy Greenfield, James Benning, Rudy Burckhardt, and others have premiered their newest work at the Millennium, and the organization worked closely with the late Jack Smith. The legendary Stan Brakhage was a passionate supporter of the organization for thirty years, and he premiered many of his films in the cinema. In addition, Millennium has provided space for experimental theater works, including Charles Ludlam, Allen Ginsberg, Stuart Sherman, Tony Conrad, Jackson MacLow, and others. In 1991, The Museum of Modern Art celebrated its 25th anniversary by presenting a 13-show program of films that had premiered at the Millennium over the years.

=== Workshop Program & Equipment Access Service ===
The Workshop Program features classes in film and video production. Past and present instructors include Alan Berliner, Su Friedrich, Barbara Hammer, Paul Sharits, Jud Yalkut, Ross McLaren, Jennifer Reeves, Kelly Spivey, Noël Carroll, Nisi Jacobs, Rachel Shuman, and Jon Jost. Workshop topics include optical printing, Final Cut Pro editing, Steenbeck editing, 16mm, Super 8mm film gauges, and digital video. The organization is one of the only remaining establishments in New York City that provides classes, facilities, and equipment rental for optical printing and Super 8 mm film. The Millennium also provides access to screening rooms, editing facilities, and film/video production equipment. Oliver Stone, Joie Lee, Jim Jarmusch, and Susan Seidelman were members and equipment users. Andy Warhol used the editing rooms in the 1960s, and Jean-Luc Godard used the screening room services to view a film by Amos Poe in the 1980s.

=== Millennium Film Journal ===
The Millennium Film Journal was established in 1978 by Howard Guttenplan, Alister Sanderson, Vicki Peterson, and David Shapiro. Dedicated to avant-garde cinema, theory, and practice. MFJ is published biannually.
