= Jennifer Reeves =

New York-based independent filmmaker

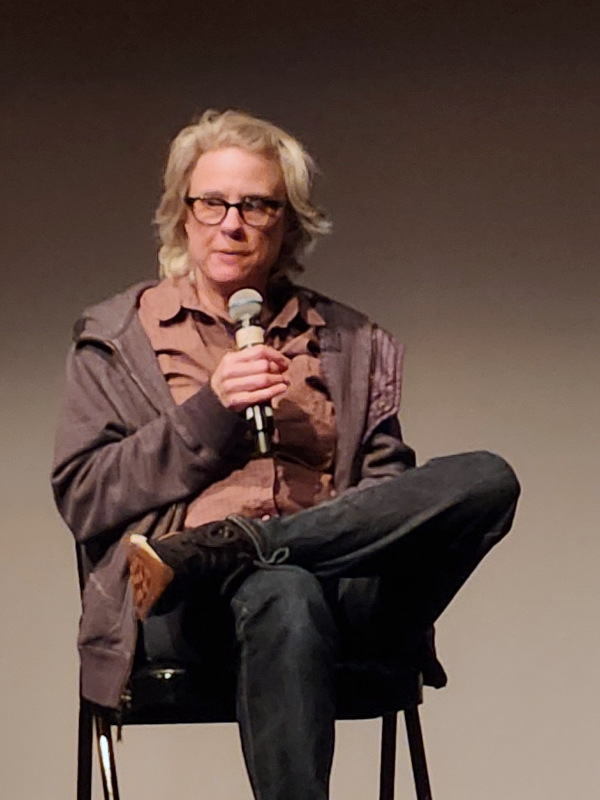
- Jennifer Reeves in 2026
- Born: 1971 (age 54–55); Ceylon, Sri Lanka
- Education: Bard College
- Occupation: Filmmaker
- Years active: 1990–present
- Notable work: Chronic, The Time We Killed, When It Was Blue
- Spouse: William Wu (m. 2006)
- Children: Teo Reeves-Wu and Luca Reeves-wu

Jennifer Todd Reeves (born 1971) is a New York–based independent filmmaker. She has also taught as a part time professor of film at Bard College, The Cooper Union, Millennium Film Workshop and the School of Visual Arts.

== Background ==
Reeves's 16 mm films are often experimental and deal with a range of issues, including mental health, politics, sexuality, feminism and the environment. Reeves began making her own films in 1990 and is known to provide her own writing, cinematography, editing and sound design in her works. Her films also feature collaborations with composers such as Marc Ribot, Skúli Sverrisson, Elliott Sharp, Zeena Parkins, Anthony Burr, and Eyvind Kang. Reeves has produced many films over the years, the most noteworthy being The Time We Killed (2004) and When It Was Blue (2008).

== Influences, style and themes ==
Reeves began to take an interest in film during her upbringing in Akron, Ohio, where she became passionate about analog media and foreign films. Her time at Bard College exposed her to avant-garde films and the works of Carolee Schneemann, from which Reeves's own works draw inspiration. Reeves has also identified filmmakers Stan Brakhage and Annabel Nicolson as major influences. Consequently, many of Reeves's films employ elements of abstraction, nostalgia, and projection. Thematically, her films tend to deal with a wide variety of issues, from sexuality and feminism to the environment and politics.

== Work ==
The award-winning The Time We Killed is a narrative-driven film that deals with the life of a New York writer during the aftermath of the September 11 Attacks. Reeves's 2008 multiple-projection film When It Was Blue is a non-narrative piece which deals with a number of concurrent issues. The film makes use of a number of techniques to visually disorient the viewer, including hand-painted frames, a staple of Reeves's work. By juxtaposing nature and industry in an aesthetically chaotic manner, the film denies access to the planet and its resources as commodities to be objectified. Conversely, the film features footage of Reeves herself cut alongside shots of men looking from a distance, followed by a series of distressing images. This sequence symbolizes the objectification of the female body as something to be gazed upon, and also addresses the issue of othering. In the aftermath of making When It Was Blue, Reeves found herself in possession of a large amount of 16mm film containing outtakes from the project. Concerned with her work's impact on the environment, she temporarily let the footage decompose in a landfill, then salvaged and hand-painted the resulting film. The project was titled Landfill 16, and through its repurposing of the film, the work draws connections to nature's losing battle to decompose the waste we produce. In 2007, Reeves produced another 16mm double-projection film titled Light Work Mood Disorder, a work which pairs found footage of educational films with X-rays of the body. She degraded the film with a solution made from dissolved pills which were intended to treat a number of physical and mental conditions. The resulting damage to the film is akin to the adverse effects of overmedication.

== Personal life ==
Reeves married her husband William Wu in 2006. The couple have two sons, Teo and Luca.

== Filmography ==
- Elations in Negative (1990)
- Girls Daydream About Hollywood (1992)
- Taste It Nine Times (1992)
- Monsters in the Closet (1993)
- Configuration 20 (1994)
- The Girl's Nervy (1995)
- Chronic (1996)
- We Are Going Home (1998)
- Darling International (1999)
- Skinny Teeth (2001)
- Fear of Blushing (2001)
- The Sons of Bitches Turned Out the Lights (2003)
- He Walked Away (2003-2006)
- The Time We Killed (2004)
- Shadows Choose Their Horrors (2005-2015)
- Light Work I (2006)
- Light Work Mood Disorder (2007)
- When It Was Blue (2008)
- Trains Are for Dreaming (2009)
- Untitled Babies Short (2010)
- Landfill 16 (2011)
- Strawberries in the Summertime (2013)
- Color Neutral (2014)
