= Mick Burrs =

Canadian poet (1940–2021)

Mick Burrs (April 1940 – April 20, 2021) was a Canadian poet who lived in Toronto, Ontario. He was born and raised in California, and after leaving the United States to avoid the Vietnam War, he spent much of his life in Yorkton, Saskatchewan. He won the 1998 Saskatchewan Book Award for Poetry for a volume of his collected works, Variations on the Birth of Jacob. This book was published under his birth name, Steven Michael Berzensky, as was a comprehensive collection of his poetry, The Names Leave the Stones: Poems New and Selected (2001 Canada, 2002 United States). He was the former editor of Grain magazine. He died on April 20, 2021, at the age of 81 just 10 days after his birthday.

== Works ==
- 1973: Children on the Edge of Space
- 1975: Game Farm: Poems for Intereflection 1967-1975 Limited to 500 Copies.
- 1976: Moving in from Paradise
- 1982: The Waking Image Bedside Companion
- 1983: The Blue Pools of Paradise
- 1993: Dark Halo
- 1997: Variations on the Birth of Jacob
- 2001: The Names Leave the Stones: Poems New and Selected (Coteau Books), ISBN 978-1-55050-191-9
