= Alberta Views =

Regional magazine published in Alberta, Canada since 1997

- Categories: Regional magazine
- Frequency: 10 per year
- Circulation: 15,000
- Founder: Jackie Flanagan
- Founded: 1997
- First issue: January 1997
- Country: Canada
- Based in: Calgary
- Language: English
- Website: www.albertaviews.ca
- ISSN: 1480-3151

Alberta Views (also AlbertaViews) is a Calgary, Alberta regional magazine, established in 1997, that covers political, social and cultural issues in the province of Alberta. It is published 10 times annually and its monthly print run was 15,000 copies by 2016. Its monthly readership in 2016 was 76,000. Alberta Views was named Canadian Magazine of the Year at the 2009 National Magazine Awards. John Ralston Saul has called Alberta Views "the new model for what a magazine can be in Canada."

== History ==
Alberta Views was first published in January 1998 as a quarterly. Since 2006, the magazine has published 10 issues a year. The founding publisher is Jackie Flanagan, a Calgary college educator, novelist and philanthropist. In a speech at the 2009 NMAs, Flanagan said she founded Alberta Views to counter provincial stereotypes. "Many eastern media turned to Ted Byfield when they wanted to hear the views of Albertans. And as a third-generation Albertan, I was concerned because he did not reflect the opinions of any Albertan I knew. And if Alberta Views has done anything to correct the false image that my province has in the rest of the country, I am very grateful."

== Tagline and orientation ==
Alberta Views originally used the tagline "The Magazine about Alberta for Albertans," and, later, "Leading the Political, Cultural and Social Debate" and "A Forum for Dialogue." The magazine's tagline in 2016 is "New Perspectives for Engaged Citizens." Alberta Views does not endorse a political party.

Alberta Views is not to be confused with Alberta Report, a defunct right-of-centre magazine based in Edmonton, Alberta, founded by Ted Byfield.

== Departments ==
The magazine publishes three long-form (3,000+ word) stories every issue as well as original short fiction and essays. Alberta Views departments include columns by Governor General's Award and Giller Prize-nominated author Fred Stenson ("Wit") and former Banff National Park superintendent Kevin Van Tighem ("This Land"), book reviews, arts listings, a ministerial profile ("Meet the Minister"), community profiles and "Eye on Alberta," a mix of news stories, blog posts, speeches and poems from across the province and country.

== Notable contributors ==
Past contributors to Alberta Views have included notable journalists, magazine writers, essayists, artists, academics and politicians including Katherine Ashenburg, Todd Babiak, Karen Connelly, Marcello Di Cintio, Will Ferguson, Curtis Gillespie —co-founder of Eighteen Bridges magazine, Katherine Govier, Alex Himelfarb, Greg Hollingshead, Jay Ingram, Robert Kroetsch, Sid Marty, Linda McQuaig, Omar Mouallem, Andrew Nikiforuk, John Ralston Saul, Paula Simons—a long-time writer for the Edmonton Journal, Kevin Taft, Chris Turner, Andrew Unger, Aritha van Herk, Thomas Wharton, and Rudy Wiebe.

== Awards ==
In addition to being named Canadian Magazine of the Year (2008) at the National Magazine Awards, Alberta Views has won numerous individual NMAs, Alberta Magazine Awards and Western Magazine Awards including Best Magazine (2005), an Utne magazine Independent Press award for local/regional coverage (2007) and the 2004 Alberta Mental Health Board award.

== Reviews ==
Ezra Levant described the magazine as "an artsy liberal magazine" in 2010.
