= Mark Abley =

Canadian author and journalist

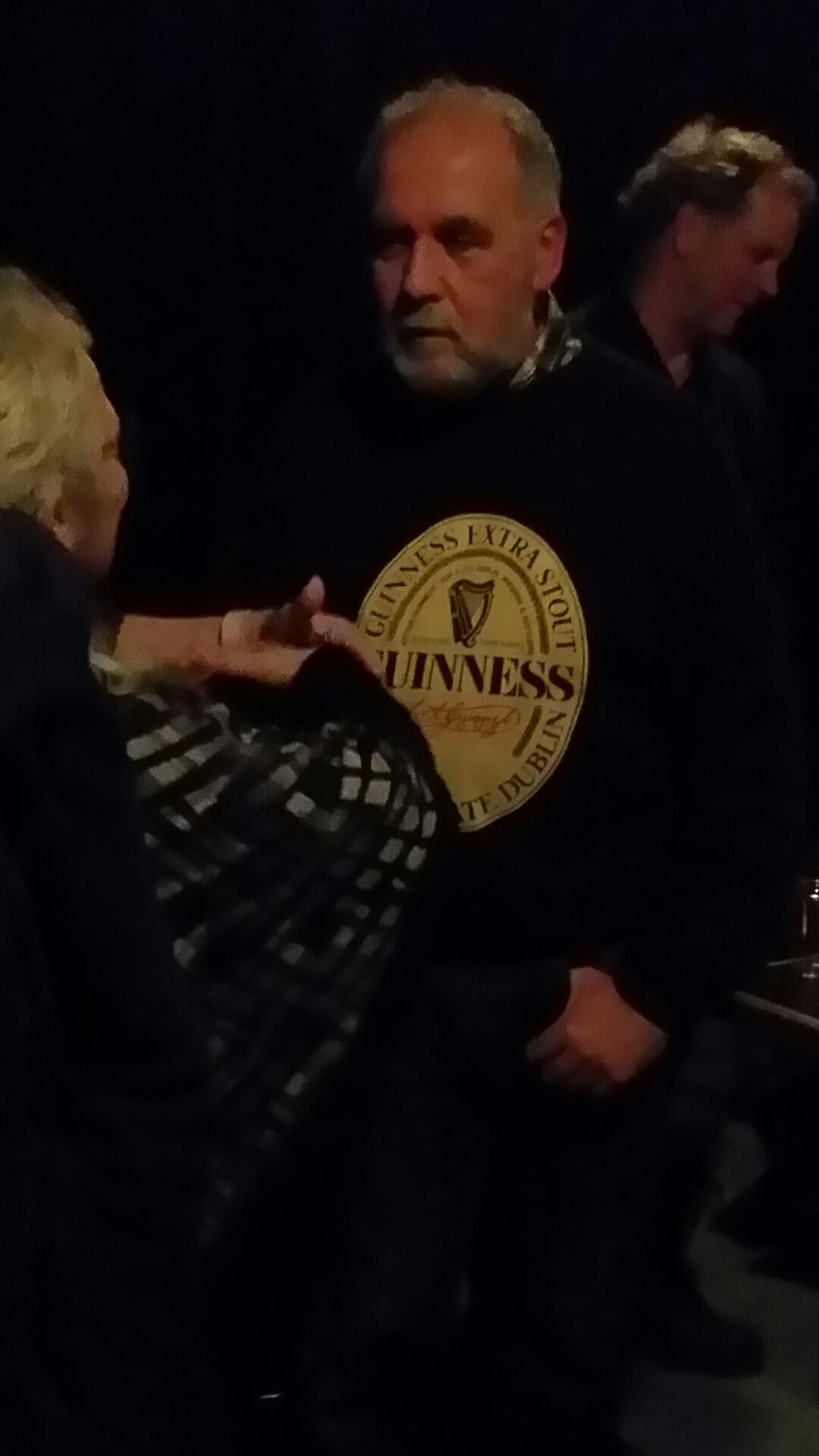
Mark Abley photographed in Montréal, Québec, Canada at La Vitrola.

Mark Abley (born 13 May 1955) is a Canadian poet, journalist, editor and nonfiction writer. His poetry and some of his nonfiction books express his interest in endangered languages. In November 2022, Abley was awarded an honorary D.Litt. by the University of Saskatchewan for his writing career and for his services to Canadian literature.

A Rhodes Scholar, Abley settled in Montreal in 1983, where he lived until 2024. His memoir of his father, The Organist: Fugues, Fatherhood, and a Fragile Mind, appeared in 2019. It was followed by a work of literary travel, Strange Bewildering Time: Istanbul to Kathmandu in the Last Year of the Hippie Trail (2023). In 2024, he moved to Gananoque, Ontario.

== Early life ==
Born in Warwickshire, England, Mark Abley moved to Canada with his family as a small boy, and grew up in Lethbridge, Alberta and Saskatoon, Saskatchewan. His father Harry was an organist who played in churches and cinemas; he also taught the pipe organ. His father's struggle with depressive illness is a major theme of Abley's memoir of his father, The Organist (2019).

Abley attended the University of Saskatchewan, from which he won a Rhodes Scholarship in 1975. He won prizes for his poetry while a student at St John's College, Oxford, and began to write full-time after returning to Canada and moving to Toronto in 1978. He was a contributing editor of both Maclean's and Saturday Night magazines, and a frequent contributor to The Times Literary Supplement.

== Career ==
As a young man Abley was a freelance writer and broadcaster. For sixteen years he worked as a feature writer and book-review editor at the Montreal Gazette. In 1996 he won Canada's National Newspaper Award for critical writing; he was previously shortlisted for the award in 1992 in the category of international reporting for a series of articles about the Horn of Africa. He returned to freelance writing in 2003, though he continued to write the "Watchwords" columns on language issues for the Gazette. Between 2009 and 2020 he worked at McGill-Queen's University Press as an acquisition editor. He served as the first writer-in-residence for the city of Pointe-Claire in 2010–11.

He has written four books of poetry, two children's books, and several non-fiction books. Spoken Here: Travels Among Threatened Languages (2003) describes people and cultures whose languages are at risk of vanishing in an era of globalization. It was short-listed for the Grand Prix du Livre de Montréal and the Pearson Writers' Trust Nonfiction Prize. It has been translated into French, Spanish, Japanese and Latvian. In 2009, thanks to the Spanish translation, Abley was awarded the LiberPress Prize for international authors in Girona, Catalonia.

Abley has given talks at Oxford University, College of the Holy Cross, Ohio State University, McGill University, Queen's University, the University of Toronto and elsewhere. He delivered the annual Priestly Lecture at the University of Lethbridge, gave the opening address to a conference of the Association of American University Presses, and spoke in a Festival of Landscape at Magdalene College, Cambridge.

In 2005, he was awarded a Guggenheim Fellowship for research into language change. His book The Prodigal Tongue: Dispatches from the Future of English (2008) was positively reviewed in The Times (London) and by William Safire in The New York Times. In August 2009, Abley published a children's book about words and their origins, Camp Fossil Eyes. He has also written the text of a picture book for young children, Ghost Cat.

Abley has edited several books, including When Earth Leaps Up and A Woman Clothed in Words by Anne Szumigalski; he was Szumigalski's literary executor. Over the years he has led workshops for the Quebec Writers' Federation, the Maritime Writers' Workshop, and the Banff Centre for the Arts. His magazine journalism has appeared in The Walrus, Canadian Geographic, Canada's History and many other publications. He has been shortlisted for the President's Medal at the National Magazine Awards.

In 2013, Abley published Conversations with a Dead Man: The Legacy of Duncan Campbell Scott. Scott was a poet who also ran the Department of Indian Affairs for many years. It received high praise from Bob Rae and Cindy Blackstock among others. A revised and updated edition was published by Stonehewer Books in 2024.

Coteau Books published The Tongues of Earth, a volume of Abley's new and selected poems, in 2015. It was shortlisted for the 2016 Fred Cogswell Award for literary excellence. The Organist was named by BBC Music Magazine as one of the top ten classical music books of 2019. Strange Bewildering Time was shortlisted for a 2024 Foreword Indies Prize in the biography category.

In 2026 Abley's latest book Numb: The Politics of Overwhelm was published by Baraka Books.

Mark Abley's literary papers are held at Concordia University.

== Selected bibliography ==
- 1986: Beyond Forget: Rediscovering the Prairies (literary travel)
- 1988: Blue Sand, Blue Moon (poetry)
- 1994: Glasburyon (poetry)
- 2001: Ghost Cat (children's book)
- 2003: Spoken Here: Travels Among Threatened Languages (literary travel, cultural analysis)
- 2005: The Silver Palace Restaurant (poetry)
- 2008: The Prodigal Tongue: Dispatches from the Future of English (description of language change and its implications)
- 2009: Camp Fossil Eyes: Digging for the Origins of Words (children's book)
- 2013: Conversations with a Dead Man: The Legacy of Duncan Campbell Scott (Indigenous, cultural and literary history)
- 2015: The Tongues of Earth: New and Selected Poems (poetry)
- 2018: Watch Your Tongue: What Our Everyday Sayings and Idioms Figuratively Mean (nonfiction)
- 2019: The Organist: Fugues, Fatherhood, and a Fragile Mind (memoir of the author's father)
- 2023: Strange Bewildering Time: Istanbul to Kathmandu in the Last Year of the Hippie Trail (literary travel)
- 2024: Conversations with a Dead Man: Indigenous Rights and the Legacy of Duncan Campbell Scott (revised and updated edition)
- 2026: Numb: The Politics of Overwhelm (political critique)

== See also ==
- Canadian literature
- Canadian poetry
- List of Canadian poets
- List of Canadian writers
