= Linda Aksomitis =

Canadian author

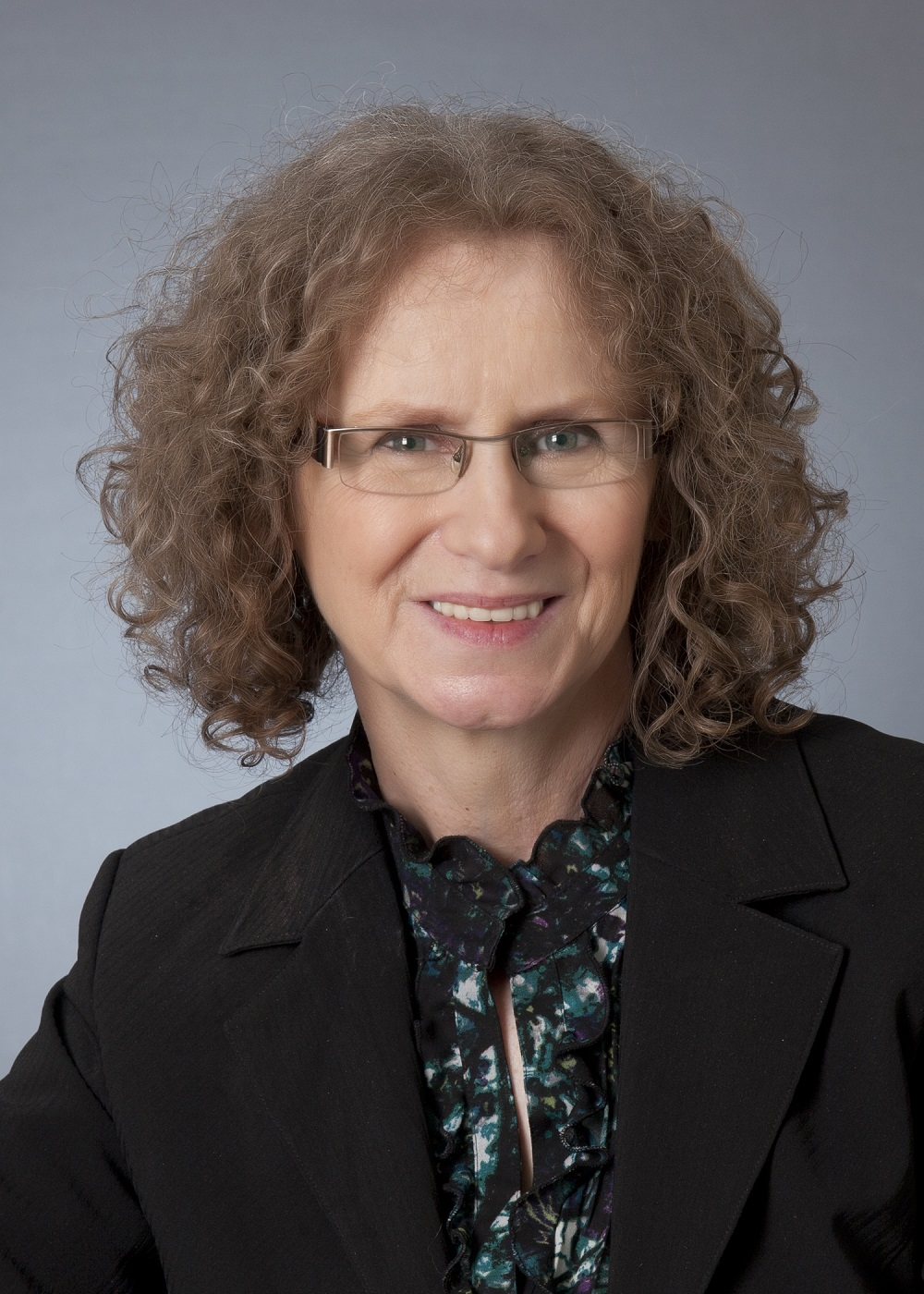
- Linda Aksomitis, February 28, 2014
- Born: Linda Demyen; 7 August 1954 (age 72); Regina, Saskatchewan
- Education: Master Vocational/Technical Education
- Occupation: Photojournalist, nonfiction author, novelist, children's writer, teacher, online curriculum developer
- Spouse: David Aksomitis (1973–present)
- Children: 3
- Writing career
- Pen name: Sunflower Sue
- Period: 1964–present
- Genre: Historical fiction, fairytale retellings, children's literature, short stories
- Subject: Snowmobiles, North America Old West
- Website: aksomitis.com

Linda Aksomitis, née Demyen (born 7 August 1954), is a Canadian author specialising in YA and children's adventure, folktale and fairy tale retellings as well as travel literature. She also writes nonfiction and fiction about the history of the snowmobile. She is a former president of the Saskatchewan Writer's Guild.

Aksomitis currently works as a course developer for Saskatchewan Polytechnic. From 2015 to 2021, she was an instructional designer with Saskatchewan Polytechnic.

She also teaches the online course, Write Effective Web Content, with international certification. Previously she also wrote and instructed the courses, Introduction to Internet Writing Markets, from 2003 to 2023, and Publish and Sell Your E-Books from 2011 to 2023 through the community college network in North America, Australia, New Zealand, Great Britain, and Europe.

Aksomitis did her thesis work at the University of Regina on online education. Exploring the Preferred Communication Modes of Students in Online Nonformal Education and Training was awarded in 2006.

After graduating from the University of Regina with a Master of Vocational/Technical Education, Aksomitis joined Credenda Virtual High School and College as the Coordinator and Instructor for the Library Training Certificate program in 2007. Her textbook, Guide to Becoming a Library Technician was published by ICDC publishing in California. She also delivered professional development library seminars in Alberta, Saskatchewan, and Manitoba after completing a teacher-librarian focus in her undergrad degree and eleven years of working in school libraries.

Aksomitis presented sessions for the travel writing organization, TBEX, in the U.S., Sweden, and the Philippines. Her current travel writing is reviewing museums in Canada and the United States on her travel blog, guide2museums.com.

She's a member of the writers' group, Saskatchewan Children's Writers' Round Robin, which celebrated its 40th anniversary in 2024 with a number of events including presentations at the George Bothwell Library in Regina. Aksomitis has published 30+ books including both fiction and nonfiction. Her books have been published in five different countries by traditional publishers. She's currently focusing on indie publishing, including a series of fairytale and folktale retellings in the Magic Forest Adventures series.

Born in Regina, Saskatchewan, during her early teens, she wrote poetry under the pseudonym Sunflower Sue as occasionally published in The Western Producer magazine.

Aksomitis lives in Qu'Appelle, Saskatchewan.

== Selected bibliography ==
- Station No. 1 on the Outlaw Trail. KDP, 2020. ASIN B08G6J9V7W
- Pictures. Pearson Education Limited, 2012. ISBN 978-0435075743
- L is for Land of Living Skies: A Saskatchewan Alphabet, Sleeping Bear Press, 2010; illustrated by Lorna Bennett ISBN 978-1-58536-490-9
- Longhorns and Outlaws. Coteau Books, 2008. ISBN 1-55050-378-2
- Sports Champions (Science Solves It). Crabtree pub Co, 2008. ISBN 978-0778741725
- Run. Pearson Education New Zealand, 2007. ISBN 978-1869705923
- Adeline's Dream. Coteau Books, 2005. ISBN 1-55050-323-5
- Backroad Mapbook: Southern Saskatchewan. Mussio Ventures, 2005. ISBN 1-894556-65-8
- Backroad mapbook: Nova Scotia. Mussio Ventures, 2005. ISBN 1-894556-83-6
- Illustrated Guide to Snowmobile Racing. Iconografix, 2006. ISBN 1-58388-170-0
- Snowmobile Adventures: The Incredible Canadian Success Story from Bombardier to the Villeneuves. Altitude, 2003. ISBN 1-55153-954-3
- Teacher's Guide for Snowmobile Challenge and Amazing Stories: Snowmobile Adventures. Altitude, 2006. ISBN 0-9734387-1-1
- Guide to Becoming a Library Technician. ICDC Publishing, 2002. ISBN 1881119-12-3
- Instructor's Guide to Becoming a Library Technician. ICDC Publishing, 2002. ISBN 1-881119-14X
