= Barbara Klar =

Canadian poet (born 1966)

- Born: 1966 (age 59–60); Saskatoon, Saskatchewan, Canada
- Occupation: poet
- Writing career
- Period: 1990s–present
- Notable work: The Night You Called Me a Shadow

Barbara Klar (born 1966 in Saskatoon, Saskatchewan) is a Canadian poet, who won the Gerald Lampert Award in 1994 for her poetry collection The Night You Called Me a Shadow.

After completing high school, Klar took writing courses at Fort San before completing a degree in English at the University of Saskatchewan. She published poetry in literary magazines such as Grain, Border Crossings and Prairie Fire before The Night You Called Me a Shadow was published in 1993. The book also won the Saskatchewan Writers Guild Poetry Award.

She has since followed up with three further poetry collections, The Blue Field (1999), Tower Road (2004), and Cypress (2008). Both The Blue Field and Cypress were shortlisted for the Saskatchewan Book Award. She won a Joseph S. Stauffer Prize from the Canada Council in 2004.
