= Archie Crail =

South African-Canadian writer

- Born: 1948 (age 77–78); Paarl, South Africa
- Occupations: journalist, short story writer, playwright
- Writing career
- Period: 1990s
- Notable work: The Bonus Deal

Archie Crail (born 1944 in Paarl, South Africa) is a South African-Canadian writer. He was a shortlisted nominee for the Governor General's Award for English-language fiction at the 1992 Governor General's Awards for his short story collection The Bonus Deal.

== Background ==
A coloured South African of Khoisan descent, Crail was born and raised in Paarl. Educated at the University of South Africa, he was an anti-apartheid activist with the African National Congress, and studied theology under Desmond Tutu. He later spent several years living in South-West Africa, continuing his political activism with SWAPO, and briefly moved to Botswana before moving to Canada in 1980.

Crail and his family settled in Regina, Saskatchewan in 1980. Crail took classes at the University of Regina, including studying creative writing under Ven Begamudré.

== Writing ==
His first work, a theatrical play titled Exile, won the Saskatchewan Writers' Guild literary competition in 1989 and was produced by Saskatoon's 25th Street Theatre in 1990. A touring production of Exile was later mounted in South Africa.

The Bonus Deal was published by Coteau Books in 1992. Several of the short stories in The Bonus Deal were also dramatized for CBC Radio.

In 1991, after the South African government lifted its ban on exiled African National Congress members returning to South Africa, Crail attended the organization's conference in Durban.

== Works ==
- Exile (1990)
- The Bonus Deal (1992)
