= Valerie Compton =

Canadian writer and journalist

Valerie Compton (born 1963) is a Canadian writer and journalist. Compton grew up in Bangor, Prince Edward Island and studied at the University of King's College. She has lived in Edmonton, Calgary, and Rothesay, New Brunswick. Compton has been writing short fiction for over twenty years, has written one novel, writes nonfiction articles, and works as a freelance editor and mentor to emerging writers. She now lives in Halifax, Nova Scotia.

== Writing ==
Author of the novel Tide Road (Goose Lane Editions, 2011) which was named a best book of 2011 by the Telegraph-Journal.

Compton's short fiction has been published in The Malahat Review, The New Quarterly, Riddle Fence, Grain, echolocation, Room, The Dalhousie Review, The Antigonish Review and the anthology Riptides: New Island Fiction.

Her nonfiction articles and reviews have been published in The Globe and Mail, The National Post, The Ottawa Citizen, Gourmet, The Edmonton Journal, The Calgary Herald, Quill & Quire, and The Winnipeg Review, among other periodicals.

== Awards ==
Tide Road was a finalist for the 2012 Thomas Head Raddall Atlantic Fiction Award.

Compton has been shortlisted twice for the CBC Literary Awards and has an Island Literary Award for Bluebird People in 2006.
