= Martha Blum =

Canadian writer (1913–2007)

Martha Blum (June 30, 1913 – December 12, 2007) was an Austro-Hungarian Empire-born Canadian writer.

== Biography ==
The daughter of Abraham Guttmann and Susi Herschmann, she was born Martha Guttmann in Czernowitz, Austria and grew up there. Czernowitz became part of Romania at the end of World War I. She studied pharmacy and chemistry at the Charles University in Prague, at the Pasteur Institute in Paris and at the University of Strasbourg in France. When Germany invaded her country in the early 1940s, she was held in a labour camp. At the end of World War II, she went to Israel with her husband Richard Blum and her daughter Irene. In 1951, Blum came to Canada. The family settled in Saskatoon, Saskatchewan in 1954. She worked as a pharmacist and vocal coach.

In 1999, at the age of 86, she published her first novel, The Walnut Tree, based on her experiences during the war and afterwards. It won the Saskatchewan Book Award and the Brenda MacDonald Riches First Book Award. In 2003, she published a collection of short stories Children of Paper. Blum published a novel in 2006, The Apothecary, which continued the stories of characters from her first novel. In November 2006, Martha received an Honorary Doctorate of Letters from the University of Saskatchewan.

She died of heart failure at the age of 94.
