= Andréa Ledding =

- Education: University of Saskatchewan
- Occupations: Playwright, poet, editor
- Children: 7

Andréa Ledding is a Métis nonfiction writer, playwright, poet and editor who lives in Saskatoon, Saskatchewan.

== Biography ==
Andréa Ledding attained an MFA in Writing from the University of Saskatchewan as part of the inaugural cohort of 2011. Her work was included the Canada's Best Poetry of 2011 anthology.

In 2012, Ledding's play Dominion debuted in Toronto. The play subsequently ran in Gordon Tootoosis Nikanawin Theatre in Saskatoon, where it was nominated for an "Outstanding Script" Saskatoon and Area Theatre Award.

Ledding is the Director of Communications of the Sixties Scoop Healing Foundation. She is on the board of the Saskatchewan Aboriginal Writers Circle.

She has seven children.

== Awards ==
Ledding was awarded the 2022 Constance Rooke Creative Nonfiction Prize by The Malahat Review.

She was the recipient of Anvil Press/subTerrain Magazine's Lush Triumphant Poetry Award for 2010.

In 2011, Ledding received third place in the John V. Hicks Long Manuscript Awards. In the same year, she was awarded the John V. Hicks Long Manuscript Award for Poetry for her poetry manuscript Braid and the same award for her non-fiction manuscript on the subject of Batoche.

Ledding has also been shortlisted for The Malahat Review's Far Horizons Award for Poetry and the CBC Literary Prize.

== Selected works ==
=== Dramatic works ===
- Dominion (2012)

=== Essays ===
- Define Intervention (2022)
- Pockets of our Hearts (2011)

=== Poetry ===
- Braid (2011)
- kîwetinotahk pimâcihowin - northern journeys (2016)
