= Connie Gault =

Canadian novelist, playwright and short story writer

- Born: Connie Hatley; March 6, 1949 (age 77); Central Butte, Saskatchewan
- Occupation: writer
- Spouse: Gordon Gault
- Writing career
- Period: 1980s–present
- Notable works: Sky, Euphoria, A Beauty

Connie Gault (born March 6, 1949) is a Canadian novelist, playwright and short story writer. She is best known for her novel A Beauty, which was a longlisted nominee for the 2015 Scotiabank Giller Prize.

== Background ==
Born Connie Hatley in Central Butte, Saskatchewan, she was raised in Ontario, Quebec and Alberta by parents in the Royal Canadian Air Force. Her family later settled back in Moose Jaw, Saskatchewan, where she later married her husband Gordon Gault. They moved to Regina in 1974, where Connie Gault received a degree from the University of Regina in 1984.

== Writing ==
Gault published her first short story in Grain in 1981. She has since published two volumes of short stories, as well as publishing stories in literary magazines and anthologies. Her debut short story collection Some of Eve's Daughters won a Saskatchewan Writers' Guild award, and her second collection Inspection of a Small Village won a City of Regina Book Award.

Her plays have been produced by theatre companies in Saskatchewan and Alberta, and have been broadcast on CBC Radio and the BBC World Service.

Her first novel Euphoria was published by Coteau Books in 2009, and won that year's Saskatchewan Book Award. A Beauty followed in 2015.

She was also a fiction editor of Grain in the 1990s.

== Works ==
=== Short story collections ===
- Some of Eve's Daughters (1987)
- Inspection of a Small Village (1996)

=== Plays ===
- Sky (1989)
- The Soft Eclipse (1990)
- Otherwise Bob (1999)
- Red Lips (2002)

=== Novels ===
- Euphoria (2009)
- A Beauty (2015)
