= Steven Ross Smith =

Canadian poet

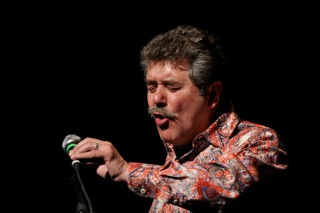
- Smith performing at the 2010 Calgary International Spoken Word Festival
- Born: June 25, 1945 (age 81); Toronto, Ontario, Canada
- Education: Ryerson Polytechnical Institute
- Occupations: Poet, sound poet, fiction and non-fiction writer, arts journalist, editor.
- Writing career
- Period: 1972 to present
- Genres: Poetry, fiction, arts journalism
- Notable works: fluttertongue Book 1, The Book of Games (1998); fluttertongue Book 2, The Book of Emmett (1999); fluttertongue 3: disarray (2005); fluttertongue 4: adagio for the pressured surround (2007); fluttertongue 5: Everything Appears to Shine with Mossy Splendour (2011); "Emanations: Fluttertongue 6".

Steven Ross Smith (born June 25, 1945) is a Canadian poet, sound poet, fiction writer, arts journalist and arts activist. He is best known for his fluttertongue poems, which have been published in six volumes. One of them, fluttertongue 3: disarray, won the 2005 Book of the Year Award at the Saskatchewan Book Awards. The fluttertongue poems have been described as a dance with words that pushes the boundaries of both language and poetry.

Smith is also known for his vigorous live performances of sound poetry. He has contributed to more than a dozen recordings including Homo Sonorous: An International Anthology of Sound Poetry released by the National Centre for Contemporary Arts, Kaliningrad, Russia, (2001), Revolutions, A Compilation of Saskatchewan Sound Works, (2000) and Carnivocal: A Celebration of Sound Poetry (1999). From 1992 to 2000, Smith performed with DUCT, the improvisatory sound and music ensemble he founded. He was also a member of the sound/performance ensemble Owen Sound from 1975 to 1985.

Smith's poetry first appeared in 1972 in the blewointment press anthology, what isint tantrik speshul, and his first chapbook, White Cycle, came out in 1977. In all, he has published nine books of poetry and two volumes of fiction. In 2006, Smith also published a collection of his newspaper profiles of 40 Saskatchewan artists. In 2015 he published "Emanations: Fluttertongue 6" with Toronto's BookThug.

In 1996 and 1997, Smith served as writer-in-residence at the Saskatoon Public Library. From 1990 to 2008, he was Executive Director of the Sage Hill Writing Experience, a ten-day summer school in Saskatchewan for professional writers. Smith was Director of Literary Arts at the Banff Centre from 2008 to 2014. Since June 2018 he has been Banff Poet Laureate, both in Banff and as of 2020, at-large, carrying out initiatives for Banff and beyond, from Saskatoon, Saskatchewan where he now lives.

== Beginnings ==
Steven Ross Smith was born in Toronto in 1945, and grew up in the city's Parkdale neighborhood. He attended Ryerson Polytechnical Institute, (now Toronto Metropolitan University), where he obtained a diploma in Radio and Television Arts in 1968.

In 1971, he saw and heard a performance by a sound poetry group called The Four Horsemen consisting of bpNichol, Steve McCaffery, Rafael Barreto-Rivera and Paul Dutton. The performance was a turning point in Smith's creative development. He began to explore sound poetry and became friends with Nichol and Dutton. In 1975, he formed Owen Sound along with Richard Truhlar, Michael Dean and David Penhale.

The group dedicated itself to sound and performance poetry as well as collaborative composition. It performed in and outside Toronto and collaborated with other poets and musicians in a series of public performances, including appearances at the 10th International Festival of Sound Poetry in Amsterdam in 1977, and the 11th International Festival at Toronto's St. Lawrence Centre for the Arts in 1978.
