= Geoffrey Ursell =

Canadian writer (1943–2021)

- Born: March 14, 1943; Moose Jaw, Saskatchewan
- Died: February 21, 2021 (aged 77); Saskatoon, Saskatchewan
- Occupations: playwright, novelist, poet
- Spouse: Barbara Sapergia
- Writing career
- Years active: 1970s-2021
- Notable works: Perdue, or How the West Was Lost, Saskatoon Pie

Geoffrey Ursell (March 14, 1943 – February 21, 2021) was a Canadian writer, who won the Books in Canada First Novel Award in 1985 for his novel Perdue, or How the West Was Lost.

== Career ==
Predominantly known as a playwright, Ursell's stage and musical plays included The Running of the Deer (1981), Saskatoon Pie (1982), The Willowbunch Giant (1983), The Secret Life of Railroaders (1986), The Rum Runners of Rainbow Ravine (1990), The Park (1994), Deer Bring the Sun (1998), Gold on Ice (2003), Winning the Prairie Gamble (2005), The Walnut Tree (2010) and Dead Midnight (2011). He also adapted The Rum Runners of Rainbow Ravine as a CBC Radio drama, and wrote the teleplay Distant Battles for CBC Television.

With his wife Barbara Sapergia and colleagues Bob Currie and Gary Hyland, Ursell was a cofounder of Coteau Books in the 1970s. In 1987, Ursell and Sapergia pitched a series to CBC Television called Midnight in Moose Jaw, a sitcom-variety hybrid set in a Prohibition-era speakeasy which would have centred around live performances by real comedians and musicians, with Jenny Jones and Colin James as the guest performers in the pilot. The series was not picked up by the CBC.

His other published books included the poetry collections Trap Lines (1982), The Look-Out Tower (1989) and Jumbo Gumbo: Songs, Poems, and Stories for Children (1990), and the short story collection Way Out West (1990).

He served as president of the Saskatchewan Writers' Guild and the Saskatchewan Playwrights' Centre, was writer-in-residence for the Saskatoon Public Library and the Winnipeg Public Library, was an editor of the literary magazine Grain, and taught literature and creative writing at the University of Regina.
