= Harlo Jones =

Canadian military aviator (1923–2005)

Harlo Lloyd Jones (December 29, 1923 – October 1, 2005) was a World War II bomber pilot with the Royal Canadian Air Force (RCAF).

Born in Dinsmore, Saskatchewan to a prominent family (Harlo's father Luther Jones owned several businesses, including Dinsmore's first power plant), young Harlo was known by the nickname "Squirt" because of his small stature. His older brother, RCAF pilot Dale Jones, was shot down and killed in 1940 during the Battle of Dunkirk. Undeterred, Harlo was eager to join the RCAF as soon as he was of age. Refused twice at the Saskatoon recruiting center because of his small size, he was eventually accepted with a recorded weight of 118 pounds and a height of 5 feet, 10 inches.

After training at various sites across Canada he was assigned to 408 Squadron of 6 RCAF Group, RAF Bomber Command at RAF Linton-on-Ouse, Yorkshire. Harlo flew Avro Lancaster and Handley Page Halifax bombers in 32 sorties against targets in Germany and Occupied Europe. His final sortie was on December 5, 1944, just days before his 21st birthday. He was subsequently awarded the Distinguished Flying Cross, promoted to Flight Lieutenant, and released of his duties.

He returned to Canada where he joined the Geological Survey of Canada, working with a crew in the bush north of Flin Flon, Manitoba. He married Ethel Cloake, a nurse, in 1946. He earned a Bachelor of Arts at the University of British Columbia and worked as a reporter for the Vancouver Sun, and later, the Edmonton Bulletin. He rejoined the RCAF in 1950 and served for another 20 years before managing a hospital in Winnipeg.

Harlo published the first of his two memoirs in 1995. O Little Town: Remembering Life in a Prairie Village detailed his childhood in Dinsmore. Bomber Pilot: A Canadian Youth's War followed in 2001, in which he recounted his days as a bomber pilot in World War II.

Harlo Jones died on October 1, 2005, in Winnipeg, Manitoba after suffering a stroke.
