= Miguel A. Fenrich =

Sudanese-Canadian journalist (born 2002)

Photo of Miguel Fenrich, September 2025, in Saskatoon, Sask.

Miguel A. Fenrich (2002) is a Sudanese-Canadian journalist, photographer, and author of speculative novels Blue: A Novel (2022) and the psychological horror novel What Lies in the Valley (2023). He has worked as a reporter, editor, publisher, and communications manager in the province's cultural and non-profit sectors. His work often explores culture, heritage, or the Saskatchewan prairies through an intersectional and anti-racist lens.

Fenrich has received nine Saskatchewan Weekly Newspaper Awards, five in 2023 and four in 2024. On January 19, 2023, he was recognized with the Queen Elizabeth II Platinum Jubilee Medal for his publishing company, Supernova Press, and in 2024 he was recognized by SK Arts as an Emerging Artist for his contributions to the arts.

As of 2025, he is the President of the Saskatchewan Writers' Guild.

== Early life and education ==
Fenrich was born in 2002 in the Battlefords, and is of German and Sudanese heritage. He is a home-schooled Canadian novelist, reporter and photographer who, in 2023 worked and lived on a farm near Wilkie, Saskatchewan. He began drafting fiction in his teens; his debut novel Blue was written during the COVID-19 pandemic, as a young adult.

== Career ==
=== Journalism and communications ===
Fenrich first worked as a reporter for the Battlefords Regional News-Optimist, a newspaper serving North Battleford and area. He later contributed reporting and long-form features to the online outlet SaskToday.ca, including investigative and explanatory series under the "Behind the Headlines" banner that examined topics such as crime, Indigenous street gangs and public perceptions of the Battlefords, and worked as editor for the Battlefords Regional News-Optimist.

Alongside journalism, Fenrich has worked in the non-profit and cultural sectors. He worked as Communications Coordinator at the Multicultural Council of Saskatchewan (MCoS). In April 2025, SaskMusic announced that he had been hired as its Marketing & Communications Manager, responsible for overseeing the organization's marketing, social media channels, websites and communications for their music programs and services in the province.

=== Publishing and Supernova Press ===
Fenrich is the founder and former owner–publisher of Supernova Press, a micro publishing company based in the Battlefords region that focused on genre and "high-concept" fiction.

== Works of fiction ==
=== Blue: A Novel ===
Fenrich's debut novel, Blue: A Novel, was published by Supernova Press in June 2022.

The book is set roughly forty-five years in the future and imagines a society in which people with blue eyes are considered inferior and subjected to systemic discrimination and coerced labour under a brown-eyed ruling class. The central character, Wolfe, is an enslaved blue-eyed worker purchased by a wealthy plantation owner, who becomes entangled in a plot that could transform the status of millions of oppressed people.

=== What Lies in the Valley ===
Fenrich's second novel, What Lies in the Valley, is a historical psychological horror novel set in the late 1920s on the Canadian Prairies and was published in January 2023.

The story follows Klara and her family, who flee to Canada after a series of tragedies in Europe and move into a seemingly supernatural ancestral home in the fictional Foxtail Valley. The house is associated with a child-stealing entity known as "the Watcher" and other paranormal phenomena.

==== 273 Days ====
Fenrich is currently working on a novel tentatively titled 273 Days, with support from SK Arts.
