= Coteau Books =

Defunct Canadian non-profit literary press

- Status: Closed
- Founded: 1975; 50 years ago
- Founder: Bob Currie, Gary Hyland, Barbara Sapergia and Geoffrey Ursell
- Defunct: February 2020; 5 years ago
- Country of origin: Canada
- Headquarters location: Regina, Saskatchewan, Canada
- Distribution: Publishers Group Canada (Canada); John Reed Books (Australia); Orca Book Publishers (US)
- Publication types: Books
- Official website: coteaubooks.com

Coteau Books was a small, non-profit literary press based in Regina, Saskatchewan, Canada. It was established in 1975 by Bob Currie, Gary Hyland, Barbara Sapergia and Geoffrey Ursell when they realized that there was little opportunity for Saskatchewan writers to get published, especially first-time authors. The press closed its doors and entered bankruptcy protection in February 2020.

Coteau Books grew considerably since its 1975 founding, publishing 16 books a year, from authors across Canada, and adding a substantial and high-profile "young readers" element to its list. Coteau distributed its books to Canada, the US, Australia and New Zealand, and around the world on the internet. It also had rights representation for its titles in most parts of the world. It published authors from all over Canada, and was short listed for or won many literary awards in the country, including the prestigious Governor General's Literary Awards (which Coteau's Gloria Sawai won in 2001 for her short story collection A Song for Nettie Johnson). Coteau had books named GG finalists seven times, in four different genres, which is a rare accomplishment for a press of its size.

Writers published by the firm included Mark Abley, Linda Aksomitis, Sharon Butala, Warren Cariou, Archie Crail, Deborah Ellis, Connie Gault, Wendy Phillips, Armand Garnet Ruffo, Linda Smith, Anne Szumigalski, Curtis Gillespie and Duncan Thornton.
