= Eleanor Brass =

Canadian writer (1905–1992)

- Eleanor Brass, from a 1956 newspaper
- Born: May 1, 1905; Peepeekisis Reserve, Saskatchewan
- Died: May 20, 1992 (age 87 years); Regina, Saskatchewan
- Occupations: Writer, government official, puppeteer
- Notable work: I Walk in Two Worlds (1987)

Eleanor Dieter Brass (May 1, 1905 – May 20, 1992) was a Canadian writer of Cree and Saulteaux origins. She was an advocate for First Nations youth, and wrote about her community's traditions and history, especially in her autobiography, I Walk in Two Worlds (1987).

== Early life ==
Eleanor Dieter was born on the Peepeekisis Cree Nation reserve in Saskatchewan, the daughter of Frederick Charles Dieter and Marybelle Cote. Her great-grandfather was Chief Gabriel Cote. Her parents had both attended residential schools. She recalled many instances of abusive treatment at the File Hills residential school, and later attended a high school in Canora, but did not graduate.

== Career ==
Brass, a provincial official working on employment and housing issues, was the first woman to serve as secretary-treasurer of the Association of Indians of Saskatchewan, when she assumed that post in 1944. She was also a receptionist and teacher at the Regina YWCA. She wrote a column, "Breaking the Barriers", for The Regina Leader, beginning in 1949. She wrote another column, "Teepee Tidings", for the Melville Advance. She helped to set up Native Friendship Centres in cities, to welcome First Nations young people to transition from rural to urban life.

In retirement, she was director of the Peace River Friendship Centre, and wrote a monthly column, "Eleanor's North", for Alberta Native Communication. She wrote three books (the last, Off the Buckskin, was left unfinished at the time of her death). In 1991 she received an honorary doctorate from the University of Toronto, in recognition of her community work and writings. In 2021, a new edition of her first book was published, with new illustrations by Aleigha Agecoutay, and a new title, under the supervision of her niece, Patricia Dieter-McArthur.

== Publications ==
- "Indians no longer reticent in future role" (1967)
- Medicine Boy and Other Cree Tales (folktales, 1978, 1982)
- I Walk in Two Worlds (autobiography, 1987)
- peepeekisis ātayōhkēwina = Sacred Stories of Peepeekisis Cree Nation (2021)

== Personal life ==
Dieter married fellow Peepeekisis Cree Nation member Alexander Hector Brass in 1925. Her husband died in 1965, and Eleanor Brass died in 1992, aged 87 years, in Regina.
