= Mark Steven Morton =

Canadian writer

Mark Morton
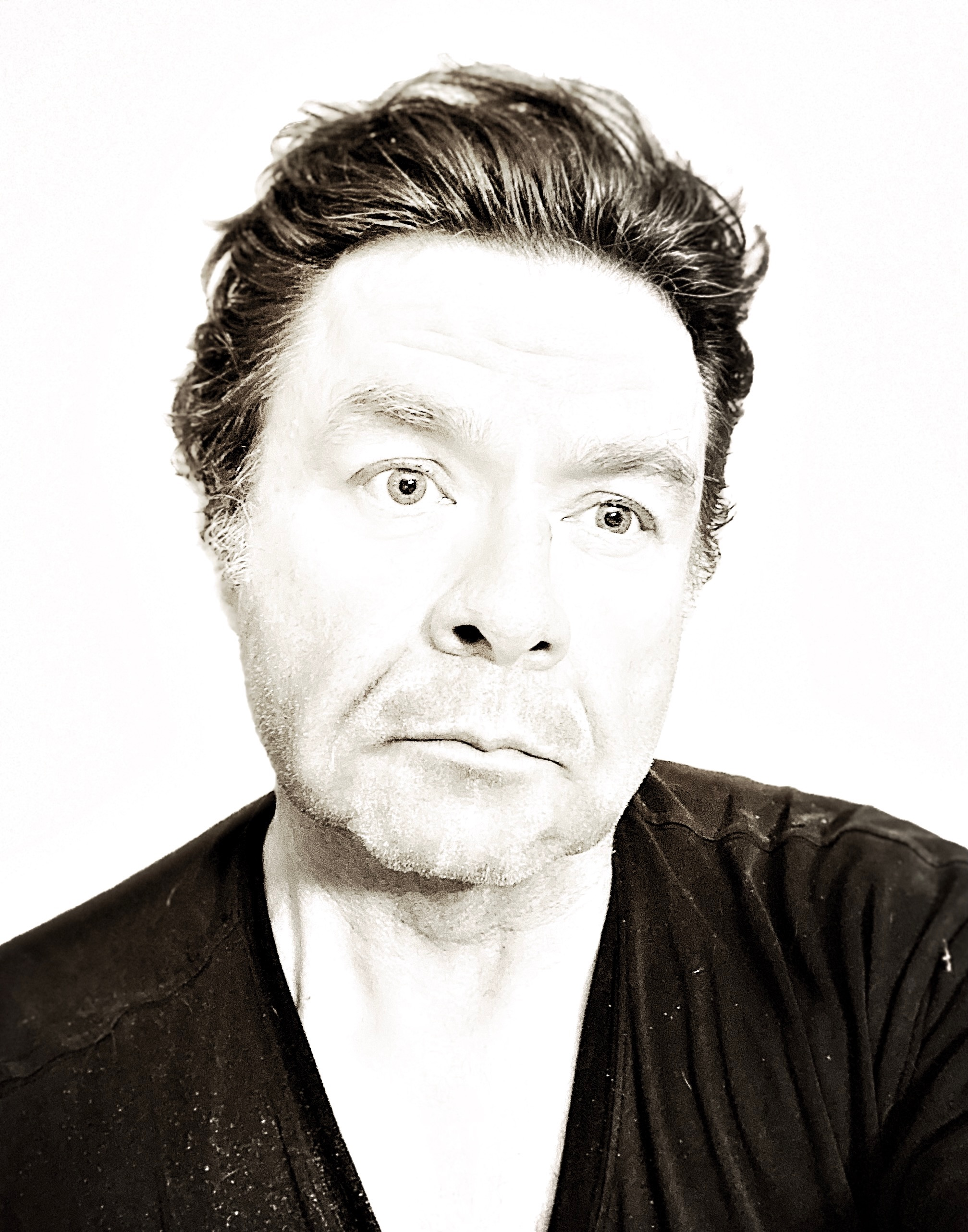
- Mark Morton, 2022
- Born: December 31, 1963 (age 62); Weyburn, Saskatchewan, Canada
- Education: PhD Early Modern English Literature
- Alma mater: University of Toronto, PhD 1992
- Website: markmorton.notion.site

Mark Morton (born 1963) is a Canadian author. He is best known for non-fiction books and articles on language, history, and food culture. He is also the co-founder of the Winnipeg International Writers Festival and a former writer and broadcaster for CBC Radio One.

== Biography ==
Morton was born in Weyburn, Saskatchewan, and grew up on a small grain and cattle farm in that province. He attended the University of Regina for a BA and then the University of Toronto for an MA and PhD in Early Modern English Literature, focusing on The Faerie Queene by Edmund Spenser.

== Awards ==
- Winner of the 2025 Arlene Barlin Award for Science Fiction and Fantasy
- Nominee for the 1997 Julia Child Award in the Food Reference/Technical category (Calphalon Award)
- Winner of the 2003 Alexander Kennedy Isbister Award for Non-Fiction

== Publications ==
Morton has written four non-fiction books on topics pertaining to language, history, and food culture: Cupboard Love; The End; The Lover's Tongue; and Cooking with Shakespeare. From 2001 to 2012, he was also a regular contributor to Gastronomica: The Journal of Food and Culture, in which he published more than 50 articles. Morton has written one novel: The Headmasters.

=== Cupboard Love ===
Cupboard Love: A Dictionary of Culinary Curiosities (Bain & Cox, 1996) explores the etymological origins of more than a 1000 English words pertaining to food, cooking, and eating. The entry for "pomegranate," for example, explains how that word derives from the same Latin source as "grenade" and "granite," while the entry for "souffle" shows how that word is related to "flatulence" through a shared Proto-Indo-European root that meant "to blow."

In 2003, Cupboard Love was translated into Czech and published by Volvox Globator (Prague) as Nadívaný pštros. A second and expanded edition was published by Insomniac Press in 2004, and a third edition by Shadowpaw Press in 2025. It was one of three books nominated for a 1996 Julia Child Cookbook Award in the Food Reference/Technical Category (Calphalon Award).

The Atlantic commented that the book "lays out the histories of hundreds of food-related terms as deftly and completely as any casual reader could wish." Cupboard Love was also reviewed or cited in The Globe and Mail, Choice Reviews, The London Free Press, The Edmonton Journal, The Hamilton Spectator, The Winnipeg Free Press, and Publishers Weekly.

=== The End ===
The End: Closing Words for a Millennium (Bain & Cox, 1999, co-authored with Gail Noble) draws from hundreds of primary sources such as newspaper articles, letters, diaries, poems, plays, and sheet music to explore how people living at the ends of previous centuries celebrated or thought about the end of their own century (or the beginning of their new one). The Toronto Star commented that "Although most of The End is a sort of narrated anthology of centuries-old newspaper articles, letters, diaries and the like, Morton and Noble's introduction is a short history in all things millennial.

=== The Lover's Tongue ===
The Lover's Tongue: A Merry Romp Through the Language of Love and Sex [Dirty Words in the UK] (Insomniac Press, 2003) explores the origins of English words and phrases pertaining to love and sex. In the UK it was published by Atlantic Books as Dirty Words: The Story of Sex Talk. The Guardian noted that "no other book that offers such a compendious and up-to-date trove of erotic etymology.” The Lover's Tongue was also reviewed or cited in The Times (London), The Globe and Mail, and The National Post,

=== Cooking with Shakespeare ===
Cooking with Shakespeare (Greenwood Press, 2008) explores food culture in Shakespeare's England: what was eaten, how it was cooked and served, how different classes ate different foods, customs at the dining table, and so on. It include sixteenth-century recipes in facsimile and in modern renderings. Choice Reviews noted that Cooking with Shakespeare "ventures beyond literature and cookery into history, etymology, and sciences. Thorough, exemplary, logical, and unflinchingly authentic, the volume is a labor of love and thoughtful scholarship."

=== The Headmasters ===
The Headmasters (Shadowpaw Press, 2024) is a young adult, dystopian novel set in northern Ontario. A review in the Winnipeg Free Press noted that "The Headmasters is a worthy companion to books such as Margaret Atwood’s The Handmaid’s Tale and John Wyndham’s The Chrysalids." The Headmasters was the winner of the 2025 Arlene Barlin Award for Science Fiction and Fantasy.

== Broadcasting ==
Between 1993 and 2005, Morton wrote and broadcast more than a hundred columns pertaining to language and pop culture for CBC Radio One, initially on CBC Winnipeg's morning show and later on the national weekly program Definitely Not the Opera. He also wrote and broadcast an hour-long documentary about the last day of the nineteenth century.
