= Anne Szumigalski =

Canadian poet (1922–1999)

Anne Szumigalski SOM
- Born: Anne Howard Davis; 3 January 1922; London, England
- Died: 22 April 1999 (aged 77); Saskatoon, Canada
- Spouse: Jan Szumigalski (1946–1985)
- Children: 4
- Writing career
- Genre: Poetry
- Notable awards: Saskatchewan Order of Merit, Governor General's Award

Anne Szumigalski, SOM (b. 3 January 1922 in London, England, d. 22 April 1999) was a Canadian poet.

== Life ==
She was born Anne Howard Davis in London, England, and grew up mostly in a Hampshire village. She served with the Red Cross as a medical auxiliary officer and interpreter during World War II, following British Army forces in 1944-5 across parts of newly liberated Europe. In 1946, she married Jan Szumigalski, (d. 1985) a former officer in the Polish Army, and lived with him in north Wales before immigrating to Canada in 1951. They had four children: Kate (born 1946), Elizabeth (1947), Tony (1961) and Mark (1963). She spent the rest of her life in Saskatchewan, first in the remote Big Muddy valley, then in Saskatoon.

== Writing career ==
Most of her fifteen books are collections of poetry, but she also wrote a memoir, The Voice, the Word, the Text (1990) as well as Z., a play about the Holocaust. Her first book, Woman Reading in Bath (1974), was published by Doubleday in New York. Thereafter she made the deliberate choice to publish her work with Canadian presses. She helped found the Saskatchewan Writers Guild and the literary journal Grain, and served as a mentor to many younger writers.

Szumigalski combined a love of the Canadian Prairies with a passion for language, a faith in poetry and an intimate knowledge of literary tradition. She was a great admirer of William Blake, some of whose visionary qualities appear in her own work.

Her finest work is collected in a big volume of selected poems, On Glassy Wings (Coteau, 1997). In 2006 her literary executor Mark Abley edited a volume of her posthumous poems, When Earth Leaps Up. A final posthumous book is expected in 2010.

The Manitoba Writers Guild has set up a scholarship in her name. The Saskatchewan Book Award for Poetry is named for her. Her papers are held at the University of Regina, and University of Saskatchewan.

== Awards ==
In 1989, she was awarded the Saskatchewan Order of Merit. Her 1995 collection Voice, featuring paintings by Marie Elyse St. George, won the Governor General's Award for English language poetry. She also received many other honours over the years.

== Works ==
=== Memoirs ===
- A Woman Clothed in Words. Regina: Coteau Books, 2012
- The word, the voice, the text: the life of a writer. Saskatoon: Fifth House, 1990 ISBN 978-0-920079-65-2

=== Plays ===
- Z, Coteau Books, 1995 ISBN 978-1-55050-080-6, (a play about the Holocaust).

=== Poetry ===
- A Peeled Wand: Selected Poems of Anne Szumigalski Winnipeg: Signature Editions, 2011. ISBN 978-1-897109-47-2 (posthumous poems)
- When Earth Leaps Up. London: Brick Books, 2006. ISBN 978-1-894078-52-8 (posthumous poems)
- Sermons on stones: words and images. Saskatoon: Hagios Press, 1997. ISBN 978-0-9682256-0-8
- On glassy wings: poems new & selected. Regina: Coteau Books, 1997. ISBN 978-1-55050-114-8
- Voice. with Marie Elyse St. George. Regina: Coteau Books, 1995. ISBN 978-1-55050-089-9
- Why couldn't you see blue? Caroline Heath. edited by Anne Szumigalski. Regina: Coteau Books, 1994. ISBN 978-1-55050-064-6
- Rapture of the deep. paintings by G.N. Louise Jonasson. Regina: Coteau Books, 1991. ISBN 978-1-55050-023-3
- Journey/journée. with Terrence Heath and drawings and wood engravings by Jim Westergard. Red Deer, Alta.: Red Deer College Press, 1988. ISBN 978-0-88995-029-0
- Dogstones: selected and new poems. Saskatoon: Fifth House, 1986. ISBN 978-0-920079-21-8
- Heading out: the new Saskatchewan poets. edited by Don Kerr and Anne Szumigalski. Coteau Books, ISBN 978-0-919926-58-5
- Jaw, Sask.: Coteau Books, 1986.
- Instar: poems and stories. Red Deer, Alta.: RDC Press, 1985. ISBN 978-0-88995-024-5
- Risks: a poem. illustrations by Jim Westergard. Red Deer, Alta.: RDC Press, 1983. ISBN 978-0-88995-023-8
- Doctrine of signatures. Saskatoon: Fifth House, 1983. ISBN 978-0-920079-00-3
- A game of angels. Winnipeg: Turnstone Press, 1980. ISBN 978-0-88801-044-5
- Wild man's butte: a stereophonic poem. with Terrence Heath. Moose Jaw, Sask.: Coteau Books, 1979.
- Thunder Creek Pub. Co-operative, 1979.
- Woman reading in bath: poems. Toronto: Doubleday Canada; Garden City, N.Y.: Doubleday, 1974. ISBN 978-0-385-02743-4
