= 2015 in poetry =

Nationality words link to articles with information on the nation's poetry or literature (for instance, Irish or France).

== Events ==
- September 8 – In the 2015 edition of Best American Poetry, the inclusion of a poem by Michael Derrick Hudson, a white American poet from Fort Wayne, Indiana, who claims he used the Asian female pseudonym Yi-Fen Chou to get the poem published, causes considerable debate and criticism on the issue of identity politics and cultural appropriation.
- September 15 – Juan Felipe Herrera, the first Latino to serve as U.S. poet laureate, gives his inaugural reading.
- November 10 – The Bodleian Library at the University of Oxford in England acquires its twelve millionth book, a unique copy of Shelley's subversive Poetical Essay on the Existing State of Things, "By a Gentleman of the University of Oxford," published in 1811.
- November 17 – the General Court of Abha in Saudi Arabia sentences Palestinian poet Ashraf Fayadh to death for apostasy. Used as evidence against him were several poems within his book Instructions Within, Twitter posts, and conversations he had in a coffee shop in Abha.

== Anniversaries ==
- January 4 – On this day 50 years ago, Anglo-American poet T. S. Eliot dies.
- April 23 – On this day 100 years ago, English poet Rupert Brooke dies on active service.
- June – In this month 100 years ago, T. S. Eliot's "The Love Song of J. Alfred Prufrock" is published.
- June 13 – The 150th anniversary of W. B. Yeats, who was born on this date in 1865.
- October 7 – The 60th anniversary of Allen Ginsberg's reading of his poem Howl, first performed at the Six Gallery in San Francisco on this day in 1955.

== Selection of works published in English ==
=== Africa ===
- Ijeoma Umebinyuo, Questions for Ada, Nigerian author

=== Australia ===
- Jane Godwin, The True Story of Mary

==== Anthologies in Australia ====
- Albiston, Jordie & Brophy, Kevin (eds.), Prayers of a Secular World, Inkerman & Blunt Publishers. ISBN 978-0-9875-4019-5
- Beveridge, Judith & Ogle, Susan (eds.), Falling and Flying: Poems on Ageing, Brandl & Schlesinger. ISBN 978-1-9215-5687-6
- Page, Geoff (ed.), The Best Australian Poems 2015, Black Inc. ISBN 978-1-9252-0365-3

=== Canada ===
- Liz Howard, Infinite Citizen of the Shaking Tent
- Soraya Peerbaye, Tell
- Holly Bodger, 5 to 1

=== New Zealand ===
==== Poets in Best New Zealand Poems ====
These poets wrote the 25 poems selected for Best New Zealand Poems 2014 (guest editor was Vincent O'Sullivan), published this year:

- Peter Bland
- Amy Brown
- Geoff Cochrane
- Kay McKenzie Cooke
- John Dennison
- Cliff Fell
- Rogelio Guedea
- Dinah Hawken
- Caoilinn Hughes
- Kevin Ireland
- Anna Jackson
- Michael Jackson
- Michele Leggott
- Owen Marshall
- Emma Neale
- Gregory O'Brien
- Peter Olds
- Claire Orchard
- Nina Powles
- Joanna Preston
- Helen Rickerby
- Kerrin P Sharpe
- Marty Smith
- Elizabeth Smither
- Brian Turner

=== United Kingdom ===
==== England ====
- Mona Arshi, Small Hands
- Sarah Crossan, One (young adult novel in verse, Irish author published in UK)
- George the Poet, Search Party
- Thomas Grey (died 1928), Poems on the Great War
- Sarah Howe, Loop of Jade
- Clive James
  - Sentenced to Life
  - Latest Readings
- Bhanu Kapil, Ban en Banlieue
- Frances Leviston, Disinformation
  - Andrew McMillan, Physical
- Sean O'Brien, The Beautiful Librarians
- Sam Riviere, Kim Kardashian’s Marriage

==== Scotland ====
- Iain Banks, Poems. ISBN 1408705877
- Kathleen Jamie, The Bonniest Companie
- Robin Fulton Macpherson, A Northern Habitat: Collected Poems 1960-2010
- Don Paterson, 40 Sonnets (Faber)

=== United States ===
- Rae Armantrout, Itself
- Clayton Eshleman, The Essential Poetry (1960-2015)
- Terrance Hayes, How to Be Drawn
- Ernest Hilbert, Caligulan, Measure Press
- Robin Coste Lewis, Voyage of the Sable Venus and Other Poems
- Fred Moten, The Little Edges
- Veronica J. Valentini, Perseverance: A Collection of Poetry
- Tiphanie Yanique, Wife (published in England)

==== Criticism, scholarship and biography in the United States ====
- David Biespiel, A Long High Whistle: Selected Columns on Poetry (Antilever Press)
- David Schneider, Crowded by beauty: The Life and Zen of Poet Philip Whalen (University California Press)

==== Poets in The Best American Poetry 2015 ====
The 2015 edition of The Best American Poetry is guest-edited by Native American poet and novelist Sherman Alexie

== Works published in other languages ==
=== French ===
- Ultime recours, Une anthologie de la poésie francophone contemporaine des profondeurs
- Serge Venturini, Éclats d'une poétique des métamorphoses, Livre VII, (2013–2015) (Paris, L'Harmattan)

=== Italian ===
- Milo De Angelis, Incontri e agguati (Milano, Mondadori)
- Franco Buffoni, Avrei fatto la fine di Turing (Roma, Donzelli)
- Anna Maria Carpi, L'animato porto (Milano, La Vita Felice)
- Gianni D'Elia, Fiori del mare (Torino, Einaudi)
- Gio Evan, Teorema di un salto (StreetLib)
- Lia Galli, Non si muore più per un bacio (Viganello [Lugano], alla chiara fonte)
- Massimo Gezzi, Il numero dei vivi (Roma, Donzelli)
- Fabio Jermini, Corpi gabbia d’ali e unghie (Viganello [Lugano], alla chiara fonte)
- Jonathan Lupi, Agli istanti (Viganello [Lugano], alla chiara fonte)
- Giorgio Orelli, Tutte le poesie (Milano, Mondadori)
- Franco Marcoaldi, Il mondo sia lodato (Torino, Einaudi)
- Carlotta Silini, Igiene di vita (Viganello [Lugano], alla chiara fonte)

== Awards and honors by country ==
Awards announced this year:

=== International ===
- Glenna Luschei Prize for African Poetry:
  - Finalists are:
    - A Book of Rooms by Kobus Moolman
    - Gumiguru by Togara Muzanenhamo
    - Now the World Takes These Breaths by Joan Meterlerkamp
- Struga Poetry Evenings Golden Wreath Laureate:

=== Australia awards and honors ===
- C. J. Dennis Prize for Poetry:
- Kenneth Slessor Prize for Poetry:

=== Canada awards and honors ===
- Archibald Lampman Award: Shane Book, Congotronic
- Atlantic Poetry Prize: Susan Paddon, Two Tragedies in 429 Breaths
- 2014 Governor General's Awards: Robyn Sarah, My Shoes Are Killing Me (English); Joël Pourbaix, Le mal du pays est un art oublié (French)
- Griffin Poetry Prize: (Judges: Tim Bowling, Fanny Howe, Piotr Sommer)
  - Canada: Jane Munro, Blue Sonoma
  - International: Michael Longley, The Stairwell
  - Lifetime Recognition Award (presented by the Griffin trustees): Derek Walcott
- Latner Writers' Trust Poetry Prize: Karen Solie
- Gerald Lampert Award: Kayla Czaga, For Your Safety Please Hold On
- Pat Lowther Award: Sina Queyras, MxT
- Prix Alain-Grandbois: André Roy, La très grande solitude de l'écrivain pragois Franz Kafka
- Raymond Souster Award: Patrick Lane, Washita
- Dorothy Livesay Poetry Prize: Cecily Nicholson, From the Poplars
- Prix Émile-Nelligan: Rosalie Lessard, L'observatoire

=== France awards and honors ===
- Prix Goncourt de la Poésie:

=== Italian awards and honors ===
- Premio Letterario Camaiore:
  - Italy: Nicola Vacca, Luce nera (Milano, Marco Saya, 2015)
  - International: Claribel Alegría, Voci(Samuele Editore, 2015)
  - Special award: Franco Marcoaldi, Il mondo sia lodato (Torino, Einaudi, 2015)
  - Honorable mentions:
    - Italian poetry: Antonio Porta, Carmelo Pistillo Perché tu mi dici: poeta? (edited by Carmelo Pistillo & Fabio Jermini, Milano, La Vita Felice, 2015)
    - Russian Poetry: Solomon Volkov, Dialoghi con Josif Brodskij (edited by Gala Dobrynina, Roma, Lieto Colle, 2015)
  - Section "Vittorio Grotti": Davide Maria Quarracino, Frangiflutti (Roma, LietoColle, 2015)

=== New Zealand awards and honors ===
- Prime Minister's Awards for Literary Achievement:
- Montana New Zealand Book Awards (poetry category):

=== United Kingdom awards and honors ===
- Cholmondeley Award: Patience Agbabi, Brian Catling, Christopher Middleton, J. H. Prynne, Pascale Petit
- Costa Award (formerly "Whitbread Awards") for poetry:
  - Shortlist:
- English Association's Fellows' Poetry Prizes:
- Eric Gregory Award (for a collection of poems by a poet under the age of 30):
- Forward Poetry Prize:
  - Best Collection:
    - Shortlist:
  - Best First Collection:
    - Shortlist:
  - Best Poem:
    - Shortlist:
- Jerwood Aldeburgh First Collection Prize for poetry:
  - Shortlist:
- Manchester Poetry Prize:
- National Poet of Wales:
- National Poetry Competition 2015:
- T. S. Eliot Prize (United Kingdom and Ireland): Sarah Howe, Loop of Jade
  - Shortlist (announced in November 2015): 2015 Short List
- The Times/Stephen Spender Prize for Poetry Translation:

=== United States awards and honors ===
- Agnes Lynch Starrett Poetry Prize:
- AML Award for Poetry awarded to Hive by Christina Stoddard
  - Finalists: Glyphs by Colin Douglas, Lake of Fire: Landscape Meditations from the Great Basin Deserts of Nevada by Justin Evans, Let Me Drown With Moses by James Goldberg
- Arab American Book Award (The George Ellenbogen Poetry Award):
- Anisfield-Wolf Book Award: Marilyn Chin for Hard Love Province
- Best Translated Book Award (BTBA):
- Beatrice Hawley Award from Alice James Books:
- Bollingen Prize: to Nathaniel Mackey
- Dwarf Stars Award: Greg Schwartz, abandoned nursing home
- Elgin Award:
  - Marge Simon & Mary Turzillo, Sweet Poison (Book)
  - Mary McMyne, Wolf Skin (Chapbook)
- Jackson Poetry Prize:
  - Judges:
- Lambda Literary Award:
  - Gay Poetry: Danez Smith, [insert] boy
  - Lesbian Poetry: Valerie Wetlaufer, Mysterious Acts by My People
- Lenore Marshall Poetry Prize:
- Los Angeles Times Book Prize:
  - Finalists:
- National Book Award for Poetry (NBA)
  - NBA Longlist; Finalists (†); Winner
    - Ross Gay, Catalog of Unabashed Gratitude;†
    - Amy Gerstler, Scattered at Sea;
    - Marilyn Hacker, A Stranger’s Mirror: New and Selected Poems, 1994-2014;
    - Terrance Hayes, How to Be Drawn;†
    - Jane Hirshfield, The Beauty;
    - Robin Coste Lewis, Voyage of the Sable Venus;†
    - Ada Limón, Bright Dead Things;†
    - Patrick Phillips, Elegy for a Broken Machine;†
    - Rowan Ricardo Phillips, Heaven;
    - Lawrence Raab, Mistaking Each Other for Ghosts.
  - NBA Judges: Sherman Alexie, Willie Perdomo, Katha Pollitt, and Tim Seibles
- National Book Critics Circle Award for Poetry:
  - Finalists (Winner -)
    - Catalogue of Unabashed Gratitude by Ross Gay
    - How to Be Drawn by Terrance Hayes
    - Bright Dead Things by Ada Limón
    - Parallax: And Selected Poems by Sinéad Morrissey
    - What About This: Collected Poems of Frank Stanford by Frank Stanford
- The New Criterion Poetry Prize:
- Pulitzer Prize for Poetry (United States): Digest by Gregory Pardlo
  - Finalists: Reel to Reel by Alan Shapiro and Compass Rose by Arthur Sze
- Wallace Stevens Award: Joy Harjo
- Whiting Awards: Anthony Carelli, Aracelis Girmay, Jenny Johnson, Roger Reeves
- PEN Award for Poetry in Translation: to Eliza Griswold, I Am the Beggar of the World: Landays from Contemporary Afghanistan, translated from the Pashto. – Judge: Ana Božičević
- PEN Center USA 2015 Poetry Award: Claudia Rankine, Citizen: An American Lyric
- PEN/Voelcker Award for Poetry: (Judges: )
- Raiziss/de Palchi Translation Award:
- Rhysling Award:
  - F. J. Bergmann, 100 Reasons to Have Sex with an Alien (Long Form)
  - Marge Simon, Shutdown (Short Fom)
- Ruth Lilly Poetry Prize: Alice Notley
- Kingsley Tufts Poetry Award:
- Walt Whitman Prize – - Judge:
- Yale Younger Series:

==== From the Poetry Society of America ====
- Frost Medal:
- Shelley Memorial Award:
- Writer Magazine/Emily Dickinson Award:
- Lyric Poetry Award:
- Alice Fay Di Castagnola Award:
- Louise Louis/Emily F. Bourne Student Poetry Award:
- George Bogin Memorial Award:
- Robert H. Winner Memorial Award: '
- Cecil Hemley Memorial Award:
- Norma Farber First Book Award:
- Lucille Medwick Memorial Award:
- William Carlos Williams Award: (Judge: )
  - Finalists for WCW Award:

== Conferences and workshops by country ==
=== United States ===
- West Chester University Poetry Conference will take place at West Chester University in West Chester, Pennsylvania from June 2 to 6, 2015.

== Deaths ==
=== January – June ===
Birth years link to the corresponding "[year] in poetry" article:

- January 1 – Miller Williams, 84 (born 1930), American poet, maybe best known for reading the inaugural poem at US President Bill Clinton's second inauguration.
- January 4 – Michele Serros, 48 (born 1966), American novelist and poet, who was a staff writer for the George Lopez Show.
- January 27 - Suzette Haden Elgin, 78, (born 1936), American editor, linguist, poet and founder of the Rhysling Award.
- January 29 – Rod McKuen, 81 (born 1933), American poet, singer and songwriter ("Jean", "Seasons in the Sun") who was one of the bestselling poets of the 1960s
- February 4 – Martin Green, 82 (born 1932), English author, poet and publisher
- February 14 – Philip Levine, 87 (born 1928), American Pulitzer Prize-winning poet and a former Poet Laureate of the United States.
- April 15 – Tomas Tranströmer, 83 (born 1931), Swedish poet and translator who gained significant recognition during his lifetime. He was the recipient of numerous awards, including the Neustadt International Prize for Literature (1990), and the Nobel Prize in Literature (2011).
- May 14 – Franz Wright, 62, US poet who received the 2004 Pulitzer Prize for Poetry, an award his father, poet James Wright, also received in 1972.

=== July – December ===
- July 8 – James Tate, 71 (born 1943), American Pulitzer Prize-winning poet (for his Selected Poems published in 1991).
- July 26 – Lee Harwood, 76 (born 1939) British poet associated with the British Poetry Revival.
- July 30 – Kenneth Irby, 78 (born 1936), American poet who received the Shelley Memorial Award, and was sometimes associated with the Black Mountain poets.
- August 22:
  - Stephen Rodefer, 74 (born 1940), American poet and painter whose early publications associated him with the Language poets.
  - Charles Tomlinson, 88 (born 1927), English poet and translator.
- November 8 – Abdul Razzak Abdul Wahid, 85 (born 1930), Iraqi poet.
- November 11 – Madeline DeFrees, 95 (born 1919), Canadian-born American poet who was awarded the 2002 Lenore Marshall Poetry Prize.
- November 23 – Jamiluddin Aali, 90 (born 1925), Pakistani Urdu poet, critic, playwright, essayist, columnist and scholar.
- November 25 – Judith Fitzgerald, 63 (born 1952), Canadian poet and journalist.
- November 29 – Christopher Middleton, 89 (born 1926), British poet and translator.
- December 5 – William McIlvanney, 79 (born 1936), Scottish novelist, short story writer and poet.
- December 24 – Justin Chin, 46, San Francisco-based poet who was born in Malaysia, but had been active in the Bay Area since the early 1990s

== See also ==
- List of years in poetry
- Poetry
- List of poetry awards
