= Tightrope Books =

Canadian independent book publisher

- Status: defunct
- Founded: 2005
- Founder: Halli Villegas
- Successor: Jim Nason
- Country of origin: Canada
- Headquarters location: Toronto
- Publication types: Books

Tightrope Books was a Canadian independent book publisher based in Toronto, Canada. Founded in 2005 by Halli Villegas, it published poetry, fiction, non-fiction and anthologies. The company was purchased by Jim Nason in 2014; it ceased operations in 2019.

== Annual publications ==
Among its publications were the annual anthologies, Best Canadian Poetry in English and Best Canadian Essays. For both series, guest editors chose the best poems and essays by Canadians published in the preceding year.

=== Best Canadian Poetry in English ===
Year	Guest Editor	Series Editor
2008	Stephanie Bolster	Molly Peacock
2009	A. F. Moritz	Molly Peacock
2010	Lorna Crozier	Molly Peacock
2011	Priscila Uppal	Molly Peacock

The Best Canadian Poetry in English 2008

Writers: Maleea Acker, James Arthur, Leanne Averbach, Margaret Avison, Ken Babstock, John Wall Barger, Brian Bartlett, John Barton, Yvonne Blomer, Tim Bowling, Heather Cadsby, Anne Compton, Kevin Connolly, Meira Cook, Dani Couture, Sadiqa de Meijer, Barry Dempster, Jeramy Dodds, Jeffery Donaldson, Susan Elmslie, Jason Guriel, Aurian Haller, Jason Heroux, Iain Higgins, Bill Howell, Helen Humphreys, Amanda Lamarche, Tim Lilburn, Michael Lista, Keith Maillard, Don McKay, A. F. Moritz, Jim Nason, Peter Norman, Alison Pick, E. Alex Pierce, Craig Poile, Matt Rader, Michael Eden Reynolds, Shane Rhodes, Joy Russell, Heather Sellers, David Seymour, J. Mark Smith, Adam Sol, Carmine Starnino, Anna Swanson, Todd Swift, J.R. Toriseva, and Leif E. Vaage.

The Best Canadian Poetry in English 2009

Writers: Margaret Atwood, Margaret Avison, Ken Babstock, Shirley Bear, Tim Bowling, Asa Boxer, Anne Compton, Jan Conn, Lorna Crozier, Barry Dempster, Don Domanski, John Donlan, Tyler Enfield, Jesse Ferguson, Connie Fife, Adam Getty, Steven Heighton, Michael Johnson, Sonnet L'Abbe, Anita Lahey, M. Travis Lane, Evelyn Lau, Richard Lemm, Dave Margoshes, Don McKay, Eric Miller, Shane Neilson, Peter Norman, David O'Meara, P. K. Page, Elise Partridge, Elizabeth Philips, Meredith Quartermain, Matt Rader, John Reibetanz, Robyn Sarah, Peter Dale Scott, Cora Sire, Karen Solie, Carmine Starnino, John Steffler, Ricardo Sternberg, John Terpstra, Sharon Thesen, Matthew Tierney, Patrick Warner, Tom Wayman, Patricia Young, Changming Yuan, and Jan Zwicky.

The Best Canadian Poetry in English 2010

Writers: Ken Babstock, John Barton, Anne Compton, Allan Cooper, Mary Dalton, Barry Dempster, Kildare Dobbs, Don Domanski, Glen Downie, Sue Goyette, Rosemary Griebel, Adrienne Gruber, Jamella Hagen, Steven Heighton, Warren Heiti, M.G.R. Hickman-Barr, Maureen Hynes, Michael Johnson, Jim Johnstone, Sonnet L'Abbé, Fiona Tinwei Lam, Evelyn Lau, Katherine Lawrence, Ross Leckie, Tim Lilburn, Dave Margoshes, Jim Nason, Catherine Owen, P. K. Page, Rebecca Leah Papucaru, Marilyn Gear Pilling, Lenore and Beth Rowntree, Armand Garnet Ruffo, Lori Saint-Martin, Peter Sanger, Robyn Sarah, Eleonore Schönmaier, David Seymour, Melanie Siebert, Sue Sinclair, Karen Solie, Nick Thran, Carey Toane, Anne-Marie Turza, Paul Tyler, Patrick Warner, Zachariah Wells, Patricia Young, David Zieroth, and Jan Zwicky.

=== Best Canadian Essays ===
Year	Guest Editor	Series Editor
2009	Carmine Starnino	Alex Boyd
2010	Kamal Al-Solaylee	Alex Boyd
2011	Ibi Kaslik	Christopher Doda
2012	Ray Robertson	Christopher Doda

The Best Canadian Essays 2009 Writers: Kamal Al-Solaylee, Katherine Ashenburg, Kris Demeanor, Jessa Gamble, Nicholas Hune-Brown, Chris Koentges, Anita Lahey, Alison Lee, Nick Mount, Denis Seguin, Chris Turner, Lori Theresa Waller, Nathan Whitlock, and Chris Wood.

The Best Canadian Essays 2010 Writers: Katherine Ashenburg, Ira Basen, Will Braun, Tyee Bridge, Abou Farman, Paul Gallant, Lisa Gregoire, Danielle Groen, Elizabeth Hay, Jason McBride, Carolyn Morris, Katharine Sandiford, Andrew Steinmetz, Timothy Taylor, Chris Turner, and Nora Underwood.

The Best Canadian Essays 2011 Writers: Caroline Adderson, Daniel Baird, Kerry Clare, Nicholas Hune-Brown, Mark Kingwell, Mark Mann, Sean Michaels, Kelly Pullen

The Best Canadian Essays 2012 Writers: Ryan Bigge, George Fetherling, Stephen Henighan

== Other titles ==
- Fortune Cookie by Heather J. Wood
- In the Dark Stories From The Supernatural edited by Myna Wallin and Halli Villegas
- The Stone Skippers by Ian Burgham
- She's Shameless edited by Stacey May Fowles and Megan Griffith-Greene
- GULCH edited by Sarah Beaudin, Karen Correia Da Silva, and Curran Folkers
- The Girl on the Escalator by Jim Nason
- Confessions of a Reluctant Cougar by Myna Wallin
- A Thousand Profane Pieces by Myna Wallin
- Onion Man by Kathryn Mockler

== Recognition ==
The Nights Also (2010) by Anna Swanson won the award for Best Lesbian Poetry at the 23rd Lambda Literary Awards. It also made the 2011 Gerald Lampert Memorial Award shortlist.

Wrong Bar (2009) by Nathaniel G. Moore made the 2010 ReLit Award novel shortlist.
