= Viktor Mitic =

Canadian painter and sculptor

- Occupations: Artist, sculptor
- Notable work: Screw Harper, Hole Jesus, Blasted Beaverbrook, Incident

Viktor Mitic is a Serbian-born Canadian painter and sculptor living in Toronto, Ontario. He is best known for incorporating firearms in his art, a skill he acquired during national service in his native Yugoslavia. Because art and violence coexist in an inexplicable way, Mitic says his art highlights the absurdity and senselessness of gun violence, but at the same time he transforms these acts into art. One of his most notable works, the Blasted Beaverbrook, was commissioned for exhibition in 2009 by New Brunswick's provincial gallery, the Beaverbrook Art Gallery.

Mitic incorporates guns into his art with the intention of provoking conversation about the gun violence that permeates our culture: "I don't think guns should exist...[they're] made to kill and to destroy." But now, rather than guns eradicating, Mitic repurposes them to create art. And although Mitic does not consider himself an anti-gun activist, he lets the viewers figure out what to do about guns.

Some of Mitic's more controversial works includes famous celebrities whose lives were cut short due to gun violence. These include Mahatma Gandhi and John F. Kennedy. The artist has also rendered portraits of Jesus Christ, Marilyn Monroe, John Wayne and Chairman Mao, all of which are riddled with bullet holes. Mitic's portrait of John Lennon, in fact, was created using the same model of gun Lennon was killed with.

Mitic's "gun-art" has generated both interest and outrage amongst audiences and galleries.

== Early life and education ==
Mitic was born and grew up in former Yugoslavia before moving to Canada. He graduated with a BFA from the University of Toronto, Canada, and got his Fine Arts Diploma from Sheridan College in Oakville, Ontario, Canada.

== Career ==
In 1995 Mitic completed a portrait of Hon. Jean Chrétien. The two met later that year at a formal unveiling of the portrait at the prime minister's office in Ottawa. The presentation was supported by Hon. Jean Augustine, an MP from Etobicoke-Lakeshore.

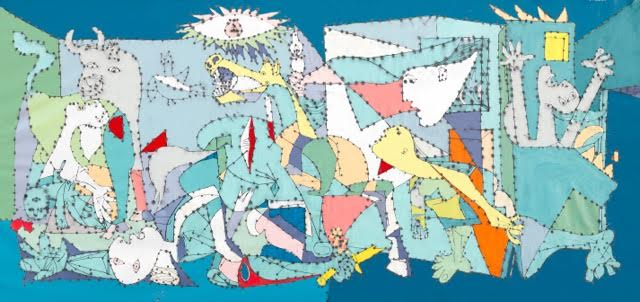
Blasted Guernica

Mitic's 2008 piece Hole Jesus, a portrait of Jesus created by firing 22-calibre bullets at a canvas, was displayed at Toronto's Trias Gallery and attracted media coverage. Mitic told the Biggs Museum of American Art that he was inspired to create the work after an art dealer told him his work ought to be more "penetrating". Screw Harper, a portrait made of screws of Canadian Prime Minister Stephen Harper, was featured at an exhibition titled "Art or Deconstruction" at Pages Bookstore in Toronto. Mitic's first show in Japan, at the Muramatsu Gallery in Tokyo, was supported by the Canadian and Serbian Embassies. Mitic also exhibited alongside his son, Ansel Yamamoto Mitic, in a show titled Duet at Toronto's IndexG gallery.

Also in 2008, Mitic displayed another piece at the Muramatsu Gallery titled Galaxy. Galaxy was created using an accidentally-discovered technique he refers to as acid rain painting. The piece was sold at a charity auction in Toronto to a private collector and is also featured on the front cover of Rain Dance, a book of reproductions which covers Mitic's series of rain-inspired paintings. When asked in an interview about his "acid-rain" pieces, Mitic describes them as environment-influenced, non-representational, two-dimensional paintings on canvas. He says he enjoys rebuilding structures that have been erased by nature.

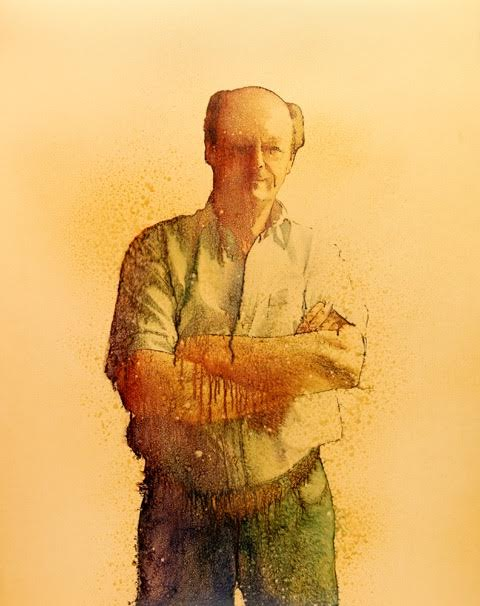
Odon Wagner

In 2009 Viktor Mitic partnered with the Odon Wagner Gallery & Contemporary. The Wagner Gallery had exhibited his famed "Blasted Guernica" at the international exhibition Art Toronto (formerly the TIAF) the previous October.Viktor Mitic's first solo show at Odon Wagner Contemporary opened to the public on December 11, 2009. The exhibition titled "DEALERS: 36 portraits of Toronto's Art Dealers" launched in conjunction with a book of the same title at Odon Wagner Contemporary. This series intended to reverse the relationship between dealer and artist: rather than the dealer promoting the artist, now the artist was promoting the dealer.

In 2010 Mitic exhibited his controversial bullet hole paintings at a show titled "Art or War", at Moos Gallery in Toronto. That same year, a book and DVD under the same title was published in Toronto, which included some of Mitic's art. Also that year, he was globally featured in various television programs and newspapers.

In 2013 a large sculpture of Mitic's was installed in Washington, D.C. This piece, titled Incident, was featured on the front page of a major Canadian newspaper and by various Canadian and US television, paper, and online news media.

In 2014 a documentary titled Gun Porn by Brahm Rosensweig, which described the unusual process of creating Mitic's "unique and violent work of art", was featured at the Hot Docs Canadian International Documentary Festival.

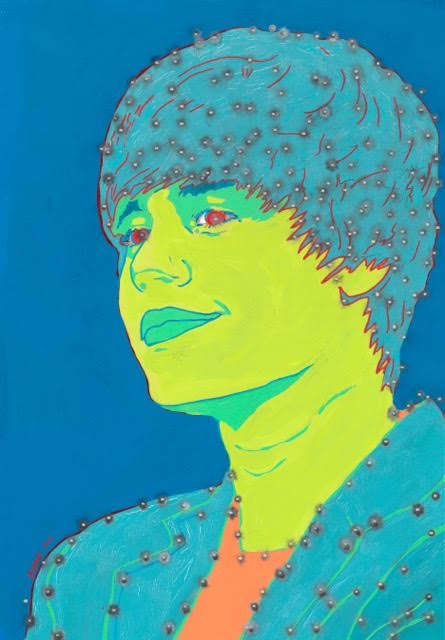
Green, Shot-up Portrait of Justin Bieber

In 2015 Mitic exhibited a collection of 58 pieces acquired by Artisan Works in Rochester, New York. He also appeared in an MTV comedy show shortly after. The show was featured in various publications, both in the US and Canada. Another piece released in 2015—titled Spectral Confederation—"advocates change and serves as a commentary to the underlining issues around gun control, homophobia, racism and the many historical prejudices that plague society today," said publicist Andrew Anderson.

In 2016 Remington Contemporary Art Gallery showcased “Blasted Guernica”, a shot-up version of Picasso’s Guernica, in their permanent art collection in Markham, Ontario.

In 2017 a large-scale aluminum and steel sculpture titled "Hypervelocity Asteroid" (22'×3'×10', painted aluminum and steel 2016) was acquired by Elizabeth Collection in Rochester, New York.

== Filmography ==
- "Art or War", by Laurie Kwasnik, 12 minutes, 2010.
- "Rain Dance", by Brahm Rosensweig, 14 min. 2011, Fourfront Editions.
- "Gun Porn", by Brahm Rosensweig, 11 min, Hot Docs, Hulu 2014
- "POINT BLANK: ART OR WAR", by Nora Stankovic, 6 min, Cannes 2016

== Publications ==
- "Dealers", 2009, by Viktor Mitic (introduction by Gary Michael Dault) Tightrope Books
- "Art or War", 2010, Bullet hole paintings by Viktor Mitic (introduction by Jim Nason), Tightrope Books
- "Rain Dance", 2011, Fourfront Editions

== Notable works ==
- Screw Harper, 2008, Bravo TV. Private collection
- Hole Jesus, 2008, Published by Tightrope Books, Art or War, 2010. Private Collection
- Blasted Beaverbrook, 2009, Published by Tightrope Books, Art or War, 2010. Permanent Collection / Beaverbrook Art Gallery in New Brunswick.
- "Incident" 2013, Toronto, Washington DC. Permanent Collection/ Artisan Works, Rochester, NY.
- Black and white together, forever. Deluca gallery, Toronto 2014. Private Collection
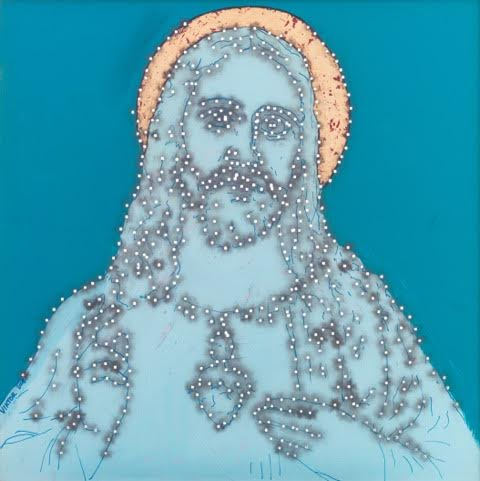
Hole Jesus

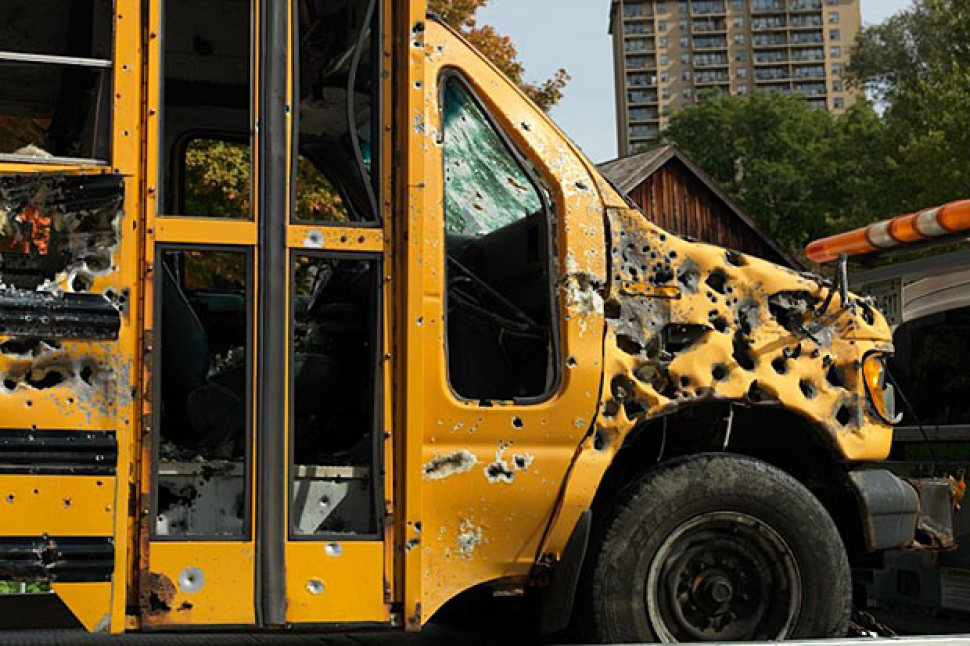
Incident
