= Daniel Scott Tysdal =

Canadian poet and film director (born 1978)

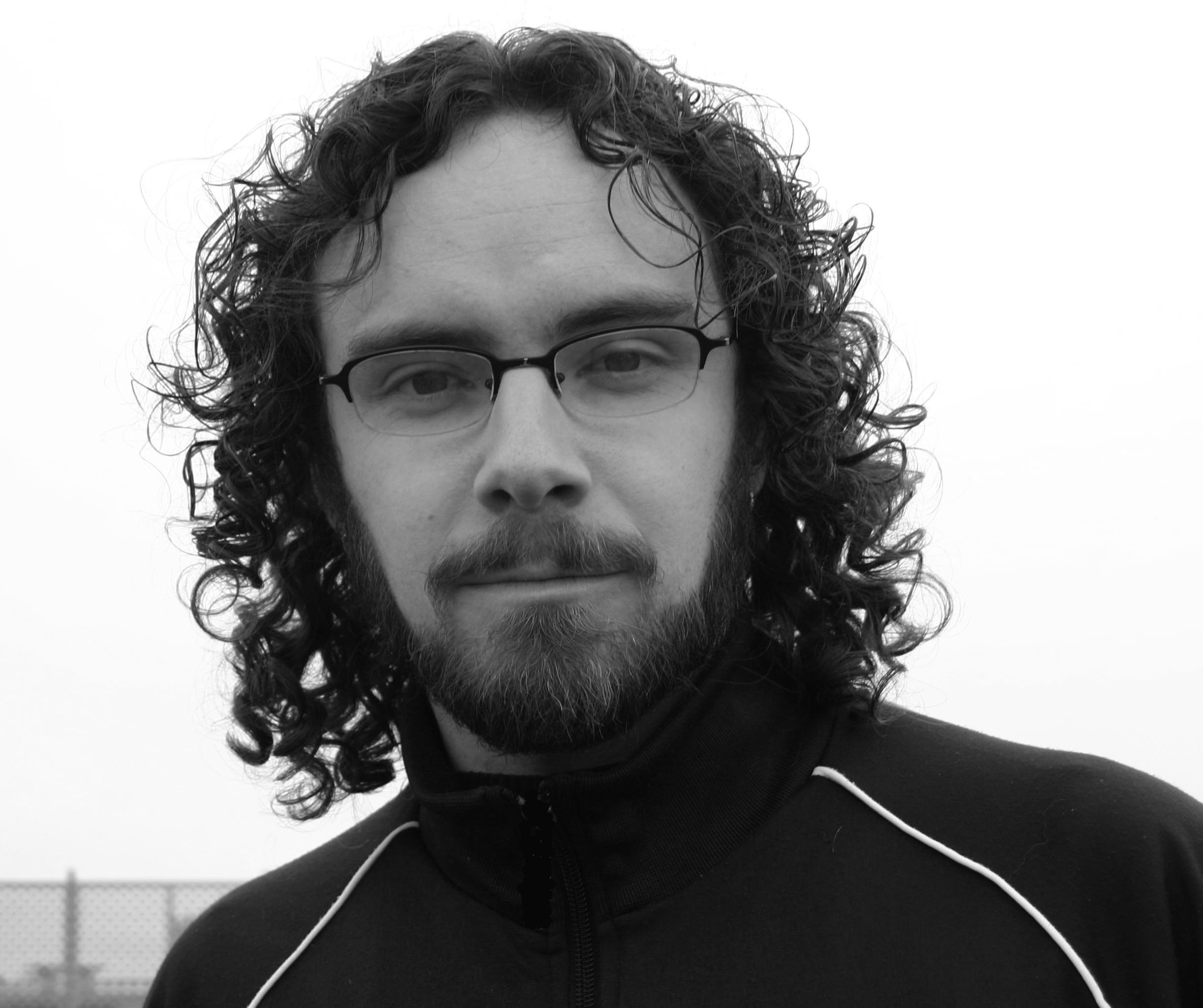
- Born: May 26, 1978 (age 48); Moose Jaw, Saskatchewan, Canada
- Education: University of Regina (BA); Acadia University (MA); University of Toronto (MA)
- Occupations: Poet, filmmaker
- Writing career
- Period: 2006 - present
- Genres: Poetry, fiction, film
- Movements: Postmodern literature, elegiac tradition

Daniel Scott Tysdal (born May 26, 1978) is a Canadian poet and film director whose work approaches the lyric mode with an experimental spirit. In June 2007, Tysdal received the ReLit Award for Poetry.

Tysdal was born in Moose Jaw, Saskatchewan, and was raised on a farm. He received a Bachelor of Arts Honor from the University of Regina in 2003, a Master of Arts in English from Acadia University in 2006, and a Master of Arts in Creative Writing from The University of Toronto in 2008. He currently lives in Toronto and is a lecturer in creative writing at The University of Toronto Scarborough.

== Career and awards ==
=== Poetry ===
His first collection of poetry, Predicting the Next Big Advertising Breakthrough Using a Potentially Dangerous Method (2006), received the 2004 John V. Hicks Manuscript Award and the 2006 Anne Szumigalski Award (Saskatchewan Book Award for Best Book of Poetry). Predicting the Next Big Advertising Breakthrough was also shortlisted for the 2006 Brenda MacDonald Riches Award (Saskatchewan Book Award for Best First Book), and won the 2007 ReLit Award. Tysdal's poem, "An Experiment in Form," received honourable mention in the 2003 National Magazine Awards. His poem "T-Shirts or Toys: Crib Notes for a One-Year-Old Nephew" was a national finalist in the CBC's (Canadian Broadcasting Company) 2005 National Poetry Face-Off.

Tysdal's poetry, Canadian writer Jon Paul Fiorentino writes, "is an exhilarating mix of pop culture, philosophy, mythology, and visual art." His work investigates traditional poetic themes -loss and redemption, selfhood and community— through a diverse range of contemporary experiences, mediums and artefacts. Predicting the Next Big Advertising Breakthrough begins with "Zombies: A Catalogue of Their Return," a modestly illustrated description of a zombie invasion, and ends with, "A><B," a poem that works like one of Al Jaffee’s MAD Magazine "fold-ins"; to read the final line of the poem, readers must physically fold the page in thirds to discover it. Thus, whether writing a traditional lyric or elegy, or dealing with subjects as diverse as bukkake and Walter Benjamin, Tysdal "gets us to rethink what constitutes a poetic text." George Elliot Clarke observes, "for all their high-minded, critical jouissance, the lyrics are lively with accessible puns, jokes, games, and satire."

In the book, Tysdal's work is also characterized by elements of concrete poetry and visual art. "One Way of Shuffling Is Ten Hours into Back-to-Back Sessions Going on Tilt," a meditation on ideas of order and origin through a hand of Texas Hold 'Em, takes the visual form of a deck of cards. "How We Know We Are Being Addressed by the Man Who Shot Himself Online" works with the images taken from the digital footage of a suicide posted on the World Wide Web, an innovative poetic strategy praised by one reviewer as the book's "most horrifying intermingling of text with visuals." But reviewer Tim Conley demurred, writing that the book, "has the pleasing shape of a catalogue but structurally smacks of one of those dead-end marketplace "squatter" sites encountered at a wrong turn on the web, offering catch-all links in categories (games, dating, cell phones, horoscopes, real estate, movies) ..."

Tysdal's second book of poetry,The Mourner's Book of Albums, was published by Tightrope Books in October 2010. A poem from that collection, "The Big List," was chosen as one of the fifty best Canadian poems published in Canadian literary journals in 2010 and appears in the anthology The Best Canadian Poetry in English 2011 edited by Priscila Uppal and Molly Peacock.

=== Fiction ===
Tysdal has also received recognition for his work in short fiction. In 2008, Tysdal's short story "What is Missing" received first place in the Eye Weekly Short Story Contest. His fiction has also appeared in online literary magazines including Joyland: A hub for short fiction (2012) and The Puritan (2011).

His first full-length short story collection, Waveforms and Doom Scrolls, was published in 2021. The book was shortlisted for the ReLit Award for short fiction in 2022.

== Bibliography ==
=== Poetry ===
- Predicting the Next Big Advertising Breakthrough Using a Potentially Dangerous Method (2006); Coteau Books
- The Mourner's Book of Albums (2010); Tightrope Books
- Fauxccasional Poems (2015); icehouse poetry

=== Fiction and photography ===
- Dear Adolf (2012); Steel Bananas

=== Textbooks ===
- The Writing Moment: A Practical Guide to Creating Poems (2013); Oxford University Press Canada

=== Anthologies ===
- "The Best Canadian Poetry in English 2011", eds. Priscila Uppal and Molly Peacock (2011); Tightrope Books
- Gulch: An Assemblage of Poetry and Prose eds. Karen Correia Da Silva, Sarah Beaudin, and Curran Folkers (2009); Tightrope Books
- Boredom Fighters: A Collection of Graphic Poems eds. Jake Kennedy and Paola Paoletto (2008); Tightrope Books
- Fast Forward: New Saskatchewan Poets eds. Barbara Klar and Paul Wilson (2007); Hagios Press

=== Criticism ===
- Tysdal, Dan. "Inarticulation and the Figure of Enjoyment: Raymond Carver's Minimalism Meets David Foster Wallace's 'A Radically Condensed History of Postindustrial Life.'" Wascana Review of Contemporary Poetry and Short Fiction 38.1 (2003), 66-83.
