= Roxanna Bennett =

Canadian poet

Roxanna Bennett is a Canadian poet, whose 2019 collection Unmeaningable won the Raymond Souster Award and the Trillium Book Award for English Poetry in 2020.

Unmeaningable was also shortlisted for the Pat Lowther Award, and their 2021 collection The Untranslatable I was shortlisted for the Governor General's Award for English-language poetry at the 2021 Governor General's Awards. The Untranslatable I was a finalist for the 2022 Trillium Book Award for Poetry and won the League of Canadian Poets' Raymond Souster Award.

Based in Whitby, Ontario, Bennett's poetry centres on disability.

== Works ==
- The Uncertainty Principle (2014)
- the unseen garden (2018)
- Unmeaningable (2019)
- The Untranslatable I (2021)
