= Kim Trainor =

Canadian poet

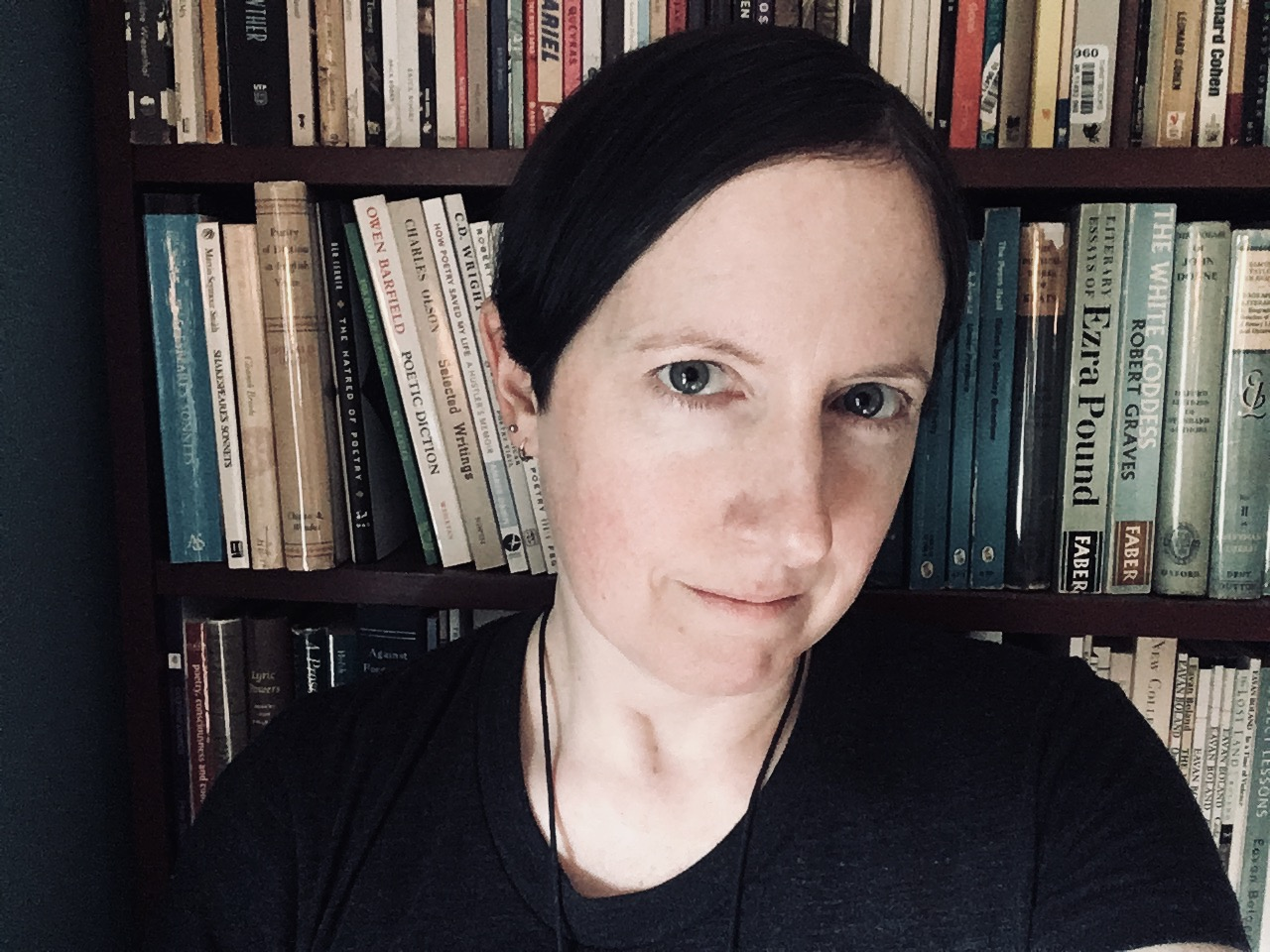
Kim Trainor

Kim Trainor is a Canadian poet. Trainor was the recipient of the Fiddlehead's 2019 Ralph Gustafson Prize and the Malahat Review's 2013 Long Poem Prize.

Trainor's work is particularly concerned with ecology, grief, and memory. Her first book Karyotype was published by Brick Books in 2015. George Elliot Clarke described the book as a "recollection of the organized violence that is war and/or tyranny." Trainor's second book Ledi was published by Book*hug. Focusing on the controversial excavation of the Siberian Ice Maiden, the book continues the poet's elegiac themes, with a focus on the Iron Age horsewoman's role in society. The book was a finalist for the 2019 Raymond Souster Award presented by the League of Canadian Poets.

Her most recent work has focused on ecological grief and resilience. A thin fire runs through me appeared with icehouse poetry (Gooselane Editions) in 2023. A blueprint for survival appeared with Guernica Editions in spring 2024. Wanda Praamsma has described this book as "one we should all attempt to absorb." Rob McLennan observes "There is a thickness to her lyric, writing undergrowth and foliage, of trees and scientific names....There is something of the long poem combined with both the poetic diary and book-length essay that Trainor offers in this collection, articulating crisis and climate but expanding into an agency of archival research and illustrations; she writes asides and footnotes and prose stretches through a lyric framework in an impressive book-length package. This is a highly ambitious and heartfelt collection, one that even provides echoes of the detailed lyric researches of one such as Saskatchewan poet Sylvia Legris, attending to the big idea through an accumulation of minute details. The scale of this volume is incredible. I don’t know how to begin."

== Bibliography ==
- Trainor, Kim. Blue thinks itself within me: Lyric poetry, ecology, and lichenous form (2026) Oskana Poetry & Poetics / University of Regina Press
- Trainor, Kim. A blueprint for survival (2024) Guernica Editions 2024
- Trainor, Kim. A thin fire runs through me (2023) icehouse poetry / Goose Lane Editions 2023
- Trainor, Kim. Ledi (2018) Book*hug
- Trainor, Kim. Karyotype (2015) Brick Books
- Trainor, Kim. “Seed 1: Shelter,” “Paper Birch,” and “North Road.” Anthologized in Fire Season II, Fall 2022
- Trainor, Kim. “Seed 11: Pacific Salmon (Oncorhynchus).” Dark Mountain, Issue 21, Spring 2022.
- Trainor, Kim. “Trickster, Scavenger, Discoverer of Light: Seed 12, Common Raven; Seed 13, Silene Steonphylla, Svalbard Seedvault; Seed 14: XR/Getting Deeper.” The Journal of Wild Culture. Spring 2022.
- Trainor, Kim. “An Excerpt from “Seeds”: “Seed 8, Elysia chlorotica” and “Seed 19, Gaia”. Ecozon@. Vol. 12, No.2. Eco-Georgic: From Antiquity to Anthropocene. 28 October 2021.
- Trainor, Kim. “Desolation.” Deep Wild Journal: Writing From the Backcountry. (US). Issue 3. June 2021.
- Trainor, Kim. Excerpt from “Seeds:” “Seed 5. Tiny house, caracol, snail + Seed 19. SARS-CoV-2.” Ecocene: Cappadocia Journal of Environmental Humanities. (Turkey). Volume 1, Issue 2. Winter 2020.
- Trainor, Kim. “Pacific Tree Frog” and “Tonquin.”Fall/Winter 2020. The Cold Mountain Review. (US). Special Issue on the Undiscovered.
- Trainor, Kim. “Snowdrop (Galanthus nivalis).” ISLE: Interdisciplinary Studies in Literature and Environment. (US). 24 November 2020. https://doi.org/10.1093/isle/isaa135
- Trainor, Kim. “Say Nuth Khaw Yum.” Ecological Citizen. October 2020. Vol.4, No.1, 2020.
- Trainor, Kim. “Pacific Tree Frog” and “Tonquin.”Fall/Winter 2020. The Cold Mountain Review. (US). Special Issue on the Undiscovered.
