= Nathanael Jones (Canadian writer) =

Canadian poet

Nathanael Jones is a Canadian poet from Montreal, Quebec. His debut poetry collection, Aqueous, was a shortlisted finalist for the Gerald Lampert Award in 2025.

An alumnus of NSCAD University and the School of the Art Institute of Chicago, he previously published the chapbooks ATG (2016) and La Poésie Caraïbe (2018).

Aqueous was also longlisted for the Raymond Souster Award.
