= Marc Perez =

Canadian poet

Marc Perez is a Canadian poet based in Vancouver, British Columbia. His debut poetry collection, Dayo, was published in 2024, and was the winner of the Gerald Lampert Award from the League of Canadian Poets in 2025.

A graduate of the creative writing program at the University of British Columbia, he previously published the chapbook Borderlands in 2020.
