= Michael Lista =

Canadian poet (born 1983)

- Born: September 1, 1983 (age 43); Toronto, Ontario, Canada
- Occupations: Poet, essayist
- Writing career
- Period: 2006–present
- Genre: Poetry

Michael Lista (born September 1, 1983) is a Canadian poet. He is the author of Bloom, a book of poems about Canadian Manhattan Project physicist Louis Slotin. He writes a monthly column on poetry for The National Post and lives in Toronto, Ontario.

== Career ==
Poems from Lista's debut, Bloom, first began appearing in 2007, when the art magazine Border Crossings published "Fourteen Poems from Bloom" prefaced by a lengthy editorial introduction in its November 2007 issue. Selections from Bloom then appeared in many of Canada's literary journals and magazines, including ARC Magazine, Descant, Event, Maisonneuve, The Malahat Review, Rhythm, and The Walrus.

In the summer of 2008 Canadian poet Ken Babstock selected and read some of Lista's Bloom poems as part of the Scream Literary Festival's Alumni Night. Excerpts were published in the chapbook Best Practices. Later that summer, while in Los Alamos, New Mexico, Lista received and accepted an offer to publish Bloom with House of Anansi Press.

In the months leading up to its publication in April 2010, Bloom was named one of the most anticipated books of the year by Quill and Quire, Maisonneuve, and by Carmine Starnino on the Véhicule Press Blog. Quill and Quire named it one of its ten best books of 2010, the first time a book of poems has been so acknowledged since 2006's Airstream Land Yacht by Ken Babstock.

November 2010 saw the inauguration of Lista's monthly column On Poetry in The National Post.
