= Alison Pick =

Canadian writer (born 1975)

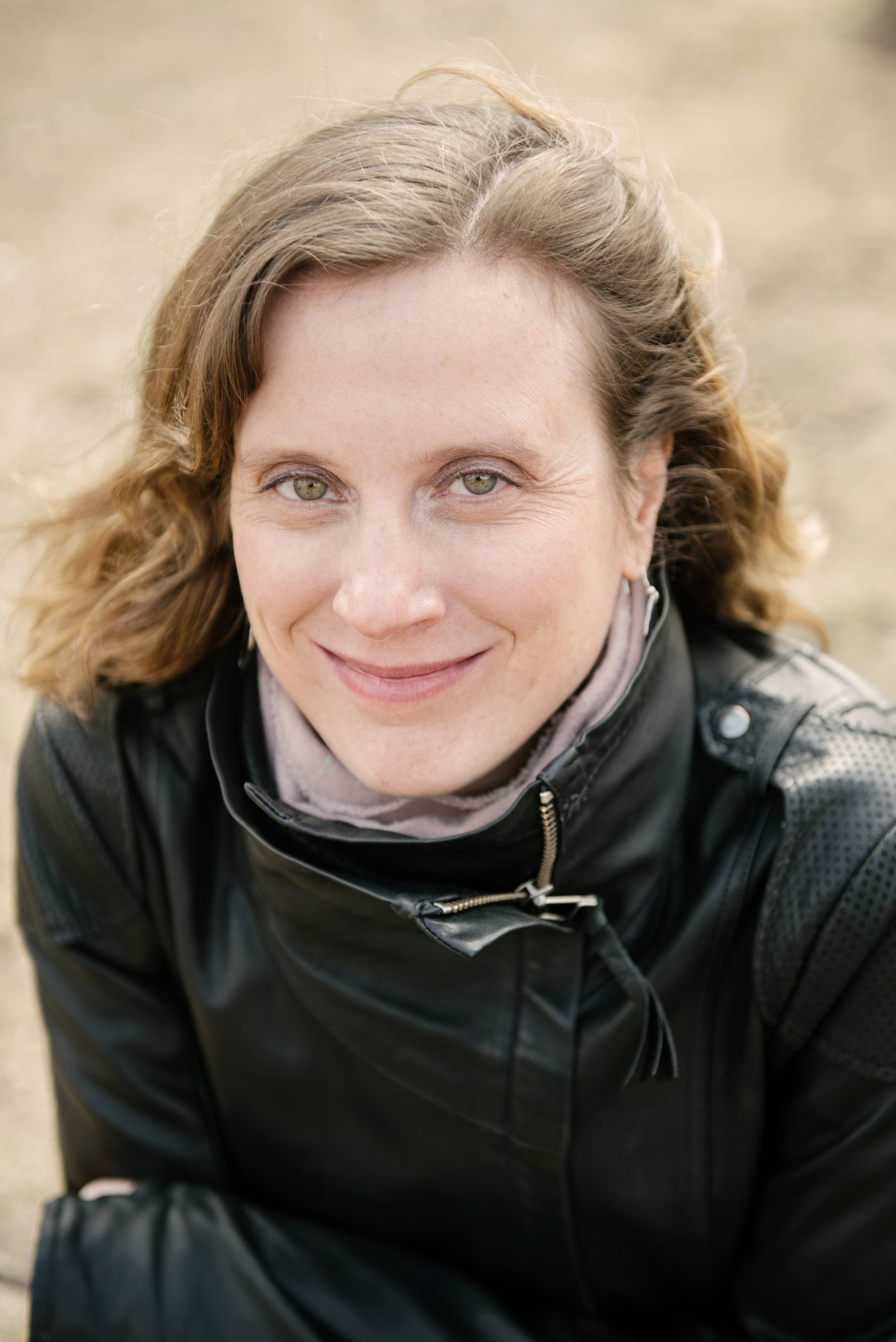
- Alison Pick, 2015
- Born: 1975 (age 50–51); Toronto, Ontario, Canada
- Occupations: novelist, poet
- Spouse: Eric O'Brien
- Children: Ayla (b.2009)
- Relatives: Thomas Pick (father); Emily (sister)

Alison Pick (born 1975) is a Canadian writer. She is most noted for her Booker Prize-nominated novel Far to Go, and was a winner of the Bronwen Wallace Memorial Award for most promising writer in Canada under 35.

== Life and career ==
Alison Pick is the author of three novels (The Sweet Edge, Far to Go, and Strangers With the Same Dream), two poetry collections and one memoir (Between Gods). She was born in Toronto, Ontario and grew up in Kitchener. In 1999, she graduated from the University of Guelph with a B.A. in psychology. Pick received her MA in philosophy from Memorial University in Newfoundland. During her teenage years, Pick discovered that her father's Czech family was originally Jewish although he had been raised a Christian. Pick herself later converted to Judaism.

Pick's novel Far to Go won the Canadian Jewish Book Award and was nominated for the 2011 Man Booker Prize. The novel has been optioned for film by House of Films, with a screenplay written by Hannah Moscovitch and Rosa Laborde.

Pick is the author of Between Gods, a memoir about depression, family secrets, and forging a new identity from the ashes of the past. It won the Canadian Jewish Book Award for Memoir, and was shortlisted for the BC National Award for Canadian Non-Fiction and for the Wingate Prize in the UK. Between Gods was also a Top Book of 2014 at the CBC and The Globe and Mail.

The title section of Pick's poetry collection Question & Answer won the 2002 Bronwen Wallace Memorial Award for Poetry and the 2003 National Magazine Award for Poetry. The book itself was short-listed for the League of Canadian Poets Gerald Lampert Award for best first book of poetry, and for a Newfoundland and Labrador Book Award. Pick also won the 2005 CBC Literary Award for Poetry. Her writing has appeared widely in publications including The Globe and Mail,The Walrus, and enRoute Magazine.

Pick served on the jury for the 2015 Scotiabank Giller Prize. Pick taught at the Iceland Writers Retreat in Reykjavík, Iceland in the spring of 2015. She is currently a member of the faculty at the Humber School for Writers and the Sage Hill Writing Experience. She lives and writes in Toronto.

== Awards ==
- 2001 – Shortlist: CBC Literary Awards (Fiction)
- 2002 – Bronwen Wallace Memorial Award for Poetry (for the title section of Question & Answer)
- 2002 – Shortlist: League of Canadian Poets Gerald Lampert Award (for Question & Answer)
- 2002 – Shortlist: Newfoundland and Labrador Book Award (for Question & Answer)
- 2002 – Winner: Writer's Federation of New Brunswick's Alfred G. Bailey Manuscript Prize
- 2003 – National Magazine (Gold) Award for Poetry
- 2003 – Shortlist: CBC Literary Awards (Fiction)
- 2005 – CBC Literary Award for Poetry (for "The Mind's Eye")
- 2006 – Editor's Choice': Arc Poem of the Year Contest
- 2007 – Finalist: National Magazine Award for Poetry
- 2008 – The Globe and Mail Top 100 Book (for The Sweet Edge)
- 2010 – Winner: Words Worthy Award for Best Novel
- 2011 – Helen and Stan Vine Canadian Jewish Book Award, fiction category (for Far to Go)
- 2011 – Longlist: The Man Booker Prize for Fiction (for Far to Go)
- 2013 – Winner: Governor General's Award for Translation (Quebec edition)
- 2014 – Shortlist: Ontario Arts Council KM Hunter Award for Mid-Career Artist
- 2015 – Winner: Canadian Jewish Book Award for Non-Fiction and Memoir
- 2015 – Shortlisted: BC Award for Canadian Non-Fiction
- 2016 – Longlisted: JQ Wingate Prize
- 2016 – Shortlisted: JQ Wingate Prize

== Festivals ==
- Sunshine Coast Festival of the Written Arts – 2015
- IFOA (Toronto) – 2014, 2011, 2010, 2005
- Wordfest: Calgary and Banff – 2014, 2010, 2003
- Vancouver International Writers Festival – 2014, 2003
- Ottawa International Writers Festival – 2014, 2010, 2008, 2005
- Thin Air: Winnipeg International Writers Festival – 2014, 2003
- The Bookworm International Literary Festival (Beijing, China) – 2012
- Jewish Book Week (London, England) – 2012
- BookFest Windsor – 2012
- Festival of Words (Moose Jaw) – 2012
- Prince Edward County Authors Festival – 2012
- Talking Fresh (Regina) – 2012
- Vancouver Jewish Book Festival – 2011
- San Diego Jewish Book Fair – 2011
- Tarbut: Festival of Jewish Culture (Winnipeg) – 2011
- Eden Mills Writers Festival – 2015, 2011, 2003
- Joe Burke Wolfe Island Literary Festival – 2011
- Elora Writers Festival – 2011
- GritLit (Hamilton) – 2011
- Ontario Writers Conference – 2011
- Kingston WritersFest – 2010
- Měsíc autorského čtení" (The Month Of Authors' Readings) (Brno, Czech Republic) – 2008

== Juries ==
- The Giller Prize – 2015
- The Rogers Writers Trust Fiction Prize – 2013
- CBC Literary Awards – 2011
- The Journey Prize – 2011
- Lampman-Scott Award (Best Book by an Ottawa Poet) – 2008
- Malahat Review Novella Contest – 2008
- Gerald Lampert Award for Best First Book of Poetry – 2007
- Newfoundland Book Awards, Poetry Category – 2007
- Bronwen Wallace Memorial Award for Poetry – 2006
- Gregory Power Awards for Poetry, Memorial University – 2006
- Arts and Letters Awards, Newfoundland Arts Council, Poetry – 2005
- Canada Council for the Arts, Poetry, Mid-Career and Established – 2004

== Anthologies ==
- The M Word: Conversations about Motherhood (Kerry Clare, ed) – Goose Lane, 2014
- Best Canadian Poetry in English 2008 – Tightrope Books, 2008
- The Mind's Eye: CBC Literary Award Winners 2001–2006 – ECW, 2008
- The Echoing Years: An Anthology of Poetry from Canada & Ireland – WIT/SCOP, 2007
- Outside of Ordinary: Women's Travel Stories – Second Story Press, 2005
- Breathing Fire 2: Canada's New Poets – Nightwood Editions, 2004
- Vintage 2000: The League of Canadian Poets – Quarry Press, 2000

== Radio appearances ==
- CBC Radio 'Tapestry,' host Mary Hynes – 2014
- CBC Radio 'The Next Chapter,' host Shelagh Rogers – 2010
- CBC Radio 'Weekend Arts Magazine,' host Angela Antle – 2010
- CBC Radio 'Sounds Like Canada,' host Shelagh Rogers – 2006, 2003
- CBC Radio 'Talking Books,' host Ian Brown – 2006
- CBC Radio 'Between the Covers,' host Eleanor Wachtel – 2006
- CBC Radio 'The Arts Tonight,' host Nora Young – 2006

== Bibliography ==
=== Novels ===
- The Sweet Edge – 2005
- Far to Go – 2010
- Strangers with the Same Dream - 2017

=== Poetry ===
- Question & Answer – 2003
- The Dream World – 2008

=== Non-fiction memoir ===
- Between Gods: A Memoir – 2014
