= Bradley Peters =

Bradley Peters may refer to:

- Brad Peters, Canadian gymnast
- Bradley Peters (poet), Canadian poet
