= Matthew James Weigel =

Canadian writer and artist

Matthew James Weigel is a writer and artist from Canada, whose debut poetry collection Whitemud Walking was a finalist for the 2022 Dayne Ogilvie Prize for first works by LGBTQ Canadian writers.

He was born and raised in Edmonton, Alberta, where he is a graduate student in English and film studies at the University of Alberta. Weigel self-identifies as a Denesuline and Métis.

Whitemud Walking is a collection of poetry about Indigenous peoples' relationship with treaties and archival records in Canada, based around the historical and geographic significance of Edmonton's Whitemud Creek.

He previously won the Vallum Chapbook Award in 2020 for his chapbook It Was Treaty / It Was Me. In 2023, Whitemud Walking won the Gerald Lampert Award, and was shortlisted for the Raymond Souster Award, from the League of Canadian Poets.

In addition to his poetry, Weigel is a designer for the poetry publisher Moon Jelly House, and has created commissioned public artworks including Spirit of Treaty at the entrance to Edmonton's Spirit of Hope United Church, and The Magpie and the Buffalo Treaty in the city's Gold Bar Park.
