= Steve McOrmond =

Canadian poet

Steve McOrmond is a Canadian poet. He was born in Nova Scotia and grew up on Prince Edward Island.

His work has appeared in literary magazines in Canada, Australia and the UK, and has been anthologized in Breathing Fire 2: Canada's New Poets (Nightwood 2004) and Landmarks: An Anthology of New Atlantic Canadian Poetry of the Land (Acorn Press 2001). He has received several awards for his poetry including a 'Highly Commended' award in the 2005 Petra Kenney International Poetry Competition, 2nd prize in This Magazine's Great Canadian Literary Hunt (2001), the Alfred G. Bailey Prize (Writers' Federation of New Brunswick, 1996) and the Milton Acorn Poetry Award (PEI Council of the Arts, 1995). His first book of poetry Lean Days was shortlisted for the Gerald Lampert Award. His second collection of poems is Primer on the Hereafter (Wolsak and Wynn 2006). He lives in Toronto with his wife Janet McOrmond.

== Works ==
- Lean Days (Wolsak and Wynn 2004)
- Primer on the Hereafter (Wolsak and Wynn 2006)
- The Good News about Armageddon (Brick Books 2010)
