= Bradley Peters (poet) =

Canadian poet

- Education: University of the Fraser Valley
- Occupation: Poet
- Writing career
- Notable awards: Raymond Souster Award (2024)

Bradley Peters is a Canadian poet from British Columbia whose debut poetry collection Sonnets from a Cell was published in 2023.

== Early life and education ==
Peters grew up in a Mennonite family in Abbotsford, British Columbia. He studied creative writing at the University of the Fraser Valley.

== Awards ==
Sonnets from a Cell won the 2024 Raymond Souster Award from the League of Canadian Poets, and was a Governor General's Award nominee for English-language poetry at the 2024 Governor General's Awards.

== See also ==
- List of Canadian poets
- List of people from British Columbia
