= Adebe DeRango-Adem =

Canadian poet

Adebe DeRango-Adem is a Canadian poet. She won the 2023 Raymond Souster Award for her poetry collection Vox Humana.

She was previously shortlisted for the Pat Lowther Award in 2016 for Terra Incognita.
