= Alex Boyd (author) =

Canadian poet, essayist, editor, and critic

- Born: Toronto, Canada
- Occupations: Writer, Author, Poet
- Website: https://boydwords.wordpress.com/about-2/

Alex Boyd (born 1969) is a Canadian poet, essayist, editor, and critic.

His essays and articles have appeared in the Globe and Mail, and elsewhere. His first book of poems, Making Bones Walk, was published in 2007.

From 2003 to 2008, he hosted the IV Lounge Reading Series in Toronto, presenting fiction readers alongside poets, and eventually co-editing IV Lounge Nights, an anthology to celebrate the tenth anniversary of the series.

He established Northern Poetry Review, a site for poetry articles and reviews, in April 2006. In 2008, he established Digital Popcorn, a site for personal film reviews, and has helped launch the Best Canadian Essays series with Tightrope Books, co-editing the first two collections.

His second book of poems The Least Important Man was published by Biblioasis in 2012, and his first novel Army of the Brave and Accidental, a retelling of The Odyssey as modern mythology, was published in 2018 with Nightwood Editions.

Army of the Brave and Accidental was shortlisted for the 2019 ReLit Award for fiction.

== Awards ==
- 2008 Gerald Lampert Award

== Works ==
- Making Bones Walk, (poems) Luna Publications, 2007, ISBN 978-0-9781471-1-2
- I.V. Lounge Nights, Editors Myna Wallin, Alex Boyd, Tightrope Books, 2008, ISBN 978-0-9783351-4-4
- Best Canadian Essays, 2009, Editors Carmine Starnino, Alex Boyd, Tightrope Books, 2009, ISBN 978-1-926639-05-5
- Best Canadian Essays, 2010, Editors Kamal Al-Solaylee, Alex Boyd, Tightrope Books, 2010, ISBN 978-1-926639-17-8
- The Least Important Man, (poems) Biblioasis, 2012, ISBN 978-1-926845-40-1
- Army of the Brave and Accidental (novel) Nightwood Editions, 2018 ISBN 978-0-88971-341-3
