= Stevie Howell =

Irish-Canadian writer and psychometrist

Stevie Howell is an Irish-Canadian writer and psychometrist.

Her debut book of poetry, called ^^^^^^ ^^^^^^ ^^^^^^ (also known as "Sharps"), was a finalist for the 2015 Gerald Lampert Award.

Her chapbook Summer was shortlisted for the bpNichol Chapbook Award.

A second book of poetry, I left nothing inside on purpose, was released in 2018 by McClelland & Stewart, an imprint of Penguin Random House Canada, and won the Raymond Souster Award in 2019, and was a finalist for the Trillium Book Award.

From 2017 to 2019, Howell was the poetry editor for This Magazine. From 2019 to 2020 she was the Poet-in-Residence at Arc Poetry Magazine.

She lives in Victoria, B.C.

== Bibliography ==
- ^^^^^^ ^^^^^^ ^^^^^^ [Sharps] (2014) Goose Lane Editions
- Summer (2016) Desert Pets Press.
- I left nothing inside on purpose. (2018). McClelland & Stewart
