= Steel Bananas =

Steel Bananas is a Canadian artist collective and publishing house.

== History ==
Established in 2008 in Toronto, Ontario, Canada, the frequency of their publications has varied from monthly (2008-2010), to quarterly (2011-2013), to annual chapbooks and interdisciplinary projects in various media (2014+). Originally established as a collective of young artists, writers, and university students in Toronto, the collective matured into a network of professional artists and a dedicated publishing house that expanded into Vancouver, British Columbia, Canada, and Leeds, United Kingdom under the leadership of Karen Correia da Silva and Curran Folkers.

== Major works ==
- Overachiever. Leeds, UK, 2015–2016.
- Works in the Public Domain. Leeds, UK, 2015-ongoing.
- Lucy. Vancouver and Toronto, Ontario, Canada, 2014-ongoing.
- Trigger Warning: Demons. Toronto, Ontario, Canada, 2014.
- Steel Bananas Publications. Toronto and Vancouver, British Columbia, Canada and Leeds, UK, 2012-ongoing.
- Verbs. Vancouver, British Columbia, Canada, 2012.
- Bruised / Modern Ruin. Toronto, Ontario, Canada, 2010–2011.
- The Artichoke Revue. Toronto, Ontario, Canada, 2010.
- Eggplant. Toronto, Ontario, Canada, 2009–2010.
- Gulch: An Assemblage. Toronto, Ontario, Canada, 2009.
- Steel Bananas Zine. Toronto, Ontario, Canada, 2008–2010.

== Major publications ==
- A State, A Statue, A Statute by Adam Abbas, 2014.
- Hate Letters from Buddhists by Dave Hurlow, 2014.
- Sew with Butterflies by Anna Veprinska, 2014.
- Free Agent by Katrina Pruss, 2014.
- East Van Sound by Karen Correia da Silva, 2014.
- Public Consultation by Curran Folkers, 2014.
- Publics by yta, 2012.
- Dear Adolf by Daniel Scott Tysdal, 2012.
- Fuck Irony by Matt Marshall and Karen Correia da Silva, 2012.
