= Stacey May Fowles =

Canadian writer

Stacey May Fowles (born 1979) is a Canadian writer.

Fowles first novel, Be Good, was published by Tightrope Books in 2007. In fall 2008 she released a novel illustrated by Marlena Zuber called Fear of Fighting, and later staged a theatrical adaptation of it with Nightwood Theatre. The novel was selected as a National Post Canada Also Reads pick for 2010.

Her book, Baseball Life Advice: Loving the Game that Saved Me, essays about baseball in general and the Toronto Blue Jays in particular, was published by McClelland & Stewart in 2017.

Her writing has appeared in various magazines and journals, including The Walrus, Taddle Creek, Prism, Kiss Machine, Quill & Quire, and the National Post. She has been widely anthologized in Nobody Passes: Rejecting The Rules of Gender and Conformity; First Person Queer; Yes Means Yes; I.V. Lounge Nights; and PEN Canada's Finding The Words. Most recently, she co-edited the anthology She's Shameless: Women write about growing up, rocking out and fighting back.

== Bibliography ==
=== Books ===
- Be Good. Toronto: Tightrope, 2007.
- Fear of Fighting. Halifax: Invisible Publishing, 2008.
- "Infidelity: A Novel". ECW Press, 2013.
