= Joanne Arnott =

Canadian writer

- Born: 16 December 1960 (age 65); Winnipeg, Manitoba, Canada
- Occupations: Writer, poet, editor
- Writing career
- Language: English
- Genres: Poetry, children's literature, non-fiction
- Notable work: Wiles of Girlhood
- Notable awards: Gerald Lampert Award

Joanne Arnott (born 16 December 1960 in Winnipeg, Manitoba) is a Canadian writer.

== Career ==
Arnott has conducted writing workshops across much of Canada and in Australia, including a series at the Carnegie Centre, sponsored by SFU, and has written for the Literary Review of Canada.

She is a founding member of the Aboriginal Writers Collective West Coast and The Aunties Collective. As a member of the Alliance of Women Against Racism, Etc., she facilitated Unlearning Racism workshops for colleges, universities, government and community groups in Canada throughout the 1990s. She has served on The Writers Union of Canada National Council (2009), The Writers Trust of Canada Authors Committee, and as jury member for the Governor General's Awards/Poetry (2011). She is the Poetry Editor for Event Magazine.

== Awards ==
She received the Gerald Lampert Award for her 1991 collection of poetry Wiles of Girlhood.

== Personal ==
Arnott lives in British Columbia with her family.

== Bibliography ==
=== Poetry ===
- Wiles of Girlhood (Press Gang, 1991)
- My Grass Cradle (Press Gang, 1992)
- Steepy Mountain: love poetry (Kegedonce, 2004)
- Mother Time: Poems New & Selected (Ronsdale, 2007)
- Longing: Four Poems on diverse matters (Rubicon, chapbook with Aaron Paquette, 2008)
- The Family of Crow (Leaf Press, chapbook with various artists, 2012)
- A Night for the Lady (Ronsdale, 2013)
- Halfling Spring: an internet romance (Kegedonce, 2013)

=== Children's literature ===
- Ma MacDonald (Women's Press, 1993; illustrated by Maryanne Barkhouse)

=== Non-fiction ===
- "Joanne Arnott: World Poetry Day 2009: Part 1", May 7, 2009
- Breasting the Waves: On Writing and Healing (Press Gang, 1995)

=== Blogs ===
- Joanne Arnott
- Vera Manuel Tribute

== See also ==
- List of writers from peoples indigenous to the Americas
