= Chris Banks (poet) =

Canadian poet (born 1970)

Chris Banks (born 1970) is a Canadian poet.

== Biography ==
Born 1970, Banks grew up in Stayner, Sioux Lookout and Bancroft. He received a Bachelor of Arts from the University of Guelph, before moving on to complete a Masters of Arts in Creative Writing from Concordia University and later a Bachelor of Education from the University of Western Ontario. Banks later began teaching at Bluevale Collegiate Institute in Waterloo, Ontario.

Banks' works include a chapbook, Form Letters (2002). His first full-length collection, Bonfires, was awarded the Jack Chalmers Award for poetry by the Canadian Authors' Association in 2004. Bonfires was also a finalist for the Gerald Lampert Award for best first book of poetry in Canada. In 2023, one of his sonnets was published in The Walrus.

== Awards and recognition ==
- 2004: Canadian Authors Association, winner of poetry award, Bonfires
- 2004: Finalist for Gerald Lampert Award for poetry, Bonfires
- 2006: Gowlings Literary Award

== Bibliography ==
- 2002: Form Letters, Junction Books (chapbook)
- 2003: Bonfires, Nightwood Editions
- 2006: Sparrows and Arrows, Bilbioasis (chapbook)
- 2006: The Cold Panes of Surfaces, Nightwood Editions
- 2011: Winter Cranes, ECW Press
- 2015: Invaders, Anstruther Press, (chapbook)
- 2017: The Cloud Versus Grand Unification Theory, ECW Press
- 2019: MidLife Action Figure, ECW Press
- 2021: Shadow Forecast, Floodlight Editions (chapbook)
- 2021: Deep Fake Serenade, Nightwood Editions
- 2023: Alternator, Harbour Publishing

== See also ==
- Canadian literature
- Canadian poetry
- List of Canadian poets
- List of Canadian writers
