= Karen Enns =

Canadian poet

Karen Enns is a Canadian poet based in Victoria, British Columbia. She is most noted for her 2017 collection Cloud Physics, which won the Raymond Souster Award for poetry in 2018.

Enns published her debut poetry collection That Other Beauty in 2010, and was shortlisted for the Gerald Lampert Award in 2011. Her second collection, Ordinary Hours, followed in 2014.

== Works ==
- That Other Beauty (2010)
- Ordinary Hours (2014)
- Cloud Physics (2017)
