= Gerald Lampert =

Canadian writer and educator

Gerald Lampert (c. 1924 - April 29, 1978) was a Canadian writer and educator, best known as the organizer of one of Canada's first annual educational workshop series for aspiring writers.

Born in Toronto, Ontario, Lampert was educated at Wayne State University. The owner of an advertising agency in Toronto, he was a part-time creative writing instructor at Ryerson Polytechnic and York University, and an active member of the Writers' Union of Canada. He organized the first Creative Writers Workshop in 1968 after noticing that a 1967 issue of Saturday Review listed over 40 such workshops and conferences in the United States but none at all in Canada.

During his lifetime, Lampert published the novel Tangle Me No More (1971), and his poetry appeared in numerous anthologies and literary magazines. His second novel, Chestnut Flower Eye of Venus, was published in 1978 shortly after his death.

Following his death, the League of Canadian Poets created the Gerald Lampert Award in his memory.
