= Beverly Little Thunder =

Native American activist (1947–2025)

- Beverly Little Thunder giving an interview in 2019.
- Born: 1947; Standing Rock Reservation
- Died: August 25, 2025 (aged 77)
- Citizenship: Standing Rock Reservation, U.S.
- Occupations: Nurse, Activist, Native American Affairs
- Known for: LGBT activism

Beverly Little Thunder (1947 – August 25, 2025) was a two-spirit Lakota woman and enrolled citizen of the Standing Rock Reservation. She lived in Huntington, Vermont with her spouse.

She helped coin the term two-spirit, and founded the Women's Sundance.

== Biography ==
Beverly Little Thunder's mother went to the Flandreau Indian School as a child, an American Indian boarding school. She said her mother and aunt were punished there for speaking the Lakota language. Little Thunder went to three boarding schools (Note: One of the schools was Intermountain Indian School in Utah.) as a child, and a church-run orphanage, where she said a nun had abused her. She ran away at 13 years old.

She was present at Wounded Knee, South Dakota during the Wounded Knee Occupation in 1973. After coming out in 1985, she was turned away from her community and left. She joined the Gay American Indians during the 1980s, and was a nurse during the peak of the HIV/AIDS pandemic. Little Thunder helped create the term "two-spirit" in the 1990s. She said the term had been chosen due to two-spirit people embodying both the masculine and the feminine in many tribes. She later said she found it offensive non-Natives had begun identifying with the term, saying "It's a privilege white people don't realize that they're using". She founded the Women's Sun Dance, which is held annually.

In 2016, Little Thunder published her memoir, One Bead at a Time. The leadership of Oceti Sakowin held a ceremony for her and other two-spirit people after they arrived at the #NoDAPL resistance camp.

She joined the Vermont Commission on Native American Affairs in 2019, where her job was to develop policy and initiatives to benefit Native Americans in the state. She resigned in 2023, saying she had experienced misogyny, and that members of the Commission were falsely claiming Indigenous identity. She said the Commission had initially been mostly women, but men joined and began to act dismissive towards them.

Little Thunder was invited to visit the White House in 2024, for a Pride Month event. She discussed her efforts to increase BIPOC land ownership in the Green Mountains during an interview. She received a Lifetime Achievement award at the 37th annual International Two-Spirit gathering the same year.

Her brother Ron Wesley Little Thunder died on February 2, 2025. She died at the age of 77 on August 25, 2025. She was survived by her spouse Pam and five children.
