= Abdulrahman bin Abdulaziz Al Kelya =

Abdulrahman bin Abdulaziz Al Kelya (Arabic: عبد الرحمن بن عبد العزيز الكلية) is a judge in the judiciary of Saudi Arabia. He was the first Chief Justice of the Supreme Court of Saudi Arabia, an office which he held from 2009 to 2013.

== Career ==
Al Kelya has served as a judge in various Saudi courts for 40 years, including as Chief Judge in the Court of Cassation in Mecca. In 2009, he was described in an article in Arab News as "one of the most experienced personalities in the field of Saudi law".

In February 2009, Al Kelya was appointed as Chief Justice of the Supreme Court. The Supreme Court was created by King Abdullah as part of his wide-ranging judicial reforms announced in 2007, and Al Kelya was the first chief justice to be appointed. His appointment was one of a number of changes to the judiciary intended to create a court system more in line with international practices. In January 2013, Al Kelya stepped down as Chief Justice. The decree announcing the change, according to Arab News, said he "has been relieved of the position upon his request".

== See also ==
- Legal system of Saudi Arabia
