= Thomas Grey (poet) =

English poet (1863–1928)

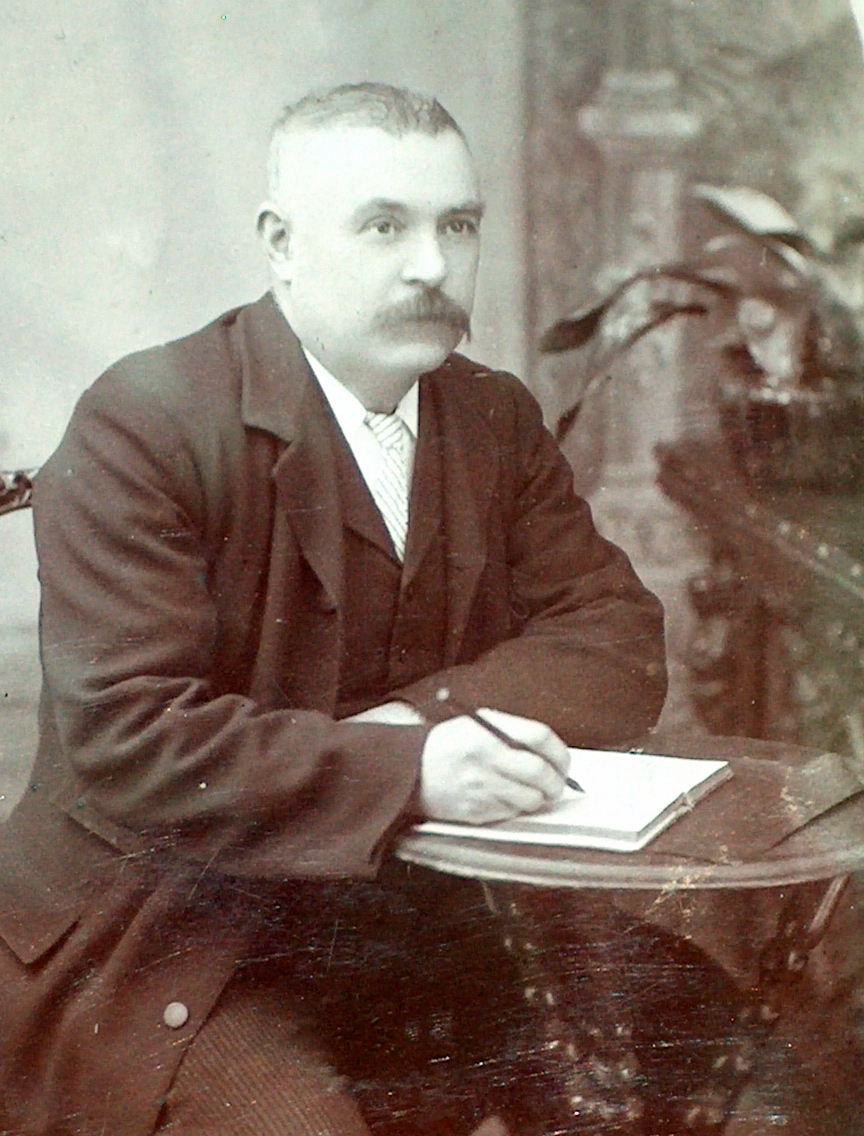
- Thomas Grey c. 1899 with a pen and paper
- Born: 16 September 1863; Norham, Northumberland, England
- Died: 14 August 1928 (aged 64); Northumberland, England
- Resting place: Tweedmouth Cemetery
- Occupations: Poet, Railway worker
- Spouse: Esther Glenwright
- Writing career
- Subjects: World War I, Scottish Borders, Rail transport
- Notable works: Musings on the Footplate; Poems on the Great War

Thomas Grey (1863–1928) was an English poet who wrote about his local area of the Scottish Borders, the First World War and rail transport.

== Life and railway work ==
Thomas Grey was born on 16 September 1863 at Shoreswood, Norham, in Northumberland. He worked on trains for much of his life for the North Eastern Railway. On 3 July 1887 he married Esther Glenwright at South Shields and they resided in Berwick-upon-Tweed. Grey died on 14 August 1928 and is buried in Tweedmouth Cemetery.

== Poetry ==
Grey was variously known as the Border Poet, Engine Driver Poet and Footplate Poet. Much of his output appeared in the local press and was never independently published during his lifetime. He was one of the best known writers of Border Poetry, and for some years he was the writer of Tweedmouth Topics in a Border Newspaper, relinquishing this post due to illness in the last 20 years of his life. He also wrote in “The Wheatsheaf” (the Co-operative Movement’s Official Magazine).

In 1916 he was honoured for his work by being made a Fellow of the International Institute of British Poetry. In November 1916, at the request of the Royal Normal College in London (now known as The Royal National College for the Blind), Grey sent them 200 copies of his “effusions” which were then printed in Braille type.

== Publications ==
- Musings on the Footplate, 1906, printed by Martins the Printers, Berwick-upon-Tweed
- Poems on the Great War, (posthumously) March 2015, printed by Martins the Printers, Berwick-upon-Tweed

== Achievements ==
- President of the Tweedmouth Co-operative Society.
- Secretary of the Tweedmouth Ratepayers Association.
- Founder Member of the NER Pensions Society.
- Founder Member and First President of the Tweedmouth Burns Club.
- Member of the St Andrews & St Johns Ambulance
- Freemason attached to a Dunbar Lodge.

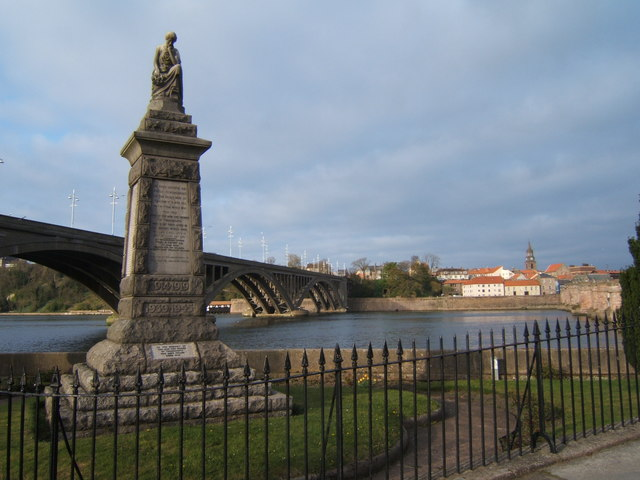
War Memorial, Tweedmouth

Grey was the instigator of the erection of the Tweedmouth War Memorial (on which 111 men are commemorated) and founder member of the group promoting a fund for the remaining money needed for the erection of the Memorial in July 1921.
