= Raymond Souster Award =

Canadian literary award

The Raymond Souster Award is a Canadian literary award, presented by the League of Canadian Poets to a book judged as the best work of poetry by a Canadian poet in the previous year.

The award was presented for the first time in 2013, and was named in honour of Canadian poet Raymond Souster.

== Nominees and winners ==
Year	Author	Title	Ref.
2013	A. F. Moritz	The New Measures	
2013	John Wall Barger	Hummingbird	
2013	Nancy Holmes	The Flicker tree: Okanagan Poems	
2013	Mark Lavorato	Wayworn Wooden Floors	
2013	Emily McGiffin	Between Dusk and Night	
2013	Pamela Porter	no ordinary place	
2014	Anne Compton	Alongside	
2014	Jen Butler	Seldom Seen Road	
2014	Catherine Graham	Her Red Hair Rises with the Wings of Insects	
2014	Vancy Kasper	Rebel Women	
2014	John Terpstra	Brilliant Falls	
2014	Russell Thornton	Birds, Metals, Stones and Rain	
2015	Patrick Lane	Washita	
2015	Catherine Kidd	Hyena Subpoena	
2015	Susan Paddon	Two Tragedies in 429 Breaths	
2015	Laisha Rosnau	Pluck	
2015	Adam Sol	Complicity	
2015	Rachel Zolf	Janey's Arcadia	
2016	Lorna Crozier	The Wrong Cat	
2016	Marilyn Dumont	The Pemmican Eaters	
2016	Maureen Hynes	The Poison Colour	
2016	Alice Major	Standard Candles	
2016	Bruce Meyer	The Arrow of Time	
2016	Armand Garnet Ruffo	The Thunderbird Poems	
2017	Louise Bernice Halfe	Burning in this Midnight Dream	
2017	Barry Dempster	Disturbing the Buddha	
2017	Beth Everest	silent sister: the mastectomy poems	
2017	Elee Kraljii Gardiner	Serpentine Loop	
2017	Steven Heighton	The Waking Comes Late	
2017	Dean Steadman	Après Satie – For Two and Four Hands	
2018	Karen Enns	Cloud Physics	
2018	Billy-Ray Belcourt	This Wound Is a World	
2018	Puneet Dutt	The Better Monsters	
2018	Benjamin Hertwig	Slow War	
2018	Cornelia Hoogland	Trailer Park Elegy	
2018	Canisia Lubrin	Voodoo Hypothesis	
2019	Stevie Howell	I left nothing inside on purpose	
2019	Adam Dickinson	Anatomic	
2019	Alice Major	Welcome to the Anthropocene	
2019	David Martin	Tar Swan	
2019	Jim Nason	Rooster, Dog, Crow	
2019	Kim Trainor	Ledi	
2020	Roxanna Bennett	Unmeaningable	
2020	Billy-Ray Belcourt	NDN Coping Mechanisms	
2020	Sonnet L'Abbé	Sonnet's Shakespeare	
2020	Cassidy McFadzean	Drolleries	
2020	Shane Neilson	New Brunswick	
2020	Douglas Walbourne-Gough	Crow Gulch	
2021	Ian Williams	Word Problems	
2021	Sadiqa de Meijer	The Outer Wards	
2021	Klara du Plessis	Hell Light Flesh	
2021	Jessie Jones	The Fool	
2021	Michael Prior	Burning Province	
2021	John Elizabeth Stintzi	Junebat	
2022	Roxanna Bennett	The Untranslatable I	
2022	Síle Englert	The Lost Time Accidents	
2022	Louise Bernice Halfe	awâsis – kinky and dishevelled	
2022	Leah Horlick	Moldovan Hotel	
2022	D. A. Lockhart	Bearmen Descend Upon Gimli	
2022	Adam Sol	Broken Dawn Blessings	
2022	John Wall Barger	Resurrection Fail	
2023	Adebe DeRango-Adem	Vox Humana	
2023	Aaron Kreuter	Shifting Baseline Syndrome	
2023	Alycia Pirmohamed	Another Way to Split Water	
2023	Olive Senior	Hurricane Watch: New and Collected Poems	
2023	Sarah Yi-Mei Tsiang	Grappling Hook	
2023	Matthew James Weigel	Whitemud Walking	
2024	Bradley Peters	Sonnets from a Cell	
2024	Roxanna Bennett	Uncomfortability	
2024	Brandi Bird	The All + Flesh	
2024	D. M. Bradford	Bottom Rail on Top	
2024	Wanda John-Kehewin	Spells, Wishes, and the Talking Dead: ᒪᒪᐦᑖᐃᐧᓯᐃᐧᐣ ᐸᑯᓭᔨᒧᐤ ᓂᑭᐦᒋ ᐋᓂᐢᑯᑖᐹᐣ mamahtâwisiwin, pakosêyimow, nikihci-âniskotâpân	
2024	T. Liem	Slows: Twice	
2025	Chimwemwe Undi	Scientific Marvel	
2025	Manahil Bandukwala	Heliotropia	
2025	Zehra Naqvi	The Knot of My Tongue	
2025	Jane Shi	echolalia echolalia	
2025	Rob Taylor	Weather	
2025	shō yamagushiku	shima	
