= Soraya Peerbaye =

Canadian writer

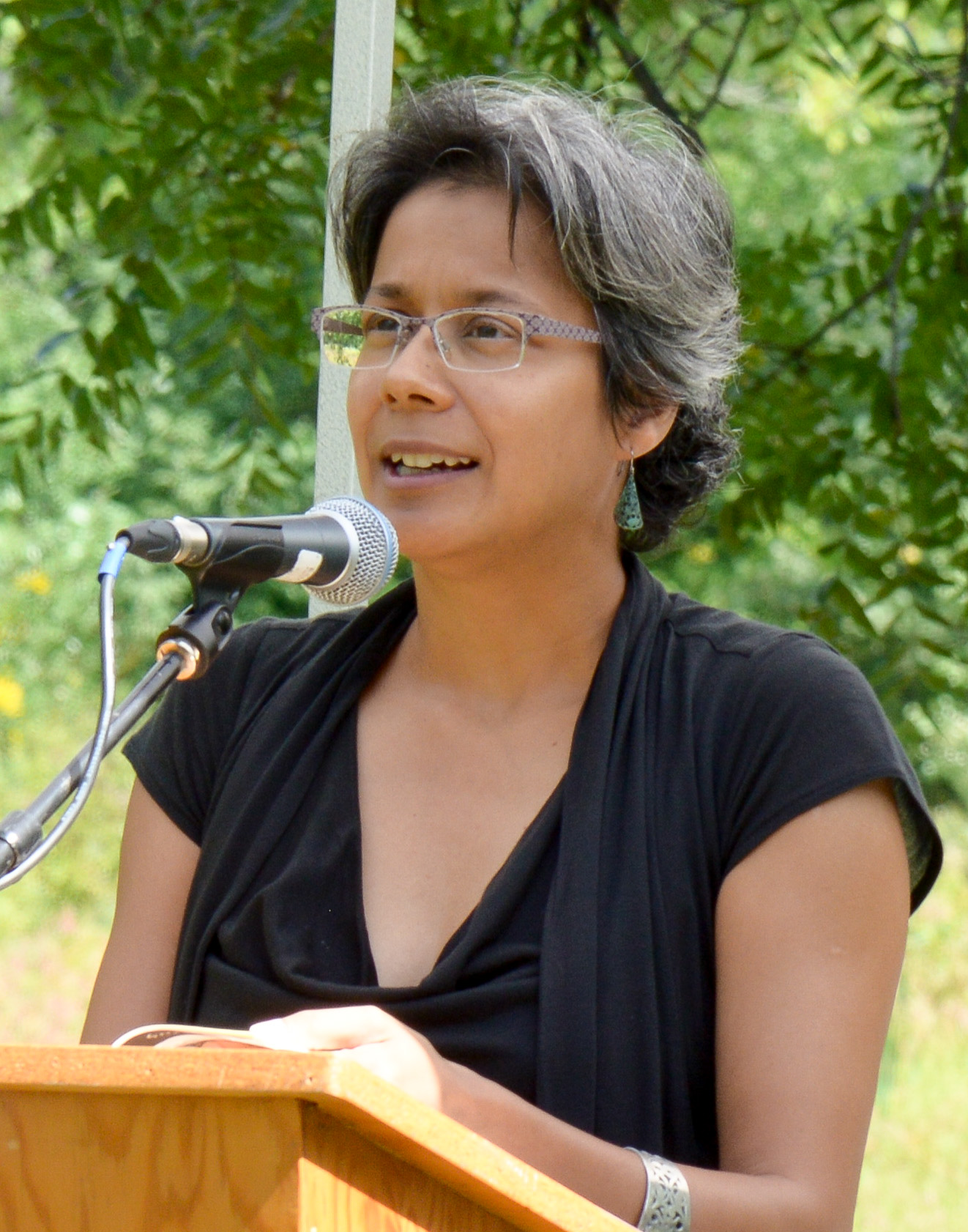
Peerbaye at the Eden Mills Writers' Festival in 2016

Soraya Peerbaye is a Canadian writer. She was a shortlisted nominee for the Gerald Lampert Award in 2010 for her poetry collection Poems for the Advisory Committee on Antarctic Names, and for the Griffin Poetry Prize in 2016 for Tell: poems for a girlhood.

She was born in London, Ontario to Indo-Mauritian immigrant parents from Mauritius. She was educated at York University and the University of Guelph, and is currently based in Toronto.
