= Susan Paddon =

Canadian poet

Susan Paddon is a Canadian poet. Her debut collection Two Tragedies in 429 Breaths, published in 2015, was a finalist for the Raymond Souster Award and the ReLit Award for Poetry, and won the J. M. Abraham Poetry Award.

Originally from St. Thomas, Ontario, she attended McGill University and Concordia University in Montreal. She currently resides in Margaree, Nova Scotia.
