= Gerald Lampert Award =

Canadian poetry award

The Gerald Lampert Memorial Award is an annual literary award presented by the League of Canadian Poets to the best volume of poetry published by a first-time poet. It is presented in honour of poetry promoter Gerald Lampert. Each winner receives an honorarium of $1000.

In its earliest years, the award was not necessarily limited to poetry, but was presented to the year's best first book by a Canadian writer in either poetry or prose.

== Winners and nominees ==
=== 1980s ===
Gerald Lampert Award winners and nominees
Year	Poet	Title	Result	Ref.
1981	Elizabeth Allan	The Shored Up House	Winner	
1982	Edna Alford	A Sleep Full of Dreams	Winner	
1982	Abraham Boyarsky	Schielber	Winner	
1983	Diana Hartog	Matinee Light	Winner	
1984	Jean McKay	Gone to Grass	Winner	
1984	Sandra Birdsell	Night Travellers	Winner	
1985	Paulette Jiles	Celestial Navigation	Winner	
1986	Joan Fern Shaw	Raspberry Vinegar	Winner	
1987	Rosemary Sullivan	The Space a Name Makes	Winner	
1988	Di Brandt	Questions I Asked My Mother	Winner	
1988	Beverly Daurio	If Summer Had a Knife	Shortlist	
1988	Janet Simpson-Cooke	Future Rivers	Shortlist	
1989	Sarah Klassen	Journey to Yalta	Winner	

=== 1990s ===
Year	Poet	Title	Result	Ref.
1990	Steven Heighton	Stalin's Carnival	Winner	
1990	Nancy Mattson	Maria Breaks Her Silence	Shortlist	
1990	Bruce Meyer	The Open Room	Shortlist	
1990	Kim Morrissey	Batoche	Shortlist	
1990	Bruce Taylor	Cold Rubber Feet	Shortlist	
1991	Diana Brebner	Radiant Life Forms	Winner	
1991	Lesley-Anne Bourne	The Story of Pears	Shortlist	
1991	Michael Redhill	Impromptu Feats of Balance	Shortlist	
1991	Ronn Silverstein	Diary of a Glass Blower in Solitude	Shortlist	
1992	Joanne Arnott	Wiles of Girlhood	Winner	
1993	Elisabeth Harvor	Fortress of Chairs	Winner	
1993	Roberta Rees	Eyes Like Pigeons	Winner	
1994	Barbara Klar	The Night You Called Me a Shadow	Winner	
1994	Ilya Tourtidis	Mad Magellan's Tale	Winner	
1995	Keith Maillard	Dementia Americana	Winner	
1996	Maureen Hynes	Rough Skin	Winner	
1996	Kevin Connolly	Asphalt Cigar	Shortlist	
1996	Esta Spalding	Carrying Place	Shortlist	
1996	Terry Watada	A Thousand Homes	Shortlist	
1996	Sue Wheeler	Solstice on the Anacortes Ferry	Shortlist	
1997	Marilyn Dumont	A Really Good Brown Girl	Winner	
1997	Mike Barnes	Calm Jazz Sea	Shortlist	
1997	Ronna Bloom	Fear of the Ride	Shortlist	
1997	Margo Button	The Unhinging of Wings	Shortlist	
1997	Crispin Elsted	Climate and the Affections	Shortlist	
1997	Tonja Gunvaldsen Klaassen	Clay Birds	Shortlist	
1997	Richard Sanger	Shadow Cabinet	Shortlist	
1997	Diane L. Tucker	God on His Haunches	Shortlist	
1998	Mark Sinnett	The Landing	Winner	
1998	Jill Battson	Hard Candy	Shortlist	
1998	Damian Lopes	Towards the Quest	Shortlist	
1998	Barbara Mulcahy	The Man With the Dancing Monkey	Shortlist	
1998	Carmine Starnino	The New World	Shortlist	
1999	Stephanie Bolster	White Stone: The Alice Poems	Winner	

=== 2000s ===
Year	Poet	Title	Result	Ref.
2000	Shawna Lemay	All the God-Sized Fruit	Winner	
2000	Lynn Davies	The Bridge That Carries the Road	Shortlist	
2000	David O'Meara	Storm Still	Shortlist	
2000	Rachel Rose	Giving My Body to Science	Shortlist	
2000	Terence Young	The Island in Winter	Shortlist	
2001	Anne Simpson	Light Falls Through You	Winner	
2002	Aislinn Hunter	Into the Early Hours	Winner	
2003	Kathy Mac	Nail Builders Plan for Strength and Growth	Winner	
2003	Nancy Jo Cullen	Science Fiction Saint	Shortlist	
2003	Michael deBeyer	Rural Night Catalogue	Shortlist	
2003	Sharron Proulx-Turner	what the auntys say	Shortlist	
2003	Christine Wiesenthal	Instruments of Surrender	Shortlist	
2004	Adam Getty	Reconciliation	Winner	
2004	Chris Banks	Bonfires	Shortlist	
2004	Jill Hartman	A Painted Elephant	Shortlist	
2004	Alison Pick	Question & Answer	Shortlist	
2004	Ali Riley	Wayward	Shortlist	
2005	Ray Hsu	Anthropy	Winner	
2005	Geoffrey Cook	Postscript	Shortlist	
2005	Susan Downe	Little Horse	Shortlist	
2005	A. J. Levin	Monk's Fruit	Shortlist	
2005	Steve McOrmond	Lean Days	Shortlist	
2006	Suzanne Buffam	Past Imperfect	Winner	
2007	Steven Price	Anatomy of Keys	Winner	
2008	Alex Boyd	Making Bones Walk	Winner	
2008	Joshua Auerbach	Radius of Light	Shortlist	
2008	Alison Calder	Wolf Tree	Shortlist	
2008	Dymphny Dronyk	Contrary Infatuations	Shortlist	
2008	Kim Goldberg	Ride Backwards on Dragon	Shortlist	
2008	Erin Knight	The Sweet Fuels	Shortlist	
2009	Katia Grubisic	what if red ran out	Winner	
2009	Adam Chiles	Evening Land	Shortlist	
2009	Jeramy Dodds	Crabwise to the Hounds	Shortlist	
2009	Kate Eichhorn	Fond	Shortlist	
2009	Sachiko Murakami	The Invisibility Exhibit	Shortlist	
2009	Johanna Skibsrud	Late Nights With Wild Cowboys	Shortlist	

=== 2010s ===
Year	Poet	Title	Result	Ref.
2010	James Langer	Gun Dogs	Winner	
2010	Kate Hall	The Certainty Dream	Shortlist	
2010	Marcus McCann	Soft Where	Shortlist	
2010	Soraya Peerbaye	Poems for the Advisory Committee on Antarctic Names	Shortlist	
2010	Marguerite Pigeon	Inventory	Shortlist	
2010	Robert Earl Stewart	Something Burned Along the Southern Border	Shortlist	
2011	Anna Swanson	The Nights Also	Winner	
2011	Susan Briscoe	The Crow’s Vow	Shortlist	
2011	Karen Enns	That Other Beauty	Shortlist	
2011	Jeff Latosik	Tiny, Frantic, Stronger	Shortlist	
2011	Nikki Reimer	[sic]	Shortlist	
2011	Clea Roberts	Here Is Where We Disembark	Shortlist	
2012	Sarah Yi-Mei Tsiang	Sweet Devilry	Winner	
2012	Kirsty Elliot	True	Shortlist	
2012	Rosemary Griebel	Yes	Shortlist	
2012	Suzanne Robertson	Paramita	Shortlist	
2012	Lisa Shatzky	Do Not Call Me By My Name	Shortlist	
2012	Leslie Vryenhoek	Gulf	Shortlist	
2013	Gillian Savigny	Notebook M	Winner	
2013	James Arthur	Charms Against Lightning	Shortlist	
2013	Nora Gould	I see my love more clearly from a distance	Shortlist	
2013	Mathew Henderson	The Lease	Shortlist	
2013	Nyla Matuk	Sumptuary Laws	Shortlist	
2013	Andrew McEwan	Repeater	Shortlist	
2014	Murray Reiss	The Survival Rate of Butterflies in the Wild	Winner	
2014	Jordan Abel	the place of scraps	Shortlist	
2014	Laurie D. Graham	Rove	Shortlist	
2014	Julie Joosten	Light Light	Shortlist	
2014	Emilia Nielsen	Surge Narrows	Shortlist	
2014	Juleta Severson-Baker	Incarnate	Shortlist	
2015	Kayla Czaga	For Your Safety Please Hold On	Winner	
2015	Sylvia D. Hamilton	And I Alone Escaped to Tell You	Shortlist	
2015	Stevie Howell	Sharps	Shortlist	
2015	Kerry Lee Powell	Inheritance	Shortlist	
2015	Suzannah Showler	Failure to Thrive	Shortlist	
2015	Anne-Marie Turza	The Quiet	Shortlist	
2016	Ben Ladouceur	Otter	Winner	
2016	Melissa Bull	Rue	Shortlist	
2016	Chad Campbell	Laws & Locks	Shortlist	
2016	Raoul Fernandes	Transmitter and Receiver	Shortlist	
2016	Cassidy McFadzean	Hacker Packer	Shortlist	
2016	Derek Webster	Mockingbird	Shortlist	
2017	Ingrid Ruthig	This Being	Winner	
2017	Christopher Gudgeon	Assdeep in Wonder	Shortlist	
2017	Jennifer Houle	The Back Channels	Shortlist	
2017	John Nyman	Players	Shortlist	
2017	Margo Wheaton	The Unlit Path Behind the House	Shortlist	
2017	Banoo Zan	Songs of Exile	Shortlist	
2018	Emily Nilsen	Otolith	Winner	
2018	Billy-Ray Belcourt	This Wound is a World	Shortlist	
2018	Jack Davis	Faunics	Shortlist	
2018	Wendy Donawa	Thin Air of the Knowable	Shortlist	
2018	Julie Paul	The Rules of the Kingdom	Shortlist	
2018	Phoebe Wang	Admission Requirements	Shortlist	
2019	T. Liem	Obits.	Winner	
2019	Tanis Franco	Quarry	Shortlist	
2019	Mikko Harvey	Unstable Neighbourhood Rabbit	Shortlist	
2019	Jenny Haysom	Dividing the Wayside	Shortlist	
2019	Klara du Plessis	Ekke	Shortlist	
2019	Shazia Hafiz Ramji	Port of Being	Shortlist	

=== 2020s ===
Year	Poet	Title	Result	Ref.
2020	Heather Birrell	Float and Scurry	Winner	
2020	Laura Cok	Doubter's Hymnal	Shortlist	
2020	Paola Ferrante	What to Wear While Surviving a Lion Attack	Shortlist	
2020	Thomas King	77 Fragments of a Familiar Ruin	Shortlist	
2020	Alessandra Naccarato	Re-Origin of Species	Shortlist	
2020	Matthew Walsh	these are not the potatoes of my youth	Shortlist	
2021	Bertrand Bickersteth	The Response of Weeds	Winner	
2021	Jillian Christmas	the gospel of breaking	Shortlist	
2021	Valerie Mason-John	I Am Still Your Negro	Shortlist	
2021	Bahar Orang	Where Things Touch	Shortlist	
2021	Tyler Pennock	Bones	Shortlist	
2021	Natasha Ramoutar	Bittersweet	Shortlist	
2022	Alisha Kaplan	Qorbanot: Offerings	Winner	
2022	Selina Boan	Undoing Hours	Shortlist	
2022	D. M. Bradford	Dream of No One but Myself	Shortlist	
2022	Dallas Hunt	Creeland	Shortlist	
2022	Matsuki Masutani	I will be more myself in the next world	Shortlist	
2022	Tom Prime	Mouthfuls of Space	Shortlist	
2022	Bardia Sinaee	Intruder	Shortlist	
2023
2023	Matthew James Weigel	Whitemud Walking	Winner	
2023	Manahil Bandukwala	Monument	Shortlist	
2023	Skylar Kay	Transcribing Moonlight	Shortlist	
2023	Anne Marie Todkill	Orion Sweeping	Shortlist	
2023	Délani Valin	Shapeshifters	Shortlist	
2023	Sanna Wani	My Grief, the Sun	Shortlist	
2024	Hannah Green	Xanax Cowboy	Winner	
2024	Britta Badour	Wires That Sputter	Shortlist	
2024	Brandi Bird	The All + Flesh	Shortlist	
2024	Maggie Burton	Chores	Shortlist	
2024	Laila Malik	Archipelago	Shortlist	
2024	A. Light Zachary	More Sure	Shortlist	
2025	Marc Perez	Dayo	Winner	
2025	Faith Arkorful	The Seventh Town of Ghosts	Shortlist	
2025	Ellen Chang-Richardson	Blood Belies	Shortlist	
2025	Nathanael Jones	Aqueous	Shortlist	
2025	Barbara Tran	Precedented Parroting	Shortlist	
2025	Chimwemwe Undi	Scientific Marvel	Shortlist	
