= Jason Guriel =

Canadian poet and critic

Jason Guriel is a Canadian poet and critic.

== Works ==
=== Poetry ===
- Technicolored. Exile Editions. 2006. ISBN 9781550960037.
- Pure Product. Véhicule Press. 2009.
- Satisfying Clicking Sound. Véhicule Press. 2014.
- Forgotten Work. Biblioasis. 2020.
- The Full-Moon Whaling Chronicles. Biblioasis. 2023.

=== Criticism and essays ===
- The Pigheaded Soul. The Porcupine's Quill. 2014.
- On Browsing. Biblioasis. 2022.

== Awards ==
- 2007 Frederick Bock Prize
- 2009 Editors Prize For Book Reviewing, poetry
