= Jim Nason =

Canadian writer from Toronto, Ontario, Canada

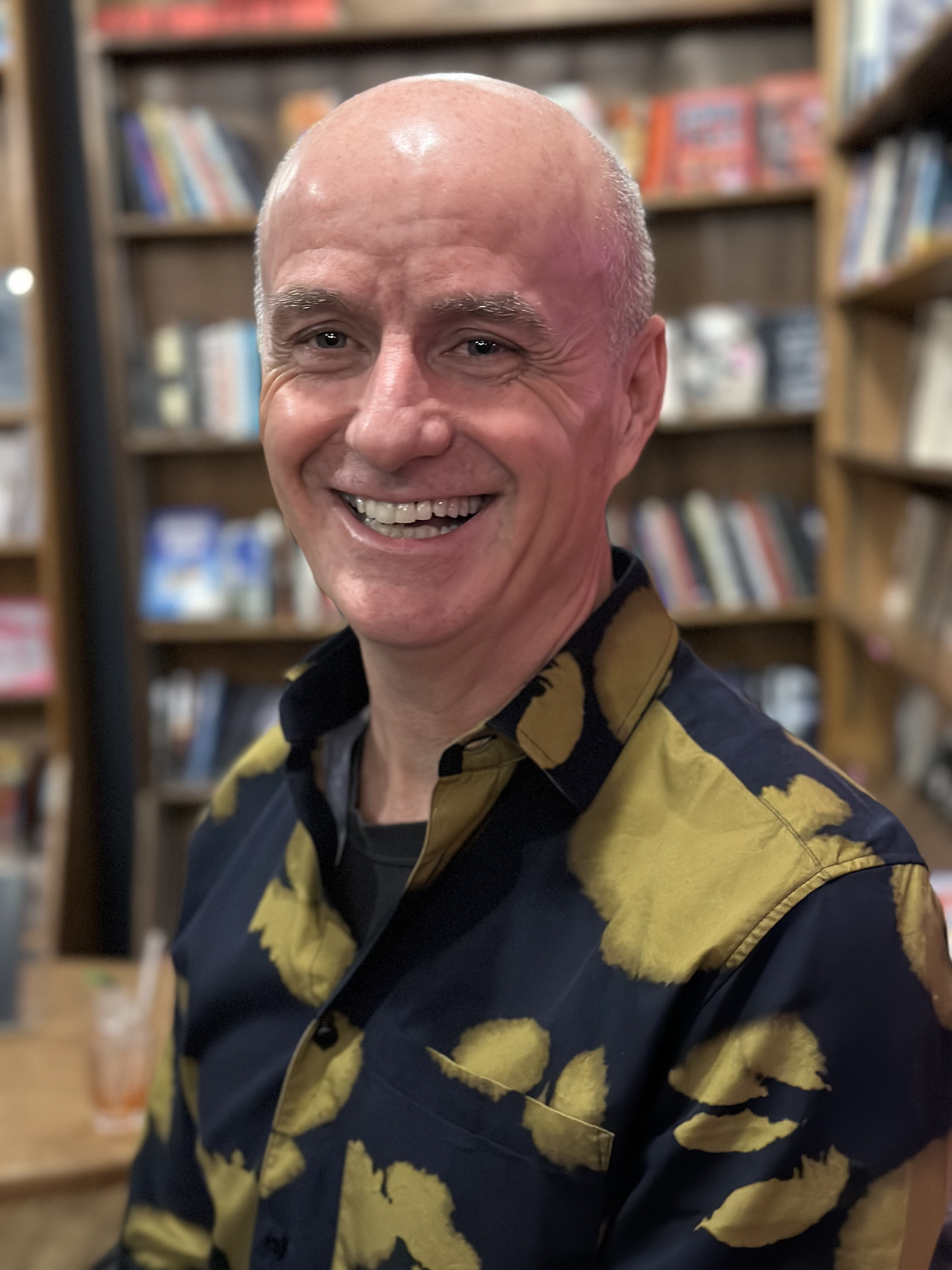
Jim Nason at Glad Day Bookshop, Toronto, Canada in 2023

Jim Nason is a Canadian writer from Toronto, Ontario. He is most noted for his poetry collection Rooster, Dog, Crow, which was a shortlisted finalist for the Raymond Souster Award in 2019.

He has also been nominated for several ReLit Awards, receiving nods in the Poetry category for Narcissus Unfolding in 2012 and Touch Anywhere to Begin in 2017, and in the Short Fiction category for The Girl on the Escalator in 2012.

He published his debut poetry collection If Lips Were As Red in 1991, but put his writing career on hold for a number of years to work as a caregiver for people with HIV/AIDS. He returned to writing in the 2000s following the death of his partner, publishing the poetry collection The Fist of Remembering in 2006 and the novel The Housekeeping Journals, based in part on his own experiences as a caregiver, in 2007.

He became the owner and publisher of Tightrope Books in 2014.

== Works ==
=== Novels ===
- The Housekeeping Journals - 2007
- I Thought I Would Be Happy - 2013
- Spirit of a Hundred Thousand Dead Animals - 2017

=== Short Fiction ===
- The Girl on the Escalator - 2011

=== Poetry ===
- If Lips Were As Red - 1991
- The Fist of Remembering - 2006
- Narcissus Unfolding - 2011
- Music Garden - 2013
- Touch Anywhere to Begin - 2016
- Rooster, Dog, Crow - 2018
- Blue Suitcase: Documentary Poetics - 2021
- Self-Portrait Embracing a Fabulous Beast - 2023
