= Judiciary of Saudi Arabia =

Saudi system of Islamic law courts

The judiciary of Saudi Arabia is a branch of the government of Saudi Arabia that interprets and applies the laws of Saudi Arabia. The legal system is based on the Islamic code of Sharia, with its judges and lawyers forming part of the country's religious leadership or ulama. There are also non-Sharia government tribunals which handle disputes relating to specific royal decrees. Final appeal from both Sharia courts and government tribunals is to the King of Saudi Arabia and all courts and tribunals follow Sharia rules of evidence and procedure.

== Sharia courts ==
The Sharia courts have general jurisdiction over most civil and criminal cases. At present, there are two types of courts of first instance: general courts and summary courts dealing with lesser cases. Cases are adjudicated by single judges, except criminal cases in which the potential sentence is death, amputation, or stoning, when there is a panel of three judges. There are also two courts for the Shia minority in the Eastern Province dealing with family and religious matters. Appellate courts sit in Mecca and Riyadh and review decisions for compliance with Sharia.

== Non-Sharia tribunals ==
There are also non-Sharia courts covering specialized areas of law, including the Board of Grievances, the Specialized Criminal Court, created in 2008, and the Supreme Court. The Board of Grievances was originally created to deal with complaints against the government, but also gained jurisdiction over commercial and some criminal cases, such as bribery and forgery, and acts as a court of appeal for a number of non-Sharia government tribunals. These administrative tribunals, referred to as "committees", deal with specific issues regulated by royal decrees, such as labor and commercial law.

== Judges ==
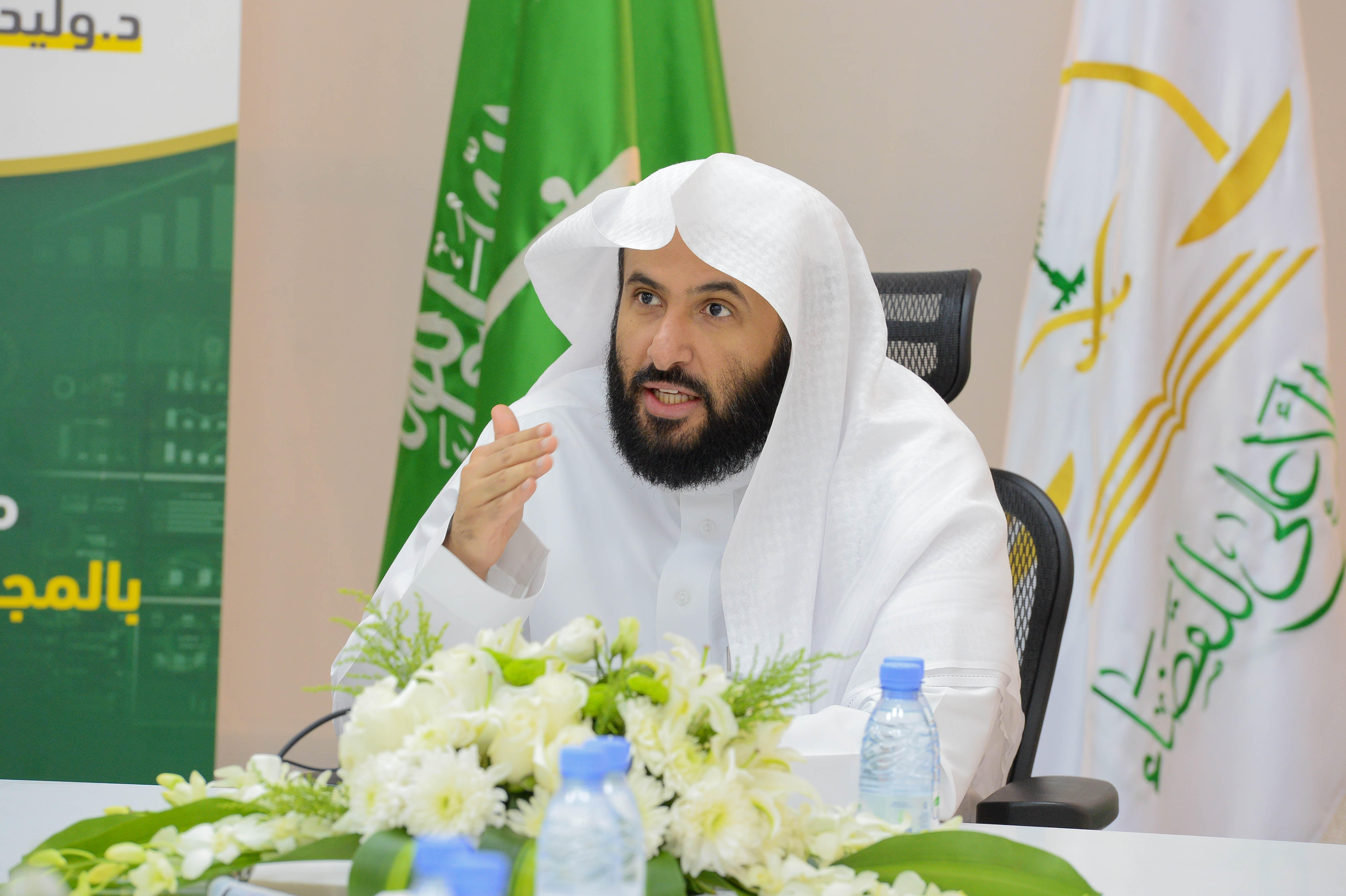
Walid bin Mohammed Al Samani, current Justice Minister since 2015

The judicial establishment, in the broadest sense, is composed of qadis, who give binding judgements in specific court cases, and muftis and other members of the ulama, who issue generalized but highly influential legal opinions (fatwas). The Grand Mufti (currently, Abdul-Aziz Al ash-Sheikh) is the most senior member of the judicial establishment as well as being the highest religious authority in the country; his opinions are highly influential among the Saudi judiciary. The judiciary proper (that is, the body of qadis) is composed of about 700 judges.

Qadis generally have degrees in Sharia law from an Islamic university recognized by the Saudi government with, in many cases, a post-graduate qualification from the Institute of Higher Judiciary in Riyadh. The training received from such Sharia law degrees is entirely religious in character and is based on the Qu'ran and centuries old religious treatises with no reference to, for example, modern commercial issues. Although most judges have been educated and appointed under the current system, some of the older judges received the traditional qadi's training of years of instruction by a religious mentor in a mosque.

The capabilities and reactionary nature of the judges have been criticized. The main complaint reportedly made by Saudis privately is that judges, who have wide discretion in interpreting the Sharia, have no knowledge, and are often contemptuous, of the modern world. Reported examples of judges' attitudes include rulings banning such things as the children's game Pokémon, telephones that play recorded music, and sending flowers to hospital patients. Saudi judges come from a narrow recruitment pool. By one estimate, 80% are from Al-Qassim province, the conservative religious heartland of Saudi Arabia in the center of the country. Senior judges will only allow like-minded graduates of select religious institutes to join the judiciary and will remove judges that stray away from rigidly conservative judgments.

== Reform and development ==
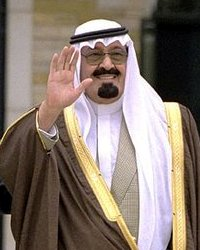
King Abdullah has ordered a number of reforms of the judiciary, since ascending the throne

The Saudi system of justice has been criticized for being slow, arcane, lacking in some of the safeguards of justice and unable to deal with the modern world. In 2007, King Abdullah issued royal decrees with the aim of reforming the judiciary and creating a new court system. The reforms have yet to be implemented in full but, once they are, will include the creation of a Supreme Court, and the transfer of the Board of Grievances' commercial and criminal jurisdictions to a restructured general court system. New specialist first instance courts will be established comprising general, criminal, personal status, commercial and labor courts. The Sharia courts will therefore lose their general jurisdiction to hear all cases and the work load of the government's administrative tribunals will be transferred to the new courts. Another important change is the establishment of appeal courts for each province. It has been claimed that the reforms will establish a system for codifying Sharia and incorporating the principle of judicial precedent into court practice.

In 2008, the Specialized Criminal Court was created. The court tries suspected terrorists and human rights activists. On 26 June 2011, the court started trials of 85 people suspected of being involved in Al-Qaeda in the Arabian Peninsula and the 2003 Riyadh compound bombings, and in September 2011 another 41 al-Qaeda suspects appeared in the court. In the same year, the court held trial sessions of human rights activists, including Mohammed Saleh al-Bejadi, co-founder of the Saudi Civil and Political Rights Association (ACPRA) and Mubarak Zu'air, a lawyer for long-term prisoners, and a protester, Khaled al-Johani, who spoke to BBC Arabic Television at a protest in Riyadh. The court convicted 16 of the human rights activists to sentences of 5–30 years on 22 November 2011.

In 2009, the King made a number of significant changes to the judiciary's personnel at the most senior level by bringing in a younger generation. For example, as well as appointing a new Minister of Justice, a new chairman of the Supreme Judicial Council was appointed. The outgoing chairman was known to oppose the codification of Sharia. The king also appointed a new head of the Board of Grievances and Abdulrahman Al Kelya as the first chief justice of the new Supreme Court.

== See also ==
- Legal system of Saudi Arabia
- Human rights in Saudi Arabia
