= Sharron Proulx-Turner =

Two-spirit Métis writer (1953–2016)

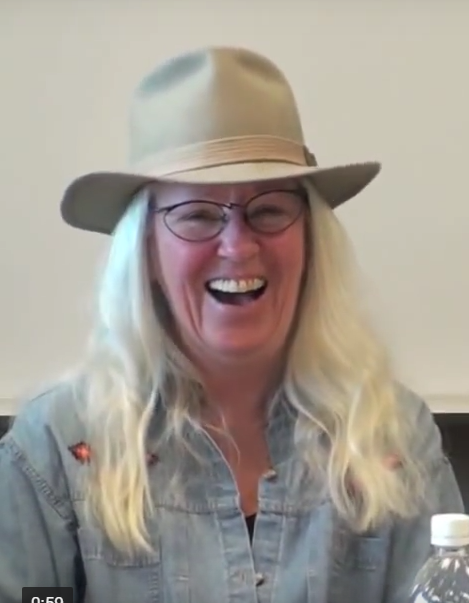
- Proulx-Turner in 2009
- Born: April 21, 1953; Metcalfe, Ontario
- Died: 2016 (aged 62–63); Calgary, Alberta
- Occupation: Writer
- Children: 2

Sharron Proulx-Turner (pseudonym, Becky Lane; d. November 2016) was a two-spirit Métis writer. She investigated themes of Métis storytelling and was recognized as a mentor to other writers.

== Early life and education ==
Sharron Proulx-Turner was born on April 21, 1953, in Metcalfe, Ontario, and her ancestry is of Mohawk, Huron-Wendat, Algonquin, Ojibwe, Mi'kmaw, French, Scottish, and Irish peoples. She was a member of the Métis Nation of Alberta. Proulx-Turner was diagnosed with dyslexia and other learning challenges as a young girl, but on her fourth birthday, Proulx-Turner received a dictionary from her "Nokomis," which in Ojibwe translates to grandmother. Proulx-Turner would point to a word and her, grandmother would tell her a story. This was when Proulx-Turner learned to love language.

Proulx-Turner earned her undergraduate and master's degrees in English, focusing on Feminist Bio-theory, at the University of Calgary.

== Career ==
Her first publication, Where the Rivers Join: A Personal Account of Healing from Ritual Abuse, was published under the pseudonym Becky Lane to protect her identity as her life was still endangered.

Her writing covers a variety of genres: poetry, memoir, and mixed-genre historical fiction. She is widely anthologized, appearing in Double Lives: Writing and Motherhood, Crisp Blue Edges: Indigenous Creative Non-Fiction, My Home as I Remember, and An Anthology of Canadian Native Literature in English. Proulx-Turner acted as a mentor to writers in the Canadian literature community, particularly for emerging Indigenous writers, and advocated on behalf of the field of Indigenous literature and its writers. She created opportunities for Two-Spirit and gender non-conforming people in ceremony and in writing communities. Spirituality was an integral part of Proulx-Turner's writing process.

In the fourth-grade, Proulx-Turner wrote her first poem and went on to publish a memoir, collections of poetry and a mixed genre historical fiction. Proulx-Turner has also been published in several anthologies and literary journals throughout her career before her death from cancer in 2016. In 2017, her final publication was released posthumously by Kegedonce Press, in honor of her. Since then, she has had a dedication to her written in the Auto/Biography Studies Journal.

== Death and legacy ==
After she was diagnosed with cancer, the Indigenous Studies Literary Studies Association hosted a roundtable on her works: "Decolonial Solidarities and the Work of Sharron Proulx-Turner" which brought together writers to reflect on her influence as an activist, editor, and mentor. After her death in 2016, the themes in her writing were the focus of a symposium held in her honour, entitled creole métisse of french canada, me, and held November 23–24, 2018 at the University of Calgary.

As she wrote in her book, One Bead at a Time, the purpose of her writing is to: "...give back to the women and children whose stories so often go untold. To give back to the spirits of the Indigenous children that have been and are still missing."

== Selected works ==
Publications & Contributions	Publication Date	Description
creole métisse of french canada, me	2017	
One Bead at a Time: A Memoir by Beverly Little Thunder	2016	This memoir is an oral narrative of Beverly Little Thunder's stories that have been transcribed by Proulx-Turner.
Anthology of Canadian Native Literature In English	2013	Her poem "a horse's nest egg is very large" was featured with an introduction from Proulx-Turner describing her relationship with her Métis grandmother.
the trees are still bending south	2012	
Salish Seas: an anthology of text + image	2011	
iLit Remix: A Revolution of Text Forms	2011 Aug	
iLit Strength and Struggle: Perspectives From First Nations, Inuit, and Métis Peoples in Canada	2011 May	
She is Reading Her Blanket with Her Hands: The Dedication Poems	2008	Dedicated to Proulx-Turner's Mother
she walks for days inside a thousand eyes: a two-spirit story	2008	A book of poems, that delve into life a two-spirited woman.
What the auntys say	2002	
Where the Rivers Join: A Personal Account of Healing from Ritual Abuse	1995	Proulx-Turner published under her pseudonym, Becky Lane. Her memoir was the first book she published after graduating from the University of Calgary.
