= Ijeoma Umebinyuo =

Nigerian-American writer

- Born: Lagos, Nigeria
- Occupations: Writer, Curator

Ijeoma Umebinyuo is a Nigerian-American writer. Her short stories and poems have appeared in publications such as The Stockholm Review of Literature, The Rising Phoenix Review and The MacGuffin. Her TEDx talk was called "Dismantling The Culture of Silence". She has a book of poems called Questions for Ada and her work has been translated into many languages, including Turkish, Portuguese, Russian and French. Her work has been translated, published, and cited in multiple languages and literary publications. It has appeared in Speech and Silence Anthology, published by Columbia University Press, Literarische Diverse, The NYU Black Renaissance Noire, Neue Rundschau, The MacGuffin, Antología Internacional de Poesía Feminista, Oireserío: A Poetic Anthology for the Rivers of the Five Continents, Wild Imperfections: An Anthology of Womanist Poems (edited by Natalia Molebatsi) and other publications.

== Early life ==
Ijeoma Umebinyuo was born in Lagos, in Nigeria. Educated in both Nigeria and the United States, she attended undergraduate and graduate school in the United States. Umebinyuo published her first poetry collection, Questions for Ada, in 2015. The collection was named one of the best-selling poetry books of all time by Shortform and recognized by African Arguments as one of Africa’s Must-Read Books of 2018. In 2016, she was named one of the top ten contemporary writers with origins in Sub-Saharan Africa by Writivism.

Works

- Questions for Ada
- Dismantling The Culture of Silence
- Things We Lost In The Fire
