= Ken Babstock =

Canadian poet

Ken Babstock (born 19 January 1970) is a Canadian poet. He was born in Newfoundland and raised in the Ottawa Valley. Babstock began publishing his poems in journals and anthologies, winning gold at the 1997 Canadian National Magazine Awards. He lives in Toronto, Ontario.

== Early years ==
Babstock discovered poetry in his teens, growing up in Pembroke, Ontario, in the Ottawa Valley.

== Career and awards ==
Babstock's first collection in 1999, Mean, won him the Milton Acorn Award and the 2000 Atlantic Poetry Prize. According to the official edition of 1999, Mean is a "stunning exploration of the threshold and divide between our primeval origins and the meanness of our everyday lives." Babstock has since published a second collection, Days into Flatspin, which has also come in for high critical praise.

He was the winner of a K.M. Hunter Award. His poems have won gold at the National Magazine Awards, have been anthologized in Canada and the United States, and have been translated into Dutch, Serbo-Croatian, and Latvian.

Babstock worked as Poetry Faculty at the Banff Centre for the Arts and lives in Toronto, Ontario.

Babstock's collection, Airstream Land Yacht, won the Trillium Book Award, was shortlisted for the 2007 Canadian Griffin Poetry Prize, and was nominated for the 2006 Governor General's Award for poetry.

Babstock's collection Methodist Hatchet, won the 2012 Canadian Griffin Poetry Prize. In 2014, he won the inaugural Latner Writers' Trust Poetry Prize.

Babstock published a book-length poem, On Malice, in 2014. His most recent collection is Swivelmount, released in late 2020 from Coach House Books, and was shortlisted for the ReLit Award for poetry in 2021.

== See also ==
- Canadian literature
- Canadian poetry
- List of Canadian poets
- List of Canadian writers
