= Carmine Starnino =

Canadian poet, essayist, educator and editor

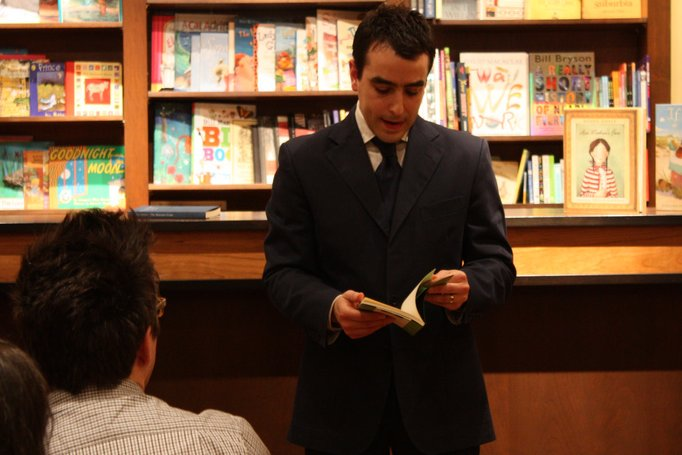
Carmine Starnino launching This Way Out at Ben McNally, April 16, 2009

Carmine Starnino is a Canadian poet, essayist, educator and editor.

== Biography ==
He was born in 1970 in Montreal, Quebec, into an Italian heritage. His first poetry collection The New World (1997) was nominated for the 1997 A. M. Klein Prize for Poetry and the 1997 Gerald Lampert Award. His second collection Credo (2000) won the 2001 Canadian Authors Associate Prize for Poetry and the 2001 David McKeen Award for Poetry. He has also written A Lover's Quarrel (2004), a book of essays on Canadian poetry, and With English Subtitles (2004), a third collection of poems, which won a Bressani Award and the A.M. Klein Prize for Poetry. Starnino's fourth collection, This Way Out (2009), was nominated for a Governor General's Literary Award for Poetry and, again, won the A.M. Klein Prize for Poetry. Starnino went on to publish Lazy Bastardism (2012), a collection of essays and reviews, and Leviathan (2016) a book of poems. His most recent book, published in 2020, Dirty Words: Selected Poems 1997-2016, was awarded the inaugural Pier Giorgio Di Cicco Poetry Award, and was praised by the jury for having "expanded the English language by bringing Italian words into its matrix."

He is the editor of Signal Editions, the poetry imprint of Montreal-based Véhicule Press, and was formerly Editor-in-Chief of Maisonneuve and Senior Editor of Reader's Digest Canada. Starnino left his post as Deputy Editor of The Walrus in 2019 to move back to Montreal, and currently serves as the magazine's Editor-in-Chief.

Starnino is well known for the provocative nature of his criticism and pointedness of his opinions, which have incited a variety of heated counter-criticisms from other poets and critiques.

== Bibliography ==
=== Poetry ===
- The New World. Montreal: McGill-Queen's University Press, 1997.
- Credo. Montreal: McGill-Queen's University Press, 2000.
- With English Subtitles. Kentville, N.S.: Gaspereau Press, 2004.
- This Way Out. Kentville, N.S.: Gaspereau Press, 2009.
- Leviathan. Kentville, N.S.: Gaspereau Press, 2016.
- Dirty Words: Selected Poems 1997-2016. Kentville, N.S.: Gaspereau Press, 2020.

=== Essays ===
- A Lover's Quarrel. Erin, Ont.: Porcupine's Quill, 2004.
- Lazy Bastardism. Kentville, N.S.: Gaspereau Press, 2012.

=== As editor ===
- David Solway: Essays on His Works. Toronto: Guernica, 2001.
- The New Canon. Montreal: Véhicule Press, 2005.
- John Glassco and the Other Montreal. Victoria: Frog Hollow Press, 2011.
- The Best Canadian Poetry in English 2012. Toronto: Tightrope, 2012.
- The Essential Charles Bruce. Erin Mills: The Porcupine's Quill, 2018.
