= Sonnet L'Abbé =

Canadian poet and critic

- Born: September 24, 1973 (age 53); Toronto, Ontario, Canada
- Occupation: Poet

Sonnet L'Abbé (born September 24, 1973) is a Canadian poet, editor, professor and critic. As a poet, L'Abbé writes about national identity, race, gender and language.

== Career ==
L'Abbé has a PhD in English literature from the University of British Columbia, a master's degree in English literature from the University of Guelph and a BFA in film and video from York University. They have been a script reader and taught English at universities in South Korea, as well as teaching creative writing at the University of Toronto. From 2012 to 2014, they taught creative writing at UBC's Okanagan campus, and they currently teach at Vancouver Island University. In 2015, they were the Edna Staebler Writer-in-Residence at Wilfrid Laurier University.

As a critic, they were a reviewer of fiction and poetry for The Globe and Mail and have written scholarly articles on Canadian contemporary poetry. They also worked as an assistant poetry editor at Canadian Literature and were an occasional contributor to CBC Radio One and the National Post. L'Abbé was the guest editor of the Best Canadian Poetry 2014 anthology. They are currently on the editorial board of Brick Books and on the poetry editorial board of The Malahat Review.

Their work has appeared in a number of literary journals and several anthologies including Rising Tides, Force Field: 77 BC Women Poets, Best Canadian Poetry 2009, Best Canadian Poetry 2010, Open Field: 30 Contemporary Canadian Poets and Red Silk: An Anthology of South Asian Canadian Women Poets. They were shortlisted for the 2010 CBC Literary Award for poetry and won the Bronwen Wallace Memorial Award for most promising writer under 35. In 2013, they were the Artist-in-Motion for 2017StartsNow!, a series of talks launched by CBC Radio-Canada, Via Rail and Community Foundations of Canada that joined Canadians across the country in a conversation about how to celebrate the Canadian sesquicentennial.

== Family ==
L'Abbé was born in Toronto, Ontario, to Jason L'Abbé, a Franco-Ontarian ceramic artist, and Janet L'Abbé, an artist of Guyanese Dougla descent (South Asian and African mixed descent). Their name, Sonnet, is a combination of parts of their parents' first names.

== Books ==
- A Strange Relief (McClelland and Stewart, 2001)
- Killarnoe (McClelland and Stewart, 2007)
- Best Canadian Poetry in English 2014 (guest editor, Tightrope Books, 2014)
- Anima Canadensis (chapbook, Junction Books, 2016)
- Sonnet's Shakespeare (2019)

== Awards ==
- Malahat Review Long Poem Prize, 1999
- Bronwen Wallace Memorial Award, 2000
- Shortlist, CBC Literary Award (Poetry), 2010
- bpNichol Chapbook Award, 2017
- Shortlist, Dorothy Livesay Poetry Prize, 2020
