= Anna Swanson =

Canadian poet

Anna Swanson is a Canadian poet.

In May 2011, Swanson received a Lambda Literary Award for Lesbian Poetry for her debut poetry collection, The Nights Also. In June, she received the Gerald Lampert Award for Best First Book of Poetry.

In 2023, Swanson's poem "Sweetness" was shortlisted for the CBC Poetry Prize.

In 2026, her poetry collection The Garbage Poems won the Lambda Literary Award for Bisexual Poetry.
