= League of Canadian Poets =

Canadian non-profit arts organization

The League of Canadian Poets (LCP), founded in 1966, is a national non-profit arts service organization based in Toronto, Ontario, Canada. The organization acts as the national association of professional and aspiring poets in Canada. The League counts Lillian Allen, John Barton, bill bissett, Phil Hall, Susan McCaslin, Erín Moure, Gay Allison, Micheline Maylor and Margaret Atwood among its membership; it provides funding for poetry readings and competitions, hosts an annual AGM, runs a series of awards, and publishes an electronic newsletter.

== Membership ==
Members of the League are professional poets who are actively contributing to the development, growth, and public profile of poetry in Canada. They offer two primary levels of membership, as well as student and supporting memberships, open to Canadian citizens and permanent residents.

Full members are poets with an established poetic career, whether with a published book of poetry or a background in performance and spoken word poetry.

Associate members are poets working towards establishing their careers. Poet Bruce Meyer helped to establish the associate level of membership in the 1970s to enable young poets to join the League.

== Awards ==
The League organizes the annual Pat Lowther Memorial Award, the Gerald Lampert Award, and the Raymond Souster Award. The recipient of each award receives an cash honorarium, and there is an administration fee of $25 for each submission.

The Pat Lowther Memorial Award is named after Pat Lowther, and is for a book of poetry by a Canadian woman published in the preceding year. It was given to Anne Simpson in 2008.

The Gerald Lampert Award, named after arts administrator and writer Gerald Lampert, is for a first book of poetry published by a Canadian. Anna Swanson was given the award in 2011 for The Nights Also. Previous winners include Katia Grubisic in 2009 for What if red ran out, and Alex Boyd in 2008 for Making Bones Walk.

The Raymond Souster Award is given for a book of poetry by a League member published in the preceding year. The winner is given a $2000 prize, and the winning book is presented at the LCP AGM.

== See also ==
- List of Canadian poets
