= List of writers from Alberta =

The Canadian province of Alberta has produced writers across a wide variety of genres. This list includes notable writers who were born in Alberta or spent a significant portion of their writing career living in Alberta.

== A ==
- Mark Abley (born 1955), poet, journalist, non-fiction writer
- Caroline Adderson (born 1963), novelist, short story writer
- Herbert Bealey Adshead (1862–1932)
- Rona Altrows (born 1948), short story writer, children's writer
- Doris Anderson (1921–2007), journalist
- Robert T. Anderson (1880–1960), poet
- Wayne Arthurson (living), novelist
- Gloria Chomiak Atamanenko (1932–2017)
- Damien Atkins (living), playwright
- Makram Ayache (living), playwright

== B ==
- Todd Babiak (living), novelist
- Chris Bailey (born 1989)
- John Barton (born 1957), poet
- David Bashow (born 1946)
- Karen Bass (born 1962), novelist
- Tara Beagan (born 1975), playwright
- Maureen U. Beecher (1935–2025), historian
- Billy-Ray Belcourt (living), poet, essayist
- Kirti Bhadresa (living), short story writer
- Bertrand Bickersteth (living), poet
- Earle Birney (1904–1995), poet, novelist
- Eric Bishop (1926–2000), sports journalist
- Kate Braid (born 1947), poet
- Brian Brennan (1943–2021)
- Eva Brewster (1922–2004)
- Andrew Brook (born 1943), philosopher
- Sigmund Brouwer (born 1959), novelist, children's writer
- Robin Brownlee (1958–2024), sports journalist
- Ronnie Burkett (living), playwright
- Murdoch Burnett (1953–2015), poet
- Sharon Butala (born 1940), novelist
- Jim Butterfield (1936–2007), technical writer

== C ==
- John Caird (born 1948), playwright
- David E. Campbell, political scientist
- Sue Campbell (1956–2011), philosopher
- David Carpenter (born 1941), poet, novelist, short story writer
- Elaine M. Catley (1889–1984), poet
- Douglas Century (living), journalist, non-fiction writer
- Weyman Chan (born 1963), poet
- Corinna Chong (living), novelist
- S. D. Clark (1910–2003), sociologist
- Ken Coates (born 1956), historian
- Morton N. Cohen (1921–2017)
- Cam Cole (born 1953), sports journalist
- Desmond Cole (born 1982), journalist
- Mikael Colville-Andersen (living), screenwriter
- Joey Comeau (born 1980), novelist
- Bob Comfort (1940–2010), screenwriter
- Karen Connelly (born 1969), poet
- Charles F. P. Conybeare (1860–1927), poet
- Belinda Cornish (living), playwright
- Christa Couture (living), memoirist
- Carys Cragg (living), non-fiction writer
- Susanne Craig (born 1968), journalist
- Caleigh Crow (living), playwright
- Harold F. Cruickshank (1893–1979), pulp-fiction author
- Nancy Jo Cullen (living), poet, novelist
- Francine Cunningham (born 1984), poet, novelist, short story writer

== D ==
- Brenda Davis (living), cookbook writer
- Erin Davis (living), journalist, memoirist
- A. M. Dellamonica (born 1968), novelist, short story writer
- Geoff Dembicki (living), journalist, non-fiction writer
- Lotta Dempsey (1905–1988), journalist
- JD Derbyshire (died 2025), playwright, novelist
- Myrna Dey (living), novelist
- Marcello Di Cintio (living), non-fiction writer
- Gordon R. Dickson (1923–2001), science fiction writer
- Allan Donaldson (1929–2022), novelist, short story writer
- Candas Jane Dorsey (born 1952), poet, novelist
- Bruce Dowbiggin (living), sports journalist
- Stan Dragland (1942–2022), novelist
- Eric Duhatschek (born 1956), sports journalist
- Judith Duncan (living), novelist
- Jeffrey Dvorkin (born 1946), journalist
- Rand Dyck (born 1943), political scientist

== E ==
- Bob Edwards (1860–1922), journalist, humorist
- Wilfrid Eggleston (1901–1986), journalist
- Ophira Eisenberg (born 1972), memoirist
- Mercedes Eng (living), poet
- John A. English (born 1940), non-fiction writer
- Miranda Esmonde-White (born 1949), non-fiction writer

== F ==
- James Fell (born 1968), historian
- Jen Ferguson (living), novelist
- Will Ferguson (born 1964), travel writer, novelist
- Adam Fletcher (living), non-fiction writer
- Cheryl Foggo (born 1956), memoirist, novelist
- Sam Forster (born 1996), journalist, poet
- Michael J. Fox (born 1961), memoirist
- J. Michael Francis (born 1968), historian
- Marvin Francis (1955–2005), poet
- Chrystia Freeland (born 1968), journalist, non-fiction writer
- Gayleen Froese (born 1972), novelist
- Susannah Fullerton (born 1960), historian

== G ==
- David Gaider (living), novelist
- Barb Galler-Smith (living), novelist
- Zsuzsi Gartner (born 1960), journalist, non-fiction writer
- Shree Ghatage (born 1957), novelist
- John Patrick Gillese (1920–1999), novelist, short story writer
- Curtis Gillespie (living), novelist, short story writer
- Clyde Gilmour (1912–1997), journalist
- Erving Goffman (1922–1982), sociologist
- Bruce L. Gordon (born 1963), philosopher
- Nora Gould (living), poet
- Terry Goulet (living), historian
- Katherine Govier (born 1948), novelist, essayist
- Nick Green (living), playwright
- Leslie Greentree (living), poet, short story writer
- Jacqueline Guest (born 1952), novelist

== H ==
- Abby Hagyard (living), playwright
- Helen Hajnoczky (born 1985), poet
- Louise Bernice Halfe (born 1953), poet
- Stephen Harper (born 1959), non-fiction writer
- Claire Harris (1937–2018), poet
- Diana Hart (born 1963)
- Jill Hartman (born 1974), poet
- Sparkle Hayter (born 1958), journalist, novelist
- Tyler Hellard (living), novelist
- Lee Henderson (living), novelist, short story writer
- Benjamin Hertwig (living), poet
- Barb Higgins (born 1962), journalist
- Robert Hogg (1942–2022), poet
- Tarah Hogue (living), non-fiction writer
- Nancy Holmes (born 1959), poet
- Rand Holmes (1942–2002), novelist, comics writer
- Emma Hooper (living), novelist
- Jan Hudson (1954–1990), novelist
- Katherine Hughes (1876–1925), journalist, non-fiction writer
- David L. Humphreys (born 1939), journalist, biographer
- Beverly Hungry Wolf (born 1950), non-fiction writer, novelist
- Andrew Hunt (born 1968), historian
- Bruce Hunter (born 1952), poet, novelist, non-fiction writer
- Tina Hunter (born 1985), novelist
- Mel Hurtig (1932–2016), non-fiction writer
- Glen Huser (born 1943), novelist
- Nancy Huston (born 1953), novelist, essayist
- Hazel Hutchins (living), children's writer

== I ==
- Neamat Imam (born 1971), novelist
- Dorothy Inglis (1926–2013)
- Sally Ito (born 1964), poet

== J ==
- Heidi L. M. Jacobs (living), novelist
- Marie Jakober (1941–2017), novelist
- Mark Anthony Jarman (born 1955), novelist, short story writer
- Wanda John-Kehewin (living), poet, novelist
- Jessica Johns (living), novelist
- Susan Juby (born 1969), novelist, humorist

== K ==
- Margo Kane (born 1951), playwright
- Drew Karpyshyn (born 1971), novelist, scriptwriter
- Zoulfa Katouh (born 1994), novelist
- Emily M. Keeler (born 1987), non-fiction writer
- Kaie Kellough (born 1975), poet, novelist
- Richard Kelly Kemick (born 1989), journalist, poet
- Holly Kennedy (living), novelist
- Conor Kerr (living), novelist
- Sandra Kirby (born 1949), sociologist
- Roy Kiyooka (1926–1994), poet
- Samuel Edward Konkin III (1947–2004)
- Andrew Kooman (living), novelist, playwright
- Myrna Kostash (born 1944), journalist, non-fiction writer
- Scaachi Koul (born 1991), journalist, essayist
- John Krizanc (born 1956), playwright
- Robert Kroetsch (1927–2011), novelist, poet, non-fiction writer

== L ==
- Richard Labonté (1949–2022)
- Jonathan Lachlan-Stewart (living), playwright
- Betty Lambert (1933–1983)
- Martine Leavitt (born 1953), novelist
- Fonda Lee (born 1979), novelist
- John Lent (born 1948), poet, novelist
- Ezra Levant (born 1972), journalist, non-fiction writer
- Shar Levine (born 1953), children's writer
- Naomi K. Lewis (born 1976), novelist, non-fiction writer
- Steve Lillebuen (living), journalist, non-fiction writer
- Amanda Lindhout (born 1981), journalist, memoirist
- Ashley Little (born 1983), novelist
- Lynette Loeppky (living), memoirist
- Pearl Luke (born 1958), novelist

== M ==
- Janice MacDonald (living), novelist, non-fiction writer
- Matthew MacKenzie (living), playwright
- Alice Major (living), poet, novelist, essayist
- Stephen Marche (born 1976), novelist, essayist
- Austin Mardon (born 1962), non-fiction writer, children's writer
- Sid Marty (born 1944), non-fiction writer, poet
- Suzette Mayr (born 1967), novelist
- Doris McCarthy (1910–2010), autobiographer
- Nellie McClung (1873–1951), novelist, non-fiction writer, short story writer
- Berend McKenzie (living), playwright
- Barry McKinnon (1944–2023), poet
- Darrel J. McLeod (1957–2024), memoirist
- Marshall McLuhan (1911–1980), philosopher
- Carly Milne (living), journalist, non-fiction writer
- W. O. Mitchell (1914–1998), novelist, playwright
- Frank Moher (born 1955), playwright
- Robert J. H. Morrison (born 1961), non-fiction writer
- Colin Morton (born 1948), poet
- Desmond Morton (1937–2019), historian
- Marie Moser (born 1948), novelist, short story writer
- Omar Mouallem (born 1985), journalist
- Erín Moure (born 1955), poet
- Morgan Murray (living), novelist
- John Murrell (1945–2019), playwright

== N ==
- William D. Naftel (1940–2018), historian
- Shenaaz Nanji (born 1954), novelist, children's writer
- Sean Naylor (living), journalist
- Thorsten Nesch (born 1968), novelist
- Michael J. Neufeld (born 1951), historian
- Marjorie Nichols (1943–1991), journalist, non-fiction writer
- Rosemary Nixon (living), novelist
- Suzanne North (born 1945), novelist

== O ==
- Howard O'Hagan (1902–1982), novelist
- Darren O'Donnell (born 1965), novelist, essayist, playwright
- Sheilagh Ogilvie (born 1958), historian
- Janette Oke (born 1935), novelist
- Peter Oliva (born 1964), novelist
- Wendy Orr (born 1958), novelist, children's writer
- Victor Ostrovsky (born 1949), non-fiction writer
- Mieko Ouchi (born 1969), playwright
- Susan Ouriou (born 1955), novelist, short story writer

== P ==
- Morris Panych (born 1952), playwright
- Aaron Paquette (born 1974), novelist
- Jean Paré (1927–2022), cookbook writer
- Fiona Patton (born 1962), novelist
- Lawrence Pazder (1936–2004), biographer
- Joseph Pearson (born 1975), journalist, essayist
- Kit Pearson (born 1947), novelist
- Robert Young Pelton (born 1955), journalist, non-fiction writer
- Jordan Peterson (born 1962), non-fiction writer
- Alycia Pirmohamed (living), poet
- Frances Fox Piven (born 1932), sociologist
- Lanny Poffo (1954–2023), poet
- Helen Potrebenko (1940–2022)
- Marguerite-A. Primeau (1914–2011)

== Q ==
- Darlene Quaife (born 1948), novelist

== R ==
- A. H. Raskin (1911–1993), journalist
- Kelly Rebar (born 1956), playwright, screenwriter
- Roberta Rees (born 1954), novelist, poet
- D. C. Reid (born 1952), poet, novelist, short story writer
- Pierrette Requier (living), poet and playwright
- Emily Riddle (living), poet
- Gwen Pharis Ringwood (1910–1984), playwright
- Kelly Robson (born 1967), novelist
- Chava Rosenfarb (1923–2011), poet, novelist
- Andy Russell (1915–2005), nature writer
- Charlie Russell (1941–2018), nature writer
- Garry Ryan (living), novelist

== S ==
- Mark Sakamoto (born 1977), memoirist
- Candace Savage (born 1949), non-fiction writer
- Gloria Sawai (1932–2011), novelist
- Barbara Sibbald (living), novelist, journalist
- Beverley Rosen Simons (born 1938), playwright
- Paula Simons (born 1964), journalist
- Jaspreet Singh (born 1969), novelist, poet
- Linda Smith (1949–2007), novelist
- Gail Sidonie Sobat (born 1961), novelist, poet
- George Stanley (1907–2002), historian
- Fred Stenson (born 1951), novelist, non-fiction writer
- Cassie Stocks (born 1966), novelist
- Natalie Sue (living), novelist
- Richard Summerbell (born 1956), non-fiction writer
- Merna Summers (born 1933), short story writer
- Diane Swanson (1944–2021), children's writer

== T ==
- Darcy Tamayose (living), novelist, short story writer
- Cora Taylor (born 1936), novelist, short story writer
- Craig Taylor (born 1976), playwright, non-fiction writer
- Gladys Taylor (1917–2015), novelist
- Timothy Taylor (born 1963), novelist, short story writer, journalist
- Farren Timoteo (living), playwright
- Theresa Tova (born 1955), playwright

== V ==
- Julie Van Rosendaal (living), food writer
- Royce Vavrek (living), playwright

== W ==
- Mark Waddell (living), mystery, comedy and horror novelist
- Colleen Wagner (living), playwright
- Robert R. Wark (1924–2007), historian
- Cyril G. Wates (1883–1946), non-fiction writer, short story writer
- Matthew James Weigel (living), poet
- Michael Wex (born 1954), novelist, playwright
- Denis Whitaker (1915–2001), non-fiction writer
- Jon Whyte (1941–1992), poet, non-fiction writer
- Jeffery Williams (1920–2011), historian
- Deborah Willis (born 1982), novelist, short story writer
- Rita Wong (born 1968), poet

== Y ==
- Winnie Yeung (living), memoirist
- Alissa York (born 1970), novelist
- Blair Palmer Yoxall (living), novelist

== Z ==
- Bruce Zawalsky (born 1964), non-fiction writer
- Jan Zwicky (born 1955), philosopher, poet, essayist

== See also ==
- List of writers from Manitoba
- List of writers from Saskatchewan
- Lists of Canadian writers
