= Alberta Literary Awards =

Awards presented by the Writers' Guild of Alberta

The Alberta Literary Awards (ALA), administered by the Writers Guild of Alberta, have been awarded annually since 1982 to recognize outstanding writing by Alberta authors. The awards honour fiction, nonfiction, poetry, drama, and children's literature. At the first public ALA Gala in 1994, the inaugural Golden Pen Lifetime Achievement Award was given to W. O. Mitchell.

== Alberta Literary Awards ==
=== R. Ross Annett Award for Children’s Literature ===
The children’s literature category alternates yearly between picture and chapter books. The 2019 award is presented to an Alberta author of a children’s picture book published in 2017 or 2018.

=== Georges Bugnet Award for Fiction ===
Awarded for a novel or collection of short fiction by an Alberta author published in the previous year. Past recipients are W. P. Kinsella, Sam Selvon, Pauline Gedge, Aritha van Herk, Mary Walters Riskin, Helen Forrester, Jacqueline Dumas, Thomas King, Greg Hollingshead, Robert Hilles, Roberta Rees, Richard Wagamese, Marion Douglas, Kristjana Gunnars, Margie Taylor, Catherine Simmons Niven, Peter Oliva, Fred Stenson, Thomas Wharton, Thomas Trofimuk, Tim Bowling, Paul Anderson, Marie Jakober, Nina Newington, Jaspreet Singh, Michael Davie, Todd Babiak, Lynn Coady, Richard Van Camp, Ali Bryan, Rudy Wiebe, Bradley Somer, Gisèle Villeneuve, Deborah Willis, and Joshua Whitehead.

=== Wilfrid Eggleston Award for Nonfiction ===
Awarded for a nonfiction book by an Alberta author published in the previous year.

=== Gwen Pharis Ringwood Award for Drama ===
Awarded to a play written by an Alberta author published or produced in the previous year.

=== Stephan G. Stephansson Award for Poetry ===
Awarded for a collection of poetry by an Alberta author published in the previous year.

=== James H. Gray Award for Short Nonfiction ===
Awarded to an outstanding literary short nonfiction piece by an Alberta author on any topic published in the previous year.

=== Howard O’Hagan Award for Short Story ===
Awarded to an outstanding single short story by an Alberta author published in the previous year. Past recipients are Lareina Abbott, Cecelia Frey, Merna Summers, Diane Schoemperlen, W. O. Mitchell, J. Jill Robinson, Greg Hollingshead, Martin Sherman, Rosemary Nixon, Fred Wah, Sally Ito, Barbara Scott, Caterina Edwards, Gloria Sawai, Sarah Murphy, Jacqueline Baker, Thomas Wharton, Laura J. Cutler, Leslie Greentree, Roberta Rees, Barb Howard, Ben Lof, Rudy Wiebe, Amy Bright, Lee Kvern, Jasmina Odor, Katie Bickell, Richard Kelly Kemick, Laurie MacFayden and Norma Dunning.

=== Jon Whyte Memorial Essay Award ===
Named after the writer Jon Whyte, this award has been presented to an outstanding unpublished essay by an Alberta author since 1992.

== Book Prizes ==
=== Robert Kroetsch City of Edmonton Book Prize ===
The Robert Kroetsch City of Edmonton Book Prize was established by the City Council in 1995 and is administered by the Writers' Guild of Alberta. The prize was renamed in 2011 after the late Robert Kroetsch, who was best known for his Governor General's Award-winning novel, The Studhorse Man.

=== City of Calgary W. O. Mitchell Book Prize ===
Given out as part of the Calgary Awards, the City of Calgary W. O. Mitchell Book Prize is awarded in honour of acclaimed Calgary writer W. O. Mitchell and recognizes literary achievement by Calgary authors. The prize was established in 1996 and is coordinated through a partnership between The City of Calgary and the Writers' Guild of Alberta. Past recipients include: Lisa Chistensen, Elspeth Cameron, Richard Harrison, Barbara Scott, JoAnn McCaig, Andrew Nikiforuk, Paula da Costa, W. Mark Giles, Jan Lars Jensen, Christopher Wiseman, Rona Altrows, Diane Guichon, Gordon Pengilly, Clem Martini and Olivier Martini, Suzette Mayr, Marcello Di Cintio, Tyler Trafford, Chris Turner, Eugene Stickland, Joan Crate, and Taylor Lambert.

== Golden Pen Award ==
The Golden Pen Lifetime Achievement Award is presented to acknowledge the lifetime achievements of outstanding Alberta writers. The 2019 recipient was Bob Stallworthy. Vivian Hansen received this award in 2020 while Chris Wiseman was chosen in 2022. Past recipients are W. O. Mitchell, Grant MacEwan, Rudy Wiebe, Myrna Kostash, Robert Kroetsch, Merna Summers, Aritha van Herk, Fred Stenson (writer), George Melnyk, Alice Major, Betty Jane Hegerat, Greg Hollingshead, Candas Jane Dorsey and Cecelia Frey.

== The Kemosa Scholarship for First Nations, Métis and Inuit Mothers Who Write ==
Since 2018, the Writers Guild of Alberta has awarded three annual scholarships to support First Nations, Métis and Inuit Mothers in their writing careers. The Kemosa Scholarship winners for 2025 were: First Place : Lareina Abbott, Second Place: Alycia Two Bears, Third Place: Samantha Gibbon

== Past awards ==
- Alberta Screenwriters Initiative
- Amber Bowerman Memorial Travel Writing Award
- Henry Kreisel Award for Best First Book
- Sharon Drummond Chapbook Prize
- Youth/Emerging Writing Contest
