= Murdoch Burnett =

- Born: October 9, 1953; Calgary, Alberta
- Died: September 20, 2015 (aged 61); Courtenay, British Columbia
- Occupations: Poet, performance artist, editor, and community activist

Murdoch Maclean Burnett (9 October 1953 – 20 September 2015) was a Canadian poet, performance artist, editor, and community activist.

Born and raised in Calgary, Alberta, Murdoch Burnett was the seventh of eleven children born to Pat and Jim Burnett. He began writing poetry in the summer of 1971 at the age of seventeen. He left formal education behind at that point and embarked on what he has described as a journey of self-discovery and lifelong learning. He has taught and been a guest lecturer at the Alberta College of Art and Design, Mount Royal University and the University of Calgary.

In 1975, he met a local bookseller who would later become a book publisher, George Parry. Parry owned and operated a series of bookstores in Calgary including Laughing Rooster Books, Wild Turkey Books, and City Limits. Later he owned and operated a small publishing/distribution house, Westlands Book Express Ltd, which was eventually located in Cochrane, Alberta. Several of Burnett's books would be published by Westlands Book Express, but volumes were also published by Whickey Jack Publishing, Garlic Press, City Limits Communications, Penny Dreadfuls and BookThug.

== Influences ==
According to Burnett, his work was influenced by the founders of contemporary poetry – William Blake, Walt Whitman, and Charles Baudelaire – but also reflected his great respect for the early modernist pioneers Ezra Pound, Guillaume Apollinaire, William Carlos Williams, and Gertrude Stein. He always maintained that the single volume of poetry that most influenced his work was The Waste Land by T. S. Eliot and he was a great admirer of the poetry of Dylan Thomas and the Beat Generation poets, many of whom he met and worked with in their later years.

== Performance highlights ==
Burnett, performed his work at a number of popular venues in Calgary, including Ten Foot Henry's and Marty's Cafe. Over the years, Burnett would perform at various other venues and festivals both in and out of Alberta, including Vancouver, British Columbia, Winnipeg, Manitoba, Toronto, Ontario, and Seattle, Washington. In addition to writing poetry and performing, Murdoch Burnett hosted a radio show "Breaking the Silence" on commercial radio station 107 KIK FM (now CFGQ-FM) in Calgary from 1987 to 1989. It was a weekly half hour program dedicated to the art and craft of poetry and included interviews with other writers, recorded and live performances, and historical readings.

Burnett's research for his book, The Centre of the World: A Plains Journey was reviewed by Hugh Dempsey, noted Canadian historian, author, and Curator Emeritus of the Glenbow Museum, resulting in his book launch and first reading from that book being held at the museum. In addition to numerous regular readings and performances at various venues, he was also a headline performer at several "High Performance Rodeos" produced annually by the One Yellow Rabbit theatre company in Calgary.

In 1988, Burnett was invited to perform at the Calgary Olympic Arts Festival alongside writers from 27 different countries amongst whom were Lawrence Ferlinghetti and Ryszard Kapuscinski. A film of this event was produced and directed by Shona Rossell.

On November 25, 1989, Burnett performed at a "Poetry Caberet," presented by a performance group called Penny Dreadful based in Calgary. Other performers in the Cabaret were Suki Davis, Brian Rusted, Rick Therrien, Ken Rivard, Glen Sherret, and Yvonne Trainer. The well-attended caberet was held at the "Open Space" venue in Victoria, British Columbia.

In 1996, Murdoch Burnett was invited to participate in the first Wordfest: Banff Calgary International Writers Festival featuring 50 writers over four days. The 1996 line-up featured not only Burnett, but also Margaret Atwood, Roch Carrier, Wayson Choy, Tomson Highway, Paul Quarrington and Sheri-D Wilson.

A recording of one of Burnett's performances in Toronto, when he appeared as the closing act at the Scream in High Park - Scream '98, can be accessed at the Scream Literary Festival site. The Scream Literary Festival was an annual summer poetry reading event held under the stars in Toronto's High Park from 1993 to 2011. The Scream Festival no longer exists in that form, and in 2012 it was renamed "The Scream Unfestival."

For many years, Burnett worked with musician and composer Scott Willing and together they composed music for his performances of the poems: "We Are Not Romans," "Technologically Native", "Power and Glory," "A Choice of Futures," "The Long Distance," "The Homecoming," and "Centre of the World." Some of these performances were recorded on videotape and produced by The New Gallery and EMMEDIA.

== Awards and recognition ==
Burnett's contributions to the literary community in Canada were recognized at the Calgary International Spoken Word Festival "Home on Earth" in 2007 where he was honoured with the first ever Golden Beret Award. This award is given annually to a Canadian Poet who has made significant and lifelong contributions to the development of the poetic discipline through his or her written work, performances, and involvement in the community. The jury selected Mr. Burnett for the award based not only on these criteria but also the originality of his work, mastery of his art, and innovative techniques.

When interviewed by Fast Forward Weekly Magazine about the award, he humbly responded, "I hope people feel it is something that I would deserve." But added, "I hope it is not a lifetime achievement award – I still have so much more that I want to do. I was quite surprised and honoured by the award." Burnett went on to say that he felt Calgary's arts community had finally started to come into its own but expressed concern about the integrity of art making. Finally, when asked what he thought about all the new types of poets - punk-poets, club-poets, spoken-word artists and the like - Burnett said, "For a long time it was poet, before the hyphen. Over the years, there has been an explosion of club-poets, punk-poets, poetry slams, workshops, etc. That has been great – spoken word had been meant to be a more inclusive term," says Burnett. "But for myself, I am a poet first, performer second. I recognize that poetry can wear many hats. I just have never felt a need to hyphenate myself."

Burnett's work was also recognized and commented on in The Literary History of Alberta: From the End of the War to the End of the Century, Vol 2, wherein author, George Melnyk, wrote:

Murdoch Burnett (born 1953) grew up in Southern Alberta and describes himself in his first volume as an "alienated man". For most of his career, Burnett published with George Parry, a Calgary (and later Cochrane) bookseller and occasional publisher whose Westlands imprint released Burnett's books 'We Are Not Romans' (1984) and 'The Long Distance and Other Poems' (1987). A highly visible member of the Calgary poetry scene for several decades, Burnett drew on his Calgary and Southern Alberta experience to help him locate his poetry. In 'The Centre of the World: A Plains Journey' (1993) Burnett explores the history and environment of the Southern prairies.

In collaboration with Penny Dreadful, a poetry performance group, Burnett's poem "Welcome to the Real World" was included in a four book set of poetry, entitled Poetry, published by Russell Books in Victoria, B.C. At the Books in Canada Website, Ken McGoogan, book reviewer at that time for the Calgary Herald Newspaper, reviews the state of literature in Alberta for their Jan/Feb 1992 issue and posits that there a number of excellent writers in Alberta. With respect to poetry, he wrote:

In poetry, besides Connelly, Calgary is home to Fred Wah, Christopher Wiseman, Robert Hilles, Andrew Wreggitt, Murdoch Burnett and, until recently, Claire Harris and Nancy Holmes. A short drive away, there's Jon Whyte (Banff), Monty Reid (Drumheller), and Richard Stevenson (Lethbridge).

Three of his poems - "Imitating Art," "No Music," and "Watts Towers" - were selected and included in The Last Word: An Insomniac Anthology of Contemporary Canadian Poetry edited by Michael William Holmes.

In his collection of Alberta poetry, Writing the Terrain: Travelling through Alberta with the Poets, the editor, Robert M. Stamp included one of Burnett's poems, "Boys or the River."

"The Centre of the World: A Plains Journey" was chosen by Dr. Alwynne B. Beaudoin (Royal Alberta Museum) for inclusion in her recommended bibliography of important written and photographical accounts of the human history of the Palliser Triangle, the southern Canadian prairies.

== Contributions to other writers ==
From the late 1970s through the 1980s, Murdoch Burnett was instrumental in bringing other local, national and international writers to various Calgary stages including William S. Burroughs, Allen Ginsberg, Anne Waldman, and Anne Michaels.

Around that same time, Burnett became a founding member of the Penny Dreadfuls, a writing collective in Calgary whose mandate was to identify accomplished but unpublished writers in Calgary and to produce live performance, video, and small press publications of their work.

In addition to writing and performing, Burnett was also the Poetry editor for Release Magazine and Last Issue Magazine during the late 1970s and early 1980s.

In the book "Moving History / Dancing Cultures: A Dance History Reader" edited by Ann Dils and Ann Cooper Albright, in the Notes accompanying a chapter contributed by Lisa Doolittle and Heather Elton, entitled "Medicine of the Brave: A Look at the Changing Role of Dance in Native Culture from Buffalo Days to the Modern Powwow" the authors thank Murdoch Burnett for his assistance.

Murdoch Burnett has donated a number of his personal writings, photographs, manuscripts, drawings and other documents to the Murdoch Burnett Fonds which are maintained as part of the Special Collections, Literary and Art Archives, of the University of Calgary. Researchers, historians, other writers, students, and interested readers will, therefore, always have access to these materials.

== Social activism ==
Over the years in Calgary, Murdoch Burnett was actively concerned about community and social issues. From 1981 to 1982 he was the Editor of City Limits - A Community Newspaper. City Limits began as a community newspaper but quickly came to serve as an alternative voice in Calgary. The paper dealt with local community, cultural, and international issues, offering alternative perspectives on women's issues, labour, culture, the third world, and local and international politics.

In Volume 1 of the paper (August 1981) for example Burnett edited a taped conversation with a group of El Salvadorean folk musicians known as Yolocamba Ita. The goal of the piece (which was also released as a stand-alone publication by Syntax Arts Society in Calgary) was, according to Burnett, to express solidarity with the El Salvadorean cultural workers and to counteract some of the biased reporting they had been subjected to by other mainstream North American press.

Burnett was also instrumental in helping to promote a local artists' centre, and bring together artists from diverse backgrounds and mediums to run the centre cooperatively. This collective was known as Off Centre Centre and would undergo many metamorpheses in subsequent years, eventually becoming The New Gallery. From 1980 to 1987, Off Centre Centre focused on community collaborations and worked with organizations such as ANNPAC (Association of National Non-Profit Artist Centres) and One Yellow Rabbit (theatre company) to advance artist's rights and artistic practices in Calgary and Canada.

== Later years ==
Murdoch Burnett moved to Comox, British Columbia, in 1998, where he continued to write. In 2009, he moved back to his beloved Alberta Prairies. He was married in 2010, lived in Bermuda with his wife where he spent his time editing the poems he wrote while living in British Columbia and writing new poems. Murdoch died suddenly on September 20, 2015, in Courtenay, British Columbia.

== Selected bibliography ==
=== Books ===
- Experiments in a Pure Form: Poems, 1971–1980 (1981), Calgary: City Limits Communications
- We Are Not Romans (1984), Calgary: Westlands
- The Long Distance and Other Poems, 1981–1986 (1987), Cochrane: Westlands
- Welcome to the Real World (1987), Calgary, Penny Dreadfuls
- The Centre of the World: A Plains Journey (1993), Calgary: Whiskey Jack Press
- River Deep, Mountain High (1996), Toronto: Garlic Press
- The Ides Manifesto (1998), Calgary: Penny Dreadfuls
- Four Poems (1998), Toronto: BookThug

=== Anthologies ===
- The Last Word: An Insomniac Anthology of Contemporary Canadian Poetry, Edited by Michael William Holmes, (1995), Toronto: Insomniac Press
- Writing the Terrain: Travelling through Alberta with the Poets, Edited by Robert M. Stamp, (1995), Calgary: University of Calgary Press
- Poetry, edited by Brian Rusted, (1987), Victoria, B.C.: Russell Books

=== Discussed/Cited ===
- The Literary History of Alberta: From the End of the War to the End of the Century, George Melnyk, (1999), Edmonton: University of Alberta Press
- Cross-Country Check-up, Part 1, Kenneth McGoogan (Jan/Feb 1992) Toronto: Books in Canada - The Canadian Review of Books
- Reading the Palliser Triangle, Allwyne Beaudoin, Royal Alberta Museum - Head Curator of Landscape Studies, (1998–2012) Edmonton
