= Thomas Wharton (author) =

Canadian novelist

- Born: February 25, 1963 (age 63); Grande Prairie, Alberta, Canada
- Education: University of Alberta; University of Calgary
- Occupations: Novelist; Professor
- Writing career
- Period: 1995–present
- Notable works: Icefields; Salamander; The Logogryph; The Book of Rain
- Notable awards: Banff Mountain Book Festival Grand Prize (1995); Commonwealth Writers Prize for Best First Book, Canada and Caribbean region (1996); Henry Kreisel Award for Best First Book (1996); Georges Bugnet Award for Fiction (2002)
- Website: Official website

Thomas Wharton (born February 25, 1963) is a Canadian writer from Edmonton, Alberta.

== Life ==
Born in Grande Prairie, Wharton later spent part of his teen years living in Jasper. He attended the University of Alberta and the University of Calgary, where he was a student of Rudy Wiebe and Greg Hollingshead. His first novel began as his M.A. thesis, under the supervision of Kristjana Gunnars. He worked on his PhD at Calgary with Aritha van Herk.

Wharton is currently a professor of creative writing and English at the University of Alberta.

== Career ==
Wharton's first novel, Icefields, was published in 1995. It was selected for inclusion in the 2008 Canada Reads competition, where it was advocated by astronaut Steve MacLean.

His second book, Salamander, was published in 2001. His third book, The Logogryph, was published in 2004.

Wharton subsequently published a three-volume fantasy novel for younger readers, The Perilous Realm. The three books in the series are The Shadow of Malabron (2008), The Fathomless Fire (2012), and The Tree of Story (2013).

Wharton's 2014 novel Every Blade of Grass was the story of a decades-long correspondence between a man and woman who share a love for the wonders and oddities of nature.

== Awards and honours ==
=== Icefields ===
- 1995 – Won the Banff Mountain Book Festival Grand Prize.
- 1996 – Won the Commonwealth Writers Prize for Best First Book in the Canada and Caribbean region.
- 1996 – Won the Writers Guild of Alberta's Henry Kreisel Award for Best First Book.

=== Salamander ===
- 2001 – Shortlisted for the Governor General's Award for English-language fiction.
- 2002 – Shortlisted for the Rogers Writers' Trust Fiction Prize.
- 2002 – Won the Georges Bugnet Award for Fiction and was a finalist for the Grant MacEwan Author's Award at the Writers Guild of Alberta awards.

=== The Logogryph ===
- 2006 – Shortlisted for the International Dublin Literary Award.

=== The Book of Rain ===
- 2023 – Shortlisted for the Atwood Gibson Writers' Trust Fiction Prize.

== Bibliography ==
- Icefields - 1995 ISBN 0920897878
- Salamander - 2001 ISBN 0-7434-4415-9
- The Logogryph: A Bibliography of Imaginary Books - 2004 ISBN 1-894031-93-8
- The Shadow of Malabron: Book One of The Perilous Realm - 2008
- The Fathomless Fire: Book Two of The Perilous Realm - 2012
- The Tree of Story: Book Three of the Perilous Realm - 2013
- Every Blade of Grass - 2014
- The Book of Rain - 2023
- "Wolf, Moon, Dog" - 2026
