= Roberta Rees =

Canadian writer from Alberta (born 1954)

- Born: Roberta Rees; 1954 (age 71–72)
- Occupations: Writer, Poet

Roberta Rees (born 1954 in New Westminster, British Columbia) is a Canadian writer from Alberta.

== Career ==
Rees was raised primarily in Crowsnest Pass, Alberta, and has been based in Calgary, Alberta since moving there at age 19 to attend the University of Calgary. She has also taught English and creative writing at the high school and university levels.

To date, she is most noted for her short story collection Long After Fathers, which won the ReLit Award for short fiction, and was a finalist for the Danuta Gleed Literary Award, in 2008.

== Awards ==
In 1993, she won the Gerald Lampert Award and the Alberta Literary Awards' Stephan G. Stephansson prize for poetry for her poetry collection Eyes Like Pigeons, and her novel Beneath the Faceless Mountain won the Alberta New Fiction Competition for unpublished manuscripts in 1993. Following the publication of Beneath the Faceless Mountain in 1994, the book was co-winner, with Richard Wagamese's Keeper 'n Me, of the Georges Bugnet Award for Novel at the 1995 Writers' Guild of Alberta's Alberta Literary Awards. Her collection of short fiction Long After Fathers won the Howard O'Hagan Award at the Alberta Literary Awards in 2008.

Rees has twice won the James H. Gray Award for short nonfiction, an Alberta Literary Award, in 2018 for "Evie's Massage Parlour" (Writing Menopause, Inanna Publications and Education Inc., 2017) and again in 2019 for "Bones, Honey" (Waiting: An Anthology of Essays, The University of Alberta Press, 2018).

== Bibliography ==
=== Poetry ===
- Eyes Like Pigeons (Brick Books, 1992)

=== Fiction ===
- Beneath the Faceless Mountain (Red Deer Press, 1995)
- Long After Fathers (Coteau Books, 2009)
