= Cecelia Frey =

Canadian poet and writer

- Occupations: Novelist, Poet, Writer
- Website: ceceliafrey.wordpress.com

Cecelia Frey (born 1936) is a Canadian poet, novelist, and short story writer. Her works have appeared in literary magazines and in numerous anthologies, and broadcast on CBC Radio as well as produced by the Women's Television Network. She was the 2018 recipient of the Golden Pen Lifetime Achievement Award.

== Biography ==
Cecelia Frey was born in 1936 on a homestead near Padstow south of Mayorthorpe, Alberta, and moved to Edmonton where she worked as a social worker and librarian. In 1970, she launched her writing career by attending the University of Calgary where she took a writing course with W.O. Mitchell. She has since worked as a freelance writer, editor and teacher. An organizer and producer of the Calgary Creative Reading Series, she served as fiction editor of Dandelion Magazine from 1983-1988.

Frey lives in Calgary, Alberta.

== Bibliography ==
=== Fiction ===
- Lovers Fall Back To Earth (Inanna Publications, 2018)
- Moments of Joy (Inanna Publications, 2015)
- The Long White Sickness (Inanna Publications, 2013)
- A Raw Mix of Carelessness and Longing (Brindle & Glass, 2009)
- A Fine Mischief (Touchwood Press, 2004)
- The Prisoner of Cage Farm (University of Calgary Press, 2003)
- Breakaway (Macmillan Publishers, 1974)

=== Short fiction ===
- Salamander Moon (Snowapple Press, 1997)
- The Love Song of Romeo Paquette (Thistledown Press, 1990)
- The Nefertiti Look (Thistledown Press, 1987)

=== Poetry ===
- North (Bayeux Arts, 2017)
- Under Nose Hill (Bayeux Arts, 2009)
- reckless women (Ronsdale Press, 2004)
- And Still I hear Her Singing (Touchwood Editions, 2000)
- Songs Like White Apples Tasted (Bayeux Arts, 1998)
- the least you can do is sing (Longspoon Press, 1982)

=== Drama ===
- The Dinosaur Connection (CBC, Vanishing Point Series, 1988)

=== Nonfiction ===
- Phyllis Webb: An Annotated Bibliography, The Annotated Bibliography of Canada’s Major Authors Series (ECW Press, 1985)

== Awards and honours ==
Her novel, A Raw Mix of Carelessness and Longing, was shortlisted for the 2009 Writer's Guild of Alberta George Bugnet Fiction Award and she is a three-time recipient of the WGA Short Fiction Award. Her novel, Lovers Fall Back to Earth, was a finalist for the 2019 International Book Awards (Fiction-Literary). She has also won awards for play writing.
