= Janice MacDonald =

Canadian writer

Janice Elva MacDonald is a Canadian writer of literary and mystery novels, textbooks, non-fiction, and stories for both adults and children. She is best known as the creator of a series of comic academic mystery novels featuring reluctant amateur sleuth Miranda "Randy" Craig, the first mystery series set in Edmonton, Alberta. Her latest series, the Imogene Durant Mysteries, follows an intrepid retired professor in her quest to read classics in the places they were set, and survive doing so.

== Biography ==
Janice MacDonald was born in Canada's Banff National Park in 1959 but has spent most of her life in Edmonton, Alberta.

MacDonald wrote her Master's thesis on detective fiction, appeared as an on-air mystery expert for the Canadian television series "Booked" and was, for many years, the regular crime fiction reviewer for the Edmonton Journal.

== Career ==
She is a former lecturer in English literature and Communications at both the University of Alberta and Grant MacEwan College, and she has taught courses on writing and detective fiction at national and international conferences. She then spent nearly two decades editing and writing for the Government of Alberta in various ministries.

MacDonald's earlier, non-mystery works include award-winning non-fiction and children's titles. The best-known of these is a well-received chapter book for young readers, The Ghouls' Night Out.

MacDonald continued to expand her oeuvre beyond crime fiction in 2015–2017, contributing a literary short story to Avenue Magazine, another short story to AB Negative: An Anthology of Alberta Crime, and a piece of creative non-fiction to 40 Below Volume 2: Alberta's Winter Anthology. In April 2017, MacDonald released her first full-length book of non-fiction in 18 years, Confederation Drive. The book follows the author on a road trip across Canada to mark the 50-year anniversary of a similar trip she took with her late mother to attend Expo '67 in Montreal, as well as to mark Canada's 2017 sesquicentennial year. The book became the #1 non-fiction title in Edmonton in its first week of release, making it MacDonald's fifth consecutive chart-topping book.

While pursuing her own writing career, MacDonald has also served in a variety of leadership and mentorship roles for other writers from Alberta and across Canada. She was a member of the executive board for the Writers’ Guild of Alberta (WGA) from 1989 to 1990 and President of the WordWorks Society of Alberta from 1996 to 1997. MacDonald's longtime service with the Canadian Authors Association (CAA) at the provincial and national levels included a stint as President of the Alberta Branch from 1993 to 1996, during which time she co-chaired two national conferences and created/developed the Exporting Alberta Award, which is still awarded annually. At the national level, MacDonald served as the CAA's National Vice President for Awards from 1995 to 1997 and as the CAA Fiction Award Manager from 1995 to 2005. She continues to mentor writers by teaching at workshops, conferences, Blue Pencil events with the WGA, and writing camps such as YouthWrite and its spin-off for adults, JustWrite.

=== Randy Craig Mysteries ===
The Randy Craig Mysteries put a spin on the "ivory tower" academic mysteries by presenting a lead character who cannot seem to land a tenure-track position. Instead, she changes jobs on the periphery of academe in each new adventure, managing to find trouble (and a body or two) wherever she goes. The novels have been celebrated for their use of the city of Edmonton as a "star character." Because each of the novels delves into a different aspect of university and cultural life, the series is frequently discussed in academic journals such as The Chronicle of Higher Education and The Journal of the Canadian Society for Traditional Music.

The latest of these, The Eye of the Beholder: A Randy Craig Mystery, released in October 2018 and a local #1 Bestseller, sees Randy and her long-time boyfriend Steve Browning finally tying the knot, only to become entangled in a mystery tied to the Edmonton visual arts scene while on their honeymoon in Puerto Vallarta, Mexico. Another Margaret: A Randy Craig Mystery, released in September 2015, followed Miranda to a reunion of her fellow graduate school students and resurrects a mystery involving a Canadian literary figure who has been long-believed dead; the novel incorporates all events from the long out-of-print 1994 book The Next Margaret as part of a much-expanded story. The Roar of the Crowd: A Randy Craig Mystery was released on July 10, 2014, with a plot involving the Edmonton theatre scene, including the Freewill Shakespeare Festival and the Edmonton International Fringe Theatre Festival, and it went on to be nominated for the David Award for Best Mystery Novel at the 2015 Deadly Ink Conference and featured as a recommended read in both the 2015 Edmonton Travel Guide and the 2015 Avenue Magazine Summer Reading Guide. Condemned to Repeat: A Randy Craig Mystery, was published on June 15, 2013, and involves a series of deadly events connected to Alberta historic sites, including Rutherford House, Fort Edmonton Park, and the Ukrainian Cultural Heritage Village; it debuted in the top spot on the Edmonton Journal's bestseller list on June 21, 2013, and went on to be shortlisted for the Mary Scorer Award for Best Book by a Manitoba Publisher at the 2013 Manitoba Book Awards as well as the David Award for Best Mystery Novel at the 2014 Deadly Ink Conference. Hang Down Your Head: A Randy Craig Mystery, was published in November 2011 and features "cameo" appearances by several real-life folk musicians, as well as a corpse discovered at the Edmonton Folk Music Festival. The book was a hit in MacDonald's home city and spent more than six months on the Edmonton Journal's Top 10 list. The book and its author were profiled on CBC Radio, CityTV's Breakfast Television show, in the Edmonton Journal, and in the Edmonton Examiner. A January 2012 cover story in Edmonton Woman Magazine and a half-hour interview on the CKUA Radio Network's ArtBeat program, looked more extensively at the entire mystery series.

=== Imogene Durant Mysteries ===
MacDonald's new mystery series turns the set up of her earlier series on its ear: instead of having a book-loving academic manque help solve murders in her home town of Edmonton, it takes a retired Edmonton Comparative Literature professor and sends her to wonderful places around the globe, reading classic works in situ. Her take on it is that such a reading requires the same sort of focus as reading in translation. Victor & Me in Paris (2024) is her first adventure, with Wexford Carole (set in the sunny southeast of Ireland) and My Heart Belongs to Dante (2026) revolving around nefarious affairs in Florence, Italy. All three titles debuted as #1 on the Edmonton bestsellers list, with Victor & Me earning the #1 spot in Alberta the week it launched.

== Bibliography ==
=== Novels ===
- My Heart Belongs to Dante: An Imogene Durant Mystery (2026) Ravenstone Books/ Turnstone Press
- Wexford Carole: An Imogene Durant Mystery (2025) Ravenstone Books/Turnstone Press
- Victor & Me in Paris: An Imogene Durant Mystery (2024) Ravenstone Books/Turnstone Press
- The Eye of the Beholder: A Randy Craig Mystery (2018) Ravenstone Books/Turnstone Press
- Another Margaret: A Randy Craig Mystery (2015) Ravenstone Books/Turnstone Press
- The Roar of the Crowd: A Randy Craig Mystery (2014) Ravenstone Books/Turnstone Press
- Condemned to Repeat: A Randy Craig Mystery (2013) Ravenstone Books/Turnstone Press
- Hang Down Your Head: A Randy Craig Mystery (2011) Ravenstone Books/Turnstone Press
- The Monitor: A Randy Craig Mystery (2003) Ravenstone Books/Turnstone Press
- Sticks and Stones: A Randy Craig Mystery (2001) Ravenstone Books/Turnstone Press
- The Next Margaret (1994) Mosaic Press

=== Children's book ===
- The Ghouls' Night Out (1998) Ronsdale Press

=== Non-fiction ===
- Confederation Drive (2017) Monto Books/Wufniks Press
- True North: Canadian Essays for Composition (1999) Addison-Wesley
- Canoeing Alberta (1985) Lone Pine Publishing
- The Northwest Fort (1983) Lone Pine Publishing

=== Featured work in magazines ===
- "Double Oh" (short story) Edify Magazine, October 2021
- "The Window Seat" (short story) in Avenue Edmonton, July 2015
- "#YEG: Sole to Soul" (essay) in Avenue Edmonton, July 2013

=== Featured work in anthologies ===
- "The Cold War" in 40 Below Volume 2: Alberta's Winter Anthology (2015), ed. Jason Lee Norman, Wufniks Press
- "The Workman's Friend" in AB Negative: An Anthology of Alberta Crime (2015), ed. Axel Howerton, Coffin Hop Press
- "Getting Away with Murder" in Forms of Writing (2009), eds. Kay L. Stewart, Marian Allen & Shelley Galliah, Pearson-Prentice Hall
- "Call Him Ishmael" in When Boomers Go Bad (2005), The Ladies Killing Circle, Ottawa
- "Edmonton" in Formac Guide Alberta and the Rockies, Ken McGoogan, Brian Brennan & Terry Inigo-Jones, Lorimar, Toronto, four editions: 2001, 2006, 2008, 2010
- "When? Why? What? Where? Answers to Questions Inevitably Asked" in The Spirit of Writing: Classic and Contemporary Essays Celebrating the Writing Life (2001), ed. Mark Waldman, Tarcher/Putnam
- "Starting Over" in Wrestling with the Angel (2000), eds. Caterina Edwards & Kay Stewart, Red Deer Press
- "Parody and Detective Fiction" in Theory and Practice of Classic Detective Fiction (1997), eds. Jerome H. Delamater & Ruth Prigozy, Greenwood Publishing
