= Pauline Gedge =

Canadian novelist (born 1945)

Pauline Gedge (born December 11, 1945) is a Canadian novelist best known for her historical fiction novels, including the best-selling Child of the Morning, The Eagle and the Raven, her fantasy novel Stargate, and her Egyptian trilogies, Lords of the Two Lands and The King's Man. She also writes science fiction, fantasy and horror. Her 13 novels have sold more than six million copies in 18 languages.

Her first four novels were published with cover art by Leo and Diane Dillon. The Dillons almost never authorized their work for sale beyond that directly commissioned, but reproductions of their covers of Gedge's novels were made available for sale via an agreement between Gedge and Diane Dillon, who met in the late 1970s.

== Personal life ==
Pauline Gedge was born December 11, 1945, in Auckland, New Zealand. In 1951, the family relocated to England so her father could study for the Anglican ministry. In 1956, Gedge attended the Oxford Central School for Girls, studying chemistry, violin, piano, and recorders. In 1959, her father accepted a parish in Manitoba, and the family relocated again, this time to Canada. Gedge attended a local high school and then a boarding school while there, saying her time at the boarding school was "the most dehumanizing, miserable experience".

In 1961, Gedge began her studies at University of Manitoba Brandon College, but did not end up graduating. The family returned to New Zealand so Gedge's sister, who was ill, could die in the country of her birth. Gedge's father ended up accepting a parish in New Zealand and the family stayed. Gedge worked as a substitute teacher in three rural schools for a year, and in 1964 began to attend the Teacher's Training College in Dunedin, New Zealand. She did not return to the school for a second year.

In 1966, Gedge was married and moved to Alberta, Canada with her husband. Her first son was born in 1968, and her second son was born in 1970. She was married again in the 1980s. She continued moving about Canada and writing books. She and her second husband divorced some time later, and Gedge now lives in Edgerton, Alberta, Canada.

== Career ==
Gedge wrote unpublished poetry for years. She tried to write contemporary mainstream fiction in the early 1970s and then gave up, turning to ancient Egypt for inspiration. She based her first published novel, Child of the Morning, on the historical figure of Hatshepsut, one of Egypt's few female pharaohs. She wrote the novel in six weeks and went on to win the Alberta Search-for-a-New Novelist Competition in 1975.

The Eagle and the Raven received the Jean Boujassy award from the Société des Gens de Lettres in France and The Twelfth Transforming won the Writers Guild of Alberta Best Novel of the Year Award.

She has also written in other genres. Stargate is science fiction, The Covenant is contemporary horror fiction, and Scroll of Saqqara is a horror story which incorporates some fantasy elements.

Gedge's ex-husband, Bernie Ramanauskas, helped to provide the historical research for many of her later novels.

== Prizes and honours ==
- 1977 Alberta Search-for-a-New Novelist Competition
- 1978 Jean Boujassy award from the Société des Gens des Lettres
- 1985 Writers' Guild of Alberta's Georges Bugnet Award for Novel

== Bibliography ==
=== Novels ===
- Child of the Morning (1977)
- The Eagle and the Raven (1978)
- Stargate (1982)
- The Twelfth Transforming (1984)
- Scroll of Saqqara (1990) (published under the title Mirage in the U.S.)
- The Covenant (1992)
- House of Dreams (1994) (a.k.a. Lady of the Reeds)
- House of Illusions (1996)
- Lords of the Two Lands trilogy:
  - The Hippopotamus Marsh: Lords of the Two Lands, Volume One (1998)
  - The Oasis: Lords of the Two Lands, Volume Two (1999)
  - The Horus Road: Lords of the Two Lands, Volume Three (2000)
- The King's Man trilogy:
  - The Twice Born (2007)
  - Seer of Egypt (2008)
  - The King's Man (2011)
