= Caterina Edwards =

Canadian writer and teacher

- Born: 1948 (age 77–78); Earls Barton, England
- Occupations: Writer & Teacher
- Partner: Marco LoVerso
- Website: www.caterinaedwards.com

Caterina Edwards LoVerso (born 1948) is a Canadian writer and teacher. Edwards was born in Earls Barton, England. Her mother was born in Lussino, Istria, and her father is from a Welsh and English family. Edwards eventually moved to Calgary and later attended the University of Alberta in Edmonton where she earned a B.A. in English. She then went on to complete a Master of Arts in Creative Writing. After attending the University of Alberta, Caterina Edwards married an American student of Sicilian origin, and they later settled in Edmonton to start a family. Shortly after this time, Edwards' published short stories in literary journals, and anthologies, which has continued to this day.

== Life and career ==
Edwards was the first Italian-Canadian woman writer in western Canada. In 1982 The Lion's Mouth was the first Canadian novel to combine ethnicity with feminism. In 1986, Terra Straniera was the first play about Italian immigrants in the Canadian Prairies. This play was later published as Homeground (1990), which was Edward's second book. Much like some of her characters, Edwards is a woman writer, who isolated on the Canadian Prairies, had the freedom to experiment with different genres in short stories, novellas, novels, a play and essays.

For many years Caterina Edwards has taught English and creative writing at institutions in Edmonton such as Grant MacEwan Community College, the University of Alberta and Athabasca University. During her 7 years at Athabasca she created two courses one on writing short fiction and a second on novel writing. She combines two of her major interests into her teaching, which include, her own writing and encouraging other writers. The conflicts that relate to Edwards' life are similar to the conflicts reflected in the characters of her books.

== Finding Rosa (2008) ==
When Edwards was asked about the inspiration of her latest book, Finding Rosa she replied,

"I wanted to make sense of my relationship with my mother. This required discovering her past. That led me to search for the history of the place where she was born. I felt the connection between the personal and the public, between memory and history, before I understood it."

In an interview in 2008, Edwards states "that the biggest challenge for writing Finding Rosa', was to find a proper structure." Throughout her years of writing she claims that writer-friends have criticized her for having "no narrative through line" in her writings. She goes on to explain that it had taken a few years for her to figure out how to interweave the story of her mother with life story and history. In 2020 this novel was published in Italian as Riscoprendo mia Madre to great critical success.

== Critical commentary ==
Edwards has a sense of regionalism towards the Canadian Prairies in her novels but she tries not to limit her appeal to the rest of Canada. Some critics say that Edwards writes in the realist tradition, like some other regional authors. In 2000 Joseph Pivato edited, Caterina Edwards: Essays on Her Works (Guernica Editions). Edwards' writing has been the subject of graduate theses and literary articles in international journals and books.

== Books ==
- The Sicilian Wife - 2015
- Finding Rosa – 2008
- Island of Nightingale – 2000
- Homeground: A Play - 1990
- The Lion's Mouth – 1983
- Whiter Shade of Pale/ Becoming Emma - 1992
- Riscoprendo mia madre: Una figlia alla ricerca del passato - 2020
- Wrestling with the Angel: Women Reclaiming their Lives co-edited with K. Stewart - 2000

== Prizes and honours ==
- Inducted into the Salute to Excellence Hall of Fame in Edmonton (June, 2016)
- Nominated for the 2009 Writers' Guild of Alberta's City of Edmonton Book Prize
- Winner of the 2009 Wilfred Eggleston Award for Nonfiction
- Fellowship at Literary Journalism Program at Banff Centre for the Arts, 2003
- Jon Whyte Memorial Essay Prize for What Remains, 2002
- Howard O'Hagan Award for Short Fiction for Island of the Nightingales, 2001
- Nominated for the Gwen Pharis Ringwood Award for Drama for Homeground, 1991
