= Bruce Hunter (poet) =

Canadian poet, fiction and non-fiction author

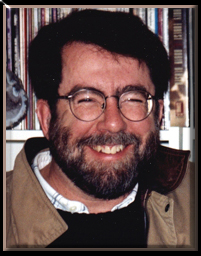
- Bruce Hunter, 1998
- Born: 1952 (age 73–74); Calgary, Alberta, Canada
- Education: Banff School of Fine Arts; York University
- Occupation: Author
- Writing career
- Period: 1981–present
- Notable works: Two O'clock Creek – Poems New and Selected In the Bear's House Coming Home From Home Country Music Country
- Notable awards: Acorn-Livesay-Plantos Peoples' Poetry Medal, 2011; Canadian Rockies Award, 2009
- Website: brucehunter.ca

Bruce Hunter (born 1952) is a Canadian poet, fiction and non-fiction author.

== Biography ==
Bruce Hunter was born in Calgary, Alberta. He is the author of ten books, seven of them poetry, as well as a collection of linked short stories and a novel. In 2010, his seventh book, Two O'Clock Creek - Poems New and Selected won the Acorn-Plantos Peoples' Poetry Award.

In 2009, Bruce's novel, In the Bear's House, won the Canadian Rockies prize selected from over 100 books from 10 countries at the Banff Mountain Book Festival.

His poetry collection Coming Home From Home (2000), was short-listed for the 1997 CBC/Saturday Night literary competition and selected as one of the top ten People's Choice poetry books of 2000. His linked story collection, Country Music Country, was published in 1996 to critical acclaim and broadcast on CBC Radio's Between the Covers. Wayson Choy said in Saturday Night: "Bruce Hunter writes with bold restraint and a poet's sensibility. His blue collar characters walk the tight line of their lives into the common universe that includes us all."

In 2017, Bruce was Author in Residence at Calgary Public Library and in 2007, he was Writer in Residence at the Richmond Hill Public Library, in the Greater Toronto Region; in 2002, he was Writer in Residence at the Banff Centre for the Writers' Guild of Alberta.

Bruce was deafened as an infant and was affected by low vision most of his adult life. He worked for 15 years as a gardener, labourer, equipment operator, and Zamboni driver before returning to school in his late twenties. While working those jobs, his poetry won him a scholarship to study creative writing at the Banff School of Fine Arts with W.O. Mitchell. Bruce went on to study film and literature at York University, graduating with a Bachelor of Fine Arts (Honours).

From 1986 to 2012, Bruce taught English and Liberal Studies at Seneca College. In the 1980s, for four years he was poetry and poetry reviews editor and columnist for Toronto-based Cross Canada Writers' Quarterly. He has also taught creative writing at the Banff Centre and York University.

Bruce retired from teaching in 2012, and writes full-time in addition to hosting readings and workshops on creativity and disability. He is a long-time member of the Canadian Hearing Society, the Canadian Hard of Hearing Association, the Canadian National Institute for the Blind, the League of Canadian Poets, the Writers' Guild of Alberta, the Writers' Union of Canada, and the Sierra Club of Canada.

== Publications ==
=== Books ===
- Galestro - English/Italian trans. by Sirotti, Andrea (ISBN 979-8-3732-6842-4)
- A Life in Poetry - English/ Italian trans. by D’Ambra, Angela (ISBN 979-8-3762-5660-2)
- Country Music Country - The Reboot, short story collection, 2019 (with an introduction by Shaun Hunter and a Postscript to the new and third edition by the author), (ISBN 978-1-927950-20-3 print, ISBN 978-1-927950-19-7 ePub)
- Two O'Clock Creek, poems new and selected, 2010 (ISBN 978-0-88982-266-5)
- In The Bear's House, novel, 2009 (ISBN 978-088982-253-5)
- Coming Home From Home, poetry, 2000 (ISBN 1-894345-11-8)
- Country Music Country, short story collection, 1996 (ISBN 1-895449-58-8)
- The Beekeeper's Daughter, poetry, 1986 (ISBN 0-920633-15-3)
- Benchmark, poetry, 1982 (ISBN 978-0-920066-48-5)
- Selected Canadian Rifles, poetry, 1981 (ISBN 0-920976-07-7)

=== Anthologies ===
- Sweet Water - Poems to the Watersheds - 2020
- Portraits of Canadian Writers - 2017
- Enchantments of Place - 2017
- Deaf Poets Society - 2016
- World Poetry, English/Mandarin - 2014
- El Ghibli, Italian/English - 2014
- A Heart of Wisdom – Life Writing as Empathetic Inquiry - 2012
- Coastal Moments Writing Journal - 2011
- Stories About Us - 2005
- Writing the Terrain - 2005
- Honouring Mothers - 2004
- Smaller than God: Poems of the Spiritual - 2001
- 2000% Cracked Wheat - 2000
- Following the Plough: Recovering the Rural - 2000
- Line By Line - 1999
- A Rich Garland: Poems for A.M. Klein - 1999
- The Summit Anthology - 1999
- 90 Poets of the Nineties: An Anthology of American and Canadian Poetry - 1998
- In the Clear - 1998
- Reading Writing - 1996
- What Is Already Known - 1995
- Paperwork: New Work Poetry - 1990
- Your Voice and Mine - 1987
- No Feather, No Ink: Louis Riel Poems - 1985
- Dancing Visions: New Poets in Review - 1985
- Glass Canyons - 1984
- New Voices: A Celebration of Canadian Poetry - 1984
- Going For Coffee: Work Poetry - 1981

== See also ==
- List of Canadian poets
