= Calgary Awards =

Meant to celebrate contributions done to the community by Calgarians

== The Awards ==
The Calgary Awards is an award given out annually by the Canadian city of Calgary. It is managed by the official citizen recognition program of Calgary and was established in 1994. It is meant to celebrate contributions done to the community by Calgarians. There are several categories, ranging from "Citizen of the Year", "The Award for Accessibility", "The Community Achievement Awards", "The Environmental Achievement Award", "The Signature Award" and the "W.O. Mitchell Book Prize". Recipients are honored at a ceremony attended by the Mayor of Calgary and members of the City Council which is televised.

== Selection Process ==
The Calgary Awards nomination process is administered by The City of Calgary through the City Clerk’s Office. Nominations are submitted annually and reviewed to ensure eligibility requirements are met. Award recipients are selected by independent juries based on the information provided in nomination packages.

Different award categories are reviewed by separate juries composed of City representatives, community members, subject matter experts, and previous award recipients. Jury composition varies depending on the award category.

Following the jury review process, the recommended recipients are submitted to Calgary City Council for approval. Recipients and nominators are then notified by The City of Calgary prior to the public announcement of award recipients.

== Governance and Administration ==
The Calgary Awards program is administered by The City of Calgary through the City Clerk’s Office. Program administration includes the annual nomination process, coordination of independent selection juries, and preparation of recipient recommendations for approval by Calgary City Council.

Meeting materials related to the Calgary Awards, including committee reports and recommendations, are published through Calgary City Council’s public meeting portal. These records document Calgary City Council's approval steps associated with the awards program in the months leading up to nominations and awards.

== Recipients ==
=== 2026 ===
The 2026 Calgary Awards were presented on June 17, 2026.

Award category	Recipient
Community Achievement Award: Arts	Wunmi Idowu
Community Achievement Award: Calgarian of the Year	Martha Hart
Community Achievement Award: Community Advocate – Individual	Lorraine Robinson
Community Achievement Award: Community Advocate – Organization	Momentum
Community Achievement Award: Education	Pamela Farrell
Community Achievement Award: Grant MacEwan Lifetime Achievement	Gordon Moores Bullivant
Community Achievement Award: Heritage	The Confluence Historic Site & Parkland
Community Achievement Award: Social Impact – Business	XhAle Brew Co.
Community Achievement Award: Youth	Evan Li
International Achievement Award	Henry Tsang
Award for Accessibility – Universal Design	Urban Society for Aboriginal Youth (USAY)
Environmental Achievement Award	Habitat for Humanity Southern Alberta
City of Calgary W.O. Mitchell Book Prize	Marcello Di Cintio

=== 2025 ===
The 2025 Calgary Awards were presented on June 18, 2025.

Award category	Recipient
Community Achievement Award: Arts	Karen Ball
Community Achievement Award: Calgarian of the Year	Syed Najam Hassan
Community Achievement Award: Community Advocate – Individual	Lucy O. Reyes
Community Achievement Award: Community Advocate – Organization	Discovery House
Community Achievement Award: Education	Olumuyiwa Igbalajobi
Community Achievement Award: Grant MacEwan Lifetime Achievement	Arthur Clark
Community Achievement Award: Heritage	Christine Leppard
Community Achievement Award: Social Impact – Business	Blackline Safety
Community Achievement Award: Youth	Max Du
Environmental Achievement Award	Calgary Drop-In Centre
International Achievement Award	Julie Sedivy
City of Calgary W.O. Mitchell Book Prize	Julie Sedivy

=== 2024 ===
The 2024 Calgary Awards recipients were recognized in twelve award categories.

Award category	Recipient
Community Achievement Award: Arts	Immigrant Council for Arts Innovation
Community Achievement Award: Calgarian of the Year	Heather Culbert
Community Achievement Award: Community Advocate – Individual	Karen Begg
Community Achievement Award: Community Advocate – Organization	Aboriginal Friendship Centre of Calgary
Community Achievement Award: Education	Bill Rosehart
Community Achievement Award: Grant MacEwan Lifetime Achievement	Elaine Cairns
Community Achievement Award: Heritage	Edworthy Park Heritage Society
Community Achievement Award: Social Impact – Business	Park by Sidewalk Citizen and Sidewalk Citizen Bakery
Community Achievement Award: Youth	Laiba Nasir
Environmental Achievement Award	Goodwill Industries of Alberta
International Achievement Award	Naser El-Sheimy
City of Calgary W.O. Mitchell Book Prize	Clem Martini (Cantata and The Extinction Therapist)

=== 2023 ===
The 2023 Calgary Awards recipients were recognized in thirteen award categories.

Award category	Recipient
Award for Accessibility	Garden Loft
Community Achievement Award: Arts	East Side Dance Festival Society
Community Achievement Award: Calgarian of the Year	Usman Tahir Jutt
Community Achievement Award: Community Advocate – Individual	Meenu Ahluwalia
Community Achievement Award: Community Advocate – Organization	Centre for Sexuality
Community Achievement Award: Education	Chantalle Bourque
Community Achievement Award: Grant MacEwan Lifetime Achievement	Elder Dr. Reg Crowshoe and Elder Rosemary Crowshoe
Community Achievement Award: Heritage	Josh Traptow
Community Achievement Award: Social Impact – Business	inclusion FACTOR
Community Achievement Award: Youth	Jeanae Elisha C. Ventura
Environmental Achievement Award	Carbon Upcycling Technologies
International Achievement Award	Dr. Kristina Rinker
City of Calgary W.O. Mitchell Book Prize	Suzette Mayr (The Sleeping Car Porter)

=== 2022 ===
The 2022 Calgary Awards recipients included the following individuals and organizations.

Award category	Recipient
Award for Accessibility	Accessible Housing for Inclusio
Community Achievement Award: Arts	Xstine P. Cook
Community Achievement Award: Citizen of the Year	Jane Wachowich
Community Achievement Award: Commerce	Not awarded
Community Achievement Award: Community Advocate – Individual	Lanre Ajayi
Community Achievement Award: Community Advocate – Organization	Sagesse
Community Achievement Award: Education	Dr. Turin Chowdhury
Community Achievement Award: Grant MacEwan Lifetime Achievement	David Este
Community Achievement Award: Heritage	Madisen Hvidberg
Community Achievement Award: Youth	Alexander Greco
Environmental Achievement Award	Miistakis Institute
Environmental Achievement Award (honourable mention)	Soap for Hope Canada
International Achievement Award	Barry Sanders
City of Calgary W.O. Mitchell Book Prize	Jaspreet Singh (My Mother, My Translator)

=== 2020 ===
The 2020 Calgary Awards recipients included the following individuals and organizations.

Award category	Recipient
Community Achievement Award: Arts	Shelley Youngblut
Community Achievement Award: Citizen of the Year	Marichu Antonio
Community Achievement Award: Commerce	Dr. Breanne Everett
Community Achievement Award: Community Advocate – Individual	Aneela Azeem
Community Achievement Award: Community Advocate – Organization	Calgary Seniors' Resource Society
Community Achievement Award: Education	Dr. Rahat Zaidi
Community Achievement Award: Grant MacEwan Lifetime Achievement	Dr. John Lacey
Community Achievement Award: Heritage	Not awarded
Community Achievement Award: Youth	Curtis Ruttle
Award for Accessibility	YMCA Calgary, Shane Homes YMCA at Rocky Ridge
Environmental Achievement Award	Canadian Wildlife Federation, WILD Outside Program
International Achievement Award	Dr. Aamir Jamal
City of Calgary W.O. Mitchell Book Prize	Alexandra Latos (Under Shifting Stars)

== Nominees ==
=== 2026 ===
The City of Calgary published the names of nominees for the 2026 Calgary Awards across twelve award categories. The published list includes individuals, organizations and groups. The W.O. Mitchell Book Prize submissions were published separately.

2026 Calgary Awards nominees
Award category	Nominees
Arts	Marvit Ahanonu; Hajar Al Khouzaii; Alvin Francia and Limuel Vilela; Ashley Frerichs; Justine Giles; Jeff Humphreys; Wunmi Idowu; Nancy Laberge; Sushree Mishra; Daniel Pelton; Fredy Rivas; Yolanda Sargeant; Ishita Singla, Aditya Chaudhuri, Aseem Pandey, Bhupinderjit Chana, Partha Sarathi Gouda, Shivek Kanwar and Ineha Thind; Tara Wilson; Calgary Performing and Visual Arts, Teachers Central Memorial High School; The Calgary Songsmiths
Calgarian of the Year	Dr. Martha Hart; Uyen Nguyen; Monica Tawfik; Dr. Gabrielle (Tsapinaaki) Weasel Head
Community Advocate – Individual	Adekunbi Adetona; Abby Araji; Ahmad Baker; Adam Casole-Buchanan; Duaa-Azeem Choudhary; Jay Chowdhury; Chika Daniels; Ismael Diallo; Matthew Edward; Leanna Kielau; Melanie MacDonald; Maria Marcil; Kris McPherson; Tatiana Meneses-Sab; Afirah Naz; Nadine Niba; Marvin Olson; Shuo Qiu; Lorraine Robinson; Akshay Saxena; Dhruv Sharma; Keith Simmons; Nancy-Lynn Stevenson; Miwa Takeuchi; Nick Twyman; Susan Tyrrell; Grace Yan
Community Advocate – Organization	Able Sail Association of Alberta; Alberta Adolescent Recovery Centre; Animal Rescue Foundation (ARF); Autism Aspergers Friendship Society of Calgary; Between Friends; Calgary Construction Association; Cerebral Palsy Alberta; cSPACE Projects; Elephant Artist Relief Society; Guru Nanak Free Kitchen Calgary; I Can for Kids; Immigrant Outreach Society; Junior League of Calgary; LOUD Art Society; Momentum; Not In My City; PCHS Calgary; Ruth’s House Society; Skipping Stone Foundation; Soup Sisters; Sport Calgary; Stardale Women’s Group; Sustainable Calgary; The Alex Community Food Centre; The Calgary Bridge Foundation for Youth; The Veterans Association Food Bank; Wings of Hope for Africa Foundation; Wood’s Homes; YMCA Calgary
Education	Peter Adeleke; Melissa Allan; Erin Boukall; John Brown; Lisa Byrgesen; Dr. Pamela Farrell; Brendan Hagan; Casey Kennedy
Grant MacEwan Lifetime Achievement	Gordon Bullivant
Heritage	Diane Dalkin; Lougheed House Conservation Society; Studio North; The Confluence Historic Site and Parkland; The Ranchmens Club
Social Impact – Business	Innerlogue Therapy & Psychology; JB Music Therapy; Microserve; Resilient Hearts; SANDSTONE Asset Management; The Arrowhead Live Music & Events Center and Hitman’s Bar; XhAle Brew Co.
Youth	Kingston Chee; Evan Li; Wren Rafael Marcelo; Kamran Shukoor; Jhanna Mariel Villanueva
International Achievement Award	Sharon Fraiman; Tola Jimoh; Siu Ming Kwok; Terrance Malkinson; Bijoy Menon; Dr. Melanie Carina Schmoll; Dr. Henry Tsang
Award for Accessibility – Universal Design	Synaptic Neuro Rehabilitation Centre; The Urban Society for Aboriginal Youth (USAY) Indigenous Youth Centre
Environmental Achievement Award	Chris Williams; Alberta Ecotrust Foundation: ENBIX; Arusha Centre; Calgary Region Airshed Zone Society; Earth Science for Society (ESfS); Habitat for Humanity Southern Alberta
