= Robert Hilles =

Canadian poet and novelist (born 1951)

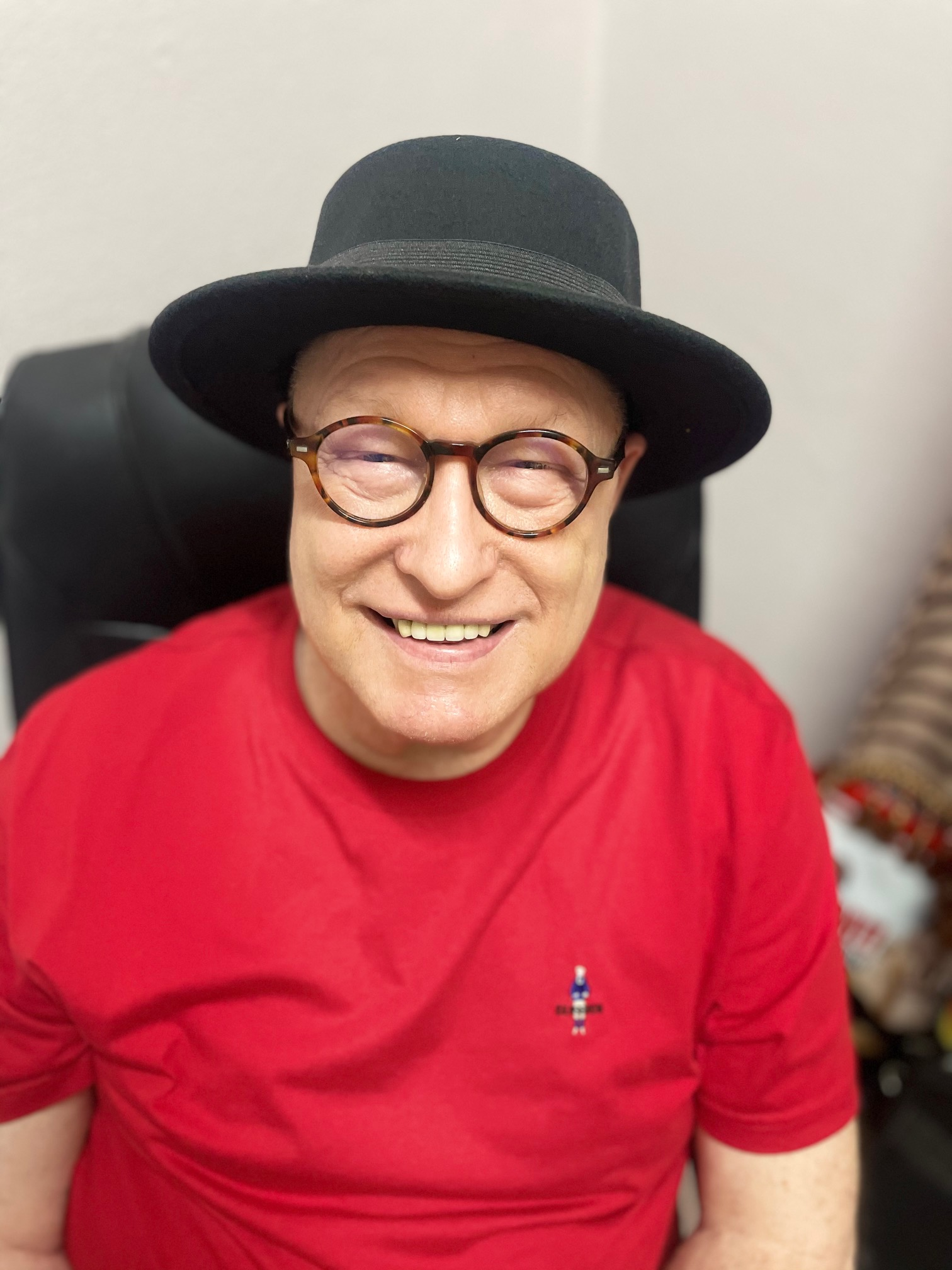
- Born: November 13, 1951 (age 74); Kenora, Ontario, Canada
- Education: University of Calgary
- Occupations: Poet; novelist
- Years active: 1980–present
- Awards: 1994 Governor General's Awards: Alberta Literary Awards
- Website: roberthilles.wordpress.com/about-robert-hilles/

Robert Hilles (born November 13, 1951) is a Canadian poet and novelist. Born in Kenora, Ontario, he grew up at Longbow Lake, Ontario and left in 1971 to attend university and later study at the University of Calgary, earning a BA in Psychology and English in 1976. He also holds an MSc in Educational Psychology, earned at the university in 1985.

For ten years he acted as the managing editor of Dandelion, the oldest surviving literary magazine in Alberta. In 2001, he moved to British Columbia and has been active in the literary community there, especially on Salt Spring Island where he lived for 17 years. With other writers, he helped to set up a scholarship for beginning writers on Salt Spring and also organized a new reading series on the island. He moved to Nanaimo in 2019.

He served on the executive of the League of Canadian Poets for five years and in 1996 was sent by the League of Canadian Poets and the Department of Foreign Affairs to represent Canada at an International Poetry Festival in Japan. Hilles won the 1994 Governor General's Award for Poetry for Cantos From A Small Room (1993). In the same year, his first novel, Raising of Voices (1993), won the Writers' Guild of Alberta's George Bugnet Award for Novel. He has published sixteen books of poetry and five books of prose.

Wrapped Within Again, New and Selected Poems was published in the fall of 2003 and won the Stephan Stephansson Award for Poetry. His second novel, A Gradual Ruin, was published by Doubleday Canada in 2004. His books have also been shortlisted for the Milton Acorn People's Poetry Prize, the W.O. Mitchell City of Calgary Book Prize, the Stephan G. Stephansson Award for Poetry, and the Howard O'Hagan Award for Short Fiction.

== Bibliography ==
=== Books ===
- Look the Lovely Animal Speaks (1980), ISBN 0-88801-053-2
- The Surprise Element (1982)
- An Angel in the Works (1983), ISBN 0-88982-052-X
- Outlasting the Landscape (1989), ISBN 0-920633-61-7
- Finding the Lights on (1991), ISBN 0-919897-27-4
- A Breath at a Time (1992), ISBN 0-88982-110-0
- Raising of Voices (1993), ISBN 0-88753-272-1
- Cantos from a Small Room (1993), ISBN 0-919897-37-1 – winner of the 1994 Governor General's Award for Poetry
- Near Morning (1995), ISBN 0-88753-271-3
- Kissing the Smoke (1996), ISBN 0-88753-283-7
- Nothing Vanishes (1996), ISBN 0-919897-52-5
- Breathing Distance: A Book of Odes (1997), ISBN 0-88753-297-7
- Somewhere Between Obstacles and Pleasure (1999), ISBN 0-88753-327-2
- Higher Ground (2001), ISBN 1-895836-80-8
- Wrapped Within Again: New and Selected (2003), ISBN 0-88753-384-1
- A Gradual Ruin: A Novel (2004), ISBN 0-385-65961-X
- Calling the Wild (2005), ISBN 0-88753-411-2
- Slow Ascent (2006), ISBN 0-88753-428-7
- Partake (2010), ISBN 978-0-88753-474-4
- Time Lapse (2012), ISBN 978-0-88753-494-2
- Line (2018), ISBN 978-0-88753-592-5
- Shimmer (2019), ISBN 978-0-88753-602-1
- Don't Hang Your Soul on That, (Novel), Guernica Editions, (2021), ISBN 9781771836081
- From God's Angle, Black Moss Press, (Prose Poems), (2021), ISBN 978-0-88753-623-6
- The Pink Puppet, Mosaic Press (Flash Fiction), (2023), ISBN 978-1-77161-696-6
- Wood Never Dies, poetry book now complete
- A Hint of Salt, Short Story collection is now complete.
- One True Note, novel set in Canada and US from1919 to 1921
- Messy, Novella set in Kenora from 1959 to 1990
- To Parts Unknown, a novel set in Northwestern Ontario in the works.
- An Ocean of Wants, the second novel set in Thailand in the works
- Morning Poems, In the works.

=== Anthologies ===
Ride Off Any Horizon I and II, NeWest Press.

Anthology of Magazine Verse & Yearbook of American Poetry, Monitor Books, California. 1988.

Men and Women (Together and Alone), The Spirit That Moves Us Press, Iowa. 1988.

A Discord of Flags, a discord of flags, Toronto, 1992.

Snapshots, Black Moss Press, 1992.

Boundless Alberta, NeWest Press, 1993 (Short Story)

Reconsilable Differences, Bayeaux Press, 1994

That Sign of Perfection, Black Moss Press, 1995 (Nonfiction)

Fresh Tracks, Polestar, 1998

In the Clear, Thistledown Press, 1998

Losers First, Black Moss Press, 1999

I Want to be the Poet of Your Knee Caps, Black Moss Press, 1999.

Threshold, University of Alberta Press, 1999

Henry's Creature, Black Moss Press, 2000.

Smaller Than God, Black Moss Press, 2001.

Gifts: Poems for Parents, Sumach Press, 2002.

Writing the Terrain, University of Calgary Press, 2005.

Rocksalt, Mother Tongue Publishing, 2008

111 West Coast Literary Portraits, Mother Tongue Publishing, 2012

Window Fishing: The night we caught Beatlemania, Hidden Book Press, 2014

Where the Nights are Twice as Long, Goose Lane Editions, 2015

Carteggi Letterari, Italian Online Anthology, 2016

Blackberries, Salt Spring Library Anthology, 2018

Plume 9, St. Petersburg Florida, 2021

The Beauty of Being Elsewhere, Hidden Brook Press, Brighton, Ontario, 2021

=== Magazines ===
His poetry and fiction have appeared in numerous magazines in North America and abroad including:

The Windsor Review, Prairie Fire, Event, Capilano Review, West Coast Line, The Fiddlehead, CV 2, Descant, The Antigonish Review, The New Quarterly. Arc, Poetry Canada Review, NeWest Review, Canadian Fiction Magazine, The Forge Literary Magazine, The Write Launch Literary Magazine, The Malahat Review, Canadian Literature, Carousel, The Danforth Review, The JellyFishReview, Open: Journal of Arts & Letters, Varnish Journal, Eclectica Magazine, Mantra Review, Grain Magazine, Juniper: A Poetry Journal, Penultimate Peanut, and Zone 3: A Literary Journal, Plume Poetry Journal, and many others.

== Awards ==
2004 Winner Stephan G. Stephanson Award for Wrapped Within Again.

1994 Winner Governor General's Literary Award for Poetry for Cantos from a Small Room.

1994 Winner Writer's Guild of Alberta Best Novel Award for Raising of Voices.

2004 Finalist for the City of Calgary/W.O. Mitchell Award for Wrapped Within Again.

1998 Finalist for the Milton Acorn People's Poetry Award for Breathing Distance.

1997 Finalist for the City of Calgary/W.O. Mitchell Award for Kissing the Smoke.

1997 Finalist for the Stephan Stephanson Award for Nothing Vanishes.

1996 Finalist for the Writer's Guild of Alberta Best Short Fiction Award for Near Morning.
