= Sue Campbell (philosopher) =

Canadian philosopher (1956–2011)

Susan Leslie Campbell (August 31, 1956 – February 12, 2011) was a Canadian philosopher whose work addressed philosophical psychology, feminist philosophy, aesthetics, and ethics.

== Life and career ==
Susan Leslie Campbell was born in Edmonton. She studied philosophy at the University of Alberta, and then read for a PhD in philosophy at the University of Toronto. Her PhD thesis addressed philosophy of emotion, and formed the basis of her first book, Interpreting the Personal. Her second monograph, Relational Remembering, won the North American Society for Social Philosophy Book Prize in 2003.

Campbell worked at Dalhousie University from 1992 until her death, teaching in the Department of Philosophy and on the Gender and Women's Studies program.

Campbell died on February 12, 2011, at the age of 54.

== Selected publications ==
- Campbell, Sue (1997). Interpreting the Personal: Expression and the Formation of Feelings. Cornell University Press.
- Babbitt, Susan, and Sue Campbell, eds. (1999). Racism and Philosophy. Cornell University Press.
- Campbell, Sue (2003). Relational Remembering: Rethinking the Memory Wars. Rowman & Littlefield.
- Cambell, Sue, Letitia Meynell, and Susan Sherwin, eds. Embodiment and Agency. Penn State University Press.
