= Bruce Zawalsky =

Canadian outdoorsman, bushcraft instructor, and author

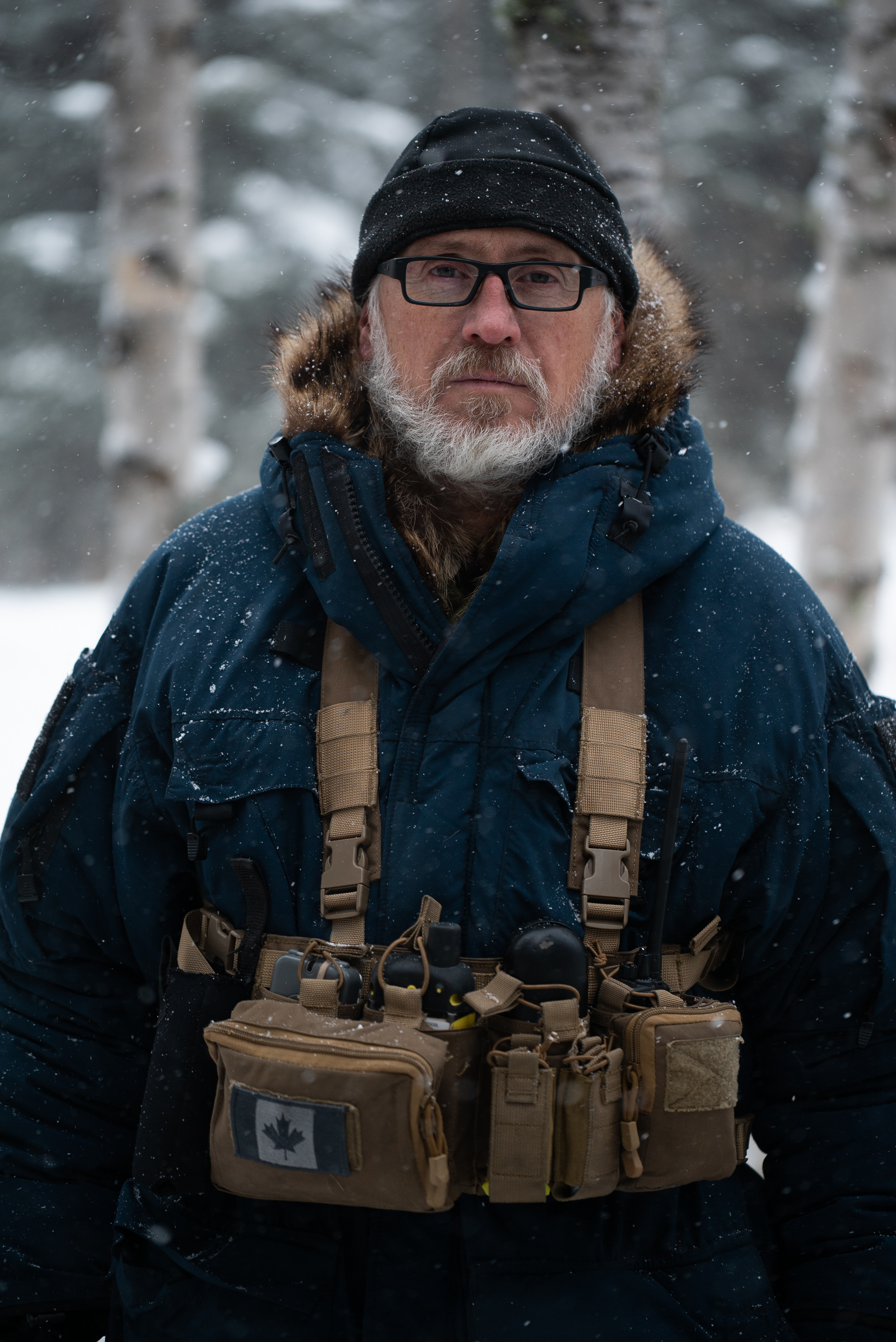
- Zawalsky in 2022
- Born: March 31, 1964 (age 62); York County, Ontario, Canada
- Writing career
- Language: English
- Subjects: Bushcraft, survival
- Notable work: Canadian Wilderness Survival
- Website: boreal.net

Bruce Duncan Zawalsky (born March 31, 1964) is a professional Canadian outdoorsman, bushcraft instructor, and author. He founded and owns the Boreal Wilderness Institute, based in Edmonton, Alberta. He is the author of A Guide to Canadian Wilderness Survival, published by Liard Books in 2017. Zawalsky guided his first backpacking group in the Rocky Mountains in 1981. In 1989, as part of a small six-person group in three canoes, he completed a 92-day 3,600 km canoe expedition between Rocky Mountain House, Alberta and Thunder Bay, Ontario. The expedition involved over sixty portages and 200 km of upstream river paddling, lining, and poling, and was conducted as the completion of an Outdoor Education training program at the University of Alberta. Zawalsky studied with bushcraft expert Mors Kochanski and at Augustana University College, PADI College, the Nordic Ski Institute, and in the Canadian military. He has been a member of the Loyal Edmonton Regiment for more than 34 years.

Zawalsky was born in the Greater Toronto Area and now lives in Edmonton, Alberta.

== Publications ==
- A Guide to Canadian Wilderness Survival (2017)
