= University of Alberta Press =

- Parent company: University of Alberta
- Founded: 1969
- Country of origin: Canada
- Headquarters location: Rutherford Library South, University of Alberta, Edmonton, Alberta
- Distribution: University of Toronto Press (Canada); Hopkins Fulfillment Services (US); Gazelle Book Services (UK)
- Key people: Cathie Crooks (Associate Director and Manager)
- Official website: www.uap.ualberta.ca

University of Alberta Press (UAlberta Press) is a publishing house and a division of the University of Alberta that engages in academic publishing.

== Overview ==
The offices of University of Alberta Press (UAlberta Press) are located in the Rutherford Library on the University of Alberta campus, in Edmonton, Alberta, Canada. Operating since 1969, UAlberta Press is a unit of the Library and Museums portfolio and reports to the Vice-Provost (Library and Museums) and Chief Librarian. UAlberta Press typically publishes between 15 and 25 books each year and has approximately 450 titles available as print editions and 650 titles available in digital editions, including audiobooks, as of 2022. The Press is funded by a combination of sales revenue, licensing fees, project grants, federal and provincial operating grants, research support subsidies, and institutional budget allocation.

=== History ===
UAlberta Press was originally established as a department of the University of Alberta in 1969, one of several academic presses to be established in that decade in Canada. Much of the work was done by Norma and Leslie Gutteridge, both of whom were seconded to the University Press Committee in the spring of 1969, the former being appointed editorial adviser while the latter became chairman of the committee in 1972. By 1974, the Press had grown to an annual budget of $5,000 and was run by three volunteers under their leadership. The university awarded offices to the Press in 1975, at which time Leslie was appointed director, while Norma became the editor. In response to the report of the Symons Royal Commission on Canadian Studies, the Alberta Provincial Government provided enough funding for the Press to hire its first permanent staff member in 1978. Following Leslie's retirement in 1979, Norma became the second director of the Press until her retirement in 1994. By then, UAlberta Press had more than 160 titles in print and had become Alberta's leading scholarly publisher. She was succeeded by Glen Rollans (1995–1999), Linda Cameron (2001–2017), Douglas Hildebrand (2017–2024), and Darcy Cullen (2025–present).

== Publication Areas ==
UAlberta Press acquires and publishes scholarly books as well as works of poetry and literary nonfiction. It is especially noteworthy for its commitment to publishing books of importance to Western and Northern Canada and by Indigenous authors. Thus, UAlberta Press contributes significantly to the variety and diversity of Canadian cultural expression.

=== Scholarly Nonfiction ===
UAlberta Press is dedicated to disseminating books of substantial scholarly merit to the broader public. Although it has published works in various disciplines throughout its history, in recent years the Press has gained significant recognition by publishing scholarship in the humanities and social sciences. These include works of history, sociology, anthropology, criminology and legal studies, critical race theory, gender and sexuality studies, cultural studies, environmental studies, Indigenous studies, literary studies, political science, urban studies, and the emerging field of research-creation. Some of the most prominent titles include:

- The/Les Collected Writings of Louis Riel/Ecrits complets de Louis Riel, completed by an editorial team led by George G.F. Stanley (1985). A critical edition composed of five annotated volumes, this project was partly funded by a grant from the Social Sciences and Humanities Research Council in 1978, at the time the largest grant ever to have been given.
- Shredding the Public Interest: Ralph Klein and 25 Years of One-Party Government by Kevin Taft (1997). Co-published by the Parkland Institute. Taft's book, which challenged Ralph Klein and his provincial government's claims about soaring public service spending, became a national bestseller at roughly 27,000 copies sold, topping the Financial Post's national bestseller list for 14 weeks and eventually being named Trade Book of the Year by the Alberta Book Publishers' Association in 1998. Shredding the Public Interest also placed Taft in the public eye, cementing his reputation as a government critic and prompting Premier Klein to call him a communist and challenge him to run for office.
- The Canadian Dictionary of ASL, edited by Carole Sue Bailey and Kathy Dolby (2002). Winner of the Alberta Educational Book of the Year, Scholarly Book of the Year and Trade Non-Fiction Book of the Year as well as an Award of Merit from the Association for Canadian Studies and the Alcuin Society Citation for Excellence in Book Design in Canada.
- Alberta Elders’ Cree Dictionary/alperta ohci kehtehayak nehiyaw otwestamâkewasinahikan by Nancy LeClaire and George Cardinal (2002).
- Edmonton In Our Own Words by Linda Goyette and Carolina Jakeway Roemmich (2004). Edmonton's official centenary publication.
- Ethics for the Practice of Psychology in Canada by Derek Truscott and Kenneth H. Crook (2004). Second edition published in 2013. Third edition published in 2021.
- The Importance of Being Monogamous: Marriage and Nation Building in Western Canada to 1915 by Sarah Carter (historian) (2008). Winner of the Clio Award, Prairie Region.
- People of the Lakes: Stories of Our Van Tat Gwich’in Elders/Googwandak Nakhwach’ànjòo Van Tat Gwich’in by Vuntut Gwitchin First Nation and Shirleen Smith (2010). Winner of numerous awards, including the Independent Publisher Book Award for Story Teller of the Year, the Tom Fairley Award for Editorial Excellence, the Canadian Aboriginal History Book Prize, the Clio Prize, the Ermine Wheeler-Voegelin Book Award, and the Victor Turner Prize for Ethnographic Writing.
- Disinherited Generations: Our Struggle to Reclaim Treaty Rights for First Nations Women and their Descendants by Nellie Carlson and Kathleen Steinhauer, with Linda Goyette (2013).
- Healing Histories: Stories from Canada's Indian Hospitals by Laurie Meijer Drees (2013).
- Climber's Paradise: Making Canada's Mountain Parks, 1906-1974 by PearlAnn Reichwein (2014). Winner of the Clio Prize, Prairie Region.
- Street Sex Work and Canadian Cities: Resisting a Dangerous Order by Shawna Ferris (2015). Winner of the Outstanding Scholarship Prize, Women's and Gender Studies et Recherches Feminists Association.
- Keetsahnak / Our Missing and Murdered Indigenous Sisters, edited by Kim Anderson, Maria Campbell, and Christi Belcourt (2018).[22] A critical look at the growing epidemic of violence against Indigenous Women in Canada.
- Power Play: Professional Hockey and the Politics of Urban Development by Jay Scherer, David Mills and Linda Sloan McCulloch (2019).
- Our Whole Gwich’in Way of Life Has Changed / Gwich’in K’yuu Gwiidandài’ Tthak Ejuk Gòonlih: Stories from the People of the Land by Leslie McCartney and Gwich'in Tribal Council (2020). Winner of the Labrecque-Lee Book Prize, the Oral History Association Book Award, and the Alberta Book Awards Scholarly and Academic Book of the Year.
- Indigenous Women and Street Gangs: Survivance Narratives by Amber, Bev, Chantel, Jazmyne, Faith, Jorgina and Robert Henry (2021).
- Canadian Performance Documents and Debates: A Sourcebook, edited by Anthony J. Vickery, Glen F. Nichols and Allana C. Lindgren (2022).

=== Literary Nonfiction ===
In addition to scholarship, UAlberta Press publishes works of poetry and creative nonfiction. It has played a significant role in the development of many Canadian writers, especially those from Alberta and other parts of Western Canada.

Many of the most noteworthy literary contributions by UAlberta Press fall into one of their literary series. Under the CuRRents series, for instance, it published Intersecting Sects: A Poet Looks at Science (2011) by Edmonton's first poet laureate Alice Major, as well as The Hornbooks of Rita K (2001), which at the time was the first poetry collection by Robert Kroetsch in eleven years. Major's book went on to receive the Wilfrid Eggleston Award for non-fiction while Kroetsch's collection was shortlisted for the Governor General's Award.

Kroetsch's contributions to Western Canadian literature inspired UAlberta Press to establish the Robert Kroetsch Series, which is dedicated to the publication of Canadian creative writing, short stories, and poetry. Within this series, UAlberta Press has published several notable works, such as The Bad Wife by Micheline Maylor (2021, Winner of the Robert Kroetsch Award for Poetry), I Am Still Your Negro: An Homage to James Baldwin by Valerie Mason-John (2020, Winner of the AUPresses Book, Jacket, & Journal Show Poetry and Literature Award), Annie Muktuk and Other Stories by Norma Dunning (2017, winner of the Danuta Gleed Literary Award), and 100 Days by Otoniya J. Okot Bitek (2016, winner of the AAUP Book, Jacket & Journal Show Awards for Poetry & Literature and Jackets & Covers, the Glenna Luschei Prize for African Poetry, and the INDIEFAB Book of the Year Award for Poetry).

The CLC Kreisel Lecture Series is another noteworthy series published by UAlberta Press. Following the University of Alberta's establishment of The Canadian Literature Centre (CLC) in 2006, the institute has hosted an annual lecture by a prominent Canadian writer that is then co-published by the CLC and UAlberta Press. Named in honour of Officer of the Order of Canada and Professor Henry Kreisel, these short books are dedicated to nurturing public as well as scholarly engagement with the pressing concerns of writers in Canada, including Indigenous resurgence, oppression and social justice, cultural identity, place and displacement, the spoils of history, storytelling, censorship, language, reading in a digital age, literary history, personal memory, and, most recently, art during the COVID-19 pandemic. Some of the most prominent authors and titles published by UAlberta Press under this series include Cherie Dimaline (An Anthology of Monsters, 2023),[34] Vivek Shraya (Next Time There’s a Pandemic, 2022), Leanne Betasamosake Simpson (A Short History of the Blockade, 2021), Dionne Brand (An Autobiography of the Autobiography of Reading, 2020), Heather O'Neill (Wisdom in Nonsense, 2018), Margaret Atwood (The Burgess Shale, 2017), Tomson Highway (A Tale of Monstrous Extravagance, 2015), Esi Edugyan (Dreaming of Elsewhere, 2014), Lawrence Hill (Dear Sir, Intend to Burn Your Book, 2013), and Eden Robinson (The Sasquatch at Home, 2011, winner of the Alcuin Society Citations for Excellence in Book Design for non-fiction and the Publishers Association of the West Design and Production Awards for Short Stories & Poetry).

Recently, two additional series have broadened the genre scope of UAlberta Press's literary production. One of these, the Wayfarer series, is dedicated to the publication of literary travel narratives and has already produced several noteworthy titles, such as Ken Haigh's On Foot to Canterbury (2021, shortlisted for the Hilary Weston Writers’ Trust Prize for Nonfiction), Tiny Lights for Travellers by Naomi K. Lewis (2019, shortlisted for the Governor General Literary Award for Nonfiction and winner of the Wilfrid Eggleston Award for Nonfiction and the Vine Award for Canadian Jewish Literature), and Tony Robinson-Smith's The Dragon Run (2018, winner of the INDIE Book of the Year Awards for Adventure & Recreation). The other recent addition to the Press's portfolio is the Women's Voices from Gaza Series, which seeks to publish oral histories that honour women's unique and underrepresented perspectives on the social, material, and political realities of Palestinian life. Titles published thus far include Madeeha Hafez Albatta's A White Lie (2020), and Sahbaa Al-Barbari's Light the Road of Freedom (2021).

== Recent Developments ==
Like many scholarly presses, UAlberta Press has made significant efforts to keep pace with technological and environmental innovations. These include a growing emphasis on accessibility, the expansion of the Press's list of open access titles, and a commitment to protecting the environment by printing on stock that contains 100% consumer recycled fibres and is acid and chlorine-free.

UAlberta Press celebrated its fiftieth anniversary in 2019 by introducing a refreshed visual identity, with a new logo and colophon designed by Susan Colberg.

== Industry associations & Awards ==
UAlberta Press has been named Mel Hurtig Publisher of the Year at the Alberta Book Publishing Awards four times (2005, 2011, 2015, and 2020). UAlberta Press wins many awards for book design and cover design, largely the work of in-house designer Alan Brownoff.

- Book Publishers Association of Alberta
- Association of Canadian Publishers
- Association of Canadian University Presses/Association des presses universitaires canadiennes
- Association of University Presses
