= Nancy Holmes =

Canadian poet and educator (born 1959)

Nancy Holmes (born February 9, 1959) is a Canadian poet and educator.

== Biography ==
Holmes was born in Edmonton and went to high school in Toronto. She then attended the University of Calgary where she received her MA in English.

She has published four collections of poetry and many short stories. Her poetry and fiction have been published in A Room of One's Own, Lichen, The Malahat Review, Matrix, Prairie Fire, Grain, The Harpweaver, and The Antigonish Review. Holmes is an associate professor of English and Creative Writing at the University of British Columbia Okanagan.

== Works ==
- Valancy and the New World (Kalamalka Press, 1988)
- Down to the Golden Chersonese: Victorian Lady Travellers (Sono Nis, 1991)
- The Adultery Poems (Ronsdale, 2002)
- Mandorla (Ronsdale Press, 2005)
- Open Wide a Wilderness: Canadian Nature Poems (2008)
- The Flicker Tree: Okanagan Poems (2012)
- Arborophobia (University of Alberta Press, 2022)
