= Robert J. H. Morrison =

Canadian author, editor, and academic (born 1961)

Robert J. H. Morrison (born 6 January 1961) is a Canadian author, editor, and academic. From 2019 to 2024, he was British Academy Global Professor at Bath Spa University. At present, he is Queen's National Scholar at Queen's University, Kingston, Ontario. He is particularly interested in the British Romantic poets, the Regency years (1811–1820), Blackwood's Edinburgh Magazine, Jane Austen, Thomas De Quincey, the Beat Generation, and the medical humanities.

== Early life ==
Morrison was born and raised in Lethbridge, Alberta. He was educated at the University of Lethbridge, where he gained a Bachelor of Arts in English in 1983. He later pursued a Master of Philosophy at the University of Oxford, which he completed in 1987. In 1991, Morrison earned his PhD at the University of Edinburgh.

== Academic career ==
Morrison is Queen's National Scholar at Queen's University in Kingston, Ontario. He was British Academy Global Professor at Bath Spa University from 2019 to 2024. He was elected Fellow of the Royal Society of Canada in 2017. He received the University of Lethbridge Distinguished Alumnus of the Year award in 2013. He has been the recipient of a number of teaching awards, including the Frank Knox Award for Excellence in Teaching (2006, 2008, 2014), the W. J. Barnes Award for Excellence in Teaching (2006, 2018), and the Ontario Undergraduate Student Alliance Teaching Award (2008). Morrison maintains the Thomas De Quincey Homepage, a site devoted to the study of the life and writings of its namesake.

== Writer ==
Morrison's most recent book, The Regency Years, During Which Jane Austen Writes, Napoleon Fights, Byron Makes Love, and Britain Becomes Modern was published in North America by W. W. Norton. Under the title The Regency Revolution: Jane Austen, Napoleon, Lord Byron, and the Making of the Modern World, it was published in Britain by Atlantic. The Regency Years was longlisted for the RBC Taylor Prize, and named by The Economist as one of its 2019 Books of the Year. As The Regency Revolution, it was also longlisted for the Elma Dangerfield Prize and shortlisted for the Historical Writers' Association Crown Award for the best in historical non-fiction.

Morrison's 2009 biography of Thomas De Quincey—The English Opium Eater—was shortlisted for the James Tait Black Memorial Prize in Biography. He is the co-general editor of The Selected Works of Leigh Hunt, and editor of Hunt's essays, 1822–38 (Pickering and Chatto, 2003). He is the editor of three volumes of the Works of Thomas De Quincey, and co-editor of a fourth (Pickering and Chatto, 2000–03). With Daniel Sanjiv Roberts, he edited Romanticism and Blackwood's Magazine: "An Unprecedented Phenomenon" (2013) and Thomas De Quincey: New Theoretical and Critical Directions (2008). For Oxford University Press, he edited Thomas De Quincey's Confessions of an English Opium-Eater and Other Writings (2013), and Thomas De Quincey's On Murder (Oxford, 2006), and co-edited (with Chris Baldick) The Vampyre and Other Tales of the Macabre (1997), and Tales of Terror from Blackwood's Magazine (1995). He produced Jane Austen's Pride and Prejudice: A Sourcebook for Routledge (2005), and he edited Richard Woodhouse's Cause Book: The Opium-Eater, the Magazine Wars and the London Literary Scene in 1821 as a complete issue of the Harvard Library Bulletin (1998).

== Personal life ==
Morrison is married to Carole Beaudin. They have two children.

== Bibliography ==
- The Oxford Handbook of British Romantic Prose. Oxford University Press. 2024.
- The Regency Revolution: Jane Austen, Napoleon, Lord Byron, and the Making of the Modern World. Atlantic, 2019.
- The Regency Years, During Which Jane Austen Writes, Napoleon Fights, Byron Makes Love, and Britain Becomes Modern. W. W. Norton. 2019.
- The 21st-Century Oxford Authors: Thomas De Quincey. Oxford University Press. 2019.
- Thomas De Quincey, Confessions of an English Opium-Eater and Other Writings. Oxford University Press. 2013.
- Co-editor with Daniel Sanjiv Roberts, Romanticism and Blackwood's Magazine: "An Unprecedented Phenomenon". Palgrave. 2013.
- Jane Austen's Persuasion: An Annotated Edition. Belknap Press of Harvard University Press. 2011.
- The English Opium Eater: A Biography of Thomas De Quincey. Weidenfeld & Nicolson / Pegasus. 2009 [2010].
- Co-editor with Daniel Sanjiv Roberts, Thomas De Quincey: New Theoretical and Critical Directions. Routledge. 2008.
- Thomas De Quincey's On Murder. Oxford University Press. 2006.
- Jane Austen's Pride and Prejudice: a Literary Sourcebook. Routledge. 2005.
- The Selected Works of Leigh Hunt, Volume Three. Pickering and Chatto. 2003.
- The Works of Thomas De Quincey, Volumes Seven, Eight, and Sixteen. Pickering and Chatto. 2003.
- Co-editor with Chris Baldick, The Vampyre and Other Tales of the Macabre. Oxford University Press. 1997.
- Co-editor with Chris Baldick, Tales of Terror from Blackwood's Magazine. Oxford University Press. 1995.
