= Darlene Quaife =

Canadian novelist

Darlene Alice Quaife (née Barry) (born September 1, 1948, in Calgary, Alberta) is a Canadian novelist. Her first novel, Bone Bird, won a 1990 Commonwealth Writers Prize, for Best First Book, Canada and the Caribbean.

Quaife was educated at the University of Alberta, from which she received a Master of Arts degree in 1986. She is a past president of the Writers' Guild of Alberta, and a former director and founding member of Wordfest.

She lives in Priddis, Alberta.

== Selected bibliography ==
- Bone Bird, Turnstone Press, 1989, ISBN 978-0-88801-133-6
- Days and Nights on the Amazon, Turnstone Press, 1994, ISBN 9780888011831
- Death Writes: A Curious Notebook - 1997; Arsenal Pulp Press, 2002, ISBN 978-1-55152-038-4
- Polar Circus, Turnstone Press, 2001, ISBN 0-88801-253-5
