= Myrna Kostash =

Canadian writer and journalist

Myrna Kostash (born September 2, 1944) is a Canadian writer and journalist. She has published several non-fiction books and written for many Canadian magazines including Chatelaine. Of Ukrainian descent, she was born in Edmonton, Alberta and educated at the University of Alberta, the University of Washington, and the University of Toronto. She resides in Edmonton, Alberta.

== Career ==
A founding member of The Periodical Writers' Association of Canada and of the Writers' Guild of Alberta, she served as president of the WGA (1989–1990) and as chair of The Writers' Union of Canada (1993–1994). She served as Alberta representative to the board of governors of the Canadian Conference of the Arts (1996–2000). She is a member of the Writers' Union of Canada, the Writers' Guild of Alberta, the Saskatchewan Writers' Guild and PEN. She is a founding member of the Creative Nonfiction Collective, and served as its president 2006–2009. She has also for several years been an executive member of the board of directors of the Parkland Institute, an organization dedicated to social research and located at the University of Alberta.

Kostash is the recipient of several Canada Council, Alberta Foundation for the Literary Arts and Secretary of State (Multiculturalism) grants. In 1985, she was awarded a Silver citation in the National Magazine Awards and was short-listed in 1997. In 1999, she was a finalist in the Western Magazine Awards. In 1988, her book, No Kidding: Inside the World of Teenage Girls, received the Alberta Culture and Writers' Guild of Alberta prizes for Best Non-Fiction. In 1994, she was awarded the same prize for her book, Bloodlines: A Journey Into Eastern Europe. In 1993, she was a participant in the Maclean-Hunter Arts Journalism Seminar, the Banff Centre for the Arts, under the direction of Alberto Manguel. In 2001, her book, The Next Canada: In Search of the Future Nation, was a finalist for the Writers’ Trust of Canada's Shaughnessy Cohen Prize for Political Writing. In 2006, Reading the River: A Traveller’s Companion to the North Saskatchewan was a prize winner at the Saskatchewan Book Awards.

Kostash is a recipient of the Alberta Achievement Award (1988) and of the Alberta Council of Ukrainian Arts "Excellence in Artistry" Award, 2001, the Canadian Conference of the Arts Honorary Life Member award, 2002, the Queen's Jubilee Award, 2002, the Alberta Centennial Medal, 2005, the City of Edmonton's 2006 Citation Award, "Salute to Excellence," and the Writers' Guild of Alberta Golden Pen Lifetime Achievement Award, 2008. She was the 2010 recipient of the Matt Cohen Award: In Celebration of a Writing Life, from the Writers' Trust of Canada, the first writer of creative non-fiction to win the award.

== Works ==
=== Books ===
- Her Own Woman (contributor) - 1975
- Long Way From Home: The Story of the Sixties Generation in Canada - 1980
- All of Baba's Children - 1977
- No Kidding: Inside the World of Teenage Girls - 1989
- The Road Home (contributor) - 1992
- Bloodlines: A Journey into Eastern Europe - 1993
- The Doomed Bridegroom: A Memoir - 1998
- The Next Canada: In Search of Our Future Canada - 2000
- Reading the River: A Traveller's Companion to the North Saskatchewan - 2006
- Frog Lake Reader - 2009
- Prodigal Daughter: A Journey to Byzantium - 2011
- The Seven Oaks Reader - 2016
- Ghosts in a Photograph: A Chronicle - 2022

=== Contributions ===
- Still Ain't Satisfied, Toronto, Women's Press, 1982
- Women Against Censorship, Vancouver, Douglas & McIntyre, 1985
- The Morningside Papers, Toronto, McClelland & Stewart, 1985
- Competition: A Feminist Taboo?, New York, The Feminist Press, 1987
- Ethnicity in a Technological Age, Edmonton, Canadian Institute of Ukrainian Studies, 1988
- Out of Place, Regina, Coteau, 1991
- The Thinking Heart: Best Canadian Essays, Kingston, Quarry, 1991
- Twist and Shout: A Decade of Feminist Writing in This Magazine, Toronto, Second Story, 1992
- Kitchen Talk: Contemporary Women's Prose and Poetry, Red Deer, Red Deer College Press, 1992
- Twenty Years of Multiculturalism, ed. Stella Hryniuk, Winnipeg, St. John's College Press, 1992
- Pens of Many Colours: A Canadian Reader, Toronto, Harcourt Brace Jovanovich, 1993
- Writing Away: The PEN Canada Travel Anthology, Toronto, McClelland & Stewart, 1994
- Imagining Ourselves: Classics of Canadian Non-Fiction, Vancouver, Arsenal Pulp Press, 1994
- Let the Earth Take Note: Anthology of the Milton Acorn Festival, ed. James Deahl, Charlottetown, Milton Acorn Festival Publishing, 1994
- Eating Apples: Knowing Women’s Lives. Eds. Caterina Edwards and Kay Stewart, Edmonton, NeWest Press, 1994
- Why Are You Telling Me This? Eleven Acts of Intimate Journalism, eds. Barbara Moon and Don Obe, Banff, Banff Centre Press, 1997
- Ann Harbuz: Inside Community, Outside Convention, ed. Joan Borsa, Regina, Dunlop Art Gallery, 1997
- Fresh Tracks: Writing From Western Landscape, ed. Pamela Banting, Vancouver, Polestar Press, 1998
- Open Letter: De:Scribing Albertas (Part 1), Tenth Series #2, Spring 1998
- Two Lands New Visions: Stories From Canada and Ukraine, eds. Janice Kulyk Keefer and Solomea Pavlychko, Regina, Coteau Books, 1998
- Literary Pluralities, ed. Christl Verduyn, Peterborough, Broadview Press, 1998
- Arousing Sensation: A Case Study of Controversy Surrounding Art and the Erotic, ed. Sylvie Gilbert, Banff, Banff Centre Press, 1999
- Threshold: An Anthology of Contemporary Writing from Alberta, ed. Srdja Pavlovic, Edmonton, University of Alberta Press, 1999
- Jon Whyte: Mind Over Mountains, ed. Harry Vandervlist, Red Deer, Red Deer Press, 2000
- edge/wise: part II, Canadian Women's Writing at Century's End, Winnipeg, Contemporary Verse 2, Vol. 23, No. 1, Summer 2000
- Going Some Place: Creative Non-fiction Across Canada, ed. Lynne Van Luven, Regina, Coteau Books, 2000
- Wrestling with the Angel: Women Reclaiming Their Lives, eds. Caterina Edwards & Kay Stewart, Red Deer, Red Deer Press, 2000
- The Vintage Book of Canadian Memoirs, ed. George Fetherling, Toronto, Vintage Canada, 2001
- Canada & September 11, ed. George Melnyk, Calgary, Detselig Press, 2002
- AWOL:Tales for Travel-Inspired Minds, eds. Jennifer Barclay and Amy Logan, Toronto, Vintage Canada, 2003
- Listening with the Ear of the Heart: Writers at St Peter's, eds. Dave Margoshes & Shelley Sopher, Muenster, St Peter's Press, 2003
- The Wild Rose Anthology of Alberta Prose, eds. George Melnyk & Tamara Palmer Seiler, University of Calgary Press, 2003
- Postcolonial Subjects: Canadian and Australian Perspectives, ed. Miroslawa Buchholtz, Nicholas Copernicus UP, Cracow 2004
- Edmonton on Location: River City Chronicles, ed. Heather Zwicker, NeWest Press, 2005.
- Place and memory in Canada: Global Perspectives, Proceedings of the 3rd Congress of Polish Association for Canadian Studies, Polska Akademia Umiejetnosci, Cracow, 2005.
- Big Enough Dreams, ed. Debbie Marshall, Learning Community Press, 2006
- Zeitschrift für Kanada-Studien: The Next Canada: The Social Revisited. Ed. Gesellschaft für Kanada-Studien, Augsburg 2006, issues 26.1-26.2, p 131-141 (in English)
- Desire: Women Write About Wanting, ed. Lisa Solod, Seal Press, 2007

=== Other media: film, television radio and stage ===
She has written for film, notably:

- Teach Me to Dance, NFB, (1978)

And for stage:

- 1985, Edmonton, Workshop West, 1982;
- No Kidding, Vancouver, Green Thumb, 1988;
- After the Fall: The Erotic Life of the Left, Edmonton, Catalyst "Write on the Edge" cabaret, 1992;
- File #3168, Edmonton, Catalyst, 1993.

In 1985 she wrote a television drama

- Where is Rosa?, for the University of Alberta Drama Lab.

And on radio:

- Her "Letters From Greece" were broadcast on CBC network, Morningside, in 1984.
- Reunion, a radio play, was produced by John Juliani in 1984 for CBC "Saturday Stereo Theatre";
- The Collaborators for CBC's "Speaking Volumes" in 1989;
- Within the Copper Mountain (1997),
- History 605 (1998),
- The Masked Man in Warsaw (1999),
- Edith Stein: Whose Saint Was She? (2000),
- Pursuing Demetrius (2001),
- Voices from Frog Lake (2005)
- Six Things You Need to Know About Byzantium (2007) for CBC radio Ideas.
