= Merna Summers =

Canadian writer

Merna Summers (born March 22, 1933, in Mannville, Alberta) is a Canadian short story writer. She was awarded the Marian Engel Award in 1989.

== Works ==
- The Skating Party (1974)
- Calling Home (1982)
- North of the Battle (1988)
