= Peter Oliva =

Canadian novelist

Peter Samuel Oliva
- Born: 1964 (age 61–62); Japan
- Occupations: writer, bookseller
- Writing career
- Notable works: Drowning in Darkness, The City of Yes
- Website: www.peteroliva.com

Peter Oliva (born 1964) is a Canadian novelist who lives in Calgary, Alberta.

His first novel, Drowning in Darkness (1993–1999), won the Writers Guild of Alberta Best First Book Award and was shortlisted for a Bressani Prize. The book is set in the Crowsnest Pass of southern Alberta, and in Calabria, Italy. It follows Italian immigrants to Canada in the early 1900s.

A former bookseller, Oliva won the Canadian Bookseller's Association Award for best independent bookstore in Canada, in 1999.

His second novel, The City of Yes, won the 1999 Rogers Writers' Trust Fiction Prize. The main narrative of a Canadian English teacher in Japan is interwoven with the fictionalized account of Ranald MacDonald, a Canadian explorer and the first man to teach English in Japan.
