= Kristjana Gunnars =

Icelandic-Canadian poet and novelist

Kristjana Gunnars (born March 19, 1948, in Reykjavík) is an Icelandic-Canadian poet and novelist. She immigrated to Canada in 1969. Her works explore themes including the 19th-century Icelandic settler experience in Canada's prairie provinces.

== Bibliography ==
=== Novels ===
- The Prowler (1989), winner of the McNally Robinson Book of the Year Award
- The Substance of Forgetting (1992)
- Night Train to Nykobing (1998)

=== Short stories ===
- The Guest House and Other Stories (1992)
- Any Day But This (2004)

=== Poetry ===
- One-eyed Moon Maps (1980)
- Settlement Poems 1 (1980)
- Settlement Poems 2 (1980)
- Wake-pick Poems (1981)
- The Axe's Edge (1983)
- The Night Workers of Ragnorak (1985)
- Exiles Among You (1996)
- Carnival of Longing (1989)
- Silence of the Country (2002)
- Night Train to Nykøbing (2002)

=== Non-fiction ===
- Zero Hour (1991)
- The Rose Garden: Reading Marcel Proust (1996)
- "Stranger at the Door " (2004)

=== Criticism ===
- in German: Elisabeth Paleczek, Schreiben in einem anderen Land: Erinnerung, Gedächtnis und Identität in ausgewählten Werken Laura Goodman Salversons und Kristjana Gunnars'. AV Akademikerverlag, Riga 2013
