= Alice Major =

Canadian poet, writer, and essayist

- Born: Scotland
- Occupation: writer
- Writing career
- Notable works: Welcome to The Anthropocene, and The Chinese Mirror.

Alice Major is a Canadian poet, writer, and essayist, who served as poet laureate of Edmonton, Alberta.

She has published 12 collections of poetry and two collections of essays on poetry and science. Her work has received multiple awards, most recently an honorary doctorate from the University of Alberta.

== Biography ==
Major emigrated from Scotland at the age of eight, and grew up in Toronto, Ontario, before working as a weekly newspaper reporter in central British Columbia. She has lived in Edmonton, Alberta, since 1981. She has a BA (English, history) from Trinity College, Toronto at the University of Toronto. Her first book was a prize-winning YA fantasy novel. Since then she has published 12 books of poetry and an essay collection on poetry and science.

She is past-president of both the Writers' Guild of Alberta and the League of Canadian Poets, as well as former chair of the Edmonton Arts Council. In 2005, she was appointed to a two-year term as the first poet laureate for the City of Edmonton, and then went on to receive the Lieutenant Governor of Alberta Distinguished Artist Award in 2017. During her tenure as poet laureate, she founded the Edmonton Poetry Festival in 2006. In November 2019 she received an honorary doctorate of letters from the University of Alberta.

== Awards (selected) ==
- 2017 Lieutenant Governor of Alberta Distinguished Artist Award.
- 2016 Robert Kroetsch Award for Poetry, for Standard Candles.
- 2012 National Magazine Award Gold Medal (essay category) for “The Ultraviolet Catastrophe.”
- 2012 Wilfrid Eggleston Award for Non-fiction, for Intersecting Sets.
- 2011 Stephan G. Stephansson Award for Memory’s Daughter.
- 2009 Pat Lowther Award for The Office Tower Tales.
- 2001 Malahat Review Long Poem Competition.

=== Shortlisted (selected) ===
- Raymond Souster Award, for Welcome to the Anthropocene (2019), and Standard Candles (2016).
- City of Edmonton Book Prize, for Welcome to the Anthropocene (2019), The Office Tower Tales (2009), Tales for an Urban Sky (2000), and Lattice of the Years (1999).

== Works (selected) ==
=== Books ===
- The Chinese Mirror. (Irwin Publishing, 1988) ISBN 0-7725-1707-X
- Time Travels Light. (Rowan Books, 1992) ISBN 1-895836-01-8
- Lattice of the Years. Bayeux Arts Inc. 1998. ISBN 1-896209-25-4.
- Tales for an Urban Sky. Broken Jaw Press. 1999. ISBN 1-896647-11-1.
- Corona Radiata. (St. Thomas Press, 2000) ISBN 0-9685339-3-0
- Some Bones and a Story. (Wolsak and Wynn, 2001) ISBN 0-919897-74-6
- No Monster (Victoria, Poppy Press, 2002) ISBN 978-1-894603-03-4
- The Occupied World. (University of Alberta Press. 2006) ISBN 978-0-88864-469-5.
- The Office Tower Tales (University of Alberta Press, 2008) ISBN 0-88864-502-3
- Memory's Daughter (University of Alberta Press, 2010) ISBN 978-0-88864-539-5
- Intersecting Sets: A Poet Looks at Science (University of Alberta Press, 2011) ISBN 978-0-88864-595-1
- Standard Candles (University of Alberta Press, 2015) ISBN 978-1-77212-091-2
- Welcome to the Anthropocene (University of Alberta Press, 2018) ISBN 978-1-77212-368-5
- Knife on Snow (Turnstone Press, 2023) ISBN 978-0-88801-768-0
- Triangularity: Essays on Poetry, Science, and Spirit (University of Alberta Press, 2026) ISBN 978-1-77212-874-1

=== Presentations/Papers (selected) ===
- Scansion and Science – The Anne Szumigalski Memorial Lecture, Toronto, 2017.
- A superposition of brains – Provost's Lecture at Stony Brook University of New York (cosponsored by the Humanities Institute at Stony Brook and the C.K. Yang Institute for Theoretical Physics).
- Numbers with Personality: Ordinal Linguistic Personification – presentation to plenary session, Bridges Conference on Mathematics, Music, Art, Architecture, Education, Culture (University of Waterloo, 2017).
- Convocation address – University of Alberta honorary degree presentation, 2019.
- Perhaps the Plaintive Numbers Flow – presented at Bridges Conference on Mathematics, Music, Art, Architecture, Culture (Online, 2020).

=== Anthologies (selected) ===
- Going it Alone: Plays by Women for Solo Performance. (Nuage Editions, 1997) ISBN 978-0-921833-52-9
- What if...? Amazing stories, Monica Hughes Ed. (Tundra Books, 1998) ISBN 978-0-88776-458-5
- Threshold: An Anthology of Contemporary Writing from Alberta. (University of Alberta Press. 1999.) ISBN 978-0-88864-338-4
- Poetry and Spiritual Practice: Selections from Contemporary Canadian Poets (St. Thomas Press, 2002) ISBN 978-0-9685339-7-0
- Reading the River: A traveller’s companion to the North Saskatchewan River (Regina, Coteau Books) ISBN 978-1550503173
- How the Light Gets In: An Anthology of Contemporary Poetry from Canada (Waterford, Ireland, School of Humanities at Waterford Institute of Technology, 2009) ISBN 978-0954028183
- Locations of Grief: An Emotional Geography (Wolsak & Wynn, 2020) ISBN 978-1-989496-14-5
- Waiting: An Anthology of Essays (University of Alberta Press, 2018) ISBN 978-1-77212-383-8
