= Greg Hollingshead =

Canadian novelist (born 1947)

Gregory Hollingshead, CM (born February 25, 1947) is a Canadian novelist. He was formerly a professor of English at the University of Alberta, and he lives in Toronto, Ontario.

He is a graduate of the University of Toronto Schools and the University of Toronto.

His 1995 short story collection The Roaring Girl won the Governor General's Award for English-language fiction at the 1995 Governor General's Awards. His 1998 novel The Healer won the Rogers Writers' Trust Fiction Prize and was shortlisted for the Giller Prize. He was named a Member of the Order of Canada in 2012.

As a professor with the Department of English & Film Studies, Hollingshead taught creative writing classes for 30 years; he retired as emeritus in 2005. From 2000 to 2018, he directed the Writing Studio at the Banff Centre.

== Early life and education ==
Greg Hollingshead was born in Toronto, Ontario, on February 25, 1947, and he grew up in Woodbridge, Ontario. He graduated from the University of Toronto in 1968 with a Bachelor of Arts in English. Hollinghead's first publication was in a 1968 anthology of poets from the House of Anansi called TO Now.

Hollingshead later went back to university to complete his Master of Arts in English at the University of Toronto, and by 1975, he had earned his Ph.D. from the University of London.

== Career ==
Hollingshead published his first collection of stories, Famous Players, in 1982. In 1992, he had completed another two publications, White Buick and Spin Dry, and by 1995, he was awarded the Governor General's Award for Fiction for his story collection, The Roaring Girl.

The Healer, his second novel, was published in 1998 and was nominated for the Giller Prize; it won him the Rogers Writers' Trust Fiction Prize. His third novel, Bedlam, was published in 2004 and was listed for several awards, including the Grant MacEwan Author's Award, the Georges Bugnet Award, and the Edmonton Book Prize.

== Works ==
- Famous Players (1982)
- White Buick (1992, winner of the 1993 Howard O'Hagan Award for Short Fiction and shortlisted for the 1993 Commonwealth Writers' Prize in Canada and Caribbean Region)
- Spin Dry (1992, winner of the 1993 Georges Bugnet Award for the Novel and shortlisted for the 1993 Smithbooks/Books in Canada First Novel Award)
- The Roaring Girl (1995, winner of the 1995 Governor General's Award for Fiction and the winner of the 1996 Howard O'Hagan Award for Short Fiction)
- The Healer (1998, selected in the 1998 Maclean's Five Best Books of Fiction, shortlisted for the 1998 Giller Prize, winner of the 1999 Rogers Writers' Trust Fiction Prize and the 1999 Georges Bugnet Award for the Novel)
- Bedlam (2004, selected for the 1994 Globe 100 Books of the Year, shortlisted for the 1994 Commonwealth Prize for Best Book in Caribbean and Canada Region, shortlisted for the 2005 Grant MacEwan Author's Award, shortlisted for the 2005 Georges Bugnet Award, shortlisted for the 2005 City of Edmonton Book Prize, longlisted for the 2005 IMPAC Dublin Literary Award)
- Act Normal (2015)

== Awards ==
- Howard O'Hagan Award for Short Fiction (1993, 1996)
- Georges Bugnet Award for the Novel (1993, 1999)
- Governor General's Award for Fiction (1995)
- Maclean's Five Best Books of Fiction (1998)
- Rogers Writers' Trust Fiction Prize (1998)
- Globe 100 Books of the Year (2004)
- Lieutenant Governor of Alberta Gold Medal for Excellence in the Arts (2007)
- Queen Elizabeth II Diamond Jubilee Medal (2012)
- Writers' Guild of Alberta Golden Pen Award for Lifetime Achievement (2016)
