= Jon Whyte =

Canadian poet (1941-1992)

- Born: 1941; Banff, British Columbia
- Died: January 6, 1992, aged 50
- Education: B.A. in English, University of Alberta in 1964, M.A.in medieval English in 1967; masters degree in communications, Stanford University, California, in 1974.
- Known for: poet
- Awards: Writer's Guild of Alberta Stephan Stephansson Award for Poetry, 1983; Banff Mountain Book and Film Festival Summit of Excellence Award, 1992 (posthumous)

Jon Whyte (1941 – January 6, 1992) was a Canadian poet, curator and non-fiction writer in Banff, Alberta. He believed poetry was a "public act" and that it informs and educates in a way almost no other medium can. He was an advocate for the Canadian West and specifically the Rockies in both poetry, non-fiction, and his activities as a conservationist. Even today, his name is considered by many to be synonymous with the Canadian Rockies.

== Biography ==
Jon Whyte was born in Banff to Jack White, son of Dave and Barbara Whyte. After public school education in Banff and Medicine Hat, Alberta, he received a B.A. in English from the University of Alberta in 1964, and a master's degree in Medieval English in 1967. Afterwards, he received a master's degree in communications from Stanford University, California, in 1974. His thesis at Stanford was a film documentary, Jimmy Simpson, Mountain Man.

He began to think of poetry favorably when he was 13 or 14 and to craft it as soon as he was able. In time, he became a pioneering poet who sought to record the Rockies through a novel combination of style, language and history but he had many other roles as well. During his time at U of A, Whyte worked as a broadcaster for CKUA Radio and as a sessional instructor at U of A, 1965–1967. Upon returning to Banff, ca.1968, Whyte managed a book store, the Book and Art Den, and helped establish Summerthought Press. In 1969 he became a columnist for the "Crag and Canyon," continuing until 1991, and in 1970 became a board member of the Peter Whyte Foundation (now the Whyte Museum of the Canadian Rockies). From 1980 until his death, Whyte was Curator of Heritage Collections at the museum. He continued to write and publish extensively throughout the 1980s. He was involved with the formation of the Writers' Guild of Alberta and was elected its president in 1990. He received the WGA's Stephan Stephansson Award for Poetry in 1983. Whyte was also active in numerous other organizations, including the League of Canadian Poets, Alberta Museums Association, Canadian Museums Association, Interpretation Canada, and the Alberta Wilderness Association.

Whyte was a conservationist serving in executive capacities with the Bow Valley Naturalists and National and Provincial Parks Association of Canada (now known as CPAWS). He was an author and his books, and contributions to anthologies, magazines and other media, sought to secure a unique cultural origin and identity for western Canada. Counted among them must be his many non-fiction books on aspects, places or artists such as Peter and Catharine Whyte, in the Rocky Mountains, often co-authored. His book on Carl Rungius, "Carl Rungius: Painter of the Western Wilderness", co-authored with E. J. Hart, was published in 1985.

Whyte died of liver cancer in 1992, at the age of 50.

Whyte was given the Banff Mountain Book and Film Festival Summit of Excellence Award, in 1992, posthumously. In 1992, the Writers' Guild of Alberta established the Jon Whyte Memorial Essay Award in his memory. There is also a Jon Whyte Award for Mountain Literature given by the Banff Mountain Film and Book Festival. The book, Jon Whyte: Mind Over Mountains, published in 2000, traces his poetic career from his early years as part of Edmonton's 1960s literary community, through his 1981 poem "Homage: Henry Kelsey" with its illustrations by Dennis Burton, to "The Fells of Brightness" (1983). It includes a foreword by his longtime friend and writer Myrna Kostash.

The Jon Whyte fonds, a collection of his papers, is in the Whyte Museum of the Canadian Rockies Archives and Library. Correspondence with Jon Whyte is also found in Library and Archives Canada under Joan Murray fonds, R4917-8-6-E (Vol. 11, File 46). There is also a transcript of an interview with him under R4917-4-9-E (Vol. 6, File 5).

== Selected works ==
- Three (1973), with Charles Noble and J. O. Thompson OCLC 1094190
- Homage, Henry Kelsey (1981), illustrated by Dennis Burton ISBN 0888010591
- Carl Rungius: Painter of the Western Wilderness (1985), with E. J. Hart ISBN 0881621269
- Indians in the Rockies (1990) ISBN 0919381154
