= Deborah Willis (author) =

Canadian short story writer

- Occupation: Writer
- Website: http://www.deborahwillis.ca/

Deborah Willis is a Canadian writer.

== Biography ==
Daughter of Pauline and Gary Willis, she was born in Calgary, Alberta in 1982 and lived there until leaving to study at the University of Victoria.

Willis has worked as a technical writer and a bookseller at Munro's Books in Victoria, British Columbia, and currently works as Senior Editor and Submissions Coordinator for Freehand Books in Calgary. She lives in Calgary with her partner, Kris Demeanor, and their daughter.

== Writing ==
Willis' fiction has appeared in The Virginia Quarterly, The Iowa Review, The Walrus, and Zoetrope. Her first book, Vanishing and Other Stories (2009), published by Penguin, was named one of The Globe and Mail's Best Books of 2009, and was nominated for the BC Book Prize and the Governor General's Award. It was published in the United States by Harper Perennial in 2010 and translated into Hebrew (Kinneret Zmora-Bitan Dvir Publishing) and Italian (Svanire, Del Vecchio Editore).

Her second collection of short fiction, The Dark and Other Love Stories (2017), was published by Hamish Hamilton, the literary imprint of Penguin Canada, and by W.W. Norton and Company in the U.S. It was longlisted for the 2017 Scotiabank Giller Prize.

Willis was a writer-in-residence at the Joy Kogawa House in Vancouver, at the Calgary Distinguished Writers Program at the University of Calgary for the 2012–2013 academic year, and at MacEwan University in Edmonton.

In 2023, Willis published her novel Girlfriend on Mars. The New York Times wrote in a review: "Every detail is sharply placed by Willis, who has a scorching sense of humor and a soft spot for humanity down here on Earth." The novel was longlisted for the 2023 Giller Prize.
