= Rosemary Nixon =

Canadian author and novelist

- Occupations: Novelist, Writer
- Website: www.rosemarynixon.com

Rosemary Nixon is a Canadian author and novelist whose stories have appeared in Canadian literary magazines and in anthologies. She has published three collections of short stories and a novella in literary presses. She also teaches creative writing and is active as an editor.

== Biography ==
Nixon has lived in Canada, Belgium, France, the Democratic Republic of Congo, and Spain, where she has worked variously as a freelance consultant, a creative writing teacher to classroom teachers, and emerging writers, and as an editor.

Nixon has worked as a writer-in-residence across Canada. She was awarded the 1996-97 Canadian Writer-in-Residency for the Markin-Flanagan Distinguished Writers Programme at the University of Calgary, Alberta. She served as Writer-in Residence at the University of Windsor, Ontario in 2010–2011. In 2011, Nixon was a judge for the CBC Short Story Prize. She was The Canadian Author Association Writer-in-Residence for Southern Alberta in the autumn of 2012. She was Writer-in-Residence at the Saskatoon Public Library, Saskatchewan in 2013–2014. She had the position of Writer-in-Residence at Calgary's Memorial Park Library for the autumn term of 2014. In 2016, she taught Creative Writing in the Master of Fine Arts Creative Writing program at the University of Saskatchewan. She became the University of Windsor Writer-in-Residence again in early 2022. In 2022, she was also Writer-in-Residence at the Alexandra Centre.

Nixon lives in Calgary, Alberta.

== Bibliography ==
- Are you ready to be Lucky? (2013)
- Kalila (2011)
- The Cock's Egg (1994)
- Mostly Country (1991)

== Reception, awards and honours ==
Her collection Mostly Country was shortlisted for the Howard O'Hagan Award. Reviewer Susan Rudy Dorscht quotes Margaret Atwood's characterization: "Mostly Country is not only a collection of stories, it's the portrait of a rural western community — lovingly but toughly observed, told with tenderness and understanding but also with no holds barred." The reviewer states that it speaks "particularly powerfully of the courage of women's lives". Other positive reviews appeared in.

Her collection The Cock's Egg won the Howard O'Hagan Award. Carroll Yoder, reviewing for the Mennonite Quarterly Review, describes this collection as the work of a "skilled writer with an accurate eye for details" who paints "a picture of exploitation and moral depravity that colours the experience of the main characters." Other positive reviews appeared in

Kalila was shortlisted for the Georges Bugnet Award. Donna Kirby Gamache writes that the story of Kalila is "a sad one" yet observes its humorous interludes. Paula Todd writes that Nixon's "brave" writing "sustains", however wrenching the story, adding that she has accomplished "a novel, exquisitely written, about a terrible time but from a great distance." Quill and Quire's review began "Rosemary Nixon's Kalila is an exquisitely crafted jewel of a novel, gripping from beginning to end and astonishing in style and form." Michelle Besner writes that narratives like Nixon's "conduct a type of ideological work that is worlds apart from any simple correlation between womanhood and motherhood."

Are You Ready To Be Lucky? was shortlisted for the Frank O'Connor International Award and the North American Forewards IndieFab Book of the Year. Marissa Stapley describes Nixon's handling of hapless characters thusly: "But deftly, tenderly, Nixon makes pileups of disappointments shine like broken glass in sand." Jade Colbert writes that "Nixon's characters reveal foibles rich with farce and this is where the author is at her best." Other positive reviews appeared in.

In 2018, Nixon received the Lois Hole Award for Editorial Excellence from the Book Publishers Association of Alberta
