= Marcello Di Cintio =

Canadian writer

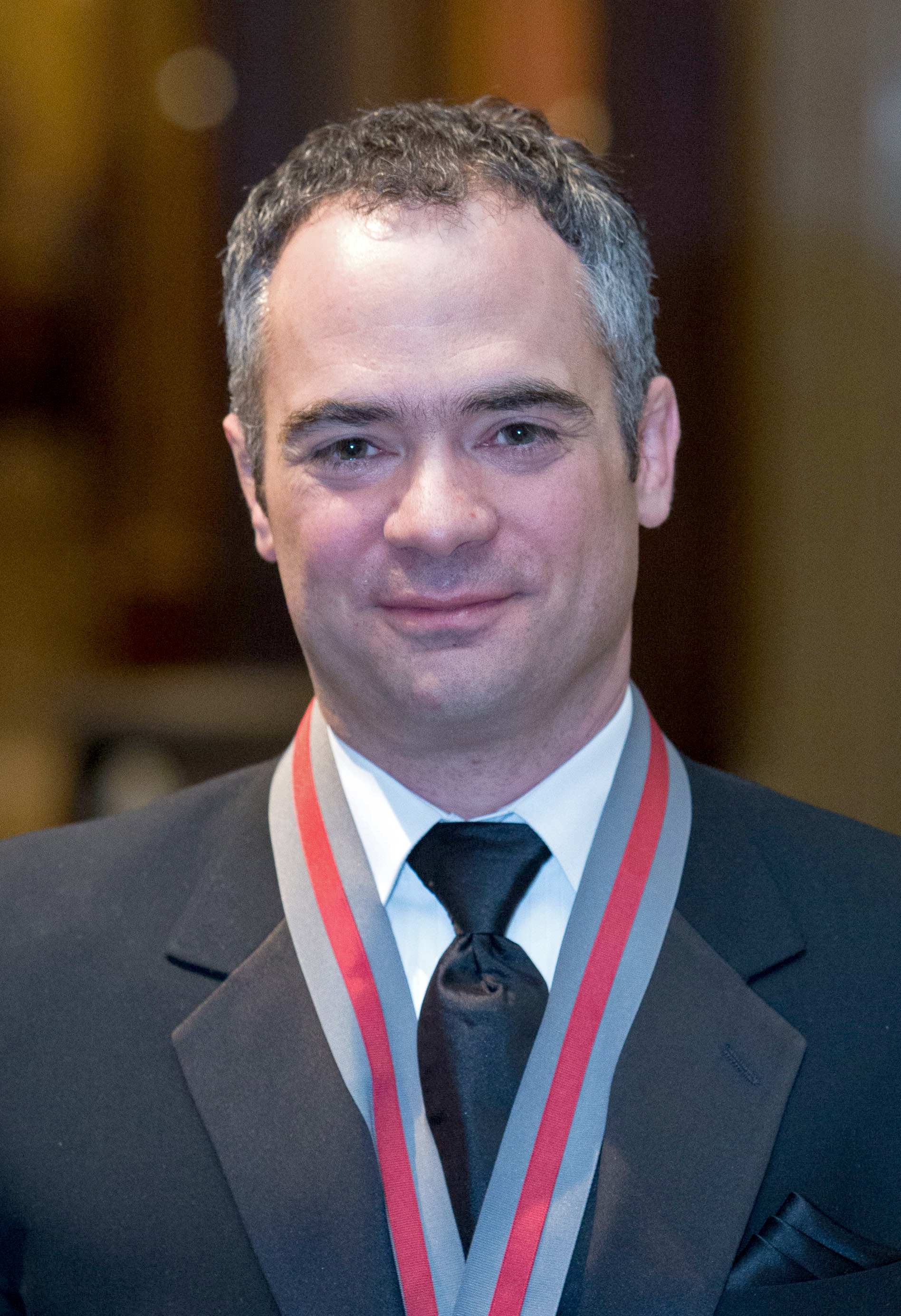
- Born: Calgary, Alberta, Canada
- Occupation: Writer

Marcello Di Cintio is a Canadian writer who has published several books, and many articles and essays in newspapers and magazines across North America and in the United Kingdom. In addition, he has worked as Writer-in-Residence at the University of Calgary, the Calgary Public Library, and the Palestine Writing Workshop.

== Biography ==
Marcello was born in Calgary, Alberta, Canada. He lives in Calgary with his son, Amedeo.

== Education ==
Marcello studied Microbiology and English at the University of Calgary, and was also a member of the University of Calgary Wrestling Team. He graduated in 1997 with both BA and BSc degrees.

== Bibliography ==
=== Nonfiction ===
- Harmattan: Wind Across West Africa (Insomniac Press, 2002)
- Poets and Pahlevans: A Journey Into the Heart of Iran (Knopf Canada, 2006)
- Walls: Travels Along the Barricades (Goose Lane Editions, 2012, Canada; Union Books, 2013, UK; Counterpoint Press, 2013, US; Vakon BG, 2014, Bulgaria; Lux Éditeur, 2017, Quebec and France)
- Pay No Heed to the Rockets: Palestine in the Present Tense (Goose Lane Editions, 2018, Canada; Saqi Books, 2018, UK; Counterpoint Press, 2018, US)
- Driven: The Secret Lives of Taxi Drivers (Biblioasis, 2021)
- Precarious: The Lives of Migrant Workers (Biblioasis, 2025)

== Awards ==
Di Cintio won the 2012 Shaughnessy Cohen Prize for Political Writing for his book Walls: Travels Along the Barricades. The award was made on March 6, 2013 at the Writers' Trust of Canada's annual Politics and the Pen in Ottawa, Ontario. Walls: Travels Along the Barricades was also nominated for the 2013 Charles Taylor Prize for Literary Non-Fiction and the 2013 British Columbia National Award for Non-Fiction.

Di Cintio won the City of Calgary W. O. Mitchell Book Prize in 2012 for Walls: Travels Along the Barricades and, in 2018 for Pay No Heed to the Rockets: Palestine in the Present Tense, and in 2026 for Precarious: The Lives of Migrant Workers.

Driven: The Secret Lives of Taxi Drivers won the 2022 Bressani Literary Prize presented by The Association of Italian-Canadian Writers.

Di Cintio's books and magazine stories have won three Dave Greber Freelance Writers Awards, five Alberta literary Awards, a National Magazine award, and three Alberta Magazine Awards. His work has also been nominated for several other prizes.
