= Gloria Sawai =

American-born fiction author, based in Canada (1932 – 2011)

- Born: Gloria Ruth Ostrem; 20 December 1932; Minneapolis, Minnesota, U.S.
- Died: 20 July 2011 (aged 78); Edmonton, Alberta, Canada
- Occupation: Author
- Writing career
- Language: English
- Notable awards: Governor General's Literary

Gloria Sawai (20 December 1932 – 20 July 2011), born Gloria Ruth Ostrem in Minneapolis, Minnesota, was an American-born fiction author, based in Edmonton, Alberta, Canada. She died on 20 July 2011.

In early childhood, she moved with her family to Saskatchewan, then in her youth to Alberta. Her father was a Lutheran minister.

== Education ==
- 1948: Camrose Lutheran College (today the University of Alberta Augustana Faculty) (Camrose, Alberta).
  - October 2003: Received Distinguished Alumni Award
- 1953: Bachelor of Arts, Augsburg College (Minneapolis, Minnesota)
- 1977: Master of Fine Arts, University of Montana (Missoula, Montana)

== Awards and recognition ==
- fiction winner, Governor General's Award, A Song for Nettie Johnson, 2002
- Danuta Gleed Literary Award: A Song for Nettie Johnson, Coteau Books, for the year 2001

== Works ==
- 1983: contributor, Three Times Five: Short Stories (NeWest) ISBN 0-920316-84-0
- 2001: A Song for Nettie Johnson (Coteau) ISBN 1-55050-187-9
  - 2002 reissue: ISBN 1-55050-223-9
