= Fred Stenson (writer) =

Canadian writer (born 1951)

Frederick Stenson (born December 22, 1951) is a Canadian writer of historical fiction and nonfiction relating to the Canadian West.

His 2000 novel The Trade was shortlisted for Canada's Giller Prize. Both The Trade and his 2003 novel Lightning won the Grant MacEwan Author's Prize for best Alberta book of the year. His 2008 novel The Great Karoo was nominated for the 2008 Governor General's Literary Award in Fiction and was a nominee for the 2009 Commonwealth Writers Prize for Best Book (Canada/Caribbean).

In addition to his published work, Stenson has been a faculty member at The Banff Centre, where he has directed the Wired Writing Studio for eleven years. He is also a documentary film writer, with over 140 credits. He writes a regular wit column for Alberta Views Magazine.

Stenson was raised on a farm and cattle ranch in the Waterton region of southwest Alberta. He is married to the poet Pamela Banting and lives in Cochrane, Alberta. His son Ted is a film director, whose feature debut Events Transpiring Before, During and After a High School Basketball Game was released in 2020.

== Bibliography ==
- Lonesome Hero - 1974
- Rocky Mountain House - 1985
- Waste to Wealth - 1985
- Last One Home - 1988
- Working Without a Laugh Track - 1990
- The Story of Calgary - 1994
- Teeth - 1994
- RCMP: The March West - 1999
- The Last Stack - 2000
- The Trade - 2000
- Lightning - 2003
- Thing Feigned or Imagined - 2003
- The Great Karoo - 2008
- Who by Fire – 2014
