= Writers Guild of Alberta =

Canadian non-profit organization for writers

The Writers' Guild of Alberta (WGA) was founded in 1980 as a non-profit organization for writers based in Alberta, Canada. It claims to be the largest provincial writers' organization in Canada, representing approximately 1,000 writers throughout the province.

== Location and leadership ==
Its main office is based in Edmonton, with a southern office located in Calgary. The founding president was Rudy Wiebe. Past presidents include E. D. Blodgett, Joan Clark, Candas Jane Dorsey, Myrna Kostash, Alice Major, Suzette Mayr, George Melnyk, Darlene Quaife, Gloria Sawai, Fred Stenson (writer), Vern Thiessen and Aritha van Herk. A new president is nominated and elected at each year's AGM event. The president for the 2019–2021 year is Leslie Chivers.

== Programs ==
The WGA provides professional services and development to established and emerging writers through its annual conference, mentorship program, writing retreats and youth programs. Its quarterly publication is WestWord magazine.

== Awards ==
Created in 1982, the Alberta Literary Awards are awarded annually by the WGA to recognize and celebrate outstanding Alberta writing. They include the Robert Kroetsch City of Edmonton Book Prize and The City of Calgary W.O. Mitchell Book Prize, as well as awards for children's literature, fiction, nonfiction, poetry, drama, published short fiction and short nonfiction, and unpublished essays. The Golden Pen Lifetime Achievement Award acknowledges an outstanding Alberta writer. The 2019 recipient is Bob Stallworthy.

== See also ==
- List of writers from Alberta
