= George Melnyk =

Canadian historian (born 1946)

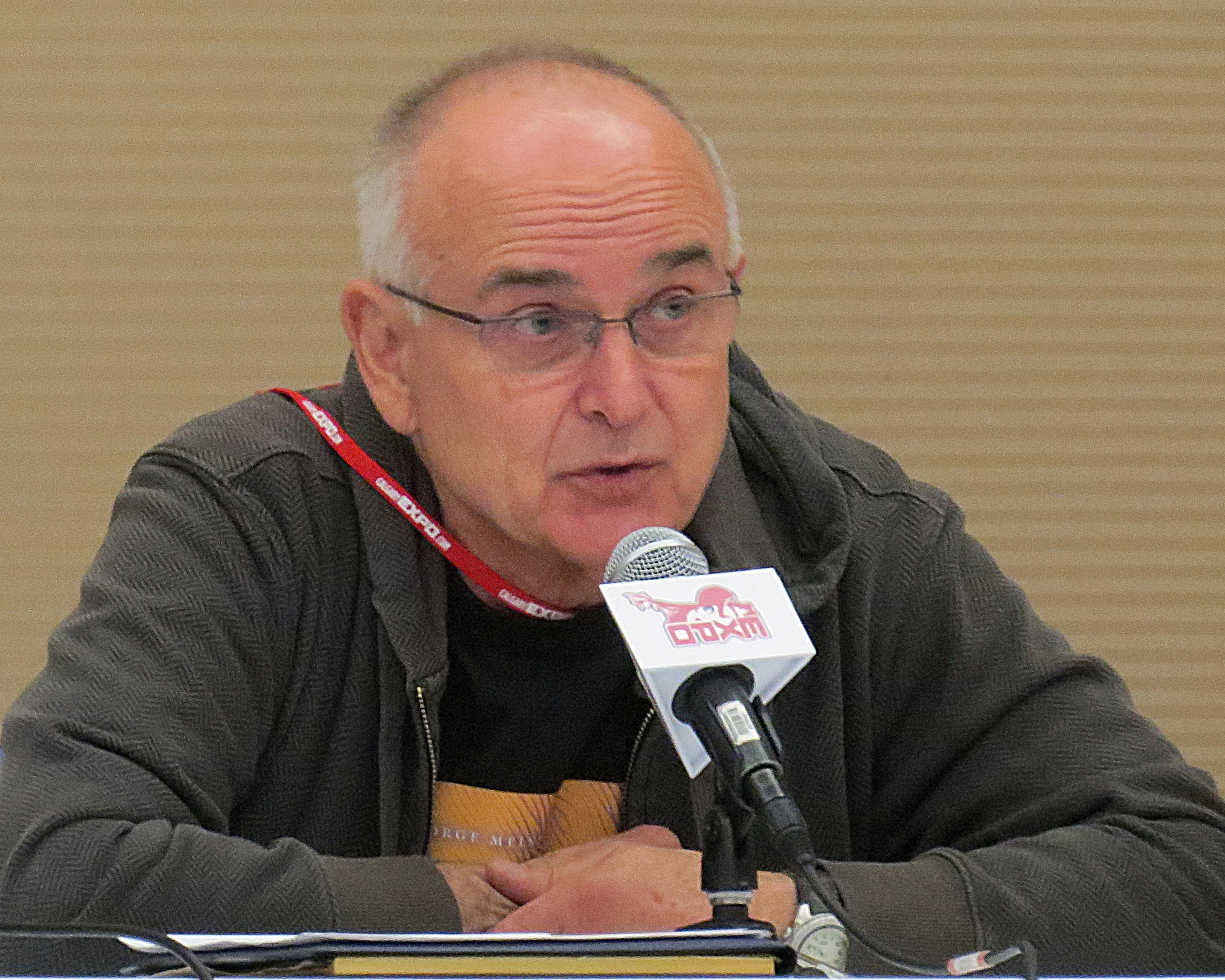
- Melnyk in 2014
- Born: George Roman Melnyk; 1946 (age 79–80)

Academic background
- Education: University of Manitoba; University of Chicago; University of Toronto

Academic work
- Discipline: Communication studies; history
- Sub-discipline: Cultural history
- Institutions: University of Calgary
- Website: georgemelnyk.com

George Roman Melnyk (born 1946) is a Canadian cultural historian. As of 2015 Melnyk is Professor Emeritus of Communication, Media and Film at the University of Calgary. He holds a Bachelor of Arts degree in history from the University of Manitoba, a Master of Arts degree in history from the University of Chicago, and a Master of Arts degree in philosophy from the University of Toronto. He is the author or editor of 30 books on Canadian Studies topics, including ONE HUNDRED YEARS OF CANADIAN CINEMA (2004) and FILM AND THE CITY (2014). His most recent books are WE ARE ONE: Poems from the Pandemic (Bayeux Arts 2020), FINDING REFUGE IN CANADA: NARRATIVES OF DISLOCATION (2021 Athabasca U Press) and his literary memoir BREAKING WORDS: A LITERARY CONFESSION (2021 Bayeux Arts).
