= List of writers from Newfoundland and Labrador =

The Canadian province of Newfoundland and Labrador has produced writers across a variety of genres. This list includes notable writers who were born in Newfoundland and Labrador or spent a significant portion of their writing career living in Newfoundland and Labrador.

== A ==
- Hugh Abercrombie Anderson (1890–1965)
- John Murray Anderson (1886–1954), screenwriter
- Edith Archibald (1854–1936)

== B ==
- Ken Babstock (born 1970), poet
- Sharon Bala (born 1979), novelist, short story writer
- George John Bond (1850–1933)
- Cassie Brown (1919–1986), journalist, short story writer
- Maggie Burton (living), poet

== C ==
- Tom Cahill (1929–2006), playwright
- William Roger Callahan (1931–2022), journalist
- Lydia Campbell (1818–1905), diarist
- Bridget Canning (living), novelist
- Perry Chafe (born 1969), screenwriter, novelist
- Robert Chafe (born 1971), playwright
- Anne Chislett (born 1942), playwright
- Bill Clark (born 1944), screenwriter
- Joan Clark (1934–2023), novelist, children's writer
- Ryan Cleary (born 1966), journalist
- Megan Gail Coles (living), novelist, short story writer
- Michael Cook (1933–1994), playwright
- Eva Crocker (living), novelist, short story writer
- Michael Crummey (born 1965), poet, novelist, short story writer
- John S. Currie (1877–1956), journalist

== D ==
- Mary Dalton (born 1950), poet
- Tom Dawe (born 1940), poet, children's writer, short story writer
- Sandra Djwa (born 1939), biographer
- M. T. Dohaney (born 1930), novelist, non-fiction writer, short story writer
- Magie Dominic (born 1944), poet, memoirist
- Stan Dragland (1942–2022), novelist, poet, literary critic
- Margaret Duley (1894–1968), novelist
- Stephen Dunn (born 1989), screenwriter
- Gwynne Dyer (born 1943), historian, journalist

== E ==
- David Elliott (1923–1999), poet
- Françoise Enguehard (born 1957), journalist

== F ==
- Ed Finn (1926–2020), journalist
- Deanne Foley (living), screenwriter
- David French (1939–2010), playwright

== G ==
- John Gallishaw (1891–1968)
- Shree Ghatage (born 1957), memoirist, short story writer
- Elizabeth Goudie (1902–1982)
- Jessica Grant (born 1972), novelist
- Richard Greene (born 1961), poet
- Ray Guy (1939–2013), journalist, humorist
- Sandra Gwyn (1935–2000), journalist, non-fiction writer

== H ==
- Michelle Butler Hallett (born 1971), novelist
- Maura Hanrahan (born 1963), non-fiction writer
- Michael Harrington, historian
- Peter Hart (1963–2010), historian
- Kenneth J. Harvey (born 1962), novelist, short story writer
- Robert Hayman (1575–1629), poet
- Jenny Higgins (living), novelist
- Holly Hogan (living), science writer, non-fiction writer
- Matthew Hollett (living), poet
- Harold Horwood (1923–2006), novelist, non-fiction writer
- Joel Thomas Hynes (born 1976), poet, playwright, novelist

== J ==
- Percy Janes (1922–1999), novelist, poet, short story writer
- Wayne Johnston (born 1958), novelist
- Andy Jones (born 1948), screenwriter, children's writer
- Michael Jones (1944–2018), screenwriter

== K ==
- Ed Kavanagh (born 1954), novelist

== L ==
- Sheilah Lukins (living), non-fiction writer, children's writer
- Karen Lynch (born 1967), novelist

== M ==
- William D. MacGillivray (born 1946), screenwriter
- Randall Maggs (living), poet
- Kevin Major (born 1949), novelist, poet, non-fiction writer
- Pasha Malla (living), novelist, short story writer
- Roger Maunder (living), screenwriter, novelist
- Maxim Mazumdar (1952–1988), playwright
- Carmelita McGrath (living), poet, novelist, children's writer
- Robin McGrath (born 1949), novelist, poet, short story writer
- Janet McNaughton (born 1953), novelist
- Phebe Florence Miller (1889–1979), poet, diarist
- Lisa Moore (born 1964), novelist, short story writer
- Bernice Morgan (born 1935), novelist, short story writer
- Isaac Chesley Morris (1857–1937)
- Donna Morrissey (born 1956), novelist
- Rex Murphy (1947–2024), journalist
- George Murray (born 1971), poet
- Hilda Chaulk Murray (born 1934), non-fiction writer

== N ==
- Wanda Nolan (living), screenwriter, short stories

== O ==
- Melanie Oates (living), novelist, screenwriter
- Robert O'Driscoll (1938–1996)
- Patrick O'Flaherty (1939–2017), historian
- Paul O'Neill (1921–2013), historian
- Lawrence O'Toole (living), journalist

== P ==
- Alexander A. Parsons (1847–1932), journalist
- Andrew Peacock (living), novelist
- Earl Pilgrim (1939–2025), novelist
- William Ping (living), novelist, short story writer
- Gordon Pinsent (1930–2023), screenwriter
- Al Pittman (1940–2001), poet, playwright, short story writer
- Helen Fogwill Porter (1930–2023), poet, novelist
- Michelle Porter (living), novelist
- Herbert Pottle (1907–2002), memoirist
- Craig Francis Power (living), novelist
- Greg Power (1909–1997), poet
- Paul David Power (living), playwright
- E. J. Pratt (1882–1964), poet
- Daniel Woodley Prowse (1834–1914), historian

== R ==
- Edward Riche (born 1961), screenwriter, novelist
- John A. Robinson (1867–1929), journalist
- Gordon Rodgers (born 1952), poet, novelist
- Bill Rowe (born 1942), journalist
- Dora Oake Russell (1912–1986), journalist, playwright, short story writer
- Ted Russell (1904–1977), playwright, short story writer

== S ==
- Diem Saunders (1992–2021)
- Gary Saunders (born 1935), non-fiction writer
- Arthur Scammell (1913–1995)
- Mary C. Sheppard (living), journalist, novelist
- Sue Sinclair (living), poet
- Christian Sparkes (living), screenwriter
- Reginald F. Sparkes (1906–1990)
- Berni Stapleton (living), non-fiction writer, playwright

== T ==
- Kenneth Tam (born 1984), science fiction writer
- Greg Thomey (born 1961), playwright
- Sara Tilley (living), novelist
- Maxine Trottier (born 1950), children's writer

== W ==
- Tracey Waddleton (born 1979), short story writer
- Michael Wade (1944–2004), poet, playwright
- Aimee Wall (living), novelist
- Agnes Walsh (born 1950), poet, playwright
- Russell Wangersky (living), journalist, non-fiction writer
- Patrick Warner (living), novelist, poet
- Shannon Webb-Campbell (living), poet
- Sherry White (living), screenwriter
- Naboth Winsor (1916–1997), historian
- Kathleen Winter (born 1960), novelist, short story writer
- Michael Winter (born 1965), novelist, short story writer
- Abel Wornell (1914–2004), poet
- Douglas E. Wright (born 1955), novelist

== See also ==
- Lists of Canadian writers
- List of writers from New Brunswick
- List of writers from Nova Scotia
- List of writers from Prince Edward Island
