= Newfoundland and Labrador Book Awards =

Award by the Writer's Alliance in Canada

The Newfoundland and Labrador Book Awards were established in 1997 by the Writer's Alliance of Newfoundland and Labrador (WANL), Canada. The awards are administered in partnership with the Literary Arts Foundation of Newfoundland and Labrador. The categories for the awards alternate on a bi-yearly basis, with fiction and children's/young adult literature being featured one year, and poetry and non-fiction being featured the next. The winner of each category receives a $1,500 prize. Two runners-up in each category are also selected and receive a $500 prize.

== Guidelines ==
The awards are open to residents of the province of Newfoundland and Labrador. For the administration of these awards, WANL defines residents as individuals who meet one of two conditions. The first condition is that they have lived in the province for 12 months immediately prior to the release of publication of their written piece. The second is that they have lived in the province for at least 36 out of the previous 60 months, with no requirement for those months to be consecutive. An award can also be won posthumously if one of the residency conditions were met. To be eligible, a book must be in English and authored by a single individual. Translated books, as well as those that are self-published, are eligible.

== Winners ==
| Year | Winner (Poetry) | Winner (Non-Fiction) | Winner (Children's/YA) | Winner (Fiction) |
|---|---|---|---|---|
| 1997 | Arguments with Gravity by Michael Crummey | Bread and Roses by Dorothy Inglis | N/A | N/A |
| 1998 | N/A | N/A | Dream Carvers by Joan Clark | Gaff Topsails by Patrick Kavanagh |
| 1999 | That Night We Were Ravenous by John Steffler | They Let Down Baskets by Berni Stapleton | N/A | N/A |
| 2000 | N/A | N/A | Make or Break Spring by Janet McNaughton | Stranger Things Have Happened by Carmelita McGrath |
| 2001 | Thirty-for-Sixty by Al Pittman | A Personal Calligraphy by Mary Pratt and Old Newfoundland: A History to 1843 by Patrick O'Flaherty | N/A | N/A |
| 2002 | N/A | N/A | The Secret Under My Skin by Janet McNaughton | The Confessions of Nipper Mooney by Ed Kavanagh |
| 2003 | Helix: New and Selected Poems by John Steffler | From the Ashes of My Dream by Ed Smith | N/A | N/A |
| 2004 | N/A | N/A | An Earthly Knight by Janet McNaughton | In the Chambers of the Sea by Susan Rendell |
| 2005 | Merrybegot by Mary Dalton | Aprocrypha: Further Journeys by Stan Dragland | N/A | N/A |
| 2006 | N/A | N/A | Brave Jack and the Unicorn by Janet McNaughton | An Audience of Chairs by Joan Clark |
| 2007 | There, there by Patrick Warner | Vikings to U-Boats: The German Experience in Newfoundland and Labrador by Gerhard P. Bassler | N/A | N/A |
| 2008 | N/A | N/A | The Raintree Rebellion by Janet McNaughton | Cloud of Bone by Bernice Morgan |
| 2009 | Night Work: the Sawchuk Poems by Randall Maggs | Burning Down the House: Fighting Fires and Losing Myself by Russel Wangersky | N/A | N/A |
| 2010 | N/A | N/A | Moocher in the Lun by Tom Lawe | Come, Thou Tortoise by Jessica Grant |
| 2011 | Mole by Patrick Warner | Island Maid: Voices of Outport Women by Rhonda Pelley | N/A | N/A |
| 2012 | N/A | N/A | Jack and the Manger by Andy Jones | Moonlight Sketches by Gerard Collins |
| 2013 | Paradoxides by Don McKay | In the Field by Joan Sullivan | N/A | N/A |
| 2014 | N/A | N/A | Jack and Mary in the Land of Thieves by Andy Jones | Caught by Lisa Moore |
| 2015 | Escape Velocity by Carmelita McGrath | Creatures of the Rock by Andrew Peacock | N/A | N/A |
| 2016 | N/A | N/A | Flame and Ashes: The Great Fire Diary of Triffie Winsor by Janet McNaughton | Sweetland by Michael Crummey |
| 2017 | Octopus by Patrick Warner | Newfoundland in the First World War by Jenny Higgins | N/A | N/A |
| 2018 | N/A | N/A | Full Speed Ahead: Errol's Bell Island Adventure by Sheilah Lukins | We'll All Be Burnt in Our Beds Some Night by Joel Thomas Hynes |
| 2019 | I'd Write the Sea Like a Parlour Game by Alison Dyer | Gerald Squires by Stan Dragland | N/A | N/A |
| 2020 | N/A | N/A | The Ghost Road by Charis Cotter | The Boat People by Sharon Bala |
| 2021 | Crow Gulch by Douglas Walbourne-Gough | A Long Journey: Residential Schools in Labrador and Newfoundland by Andrea Procter | N/A | N/A |
