= Fresh Fish Award =

Literary award in Newfoundland and Labrador, Canada

The Fresh Fish Award for Emerging Writers was established in 2006 by Brian O'Dea, an author from the province of Newfoundland and Labrador. The award supports emerging writers in Newfoundland and Labrador through financial and editing support, as well as recognition for their writing. The award is administered by the Writer's Alliance of Newfoundland and Labrador (WANL). Originally given out every year, the award became biennial in 2009. In 2011, NLCU - the largest credit union in Newfoundland and Labrador with a reputation for its commitment to local communities and organizations - became the corporate sponsor of the award, which is officially known as the NLCU Fresh Fish Award for Emerging Writers. Since its inception, the award has kick started the writing careers of many of its short-listed and winning writers, who were subsequently successful in having their works published.

== Prize ==
The winning author receives a cash prize of $5,200 and $1,000 towards professional editing services for the winning manuscript. Two runners-up receive a $1,000 cash prize each.

== Guidelines and Eligibility ==
In order to be eligible, an individual must be a member of WANL and a resident of the province of Newfoundland and Labrador. For the administration of these awards, WANL defines residents as individuals who meet one of two conditions. The first condition is that they have lived in the province for 12 months immediately prior to the release of publication of their written piece. The second is that they have lived in the province for at least 36 out of the previous 60 months, with no requirement for those months to be consecutive. The award cannot be received posthumously.

The submitted manuscript must be both completed and unpublished. It must be in English and authored by a single individual. Only one submission per writer per year is allowed, however pieces that have been submitted once before to the Fresh Fish Awards are eligible to be submitted again. The same piece cannot be submitted more than twice.

== Winners ==
Year	Book	Author	Runners-up
2006	Snowflake-Young (published as Skin Room)	Sara Tilley	The Forgetting Room by Degan Davis and Maxine and Other Stories by Claire Wilkshire
2007	Blood Relatives	Craig Francis Power	The Forgetting Room by Degan Davis and Firmament by Bruce Johnson
2008	It All Comes Down to This	Jamie Fitzpatrick	Preservations by Stephen Rowe and untitled novel by Claire Wilkshire
2009	West Orange	Dave Andrews	The Chrome Chair by Danielle Devereaux and sparrows, sparks by Andreae Prozesky
2011	Braco	Lesleyanne Ryan	Manigotagan by Patrick Carroll and How to Softly Break a Wild Horse by Scott Cowan
2013	Everything Is What It Is	Paul Whittle	The Art of Dogs by Joshua Goudie and Send More Tourists, the Last Ones Were Delicious by Tracey Waddleton
2015	Dispelling the Myths	Susie Taylor	The Boat People by Sharon Bala and Barrelling Forward and Other Stories by Eva Crocker
2017	Optic Nerve	Matthew Hollett	We All Do by Terry Doyle and Phreak by Liz Solo
2020	No Subject for the Inexperienced	Clay Everest	Nowadays and Lonelier by Camelia Gray-Cosgrove and The Blue Moth Motel by Olivia Anne Robinson
