= Edna Alford =

Canadian author and editor

Edna Alford (born 19 November 1947 in Turtleford, Saskatchewan) is a Canadian author and editor. She was a graduate of Adam Bowden Collegiate, Saskatoon, and got scholarships to attend the Saskatchewan Summer School of the Arts. Some of her teachers include; Jack Hodgins, W. P. Kinsella, Rudy Wiebe, and Robert Kroetsch. She majored in English at the University of Saskatchewan, and worked summers at hospitals and nursing homes for the chronically ill. As a writer she is known for the collections "A Sleep Full of Dreams and The Garden of Eloise Loon". She has also won the Marian Engel Award and the Gerald Lampert Award. As an editor she co-founded the magazine Dandelion and edited fiction for Grain from 1985–1990. Edna was born to George and Edith Sample and was the second eldest of the children aside from brother Stanley. She also has brothers Lorne (deceased) and Gregory as well as a younger sister Beth. Edna is currently married to internationally known theoretical mathematician Richard Cushman.

== Short fiction ==
Alford's first short story collection, A Sleep Full of Dreams, looks at the lives of residents and workers in Pine Mountain Lodge. Jeremy LaLonde describes Alford's collection as a narrative of community. "On a thematic level, what distinguishes A Sleep Full of Dreams from other narratives of community is that the community it portrays (a retirement home) has rarely been depicted in a sustained way or with such stark realism," LaLonde writes. He also calls the collection "exemplary in its use of imagistic links."

Reviewer M.G. Osachoff noted that through the collection, Alford shows readers "that there is beauty and dignity in growing old. Avoiding sentimentality, she gives us all the unsavory details about old age, and yet makes us care about the old women who are Aria's (sic) patients."

Alford's second collection, The Garden of Eloise Loon, deals with mental illness and apocalyptic themes. Most of the stories are set in rural Saskatchewan, and many of them in the Turtle Lake area. David Carpenter writes that Alford "usurps the quaint moderation that has been accorded to Saskatchewan by those who don't understand its hazardous otherness. The occupation of disaster, the story of loss, pain, and indignity, recites a quintessentially Saskatchewan moment of hesitation inlaid with the exaggerated tales the province incites."

== Other work ==
Alford is also a well-regarded literary editor. She co-edited several anthologies, including Meltwater, Rip-rap, and Intersections, published by the Banff Centre. She also edited Gloria Sawai's A Song for Nettie Johnson, which won the Governor General's Award for Fiction, along with short story collections by Bonnie Burnard, Fred Stenson and many others.

Alford also served as associate director of the Banff Centre's Writing Studio for over a decade. During that time, she mentored several award-winning writers, including Yann Martel and Lisa Moore. She also sat on Coteau Books' editorial board along with several literary juries such as the Canada Council, Saskatchewan Arts Board, and CBC's annual short story contest. In 1975, Alford, along with author Joan Clark and visual artist Velma Foster, founded Calgary's Dandelion Magazine.

== See also ==
- Canadian literature
- Canadian poetry
- List of Canadian poets
- List of Canadian writers
