= Newfoundland Quarterly =

Canadian literary magazine

- Cover of the Spring 2018 issue
- Founded: 1901
- Company: Memorial University of Newfoundland
- Country: Canada
- Based in: St. John's, Newfoundland and Labrador
- Language: English
- ISSN: 0380-5832
- OCLC: 1080361365

Newfoundland Quarterly is a literary magazine published by Memorial University of Newfoundland in St. John's, Newfoundland and Labrador, Canada. Having begun as "a literary magazine of interest to Newfoundlanders at home and abroad," Newfoundland Quarterly today calls itself "a cultural journal of Newfoundland and Labrador", and publishes articles on the province's culture and history, including biography, local history, book reviews, visual art and poetry. Founded in 1901, it is Canada's longest running magazine.

== History ==
Newfoundland Quarterly was founded in 1901 by John J. Evans, Senior, a printer and publisher in St. John's, Newfoundland and Labrador, who became its first editor. Patrick O'Flaherty, writing about the early years of the Quarterly in The Rock Observed: Studies in the Literature of Newfoundland, noted that "The dominant theme in the Quarterly was local history, but there were also excursions into biography, humour, poetry, and story-telling." In 1940 editorship was passed on to John Evans, Junior, who ran the magazine until it was briefly discontinued in December 1951. In 1953 Newfoundland Quarterly was purchased and resurrected by Lemuel Janes, also a printer by trade. He retired in 1965 and sold the magazine to Creative Printers and Publishers Ltd. In 1981, the magazine was sold to Memorial University of Newfoundland, its current publisher, for the sum of $1.

Joan Sullivan is the current managing editor of Newfoundland Quarterly.

== Notable Contributors ==
- Daniel Woodley Prowse
- Michael Francis Howley
- Henry LeMessurier
- Charles Cavendish Boyle
- Edward Morris, 1st Baron Morris
- Arthur Scammell
- Joey Smallwood
- Gregory J. Power
- Harold Horwood
- Tom Dawe
- Percy Janes
- Bernice Morgan
- Ted Russell
- Ray Guy
- Helen Parsons Shepherd
- Helen Fogwill Porter
- Mary Dalton
- Wallace Ryan
