= SS Newfoundland =

1872 cargo ship

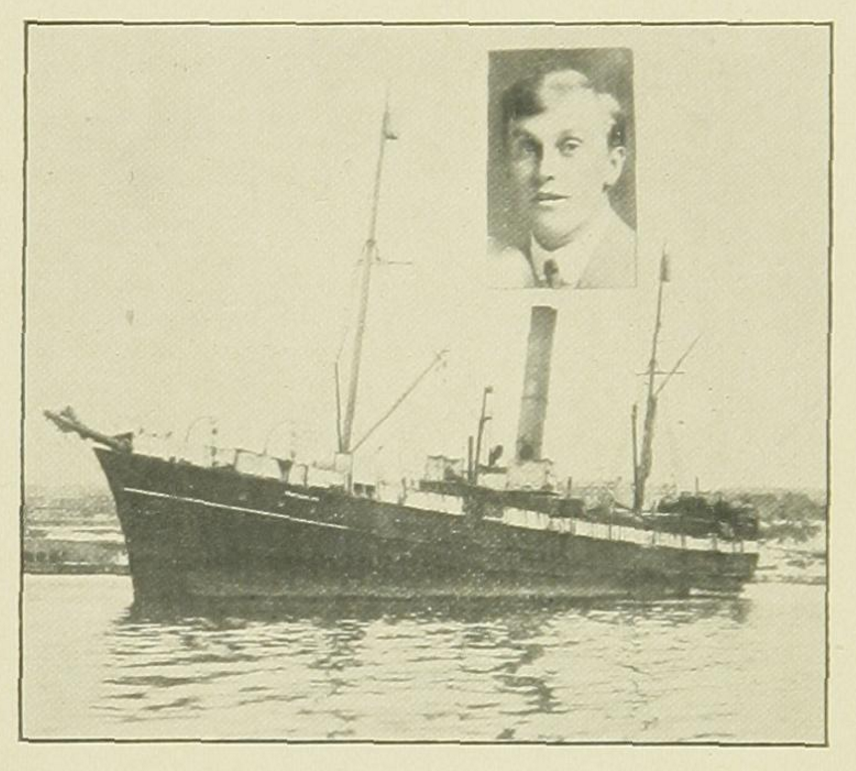
- Photograph of Newfoundland with inset portrait of Captain W Kean

History
- Name: 1872: Newfoundland; 1916: Samuel Blandford
- Namesake: 1872: Newfoundland
- Owner: 1873: J&A Allan; 1893: JH Anderson; 1900: JA Farquhar & Co; 1904: J Harvey; 1907: SS "Newfoundland" Sealing Co Ltd; 1916: William Davis
- Operator: 1907: AJ Harvey & Co
- Port of registry: 1873: (United Kingdom) Glasgow; 1890: (Canada) Montreal; 1893: (Canada) Windsor, NS; 1904: (Dominion of Newfoundland) St John's
- Builder: P Baldwin, Quebec
- Completed: 1872
- Identification: UK official number 66054; code letters MCPB; w/t call sign VOW
- Fate: Wrecked 1916

General characteristics
- Type: cargo ship, sealing ship
- Tonnage: 919 GRT, 568 NRT
- Length: 212.5 ft (64.8 m)
- Beam: 29.5 ft (9.0 m)
- Depth: 23.3 ft (7.1 m)
- Decks: 2
- Installed power: 1881: 130 HP; 1903: 162 NHP
- Propulsion: 1 × compound steam engine; 1 × screw
- Sail plan: brigantine

SS Newfoundland was a wooden-hulled brigantine and steamship that was built in 1872 and wrecked in 1916. She was a cargo ship, and for part of her career she was a sealing ship. In 1916 she was renamed Samuel Blandford.

Newfoundland was involved in two disasters. The first was the 1914 Newfoundland Sealing Disaster, when 132 sealers were stranded on an ice floe, resulting in 78 deaths. The second was in 1916, shortly after she had been renamed, when she struck rocks and was wrecked.

== Specifications ==
Peter Baldwin built Newfoundland in Quebec, completing her in 1872. Her registered length was 212.5 ft (64.8 m), her beam was 29.5 ft (9.0 m), her depth was 23.3 ft (7.1 m) and her tonnages were 919 GRT and 568 NRT. She had two masts and was rigged as a brigantine.

Newfoundland had a two-cylinder compound steam engine, built by the Ouseburn Engine Works of Newcastle upon Tyne, England, which powered her single screw. It was originally rated at "130 HP", but by 1903 it was rated at 162 NHP.

== Owners, managers and registration ==
James and Alexander Allan were Newfoundland's first owners. They registered her in Glasgow, Scotland. Her UK official number was 66054 and her code letters were MCPB.

In 1890 Allan Line re-registered Newfoundland in Montreal. In 1893 John H Anderson of Musquodoboit bought Newfoundland and re-registered her in Windsor, Nova Scotia. In 1900 JA Farquhar became her owner. In 1904 John Harvey bought her and re-registered her in St John's, Newfoundland. From 1907 her owner was the Steamship "Newfoundland" Sealing Co, Ltd, and AJ Harvey was her manager.

By 1913 Newfoundland was equipped for wireless telegraphy. Her call sign was VOW.

In 1916 William Davis of St John's, Newfoundland acquired Newfoundland, and she was renamed Samuel Blandford.

== 1914 disaster ==
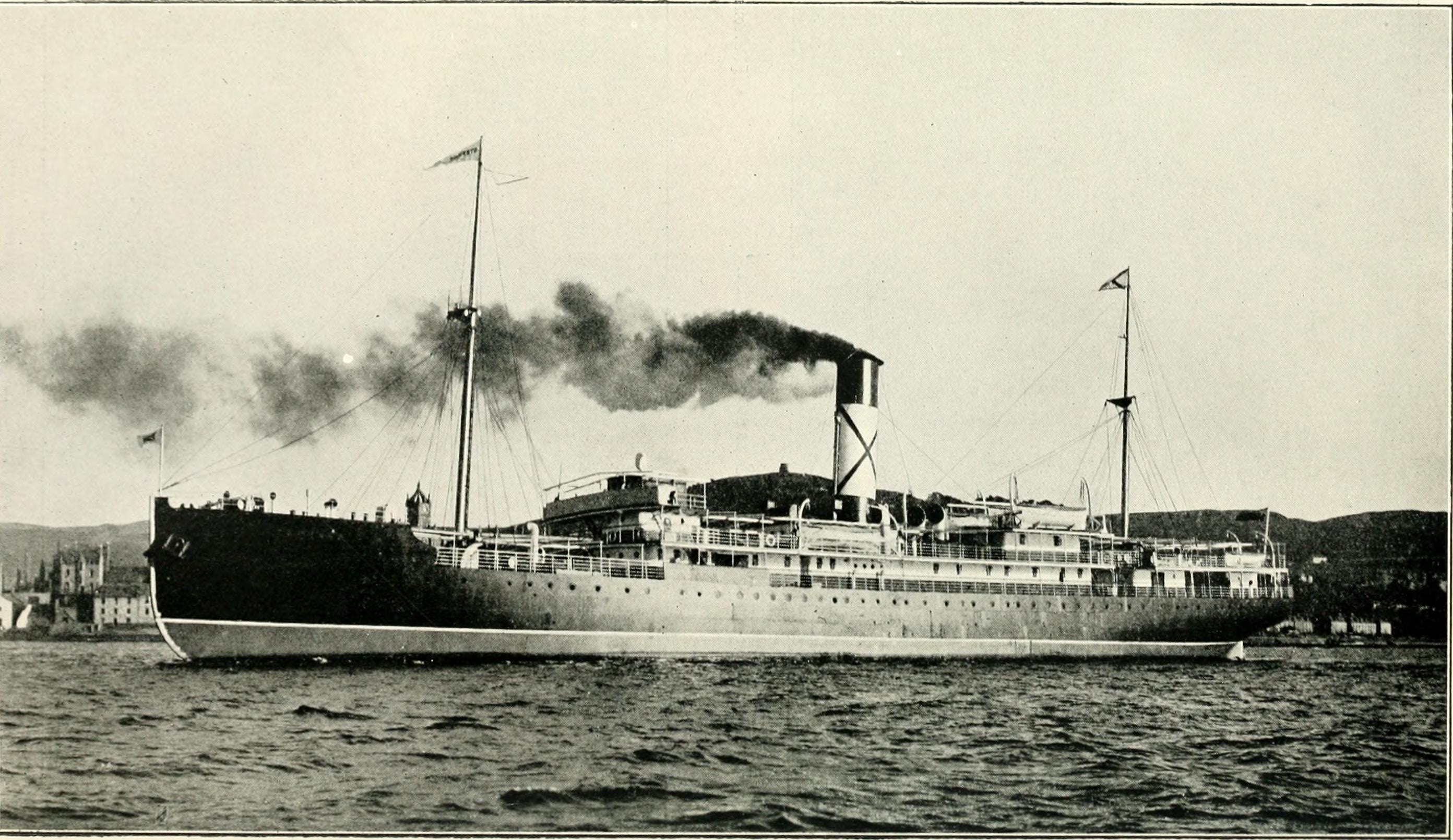
Stephano

On March 30, 1914, Newfoundland was trapped in ice off the northern coast of Newfoundland. Her captain, Wes Kean, could see signals from Stephano, commanded by his father Abram Kean, indicating that there were seals several miles away. The next morning, Wes Kean sent his crew in that direction across the ice to begin killing seals, commanded by his first officer, expecting that if the weather worsened they would stay overnight aboard Stephano. When the men reached Stephano, Abram Kean gave the men lunch and then ordered them back onto the ice to kill seals and find Newfoundland, despite signs of worsening weather.

As a storm began that afternoon, the captains of both Newfoundland and the nearby Stephano each thought the men were safely aboard the other man's vessel. Newfoundland's owners had removed the ship's wireless telegraph equipment because it was an expense that did not contribute to profits. Newfoundland's captain, believing the men were aboard Stephano, did not blow the ship's whistle to signal his location, which would have allowed his men to find the ship in the darkness and rain. The sealers endured two nights without shelter, in first a freezing rain storm and then a snowstorm.

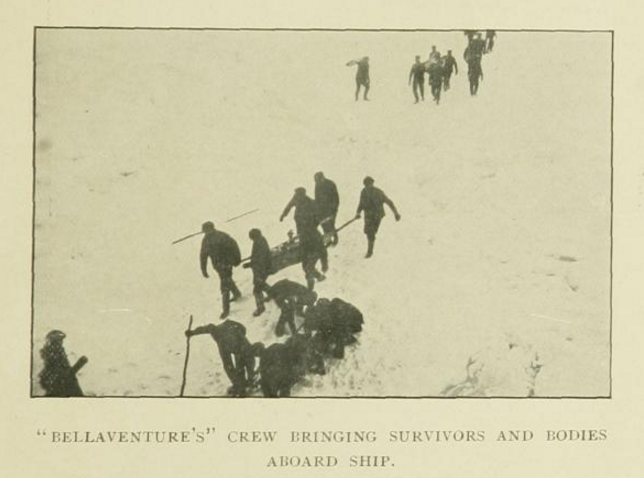
Carrying survivors and bodies to Bellaventure in 1914

The dead and survivors alike were rescued about 54 hours later by another ship in the fleet, Bellaventure, under Captain Isaac Randell. Of the 132 men aboard Newfoundland, 78 died, and many more were seriously injured. This disaster occurred in the same storm in which Southern Cross sank with all hands. The total loss from all three sealing ships totaled more than 250 lives, and the combined tragedy became known as the 1914 Newfoundland Sealing Disaster.

== 1916 loss ==
In 1916 Samuel Blandford left New York with a cargo of coal bound for St John's. On August 3 she struck the Keys, near St. Mary's Bay, Newfoundland and Labrador and was wrecked.

== Heritage ==
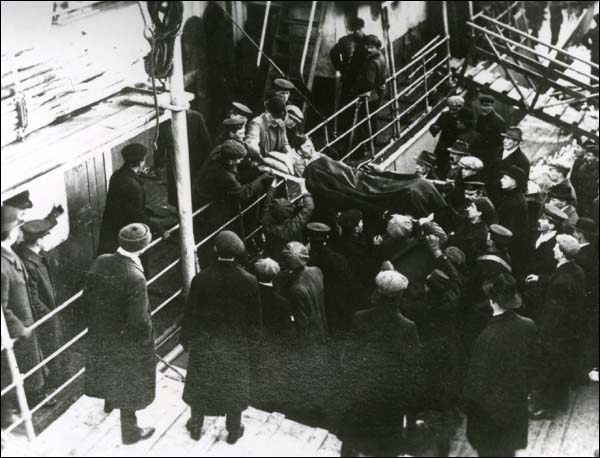
An injured survivor of the 1914 disaster being carried ashore from Bellaventure

Cassie Brown and Harold Horwood wrote their 1972 book Death on the Ice about the 1914 disaster. The National Film Board of Canada has made three documentaries about the disaster: The Icehunters in 1976, "I Just Didn't Want to Die": The 1914 Newfoundland Sealing Disaster in 1991, and the multimedia short 54 Hours in 2014.

== Bibliography ==
- Brown, Cassie; Horwood, Harold (1972). Death on the Ice: The Great Newfoundland Sealing Disaster of 1914. Toronto: Doubleday Canada. ISBN 978-0385050371.
- Lloyd's Register of British and Foreign Shipping. London: Lloyd's Register of Shipping. 1881 – via Internet Archive.
- "Steamers". Lloyd's Register of British and Foreign Shipping. London: Lloyd's Register of Shipping. 1894 – via Internet Archive.
- "Steamers". Lloyd's Register of British and Foreign Shipping. London: Lloyd's Register of Shipping. 1900 – via Internet Archive.
- "Steamers". Lloyd's Register of British and Foreign Shipping. London: Lloyd's Register of Shipping. 1904 – via Internet Archive.
- "Steamers". Lloyd's Register of British and Foreign Shipping. London: Lloyd's Register of Shipping. 1907 – via Internet Archive.
- "Steamers". Lloyd's Register of British and Foreign Shipping. London: Lloyd's Register of Shipping. 1913 – via Internet Archive.
- The Marconi Press Agency Ltd (1914). The Year Book of Wireless Telegraphy and Telephony. London: The Marconi Press Agency Ltd.
- Mercantile Navy List. London. 1874 – via Crew List Interest Project.
- Mercantile Navy List. London. 1890 – via Crew List Interest Project.
- Mercantile Navy List. London. 1916 – via Crew List Interest Project.
