= Dan Corcoran =

Daniel, Dan or Danny Corcoran may refer to:

== Sports ==
- Dan Corcoran (Gaelic footballer)
- Dan Corcoran (racing driver)
- Danny Corcoran (sports administrator)

== Other ==
- Danny Corcoran (ranger) (1916–1938), Newfoundland ranger who died on a solo expedition across the Great Northern Peninsula
