= Bridget Canning =

Canadian writer

Bridget Canning is a Canadian writer from Newfoundland and Labrador. Her first novel, The Greatest Hits of Wanda Jaynes (2017), was adapted into film in 2021. Her second novel, Some People's Children, was a contender for the 2021 N.L. Reads competition.

== Biography ==
Canning grew up in Highlands, Newfoundland and Labrador, and is based in St. John's.

Canning's first novel, The Greatest Hits of Wanda Jaynes (2017), follows a woman struggling with personal issues and problems with her career, with the story taking a dark turn when a shooter opens fire at a grocery store the protagonist is shopping at. Canning described her inspiration for the book as wanting to write about topics which invoke fear in her. The book was adapted into film by Marina Cordoni Entertainment and Rink Rat Productions in 2021.

Canning released her next book, What's Written in the Ladies, in 2018. The book is a collection of photographs of writing on the interior walls of stalls in public bathrooms, with some of the photographs accompanied by a short story using the photograph as a writing prompt.

Canning's second novel, Some People's Children, follows a teenaged girl growing up in rural Newfoundland. The book was well received by critics who praised its robust plot and Canning's smooth prose. The book was a contender for the 2021 N.L. Reads competition.

In 2022, Canning released her book No One Knows about Us, a collection of 16 short stories taking place in St. John's. The book explores themes of loneliness and substance abuse, with many of the characters portrayed as flawed and unlikeable. The final story in the book, Mindfull, is referred to as a novella and takes place in Toronto. The book was praised for its engaging and provocative plots. Her next book, Taking Down Names, is scheduled for a June 2026 release.

== Publications ==
=== Books ===
- — (2017). The Greatest Hits of Wanda Jaynes. St. John's, NL: Breakwater Books. ISBN 978-1-5508-1670-9. OCLC 988383560.
- — (2018). What's Written in the Ladies. Arts NL. OCLC 1089785011.
- — (2020). Some People's Children. St. John's, NL: Breakwater Books. ISBN 978-1-5508-1812-3. OCLC 1122914271.
- — (2022). No One Knows about Us. St. John's, NL: Breakwater Books. ISBN 978-1-5508-1950-2. OCLC 1353583003.
- — (2026). Taking Down Names. St. John's, NL: Breakwater Books. ISBN 978-1-7785-3091-3. OCLC 1550224031.

=== Selected articles ===
- Canning, Bridget (April 2017). "Writing Wanda Jaynes". The Newfoundland Quarterly. St. John's, NL: Memorial University of Newfoundland.
- — (11 November 2018). "Newfoundland and Labrador Considers How to Maintain its Romance". The Independent. St. John's, NL.
- — (1 December 2020). "The ArtsNL Awards are 35 years old. We're toasting our artists ... from a safe distance". CBC News. Newfoundland: Canadian Broadcasting Corporation.
- — (6 December 2020). "What's the future of the arts? The pandemic is giving us some clues". CBC News. Newfoundland: Canadian Broadcasting Corporation.
