= When Ponds Freeze Over =

- Directed by: Mary Lewis
- Written by: Mary Lewis
- Produced by: Mary Lewis
- Starring: Mary Lewis; Andy Jones; James Allodi; Eva Crocker
- Cinematography: Michael Jones
- Edited by: Mary Lewis; Derek Norman
- Music by: Matthew Glover; Mark Walker
- Release date: 1998
- Running time: 23 minutes
- Country: Canada
- Language: English

When Ponds Freeze Over is a Canadian short film, directed by Mary Lewis and released in 1998.

Mixing live action with animation, the film stars Lewis herself as Mary, a woman recounting to her daughter Eva (Eva Crocker) the childhood story of when Mary and her father (James Allodi) fell through the ice on a frozen pond.

The animated segments were created by Lewis, Peter Evans, Shelley Cornick and Lisa Moore.

== Accolades ==
The film won the Toronto International Film Festival Award for Best Canadian Short Film at the 1998 Toronto International Film Festival, and the Genie Award for Best Live Action Short Drama at the 19th Genie Awards.
