= Dandelion Magazine =

Canadian literary magazine

- Categories: Literary
- Frequency: Biannual
- Founder: Joan Clark; Edna Alford
- First issue: 1975; 51 years ago
- Final issue Number: 2011; 15 years ago Vol 37 No 1
- Company: Dandelion Artists' Cooperative
- Country: Canada
- Based in: Calgary
- Language: English
- ISSN: 0383-9575
- OCLC: 15234199

Dandelion Magazine was an independent literary magazine published in Calgary, Alberta between 1975 and 2011. In its day, according to The Literary History of Alberta, it was considered Alberta’s leading literary magazine. It started as an annual publication and then became biannual. Over the years, Dandelion featured fiction, poetry, visual art and reviews. Contributors consisted of emerging and established Canadian authors including Joan Clark, Edna Alford, Carol Shields, Robert Hilles, W. P. Kinsella, Robert Kroetsch, Guy Vanderhaeghe, Aritha van Herk, and Karen Connelly, among others.

Facing financial and operational difficulties in the late 1990s, the magazine moved to the University of Calgary Department of English where it was rebranded as dANDelion and published by a series of editorial collectives and faculty advisors until 2011.

== History ==
=== 1970s ===
Dandelion Magazine was the brainchild of then Calgary-based writers Joan Clark and Edna Alford. In the early 1970s, they were participants in a writers' workshop at the University of Calgary led by poet and faculty member Christopher Wiseman. During coffee breaks, they talked about starting a literary magazine where emerging Alberta writers could publish their work.

The first issue was produced in the summer of 1975 at the Dandelion Artists’ Cooperative located at the historic Deane House in Calgary’s Inglewood neighbourhood. Early editions were typewritten, stapled chapbooks with cardstock covers featuring a silkscreened dandelion flower by visual artist Velma Foster. For the first four years, the editors used their own personal funds to publish the annual magazine. Each edition of the magazine was launched at a public event in various locations around Calgary, including the Deane House.

The emergence of Dandelion Magazine was part of a decade that literary critic Bruce Meyer called "a period of intense literary activity in Canada." In the 1970s, there were "more active writers than at any other time in Canadian history, and there were more magazines available to publish their work than ever before."

In 1978, the magazine listed an editorial advisory board composed of Christopher Wiseman, Robert Kroetsch, Eli Mandel and Velma Foster. In later editions, W. P. Kinsella, Joan Clark, Edna Alford and Dale Fehr were added to the masthead.

The City of Calgary closed the Dandelion Artists’ Cooperative in 1978 to turn the Deane House into a restaurant and teahouse. The magazine borrowed space at the Alexandra Centre nearby, eventually establishing a business office there. In 1979, the Dandelion Magazine Society was incorporated in the Province of Alberta.

=== 1980s ===
By 1980, Dandelion—Calgary’s only literary magazine—was receiving funding from arts agencies in Calgary and Alberta.

In 1981, it began publishing twice a year. In 1982, the editors of launched blue buffalo, at first as a supplement and then as an independent publication under the auspices of the Dandelion Magazine Society. The biannual literary magazine called itself “a magazine of recent Alberta writing” and published the work of both new and established writers. Its first editorial collective consisted of Calgary poets Claire Harris, Robert Hilles and Murdoch Burnett.

In 1989 (Vol. 16, No. 1), the magazine featured a special section devoted to Alberta poetry. Calgary Herald books editor Ken McGoogan noted that “a partial listing of contributors reads almost like a who's who of this province's poets"

=== 1990s ===
In 1996, the magazine’s offices moved to the Old Y in the Beltline neighbourhood. In this decade, Dandelion was listed in the Oxford Companion to Canadian Literature as one of the "notable" independent literary magazines operating in Canada. In 1998, it celebrated its 25th anniversary with a celebration and fundraiser. Shortly after, the magazine folded due to financial pressures and other circumstances. In February 1999, Calgary writers staged a “wake” for Dandelion at the Hop in Brew pub in Calgary's Beltline.

In 1999, Aritha van Herk and Fred Wah, faculty members in the University of Calgary’s English Department resurrected the magazine as dANDelion. Its new organizational structure featured an editorial collective run by University of Calgary graduate students and overseen by a faculty advisor.

=== 2000s ===
During the 2000s, several special issues were published. In 2003, the magazine published an edition featuring the work of poet and visual artist Roy Kiyooka. In 2004, the “Disaster!” edition edited by Calgary poet Jill Hartman focused on the Kelowna, BC forest fires in a joint project with Calgary’s Truck Gallery. In 2007, the “Radical Translation” issue featured the work of Quebec poet Nicole Brossard. In 2011, “The Mapping Issue” was the final issue of the magazine, guest edited by Montreal writer and translator Oana Avasilichioaei and managing editor Kathleen Brown.

In April 2019, founding editors Joan Clark, Edna Alford and Velma Foster were honoured at a celebration held at the Deane House for their contributions to Calgary’s literary heritage.

=== Editors ===
Dandelion Magazine (1975-1999) literary editors have included: Joan Clark, Edna Alford, Christopher Wiseman, Gloria Sawai, Robert Hilles, Claire Harris, Cecelia Frey, Mark Anthony Jarman, Fred Stenson, Cornelia Hoogland, Nancy Holmes, Adele Megann, Yvonne Trainer and Allan Serafino.

Dandelion visual arts editors (1975-1999) included: Velma Foster, Dale Fehr, Russ Brocklehurst, Dianne Bersea, Patricia Olynyk, John K. Esler, and Alice Simmons.

dANDelion (2000-2011) managing editors included: Emily Cargan, Anne Sorbie, derek beaulieu, Jill Hartman and Oana Avasilichioaei. University of Calgary faculty advisors included Aritha van Herk, Fred Wah, Nicole Markotic, Suzette Mayr, Christian Bök and Tom Wayman.
