= Waddleton =

Waddleton is a Cornish surname. Notable people with the surname include:

- Ethan Waddleton (born 1996), English rugby union player
- Tracey Waddleton (born 1979), Canadian writer
