= Al Pittman =

Canadian poet and writer

- Born: Al Pittman; April 11, 1940; St. Leonard's, Newfoundland
- Died: August 26, 2001 (aged 61); Corner Brook, Newfoundland and Labrador
- Citizenship: British subject (1940–1949) Canadian citizenship (1949–2001)
- Education: St. Thomas University
- Occupations: Writer, Teacher
- Writing career
- Language: English
- Notable awards: Borestone Mountain Poetry Award; Canada Council Arts Award; Stephen Leacock Centennial Award; Newfoundland and Labrador Book Award for Poetry; Lydia Campbell Award for Creative Writing

Al Pittman (April 11, 1940 – August 26, 2001) was a Canadian writer and teacher from Newfoundland.

== Life and work ==
Born in St. Leonard's, Placentia Bay, Newfoundland, Pittman grew up in Corner Brook. He moved to Montreal in 1964 where he began writing poetry and plays, and in 1966 published his first book of poems, The Elusive Resurrection. While in Montreal he was associated with Raymond Fraser and others in editing the literary magazine Intercourse: Contemporary Canadian Writing. From 1968 to 1970, Pittman was a student at St. Thomas University in Fredericton, New Brunswick, where he befriended fellow poet Alden Nowlan. Pittman moved to St. John's in 1972, where he associated with many of the artists, writers, and musicians active in the city at the time, including Rufus Guinchard and Gerald Squires. In 1973 he co-founded Newfoundland's first publishing house, Breakwater Books, with Pat Byrne, Dick Buehler, Tom Dawe, and Clyde Rose. Pittman continued to write throughout his life, producing many other volumes of poetry, plays, books for children, short stories, songs, magazine articles, and essays, as well as writings for radio, television and film. He eventually returned to his childhood home of Corner Brook, where he co-founded the March Hare, an annual poetry and music festival.

Pittman's poetry and plays often address the sense of loss associated with the rural resettlement policies initiated by Joey Smallwood's provincial government in the 1960s. His best-known play West Moon is set in a resettled outport, where the ghosts of the dead lament the abandonment of their home. A production of West Moon produced by West Moon Inc. toured Ireland in 2001 following Al Pittman's 2000 visit where he met Poet Irish Paul Durcan in Dublin, read at the Canadian Embassy, stayed and also read at the Tyrone Guthrie Center, Annaghmakerring, County Monaghan. A strong sense of community and a writing style intended for reading aloud have helped to cement Pittman's reputation as one of Newfoundland and Labrador's most cherished contemporary writers.

Pittman died on August 26, 2001, at the age of sixty-one, after a lengthy illness. His work has been recognized with many awards, including a Borestone Mountain Poetry Award, The Canada Council Arts Award, the Stephen Leacock Centennial Award, and the Newfoundland and Labrador Book Award for Poetry. Pittman was the first recipient of the Newfoundland and Labrador Arts Council's Lydia Campbell Award for Creative Writing in 1985, and was inducted into the Arts Council's Hall of Honour in 1999. Up until his death he was a Writer in Residence at Sir Wilfred Grenfell College in Corner Brook, Newfoundland.

== Bibliography ==
The cover of An Island In The Sky: Selected Poetry of Al Pittman.

=== Poetry ===
- The Elusive Resurrection (1966)
- Seaweed and Rosaries (1968)
- Through One More Window (1974)
- Once When I Was Drowning (1978)
- Dancing in Limbo (1993)
- Thirty-for-Sixty (1999)
- An Island in the Sky: Selected Poetry of Al Pittman (2003)
- Al Pittman: Collected Poems (2015)

=== Plays ===
- A Rope Against the Sun (first performed in 1970, published 1974)
- West Moon (first performed in 1980, published 1995)

=== Short stories ===
- The Boughwolfen and Other Stories (1984)

=== Children's literature ===
- Down by Jim Long's Stage: Rhymes for Children and Young Fish (1976)
- One Wonderful Fine Day for a Sculpin Named Sam (1983)
- On a Wing and a Wish: Salt Water Bird Rhymes (1992)
