= List of writers from Prince Edward Island =

The Canadian province of Prince Edward Island has produced writers across a variety of genres. This list includes notable writers who were born in Prince Edward Island or spent a significant portion of their writing career living in Prince Edward Island.

== A ==
- Milton Acorn (1923–1986), poet, playwright

== B ==
- Alexander Charles Bertram (1852–1908), journalist
- Gilbert Buote (1833–1904), novelist

== C ==
- Lucy Gertrude Clarkin (1876–1947), poet
- Anne Compton (born 1947), poet
- Valerie Compton (born 1963), journalist, novelist, short story writer

== D ==
- Anita Daher (living), novelist, children's writer
- Tanya Davis (living), poet
- Katherine Dewar (1943–2026), historian

== F ==
- Elmer Ferguson (1885–1972), sports journalist

== G ==
- Melvin Gallant (1932–2023), poet, novelist, literary critic
- Ken Garnhum (living), playwright

== H ==
- Tyler Hellard (living), novelist
- David Helwig (1938–2018), essayist, memoirist, novelist, poet, short story writer
- Nicholas Herring (living), novelist
- Douglas Smith Huyghue (1816–1891), poet, essayist

== I ==
- Bud Ings (1926–2015), memoirist

== J ==
- Ronalda Jones (living), screenwriter

== K ==
- Basil King (1859–1928), novelist, non-fiction writer

== L ==
- Jeremy Larter (living), screenwriter
- Patrick Ledwell (living), humorist
- Richard Lemm (born 1946), poet
- Troy Little (born 1973), comics writer

== M ==
- Amber MacArthur (born 1976), journalist, non-fiction writer
- Edward MacDonald (living), historian
- Elizabeth Lee Owen Macdonald (1835–1901)
- Shane MacDougall (living), screenwriter
- Jed MacKay (living), comics writer
- Cyrus Macmillan (1878–1953), non-fiction writer, folklorist
- Andrew Macphail (1864–1938), novelist, essayist
- Heath MacQuarrie (1919–2002), non-fiction writer
- Edgar McInnis (1899–1973), poet, historian
- Judi McLeod (born 1944), journalist
- Steve McOrmond (living), poet
- Sarah Newcomb Merrick (1844–1922), non-fiction writer
- Lucy Maud Montgomery (1874–1942), novelist, essayist, poet, short story writer

== R ==
- James Jeffrey Roche (1847–1908), poet, journalist

== S ==
- Michael Smith (born 1966), cookbook writer
- Kent Stetson (born 1948), playwright, novelist
- Mark Strand (1934–2014), poet, essayist

== T ==
- Paul Thompson (born 1940), playwright
- Brian Tracy (living)

== W ==
- Wendy Walsh (born 1962), journalist, non-fiction writer
- David Weale (born 1942), historian, non-fiction writer, children's writer
- Norman Webster (1941–2021), journalist
- Zachariah Wells (born 1976), poet, essayist

== See also ==
- Lists of Canadian writers
- List of writers from New Brunswick
- List of writers from Newfoundland and Labrador
- List of writers from Nova Scotia
