= Ed Smith (writer) =

Canadian writer

Ed Smith was a Canadian writer who resided in Newfoundland and Labrador, Canada. Along with writing, he was also an educator, teaching in schools across the province. His book From the Ashes of My Dreams won the 2003 Newfoundland Book Award for Non-Fiction. He died on September 8, 2017.

== Life ==
Smith settled in Springdale, Newfoundland with his wife, Marian, and lived there until his death. In 1980, he began writing a humour column called "The View From Here", which has now appeared in six papers and magazines. He also wrote for the Toronto Star and the Reader's Digest. He retired from his career in education in 1996. Over two years later, Smith was paralyzed from the shoulders down due to a car accident. In 2001, Smith created a series of short radio clips about living with quadriplegia for CBC radio. For the series, he won the Gabriel Award for "writing that upholds and lifts the human spirit" and The Canadian Nurses Award for excellence in broadcasting. Five collections of Smith's columns have been published.

== Works ==
- Some Fine Times! (1991)
- Never Flirt With Your Eyes Open (1995)
- Fish 'n' Ships: A Brief Twisted History of Newfoundland...Sort of (1997)
- From the Ashes of My Dreams (2002)
- You Might as Well Laugh (2004)
- The Seventh Day (2007)
- A Spoonful of Sugar (2010)

== Awards ==
- 2001 Gabriel Award
- 2001 Canadian Nurses' Award
- 2003 Newfoundland Book Award for Non-Fiction for From the Ashes of My Dreams
- Nominated for the Stephen Leacock Award for Humour
