= Percy Janes First Novel Award =

The Percy Janes First Novel Award is a Canadian literary award, presented through the provincial government's annual Arts and Letters Competition to an unpublished manuscript by a first-time novelist from Newfoundland and Labrador. The award is named for the late Newfoundland writer Percy Janes. The award comes with a cash prize, originally $1,500 and raised to $2,500 in 2014.

== Winners ==
- 2000 – Tom Moore, Ghost World
- 2001 – Gerard Collins, Finton Moon
- 2002 – Oral Mews, I Have a Solution for the Woman with Slugs
- 2003 – Joel Thomas Hynes, Down to the Dirt
- 2004 – Sara Tilley, Skin Room
- 2005 – Jeff Rose, Game Misconduct
- 2006 – David B. Hickey, A Cappella
- 2007 – Degan Davis, The Forgetting Room
- 2008 – Craig Francis Power, Blood Relatives
- 2009 – Patrick Warner, Precious
- 2010 – Melanie Oates, Hanging from the Ceiling
- 2011 – Lee Burton, Raw Flesh in the Rising
- 2012 – Scott Bartlett, Taking Stock
- 2013 – Mary Pike, Never-Ever-Land
- 2014 – Susan Sinnott, Just Like Always
- 2015 – Sharon Bala, The Boat People
- 2016 – Devin Lee, Waking Ambrose
- 2017 – Terry Doyle, Union
- 2018 – Willow Kean, Our Impossible Forever
- 2019 – Susan Flanagan, Supermarket Baby
- 2020 – Alex Saunders, Safe in a Dangerous Place: kamatsiagit ulugianattumi
- 2021 – Josh Goudie, The Last Portrait
- 2022 – Dane Gill, Anson in Antarctica
- 2023 – Malcolm Kempt, Nightfall
- 2024 – Sabrina Pinksen, Those Who Stayed
- 2025 – Nina Pye, Labrador Patella
