= Dorothy Inglis =

Canadian feminist and author (1926–2013)

Undated image of Inglis

Dorothy Inglis (née Greer; 15 April 1926 – 22 May 2013) was a Canadian feminist, activist and author born in Calgary, Alberta, and raised in Vancouver, British Columbia. She spent most of her adulthood in Newfoundland.

== Political roles ==
Inglis was active in advocating for women's rights. She was a founding member of St. John's Status of Women Council and the Newfoundland Status of Women Council, and served on the National Action Committee on the Status of Women from 1982 until 1986, acting as vice-president from 1984. In 1988, she represented Canadian Voice of Women for Peace as a delegate to the 1988 Conference on Disarmament. She also had leadership roles in the Newfoundland and Labrador New Democratic Party.

For eight years, she wrote the feminist column for The Telegram in St. John's. In 1996, Killick Press published a selection of 58 of her columns in a volume titled Bread and Roses. It was awarded the Evelyn Richardson Memorial Literary Award in 1997.

A vocal opponent of pornography, Inglis was concerned that material she had seen as "innocent titillation" in the 1950s had become disturbingly graphic by the 1980s.

== Honours ==
Inglis was honoured with a Governor General's Persons Award and a doctor of laws degree from Memorial University.

== Personal life ==
She was married to Gordon Inglis and died in Vancouver on 22 May 2013.
