= Winterset Award =

The Winterset Award is a Canadian literary award, presented annually by the Newfoundland and Labrador Arts Council to a work judged to be the best book, regardless of genre, published by a writer from Newfoundland and Labrador.

The award was created by journalist and historian Richard Gwyn in memory of his wife Sandra following her death in 2000. Winterset was the name of Sandra Gwyn's childhood home in St. John's.

In 2025, to mark the award's 25th anniversary it presented separate awards for fiction and non-fiction, but returned to presenting a single award the following year.

== Winners ==
- 2000 - Michael Winter, This All Happened
- 2001 - Michael Crummey, The River Thieves
- 2002 - Joan Clark, The Word for Home
- 2003 - Robert Mellin, Tilting
- 2004 - Edward Riche, The Nine Planets
- 2005 - Joan Clark, An Audience of Chairs
- 2006 - Kenneth J. Harvey, Inside
- 2007 - Kathleen Winter, boYs
- 2008 - Randall Maggs, Night Work: The Sawchuk Poems
- 2009 - Jessica Grant, Come, Thou Tortoise
- 2010 - Russell Wangersky, The Glass Harmonica
- 2011 - Don McKay, The Shell of the Tortoise
- 2012 - Andy Jones, Jack & Mary in the Land of Thieves
- 2013 - Paul Bowdring, The Strangers' Gallery
- 2014 - Megan Gail Coles, Eating Habits of the Chronically Lonesome
- 2015 - Sara Tilley, Duke
- 2016 - Paul Rowe, The Last Half of the Year
- 2017 - Joel Thomas Hynes, We'll All Be Burnt in Our Beds Some Night
- 2018 - Heather Smith, Ebb & Flow
- 2019 - Megan Gail Coles, Small Game Hunting at the Local Coward Gun Club
- 2020 - Eva Crocker, All I Ask
- 2021 - Carmella Gray-Cosgrove, Nowadays and Lonelier
- 2022 - Shelly Kawaja, The Raw Light of Morning
- 2023 - Holly Hogan, Message in a Bottle: Ocean Dispatches from a Seabird Biologist
- 2024, Fiction: Susie Taylor, Vigil
- 2024, Non-fiction: Lisa Moore and Jack Whalen, Invisible Prisons
- 2025 - Angela Antle, The Saltbox Olive
