= Gerhard P. Bassler =

German-Canadian writer and professor (1937–2023)

Gerhard P. Bassler (June 2, 1937 – March 26, 2023) was a German-Canadian writer and professor. He was a specialist in German and Canadian migration history. His book Vikings to U-Boats: the German Experience in Newfoundland and Labrador won the Rogers Cable Non-Fiction Award, which is a part of the Newfoundland Book Awards.

Bassler died on March 26, 2023 in St. John's, Newfoundland at the age of 85.

== Life ==
Bassler was born in Stuttgart, Germany in 1937. He earned a Ph.D in European and American history from the University of Kansas. He emigrated to Newfoundland in 1965. Bassler was a professor of history at the Memorial University of Newfoundland from 1965 to 2002. He became a professor emeritus at the Memorial University in 2003.

== Works ==
- The German Canadians 1750-1937: Immigration, Settlement, and Culture (1986)
- The German Canadian Mosaic Today and Yesterday: Identities, Roots, and Heritage (1991)
- Sanctuary Denied: Refugees from the Third Reich and Newfoundland Immigration Policy 1906-1949 (1992)
- Alfred Valdmanis and the Politics of Survival (2000)
- Vikings to U-Boats: the German Experience in Newfoundland and Labrador (2006)
- Escape Hatch: Newfoundland's Quest for German Industry and Immigration, 1950-1970 (2017)
- Develop or Perish (2017)

== Awards ==
- 2007 Newfoundland and Labrador Book Award for Vikings to U-Boats: the German Experience in Newfoundland and Labrador
- Shortlisted for the 2018 Heritage and History Book Award for Escape Hatch: Newfoundland's Quest for German Industry and Immigration
