= The Hand of Robin Squires =

- First edition (publ. Clarke, Irwin & Company)
- Author: Joan Clark
- Language: English
- Publication date: 1977

The Hand of Robin Squires is a 1977 historical adventure novel written by Joan Clark, and published by Clarke, Irwin & Company.

== Plot ==
The story takes place in 1703 and is linked to finds in the alleged Money Pit on Oak Island off the coast of Nova Scotia. When his father, Charles, dies after coming back from America, Robin Squires agrees to join his uncle and help him build an underground complex of tunnels, and assemble a pump that his father had invented. Once he has left England he quickly discovers that his uncle is a pirate, seeking to hide his treasure. Robin, and a captured member of the Mi'kmaq, Actaudin, who has become his friend, are forced to build along with his uncle's black slaves. In the end Robin was chained by a wristlock, and his Uncle had ordered his first mate to murder him after his job was complete because they wanted no loose ends, it was Actaudin who came back to rescue Robin. He uses an axe to cut off Robin's hand to remove the lock. Billy Boles (the first mate) pursued them into the wilderness and was mauled by a bear. Robin goes to Boston to pay his passage for England and meets an old sailor who tells him how the Queen's Privateer (The ship they traveled on) went down in a storm.
