= Cassie Brown =

Author from Newfoundland (1919-1986)

Cassie Eileen Brown (January 10, 1919 – December 30, 1986) was a Newfoundland and Labrador journalist, author, publisher and editor. Brown is most distinguished for her books Death on the Ice, which was featured in Reader's Digest, and The Wreck of the Florizel.

== Early life and education ==
Brown was born in Rose Blanche, Newfoundland, to Wilson and Caroline (Hillier) Horwood. Her early education took place in Rose Blanche, St. Georges, and, later, in St. John's after her family moved there when she was eleven years old. In St. John's, Brown's father worked as a freelance broadcaster and her mother as a teacher and entrepreneur. The tourist resort, "Karwood", established by Caroline Horwood on the outskirts of St. John's, would eventually become Brown's writing retreat.

== Career ==
Brown started writing when she was a teenager, beginning with newspaper articles. Later, her work expanded to include freelance script-writing and educational broadcasts for CBC. She gained recognition in the 1950s when her short stories and radio dramatizations won five Newfoundland and Labrador Arts and Letters Awards. She was a reporter for The Daily News of St. John's from 1959 to 1966 and publisher of the magazine Newfoundland Women from 1961 to 1964.

Brown was elected to the executive of the Newfoundland Drama Society and made an honorary life member. She was also President of Karwood Limited, a real estate development company from Mt. Pearl.

== Bibliography ==
- Death on the Ice: The Great Newfoundland Sealing Disaster of 1914 (1974) ISBN 0-385-25179-3, foreword by Harold Horwood
- A Winter's Tale: The Wreck of the Florizel (1976) ISBN 0-9698767-4-2
- Standing Into Danger (1979) ISBN 1-894463-02-1
- The Caribou Disaster and Other Short Stories (1996) ISBN 0-9698767-3-4
- Writing the Sea (2005) ISBN 1-894463-74-9

== Adaptations ==
In 2011, an unabridged audiobook edition of Death on the Ice was narrated for Rattling Books by Newfoundland singer/songwriter Ron Hynes.

== See also ==
- List of people of Newfoundland and Labrador
- List of communities in Newfoundland and Labrador
