= Laisha Rosnau =

Canadian novelist and poet (born 1972)

Laisha Rosnau (born 1972) is a Canadian novelist and poet.

== Biography ==
Born in Pointe-Claire, Quebec, Rosnau grew up in Vernon, British Columbia. She received a Master of Fine Arts in creative writing from the University of British Columbia, where she was the executive editor of the literary magazine Prism International. Her poetry and short fiction have been published in literary journals and anthologies in Canada, the United States, the United Kingdom and Australia.

Rosnau's first novel, The Sudden Weight of Snow (McClelland and Stewart, 2002), traces a year in the life of a 17-year-old girl living in the interior of British Columbia.

Rosnau's first collection of poetry, Notes on Leaving, was published in 2004, and won the 2005 Acorn-Plantos People's Poetry Award. Her second, Lousy Explorers (Nightwood, 2009), was a finalist for the Pat Lowther Award for best book of poetry by a Canadian woman.

Pluck (Nightwood, 2014) takes on issues of sexuality, parenthood, and vulnerability with delicacy and intent, and was nominated for the national Raymond Souster Award.

Rosnau's most recent collection of poetry, Our Familiar Hunger, was published in 2018, and was the winner of the 2019 Dorothy Livesay Poetry Prize, and the 2020 Kobzar Literary Award.

Her second novel, Little Fortress, was published by Wolsak & Wynn in fall 2019.

As well as full collections of poetry, Rosnau has published two limited edition chapbooks, Getaway Girl (Greenboathouse Books, 2002) and This Glossy Animal (Baseline Press, 2013).

In 2023, she was the recipient of the Latner Griffin Writers' Trust Poetry Prize.

Rosnau has taught fiction and poetry classes at UBC, Simon Fraser University, Vancouver Film School, and Okanagan College. She was the 2010 Writer in Residence at UBC Okanagan, where she currently teaches in the Creative Studies Department.

Rosnau is married to Aaron Deans and they have two children. The family are the resident caretakers of Bishop Wild Bird Sanctuary in Coldstream, British Columbia.

== Bibliography ==
=== Poetry ===
- Getaway Girl (2002)
- Notes on Leaving (2004)
- Lousy Explorers (2009)
- This Glossy Animal (2013)
- Pluck (2014)
- Our Familiar Hunger (2018)

=== Novels ===
- The Sudden Weight of Snow (2002) ISBN 0-7710-7580-4
- Little Fortress (2019)
