= Kobzar Literary Award =

KOBZAR Book Award is a biennial literary award that "recognizes outstanding contributions to Canadian literary arts by authors who develop a Ukrainian Canadian theme with literary merit". The prize is CA$25,000. It is awarded in one of several genres: literary non-fiction, fiction, poetry, young readers' literature, plays, screenplays and musicals. The award was established in 2003 by the Shevchenko Foundation and the inaugural ceremony was held in 2006.

In 2020, the Shevchenko Foundation also launched a CA$1,500 Emerging Writers Short Prose Competition, setting the groundwork for new writers to explore the short prose form with unpublished entries, and to one day aspire to submit an entry to the main KOBZAR Book Award.

== Winners ==
KOBZAR Book Award

- 2006: Danny Schur, Strike: The Musical (co-winner)
- 2006: Laura Langston, Lesia's Dream (co-winner)
- 2008: Janice Kulyk Keefer, The Ladies' Lending Library
- 2010: Randall Maggs, Night Work: The Sawchuk Poems
- 2012: Shandi Mitchell, Under This Unbroken Sky
- 2014: Diane Flacks, playwright, in collaboration with Andrey Tarasiuk and Luba Goy for the play Luba, Simply Luba
- 2016: Maurice Mierau, Detachment: An Adoption Memoir.
- 2018: Lisa Grekul and Lindy Ledohowski (Editors), Unbound: Ukrainian Canadians Writing Home.
- 2020: Laisha Rosnau, Our Familiar Hunger
- 2022: Maria Reva, Good Citizens Need Not Fear

Shevchenko Foundation Emerging Writers Short Prose Competition

- 2020: Tanya Berezuk, "Grafting"
- 2021: Adrian Lysenko, "Carpathian Spruce"
- 2022: Matthew Kruchak, “Business Men’s Lunch”
- 2023: Melissa Morelli Lacroix, Ivan and Irene
- 2024: Camille Pavlenko, The Cure for Breathlessness

== See also ==
- List of literary awards
- List of poetry awards
- Shevchenko National Prize
- Vasyl Stus Prize
- Warrior of Light
