= Danny Corcoran (ranger) =

Daniel "Danny" Corcoran (1916 – April 7, 1936) was Newfoundland Ranger (policeman) who died in an incident which many people believe to be tragic, as he was only 22 years old, on a solo expedition across the wilds of Newfoundland's Great Northern Peninsula.

== Death ==
Corcoran had set off into the wilderness in the dead of winter in an attempt to protect the local caribou population from poachers. However, the young ranger became lost and suffered severely from frostbite and starvation. As a popular and well-respected ranger in the Peninsula's coastal communities, a large-scale rescue effort was mounted to find Corcoran. Hampered by adverse weather conditions, Corcoran was not found until 17 days after first becoming lost. He was taken by boat to St. Anthony and died shortly thereafter.

== Later acknowledgement ==
His death and a love interest have made his life the subject of local lore. His destiny and his personality were immortalized in the book, "Will Anyone Search for Danny?" by Earl Pilgrim.

There is also a song written about Danny and his ill-fated patrol across the Peninsula by the name Danny Corcoran. The Carllion Showband recorded it on their Tribute to Newfoundland album which features Gregory Donaghey on vocals.

== See also ==
- List of people of Newfoundland and Labrador
