= Craig Francis Power =

Canadian writer and artist from St. John's, Newfoundland and Labrador

Craig Francis Power is a Canadian writer and artist from St. John's, Newfoundland and Labrador.

His debut novel, Blood Relatives, won the Writers' Alliance of Newfoundland and Labrador's Fresh Fish Award in 2007, and the Percy Janes First Novel Award for unpublished manuscripts in 2008. It was published in 2010, was short-listed for the BMO Winterset Award that year, and won the ReLit Award for Fiction in 2011. His second novel, The Hope, was published in 2016, and was again a ReLit Award finalist. His third novel, Skeet Love, followed in 2017. His first book of poetry, Total Party Kill, a meditation on addiction and sobriety through the imagery of Dungeons & Dragons, was published in 2024.

In 2018, he served as a judge for the Governor General's Award for English-language fiction, and for the CBC Short Story Prize.

As an artist, Power is known primarily for a subversive spin on folk art forms, such as hooked rug art. In 2008, he was nominated for the Sobey Art Award.
