= Carol Bishop-Gwyn =

Canadian writer and dance academic

- Occupations: writer, dance historian
- Spouse: Richard Gwyn (2005–2020, his death)
- Writing career
- Period: 2000s–present
- Notable work: The Pursuit of Perfection: A Life of Celia Franca

Carol Bishop-Gwyn is a Canadian writer and dance academic, best known as the author of The Pursuit of Perfection: A Life of Celia Franca, a biography of Celia Franca published in 2011. The book was a shortlisted nominee for the Governor General's Award for English-language non-fiction at the 2012 Governor General's Awards, and for the 2013 Charles Taylor Prize.

She has taught courses in dance history at Ryerson University (now Toronto Metropolitan University), York University and The School of Toronto Dance Theatre, and has worked as a freelance magazine writer and as a contributor to CBC Radio.

She was married to Canadian journalist and historian Richard Gwyn from 2005 until his death in 2020.
