= Janice Kulyk Keefer =

Canadian novelist and poet (born 1952)

- Born: Janice Kulyk; 2 June 1952 (age 74); Toronto, Ontario
- Education: University of Toronto (BA); University of Sussex (MPhil, D.Phil)
- Occupations: Novelist, poet
- Writing career
- Notable awards: Marian Engel Award; Kobzar Literary Award

Janice Kulyk Keefer (born 2 June 1952) is a Canadian novelist and poet. Of Ukrainian heritage, Kulyk Keefer often writes about the experiences of first-generation Canadian children of immigrants.

== Biography ==
She was born as Janice Kulyk on 2 June 1952 in Toronto, Ontario. She studied English literature at the University of Toronto, graduating with a BA. She then studied at the University of Sussex, where she received an MPhil and D.Phil. Following this, Keefer became an assistant professor of English studies at Université Sainte-Anne in Pointe-de-l'Église, Nova Scotia. She is a specialist in Modernist literature. In her literary work on Ukrainian-Canadian identity, she "rejects simplified notions of multiculturalism" in preference to a Ukrainian transnational identity. As of 2013, she is a professor of literature and theatre in the graduate studies department at the University of Guelph in Guelph, Ontario.

Her sister is the Canadian artist, Karen Kulyk and her son is the Decouple Podcast host Dr. Chris Keefer.

== Awards and honours ==
- 1987 Governor General's Awards, nominated, Under Eastern Eyes
- 1988 Books in Canada First Novel Award, nominated, Constellations
- 1996 Governor General's Awards, nominated, The Green Library
- 1999 Marian Engel Award, lifetime achievement
- 2006 Greifswald Canadian Studies Fellow in Residence, University of Greifswald, Germany
- 2008 Kobzar Literary Award, The Ladies Lending Library

== Bibliography ==
- White of the Lesser Angels (1986)
- The Paris-Napoli Express (1986)
- Transfigurations (1987)
- Under Eastern Eyes: A Critical Reading of Maritime Fiction
- Constellations
- Reading Mavis Gallant (1989)
- Travelling Ladies (1992)
- Rest Harrow (1992)
- The Green Library
- Marrying the Sea (1998)
- Kyiv, of Two Lands: New Visions (1998, anthology co-edited with Solemea Pavlychko)
- Honey and Ashes: A Story of Family (1998)
- The Waste Zone (2002)
- Thieves (2004)
- The Ladies' Lending Library (2007)
- Foreign Relations (2010)
