= Carmelita McGrath =

Canadian writer

- Born: Branch, Newfoundland and Labrador, Canada
- Education: Memorial University of Newfoundland
- Writing career
- Genres: Poetry; children's literature; novel
- Notable awards: Atlantic Poetry Prize 1998 To The New World; Newfoundland and Labrador Book Award 2000 Stranger Things Have Happened

Carmelita McGrath is a Canadian writer residing in St. John's, Newfoundland and Labrador. She writes poetry, children's literature, and novels. She has also written short stories and has received awards for her writings. Along with writing, McGrath is also an editor, teacher, researcher, and communications consultant.

== Life ==
McGrath was born in Branch, St. Mary's Bay. She received a Bachelor of Arts and a Bachelor of Education from the Memorial University of Newfoundland. She has been involved in several writing groups, including the Writer's Alliance of Newfoundland and Labrador, The Writer's Union, and the League of Canadian Poets. In 2015 she won the E.J. Pratt Poetry Award for her collection Escape Velocity.

She has also served as Board Member and Chair of the Newfoundland and Labrador Arts Council. McGrath is a former editor of TickleAce magazine and member of the Waterlily magazine's editorial collective. She has edited both fiction and non-fiction pieces for the Killick Press.

== Works ==
- Poems on Land and Water (1992)
- Walking to Shenak (1994)
- Their Lives and Times (1995)
- To The New World (1997)
- Stranger Things Have Happened (1999)
- The-Dog-Next-Year (2001)
- Ghost Poems (2001)
- The Boston Box (2003)
- Vistas (2005)
- Weather's Edge: A Compendium of Women's Lives in Newfoundland and Labrador (2005)
- Many Friends, One World (2008)
- Escape Velocity (2013)

== Awards ==
- 1998 Atlantic Poetry Prize for To The New World
- 2000 Newfoundland and Labrador Book Award for Stranger Things Have Happened
- Finalist for the 2000 Thomas Raddall Atlantic Fiction Award
- 2015 EJ Pratt Award for Escape Velocity
- Winterset Award Nominee for Escape Velocity
