= The Sparky Book =

- Directed by: Mary Lewis
- Written by: Mary Lewis
- Produced by: Annette Clarke
- Starring: Maggie Hickey; Joel Thomas Hynes; Leah Lewis; Gordon Pinsent
- Cinematography: Eli M. Yonova
- Edited by: Lawrence Jackman; Mary Lewis
- Production company: National Film Board of Canada
- Release date: 2006
- Running time: 14 minutes
- Country: Canada
- Language: English
- Budget: $CAD274,000 (estimated)

The Sparky Book is a 2006 animated/live-action short film by Newfoundland filmmaker Mary Lewis, about the near-death of a young girl who undergoes heart transplant surgery, and the death of her beloved pet dog, Sparky.

The story is based on the experiences of the director's own sister, Leah, who had two kidney transplants as a child. Michael Winter wrote a short story The Sparky Book after their dog had died. Director Lewis then loosely based her film on the short story. The film is narrated by a goldfish, voiced by Gordon Pinsent, with voice of Sparky by Joel Thomas Hynes. Leah Lewis appears in the film as "Bridget," a character based upon herself.

Produced by the National Film Board of Canada, the film received the Golden Sheaf Award for best experimental film and the Bill Boyle Award for Excellence in Screenwriting at Flicks: Saskatchewan International Youth Film Festival. In 2008, The Sparky Book was the sole film from Newfoundland and Labrador to be selected for CBC TV's "Short Film Faceoff", a six-part series showcasing films from Atlantic Canada.
