= Matthew Hollett =

Canadian writer

Matthew Hollett is a Canadian writer and photographer from Newfoundland and Labrador. He won the 2020 CBC Poetry Prize for his poem Tickling the Scar.

== Biography ==
Matthew Hollett is from Pasadena, Newfoundland and Labrador. He holds a Master of Fine Arts degree, and has taught at Grenfell Campus in Corner Brook. He began to pursue a career in writing after moving to St. John's. His first book, Album Rock, was published in 2018 by Boulder Publications. He received the 2017 NCLU Fresh Fish Award for Optic Nerve, a poetry collection about sight and photography which had not yet been published. Optic Nerve was published by Brick Books in 2023.

Hollett was longlisted for the CBC Poetry Prize in 2016 for his poem Merchant Vessel and Bomb Crater Behind Vimy Station. In 2017, he was longlisted for the CBC Nonfiction Prize for Painting the Curlew. Hollett was the winner of the 2020 CBC Poetry Prize for his poem Tickling the Scar. He was longlisted for the CBC Poetry Prize again in 2024 for his poem After Icebergs.

== Publications ==
=== Books ===
- Hollett, Matthew (2018). Album Rock: Looking Back Through the Lens of Paul-Émile Miot. Portugal Cove–St. Philip's, NL: Boulder Publications. ISBN 978-1-7752-3455-5. OCLC 1080210314.
- — (2023). Optic Nerve: Poems. Kingston, ON: Brick Books. ISBN 978-1-7713-1599-9. OCLC 1346213936.

=== Articles ===
- Hollett, Matthew (April 2017). "The Southside Hills in History and Song". Newfoundland Quarterly. St. John's, NL: MUN.
- — (May 2017). ""Walking Even Where No Flowers Grow"". Newfoundland Quarterly. St. John's, NL: MUN.
- — (June 2017). "Clarence Birdseye Eats His Way Through Labrador". Newfoundland Quarterly. St. John's, NL: MUN.
- — (August 2017). "Thirteen Ways of Looking at an Iceberg". Newfoundland Quarterly. St. John's, NL: MUN.
- — (October 2017). "Root Cellars and Flying Fish: the Bonavista Biennale". Newfoundland Quarterly. St. John's, NL: MUN.
