= Jessica Grant =

Canadian writer (born 1972)

Jessica Grant (born May 31, 1972 in St. John's, Newfoundland and Labrador) is a Canadian writer, whose debut novel Come, Thou Tortoise won the 2009 Winterset Award and the 2009 Books in Canada First Novel Award and was named as the winner of the 2009 Amazon.ca First Novel Award. The novel was also short-listed for the 2010 Canadian Library Association's Young Adult Book Award, and was long-listed for CBC's Canada Reads 2011 competition.

She previously won the Journey Prize in 2003 for her short story "My Husband's Jump", which was republished in her 2005 short story collection Making Light of Tragedy.

Jessica Grant is a member of the Burning Rock Collective, whose members include Newfoundland and Labrador writers Michael Winter and Lisa Moore.

In addition to writing Grant has also worked as an educator and has taught classes on creative writing and short fiction at Memorial University of Newfoundland (2007–2009), was a faculty member at Piper's Frith Writing Retreat in Swift Current, Newfoundland (2009) and the BANFF CENTRE (2010) and served as the writer-in-residence at Memorial University of Newfoundland for the winter 2011 semester.

She lives in St. John's, Newfoundland and Labrador.

== Works ==
- Making Light of Tragedy (2005)
- Come, Thou Tortoise (2009)
