= Claire Harris (poet) =

Canadian poet (1937–2018)

Claire Harris (13 June 1937 – 5 February 2018) was a Canadian poet. Harris was born Port of Spain, Trinidad and lived in Calgary, Alberta. Harris' numerous works explore themes such as mortality, the role and treatment of women of color in society, and the search for identity. Harris attended university in both Dublin and Jamaica, earning a Bachelor of Arts in English and a post-graduate diploma. She immigrated to Canada in 1966, working as a high school English teacher before publishing her first poetry book in 1984. After this, Harris published six books, as well as co-authoring two more and editing another. Her work has earned her numerous awards; her 1992 collection, Drawing Down a Daughter, was nominated for a Governor General's Award. In Calgary, Harris got involved working as a poetry editor for Dandelion Magazine from 1981 to 1989. She had also spread psychological struggles and issues with women experienced by women of Color and women in general.

== Bibliography ==
- 1984 Fables from the Women's Quarters
- 1984 Translation into Fiction
- 1986 Travelling to Find a Remedy
- 1989 The Conception of Winter
- 1992 Drawing Down a Daughter
- 1992 Kitchen Talk: An Anthology of Writings by Canadian Women (Editor with Edna Alford)
- 1995 Grammar of Dissent: Poetry and Prose (With Dionne Brand and M. NourbeSe Philip)
- 1996 Dipped in Shadow
- 1999 Demon Slayers (Co-Author with Paul Hollis)
- 2000 She
