= Mary Lewis (Canadian actress) =

Canadian actress and filmmaker

- Born: Kampala, Uganda
- Occupations: Film director, actress, writer
- Years active: 1988 - Present

Mary Lewis is a Canadian actress and filmmaker from St. John's, Newfoundland and Labrador. She was the recipient of the Newfoundland and Labrador Arts Council Artist of the Year Award in 1999.

== Life ==
She was born in Kampala, Uganda but grew up in St. John's. She lives with a daughter born in 2004, and divides her time between Toronto and St. John's.

== Work ==
In 1998, she wrote, directed, animated, and produced the short film When Ponds Freeze Over. The film went on to win various awards, including the Genie Award in 1999 for Best Short Film, the John Spotton Award at the 1998 Toronto International Film Festival for Best Canadian Short film, the Best Animated film Award at the Vancouver International Film Festival, the Best Canadian Film at the Atlantic Film Festival, and the Vanguard Award for Experimentation at the Laguna Beach International Film Festival.

Her 1999 film Clothesline Patch won a Gemini Award in 2002 for Best Dramatic Program. It was also the winner of the People's Choice Award at the Dawson City International Short Film Festival, The Bronze Plaque at the Columbus International Film and Video Festival, and the Best Dramatic Film Award at Cinequest International Film Festival in San Jose, California.

The Sparky Book (2006) was the winner of the Bill Boyle Award for Excellence in Screenwriting from Flicks International Film Festival, as well as a Golden Sheaf Award from Yorkton International Film Festival.

Other films she has directed include Rabbit Punch, Come Into My Parlour (a segment of movie Five Feminist Minutes), and Heart & Soul. Television directing credits include The Zack Files, Robson Arms, Train 48, and the 13-part international series about soccer fanaticism shot in 2010 Soccer Shrines.

In acting, she has appeared in the television series Kids in the Hall, Random Passage, Above and Beyond, and Republic of Doyle and the films Cruceros, The Elf, No Apologies, Finding Mary March, Extraordinary Visitor, Secret Nation, and When Ponds Freeze Over. On stage she has appeared in Copenhagen, Woyzek, Macbeth, Richard III, A Winter's Tale, A Streetcar Named Desire, The Occupation of Heather Rose, Later That Same Life, Chickens, Crime and Punishment, Uncle Vanya, and others.

Lewis is currently adapting Lisa Moore's novel February to screen and hopes to direct it.

== Filmography ==
- Dancer of the Board (2016)
- Michael M. Koerner (2015)
- Diana Leblanc (2015)
- Heart and Soul (2008)
- The Sparky Book (2006)
- Clothesline Patch (1999)
- Rabbit Punch (1999)
- When Ponds Freeze Over (1998)
- Come Into My Parlour (1990)
