= Sharon Bala =

Canadian writer (born 1979)

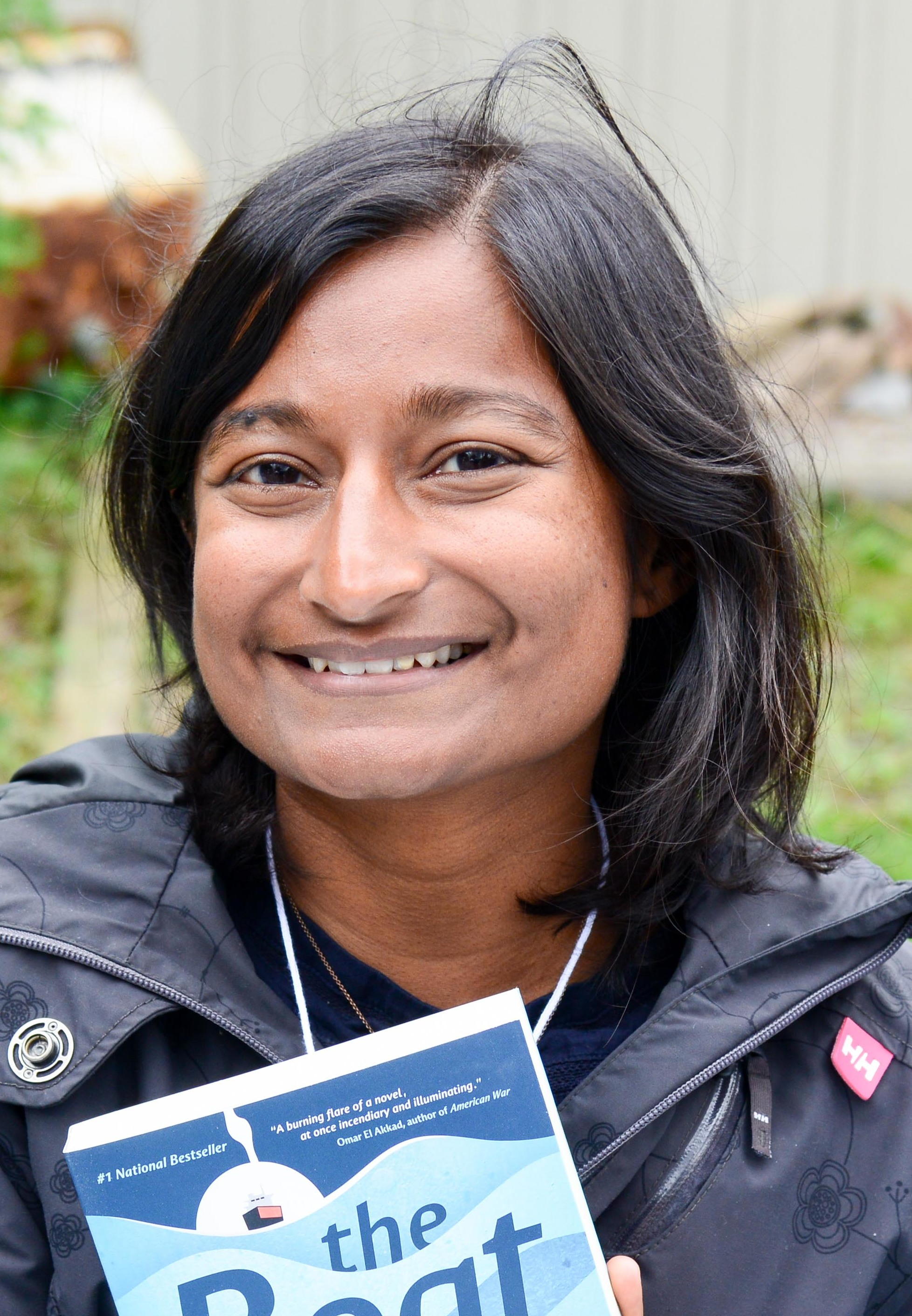
- Bala at the Eden Mills Writers' Festival in 2018
- Born: 1979 (age 46–47); Dubai, United Arab Emirates
- Education: Queen's University; University of Toronto
- Occupations: Novelist, short story writer
- Writing career
- Language: English
- Notable works: The Boat People; Good Guys; “Butter Tea at Starbucks”
- Notable awards: Percy Janes First Novel Award (2015); Journey Prize (2017); Harper Lee Prize for Legal Fiction (2019); Newfoundland and Labrador Book Award (2020)
- Website: www.sharonbala.com

Sharon Bala (born April 3, 1979) is a Canadian writer residing in St. John's, Newfoundland and Labrador.

Her debut novel, The Boat People, won the 2015 Percy Janes First Novel Award for unpublished manuscripts. It was later published by McClelland and Stewart and Doubleday in January 2018. The book was internationally publicized as part of Penguin Random House's One World, One Book campaign. It was selected for the 2018 edition of Canada Reads, where it was defended by Mozhdah Jamalzadah. It won the Harper Lee Prize for Legal Fiction, was a finalist for the 2018 amazon.ca First Novel Award, and was shortlisted for the 2015 Fresh Fish Award for Emerging Writers and the 2019 Thomas Head Raddall Award.

Her second novel, Good Guys, was shortlisted for both the Toronto Book Award and the Governor General's Award for Fiction.

Bala was the winner of the 2017 Journey Prize for her short story "Butter Tea at Starbucks", and was longlisted for the 2017 National Magazine Award for fiction for her short story "Miloslav". Her short fiction has appeared in Hazlitt, Grain, The Dalhousie Review, Riddle Fence, Room, Prism International, Maisonneuve, Joyland, The New Quarterly, and in an anthology called Racket: New Writing From Newfoundland.

== Publications ==
- The Boat People (2018)
- Good Guys (2026)

== Awards and honours ==
=== Wins ===
- 2015 – Percy Janes First Novel Award for the unpublished manuscript of The Boat People.
- 2017 – Journey Prize for "Butter Tea at Starbucks", published in The New Quarterly.
- 2019 – Harper Lee Prize for Legal Fiction for The Boat People.
- 2020 – Newfoundland and Labrador Book Award for The Boat People.

=== Shortlists ===
- 2015 – Shortlisted for the Fresh Fish Award for Emerging Writers for The Boat People.
- 2018 – Finalist for the Amazon.ca First Novel Award for The Boat People.
- 2019 – Shortlisted for the Thomas Head Raddall Award for The Boat People.
- 2026 – Shortlisted for the Toronto Book Award for Good Guys.
- 2026 – Finalist for the Governor General's Award for English-language fiction for Good Guys.

=== Longlists ===
- 2017 – Longlisted for the National Magazine Award for fiction for "Miloslav".

=== Canada Reads ===
- 2018 – The Boat People was selected for Canada Reads and defended by Mozhdah Jamalzadah.
