= Eva Crocker =

Canadian writer

- Born: St. John's, Newfoundland and Labrador
- Writing career
- Genre: fiction

Eva Crocker is a Canadian writer based in St. John's, whose debut short story collection Barrelling Forward was published in 2017.

The daughter of writer Lisa Moore and Memorial University of Newfoundland academic Stephen Crocker, she was a child actor in her youth, appearing in Mary Lewis's 1998 short film When Ponds Freeze Over.

Following the publication of Barrelling Forward she was named as a finalist for the 2017 Dayne Ogilvie Prize for LGBTQ writers, and the book was a nominee for the 2018 ReLit Award for short fiction.

Her first novel, All I Ask, was published in 2020. The novel was longlisted for the Giller Prize in 2020; Crocker was the first child of a prior Giller nominee to receive a nomination. It won the Winterset Award for 2020. It was also a finalist for the ReLit Award for fiction in 2021.

In 2023, she published the novel Back in the Land of the Living.
