= Sandra Gwyn =

Canadian journalist and writer

- Born: May 17, 1935; St. John's, Newfoundland
- Died: May 26, 2000 (aged 65)
- Spouse: Richard Gwyn

Alexandra Sandra Fraser Gwyn, OC (17 May 1935 – 26 May 2000) was a Canadian journalist and writer.

She was born in St. John's, Newfoundland, the daughter of Claude Fraser and Ruth Harley. After her father's death, her mother remarried and the family moved to Halifax, Nova Scotia where Sandra attended Sacred Heart Convent. She graduated from Dalhousie University in 1955. After graduating, she moved to London where she worked at the Institute of Contemporary Arts. She returned to Ottawa and married Richard Gwyn in 1958.

During the 1970s, she was the Ottawa editor for Saturday Night.

In 2000, she was made an Officer of the Order of Canada.

She died in 2000 after a five-year fight against breast cancer. Richard Gwyn subsequently launched a literary award, the Winterset Award, in her memory to honour writers from Newfoundland and Labrador.

== Selected works ==
- Tapestry of War: A Private View of Canadians in the Great War ISBN 0-00-639485-X (1992)
- Mary Pratt (1989)
- The Private Capital: Ambition and Love in the Age of Macdonald and Laurier (1984), winner of the 1984 Governor General's Awards.
