= Mary Dalton =

Canadian poet and educator

Mary Dalton (born 1950) is a Canadian poet and educator.

== Life and career ==
Mary Dalton was born in the parish of Harbour Main, Newfoundland and Labrador.

She edited Newfoundland Studies: An Interdisciplinary Journal in 1987 and was editor and co-publisher of TickleAce. A literary journal of Newfoundland and Labrador from 1980 to 1986.

Dalton founded the SPARKS Literary Festival in 2009 and served also as the festival's director for the first six years. SPARKS celebrates the literary creations of Newfoundland and Labrador and showcases writers at various stages of their creative lives. It is what Dalton has called a "word spree".

She is professor emerita in the Department of English at Memorial University of Newfoundland in St. John's and Poet Laureate of the City of St. John's.

Her latest collection of poems is the limited-edition letter-press chapbook Waste Ground (Running the Goat, 2017), with engravings by Abigail Rorer of Massachusetts.

== Awards and honours ==
Dalton has won various awards for her poetry, among them the Newfoundland and Labrador Arts and Letters Award for Poetry in 1997, 2002, and 2006, as well as the TickleAce/Cabot Award for Poetry in 1998. Her collection Merrybegot (2003) was awarded the 2005 E. J. Pratt Poetry Award and the Newfoundland and Labrador Book Award for Poetry. It was also shortlisted for the 2004 all-genre Winterset Award, the 2004 Pat Lowther Award, and the 2005 Newfoundland and Labrador Heritage and History Award. Her fourth collection is Red Ledger (2006), published by Véhicule Press, which was shortlisted for the E. J. Pratt Poetry Award and the Atlantic Poetry Award. In 2008, a set of her riddling poems, Between You and the Weather, was published by Running the Goat Books. Hooking: A Book of Centos was released by Véhicule Press in 2013. It was shortlisted for the 2014 J. M. Abraham Award, the newly named Atlantic Poetry Prize, and for the inaugural Fred Cogswell Award for Excellence in Poetry, also in 2014.

== Bibliography ==
=== Poetry ===
- The Time of Icicles (Breakwater Books, 1989, 1991).
- Allowing the Light (Breakwater Books, 1993).
- Merrybegot (Véhicule Press, Signal Editions, 2003; audiobook version by Rattling Books, 2005)
- Red Ledger (Véhicule Press, Signal Editions, 2006).
- Between You and the Weather (Running the Goat, 2008). Wood engravings by Wesley W. Bates.
- Hooking: A Book of Centos (Véhicule Press, Signal Editions, 2013).
- Waste Ground (Running the Goat, 2017). Chapbook, with wood engravings by Abigail Rorer.
- Interrobang (Véhicule Press, 2024)

=== Prose ===
- Edge: Essays, Reviews, Interviews (Palimpsest Press, 2015).
- The Vernacular Strain in Newfoundland Poetry (Breakwater Books, 2022). Text of the 2020 Pratt Lecture, delivered on March 4, 2020.

=== In anthologies ===
- Choice Atlantic: Writers of Newfoundland and the Maritimes (Breakwater Books, 1990).
- Words Out There: Women Poets in Atlantic Canada (Roseway Publishing, 1999).
- New Canadian Poetry (Fitzhenry and Whiteside 2000); the edges of time (Seraphim Editions, 1999).
- Landmarks: An Anthology of New Atlantic Canadian Poetry (The Acorn Press, 2001).
- Modern Canadian Poets: An Anthology of Poems in English, edited by Evan Jones and Todd Swift (Carcanet Press, 2010).
- The Art of the Sonnet, edited by Stephen Burt and David Mikics, Harvard University Press (The Belknap Press, 2010).
- The Best Canadian Poetry in English 2013, edited by Sue Goyette (Tightrope Books, 2013).
- The Breakwater Book of Contemporary Newfoundland Poetry, edited by Mark Callanan and James Langer (2013).
- 70 Canadian Poets, edited by Gary Geddes (Oxford University Press, 2014).
- Earth and Heaven : An Anthology of Myth Poetry, edited by Amanda Jernigan and Evan Jones (Fitzhenry and Whiteside, 2015).
- The Best of the Best Canadian Poetry in English, edited by Anita Lahey and Molly Peacock (Tightrope Books, 2017).
