= Richard Gwyn (Canadian writer) =

Canadian journalist, author, and civil servant (1934–2020)

Richard Gwyn OC
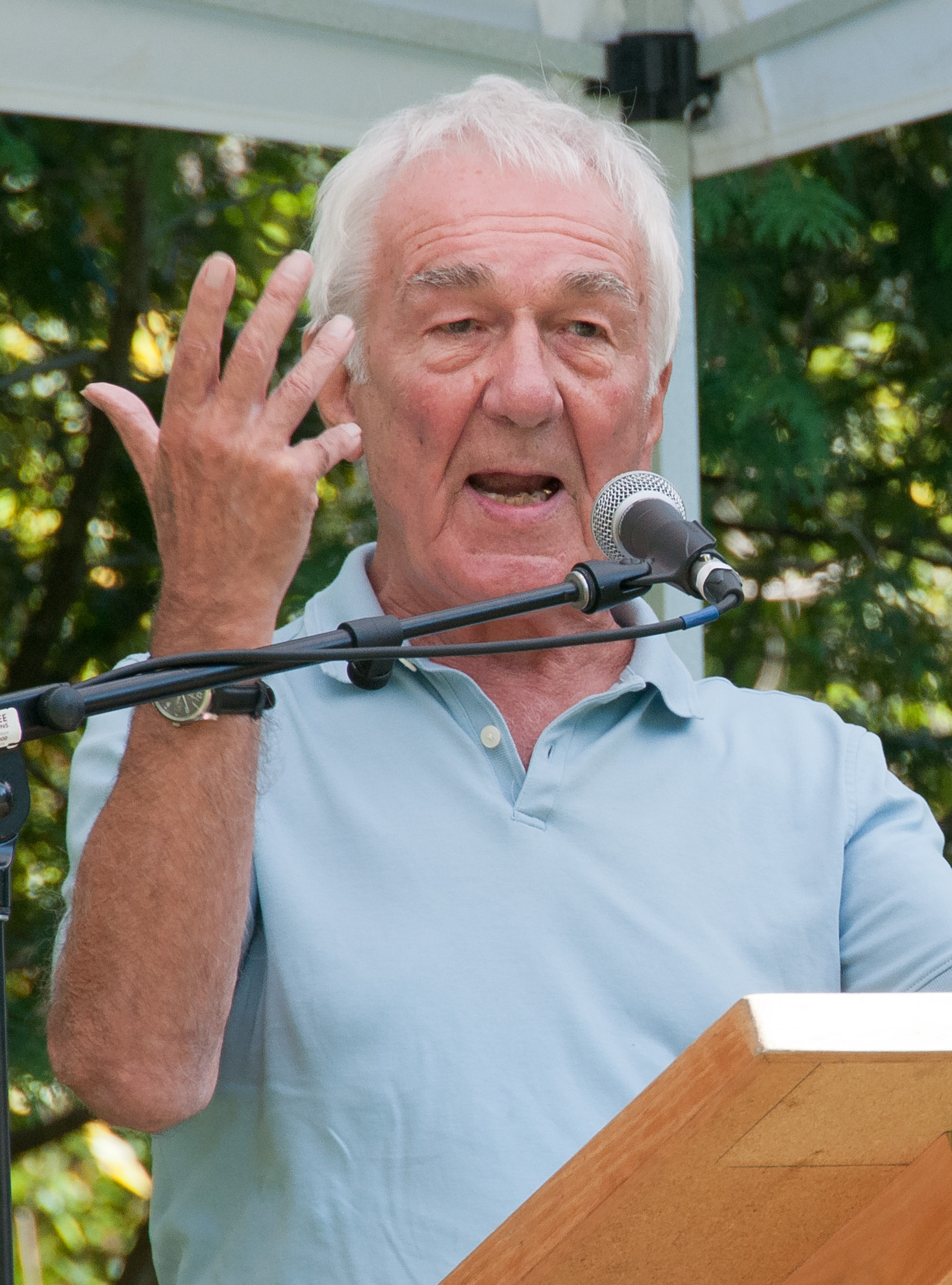
- Gwyn at the Eden Mills Writers' Festival in 2012
- Born: Richard John Philip Jermy Gwyn; May 26, 1934; Bury St. Edmunds, England
- Died: August 15, 2020 (aged 86); Toronto, Ontario
- Citizenship: United Kingdom; Canada
- Occupations: Journalist, author
- Spouses: Sandra Gwyn (m. 1958; died 2000); Carol Bishop-Gwyn (m. 2005)
- Writing career
- Notable works: The Northern Magus: Pierre Trudeau and Canadians; John A.: The Man Who Made Us; Nation Maker: Sir John A. Macdonald: His Life, Our Times

Richard John Philip Jermy Gwyn OC (May 26, 1934 – August 15, 2020) was a British and Canadian journalist, author, historian, and civil servant.

== Early life ==
Richard Gwyn was born on May 26, 1934, in Bury St. Edmunds, England. He was the second son to Brigadier Philip Eustace Congreve Jermy Gwyn, an Indian Army officer, and Elizabeth Edith Jermy Gwyn (née Tilley), the eldest daughter of Sir John Anthony Cecil Tilley. His older brother died in infancy.

At the age of 20, in 1954, he emigrated to Canada.

== Education ==
Gwyn was educated at Stonyhurst College, a co-educational Jesuit-run Roman Catholic boarding school in Lancashire, England. He also attended the Royal Military Academy Sandhurst.

== Career ==
Gwyn began his career as a radio reporter in Halifax, Nova Scotia.

From 1957 to 1959, Gwyn was the parliamentary correspondent for United Press International, in Ottawa. Later from 1959 to 1960, he worked for Thomson Newspapers. From 1960 to 1962, he was the Ottawa editor for Maclean-Hunter Business Publications. From 1962 to 1968, he worked for Time Canada as a parliamentary correspondent and contributing editor. From 1968 to 1970, he was the executive assistant to the Minister of Communications, Eric Kierans. From 1970 to 1973, he was the director-general, of socio-economic planning in the Department of Communications.

In 1973, Gwyn joined The Toronto Star and worked as a national affairs columnist until 1985. He then became an international affairs columnist later that year until 1992. He continued to write columns on public affairs for the Star, on a freelance basis, until 2016.

As an author, he is best known for his 1980 contemporary biography of Pierre Elliot Trudeau, The Northern Magus, and for a two-volume historical biography of Sir John A. Macdonald. The first volume of his Macdonald biography, The Man Who Made Us, won the Charles Taylor Prize for Literary Non-Fiction in 2008. The second volume, Nation Maker: Sir John A. Macdonald: His Life, Our Times; Volume Two: 1867-1891, won the Shaughnessy Cohen Prize for Political Writing in 2012 and was a finalist for the Governor General's Award for English-language non-fiction and the Hilary Weston Writers' Trust Prize for Nonfiction.

From 1983 to 1987 he and Robert Fulford co-hosted the long-form interview show Realities on TVOntario. Gwyn also appeared weekly as a panellist from 1994 to 2006 on TVO's Studio 2 and Diplomatic Immunity and was an occasional guest on The Agenda until 2017.

== Personal and later life ==
Four years after emigrating to Canada, Gwyn married Sandra Gwyn in 1958. Their marriage lasted till her death on May 26, 2000, due to breast cancer. Gwyn subsequently remarried to Carol Bishop-Gwyn, and after residing in the Cabbagetown neighbourhood of Toronto, he moved with his wife into a condominium in the Lawrence Park neighbourhood.

On November 29, 2001, Gwyn was appointed chancellor of St. Jerome's University at the University of Waterloo and was installed on March 17, 2002. The same year, he became an Officer of the Order of Canada.

Gwyn ceased writing his column in 2016 and made his last appearance as a television panellist in 2017. He had been living with Alzheimer's disease for several years and resided at Dunfield Retirement Residence, an assisted living facility in midtown Toronto. He died from Alzheimer's on August 15, 2020.

== Major works ==
- The Shape of Scandal: A Study of a Government in Crisis. 1965.
- Smallwood, The Unlikely Revolutionary. 1965.
- The Northern Magus: Pierre Trudeau and Canadians, McClelland & Stewart, Toronto, 1980.
- The 49th Paradox: Canada in North America. 1985.
- Nationalism Without Walls: The Unbearable Lightness of Being Canadian. 1995.
- John A.: The Man Who Made Us. 2007.
- Nation Maker: Sir John A. Macdonald: His Life, Our Times (reprint ed.). Random House of Canada. 2011. ISBN 978-0-3073-5645-1.

== See also ==
- List of University of Waterloo people
