= Andrew Peacock (writer) =

Canadian author and retired veterinarian

Andrew Peacock is a Canadian author and retired veterinarian residing in Freshwater-Carbonear, Newfoundland. His debut book, Creatures of the Rock: A Veterinarian's Adventures in Newfoundland was longlisted for the 2015 Leacock Medal for Humour and won for non-fiction in the 2015 Newfoundland and Labrador Book Awards.

== Life ==
Peacock was born in Toronto and raised in Kapuskasing, Ontario. He moved from Ontario to Newfoundland in 1982 after graduating from the University of Guelph as a Doctor of Veterinary Medicine. Peacock practiced as a mixed-animal veterinarian in rural Newfoundland from 1982 to 2010. After retiring from veterinary practice, he wrote two books, both of which are inspired by his time as a veterinarian. He also previously owned an independent bookstore in Carbonear called "Waterwords" with his wife. Along with his literary career, Peacock worked for the Newfoundland and Labrador College of Veterinarians.

== Works ==
- Creatures of the Rock (2014)
- One Brave Boy and His Cat (2019)
- VIRAL (2020)
- Bifocal (2021)

== Awards ==
- 2015 Leacock Medal for Humour (long-listed) for Creatures of the Rock
- 2015 Newfoundland and Labrador Book Awards (won) for Creatures of the Rock
