= Sheilah Lukins =

Canadian writer

Sheilah Lukins is a Canadian writer residing in St. Phillip's, Newfoundland. She writes both non-fiction titles and books for children. The first book in her children's series, Full Speed Ahead: Errol's Bell Island Adventure, won the Bruneau Family Children's/Young Adult Award, which is a part of the Newfoundland and Labrador Book Awards. The second book in the series, Flying Ace: Errol's Gander Adventure, won a Canada Book Award. Along with writing, she works at the Memorial University Library.

== Works ==
=== Non-fiction ===
- For Maids Who Brew and Bake: Rare and Excellent Recipes from 17th Century Newfoundland (2003)
- Rain, Drizzle, and Fog: Newfoundland Weather Stories
- Bottom's Up, A History of Alcohol in Newfoundland and Labrador (2020)

=== Children's books ===
- Full Speed Ahead: Errol's Bell Island Adventure (2016)
- Flying Ace: Errol's Gander Adventure (2019)
- Once upon an Iceberg: Errol's Twillingate Adventure (2020)

== Awards ==
- Canada Book Award for Flying Ace: Errol's Gander Adventure
- Bruneau Family Children's/Young Adult Award for Full Speed Ahead: Errol's Bell Island Adventure
- Gourmand Award for Drink History for Bottom's Up, A History of Alcohol in Newfoundland and Labrador
