= Holly Hogan =

Canadian wildlife biologist

Holly Hogan is a Canadian wildlife biologist and writer based in St. John's, Newfoundland and Labrador, whose work is centred around documenting and mitigating the consequences of plastic pollution in our oceans.

== Published work ==
Her book Message in a Bottle: Ocean Dispatches from a Seabird Biologist, published in 2023, focuses on a troubling pattern spotted on her voyages across the world's seas: plastic pollution. Combining nature, science and adventure writing, Hogan puts the spotlight on the impact of plastic waste, providing an eyewitness account of its effects on the marine environment and highlighting international efforts to reduce plastic disposal in the ocean.

Message in a Bottle won the 2023 BMO Winterset Award, was a finalist for the Governor General's Award for English-language non-fiction at the 2023 Governor General's Awards, and was shortlisted for both the 2023 Science Writers and Communicators Book Award and 2024 Lane Anderson Award.

== Personal life ==
Hogan is a mother of three and lives in St. John’s, Newfoundland, with her husband, Michael Crummey.
