= Lists of Canadian writers =

The lists of Canadian writers include:

== By ethnicity ==
- List of Asian Canadian writers
- List of Black Canadian writers
- List of Jewish Canadian writers

== By field or genre ==
- List of Canadian historians
- List of Canadian journalists
- List of Canadian philosophers
- List of Canadian playwrights
- List of Canadian poets
- List of Canadian short story writers
- List of Canadian cookbook writers
- List of Canadian science fiction and fantasy authors

== By language ==
- List of French Canadian writers from outside Quebec
- List of Canadian women writers in French

== By province or territory ==
- List of writers from Alberta
- List of writers from British Columbia
- List of writers from Manitoba
- List of writers from New Brunswick
- List of writers from Newfoundland and Labrador
- List of writers from Nova Scotia
- List of writers from Ontario
- List of writers from Prince Edward Island
- List of writers from Quebec
- List of writers from Saskatchewan
- List of writers from the Canadian territories

== See also ==
- Lists of Canadians
- Lists of writers
