= Tracey Waddleton =

Canadian writer

Tracey Waddleton (born September 1, 1979) is a Canadian writer from Newfoundland and Labrador. Her debut short story collection, Send More Tourists...the Last Ones Were Delicious, was the 2020 winner of the ReLit Award for short fiction.

Waddleton was born in St. John's, but grew up in the small town of Trepassey. An earlier draft of Send More Tourists was shortlisted for the province's Fresh Fish Award for emerging writers in 2013, before being published in 2019 by Breakwater Books.
