= Ed Kavanagh =

Canadian writer

Ed Kavanagh (born December 1954) is a Canadian writer residing in Mount Pearl, Newfoundland. He is also a musician, theatre director, actor, and university lecturer. His first novel, The confessions of Nipper Mooney, won the 2002 Newfoundland Book Award.

== Life ==
Kavanagh was born in St. John's, Newfoundland, at St. Clare's Mercy Hospital in December 1954 and grew up in Kilbride, Newfoundland. He received an B.A. (Hons) in English and a B.Ed. from the Memorial University of Newfoundland. He also received a B.A. in Music from Carleton University and a M.A. in English and Creative Writing from the University of New Brunswick.

Kavanagh is a harpist and has released three CDs, including On Strings of Light: Christmas Melodies Performed on Celtic Harp, One Star Awake, and Weaving the Wind. Kavanagh has taught creative writing through Memorial University and the University of New Brunswick. He was also a former president of the Writer's Alliance of Newfoundland and Labrador.

== Works ==
- The Cat's Meow - The 'Longside Players Selected Plays: 1984-1989 (1990)
- The Confessions of Nipper Mooney (2001)
- Amanda Greenleaf: The Complete Adventures (2004)
- Strays (2013)

== Awards ==
- 2002 Newfoundland Book Award for The Confessions of Nipper Mooney
- Finalist for the Winterset Award for The Confessions of Nipper Mooney
- Nominated for the International IMPAC Dublin Literary Award for The Confessions of Nipper Mooney
- Shortlisted for the Newfoundland Book Award for Fiction for Strays
- Shortlisted for the Thomas Raddall Atlantic Fiction Award for Strays
