= St. Leonards, Newfoundland and Labrador =

Coordinates: 47.466°N 54.450°W

Location of St. Leonards in Newfoundland and Labrador

St. Leonards is a settlement in Newfoundland and Labrador.
