= Isaac Chesley Morris =

Canadian writer, businessman and politician (1857–1937)

- Born: 1857; St. John's, Newfoundland Colony
- Died: July 1937 (aged 79–80)
- Occupations: Writer, businessman, politician

Isaac Chesley Morris (1857 – July 1937) was a Newfoundlander writer, businessman and politician.

== Biography ==
Morris was born in 1857, in St. John's, Newfoundland Colony, to Walter and Margaret Morris (née Latimer). He was educated at Central School. After graduating, he established I. C. Morris Sailworks, which closed following World War I.

In 1914, Morris was elected to St. John's City Council, also being reelected in 1920. He became chairman in 1921, following William Gosling's resignation.

Morris was a regular contributor to newspapers, and was a public speaker. He also wrote books about the history of Newfoundland. He had 5 children: Robert, Rupert, Sholto, Fred and Eve. He died in July 1937, aged 79 or 80.

== Bibliography ==
- Morris, Isaac Chesley (1987). The dawn of the twentieth century as pertaining to Newfoundland. Canada. ISBN 066538954X.
