= Jill Hartman =

Canadian poet and editor (born 1974)

Jill Hartman (born May 21, 1974) is a Canadian poet and editor.

Hartman was born in Calgary, Alberta. Her first book of poetry, A Painted Elephant, was published by Coach House Books in 2003 and was shortlisted for the League of Canadian Poets' Gerald Lampert Award as well as the Writer's Guild of Alberta Stephan G. Stephansson Award. Hartman is a micro-press publisher, and under the imprint semi-precious press has published her own work as well as poetry by Johanna Drucker, Colin Morton, and Angela Rawlings. As part of the Calgary Writing Community, Hartman has worked as an Editor for local literary magazines dANDelion and filling Station. Her second book of poetry is a feminist examination of sexual slang using the tropes of dance and piracy. Booty: Hurricane Jane and Typhoon Mary is co-written with Calgary-based poet Brea Burton and published by The Mercury Press.
