= Michael Winter (writer) =

Canadian writer

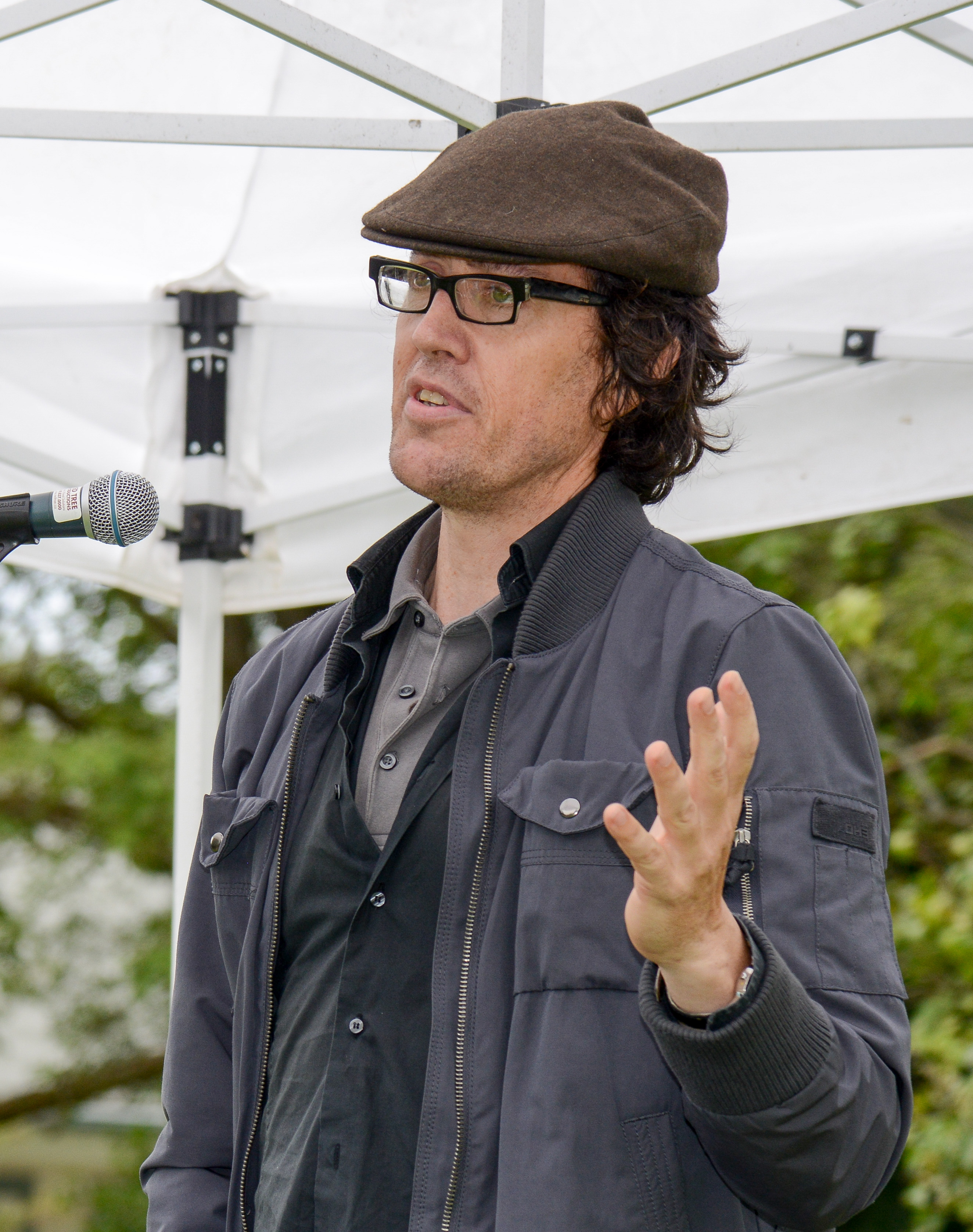
Winter at the Eden Mills Writers' Festival in 2013

Michael Winter (born 1965) is a Canadian writer, the author of five novels and three collections of short stories.

== Life and career ==
Michael Winter was born in 1965 in Jarrow, England. His father was an industrial arts teacher, who moved the family to Newfoundland, Canada three years later, eventually settling in Corner Brook. After high school, Winter attended Memorial University, graduating in 1986 with a BA in economic geography.

Winter's first short story collection, Creaking in Their Skins, was published in 1994. In 1999, editor John Metcalf at The Porcupine's Quill published his second book of stories, One Last Good Look. Winter moved to Toronto in 1999, where he published his first two novels: This All Happened (2000) and The Big Why (2004).

Much of Winter's fiction chronicles the life and adventures of his fictional alter ego, Gabriel English. This All Happened, for example, is organized as a fictional diary, with 365 entries describing Gabriel's life in St. John's, his relationship with filmmaker Lydia Murphy, and the progress of the novel he is trying to write. The book was nominated for the 2000 Rogers Writers' Trust Fiction Prize and won the inaugural Winterset Award.

The Big Why was a historical novel narrated by real-life American artist Rockwell Kent describing the time he spent in Brigus, Newfoundland, in 1914. Kent was eventually deported from Newfoundland on suspicion of being a German spy.

Winter was one of the judges of the 2006 Giller Prize, and his line drawings illustrate Noah Richler's This is My Country, What's Yours? A Literary Atlas of Canada (2006). He serialized short teasers for each chapter of his third novel, The Architects are Here (2007), on Facebook.

The Death of Donna Whalen (2010), his fourth novel, is described by the author as "documentary fiction". It uses court documents, transcripts and other material to tell the story of Donna Whalen, a St. John's woman stabbed to death, possibly by her boyfriend Sheldon Troke. The book is based on the 1993 murder of Brenda Young.

He divides his time between Toronto and Newfoundland, and is the brother of novelist Kathleen Winter.

== Critical commentary ==
Winter's novels and short stories have been described as having "a free-flowing, vibrant dialogue, presented without quotation marks. His characters' speech ranges from contemplative and meandering to rapid fire and piercing."

Lynn Coady, reviewing The Death of Donna Whalen, wrote that Winter's use of documentary material "shows amazing faith in the power of story itself, the sheer ability of raw human character to transfix us. In stepping back from centre stage and turning the spotlight entirely on this devastating array of intersecting lives and deaths, Winter has enacted some of the most powerful storytelling of his career."

== Prizes and honours ==
- 2000 Nominee, Rogers Writers' Trust Fiction Prize (for This All Happened)
- 2000 Winterset Award (for This All Happened)
- 2004 Short list, Trillium Book Award (for The Big Why)
- 2004 Short list, Thomas Head Raddall Award (for The Big Why)
- 2004 Long list, IMPAC Literary Award (for The Big Why)
- 2007 Long list, Giller Prize (for The Architects are Here)
- 2008 Writers' Trust Notable Author Award
- 2010 Shortlist, Rogers Writers' Trust Fiction Prize (for The Death of Donna Whalen)
- 2013 Longlist, Scotiabank Giller Prize (for Minister Without Portfolio)

== Bibliography ==
=== Short fiction ===
- Creaking in Their Skins (1994)
- One Last Good Look (1999)
- The Sparky Book

=== Novels ===
- This All Happened (2000)
- The Big Why (2004)
- The Architects Are Here (2007)
- The Death of Donna Whalen (2010)
- Minister Without Portfolio (2013)

=== Non-fiction ===
- Into the Blizzard: Walking the Fields of the Newfoundland Dead (2014)
