= Sara Tilley =

Canadian actor and writer from Newfoundland and Labrador

- Born: St. John's, Newfoundland and Labrador, Canada
- Occupations: Actor, writer, director

Sara Tilley is a Canadian writer from Newfoundland and Labrador, most noted for winning the Winterset Award in 2016 for her novel Duke. The novel was also named to the initial longlist for the 2017 International Dublin Literary Award, but was not a finalist.

== Personal life ==
Sara was born in St. John's, Newfoundland and Labrador. She attended York University for acting.

== Career ==
A graduate of the theatre program at York University, she is primarily a playwright and theatre director based in St. John's. She was the artistic director of the feminist theatre company She Said Yes! from 2002 to 2016, and has written or co-written plays including Signifying Nothing, The Soul Walking, One Big Mess, The Jailer’s Daughter and Other Mad Fools Cracking Their Livers to Pieces for Love, Nosebleed, Grand Central Station, Mr. Invisible, No Mummers Allowed In, Lulu, The (In)complete Herstory of Women in Newfoundland (and Labrador!) and Fruithead.

Under the working title Snowflake, her debut novel won the Percy Janes First Novel Award for unpublished manuscripts in 2004. The book was published by Pedlar Press in 2008 under the title Skin Room. A French translation by Annie Pronovost was published in 2016 under the title Écorchée, and was defended by Antonine Maillet in the 2018 edition of Le Combat des livres.

As an actress, she has worked primarily on stage, as well as appearing in the film The Grand Seduction and episodes of Hatching, Matching and Dispatching and Republic of Doyle. She has trained in the Pochinko clown technique, and won Newfoundland and Labrador's Rhonda Payne Theatre Award in 2007.

== Novels ==
- Skin Room (2008)
- Duke (2015)
