= Earl Pilgrim =

Canadian writer and boxer (1939–2025)

Earl B. Pilgrim (1939 – July 3, 2025) was a Canadian writer and professional boxer.

== Life and career ==
Pilgrim was born in St. Anthony, Newfoundland, in 1939. He studied forestry at the College of Trades and Technology in St. John's. In 1960, he joined the Canadian Armed Forces as an infantryman. During this period, Pilgrim also competed professionally in boxing; he earned the title of Canadian Light Heavyweight Boxing Champion.

After leaving the military, Pilgrim began working in the Newfoundland provincial forestry department, serving as a forest ranger and forest warden. He later became a wildlife protection officer.

Pilgrim later established himself as an author, primarily published by Flanker Press. The publisher released six of his books during the late 1990s and early 2000s. His notable works include Curse of the Red Cross Ring, Will Anyone Search for Danny?, The Day Grenfell Cried, and The Ghost of Ellen Dower.

In 2018, his home was destroyed by fire. Pilgrim died on July 3, 2025, at the age of 86.
