= Percy Janes =

Canadian writer

- Born: Percy Maxwell Janes; 12 March 1922; St. John's, Newfoundland, Canada
- Died: 19 February 1999 (aged 76); St. John's, Newfoundland and Labrador
- Occupation: Novelist
- Writing career
- Period: 1947–1987
- Genre: Fiction
- Notable work: House of Hate

Percy Maxwell Janes (March 12, 1922 – February 19, 1999) was a Newfoundland-born Canadian writer and novelist, known primarily for his 1970 novel House of Hate. His work often deals with life in Newfoundland, mainly from his own first-hand experience.

== Biography ==
Janes was born in St. John's, Newfoundland, the son of Eli Janes and Lillian Berkshire. The family moved to Corner Brook when he was seven years old. He attended school in Corner Brook until 1938, when he received a scholarship to attend Memorial University College in St. John's. While studying there, he became associate editor of the college's yearbook, The Cap and Gown. He published the poem "To Robert Burns" and the short skit "All's Fair in Fun and College" in its 1940 edition.

After graduating, he moved to Canada and spent four years in the Canadian Navy until 1945. He then enrolled in Victoria College at the University of Toronto, where he graduated with a Bachelor of Arts degree in 1948, having won the Lincoln Hutton Scholarship for best English essay in 1946. He published four more poems between 1947 and 1950.

In 1950, Janes married Margaret Ruth Bowes of Ontario and in 1951, he decided to become a full-time writer. Within a few years, he moved to England, completing his first novel, So Young and Beautiful, which was published by A.H. Stockwell of Ilfracombe. Janes and his wife divorced in 1954, with no children.

While Janes was in England, he began writing his most popular and critically acclaimed book, House of Hate. The novel was a story of a Newfoundland family that was consumed by hate, living in angst and desperately searching for hope and love. House of Hate had taken several years to write and numerous failed attempts at getting published, before Toronto publisher McClelland and Stewart published it in 1970. It was later included in the New Canadian Library series in 1976 with an introduction by Margaret Laurence.

He returned from England in 1973, settling just outside of St. John's in St. Thomas, where he continued to write and publish. He died in 1999.

== Legacy ==
The Newfoundland and Labrador Arts Council presents an annual literary award, the Percy Janes First Novel Award, in his memory.

== Bibliography ==
=== Novels ===
- So Young and Beautiful (A.H. Stockwell, 1958)
- House of Hate (McClelland and Stewart, 1970; Breakwater Books, 1992)
- Eastmall (Potlatch Publications, 1982)
- No Cage for Conquerors (H. Cuff, 1984)
- Requiem for a Faith (Creative Publishers, 1984)
- Requiem for a Faith II: The Rebels and the Renegades (Creative Publishers, 1984)
- The Picture on the Wall: A Novella (Creative Publishers, 1985)

=== Short story collections ===
- Newfoundlanders: Short Stories (H. Cuff, 1981)
- A Collection of Short Stories (H. Cuff, 1987). Includes all of the stories in Newfoundlanders, in addition to "The Solution", "Captain Stephen Hawco", and "Encounter in England".

=== Poetry collections ===
- Light and Dark: Poems (H. Cuff, 1980)
- Roots of Evil: Para-Political Verse (XX Press, 1985)

=== As editor ===
- Twelve Newfoundland Short Stories, ed. Percy Janes and Harry Cuff (H. Cuff, 1982)
