= Jenny Higgins =

Canadian author and researcher

Jenny Higgins is a Canadian author and researcher residing in Flatrock, Newfoundland and Labrador. She specializes in Newfoundland and Labrador history and has written for the provincial Department of Education and the Maritime History Archive. Her debut novel, Perished: The 1914 Newfoundland Sealing Disaster, won the Democracy 250 Atlantic Book Award. Her second book, Newfoundland in the First World War, won the 2017 Newfoundland and Labrador Book Award. Higgins has written pieces for CBC, the Memorial University's Newfoundland and Labrador Heritage Website, as well as other magazines and newspapers.

== Life ==
Higgins attended the Memorial University of Newfoundland for her undergraduate program, earning a bachelor's degree in English. She received a master's degree from Queen's University. She managed the English Language Research Centre at the Memorial University of Newfoundland from 2010 to 2012. In 2019, she became the "Wikipedian in Residence", a position offered through the Centre for Newfoundland Studies at the Memorial University of Newfoundland. She is an organizer of "Wiki-Edit" events at the A.C. Hunter Library, with a focus on adding more information about the province of Newfoundland and Labrador to Wikipedia.

== Works ==
- Perished: The 1914 Newfoundland Sealing Disaster (2014)
- Newfoundland in the First World War (2016)

== Awards ==
- 2015 Democracy 250 Atlantic Book Award for Perished: The 1914 Newfoundland Sealing Disaster
- 2017 Newfoundland and Labrador Book Award for Newfoundland in the First World War
