= Breakwater Books =

Canadian publishing company

- Founded: 1973
- Founder: Tom Dawe, Al Pittman, Clyde Rose, Pat Byrne, and Richard Buehler
- Country of origin: Canada
- Headquarters location: St. John's, Newfoundland and Labrador
- Distribution: University of Toronto Press Distribution
- Publication types: Books
- Official website: www.breakwaterbooks.com

Breakwater Books Ltd. is a Canadian publishing company based in Newfoundland and Labrador. Although the company began as a way for local authors in Newfoundland and Labrador to publish their work without leaving the province, Breakwater now publishes works from authors throughout Canada and the UK. The company places a strong emphasis on publishing books that preserve and celebrate the culture of Newfoundland and Labrador, although they publish books in many different genres. The company is also known for its publication of educational materials for schools, and was the first company in Atlantic Canada to do so. As of 2004, Breakwater had published over 600 titles, releasing between 10 and 15 titles every year.

== History ==
On March 22, 1973, five professors at Memorial University of Newfoundland – Tom Dawe, Al Pittman (d. 2001), Clyde Rose (d. 2023), Pat Byrne, and Richard Buehler – determined that the access to Newfoundland and Labrador learning materials was far too limited for their liking. At the time, Newfoundland writers either had to go to mainland publishers, or take on the financial burden of publishing their works themselves. It was at this time that the five men decided that something must be done. So, through that sense of frustration, Breakwater Books LTD. was formed. With an initial mission to publish materials that would preserve the culture of Newfoundland and Labrador, the men began publications.

The early years of Breakwater were spent in Clyde Rose's basement. The five men worked as a team, initially publishing educational materials. However, the interest in Breakwater soon grew, and the part-time operation flourished into a full-time business. It was at this time that Clyde Rose stepped in as full-time manager of Breakwater Books, which Pat Byrne has said was "a risky move".

Since the early years of Breakwater, the business has grown under Rose's management. Recently, the company has expanded its horizons to publish works from various genres, most notably children's literature, fiction, and poetry. As of 2003, Breakwater had published over 500 titles, a number which has only grown substantially since that time.

== Ownership ==
Breakwater Books was founded in 1973 by Richard Buehler, Pat Byrne, Tom Dawe, Al Pittman, and Clyde Rose. In 2009, Rose retired from his position as president of the company, passing ownership on to his daughter, Rebecca Rose. Rebecca Rose had already been employed by the company and handling its day-to-day operations since 2000. She is also the president of the Atlantic Publishers Marketing Association, and was named Youth Entrepreneur of the Year by the Newfoundland and Labrador Organization of Women Entrepreneurs.

== Awards ==
The following books published by Breakwater have won awards:

- Voyages: Canada's Heritage Rivers – National Resources Council of America Award for Best New Environmental Publication
- Waiting For Time – Canadian Authors Association Award for Fiction
- January, February, June or July – Young Adult Canadian Book Award
- Sooshewan, Child of the Beothuk – Canadian Children's Book Centre Choice Award
- Wind Over Dark Tickle – Canadian Children's Book Centre Choice Award
- Fanny For Change – Canadian Children's Book Centre Choice Award
- Ray Guy's Best – Stephen Leacock Award for Humour
- Down by Jim Long's Stage – Canadian Association of Children's Libraries Award
- Soe Longe as There Comes Noe Women: Origins of English Settlement in Newfoundland – Canadian Historical Association's Regional History Certificate of Merit
- Borrowed Black – The Alcuin Citation for Excellence in Book Design in Canada
