= Tom Dawe =

Canadian writer

Tom Dawe CM ONL
- Born: Tom Dawe; October 24, 1940 (age 85); Long Pond, Newfoundland
- Education: Memorial University
- Occupation: Writer
- Writing career
- Language: English

Tom Dawe, CM ONL (born October 24, 1940) is a Canadian writer from Newfoundland and Labrador.

== Background ==
Born in Long Pond, Newfoundland, Tom Dawe has written poetry and children's literature for many years. He is also a visual artist. His work often draws on folklore, mythology, autobiography, and Newfoundland culture, particularly the experience of growing up in a Newfoundland outport community.

Tom Dawe was a founding member in 1973 of Breakwater Books, the province's first publishing house. He was also a co-founder of TickleAce magazine, and an editor of the folklore publication The Livyer. Dawe also taught English at Memorial University of Newfoundland. His work is the subject of Rewriting Newfoundland Mythology: The Works of Tom Dawe, by Martina Seifert.

In the opening of his career, Tom Dawe felt too shy to read his own work to others. To get him going, venerable publisher Clyde Rose offered to do the readings for him. From the lesson, Dawe became highly proficient at public delivery. As an example (like many other events through the years), Dawe successfully led the 2015 holiday CBC audio presentation of The Old Man's Winter Night.

Tom Dawe was made a Member of the Order of Canada in 2011, and an Officer of the Order of Newfoundland and Labrador in 2012.

From 2010–2013, Dawe was the poet laureate of St John's, Newfoundland and Labrador. His 2019 New and Collected Poems was shortlisted in the poetry category for the 2020 ReLit Award.

In the 2020 Walrus essay The Poet Who Warns Us Not to Revere the Past, Tom Dawe is said to be "about the difficulty of change" made from his own "disarmingly plain-spoken, quietly perceptive poems".

== Bibliography ==
=== Poetry ===
- Connections, with Tom Moore (St John's: Self-published, 1972)
- Hemlock Cove and After (St John's: Breakwater Books, 1975)
- In a Small Cove (Chipping Norton, UK: Wychwood Press, 1978)
- Island Spell (St John's: Harry Cuff Publications, 1981)
- In Hardy Country: New and Selected Poems (St John's: Breakwater Books, 1993)
- Sea Foam Swings in the Bluebell: A Chapbook of Haiku, edited by Nick Avis (Pointe Claire, QC.: King's Road Press, 2005)
- Where Genesis Begins, with artwork by Gerald Squires (St John's: Breakwater Books, 2009)
- Caligula's Horse and Other Creatures, with lithographs by Gerald Squires (Running the Goat, 2009)
- Shadows in the Aftergrass: Poems Sometimes Haiku, with afterword by Nick Avis (Tors Cove: Running the Goat, 2013)
- New and Collected Poems (St John's: Breakwater Books, 2019)

=== Children's literature ===
- Landwash Days: Newfoundland Folklore, Sketches, and Verse for Youngsters (St. John's: Newfoundland Book Publishers, 1980)
- A Gommil from Bumble Bee Bight and Other Nonsense Verse, illustrated by Sylvia Quinton Ficken (St. John's: Harry Cuff Publications, 1982)
- Angishore, Boo-man and Clumper: A Newfoundland Folk Alphabet, illustrated by Sylvia Quinton Ficken (St. John's: Harry Cuff Publications, 1983)
- Lings 'n' Things: (a count and colour book), with Pamela Dawe (St. John's: H. Cuff Publications, 1986)
- Alley-coosh, Bibby and Cark: A Second Newfoundland Folk Alphabet, illustrated by Sylvia Quinton Ficken (St. John's: H. Cuff Publications, 1987)
- Winter of the Black Weasel: A Tale Based on a Newfoundland Micmac Legend, illustrated by Anne MacLeod (St. John's: Breakwater Books, 1988)
- Moocher in the Lun, illustrated by Anne MacLeod (St John's: Flanker Press, 2008)
- The Wonderful Dogfish Racket, illustrated by C. Anne Macleod (St. John's: Pennywell Books, 2013)
- An Old Man's Winter Night: Ghostly Tales, illustrated by Veselina Tomova (Tors Cove: Running the Goat, 2015)
- Spirited Away: Fairy Stories of Old Newfoundland, illustrated by Veselina Tomova (Tors Cove: Running the Goat, 2017)

=== Short stories ===
- The Loon in the Dark Tide: Old Newfoundland Ghost Stories (St. John's: H. Cuff Publications, 1981)
- The Yarns of Ishmael Drake (St. John's: H. Cuff Publications, 1982)
