= Randall Maggs =

Canadian poet and former professor

Randall Maggs is a Canadian poet and former professor of English Literature at Sir Wilfred Grenfell College of Memorial University, in Corner Brook, Newfoundland. He is one of the organizers and now artistic director of the March Hare, the largest literary festival in Atlantic Canada.

== Early life ==
Maggs was born in Vancouver. The son of a Royal Canadian Air Force officer, his family lived on bases in Western Canada while he was growing up. He later joined the forces himself as a pilot. He left to travel through Europe and North Africa and then return to university to do graduate work at Dalhousie and the University of New Brunswick.

== Academic and writing career ==
Since the late 1970s, he has lived on the west coast of Newfoundland, where he taught Literature and Creative Writing at Memorial University's Grenfell College.

Maggs' poetry has appeared in the 1994 collection, Timely Departures (Breakwater) and in several reviews and anthologies, such as Poetry Ireland Review, Coastlines: The Poetry of Atlantic Canada and Stephen Brunt's The Way It Looks from Here: Contemporary Canadian Writing on Sport and the March Hare Anthology (Breakwater, 2007). He has co-edited two anthologies of Irish and Newfoundland and Labrador poetry: However Blow the Winds (WIT & Scop, 2004) and The Echoing Years, published in 2007.

A collection of poems, entitled Night Work: The Sawchuk Poems, was launched in early 2008 at Toronto's Hockey Hall of Fame and included in the Globe and Mail’s "Top 100 Books" for that year. A short film was produced with Randall Maggs, based on his book. Titled "Night Work: A Sawchuk Poem" the 4-minute film was premiered at the launch of the book, screened at the Atlantic Film Festival, and toured nationally with Moving Stories Film Festival. The short is directed by Justin Simms, with a screenplay by Greg Spottiswood, co-produced with Judith Keenan of BookShorts Literacy Program. In 2009, Night Work won the Winterset Award and E.J. Pratt Poetry Prize, and in 2010, the Kobzar Literary Award.

Maggs' close connection with Ireland was recognized in the Spring of 2007 when he was awarded a Coracle Fellowship to work in that country. An accomplished woodworker, he took part in the 2001 Ireland/Newfoundland exhibition, Wood: A Sculptual Investigation. The Black Rod used in Senate of Canada ceremonies is one of his pieces.

His daughter Adriana Maggs is a television and film writer, best known for her debut feature film Grown Up Movie Star. His brother is former hockey star Darryl Maggs.

== Poem of the month ==
Maggs' poem "How things look in a losing streak" was chosen as Poem of the Month on February 11, 2008 by John Steffler, Canadian Parliamentary Poet Laureate.
