= Joan Clark =

Canadian writer (1934–2023)

- Born: 12 October 1934 Liverpool, Nova Scotia, Canada
- Died: 11 April 2023 (aged 88)
- Occupation: Author
- Genre: Children's literature

Joan Clark (née MacDonald; 12 October 1934 – 11 April 2023) was a Canadian fiction author.

Born in Liverpool, Nova Scotia, Clark spent her youth in Nova Scotia and New Brunswick. She attended Acadia University for its drama program, graduating with a Bachelor of Arts degree with an English major in 1957. She has worked as a teacher.

Clark moved to Alberta in the early 1960s with her engineer husband and attended the University of Alberta before moving to Calgary in 1965. There she started to write stories. She lived in Alberta for two decades. In 1975, she and Edna Alford started the literary journal Dandelion in that province. In 1976, she studied with W. O. Mitchell at the Banff Centre. Clark also served as president of the Writers' Guild of Alberta. She eventually returned to Atlantic Canada in 1985, settling in St. John's, Newfoundland. There she was a founding member of the Writers Alliance of Newfoundland and Labrador.

Clark served on the jury of the 2001 Giller Prize. In 2010 she was made a Member of the Order of Canada. In 2018, An Audience of Chairs, a film adaptation of her novel was released.

== Awards and recognition ==
- 1988: fiction finalist, Governor General's Awards
- 1988: finalist, Books in Canada First Novel Award, The Victory of Geraldine Gull
- 1991: Marian Engel Award
- 1995: Geoffrey Bilson Award, The Dream Carvers
- 1996: Mr Christie's Book Award, "The Dream Carvers"
- 1998: Honorary Doctor of Letters, Sir Wilfred Grenfell College
- 1999: Vicky Metcalf Award
- 2003: Geoffrey Bilson Award, The Word for Home
- 2006: longlisted for the International Dublin Literary Award, An Audience of Chairs
- 2010: Order of Canada

== Books ==
- 1968: Girl of the Rockies
- 1971: Thomasina and the Trout Tree (Tundra) ISBN 0-912766-02-6
- 1977: The Hand of Robin Squires (Clarke, Irwin) ISBN 0-7720-1091-9 (La main de Robin Squires: le mystere de l'ile aux Chenes, translated by Claude Aubry (P. Tisseyre, 1984) ISBN 2-89051-158-8)

Penguin Canada paperback editions: ISBN 0-14-031905-0, ISBN 0-14-301512-5
other paperback editions: ISBN 0-7720-1311-X, ISBN 0-7736-7426-8

- 1982: From a High Thin Wire (NeWest) ISBN 0-920316-51-4
- 1984: "Leopard & the Lily" (Oolichan Books/The IRPP) ISBN 0889820783
- 1985: Wild Man of the Woods (Viking Canada) ISBN 0-670-80015-5

Penguin Canada paperback ISBN 0-14-031788-0

- 1987: The Moons of Madeleine (Viking Kestrel) ISBN 0-670-81284-6

Penguin Canada paperback ISBN 0-14-032182-9

- 1988: The Victory of Geraldine Gull (Macmillan of Canada) ISBN 0-7715-9281-7
- 1990: Swimming Toward the Light (Macmillan of Canada) ISBN 0-7715-9975-7
- 1993: Eiriksdottir: A Tale of Dreams and Luck (Macmillan of Canada) ISBN 0-7715-9009-1
- 1995: The Dream Carvers (Viking Canada) ISBN 0-670-85858-7 (Les sculpteurs de rêves, translated by Catherine Germain (P. Tisseyre, 2004) ISBN 2-89051-773-X)

Penguin Canada paperback ISBN 0-14-038629-7

- 2000: Latitudes of Melt (Knopf Canada) ISBN 0-676-97288-8

Vintage Canada paperback, ISBN 0-676-97291-8

- 2002: The Word for Home (Viking Canada) ISBN 0-670-91121-6
- 2004: "Snow" Illustrated by Kady MacDonald Denton ISBN 978-1773062310(House of Anansi Press) [ref:]
- 2005: An Audience of Chairs (Knopf Canada) ISBN 0-676-97655-7
- 2009: "Road to Bliss" (Penguin Random House Canada) ISBN 978-0385666879 [ref:}
- 2015: The Birthday Lunch (Knopf Canada) ISBN 0-345-80956-4
