= Harold Horwood =

Canadian politician (1923–2006)

Harold Horwood CM

Member of the Newfoundland House of Assembly for Labrador
- In office May 27, 1949 – November 26, 1951
- Preceded by: District established
- Succeeded by: Frederick W. Rowe

Personal details
- Born: Harold Andrew Horwood; November 2, 1923 St. John's, Newfoundland
- Died: April 16, 2006 (aged 82) Halifax, Nova Scotia, Canada
- Party: Liberal
- Spouse: Cornelia Corky (m. 1972)
- Children: 2
- Education: Prince of Wales Collegiate
- Profession: Author

Harold Andrew Horwood CM (November 2, 1923 – April 16, 2006) was a Canadian novelist, non-fiction writer and politician from Newfoundland and Labrador. He served as the member of the Newfoundland House of Assembly for Labrador from 1949 to 1951. As an author, Horwood was most well known for his books Tomorrow Will Be Sunday (1966) and White Eskimo (1972).

== Early life ==
The son of Andrew Horwood and Vina Maidment, Horwood was born in St. John's, Newfoundland. He experienced a love of literature from a young age and while still an adolescent had already decided on a literary career. He pursued this goal despite the objections of his parents, with whom he did not get along, drawing more inspiration from the life of his paternal grandfather, John Horwood, a sea captain.

He was educated at Prince of Wales Collegiate and worked at various labouring jobs for a number of years, which eventually led him to become a labour organizer. Around the same time, he and his brother Charlie founded a literary magazine called Protocol. Beginning in 1948 he worked closely with Joey Smallwood in the campaign to bring Newfoundland into Confederation. From 1949 to 1951, he was a member of the Newfoundland House of Assembly, sitting as the member for Labrador for Smallwood's Liberals. After leaving politics he started writing a political column for the Evening Telegram newspaper. Though he supported Smallwood at first, by the mid-1950s he had become one of the premier's harshest critics.

== Writing career ==
His first book, Tomorrow Will be Sunday, was published in 1966. Though it was a novel, Horwood acknowledged its autobiographical elements. The novel White Eskimo (1972), arguably his best-known work, was inspired in part by Esau Gillingham. All told, he wrote more than 20 books, including novels, history, natural history, biography, and autobiography. His contribution to Newfoundland literature does not consist only of the works he produced, but also in the example he provided to young writers at a time when little literature had been produced in the province. However, as his political writing and some of his literature indicates, he did not always hold Newfoundland culture, particularly that of the 'outports' or fishing villages, in high regard.

== Other activities ==
During the 1960s he became an opponent of industrialization and began to interest himself in various 'counter-cultural' concerns. For a year he ran an alternative school in St. John's, known as "Animal Farm".

Among Horwood's other accomplishments were being a founding member and head of the Writers' Union of Canada, and holding the position of writer-in-residence at the University of Western Ontario and University of Waterloo.

== Later life ==
In 1980, he was made a Member of the Order of Canada for his "contributions to Canadian literature".

He lived his last twenty-five years in Annapolis Royal, Nova Scotia. He and his wife Cornelia (Corky), whom he married in 1972, had two children, Andrew and Leah. He died of cancer at the age of 82 in Halifax.

== Bibliography ==
Sources:

- Tomorrow Will Be Sunday - 1966, fiction
- The Foxes of Beachy Cove - 1967, named Best Scientific Book of the Year
- Newfoundland - 1969
- Voices Underground - 1972 (editor)
- White Eskimo - 1972, fiction
- Beyond the Road: Portraits & Visions of Newfoundlanders - 1976 (with Stephen Taylor, photographer)
- The Colonial Dream: 1497/1760 - 1978
- Bartlett: The Great Canadian Explorer - 1979, biography
- Only the Gods Speak - 1979
- Tales of the Labrador Indians - 1981 (editor)
- Historic Newfoundland - 1986
- Remembering Summer - 1987
- Dancing on the Shore - 1987
- Bandits and Privateers - 1988
- Joey - 1989, biography
- The Magic Ground - 1996
- Evening Light - 1997
- A Walk in Dream Time: Growing Up in Old St. John's - 1997, autobiography
- Among the Lions: A Lamb in the Literary Jungle - 2000

== See also ==
- List of University of Waterloo people
