= Lisa Moore (writer) =

Canadian writer and editor

- Born: St. John's, Newfoundland, Canada
- Occupations: Novelist, short story writer

Lisa Moore (born 28 March 1964) is a Canadian writer and editor established in the province of Newfoundland and Labrador.

== Biography ==
Born in St. John's, Newfoundland, Moore studied art first at College of the North Atlantic in her home province and then at the Nova Scotia College of Art and Design. Although she had intended to follow a career in the visual arts, she now writes full-time.

Moore's work primarily takes place in Newfoundland. She has worked to promote different writers and places of the province by compiling local artists' text and writing articles about Newfoundland communities. In her new book The Democracy Cookbook, Moore writes a non-partisan approach to "stir up conversations around cabinet tables".

Moore's daughter Eva Crocker is also a writer, whose debut short story collection Barrelling Forward was published in 2017.

== Awards and recognition ==
Moore's first two books, Degrees of Nakedness (1995) and Open (2002), are short story collections. Open was a commercial and critical breakthrough, earning a nomination for the Giller Prize. Open was subsequently published as an unabridged audiobook. Her first novel, Alligator (2005), was also nominated for the Giller Prize. It won the 2006 Commonwealth Writers' Prize Best Book Award, Caribbean and Canada Region, and was longlisted for the 2007 International Dublin Literary Award.

Moore was one of 13 novelists on the long list for the 2010 Man Booker Prize for February, a prize worth approximately $80,000. In an interview with CBC Radio, Moore said she was "completely overwhelmed with happiness" when she heard the news while staying in a remote cabin with her husband.

On February 15, 2013, February won Canada Reads 2013: Turf Wars.

She released her newest short story collection, Something for Everyone, in 2018. The book was named as a longlisted nominee for the 2018 Scotiabank Giller Prize.

Her book Invisible Prisons: Jack Whalen's Tireless Fight for Justice, cowritten with Whalen, was a finalist for the Hilary Weston Writers' Trust Prize for Nonfiction.

== Bibliography ==
=== Fiction ===
- Alligator (2005)
- February (2009)
- Caught (2013)
- Flannery (2016)
- This Is How We Love (2022)

=== Short story collections ===
- Degrees of Nakedness (1995)
- Open (2002)
- The Selected Short Fiction of Lisa Moore (2012)
- Something for Everyone (House of Anansi, 2018)
  - excerpt: The fjord of eternity. Granta, 141, special ed. Canada, September 2017, pp 261–276

=== Periodicals ===
- Rock Haven (2011)
- A Labour of Love (2014)
