= List of people from St. John's, Newfoundland and Labrador =

This is a list of notable people from St. John's, Newfoundland and Labrador. Although not everyone in this list was born in St. John's, they all live or once lived in St. John's and have had significant connections to the community.

== A ==
- Luke Adam, ice hockey player for the Adler Mannheim of the Deutsche Eishockey Liga (DEL)
- Frederick C. Alderdice, businessman and politician
- John Anderson, politician
- John Murray Anderson, director, producer, songwriter and author
- Ralph LeMoine Andrews, recipient of the Order of Canada
- Scott Andrews, politician
- John Bartlett Angel, recipient of the Order of Canada
- Lewis H.M. Ayre, businessman

== B ==
- Cathy Bennett, politician
- George John Bond, Methodist minister
- Tim Baker, singer
- Robert Bond, politician
- Charles R. Bowring, merchant and politician
- Edgar Rennie Bowring, businessman and politician
- Dana Bradley, student, murder victim
- Frederick Gordon Bradley, politician
- Donald Brian, actor, dancer, and singer
- Cyprian Bridge, British Royal Navy officer
- Harry Brown, journalist
- Vincent P. Bryan, composer and lyricist
- Ed Buckingham, politician
- Dean Burry, composer, librettist, and educator
- Michelle Butler Hallett, writer

== C ==
- William Aquin Carew, prelate
- Frederick Carter, lawyer and politician
- Sean Casey, politician
- Bill Clark, writer
- Ryan Cleary, politician and journalist
- Zoe Cleland, actor and filmmaker
- Al Clouston, storyteller and humorist
- Ryane Clowe, National Hockey League player
- Anne Chislett, playwright
- William Coaker, politician
- Bob Cole, sportscaster
- Henry Collingwood, businessman and recipient of the Knight's Cross of Royal Order of St. Olav
- Richard Collins, actor
- Maggie Connors, Professional Women's Hockey League player
- Eric Cook, politician
- Gordon S. Cowan, politician and judge
- Darrell Critch, Anglican bishop
- Mark Critch, comedian
- Chesley Crosbie, businessman and politician
- John Crosbie, former politician
- Dan Crummell, politician
- Michael Crummey, author

== D ==
- Mary Dalton, poet
- Edward Henry Davey, architect and politician
- Tom Dawe, poet
- Dax, rapper
- Anne Marie DeLuise, actress
- William Denning, merchant and legislator
- Ethel Dickenson, educator and nurse
- Molly Dingle, educator
- Craig Dobbin, industrialist
- Clive Doucet, writer and politician
- Brian Downey, actor
- Harold Druken, National Hockey League player
- William Duane, journalist and newspaper publisher
- Margaret Duley, novelist
- Brian Joseph Dunn, Roman Catholic bishop
- Gwynne Dyer, journalist

== E ==
- Carl English, professional basketball player

== F ==
- Edward Feild, bishop
- Charles Philip Fenwick, Canadian Surgeon General
- Grunia Movschovitch Ferman, entrepreneur, activist
- David Ferry, actor
- Michael Anthony Fleming, Catholic bishop
- James Patrick Fox, politician
- Andrew Furey, politician
- George Furey, senator

== G ==
- Armine Nutting Gosling, suffragette
- Moya Greene, civil servant and businesswoman
- Ryan Greene, National Hockey League player
- Colin Greening, National Hockey League player

== H ==
- Edward Haliburton, politician
- Ralph Hamelmann, songwriter, professor, columnist, cartoonist, and television producer
- Tom Harrington, journalist
- Jack Harris, politician
- Peter Hart, historian
- Don Harvey, bishop
- Moses Harvey, clergyman, essayist, and naturalist
- Allan Hawco, actor
- Bonnie Hickey, politician
- William Hogan, politician
- James Patrick Howley, naturalist and geologist
- Hugh Hoyles, politician and lawyer
- Charles H. Hutchings, politician and lawyer

== J ==
- John Jago, minister
- Don Jamieson, politician
- Percy Janes, writer
- Robert Brown Job, businessman and politician
- Don Johnson, president of the Canadian Amateur Hockey Association and a Newfoundland sports executive
- Paul Johnson, philanthropist
- Cathy Jones, writer and comedian

== K ==
- William Keen, former judicial officer
- Tom Kennedy, journalist
- Susan Kent, actress
- Thomas Kersey, sailor
- Dale Kirby, politician and university professor
- Mary Bernard Kirwan, teacher

== L ==
- Raymond Lahey, Catholic bishop
- Paul Lane, politician
- Zebulon Aiton Lash, lawyer, civil servant, and businessman
- Ruth Lawrence, actress, writer and filmmaker
- Walter Learning, theatre director and actor
- Mary Lewis, actress and filmmaker

== M ==
- George MacDonnell, officer in the British Army in the War of 1812
- William D. MacGillivray, director
- Francis MacKenzie, politician
- Fannie Knowling McNeil, suffragette and artist
- Campbell Leonard Macpherson, businessman
- Cluny MacPherson, physician and the inventor of the gas mask
- Greg Malone, actor
- Earle McCurdy, labour leader
- Patrick Thomas McGrath, journalist and politician
- Robin McGrath, writer
- Thomas Meagher, merchant
- Thomas Meagher, MP
- Rick Mercer, television show host, comedian
- Lorraine Michael, politician
- Arthur William Miller, politician
- Harold Mitchell, politician
- Mary Xavier Molony, Presentation Sister who was the first nun to establish Catholic schools in Newfoundland
- Lisa Moore, author
- Jason Morgan, National Hockey League player
- Francis Morris, solicitor and politician
- John T. Mullock, Catholic bishop
- George Murphy, politician
- George Murray, poet

== N ==
- Alex Newhook, National Hockey League player
- Dave Nicol, singer-songwriter
- Wanda Nolan, writer and filmmaker
- Dwayne Norris, National Hockey League player
- Warren Norris, American Hockey League player

== O ==
- Scott Oake, sportscaster
- Doug O'Brien, National Hockey League player
- Mark O'Brien, actor
- Fabian O'Dea, lawyer
- Deborah Odell, actress
- James Louis O'Donel, first Roman Catholic bishop of St. John's
- Johnathan Ogden, surgeon
- Seamus O'Regan, news reporter
- Tom Osborne, politician
- John Ottenheimer, lawyer and politician
- Joseph Outerbridge, businessman and philanthropist
- Sir Leonard Cecil Outerbridge, businessman and philanthropist

== P ==
- Alyssa Nicole Pallett, model, actress, and businesswoman
- William Parker, builder
- Helen Parsons Shepherd, artist
- Jean Payne, businesswoman
- Krystin Pellerin, actress
- Rae Perlin, artist
- Vera Perlin, businesswoman
- William Petten, politician
- William Ping, writer and journalist
- Robert Pilot, artist
- Cyprian Pinkham, bishop
- Al Pittman, poet and playwright
- Eleanor Power, first English woman to be executed in what is today Canada
- Sarah Power, actress
- Thomas Joseph Power, Catholic bishop
- Craig Francis Power, writer
- Tom Power, broadcaster and musician
- Christopher Pratt, painter
- Teddy Purcell, National Hockey League player

== R ==
- Christopher Ralph, actor
- Gerry Rogers, filmmaker and politician
- Isabella Whiteford Rogerson, poet, philanthropist
- Mark Rudkin, member of the British Army
- Frederick Russell, businessman
- John Ryan, printer
- Terry Ryan, National Hockey League player

== S ==
- Louise Saunders, lawyer
- Tommy Sexton, comedian
- Thomas Skinner, Ceylon
- John Slaney, National Hockey League player
- Sebastian Spence, actor
- Helena Squires, politician
- Anthony Stack, deputy commander of the 5th Canadian Division
- Marit Stiles (born 1969), politician
- Geoff Stirling, businessman
- Kim Stockwood, musician

== T ==
- William Bevil Thomas, merchant, land developer, and sea captain
- Greg Thomey, actor
- Sara Tilley, writer
- Mary Widdicombe Travers, hotelier and historical figure
- James Tuck, archaeologist
- Otto Tucker, author, educator
- Paul Tucker, artist
- Zachary Turner, boy killed by his mother, Shirley Jane Turner, in a murder-suicide on 18 August 2003
- Shannon Tweed, actress
- Tracy Tweed, actress

== W ==
- Mary Walsh, actress
- Mike Watson, poker player
- David Wells, politician
- Ed White, professional wrestler
- Alonza J. White, lawyer and politician
- Danny Williams, politician
- Harold Williams, geologist
- Neil Windsor, politician
- Jacqueline Winsor, sculptor
- Michael Winter, author

== Y ==
- Andrew Younghusband, television personality, writer and journalist

== See also ==
- List of people from Newfoundland and Labrador
