= List of people from Newfoundland and Labrador =

Provincial flag of Newfoundland and Labrador

This is a list of notable people who are from Newfoundland and Labrador, Canada, or have spent a large part or formative part of their career in that province. This list also includes people associated with the former English, and later British colony of Newfoundland and the dominion of Newfoundland.

== A ==
- Acoutsina, Indigenous historical figure
- Mike Adam, curler
- William G. Adams, lawyer, politician, judge
- Frederick C. Alderdice, entrepreneur, politician
- Dr. Frederick Allen Aldrich, scientist, educator
- Honourable John Anderson, politician
- Ralph LeMoine Andrews, Order of Canada
- John Bartlett Angel, engineer
- Frank C. Archibald, politician
- Thomas Gordon William Ashbourne, politician
- Charles Robert Ayre, businessman, politician
- Honourable John Bray Ayre, politician
- James Stewart Ayre, politician
- Lewis H.M. Ayre, entrepreneur

== B ==
- Honourable James Baird, merchant, member of Legislative Council
- George S. Baker, politician
- Charles Ballam, politician
- Rex Barnes, politician
- Robert Bartlett, explorer
- Herman Maxwell Batten, politician
- Charles Fox Bennett, politician
- Jordan Bennett, artist
- David Blackwood, artist
- Eric Blackwood, aviator
- Rick Boland, actor and filmmaker
- Robert Bond, politician
- Charles R Bowring, merchant, politician
- Frederick Gordon Bradley, politician
- Cyprian Bridge, Royal Navy officer
- D'Arcy Broderick, musician, singer
- Cassie Brown, author
- Keith Brown, hockey player
- Peter Brown, politician
- William Joseph Browne, politician
- Johnny Burke, songwriter, musician
- Brian Byrne, musician
- Ed Byrne, politician
- Gerry Byrne, politician

== C ==
- Andrew Carnell, politician
- William Carson, entrepreneur, doctor
- Chesley William Carter, politician
- Frederick Carter, colonial premier
- Walter C. Carter, politician
- Michael Patrick Cashin, governor
- Peter John Cashin, politician, entrepreneur, soldier
- Richard Cashin, lawyer, politician, trade union leader
- Robert Chafe, playwright
- Andrew Chatwood, politician
- Frederick George Chislett, athlete, entrepreneur
- Daniel Cleary, hockey player (Detroit Red Wings)
- Al Clouston, storyteller, humorist
- Frances Cluett, nurse
- Siobhan Coady, entrepreneur, politician
- William Coaker, trade union leader, politician
- Ethel Cochrane, senator
- Bob Cole, television announcer
- Henry Collingwood, entrepreneur
- Randy Collins, politician
- Ern Condon, politician
- Joan Cook, senator
- Michael Cook, playwright
- William Cormack, Scottish explorer, philanthropist, author
- Charles Cozens, politician
- Mark Critch, comedian
- John Crosbie, lawyer, politician, lieutenant governor
- Michael Crummey, writer
- Amy Curlew, ice hockey player

== D ==
- Charles Dawe, politician, merchant
- Tom Dawe, writer
- Dax, rapper
- Demasduit, Indigenous historical figure
- Ethel Dickenson, educator, nurse
- Molly Dingle, educator
- Donald B. Dingwell, scientist, science administrator, educator
- Craig Dobbin, industrialist
- William Doody, politician
- Alan Doyle, singer, musician
- Damhnait Doyle, singer, musician
- Norman Doyle, politician
- Sam Drover, politician
- Karyn Dwyer, actress
- Gwynne Dyer, journalist, syndicated columnist, military historian

== E ==
- John Efford, politician
- Carl English, basketball shooting guard
- Leif Erickson, explorer

== F ==
- Fonse Faour, politician
- Alex Faulkner, hockey player (Detroit Red Wings)
- Grunia Movschovitch Ferman, entrepreneur, activist
- Adele Fifield, amputee, member of Order of Ontario
- Eugene Forsey, politician
- James Patrick Fox, politician
- George Furey, politician

== G ==
- Jenny Gear, singer
- Irma Gerd, drag performer (Canada's Drag Race)
- Michael Gibbs, lawyer, politician
- Deidre Gillard-Rowlings, actress
- Augustus F. Goodridge, governor
- Armine Nutting Gosling, suffragette
- Philip Henry Gosse, entomologist, naturalist
- Rex Goudie, singer
- Charles Granger, politician
- Jason Greeley, singer
- Daniel J. Greene, governor
- Roger Grimes, politician
- Brad Gushue, curler
- Ray Guy, humorist
- Sandra Gwyn, journalist, writer

== H ==
- Jennifer Hale, voice actress
- Bob Hallett, musician
- Violetta Maloney Halpert, folklorist, veteran
- Ofra Harnoy, concert cellist
- Ewart John Arlington Harnum, lieutenant governor
- Jack Harris, politician
- Jonny Harris, actor/comedian
- Ann Harvey, rescuer
- Kenneth J. Harvey, author, journalist, photographer, filmmaker
- Carolyn Hayward, bullfighter, artist
- Ferd Hayward, athlete, Olympian
- Loyola Hearn, politician
- Natasha Henstridge, actress
- Albert Hickman, politician, businessman
- Alexander Hickman, lawyer, politician, judge
- General Rick Hillier, chief of Defense Staff, Canadian Forces
- Harold Horwood, novelist, writer
- Arthur Maxwell House, politician, lieutenant governor
- Danielle House, dethroned beauty queen
- Ann Hulan, colonist, entrepreneur, agriculturalist
- Gudie Hutchings, politician
- Joel Thomas Hynes, author/actor
- Ron Hynes, singer/songwriter
- Thomas Hynes, fisherman, fugitive and protester

== J ==
- Donald Campbell Jamieson, politician
- Sylvester Joe, hunter, explorer
- Morrissey Johnson, politician
- Paul Johnson, philanthropist, businessman
- Wayne Johnston, novelist
- Andy Jones, actor, comedian
- Cathy Jones, actress, comedian

== K ==
- Abram Kean, mariner and sealing captain
- Max Keeping, newscaster and member of the Order of Canada
- John Kent, politician
- Steve Kent, politician
- Susan Kent, actor and comedian
- Jason King, professional hockey player
- Mary Bernard Kirwan, educator, religious leader
- Jamie Korab, curler

== L ==
- Darren Langdon, hockey player
- Walter Learning, actor, director, playwright
- Graham Letto, politician
- Gene Long, politician
- John Howard Lundrigan, politician

== M ==
- Kevin Major, children's author
- Shaun Majumder, comedian, actor
- Greg Malone, impressionist, actor
- Sean McCann, musician
- Desmond McGrath, priest, trade union organizer, politician
- James McGrath, politician, lieutenant governor
- Alexander James Whiteford McNeilly, politician, lawyer
- Rick Mercer, comedian
- Fred J. Mifflin, rear admiral, politician
- Mattie Mitchell, Mi’kmaq chieftain, guide, prospector, and explorer
- Walter Stanley Monroe, governor
- Lisa Moore, writer
- Rob Moore, politician, lawyer
- Frank Moores, politician
- Patrick Moran, musician
- Bernice Morgan, novelist
- Moses Morgan, academic, Order of Canada
- Francis Morris, politician, lawyer and judge
- Donna Morrissey, author
- John Joseph Murphy, politician, businessman
- Rex Murphy, journalist
- Alexander Murray, geologist
- Hilda Chaulk Murray, author

== N ==
- Alex Newhook, NHL hockey player
- Mark Nichols, curler
- Walter Noel, politician
- Dick Nolan, singer, songwriter, guitarist
- Nonosabasut, Indigenous chief
- Peg Norman, politician, abortion activist, lesbian activist
- Calvin Normore, philosophy professor
- Dwayne Norris, NHL, Olympic hockey player
- Warren Norris, AHL hockey player
- Joseph W. Noseworthy, politician
- Tara Nova, drag performer (Canada's Drag Race)

== O ==
- Lawrence D. O'Brien, politician
- Fergus O'Byrne, musician
- Brian O'Dea, criminal
- Joseph Phillip O'Keefe, politician
- Seamus O'Regan, politician and former television personality; ex-host of Canada AM

== P ==
- William Anthony Paddon, lieutenant-governor
- Jean Payne, politician
- Jim Payne, folk singer
- Brian Peckford, politician
- Mark Peddle, musician
- John Peyton, fisherman
- Gordon Pinsent, actor
- Robert John Pinsent, magistrate, judge
- Al Pittman, writer
- Helen Fogwill Porter, author, activist
- Darrell Power
- Greg Power, politician, farmer, poet, athlete
- James Power, politician
- Tom Power, broadcaster, musician
- Christopher Pratt, artist, painter
- E. J. Pratt, poet
- Joseph Price, politician
- Daniel Woodley Prowse, lawyer, politician

== Q ==
- Herman William Quinton, senator

== R ==
- Ian Angus Ross Reid, politician
- Robert Gillespie Reid, railway contractor
- Thomas Ricketts, soldier, Victoria Cross
- Thomas Rideout, politician
- Edward Roberts, politician, lieutenant governor
- Gordon Rodgers, writer
- Gerry Rogers, filmmaker, politician
- Isabella Whiteford Rogerson, poet, philanthropist
- Bill Rompkey, politician, senator
- Frederick Russell, businessman, former lieutenant governor
- Kelly Russell, musician
- Ted Russell, author, playwright, comedian
- Todd Russell, politician
- James M. Ryan, businessman
- Terry Ryan, NHL hockey player
- Michael Ryder, NHL hockey player

== S ==
- Arthur Scammell, teacher and composer, wrote "Squid-Jiggin' Ground"
- Tommy Sexton, actor
- Shanawdithit, Indigenous historical figure, last known survivor of the Beothuk
- Craig Sharpe, singer
- Ambrose Shea, politician
- George Shea, politician
- John Shiwak, Inuk, Newfoundland Regiment sniper during WWI
- Roger Simmons, politician
- Scott Simms, politician
- Joey Smallwood, politician
- Catherine Mandeville Snow, last woman hanged in NL
- Rod Snow, Canadian Rugby International
- Squanto, Indigenous historical figure
- Gerald Squires, artist
- Richard Squires, politician
- Const. Frank Stamp, policeman, boxer
- Harry Steele, naval officer and businessman
- Geoff Stirling, businessman
- Georgina Stirling, opera singer
- Loyola Sullivan, politician

== T ==
- William Taverner, plantation owner, surveyor
- Myra Louise Taylor, nurse
- William Thomas, politician
- Greg Thomey, comedian
- Brian Tobin, politician
- Mary Widdicombe Travers, hotelier
- James Roy Tucker, politician
- Otto Tucker, author, educator
- Beaton Tulk, politician
- Shannon Lee Tweed, actress, Playboy model

== U ==
- Abraham Ulrikab, Inuk from Labrador, fisherman, died in Europe

== W ==
- Tracey Waddleton, writer
- Michael Walker, economist
- Agnes Walsh, poet, playwright, oral historian
- Albert Walsh, commissioner, chief justice and Lieutenant-Governor of Newfoundland, 1949
- William Warren, lawyer, politician, judge
- Andy Wells, politician
- Clyde Wells, politician
- Ed "Sailor" White, wrestler, politician
- Minnie White, accordionist
- Danny Williams, politician
- Harold (Hank) Williams, geologist
- Percival Willoughby, land owner
- Gordon Arnaud Winter, lieutenant governor
- James Spearman Winter, politician, premier
- Michael Winter, writer

== See also ==
- List of writers from Newfoundland and Labrador
- List of people from St. John's, Newfoundland and Labrador
- List of communities in Newfoundland and Labrador
- Dictionary of Canadian Biography
- List of Canadians
- List of Canadian painters
- List of Canadians by net worth
- List of Mauriciens
- List of Irish Quebecers
