= Catholic sisters and nuns in Canada =

Catholic sisters and nuns in Canada have been an important presence since the 17th century.

== Quebec ==
Outside the home, Canadian women had few domains which they controlled. An important exception came with Roman Catholic nuns, especially in Québec. Stimulated by the influence in France, the popular religiosity of the Counter Reformation, new orders for women began appearing in the seventeenth century. In the next three centuries women opened dozens of independent religious orders, funded in part by dowries provided by the parents of young nuns. The orders specialized in charitable works, including hospitals, orphanages, homes for unwed mothers, and schools.

The Ursuline Sisters arrived in Quebec City in 1639, and in Montreal in 1641, as well as small towns. They had to overcome harsh conditions, uncertain funding, and unsympathetic authorities as they engaged in educational and nursing functions. They attracted endowments and became important landowners in Quebec. Marie de l'Incarnation (1599-1672) was the mother superior at Quebec, 1639–72.

Numerous orders came over from France. In the region near Saint-Bruno-de-Montarville, near Montreal, the main schools were set up by the Ordre des Trinitaires (Trinitarian Order) for men, and the religieuses des Sacrés-Coeurs et de l'adoration perpétuelle (nuns of the Sacred Hearts and perpetual adoration) for women.

The Church in Quebec invested heavily in confidence in the late 19th century. In 1850 there were about 600 nuns, by 1900 there were 6500. Some were in contemplative orders; but the majority staffed church institutions, especially elementary schools, hospitals, asylums, and orphanages. Boarding schools were especially popular, and by 1900 to hundred of them attracted 11 percent of all female students in Québec.

In 1910, 850 sisters from different orders taught in the province's high schools and elementary schools.

The traditionalism of some orders conflicted with new theories in psychiatry, as seen in the case of the Sisters of Providence, who in 1873 founded the Saint-Jean-de-Dieu a large asylum for the insane. There were over 6000 admissions from 1873 to 1900, most from urban areas although Quebec was heavily rural. A fire killed 46 girls in 1916. The congregation renewed its contract with the Quebec government in 1924. The sisters saw their mission to feed, maintain, treat and rehabilitate mental patients. During the 1940s and 1950s, however, the inter-personal and inter-professional relations between the sisters and a group of young psychiatrists, the "modernists," became increasingly strained, The suitable therapeutic environment fell victim to political interests within the institution, according to the 1962 Bédard Report on the status of psychiatric hospitals in Quebec.

In the first half of the twentieth century, about 2-3% of Québec's young women became nuns; there were 6600 in 1901, and 26,000 in 1941. In Québec in 1917, 32 teaching orders operated 586 boarding schools for girls. At that time there was no public education for girls in Québec beyond elementary school. Hospitals were another specialty, the first of which was founded in 1701. In 1936, the nuns of Québec operated 150 institutions, with 30,000 beds to care for the long-term sick, the homeless, and orphans. On a smaller scale, Catholic orders of nuns operated similar institutions in other provinces.

== Newfoundland ==
In 1833 at the request of Bishop Michael Anthony Fleming, the Presentation Sisters came to Newfoundland from Galway and opened a school for children. Within weeks the sisters were inundated with new pupils, the children of the Irish of St. John's, who saw education as the best means of economic and social advancement. In 1842, Fleming invited the Sisters of Mercy to come to teach girls and to help create a Catholic middle class. The Presentation Sisters, Mother Mary Bernard Kirwan accompanied by Sisters Mary Xavier Molony, Josephine French and M. de Sales Lovelock came in 1833 and established a school next to the convent. This school is still in operation. The motherhouse was established at St. John's adjacent to the Basilica of St. John the Baptist.

== Nova Scotia ==
The Sisters of Charity of Saint Vincent de Paul (Halifax) were founded in 1849 in Halifax, Nova Scotia from New York; this has been designated a National Historic Event. They came in response to a request by then Archbishop of Halifax William Walsh. By 1856, the order in Halifax was accepted as a separate congregation by Pope Pius IX and took on their new official name. The order is part of the Sisters of Charity Federation which includes a number of congregations using the "Sisters of Charity" umbrella.

== New Brunswick ==
New Brunswick had a francophone Catholic element that supported institutions run by sisters. The Académie Sainte-Famille was a school in the remote town of Tracadie, New Brunswick, operated by the Religieuses Hospitalières de Saint-Joseph. The institution from time to time also included an orphanage and a hospital for patients with leprosy, from its founding in 1873 until the closure in 1967.

The bishop of Halifax in 1854 invited an American congregation to begin operations in the province. The Sisters of Charity were based in Saint John where they conducted an orphanage for girls and a home for the aged. They had numerous smaller charitable activities in smaller towns, such as a boys' industrial school at Silver Fall. They taught all the Catholic girls in the public schools. They operated a high school in Saint John; some graduates went on to the Provincial Normal School or the University of New Brunswick.

== Ontario ==
Bishop Armand-François-Marie de Charbonnel of Toronto (1847 to 1860) moved energetically to develop a comprehensive program of reform affecting clergy and laity in the diocese of Toronto. It warned against the dangers of mixed marriages and heretical books, he imposed uniform discipline, clergy, and he sought out congregations from Europe, both male and female, who would staff the expanding diocese. He brought in nuns from France and the United States. His successors continued his work, and by 1889, the diocese had 293 sisters, about half belonging to the French-based Sisters of St. Joseph.

== Since 1960 ==
Radical changes have happened since the 1960s. The Quiet Revolution in Quebec in the 1960s combined declericalization with the dramatic reforms of Vatican II in 1962–65. There was a dramatic change in the role of nuns. Many left the convent while very few young women entered. The Provincial government took over the nuns' traditional role as provider of many of Quebec's education and social services. Often ex-nuns continued in the same roles in civilian dress.

Representative was the experience of the Sisters of Charity from Halifax, Nova Scotia after 1970. The order continued its historic role specializing in education, health care, and social services. However it lost many of its leaders, and very few young women joined. It responded by selling off its property, discontinuing cloistered community living and regular group prayer, and dispensing with habits. It expanded its ministry. The areas of education, health care, pastoral ministry and social services are still paramount, though the ways in which the sisters work within a given field has changed. While the congregation once operated hospitals, schools, senior citizen homes and the only women's university in Canada, they now serve in a variety of areas in Canada and throughout the eastern United States, in Bermuda, Peru and the Dominican Republic. The order founded Canada's best known women's university, now co-educational, Mount Saint Vincent University in Halifax, Nova Scotia. A long tradition ended in 2006 when Sister Sheelagh Martin, a chemistry professor, retired as the last member of the congregation to teach there.

== See also ==
- Catholic sisters and nuns in the United States
- History of Canadian women
- Nuns
- Roman Catholicism in Canada
