= General Protestant Cemetery =

Historic site in St. John's, Newfoundland and Labrador

Coordinates: 47°32′40″N 52°43′29″W

The General Protestant Cemetery is an historic cemetery located in St. John's, Newfoundland and Labrador. It is located on the side of the shallow Waterford River valley and is bounded on the upper (north) side by Old Topsail Road and on the lower side by Waterford Bridge Road.

== History ==
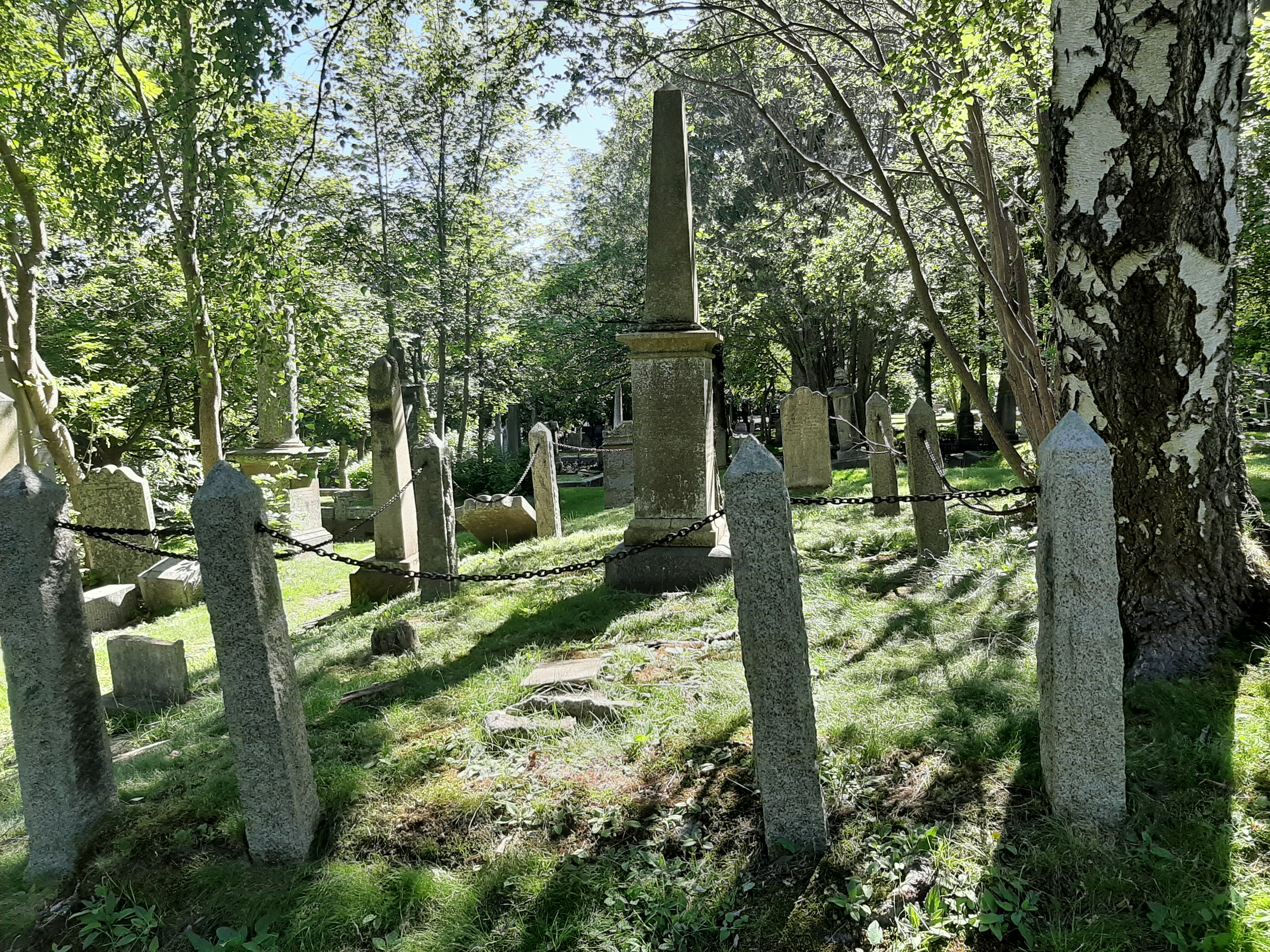
Rogerson family vault at the General Protestant Cemetery, one of two underground vaults to be found in the cemetery

Located between Waterford Bridge Road and Old Topsail Road in St. John's, Newfoundland and Labrador, the General Protestant Cemetery officially opened May 25, 1849. Burials within the St. John's city limits were forbidden by 1849 due to the passing of "An Act to Prohibit Interments within the Town of St. John's", making the General Protestant Cemetery, then on the outskirts of town, a desirable area for burials. It was once referred to as the River Head Cemetery.

The cemetery is designed as a Victorian garden cemetery with many of the oldest trees in the city. The earliest marker in the cemetery is for John Butt who died May 15, 1842. It appears that this person had likely been buried in another cemetery and then later moved to the General Protestant Cemetery after it opened. The opening of the cemetery coincided with the establishment of the first commercial headstone and memorial companies on the island, and the cemetery contains stones carved by early professional makers such as Alexander Smith, Charles Muir, and Frederick George Chislett. Possibly the earliest signed headstone in the province is in the cemetery, carved by maker James Grey for someone who died in 1836 (another possible reburial).

While the cemetery is primarily used and intended for Protestant burials, it also contains plots for those of other faiths. These include plots for members of the Salvation Army, Judaism, Buddhism, and Taoism. Circa 1988, 50 plots on the southwest corner of the cemetery were given to the local Muslim community; by 2013 there were only 3 or 4 open Muslim plots remaining.

By the 1940s, plots were becoming scarce, and the main cemetery for those of Protestant faith became the Mount Pleasant Cemetery on Hamilton Avenue. The cemetery is still in limited use today, though the majority of the plots that remain are family-owned.

== Burials ==
=== Chinese ===
There are twenty seven Chinese graves in the General Protestant Cemetery marking the burial sites of early Chinese immigrants to St. John's, Newfoundland and Labrador. Newfoundland and Labrador did not have a large Chinese presence until the late 19th century, and they predominately worked in hand laundries. The graves all belong to men. Due to the Chinese Head Tax of and Chinese exclusion act of 1906, immigration from China was restricted to men and from the same region of southern China.

The headstones in this section show a mix of English and Chinese inscriptions. These inscriptions show that all those interred in the cemetery were from Guangdong, a southern province in China. Some of the headstones appear with romanized names of those interred. It is not known how these individuals received romanized names, though some speculate that Anglicized names were used to make their names more recognizable and pronounceable to the English-speaking population of St. John's. Some of the members are given English nicknames, and one burial is recorded as "Jack Chinese."

These early Chinese burials represent a highly Christianized practice, and may reflect not only a temporary strategy to be accepted into their new community, but also as a new way of life. The graves include that of murder victim Eng Wing Kit, who was killed in St. John's in 1938.

=== Notable interments ===
- Margaret Peace, Poet
- Isabella Whiteford Rogerson, Poet as well as early social activist
- Mary Mann Pitts, Social activist
- Patrick Tasker, instrumental in establishing freemasonry and a public health board in St. John's.
- Harold MacPherson, Member of Newfoundland's Upper House
- Samuel Milley, Member of Newfoundland's Upper House
- Robert E. Holloway, Principal of Methodist College for 32 years, photographer
- Albert Edgar Hickman, Prime Minister of Newfoundland (1924-1924)
- Sir Richard Squires, Prime Minister of Newfoundland (1919-1923 1928-1932)
- Helena Squires, wife of Sir Richard Squires, first women to sit in the House of Assembly
- John Browning, prominent businessman and politician
- Sir Robert Thorburn, Premier of the Colony of Newfoundland (1885-1889)
- Chesley Crosbie, notable businessman and politician
- Sir John Chalker Crosbie, Prime Minister of Newfoundland (1917-1918)
- John Crosbie, notable politician, businessman, and Lieutenant Governor (2008-2013)
- Col. Cluny Macpherson, inventor of the gas mask.

== See also ==
- Commonwealth War Graves Commission
