= Anderson House (St. John's) =

Coordinates: 47°34′21.14″N 52°41′43.75″W

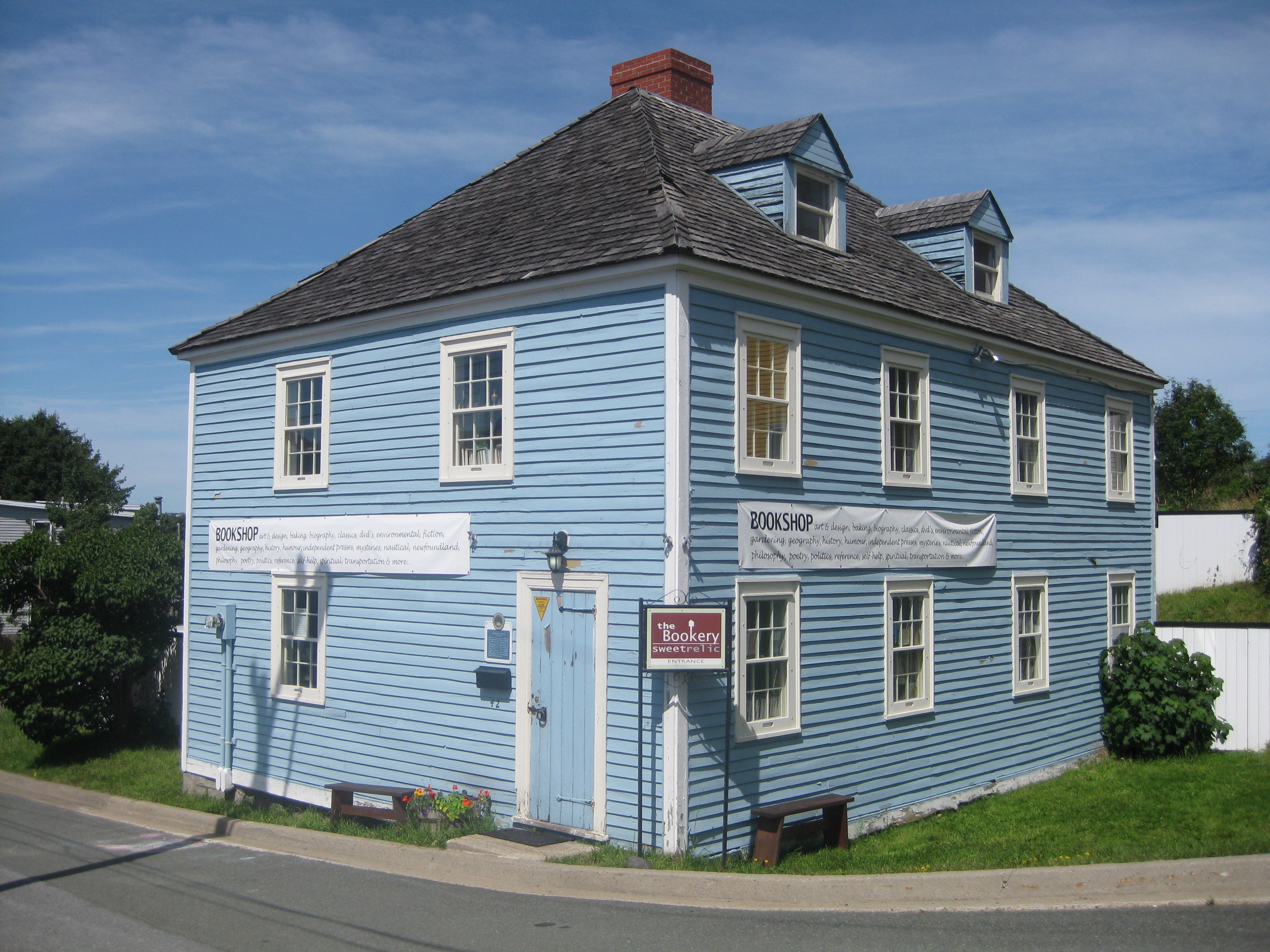

General information
- Location: 42 Powers Court, St. John's, Newfoundland and Labrador, Canada
- Completed: Circa 1804

Design and construction
- Engineer: James Anderson

Anderson House is a wooden, two and one half storey hip roofed heritage-designated building located at 42 Powers Court, St. John's, Newfoundland and Labrador. It is a Vernacular Georgian style building and is reported to be one of the oldest structures in the city of St. John's.

== History ==
The house is of modest construction and an excellent example of 19th-century homes. It was built on land that was purchased from Dr. Jonathan Ogden, a Newfoundland chief justice, in 1802. It was constructed circa 1803-1804, possibly for Sergeant James Anderson. The date is suggested by two notes in the Governor’s Correspondence, a 1803 permission to build a barn on the property and a 1804 permission to building a dwelling house. Little is known about Anderson's military history, though he is listed as a Bombardier with the Royal Regiment of Artillery stationed at St. John's in 1797 and as a Sergeant by 1811.

Anderson held land in that area at least by 1808, as in September 1819, the Newfoundland Mercantile Journal gave notice of the public auction of a property lot in the vicinity of the upper part of Maggoty Cove, Signal Hill: "The freehold of a field adjoining Lot No, 14, now in the occupancy of Mr. James Anderson, and by him held under a lease, of which 11 years will be unexpired on the 1st November next, at the yearly rent of £7 10." An 1849 map shows the house sitting on what is called "Anderson's Ground."

Oral history maintains the house was used both as a private residence and as a military barracks with a section of the house used to stable horses. While Anderson's military career is not well documented, multiple newspaper accounts from the era show him to be an entrepreneur, renting and developing properties, selling goods including turnips, carrots, parsnips, firewood, and timothy seed.

In 1818, Anderson opened the "St. Johns’ Spruce Beer Brewery" at the upper wharf of John Dunscome on the St. John's waterfront. By May 1842 he had expanded his business to include "Temperance Liquor" including spruce beer and hop porter, sold out of his brewery at Half-way-house, Signal Hill Road, which could have been Anderson’s circa 1803 barn or one of his other houses.

Anderson died on St. Valentine’s Day, 14 February 1852 at age 84, and was survived by his wife, Catherine.

In 1860, the house was purchased from Catherine Anderson by Henry C. Tillman (1824-1862). Born in Halifax to German immigrants, Tillmann (his name also appears as Charles Henry Tillman, Charles J. Tillmann, and Henry H. Tillmann) was professor of music and composer, who arrived in St. John's in 1843/4 from Halifax, where he had served as organist of St. Mary's Cathedral. Tillmann was the composer of "The Newfoundland Camp Gallopade" in 1853. He worked as a music instructor in St. John's for 18 years, and it was written that "His skill in the practice of his profession, that of a musical teacher, was universally admitted, and his unassuming and affable manners endeared him to his friends and all! who had the pleasure of his acquaintance." Tillmann and his St. John's-born wife Mary (née Dalton) had six children; their youngest, Henry Hermann, died age 4 1/2 less than a month before Tillmann's own death on 30 July 1862. Mary Dalton Tillmann (1827–1895), widow of Henry, sold the property to John Power some time between 1862 and 1864 and moved to New York. She died in Halifax on 27 October 1895.

In 1878, the property was sold by John Power to Patrick Power. At some point the property passed from a Mary Power to her husband, William Finlay, who owned the property at least to 1970. The building was at one time following this owned by the Roman Catholic Episcopal Corporation of St. John's.

== Restoration and Heritage Designation ==
After 1972, the building began to decay rapidly. In 1973, it was noted that in spite of a fire a number of years previously, the interior of the building was fairly intact, including a simple spiral staircase and two open fireplaces. In 1974, St. John's heritage advocate Shane O'Dea wrote:

An unusual feature of the house, apart from its age, is the fact that most of its internal fabric is the same as it was when the house was first built over a century and a half ago. In the kitchen is the large open fireplace with coal grate and crane for cooking. In the rooms above are fire-places with what appear to be their original mantels. An interesting staircase climbs from the ground floor to the attic in the western end of the house and the entire attic seems to be unchanged -- doors, latches, floor, walls even the paint appear to be the original.

In 1976, following a four-year campaign to save the building, the Newfoundland Historic Trust purchased the building and entered into an agreement with The Architect's Guild to restore the building. On 7 October of that year, shortly after the Trust signed the papers to take over the empty building, another fire caused serious damage to the structure. Between 1977-78, much of the building was restored, and an eastern addition (which possibly served as the stable) was removed. The work was primarily directed by Enid Sylvia Cullum (?-2005) and her architect husband Charles Cullum (1927-2013). In 1979, Sylvia wrote,

The east end of the building, which was of a later date, was torn down as it was felt to be too damaged by fire to be rebuilt, and the house re-emerged in its original shape.It was made watertight and a roof of wooden shingles was put on....Wooden siding had to be re- placed and the windows re-glazed and part of the chimney rebuilt using old bricks from a demolished bank on Duckworth Street to replace those that were too rotten to re-use.

Interior work included plastering, exposing wall boards of rough cut hemlock, sourcing and replacing mouldings, scraping and repainting mantels, researching and painting in historic colours, and completely refurbishing the staircase. Charles Cullum received an inaugural Southcott Award from the Newfoundland Historic Trust for his dedication to the preservation of St. John's over the course of many years, including restoration work on Anderson House. In 1984, it was noted that the building had been preserved "as a distinctive set of offices with much of the atmosphere and charm of... earlier times."

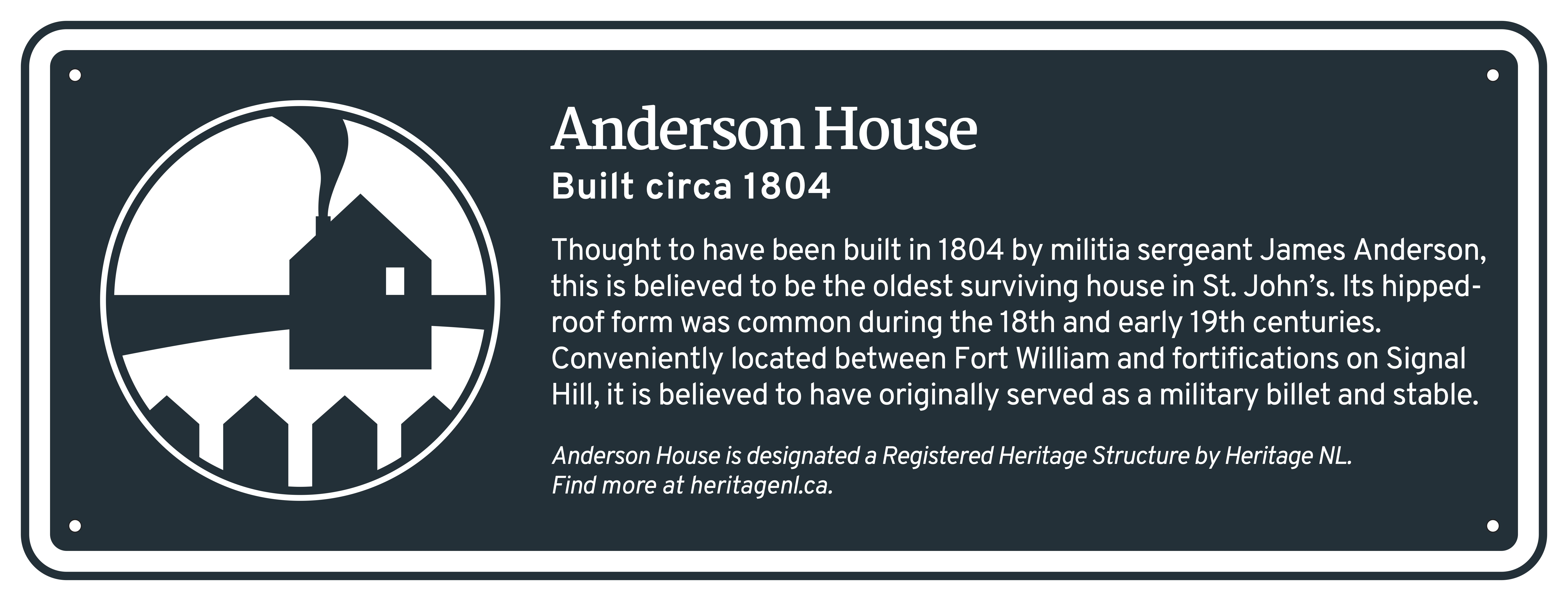
Plaque for the Anderson House Registered Heritage Structure, St. John's, NL, Canada

On 23 March 1996, the Anderson House was designated as a Registered Heritage Structure by the Heritage Foundation of Newfoundland and Labrador. A plaque was affixed in 1998, and updated in 2022. The building was listed on the Canadian Register of Historic Places 2 February 2005.

From circa 2009-2011, the building was occupied by The Bookery, a short-lived independent bookstore. In 2014, the property was home to Innovative Development & Design Engineers, Ltd., an engineering consulting company, and then owner Hubert Alacoque was presented the Southcott Award for architectural preservation. On 27 January 2017, the building was designated as a Heritage Building by the St. John's Municipal Council.
