= Chislett =

Chislett is a surname. Notable people with the surname include:

- Anne Chislett (born 1942), Canadian playwright
- Ethan Chislett (born 1998), South African-born footballer in England
- Frederick George Chislett (born c1880), Canadian athlete and entrepreneur
- Laura Chislett, Australian flute player
- Michael Guy Chislett (born 1982), Australian musician and producer
