= Perlin =

Perlin may refer to:

- Perlin, Germany, municipality in Mecklenburg-Vorpommern, Germany
- Perlin (surname)
- Perlin (falconry), hybrid between a peregrine falcon and a merlin
- Perlin noise, computer graphics technique

== See also ==
- Purlin, in building construction, a horizontal roof member
