= Perlin (surname) =

- Amy Perlin, American rabbi
- Bernard Perlin (1918–2014), American painter
- Don Perlin (1929–2024), American comic book artist
- Evgeny Perlin (born 1990), Belarusian journalist and television presenter
- Gary Perlin, American chief financial officer
- Jenny Perlin (born 1970), American artist
- Ken Perlin, American computer scientist
- Marshall Perlin (1920–1998), American lawyer
- Rae Perlin (1910–2006), Newfoundlander painter
- Vera Perlin (1902–1974), Canadian human rights activist
- Vladimir Perlin (born 1942), Belarusian cellist
