= Acoutsina =

Enslaved Inuit (c. 1697 – after 1719)

Acoutsina (Note: Also spelt Acountsina and Akutsinaaq) (c. 1697 – after 1719), was an Inuk from Labrador who was enslaved by Augustin le Gardeur de Courtemanche. During her captivity she taught François Martel de Brouague, his stepson and a French colonist and commandant of the coast of Labrador, the language of her people, while she learned French. After a few years in captivity, her father came to the fort and secured her release. Historians analyse records of her captivity for information on French-Indigenous relationships.

== Heritage and family ==
It is difficult to ascertain the heritage of Acoutsina due to the limited information that exists from this area at this period in history. The French adopted the term "Eskimo" from the indigenous people in North America, but their use of the word referred to several Nordic Amerindian groups in the area, including the Naskapi and the Beothuk, who are not part of the Eskimo group. Jacques Rousseau, a professor of ethnobiology, asserts that Acoutsina was part of the Eskimo people and not Naskapi or Beothuk, due to the translation of her name from the language, her instruction of the Eskimo language to children, and the Eskimo cultural practices that she is recorded to have demonstrated.

Acoutsina's father was Ouibignaro, a chief of the Inuit. She described Inuit customs and legends to the Europeans.

== Capture ==
French ports on the Strait of Belle Isle were established by the early 18th century and they hoped to develop relationships with the local indigenous communities to enhance the fur trade. The commandant at the Baie de Phélypeaux, Augustin Le Gardeur de Courtemanche, met with the Inuit in the fall of 1716 and convinced them to return the following spring to trade furs. The Inuit returned the following May and camped near the fort. Courtemanche tried to extort the indigenous group, threatening to shoot at them, so the Inuit retreated to their boats and shot arrows at the French. The French grabbed a boat and pulled four people from the boat, including Acoutsina.

== Captivity ==
Acoutsina was kept at the fort as deterrence against Indigenous attacks. One month after her capture, de Courtemanche died and his stepson, Brouague, took over the commandant position for the fort. Acoutsina was placed under the care of Courtemanche's wife, and Acoutsina later recounted to other Inuit that she was always near Madame Courtemanche, who protected Acoutsina from harm. Acoutsina taught her language to Brouague and was tasked with domestic work. Information about Acoutsina is found in letters written by Brouague. He wrote that Acoutsina desired to return to her family in 1718.

While living in the port Acoutsina learned some French and described Inuit traditions, mythology, and legends. She also described how Europeans integrated into the Inuit group, including a shipwrecked sailor that the Inuit called "good old Nicolas".

== Release ==
In September 1719, Inuit came to Île aux Bois. Brouague went to meet with them and brought Acoutsina with him. After the meeting, Ouibignaro, who was Acoutsina's father, and 30 Inuit travelled with Brouague and Acoutsina back to the fort to attend a feast. In the fort, Acoutsina demonstrated aspects of the Catholic mass for the indigenous people. Ouibignaro asked that Acoutsina and the other girl who was captured with Acoutsina to be returned to their fellow Inuit; Brouague obliged. Acoutsina was given gifts and food from Madame Courtmanche.

Another Inuk chief, Camerlique, declared that Acoutsina and the French household should be killed. Acoutsina was distressed over this declaration and she was reassured that this would not happen. Instead, the Inuit promised not to stop burning the French fishermen's ships. The fort's chaplain gave Acoutsina a book so that she could demonstrate her knowledge of the French language to her people. She departed with the indigenous people, and there are no further records of her.

== Legacy ==
After leaving, Acoutsina and the Inuit did not return to the French fort and continued to destroy French boats.

Records of Acoutsina's statements have allowed historians to analyse the diplomatic relationship between Inuit and Europeans in the sixteenth century.

== See also ==
- List of people of Newfoundland and Labrador
