= Wessex Society of Newfoundland and Labrador =

The Wessex Society of Newfoundland and Labrador is a not-for-profit, volunteer-run organization established to promote Newfoundland and Labrador's connections with the West Country of England, and to celebrate other ethnocultural traditions in Newfoundland and Labrador. The organization was officially charted 25 October 1984 by educator and heritage activist Otto Tucker to facilitate "understanding of Newfoundland's origins in southwest England." Its UK-based sister organization is the similarly-named Wessex Newfoundland Society.

== History of organization ==
What would become the Wessex Society started in 1983 as a group of people interested in the roots connecting people in the province of Newfoundland and Labrador to the West Country of England. After a meeting in St. John's, Newfoundland and Labrador, a decision was made to set up an association promoting this interest and the sharing of knowledge on related topics. In 1984, it was decided that "a charter night should be selected in order that the society be publicly instituted." This meeting was held 25 October 1984 at Memorial University of Newfoundland, with the organization named the Wessex Society of Newfoundland, with the official aim of the society "to stimulate an interest in, and knowledge of, Newfoundland origins in the West Country of England."

The idea to use the name Wessex for the society was suggested by Dr. W. Gordon Handcock, cultural geographer and professor of geography at Memorial University of Newfoundland and Labrador, based on Thomas Hardy's Wessex. Of the known English immigrants who settled in Newfoundland throughout the seventeenth and eighteenth centuries, about 80% originated in the southern and southwestern regions of England, and half of these came from Wessex. In 2007, Tucker noted,

The majority of people in this province have ancestors who came from the west country of England, called Wessex, which includes the Dorset, Devon, Somerset and Wiltshire areas. I thought people all over Newfoundland of Wessex origin were sort of losing their understanding of their origins.

Founding members of the organization included: Otto Tucker, president; Reverend Canon George Earle, honorary president; Cyril Poole, vice president; W. Gordon Handcock, secretary-treasurer; and Hon. Brian Peckford, patron. Other notable members have included Aidan Joseph Maloney, who served as honorary vice-chairman. Tucker served as president for 22 years, and was replaced by former corresponding secretary Arthur Cleal.

== Society accomplishments ==
=== Sister society ===
Peter J. Coles founded a sister society in Poole, England. The society was founded on 18 March 1985 and was called the Wessex Newfoundland Society. One of the aims of the society is to, "broaden the mutual understanding of the historical, social, cultural, educational, recreational, civic and commercial activities of the linked areas by the exchange of information and development of personal contacts."

During the first meeting in Poole, "Dr. Tucker, representing the province, extended greetings and presented the group with a Dictionary of Newfoundland English as well as a Newfoundland flag." The dictionary was presented as dialectical characteristics of West Country English heavily influenced the development of Newfoundland and Labrador English and scholars have noted the "linguistic ties of Newfoundland to the old country."

The two groups have met several times in Newfoundland, and the Wessex Newfoundland Society has helped Newfoundland families connect to their UK roots. In 2021, following declining membership, it was suggested the Wessex Newfoundland Society merge with The Society for Poole (SfP).

=== Lester Garland House ===
In 1983, Otto Tucker visited Dorset, England as a commentator for a CBC film focused on the Newfoundland and Labrador connection to Dorset. There, he met Alan Perry and sparked in Perry an interest in Newfoundland and Labrador and its connections to West Country England. Perry was invited to speak at a meeting of the Historical Trust in Trinity, Newfoundland and Labrador in 1989 and suggested the establishment of a museum which would commemorate the connection between West Country England and Newfoundland and Labrador. While there, he noticed the brick ruins of the Lester Garland house, and broached the idea of rebuilding the property in time for the Cabot Celebrations in 1997. At an address to the Wessex Society, Perry raised the idea of restoring the Lester Garland house in Trinity, Newfoundland and Labrador, and the need for raising a substantial amount of money to make the project happen. Members of the Wessex Society of Newfoundland and Labrador along with the Newfoundland Wessex Society, and Trinity Historical Society raised $1.2-million and 25,000 bricks for the restoration of the house.

=== Thomas Bennett portrait ===
In 1949, shortly following Newfoundland and Labrador's confederation with Canada, then premier Joseph Smallwood commissioned a series of paintings depicting the Speakers of the House from 1833 onwards. Since there was no image available of the second Speaker, Thomas Bennett (1788–1872) his portrait was omitted. The Wessex Society was instrumental in tracking down a photograph of Bennett and corroborating it with genealogical research, so that a portrait could be completed by noted Newfoundland artist Gerald Squires.

=== Public Lecture Series ===
Since its founding, the Wessex Society has "presented four or five speakers a year" including public lectures by local and visiting scholars, authors, and journalists who celebrate and promote Newfoundland and Labrador history and culture, environment, economy, and community life. These lectures have included:

- A Long Journey: Residential Schools in Labrador and Newfoundland, by Andrea Procter, 10 March 2021
- Remembering Remarkable Women, by Susan Chalker Browne, 10 November 2020
- Changing Newfoundland demographics, by Robert Greenwood, 10 April 2019
- The History and Archaeology of Newfoundland Winterhouses, by Stephen Mills, May 2013
- The folklore and legends of Wessex, by Dale Gilbert Jarvis, January 2013
- Thomas Hardy's Wessex and the Newfoundland connection, by Everard King, 13 November 1996
- A Brief History of the Random Region of Trinity Bay, by Leslie Dean, April 1994
- Vernacular Architecture of the West Country of England, by Gerald Pocius, 12 February 1986
- William Barnes of Old Darzet, by Dr. Cyril Poole, inaugural lecture, 25 October 1984
