= Hilda Chaulk Murray =

Hilda Chaulk Murray is the nom-de-plume of Newfoundland author Hilda Emily Louise Murray, née Chaulk.

She was born on February 3, 1934, in Maberly, a small hamlet on the shores of the then country of Newfoundland and which constitutes an integral part of the town of Elliston. In 1960, she married Murdo Murray, a recent Scottish immigrant originally from Ness on the Isle of Lewis. They have three children and four grandchildren.

== Schooling and career ==
Her early schooling, until the age of 16, took place in Maberly. Teaching has always been Mrs. Murray's vocation; having received her B.A.(Ed) in 1954, Miss Chaulk taught in Norris Point (1954–1955), Portugal Cove (1955–1959) and Gander (1959–1963). After marrying in 1960, Mrs. Murray continued teaching at Gander Academy and then she and her husband moved to the St. John's area, choosing to live in the picturesque small town of Mount Pearl (now a much larger city), where she taught at Bishop's College for a few years and then at the College of Trades and Technology (now the College of the North Atlantic) from 1972 until retirement in 1989.
In 1972 she completed her MA in Folklore at Memorial University of Newfoundland under Herbert Halpert and was a classmate of Scottish singer and author, Margaret Bennett. Her writing style and choice of subject area is largely influenced by her master's degree in folklore.

== Published works ==
- More Than 50% : Woman's Life in a Newfoundland Outport, Breakwater Books, 1979
- Cows Don't Know it's Sunday : Agricultural Life in St. John's, ISER, 2002
- Of Boats on the Collar ... The Changing Face of a Newfoundland Fishing Community, Flanker Press, 2007

== See also ==
List of people of Newfoundland and Labrador
