= Carolyn Hayward =

Carolyn Frances Hayward (born 1934 in St. John's, Newfoundland) was a bullfighter and artist. Featured on Front Page Challenge, What's My Line and I've Got a Secret became a celebrity for both Canada and the United States for her success and career as a bullfighter.

Hayward was educated at Bishop Spencer College, St. John's; Institute Cultural Peruana Norteamericano and Nacional de Bellas Artes, Lima, Peru.

At Bishop Spencer College, where she was known as Carol Hayward, she was academically at the top of her class. She was also a gifted artist (especially in portrait artistry) while a student at Bishop Spencer College. During that time (1946–49), she lived at an Anglican Residence for Women on 55 Rennie's Mill Road named Bishop Jones Memorial Hostel. Their Register of Pupils, Bishop Spencer Lodge, Archives, Memorial University states her home as Gander and her parent as Mrs. Kathleen Hayward née Pippy, father Ellis Hayward. (Bishop Spencer Lodge became Bishop Jones Memorial Hostel in 1940.) Afterward, until her graduation in 1951, she lived with her grandmother Katherine Hayward at 46 Rennies Mill Road in a house almost directly across from the Hostel. After school, her friends would walk and leave her at her grandmother's house and then continue on to play sports. Carol didn't play on sports teams. Her grandmother once held a Halloween party in her house for Carol and her friends.

She became interested in bullfighting when she visited Spain and in 1957 fought her first non-professional fight at the Plaza de Toros in Toledo, Spain. Hayward's first bullfighting contract was arranged by Miguel Angel Garcia in 1960 at La Concepción, Guanajuato, Mexico.

In 1963 Hayward was the subject of a CBC documentary that featured one of her bullfights held near Mexico City. She retired from bullfighting in 1970 and began her study of art. Her work has been featured in ten collective and individual exhibitions.

== See also ==
- List of people of Newfoundland and Labrador
- List of communities in Newfoundland and Labrador
