= Frank Stamp =

Canadian boxer

Frank Stamp (1905 – May 27, 1954) was born in St. John's, Newfoundland and later became a police officer and a professional boxer.

Stamp had joined the Royal Newfoundland Constabulary in 1925. In 1930, he resigned from the constabulary to go to Boston in the US to pursue a professional boxing career.

On September 25, 2005, his name was engraved on the National Police and Peace Officers Memorial panel on Parliament Hill, Ottawa.

== See also ==
- List of people of Newfoundland and Labrador
