= Adele Fifield =

Canadian radiologist and amputee

Adele Fifield OOnt, CAE
- Born: 1966 (age 59–60); Trinity East, Newfoundland and Labrador
- Occupation: Association management
- Known for: Disability advocacy

Adele Fifield (born 1966) is a recipient of the Order of Ontario, and was a director of the War Amps' National Amputee Centre. In February 2008 she became CEO of the Canadian Association of Radiologists where she worked until 2016. She became executive director of the National Association of Pharmacy Regulatory Authorities in 2016-

== Personal life and education ==
Fifield was born in Trinity East, Newfoundland, Canada. After being diagnosed with cancer, and subsequently losing her leg, Fifield enrolled in The War Amps Child Amputee (CHAMP) Program. She soon became a Junior Counsellor and eventually was offered full employment with The War Amps in 1989.

She earned a Bachelor of Arts and Bachelor of Education from Memorial University in St. John's, Newfoundland., and is a Certified Association Executive (CAE) with the Canadian Society of Association Executives.

== Career ==
Fifield was awarded the Queen's Golden Jubilee Medal in 2002 and became a member of the Order of Ontario on September 20, 2004, for her dedicated advocacy for Canadian amputees and veterans in Ontario.

Fifield directed The War Amps National Amputee Centre until 2008, which she educated Canadian amputees, their families and the public on all aspects of amputation. She was also President of The War Amps Operation Legacy. Following that, she was the chief executive officer of the Canadian Association of Radiologists until 2016. While working as CEO of the Canadian Association of Radiologists, Fifield was awarded the Queen Elizabeth II Diamond Jubilee Medal and Executive Member of the Year of the Ottawa-Gatineau Canadian Society of Association Executives.

== Honours ==
- 2003 - Queen's Golden Jubilee Medal
- 2005 - Order of Ontario
- 2013 - Queen Elizabeth II Diamond Jubilee Medal
- 2013 - Executive Member of the Year of Ottawa-Gatineau CSAE

== See also ==
- List of people of Newfoundland and Labrador
