= Henry Collingwood =

Canadian businessman

Henry Collingwood, OC (May 6, 1918 – December 8, 2005) was a businessman and recipient of the Knight's Cross of Royal Order of St. Olav as granted to him by the King of Norway in 1975.

Born in St. John's, Newfoundland and educated at Prince of Wales Collegiate in St. John's, Collingwood began his working career at the family firm of Baine Johnston in 1934. In 1972 Collingwood was appointed president and CEO of the firm.

Collingwood served on many boards of major Newfoundland and Canadian corporations and held key positions with many community and charitable organizations. In 1958, he was named Norwegian consul for Newfoundland. For his service to Norway, in 1975 he was awarded the Knight's Cross of Royal Order of St. Olav by Olav V, King of Norway. In 1988 he received an honorary doctorate from Memorial University and he was made and officer of the Order of Canada in 1990.

He had four children: Tom, Chris, Lynn, and Robert.

Collingwood died on December 8, 2005, at St. John's.

== See also ==
- List of people of Newfoundland and Labrador
- List of communities in Newfoundland and Labrador
