= Ethel Dickenson =

Canadian nurse (1880–1918)

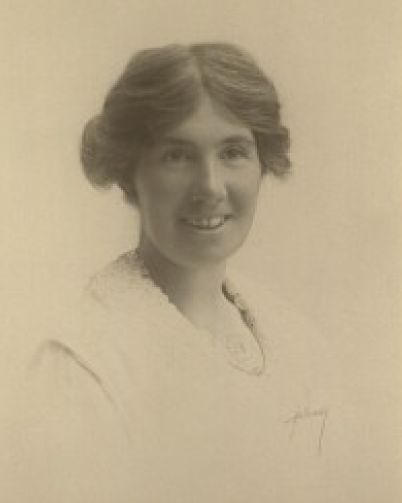
Ethel Dickenson

Ethel Gertrude Dickenson (July 6, 1880 – October 26, 1918) was an educator and nurse born in St. John's, Newfoundland. She is noted as being one of the Remarkable Women of Newfoundland and Labrador for her tireless work and death in the care of patients during the outbreak of Spanish influenza at St. John's in 1918.

== Biography ==
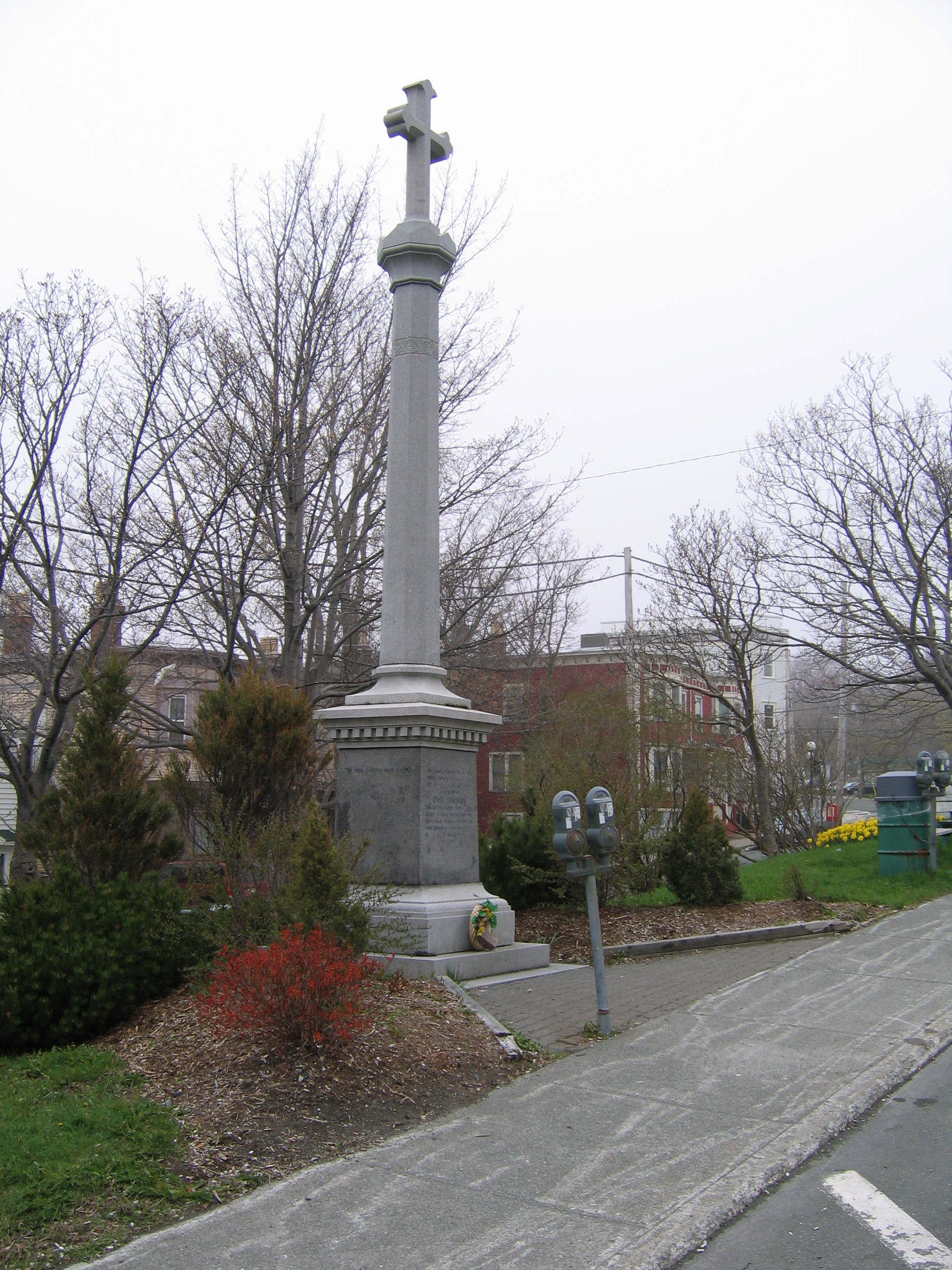
Stone monument to Dickenson, located near the former site of Fort William, St. John's, Newfoundland

Dickenson was educated at Methodist College, St. John's and MacDonald Institute, Guelph, Ontario, became a volunteer nurse during World War I at the Wandsworth Hospital, London and also the Ascot Hospital. She returned to St. John's for health reasons in 1918. The outbreak of Spanish influenza required that emergency services be set up at the King George the Fifth Institute where Dickenson had once again volunteered her nursing duties to care for the sick.

Dickenson was the only nurse who succumbed to the disease, she died October 26, 1918. A monument to Dickenson stands in Cavendish Square, an octagonal shaft with a Celtic cross at its pinnacle, sculpted from grey Aberdeen granite. The monument was unveiled by Lady and Governor Sir Charles Harris on October 26, 1920. Inscriptions on two opposite sides read as follows:

This shaft, surmounted by the world emblem of sacrifice, is set up by a grateful public in memory of Ethel Dickenson volunteer nurse who in the great epidemic of 1918 gave her life while tending patients at the King George the Fifth Institute, St. John's. In honour also of those who nursed with her in the imminent shadow of death.

On the other two sides: Be Thou Faithful Unto Death and I Will Give Thee A Crown of Life.

== See also ==
- List of people of Newfoundland and Labrador
- List of communities in Newfoundland and Labrador
