= Mary Widdicombe Travers =

Newfoundland entrepreneur; landlady to the House of Assembly

- Born: c. 1783; St. John's, Colony of Newfoundland
- Died: February 24, 1854 (aged 70–71); Kildare, Prince Edward Island

Mary Widdicombe Travers (c. 1783-1854) was a Newfoundland entrepreneur and philanthropist who was the landlady of the first Newfoundland House of Assembly.

== Life in Newfoundland ==
Mary was born circa 1783, daughter of John, a planter and owner of the Rose and Crown tavern, and Mary Kennedy Widdicombe (or Widdicomb), of St. John's, Newfoundland. Circa 1804, Mary married John Travers (1779-?) also of St. John's. According to family lore, John Travers was a merchant who traded molasses and salt cod fish, and who disappeared at sea sometime prior to 1832.

By 1831, Mary was the owner of a hotel and tavern located at King’s Place, near present-day Duckworth Street, opposite the site of the National War Memorial. In December of 1831, a John Crute was advertising a sleigh and horse for rent from the stables behind "Mrs. Travers's Hotel". Described as a "modest, two-storey frame building," it was a favourite gathering place for the intelligentsia of the time and hosted a number of clubs and societies, including the Sons of Erin, and the Dialectic Society. The Sons of Erin held their St. Patrick's Day dinner at the hotel in 1832, one local paper reporting the "entertainment was sumptuous and abundant, and served up in a style exceedingly creditable to the hostess" and was followed by "a plentiful discussion of good things, to which the melting strains of an Irish piper gave additional rest."

In November of 1832, the tavern was selected as the only polling station for St. John’s for the election of members to the first House of Assembly. Meetings where candidates addressed and tried to win over potential voters were held outside the hotel on 6 November 1832.

It was at this site, on hustings erected in front of the hotel, that the candidates gathered on Nov. 6 and made their election speeches to the attendant crowd... The candidates then took their supporters inside in groups of 10, where each man cast his ballot by announcing to all assembled the name of the person he was voting for.

Following the election, it was announced that it would be the site where the legislature would meet, as the courthouse was too small, and after its initial meeting on 2 January 1833, the House of Assembly met almost daily in the tavern for the next five months. However, the Members neglected to pass an appropriation for rent, and Travers had hired extra servants and used more coal and wood than she normally would. Having been not paid her rent,

...an irate Mrs. Travers treated them like any other indigent roomers and ejected them from her premises. She also seized the Speaker's chair and hat, the mace of the Sergeant-at-Arms, and desks, books and papers belonging to the House of Assembly.

The mace was the colony's original wooden mace, which was hand-painted in gold and crimson, and which had been given by the British authorities to the newly elected House of Assembly in 1833. Travers advertised the Speaker’s chair for sale in a local newspaper as being “elegantly upholstered and finished in black moreen and ornamented with brass.” On April 3, 1833,

Mrs. Travers was ordered to appear at the Bar of the House where she was threatened with grave and dire penalties if she did not release the furniture. But she was evidently a woman of firm and determined character. She persisted in her refusal and the House was thereupon compelled to have recourse to a resolution asking the Governor to get the furniture.

At the session of the House in January 1834, Clerk Edward Mortimer Archibald reported that "certain papers and furniture" belonging to the house were in possession of and detained by Mrs. Mary Travers. He was instructed to call on the landlady and demand the articles. This he did, and returned to report that she refused to deliver them.

In June of that year, Mary advertised the items for sale again. In addition to the Speaker's Chair she listed a number of items including the following:

1 LARGE DESK - Containing 8 Drawers filled with a variety of Books and Papers of every description. 1 SMALL Ditto, used exclusively by the Speaker; and filled also with Books, Papers, and a Portfolio of great value.... 1 LARGE CHAIR stuffed, superbly covered, and well and substantially built, used by the Usher of the Black Rod. A COCKED HAT of superior quality, but now a little shabby, worn by the Sergeant-at-Arms.

Governor Thomas John Cochrane ordered payments to be made to Mary Travers totalling 85 pounds, 13 shillings, four pence (equivalent to £9,627 in 2025) for the use of furniture, coal, wood, candles, services and hire of servants; and 108 pounds, six shillings, eight pence (equivalent to £12,174 in 2025) for rental of her premises. These amounts were rejected by the Treasury, but in November, Cochrane ordered that these accounts be paid from the Military Chest. There is no indication that they were, as Mary Travers again petitioned the House of Assembly for payment in February 1835. The furniture and papers were recovered, eventually, by the government.

Travers continued to operate the hotel up to 1846 at which point it was destroyed in the St. John's 1846 Great Fire, in which 2,000 buildings were destroyed.

== Life in Prince Edward Island ==
At some point after 1846, Travers and her seven sons and daughters moved to the Kildare Capes, Prince Edward Island, where they acquired a 3000-acre property. On 3 October 1851, the area was struck by the Yankee Gale, the worst marine disaster in the history of the island.

On the morning of Oct 5, 1851, Mary’s son, John, beachcombed the beaches and found 9 dead sailors. He found some sail cloth amongst the debris and he wrapped the bodies and dragged them up the cliffs and buried them in the family cemetery in an unmarked mass grave. Mary insisted that a church be built alongside the cemetery.

Before the end of October of 1851 twelve more bodies were found and buried in this cemetery. The first church on the site was constructed by 1866, and was the first Anglican church in Prince County. Mary Travers and Jane Travers gave the cemetery property, an area of about two acres, to the church.

Travers continued to petition for rent owed her by the Newfoundland House of Assembly. On 7 May 1851, a Mr. Parsons presented to the House a petition from Mary Travers, stating she received payment for the first session according to agreement, "and that for six months thereafter, she had in her charge the various papers and documents belonging thereto, for which she had not been paid" and that "she had been prevented using the house as a boarding house during the time she held it at the disposal of the Assembly."

The petition was referred to the Committee on Contingencies.

== Death and burial ==
Mary Travers died 24 February 1854 in Kildare, Prince Edward Island. The local newspaper reported,

[Died] At her residence, Kildare, Lot 3, after a long and painful illness, on Friday morning, 24th February last, regretted by a large circle of relatives and friends, Mrs. Mary Travers, formerly of St. John’s Newfoundland.

Her mother died later the same year, on 15 September 1854,

Died. At St. John’s Newfoundland, on the 22d of August, after a painful illness which she bore with Christian fortitude, Mrs. Mary Widdecombe, aged 99 years; 86 year of which she spent in that town. (Deceased was mother of the late Mrs. Mary Travers, of Kildare.)

Records indicate Travers' last attempt to obtain the full payment of what was owed to her arrived at the Newfoundland House of Assembly as a petition following her death, which was read in the House on 18 April 1854, noting in part,

The great straits to which she has been reduced by the Government of Newfoundland not entertaining her claim for arrears of rent due since 1833, when her house, in St. John's, was occupied as the Legislative Assembly; and praying that compensation may be made her.

There is no record of her family receiving final payment for her services.

== External links section ==
Grave of Mary Widdicombe Travers - https://www.findagrave.com/memorial/160621936/mary-travers
