= Jonathan Ogden (surgeon) =

Canadian surgeon (died 1803)

Jonathan Ogden (died 1803) was a Canadian surgeon and chief justice of Newfoundland.

Born in Nova Scotia, Ogden was sent to St. John's in 1784 as assistant surgeon for the Royal Navy. In 1794, he was appointed magistrate for St. John's and then in 1798 as magistrate of all of Newfoundland and deputy naval officer under Richard Hatt Noble. In 1802, Ogden was appointed Chief Justice of the Supreme Court, a position he had resigned the following year.

== See also ==
- List of people of Newfoundland and Labrador
