= Eleanor Power =

British murderer executed in modern day Canada (died 1754)

- Died: 11 October 1754; St. John's, Newfoundland Colony
- Citizenship: British

Eleanor Power (died 11 October 1754) was the first non-native woman to be executed in what is today Canada. Power was hanged for the murder of William Keen, a justice of the peace in St. John's, Newfoundland.

== The crime ==
Power, her husband Robert Power, and seven other men were convicted of murdering Keen in a burglary attempt of Keen's summer home on 9 September 1754. There had been ten accomplices who initially broke into Keen's house and stole a chest and some silver spoons. When the chest was found to contain only alcohol, Eleanor Power and one of the male accomplices left the scene. The eight who remained behind decided to make another burglary attempt. When Keen awoke in his bed during the second attempt, he was beaten by two of the accomplices with a scythe and the butt of a musket. Keen died of his injuries on 29 September 1754.

== Trial and execution ==
On 8 October 1754, nine of the accomplices, including Eleanor Power, were brought to trial for murder before the Court of Oyer and Terminer of Newfoundland. The tenth accomplice, Nicholas Tobin, was the only Crown witness against the nine defendants. Undefended by lawyers, the nine defendants were convicted of murder by a jury after 30 minutes of deliberation and sentenced to death by hanging. Two of the male accomplices were executed on 10 October 1754; the following day, Eleanor and Robert Power followed and became the first married couple to hang together in present-day Canada. Eleanor Power was also the first English woman to be executed by British authorities in present-day Canada.

After years of imprisonment in St. John's, the five remaining defendants were eventually pardoned on condition that they leave Newfoundland and never return.

== Modern analysis ==
Modern commentators have suggested that Eleanor Power might have escaped execution had she been represented by a qualified lawyer at her trial. This is because while Power could have legitimately been convicted of burglary, she was likely not guilty of murder since she had abandoned the conspirators after the first break-in and played no role in Keen's death. The same commentators have also suggested that the court that convicted the nine defendants was illegally constituted because the English law that governed the Colony of Newfoundland mandated that capital trials for offences committed in Newfoundland had to be tried by courts in England. However, they may have been convicted under the English common law doctrine of felony murder.
