= Vera Perlin =

Canadian activist (1902–1974)

Elizabeth Vera Perlin, OC (1902 – 1974) was a Canadian advocate for the rights of the mentally disabled and a reformer who influenced the entire school system of Newfoundland and broke new ground on a national scale with her vision and accomplishments. Perlin was the founder of the Newfoundland Association for the Help of Retarded Children, founded two years before the nationally orientated Canadian Association for Community Living.

== Early life and education ==
Perlin was born in St. John's, Newfoundland (now Newfoundland and Labrador, Canada), the daughter of Mitchie Ann (Manuel) and John Chalker Crosbie, married Albert B. Perlin. Her husband and family were part of the small but influential Jewish community in St John's. She was educated at Holloway School in St. John's and private schools in Toronto, Ontario.

== Work ==
While volunteering at the United Church Orphanage in St. John's, Perlin encountered many foster children with developmental disabilities who were receiving no education as a result of special needs. As a member of the advisory board of the United Church Orphanage, she persuaded church officials to fund an experimental day school modeled after schools she had studied in Great Britain. Perlin recruited Molly Dingle as teacher and opened the school in the orphanage on Hamilton Avenue in 1954. In 1956, Perlin founded the Newfoundland Association for the Help of Retarded Children, which is now known as the Newfoundland and Labrador for Community Living. With the aid of donations and volunteer work the association opened the Vera Perlin School in 1959 on Patrick Street. In 1966, a multipurpose building was constructed to help support the growing program, initially named The Vera Perlin School, it has since been renamed The Perlin Centre. The program expanded and eleven branches were established outside of St. John's to further support those with developmental disabilities. The Vera Perlin Society, a community living organization is named after her.

== Awards ==
- 1955, President of the Regional Council of Home and School Associations.
- 1962, first Citizen of the Year Award given by St. John's
- 1967, one of 11 Canadian women honoured as Women of the Century by the National Council of Jewish Women.
- 1968, appointed Officer of the Order of Canada for her "services to the community in many organizations, particularly those dealing with the care and treatment of retarded children".
- 1970, awarded an honorary LL.D. by Memorial University of Newfoundland.

== See also ==
- List of people of Newfoundland and Labrador
- List of communities in Newfoundland and Labrador
