= Lewis H.M. Ayre =

Canadian businessman (1914–1985)

Lewis Haldane Miller Ayre, CM (April 22, 1914 – December 8, 1985) was a Canadian businessman.

Born in St. John's, Newfoundland, he started working at his family's company of Ayre and Sons Ltd. in 1931. Ayre would transform it to a holding company which owned Job Brothers & Co., Limited, J. Michaels Fashions Ltd., Northatlantic Fisheries, Blue Buoy Foods Ltd., and Holly's Ltd.

He was a member of the Board of Directors of the Bank of Nova Scotia, Newfoundland Telephone Co. Ltd. and Dominion Stores Ltd. In addition, he was a member of the board of regents of Memorial University.

In 1981, he was made a Member of the Order of Canada for his contributions to the business life of Newfoundland and to educational and charitable projects in his province and native city of St. John's.

Ayre was also a curler, and represented Newfoundland at the 1953 Macdonald Brier.

== See also ==
- List of people of Newfoundland and Labrador
