= Rae Perlin =

Canadian painter

- Born: September 11, 1910; St. John's, Newfoundland
- Died: March 5, 2006 (aged 95); St. John's, Newfoundland and Labrador, Canada
- Known for: Painter; nurse

Rae Perlin (September 11, 1910 – March 5, 2006) was a nurse and artist from St. John's, Newfoundland, best known for her sketches and her work as an impressionist style painter.

== Biography ==
Perlin, was born on September 11, 1910, the youngest of six children of Adelle (Adams) and Israel Perlin. She was educated at Bishop Spencer College in St. John's and a private school in Ontario. She left for New York at an early age to study nursing. She graduated from nursing school in 1934 and worked as a nurse during the Great Depression and the World War II. Her passion was not nursing but art, eventually studying with Samuel Brecher and Hans Hofmann.

Perlin moved to Paris in 1950 to study at Académie de la Grande Chaumière and Académie Ranson to further her art studies. From there she moved to London to study at the Polytechnic of Central London. In 1959 she moved back to St. John's to care for her ailing mother. While back at her birthplace she worked at the St. John's General Hospital, still not liking that profession.

Perlin's work is displayed in art galleries and in 1994 she was the subject of a biography, Not A Still Life, by Mariam Francis White. Perlin joined the Baháʼí Faith in 1969, the fourth native Newfoundlander to do so.

Perlin died on March 5, 2006, at St. John's after a long struggle with Alzheimer's disease.

== See also ==
- List of people of Newfoundland and Labrador
