= Molly Dingle =

Canadian educator

- Born: 1892; St. John's, Newfoundland
- Died: 1987 (aged 94–95); St. John's, Newfoundland
- Education: Holloway School, St. John's; Nova Scotia Teachers College, Truro

Molly Dingle MBE (1892–1987) was a Canadian educator, born in St. John's, Newfoundland. Dingle at the age of 16 began as a teacher's aid at Holloway School and joined the staff in 1915. When she retired in 1952, she was its principal.

== Career ==
She received her education at the Presbyterian Hall and the Holloway School in St. John's, from which she graduated in 1908. In 1908 she got a position as a teacher-assistant at the school and in 1914 attended the Nova Scotia Teachers College, to qualify as a kindergarten teacher. In 1915 she returned to Newfoundland and, with the exception the 1933–34 school year, when she went as an exchange teacher to Dunfermline, Scotland, she spent the remainder of her teaching career in St. John's, until 1952. She was involved in training teachers at the annual summer schools and because of that was well known among Newfoundland teachers.

In 1952, she went to England on an exchange and on her return in 1953, she was approached by Vera Perlin who wanted her to become part of a new programme she was developing to help educate mentally disabled children. She joined the staff of the first school opened in 1954 and operated from the United Church of Canada orphanage in St. John's. Over the next two years she visited other schools in Truro, Montreal and England to become acquainted with their methods and programmes. Dingle went on to teach at the Vera Perlin School until age 77.

== Awards ==
In 1949 she received an MBE for her dedication, certificates of merit from both schools and an honorary life membership of the Newfoundland Teachers' Association. Molly also was honoured by the Newfoundland Association for the Help of Retarded Children for her contribution to the work of the organization.

== See also ==
- List of people of Newfoundland and Labrador
- List of communities in Newfoundland and Labrador
