= Kildare, Prince Edward Island =

Coordinates: 46.860°N 64.117°W

Location of Kildare in Prince Edward Island

Kildare (Irish: Cill Dara, meaning 'church of the oak') is a settlement in Prince Edward Island. It was named after Kildare in Ireland.
