= Otto Tucker =

Canadian heritage activist, storyteller, and educator

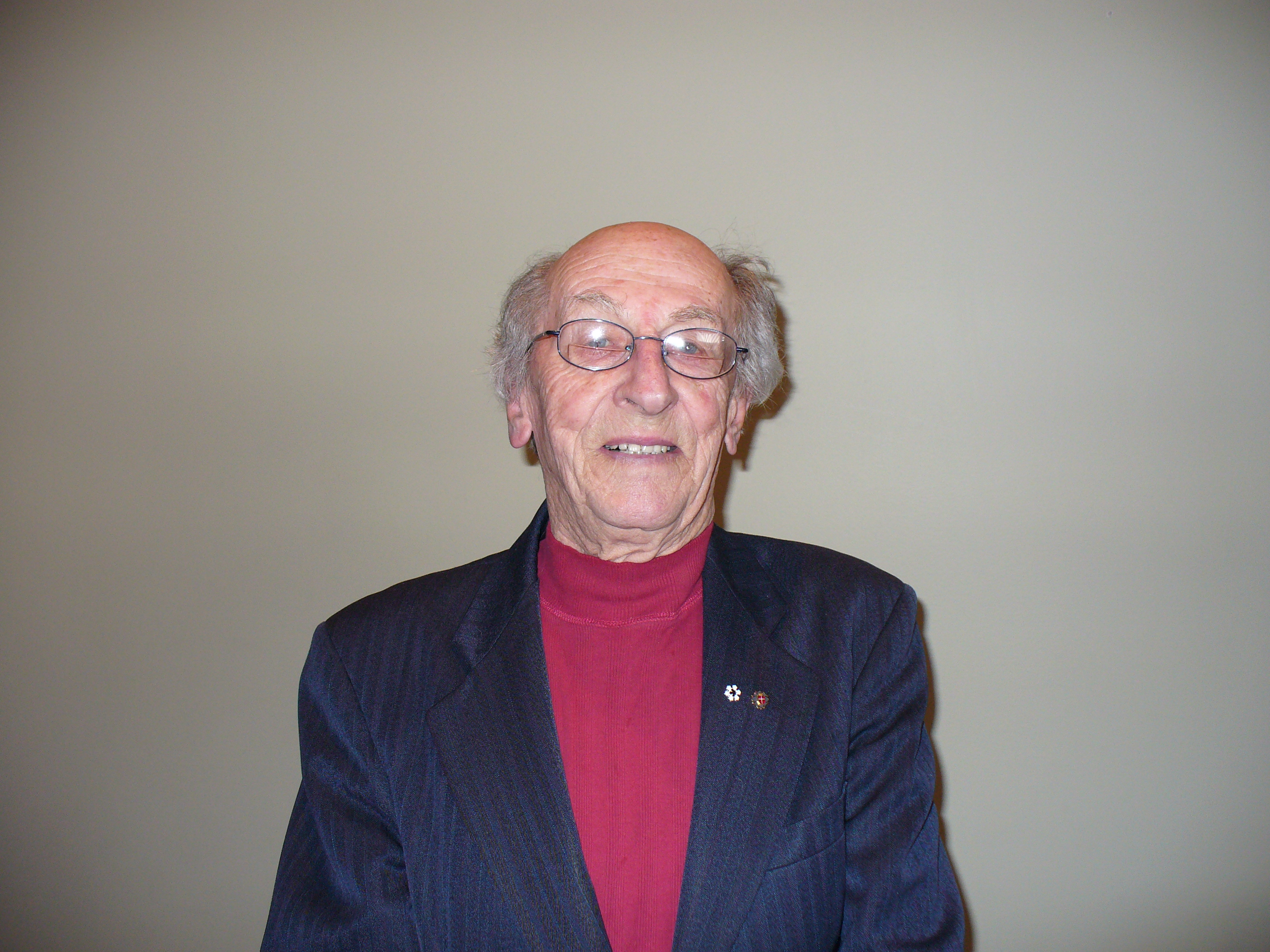
- Tucker in 2008
- Born: Otto George Tucker; October 4, 1923; Winterton, Newfoundland
- Died: October 6, 2015 (aged 92); St. John's, Newfoundland and Labrador, Canada
- Spouse: Ruby Perry (m. 1955)
- Children: 2

Academic background
- Education: Memorial University of Newfoundland (BA); University of Alberta (M.Ed.); University of Toronto (D.Ed.)

Otto George Tucker, CM ONL (October 4, 1923 – October 6, 2015) was a Newfoundlander and Canadian heritage activist, storyteller, and educator. He was a recipient of the Order of Canada for his work in promoting and preserving Newfoundland and Labrador heritage and the Order of Newfoundland and Labrador for his efforts that have made significant contributions to both the educational and cultural sectors of the province.

== Early life ==
Tucker was born in Winterton, Trinity Bay, Newfoundland and Labrador, Canada to John and Clara (née Pitcher) Tucker. His father fished during the summer, and migrated to the New England states during the winter to work as a carpenter. He had one sister, Florence. His mother was a Salvation Army officer who resigned from officership before her children were born, but encouraged them to pursue the faith. Tucker played cornet in the Salvation Army Corp's brass band beginning at a very early age.

== Family life ==
Tucker married Ruby Perry of Botwood, Newfoundland and Labrador on Tuesday, July 12, 1955, at the Salvation Army Citadel in St. John's, Newfoundland and Labrador. They have two sons, William (Bill) and Craig.

== Education ==
In 1942, after finishing grade 11, Tucker attended six weeks at the Summer School Teacher Training Program at Memorial College. Upon completion of this training program, he was awarded a Third Grade Teaching Certificate by the Newfoundland Department of Education.

He graduated from Memorial University of Newfoundland with a Bachelor of Arts in Education in 1955. He received a master's degree in Education from the University of Alberta in 1963 and a doctorate in Education from the University of Toronto in 1967. During his time at the University of Toronto, he organized the first Graduate Students Association in Education and was elected as president of the association.

== Career ==
After finishing the Summer School Teacher Training Program at Memorial College in 1942, Tucker was appointed a position in LaScie by the Salvation Army Superintendent at the Department of Education. He was 19 years old.

During the 1948-1949 school year, he was the principal of the Salvation Army school in Botwood; from 1949-1951, he was principal of the Salvation Army School in Gambo.

During his time in Gambo, Tucker helped found the Gambo-Gander branch of the Newfoundland and Labrador Teacher's Association, and later co-founded a branch at Memorial University.

While completing his thesis for his M.Ed at the University of Alberta, he taught history at Booth Memorial in St. John's, where he also served as Department Head of Social Studies. Following his time at Booth, Tucker served as the school principal and area administrator for the Mackenzie District of Northern Canada, from 1961 to 1964. He held positions in both Aklavik and Fort MacPherson, Northwest Territories.

He was a professor of Education at Acadia University in Wolfville, Nova Scotia, from until 1971 when he was appointed to Memorial University of Newfoundland Faculty of Education until his retirement.

== Other Achievements ==
In 1986, Tucker portrayed Grandpa Walcott in a CBC adaptation of the Ted Russell's Tales from Pigeon Inlet called Yarns from Pigeon Inlet.

Tucker had a passionate interest in Newfoundland and Labrador's connection to the Wessex area of England. In 1984, he co-founded the Wessex Society of Newfoundland, serving as its president for 22 years. The association is dedicated to promoting Newfoundland and Labrador's ties to the West Country of England. His enthusiasm for this subject led to the creation of a sister Wessex Society in Dorset, England.

== Awards ==
In 1994, Tucker was awarded the Newfoundland Historical Society Heritage Award for having contributed significantly to the history of Newfoundland and Labrador. In 1997, Tucker received an Honorary Doctor of Laws Degree (L.L.D.) from Memorial University. In 1999, he was made an Honorary Member of the Newfoundland and Labrador Teacher's Association. Tucker also received the Canada 125 medal, the Silver Cross of St. George, and the Queen's Jubilee Medal for his work with the Newfoundland and Labrador Prostate Cancer Society.

In 2004, Tucker was one of the first nine inductees to The Order of Newfoundland and Labrador. The Order of Newfoundland and Labrador recognizes individuals who demonstrate excellence and achievement in fields which benefit in an outstanding manner the residents of Newfoundland and Labrador. On April 6, 2006, Tucker was appointed to The Order of Canada by Governor General Michaëlle Jean for his work promoting the heritage and culture of Newfoundland and Labrador, and safeguarding its traditions and oral histories.

== Death ==
Tucker died on October 6, 2015, at the age of 92 after a long illness.

== Bibliography ==
Tucker was prolific author and regular contributor to the Newfoundland Quarterly. Some of his writings include:

=== Books ===
- Tucker, Otto., and Sylvia Quinton Ficken. From the Heart of a Bayman. St. John's: Harry Cuff Publications, 1984.
- Tucker, Otto., Ted Russell, Cyril F. Poole, Jessie Mifflen, George H. Earle, G. M. Story, and Sylvia Quinton Ficken. A Yaffle of Yarns: Five Newfoundland Writers. St. John's: Harry Cuff Publications, 1985.
- Tucker, Otto. A Collection of Stories. Seventh Wave Newfoundland Writers Series. St. John's: Harry Cuff, 1987.
- Tucker, Otto. That Nothing Be Lost. St. John's: Harry Cuff Publications, 2003.
- Tucker, Otto. Humour on life's journey. St. John's: Railway Coastal Museum, c2003.

=== Articles ===
- A Library for Change Islands: A Prayerful Creativity. The Newfoundland Quarterly, 90.1 (Winter 1995-96).
- Bridging the Gap Between Scilly Cove and Poole: A Newfoundlander's Quest for his English Roots. NL Ancestor, 2.3 (1986).
- Coffin Trimmings. The Newfoundland Quarterly, 91.2 (Fall 1997).
- Events Surrounding the Christmas Line. The Newfoundland Quarterly, 87.4 (Winter 1992-93).
- Fire a Volley! Salvation Army Beginnings in Newfoundland. The Newfoundland Quarterly, 85.3 (Winter 1990).
- Forth to LaScie With the Torch of Truth. The Newfoundland Quarterly, 75.1 (Spring 1979).
- Gambling: One Things Leads to Another. The Newfoundland Quarterly, 85.4 (Spring-Summer 1990).
- Grandfather and the Journalist. The War Cry (1954).
- On Tearing Down the Southside. The Newfoundland Quarterly, 82.1 (Summer 1986).
- Random Thoughts on the Rearin' of Stearins. The Newfoundland Quarterly, 89.3 (Summer 1995).
- Reflections of a Newfoundland Roof-Warden. The Newfoundland Quarterly, 81.3 (Winter 1986).
- The Big R. F. And the Small R. F. The Newfoundland Quarterly, 93.2 (Winter 2000).
- The Wessex Society of Newfoundland: A Record of Historic Moments. The Newfoundland Quarterly, 81.2 (Fall 1985).
- To Argentia in the Spirit. The Newfoundland Quarterly, 94.3 (Summer 2001).
- Winterton. NL Ancestor, 12.4 (1996).

== See also ==
- List of people of Newfoundland and Labrador
- List of communities in Newfoundland and Labrador
