= Ralph LeMoine Andrews =

Canadian education improver

Ralph LeMoine Andrews, CM recipient of the Order of Canada for his work in the improvement of education and welfare in Newfoundland and for notable contributions to the development of his province and to his own community of St. John's.

== See also ==
- List of people of Newfoundland and Labrador
