= William Keen (merchant) =

English-Newfoundland merchant

William Keen (c. 1680s – 29 September 1754) was a sheep merchant in St. John's who became the first resident judicial officer in the British colony of Newfoundland.

== Biography ==
Keen was an English resident of Boston, Province of Massachusetts Bay; little is known about his life in Boston. In 1704, he moved to St. John's, Newfoundland to act as an agent for New England merchants operating in the area. He eventually became a trader himself and he became a wealthy and significant property owner in St John's, Harbour Grace, and Greenspond.

From 1699 to 1729, Newfoundland courts consisted solely of "fishing Admirals" who travelled to the island from England during the summers with the fishing fleets. Persons who committed capital offences were required to travel to England for trial, and no judicial officers were present in Newfoundland during the winters. By 1720, this situation had led to a high crime rate in St. John's and the British government appointed Keen as the first "winter" justice of the peace who would conduct judicial business while the fishing Admirals were away.

In practice, Governor Henry Osborn allowed Keen and the other justices of the peace who were appointed to hear cases year round. There were many disputes between the justices of the peace and the fishing Admirals, and Keen became the leader of a movement to officially establish a permanent judiciary in Newfoundland. He was a close advisor to many of the governors of Newfoundland, most of whose tenure lasted only a few years. In 1750, the British government decided that justices of the peace in St John's could sit in judgment as "commissioners" over all cases except treason, although they could only do so if the governor was present in Newfoundland. Keen was the first such commissioner to be appointed.

On 9 September 1754, Keen was attacked in his bed at his summer home when he awoke during a burglary. He was beaten with a scythe and the butt of a musket and died of his injuries in St. John nearly three weeks later. Eight men and one woman, Eleanor Power, were convicted of his murder before the court that Keen had presided over; four, including Power, were executed for the crime.

Keen's son, William, inherited his property and his position as commissioner. William Keen Jr. moved to England in 1760, but the Keen family retained property in St. John's and Harbour Grace until 1839.
