= John Bartlett Angel =

Canadian educationalist (1913–1993)

John Bartlett Angel CM (June 12, 1913 – January 10, 1993), born in St. John's, Newfoundland, was a recipient of the Order of Canada for his work in the improvement of education and welfare in Newfoundland through his voluntary service to the province.

Angel is the fourth-generation president of the United Nail and Foundry Company Limited. Angel's mother was Mary Elizabeth Bartlett, sister of Captain Robert Bartlett.

Angel was a member of the following northern expeditions on the Effie M. Morrissey:

- 1931 – Norcross-Bartlett expedition to North East Greenland,
- 1932 – Peary Memorial expedition to North West Greenland,
- 1933 – Norcross-Bartlett expedition to Foxe Basin,
- 1935 – Bartlett expedition to North West Greenland,

These are some of the other accomplishments and awards that Angel has received:

- Canadian Centennial Medal,
- honorary life membership, Canadian Cancer Society,
- life membership, Association of Professional Engineers of Newfoundland,
- honorary Doctor of Engineering Degree, Memorial University of Newfoundland,
- member, Order of Canada,
- gold medal award, Canadian Council of Professional Engineers.

== See also ==
- List of people of Newfoundland and Labrador
