= Isabella Whiteford Rogerson =

Newfoundland Poet

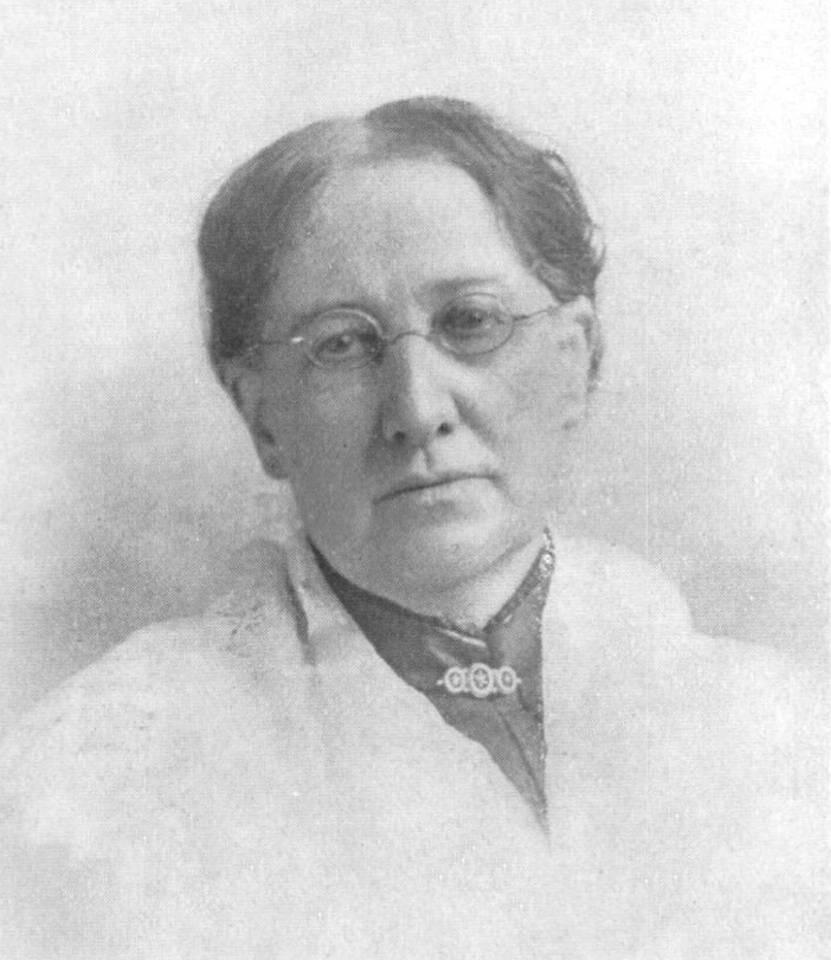
- Born: Isabella Whiteford; 3 January 1835; Fair Head, County Antrim, Ireland
- Died: 2 February 1905 (aged 70); St. John's, Newfoundland
- Occupation: Writer
- Writing career
- Pen name: Caed Mille Failtha; Isabella

Isabella Whiteford Rogerson (3 January 1835 – 2 February 1905) was a Newfoundland poet and philanthropist who also wrote under the noms de plume Caed Mille Failtha and Isabella.

== Early life ==
Born in County Antrim in 1835 to Alexander Whiteford, a watchmaker, and his wife Isabella Mathers, she emigrated to Newfoundland with her parents in 1850. Her father built a cottage in St. John's, named Dunluce, where Rogerson spent some time and which may have inspired some of her writing.

== Poetry ==
Isabella was already a writer of verse on her arrival in the colony at the age of 15. Though living in Newfoundland, she published her first volume of poetry in Ireland.

Isabella Whiteford published her first volume, Poems (1860), in Belfast. It contains some 120 poems, mostly written in the colony and divided equally between Irish and Newfoundland scenes and subjects.

The subjects of her poems included local events, friends, and nature.

One of six children, four of whom died before her, Isabella also wrote affectionate verses about her youngest sister and other family members. In his introduction to her second volume of poetry, D.W. Prowse noted the spiritual thread running through her work.

Her second volume, The Victorian triumph and other poems, was published in Toronto, Canada, in 1898. A contemporary reviewer noted:

This dainty volume contains many gems of pure poetic lustre. The marked characteristics of Mrs. Rogerson's poems are deep religious feeling, patriotic sentiment, and musical expression.

After this, she continued to write occasional poetry for local publications. She was remembered in 1938 by writer Robert Gear MacDonald in this way:

Mrs. Rogerson was not native born, she came here from Antrim County in the north of Ireland. But she quickly and permanently identified herself with this country, and is, in some ways, the typical Newfoundland poetess. Her two volumes provide (with material of less value, though none of it negligible from our point of view) some genuine things. Her later works especially, with the poems "Cabot," "Mid-Summer Eve," "Topsail," this last full of lovely sights and sounds), are all beautiful, and racy of the sea and soil.

Her obituary noted,

She was also well known to the general public of Newfoundland as "Isabella," the poetess. All her poems were of a high standard of literary excellence and breathed a broad spirit of Christianity and patriotism which will perpetuate her memory among the generations to come in Newfoundland.

Later critiques of her work have not been so kind, with her diction described as "a vehicle all too often for the insipid murmurings of the minor Victorian poet." Her work has also been criticized as being colonialist in approach:

Rogerson’s poetry collection is a reflection of the sentiments of the time, but in its creation, publication and distribution, it also helped perpetuate and normalise what she sees as appropriate behaviour for a colony of the British Empire. Rogerson, through her praise and optimism about Newfoundland, used her poetry as a mobilising effort to garner Newfoundland nationalism and thereby promote patriotism towards the British Empire. It helped contribute to the growing number of myths that motivated Imperialism and adopted common Imperial myths of discovery, racial superiority, and British notions of progress for Newfoundland.

== Married life and philanthropy ==
She became Isabella Whiteford Rogerson when she married James Johnstone Rogerson, a local leading politician, in 1879. She was his second wife. Rogerson had no children of her own but raised his and considered them her family. Her husband was known for his temperance and philanthropic work and Rogerson joined him. They were particularly focused on educational and housing provisions for the area's poor, unemployed, and imprisoned citizens. Rogerson also worked with the Church Woman's Missionary Society and led Methodist classes. She worked to establish a fisherman and sailors home and an employment agency for out-of-season workers with her husband. She was described as "a centre of inspiration in church work, temperance effort, and Christian philanthropy."

== Death and legacy ==
Rogerson died 2 February 1905 at her residence on Queen Street, St John’s, after a protracted illness: Her cause of death was listed as cardiac failure.

A telegram from St John's yesterday to Mrs. Munn conveyed the news of the death of Mrs. Isabella Rogerson, wife of the Hon. J. J. Rogerson. The deceased lady was one of the foremost of the ladies of this country in good and charitable works, and her gifted pen has added not a little to her fame The deceased lady was well advanced in years.

She was buried in the Rogerson family vault at the General Protestant Cemetery in St. John's. Her name is also inscribed on a second gravestone, located off Duckworth Street, possibly a practice stone left behind by a nearby monument business.

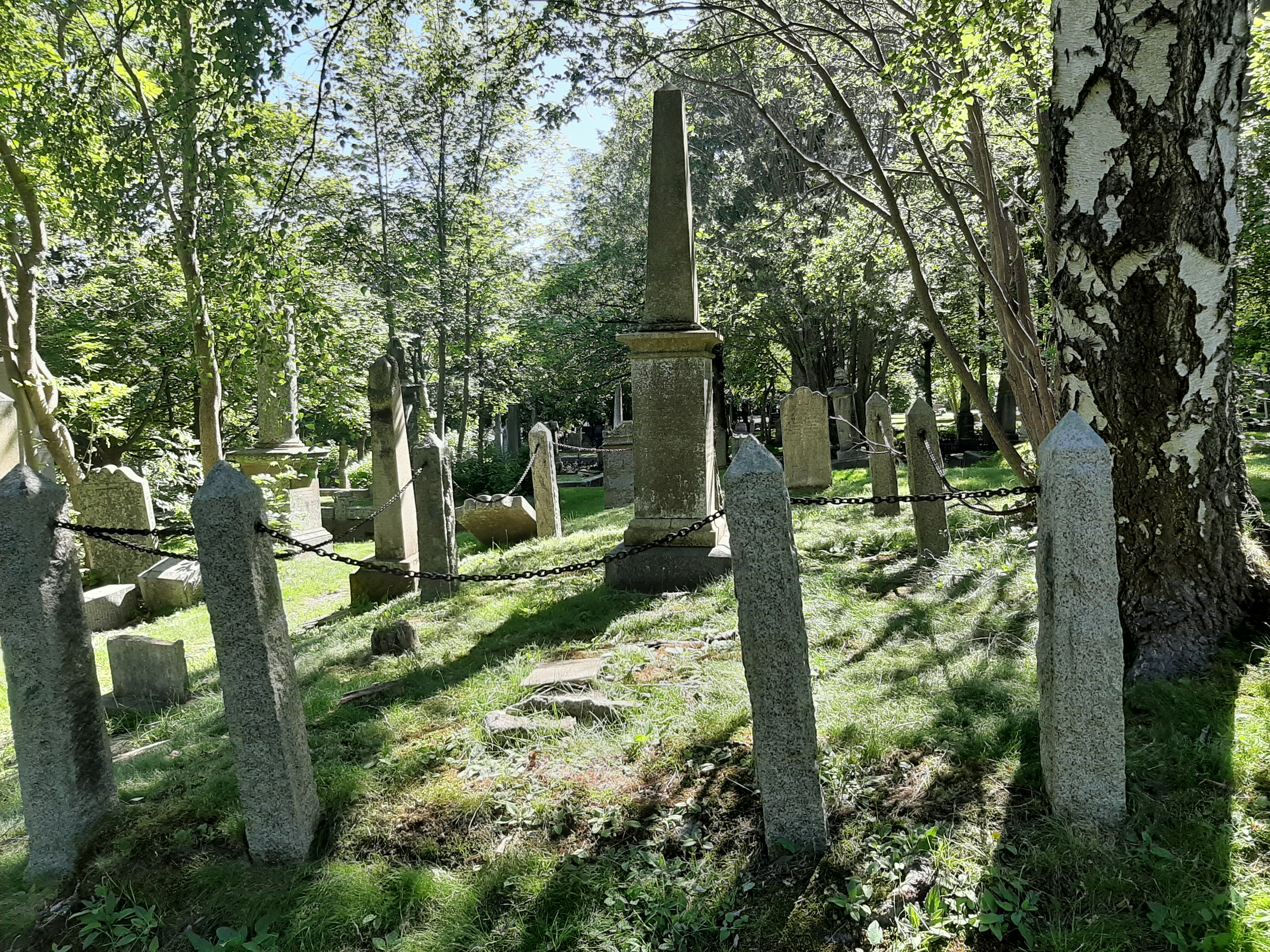
The Rogerson Vault at the General Protestant Cemetery in St. John's, Newfoundland and Labrador.

In 2019, Rogerson was included in the children's book "Agnes Ayre’s ABCs of Amazing Women: Newfoundland & Labrador Women of Note (Some of Whom Won Us the Vote)."

== Selected bibliography ==
- Poems (1860)
- The Victorian Triumph: And Other Poems (1898). Kessinger Publishing. May 2009. ISBN 978-1-104-55603-7.
- "Father Scott." Newfoundland Quarterly, 2.1 (1902): 8.
- "An episode of the St. John's Fire, July 8th, 1892 (Founded on Fact)." Daily News (1961-04-03): 5.
