= Al Clouston =

Canadian storyteller

- Born: 1910; Newfoundland
- Died: October 27, 2004 (aged 93–94); St. John's, Newfoundland and Labrador, Canada
- Other name: Uncle Al
- Citizenship: Newfoundlander until 31 March 1949; Canadian from 31 March 1949
- Occupations: Humorist, storyteller

Alwyn Vey Clouston (1910 – October 27, 2004 in St. John's, Newfoundland and Labrador, Canada) was a Canadian storyteller and humorist known as "Uncle Al."

He was popular at conventions during the time he worked as a travelling businessman and owner of John Clouston Ltd. of St. John's, Newfoundland. He retired in 1975 and became a best-selling author of comedy books. In 1980, his comedy album Cinderelly was nominated for a Canadian Juno Award. His other albums included Spinnin' Yarns and Come 'er till I tell You.

Clouston married Ida Bridden at St. John's Topsail Anglican Church on November 25, 1933, and they remained together until her death. Clouston died aged 94, and was survived by their two children (Carol Ann and Ian Bridden; died 2008), four grandchildren (Nancy, Doug, John, and Elizabeth), and five great-grandchildren.

Alwyn was the son of John Clouston, grandson of Thomas Clouston (both of St. John's), and the great-grandson of John Clouston, a stonemason from Kirkwall, Orkney (early 19th century).

He was almost certainly related (at least distantly) to Brian Clouston, Sir Edward Clouston, 1st Baronet, Storer Clouston and William Alexander Clouston, as the surname Clouston is (according to Storer Clouston in his book Family of Clouston) exclusive to descendants of Haakon Harvardson Klo, from whom the name derives. However, this is not supported by official records. All that can be correctly stated is that he had the same surname as these Cloustons.

== Discography ==
•Laugh to your Heart's Delight (1983)

•Cinderelly (1979)

•Proper 'Ting (1977)

•Spinnin' Yarns from Newfoundland (1975)

== Bibliography ==
•I'se the B'y : from Newfoundland with a New Catch Of-- Yarns (1989)

•Al Clouston’s Christmas Stories from Newfoundland (1988)

•When I Grow Too Old to Laugh, Shoot Me! (1986)

•Al Clouston's Collection of [old fashioned home style taste. Treats with yesterday's cooking secrets in these] Newfoundland Recipes (1983)

•We Rant and We Roar (1980)

•Come 'Ere Till I Tells Ya (1978)
