= Mary Xavier Molony =

Irish Presentation Sister

Sister Mary Xavier Molony, P.B.V.M. (August 1781 – 8 October 1865) was an Irish Presentation Sister, who was one of the first religious sisters to establish Catholic schools in the Newfoundland.

Baptised Belinda Molony to Francis and Catherine Maloney of Tulla, County Clare, she took the name Mary Xavier upon taking her vows as a Presentation Sister at Galway in 1825. In August 1833 Molony, Mother Mary Bernard Kirwan and two other sisters left Galway for Newfoundland to found a school for orphan girls, at the suggestion of Bishop Michael Anthony Fleming. The group was noted as the first nuns in Newfoundland.

They arrived at St. John's on 21 September, but as no word of their arrival reached their sister back in Galway for another four months, they were thought to be lost at sea. With the result, Solemn Requiem Mass was had for them, and the original copies of their vows were burned.

According to the Dictionary of Canadian Biography:

Within a few weeks of their arrival the sisters had gathered and divided into classes girls of poor families in the settlement. They began teaching in a room at the rear of an old tavern, the "Rising Sun." The curriculum included grammar, literature, arithmetic, French, music, needle work, and Christian doctrine. Attendance at the convent school rose from 450 in 1833 to 1,200 by 1844. Later boys and adults were also taught in the school. There were several moves before a new convent was built in December 1844, but the St John's fire of 9 June 1846 reduced it to ashes. The sisters, who numbered eight in 1846, moved to Bishop Fleming's farm on the outskirts of the city until Bishop John Thomas Mullock arranged for the construction of a new convent on Cathedral Square in 1850.

In 1853, Molony was made the first superior of the convent of Harbour Main, about 50 kilometres (31 mi) outside St. John's. It opened on 9 July 1853 and was attended by one hundred and eighty children. However, Molony became ill within three years and had to return to the mother house in St. John's where she remained for the remainder of her life. She occupied herself by painting pious pictures on satin and making altar ornaments. Mary Xavier Molony died, aged 84.
