= Grunia Movschovitch Ferman =

Grunia Movschovitch Ferman (1916-2004) was a WWII resistance fighter, nurse, businesswoman, and Holocaust remembrance activist.

== Early life ==
Grunia Movschovitch was born in Novogrudek in 1916. As a young woman, she took first aid courses and trained as a physical education teacher. As such she was pressed into service as a fitness trainer by the Russian army during its occupation of Western Poland (1939-41). She was forced to live in a ghetto, where, in 1941 she witnessed the execution of relatives and friends. After her brother was shot trying to escape and her father and another brother were sent to a concentration camp, she escaped. She briefly found shelter on a farm but had to leave as she posed a danger to the farm family. She found refuge in Naliboki Forest, in current-day Belarus, where she joined one of the organized camps of Jewish resistance fighters led by Tuvia Bielski.

There she worked as a nurse and married Lewis Ferman, a fellow partisan who had lost his wife and daughter to the Nazis in the extermination of the ghetto of Lida. Lewis Ferman brought to the partisans his specialist knowledge as an electrician and was active in sabotaging the German supply lines as well as in rescuing people from the ghetto.

Displaced after the war, the Fermans first went to Austria, then to Venice. In 1945, after surviving a bout of typhus, Grunia Ferman and her husband found shelter in a United Nations refugee camp in Rome where their daughter Leah was born in 1946.

== Life in Canada ==
Following the war, the existing Jewish community in St. John's welcomed 26 Holocaust survivor families to Newfoundland, though various governments and administrations of the day rejected 12,000 individual applications from Jewish would-be refugees to Newfoundland and Labrador. In 1947, the Ferman family moved from Rome to St. John's, not having heard of the place before their departure. In St. John's, Lewis Ferman bought a truck, had "Lewis Ferman and Co." painted on the side, and worked as an itinerant merchant.

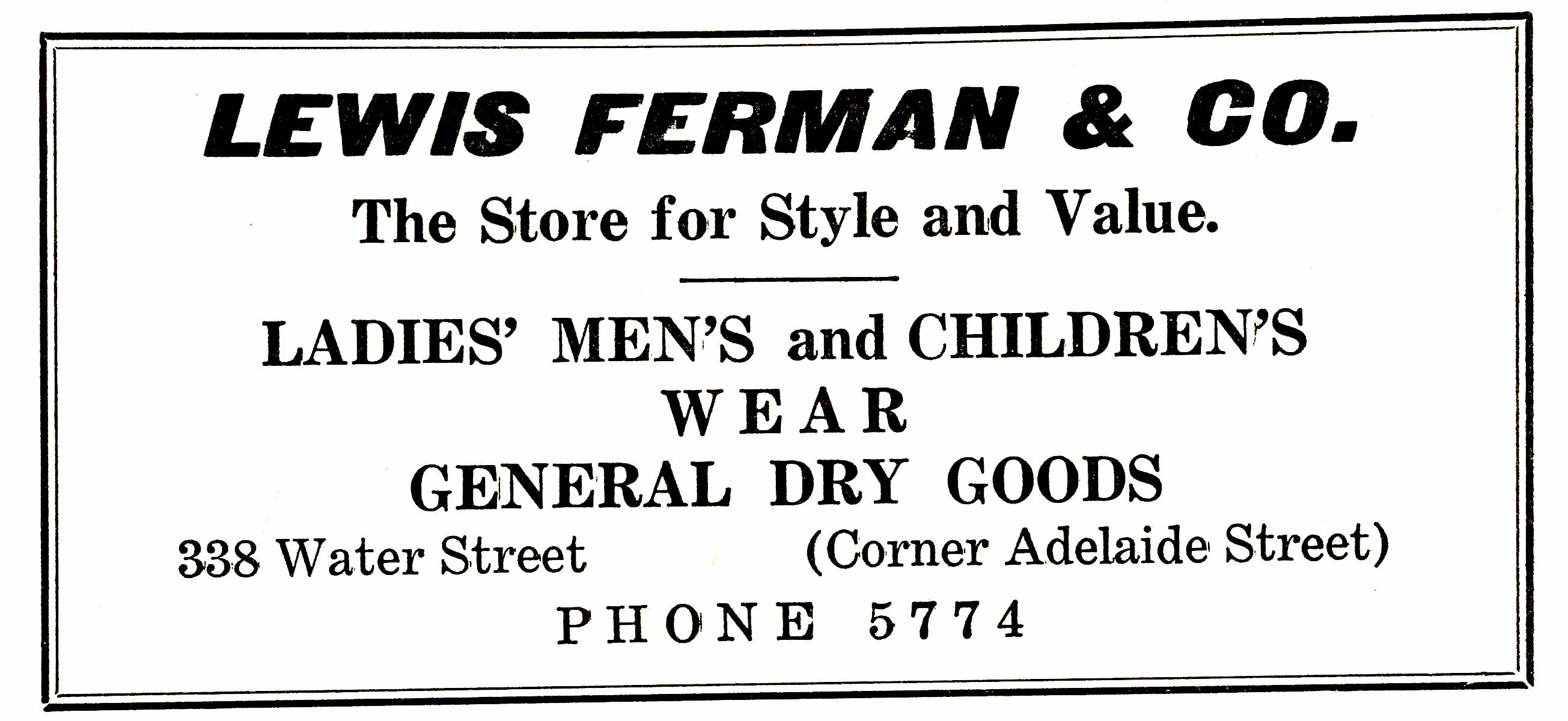
Lewis Ferman & Co. Ad, 1955

In 1952, their son Alan was born, and the Fermans opened Lewis Ferman & Co. - "The Store for Style and Value" - on the northwest corner of Water Street and Adelaide Street in St. John's:

The family's store on Water Street was both a place of business and a community meeting place. "They would come in to have a cup of coffee, or say hello, or talk about the weather," said [Alan] Ferman, who remembers working in the store as a child. "It was like a melting pot, the store. People from all over the Avalon would come there and talk and my father used to say, every one of the customers are really our friends."

On 11 February 1955, Grunia Ferman was sworn in as a full Canadian citizen.

The Fermans eventually had agent stores in Freshwater, as well as in Carbonear by 1959.

Ferman spoke nine different languages and, like her husband, acted as a translator in the community, often volunteering at hospitals to assist with visiting sailors. It was through this volunteer work that the Fermans were given, by a Polish sailor, a Torah from Chenstochov, Poland, which they gave to the St. John's Beth El synagogue circa 1972.

The store closed in 1988 and the Fermans moved to Toronto to be closer to their children and grandchildren. Lewis Ferman died 16 October 1989. Grunia died in 2004. Their daughter Leah (Belfon) died 18 April 2017.

== Holocaust remembrance ==
As Holocaust survivors in the 1970s, the Fermans were involved in initiating Holocaust remembrance events in St. John's. On 30 October 1995, Ferman was one of two survivors who presented the lecture Don't Tell Us the Holocaust Never Happened... We Were There in St. John's, as a response to Holocaust deniers. At the event, she was quoted as saying,

We have to try to erase racism in this world. We have to be more tolerant of other people, other races, no matter what colour skin they have, what kind of religion they have. They are human beings, and we should never forget that.

As part of the commemoration of the 50th anniversary of the liberation of Jewish concentration camps, Memorial University of Newfoundland awarded Grunia Ferman an honorary Doctor of Laws degree. The degree was given to her on the afternoon of 28 October 1995, as part of Memorial University's Fall Convocation. Her oration was given by Professor Shane O'Dea.

== Lewis Ferman & Co. sign discovery and conservation ==
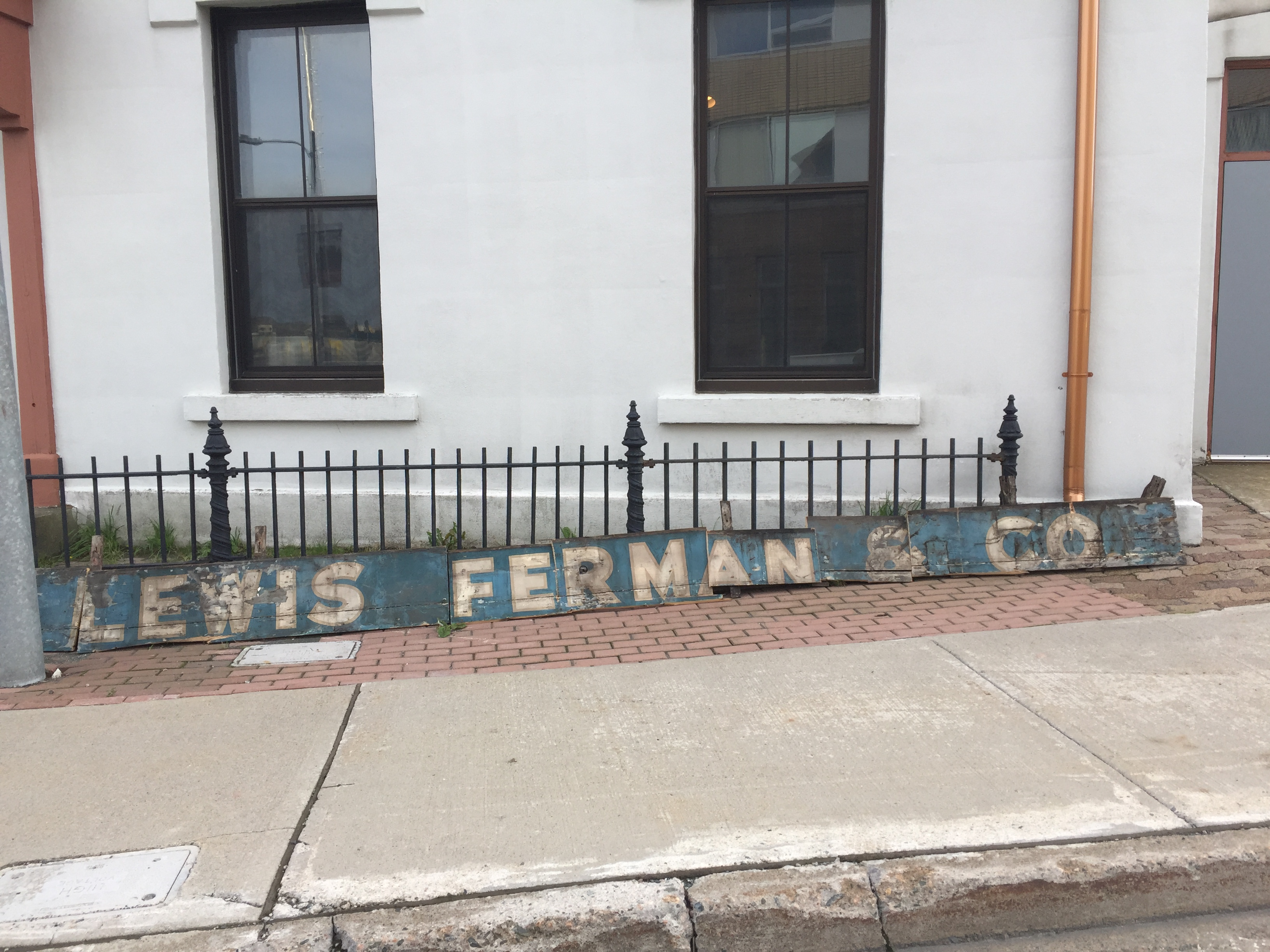
Lewis Ferman & Co. sign prior to conservation.

On 1 October 2018, Twitter user Brad Collins shared a photo of an old sign bearing the words "Lewis Ferman & Co." which had been uncovered during renovation work on a Subway restaurant franchise on Water Street in St. John's. Staff from the Heritage Foundation of Newfoundland and Labrador rushed to the site, to find that workers had already removed the sign, cutting it into pieces, and were prepared to take it to the landfill. They rescued the sign pieces, and took them to their office. From there, the sign was handed over to conservators at The Rooms Provincial Museum. News of the discovery made headlines locally and nationally.

Museum conservators faced several challenges with the sign, which had been cut into seven pieces: it needed to be acclimatized to the lab's temperature and humidity, dirt had to be removed without damaging the paint, and flaking paint had to be re-glued to the wood. It was planned that the sign would be added to a future Jewish exhibit at The Rooms.
