= Frederick George Chislett =

Frederick George Chislett (c1880 -1 January 1928) was a Newfoundland-born athlete, tombstone designer, carver, and businessperson. He was one of the first funerary monument entrepreneurs on the island to develop means for rural customers to place orders for cemetery markers and monuments by mail.

== Athletics ==
Chislett first came to notoriety in late Victorian-era St. John’s as a long-distance speed skater. He discovered his talent for ice-skating early on:

In 1897, at the age of seventeen, Frederick Chislett became the long-distance skating champion of St. John's by defeating F. Donnelly and W. Smithwicke, covering 8 km (5 mi) in 19:48. He defended his title many times, often against competitors brought in from outside Newfoundland. He set the record for the 5 km (3 mi) race in 1905, defeating R. Laidlaw of Halifax in 10:22.4.

Though short of stature, Chislett had a reputation as a fierce competitor. When he defeated Laidlaw he was honoured by writer James Murphy in a five verse (plus chorus) ditty sung to the tune “Mister Dooley” composed by Jean Schwartz. The song, entitled “Mister Laidlaw,” contains the rhyme:

In little Fred he found his match,

Though our pacer lad is small,

Laidlaw had a better chance to snatch

The sunbeams from a wall.

Chislett decided to retire from skating for good, while he remained the "undefeated skating champion of Newfoundland." Following his retirement, he wrote the following letter to a local newspaper:

Dear Sir. - Owing to the reports through the press and otherwise, I find it necessary to say that it is not my intention to take part in any future skating contests. I retired from competitive skating three years ago, then holding the championship for many years. I prefer seeing another competitor represent Newfoundland in the proposed race. Thanking you for space. I am. Yours truly, FREDERICK G. CHISLETT. St. John's, Feb. 24th, 1912.

== Funerary monuments ==
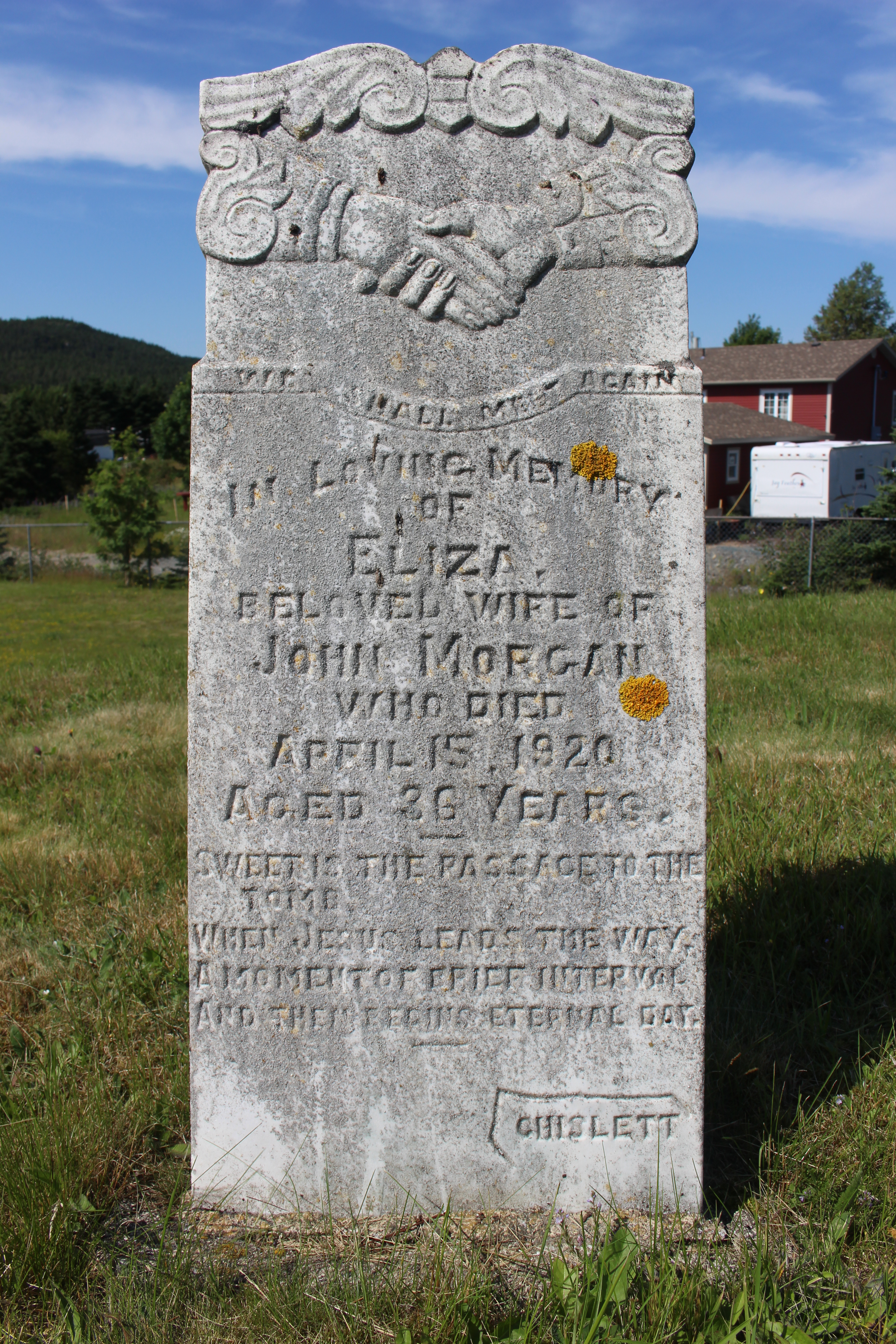
Marble grave marker carved by Chislett's Marble Works.

As early as 1904, Chislett had started working as a stonecutter in St. John's. Around the time of his retirement as a skater, Chislett began his career in the monument business in earnest. By 1915, he was the manager of Muir's Marble Works, then located at 260 Water Street, St. John's. The same year, he opened his own business, Chislett's Marble Works:

Our enterprising townsman, Mr Frederick Chislett, marble worker, who has for the past four years been manager of the ‘Muir Marble Works’ has decided to go into business for himself, and has taken that fine stand corner store of McMurdo's Lane opp. Baine Johnston's premises. Mr. Chislett since his apprenticeship has by good taste and carefulness coupled with sterling honesty and true integrity in all his business and social life, made a wide circle of friends in the city and outports. He starts at once with a large number of orders, and we have no doubt that he will be well patronized because of giving good value to every customer.

Chislett set up his shop in the corner shopfront in the range of buildings known as "Merchants Block" on Water Street By 1916, Chislett was advertising in various newspapers, offering to send potential rural customers design books and photographs of his work from which they could place an order. This allowed Chislett to expand business beyond the local St. John’s market, and Chislett stones can now be found in many cemeteries across the province, the Methodist cemetery at Freshwater, Conception Bay, being one example. Following World War I, Chislett expanded the business to create war memorials for soldiers and sailors, such as the one erected in Trinity in 1921.

Following Chislett's death in 1928, the business continued on into the 1930s, under manager Bruce Chislett. In 1928, the company was contracted to install a bronze memorial plaque commemorating the landing place of Sir Humphrey Gilbert.

== Personal life ==
On 10 July 1904 at the Gower Street parsonage, Chislett, an Anglican, married Irene Gillingham (c1887-1955), a Methodist, who was originally from Lower Island Cove. The 1921 census lists them as having at that point seven children: Bruce, Irene, Harold, Mildred, Hunter, Kenneth, and Edith Chislett. Memorialized for his deeds of charity, Chislett died on New Year’s Day in 1928 at age 47, having established a successful business. His cause of death was listed as cerebral haemorrhage. He left behind his wife Irene and nine children. Death records note him as belonging to the United Church of Canada, and he was buried in the General Protestant Cemetery in St. John's. Widow Irene Chislett died at her residence on Blackmarsh Road on February 7, 1955, mourned by five sons and four daughters.
