= Mary Bernard Kirwan =

Irish nun (1797–1857)

Reverend Mother Mary Bernard Kirwan, P.B.V.M. (1797 – 27 February 1857), was the leader of the first community of Presentation Sisters in North America and a teacher.

== Life ==
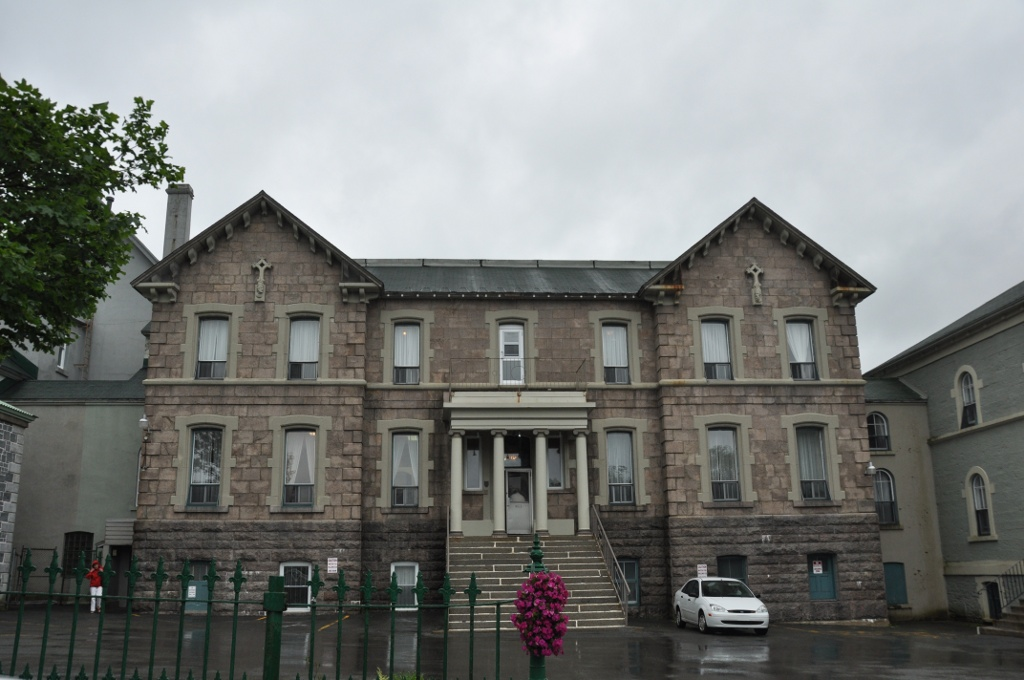
Presentation Convent, St. John's

Kirwan was born at Monivea, County Galway, to James and Ann Kirwan, in 1797. The family were one of the Tribes of Galway. She joined the Presentation Sisters in Galway in 1823. Ten years later, Bishop Michael Anthony Fleming visited the Presentation Convent at Galway with the aim of recruiting religious sisters to teach in Newfoundland. His object, he told Monsignor John Spratt of Dublin, was to establish "a system of education, that . . . would smooth the pillow of sickness, and soften the rigours of winter, by the diffusion of true Christian feeling." Four Sisters, including Kirwan and Mary Xavier Molony, volunteered for the mission. On 8 August, Kirwan was appointed "Superioress of the intended convent of St. John's, Newfoundland." Accompanied by Fleming, the nuns left Ireland on 11 August, arriving in St John's on 21 September. The passage was difficult for Kirwan, who wrote, "I was so ill for ten days I was almost insensible to everything. The Sisters thought I would never reach St. John's."

That year, Kirwan opened the first Presentation school in St. John's. "This country," Kirwan wrote in her first letter home, "is by no means as dreary as we heard. The bay is beautiful and so is the country as far as we can see."

Living in a building formerly used as a tavern, they had two bedrooms and a small parlour which served "for choir, refectory, community and all," with the rest of the building and a nearby disused slaughterhouse for teaching. By 1848, they offered instruction in spelling, reading, writing, English grammar, history (both sacred and secular), geography, arithmetic, natural history (taught from a book of the Irish National Schools), spinning, and needlework. In time they also trained teachers. In some communities, classes were held for older, illiterate girls who worked as domestic servants, arguably the beginning of adult education in Newfoundland.

Kirwan served first in St. John's before moving up the Southern Shore to Admiral's Cove. The Admiral's Cove convent opened 23 September 1853.

== Death ==
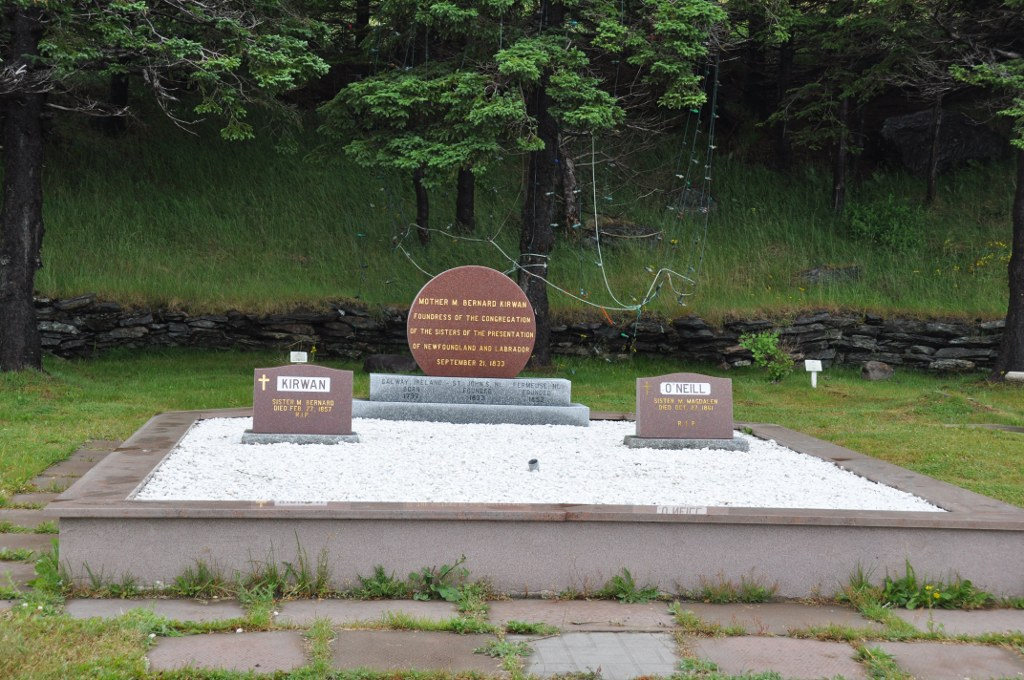
Mother M. Bernard Kirwan Memorial Municipal Heritage Site, Port Kirwan

After only a year in the community, Kirwan died. According to the convent records, "she was remarkable for a peculiar sweetness of disposition, exalted piety, unbounded Charity, and a burning zeal for the glory of God and the good of her neighbour; her death was like her life most holy." She was buried under the convent chapel.

In 1876, the Admiral's Cove convent burned down and the five Sisters moved to the centre of the parish at Renews. In 1940, the local priest decided to determine the exact location of her grave. When found, silver rings and rosary crucifixes from the corpses were removed, and given to the Presentation archives in St. John's. When a post office was established in Admiral's Cove in 1960, the town needed a new name to distinguish itself from similarly named communities; Admiral's Cove was renamed Port Kirwan. The Town of Port Kirwan Council designated the Reverend Mother's grave a Municipal Heritage Site on 27 February 2007.
