= Baird (surname) =

Baird is a common surname of primarily Scottish origins.

== A–L ==
- Absalom Baird (1824–1905), American Union Army general in the Civil War
- Allard Baird (born 1961), American baseball executive
- Andrew Baird (disambiguation), several people
- Andy Baird (born 1979), Scottish footballer
- Archie Baird (1919–2009), Scottish footballer
- Bill Baird (disambiguation), several people
- Billie Eilish Pirate Baird O'Connell (born 2001), American singer-songwriter
- Boydson H. Baird (1912–2010), American basketball coach
- Brian Baird (born 1956), American politician
- Briny Baird (born 1972), American golfer
- Bruce Baird (1942–2026), Australian politician, father of Mike and Julia
- Charles Baird (disambiguation), several people
- Chris Baird (born 1982), Northern Irish footballer
- Craig Baird (born 1972), New Zealand-born race car driver
- Dan Baird (born 1953), American musician, The Georgia Satellites
- David Baird (disambiguation), several people
- Des Baird (1888–1947), Australian footballer
- Diora Baird (born 1983), American actress and model
- Donna Baird, American epidemiologist and evolutionary-population biologist
- Dorothea Baird (1875–1933), English stage and film actress
- Doug Baird (disambiguation), several people
- Sir Dugald Baird (1899–1986), British doctor specializing in obstetrics and fertility
- Duncan Baird (born 1979), American politician from Arkansas
- Edgar Baird (1911–2005), Canadian businessman and park ranger
- Edith Baird (1859–1924), British chess composer
- Edward Baird (disambiguation), several people
- Finneas Baird O'Connell (born 1997), American musician and actor
- Francis Baird (1802–1864), engineer and owner of Baird Works
- Frank Baird (1912–2007), American basketball player
- George Baird (disambiguation), several people
- Hal Baird, American baseball coach
- Harry Baird (disambiguation), several people
- Helen Cowie (doctor) (1875–1956), born Helen Baird, New Zealand doctor
- Henry Biard (1892–1966), British pilot
- Henry Martyn Baird (1832–1906), American historian of the Huguenots
- Hugh Baird (disambiguation), several people
- Isabelle Turcotte Baird (born 1970), Canadian triathlete
- Jack Baird (born 1996), Scottish footballer
- James Baird (disambiguation), several people
- Jane Baird (1875 –1960), Scottish educator and Esperantist
- Jeanne Baird (1927–2020), American actress
- Jennifer Baird, British archaeologist
- Jeremy Baird, American drag queen known as Robbie Turner
- Jesse Baird (1997–2024), Australian television presenter and football umpire
- Jessie Little Doe Baird (born 1963), Native American linguist
- John Baird (disambiguation), several people
- John Logie Baird (1888–1946), inventor of the television
- Joseph E. Baird (1865–1942), American politician from Ohio
- Joyce Baird (1929–2015), British trade unionist
- Joyce Baird (diabetologist) (1929–2014), Scottish diabetes clinician and academic researcher
- Julia Baird (teacher) (born 1947), half-sister of John Lennon
- Julia Baird (journalist) (born 1967), Australian journalist, daughter of Bruce
- Julianne Baird (born 1952), American soprano
- Kingsley Baird (born 1957), New Zealand sculptor
- LaRoy Baird (1881–1950), American politician
- Leah Baird (1883–1971), silent film actress and screenwriter
- Leanne Baird, Canadian beauty queen

== M–Z ==
- Mamie Baird (1925–2012), Scottish journalist and author
- Margarite Frances Baird (1890–1970), American artist
- Matthew Baird (1817–1877), railroad and locomotive businessman
- Michael Baird (footballer) (born 1983), Australian football player
- Mike Baird (born 1968), Australian politician, son of Bruce
- Mike Baird (musician) (born 1951), drummer, Journey
- Mira Margaret Baird (1802–1878), American farmer and slave owner
- Pamela Baird (born 1945), American actress
- Patrick Douglas Baird (1912–1984), Scottish glaciologist
- Peter Baird (1952–2004), American actor and puppeteer, son of Bil
- Rick Baird (born 1974), American bobsledder
- Robert Baird (disambiguation), several people
- Roger Baird (born 1960), Scottish rugby player
- Sam Baird (born 1988), English snooker player
- Sammy Baird (1930–2010), Scottish footballer
- Scott Baird (born 1951), American curler, oldest athlete ever in the Winter Olympics
- Sharon Baird (born 1943), American actress
- Shiona Baird (born 1946), English politician
- Spencer Fullerton Baird (1823–1887), American ornithologist and ichthyologist
- Stuart Baird (born 1947), English film editor, producer, and director
- Susan Baird (1940–2009), Scottish politician from Glasgow
- Tadeusz Baird (1928–1981), Polish composer
- Theodore Baird (1901–1996), American academic
- Thomas D. Baird (1819–1873) American educator
- Travis Baird (born 1986), Australian footballer
- Vera Baird (born 1950), British politician and barrister
- William Baird (disambiguation), multiple people
- Zebulon Baird (1764–1824), American politician
- Zoë Baird (born 1952), American lawyer

== See also ==
- François-Auguste Biard (1800–1882), French painter
