= David Baird =

David Baird may refer to:

- Sir David Baird, 1st Baronet (1757–1829), British general
- Sir David Baird, 2nd Baronet (1795–1852), captain in the British army
- David Baird (author) (born 1956), Canadian author, composer and theatre director
- David Baird Sr. (1839–1927), U.S. Senator from New Jersey
- David Baird Jr. (1881–1955), his son, U.S. Senator from New Jersey
- David McCurdy Baird (1920–2019), Canadian geologist
- David Graham Baird (1854–1913), American chess master
- Davie Baird (1869–1946), Scottish international footballer

== See also ==
- Baird (surname)
