= Freedom of the City of Aberdeen =

The Freedom of the City of Aberdeen is an honour bestowed by the city of Aberdeen, Scotland.

== History ==
The Freedom of the City of Aberdeen has its origins in the 12th century, through the city's Guild of Burgesses. Certain respected residents would be granted free entry into the Guild, earning them the title of Free Burgess. Members of the Guild would have special trading rights, such as exemption from tolls, but would also be required to own arms and be prepared to use them in defence of the city.

Today, the Freedom of Aberdeen is a purely symbolic honour, which can be bestowed by Aberdeen City Council under the terms of Section 206 of the Local Government (Scotland) Act 1973, Part XI – 'Admission of honorary freemen'. The Act states that:

(1) A local authority may, by resolution passed by not less than two-thirds of the members voting thereon at a meeting of the authority the notice of which specifies the proposed admission as an item of business, admit to be honorary freemen of their area persons of distinction and any persons who have rendered eminent service to their area. (2) An officer designated for the purpose by local authority shall keep a roll containing the names of persons admitted to be freemen under this section.

Section 207 of the same Act – 'Limitation of rights of freemen' – further states that:

Nothing in this Part of this Act shall—

(a) confer any right of membership or any right or interest in the properties, funds, revenues or privileges of any guild or incorporation of crafts; or

(b) confer any right or interest in any burgess acres or any grazing rights connected therewith, or affect the law or practice existing at the commencement of this Act with reference to the use, enjoyment and administration of any such burgess acres or grazing rights.

== Individuals ==
Since the Reform Act, the Freedom of Aberdeen has been conferred on the following persons:

- 10 September 1834: Henry Brougham, former Lord Chancellor
- 1834: Walter Montagu Douglas Scott, 5th Duke of Buccleuch
- 1834: George Hay, 8th Marquess of Tweeddale
- 1836: William Hay, Lord Lieutenant of Aberdeenshire
- 1837: Charles Gordon-Lennox, former Postmaster General
- 1839: George Watt of Aberdeen, philanthropist (Old Mill Reformatory for Boys, now Woodend Hospital)
- 1840: George Sutherland-Leveson-Gower, 2nd Duke of Sutherland
- 1841: Robert Wallace, MP for Greenock
- 1841: Major George Thomson of Fairley, East India Company
- 1844: Samuel McKnight of South Carolina
- 1844: Rowland Hill, social reformer
- 7 September 1848: Prince Albert, husband of Queen Victoria
- 1849: Robert Peel, former Prime Minister of the United Kingdom
- 1853: George Howard, 7th Earl of Carlisle
- 1854: Joseph Hume, MP for Montrose Burghs
- 1858: Philip Stanhope, 5th Earl Stanhope
- 1859: David Ogilvy, 10th Earl of Airlie
- 28 September 1859: John Russell, Secretary of State for Foreign Affairs
- 1862: Edward Ellice, MP
- 20 September 1866: Edward VII, Prince of Wales
- 1871: William Ewart Gladstone, Prime Minister of the United Kingdom
- 1876: William Edward Forster, philanthropist
- 15 November 1878: Arthur Hamilton-Gordon, Governor of Fiji
- 1881: Sir John Anderson, Engineer and philanthropist
- 1883: John Hamilton-Gordon, Lord Lieutenant of Aberdeenshire
- 1883: R. A. Cross, former Home Secretary
- 1884: Archibald Primrose, 5th Earl of Rosebery
- 1888: John Campbell, former Governor General of Canada
- 1890: William Alexander Hunter, MP for Aberdeen North
- 1890: Henry Morton Stanley, explorer
- 5 July 1892: Andrew Carnegie, philanthropist
- 10 April 1901: Charles William Mitchell, son of shipbuilder Charles Mitchell
- 27 April 1901: George Stephen, 1st Baron Mount Stephen, philanthropist (presented at Aberdeen 27 August 1901)
- 9 April 1902: Donald Smith, 1st Baron Strathcona and Mount Royal, philanthropist and Lord Rector of the University of Aberdeen
- 29 August 1913: Frederick Roberts, 1st Earl Roberts, military commander
- 29 August 1918: William Morris Hughes, 7th Prime Minister of Australia
- 11 July 1919: Douglas Haig, military commander
- 16 August 1926: Weetman Pearson, 1st Viscount Cowdray
- 24 October 1927: Sir Robert Williams, explorer, miner and railroad developer
- 26 September 1928: John Jellicoe, 2nd Governor-General of New Zealand
- 26 September 1928: Sir Thomas Jaffrey of Edgehill
- 26 September 1928: Robert Laws, missionary
- 7 October 1931: James Murray, former MP for East Aberdeenshire
- 7 October 1931: George Adam Smith, Principal of the University of Aberdeen
- 20 September 1935: James Meston, 1st Baron Meston
- 20 September 1935: George Milne, military commander
- 19 June 1937: William Lyon Mackenzie King, 10th Prime Minister of Canada
- 19 June 1937: Joseph Aloysius Lyons, 10th Prime Minister of Australia
- 31 July 1941: Peter Fraser, 24th Prime Minister of New Zealand
- 1942: Jan Smuts, 4th Prime Minister of South Africa
- 27 July 1943: John Gilbert Winant, U.S. Ambassador to the United Kingdom
- 27 July 1943: Vi-Kyuin Wellington Koo, former Premier of the Republic of China
- 27 April 1946: Winston Churchill, Leader of the Conservative Party
- 16 March 1949: John Boyd Orr, Nobel Prize winner and first director of the Rowett Research Institute
- 16 March 1949: Thomas Johnston, former Secretary of State for Scotland
- 5 June 1956: Clement Attlee, former Prime Minister of the United Kingdom
- 5 June 1956: Alexander Steven Bilsland, 1st Baron Bilsland
- 25 May 1959: Queen Elizabeth the Queen Mother
- 21 June 1966: Sir Dugald Baird, medical doctor
- 21 June 1966: Lady May Baird, medical doctor and town councillor
- 21 June 1966: Thomas Dunlop Galbraith, former Minister of State for Scotland
- 9 October 1981: Mary Esslemont, former chair of the British Medical Association
- 29 November 1984: Nelson Mandela, anti-apartheid activist, and his wife, Winifred Mandela
- 6 December 1993: Mikhail Sergeyevich Gorbachev, former President of the Soviet Union
- 18 November 1995: Alex C. Collie, former Lord Provost of Aberdeen
- 30 March 1999: Alex Ferguson, football manager
- 14 August 2004: John Rowland Mallard, medical physicist and university professor
- 20 April 2008: George Donald, William "Buff" Hardie, and Stephen Robertson, comedy trio better known as Scotland the What?
- 25 November 2017: Denis Law, Scottish Football Player.
- 12th May 2023 Aberdeen FC "The Gothenburg Greats":
  - Archie Knox
  - Jim Leighton
  - Doug Rougvie
  - Willie Miller
  - Alex Mcleish
  - John McMaster
  - Stuart Kennedy
  - Neale Cooper (posthumously)
  - Dougie Bell
  - Gordon Strachan
  - Neil Simpson
  - Ian Angus
  - Bryan Gunn
  - Eric Black
  - Mark McGhee
  - John Hewitt

== Military Units ==
- 20 August 1949: The Colonel, Officers and other Ranks of the Gordon Highlanders
- 8 June 1992: HMS Scylla, RN
- 1 July 2006: Highlanders, 4th Battalion, The Royal Regiment of Scotland

== Organisations and Groups ==
- 11 February 1995: University of Aberdeen, in its Quincentenary year
- 12 May 2023: The Aberdeen Football Club
