= Robert Baird =

Robert Baird may refer to:

- Sir Robert Baird, 1st Baronet (1630–1697), Scottish merchant, landowner, and Cashier of the Carolina Society
- Sir Robert Baird, 3rd Baronet (c. 1690–1740), of the Baird baronets
- Robert Baird (clergyman) (1789–1863), American clergyman and author
- Robert Baird (cyclist) (born 1942), Australian cyclist
- Robert Baird (flying ace) (1921–1992), American Marine flying ace
- Robert Baird (swimmer) (born 1973), Canadian medley swimmer
- Robert L. Baird (1920–2005), American jockey
- Robert L. Baird, screenplay writer on Curious George (film) and others
- Robert W. Baird (1883–1968), American businessman
  - Robert W. Baird & Company
- Bob Baird (1940–1974), American baseball player
