= St. John's Centre =

Provincial electoral district in Newfoundland and Labrador, Canada

Newfoundland and Labrador electoral district
- Location in the St. John's area

Provincial electoral district
- Legislature: Newfoundland and Labrador House of Assembly
MHA
Jim Dinn
New Democratic
- District created: 1956
- First contested: 1956
- Last contested: 2025

Demographics
- Population (2011): 14,354
- Electors (2015): 9,732
- Area (km²): 5
- Census division: Division No. 1
- Census subdivision: St. John's (part)

St. John's Centre is a provincial electoral district for the House of Assembly of Newfoundland and Labrador, Canada. Much of the former district of St. John's Centre was renamed St. John's East in 1996. In 2011, there were 7,846 eligible voters living within the district.

The district is bounded largely by Columbus Drive to the west, LeMarchant Road to the south, Parade Street to the east and Empire Avenue to the north. The residents are mostly working and middle-class.

Historically voters in the district have elected a member on the government side. A Progressive Conservative bastion for many years after Confederation, and an anti-Confederation area before that, St. John's Centre shifted Liberal during the Wells and Tobin eras, though by fairly small margins. In 2011, NDP star candidate Gerry Rogers defeated PC cabinet minister Shawn Skinner. She was re-elected in 2015 and became NDP leader in 2018. Rogers retired in 2019; however, former Newfoundland and Labrador Teachers' Association president Jim Dinn held the seat for the NDP. Dinn became interim NDP leader in 2021, and permanent leader in 2023.

== Members of the House of Assembly ==
The district has elected the following members of the House of Assembly:

Assembly	Years	Member	Party
31st	1956–1959	Augustine Michael Duffy	Progressive Conservative
32nd	1959–1962	Augustine Michael Duffy	United Newfoundland
33rd	1962–1966	Anthony Joseph Murphy	Progressive Conservative
34th	1966–1971	Anthony Joseph Murphy	Progressive Conservative
35th	1972–1972	Anthony Joseph Murphy	Progressive Conservative
36th	1972–1975	Anthony Joseph Murphy	Progressive Conservative
37th	1975–1979	Anthony Joseph Murphy	Progressive Conservative
38th	1979–1982	Patrick McNicholas	Progressive Conservative
39th	1982–1985	Patrick McNicholas	Progressive Conservative
40th	1985–1989	Patrick McNicholas	Progressive Conservative
41st	1989–1993	Hubert Kitchen	Liberal
42nd	1993–1996	Hubert Kitchen	Liberal
43rd	1996–1999	Joan Marie Aylward	Liberal
44th	1999–2003	Joan Marie Aylward	Liberal
45th	2003–2007	Shawn Skinner	Progressive Conservative
46th	2007–2011	Shawn Skinner	Progressive Conservative
47th	2011–2015	Gerry Rogers	New Democratic
48th	2015–2019	Gerry Rogers	New Democratic
49th	2019–2021	Jim Dinn	New Democratic
50th	2021–2025	Jim Dinn	New Democratic
51st	2025–present	Jim Dinn	New Democratic

== Election results ==
Graph of election results (minor parties that never got 2% of the vote or did not run consistently are omitted) View source data.

2025 Newfoundland and Labrador general election
Party	Candidate	Votes	%	±%
New Democratic	Jim Dinn	2,398	62.16	+9.78
Liberal	Gemma Hickey	1,003	26.00	-7.60
Progressive Conservative	Ben Duggan	457	11.85	-2.18
Total valid votes		3,858		
Total rejected ballots				
Turnout				
Eligible voters				
New Democratic hold		Swing		+8.69

2021 Newfoundland and Labrador general election
Party	Candidate	Votes	%	±%
New Democratic	Jim Dinn	1,991	52.38	+5.45
Liberal	Gemma Hickey	1,277	33.60	+8.06
Progressive Conservative	Robyn LeGrow	533	14.02	-13.51
Total valid votes		3,801	99.01	
Total rejected ballots		38	0.99	
Turnout		3,839	38.92	
Eligible voters		9,864		
New Democratic hold		Swing		-1.30
Source(s) "Officially Nominated Candidates General Election 2021" (PDF). Elections Newfoundland and Labrador. "NL Election 2021 (Unofficial Results)".

2019 Newfoundland and Labrador general election
Party	Candidate	Votes	%	±%
New Democratic	Jim Dinn	2,218	46.93	-0.70
Progressive Conservative	Jonathan Galgay	1,301	27.53	+16.89
Liberal	Seamus O'Keefe	1,207	25.54	-16.19
Total valid votes		4,726	99.56	
Total rejected ballots		21	0.44	-0.12
Turnout		4,747	48.60	+0.99
Electors on the lists		9,767	–	
New Democratic hold		Swing		-8.80
Source: Elections Newfoundland and Labrador

2015 Newfoundland and Labrador general election
Party	Candidate	Votes	%	±%
New Democratic	Gerry Rogers	2,195	47.64	-6.80
Liberal	Lynn Sullivan	1,923	41.73	+39.42
Progressive Conservative	Kathie Hicks	490	10.63	-32.62
Total valid votes		4,608	99.44	–
Total rejected ballots		26	0.56	–
Turnout		4,634	47.62	-14.90
Eligible voters		9,732		
New Democratic hold		Swing		-23.11
Source: Elections Newfoundland and Labrador

2011 Newfoundland and Labrador general election
Party	Candidate	Votes	%	±%
New Democratic	Gerry Rogers	2,569	54.44	+39.52
Progressive Conservative	Shawn Skinner	2,041	43.25	-33.24
Liberal	Carly Bigelow	109	2.31	-6.28
Total valid votes		4,719	99.73	–
Total rejected ballots		13	0.27	–
Turnout		4,732	62.52	+4.63
Eligible voters		7,569		
New Democratic gain from Progressive Conservative		Swing		+36.22
Source: Elections Newfoundland and Labrador

2007 Newfoundland and Labrador general election
Party	Candidate	Votes	%	±%
Progressive Conservative	Shawn Skinner	3,332	76.49	+21.30
New Democratic	Jane Robinson	650	14.92	-0.84
Liberal	Lori Ann Campbell-Martino	374	8.59	-20.46
Total valid votes		4,356	99.41	–
Total rejected ballots		26	0.59	–
Turnout		4,382	57.89	-2.42
Eligible voters		7,569		
Progressive Conservative hold		Swing		+11.07
Source: Elections Newfoundland and Labrador

2003 Newfoundland and Labrador general election
Party	Candidate	Votes	%	±%
Progressive Conservative	Shawn Skinner	3,349	55.19	+15.61
Liberal	Joan Marie Aylward	1,763	29.05	-13.22
New Democratic	Carol Cantwell	956	15.76	-2.39
Total valid votes		6,068	99.33	–
Total rejected ballots		41	0.67	–
Turnout		6,109	59.68	-0.57
Eligible voters		10,236		
Progressive Conservative gain from Liberal		Swing		+14.42
Source: Elections Newfoundland and Labrador

1999 Newfoundland and Labrador general election
Party	Candidate	Votes	%	±%
Liberal	Joan Marie Aylward	2,609	42.27	-0.78
Progressive Conservative	Paul Brown	2,443	39.58	+1.96
New Democratic	Valerie Long	1,120	18.15	-1.18
Total valid votes		6,172	99.29	–
Total rejected ballots		44	0.71	–
Turnout		6,216	60.25	-5.63
Eligible voters		10,317		
Liberal hold		Swing		-1.37
Source: Elections Newfoundland and Labrador

1996 Newfoundland and Labrador general election
Party	Candidate	Votes	%	±%
Liberal	Joan Marie Aylward	2,579	43.05	-4.20
Progressive Conservative	Paul Brown	2,254	37.62	-1.32
New Democratic	Wayne Lucas	1,158	19.33	+5.52
Total valid votes		5,991	99.42	–
Total rejected ballots		35	0.58	–
Turnout		6,026	65.88	-0.11
Eligible voters		9,147		
Liberal hold		Swing		-2.76
Source: Elections Newfoundland and Labrador

1993 Newfoundland and Labrador general election
Party	Candidate	Votes	%	±%
Liberal	Hubert Kitchen	2,990	47.25	+1.11
Progressive Conservative	Paul Stapleton	2,464	38.94	-5.20
New Democratic	Fraser March	874	13.81	+4.09
Total valid votes		6,328	99.45	–
Total rejected ballots		35	0.55	–
Turnout		6,363	65.99	-13.53
Eligible voters		9,643		
Liberal hold		Swing		+3.16
Source: Elections Newfoundland and Labrador

1989 Newfoundland and Labrador general election
Party	Candidate	Votes	%	±%
Liberal	Hubert Kitchen	2,967	46.14	+12.04
Progressive Conservative	Patrick McNicholas	2,838	44.14	-6.83
New Democratic	Vicki Silk	625	9.72	-5.21
Total valid votes		6,430	99.84	–
Total rejected ballots		10	0.16	–
Turnout		6,440	79.52	+5.97
Eligible voters		8,099		
Liberal gain from Progressive Conservative		Swing		+9.44
Source: Elections Newfoundland and Labrador

1985 Newfoundland general election
Party	Candidate	Votes	%	±%
Progressive Conservative	Patrick McNicholas	3,332	50.97	-20.30
Liberal	Mary Frances Philpott	2,229	34.10	+14.23
New Democratic	Nina Patey	976	14.93	+6.07
Total valid votes		6,537	99.68	–
Total rejected ballots		21	0.32	–
Turnout		6,558	73.55	+0.75
Eligible voters		8,916		
Progressive Conservative hold		Swing		-17.27
Source: Elections Newfoundland and Labrador

1982 Newfoundland general election
Party	Candidate	Votes	%	±%
Progressive Conservative	Patrick McNicholas	2,357	71.27	+11.13
Liberal	John L. Slattery	657	19.87	-1.52
New Democratic	Robert Harry E. Cuff	293	8.86	-3.57
Total valid votes		3,307	99.07	–
Total rejected ballots		31	0.93	–
Turnout		3,338	72.80	-6.61
Eligible voters		4,585		
Progressive Conservative hold		Swing		+6.33
Source: Elections Newfoundland and Labrador

1979 Newfoundland general election
Party	Candidate	Votes	%	±%
Progressive Conservative	Patrick McNicholas	2,173	60.14	+0.56
Liberal	Hugh Joseph Shea	773	21.39	-2.69
New Democratic	Valerie Anne Summers	449	12.43	+12.43
Independent	Lewis Murphy	128	3.54	+3.54
Independent	Dorothy Mary Wyatt	90	2.49	+2.49
Total valid votes		3,613	99.23	–
Total rejected ballots		28	0.77	–
Turnout		3,641	79.41	+13.33
Eligible voters		4,585		
Progressive Conservative hold		Swing		+1.63
Source: Elections Newfoundland and Labrador

1975 Newfoundland general election
Party	Candidate	Votes	%	±%
Progressive Conservative	Anthony Joseph Murphy	2,366	59.58	-16.88
Liberal	William Doyle	956	24.08	+0.54
Reform Liberal	John Coyle	649	16.34	+16.34
Total valid votes		3,971	99.45	–
Total rejected ballots		22	0.55	–
Turnout		3,993	66.08	-7.53
Eligible voters		6,043		
Progressive Conservative hold		Swing		-8.71
Source: Elections Newfoundland and Labrador

1972 Newfoundland general election
Party	Candidate	Votes	%	±%
Progressive Conservative	Anthony Joseph Murphy	3,580	76.46	+9.03
Liberal	Denis Murphy	1,102	23.54	-5.41
Total valid votes		4,682	99.19	–
Total rejected ballots		38	0.81	–0.15
Turnout		4,720	73.61	-12.98
Eligible voters		6,412		
Progressive Conservative hold		Swing		+7.22
Source: Elections Newfoundland and Labrador

1971 Newfoundland general election
Party	Candidate	Votes	%
Progressive Conservative	Anthony Joseph Murphy	3,708	67.43
Liberal	Leonard Levitz	1,592	28.95
Independent	David Owens	109	1.98
New Democratic	Graham Kelly	90	1.64
Total valid votes		5,499	99.05
Total rejected ballots		53	0.95
Turnout		5,552	86.59
Eligible voters		6,412	
Source: Canadian Elections Database

== See also ==
- List of Newfoundland and Labrador provincial electoral districts
- Canadian provincial electoral districts
