= Patrick McNicholas =

Canadian politician

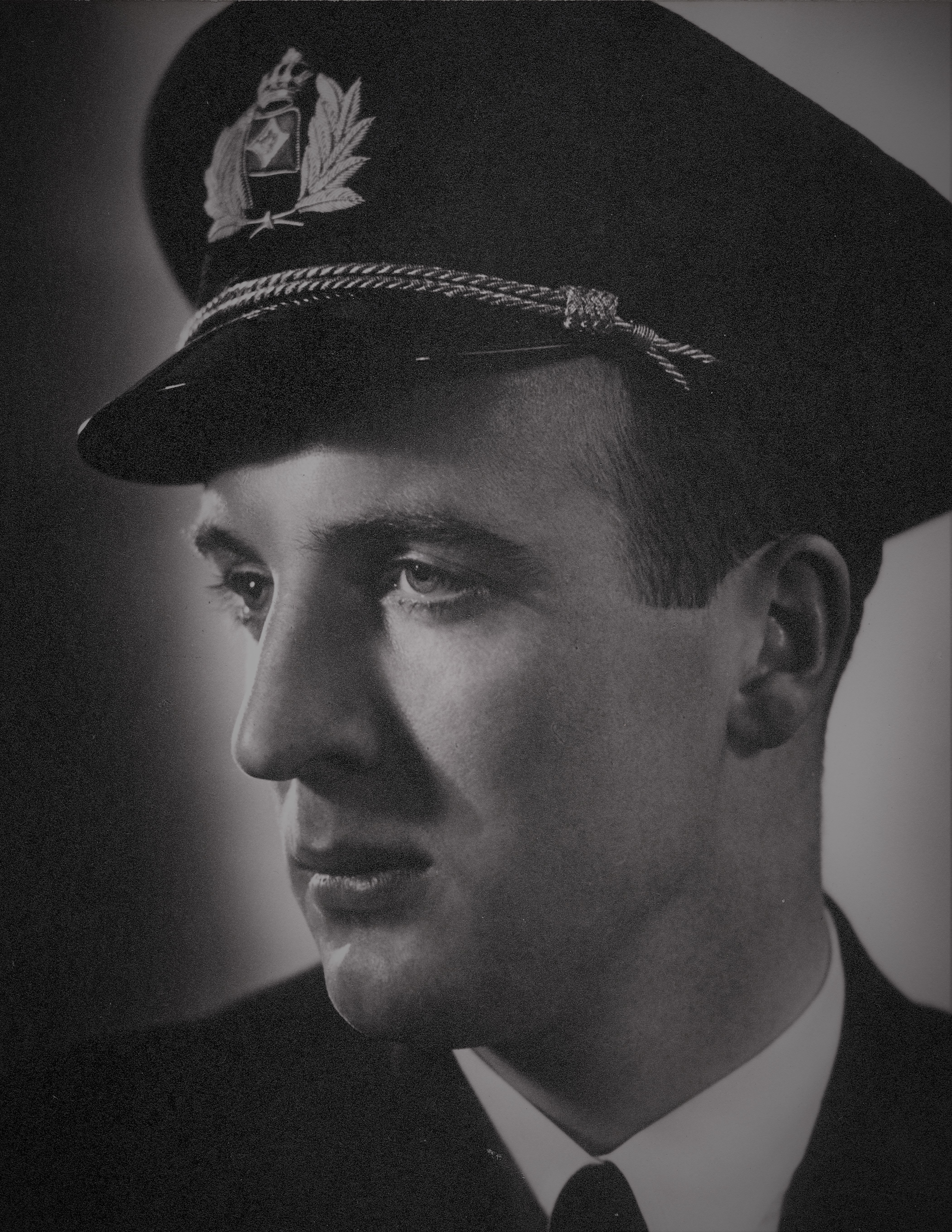

Speaker of the Newfoundland House of Assembly
- In office 1985–1989
- Preceded by: James Russell
- Succeeded by: Tom Lush

Member of the House of Assembly for St. John's Centre
- In office 1975-1989
- Preceded by: Anthony Murphy
- Succeeded by: Hubert Kitchen

Personal details
- Born: 15 April 1919 Galway, United Kingdom
- Died: 1990 (aged 70–71) St. John's, Newfoundland and Labrador, Canada
- Party: Progressive Conservative
- Spouse: Isabelle McNicholas
- Children: 6; John, Susan, Judith, Yvonne, Peter, Michael Aidan
- Education: University College Dublin
- Occupation: physician

Military service
- Branch/service: Irish Red Cross Society
- Battles/wars: Second World War

Patrick John McNicholas (15 April 1919 – 1990) was an Irish-born politician and political figure in Newfoundland. He represented St. John's Centre in the Newfoundland and Labrador House of Assembly from 1979 to 1989 as a member of the Progressive Conservative Party of Newfoundland.

Patrick McNicholas was born in Galway, in the West of Ireland on 15 April 1919. He studied medicine in London and at University College Dublin in Dublin, Ireland. He qualified as a physician in Dublin in 1941 at the age of 21. He worked as a medical doctor with the Irish Red Cross Society in France following the D-Day landings and the Allied invasion of France in 1944.

Subsequently, he lived and practiced ophthalmology at 16, Denny St. Tralee, Ireland, until emigrating to Canada.

(The house and practice was then bought by Dr Patrick J O'Donnell.)

He immigrated to Canada in 1955 with his wife, Isabelle (née. Van Vliet) and his (then) three children, John, Susan and Judith. He established an Ophthalmology practice in St. John's with his partner, Dr. Peter Lockwood. Patrick and Isabelle had three more children who were born in Newfoundland, Yvonne, Peter and Michael Aidan (b. 21 Nov 1965).

McNicholas served on a number of civic and charitable boards in Newfoundland including President of the Red Cross Society in Newfoundland, President of the Crow's Nest Officers' Club and Rotary International (St. John's Chapter).

McNicholas first entered politics in 1977 when he unsuccessfully ran for mayor of St. John's. He entered Newfoundland provincial politics in 1979 running in the district of St. John's Centre for the PC Party in the 1979 general election which resulted in the PC Party coming to power in Newfoundland under Premier Brian Peckford. He was first elected as a Member of the House of Assembly (MHA) on 18 June 1979 and was re-elected twice subsequently for the same seat.

McNicholas was elected as speaker for the Newfoundland House of Assembly on April 25, 1985 (replacing James Russell who was named Minister of Consumer Affairs and Communications) and served as speaker until 1989. McNicholas was defeated in 1989 general election which resulted in the Liberal Party under the leadership of Premier Clyde Wells forming a new government.

He died in St. John's in 1990.
