= Bill Baird =

Bill Baird may refer to:

- Bill Baird (activist) (born 1932), reproductive rights pioneer, founder of the Pro Choice League
- Bill Baird (American football) (born 1939), American football player
- Bill Baird (musician), American experimental musician
- Bill Baird (racing driver) (born 1949), American race car driver

== See also ==
- Bil Baird (1904–1987), American puppeteer
- William Baird (disambiguation)
