= Hugh Baird =

Hugh Baird may refer to:

- Hugh Baird (cricketer) (1911–1965), Australian cricketer (Victoria)
- Hugh Baird (engineer) (1770–1827), Scottish civil engineer
- Hugh Baird (footballer) (1930–2006), Scottish footballer (Airdrieonians, Leeds United, Aberdeen FC, national team)

== See also ==
- Hugh Baird College, Merseyside, England
