= Joanne McDonald =

Personal information
- Born: 1952 (age 72–73) St. John’s, Newfoundland and Labrador
- Home town: St. Mary's, Newfoundland and Labrador

Sport
- Country: Canada
- Sport: Wheelchair basketball; Para-athletics; Table tennis

Joanne McDonald OC ONL (born 1952) is a Canadian wheelchair sport athlete and disability rights advocate. She played on the Canadian women’s national wheelchair basketball team from 1974 to 1985 and competed at the 1976, 1980, and 1984 Paralympic Games. In para-athletics, McDonald won medals in women's slalom 5 in 1976 and 1980.

== Career ==
=== Sport ===
During her career, McDonald competed for Canada in a variety of sports including wheelchair basketball, para-athletics (wheelchair slalom), and table tennis. From 1974 to 1985, she represented Canada in wheelchair basketball competing on the Canadian women’s national wheelchair basketball team. At the 1976 Summer Paralympics, she won silver in women's slalom 5. McDonald won gold in the same event at the 1980 Summer Paralympics.

She was inducted into the SportNL Hall of Fame in 1993. She became a member of the Order of Newfoundland and Labrador in 2004 and an Officer of the Order of Canada in 2008. McDonald received an honorary doctor of laws from Memorial University in 2016. In 2020, she was inducted into the Wheelchair Basketball Canada Hall of Fame.

=== Advocacy ===
With Mary Reid, McDonald co-created History of Disability Rights N.L., an organization that collects, preserves, and promotes disability history in Newfoundland and Labrador.

== Personal life ==
She was born in St. John's, Newfoundland and Labrador in 1952 with spina bifida. She grew up in St. Mary's.
