= Donald B. Dingwell =

Canadian geologist (born 1958)

Donald B. Dingwell FRS FRSC OC ONL
- Born: Donald Bruce Dingwell; 29 June 1958 (age 68); Corner Brook, Newfoundland
- Education: Memorial University of Newfoundland, University of Alberta
- Awards: Officer of the Order of Canada (2020)
- Scientific career
- Fields: Experimental geosciences
- Workplaces: Carnegie Institution of Washington (1984–1986); University of Toronto (1986–1987); Bayerisches Geoinstitut (1987–2000); LMU Munich (2000–present)
- Thesis: Investigation of the role of fluorine in silicate melts: implications for igneous petrogenesis (1986)
- Doctoral advisor: Christopher M. Scarfe

Donald Bruce Dingwell FRS FRSC OC ONL (born 1958) is a Canadian geoscientist who is the director of the Department of Earth and Environmental Sciences and Ordinarius for Mineralogy and Petrology of LMU Munich. Since 2025, he is also president of the Academia Europaea. From September 2011 to December 2013, he was the third and last secretary general of the European Research Council (ERC), where he embarked on a global participation campaign for the ERC. He is also a past-President of the European Geosciences Union and the current past-president of the International Association of Volcanology and Chemistry of the Earth's Interior (IAVCEI), founded in 1919.

== Career ==
Dingwell was born in Corner Brook, Newfoundland, Canada. He began his research career at the Carnegie Institution of Washington (now Carnegie Institution for Science) where he was a Carnegie Fellow, from 1984 to 1986, working at the Geophysical Laboratory. His first permanent (tenure-track) appointment was to the University of Toronto as assistant professor. In 1987, he moved to the newly founded Bavarian Institute of Experimental Geochemistry and Geophysics (Bavarian Geo-institute) at the University of Bayreuth where he served as assistant to the founding Director Friedrich Seifert. Dingwell has been based at his present position as Professor of Mineralogy and Petrology in the Faculty of Geosciences of LMU Munich since 2000. He has also served as the director of the Department of Earth and Environmental Sciences, since its founding in 2002.

== Awards and honours ==
Dingwell has been awarded the Arthur L. Day Medal of the Geological Society of America. In December 2019, the Governor General of Canada announced that Dingwell had been made an Officer of the Order of Canada. Dingwell was similarly made a Member of the Order of Newfoundland and Labrador in 2021.

In 2017, he became a member of the German Academy of Sciences Leopoldina.

In 2020, he was awarded the Arthur Holmes Medal by the European Geosciences Union

== Select publications ==
- Giordano, Daniele; Russell, James; Dingwell, Donald (2008). "Viscosity of magmatic liquids: A model". Earth and Planetary Science Letters. 271 (1–4): 123–134. Bibcode:2008E&PSL.271..123G. doi:10.1016/j.epsl.2008.03.038. Wikidata Q63090682.
- Mikhail Alidibirov; Dingwell, Donald (1996). "Magma fragmentation by rapid decompression". Nature. 380 (6570): 146–148. Bibcode:1996Natur.380..146A. doi:10.1038/380146a0. Wikidata Q59061743.
- Jonathan M Castro; Dingwell, Donald (2009). "Rapid ascent of rhyolitic magma at Chaitén volcano, Chile". Nature. 461 (7265): 780–783. Bibcode:2009Natur.461..780C. doi:10.1038/nature08458. PMID 19812671. Wikidata Q39940671.
