= Order of Newfoundland and Labrador =

Canadian civilian honour for merit

- Insignia of the Order of Newfoundland and Labrador

Awarded by the lieutenant governor of Newfoundland and Labrador
- Type: Order of merit (provincial)
- Founded: 24 May 2001
- Eligibility: Canadian citizens currently or formerly residents of the province, save for politicians and judges while in office.
- Awarded for: Demonstration of excellence and achievement in any field of endeavour benefiting in an outstanding manner the province and its residents.
- Status: Currently constituted
- Founder: Arthur House
- Chancellor: Joan Marie Aylward
- Grades: Member
- Post-nominals: ONL

Statistics
- Total inductees: 151

Precedence
- Next (higher): Order of Nova Scotia
- Next (lower): Order of Nunavut
- Ribbon bar of the order

The Order of Newfoundland and Labrador (Note: French: Ordre du Terre-Neuve-et-Labrador) is a civilian honour for merit in the Canadian province of Newfoundland and Labrador. Instituted in 2001, when Lieutenant Governor Arthur Maxwell House granted royal assent to the Order of Newfoundland and Labrador Act, the order is administered by the Governor-in-Council and is intended to honour current or former Newfoundland and Labrador residents for conspicuous achievements in any field, being thus described as the highest honour amongst all others conferred by the Newfoundland and Labrador Crown.

== Structure and appointment ==
The Order of Newfoundland and Labrador is intended to honour any current or former longtime resident of Newfoundland and Labrador who has demonstrated a high level of individual excellence and achievement in any field, having "demonstrated excellence and achievement in any field of endeavour benefiting in an outstanding manner Newfoundland and Labrador and its residents." There are no limits on how many can belong to the order, though inductions are limited to eight per year; Canadian citizenship is a requirement, and those who are elected or appointed members of a governmental body are ineligible as long as they hold office.

The process of finding qualified individuals begins with submissions from the public to the Secretary of the Order of Newfoundland and Labrador Advisory Council, which consists of the Clerk of the Executive Council and five persons appointed by the lieutenant governor: two Members of the Order of Newfoundland and Labrador and four other individuals. This committee then meets at least once annually to make its selected recommendations to the Executive Council and works with that body in narrowing down the potential appointees to a list that will be submitted to the lieutenant governor; posthumous nominations are not accepted, though an individual who dies after his or her name was submitted to the Advisory Council can still be retroactively made a Member of the Order of Newfoundland and Labrador. Further, anyone not meeting the requirements of admission may be invested as an honorary Member. The lieutenant governor, ex officio a Member and the Chancellor of the Order of Newfoundland and Labrador, then makes all appointments into the fellowship's single grade of membership by an Order in Council that bears the viceroyal sign-manual and the Great Seal of the province; thereafter, the new Members are entitled to use the post-nominal letters ONL.

== Insignia ==
Upon admission into the Order of Newfoundland and Labrador, usually in a ceremony held at Government House in St. John's, new Members are presented with the order's insignia. The main badge consists of a gold medallion in the form of a stylized sarracenia purpurea (or purple pitcher plant)—the official provincial flower—with the obverse in marbleized green enamel with gold edging, and bearing at its centre the escutcheon of the arms of Newfoundland and Labrador, all surmounted by a St. Edward's Crown symbolizing the Canadian monarch's role as the fount of honour. The ribbon is patterned with vertical stripes in blue, green, white and gold; men wear the medallion suspended from this ribbon at the collar, while women carry theirs on a ribbon bow at the left chest. Members also receive a lapel pin that can be worn during less formal occasions.

== Inductees ==
The following are some notable appointees of the Order of Newfoundland and Labrador:

- Michael B. Adam ONL, gold medal Olympian, appointed 2006
- Edgar Albert Baird ONL, businessman, appointed 2004
- Tom Dawe ONL, writer, appointed 2012
- Donald B. Dingwell OC ONL FRS FRSC, scientist, appointed 2021
- Jane Green, geneticist, appointed 2013
- Gary Graham ONL, musician, appointed 2004
- Bradley Raymond Gushue ONL, gold medal Olympian, appointed 2006
- Russell W. Howard ONL, gold medal Olympian, appointed 2006
- Paul Jolliffe Johnson ONL, businessman and philanthropist, appointed 2004
- Jamie A. Korab ONL, gold medal Olympian, appointed 2006
- Joanne McDonald OC ONL, wheelchair sport athlete, appointed 2008
- Hazel Newhook, politician, appointed 2009
- Mark Nichols ONL, gold medal Olympian, appointed 2006
- Paul O'Neill OC ONL, author and producer, appointed 2007
- Kaetlyn Osmond ONL, Olympic and World Champion figure skater, appointed 2019.
- Lanier W. Phillips, (honorary) for his work opposing discrimination and oppression, appointed 2011. (In 1942 local residents rescued Lanier from a shipwreck on the Newfoundland coast.)
- Christopher Pratt CC ONL, artist, appointed 2018
- Philip Riteman ONL, an Auschwitz survivor, appointed 2016
- Edward Moxon Roberts CM ONL QC, former Lieutenant Governor of Newfoundland and Labrador, appointed 2004
- Geoff Stirling, businessman, appointed 2009
- James A. Tuck ONL FRSC, archaeologist, appointed 2004
- Otto Tucker CM ONL, cultural historian, appointed 2004
- Clyde Wells ONL, fifth Premier of Newfoundland and Labrador, appointed 2016
- Tom Cahill ONL, playwright, songwriter and television producer for CBC Television, appointed 2005

== See also ==
- Symbols of Newfoundland and Labrador
- Orders, decorations, and medals of the Canadian provinces
- Canadian honours order of wearing
