= Joan Marie Aylward =

Lieutenant governor of Newfoundland and Labrador

Her Honour the Honourable Joan Marie Aylward ONL ECNL

15th Lieutenant Governor of Newfoundland and Labrador
- Incumbent
- Assumed office November 14, 2023
- Monarch: Charles III
- Governors General: Mary Simon; Louise Arbour
- Premier: Andrew Furey; John Hogan; Tony Wakeham
- Preceded by: Judy Foote

Member of the Newfoundland and Labrador House of Assembly for St. John's Centre
- In office February 22, 1996 – October 21, 2003
- Preceded by: Hubert Kitchen
- Succeeded by: Shawn Skinner

Personal details
- Born: 1956 (age 69–70)
- Party: Liberal
- Education: Memorial University

Joan Marie J. Aylward ONL ECNL (born 1956) is a Canadian dignitary and former politician serving as the 15th and current lieutenant governor of Newfoundland and Labrador. She previously sat in the Newfoundland and Labrador House of Assembly from 1996 to 2003 as a Liberal. She represented the electoral district of St. John's Centre.

Born in 1956, she was educated at the General Hospital School of Nursing, completing her nursing degree at Memorial University of Newfoundland. Aylward was an intensive care nurse at St. Clare's Mercy Hospital. From 1984 to 1990, she served on the faculty of the St. Clare's School of Nursing. Aylward served five years as president of the Newfoundland and Labrador Nurses Union.

She served in the Newfoundland cabinet as Minister of Social Services, as Minister of Health, as Minister of Municipal and Provincial Affairs, as Minister of Finance and as president of Treasury Board.

On October 12, 2023, Aylward was named by Prime Minister Justin Trudeau as the Lieutenant Governor of Newfoundland and Labrador, replacing Judy Foote. She was sworn in on November 14, 2023.

== Electoral record ==
2003 Newfoundland and Labrador general election
Party	Candidate	Votes	%	±%
Progressive Conservative	Shawn Skinner	3,349	55.19	+15.61
Liberal	Joan Marie Aylward	1,763	29.05	-13.22
New Democratic	Carol Cantwell	956	15.76	-2.39
Total valid votes		6,068	99.33	–
Total rejected ballots		41	0.67	–
Turnout		6,109	59.68	-0.57
Eligible voters		10,236		
Progressive Conservative gain from Liberal		Swing		+14.42
Source: Elections Newfoundland and Labrador

1999 Newfoundland and Labrador general election
Party	Candidate	Votes	%	±%
Liberal	Joan Marie Aylward	2,609	42.27	-0.78
Progressive Conservative	Paul Brown	2,443	39.58	+1.96
New Democratic	Valerie Long	1,120	18.15	-1.18
Total valid votes		6,172	99.29	–
Total rejected ballots		44	0.71	–
Turnout		6,216	60.25	-5.63
Eligible voters		10,317		
Liberal hold		Swing		-1.37
Source: Elections Newfoundland and Labrador

1996 Newfoundland and Labrador general election
Party	Candidate	Votes	%	±%
Liberal	Joan Marie Aylward	2,579	43.05	-4.20
Progressive Conservative	Paul Brown	2,254	37.62	-1.32
New Democratic	Wayne Lucas	1,158	19.33	+5.52
Total valid votes		5,991	99.42	–
Total rejected ballots		35	0.58	–
Turnout		6,026	65.88	-0.11
Eligible voters		9,147		
Liberal hold		Swing		-2.76
Source: Elections Newfoundland and Labrador

== Honours and decorations ==
Viceregal styles of Joan Marie Aylward (2023–present)
- Reference style: Her Honour the Honourable; Son Honneur l'honorable
- Spoken style: Your Honour; Votre Honneur

Ribbon Bar of Joan Marie Aylward

Ribbon	Description	Post-nominal letters	Notes
	Order of Newfoundland and Labrador	ONL	
	Queen Elizabeth II Golden Jubilee Medal		Canadian version
	King Charles III Coronation Medal		Canadian version

As lieutenant governor, Aylward is a ex officio Member (ONL) and Chancellor of the Order of Newfoundland and Labrador. As a lieutenant governor in Canada, Aylward is entitled to the style "the Honourable" for life and "Her Honour the Honourable" while in office.

Appointments

- November 14, 2023: Member of the Order of Newfoundland and Labrador (ONL)
  - November 14, 2023 – present: Chancellor of the Order of Newfoundland and Labrador (while in office)
- (Canada) November 14, 2023: Dame of Justice of the Most Venerable Order of the Hospital of Saint John of Jerusalem (Vice-Prior in Newfoundland and Labrador while in office)

Medals

- (Canada) February 6, 2002: Queen Elizabeth II Golden Jubilee Medal (Canadian version)
- (Canada) May 6, 2024: King Charles III Coronation Medal (Canadian version)

Honorary military appointments

- (Canada) November 14, 2023 – Present: Honorary Colonel of the Royal Newfoundland Regiment.
- (Canada) November 14, 2023 – Present: Patron of the Canadian Corps of Commissionaires (Newfoundland and Labrador Branch).
- (Newfoundland and Labrador) November 14, 2023 – Present: Honorary Chief of Police of the Royal Newfoundland Constabulary.

Order of precedence
Preceded by Salma Lakhani as Lieutenant Governor of Alberta	Order of Precedence of Canada as Lieutenant Governor of Newfoundland and Labrador	Succeeded by Alex Campbell as Member of the King's Privy Council
