= Shawn Skinner =

Canadian politician

The Honourable Shawn Skinner ECNL

Member of the Newfoundland and Labrador House of Assembly for St. John's Centre
- In office 2003–2011
- Preceded by: Joan Marie Aylward
- Succeeded by: Gerry Rogers

Minister of Natural Resources
- In office December 6, 2010 – October 28, 2011
- Preceded by: Kathy Dunderdale
- Succeeded by: Jerome Kennedy

Minister of Innovation, Trade, and Rural Development
- In office October 31, 2008 – December 6, 2010
- Preceded by: Trevor Taylor
- Succeeded by: Susan Sullivan

Minister of Human Resources, Labour, and Employment
- In office January 19, 2007 – October 31, 2008
- Preceded by: Paul Shelley
- Succeeded by: Susan Sullivan

Personal details
- Party: Progressive Conservative

Shawn Skinner is a Canadian politician in Newfoundland and Labrador, Canada. Skinner is a former St. John's City Councillor (1993-1997; 2020-2021) and former Member of the House of Assembly (MHA) for the district of St. John's Centre. He served as a MHA from 2003 to 2011 and was a minister in the cabinets of Danny Williams and Kathy Dunderdale. He is currently the training director for the Carpenter Millwright College (United Brotherhood of Carpenters and Joiners of America).

== Early career ==
Skinner was born and raised in St. John's, Newfoundland and Labrador. He studied at Memorial University of Newfoundland (MUN) before earning a diploma in applied arts from Cabot College and a Certificate in Adult Education from St. Francis Xavier University. In 1998, he became a member of the Canadian Institute of Management, from which he was granted the Professional Manager designation. For 20 years Skinner operated Keyin Technical College in St. John's, a private college specializing in business, information technology and health-related fields. From 1993 to 1997 he served as ward two councillor on St. John's City Council.

== Provincial politics ==
In November 2002, Skinner lost the Progressive Conservative Party (PC Party) nomination in St. John's Centre to Paul Brown, who had been the party's candidate in the previous two elections. However, Brown resigned as the party's candidate the following year and Skinner won the nomination for the district in August 2003. In the October 2003 election, Skinner easily defeated Minister of Finance Joan Marie Aylward, winning 55% of the popular vote. In 2006, Skinner was appointed Parliamentary Assistant to Premier Danny Williams.

=== Minister of Human Resources, Labour and Employment ===
On January 19, 2007, Skinner was appointed Minister of Human Resources, Labour and Employment and the Minister responsible for Newfoundland and Labrador Housing. His appointment came after Paul Shelley, the department's former minister, announced he would not be seeking re-election in the October election. In August 2007, Skinner said he planned to bring forth legislation to protect jobs of reservists who leave work for military duty. Skinner's announcement was in response to Major Wallace Noseworthy, who called for the legislation after he was forced to quit his job in order to serve in Afghanistan. Noseworthy's employer would not grant him a leave of absence to serve. In April 2008, the government brought forth changes to The Labour Standards Act to provide for unpaid leave for reservists.

In the October 9, 2007, general election Skinner was re-elected, winning 76% of the popular vote. Weeks later his ministerial portfolio was added to when he became Minister Responsible for Persons with Disabilities and Minister Responsible for the Labour Relations Agency.

=== Minister of Innovation, Trade and Rural Development ===
On October 31, 2008, Skinner was appointed Minister of Innovation, Trade and Rural Development.

=== Minister of Natural Resources ===
On December 3, 2010, Kathy Dunderdale succeeded Williams as Premier of Newfoundland and Labrador. The following week Dunderdale appointed Skinner as Minister of Natural Resources, her former portfolio. His appointment came on the heels of the government signing a partnership agreement to develop a multi-billion dollar hydro development at Muskrat Falls in Labrador.

Despite easily winning his seat in 2003 and 2007, Skinner's St. John's Centre district was seen as being in play in the 2011 election. In the months leading up to the provincial election, support for the New Democratic Party had surged; the NDP were running businesswoman and filmmaker Gerry Rogers against Skinner. Skinner received support late in the campaign from St. John's Mayor Dennis O'Keefe, which was seen as an indication that Skinner was in risk of losing his seat. Despite the Progressive Conservative government easily being re-elected, Skinner went down to defeat on election night.

=== 2014 leadership ===
Following the resignation of Dunderdale as Premier of Newfoundland and Labrador and leader of the Progressive Conservative Party, Skinner's name was brought up as a potential successor. In February 2014, in an interview with The Telegram Skinner said “I don’t mind sharing with you that I’m very, very seriously considering this.” Skinner's major issue with regards to entering the race was the spending limit for candidates. Under the party constitution leadership candidates cannot spend over $200,000, but the party was looking at revising that amount upward. Skinner was worried about racking up debt if he lost the race, but felt he could raise $200,000.

== Later life ==
Skinner served as chair of End Homelessness St. John’s between 2012 and 2018. In 2015, Skinner served on the Electoral Boundaries Commission charged with reducing the number of seats from 48 to 40. He is currently the senior director, business development for Aecon Construction Group Limited. Skinner co-chaired the provincial PC Party's 2018 leadership convention. In 2020, Skinner announced his candidacy for the Ward 2 municipal by-election in St. John's.

In 2020, Skinner was elected to the St. John's City Council. He won 22.8% of the vote and defeated seven other candidates. He did not run for re-election in 2021.

== Electoral results ==
Ward 2 by-election, 2020
Candidate	Vote	%
Shawn Skinner	1,242	22.88
Ophelia Ravencroft	936	17.24
Lorne Loder	923	17.00
Greg Smith	586	10.79
Carol Anne Furlong	570	10.50
Matt House	480	8.84
Greg Noseworthy	470	8.66
Wallace Ryan	222	4.09

2011 Newfoundland and Labrador general election
Party	Candidate	Votes	%	±%
NDP	Gerry Rogers	2,569	54.44%	
Progressive Conservative	Shawn Skinner	2,041	43.25%	–
Liberal	Carly Bigelow	109	2.31%	

2007 Newfoundland and Labrador general election
Party	Candidate	Votes	%	±%
Progressive Conservative	Shawn Skinner	3332	76.49%	–
NDP	Jane Robinson	650	14.92%	
Liberal	Lori Ann Campbell-Martino	374	8.59%	

2003 Newfoundland and Labrador general election
Party	Candidate	Votes	%	±%
Progressive Conservative	Shawn Skinner	3349	54.82	–
Liberal	Joan Marie Aylward	1763	28.85	
NDP	Carol Cantwell	956	15.65	
