= Gemma Hickey =

Canadian LGBTQ2 rights activist and author

- Born: October 1, 1976 (age 49); St. John's, Newfoundland and Labrador, Canada
- Other name: Gemma Schlamp-Hickey
- Education: Memorial University of Newfoundland
- Occupations: LGBT rights activist, author
- Political party: Liberal (2021-); New Democratic Party (2007-2021)
- Awards: Queen Elizabeth II Diamond Jubilee Medal (2012); Newfoundland and Labrador Human Rights Champion (2016)

Gemma Hickey (born October 1, 1976) is a Canadian LGBTQ rights activist and author. They became one of the first Canadians to receive a gender-neutral birth certificate and passport. Hickey founded The Pathways Foundation, an organization that offers support to survivors of religious institutional abuse and their families. Since 2010, Hickey has worked as Executive Director of Artforce, formerly known as For the Love of Learning, a non-profit that works to forge new paths for at-risk youth by advancing their literacy and creative skills.

== Background ==
Gemma Hickey was born in St. John's, Newfoundland and Labrador, on October 1, 1976. They attended Gonzaga High School, graduating in 1994. In 2003, Hickey graduated with a Bachelor of Arts in Religious Studies from Memorial University of Newfoundland. During their time at post-secondary, they served as General Director of LBGT-MUN (now Sexual and Gender Advocacy).

Hickey was raised Roman Catholic; however, they left the Catholic Church in 2003 to become a member of the Wesley United Church of Canada congregation.

Hickey is non-binary, and uses the pronouns they and them. Hickey's transition is the subject of the 2017 documentary film Just Be Gemma. The documentary aired on CBC Television and the Documentary Channel, as well as being screened at the Nickel Film Festival in St. John's, the Atlantic Film Festival in Halifax, and at the Canadian Embassy in Tokyo, Japan.

Gemma Hickey's first book, Almost Feral, a memoir chronicling their walk across Newfoundland and the emotional terrain traveled was published in October 2019 by Breakwater Books. In 2020, the book won two awards at the Atlantic Book Awards: the APMA Best Atlantic Published Book Award, and the Margaret and John Savage First Book Award in the non-fiction category. Hickey was one of 24 Canadian writers to be featured on CBC Books’ Writers to Watch list, and CBC Books named Almost Feral as one of 40 Canadian books on the summer 2020 reading list.

In June 2019, Hickey married Rebecca Rose, the president of Breakwater Books. They later separated. Hickey was previously married once before.

== Activism ==
Gemma Hickey has spent years campaigning for LGBTQ rights in Canada, through their involvement in Egale Canada, PFLAG Canada, and Canadians for Equal Marriage. In 2003, Hickey traveled to Halifax to present a brief on same-sex marriage to the Canadian House of Commons Standing Committee on Justice and Human Rights. Hickey was president of Egale Canada in 2005, when same-sex marriage in Canada was legalized.

Hickey is outspoken about the trauma of sexual abuse by clergy. After going public about being sexually abused at the hands of a Roman Catholic priest, Hickey founded The Pathways Foundation in 2013, a non-profit organization that helps people deal with the effects of such abuse. Hickey continues to raise the issue publicly, including attending the February 2019 Vatican sexual abuse summit in Rome.

On June 2, 2015, a private member's bill was tabled in the House of Commons in Ottawa that Hickey had helped draft, to make June 1 the National Institutional Abuse Awareness Day.

In 2015, Hickey undertook a 908-kilometer walk across the island of Newfoundland to raise awareness and funds for survivors of clergy abuse. Hickey completed the month-long walk at the Mount Cashel Orphanage Memorial in St. John's, the site of the largest sexual abuse scandal in Canadian history.

=== Non-binary official documents ===
Canada introduced non-binary passports in August 2017, becoming the first country in the Americas to allow its citizens to use 'X' in the gender category. Hickey applied and received one of the first issued, and used the passport to travel to Germany and visit a memorial to gay people persecuted by the Nazis. Hickey then traveled to Japan to speak about LGBTQ issues, to attend a screening of the documentary film Just Be Gemma, and to give a reading from their memoir, Almost Feral.

On December 14, 2017, Hickey became the first person in Newfoundland and Labrador, and one of the first in Canada, to receive a non-binary birth certificate. Their application was initially rejected because the Vital Statistics Act limited gender designation on the application form to male and female only. In response to the rejection, Hickey filed an application at the Supreme Court of Newfoundland and Labrador to challenge the constitutionality of the law. The province changed the legislation before the court proceedings concluded. The space for 'gender' on Hickey's birth certificate is marked with 'X' instead of a 'M' or 'F'.

== Politics ==
Hickey unsuccessfully ran as a New Democrat for a seat in the Newfoundland and Labrador House of Assembly in the riding of Kilbride in a by-election called for February 8, 2007 following the resignation of Ed Byrne. They again unsuccessfully sought election to the provincial House of Assembly, this time in the Electoral District of St. John's East, in a general election held October 9, 2007.

In January 2021, Hickey was confirmed as the Liberal candidate in St. John's Centre for the 2021 provincial election. Hickey was defeated by incumbent NDP MHA Jim Dinn.

On July 10, 2025, Hickey was confirmed as the Liberal Party candidate in St. John's Centre; Hickey was again defeated by Dinn.

== Honours and awards ==
In 2012, Hickey was recognized with a Queen Elizabeth II Diamond Jubilee Medal for their contribution to LGBTQ rights in Canada.

In 2016, Hickey was named a Newfoundland and Labrador Human Rights Champion for their longstanding commitment to human rights protection, particularly for LGBTQ people.

== Bibliography ==
| Year | Title | Publisher | ISBN | Pages | Note |
|---|---|---|---|---|---|
| 2019 | Almost Feral | Breakwater Books | 9781550817775 | 216 | Hickey's memoir. |

== Electoral results ==
2025 Newfoundland and Labrador general election: St. John's Centre
| Party | Candidate | Votes | % | ±% |
|---|---|---|---|---|
| New Democratic | Jim Dinn | 2,398 | 62.16 | +9.78 |
| Liberal | Gemma Hickey | 1,003 | 26.00 | -7.60 |
| Progressive Conservative | Ben Duggan | 457 | 11.85 | -2.18 |
| Total valid votes | | 3,858 | 99.4 | |
| Total rejected ballots | | 23 | 0.05 | |
| Turnout | | 3,881 | 38.45 | |
| Eligible voters | | 9,836 | | |
| New Democratic hold | | Swing | | +8.69 |

2021 Newfoundland and Labrador general election: St. John's Centre
| Party | Candidate | Votes | % | ±% |
|---|---|---|---|---|
| New Democratic | Jim Dinn | 1,991 | 52.38 | +5.45 |
| Liberal | Gemma Hickey | 1,277 | 33.60 | +8.06 |
| Progressive Conservative | Robyn LeGrow | 533 | 14.02 | -13.51 |
| Total valid votes | | 3,801 | 99.01 | |
| Total rejected ballots | | 38 | 0.99 | |
| Turnout | | 3,839 | 38.92 | |
| Eligible voters | | 9,864 | | |
| New Democratic hold | | Swing | | -1.30 |
Source(s) "Officially Nominated Candidates General Election 2021" (PDF). Elections Newfoundland and Labrador. "NL Election 2021 (Unofficial Results)".

2007 Newfoundland and Labrador general election
| Party | Candidate | Votes | % | ±% |
|---|---|---|---|---|
| Progressive Conservative | Ed Buckingham | 3,649 | 70.11 | – |
| NDP | Gemma Schlamp-Hickey | 864 | 16.60 | |
| Liberal | Peter Adams | 692 | 13.29 | |

By-Election: February 8, 2007 on the resignation of Ed Byrne
| Party | Candidate | Votes | % | ±% |
|---|---|---|---|---|
| Progressive Conservative | John Dinn | 2,744 | 78.83 | +0.55 |
| Liberal | Bob Clarke | 508 | 14.59 | -1.18 |
| NDP | Gemma Schlamp-Hickey | 229 | 6.58 | +0.63 |
| Total | | 3,481 | 100% | |
