= MakeBelieve Arts =

MakeBelieve Arts is a theatre in education charity, based in Corsham, Wiltshire. The company works with children aged 2–7 and their teachers, families and community. It uses theatre approaches within education to deliver creative, interactive workshops that seek to reflect, support and enhance the curriculum and to encourage lifelong learning. MakeBelieve Arts' approach is underpinned by current educational philosophy.

MakeBelieve Arts pioneered the Helicopter Stories approach in the UK. This approach is based on the work of Vivian Gussin Paley who until her death in 2019 was patron to MakeBelieve Arts. In its simplest form Helicopter Stories involves practitioners in scribing stories dictated by children in the Early Years. These stories are then acted out around a taped out stage. In 2016, Trisha Lee published a guide on the approach. Princesses, Dragons and Helicopter Stories

Helicopter Stories is a registered trademark of MakeBelieve Arts.

== History ==
MakeBelieve Arts was founded by Trisha Lee in 2002. The programmes in schools and the community are delivered by Trisha Lee as Artistic Director and Isla Hill as Education Director, alongside a pool of creative associates and consultants, including the author David Baird.

== Educational philosophy ==
MakeBelieve Arts is guided by thinking such as that of the British educationalist Sir Ken Robinson, who has written that '...creativity is as important to education as literacy, and we should treat it with the same status.' The company has embedded this philosophy into all its work.

The group considers that a creative approach to education allows children and young people to develop into enterprising adults with more job prospects in the future. Trisha Lee stated in The Times that:

We aim to give the children life-long skills. The capacity to analyse, discuss and communicate. It is recognised that creativity is really important for employers in the 21st century. Once they have acquired the skills to ask questions and think outside of the box then they can do anything.

== Social enterprise ==
MakeBelieve Arts is a social enterprise; it is not core funded and derives funds from a variety of sources. Any profits are reinvested into the company.

Trisha Lee (founder and Artistic Director) was a Cabinet-appointed Social Enterprise Ambassador from mid-2007 to mid-2010. With 28 other leading social entrepreneurs in the country, Trisha Lee sought to raise awareness about social enterprise and encourage other arts organisations to think creatively and become social enterprises.
