= Sound Team =

American band

- Origin: Austin, Texas, U.S.
- Genres: Indie rock
- Years active: 2000–2007
- Labels: Big Orange; Cult Hero; St. Ives; Capitol Records; Parlophone
- Past members: Matt Oliver; Bill Baird; Jordan R. Johns; Sam Sanford; Michael Baird; Gabe Pearlman also: Will Patterson; Willis Deviney
- Website: Sound Team on MySpace

Sound Team was an American band based in Austin, Texas, that formed in 2000 around principal songwriters Bill Baird and Matt Oliver. For most of their recording career, Sound Team consisted of Bill Baird (bass, guitar, vocals), Matt Oliver (guitar, piano, vocals), Jordan Johns (drums, percussion), Sam Sanford (guitar), Michael Baird (synthesizer, tapes) and Gabe Pearlman (organ). Sanford and Michael Baird left the group in 2006. The band continued to record and tour briefly with a new line-up, but finally disbanded in late 2007.

== Formation and early shows ==
Bill Baird and Matt Oliver met in Austin in 2000 and began recording crazy songs on cheap gear that drew inspiration out of everything from traditional American folk and pop song forms to German synthesizer music. They released two CD-R albums, Sound Team and Into the Lens.

== Line-up solidified, early releases and tours ==
In 2002 Baird's younger brother Michael, Michael’s friend Jordan Johns (both of whom were still in high school at the time), and old friend Sam Sanford all enlisted, and after they had played a handful of shows in various performance spaces and punk dives, Gabe Pearlman joined in early 2003.

The group released two cassettes, Every Day Is a New Year and the "Yes" Special Cassette, and their audience continued to grow. After touring throughout 2003 and 2004, the group continued to work dead-end jobs, pooled their cash, and converted an abandoned record-pressing plant into a makeshift analog recording studio. The result was the Marathon LP, which appeared on the St. Ives label, a vinyl-only imprint of Indiana's Secretly Canadian. In the fall of 2005, several songs from previous cassette and vinyl releases appeared on the WORK EP.

== Contract with EMI and break-up ==
In 2005, the band was signed to a contract with Capitol Records. Support slots on several tours culminated with an appearance in Central Park opening for Arcade Fire. In June 2006, Capitol released the band's debut album, Movie Monster. Although the album was met with generally positive reviews, commercial sales were poor. Another factor negatively affecting sales of the album was that, unbeknownst to the band, Capitol set the album's list price at an astronomical $18.98. After extensive touring in support of the album, both Sam Sanford and the younger Baird left the band for other pursuits (oil painting and a college degree, respectively). Will Patterson was enlisted as a replacement. In 2007, after a massive shake-up at Capitol in which the band's A&R rep and the president of the company (who'd signed the band) was fired, Sound Team was dropped from the EMI label. Sound Team released a vinyl EP, Empty Rooms/Bedroom Walls/Up from Ashes, and shot a Take-Away Show acoustic video for La Blogotheque that year, but internal friction in the group led to its decision to break up, and on September 15, 2007, Sound Team played its last show at the 2007 Austin City Limits Music Festival. Subsequently, the band released its entire recorded catalog as high-quality MP3 downloads, completely free of charge, on its Web site (now inactive).

== Post break-up ==
Bill Baird began performing under the moniker Sunset as early as 2006, and performances frequently include former Sound Team members Sam Sanford and Will Patterson (Sleep Good). Sunset lasted until 2010, after which Baird began releasing solo albums. Meanwhile, Matt Oliver and Jordan Johns continued to operate the analog recording studio at Big Orange Recording, and began performing as TV Torso in 2009.

== Discography ==
=== Albums ===
- Sound Team (2002)
  - CD-R release
- Into the Lens (2002)
  - CD-R release
  1. "Don't Imbibe the TV"
  2. "Glad Tidings"
  3. "Out of Control"
  4. "Faraway"
  5. "Beef Captain"
  6. "Angler Fish's Bulb"
  7. "Talk to the Ocean (I Can't Find the Words)"
  8. "Free"
  9. "Everything Is Possible"
  10. "Life Is RAD (Just Say Yes)"
  11. "The Lens Stares Back"
  12. "Beef Captain" (Reprise)
  13. "Floating Around"
  14. "Cold Blooded Woman of Sin"
  15. "LaMonte Young"
  16. "SK5"
  17. "Everything Is Possible" (Reprise)
  18. "Darkness Falls"
  19. "Faraway" (Reprise)
  20. "Life Is SAD (Moog Fugue)"
  21. "But Don't Cry" ("Angler Fish's Bulb" Reprise)
  22. "The TV Imbibed ME"
- "Yes" Special Cassette (2003)
  - Cassette release
  1. "Color of the Love You Have"
  2. "Vermont"
  3. "Journey of 1,000 Steps"
  4. "Electric Stallion"
  5. "Your Eyes Are Liars"
- Every Day Is a New Year (2003)
  - Cassette release
  1. "Feeling of Wonder"
  2. "Tina Timex"
  3. "Don't Turn Away"
  4. "It's Obvious What's Happening Here"
  5. "Big Orange"
- Marathon (2005)
  - St. Ives Records SAINT11 (vinyl LP only)
  1. "The Fastest Man Alive"
  2. "Your Eyes Are Liars"
  3. "Orange Bird"
  4. "In the Dark No One Can Hear You Sweat"
  5. "Back in Town"
  6. "Shattered Glass"
  7. "Afterglow Years
  8. "Don't Turn Away"
- "Movie Monster" (June 6, 2006 - USA; September 25, 2006 - UK)
  - Capitol Records 7243 8 60594 2 0 (USA); Parlophone Records 0946 3 63155 2 2 (UK)
  1. "Get Out"
  2. "Born to Please"
  3. "No More Birthdays"
  4. ""Movie Monster""
  5. "TV Torso"
  6. "Back in Town"
  7. "Your Eyes Are Liars"
  8. "Afterglow Years"
  9. "Shattered Glass"
  10. "You've Never Lived a Day"
  11. "Handful of Billions"

=== EPs ===
- WORK EP (December 27, 2005 - USA; June 12, 2006 - UK)
  - Capitol Records 0946 3 31417 2 8 (USA); Parlophone TEAM 002 (UK)
  - "Don't Turn Away" is not featured on the UK pressing
  1. "The Fastest Man Alive"
  2. "It's Obvious What's Happening Here"
  3. "Orange Bird"
  4. "In the Dark No One Can Hear You Sweat"
  5. "Don't Turn Away"
- Empty Rooms/Bedroom Walls/Up from Ashes (August 7, 2007)
  - Big Orange Records (vinyl only)
  1. "Empty Rooms"
  2. "Bedroom Walls"
  3. "Up from Ashes"

=== Singles ===
- "Born to Please" (September 18, 2006 - UK)
  - CD (Parlophone CDCL 877):
  1. "Born to Please"
  2. "No More Birthdays" (Phil Spector Folk)/"San Francisco Bay, Early Morning, 1849"
  3. ""Movie Monster"" (Wide Open Space of Big Orange Version)
  - Red-colored 7" vinyl (Parlophone CL 877):
  1. "Born to Please"
  2. "Feeling of Wonder"

== See also ==
- Music of Austin
