= Gary Graham (musician) =

Canadian musician

Gary Graham ONL
- Born: August 11, 1945; Wolfville, Nova Scotia
- Died: June 24, 2019 (aged 73) Corner Brook, Newfoundland and Labrador
- Genres: Classical
- Occupations: Organist, pianist, choral conductor, church musician, music teacher, music director
- Instruments: Piano, pipe organ

Gary Graham (11 August 1945 – 24 June 2019) ONL, was a Canadian musician born in Wolfville, Nova Scotia. His early musical education began at the Banff Centre while still a teenager and continued at the Music School of Acadia University in Wolfville, Nova Scotia; he later studied at McGill University in Montreal.

A long-time resident of Corner Brook, Newfoundland, Graham was the founding musical director of Theatre Newfoundland and Labrador. He directed several dozen musical theatre productions over the years. Graham worked as the musical director of the Stephenville festival during its heyday under the direction of Maxim Mazumdar, directing professional casts at home in Newfoundland and on national and international tours.

Graham devoted most of his adult life to the success of the careers of hundreds of amateur performers. As a choral director, Graham was well decorated. His choirs received prizes at the regional, provincial, national and international levels. He toured his choirs across both sides of the Atlantic, receiving some of the highest honours available to amateur choral groups. As a teacher of performance, Graham's students have established thriving careers at the highest levels in Canada, the U.S. and Europe. Graham was invested as a member of the Order of Newfoundland and Labrador in 2004 for his role in the development of the musical, cultural and artistic life on the West Coast of the province.

Graham died on June 24, 2019, aged 73.

== Honours ==
Appointments

- 2004: Order of Newfoundland and Labrador (ONL)

Medals

- (Canada) 2012: Queen Elizabeth II Diamond Jubilee Medal

Honorary degrees

- (Newfoundland and Labrador) 2013: Memorial University of Newfoundland, Doctor of Laws (LLD)
