= May Baird =

Scottish doctor and social pioneer

May Baird CBE
- Born: Matilda Deans Tennent; 14 January 1901; Larkhall, Scotland
- Died: 16 August 1983 (aged 82)
- Education: University of Glasgow
- Occupations: physician, town councillor
- Relatives: Sir Dugald Baird; 2 daughters, 2 sons

Matilda Deans "May" Baird, CBE (née Tennent; 14 May 1901 – 16 August 1983) was a Scottish doctor and social pioneer. She was a town councillor in Aberdeen, established the first free family planning there and later was the first woman to hold the position of Chair of a regional hospital board. She was National Governor of the BBC from 1965 to 1971.

== Early life and education ==
Baird was born in Larkhall on 14 May 1901. She was educated at a local school before going on to the Glasgow High School for Girls. She studied science and medicine at the University of Glasgow, graduating with a BSc in 1922 and an MBChB in 1924.

== Career ==
After leaving university Baird worked as a junior doctor in Glasgow hospitals. In 1928, she married Dugald Baird, a gynaecologist and obstetrician. She and her husband moved to Aberdeen in 1936 when he took up the position of Regius Professor of Midwifery.

Her desire to reduce the hardships experienced by the poor and neglected led her being drawn into public life, and in 1938 she was elected as a Labour Party councillor for Aberdeen Town Council. From 1938 to 1954 she was Chair of the Council's Public Health Committee. She established the first free family planning clinic in the city. In 1947, she was appointed as the first female Chair of the North Eastern Regional Hospital Board, with which she served until 1960.

In 1951, she served as a member of the Royal Commission on the law of marriage and divorce.

She was the BBC's National Governor for Scotland 1965−1971.

She was a member of the Maternity Services Review Committee of the Department of Health.

== Personal life ==
She had two daughters and two sons. Her daughter Joyce Baird worked as a doctor specialising in diabetes at the Western General Hospital in Edinburgh. Her son, Professor David Tennent Baird is Emeritus, and Senior Professorial Research Fellow at Medical Research Council Centre for Reproductive Health and Obstetrics and Gynaecology, University of Edinburgh.

== Death and legacy ==
Baird died on 16 August 1983.

The Baird Family Hospital due to open in Aberdeen in 2024 is named for her, her husband, their daughter Joyce and son David, in recognition of the medical contributions they have made in Scotland and to the profession. The hospital will offer maternity, gynaecology, breast screening and breast surgery services, as well as a neonatal unit, a centre for reproductive medicine, an operating theatre suite and teaching facilities.

== Awards and honours ==
In 1960, Baird received an honorary LLD from the University of Aberdeen.

She received Commander of the Most Excellent Order of the British Empire (CBE) in the Queen's Birthday Honours 1962.

In 1966, she and her husband were both awarded Freedom of the City of Aberdeen. An Aberdeen street was named in her honour. She and her husband are commemorated by a plaque at 38 Albyn Place, their home.
