= Paul O'Neill (author) =

Canadian historian (1921–2013)

Paul O'Neill OC ONL
- Born: Paul O'Neill; October 1928; St. John's, Dominion of Newfoundland
- Died: August 12, 2013 (aged 92)
- Education: St. Bonaventure's College; National Academy of Theater Arts
- Occupations: Writer, historian, producer

Paul O'Neill OC ONL (October 1928 – August 12, 2013) was a writer, historian and former CBC producer. He wrote many books on the history of Newfoundland. O'Neill was born in St. John's, Newfoundland, and raised in Bay de Verde until the age of 8 when his family moved to St. John's.

Educated at St. Bonaventure's College in St. John's, National Academy of Theater Arts at New York City, O'Neill was an aspiring actor in the United States and England from 1949 to 1952. Having performed on stage with such stars as Eddie Albert, Larine Day and Cloris Leachman in the United States and in England he acted in films with such well-known actors as Richard Attenborough, Thora Hird and Elizabeth Taylor. While he was in England broadcaster Margot Davies had helped him in radio and encouraged him to write

O'Neill began his career in radio in 1953 with the CBC in Newfoundland where he produced many radio shows, TV shows such as Reach for the Top and was responsible for school broadcasts for 25 years. He retired from the CBC in 1986. O'Neill wrote stage and radio plays, articles, poems and stories in addition to works of popular history. He has served as president of the Newfoundland Writer's Guild, chairman of the Newfoundland and Labrador Arts Council and president of the St. John's Folk Arts Council. In 1988, O'Neill was awarded an honorary LL.D by Memorial University of Newfoundland and in 1990, he was appointed to the Order of Canada. In 2004, O'Neill was awarded the Freedom of the City and in 2008, he received Order of Newfoundland and Labrador. O'Neill left to his niece, Irene O'Neil of Boston, Massachusetts, all copyrights to existing publications and future publications. Paul O'Neill wrote his memoirs during the last years of his life, however fell ill before publication. His memoirs will be published in August 2015 on the 2nd anniversary of his death. The book is titled Something of Me. He died in August 2013 at the age of 84.

== Selected bibliography ==
- Spindrift and Morning Light an Anthology of Poems, Valhalla Press (1968)
- Everyman's Complete St. John's Guide, Valhalla Press (1974)
- Legends of a Lost Tribe folk tales of the Beothuck Indians of Newfoundland, McClellan and Stewart (1976)
- A Seaport Legacy the story of St. John's, Newfoundland, Press Porcepic (1976)
- Breakers stories from Newfoundland and Labrador, Breakwater Books (1982)
- The Seat Imperial Bay Bulls Past and Present, Harry Cuff Publications (1983)
- A Sound of Seagulls: the Poetry of Paul O'Neill, Creative Printers and Publishers Limited (1984)
- Upon this Rock the Story of the Roman Catholic Church in Newfoundland and Labrador, Breakwater Books (1984)
- The Oldest City The Story of St. John's, Newfoundland, Boulder Publications (2003) ISBN 0-9730271-2-6
- No Need To Wear Rubbers Travel Diary of James O'Neil, Boulder Publications (2005) ISBN 0-9738501-1-6
- How Dog Became a Friend Picture book illustrated by Cynthia Colosimo, Flanker Press (2007) ISBN 978-1-894463-93-5

== See also ==
- List of people of Newfoundland and Labrador
- List of communities in Newfoundland and Labrador
