= Philip Riteman =

Polish Auschwitz survivor (1922–2018)

Philip Riteman ONS ONL
- Born: February 14, 1922; Poland
- Died: August 8, 2018 (aged 96); Halifax, Nova Scotia, Canada

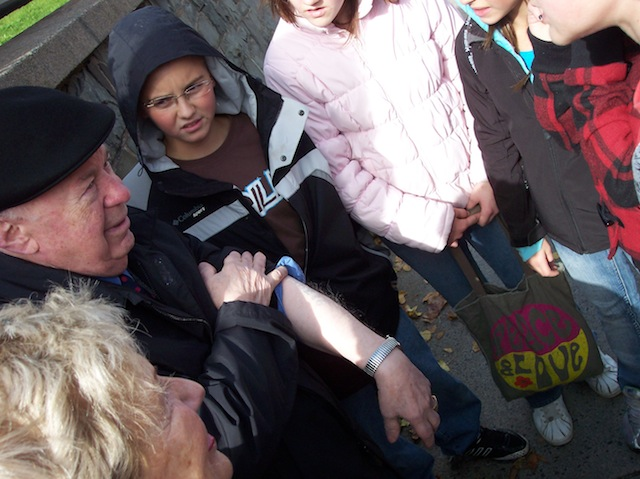
Riteman speaking with students in 2008

Philip Riteman ONS ONL (February 14, 1922 – August 8, 2018) was a Polish Auschwitz survivor who, in 1989, after forty years of silence, lectured on his experiences in public and private schools, community centres and universities in North America. In 2010 he published a book on his life titled Millions of Souls: The Philip Riteman Story. Philip had recently visited Astral Drive Junior High School for the third time (first being 2002/2003, second being 2010), Gaetz Brook Junior High in Eastern Shore (2009–2010), Father Mercredi Highschool and Westwood High School, in Fort McMurray, May 5, 2011 and Woodlawn High School, in Dartmouth, November 7, 2011. He also visited Gorsebrook Junior High School in the early 1990s.

Riteman was fourteen years of age when he and his family were captured along with other Jews from his home in Szereszow. Because of his large build, he was able to pass as an eighteen-year-old, saving his life. He performed hard labor for the Nazis from 1939 until May 2, 1945. He also spent some time in the Krakow Volunteer Fire Department. His personal identification number was 98706. Later he became a book salesman.

== Life at Auschwitz ==
At the time of his selection, Riteman lied and told the Nazi guard that he was, in fact eighteen years old, and a fellow prisoner told the guard that he was a locksmith, ultimately saving his life. The Nazis had need of individuals between eighteen years and forty five years that had any practical skill. In fact, he was only fourteen and had no such profession. He later worked as a general laborer around Auschwitz and other various Nazi concentration camps. Eventually, he and many others were moved up a nearby mountain for the purpose of the Nazis' defense (the Americans had reached the area by this time and were fighting for liberation). After several months, he and his fellow prisoners awoke only to silence, and a lack of German soldiers (May 2, 1945). Looking down and away from the mountain, they saw the Americans coming to their aid. The U.S. soldiers eventually had to leave the prisoners (who were now liberated) and pursue the Nazis. However, returning to the camps, they received food, appropriate shelter, and medical attention from the American Army, who had conquered the area. Riteman lost his entire immediate family to the Nazis, which included his parents, 5 brothers, and 2 sisters.

== After liberation ==
After he was liberated, and while still in the camp, Riteman received multiple letters from three aunts: two were his mother's sisters, one living in Newfoundland and one living in Montreal, Quebec, Canada, and one aunt was his father's youngest sister, living in Brooklyn, New York. At the time, Riteman was completely unaware that they existed, and was sure that the letters were false, mean jokes. However, the aunts had already been in contact with each other and agreed that Philip should settle in Newfoundland, which did not prohibit Jewish immigration as Canada did. (Newfoundland did not join the Canadian Confederation until 1949.)

Riteman arrived in Newfoundland in August 1946 and, even though he did not initially speak English, he was able to establish a successful business selling clothing articles door to door. He resided in Newfoundland until 1980 when he moved to Nova Scotia.

== Death ==
Riteman died in his sleep on August 8, 2018, at the age of 96.
