= Anne Cooke =

British biologist

Anne Cooke FMedSci FRSB
- Born: Anne Syme; 14 January 1945 (age 81); South Shields, England
- Citizenship: United Kingdom
- Education: University of Glasgow; University of Sussex
- Spouse: Jonathan Cooke (m. 1969)
- Children: 2
- Scientific career
- Fields: Immunology; Autoimmune diseases
- Workplaces: University College London; University of Cambridge; King's College, Cambridge; University of Washington
- Thesis: Characterisation of immunoglobulin synthesised by lymphoid tissue in vitro (1970)

Anne Cooke (née Syme; born 14 November 1945) is a British biologist and academic, specialising in immunology and autoimmune diseases. From 2000 to 2013, she was Professor of Immunobiology at the University of Cambridge. She was a fellow of King's College, Cambridge, between 1992 and 2013.

== Early life ==
Cooke was born on 14 November 1945 in South Shields, England, to William and Margaret Syme. She studied biochemistry at the University of Glasgow and graduated with a Bachelor of Science (BSc) degree in 1967. She then undertook postgraduate research in biochemistry and immunology at the University of Sussex. She completed her Doctor of Philosophy (DPhil) degree in 1970. Her doctoral thesis was titled Characterisation of immunoglobulin synthesised by lymphoid tissue in vitro.

== Academic career ==
Cooke began her academic career as a postdoctoral fellow. From 1970 to 1972, she held a SRC postdoctoral fellowship in the Department of Biochemistry at the University of Sussex. From 1972 to 1973, she was a postdoctoral fellow at the University of Illinois and worked at the Medical Center, Chicago, USA. From 1973 to 1978, she held an Arthritis Research UK postdoctoral research fellowship in the Immunology Department of Middlesex Hospital. Then from 1978 to 1981, while remaining at Middlesex Hospital, she was a Wellcome Trust senior research fellow.

In 1981, Cooke moved from research into teaching and research. From 1981 to 1988, she was a Wellcome Trust senior lecturer within the immunology division of the UCL Medical School and also at the Middlesex Hospital Medical School. During this time she collaborated with Joyce Baird, diabetologist at Edinburgh's Western General Hospital. From 1988 to 1990, she was Reader in Experimental Immunology at University College London.

In 1990, Cooke moved to the University of Cambridge. From 1990 to 1996, she was a lecturer in the Department of Pathology. In 1992, she was elected a fellow of King's College, Cambridge. From 1996 to 2000, she was reader in immunology. In 1999, she was a visiting professor at the University of Washington, Seattle. On 1 October 2000, she was granted a personal chair and appointed professor of immunobiology. In 2013, she retired from full-time academia; she was appointed professor emeritus and made an emeritus fellow of King's College.

== Personal life ==
In 1969, the then Anne Syme married Jonathan Cooke. Together, they have two sons.

== Honours ==
In 2007, Cooke was elected a Fellow of the Academy of Medical Sciences (FMedSci). On 18 November 2010, she was awarded an honorary doctorate by the University of Copenhagen. In 2011, she was elected a Fellow of the Royal Society of Biology (FRSB).

== Selected works ==
- Male, David; Cooke, Anne; Owen, Michael; Trowsdale, John; Champion, Brian (1996). Advanced immunology (3rd ed.). London: Mosby. ISBN 978-0723420590.
