= Edgar Baird =

Edgar Albert Baird, ONL (May 28, 1911 – May 1, 2005) was a businessman born in Campbellton in the Dominion of Newfoundland. Baird was the founder of the Newfoundland chapter of the Junior Forest Rangers, and worked in the forestry and aviation industry where he was Chief Woods Ranger for Newfoundland, responsible for forest fire protection initiatives for Newfoundland and Labrador.

As superintendent of the Newfoundland Forestry Unit, Baird led a battalion of 960 foresters to Scotland in 1940, the largest single battalion ever to leave the province. In 1941 he signed up with the Royal Air Force and rose to the rank of Flight Lieutenant.

Following the war, Baird led a group of local residents who were lobbying to form a new town site in what would become Gander. He was later appointed the first chairman of the Gander Local Improvement District and built the first private dwelling in Gander in 1951. Both a Gander street and local trail are named in his honour.

In 1961, Baird volunteered as fire boss during the great forest fire that devastated Bonavista North.

He was invested as a member of the Order of Newfoundland and Labrador in 2004.

== See also ==
- List of people of Newfoundland and Labrador
- List of communities in Newfoundland and Labrador
