= Hugh Baird (cricketer) =

Australian cricketer

Personal information
- Born: 27 December 1911; Perth, Western Australia
- Died: 18 July 1965 (aged 53); Peppermint Grove, Western Australia
- Source: Cricinfo, 26 September 2017

Hugh Baird (27 December 1911 – 18 July 1965) was an Australian cricketer. He played his only first-class match in 1929/30, for Western Australia.
