= David Baird (author) =

Canadian composer and theatre director

David Baird (born 1956 in Canada) is a composer and theatre director who has published books on a wide range of subjects including film, art, Shakespeare, and spirituality.

He was on the production staff of the Welsh National Opera and Drama Company He was co-founder/director of Cardiff Lab Theatre, and Artistic Director of Doppelganger Theatre and Handspan Theatre Australia. He is Musical Director with MakeBelieve Arts for touring shows: "The Lorax", "Gulliver's Travels" and "The Woman Who Cooked Everything".

== Works ==
- A Thousand Paths Sourcebooks, Inc. (April 1, 2000), ISBN 978-1-57071-526-6
- Shakespeare at the Globe, Spruce Books, 1998, ISBN 978-1-84072-038-9
