= Charles Baird =

Charles Baird may refer to:

- Charles Baird (engineer) (1766–1843), Scottish engineer
- Charles A. Baird (1870–1944), University of Michigan athletic director, 1898–1909
- Charles F. Baird (1922–2009), United States Under Secretary of the Navy and CEO of Inco Ltd.
- Charles Washington Baird (1828–1887), American Presbyterian minister and historian

== See also ==
- Charles Baird Curtis (1860–1936), vice-president of the United States
