= Edward Baird =

Edward Baird may refer to:

- Edward Baird (artist) (1904–1949), Scottish artist
- Edward Baird (rugby) (1885–1917), Australian rugby league footballer
- Edward A. Baird (1933–2000), American bass and voice teacher
- Edward Kellogg Baird (1876–1951), American attorney and the president of the Century Opera Company

== See also ==
- Ed Baird (born 1958), American sailor
