= William Baird =

Bil, Bill, Billy or William Baird may refer to:

== Politicians ==
- William Baird (MP) (1796–1864), Scottish industrialist and Tory MP for Falkirk Burghs
- William L. Baird (1843–1916), American mayor of Lynn, Massachusetts
- William Alexander Baird (1867–1940), Canadian member of Legislative Assembly of Ontario, a/k/a W. A. Baird

== Sportsmen ==
- William Baird (footballer) (1874–1943), Scottish centre half for Dundee
- Billy Baird (footballer) (1876–after 1897), Scottish forward in Football League for Stoke
- Billy Baird (1884–1968), Canadian pioneering professional ice hockey player
- Bill Baird (American football) (born 1939), American defensive back for New York Jets
- Bill Baird (racing driver) (born 1949), American champion of ARCA Bondo/Mar-Hyde stock car series

== Writers ==
- William Baird (physician) (1803–1872), Scottish author of The Natural History of the British Entomostraca (1850)
- William Teel Baird (1819–1897), Canadian military historian in New Brunswick
- William Raimond Baird (1848–1917), American publisher of Baird's Manual of American College Fraternities
- William M. Baird (1862–1931), American Presbyterian missionary, diarist and man of letters
- Bill Baird (activist) (born 1932), American reproductive rights pioneer, founder of Pro Choice League
- Bill Baird (musician), American experimental technologist and writer for San Antonio Current since 2000

== Others ==
- Bil Baird (1904–1987), American TV and film puppeteer

== See also ==
- Baird baronets
