= Andrew Baird =

Andrew Baird may refer to:

- Andrew Baird (footballer) (1866–1916), Scottish footballer
- Andrew Blain Baird (1862–1951), Scottish blacksmith and aviation pioneer
- Andrew Wilson Baird (1842–1908), Scottish colonel of the Royal Engineers
- Andy Baird (born 1979), Scottish footballer
- Andrew Baird (film director) (born 1976), Irish film director
