= George Baird =

George Baird may refer to:

- George Baird (architect) (1939–2023), Canadian architect
- George Baird (sprinter) (1907–2004), American athlete and 1928 Summer Olympics gold medal winner
- George Alexander Baird (1861–1893), British racehorse owner, breeder and amateur jockey
- George Frederick Baird (1851–1899), Canadian politician and lawyer
- George Baird (minister) (1761–1840), Church of Scotland minister and principal of the University of Edinburgh
- Sir George Henry Baird (1871–1924), Royal Navy officer
- George M. Baird (1839–?), New York politician
- George N. Baird, American computer scientist
- George Thomas Baird (1847–1917), Canadian politician
- George W. Baird (1839–1906), US Army officer and Medal of Honor recipient

== See also ==
- George Baird Hodge (1828–1892), attorney, Confederate politician and general from the Commonwealth of Kentucky
