= James Baird =

James Baird may refer to:

- Sir James Baird, 2nd Baronet (c. 1658–1715), British baronet
- James Baird (British Army officer) (1915–2007)
- James Baird (civil engineer) (1872–1953), builder of the Lincoln Memorial and quarterback of the Michigan Wolverines football team
- James Baird (footballer) (born 1983), Scottish goalkeeper/soccer player
- James Baird (industrialist) (1802–1876), Scottish industrialist and MP for Falkirk Burghs
- James Baird (merchant) (1828–1915), Newfoundland merchant and activist
- James Baird (trade unionist) (1878–1948), Northern Irish politician and activist
- James Bryson Baird (1859–1939), Canadian politician
- Jim Baird (American football) (1874–1938), American college football player of the 1890s
- Jim Baird (Australian footballer) (1920–2003), Australian rules footballer
- Jim Baird (politician) (born 1945), U.S. representative from Indiana
- Jim Baird (rugby union), New Zealand international rugby union player

== See also ==
- James Baird State Park in New York
