= John Baird =

John Baird may refer to:

== Sports ==
- John Baird (American football) (born c. 1877), All-American football player
- John Baird (Australian footballer) (born 1980), Australian rules footballer
- John Baird (cyclist), former racing cyclist from New Zealand
- John Baird (footballer, born 1870) (1870–1905), Scottish footballer
- John Baird (footballer, born 1985), Scottish footballer playing for Forfar Athletic
- John Campbell Baird (1856–1902), Scottish footballer

== Politics and government ==
- John Baird, Lord Newbyth (1620–1698), Scottish advocate, judge, politician and diplomat
- John Baird, 1st Viscount Stonehaven (1874–1941), eighth Governor-General of Australia
- John Baird (Canadian politician) (born 1969), Canadian politician and former cabinet minister
- John Baird (Michigan politician) (1859–1934), Michigan State Representative and Senator

=== British MPs ===
- Sir John Baird, 2nd Baronet (1686–1745), Scottish Member of Parliament for Edinburghshire
- John Baird (North West Lanarkshire MP) (1852–1900), Member of Parliament, 1885–1886
- John Baird (Wolverhampton MP) (1906–1965), British Labour Party Member of Parliament, 1945–1964
- John George Alexander Baird (1854–1917), Member of Parliament for Glasgow Central

== Military officers ==
- John Baird (educator) (1795–1858), Irish-born British Army instructor
- John Baird (RAF officer) (1937–2020), British physician and Royal Air Force medical officer
- John Baird (revolutionary) (1790–1820), Scottish commander in the "Radical War" of 1820
- John Baird (Royal Navy officer) (1832–1908), Victorian British Admiral

== Divines ==
- John Baird (Irish divine) (died 1804)
- John Baird (Scottish divine) (1799–1861)

== Others ==
- John Baird I (1798–1859), Glasgow architect
- John Logie Baird (1888–1946), Scottish engineer, invented the first working television system
- John Wallace Baird (1869–1919), Canadian psychologist
- John Washington Baird (1852–1923), American chess master

== See also ==
- Jon S. Baird, Scottish film and television director
