= Donna Baird =

American epidemiologist and biologist

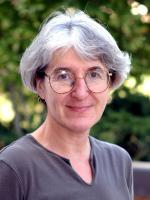
- Education: Macalester College (B.A.); University of Minnesota (Ph.D.); University of North Carolina at Chapel Hill (M.P.H.)
- Scientific career
- Fields: Women's reproductive health
- Workplaces: National Institute of Environmental Health Sciences

Donna Day Baird is an American epidemiologist and evolutionary-population biologist. She is a senior investigator at the National Institute of Environmental Health Sciences. She is known for her research in reproductive health through NIEHS.

== Early career and education ==
Baird completed a bachelor of arts in biology, Phi Beta Kappa, at Macalester College in 1968. From 1968 to 1969, she was a laboratory technician in the department of anatomy at University of Minnesota (UMN). Baird was a research analyst for the American Rehabilitation Foundation from 1969 to 1972. She was a research and teaching assistant in the department of ecology at UMN from 1972 to 1976.

Baird was trained as an evolutionary/population biologist in the Ecology Department at UMN. From 1978 to 1979, Baird was an instructor in the departments of ecology and anthropology at UMN. She earned a Ph.D. in evolutionary ecology from UMN in 1980. Her dissertation was titled Dispersal in Microtus pennsylvanicus. In 1980, Baird was a post-doctoral fellow at the Northern Illinois University Center for Biopolitical Research. From 1981 to 1982, Baird was a staff associate for biological sciences curriculum study in Boulder, Colorado. In 1983, she was a graduate teaching assistant in the department of epidemiology at University of North Carolina at Chapel Hill.

Baird's post-doctoral work at the University of North Carolina provided the opportunity for train in reproductive epidemiology. She earned a M.P.H. in epidemiology from University of North Carolina in 1984. Her thesis was titled Cholesterol change during menopause.

== Career ==
Baird joined the National Institute of Environmental Health Sciences (NIEHS) in 1984 as a senior staff fellow. In 1990, she became an epidemiologist, senior investigator, and principal investigator. At NIEHS, Baird began by studying fertility and developing epidemiologic methods for studying it. She has longstanding interest in hormones and fertility as well as early pregnancy events (implantation, corpus luteum rescue, the luteal placental shift in support of the pregnancy, as well as pregnancy complications and pregnancy outcomes). More recently, Baird developed a research program in uterine fibroid epidemiology. She mentors people at all levels.

=== Research ===
Baird's research has focused on women's reproductive health, especially understudied conditions. One of her most significant research projects is her study of the measure of uterine fibroids in African Americans. Through this, they discovered that vitamin D may be important for maintaining fibroids. In addition, getting a fibroid ultrasound can be indicative of a needing a procedure in the future. In addition to research in specific content areas, she is interested in developing new methodologies including techniques for data collection and analysis.

== Awards and honors ==
In 2008, Baird was awarded the Pearl Memorial Lecturer from the Human Biology Association. Then, in 2010, Baird was elected to the American Epidemiological Society. Baird received the John Snow Award from the American Public Health Association in 2023.

== Selected publications ==
1. Baird DD, Wilcox AJ. Cigarette smoking associated with delayed conception. JAMA. 1985 May 24–31;253(20):2979-83. PMID 3999259.
2. Baird DD, Dunson DB, Hill MC, Cousins D, Schectman JM. High cumulative incidence of uterine leiomyoma in black and white women: ultrasound evidence.(external link) Am J Obstet Gynecol. 2003;188(1):100-7.
3. Peddada SD, Laughlin SK, Miner K, Guyon JP, Haneke K, Vahdat HL, Semelka RC, Kowalik A, Armao D, Davis B, Baird DD. Growth of uterine leiomyomata among premenopausal black and white women.(external link) Proc Natl Acad Sci U S A. 2008;105(50):19887-92.
4. Baird DD, Hill MC, Schectman JM, Hollis BW. Vitamin d and the risk of uterine fibroids.(external link) Epidemiology. 2013;24(3):447-53.
