= Robert W. Baird =

American businessman

- Born: 1 April 1883
- Died: 12 March 1969 (Age 85)
- Education: Northwestern University
- Occupation: Businessman
- Title: Lead Partner, President, Robert W. Baird & Company
- Spouse: Ora Davenport Baird

Robert Wilson Baird (1883–1969) was an American businessman who helped found the Robert W. Baird & Co., and led it for more than 40 years.

== Career ==
He was a lead partner of the First Wisconsin Company, a Milwaukee, Wisconsin-based investment firm, when it was founded in 1919 as a spin-off from First Wisconsin Bank. He became the firm's president in 1922 and remained at the helm when the company separated from the First Wisconsin National Bank in 1934. He was named chairman when the firm joined the New York Stock Exchange in 1948. Following the tradition of companies joining the NYSE, the firm took the name of its lead partner and officially became Robert W. Baird & Co. He retired from the company in 1960, at age 77, and he died on 12 March 1969, at the age of 85.

Today Baird is an international, employee-owned financial services firm providing wealth management, capital markets, private equity, and asset management services to individuals, corporations, institutional investors, and municipalities. With more than 3,400 employees, Baird has offices in the United States, Europe, and Asia, and is one of the largest privately held, full-service investment firms in the United States. Baird manages and oversees more than $203 billion in client assets.

== Professional philosophy and achievements ==
Following the Wall Street crash of 1929, Robert W. Baird was one of two men selected by the U.S. government to help develop legislation designed to put the securities-investment business on substantially more solid footing. He traveled widely within investment banking circles, sharing and fostering his belief that the whole industry must maintain the highest standards of integrity in dealing with investors and investment banking customers.

A founding member of the NASD (National Association of Securities Dealers) and its third national chairman, Baird was known for his integrity and his steadfast commitment to putting clients' interests first. He was quoted in a Milwaukee Journal article dated Dec. 18, 1960, as saying: "They (the customers) will forgive you for errors of judgment, but they won’t forgive you for errors of motive". He is also credited with the credo: "Honesty in our business dealings and integrity in everything we do".

== See also ==
- Robert W. Baird & Co.
