= Doug Baird =

Doug Baird may refer to:

- Doug Baird (Australian footballer) (born 1950), Australian rules footballer
- Doug Baird (baseball) (1891–1967), American baseball player
- Doug Baird (footballer, born 1935) (1935–2002), Scottish footballer

== See also ==
- Douglas Baird (born 1953), American legal scholar
- Douglas Baird (Indian Army officer) (1877–1963), British officer in the Indian Army
