= Joyce Baird (diabetologist) =

Scottish diabetes clinical and academic researcher

- Born: 24 June 1929; Glasgow, Scotland
- Died: 5 August 2014; Newcastle
- Education: MA (1949), MBChB (1954) Aberdeen University
- Occupation(s): diabetologist, medical researcher and clinician
- Employer(s): Western General Hospital, Edinburgh
- Organization: Vice President European Association for the Study of Diabetes
- Known for: research and clinical model for self care in diabetes
- Parent(s): Sir Dugald Baird and May Baird CBE

Joyce Baird (1929 – 2014) was a Scottish diabetes clinical and academic researcher, internationally cited for her work in both laboratory and clinical settings. Baird created the Metabolic Unit at the Western General Hospital, Edinburgh and established a model of patient care that allowed those with endocrine disorders to monitor and treat themselves without supervision, and was organised in 'family friendly' hours. Baird was Vice President of the European Association for the Study of Diabetes. A new 'Baird Family Hospital' is opening in Aberdeen, Scotland in 2021, named for Joyce Baird, her parents and her brother's contribution to UK medicine.

== Early life and education ==
Joyce Baird was born in Glasgow, Scotland on 24 June 1929 to a pioneering medical family. Baird moved to Aberdeen in 1937, where her father Sir Dugald Baird was Regius Professor of Midwifery at Aberdeen University and led health care reforms for women in the UK and her mother Lady Matilda Deans or May Baird, CBE was also a doctor, and champion of women's health, and the first woman to chair a regional health board, and was the BBC's National Governor for Scotland. Baird had a sister Maureen and two brothers. One brother, Professor David Tennant Baird was involved in medical research including developing the 'morning after' pill for treating women as an 'emergency contraceptive', the other brother, D. Euan Baird, S.O.B., became CEO and Chairman of the Board of Schlumberger, a global oil exploration and scientific conglomerate until 2003.

Baird was educated at St. Margaret's School, Aberdeen and St. Leonards in St Andrews. At 16, she went to Aberdeen University to study English, moral philosophy, psychology and economic history and winning subject prizes and graduated from Aberdeen University (MA 1949). Turning from philosophy, Baird went on to study medicine at Aberdeen graduating MBChB in 1954. Baird captained the Scottish University women's hockey team. Baird married fellow physician, Jack Penman Splitt in 1958, and they had one daughter Miranda. Baird had to accumulate holidays to get time off with a new baby, and continued a career full-time. Miranda had two daughters Isobel and Helena; Baird's husband Jack died in 1974.

== Medical career ==
Baird's first medical job at Edinburgh's Royal Infirmary, included conducting clinical trials with Sir Derrick Dunlop (later the first Chairman of the Committee on the Safety of Drugs). Baird later worked as a medical officer in the Scottish Home and Health Department from 1968-1970, on 'developments in drugs, food additives and contaminants, nutrition and radioisotopes.' Baird was then appointed in 1971 as medical lecturer at Edinburgh's Western General Hospital. Her Professor John Strong asked Baird to set up one of the first clinics specifically designed for the management of patients with diabetes and endocrine conditions. Baird started the Metabolic Unit with close working between laboratory and clinical consultations not practical in a normal hospital ward. Baird developed this service to cover endocrine science, calcium metabolism, osteoporosis and other research, such as studying and treating diabetes in pregnancy, the impact of familial factors and obesity. Baird also collaborated closely with Anne Cooke, a leading immunologist working on animal models of disease and treatment, based in Cambridge.

Baird's methods reduced significantly the need for patients to be hospitalised, and she pioneered the use of glycated haemoglobin monitoring in 1978 and a computer data sharing system for local GPs to share the clinical care with the specialist unit in 1993.

Baird was appointed senior lecturer and honorary consultant in 1976, and Reader in 1998. Baird was highly regarded in her field, in 1992, the British Diabetic Association, invited her to deliver the Banting Memorial Lecture: A Cure for Insulin Dependent Diabetes: Dream or Reality? Baird's reputation in Europe, led to international conference and guest lecture engagements. Baird was chairman of the Nutrition Society and of the Juvenile Diabetes Federation International Medical Science Review Board, and became Vice President of the European Association for the Study of Diabetes.

== Death and legacy ==
Baird contracted Alzheimer's disease in later life, and died on 5 August 2014, in Newcastle, UK. Baird's legacy was the Metabolic Unit at the Western General Hospital, with a staff of 40 doctors, specialist nurses, dieticians and laboratory scientists working as one team on her view of 'how the care of diabetes should be done'. Baird's perception that quality health care should be accessible to all (and not privatised) and led on a modern view that self-management of chronic conditions worked best in terms of patient compliance, despite its challenge to clinicians in patient education and more flexible working between disciplines. Baird worked in the medical profession when both academic research and clinical work was 'dominated by men' and she was 'determinedly continuing to work full-time whilst juggling motherhood'.

Baird was respected for 'having a clear vision' and as ' a clinician who really cared about her patients and also researching treatment and prevention of disease'. Baird was considered a 'smart clever and a phenomenal mentor', politically astute as well as having a sense of humour and of the absurd. Baird put patient care and even patient hygiene first, even known to 'wipe up patient areas with a damp cloth'.

A new facility, Aberdeen's 'Baird Family Hospital' is opening in 2021, named for Joyce Baird and her brother D.T. Baird, their medical parents and the contribution the Baird family have made to medicine, especially for women, in Scotland and beyond.
