= Baird (investment bank) =

American investment firm

Robert W. Baird & Co. Incorporated

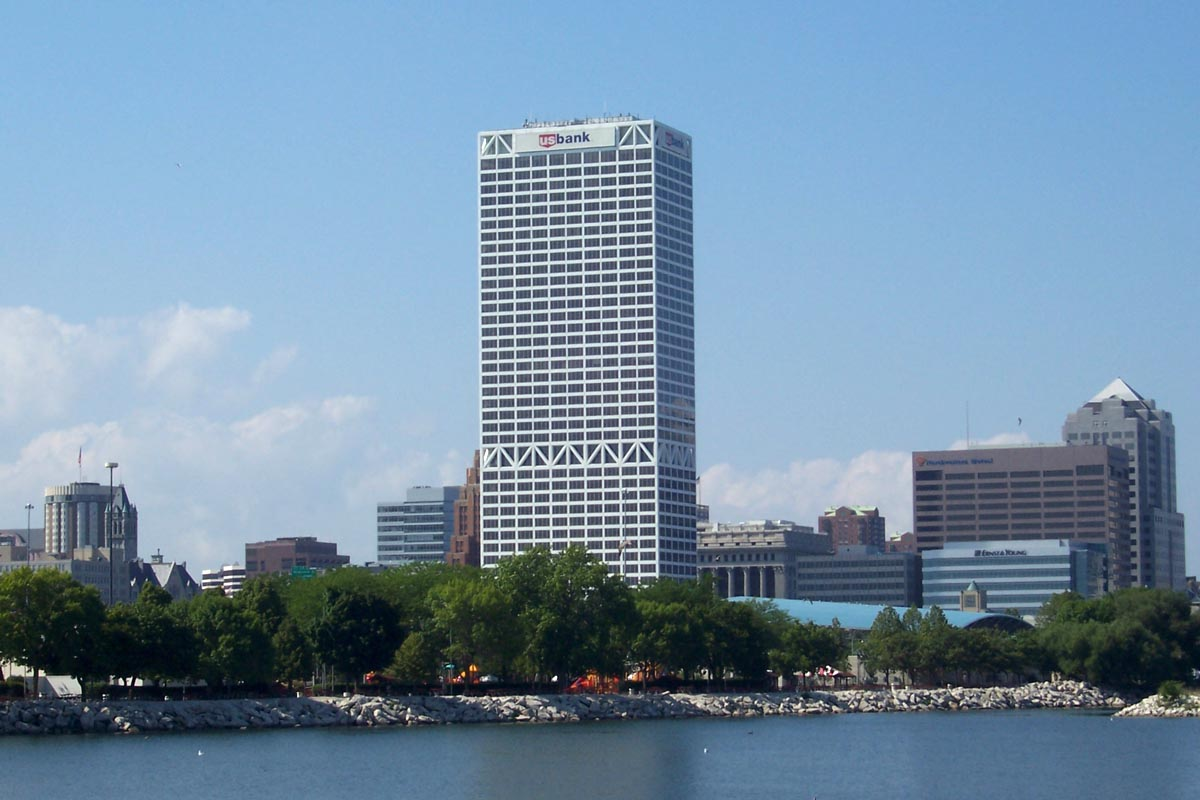
- Headquarters at U.S. Bank Center
- Type: Private
- Industry: Financial services
- Founded: 1919
- Founder: Robert W. Baird
- Headquarters: U.S. Bank Center; Milwaukee, Wisconsin, U.S.
- Area served: Worldwide
- Key people: Steve Booth (President & CEO)
- Products: Investment banking Equity capital markets Private equity Fixed income capital markets Asset management Private wealth management
- Revenue: ▲US$2.33 billion (2020)
- Operating income: US$ 360 million (2020)
- AUM: US$ 355 billion (2020)
- Owner: employees
- Number of employees: 4,500
- Parent: Baird Financial Corporation
- Website: www.rwbaird.com

Robert W. Baird & Co. is an American multinational independent investment firm and financial services company based in Milwaukee, Wisconsin. It is the principal U.S. operating subsidiary of Baird, an international, employee-owned firm providing investment banking, capital markets, private equity, wealth management, and asset management services to individuals, corporations, institutional investors, and municipalities.

With more than 4,500 employees, Baird has offices in the United States, Europe, and Asia, and is one of the largest privately held, full-service investment firms in the United States. Baird manages and oversees over $355 billion in client assets. Baird's principal operating subsidiary outside the United States is Robert W. Baird Group Ltd. in Europe. In Asia, Baird has an operating subsidiary supporting its private equity operations, as well as an investment banking team.

== History ==
Baird was founded in 1919 as the securities arm of the First Wisconsin National Bank (now part of U.S. Bancorp) in Milwaukee, Wisconsin. In 1934, the firm became an independent entity called The Securities Company of Milwaukee, Inc.

When the firm joined the New York Stock Exchange in 1948, it took the name of its lead partner since inception, Robert W. Baird.

From 1982 to 2004, Northwestern Mutual Life owned a majority interest in Baird. In 2004, Baird became a fully independent, employee-owned financial services firm. Its headquarters remain in Milwaukee.[9]

== Businesses ==
Baird is organized into five business units: private wealth management, asset management, investment banking/equity capital markets, fixed income capital markets and private equity.

=== Private wealth management (PWM) ===
Baird Financial Advisors provide financial advice, planning strategies, and investments to high-net-worth individuals and institutional clients, managing and overseeing more than $235 billion in client assets.

An in-house team of investment research and other specialists provide clients with services including portfolio management, retirement planning, philanthropic gifting, and risk management. The group also provides retirement plans, stock option exercise programs, hedging strategies and business transition planning to executives and corporate clients.

PWM operates from more than 160 branch offices in 33 states across the United States.

=== Asset management ===
Equity and fixed income money managers serve investors—including public and private retirement plans, corporations, foundations, and other institutional clients—and high-net-worth individuals. In 2008, Baird Public Investment Advisors was formed specifically to advise and assist public entities. Together, Baird Advisors and Baird Equity Asset Management have more than $120 billion under management.

Baird offers mutual funds through Baird Funds, including fixed income mutual funds managed by Baird Advisors and equity mutual funds managed by Baird Investment Management.

=== Equity capital markets ===
The global investment banking team serves primarily middle-market companies and has advised on nearly 200 financing and advisory transactions in 2020 with a total value of more than $70 billion. Additionally, equity sales and trading professionals make Baird's equity research available to institutional investors in North America, Europe, Asia, and Australia.

As of 2020, Baird research analysts provide dedicated coverage of over 725 stocks. Baird's Sales & Research capabilities have consistently placed the firm among the top Small/Mid-Cap Equity platforms according to the annual survey of U.S. Equity Investors issued by Greenwich Associates.

=== Fixed income capital markets ===
Baird's Public Finance team within fixed income capital markets delivers underwriting, advisory, consultant and. placement agent services to clients across the public, private, and nonprofit sectors. Baird was the No.1 municipal underwriter in the U.S. for the 12th consecutive year, based on number of issues according to Ipreo MuniAnalytics. Baird also ranked among the top five municipal advisors nationwide, also based on the number of issues according to Ipreo MuniAnalytics.

Baird's Fixed Income Sales & Trading team includes more than 135 sales, trading and analytics professionals who serve from offices across the U.S. Baird also continues to deepen their capabilities in key areas of the fixed income market. Baird achieved the best-ever year for revenues, and their team traded an average $23.7 billion per month - an increase of 21% over 2019.

=== Private equity ===
Baird Capital makes venture capital, growth equity, and buyout investment in three specific industry sectors through a series of partnerships in the United States, Europe, and Asia. In the United States, Baird Capital Partners makes buyout investments in lower-middle-market companies in the business services, manufactured products, and healthcare sectors. Baird Venture Partners invests in early-stage and expansion-stage U.S.-based companies in the areas of business services and life sciences.

Operating in the United Kingdom, Baird Capital Partners Europe provides change-of-control capital to lower-middle-market companies with a particular interest in business services, healthcare, and manufactured products.

Baird Capital Partners Asia provides capital to companies with substantial operations and growth opportunities in China.

Baird Capital and its affiliates have raised and managed $3.8 billion in capital and invested in more than 325 portfolio companies since the group's inception in the late 1980s.
