= Harry Baird =

Harry or Henry Baird may refer to:

- Harry Baird (actor) (1931–2005), actor who appeared in the science fiction series UFO
- Harry Baird (footballer) (1913–1973), Northern Irish footballer
- Henry Baird (cricketer) (1878–1950), Welsh cricketer and British Army officer
- Henry Martyn Baird (1832–1906), American historian and educationalist
- Henry S. Baird (1800–1875), American politician
- Henry W. Baird (1881–1963), American army general
- Douglas Baird (Indian Army officer) (Harry Beauchamp Douglas Baird, 1877–1963), British Army officer
