= Dugald Baird =

British medical professor

Dugald Baird FRCOG
- Portrait of Sir Dugald Baird
- Born: 16 November 1899; Greenock, Scotland
- Died: 7 November 1986 (aged 86); Edinburgh, Scotland
- Citizenship: British
- Education: University of Glasgow
- Medical career
- Profession: gynaecologist and obstetrician
- Institutions: University of Aberdeen

Sir Dugald Baird FRCOG (16 November 1899 – 7 November 1986) was a British medical doctor and a professor of obstetrics and gynaecology. Baird was most notable and influential in calling for the liberalising of abortion. In his delivery of the Sandoz lecture in November 1961, titled the Fifth Freedom, he advocated for freedom from the tyranny of fertility.

== Career ==
Baird was born in Greenock on 16 November 1899 to David Baird, head of the science department at Greenock Academy, and his wife May. He studied science and medicine at the University of Glasgow, graduating with an MB ChB in 1922 and went on to receive an MD with honours. His early experiences attending births in the Glasgow slums and in the city's Royal Maternity Hospital shaped his interest in the social and economic influences on the health of women, their babies, and across generations. He was awarded Fellowship of the Royal College of Obstetricians and Gynaecologists in 1935.

He moved to Aberdeen in 1936 as Regius Professor of Midwifery at the University of Aberdeen. During the next three decades, his main interests were in the areas of clinical practice, service provision and health policy in reproductive health, perinatal and maternal mortality, social obstetrics, sterilisation, induced abortion, and cervical screening. With his wife Lady Matilda Deans Baird, also a physician, Baird established the first free family planning clinic in Aberdeen.

In 1951 he set up the Aberdeen Maternity and Neonatal Databank, which continues today to link all the obstetric and fertility-related events occurring to women from a defined population.

Baird formally retired in 1965. He died on 7 November 1986.

== Family ==
Baird and his wife had four children, two daughters and two sons. Their daughter, Joyce Baird worked as a doctor specialising in diabetes at the Western General Hospital in Edinburgh. Their son D. T. Baird, was instrumental in gaining approval for the use of RU-486 in the UK as an emergency contraceptive. Their son, D. Euan Baird, retired as CEO and Chairman of the Board of Schlumberger Ltd. in 2003, after a long career with the company.

== Awards and honours ==
In 1966, the Freedom of the City of Aberdeen was conferred on Baird and his wife for their contribution to medical science and health in the City and beyond.

He received an honorary doctorate from the University of Stirling in 1974.

The antenatal clinic at Foresterhill had been named after him in 1970. The Dugald Baird Centre for Research on Women's Health at Aberdeen Maternity Hospital is named in his honour.

He and his wife are commemorated by plaques at 38 Albyn Place, Aberdeen.

The Baird Family Hospital due to open in Aberdeen in 2027 is named for him, his wife, their daughter Joyce and son David, in recognition of the medical contributions they have all made in Scotland and to the profession. The hospital will offer maternity, gynaecology, breast screening and breast surgery services, as well as a neonatal unit, a centre for reproductive medicine, an operating theatre suite and teaching facilities.
