= Anthony Joseph Murphy =

Canadian politician

Anthony Joseph "Ank" Murphy (December 22, 1913 – February 18, 1996) was a Newfoundland athlete, sports organizer, and politician.

Murphy was born at St. John's, Newfoundland, December 22, 1913. He received his early education under the tutelage of the Irish Christian Brothers attending St. Patrick's Hall School on Queen's Road from 1920 until 1929. He was an above average athlete participating in various sports. He excelled in basketball, playing with the Wanderers Basketball team and from 1931 to 1939 inclusive won nine consecutive league championships, representing a record of outstanding achievement. He played soccer with the B.I.S. team, which won the league championship in 1937, 1938 and 1939. He played baseball with the Cubs team, which won the championship in 1931. He also made significant contributions to the St. John's Boy Scout Troupe, was a charter member of the Newfoundland Hiking Club, supported many local charities and organizations, especially his alma mater, the St. Patrick's Hall School. He was inducted into Sport NL's Hall of fame in 1978 for his achievements in baseball and other sports.

"Ank" Murphy served as acting Leader of the Opposition from 1969 to 1971 while the Progressive Conservative Party of Newfoundland and Labrador's leader, Frank Moores, did not have a seat in the House of Assembly. When Moores became Premier of Newfoundland following the 1972 provincial election he named Murphy to Cabinet as social services minister. Murphy held the seat of St. John's East from 1962 until his retirement in 1979. He died on February 18, 1996.
