= Bill Baird (musician) =

American musician

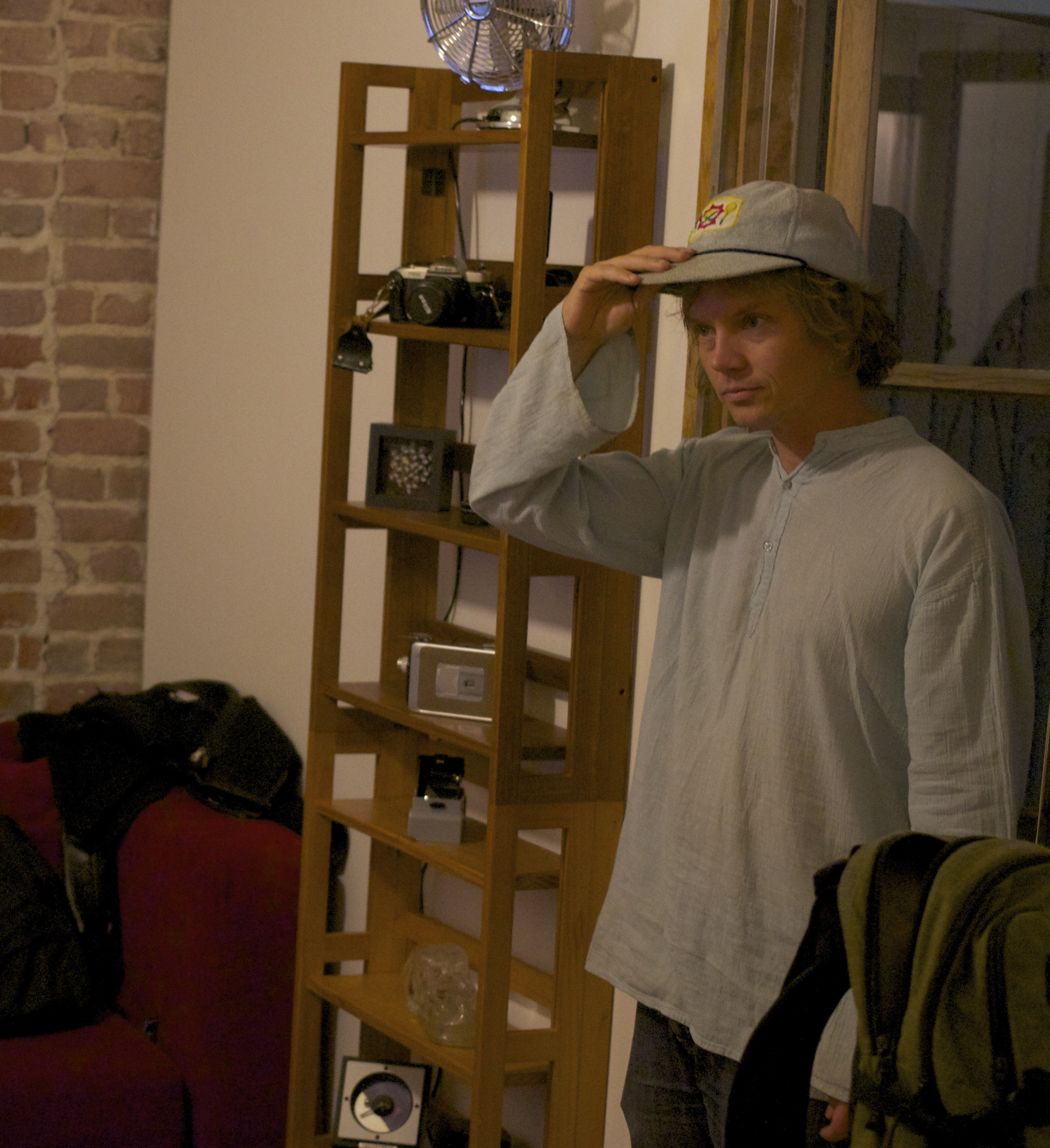

Background information
- Also known as: {{{Sunset}}}
- Genres: Neo psychedelia, psychedelic pop, Experimental, folk
- Occupations: Musician, songwriter
- Instruments: Vocals, guitar, tape machine, keyboard
- Years active: 2000–present
- Labels: Moon Glyph, Pau Wau, Autobus, Capitol Records, Talk Show Records, Super Deluxe
- Formerly of: Sound Team
- Website: www.billbillbillbillbill.com

Bill Baird is an American musician and creative technologist. Formerly a member of Sound Team, Baird began performing solo in 2006, first as {{{Sunset}}} and later under his own name. He appeared in the 2010 documentary Echotone, a chronicle of the Austin, Texas music scene, where he offered a negative assessment of his time signed to a major record label. He wrote an article along those lines for Impose Magazine, which turned into several more articles about the music industry. He has written a series of music and nature articles for the San Antonio Current.

== Performances and records ==
Baird first achieved success as a member of Sound Team (2001–2007), which was signed to Capitol Records in 2005 but dropped from the label after the commercial failure of their album Movie Monster. In 2006, Baird left Sound Team and began performing as {{{Sunset}}}, as well as under his own name. In late 2006, he self-released two cd-rs {{{Sunset}}} and Silence!, with the Paris Translantic calling the latter "strikingly personal and quite beautiful." NPR called {{{Sunset}}} "....beautifully lo-fi... a bare and innocent album that sounds as though a friend were strumming songs just for you in his living room." For live performances, he adopted the Sunset moniker from the aforementioned album title.

In 2008, Sunset released three full-length records to positive reviews, with Exclaim! writing:

Every so often there comes a record that stops you dead in your tracks, one that makes you sit up, take notice and soak in each and every note. Bright Blue Dream by {{{Sunset}}} is such a record.

Gorilla vs. Bear described Bright Blue Dream as "dense and adventurous" and compared it favorably to the work of Syd Barrett, Brian Eno and Ennio Morricone.

He played at the South by Southwest music festival as Sunset in 2008, with subsequent appearances in 2009, 2011, 2013, and 2015.

As {{{Sunset}}}, Bill Baird recorded the song 'Fishtown' at Miner Street Recordings in Philadelphia with Producer and Engineer Brian McTear and Producer Quentin Stoltzfus for Volume 0 Episode 1 of Weathervane Music's documentary video series Shaking Through.

In 2009, Baird was hired as a recurring national-anthem singer for the Richmond Flying Squirrels, a AA baseball team, and received side work dressing up as the team's Flying Squirrel mascot at community outreach events. Based on positive reception to his performances, he travelled with them on the road for part of the season. As a thank you for his efforts, the team signed him to a one-day player contract on August 14, 2009, and subbed him in as a second baseman in the sixth inning of a game against the Bowie Baysox. Baird batted 1-for-2 with an RBI triple. His earnings from the Flying Squirrels paid for his next two self-released records and funded his fall 2010 European tour.

These subsequent two self-released records, Career and Goodbye Vibrations, received critical praise, with Tiny Mix Tapes declaring "Bill Baird is one of the last rock n roll geniuses" and The Big Takeover calling Goodbye Vibrations "powerful."

In late 2010, he published a zine, "How Songwriting Ruined My Life," which led to songwriting workshops at the Esalen Institute as well as several Austin, TX high schools.

In 2011, Baird performed his final show as Sunset at the inaugural Gorilla vs. Bear Fest.

In 2013, Baird moved from Austin, Texas to Oakland, California to become a teaching assistant while pursuing an MFA in electronic music at Mills College; there, he released the album Spring Break of the Soul. Spring Break of the Soul was originally written as a musical but has not been performed. The vinyl packaging includes a copy of the script written for the musical. He described its album and its creation in a wide-ranging 2013 interview with Tiny Mix Tapes.

After its release, Baird was named "Best Newly Arrived East Bay Musician" by East Bay Express. In 2014, he performed at the Phono Del Sol music festival in San Francisco. Later that year, he released Diamond Eyepatch to positive reviews, with Popmatters claiming "he transcends genres even as he reinvents them." Upon finishing his time at Mills College, he was awarded the Frog Peak Collective Experimental Music Prize.

In 2016, he released the UK only 2XLP Earth into Aether, a selection of tracks from his self-released records, which The Guardian called "a lovely, warm, witty psychedelic journey" in a 4-star review. More positive reviews followed as well as live performances on several BBC programs. The album was Rough Trade album of the month and subsequently named one of its 100 best albums of the year. AllMusic gave the album 4 stars, saying "Earth into Aether is an opportune entrance point for those new to the artist, doubling as a well-curated playlist for established fans."

He subsequently released Summer is Gone, an orchestral album largely tracked live at Abbey Road Studios and ISSUE Project Room. In addition to standard release formats, the album featured a website, www.summerisgone.live, which created a unique track listing for each visitor. The interactive website was designed and programmed by Peter Browse and Caleb Al-Jorani of One Pixel Wide. The album won praise for its music, with the Financial Times describing the album as "engaging" in its 4-star review, stating, "Any album about the passing of time sets itself a stern challenge in justifying its claim on our time: Summer Is Gone passes the test."

In 2017, he released two more UK-only records, Easy Machines and Baby Blue Abyss, on the same day to positive critical response, with Classic Rock Magazine calling it in a 4-star review "the most focused, challenging singer-songwriter record in some years." The albums also earned 4-star reviews from Mojo, Uncut, Q, and Record Collector, with Record Collector writing, "Whichever one you’re listening to will be your favourite, but the fact there’s a contrasting-but-similar experience to turn to as one ends makes the experience hugely enjoyable. Why can’t more artists work like this?"

== Notable appearances / installations ==
In 2006, Baird gained notoriety by mocking the music review site Pitchfork Media, recording himself taking a pitchfork to a dummy branded with his band's name and uploading the video to YouTube.

In 2010, he appeared in Echotone, a documentary about the commercialization of the music scene in Austin, Texas. In the film, he recounted his negative experiences with being signed to a major record label. The film was a New York Times critic's pick and described Baird as "thoughtful." The Village Voice wrote of the film, "The ghostly ambassador...is Bill Baird, the magnetically awkward experimental rocker who emerged from a label deal gone wrong with a new band and a few rungs under his eyes."

The city of Austin, TX declared August 4, 2011 "Bill Baird Day" in honor of his music and place in the community.

Baird participated in the annual San Francisco Music Video Race competition in July 2014. The music video for his song "Soggy Soul," directed by Dan Lichtenberg of "Slow Clap Productions," was the runner up in the competition and also won "Best Concept" and "Best Use of Song Provided."

== Writing ==
In 2016, he recorded a segment for NPR about Lake Merritt.

In 2017, he penned article for Rough Trade on the alternative local history of the East Bay.

In 2020, he became a contributing writer for the San Antonio Current, with articles focused on music and nature. He wrote a series describing a 100-mile trek around San Antonio on foot.

== Creative Technology ==
In 2014, Baird was named artist-in-residence with the Paul Dresher Ensemble. While in residence, he finished the Magnetetractys, an invented instrument utilizing 9 strings and gloves embedded with magnetic coils. The instrument premiered in Impose Magazine, who wrote:

Bill’s body of work is confounding, intriguing, unique and thoughtful, sliding around on the slippery surface of psych-pop from folk intimacy to ambient suspense; we’re interested to see what dimensions the Magnetetractys will add to his songwriting work and potentially the work of others.

Baird and media artist Taurin Barrera debuted an immersive audio-visual installation at the Museum of Human Achievement in 2014 centered around a fictional time-share salesman and a bag of Chee-tos used as an electronic controller for all aspects of the room.

A public access opera, "Mundus Novus," written while in residence with Paul Dresher, was premiered at the 2015 Switchboard Music Festival in San Francisco. A corresponding live TV performance aired on his Berkeley Public Access TV show later that year.

Later in 2015, he collaborated with SwissNex, the SF Swiss Consulate, and Gray Area Foundation for the Arts on an interactive exhibition.

His video installation for The Society for Hard Determinists, a 2015 theater work, was nominated for the B. Iden Payne award for "Outstanding Media Design."

The following year, an interactive multi-media sculptural work, "It's Not a Bubble," premiered at the Fort Mason Center for Arts and Culture for the 2016 Soundwaves Festival. The installation subsequently featured at the California Academy of Sciences.

In addition, Baird has created a number of viral videos critiquing media saturation. His 2015 video, Ken Burns Says ‘Jazz’ 3 Billion Times (Actually 2.97 bn) In Under 3.5 Minutes, was featured by the AV Club. His 2016 video, Trump says "China" 1.35 billion times. Which is the actual population of China, featured on the Creator's Project, who wrote, "He crams thousands upon thousands of Trump's aggressive-yet-dismissive lilts into less than two minutes of video, culminating in a epileptic cacophony of red, white, and blue— exactly what we imagine a view of the American hellscape after four years of a Trump presidency might look like."

== Selected discography ==
=== With Sound Team ===
- Sound Team (2000)
- I'm Getting Laid Tonight b/w Folkswinger (2000)
- Into The Lens (2002)
- Yes Special Cassette (2004)
- Every Day is a New Year Cassette (2005)
- Marathon (2005)
- Work EP (2005)
- Movie Monster (2006)
- Born To Please (2006)
- Empty Rooms (2007)
- Work (2007)

=== As Sunset ===
- Pink Clouds (2008)
- Bright Blue Dream (2008)
- The Glowing City (2008)
- Gold Dissolves to Gray (2009)
- Loveshines/Looks Like I Fucked Up Again (2009)
- Loveshines But The Moon Is Shining Too (2010)

=== As Bill Baird ===
- {{{Sunset}}} (2006)
- Silence! (2010)
- Goodbye Vibrations (2011)
- Career (2012)
- Spring Break of the Soul (2013)
- Diamond Eyepatch (2014)
- Earth Into Aether (2016)
- Summer Is Gone (2016)
- Easy Machines (2017)
- Baby Blue Abyss (2017)
- Straight Time (2017)
- Gone (2018)
- Nighty Never Ending (2018)
- Owl (2019)
- Daily Ever Dawning (2019)
- Refractions (2019)
- Flower Children's Children's Children (2020)
- Standard Deviation (2020)
- Dead Man (2021)

=== As Morton Williams Baird ===
- CMGH I (2019)
- CMGH II (2019)
- CMGH III (2019)

=== As Bill Band ===
- Cape Disappointment (2018)
