= Hubert Evans Non-Fiction Prize =

Literary award in British Columbia, Canada

The Hubert Evans Non-Fiction Prize, established in 1985, is awarded annually as the BC Book Prize for the best non-fiction book by a resident of British Columbia, Canada. The prize is named after the Canadian novelist Hubert Evans (1892-1986).

== Winners and finalists ==
=== 1980s ===
Year	Author	Titles	Result	Ref.
1985	David Ricardo Williams	Duff: A Life in the Law	Winner	
1985	Michael Kluckner	Vancouver The Way It Was	Shortlist	
1985	Daniel Raunet	Without Surrender, Without Consent	Shortlist	
1986	Bruce Hutchison	The Unfinished Country	Winner	
1986	Muriel Kitagawa	This Is My Own: Letters to Wes	Shortlist	
1986	Reginald Roy	The Journal of Private Fraser	Shortlist	
1987	Doris Shadbolt	Bill Reid	Winner	
1987	Philip Croft	Nature Diary of a Quiet Pedestrian	Shortlist	
1987	Sherrill MacLaren	Braehead	Shortlist	
1988	P. K. Page	Brazilian Journal	Winner	
1988	Sandra Djwa	The Politics of the Imagination	Shortlist	
1988	Roy Minter	The White Pass	Shortlist	
1989	Robin Ridington	Trail To Heaven	Winner	
1989	Edith Iglauer	Fishing with John	Shortlist	
1989	Paul Yee	Salt Water City	Shortlist	

=== 1990s ===
Year	Author	Titles	Result	Ref.
1990	Philip Marchand	Marshall McLuhan	Winner	
1990	Stan Persky	Buddy's	Shortlist	
1990	Patricia Roy	A White Man's Province	Shortlist	
1991	Scott Watson	Jack Shadbolt	Winner	
1991	Terry Glavin	A Death Feast in Dimlahamid	Shortlist	
1992	Rosemary Neering	Down the Road	Winner	
1992	Jean Barman	The West Beyond the West	Shortlist	
1992	Robin Fisher	Duff Patullo of British Columbia	Shortlist	
1993	Lynne Bowen	Muddling Through	Winner	
1993	Irene Howard	The Struggle for Social Justice in B. C.	Shortlist	
1993	Rolf Knight, Homer Stevens	Homer Stevens	Shortlist	
1994	Sharon Brown'	Some Become Flowers	Winner	
1994	Arthur Mayse	My Father, My Friend	Shortlist	
1994	John Mills	Thank Your Mother for the Rabbits	Shortlist	
1995	Lisa Hobbs Birnie	Uncommon Will: The Death and Life of Sue Rodrigues	Winner	
1995	Denise Chong	The Concubine's Children	Shortlist	
1995	Rick Ouston	Finding Family	Shortlist	
1996	Claudia Cornwall	Letter From Vienna	Winner	
1996	Bev Christiansen	Too Good to Be True: Alcan's Kemano Completion Project	Shortlist	
1996	Sheryl Salloum	Underlying Vibrations: The Photography of John Vanderpont	Shortlist	
1997	Catherine Lang	O-bon in Chimunesu	Winner	
1997	Deanna Kawatski	Clara and Me	Shortlist	
1997	Arthur J. Ray	I Have Lived Here Since the World Began	Shortlist	
1998	Suzanne Fournier, Ernie Crey	Stolen from Our Embrace	Winner	
1998	Richard Bocking	Mighty River	Shortlist	
1998	Elizabeth Simpson	The Perfection of Hope	Shortlist	
1999	Peter C. Newman	Titans: How the New Canadian Establishment Seized Power	Winner	
1999	Eric Nicol	Anything for a Laugh: Memoirs	Shortlist	
1999	Michael Poole	Romancing Mary Jane	Shortlist	

=== 2000s ===
Year	Author	Titles	Result	Ref.
2000	Rita Moir	Buffalo Jump: A Woman's Travels	Winner	
2000	Douglas Cole	Franz Boas: The Early Years, 1858-1906	Shortlist	
2000	James P. Delgado	Across the Top of the World: The Quest for the Northwest Passage	Shortlist	
2000	Margaret Horsfield	Cougar Annie's Garden	Shortlist	
2000	Andrea Lebowitz, Gillian Milton	Gilean Douglas: Writing Nature, Finding Home	Shortlist	
2001	Terry Glavin	The Last Great Sea	Winner	
2001	Hugh Brody	The Other Side of Eden	Shortlist	
2001	Rosemary Neering	Wild West Women	Shortlist	
2001	Harold Rhenisch	Tom Thomson's Shack	Shortlist	
2001	Patricia Van Tighem	The Bear's Embrace	Shortlist	
2002	Susan Crean	The Laughing One: A Journey to Emily Carr	Winner	
2002	Bart Campbell	The Door is Open	Shortlist	
2002	Stephen Hume	Off the Map	Shortlist	
2002	Ross A. Laird	Grain of Truth	Shortlist	
2002	Heather Pringle	The Mummy Congress	Shortlist	
2003	Sandra Shields, David Campion	Where Fire Speaks: A Visit With the Himba	Winner	
2003	Thomas Berger	One Man's Justice	Shortlist	
2003	Keath Fraser	The Voice Gallery: Travels with a Glass Throat	Shortlist	
2003	Cole Harris	Making Native Space: Colonialism, Resistance and Reserves in British Columbia	Shortlist	
2003	Derek Lundy	The Way of the Ship	Shortlist	
2004	Maria Tippett	Bill Reid: The Making of an Indian	Winner	
2004	Maria Coffey	Where the Mountain Casts Its Shadow: The Dark Side of Extreme Adventure	Shortlist	
2004	Pat Wastell Norris	High Boats: A Century of Salmon Remembered	Shortlist	
2004	Peter Steele	The Man Who Mapped the Arctic	Shortlist	
2004	Mark Zuehlke	The Gothic Line: Canada’s Month of Hell in World War II Italy	Shortlist	
2005	Charles Montgomery	The Last Heathen	Winner	
2005	Katherine Palmer Gordon	The Slocan: Portrait of a Valley	Shortlist	
2005	Patrick Lane	There Is a Season	Shortlist	
2005	Alan Twigg	First Invaders: The Literary Origins of British Columbia	Shortlist	
2005	Rex Weyler	Greenpeace: How a Group of Ecologists, Journalists and Visionaries Changed the World	Shortlist	
2006	Stan Persky	The Short Version: An ABC Book	Winner	
2006	Michael Kluckner	Vanishing British Columbia	Shortlist	
2006	J. B. MacKinnon	Dead Man in Paradise	Shortlist	
2006	Rita Moir	Windshift Line	Shortlist	
2006	John Vaillant	The Golden Spruce: A True Story of Myth, Madness and Greed	Shortlist	
2007	Heather Pringle	The Master Plan: Himmler's Scholars and the Holocaust	Winner	
2007	Karsten Heuer	Being Caribou: Five Months on Foot with an Arctic Herd	Shortlist	
2007	Eric Miller	The Reservoir	Shortlist	
2007	Harold Rhenisch	The Wolves at Evelyn: Journeys Through a Dark Century	Shortlist	
2007	Dan Zuberi	Differences That Matter: Social Policy and the Working Poor in the United States and Canada	Shortlist	
2008	Robert Bringhurst	Everywhere Being is Dancing	Winner	
2008	J.B. MacKinnon, Alisa Smith	The 100-Mile Diet: A Year of Local Eating	Shortlist	
2008	Don Gayton	Interwoven Wild: An Ecologist Loose in the Garden	Shortlist	
2008	Theresa Kishkan	Phantom Limb	Shortlist	
2008	Patricia E. Roy	The Triumph of Citizenship: The Japanese and Chinese in Canada, 1941-67	Shortlist	
2009	Gabor Maté	In the Realm of Hungry Ghosts: Close Encounters with Addiction	Winner	
2009	Tim Lilburn	Going Home: Essays	Shortlist	
2009	Rex Weyler	The Jesus Sayings: The Quest for His Authentic Message	Shortlist	
2009	Chris Wood	Dry Spring: The Coming Water Crisis of North America	Shortlist	
2009	Ronald Wright	What Is America? A Short History of the New World Order	Shortlist	

=== 2010s ===
Year	Author	Titles	Result	Ref.
2010	Lorna Crozier	Small Beneath the Sky: A Prairie Memoir	Winner	
2010	Ehor Boyanowsky	Savage Gods, Silver Ghosts: In the Wild with Ted Hughes	Shortlist	
2010	Brian Brett	Trauma Farm: A Rebel History of Rural Life	Shortlist	
2010	Charles Demers	Vancouver Special	Shortlist	
2010	Brian Payton	The Ice Passage: A True Story of Ambition, Disaster, and Endurance in the Arctic Wilderness	Shortlist	
2011	John Vaillant	The Tiger: A True Story of Vengeance and Survival	Winner	
2011	Morris Bates, Jim Brown	Morris as Elvis: Take a Chance on Life	Shortlist	
2011	Douglas Coupland	Marshall McLuhan	Shortlist	
2011	Sarah Leavitt	Tangles: A Story about Alzheimer's, My Mother, and Me	Shortlist	
2011	Derek Lundy	Borderlands: Riding the Edge of America	Shortlist	
2012	Charlotte Gill	Eating Dirt	Winner	
2012	Carmen Aguirre	Something Fierce	Shortlist	
2012	Gary Geddes	Drink the Bitter Root	Shortlist	
2012	Theresa Kishkan	Mnemonic: A Book of Trees	Shortlist	
2012	JJ Lee	The Measure of a Man: The Story of a Father, a Son, and a Suit	Shortlist	
2013	Geoff Meggs, Rod Mickleburgh	The Art of the Impossible: Dave Barrett and the NDP in Power, 1972-1975	Winner	
2013	Luanne Armstrong	The Light Through the Trees: Reflections on Land and Farming	Shortlist	
2013	George Bowering	Pinboy	Shortlist	
2013	Sandra Djwa	Journey with No Maps: A Life of P.K. Page	Shortlist	
2013	Carol Shaben	Into the Abyss: How a Deadly Plane Crash Changes the Lives of a Pilot, a Politician, a Criminal and a Cop	Shortlist	
2014	David Stouck	Arthur Erickson: An Architect’s Life	Winner	
2014	Arno Kopecky	The Oil Man and the Sea: Navigating the Northern Gateway	Shortlist	
2014	J.B. MacKinnon	The Once and Future World: Nature As It Was, As It Is, As It Could Be	Shortlist	
2014	Bev Sellars	They Called Me Number One: Secrets and Survival at an Indian Residential School	Shortlist	
2014	Jane Silcott	Everything Rustles	Shortlist	
2015	Eve Joseph	In the Slender Margin: The Intimate Strangeness of Death and Dying	Winner	
2015	Julie Angus	Olive Odyssey: Searching for the Secrets of the Fruit That Seduced the World	Shortlist	
2015	Kevin Chong	Northern Dancer: The Legendary Horse That Inspired a Nation	Shortlist	
2015	Barry M. Gough	The Elusive Mr. Pond: The Soldier, Fur Trader and Explorer Who Opened the Northwest	Shortlist	
2015	Nancy Turner	Ancient Pathways, Ancestral Knowledge: Ethnobotany and Ecological Wisdom of Indigenous Peoples of Northwestern North America	Shortlist	
2016	Brian Brett	Tuco: The Parrot, the Others, and A Scattershot World	Winner	
2016	Briony Penn	The Real Thing: The Natural History of Ian McTaggart Cowan	Shortlist	
2016	Lorimer Shenher	That Lonely Section of Hell: The Botched Investigation of a Serial Killer Who Almost Got Away	Shortlist	
2016	Maria Tippett	Made in British Columbia: Eight Ways of Making Culture	Shortlist	
2016	Emily Urquhart	Beyond the Pale: Folklore, Family and the Mystery of Our Hidden Genes	Shortlist	
2017	Deborah Campbell	A Disappearance in Damascus: A Story of Friendship and Survival in the Shadow of War	Winner	
2017	Carmen Aguirre	Mexican Hooker #1: And My Other Roles Since the Revolution	Shortlist	
2017	Mohamed Fahmy, Carol Shaben	The Marriott Cell: An Epic Journey from Cairo’s Scorpion Prison to Freedom	Shortlist	
2017	Joy Kogawa	Gently to Nagasaki	Shortlist	
2017	Mark Leiren-Young	The Killer Whale Who Changed the World	Shortlist	
2018	Arthur Manuel, Ronald Derrickson	The Reconciliation Manifesto: Recovering the Land, Rebuilding the Economy	Winner	
2018	Carys Cragg	Dead Reckoning: How I Came to Meet the Man Who Murdered My Father	Shortlist	
2018	Theresa Kishkan	Euclid’s Orchard & Other Essays	Shortlist	
2018	Andrew Struthers	The Sacred Herb / The Devil’s Weed	Shortlist	
2018	Paul Watson	Ice Ghosts: The Epic Hunt for the Lost Franklin Expedition	Shortlist	
2019	Lindsay Wong	The Woo Woo	Winner	
2019	Bill Gaston	Just Let Me Look at You	Shortlist	
2019	Ian Hampton	Jan in 35 Pieces: A Memoir in Music	Shortlist	
2019	Kate Harris	Land of Lost Borders: Out of Bounds on the Silk Road	Shortlist	
2019	Rob Shaw, Richard Zussman	A Matter of Confidence: The Inside Story of the Political Battle for BC	Shortlist	

=== 2020s ===
Year	Author	Titles	Result	Ref.
2020	Alejandro Frid	Changing Tides: An Ecologist’s Journey to Make Peace with the Anthropocene	Winner	
2020	Ivan Coyote	Rebent Sinner	Shortlist	
2020	Helen Knott	In My Own Moccasins: A Memoir of Resilience	Shortlist	
2020	Jonathan Manthorpe	Claws of the Panda: Beijing’s Campaign of Influence and Intimidation in Canada	Shortlist	
2020	Jessica McDiarmid	Highway of Tears: A True Story of Racism, Indifference, and the Pursuit of Justice for Missing and Murdered Indigenous Women and Girls	Shortlist	
2021	Billy-Ray Belcourt	A History of My Brief Body	Winner	
2021	Eva Holland	Nerve: A Personal Journey Through the Science of Fear	Shortlist	
2021	Liz Levine	Nobody Talks About Anything But the End	Shortlist	
2021	Benjamin Perrin	Overdose: Heartbreak and Hope in Canada's Opioid Crisis	Shortlist	
2021	Seth Klein	A Good War: Mobilizing Canada for the Climate Emergency	Shortlist	
2022	Jordan Abel	NISHGA	Winner	
2022	Danielle Geller	Dog Flowers	Shortlist	
2022	Darrel J. McLeod	Peyakow: Reclaiming Cree Dignity	Shortlist	
2022	Suzanne Simard	Finding the Mother Tree: Discovering the Wisdom of the Forest	Shortlist	
2022	Ian Williams	Disorientation: Being Black in the World	Shortlist	
2023	Karen Bakker	The Sounds of Life: How Digital Technology Is Bringing Us Closer to the Worlds of Animals and Plants	Winner	
2023	Lyndsie Bourgon	Tree Thieves: Crime and Survival in North America's Woods	Shortlist	
2023	Michael J. Hathaway	What a Mushroom Lives For: Matsutake and the Worlds They Make	Shortlist	
2023	Harrison Mooney	Invisible Boy: A Memoir of Self-Discovery	Shortlist	
2023	Jody Wilson-Raybould	True Reconciliation: How to Be a Force for Change	Shortlist	
2024	John Vaillant	Fire Weather: The Making of a Beast	Winner	
2024	Colleen Brown	If you lie down in a field, she will find you there	Shortlist	
2024	Naomi Klein	Doppelganger: A Trip into the Mirror World	Shortlist	
2024	Helen Knott	Becoming a Matriarch	Shortlist	
2024	Emelia Symington-Fedy	Skid Dogs	Shortlist	
2025	Minelle Mahtani	May It Have a Happy Ending	Winner	
2025	Marilyn Bowering	More Richly in Earth: A Poet’s Search for Mary MacLeod	Shortlist	
2025	Gregor Craigie	Our Crumbling Foundation: How We Solve Canada’s Housing Crisis	Shortlist	
2025	Jennifer Grenz	Medicine Wheel for the Planet: A Journey Toward Personal and Ecological Healing	Shortlist	
2025	Danny Ramadan	Crooked Teeth: A Queer Syrian Refugee Memoir	Shortlist	
2026	Julian Brave NoiseCat	We Survived the Night: An Indigenous Reckoning	Winner	
2026	Sarah Boon	Meltdown: The Making and Breaking of a Field Scientist	Shortlist	
2026	Larry Grant, Scott Steedman	Reconciling: A Lifelong Struggle to Belong	Shortlist	
2026	Garth Mullins	Crackdown: Surviving and Resisting the War on Drugs	Shortlist	
2026	Phillip Seagram	No Judgement and Other Busking Stories	Shortlist	
