= Eaton's BC Book Award =

The Eaton's BC Book Award was first presented in 1975 and last awarded in 1983. Prior to the establishment of the BC Book Prizes in 1985, Eaton’s BC Book Award was one of the British Columbia's top literary prizes.

== History ==
The Eaton's BC Book Award was established by Any Wright of Eaton's book department in Vancouver in 1975. Most years the judges remained unchanged, featuring notable Vancouver figures Margaret Prang (UBC), Walter D. Young (UVic) and Gordon Elliott (SFU). The judges for the final award in 1983 were Margaret Prang, Leslie Peterson (Vancouver Sun) and Chuck Davis (author/broadcaster).

== Winners ==
The Eaton's BC Book Award presented the "best BC book of the year".

- Robert E. Cail, Land, Man and the Law: The Disposal of Crown Lands in British Columbia, 1871-1913 (UBC Press, 1974).
- Jack Hodgins, Spit Delaney's Island (Macmillan, 1976)
- Howard White (editor), Raincoast Chronicles First Five: Stories and History of the B.C. Coast (Harbour, 1976)
- Douglas Cole & Maria Tippett, From Desolation to Splendour: Changing Perceptions of the British Columbia Landscape (Clarke, Irwin, 1977)
- Terry Reksten, Rattenbury (Sono Nis, 1978)
- Ulli Steltzer & Catherine Kerr, Coast of Many Faces (Douglas & McIntyre, 1979)
- Barry Downs, Sacred Places (Douglas & McIntyre, 1980)
- Hugh Brody, Maps and Dreams (Douglas & McIntyre, 1981)
- Lynne Bowen, Boss Whistle: The Coal Miners of Vancouver Island Remember (Oolichan Books, 1982)
