= Frederick George Scott =

Canadian poet, Anglican army chaplain, and author (1861–1944)

The Reverend Frederick George Scott CMG DSO FRSC
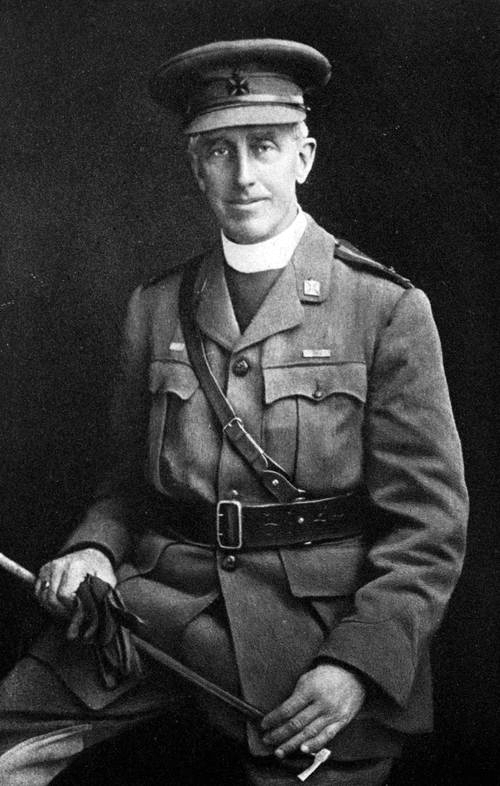
- Great War chaplain
- Born: 7 April 1861; Montreal, Quebec, Canada
- Died: 19 January 1944 (aged 82); Quebec City, Quebec, Canada
- Spouse: Amy Brooks (m. 1887)
- Children: William (b.1888), Henry (b. 1890), Mary (b. 1892), Elton (b. 1894), Charles (b. 1895), Francis (b. 1899), Arthur (b. 1901)
- Writing career
- Language: English
- Genre: Poetry
- Movement: Confederation Poets

Frederick George Scott CMG DSO FRSC (7 April 1861 – 19 January 1944) was for the first part of his life an Anglican priest and a Canadian poet to whom the Canadian literary establishment gave the epithet "Poet of the Laurentians." He was associated with Canada's Confederation Poets, and wrote 13 books of Christian and patriotic poetry, often using the natural world to convey deeper spiritual meaning.

He is better known for the latter part of his life. In his fifties, Scott became a chaplain in the Canadian Expeditionary Force sent to France during the First World War. Despite his insistence on remaining close to the front line to give assistance to the wounded, he survived many close calls until he was seriously wounded only weeks before the Armistice. He was subsequently decorated for bravery under fire. His memoir, The Great War As I Saw It, was favourably received by both critics and the Canadian public. The book was still in print a century after publication. Scott remained a British imperialist his entire life, and wrote many hymns eulogizing his country's roles in the Boer Wars and World War I.

== Early life ==
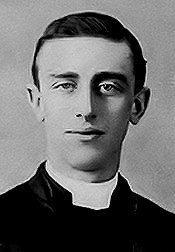
Shortly after ordination, 1886

Scott was born 7 April 1861 in Montreal, Quebec to Dr. William Edward Scott (a professor of anatomy at McGill University) and Elizabeth Scott (nee Sproston). On 1 July 1867, when he was six, his father took him to the grounds of McGill University to hear artillery being fired in celebration of the Confederation of Canada.

== Ordination ==
Scott attended Montreal High School before studying theology at Bishop's College, Lennoxville, Quebec, receiving a B.A. in 1881, and an M.A. in 1884. Scott wanted to become an Anglican priest but he was public in his admiration of the Anglo-Catholic views of the theologian and Anglican-turned-Catholic Cardinal John Henry Newman, who believed the Church of England needed to break away from political influences and return to liturgical practices similar to the Catholic Church. This was anathema to the fervently anti-Catholic Anglican church in Quebec, and Bishop William Bond refused to consider Scott for the priesthood.

Scott instead travelled to England in 1882, where he studied theology at King's College, London. While there, Scott befriended the 84-year-old hymn writer Matthew Bridges, another convert to Catholicism, who arranged for a meeting between Scott and Newman. Scott's biographer, Alan Hustak, believes that Scott, like both Newman and Bridges, might have considered converting to Catholicism and becoming a celibate priest, except he had recently met and become involved with a woman named Amy Brooks. Scott stayed an Anglican, becoming a deacon in 1884. Two years later he was ordained an Anglican priest at Coggeshall, Essex. Returning to Quebec, he served first at Drummondville, and then in Quebec City, where he became rector of St. Matthew's Anglican Church. In 1906, Scott became a canon of Holy Trinity Cathedral in Quebec.

== Personal life ==
In April 1887, Scott married Amy Brooks. They raised seven children: William Bridges (b.1888, became Chief Justice of the Quebec Superior Court); Henry Hutton (b. 1890, killed in World War I); Mary (b. 1892, married an Anglican priest); Elton (b. 1893, became professor at Bishop's College School); Charles Lennox (b. 1895, died age 9); Francis Reginald (b. 1899, became a lawyer, poet and co-founder of the New Democratic Party of Canada); and Arthur Elliot Percival (b. 1901, became a Quebec notary).

== Poet ==
In 1885, Scott printed his first chapbook, Justin and Other Poems, later included in The Soul's Quest and Other Poems (London 1888). Over the course of his life, he published another 12 volumes of poetry. Due to his use of spiritual and lyrical images taken from the natural world, he became known as "The Poet of the Laurentians." He was grouped with the Confederation Poets, first by anthologist W.D. Lighthall, who included two of Scott's poems in his 1889 anthology of the Confederation Poets, Songs of the Great Dominion. Lighthall also used a quotation from a Scott poem, "All the future lies before us / Glorious in that sunset land", on the title page as the book's epigraph. Scott was also a firm believer in the British Empire, and wrote several patriotic hymns during his life. In 1900, Scott was elected a Fellow to the Royal Society of Canada during the Quebec Tercentenary. At the ceremony he read an ode he had written for the occasion titled "Canada."

John Garvin, who included Scott's poems in his 1916 anthology Canadian Poets, wrote of him: "Frederick George Scott, 'The Poet of the Laurentians,' has this supreme gift as a writer: the art of expressing noble, beautiful and often profound thoughts, in simple, appropriate words which all who read can understand. His poems uplift the spirit and enrich the heart." "The Unnamed Lake " has been called his best-known poem.

Garvin included a quotation from M. O. Hammond writing in the Toronto Globe: "Frederick George Scott's poetry has followed three or four well-defined lines of thought. He has reflected in turn the academic subjects of a library, the majesty of nature, the tender love of his fellowmen, and the vision and enthusiasm of an Imperialist. His work in any one field would attract attention; taken in mass it marks him as a sturdy, developing interpreter of his country and of his times.[...] Living on the edge of the shadow-flecked Laurentians, he constantly draws inspiration from them, and more than any other has made articulate their lonely beauties."

Sandra Djwa wrote of his work "Several of Scott's early narrative poems, and his later didactic novel Elton Hazelwood (1891), describe typically Victorian crises of faith and the recognition of 'life and death as they are'.... Scott's many religious poems and his novel offer a more explicit rendering of the Victorian pessimism underlying the poetry of his more significant contemporaries, Charles G.D. Roberts and Archibald Lampman."

== Chaplain ==
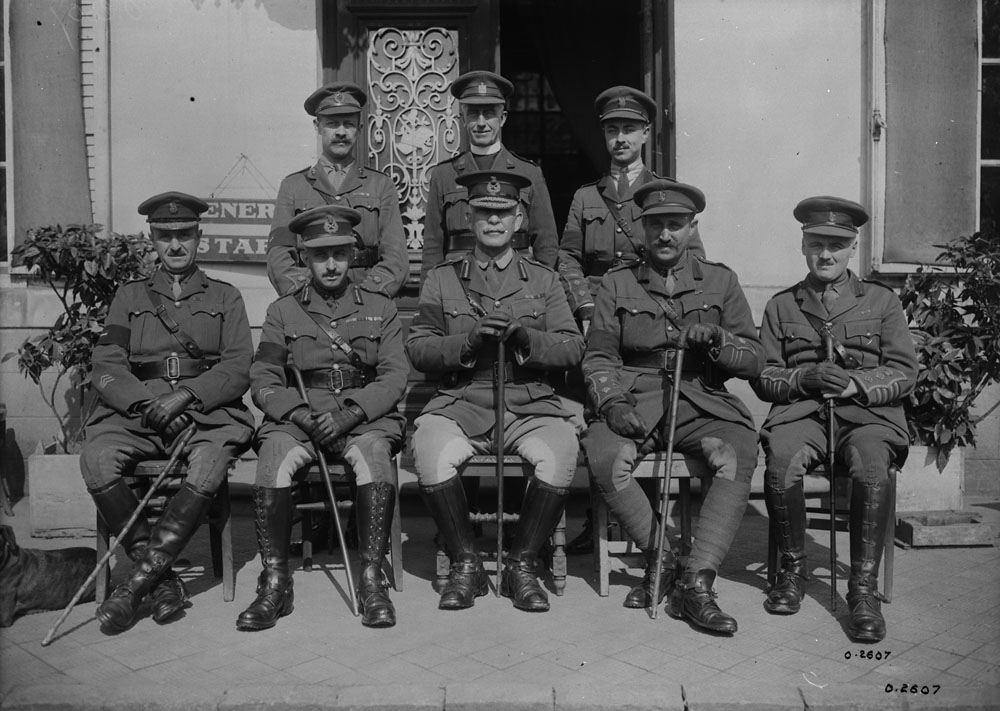
Staff officers of 1st Canadian Division, 1918. (Front row): Lieut-Col J. Parsons, Brig-Gen H. Thacker, Maj-Gen A. MacDonell, Lieut-Col J. Sutherland Brown, Col H. Wright. (Back row): Lieut-Col H. Hertzberg, Hon. Lieut-Col F.G. Scott, Lieut J. Macdonnell.

In 1914, Scott at age 53 was not only canon of Holy Trinity Cathedral in Quebec, but had been the chaplain of the 8th Royal Rifles for eight years. As talk of a possible European war ramped up in August 1914, Scott considered it would be his duty to accompany the Royal Rifles to Europe despite his age. The day before war was declared, Scott volunteered to join the Canadian Expeditionary Force as a chaplain. He was taken on as one of 31 chaplains of the 1st Canadian Division, and was given the honorary rank of captain. At the final church parade at the Valcartier training camp before the 1st Division embarked for Europe, Scott was asked to give the sermon before all 15,000 soldiers, as well as many notables including Prime Minister Robert Borden, Minister of War Sam Hughes, and the Governor-General (Prince Arthur, Duke of Connaught and Strathearn), his wife and their daughter Princess Patricia.

Scott travelled with the 1st Division across the Atlantic to their winter bivouac on the Salisbury Plain, where the men started to call him "Canon Scott." At the start of the war, chaplains were not seen as needed in France, and as the men prepared to leave for the front lines in January 1915, word reached Scott that only 5 of the 31 Canadian chaplains would be permitted to go to France. Scott spoke with the British Chaplain-General, who subsequently increased the number of chaplains to eleven. However, Scott himself was not included in this number, and was assigned to a hospital in Salisbury. Scott ignored this and smuggled himself into France by attaching himself to the 3rd Brigade under the pretense of searching for his hospital over in France, and convinced CEF commander General Edwin Alderson to make that appointment permanent. Despite Scott's apparent disregard for regulations, Alderson appointed him to be Senior Chaplain of the 1st Division in August 1915, and promoted him to the rank of honorary major in December 1915.

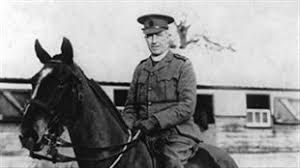
On his horse Dandy, France 1916.

Scott and the other chaplains were under orders to remain in the rear areas, and were not given any means of transportation. Nonetheless Scott often hitched a ride with whoever was heading to the front in order to visit the men in the trenches. As fellow chaplain Llewellyn Gwynne noted, Scott was "Always in the thick of the fighting, bearing almost a charmed life, ignoring any suggestion that he should be posted to a softer job 'further back.'" An article in the Anglican Journal recalled that "He often courted death to be with the soldiers, whom he saw as 'his boys.' Though he was commissioned as a major, he frequently went in the trenches wearing a private’s uniform with his clerical collar so as to mingle with the men more freely." Private Donald Cleal, while recuperating from wounds in August 1917, wrote in a letter to the Toronto Star "We have a chaplain here, Canon Scott, of Quebec, who has several medals. He earned them too. He is the Divisional Chaplain and entitled to stay in the rear. But no matter how thick the fight is, he is always to be seen wherever the boys are." At the Second Battle of Ypres, Scott was close enough to the German front line that bullets were striking the wall of the stable where he was comforting the seriously wounded. For his courage under fire while aiding the wounded, Scott was Mentioned in Despatches for the first time on 1 January 1916.

Scott often used a humorous tone when talking to the enlisted men. One time, when the teetotalling Scott was billeted in a room above an estaminet (a bar), he recounted "looking out of my window in the upper storey one day when the 2nd Battalion was marching past, and, to the breach of all good discipline, I called out to the men and asked them if they did not envy me my billet. A roar of laughter went up, and they asked me how I got there and if I could take them in as well. I told them that it was the reward of virtue, and only those who could be trusted were allowed to be housed in estaminets." Another time, while accompanying soldiers into the Second Battle of Ypres, a sergeant asked him, "Where are we going, Sir?" Scott replied, "That depends upon the lives you have led."

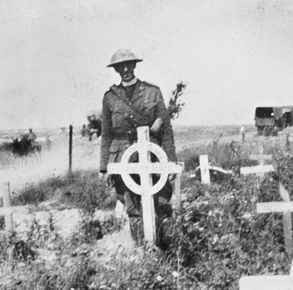
Standing by the grave of his son Henry, Bapaume Post Military Cemetery, 20 August 1918. Photograph by Australian war correspondent Charles Bean.

In March 1917, Scott was promoted to honorary lieutenant-colonel, and was made a Companion of the Order of St Michael and St George, but still insisted on visiting the front lines. His excursions to the various battalions were now easier because he had been given a horse, whom he called Dandy.

Scott's three oldest sons, William, Henry, and Elton, were also serving in the CEF. William, a private in the Royal Montreal Regiment, was badly wounded in one of the Canadian Corps' first actions in 1915 and lost an eye. Elton, a Rhodes scholar who interrupted his education to enlist as a lieutenant with the McGill Heavy Siege Artillery, was severely gassed in the spring of 1918. On 21 October 1916, during the Battle of the Somme, Captain Henry Hutton Scott, who served with the 87th Battalion (Canadian Grenadier Guards), was killed during an attack on Regina Trench. The men in Henry's battalion hastily buried him in no man's land where he had fallen. The raging battle made it impossible for Scott to visit the gravesite, and he refused to let Henry's men risk their lives to retrieve his body. A month later, Scott returned to the same spot and during the night, only accompanied by a few soldiers, cautiously moved out into no man's land to find Henry's grave and read the Anglican burial service for him. One of the soldiers, Alexander McClintock, later wrote, "The old chaplain stood beside the body and removed his trench helmet, baring his gray locks to the drizzle of rain that was falling. Then while we stood with bowed heads, his voice rose amid the noise of bursting shells, repeating the burial service of the Church of England. I have never been so impressed by anything in my life as by that scene." A few weeks later, Henry's body was recovered by a work party and reinterred in Tara Hill Cemetery (later renamed Bapaume Post Military Cemetery.) German advances placed the cemetery behind their lines for a time, but by the summer of 1918, the Allies had pushed their line forward so that the cemetery was once again behind Allied lines, and Scott was able to visit the new gravesite on 20 August 1918, a moment captured on camera by Australian war correspondent Charles Bean.

On 1 July 1917, the entire 1st Division held a special service to commemorate the 50th anniversary of Canadian Confederation, and Scott, aged 56, realized he was the only Canadian in the entire division who was old enough to remember the original Confederation Day.

Scott continued to spend as much time in the front lines as possible, and to aid this endeavour, he managed to appropriate a newly-arrived Clyno motorcycle and sidecar, with a driver to take him from place to place. When orders came to turn over the motorcycle for "proper" military use, Scott sought out General Arthur Currie, by then commander of the Canadian Corps, to gain permission to keep the Clyno. For his time at the front lines, he was Mentioned in Despatches a second time on 28 December 1917, and a third time in April 1918.

At the Battle of Amiens in August 1918, marking the start of the Hundred Days Offensive that brought the war to a close, Scott insisted on closely following the Canadian advance, going so far as to hitch a ride on the back of a tank that was moving forward. He followed so closely that he came upon three German soldiers hiding in a shell hole and took them prisoner. But Scott's run of luck at the front lines came to an end near Cambrai on 27 September 1918 when an exploding shell severely wounded him in both legs. He was moved from the front to a field station, and although he was a lifetime teetotaller, he asked for a tot of rum to help with the pain. He was later teased by his friends for this lapse, and wrote in his memoirs "A General wrote to me later on to say he had been terribly shocked to hear I was wounded, but that it was nothing in comparison with the shock he felt when he heard that I had taken to drinking rum." Scott was evacuated to a field hospital, and then to a hospital in London.

While he was recuperating, Scott was Mentioned in Despatches a fourth time, and awarded the Distinguished Service Order. The citation read:

For conspicuous gallantry and devotion to duty. He attended to the wounded under heavy fire, and by his cool and confident manner was a source of encouragement to the men when they were suffering heavy casualties. He behaved nobly and helped save many lives.

He was invalided back to Canada in May 1919, and spent time in Ste. Anne's Veteran Hospital in Quebec. On 31 October 1919, more than a year after he was wounded, he was discharged from the army due to permanent partial disability from his wounds.

== After the Great War ==
After the war Scott became chaplain of the army and navy veterans, and was Archdeacon of Quebec from 1925 to 1933. His 1922 book, The Great War as I Saw It, became "among the best-known of the early Canadian accounts of World War I." H.W.A. Foster, in the September 1922 issue of Canadian Historical Review, wrote that Scott's recollections were "characteristic of the man, who is a student of human nature, a poet, and a humourist. Told with quiet humour, his experiences furnish a very human document in the rapidly accumulating material dealing with Canada's part in the war." Scott's book eventually passed into the public domain, became available on Project Gutenberg in 2006, and was also still in print a century after its original publication.

During the Quebec Conference of 1943, Scott was invited by Winston Churchill and Franklin Roosevelt to a private meeting where he read some of his poetry.

Scott died on 19 January 1944 in Quebec City, leaving a daughter and four sons. Canadian Press reported that "Thousands of war veterans, friends and admirers of the 'grand old man' who as senior Protestant chaplain won the hearts of the Canadian Corps almost three decades ago, crowded Christ Church cathedral, and lined the sidewalks of University and St. Catherine streets to pay their final tribute."

Through his daughter, he is the grandfather of the archaeologist Helen Kelley Morrison and the great-grandfather of Geoffrey Kelley and Mark Kelley. His son, Francis Reginald Scott, became a renowned writer.

== Recognition ==
The Canadian Encyclopedia called him "an Anglican priest, minor poet and staunch advocate of the civilizing tradition of imperial Britain, who instilled in his son [F.R. Scott] a commitment to serve mankind, a love for the regenerative balance of the Laurentian landscape and a firm respect for the social order."

WWI veteran and writer Hubert Evans recalled that "most of us sensed pretty accurately the life purpose which actuated his heroism, his humanity, his unbelievable endurance. [...] it was in his rarely voiced but unalterable conviction that every last man of us was infinitely worth while. For to Canon Scott we were never those impersonal creatures known as 'other ranks.' [...] Somehow, for him regimental numbers didn’t exist. We were Jack, with a wife and kids waiting in the far-off Peace River country; or harum-scarum Bill, with an anxious mother in Vancouver; or Tommy, of Woodstock, N.B., whose sister would be hoping for a letter. [...] A man so sensitive, but without some inwardly fortifying power, could never have borne the tragedy and suffering he shared vicariously. And yet the strange, the all but incredible, part of it was that while he did care — cared tremendously — he could still make every day a victory."

== Publications ==
Poetry

- Justin and Other Poems. Quebec: private, 1885.
- The Soul's Quest and Other Poems . London: Kegan Paul, Trench & Co., 1888.
- My Lattice and Other Poems . Toronto: William Briggs, 1894. Montreal: C.W. Coates, 1894.
- The Unnamed Lake and Other Poems . Toronto: William Briggs, 1897.
- Poems Old and New . Toronto: William Briggs, 1899, 1900.
- A Hymn of Empire and Other Poems . Toronto: William Briggs, 1906.
- Poems. London: Constable, 1910.
- The Gates of Time, and Other Poems . London: Samuel Bagster & Sons, 1915.
- In the Battle Silences: Poems Written at the Front . Toronto: Musson, 1916.
- In Sun and Shade: A Book of Verse . Québec: Dussault & Proulx, 1926.
- New Poems. Quebec: Victor LaFrance Ltd., 1929.
- Selected Poems . Quebec: Emil Robitaille, 1933.
- Collected Poems . Vancouver: Clarke & Stuart Co. Ltd., 1934.
- Poems Old and New. London: Society for Promoting Christian Knowledge, 1936.

Plays

- The Key of Life. Quebec, 1907.

Prose

- Elton Hazelwood: a memoir by his friend, Henry Vane. New York: Whittaker, 1892. (a novel).
- The Great War As I Saw It . F.D. Goodchild, 1922.

Except where noted, bibliographic information from Canadian Poetry.
