= Lynne Bowen =

Canadian non-fiction writer, historian, professor, and journalist

- Born: August 22, 1940 (age 86); Indian Head, Saskatchewan, Canada
- Education: University of Alberta (B.Sc.); Malaspina College; University of Victoria (MA)
- Occupation: Writer
- Awards: Hubert Evans Non-Fiction Prize; 1993

Lynne Bowen (born August 22, 1940 in Indian Head, Saskatchewan) is a Canadian non-fiction writer, historian, professor, and journalist, best known for her popular historical books about Vancouver Island and British Columbia. Over the years, Bowen has won awards such as the Eaton's British Columbia Book Award (1983), the Lieutenant Governor's Medal for Writing British Columbia History (1987), and the Hubert Evans Non-Fiction Prize (1993).

== Biography ==
Lynne Bowen is a graduate of the University of Alberta (1958–1963) where she earned an R.N. in 1962, and a B.Sc. in Public Health Nursing in 1963, before moving to British Columbia in 1972 and raising three children. She continued her studies in history and literature at Vancouver Island University (then Malaspina College) and at the University of Victoria where she completed a Master of Arts in Western Canadian History. In 1980, three weeks after graduation, Bowen was approached by Nanaimo's Coal Tyee Society to write a book based on 105 interviews of Vancouver Island coal miners and their families. Nanaimo coal mines had closed 30 years before and the city had been home to some of the most important coal mines in the world, along with the one of largest explosions in history, the 1887 Nanaimo mine explosion. The miners wanted their oral histories preserved. Bowen compiled those oral histories in her first book, Boss Whistle, and later book, Three Dollar Dreams. The success of these early works garnered Bowen several major literary awards and cultural grants.

Bowen continues to write in the popular history genre, and to date has written seven books, several magazine articles, and penned a monthly newspaper column entitled "Those Island People" in Victoria's Times Colonist (2003–2005), inspired by her years of collecting and chronicling stories and interviews with people on Vancouver Island. From 1993 to 2006, she became Co-Chair of the Maclean Hunter Chair of Creative Nonfiction Writing at the University of British Columbia (later known as the Rogers Communications Chair of Creative Nonfiction Writing), a position she held until 2006.

In 2011, she was in a serious car accident that broke her legs, pelvis, wrist and sternum.

The City of Nanaimo awarded her with the City of Nanaimo Excellence in Culture Award in 2000.

In 2018, Bowen donated her complete archives to Vancouver Island University Library's Special Collections & Archives.

== Books ==
- Boss Whistle: The Coal Miners of Vancouver Island Remember, 1982
- Three Dollar Dreams, 1987
- Muddling Through: The Remarkable Story of the Barr Colonists, 1992
- Those Lake People: Stories of Cowichan Lake, 1995
- Robert Dunsmuir: Laird of the Mines, 1999
- Whoever Gives Us Bread: The Story of Italians in British Columbia, 2011
- Those Island People, 2014

== Awards ==
- F.G. Bressani Literary Prize in Creative Nonfiction (Bressani Award), Winner, 2012
- British Columbia Genealogical Society Family History Book Award, Honourable Mention, 2011
- City of Vancouver Book Award, Shortlist, 2011
- Certificate of Honour, British Columbia Historical Federation Writing Competition, 2000
- Distinguished Alumni Award, Concordia University College of Alberta (now Concordia University of Edmonton), 2000
- City of Nanaimo, Excellence in Culture Award, 1999
- Canadian Historical Association Regional Certificate of Merit, Prairies/Northwest Territories, 1992
- Hubert Evans Non-Fiction Prize, BC Book Prizes, 1992
- Canada Council Non-Fiction Writing Grant, 1989
- Canada Council Non-Fiction Writing Grant, 1985
- Roderick Haig-Brown Regional Prize, Shortlist, 1987
- Lieutenant-Governor's Medal for Writing British Columbia History, 1987 (Lieutenant Governor's Award for Literary Excellence)
- Canadian Historical Association Regional Certificate of Merit, British Columbia, 1983
- Eaton's British Columbia Book Award, 1983
- Canada Council Explorations Grant, 1981
