= Betty Keller =

Canadian author

Betty Keller (born 4 November 1930) is a Canadian author who has written eleven books and co-written four books since 1974. For her works, Keller primarily wrote books about drama and biographies. Her biographical works were on Pauline Johnson, Ernest Thompson Seton and Bertrand Sinclair. Leading up to 2004, additional subjects that Keller wrote about included salmon farming and tugboats.

Outside of writing, Keller taught drama to schoolchildren between 1963 and 1974. As an academic in Canada until 1985, she worked at Simon Fraser University and the University of British Columbia. During this time period, she spent a year in Gongola at Women's Teacher College. After creating the Sunshine Coast Festival of the Written Arts in 1983, she remained with the festival until 1994. Her honours include the Queen Elizabeth II's Golden Jubilee Medal in 2002 and the Lieutenant Governor's Award for Literary Excellence in 2017.

== Early life and education ==
Keller was born on 4 November 1930 in Vancouver. As a child with four siblings, she was in Burnaby before she lived on a Langley farm. During the 1960s, Keller studied teaching and received a Bachelor of Arts while at the University of British Columbia.

== Career ==
=== Drama and academic career ===
In 1963, Keller began her teaching career. For her drama experience, Keller worked for A. D. Rundle Junior Secondary in 1968. She was an English teacher at David Thompson Secondary School the following year while also continuing to work in drama. In 1974, she was at Windsor Secondary School.

Throughout the remainder of the 1970s, Keller primarily worked in education at Simon Fraser University and spent a year in Gongola with Women's Teachers College. During 1980, she was hired by the University of British Columbia. Up to 1985, she was a sessional lecturer in creative writing.

For her theatrical career, Keller co-directed Gilliam in 1968 for The Chilliwack Players Guild. During the late 1960s, she acted in The Elves and the Shoemaker for the Metro Theatre and Hay Fever for the Richmond Arts Centre. In the early 1970s, she was in A Gown for His Mistress at the West Vancouver Little Theatre and A Man for All Seasons at the Vancouver Little Theatre.

=== Publications ===
During her teaching career, Keller released Trick Doors and Other Dramatic Sketches in 1974. The following year, both Taking Off: A Practical Handbook for Teachers of Creative Drama and Opening Trick Doors: a Guide to the Use and Production of the Sketches in Trick Doors were made available. During 1988, Improvisation in Creative Drama: A Program of Workshops and Dramatic Sketches for Students was published.

For her biographies, Pauline: A Biography of Pauline Johnson was published by Keller during 1981. For additional biographies, Black Wolf: The Life of Ernest Thompson Seton came out in 1984. During 1999, Pauline Johnson: First Aboriginal Voice of Canada was released by Keller as a children's biography. The following year, Pender Harbour Cowboy: The Many Lives of Bertrand Sinclair was made available.

During 1986, Keller expanded her topics with On the Shady Side: Vancouver 1886-1914. In 2010, Keller released A Thoroughly Wicked Woman: Murder, Perjury and Trial by Newspaper. Her book was a fictionalized version of Thomas Jackson's 1905 murder. Her 2001 book, Better the Devil You Know was a fictional work about "a con man who passes himself off as an evangelical preacher" during 1907. As a co-writer, Keller was part of Bright Seas, Pioneer Coasts: The Sunshine Coast and Sea Silver: Inside British Columbia's Salmon Farming Industry during 1996. Additional co-written books were Skookum Tugs: British Columbia's Working Tugboats in 2002 and A Stain Upon the Sea: West Coast Salmon Farming in 2004.

For Legends of the New People, she was the editor of the 1976 posthumous book by Norman Lerman. During the late 1990s, Keller posthumously completed Eileen Williston's memoir on Ray Williston as an editor. Their book, Forests, Power and Policy: The Legacy of Ray Williston, was released in 1997.

=== Additional positions ===
In 1983, Keller co-created the Suncoast Writers' Forge. That year, she started the Sunshine Coast Festival of the Written Arts while living in Sechelt Inlet. With the festival, she was their coordinator during 1986. Keller continued to work at the festival before leaving in 1994.

== Writing process and reception ==
While taking five years to complete her Pauline Johnson book, Keller used microfilm as part of her research. For her Ernest Thompson Seton book, she received funding from the Canada Council during 1984. In Patricia Morley's review for The Ottawa Citizen, Morley wrote that Keller viewed "[Seton's] version of his father's villainy [as] paranoia and delusion." With her Bertrand Sinclair biography, Keller went to the University of British Columbia Library for research.

== Honours and personal life ==
At the BC Book Prizes, Keller was a co-winner of the 2003 Bill Duthie Booksellers' Choice Award for Skookum Tugs. With A Stain Upon the Sea, she was a co-recipient of the Roderick Haig-Brown Regional Prize during 2005. During 2015, she received the Lieutenant Governor's Award for Literary Excellence. Additional British Columbia awards for Keller were the Gray Campbell Distinguished Service Award in 2017 and the George Woodcock Lifetime Achievement Award in 2021. For Canadian honours, Keller received a Lescarbot Award in 1992. During 2002, she was given the Queen Elizabeth II's Golden Jubilee Medal. She had two kids during a previous marriage.
