= Claudia Maria Cornwall =

Canadian writer and journalist

- Born: Claudia Maria Wiener; 1948 (age 77–78); Shanghai, China
- Education: University of Calgary (Ph.D.)
- Occupations: Writer and journalist
- Years active: 1975–present
- Notable work: Letter from Vienna: A Daughter Uncovers her Family's Jewish Past
- Spouse: Gordon Cornwall
- Awards: Hubert Evans Non-Fiction Prize
- Website: official website

Claudia Maria Cornwall (born Claudia Maria Wiener, 1948 in Shanghai, China) is a Canadian writer and journalist. Her second non-fiction book, the autobiographical Letter from Vienna: A Daughter Uncovers her Family's Jewish Past won the 1996 Hubert Evans Non-Fiction Prize.

== Biography ==
Claudia Maria Cornwall was born in Shanghai in 1948 as Claudia Maria Wiener and immigrated to Canada in 1949 with her parents, where she was baptized in the Anglican Church. She grew up in Vancouver, British Columbia and studied philosophy at the University of British Columbia and the University of Calgary. There she completed her Ph.D. with the thesis The evolution of persons (1975).

She worked as a freelance journalist and writer, publishing in The Globe and Mail, Reader's Digest (in the Canadian, International, and Chinese editions), BC Business, and online magazine The Tyee. Her first book, Print-Outs: The Adventures of a Rebel Computer (1982), was a fantasy story for children and adolescents.

For a long time, her parents withheld information about her family history in Austria. A letter to an uncle in Vienna, in which she asked for a picture of her father, Walter Wiener, as a youth, revealed the further truth. Her grandmother had died in a concentration camp and her parents were of Jewish origin. In the following years, she collected the letters within her family, the official papers, the pocket diary of her grandfather, Willy Frensdorff, and undertook research trips to Germany and Austria to interview and reunite the remaining family members. On the basis of this work, Cornwall wrote the critically acclaimed and internationally accepted book Letter from Vienna: A Daughter Uncovers her Family's Jewish Past (1995). It won the Hubert Evans Non-Fiction Prize in 1996.

In March 2009, Cornwall received a $20,000 grant from the Canadian Institutes of Health Research to support its series on health care and research. This series culminated in their sixth book project, Catching Cancer: the quest for its viral and bacterial causes, which was released in March 2013.

In the years that followed, Cornwall focused her publications on biographies of artists from around Vancouver. This includes her 2011 biography of the late Curtis Earle Lang, a photographer and businessman with a Beatnik background, who had a twelve-year friendship with her husband. Cornwall also enlisted the technical skills of her brother, Greg, for the processing of Lang's photographic legacy. This book was well received by literary critics and nominated for the 2012 City of Vancouver Book Award.

Cornwall gives seminars on creative writing of memoirs at Simon Fraser University and Douglas College in British Columbia.

The writer is married to Gordon Cornwall, and has a daughter and a son who work at a university.

== Works ==
- Cornwall, Claudia Maria (1982). Print-outs: The adventures of a rebel computer. Vancouver, BC: Nerve Press. ISBN 9780919325005.
- Cornwall, Claudia Maria (1995). Letter from Vienna: A Daughter Uncovers her Family's Jewish Past'. Vancouver: Douglas & McIntyre. ISBN 1-55054-115-3.
- Lazarus, Eve; Cornwall, Claudia Maria; Newbold Patterson, Wendy (2009). The life and art of Frank Molnar, Jack Hardman, LeRoy Jensen. Salt Spring Island, BC: Mother Tongue Publishing. ISBN 978-1-896949-02-4.
- Cornwall, Claudia Maria (2011). At the World's Edge: Curt Lang's Vancouver, 1937–1998. Salt Spring Island, BC: Mother Tongue Publishing. ISBN 978-1-896949-17-8.
- Cornwall, Claudia Maria (2013). Catching cancer: the quest for its viral and bacterial causes. Lanham: Rowman & Littlefield Publishers. ISBN 978-1-4422-1522-1.
- Cornwall, Claudia Maria (2016). Battling Melanoma: One Couple's Struggle from Diagnosis to Cure. Rowman & Littlefield. ISBN 978-1442245150.

== Awards and nominations ==
- 1996 Hubert Evans Non-Fiction Prize for Letter from Vienna
- 2009 Award of the Canadian Institutes of Health Research
- 2012 Shortlist for the City of Vancouver Book Award for At the World's Edge
