= Tsering Yangzom Lama =

Tibetan novelist

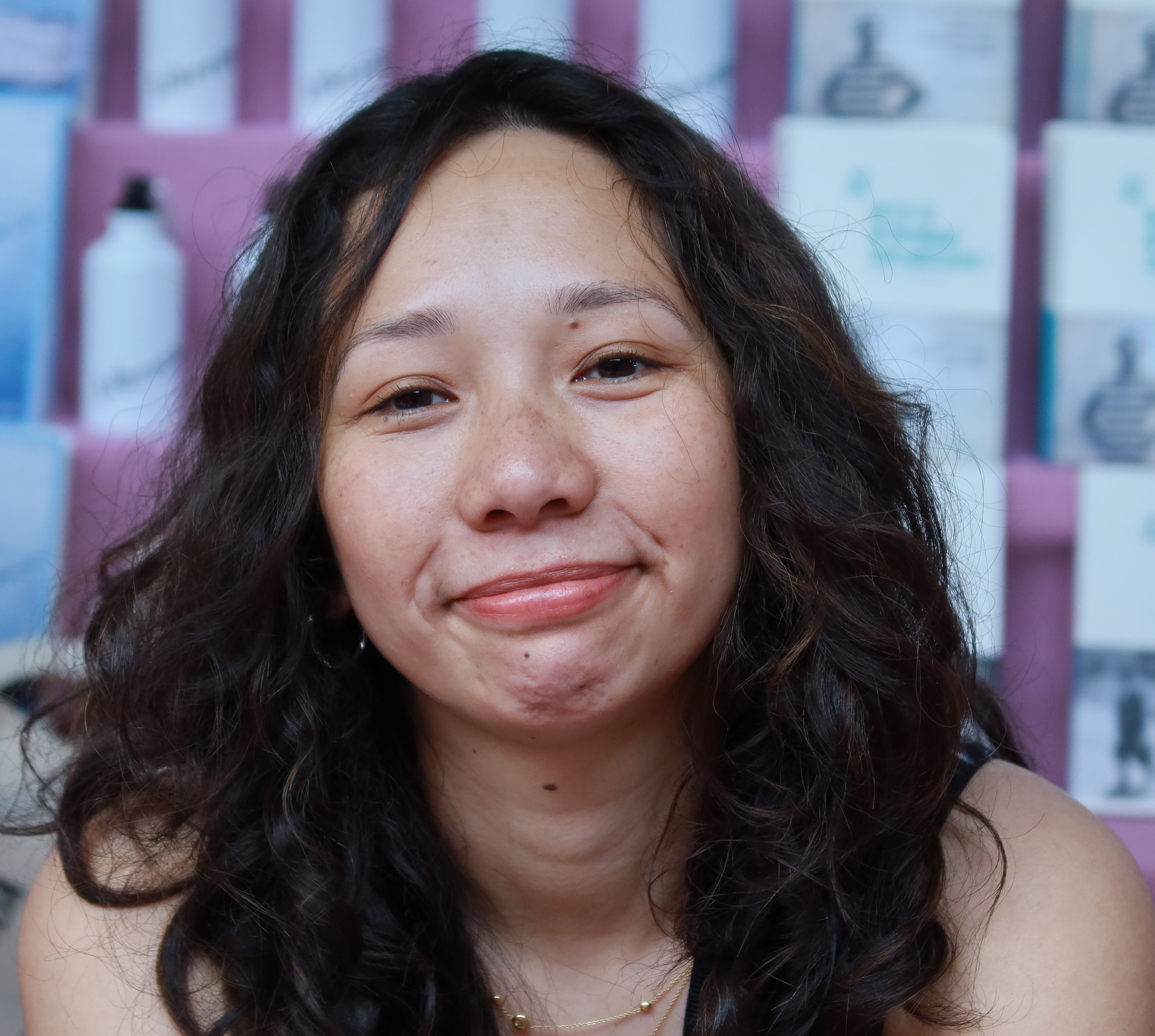
Tsering Yangzom Lama

Tsering Yangzom Lama is a Tibetan writer based in Vancouver, British Columbia, whose debut novel We Measure the Earth with Our Bodies was published in 2022. She was born and raised in a Tibetan refugee community in Nepal before immigrating to Canada and then the United States.

Lama received a Bachelor of Arts in creative writing and international relations from the University of British Columbia , and an MFA in writing from Columbia University. She has been a resident at the Banff Centre for Arts and Creativity, the Virginia Center for the Creative Arts, and the Vermont Studio Center. She was a 2018 Tin House Scholar.

We Measure the Earth with Our Bodies, inspired in part by Lama's own experiences, tells the story of a Tibetan family's journey into exile over the course of 50 years and three generations. The novel was shortlisted for the 2022 Giller Prize, and longlisted for the Center for Fiction First Novel Prize, the Jim Deva Prize for Writing that Provokes, and the inaugural Carol Shields Prize for Fiction in 2023. The novel was awarded the Great Lakes College Association New Writers Award for Fiction.
