= Richard Bocking =

Canadian filmmaker (1931–2012)

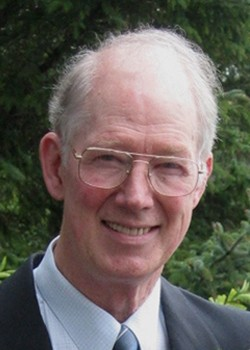
- Richard C Bocking
- Born: March 21, 1931; Port Arthur, Ontario, Canada
- Died: September 28, 2012 (aged 81); Victoria, British Columbia, Canada
- Spouse: Winnifred Bocking (1953–2012)
- Website: http://web.mac.com/richardbocking/

Richard Charles Bocking (March 21, 1931 – September 28, 2012) was a Canadian filmmaker whose documentaries on the environment and the performing arts aired on Canadian and European network television for over forty years.

== Biography ==
Born in Port Arthur (now Thunder Bay), Ontario, Bocking graduated from the University of Manitoba as an agricultural economist and was employed in that field by the Alberta government for seven years. His work then took him into broadcasting when the Canadian Broadcasting Corporation (CBC) invited him to help produce farm-related programs for radio and television. His broadcasting interests developed to include performing arts and environmental and resource issues.

He was transferred to Vancouver to take on the role of television producer. He has since produced over 60 films. Some of those feature documentaries, produced in Canada and abroad, include: Tristan und Isolde (1976), The Music of Man (1979), Vivaldi (1986), which was filmed in Venice and Montreal and awarded the Prix Anik, for best music program on CBC television in 1987, Jon Vickers: A Man and His Music (1975), Canada To-morrow (1973), showcasing the development policies of Canada, and Canada's Water: For Sale? (1972), which studied the issue of exporting Canada's water to the United States. Canada's Water: For Sale was also a book published in 1972. Bocking donated copies of his documentary films to universities, which are available to students and faculty through the Audio Visual department.

In 1997, Bocking published Mighty River: A Portrait Of The Fraser, for which he won the Roderick Haig-Brown Prize, in addition to being nominated for the Hubert Evans Non-Fiction Prize in 1998 and awarded a certificate of merit by the B.C. Historical Federation. In 2001, he was made the Trent University Ashley Fellow for 2001/2002.

He lived and worked in Edmonton, Vancouver, Quebec City, Rome, Toronto, and Montreal. He and his wife Winnifred lived in Victoria, British Columbia.
