= Arno Kopecky =

Canadian journalist and travel writer

- Occupations: journalist, non-fiction
- Writing career
- Period: 2010s-present
- Notable works: The Oil Man and the Sea: Navigating the Northern Gateway

Arno Kopecky is a Canadian journalist and travel writer. His book The Oil Man and the Sea: Navigating the Northern Gateway won the 2014 Edna Staebler Award, and was shortlisted for the 2014 Hubert Evans Non-Fiction Prize and the Governor General's Award for English-language non-fiction at the 2014 Governor General's Awards.

In addition to his books, Kopecky has also been published in newspapers and magazines including The Globe and Mail, The Walrus, Reader's Digest, Maclean's, The Tyee and Foreign Policy. He lives in Vancouver, British Columbia.

== Works ==
- The Devil's Curve: A Journey into Power and Profit at the Amazon's Edge (2012, ISBN 978-1553658979)
- The Oil Man and the Sea: Navigating the Northern Gateway (2014, ISBN 978-1771001076)
- The Environmentalist’s Dilemma: Promise and Peril in an Age of Climate Crisis (2021, ISBN 978-1770416093)
