= Jim Deva Prize for Writing that Provokes =

Canadian literary award

The Jim Deva Prize for Writing That Provokes is a Canadian literary award, presented annually as part of the BC and Yukon Book Prizes. Named in memory of Jim Deva, a founder of the Little Sister's Book and Art Emporium bookstore in Vancouver, following a donation from his partner Bruce Smyth, the prize honours literature in any genre that "challenges or provokes the ideas and forces that shape what writing, art, and/or society can become".

The award's creation was announced in 2019, and it was presented for the first time in 2020.

== Winners and nominees ==
Prize winners and finalists
| Year | Author | Title | Result | Ref. |
|---|---|---|---|---|
| 2020 | Ivan Coyote | Rebent Sinner | Winner | |
| 2020 | Francine Cunningham | on/me | Shortlist | |
| 2020 | Chantal Gibson | How She Read | Shortlist | |
| 2020 | Hazel Jane Plante | Little Blue Encyclopedia (For Vivian) | Shortlist | |
| 2020 | Yasuko Thanh | Mistakes to Run With | Shortlist | |
| 2021 | Joel Bakan | The New Corporation: How 'Good' Corporations Are Bad for Democracy | Winner | |
| 2021 | Billy-Ray Belcourt | A History of My Brief Body | Shortlist | |
| 2021 | Amber Dawn | My Art Is Killing Me | Shortlist | |
| 2021 | Michelle Good | Five Little Indians | Shortlist | |
| 2021 | Benjamin Perrin | Overdose: Heartbreak and Hope in Canada's Opioid Crisis | Shortlist | |
| 2022 | Harsha Walia | Border and Rule: Global Migration, Capitalism, and the Rise of Racist Nationalism | Winner | |
| 2022 | Nicola I. Campbell | Spíləx̣m: A Weaving of Recovery, Resilience and Resurgence | Shortlist | |
| 2022 | Danielle Geller | Dog Flowers | Shortlist | |
| 2022 | Darrel J. McLeod | Peyakow | Shortlist | |
| 2022 | Catherine Nolin, Grahame Russell | Testimonio: Canadian Mining in the Aftermath of Genocides in Guatemala | Shortlist | |
| 2023 | Michael J. Hathaway | What a Mushroom Lives For: Matsutake and the Worlds They Make | Winner | |
| 2023 | Otoniya J. Okot Bitek | A Is for Acholi | Shortlist | |
| 2023 | Tsering Yangzom Lama | We Measure the Earth with Our Bodies | Shortlist | |
| 2023 | Harrison Mooney | Invisible Boy: A Memoir of Self-Discovery | Shortlist | |
| 2023 | Y-Dang Troeung | Refugee Lifeworlds: The Afterlife of the Cold War in Cambodia | Shortlist | |
| 2024 | Helen Knott | Becoming a Matriarch | Winner | |
| 2024 | Angela Sterritt | Unbroken: My Fight for Survival, Hope, and Justice for Indigenous Women and Girls | Shortlist | |
| 2024 | Y-Dang Troeung | Landbridge: Life in Fragments | Shortlist | |
| 2024 | Lindsay Wong | Tell Me Pleasant Things About Immortality | Shortlist | |
| 2024 | Michael Nicoll Yahgulanaas | JAJ: A Haida Manga | Shortlist | |
| 2025 | Sarah Leavitt | Something, Not Nothing: A Story of Grief and Love | Winner | |
| 2025 | Carleigh Baker | Last Woman | Shortlist | |
| 2025 | Billy-Ray Belcourt | Coexistence | Shortlist | |
| 2025 | Christopher Cheung | Under the White Gaze: Solving the Problem of Race and Representation in Canadian Journalism | Shortlist | |
| 2025 | Loghan Paylor | The Cure for Drowning | Shortlist | |
| 2026 | L. E. Fox | This Book Is a Knife: Radical Working-Class Strategies in the Age of Climate Change | Winner | |
| 2026 | Ruby Smith Díaz | Searching for Serafim: The Life and Legacy of Serafim “Joe” Fortes | Shortlist | |
| 2026 | Kawika Guillermo | Of Floating Isles: On Growing Pains and Video Games | Shortlist | |
| 2026 | Tracey Lindberg, George Littlechild | The Cree Word for Love: Sâkihitowin | Shortlist | |
| 2026 | Jen Sookfong Lee | The Hunger We Pass Down | Shortlist | |
