= Heather Pringle (writer) =

Canadian freelance science writer

Heather Pringle is a Canadian freelance science writer who mostly writes about archaeology. Before becoming a writer, Pringle worked as a museum researcher and book editor. Her 2006 book The Master Plan detailed Heinrich Himmler's establishment of the Ahnenerbe in a pseudo-scientific attempt to manufacture evidence and "prove" Aryan superiority. It won the Hubert Evans Non-Fiction Prize. Her previous work includes The Mummy Congress, as well as articles for National Geographic and Archaeology magazine. Pringle is emeritus editor at Hakai Magazine and has been awarded a Canadian National Magazine Award and an AAAS Kavli Science Journalism Award from the American Association for the Advancement of Science and the Kavli Foundation.
