= A History of My Brief Body =

2020 memoir by Billy-Ray Belcourt

- Author: Billy-Ray Belcourt
- Language: English
- Genre: Autobiography, Essay
- Publisher: Penguin Canada
- Publication date: May 14, 2020
- Publication place: Canadian
- Media type: Print

A History of My Brief Body is an autobiographical series of essays by Billy-Ray Belcourt, published July 14, 2020, by Penguin Canada.

== Reception ==
A History of My Brief Body received starred reviews from Kirkus Reviews, and Quill & Quire, as well as positive reviews from Rabble.ca, Full Stop, Cloud Literary, The Washington Post, The Rumpus, Booklist, and The Nerd Daily.

Kirkus Reviews, CBC, The Globe and Mail, and Largehearted Boy named the book one of the best of the year, and Book Riot and The Globe and Mail included it on other reading lists.

The book also received the following accolades:

- Lambda Literary Award for Gay Memoir/Biography finalist (2021)
- Hubert Evans Non-Fiction Prize winner (2021)
- Governor General's Literary Award for Nonfiction finalist (2020)
- Jim Deva Prize for Writing that Provokes finalist (2021)
