= Stan Persky =

Canadian journalist (1941–2024)

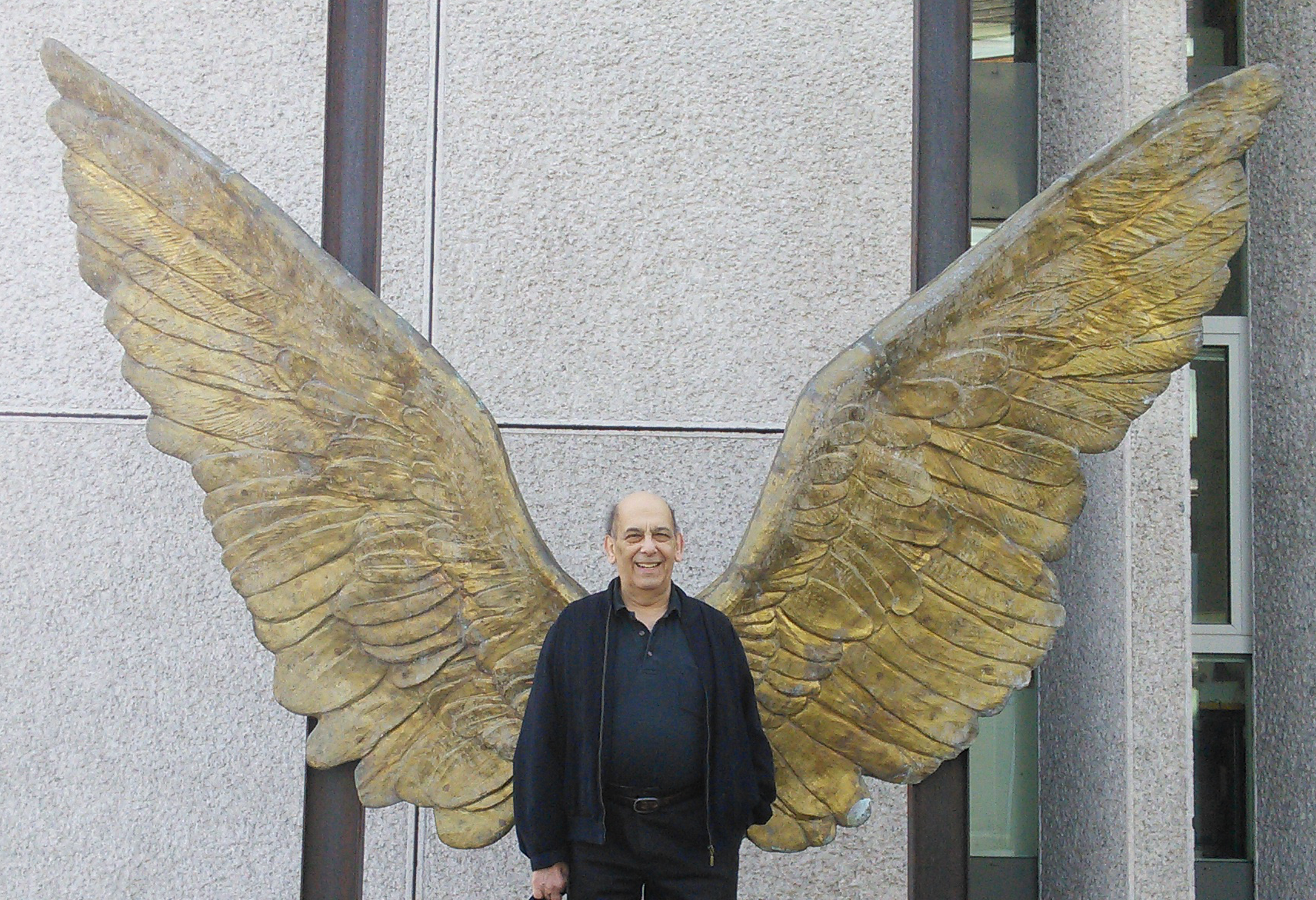
- Persky in 2014
- Born: 19 January 1941; Chicago, Illinois, U.S.
- Died: 15 October 2024 (aged 83); Berlin, Germany
- Known for: Writer, media commentator and philosophy instructor

Stan Persky (19 January 1941 – 15 October 2024) was a Canadian writer, media commentator, and philosophy instructor.

== Early life ==
Persky was born in Chicago, Illinois on 19 January 1941. As a teenager, he made contact with and received encouragement from Jack Kerouac, Allen Ginsberg and other writers of the Beat Generation. Persky served in the United States Navy, and then settled in San Francisco, California in the early 1960s, becoming part of a group of writers that included Jack Spicer, Robert Duncan, Robin Blaser and George Stanley.

== Life during university ==
In 1966, Persky moved to Vancouver, British Columbia, Canada, and attended the University of British Columbia, receiving degrees in anthropology and sociology. He studied with anthropologist Michael Kew, political philosopher Bob Rowan, and sociologist Roy Turner, and briefly studied as a graduate student with Rowan's teacher, political philosopher Joseph Tussman in the Experimental Program at the University of California, Berkeley. He became a Canadian citizen in 1972. During the 1960s and '70s, he was prominent as a student and civic activist, was an early staff member of the Georgia Straight, a free alternative newspaper, and co-founder with Dennis Wheeler of the "Georgia Straight Writing Supplement", which eventually became New Star Books.

== Career after university ==
After university, Persky worked at Vancouver Mental Patients Association and the Canadian Broadcasting Corporation before becoming a college instructor in the sociology department at Northwest Community College in Terrace, British Columbia. He subsequently taught briefly at Malaspina College in Nanaimo, and Simon Fraser University in Burnaby. From 1983 to 2016, he was a professor at Capilano University in North Vancouver, first in political studies and then in philosophy. Since 1990, Persky has resided part-time in Vancouver and in Berlin, Germany.

He was the author or editor of some 20 books and worked as a media commentator for the CBC, a literary columnist for The Globe and Mail and The Vancouver Sun, and wrote for The Body Politic, This Magazine, New Directions, Saturday Night, Sodomite Invasion Review, Books in Canada and most recently The Tyee. He was also a frequent contributor to Dooney's Cafe. Stan Persky was a long-time Vancouver public intellectual and literary activist. His later publications included Reading the 21st Century: Books of the Decade, 2000–2009 (Montreal and Kingston: McGill-Queen's, 2011), Post-Communist Stories: About Cities, Politics, Desires (Toronto: Cormorant, 2014) and Letter from Berlin: Essays 2015-2016 (Toronto: Dooney's, 2017).

== Death ==
Persky died in Berlin on 15 October 2024, at the age of 83.

== Awards ==
- Hubert Evans Non-Fiction Prize – 1990 (nomination)
- Hubert Evans Non-Fiction Prize – 2006 (winner)
- Lieutenant Governor's Award for Literary Excellence – 2010

== Bibliography ==
- Lives of the French Symbolist Poets (San Francisco: White Rabbit Press, 1967)
- Wrestling the Angel (Vancouver: Talonbooks, 1977)
- Son of Socred (Vancouver: New Star Books, 1979)
- The House That Jack Built (Vancouver: New Star Books, 1980)
- At the Lenin Shipyard: Poland and the Rise of the Solidarity Trade Union (Vancouver: New Star Books, 1981)
- The Solidarity Sourcebook (Vancouver: New Star Books, 1982; edited with Henry Flam)
- Flaunting It: A Decade of Gay Journalism from The Body Politic (Vancouver: New Star Books, 1982; edited with Ed Jackson)
- Bennett II (Vancouver: New Star Books, 1983)
- America, the Last Domino: U.S. Foreign Policy in Central America Under Reagan (Vancouver: New Star Books, 1984)
- The Supreme Court of Canada Decision on Abortion (Vancouver: New Star Books, 1988; edited with Shelagh Day)
- Fantasy Government: Bill Vander Zalm and the Future of Social Credit (Vancouver: New Star Books, 1989)
- Buddy's: Meditations on Desire (Vancouver: New Star Books, 1989; 1991)
- Mixed Media, Mixed Messages (Vancouver: New Star Books, 1991)
- Then We Take Berlin: Stories from the Other Side of Europe (Toronto: Knopf Canada, 1995; Toronto: Vintage Canada, 1996); U.S. title: Boyopolis: Sex And Politics In Gay Eastern Europe (Woodstock, N.Y.: Overlook, 1996))
- Autobiography of a Tattoo (Vancouver: New Star Books, 1997)
- Delgamuukw: The Supreme Court of Canada Decision on Aboriginal Title (Vancouver: David Suzuki Foundation and Greystone, 1998; edited with commentary)
- On Kiddie Porn: Sexual Representation, Free Speech and the Robin Sharpe Case (Vancouver: New Star Books, 2001; with John Dixon)
- The Short Version: An ABC Book (Vancouver: New Star Books, 2005)
- Topic Sentence: A Writer's Education (Vancouver: New Star Books, 2007)
- Robin Blaser (Vancouver: New Star Books, 2010; with Brian Fawcett)
- Reading the 21st Century: Books of the Decade, 2000–2009 (Montreal and Kingston: McGill-Queen's, 2011)
- Post-Communist Stories: About Cities, Politics, Desires (Toronto: Cormorant, 2014)
- Letter from Berlin: Essays 2015-2016 (Toronto: Dooney's, 2017)
- Thomas Marquard and Brian Fawcett (eds.), Let's Keep Doing This: Writings in Honour of Stan Persky (Toronto: Dooney's, 2018)
