= Borealis Prize: The Commissioner of Yukon Award for Literary Contribution =

The Borealis Prize: The Commissioner of Yukon Award for Literary Contribution was established in 2020 to recognize the lifetime achievement of an individual's contributions to the Yukon writing and publishing community.

== History ==
The Borealis Prize is administered by the BC and Yukon Book Prizes and awarded annually by the Commissioner of Yukon. It will be presented at the Dawson Daily News Print and Publishing Festival in Dawson City, Yukon which takes place each year in late Spring.

The prize is open to nominations of authors as well as others such as volunteers who work with or in the literary community. The recipient receives a cash award, a certificate and an original art piece.

== Winners ==
- 2020 - Patti Flather, Leonard Linklater
- 2021 - Joanna Lilley
- 2022 - Tara Borin
- 2023 - Katherine Munro
- 2024 - Lhù'áán Mân Ye Shäw
- 2025 - Linda Johnson
- 2026 - Dan Dowhal
