= Andreas Schroeder =

German-born Canadian writer

- Born: 26 November 1946 (age 79); Hoheneggelsen, West Germany
- Spouse: Sharon Brown

Andreas Schroeder (b. Hoheneggelsen, West Germany 26 November 1946) is a German-born Canadian poet, novelist, and nonfiction writer who lives in the small town of Roberts Creek, British Columbia.

== Career ==
Schroeder is the author of some 23 books, including fiction, creative nonfiction, poetry, translations and criticism. For many years he appeared on the CBC radio show Basic Black as its "resident crookologist", presenting a segment on some of the world's most outrageous and humorous crimes and criminals.

He served a term as Chair of the Writers' Union of Canada (1976/77), at which time he took over the Union's crusade for Public Lending Right. When that program was finally achieved, in 1986, he became its founding chair, and served as the Union's PLR representative on the Public Lending Right Commission until 2008.

Schroeder teaches Creative Non-Fiction in the University of British Columbia's Creative Writing program, where he holds the Rogers Communications Chair in Creative Nonfiction.

Schroeder has been shortlisted for a Governor-General's Award (Nonfiction: Shaking It Rough) in 1977, the Sealbooks First Novel Award (1984), an Arthur Ellis Award for Best Nonfiction (1997), The Stephen Leacock Award for Humor (1997) and the Malahat Review Novella competition (1998). He has won the OLA's Red Maple Award for Young Adult Nonfiction twice (2005; 2007), has received several National Magazine Awards, and won the Canadian Association of Journalists' "Best Investigative Journalism" award in 1990. He is a member of the New Democratic Party and describes himself as a "non-observant Mennonite".

He is married to Sharon Brown; the couple have two daughters.

== Works ==
=== Poetry ===
- The Ozone Minotaur – 1969
- File of Uncertainties – 1971
- Universe: The Burden of Performance is on the Rider – 1977

=== Nonfiction ===
- Shaking it Rough: A Prison Memoir – 1976
- The Mennonites: A Pictorial History of their Lives in Canada – 1990
- Carved From Wood – A History of Mission, BC. – 1991
- Scams, Scandals, and Skulduggery – 1996
- Cheats, Charlatans, and Chicanery – 1997
- Fakes, Frauds, and Flimflammery – 1999
- Scams! (Young Adult Nonfiction) – 2004
- Thieves! (Young Adult Nonfiction) – 2005
  - Auf der Flucht mit Mona Lisa. Von Meisterdieben und charmanten Schwindlern.. Transl. Walter Goidinger. Droemer Knaur, Munich 1998
- Duped! (Young Adult Nonfiction – 2011
- Robbers! (Young Adult Nonfiction) – 2012

=== Fiction ===
- The Late Man – 1972
- Toccata in 'D': A Micro Novel – 1984
- Dust-Ship Glory – 1976
- The Eleventh Commandment – 1990
- Renovating Heaven – 2008
