= Jack Hodgins =

Canadian novelist and short story writer

Jack Hodgins (born October 3, 1938 in Comox Valley, British Columbia) is a Canadian novelist and short story writer. Critically acclaimed, among his best received works is Broken Ground (1998), a historical novel set after the First World War, for which he received the Ethel Wilson Fiction Prize and many other accolades.

== Biography ==
Jack Hodgins grew up in Merville, a small town in the Comox Valley of British Columbia. He left home for Vancouver, where he attended the University of British Columbia, and was encouraged by Earle Birney, graduating with a bachelor's degree in Education. Hodgins spent the next 18 years of his career teaching English in Nanaimo, back on Vancouver Island.

In 1968, his first piece of literary work was accepted by a publication, and the exposure allowed him the chance to expand his work in print. With the publication of his first book of short stories, "Spit Delaney's Island" (1976), and his first novel "The Invention of the World" (1977), Hodgins was well on his way to becoming a recognized name in Canadian literature, before taking a position in the Creative Writing Department at the University of Victoria.

Hodgins went on to hold short-term teaching positions at universities throughout Canada, including Simon Fraser University and the University of Ottawa. He lectured in countries such as Japan, Finland, Norway, Germany, Spain, and Australia. In 1983, he accepted a position as a professor of Creative Writing at the University of Victoria. He and his family settled themselves in Victoria and stayed through until the time of his retirement from teaching, in 2002.

Hodgins continues his life in Victoria today and occasionally gives lectures on writing and annual talks at a workshop in Mallorca, Spain. Hodgins has received much recognition for his work including the Eaton's BC Book Award for "Spit Delaney's Island," the Lieutenant Governor's Award for Literary Excellence in 2006, and the Terasen Lifetime Achievement Award. In 2001, a play based on several short stories from his book The Barclay Family Theatre was made into an opera by composer Christopher Donnison and premiered on stage in Victoria, BC. His life has been commemorated in a National Film Board film entitled Jack Hodgins' Island.

== Literature and the environment ==
Hodgins' close relationship with the environment stems from his personal experiences within the temperate rainforests and seasides of British Columbia. Places like Comox Valley, Nanaimo, and Victoria, as well as his travels abroad, have influenced his writing and the contents of his books. His characters in Innocent Cities are based on actual residents of the city of Victoria in the late 1800s, as well as people he met during his travels to Australia. The Invention of the World is based on the legendary cult leader Brother Twelve and his followers from outside Nanaimo, BC. The Macken Charm, set in 1956, illustrates the Comox Valley through characters inspired by influential people in his life. He based the many settings in "Spit Delaney's Island" on places he has lived in or previously travelled to.

In an email interview with students from the University of Victoria, Hodgins elaborated on how place affects his writing and used The Macken Charm as his example:

"In The Macken Charm the family gathers (after a family funeral) at the site of a burnt hotel owned by the family. This place exists still. My own memories go back to playing as a child in that hotel when it was no longer in use. I knew that my parents began their married life in that hotel—the old uncle who owned it asked them to move in and look after it and them. My mother learned to cook on a stove big enough for a hotel dining room full of guests! All of this is in the novel, pretty well just as it happens, though the characters are fictitious replacements for the originals. The beach, the trees, the roads, the cars of 1956, the store, the funeral parlour, the bridge over the river in Courtenay, the glacier—they're all there. The story is fiction but the place is real."

== Awards and honours ==
- 1973 "After the Season": the President's Medal, University of Western Ontario
- 1977 Spit Delaney's Island: the Eaton's B.C. Book Award
- 1977 Spit Delaney's Island: short listed for the Governor General's Award
- 1978 The Invention of the World: Gibson's First Novel Award
- 1978 The Invention of the World: shortlisted for the Books in Canada First Novel Award
- 1979 The Resurrection of Joseph Bourne: The Governor General's Literary Award for Fiction
- 1986 The Canada-Australia Prize
- 1988 The Honorary Patron: the Commonwealth Literature Prize (Canada-Caribbean region)
- 1988 The Honorary Patron: short listed for the Stephen Leacock Award for Humour
- 1995 Honorary D.Litt., University of British Columbia
- 1996 "Finding Merville": (Comox Valley Record) first place in Neville Shanks Memorial Award for Historical Writing
- 1998 Honorary D.Litt., Malaspina University-College
- 1999 Elected to the Royal Society of Canada
- 1999 Broken Ground: in Globe and Mail Top Ten
- 1999 Broken Ground: jury choice as Best Novel of the Year in Quill and Quire
- 1999 Broken Ground: The Drummer General Award (Different Drummer Bookstore)
- 2000 Broken Ground: the Ethel Wilson Prize for fiction in British Columbia
- 2000 Broken Ground: longlisted for the IMPAC/Dublin Award
- 2000 Broken Ground: the Torgi Talking Book of the Year
- 2004 Distance: longlisted for the IMPAC/Dublin Award
- 2004 Distance: shortlisted for the inaugural City of Victoria Book Award
- 2004 Honorary D.Litt, University of Victoria
- 2006 Terasen Lifetime Achievement Award "for an outstanding literary career in British Columbia"
- 2006 Lieutenant Governor's Award for Literary Excellence
- 2009 Member of the Order of Canada

== Bibliography ==
=== Novels ===
- The Invention of the World – 1977
- The Resurrection of Joseph Bourne – 1979 (winner of the Governor General's Award for English Language Fiction)
- The Honorary Patron – 1987
- Innocent Cities – 1990
- The Macken Charm – 1995
- Broken Ground – 1998 (winner of the 1999 Ethel Wilson Fiction Prize)
- Distance – 2004
- The Master of Happy Endings - 2010 (finalist for the Ethel Wilson Fiction Prize)

=== Short stories ===
- Spit Delaney's Island –1976 (winner of the Eaton's BC Book Award)
- "By The River"
- The Barclay Family Theatre – 1981
- Damage Done by the Storm – 2005

=== Children's literature ===
- Left Behind in Squabble Bay – 1989

=== Non-fiction ===
- Over Forty in Broken Hill – 1992
- A Passion for Narrative: A Guide for Writing Fiction – 1994

=== Periodicals ===
Short stories and articles have been published in several magazines in Canada, France, Australia, and the US, including:

- Northwest Review
- Antigonish Review
- Wascana Review
- Descant (Texas)
- Capilano Review
- Prism International
- Paris Intercontinental
- Saturday Night
- Vancouver
- Westerly
- Story
- Toronto Life
- North American Review
- Event
- Canadian Fiction Magazine
- Sound Heritage
- Alphabet
- Viva
- Journal of Canadian Fiction
- The Canadian Forum
- Forum (Houston)
- Island No.2
- Meanjin
- The Literary Half-yearly
- Overland

=== Anthologies ===
- Teaching Short Fiction, edited with Bruce Nesbitt (ComCept Publishing)
- Voice and Vision, edited with W.H. New (McClelland & Stewart)
- The Frontier Experience (Macmillan of Canada, 1975)
- The West Coast Experience (Macmillan of Canada, 1976)
- Beginnings: Samplings from a Long Apprenticeship: novels which were imagined, written, re-written, rejected, abandoned, and supplanted (Grand Union Press, 1983)
