= Hubert Evans (author) =

Canadian writer (1892–1986)

- Born: May 9, 1892; Vankleek Hill, Ontario, Canada
- Died: June 16, 1986 (aged 94); Roberts Creek, British Columbia, Canada
- Occupations: Journalist, writer
- Writing career
- Period: 20th century
- Genres: History, fiction

Hubert Reginald Evans (May 9, 1892 – June 16, 1986) was a Canadian writer. He is most noted for his 1954 novel Mist on the River, which has been described as the first Canadian novel ever to present a realistic portrait of First Nations people as its central characters.

Evans was born in Vankleek Hill, Ontario, the son of Frances Taylor and William Evans, a teacher. He was raised in Galt. He briefly worked as a journalist before enlisting in the Canadian Armed Forces during World War I, and after the war he settled at Roberts Creek, British Columbia. His first novel, The New Front Line, was published in 1927. Throughout his career, he also published poetry, short stories, theatrical and radio plays, juvenile and young adult literature, and non-fiction writing on First Nations culture and nature and conservation topics.

He is best known for his novel, Mist on the River (1954) which was based on his experience with the Gitxsan people of the Skeena valley. The book interweaves the stories of six members of the same family including the central character who will eventually become chief. The book was reissued as part of the New Canadian Library series in 1973, with a foreword by W. H. New. His final novel, O Time in Your Flight, was published in 1979, by which time Evans was nearly blind.

When the BC Book Prizes were established in 1985, the award for non-fiction was named the Hubert Evans Non-Fiction Prize in his honour. Hubert Evans: The First 93 Years, a biography of Evans by writer Alan Twigg, was published in early 1986, and Evans died, aged 94, in June of that year.

== Works ==
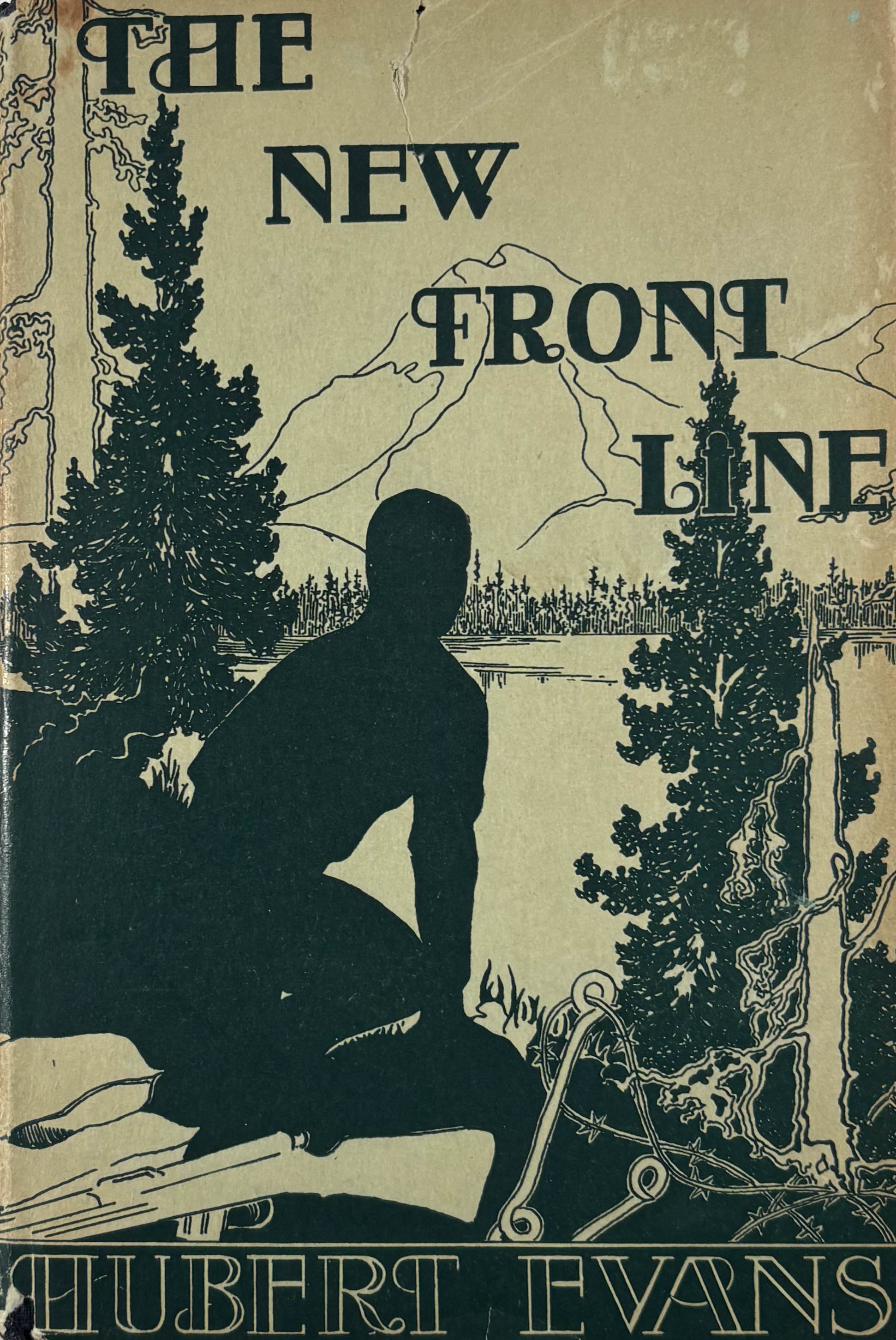
The New Front Line. Toronto: The Macmillan Company. 1927.

- Forest Friends: Stories of Animals, Fish, And Birds...Rockies (1926)
- The New Front Line (1927)
- Derry, Airedale of the Frontier (1928)
- Derry's Partner (1929)
- Derry, of Totem Creek (1930)
- The Silent Call (1930)
- The Western Wall (1932)
- No More Islands (1943)
- North to the Unknown: The Achievements...David Thompson (1949)
- Mist on the River (1954)
- Mountain Dog, a/k/a Son of the Salmon People (1956)
- Whittlings (1976)
- Endings (1978)
- O Time in Your Flight! (1979)
- Mostly Coast People (1982)
