= Rosemary Neering =

Canadian author and journalist

Rosemary Neering (born 23 December 1945 in Croydon, England) is a Canadian author and journalist, focusing on non-fiction books. At the age of two Neering moved to Canada with her parents. She worked for a number of magazines including the British Columbia Magazine. Her 1992 book Down The Road won the Hubert Evans Non-Fiction Prize.
