= Sharon Brown (writer) =

Canadian writer

Sharon Brown (born 1946) is a Canadian writer living in British Columbia.

She was born in Vancouver and lived with her family on Air Force bases in Canada, France and England. In 1993, she published Some Become Flowers, describing the experience of caring for her dying mother at her home in Mission; the book received the Hubert Evans Non-Fiction Prize. Brown and her family later moved to Roberts Creek. In 1997, she published a novel, God is a Gun.

Brown married author Andreas Schroeder; the couple have two daughters.
