= Lindsay Wong =

Canadian writer

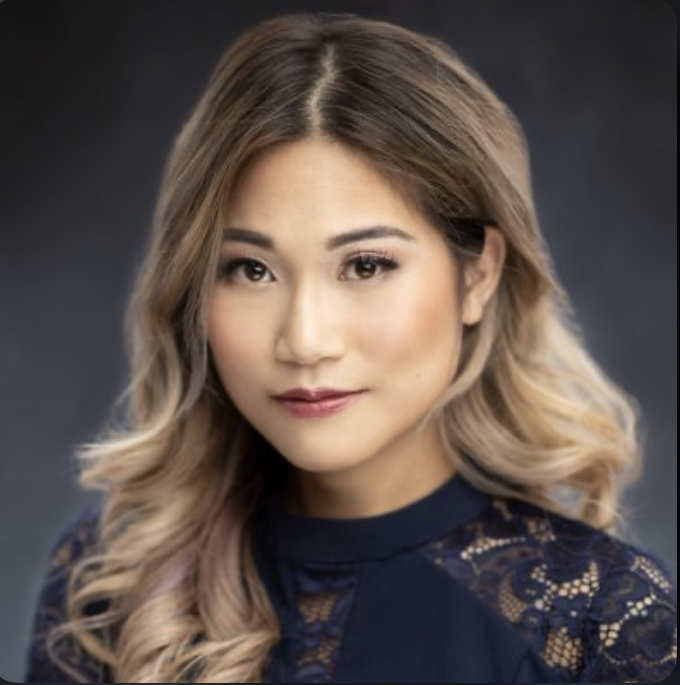
- Lindsay Wong in 2022
- Citizenship: Canadian
- Occupation: Writer
- Writing career
- Language: English
- Years active: 2018–present
- Notable works: The Woo-Woo: How I Survived Ice Hockey, Drug Raids, Demons, and My Crazy Chinese Family
- Notable awards: Hubert Evans Non-Fiction; 2019
- Website: lindsaywongwriter.com

Lindsay Wong is a Canadian writer, whose memoir The Woo-Woo: How I Survived Ice Hockey, Drug Raids, Demons, and My Crazy Chinese Family was published in 2018. The book, a humorous memoir about her Chinese Canadian family's history of mental illness, won the 2019 Hubert Evans Non-Fiction Prize and was a shortlisted finalist for the 2019 Hilary Weston Writers' Trust Prize for Nonfiction.

Originally from Vancouver, British Columbia, Wong wrote the book while pursuing graduate studies at Columbia University in New York City.

The Woo-Woo was selected for the 2019 edition of Canada Reads, where it was defended by Joe Zee, and was longlisted for the 2019 Stephen Leacock Memorial Medal for Humour.

Wong's book Tell Me Pleasant Things About Immortality: Stories came out in 2023, and was shortlisted for the Jim Deva Prize for Writing that Provokes in 2024.

== Publications ==
- The Woo-Woo: How I Survived Ice Hockey, Drug Raids, Demons, and My Crazy Chinese Family (2018)
- My Summer of Love and Misfortune (2020)
- Tell Me Pleasant Things About Immortality (2023)
- Villain Hitting for Vicious Little Nobodies (2026)
