= Colleen Brown (artist) =

Canadian artist

- Born: 1965 (age 60–61); Guelph, Canada
- Education: Simon Fraser University, Emily Carr University of Art and Design, Bard College
- Known for: sculpture, writing
- Website: https://colleenvbrown.org/

Colleen Brown (born in Guelph, 1965) is a Canadian artist and writer living and working in Vancouver, British Columbia. She is primarily known for her sculptural works which incorporate a variety of natural and industrial materials.

== Early life and education ==
Brown was born in Guelph in 1965. Her mother, Doris Brown, died in 1974 apparently from a heart attack but was later found to have been a victim of serial killer Russell Maurice Johnson, known as "The Bedroom Strangler".

== Practice ==
Brown is both an artist and a writer. Her first book If You Lie Down in a field, She Will Find You There was published in 2023 by Radiant Press and centers around memories held by Brown and her four siblings of their mother. The book also includes themes of feminism, the judicial system, and small town ecology. She is the recipient of the 2016 Emerging Artist Award from Portfolio Prize, which aims to support artists and develop the arts community in the Vancouver region. Her work is often large scale and mixed media, and takes on themes of space, materiality, and memory.

== Selected exhibitions ==
=== Group exhibitions ===
Brown has been involved in exhibitions in Vancouver and beyond. In 2002 her work was in Pour Occupation Immediate: Performative Urban Space and Architecture at the Western Front Society in collaboration with Montreal's artist-run Centre des arts actuels Skol curated by Johnathan Middleton and Daniel Ray. The show focused on "public and private space, and the sociopolitical role the body plays in inhabiting those spaces." Brown's portion of the show included a series of photographs entitled Forty Lucky Moments that were described as funny depictions with a message about money.

Also in 2017, Brown participated in the Vancouver Art Gallery's Ambivalent Pleasures, the first exhibition in a triennial series called Vancouver Special, whose goal is to offer "sustained engagement with the contemporary artists who make Vancouver a dynamic art community." The series' name comes from a cost-friendly housing style dubbed Vancouver special for its prominence in Vancouver from the 1960s-1980s. Her works in this show included the Evening Bruise series, consisting of colorful clay forms attached to incomplete picture frames and hung on the wall, recalling both painting and sculpture.

Brown was one of ten artists who participated in Emily Carr University's Ten Different Things (2017-2018), a series of projects investigating "the role of culture as a critical ingredient in the construct and vitality of the contemporary city” from the university's Living Labs research program. Brown's contribution, The Sculpture Game (2018) was a collaborative workshop in which participants worked together to make small sculptures as an analogy for city-making. Other artists included Laiwan, Holly Schmidt, and Casey Wei.

In 2024 Brown's work was featured in the show Aporia: Notes to a Medium at the Morris and Helen Belkin Art Gallery on the University of British Columbia's Vancouver campus.

=== Solo exhibitions ===
In 2017 Brown had a solo show at Unit 17 in Vancouver entitled Hang up, bend and slump, Low pressure Ohio, which includes a collection of large abstract sculptural forms. Another solo show took place in 2018, entitled, That Mountain is a Good Listener at Burrard Arts Foundation in Vancouver, which featured a selection of multimedia works inspired by landscape painting.
