= Y-Dang Troeung =

Canadian academic (1980–2022)

- 張依蘭; ទ្រឿងអ៊ីដាង
- Born: January 1980; Khao-I-Dang, Thailand
- Died: 27 November 2022 (aged 42)
- Citizenship: Canadian
- Occupations: professor, author
- Known for: Refugee Lifeworlds (2022), Landbridge (2023)

Academic background
- Education: McMaster University, PhD

Academic work
- Discipline: English language and literatures
- Sub-discipline: critical refugee studies, critical disability studies, transnational Asian studies, autotheory
- Institutions: City University of Hong Kong, University of British Columbia
- Website: y-dang.com

Y-Dang Troeung (1980–2022) was a professor and author, specializing in critical refugee studies, critical disability studies, and transnational Asian studies. Born in a Cambodian refugee camp in Thailand in 1980, Troeung moved to Canada as a baby. After completing her PhD in English and Cultural Studies at McMaster University, she was a professor at City University of Hong Kong and later University of British Columbia. She wrote Refugee Lifeworlds (2022) and Landbridge (2023), which was published after her death from pancreatic cancer.

== Biography ==
Troeung was born in January 1980. Her name comes from her birthplace, Khao-I-Dang, the refugee camp in Thailand where her family lived after surviving the bombing of Cambodia by the US, the Cambodian genocide, and the Cambodian-Vietnamese War. As part of the Private Sponsorship of Refugees Program, Troeung's family moved to Canada before her first birthday. Soon after their arrival, they were photographed with Prime Minister Pierre Trudeau. The Troeung family were resettled to Goderich, a small town in Ontario. Her parents' jobs included harvesting worms and working at a pen factory.

Troeung studied at University of Waterloo before completing her PhD in English and Cultural Studies at McMaster University in 2011. She took a position as an assistant professor at the City University of Hong Kong to facilitate her frequent personal and professional travel to Cambodia. She met her husband at a 2014 conference she organized called "Fashion in Fiction".

Beginning in 2018, she worked as an assistant professor at the Department of English Language & Literatures at the University of British Columbia, eventually progressing to associate professor. Her research interests included critical refugee studies, critical disability studies, and transnational Asian studies. She was an associate editor of the Canadian Literature journal. She also worked with refugees at the Vancouver Association for Survivors of Torture (VAST).

In 2021, she was diagnosed with pancreatic cancer. In August 2022, she published Refugee Lifeworlds. During her cancer treatment, she worked on the manuscript for Landbridge with the help of her friend Madeleine Thien and her husband. The book, a memoir, was posthumously published in 2023. Easter Epic, a short film directed by Troeung, was also released posthumously. The film intersperses scenes from a Cambodian family's life as refugees in Canada with clips from the 1987 Easter Epic hockey playoff game.

Troeung died on 27 November 2022 of pancreatic cancer. Her ashes were buried in Mountain View Cemetery in Vancouver.

"Swirling into a Field of Life: Works in Conversation with Y-Dang Troeung", a special issue of Canadian Literature, was published in 2025. Canadian academic Vinh Nguyen credited her with pioneering critical refugee studies in Canada, while American academic Jasbir Puar called her "the most brilliant theorist of debility I have encountered".

== Writing ==
=== Refugee Lifeworlds (2022) ===
Refugee Lifeworlds is autotheoretical, in that Troeung includes her personal experiences in writing about Cambodian refugees. Troeung defines lifeworlds as "registers of meaning in the wake of colonialism, war, and genocide that can account for duress without flattening out states of existence that can attend to pleasure, creativity, and the heterogeneity of life in blocked passages without idealizing or romanticizing the site of the subaltern”. She describes the aphasia of Cambodian refugees as a type of "creative language" that demonstrates the inadequacy of words. The book won the 2023 American Studies Association Shelley Fisher Fiskin prize and was an honorable mention for the 2024 Association for Asian Studies Harry J. Benda Prize.

The book was a shortlisted finalist for the Jim Deva Prize for Writing that Provokes in 2023.

=== Landbridge (2023) ===
Landbridge is a collection of short pieces of writing. It covers her family's experiences as refugees in Canada as well as her trips to Cambodia, including one where she witnessed the trial of a Khmer Rouge official. The book also includes photographs and letters to her son. In an essay, María Jesús Llarena Ascanio describes the book as being "written as a refusal to follow a system of able-bodiedness and offer an archive, however incomplete, of mute and maimed characters who bring about other ways of collective healing." The Globe and Mail included Landbridge on its list of best books of 2023.

The book was a shortlisted finalist for the Jim Deva Prize in 2024.

== Selected works ==
- “Buried History and Transpacific Pedagogy: Teaching the Vietnamese Boat People’s Hong Kong Passage.” ARIEL: A Review of International English Literature, vol. 46, nos. 1–2, 2015
- Refugee Lifeworlds: The Afterlife of the Cold War in Cambodia, Temple University Press, 2022.
- Landbridge: [life in fragments], Duke University Press, 2023.
- "Refugee Race-Ability". In The Routledge Handbook of Refugee Narratives, Routledge, 2023.
