= Curtis Earle Lang =

Canadian poet, artist, photographer, seaman, inventor and entrepreneur

Curtis Earle Lang (January 20, 1937 – December 17, 1998) was a Canadian poet, artist, photographer, seaman, inventor and entrepreneur.

== Early life ==
Curtis Earle Lang was born in Vancouver, British Columbia, Canada. When he was 15, Lang met the poet Al Purdy at a science fiction club meeting. Despite a nearly twenty-year gap in age, they became friends. Lang persuaded Purdy to join him in seeking out the novelist Malcolm Lowry who was living in a shack on a North Vancouver beach. Malcolm described the two as "wild and memorable poets" and wrote positively about Lang's poetry. Lang was already being published in Canadian literary journals. Al Purdy wrote several reminiscences of Lang and Lowry.

Lang was friends with many in Vancouver's creative community―poets Peter Trower, John Newlove, bill bissett, and Jamie Reid; artists Fred Douglas, Jock Hearne, David Marshall, and Roy Kiyooka; and musicians Gregg Simpson and Al Neil

== Career ==
=== Art ===
Under the influence of his friend, Fred Douglas, Lang took up painting. In March 1960, Douglas and Lang were part of a group show in the Vancouver Art Gallery, the Exhibition of Geometric Abstract Painting and Sculpture. In April, the same group had a showing in the New Design Gallery. Lang's sketches and poems appeared in blewointment, a literary periodical that Bill Bissett started in 1962. In 1964, Lang started a bookstore in downtown Vancouver on Pender Street. A year later, Don MacLeod bought the store and renamed it MacLeod's Books.

=== Photography ===
In the early 1970s, Lang became a photographer. He and Douglas established the Leonard Frank Memorial Society of Documentary Photographers. They named it after Leonard Frank, an early British Columbia photographer. The Leonard Frank Society included Nina Raginsky, Tod Greenaway and Rod Gillingham. Lang took thousands of pictures of workaday Vancouver. Although his work garnered little interest at the time, in 2003 his photography was part of an exhibition at the Presentation House Gallery in North Vancouver. Curt Lang: Vancouver 1972, a selection of Lang's photographs, was on display in the Teck Gallery, at Simon Fraser University, Harbour Centre, from March 2012 to July 2012. The National Gallery of Canada purchased one of Lang's images in 1973. Most of his nearly twelve thousand photographs are housed in the Vancouver Public Library's Historical Photograph Collection.

=== Life at sea ===
In his thirties, Lang became a log salvager and taught himself to build boats. He started with small canoes and wooden rowboats and went on to create larger craft—steel tugs and barges. He built a welded aluminum fishing boat, the Whalebird, and fished with it for five years. He invented an apparatus that baited longline fishing gear. In 1984, he was granted a US Patent for it, but decided to leave maritime enterprises behind.

=== High-tech enterprises ===
Lang learned how to use computers and in 1986, founded Western Softworks, a contract programming business. Two years later, he had the idea of developing a range camera or 3-D scanner. He assembled a team of skilled programmers and engineers, including David Sloan, a physicist, who- while at MacDonald Dettwiler and Associates- was instrumental in getting the firm into the satellite business. Sloan also played a role in BC's wireless data industry while working at Mobile Data International. Lang attracted financing and in 1989, launched Range Vision Inc. In 1990, he was granted a US patent for a long-range scanner. BC Rail and Custom Industrial Automation (CIA) were among his first customers. BC Rail used a Range Vision system to inspect railroad tracks for wear and CIA bought one for detecting deformities in oil refinery coking tanks. Lang left Range Vision when he and his financial backers had a falling out. In 1997, the year he died, Lang started another company, Industrial Metrics Inc., based on Range Vision's technology. He was granted his final patent posthumously—for a hand-held, flexible scanner. When Lang died, Al Purdy wrote a poem about him. Lang's business associate, Gordon Cornwall, took over Industrial Metrics and sold it in 2008 to the Holland Company in Crete, Illinois.
