= Sandra Djwa =

Canadian writer (born 1939)

Sandra Djwa FRSC
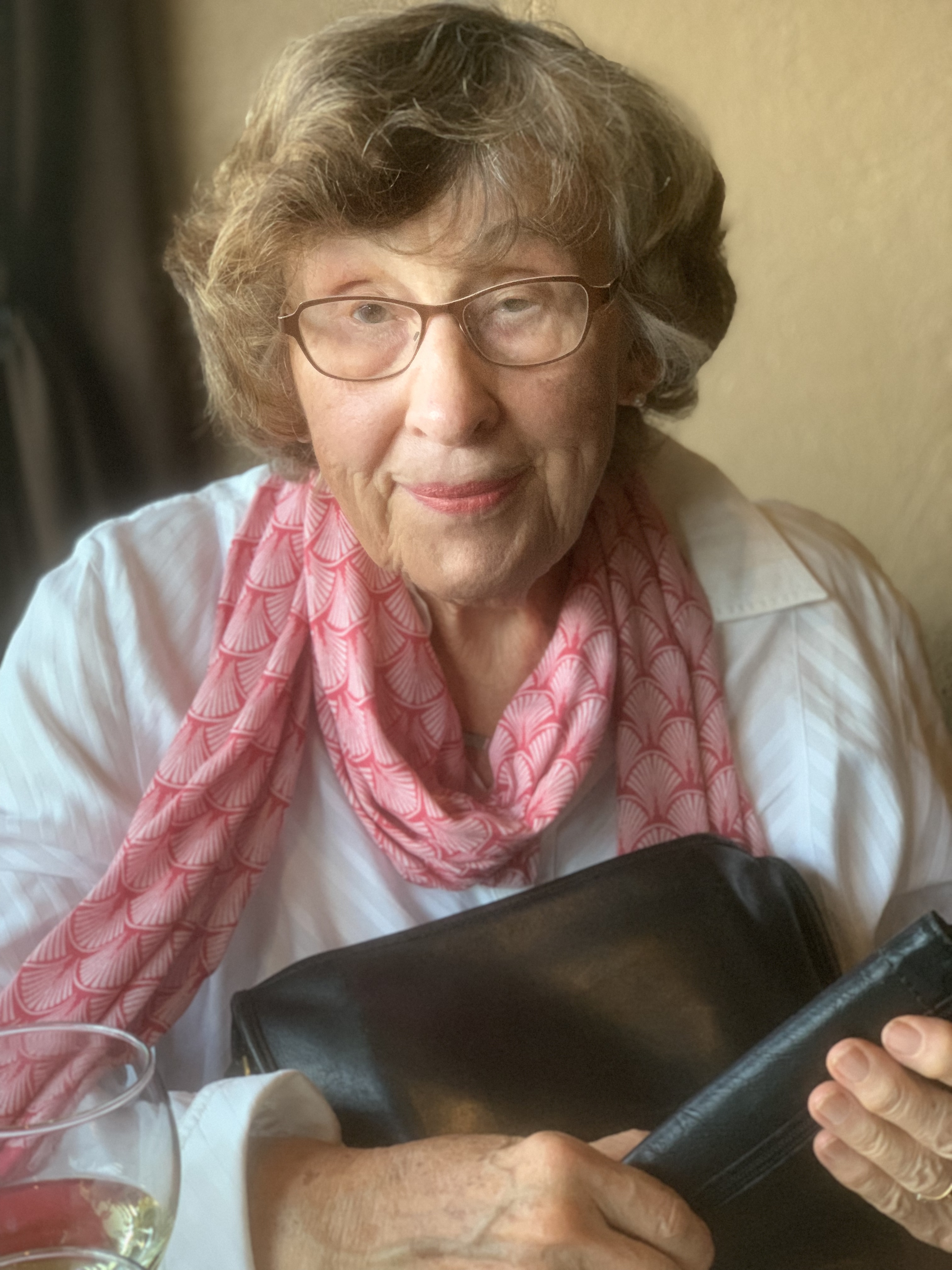
- Born: April 16, 1939 (age 87); St. John's, Newfoundland, Canada
- Education: University of British Columbia, Vancouver
- Occupations: Biographer, scholar
- Spouse: Peter Djwa Djing Kioe
- Children: 1 son
- Writing career
- Period: 1968–present
- Genre: Biography

Sandra Djwa CM FRSC (born April 16, 1939) is a Canadian writer, critic and cultural biographer. Originally from Newfoundland, she moved to British Columbia where she obtained her PhD from the University of British Columbia in 1968. In 1999, she was honored to deliver the Garnett Sedgewick Memorial Lecture in honor of the department's 80th anniversary. She taught Canadian literature in the English department at Simon Fraser University from 1968 to 2005 when she retired as J.S. Woodsworth Resident Scholar, Humanities. She was part of a seventies movement to establish the study of Canadian literature and, in 1973, cofounded the Association for Canadian and Québec Literatures (ACQL). She was Chair of the inaugural meeting of ACQL. She initiated textual studies of the poems of E. J. Pratt in the eighties, was editor of Poetry, "Letters in Canada" for the University of Toronto Quarterly (1980–1984), and Chair of Canadian Heads and Chairs of English (1989).

She is best known for articles on Canadian poets like Margaret Atwood and for her biographies of distinguished Canadians including F.R. Scott, and Roy Daniells. A biography of the poet PK Page, Journey With No Maps, was released in 2012. Djwa's biography of Scott was shortlisted for the Hubert Evans Prize in 1988 and a French translation, "F.R. Scott: Une vie," was shortlisted for the Governor-General's Award in French Translation in 2002. That same year, the biography of Roy Daniells was awarded the Lorne Pierce Gold medal for literature from the Royal Society of Canada.

Djwa was named to the Order of Canada in 2020 for her contributions to the fields of Canadian literature and Canadian literary criticism.

She has also edited and introduced other books, including the memoirs of Carl F. Klinck, first editor of "The Literary History of Canada". In 1981, she was awarded a Killam Senior Fellowship, in 1994 elected to the Royal Society of Canada, and in 1999 the Trimark Award for Mentoring. In 2002, Djwa was awarded an honorary degree from Memorial University, Newfoundland. She is now a general editor of the "Collected Works of P.K. Page".

The biography of PK Page, Journey With No Maps was released in the fall of 2012 by McGill-Queen's University Press. It was shortlisted for the 2013 Charles Taylor Prize for Literary Non-Fiction. It also won the 2013 Governor General Award for Non-fiction.

She gave the convocation speech and received the honorary Doctor of Letters honoris causa from McGill University, in Arts and Religious Studies, June 2016.

== Books ==
- Professing English: A Life of Roy Daniells. Toronto, Buffalo and London: University of Toronto Press, 2002
- F.R. Scott: Une vie, translation of F.R. Scott: The Politics of the Imagination, trans. Florence Bernard. Montreal: Editions du Boréal, publication 15 November 2001.
- Sandra Djwa, W.J. Keith, and Zailig Pollock, eds. Selected Poems of E. J. Pratt, with an introduction by Sandra Djwa. Toronto, Buffalo and London: University of Toronto Press, 2000.
- Monograph: Professing English at UBC: The Legacy of Roy Daniells and Garnett Sedgewick. The 1999 Garnett Sedgewick Memorial Lecture. Vancouver: Ronsdale Press, 2000.
- Giving Canada a Literary History: A Memoir by Carl F. Klinck, ed. Sandra Djwa. Ottawa/London: Carleton University Press for University of Western Ontario, 1991.
- Complete Poems of E. J. Pratt: A Definitive Edition, two vols., eds. Sandra Djwa and Gordon Moyles with introduction, annotations, variants, unpublished verse, and textual notes. Toronto: University of Toronto Press, 1989.
- The Politics of the Imagination: A Life of F.R. Scott. Toronto: McClelland & Stewart, 1987.
- Paperback: The Politics of the Imagination: A Life of F.R. Scott. Vancouver: Douglas & McIntyre, 1989.
- On F.R. Scott: Essays on His Contributions to Law, Literature and Politics, eds. Sandra Djwa and R.St.J. MacDonald. Montreal: McGill-Queen's University Press, 1983.
- Saul and Selected Poetry of Charles Heavysege, ed. Sandra Djwa with introduction, bibliography, and notes (Literature of Canada: Poetry in Reprint). Toronto: University of Toronto Press, 1976.
- E. J. Pratt: The Evolutionary Vision. Toronto/Montreal: Copp Clark/McGill-Queen's University Press, 1974.

== Educational background ==
1968 Ph.D. English, University of British Columbia, Canada "The Continuity of English Canadian Poetry"

1964 B.Ed. Honours English (First Class), University of British Columbia, Canada
