= Derek Lundy =

Canadian author (born 1946)

- Born: December 14, 1946 (age 79)
- Writing career
- Notable work: Godforsaken Sea: Racing the World's Most Dangerous Waters
- Website: dereklundy.com

Derek Lundy (born December 14, 1946) is a Northern Ireland-born Canadian author. His first published book was Scott Turow: Meeting the Enemy. He achieved bestseller status with his second work, Godforsaken Sea: Racing the World's Most Dangerous Waters, an account of the harrowing 1996 Vendée Globe round the world single-handed sailing race. It has been called "the best book ever written about the terrifying business of single-handed sailing" and Time magazine called it "one of the best books ever written about sailing." The book was a national bestseller in Canada and has been published around the world in translation.

He subsequently published The Way of a Ship: A Square-Rigger Voyage in the Last Days of Sail, a semi-fictionalized account of the voyage of Benjamin Lundy around Cape Horn on a square rigged sailing vessel in the late 19th century.

His next work was published in 2006 and was called The Bloody Red Hand: A Journey through Truth, Myth and Terror in Northern Ireland. It is an account of the Northern Irish Troubles and their historical roots, told through three of Lundy's ancestors, each of whom played an important role in Irish history. Although Lundy is an (Irish-born) Canadian author, the book received high praise in the United Kingdom. For example, Roy Foster (the Irish historian) stated in The Guardian that the book was "terse, idiomatic and arresting" and spoke of the "impressively assured" control of the material. The Independent said that it was a "distinguished work: erudite, earnest, elucidative, even-handed in its attempt to probe the Northern Ireland Protestant mind and memory-box".

Lundy's most recent published work is Borderlands: Riding the Edge of America, recounting his experiences riding a motorcycle along the U.S.'s northern and southern borders. It was published in Canada in May 2010. Borderlands was shortlisted for a British Columbia Book prize (the Hubert Evans non fiction prize) in 2011.

== Works ==
- Scott Turow: Meeting the Enemy (ECW Press: 1995)
- Godforsaken Sea: Racing the World's Most Dangerous Waters (Knopf: 1998)
- The Way of a Ship: A Square-Rigger Voyage in the Last Days of Sail (Knopf: 2002)
- The Bloody Red Hand: A Journey through Truth, Myth and Terror in Northern Ireland (British title: Men That God Made Mad) (2006)
