= Ulli Steltzer =

German photographer (1923–2018)

- Born: 2 October 1923; Frankfurt, Germany
- Died: 27 July 2018 (aged 94)
- Occupation: Photographer

Ulli Steltzer (2 October 1923 – 27 July 2018) was a German photographer best known for her works photographing First Nations people and art in B.C., Canada, including Haida artist Bill Reid. Steltzer had numerous exhibits in and around Vancouver, and both Princeton University and the University of Victoria have collections of her works.

== Biography ==
Ulli Steltzer was born in 1923 in Frankfurt, Germany.

She immigrated to the United States in 1953, where she opened her first portrait studio on Tulane Street in Princeton, New Jersey. Her photographs of Princeton's famous locals and visitors quickly gained her recognition across the country.

In the late 1960s, her work evolved to reflect the social issues of the time. She photographed black people under segregation, standing out from the other documentary photographers with her focus on the people, rather than their environment. She later wrote that "[she] was chilled by the discrimination [she] saw practiced against black Americans... Since then [she] devoted a good part of [her] life to documenting the lives and works of men and women of different minorities, both here and abroad."

Steltzer moved to Vancouver in 1972 and started photographing local indigenous people and their artwork. She is quoted saying that she stopped inside a store selling native goods, asked who had created a hand-woven basket and was appalled when the owner couldn't tell her. She credits this experience with her desire to create a book about indigenous artists at work. She used an unobtrusive hand-held Rollei camera to seek out "British Columbia's native artists in their own places, met them informally and recorded their rediscovery of their old skills".

Steltzer was awarded an honorary doctorate by the University of Victoria in 1997.

Steltzer died July 27, 2018, at the age of 94.

== Published works ==
She published numerous photographic collections, including:

- Steltzer, Ulli (1994). Indian artists at work. Vancouver: Douglas & McIntyre. ISBN 1550541471. OCLC 29910117.
- Steltzer, Ulli; Kerr, Catherine (1982). Coast of many faces. Seattle: University of Washington Press. ISBN 0295959258. OCLC 9206773.
- Steltzer, Ulli (1985). Inuit, the North in transition. Chicago: University of Chicago Press. ISBN 0226772470. OCLC 924918642.
- Steltzer, Ulli (1983). Health in the highlands: the Chimaltenango Development Program of Guatemala. Seattle: University of Washington Press. ISBN 0295959940. OCLC 86005287.
- Steltzer, Ulli (1984). A Haida potlatch. Seattle: University of Washington Press. ISBN 0295961597. OCLC 869539336.
- Steltzer, Ulli (1988). The new Americans: immigrant life in Southern California. Pasadena, Calif.: NewSage Press.
- Steltzer, Ulli; Usukawa, Saeko; George and Joanne MacDonald Collection of Northwest Coast Art (1993). Naanii Florence. Vancouver, B.C.?: U. Steltzer. OCLC 43293560.
- Steltzer, Ulli; Davidson, Robert (1994). Eagle transforming: the art of Robert Davidson. Douglas & McIntyre; University of Washington Press. ISBN 0295973714. OCLC 1005947292.
- Bringhurst, Robert (1995). The Black Canoe: Bill Reid and the spirit of Haida Gwaii. photographs by Ulli Steltzer. Vancouver; Toronto: Douglas & McIntyre. ISBN 1550544039. OCLC 35335250.
- Steltzer, Ulli (1995). Building an igloo. New York: H. Holt. ISBN 9780805037531.
- Steltzer, Ulli (1997). The spirit of Haida Gwaii: Bill Reid's masterpiece. Vancouver; Seattle, Wash.: Douglas & McIntyre; University of Washington Press. ISBN 0295976241.
- Steltzer, Ulli (2002). Sight and insight: life in Lijiang, Baidi, and Yongning. Chicago: Art Media Resources?. ISBN 7805868484. OCLC 56829958.
