= Darrel J. McLeod =

Canadian Cree writer (1957–2024)

- Born: 13 July 1957
- Died: 29 August 2024 (aged 67)
- Occupations: Biographer, Memoirist
- Writing career
- Subjects: Biographies, Memoirs
- Notable awards: Governor General's Award

Darrel James McLeod (July 13, 1957 – August 29, 2024) was a Canadian Cree writer. His memoir Mamaskatch: A Cree Coming of Age, an account of his childhood experience of physical and sexual abuse, won the Governor General's Award for English-language non-fiction at the 2018 Governor General's Awards and was a shortlisted finalist for the 2019 RBC Taylor Prize.

McLeod was born in 1957 in Athabasca, Alberta. Originally from Treaty 8 Cree territory near Smith, Alberta, McLeod went on to work as a teacher, a health care worker, a land claims negotiator and as director of education and international affairs for the Assembly of First Nations. He began writing the book while studying creative writing under Betsy Warland at Simon Fraser University.

The book also touches both on McLeod's coming out as a gay man, and on his sibling's transition as transgender.

His second book, Peyakow, was shortlisted for the 2021 Hilary Weston Writers' Trust Prize for Nonfiction, and the 2022 Jim Deva Prize for Writing that Provokes.

McLeod died in Victoria, British Columbia on August 29, 2024, at the age of 67.

== Bibliography ==
- Developing Culturally Focused Aboriginal Early Childhood Education Programs (2001)
- Mamaskatch: A Cree Coming of Age (2018)
- Peyakow: Reclaiming Cree Dignity, A Memoir (2021)
- A Season in Chezgh'un: A Novel (2023)
