= Suzanne Fournier =

American journalist

Suzanne Fournier is a former chief of public affairs for the U.S. Army Corps of Engineers (USACE) in Washington, DC.

Prior to her assignment as chief of public affairs, she served as a civilian employee of USACE in Iraq as part of the U.S. military deployment, and she was a blogger for the web site Cincinnati.com (the web site of The Cincinnati Enquirer), under the name "Grandma in Iraq." Her blog became controversial because although it was stated on the blog that she was a U.S. government employee, some readers of the blog were unaware that she was really a public affairs officer for the Gulf Region Southern District, U.S. Army Corps of Engineers. Some readers argued that Fournier was trying to sway public opinion without disclosing her identity as a professional public information officer.

A Freedom of Information Act request resulted in release of emails between Fournier, other USACE employees and The Cincinnati Enquirer. The blog was eventually discontinued.
