= Casey Wei =

Casey Wei (born 1985) is a Vancouver based artist working on multidisciplinary art, film and music.

== Life ==
Casey Wei was born in 1985 in Shanghai. She finished her MFA degree in SFU in 2012 and made her first film Murky Colors which was based on her father Menjin Wei’s novel. In 2014, her video work Vater und Sohn/Father and Son/父与子 (2014) was screened in The Cinematheque as part of the DIM cinema program. In Wei’s film, she explored the relationship between family, memories and history by collaging self-shoot and appropriated footage.

== Work ==
- Casey Wei currently works at the VIVO Media Arts Centre as Video Out Distribution and Outreach, 2020
- She is a co-founder and contributor of STILLS: moving image tract with Steffanie Ling,

== Art practice ==
Started in film making, Wei has gone on to work across disciplines such as music, art and performance. In 2015, she started the label Agony Klub which includes music and printed matter under the framework of “popularesoteric”, as a space to push the boundary between rock show and gallery. In 2017, Casey Wei held an event called Karaoke Video Maker Free Store that provided music video making for visitors. In 2025, Wei was awarded the Philip B. Lind Emerging Artist Prize by The Polygon Gallery.

== Selected performative art ==
- Kingsgate Happenings: Kingsgate Happening is an event held by Casey Wei near Kingsgate Mall that happened across June in 2014, serving as part of the dialogue between Western Front, local artists and the Kingsgate Mall. In the event, she booked bands to perform as a response to “Go Your Own Waste”. The documentation of the event reflected the Vancouver art and music scene.
- M:ST 10 Residency: This is a happening event that took place in Thailand within the M:ST 10 Performative Art Biennial. Casey Wei performed, lectured and traveled throughout Thailand from November 17 – December 14, 2019.

== Selected Film ==
- Murky Colors, 2012
- Vater und Sohn/Father and Son/父与子, 2014

== Selected Music ==
- Kamikaze Nurse
- Hazy
- Late Spring

== Selected Publication ==
- Ozu's Seasons, Edition of 100, Printed & bound by Colour Code, December 2017

== Selected Event ==
- Screening of Vater und Sohn/Father and Son/父与子, The Cinematheque, the Cinematheque’s DIM program, Vancouver 2014
- Karaoke Video Maker Free Store, UNIT/PITT Society for Art & Critical Awareness, Vancouver, April 2017
- Sum of the parts, Pollyanna Library, artists involved: Deanna Bowen, Felix Kalmenson, Divya Mehra, Krista Belle Stewart and Casey Wei, Vancouver 2018
- Pink noise pop up, ONE AND J. +1 (Seoul), Space One (Seoul), grunt gallery, artists involved: Jeneen Frei Njootli, Krista Belle Stewart, Ron Tran and Casey Wei, Ga Ram Kim and Yaloo, Vancouver 2018
- Casey Wei Screening at The Cinematheque, The Cinematheque, Vancouver, 2018

== Curator ==
- Art rock?, Vancouver, 2015
