= Lieutenant Governor's Award for Literary Excellence =

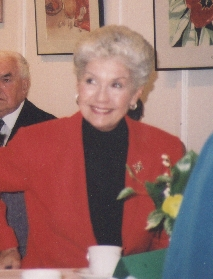
Iona Campagnolo

The Lieutenant Governor's Award for Literary Excellence is administered by the BC Book Prizes and recognizes a writer who has contributed significantly to the development of literary excellence in British Columbia, as well as having written a substantial body of literary work throughout his or her career.

The recipient receives a cash award of $5,000 and a commemorative certificate.

== History ==
The Lieutenant Governor’s Award for Literary Excellence was first conceived in the spring of 2002. Led by the late Carol Shields, a group of respected BC writers met with the current Lieutenant Governor of British Columbia, the Honourable Iona Campagnolo to initiate a special provincial literary arts award. Inspired by Shields, this meeting resulted in the establishment of the Lieutenant Governor’s Award for Literary Excellence.

== Winners ==
Award winners
| Year | Winner | Ref. |
|---|---|---|
| 2004 | P. K. Page | |
| 2005 | Robert Bringhurst | |
| 2006 | Jack Hodgins | |
| 2007 | Patrick Lane | |
| 2008 | Gary Geddes | |
| 2009 | Terry Glavin | |
| 2010 | Stan Persky | |
| 2011 | George Bowering | |
| 2012 | Brian Brett | |
| 2013 | Lorna Crozier | |
| 2013 | Sarah Ellis | |
| 2014 | Kit Pearson | |
| 2015 | Betty Keller | |
| 2016 | Alan Twigg | |
| 2017 | Douglas Coupland | |
| 2020 | Julie Flett | |
| 2020 | Joy Kogawa | |
| 2021 | Joseph A. Dandurand | |
| 2022 | Audrey Thomas | |
| 2023 | Robin Stevenson | |
| 2024 | Keith Maillard | |
| 2025 | Fred Wah | |
| 2026 | Tom Wayman | |

== Sources ==
- Lieutenant Governor's Award for Literary Excellence, official website
