= Harrison Mooney =

Canadian journalist and writer

Harrison Mooney is a Canadian journalist and writer, who won the Kobo Emerging Writer Prize for non-fiction in 2023 for his memoir Invisible Boy: A Memoir of Self-Discovery.

A journalist for the Vancouver Sun, Mooney wrote the book about his experiences growing up as a Black Canadian in an adoptive white Christian family, and subsequently meeting and reconnecting with his birth mother in his early 20s.

The book was also shortlisted for the Governor General's Award for English-language non-fiction at the 2023 Governor General's Awards, and for the Jim Deva Prize for Writing that Provokes.
