= Billy-Ray Belcourt =

Cree poet, scholar, and author

- Born: October 21, 1994 (age 32)
- Education: University of Alberta (PhD); Oxford University (MSt); University of Alberta (BA)
- Occupations: Author, poet, scholar
- Notable work: This Wound is a World; A History of My Brief Body
- Awards: Rhodes Scholarship (2016) Griffin Poetry Prize (2018)
- Website: billy-raybelcourt.com

Billy-Ray Belcourt (born October 21, 1994) is a poet, scholar, and author from the Driftpile Cree Nation.

Belcourt's works cover a variety of topics and themes, including decolonial love, grief, intimacy, queer sexuality, and the role of Indigenous women in social resistance movements. Belcourt is the author of the poetry collection This Wound Is a World, which was chosen as one of CBC's best poetry books of 2017 and won the 2018 Griffin Poetry Prize. Belcourt was the 2016 recipient of the Rhodes Scholarship and is an associate professor in the School of Creative Writing at the University of British Columbia.

== Life ==
Belcourt grew up in the community of Driftpile, Alberta. He was raised by his grandparents and began writing poetry around the age of 19.

As an undergraduate student, Belcourt studied comparative literature at the University of Alberta where he graduated with a Bachelor of Arts in 2016. While at the University of Alberta, Belcourt was actively involved as "an advocate for LGBTQ and Indigenous communities", which included serving as the Aboriginal Student Council president. He was also a Youth Facilitator with the Native Youth Sexual Health Network (NYSHN).

In 2015, Belcourt was selected as a recipient of the Rhodes Scholarship to study at Wadham College, Oxford University, for the 2016–2017 school year. In 2017, Belcourt graduated from Oxford University with a master's degree in women's studies. His master's thesis focused on "the role of Indigenous women in social resistance movements."

While an active writer and poet throughout his university career, Belcourt published his first book, This Wound Is a World, in 2017. This was followed by his second book in 2019: NDN Coping Mechanisms, Notes from the Field. In 2020, he released his third book, A History of My Brief Body: A Memoir, accompanied by A History of My Brief Body: Essays.

In 2020, Belcourt completed a PhD in the Department of English and Film Studies at the University of Alberta. His research focused on the "Indigenous paranormal" in art, poetry, and film produced by First Nations people.

In January 2020, Belcourt joined the University of British Columbia's Creative Writing Program, where he is an associate professor in Indigenous Creative Writing.

Belcourt released his first novel, A Minor Chorus, was published in 2022. It was shortlisted for the 2023 Amazon Canada First Novel Award. It was one of the shortlisted books for the 2026 edition of the Canada Reads competition, defended by Elle-Máijá Tailfeathers.

== Publications ==
=== Books ===
- This Wound Is a World. Frontenac House. 2017. ISBN 978-1-927823-64-4.
- NDN Coping Mechanisms: Notes from the Field. House of Anansi Press. 2019. ISBN 978-1-4870-0578-8.
- A History of My Brief Body. Hamish Hamilton. 2020. ISBN 978-0-735237-79-7.
- A Minor Chorus. Hamish Hamilton. 2022. ISBN 978-0-735242-00-5.
- Coexistence. Hamish Hamilton. 2024. ISBN 978-0-735242-03-6.
- The Idea of an Entire Life. Beacon Press. 2025. ISBN 978-0-807022-40-5.
- Idealism and Despair. Hamish Hamilton. 2026.

=== Essays and scholarship ===
- "To Be Unbodied". Canadian Art. 2019-03-07.
- "Meditations on Reserve Life, Biosociality, and the Taste of Non-Sovereignty". Settler Colonial Studies. 8 (1): 1–15. January 2017.
- "The Optics of the Language: How Joi T. Arcand Looks with Words". Canadian Art. 2017-08-29.
- "Top or Bottom: How Do We Desire?". The New Inquiry. With George Dust, Kay Gabriel, and Lou Cornum. 2017-08-18.
- "The Body Remembers When the World Broke Open". Arts Everywhere. 2017-02-08.
- "A Poltergeist Manifesto". Feral Feminisms (6): 22–32. Fall 2016.
- "Making Friends for the End of the World". GUTS. No. 6. With Maura Roberts. 2016-05-23.
- "Can the Other of Native Studies Speak?". Decolonization. 2016-02-01.
- "Political Depression in a Time of Reconciliation". Active History. 2016-01-15.
- "The Day of the TRC Final Report: On Being in This World Without Wanting It". Rabble. 2015-12-15.

=== Creative writing and poetry ===
- "Bad Lover". The Journal. No. 43.4. Fall 2019.
- "Gay Incantations". Voicemail Poems. 2019-08-20.
- "What Is a Human Possibility?". The Puritan. No. 46. Summer 2019.
- "NDN Homopoetics". Academy of American Poets. 2019-01-31.
- "Cree Girl Explodes the Necropolis of Ottawa". Brick. No. 102. Winter 2019.
- "NDN Brothers". The Rumpus. 2018-11-07.
- "The Terrible Beauty of the Reserve". The Walrus. 2018-06-07.
- "What If I Never Write a Novel". Little Fiction Big Truths. 2018.
- "Ode to Northern Alberta". This Magazine. 2017-10-27.
- "Love is a Moontime Teaching" (PDF). The Malahat Review: 91. Winter 2016.

== Awards ==
Year	Nominated work	Award	Category	Result	Ref.
2025	Coexistence	Danuta Gleed Literary Award	N/A	Shortlisted	
2025	Coexistence	Jim Deva Prize for Writing that Provokes	N/A	Shortlisted	
2021	A History of My Brief Body	Jim Deva Prize for Writing that Provokes	N/A	Shortlisted	
2020	NDN Coping Mechanisms	Alberta Literary Awards	Stephan G. Stephansson Award for Poetry	Won	
2019	N/A	Indspire Awards	Youth – First Nation	Won	
2018	This Wound Is a World	Robert Kroetsch City of Edmonton Book Prize	N/A	Won	
2018	This Wound Is a World	Indigenous Voices Awards	Most Significant Work of Poetry in English by an Emerging Indigenous Writer	Won	
2018	This Wound Is a World	Griffin Poetry Prize	N/A	Won	
2018	This Wound Is a World	Gerald Lampert Award	N/A	Shortlisted	
2018	This Wound Is a World	Raymond Souster Award	N/A	Shortlisted	
2017	This Wound Is a World	CBC Best Books of the Year	Canadian Poetry	Won	
2017	"Love Is a Moontime Teaching"	P. K. Page Founders' Award for Poetry	N/A	Won	
2016	N/A	Rhodes Scholarship	N/A	Won	

== Reception ==
Belcourt was called "one of the smartest emerging Indigenous writers in Canada" by the CBC in 2017. CBC featured This Wound Is a World in their top ten poetry collections from 2017, stating that the book is "perspicuous in style and exacting in its determination to upend genre and form." Leanne Betasamosake Simpson named it as her favorite book of 2017, calling Belcourt "a sovereign genius" and the collection "a radical celebration of Indigenous life and our beautiful, intimate rebellion." Lisa Tatonetti called it a "powerful meditation on the intersections of violence, love, and the body."

NDN Coping Mechanisms was well-received, being included in Library Journal's Best Books 2019 and the Writers' Trust of CanadaBest Books of 2019. It was named CBC Books' best Canadian poetry book of 2019. It was a finalist for the 2020 ReLit Award for poetry.

A History of My Brief Body was described by Kirkus Reviews as an "urgently needed, unyielding book of theoretical and intimate strength." The book was a finalist for the Lambda Literary Award for Gay Memoir or Biography at the 33rd Lambda Literary Awards.
