= Maria Tippett =

Canadian historian

Maria W. Tippett FRSC L.L. D., D.Litt (December 9, 1944 – August 8, 2024) was a Canadian historian specialising in Canadian art history. Her 1979 biography of Emily Carr won the Governor General's Award for English-language non-fiction.

Educated at Simon Fraser University and the University of London, Tippett went on to win several awards and wrote extensive biographies of Emily Carr, Frederick Varley, Bill Reid, and Yousuf Karsh. Tippett has also written, among others, books on the photography of Charles Gimpel, the parents of the AIDS scientist David Ho, Canadian war art and landscape painting in addition to two collections of short stories. In addition to her writing, Tippett held positions and fellowships at several universities, including Simon Fraser University, York University, the Institute for Advanced Study in Princeton, and Cambridge University.

== Biography ==
Raised in Victoria, British Columbia, Tippett travelled through Europe and the Middle East for three years following high school before attending Vancouver City College and Simon Fraser University. She received a doctorate in history from the University of London. From 1971 to 1983 she was married to Canadian Historian Douglas Cole. In 1991 she married Professor Peter Clarke, British historian and former Master of Trinity Hall, Cambridge University.

Until 1990, Tippett taught at Simon Fraser University, the University of British Columbia, Emily Carr College of Art and Design and was the Robarts Professor of Canadian Studies at York University, Toronto.

At Cambridge she was a visiting fellow at Clare Hall (1991–1992), then a research associate at the Scott Polar Research Institute (1993–95). In 1995 she was appointed a senior research fellow and tutor at Churchill College, Cambridge (1995–2004). Tippett was a member of the Cambridge Faculty of History from 1992 to 2004 and was chair of the Churchill College Art Gallery from 1997 to 2001. In 1997 she and Peter Clarke wrote the libretto for the opera, "Churchill's Finest Hour, A Musical Burlesque in four acts", composed by Jeremy Thurlow of Churchill College, Cambridge.

In 2004, Tippett returned to Canada and was an associate research professor at Simon Fraser University from 2006 to 2010.

Tippett was a member of the editorial board of The Canadian Historical Review, Canadian Art, Art Focus and an Arts Journalist Fellow at The Banff Centre in 1988. In 1992 she was elected a fellow of the Royal Society of Canada. She has received honorary doctorates from the University of Windsor in 1994, and from the University of Victoria (2006) as well as from Simon Fraser University (2006). In May 2014, Maria Tippett's name was added to Victoria High School's "Wall of Fame".

In the course of her career, Tippett curated art exhibitions at Simon Fraser University Art Gallery (BC Canada), Museum London (Ontario, Canada), the National Library (Luxembourg), as well as at the Clare Hall Gallery at Cambridge University and the Art Gallery at Churchill College (Cambridge University). She judged the Governor General's non-fiction Book Award and the BC Book Prize. She lectured in South America, Europe, Japan, New Zealand, Australia in addition to Canada and the United States.

Tippett was also a consultant and television presenter for the Canadian Broadcasting Corporation and the British Broadcasting Corporation. In 1998, Tippett was appointed to The Canadian Memorial Foundation, Canada House in London, where she was a member of the board until 2005. In 2010 she was a fellow at the Institute for Advanced Study at Princeton. From 2012 to 2019, she was a member of the Craigdarroch Research Awards Committee at the University of Victoria and also a member of the President's Advisory Committee and the Dean of Fine and Performing Arts' Advisory Committee at the same institution. In 2021 Tippett became a member of the Advisory Board of The British Columbia Review and in 2023 joined the board of the British Columbia and Yukon Book Prizes.

== Works ==
=== Books ===
- From Desolation to Splendour: Changing Perceptions of the British Columbia Landscape (1977) [with Douglas Cole]
- Phillips in Print: The Selected Writings of Walter J. Phillips on Canadian Nature and Art (1977) [with Douglas L. Cole][4]
- Emily Carr, A Biography (1979)
- Art at the Service of War: Canada, Art, and the Great War (1984)
- Breaking the Cycle, and Other Stories from a Gulf Island (1989)
- Making Culture: English-Canadian Institutions and the Arts before the Massey Commission (1990)
- By a Lady: Celebrating Three Centuries of Art by Canadian Women (1992)
- Between Two Cultures: A Photographer among the Inuit (1994)
- Becoming Myself: A Memoir (1996)
- Stormy Weather: F.H. Varley, A Biography (1998)
- Bill Reid: The Making of an Indian (2004)
- Portrait in Light and Shadow: The Life of Yousuf Karsh (2007)
- Eating Bitter: A Chinese American Saga (2010)
- Made in British Columbia: Eight Ways of Making Culture (2015)
- Sculpture in Canada: A History (2017)
- Sculpture and its Relation to Writing, Music, Photography and Modernism (editor) (2020)
- Art for Art's Sake (2022)
- Canadian Art Matters, New Ways of Seeing (forthcoming)

=== Papers ===
Selected List

- "A Life in History: From Making Culture to Making Cultural History" Canadian Historical Review, March (Vol 99 No. 1) 2018
- "Jeffrey Rubinoff and Canada" James Fox (ed). The Art of Jeffrey Rubinoff, (Vancouver: Douglas & McIntyre, 2016)
- "Art Made for Strangers': Re-Thinking Inuit Art" Sir Roy Calne and William O'Reilly (eds). Scepticism (New York: Nova Publishers, 2012)
- "Canadian Culture" Irvin Stubin (ed). What is a Canadian? (Toronto: McClelland and Stewart, 2006)
- "Expressing Identity" Beaver Magazine Vol 86 No 1 (2000)
- "Cultural History: A Subject in Search of a Agenda" Canadian Historical Review, Volume 5 No 3 (1994)
- "Canadian Art and the Great War" Franz K. Stanzel (ed)., Intimate Enemies: English-German literary reactions to the Great War (Heidelberg: Universitat verlag C. Winter, 1993)
- "Sea and Art" L.D. McCann (ed). The Sea and Culture of Atlantic Canada (Sackville: Mount Allison University, 1992)
- "The Origins of the Canada Council: the most generous sugar daddy art has ever known" in Peter Easingwood et al. Probing Canadian Culture (Augsburg: A-V Verlag, 1991)
- "Emily Carr" Michael Toobey (ed). True North: Canadian Landscape Painting 1896–1939 (London: Barbican Art Gallery, 1991)
- "Canadian Art and Propaganda During the Great War" Canadian High Commission, (London) [pamphlet] (1989)
- "The Making of English-Canadian Culture, 1900–1939: the external influences" [pamphlet] York University, 1988
- "The writing of English-Canadian cultural history, 1970–85." The Canadian Historical Review Volume 67, Issue 4 (1986).

=== Exhibitions curated with catalogue ===
- Selected List
- "Contemporaries of Emily Carr" Simon Fraser University Art Gallery (1974)
- "Ingeborg Mohr, selected works" Simon Fraer University Art Gallery (1983)
- "Lest We Forget" London Regional Art Gallery (1989)
- "Charles Gimpel, photographer of Arctic Canada and Collector of Inuit Art" National Library, Luxembourg, (1995)
- "Marcel Barbeau", Churchill College Art Gallery, 2000.

== Awards and honours ==
- Butler Book Prize, 2018, short-listed, "Sculpture in Canada, a history"
- Melva J Dwyer Award, 2018, short-listed, "Sculpture in Canada, a history"
- Hubert Evans non-fiction Prize, 2016, short-listed, "Made in British Columbia, Eight Ways of Making Culture"
- Basil Stuart-Stubbs Book Prize, short-listed, 2016, "Made in British Columbia, Eight Ways of Making Culture"
- Canadian non-fiction Award, short-listed, 2007, Portrait in Light and Shadow: The Life of Yousuf Karsh
- Dafoe Book Prize, short-listed, 2008, "Portrait in Light and Shadow: The Life of Yousuf Karsh"
- Honorary doctorate, Simon Fraser University, 2006 (DLitt)
- Honorary doctorate, University of Victoria, 2006
- Hubert Evans non-fiction Prize, 2004, "Bill Reid, the making of an Indian"
- Honorary L.L.D., Windsor University, 1994
- BC Book Prize, short-listed, 1993, "By a Lady, Celebrating Three Centuries of Art by Canadian Women"
- Van City Book Prize, short-listed, 1993, "By a Lady, Celebrating Three Centuries of Art by Canadian Women"
- Canada 125 Medal, 1992
- elected a fellow of the Royal Society of Canada. in 1992
- Canadian Studies Writing Award, 1982
- Governor General's Award for non-fiction, 1979, "Emily Carr: a biography"
- John A. Macdonald History Prize, 1979, "Emily Carr: a biography"
- Garneau Medal, short-listed, 1980, "Emily Carr: a biography"
- Eaton's BC Book Award – now the BC and Yukon Book Prize, 1978, "From Desolation to Splendour: changing perceptions of the British Columbia Landscape"
