= BC and Yukon Book Prizes =

Canadian literary awards

The BC & Yukon Book Prizes, established in 1985, celebrate the achievements of British Columbia and Yukon writers and publishers.

The prizes, as well as the Lieutenant Governor's Award for Literary Excellence, are presented annually at the Lieutenant Governor's BC Book Prize Gala in April.

The prizes are administered and awarded by the West Coast Book Prize Society. Publicity, organization of the awards and fundraising for the Gala and prize pool was handled by Vancouver marketing and publicity firm, Rebus Creative until the end of 2018. In early 2019, Sean Cranbury was appointed as Executive Director by the Board of the West Coast Book Prize Society to take over production and promotion of the BC & Yukon Book Prizes. In 2021, Sharon Bradley took over as Executive Director, and Megan Cole was hired as the Director of Programming and Communications.

In 2019, the prizes announced a name change from BC Book Prizes to BC & Yukon Book Prizes. The award criteria has always been open to Yukon writers as well as British Columbian writers, and the name change was made to reflect that dedication. Further to that dedication, in 2020, the Borealis Prize: The Commissioner of Yukon Award for Literary Contribution was announced in partnership with the Commissioner of Yukon. The Borealis Prize was established to recognize the lifetime achievement of an individual's contributions to the Yukon writing and publishing community.

== Administration ==
=== Core board members ===
The current president is Robert Bittner, an educator and researcher in the field of children's and young adult literature. Tara Borin, a poet based in Dawson City, Yukon, holds the position of secretary. And, the present treasurer of the non-profit organization overseeing the BC and Yukon Book Prizes is Michelle Chang.

=== Members at large ===
Michael Hayworth, a former University of British Columbia and Simon Fraser University IT services employee who holds a degree in publishing from the latter university. Digby R. Leig, a lawyer practicing in North Vancouver, British Columbia who has a history of community sports involvement. Frances Peck, a teacher of editing at Douglas College and Simon Fraser University, who volunteers with Editors Canada. Kathryn Shoemaker, an author and illustrator of children's literature, and former president of the Endeavour Society and the Canadian Mental Health Association, who presently holds a position as an adjunct professor at the University of British Columbia. And, Grant T. Smith, a chartered professional accountant with previous experiences working in theatrical revitalization across Canada.

== Awards ==
=== Nomination criteria ===
Although not a requirement on all of the prizes, the Bill Duthie, Sheila A. Egoff, Hubert Evans, Dorothy Livesay, and Ethel Wilson awards stipulate that in order to be nominated one must be either a current resident of British Columbia or Yukon, or have resided in either for three of the previous five years.

=== Annual prizes ===
Dorothy Livesay Poetry Prize

The Dorothy Livesay Poetry Prize is annually awarded to the best original work of poetry produced by a resident of British Columbia or the Yukon. Originally established in 1986 as the BC Poetry Prize, the award was renamed to its current title in 1989 after the poet Dorothy Livesay.

Ethel Wilson Fiction Prize

The Ethel Wilson Fiction Prize is annually awarded to the best original work of fiction produced by a resident of British Columbia or the Yukon. Established in 1985, it is currently supported by Friesens.

Roderick Haig-Brown Regional Prize

The Roderick Haig-Brown Regional prize is annually awarded to the best original work which contributes "the most to the enjoyment and understanding of the province of British Columbia". Its holds no specific subject requirement (the work can depict the province's history, geography, people, etc.) and may be published anywhere. It is supported by Marquis, Victoria Bindery, and First Choice Books.

Hubert Evans Non-Fiction Prize

The Hubert Evans Non-Fiction Prize is annually awarded to the best original work of non-fiction produced by a resident of British Columbia or the Yukon. Supported by the BC Teacher's Federation, its respects a broad range of subjects as long as the work reflects "quality of research and writing along with insight and originality".

Sheila A. Egoff Children's Literature Prize

The Sheila A. Egoff Children's Literature Prize is annually awarded to the best children's work produced by a resident of British Columbia or the Yukon. Though the work can be either fiction or non-fiction (including biography), it cannot be "highly" illustrated. Carrying a cash value of 2,000 CAD, the prize has been supported by the British Columbia Library Association since its inception in 1987.

Christie Harris Illustrated Children's Literature Prize

The Christie Harris Illustrated Children's Literature Prize is annually award to the best children's illustrated work produced by a resident of British Columbia of the Yukon. The work can be either fiction or non-fiction and the prize is jointly shared by the author and illustrator.

Bill Duthie Booksellers' Choice Award

The Bill Duthie Booksellers' Choice Award is annually awarded for "best book in terms of public appeal, initiative, design, production and content", and is shared by the author and publisher.

Jim Deva Prize for Writing that Provokes

Introduced in 2019 and first awarded in 2020, the Jim Deva Prize for Writing that Provokes is for original work that "challenges or provokes the ideas and forces that shape what writing, art, and/or society can become." The category is open to a wide range of writing, including poetry, nonfiction, fiction, work for children, and graphic novels. The award is named for the co-founder and co-owner of Little Sister's Book and Art Emporium in Vancouver, British Columbia, and the award is supported by Deva's partner Bruce Smyth. Both Deva and Smyth were dedicated to the freedom of information, and the freedom of sexual expression and identity.

Lieutenant Governor's Award for Literary Excellence

The Lieutenant Governor's Award for Literary Excellence is annually awarded to "recognize British Columbia writers who have contributed to the development of literary excellence" and is supported by the Government House Foundation. The award was originally established by The Honourable Iona Campagnolo in 2003.

Borealis Prize: The Commissioner of Yukon Award for Literary Contribution

In 2020, the Borealis Prize was announced in partnership with the Commissioner of Yukon to recognize the lifetime achievement of an individual's contributions to the Yukon writing and publishing community. The prize is open to nominations of authors as well as others such as volunteers who work with or in the literary community.

== Efforts Against Censorship ==
During the year of the 15th annual BC Book Prizes Gala, over $2,250 was raised to initiate the B.C. Civil Liberties Defence Fund. This was in the efforts of stopping censorship to help protect the freedom of ideas.

== On Tour ==
There is a tradition built up for selected authors who were finalists for the BC Book Prizes to go on tour giving free readings at BC schools and public venues. Each year they go on a couple of different legs, each one consisting of two authors and taking anywhere between 2–5 days on each route. These routes include Northern BC Leg, Southern BC Leg, Peace River Leg, Vancouver Island Leg, Kootenays Leg, Peace Country Leg, BC Interior Leg, Vancouver Island Leg, Okanagan Leg, and the Lower Mainland Leg.

== Lieutenant Governor's BC Book Prizes Gala ==
The winners for the annual BC & Yukon Book Prizes is announced at the Lieutenant Governor's BC Book Prizes Gala, which takes place each Spring. Every three years, the awards take place at Government House in Victoria, British Columbia. The winners are collectively awarded with $19,000 in cash prizes and are sponsored by the West Coast Book Prize Society.
