= National Action Plan to Combat Human Trafficking =

Canadian action plan established in 2012

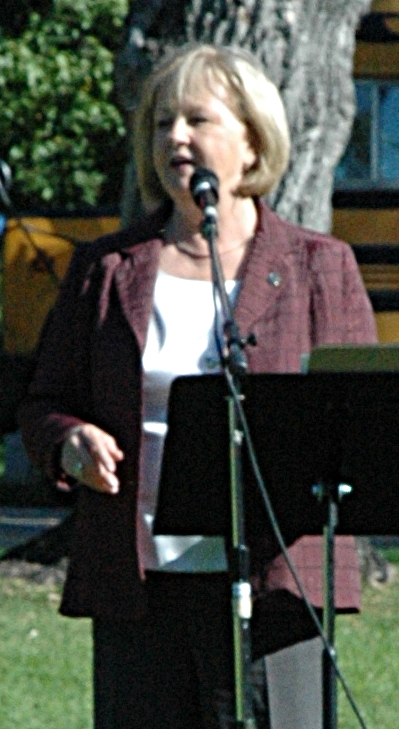
Joy Smith suggested the NAP-CHT to the House of Commons, prepared the initial proposal, advocated that it be implemented, and announced its establishment once it had been adopted.

The National Action Plan to Combat Human Trafficking is a four-year action plan that was established by the Government of Canada on June 6, 2012, to oppose human trafficking in Canada. In 2004, the government's Interdepartmental Working Group on Trafficking in Persons was mandated to create a national anti-human-trafficking plan, but the mandate went unfulfilled despite reminders from politicians and non-governmental organizations (NGOs). Member of Parliament (MP) Joy Smith put forward motion C-153 in February 2007 to put a plan in place, and the House of Commons passed it unanimously. Smith began developing a proposal and released it in September 2010 under the title "Connecting the Dots". University of British Columbia law professor Benjamin Perrin helped guide Smith's writing of the proposal. Before the establishment of the NAP-CHT, a variety of people and organizations—including the 2009 and 2010 Trafficking in Persons (TIP) Reports of the United States Department of State—criticized Canada for failing to have such a plan.

During the 2011 Canadian federal election, Stephen Harper, Prime Minister of Canada, promised to establish the NAP-CHT by 2012 and to invest CA$20 million into it. The Plan was established by the Government of Canada on schedule on June 28, 2012, with a budget of $25 million, $500,000 of which was to be used for supporting victims. The NAP-CHT's recommendations are divided into four categories called the "4 Ps": partnership, prevention, prosecution, and protection. Although Smith recommended that the government investigate ways in which prostitution law in Canada might be altered to emulate Sweden's Sex Purchase Act, thereby prosecuting those who purchase sexual acts and not those who perform them, the plan does not make any such legislative recommendations. The NAP-CHT replaced the IWG-TIP with the Human Trafficking Taskforce, chaired by Public Safety Canada and mandated with coordinating the plan's implementation and the generation of annual progress reports, to be made publicly available.

The National Action Plan was received positively by many, but not all, Canadian NGOs and law enforcement officials. Natasha Falle, founder and director of Sex Trade 101, said that, as an organization of sex trafficking victims, they were extremely pleased with the establishment of the NAP-CHT. When the Canadian government announced that the country's sex industry would no longer be allowed to employ foreign workers because of the risks of exploitation, abuse, and trafficking in that environment, Tim Lambrinos—leader of the Adult Entertainment Association of Canada—said that he might challenge the policy because he believed that the government was "destroying an industry [and] creating a labour shortage." Bethany Hastie of McGill University, Shae Invidiata of Free-Them, and Andrea Burkhart of ACT Alberta all criticized the plan for focusing too much on law enforcement and not enough on victim services.

== Proposals ==
=== Background ===
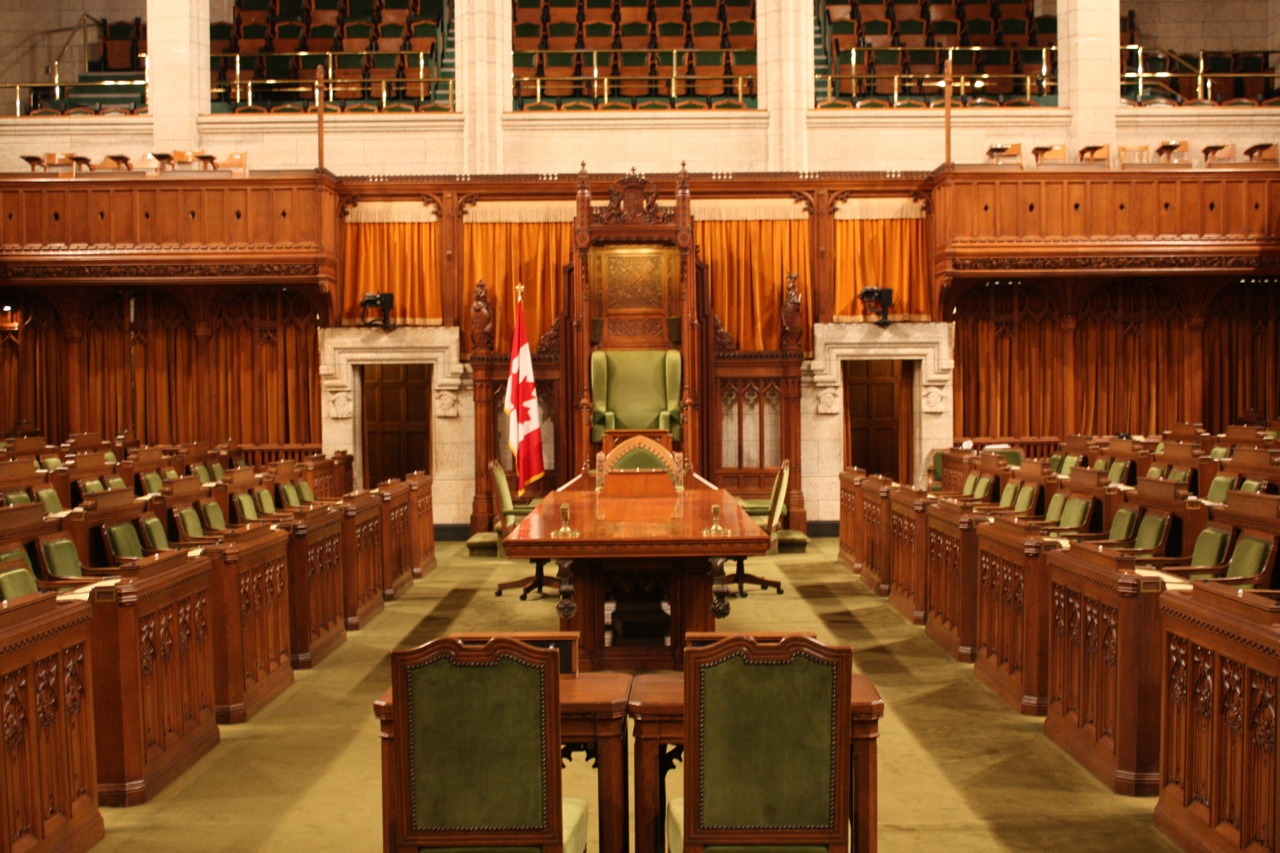
When Joy Smith proposed the implementation of an anti-human-trafficking national action plan to the House of Commons (pictured) in 2007, the motion was passed unanimously.

In 2004, the Interdepartmental Working Group on Trafficking in Persons (IWG-TIP), the working group responsible for coordinating the Government of Canada's efforts against human trafficking, was mandated to create a national anti-human-trafficking plan. On March 31 of that year, the IWG-TIP website was updated to state that it was meeting with academics and non-governmental organizations (NGOs) "to discuss various elements of a potential federal anti-trafficking strategy," but no more updates were forthcoming on the website for the next four years. Politicians and NGOs proceeded to remind the IWG-TIP of its unfulfilled mandate for the eight years following 2004, and the IWG-TIP continued to promise to establish such a plan.

Joy Smith, Member of Parliament (MP) for Kildonan—St. Paul with the Conservative Party, put forward motion C-153 in February 2007 to put in place a Canada-wide action plan to combat human trafficking, and the House of Commons passed the motion unanimously. Thomas Axworthy of the Toronto Star said that the unanimity of this decision demonstrated that the Harper government was just as dedicated to opposing human trafficking as was Barack Obama, President of the United States. Early promoters of a Canadian anti-trafficking action plan hoped for up to $100 million in funding, which they argued would turn Canada into a world leader in the fight against human trafficking. World Vision Canada began lobbying for a national human trafficking action plan in 2009.

=== "Connecting the Dots" ===
==== Development ====
In September 2009, Smith's Bill C-268 successfully passed into law as An Act to amend the Criminal Code (minimum sentence for offences involving trafficking of persons under the age of eighteen years). The following September, she released "Connecting the Dots", a national action plan proposal she had been working on for three years. "Connecting the Dots" sought "to rescue and restore the victims and prosecute the offenders" of human trafficking; Smith intended it to address both trafficking within Canada and international trafficking into the country. Smith announced several dozen specific recommendations for the proposed plan, one of which was to create an office to regularly evaluate national human trafficking opposition efforts and generate annual reports of their findings. Other recommendations were to increase funding for organizations that support human trafficking victims; to establish safe houses for victims in every Canadian province; to increase the use of Canada's human trafficking laws by educating police, judges, and lawyers about these relatively new laws; to initiate an extensive public relations campaign on the subject; and to have the federal government coordinate its activities with provincial governments, Aboriginal leaders, NGOs, law enforcement agencies, and human trafficking survivors.

Smith recommended that the Canadian government investigate ways in which prostitution law in Canada might be altered to emulate Sweden's 1999 Sex Purchase Act, which criminalizes purchasing and attempting to purchase sex in Sweden—whether in the context of brothels, massage parlors, or street prostitution. Human trafficking in Sweden has significantly decreased since the institution of the Sex Purchase Act, and Smith said that Canada "can adapt many concepts from [the Swedish] model concerning the demand for the sex trade." Smith's proposal recommended that Canada, like Sweden, prosecute those who purchase sexual acts and not those who perform them. Smith's recommendations were in keeping with a 2007 report released by the Standing Committee on the Status of Women, which stated that prostitutes should be considered exploitation victims and that prostitution has been demonstrated to engender human trafficking.

Smith argued that Canadians convicted of child sexual abuse should not be permitted to travel outside Canada, and that Canada should help combat the trafficking of children in other countries. The "Connecting the Dots" document called for the institution of a "Connecting the Dots Day" at elementary schools for students in Grade 6, which Smith suggested would be the best grade in which to introduce the concept of human trafficking to students because younger children are increasingly at risk of being victimized. She also recommended that the Canada Border Services Agency (CBSA) track foreign women who arrive alone in Canada for six months to ensure their safety from traffickers. Smith said that she was "convinced that a federally led national action plan would address [the] challenges [of human trafficking] by implementing an integrated response to target the traffickers and provide relief and protection for the victims." She said that the plan needed to be integrated on a national level because human trafficking is a clandestine activity. Smith advocated making the protection of victims central to the plan, and recommended consulting First Nations communities about anti-human-trafficking efforts. University of British Columbia law professor Benjamin Perrin helped guide Smith's writing of "Connecting the Dots".

==== Responses ====
Smith's proposal received strong endorsement from organizations that support human trafficking victims and from law enforcement agencies. Marlene Jennings, a Liberal MP, praised Smith's proposal overall but argued that it did not sufficiently distinguish between human trafficking and prostitution. Smith responded that there is a clear correlation between the two issues. Callandra Cochrane of Citizens for Public Justice said that such a plan "has become an imperative in order to ensure the protection of victims and effectively combat human trafficking," but that Smith's proposal had "definite weaknesses that need to be strengthened." Cochrane praised the document's suggestions that NGOs be granted funding, that efforts be coordinated with First Nations communities, that awareness-raising campaigns be initiated, and that immigration be regulated. She argued that "Connecting the Dots" was too focused on those who create the demand for sex trafficking and did not sufficiently address victim rehabilitation. Loly Rico of the Canadian Council for Refugees made the same complaint. Rico recommended that the proposal be amended to allow human trafficking victims to become permanent residents of Canada so they would be more effectively protected against being trafficked again.

In October 2010, Tara Teng used her position as Miss BC World to meet with Stephen Harper, Prime Minister of Canada, to discuss the possibility of implementing the NAP-CHT. The day after their meeting, Teng received a letter from Harper stating that he was against human trafficking. Teng was disappointed that he did not have a more substantial response to their meeting, and she said that she "would like to see even more, to be very honest, from him as the person entrusted to protect the Canadian people." In 2011, Teng—who was Miss Canada at the time—helped Smith promote the proposal while Teng was interning with Smith through Trinity Western University's Laurentian Leadership Centre. Smith quoted William Wilberforce, an 18th-century British abolitionist, saying, "Having heard all of this you may choose to look the other way ... but you may never again say that you did not know."

The Assembly of Manitoba Chiefs voiced its support for Smith's proposal. Ron Evans, the assembly's Grand Chief, said that Smith's recommendations "bring attention to the fact that most vulnerable victims of domestic human trafficking and sexual exploitation are First Nations youth." Ottawa Victim Services executive director Steve Sullivan commended Smith and Perrin on their development of the proposal. Timea Nagy, a former human trafficking victim and the founder of Walk With Me (an organization that supports human trafficking victims in Toronto), said that she "felt a huge amount of relief" when she heard about the proposed NAP-CHT, and said, "It's time for Canada to have a National Action Plan to Combat Human Trafficking."

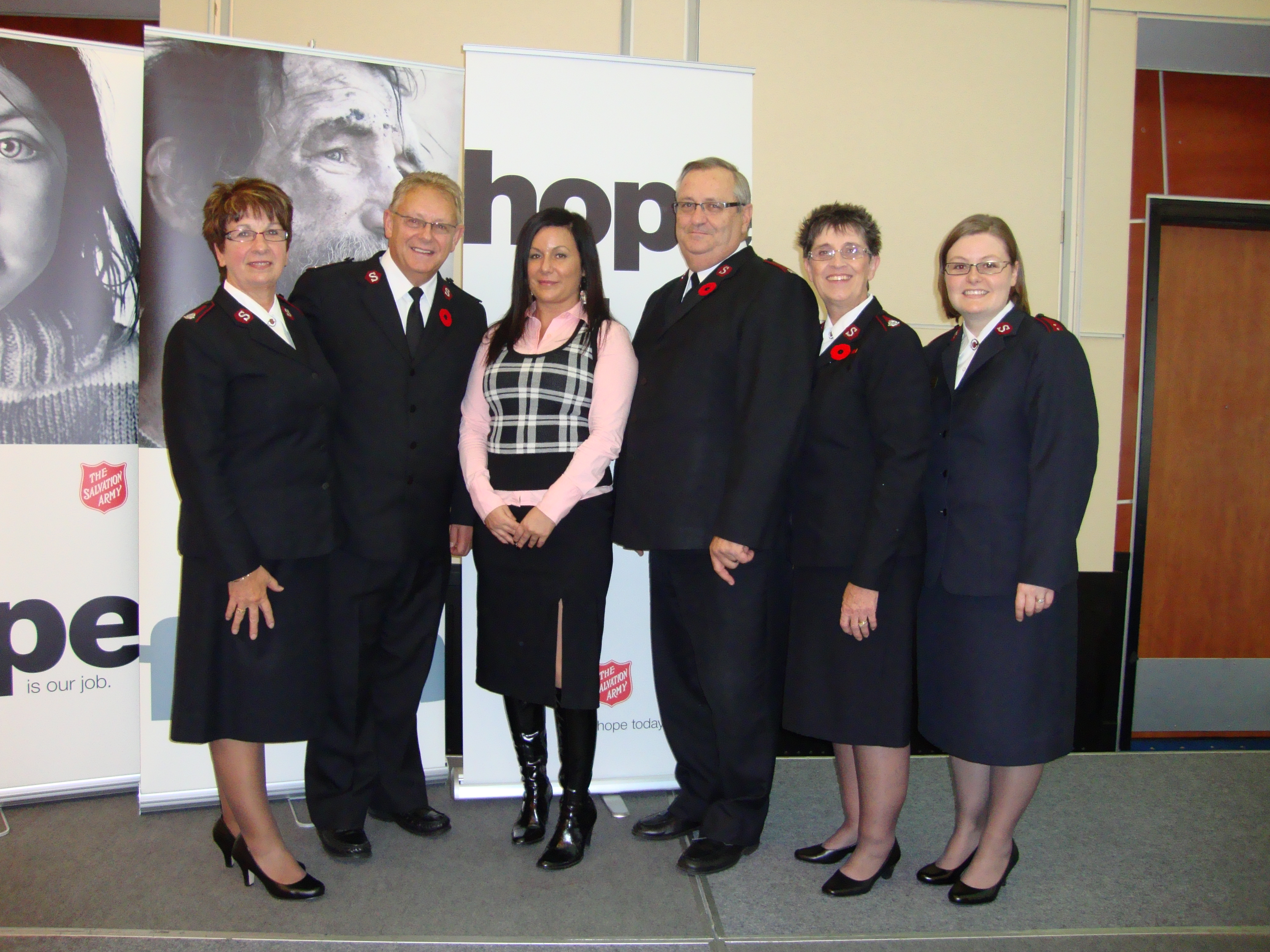
The Salvation Army made recommendations for the NAP-CHT and was consulted by the government in the plan's development (Salvation Army officers pictured with Natasha Falle).

Eventually, Smith submitted "Connecting the Dots" to Harper. (Note: Sources do not specify when the proposal was submitted to Harper, but it was no earlier than February 2007 and no later than April 2012.) In March 2012, she spoke about her proposal at a human-trafficking-themed conference hosted by the Sisters of Loretto at St. Michael's College. Smith circulated a petition requesting that the House of Commons establish an anti-human-trafficking national action plan. The Office for Systemic Justice, which is part of the Canadian Federation of Sisters of St. Joseph, released a report responding to "Connecting the Dots", commending Smith on her work and recommending that her proposal incorporate the Delphi Indicators of Human Trafficking, based on the Delphi method. Additional recommendations for the plan were submitted by International Justice Mission (IJM) Canada, World Vision, the Alliance Against Modern Slavery (AAMS), Beyond Borders, The Salvation Army, Not for Sale Canada, the Evangelical Fellowship of Canada (EFC), ACT Alberta, and other NGOs.

== Criticism of Canada for lacking such a plan ==
Before the establishment of the National Action Plan, a variety of people and organizations—including First Nations, human trafficking victims, law enforcement, and victim service providers—criticized Canada for failing to have such a plan. Charles Momy, president of the Canadian Police Association, said that despite existing efforts from local law enforcement agencies, Canada lacked and required "a coordinated response to ensure the offenders are prosecuted, and put a stop to this modern day form of slavery." In October 2008, John Fenn of Toronto's Streetlight Support Services expressed his frustration that there was still no national action plan on this subject despite the passing of the corresponding motion the previous year. Fenn said, "Even if we make a muck of the thing if we get started, let's get started." Benjamín Santamaria of Project Desert Roses, another Toronto-based organization, voiced the same complaint.

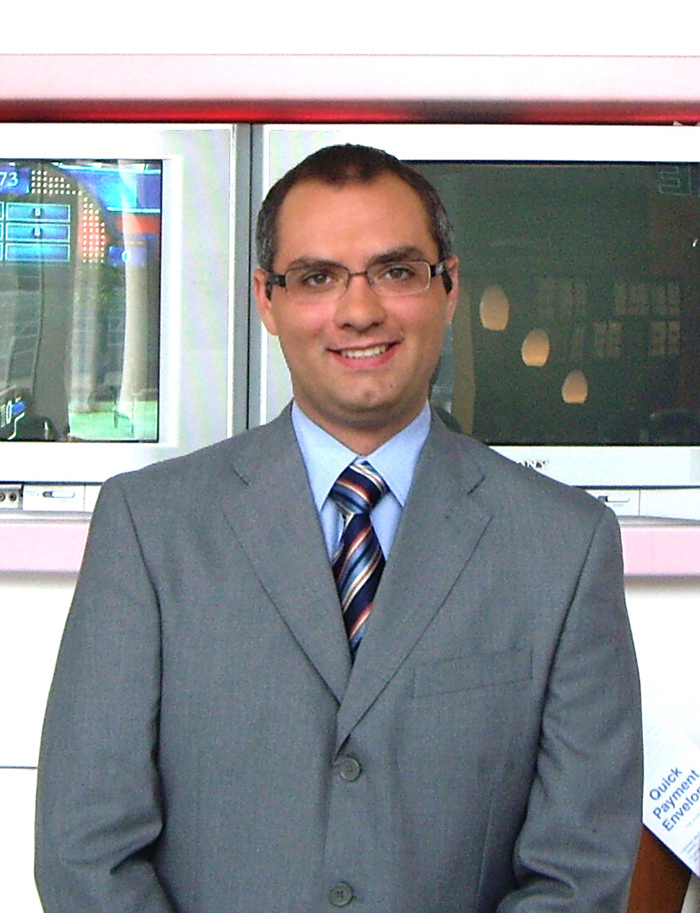
Before the NAP-CHT was established, University of British Columbia law professor Benjamin Perrin said that, "while traffickers have a plan, Canada doesn't."

In 2009, the United States Department of State annual Trafficking in Persons (TIP) Report was released at a news conference at the American consulate in Vancouver; it criticized the Government of Canada for failing to have a national action plan to address human trafficking. At the conference, Perrin, who was named in the report as one of the world's ten anti-human-trafficking heroes, called for Harper "to announce that he will enact a national action plan to combat human trafficking to follow up on the measures that his government has already taken." Perrin said that Canada's lack of a plan made the country look bad internationally and prevents the issue from being adequately addressed. Perrin said that the establishment of a national action plan on this issue "should be a priority for our federal government to end this atrocious crime that is flourishing in Canada." He wrote the book Invisible Chains: Canada's Underground World of Human Trafficking and said that a national anti-human-trafficking plan is necessary if the country is to be free and just. Perrin said that his book, which was published within three weeks of the release of "Connecting the Dots", "shows that while traffickers have a plan, Canada doesn't."

The 2010 TIP report also condemned Canada's lack of a national action plan, and said that Canada is a destination, source, and transit country for forced prostitution, unfree labour, the prostitution of children, and other forms of human trafficking. The report said that the federal and provincial governments of Canada were not cooperating sufficiently with respect to policing these crimes, and that a strategy for cooperation should be formulated in a national action plan. York Regional Police vice unit Detective Thai Truong agreed with the report's assessment, and said that "a unified understanding and approach" to human trafficking "does not even exist at the municipal level of policing" in Canada. Also in 2010, retired Toronto Police Service officer Dave Perry said that Canada's lack of a national action plan had resulted in the country failing to adequately deal with North Preston's Finest, a gang that engages in sex trafficking between Nova Scotia and Toronto. Perry had led a police taskforce against the gang in the late 1980s and early 1990s, but he said that without a national action plan, politicians lost interest in the endeavour and funding ran out. Perry stated that a plan would need to be well-funded because traffickers in Canada are making "big, big money ... and the only way you can combat that is with a pretty healthy budget."

York University professor Natalya Timoshkina, who was part of two research studies about human trafficking in Canada, said that the United States was combatting human trafficking much more effectively than Canada was. Timoshkina said that Canada's responses to human trafficking have been sporadic and that, even if a national action plan was implemented, Canada needed to begin engaging with other countries on this issue. In February 2011, Shae Invidiata of Free-Them—a Canadian organization that raises awareness about human trafficking—said it was "mind blowing [that] currently we do not have a national action plan to combat human trafficking in Canada."

== Preparations by the federal government ==
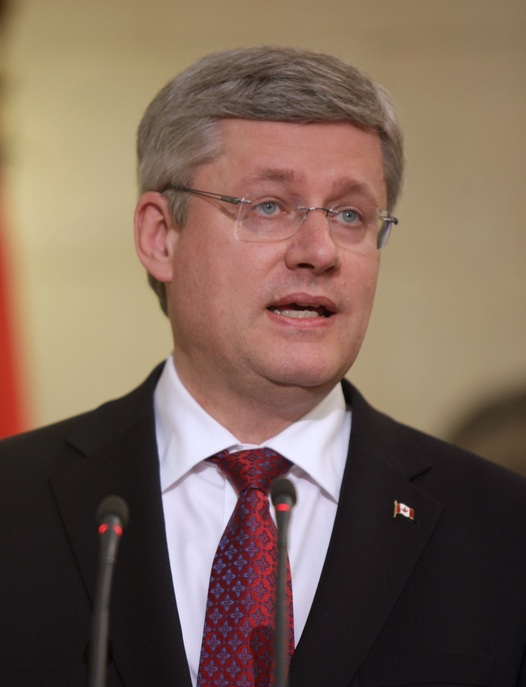
Stephen Harper, Prime Minister of Canada, promised during the 2011 Canadian federal election that he would establish the NAP-CHT by 2012, and he did.

During the 2011 Canadian federal election, Harper promised to establish the NAP-CHT by 2012 and to invest $20 million into it. The annual budget of British Columbia's Office to Combat Trafficking in Persons (OCTIP) was reduced by $200,000 a few months later. OCTIP was Canada's only provincial government agency responsible for coordinating efforts to address human trafficking. The federal government held a round table to determine the contents of the NAP-CHT. Carleen McGuinty, child protection specialist for the Christian NGO World Vision Canada, said at the discussion that the NAP-CHT should focus on the needs of children and that the plan should not emphasize child sexual abuse to the exclusion of addressing child labour. Smith said that she was confident that Harper would have her review the plan before it was established. The government consulted ACT Alberta, The Salvation Army, and the AAMS in the development of the plan.

== Establishment ==
=== Announcement ===
The plan was established by the Government of Canada on June 6, 2012, with a four-year budget of $25 million, $500,000 of which was to be used for supporting victims. The establishment was announced simultaneously in three Canadian cities. Smith made the announcement in Vancouver. In Ottawa, the announcement was made by Rona Ambrose, Minister responsible for the Status of Women and Minister of Public Works and Government Services; and Vic Toews, Minister of Public Safety. Steven Blaney, Minister of Veterans Affairs, was the announcer in Montreal.

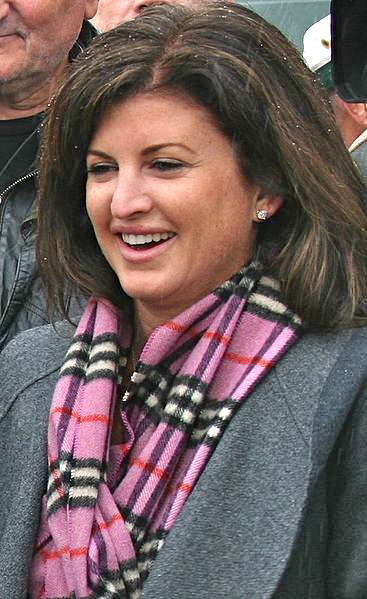
Rona Ambrose, Minister responsible for the Status of Women, called the NAP-CHT an "important step to ensure the safety and security of women and girls across Canada".

Ambrose called the plan an "important step to ensure the safety and security of women and girls across Canada who are being targeted for sexual exploitation by violent traffickers". Toews said that the need to establish the NAP-CHT was demonstrated by the ongoing legal proceedings regarding the Domotor-Kolompar criminal organization, Canada's largest human trafficking case to date. Smith said that the plan was an important step in the process of increasing the number of human-trafficking-related cases that go before court. Smith said that the NAP-CHT would not be independently sufficient to end human trafficking in the country because this crime can only be effectively combatted when the country's citizens are united against it; she therefore recommended the establishment of a National Human Trafficking Awareness Day on February 22 to help raise awareness.

=== Contents ===
The plan states that human trafficking "is often described as a modern form of slavery," but that no one knows how prevalent it is in Canada. The NAP-CHT also says that women and girls are the most common victims of human trafficking. Randy Hoback, MP for Prince Albert, Saskatchewan, said that the goals of the action plan included "enhancing the response of law enforcement and the justice system to cases of missing and murdered Aboriginal women and girls and supporting culturally appropriate victim's services." The NAP-CHT document states that there had been 25 human-trafficking-specific convictions in Canada prior to April 2012, and that 41 people had been victims of those 25 crimes.

The plan's recommendations are divided into four categories called the "4 Ps": partnership, prevention, prosecution, and protection. Included in the plan are action items with measurable goals. The plan encompasses support for victims, the increase of law enforcement across the country, and the consolidation of existing anti-human-trafficking efforts. The plan also outlines novel initiatives to more effectively prosecute perpetrators, identify and protect their victims, prevent further crimes, and engage in international partnership. There is a specific commitment to participate in international child protection. The NAP-CHT instituted the Human Trafficking Taskforce, chaired by Public Safety Canada and mandated with coordinating the plan's implementation and the generation of annual progress reports, which were to be made publicly available. This taskforce replaced the IWG-TIP, which had been tasked solely with information sharing. The new taskforce involves 18 federal government departments. Public Safety Canada called the NAP-CHT "a comprehensive blueprint to guide the Government of Canada's fight against the serious crime of human trafficking."

It introduced training for police officers and anti-human-trafficking service providers in communities that are particularly susceptible to human trafficking. The plan also includes an increase in training for prosecutors, border guards, and judges. The plan launched a nationally integrated law enforcement team tasked specifically with combatting human trafficking, the first of its kind in Canada. The team combines the forces of the Royal Canadian Mounted Police (RCMP), CBSA, and local police. Due to difficulties encountered by Canadian law enforcement when investigating human trafficking before the establishment of the NAP-CHT, this model of law enforcement integration, emulating successful teams combatting human trafficking in the United States, was included. This law enforcement integration model is intended to optimize information sharing and facilitate proactive investigation. The NAP-CHT allocates substantial funds to the RCMP Human Trafficking National Coordination Centre (HTNCC), which is based in Ottawa.

Also included in the plan is an outline for raising awareness about human trafficking across Canada. The plan specifically mentions TruckSTOP, a campaign of Persons Against the Crime of Trafficking in Humans Ottawa, as being integral to the plan. According to the plan, the CBSA is responsible for informing foreigners about human trafficking because of their increased vulnerability. The plan includes a provision for the government to partner with NGOs that oppose human trafficking. Although Smith said that human trafficking would be more effectively combatted if Canada's prostitution laws were reformed to align with those of Sweden, criminalizing the purchasing rather than the selling of sex, the NAP-CHT does not make such legislative recommendations. The plan enables immigration officers to issue temporary residence permits to foreigners victimized by human trafficking in Canada, thereby providing these victims with opportunities to receive aid.

=== Implementation ===
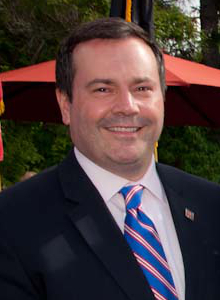
Jason Kenney, Minister of Citizenship and Immigration, said in 2012 that he hoped that Canada's new policy of not allowing the country's sex industry to employ foreign workers would strengthen the NAP-CHT.

The plan came into force on June 28, 2012. After the establishment of the national action plan, British Columbia established a provincial action plan informed by the national one to coordinate its anti-human-trafficking efforts with the federal government's. OCTIP then became involved in implementing the national and provincial action plans. The provincial action plan, published in March 2013, states that contributing to development of the NAP-CHT through consultation and information sharing was an immediate priority.

The month after the plan took effect, the Canadian government announced that the country's sex industry would no longer be allowed to employ foreign workers because of the risks of exploitation, abuse, and trafficking in that environment. As part of this policy, the Department of Citizenship and Immigration Canada stopped issuing new temporary work permits for foreigners seeking work with escort agencies, massage parlours, and strip clubs. Jason Kenney, Minister of Citizenship and Immigration, said that he hoped that the NAP-CHT would be strengthened by this new policy, and said that its purpose was to protect foreigners "from what they might not know will happen to them when they get to Canada." That November, Status of Women Canada sought to support the NAP-CHT by soliciting the public for proposals of how to best support community organizations that serve female victims of sex trafficking—the most common victims of this form of trafficking. In late 2012, Smith launched the Joy Smith Foundation as a follow-up to the NAP-CHT; this nonpartisan, apolitical foundation is dedicated to raising awareness about human trafficking and providing support to human trafficking victims with counselling, housing, and clothing.

The Canadian government spent more than $6 million on actions related to the NAP-CHT in 2013. In September of that year, Kellie Leitch, Minister responsible for the Status of Women and Minister of Labour, announced that the government would give the Women's Support Network of York Region $200,000 to initiate a project aimed at eradicating human trafficking in the Regional Municipality of York, and she appealed to the NAP-CHT when making the announcement. In February 2013, the Toronto City Council decided to coordinate its anti-human-trafficking efforts with the NAP-CHT. That May, during a meeting of the sixty-seventh session of the United Nations General Assembly at United Nations Headquarters in New York City that was convened to discuss the Global Plan of Action to Combat Trafficking in Persons, the Canadian delegation spoke about the NAP-CHT.

== Reactions ==
=== To the plan's establishment ===
The establishment of the plan was received positively by many Canadian NGOs and law enforcement officials. Within a day of its establishment, the plan had received support from the parents of human trafficking victims. Glendene Grant, mother of missing human trafficking victim Jessie Foster, said, "From the bottom of my heart, I would like to thank the government of Canada for their development and launch of the Canadian National Action Plan to Combat the Crime of Human Trafficking, making our country one of the leaders in the fight against this crime." Around the same time, the EFC voiced its support for the plan, specifically praising the commitments to create a national human trafficking law enforcement taskforce, to raise awareness, to invest in prevention, to care for victims, and to consult with stakeholders on an ongoing basis. The EFC's policy analyst Julia Beazley said that the organization was "particularly pleased with the proposals aimed at combatting sexual exploitation, and with the focus given to our Aboriginal communities, which are particularly vulnerable to trafficking."

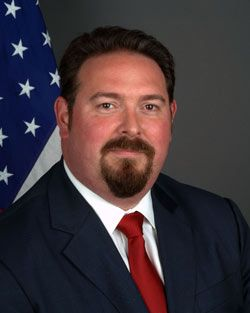
United States Ambassador-at-Large to Monitor and Combat Trafficking in Persons Luis CdeBaca said that the NAP-CHT shows "the international community what an effective anti-trafficking strategy looks like."

Luis CdeBaca, United States Ambassador-at-Large to Monitor and Combat Trafficking in Persons, said, "With the announcement of a new national action plan, Canada is showing the international community what an effective anti-trafficking strategy looks like." Nagy said that she was "absolutely thrilled" with the establishment of the plan. Invidiata said that she and many others "stand proud to be Canadian" because of the announcement of the NAP-CHT's "important measures to protect our women and children in Canada." Natasha Falle, founder and director of Sex Trade 101, said that, as an organization of sex trafficking victims, they were extremely pleased with the establishment of the NAP-CHT. She said that she and the other members of Sex Trade 101 "have been collectively afraid, raped, beaten, sold, discarded [so] we are forever grateful to MP Joy Smith for being a voice for those who are not allowed to speak out."

Brian Venables, Divisional Secretary for Public Relations and Development for the British Columbia Division of The Salvation Army, said, "We welcome a plan that enhances the support for the victims of these horrible crimes ... and are pleased to have been part of the plan's development." He also praised the plan's outline of how to educate the public on the subject of human trafficking and how the police and the judiciary should cooperate on the subject. Brian McConaghy of Ratanak International said that he was pleased to see the NAP-CHT established and that the plan's framework is necessary to protect those at risk of being trafficked. Sister Nancy Brown of Covenant House British Columbia said that her organization was in support of the NAP-CHT and Smith's efforts to combat human trafficking. The Servants Anonymous Society's chief financial officer, Dominique Machefert, said that her organization "applauds the Conservative Government for taking the issue of human trafficking seriously and for executing the necessary steps to enact the National Action Plan to Combat Human Trafficking."

A common criticism of the plan is that it is not victim-centric and that its support for victims is insufficient. Bethany Hastie of McGill University said that the HTNCC had a good track record of intelligence assessment and awareness-raising with respect to human trafficking, and she therefore approved of the plan's funding of the HTNCC. She was critical of the plan's emphasis on law enforcement, saying that "the crime-fighting focus of the plan has unfortunately detracted from ... victim services." She said that more attention to victim services was necessary because most Canadian provinces were employing only ad-hoc methods of supporting victims, often omitting important elements such as legal aid and situation-appropriate shelter. A few weeks after the establishment of the NAP-CHT, Dean Allison, MP for Niagara West—Glanbrook, Ontario travelled to Cambodia and Thailand to learn more about human trafficking as part of a parliamentary delegation with World Vision Canada, and he said that his meetings there convinced him "that we are on the right track in Canada with our National Action Plan."

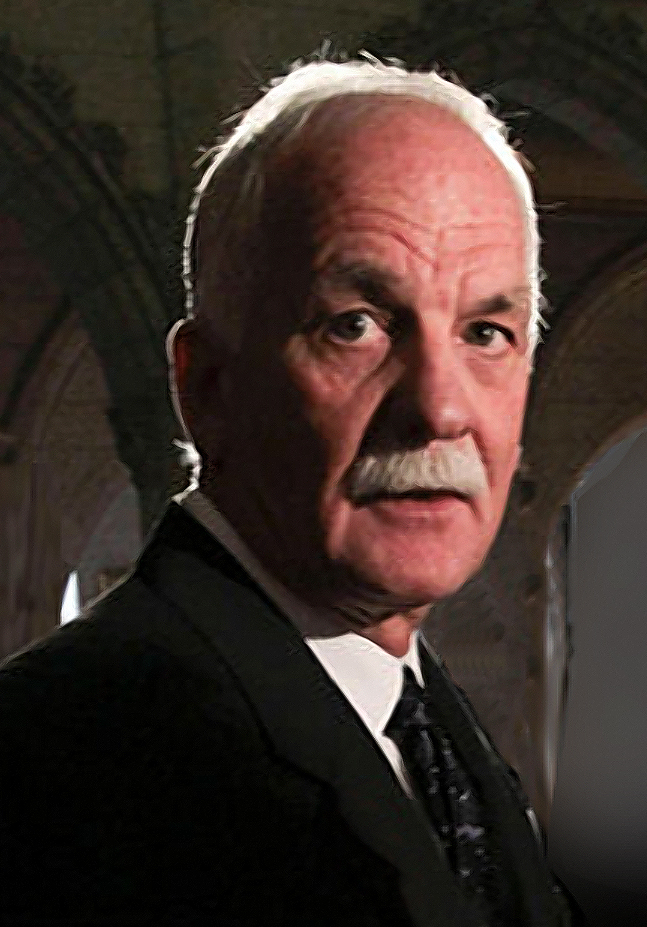
UNICEF Canada recommended that Canadians write to Minister of Public Safety Vic Toews to ensure that youth and children would be the plans's foremost priorities.

In October 2012, the Canadian Coalition for the Rights of Children (CCRC) said that it approved of Canada's adoption of the plan, but was reserving judgement on whether the new Human Trafficking Taskforce would be more effective than the body it replaced. The CCRC criticized the NAP-CHT for including "few specific strategies for children and no mention of strengthening respect for children's rights as part of prevention." The CCRC also said that the NAP-CHT lacks recognition of the responsibilities Canada has according to the Optional Protocol on the Sale of Children, Child Prostitution and Child Pornography. The coalition therefore recommended that the plan be amended to include mandatory sentencing for traffickers of children, and to provide for collaboration with youth organizations.

Also in October 2012, Jamie McIntosh of IJM Canada said that his organization supports the NAP-CHT, and that the plan's promises to participate in international child protection would be best fulfilled by apprehending and prosecuting Canadians who engage in child sex tourism and child trafficking in other countries. McIntosh recommended that this work be focused on Cambodia, the Dominican Republic, Mexico, the Philippines, and Thailand because these countries are particularly vulnerable to Canadian traffickers. He also recommended focusing on these countries because Canadians have been caught participating in child sex tourism there; McIntosh made specific reference to the cases of Kenneth Klassen and Donald Bakker.

In response to the plan, Chab Dai Canada initiated the Canadian Freedom Registry Project "to promote and enable the implementation of ... Canada’s National Action Plan to Combat Human Trafficking ... focusing specifically on partnership." Chab Dai sought to research ways to improve anti-human-trafficking activities in Canada and to facilitate information sharing between anti-human-trafficking organisations and the federal and provincial governments. In April 2013, a troika of the Office of the United Nations High Commissioner for Human Rights composed of Brazil, the Philippines, and the Republic of Ireland released a report reviewing Canada as part of that year's Universal Periodic Review; the report highlighted the establishment of the NAP-CHT as a positive achievement. UNICEF Canada approved of the establishment of the NAP-CHT, and encouraged Canadians to write letters to politicians asking them to make sure that youth and children are the plan's foremost priorities. The politicians UNICEF recommended that people write to Harper, Toews, Kenney, and Rob Nicholson, the Minister of Justice.

=== To the plan's implementation ===
A month after the plan's establishment, Public Service Alliance of Canada Prairies Regional Executive Vice-president Marianne Hladun wrote an open letter to Brad Trost, MP for Saskatoon—Humboldt, saying that, while she approved of the NAP-CHT, the government was being inconsistent in its treatment of human trafficking because it had recently announced that it would be eliminating four CBSA intelligence officer positions, thereby dismissing four people who were already doing effective anti-human-trafficking work. When it was announced that foreign workers would no longer be issued permits for work in Canada's sex industry, Tim Lambrinos, leader of the Adult Entertainment Association of Canada, said that he might challenge the policy because he believed that "strip clubs are a very safe environment" and that the government was "destroying an industry [and] creating a labour shortage." At Toronto's third annual Walk for Freedom in September 2012, Shae Invidiata criticized the NAP-CHT for allotting only $500,000 to victim services, saying, "I'm very grateful, but we need more." Smith also said that the $500,000 allotted to support victims was insufficient. She said that many of these organizations "still struggle to provide basic care for victims of human trafficking" and that there should be a "considerable increase in support from the federal and provincial governments for these organizations."

In June 2013, on the first anniversary of the plan's establishment, a variety of NGOs released a joint report about the NAP-CHT. In this report, Don Hutchinson, vice president of the EFC, said that "continuing focused implementation of the Action Plan is essential to Canadians doing our part to put an end to this travesty." Michael Maidment, director of federal government relations for The Salvation Army, wrote that the plan was important and sends a message to traffickers about the government's commitment to end human trafficking. Andrea Burkhart, on behalf of ACT Alberta, wrote that victim support funding needed to increase. Karlee Sapoznik, president of the AAMS, criticized the NAP-CHT for ignoring the country's "crucial lack of research and data," writing that "we need sustained research on the nature of human trafficking within and involving Canada." Nonetheless, she said that her organization was pleased to have been consulted in the development of the plan.

That July, Stefan Lehmeier, a World Vision Canada Senior Policy Advisor for Child Protection, said that World Vision was pleased with the establishment of the NAP-CHT and with Canadian politicians' level of interest in the plan. He said that "there has been progress in combating human trafficking" as a result of the NAP-CHT, but he criticized the country for not doing more with the new information that the plan has exposed, saying that "we haven't seen the number of convictions we wanted to see." Lehmeier said that the RCMP should collaborate more with law enforcement agencies in Southeast Asia to address the issue of Canadians participating in sex tourism there.

In September, Jennifer Lucking of Walk With Me encouraged Canadians to write to their members of parliament to make sure that the promises outlined in the plan come to fruition. In preparation for 2013 Walk for Freedom, Invidiata said she was glad that the NAP-CHT had come into existence, but that the related funds should be released in a different way.

== Bibliography ==
- "BC's Action Plan to Combat Human Trafficking" (PDF). British Columbia Ministry of Justice. March 2013.
- "Optional Protocol to the Convention on the Rights of the Child on the Sale of Children, Child Prostitution, and Child Pornography" (PDF). Canadian Coalition for the Rights of Children. October 5, 2012. Archived from the original (PDF) on October 22, 2013.
