= Slavery in Canada =

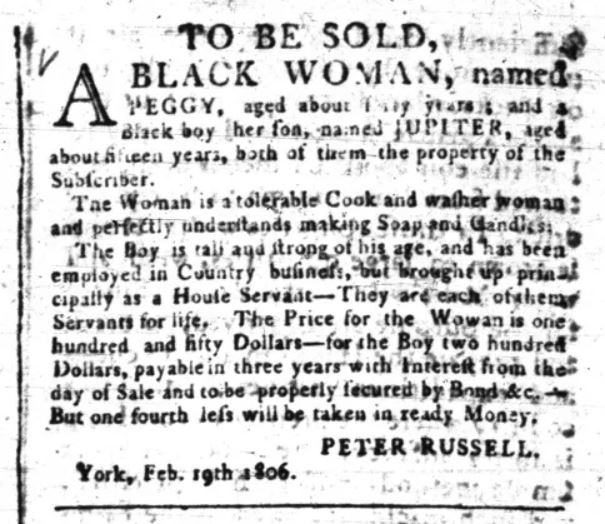
Advertisement for the sale of two enslaved people in the Upper Canada Gazette, 10 February 1806

Slavery in Canada includes historical practices of enslavement practised both by the First Nations until the latter half of the 19th century, and by colonists during the period of European colonization.

The practice of slavery in Canada by colonists effectively ended early in the 19th century, through local statutes and court decisions resulting from litigation on behalf of enslaved people seeking manumission. The courts, to varying degrees, rendered slavery unenforceable in both Lower Canada and Nova Scotia. In Lower Canada, for example, after court decisions in the late 1790s, the "slave could not be compelled to serve longer than he would, and ... might leave his master at will." Upper Canada passed the Act Against Slavery in 1793, one of the earliest anti-slavery acts in the world. These developments in Canada preceded Britain's decision to ban slavery through most of the British Empire by passing the Slavery Abolition Act 1833.

As slavery in the United States continued until the passage of the Thirteenth Amendment in 1865, black people (free and enslaved) began immigrating to Canada from the United States after the American Revolution and again after the War of 1812, and later many by way of the Underground Railroad.

Because Canada's role in the Atlantic slave trade was comparatively limited, the history of Black slavery in Canada is often overshadowed by the more tumultuous slavery practised elsewhere in the Americas.

== Under Indigenous rule ==
Slave-owning people of what became Canada were, for example, the fishing societies such as the Yurok, that lived along the Pacific coast from Alaska to California, on what is sometimes described as the Pacific or Northern Northwest Coast. Some of the indigenous peoples of the Pacific Northwest Coast, such as the Haida and Tlingit, were traditionally known as fierce warriors and slave-traders, raiding as far as California. Slavery was hereditary, the slaves being prisoners of war and their descendants were slaves. In what became British Columbia, slavery was flourishing in the 1830s, gradually declining throughout the century. In the 1870s, the Superintendent of Indian Affairs, Israel Wood Powell, freed slaves on their appeal to him during his trips to the west coast of Vancouver Island. Slavery had virtually ended by the 1880s and 1890s. Some First Nations in British Columbia continued to segregate and ostracize the descendants of slaves as late as the 1970s. Among a few Pacific Northwest nations about a quarter of the population were slaves.

One slave narrative was composed by an Englishman, John R. Jewitt. He had been taken alive when his ship was captured in 1802 by the Nuu-chah-nulth people due to the ship's captain having insulted their chief, Maquinna, and other slights inflicted against their people by other American and European captains. Jewitt's memoir provides a detailed look at life as a slave.

== Under European colonization ==
The Maritimes saw 1,200 to 2,000 slaves arrive prior to abolition, with 300 accounted for in Lower Canada, and between 500 and 700 in Upper Canada. A small portion of Black Canadians today are descended from these slaves.

Africans were forcibly captured by local chiefs and kings as chattel slaves and sold to traders bound for southern areas of the Americas. Those in what is now called Canada typically came from the American colonies, as no shiploads of human chattel went to Canada directly from Africa. There were no large plantations in Canada, and therefore no demand for a large slave work force of the sort that existed in most European colonies in the Americas.

=== Under French rule ===
Under French rule, First Nations slaves outnumbered slaves of African descent. According to Afua Cooper, author of The Hanging of Angélique: The Untold Story of Canadian Slavery and the Burning of Old Montréal, this was due to the relative ease with which New France could acquire First Nations slaves. She noted that the mortality of slaves was high, with the average age of First Nations slaves only 17, and the average age of slaves of African descent, 25. One of the first recorded black slaves in Canada was brought by a British convoy to New France in 1628. Olivier le Jeune was the name given to the boy, originally from Madagascar.

By 1688, New France's population was 11,562 people, made up primarily of fur traders, missionaries, and farmers settled in the St. Lawrence Valley. To help overcome its severe shortage of servants and laborers, King Louis XIV granted New France's petition to import black slaves from West Africa. Though no shipments ever arrived from Africa, colonists did acquire some black slaves from other French and British colonies. From the late 1600s, they also acquired Indigenous slaves, mostly from what is now the U.S. Midwestern states, through their western fur-trade networks. Slaves of Indigenous origin were called "Panis", but few came from the Pawnee tribe. More commonly, they were of Fox, Dakota, Iowa, and Apache origin, captives taken in war by Indigenous allies and trading partners of the French.

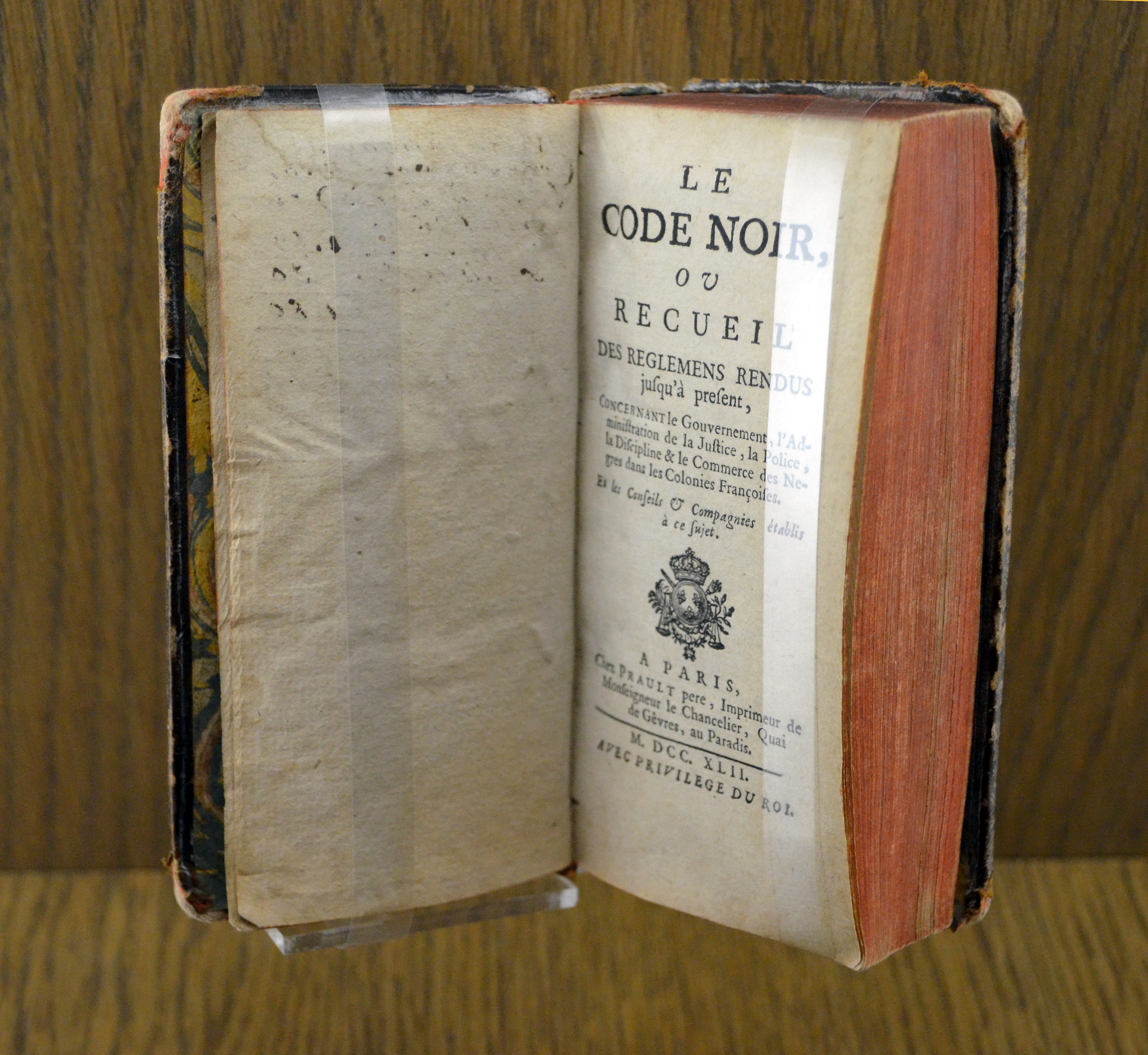
Code Noir of 1742, Nantes history museum

While slavery was prohibited in France, it was permitted in its colonies as a means of providing the massive labor force needed to clear land, construct buildings and (in the Caribbean colonies) work on sugar, indigo and tobacco plantations. The 1685 Code Noir set the pattern for policing slavery in the West Indies. It required that all slaves be instructed as Catholics and not as Protestants. It concentrated on defining the condition of slavery, and established harsh controls. Slaves had virtually no rights, though the Code did enjoin masters to take care of the sick and old. The Code Noir does not seem to have applied to Canada and so, in 1709, the intendant Jacques Raudot issued an ordinance officially recognizing slavery in New France; slavery existed before that date, but only as of 1709 was it instituted in law.

In total, by Marcel Trudel's count, 1,685 Native American slaves and 402 black slaves appeared in the records during French rule, for a total of 2,087 slaves. After the Conquest of New France by the British, slave ownership remained dominated by the French. Trudel identified 1,509 slave owners, of which only 181 were English. Trudel also noted 31 marriages took place between French colonists and Indigenous slaves.

=== Under British rule ===
External videos
- Chloe Cooley; A Canadian Heritage Minute that follows Chloe Cooley, an enslaved Black woman in Upper Canada in 1793. Her acts of resistance in the face of violence led to Canada’s first legislation limiting slavery.– Historica Canada (1:01 min)

First Nations owned or traded in slaves, an institution that had existed for centuries or longer among certain groups. Shawnee, Potawatomi, and other western tribes imported slaves from Ohio and Kentucky and sold or gifted them to allies and Canadian settlers. Mohawk Chief Thayendenaga (Joseph Brant) used black people he had captured during the American Revolution to build Brant House at Burlington Beach and a second home near Brantford. In all, Brant owned about forty black slaves.

Black slaves lived in the British regions of Canada in the 18th century—104 were listed in a 1767 census of Nova Scotia, but their numbers were small until the Expulsion of the Loyalists. As white Loyalists fled the new American Republic, they took with them more than 2,000 black slaves: at least 1,500 to the Maritimes (Nova Scotia, New Brunswick, and Prince Edward Island), 300 to Lower Canada (Quebec), and 500 to Upper Canada (Ontario). In Ontario, the Imperial act of Parliament of 1790 assured prospective immigrants that their slaves would remain their property. As under French rule, Loyalist slaves were held in small numbers and were used as domestic servants, farm hands, and skilled artisans after being educated and trained by their Masters.

Following the Battle of the Plains of Abraham and the British conquest of New France, the subject of slavery in Canada is unmentioned—neither banned nor permitted—in both the Treaty of Paris of 1763 and the Quebec Act of 1774 or the Treaty of Paris of 1783.

The system of gang labor, and its consequent institutions of control and brutality, did not develop in Canada as it did in some parts of the United States. Because they did not appear to pose a threat to their masters, slaves were permitted to learn to read and write, Christian conversion was encouraged, and their marriages were recognized by law.

==== Lower Canada ====
The end of slavery in Lower Canada cannot be precisely dated, and was a gradual process. Early as 1787, slave owners became anxious about the more or less imminent abolition of slavery.

Newspaper published on slavery starting in July 1790, with the anti-slavery campaign gaining strength on summer of 1791. This coverage, however, was temporary, and mainly focused on slavery as a foreign phenomenon.

On January 28, 1793, the question of whether slavery should be abolished or kept was brought up in the Legislative Assembly by Pierre-Louis Panet (as "a bill [...] to abolish slavery"). On March 8, there was the first reading of the bill; on April 19, there was the second reading of the bill and Panet moved for the creation of a Committee of the Whole House on the bill on the 25th. However, Pierre-Amable Debonne proposed adjourning debate on the subject in a destructive amendment and was seconded by George McBeath : the amendment passed by a wide margin (31 to 3). This failed bill revealed opponents of slavery in the House: Pierre-Louis Panet, Bonaventure Panet, Amable Berthelot and Louis Dunière.

A precedent was set in 1794 when a judge (Note: The judge's identity is unknown; possibly not Osgoode, considering he was only appointed Chief of Justice of King's Bench on December 11, 1794.) freed a slave brought to trial, claiming that slavery was unknown to the laws of England (a highly debatable statement). The Chief of Justice William Osgoode, appointed in 1794, did not recognize slavery and systematically freed all slaves that appeared in court sued as slaves. The Chief Justice's refusal to acknowledge slavery, alongside the Legislative Assembly's refusal to pronounce itself, led to the mass desertions of slaves.The Legislative Assembly's indecision also led to slaves deserting from other provinces and the United States, even before the legislature acted in Upper Canada to limit slavery. After a slave was freed in such a manner in 1798, the slave population apparently threatened a general revolt.

The Chief Justice Sir James Monk, not recognizing the legality of slavery based on a technicality regarding the absence of houses of correction, rendered a series of decisions undermining the ability to compel slaves to serve their masters in the late 1790s : the slave no longer had to obey his master and could leave at will. He systematically dismissed suits by owners against runaway slaves. Monk's interpretation held, even once houses of correction were established.

The last sale of a slave was in 1797. The next year, the last newspaper ad selling a slave appeared in the Montreal Gazette and the word "slave" last appeared in the civil registries.

Starting in 1799, slave owners petitioned the Legislative Assembly to legislate on the matters of slavery to remove all uncertainties regarding its status (by abolishing it, upholding it, regulating it and/or limiting it; depending on the petition). All attempts eventually stalled and failed (1799, 1800 and 1803), and no further attempts were made after 1803. The subject of slavery was never raised again in the Legislative Assembly after 1803.

After 1799, only nineteen slaves remained in the records; only one of those appeared after 1808 (in 1821).By the time the Slavery Abolition Act of 1833 came into force, slavery had practically disappeared on its own in Lower Canada, with perhaps only a few old black slaves being freed by the legislation.

In 1829, the administrator of Lower Canada Sir James Kempt refused a request form the U.S. government to return an escaped slave, on the basis that fugitives must only be given up when the crime in question was also a crime in Lower Canada.

In total, 787 Native American slaves and 730 black slaves appeared in the records, for a total of 1,527 slaves.

==== Upper Canada ====
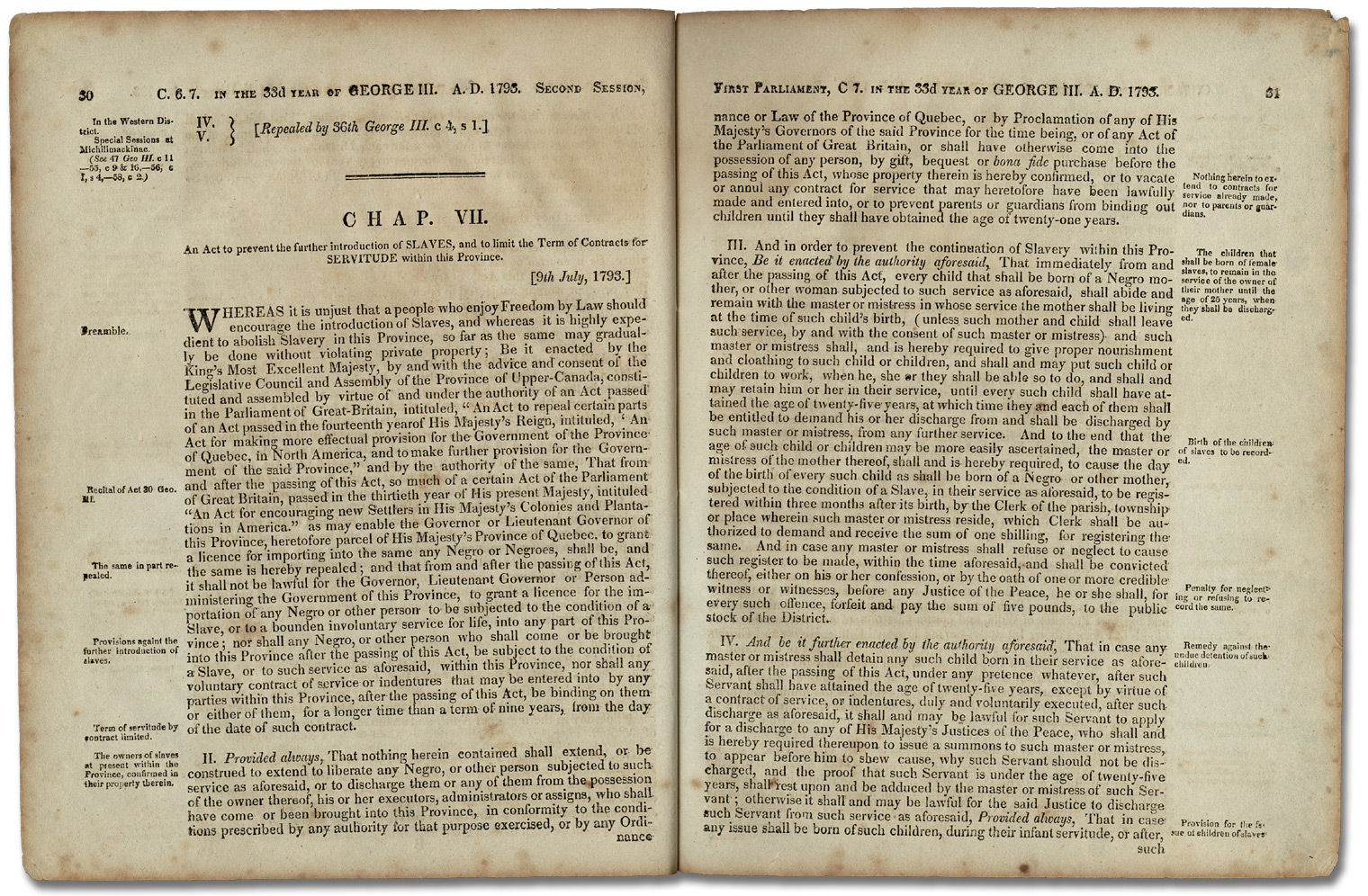
An Act to Prevent the further Introduction of Slaves and to limit the Term of Contracts for Servitude within this Province, Parliament of Upper Canada, 1793

By 1790, the abolition movement was gaining credence in Canada and the ill intent of slavery was evidenced by an incident involving a slave woman being violently abused by her slave owner on her way to being sold in the United States. In 1793, Chloe Cooley, in an act of defiance yelled out screams of resistance. The abuse committed by her slave owner and her violent resistance was witnessed by Peter Martin and William Grisely. Peter Martin, a former slave, brought the incident to the attention of Lieutenant Governor John Graves Simcoe. Under the auspices of Simcoe, the Act Against Slavery of 1793 was legislated. The elected members of the executive council, many of whom were merchants or farmers who depended on slave labor, saw no need for emancipation. Attorney-General John White later wrote that there was "much opposition but little argument" to his measure. Finally the Assembly passed the Act Against Slavery that legislated the gradual abolition of slavery: no slaves could be imported; slaves already in the province would remain enslaved until death, no new slaves could be brought into Upper Canada, and children born to female slaves would be slaves but must be freed at age 25. To discourage manumission, the Act required the master to provide security that the former slave would not become a public charge. The compromise Act Against Slavery stands as the only attempt by any Ontario legislature to act against slavery. This legal rule ensured the eventual end of slavery in Upper Canada, although as it diminished the sale value of slaves within the province it also resulted in slaves being sold to the United States. In 1798 there was an attempt by lobby groups to rectify the legislation and import more slaves. Slaves discovered they could gain freedom by escaping to Ohio and Michigan in the United States.

By 1800, the other provinces of British North America had effectively limited slavery through court decisions requiring the strictest proof of ownership, which was rarely available. In 1819, John Robinson, Attorney General of Upper Canada, issue a legal opinion that all persons of African descent entering Upper Canada should be guaranteed freedom, even if they had been enslaved in another country. Slavery remained legal, however, until the British Parliament's Slavery Abolition Act 1833 finally abolished slavery in most parts of the British Empire effective 1 August 1834.

==== Nova Scotia ====
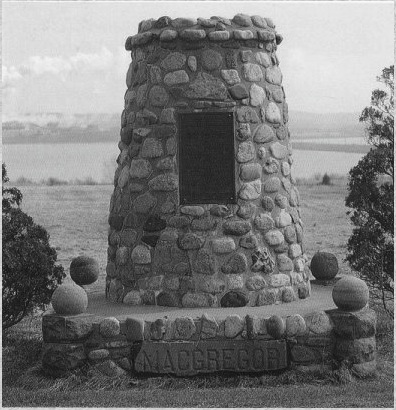
Monument to abolitionist James Drummond MacGregor – helped free Black Nova Scotian slaves

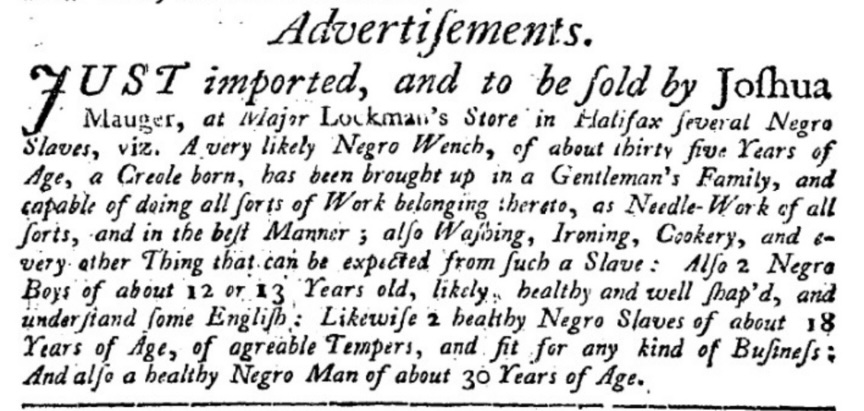
Advertisement. Just imported and to be sold... (Halifax Gazette, 30 May 1752)

While many black people who arrived in Nova Scotia during the American Revolution were free, others were not. Some black slaves arrived in Nova Scotia as the property of white American Loyalists. In 1772, prior to the American Revolution, Britain outlawed the slave trade in the British Isles followed by the Knight v. Wedderburn decision in Scotland in 1778. This decision, in turn, influenced the colony of Nova Scotia. In 1788, abolitionist James Drummond MacGregor from Pictou published the first anti-slavery literature in Canada and began purchasing slaves' freedom and chastising his colleagues in the Presbyterian church who owned slaves. Historian Alan Wilson describes the document as "a landmark on the road to personal freedom in province and country". Historian Robin Winks writes it is "the sharpest attack to come from a Canadian pen even into the 1840s; he had also brought about a public debate which soon reached the courts". (Abolitionist lawyer Benjamin Kent was buried in Halifax in 1788.) In 1790 John Burbidge freed his slaves. Led by Richard John Uniacke, in 1787, 1789 and again on 11 January 1808 the Nova Scotian legislature refused to legalize slavery. Two chief justices, Thomas Andrew Lumisden Strange (1790–1796) and Sampson Salter Blowers (1797–1832), were instrumental in freeing slaves from their owners in Nova Scotia. They were held in high regard in the colony. Justice Alexander Croke (1801–1815) also impounded American slave ships during this time period (the most famous being the Liverpool Packet). During the war, Nova Scotian Sir William Winniett served as a crew on board HMS Tonnant in the effort to free slaves from America. (As the Governor of the Gold Coast, Winniett would later also work to end the slave trade in Western Africa.) By the end of the War of 1812 and the arrival of the Black Refugees, there were few slaves left in Nova Scotia. (The Slave Trade Act 1807 outlawed the slave trade in the British Empire and the Slavery Abolition Act 1833 outlawed slavery altogether.)

The Sierra Leone Company was established to relocate groups of formerly enslaved Africans, nearly 1,200 black Nova Scotians, most of whom had escaped from the United States. Given the coastal environment of Nova Scotia, many had died from the harsh winters. They created a settlement in the existing colony in Sierra Leone (already established to make a home for the "poor blacks" of London) at Freetown in 1792. Many of the "black poor" included other African and Asian inhabitants of London. The Freetown settlement was joined, particularly after 1834, by other groups of freed Africans and became the first African American haven in Africa for formerly enslaved Africans.

==== Underground Railroad ====
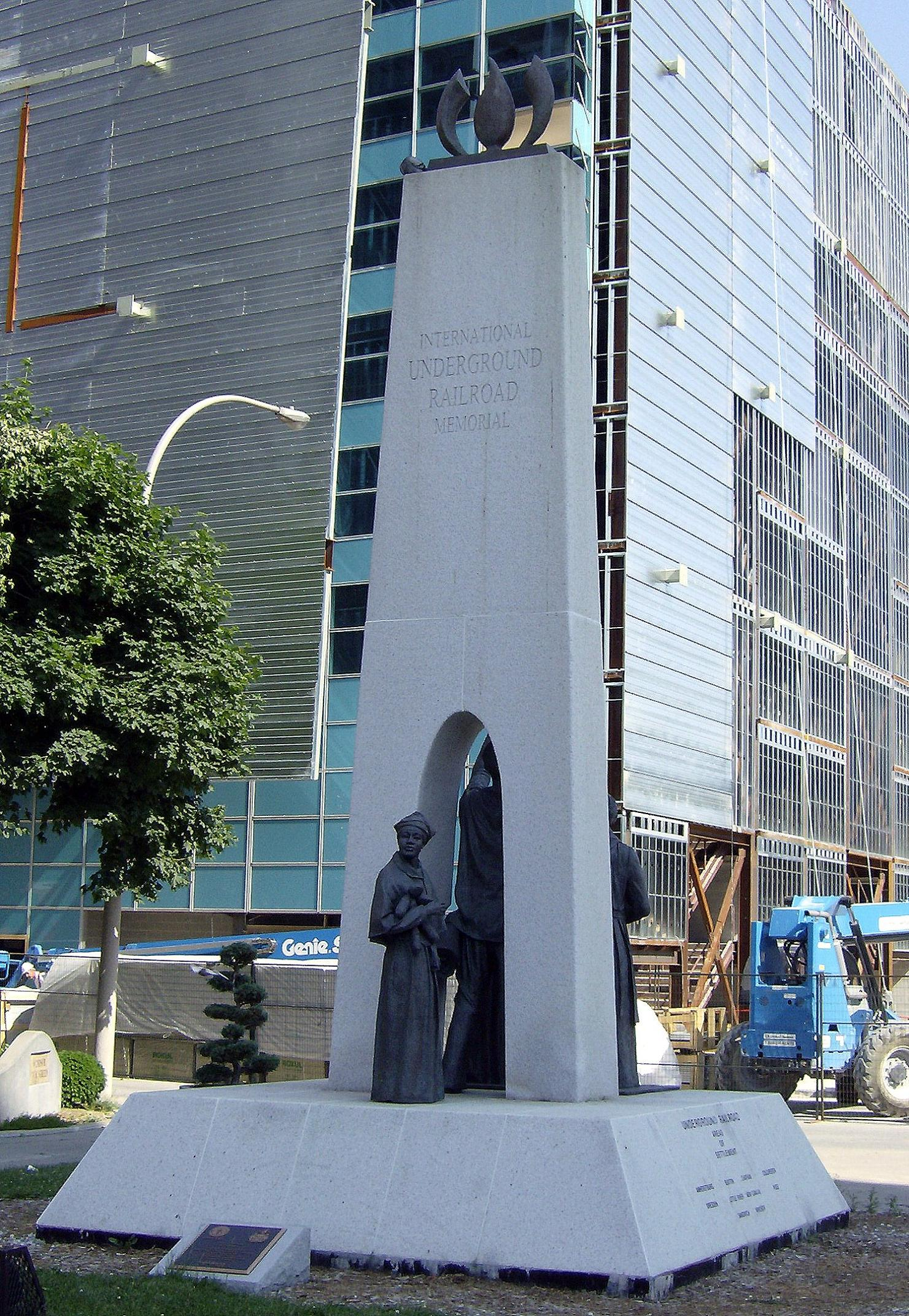
International Underground Railroad Memorial in Windsor, Ontario

During the early to mid-19th century, the Underground Railroad network was established in the United States to free slaves, by bringing them to locations where the slaves would be free from being re-captured. British North America, now known as Canada, was a major destination of the Underground Railroad after 1850, with between 30,000 and 100,000 slaves finding refuge.

In Nova Scotia, former slave Richard Preston established the African Abolition Society in the fight to end slavery in America. Preston was trained as a minister in England and met many of the leading voices in the abolitionist movement that helped to get the Slavery Abolition Act 1833 passed by the British Parliament. When Preston returned to Nova Scotia, he became the president of the Abolitionist movement in Halifax.

Preston stated:

The time will come when slavery will be just one of our many travails. Our children and their children’s children will mature to become indifferent toward climate and indifferent toward race. Then we will desire ... Nay!, we will demand and we will be able to obtain our fair share of wealth, status and prestige, including political power. Our time will have come, and we will be ready ... we must be.

There are slave cemeteries in parts of Canada, in various states of condition, some neglected and abandoned. They include cemeteries in St-Armand, Quebec; Shelburne, Nova Scotia; and Priceville and Dresden in Ontario.

== Forced Labor and Slavery in the 20th Century ==
=== 1914 to 1920: Slavery through Internment ===
From 1914 to 1920 8500 Ukrainian men - along with their wives and children - were interned by the Canadian Government as "enemy aliens", despite having committed no crime to warrant their arrest. Internment of Ukrainian Canadians was used as a means to provide unpaid labour to farms, mines, and road or rail construction. Internees were forced to work against their will, under threats of violence or death.

=== Other instances ===
The ratifying of the Slavery Convention by Canada in 1953 began the country's international commitments to address modern slavery. Human trafficking in Canada is a legal and political issue, and Canadian legislators have been criticized for having failed to deal with the problem in a more systematic way. British Columbia's Office to Combat Trafficking in Persons formed in 2007, making British Columbia the first province of Canada to address human trafficking in a formal manner. The biggest human trafficking case in Canadian history surrounded the dismantling of the Domotor-Kolompar criminal organization. On June 6, 2012, the Government of Canada established the National Action Plan to Combat Human Trafficking in order to oppose human trafficking. The Human Trafficking Task force was established in June 2012 to replace the Interdepartmental Working Group on Trafficking in Persons as the body responsible for the development of public policy related to human trafficking in Canada.

One current and highly publicized instance is the vast disappearances of Aboriginal women which has been linked to human trafficking by some sources. Former Prime Minister Stephen Harper had been reluctant to tackle the issue on the grounds that it is not a "sociological issue" and declined to create a national inquiry into the issue counter to United Nations and Inter-American Commission on Human Rights' opinions that the issue is significant and in need of higher inquiry.

In July 2024, a report for the United Nations Human Rights Council by UN Special Rapporteur on contemporary forms of slavery Tomoya Obokata described the temporary foreign worker program as a "breeding ground for contemporary slavery". Obokata's report found many instances of debt bondage, wage theft, lack of personal protective equipment, abuse, and sexual misconduct. Immigration minister Marc Miller gave a statement to Reuters saying that the program was "in need of reform" and that the low-wage stream needed to be examined.

== See also ==
- Marie-Joseph Angélique
- Marguerite Duplessis
- Sophia Pooley
- History of slavery
- Human rights in Canada
- History of slavery in Louisiana
- Turner Chapel, Oakville's Black church
- R v Jones (New Brunswick)
