= Human trafficking in Canada =

Human trafficking in Canada is prohibited by law, and is considered a criminal offence whether it occurs entirely within Canada or involves the "transporting of persons across Canadian borders. Public Safety Canada (PSC) defines human trafficking as "the recruitment, transportation, harbouring and/or exercising control, direction or influence over the movements of a person in order to exploit that person, typically through sexual exploitation or forced labour. It is often described as a modern form of slavery."

Between 2009 and 2018, police services in Canada have reported 1,708 incidents of human trafficking. In this period, Nova Scotia and Ontario recorded average annual rates higher than the national average. Accounting for 39% of the total Canadian population, Ontario has accounted for 68% of all police-reported human trafficking incidents since 2009; Nova Scotia, on the other hand, accounts for 3% of the overall population and 6% of all human trafficking incidents. According to Statistics Canada, evidence suggests that Nova Scotia, and Halifax in particular, are part of a corridor that is frequently used to "transport victims of human trafficking from Atlantic Canada to larger urban centres elsewhere in Canada."

Human trafficking has become a significant legal and political issue in the country, and Canadian legislators have been criticized for having failed to deal with the problem in a more systematic way. In 2007, the Office to Combat Trafficking in Persons was formed in British Columbia, making it the first province of Canada to address human trafficking in a formal manner. In 2010 came the biggest human trafficking case in Canadian history, which involved the dismantling of the Dömötör-Kolompár criminal organization. On 6 June 2012, the Government of Canada established the National Action Plan to Combat Human Trafficking in order to oppose human trafficking; the Human Trafficking Taskforce was subsequently established to replace the Interdepartmental Working Group on Trafficking in Persons as the body responsible for the development of public policy related to human trafficking in Canada.

In 2019, the Canadian Centre to End Human Trafficking launched the Canadian Human Trafficking Hotline, funded in part by PSC, to provide crisis response to people being trafficked and tip reporting.

The U.S. State Department's Office to Monitor and Combat Trafficking in Persons placed Canada in "Tier 1" in 2017 and 2023.

In 2023, the Organised Crime Index gave the country a score of 4 out of 10 for human trafficking, noting a slight increase in the crime.

== RCMP ==
Regarding human trafficking, the Royal Canadian Mounted Police (RCMP) is tasked with:

- enforcing the law
- seeking out and identifying potential victims via awareness initiatives and investigations
- helping build and foster crime prevention initiatives
- collaborating with other law enforcement and government agencies to share information and coordinate the approach.

In 2005, the RCMP estimated that 600-800 people are trafficked into Canada annually, and that additional 1,500-2,200 are trafficked through Canada into the United States. This was updated in 2010.

In 2011, Corporal Jassy Bindra stated that there were more than 30 ongoing investigations into human trafficking across Canada. Cindy Kovalak is the Human Trafficking Awareness Coordinator for the Northwest Region Immigration and Passport Section of the RCMP.

== Law ==
Both the Criminal Code and the Immigration and Refugee Protection Act (IRPA) have specific sections that address human trafficking.

IRPA brought Canada's first anti-trafficking legislation into force in 2002, prohibiting bringing anyone into Canada by means of abduction, fraud, deception, or use or threat of force or coercion. While Criminal Code incidents may or may not involve the crossing of international borders, IRPA specifically refers to incidents of cross-border human trafficking.

On 29 June 2010, the 40th Canadian Parliament enacted An Act to amend the Criminal Code (minimum sentence for offences involving trafficking of persons under the age of eighteen years). The act established a mandatory sentencing of 5 years' imprisonment for those charged with the trafficking of children within Canada.

On 28 June 2012, An Act to amend the Criminal Code (trafficking in persons) amended the Criminal Code to enable the Government of Canada to prosecute Canadians for trafficking in persons while outside Canada.

=== UN Protocol ===
Until the year 2000, there was no internationally recognized definition of sex trafficking. The United Nations Protocol to Prevent, Suppress and Punish Trafficking in Persons defines human trafficking in the following way:

Trafficking in Persons shall mean the recruitment, transportation, transfer, harbouring, or receipt of persons, by means of use of force or other forms of coercion, of abduction or fraud, of deceptions, of the abuse of power of a position of vulnerability or of the giving or receiving of payment or benefits to achieve the consent of a person having control over other persons, for the purpose of exploitation. Exploitation shall include, at the minimum, the exploitations of the prostitutions of other or other forms of sexual exploitation, forces labor or services, slavery or practices similar to slavery, servitude or the removal of organs.

According to the UN Protocol, sex trafficking does not require cross-border movements of humans. However, many people continue to confuse or use the terms human trafficking and human smuggling interchangeably. Domestic sex trafficking has recently been gaining attention in Canada.

Canada ratified the 2000 UN TIP Protocol in May 2002.

=== Bill C-49 ===
The UN Protocol itself did not give legal effect to the definition, and countries were required to adopt legislative and other measures to establish criminal offences. Following the ratification in Canada of the Protocol, Parliament passed legislation to amend the Criminal Code with Bill C-49.

Bill C-49, An Act to amend the Criminal Code (trafficking in persons), came into force on 25 November 2005, creating three new additional indictable offences specifically to address human trafficking and which can be used by law enforcement to address this crime. The Act amends the Criminal Code to specifically prohibit trafficking in persons in Canada. Previously, the Code contained no provisions to specifically prohibit trafficking in persons, although a number of offences—including kidnapping, uttering threats, and extortion—played a role in targeting this crime.

Bill C-49 added to the Immigration and Refugee Protection Act by going beyond the focus on immigration and making trafficking in persons a criminal offence. The Act contains three prohibitions. The first contains the global prohibition on trafficking in persons, defined as the recruitment, transport, transfer, receipt, concealment or harbouring of a person, or the exercise of control, direction or influence over the movements of a person, for the purpose of exploitation. The second prohibits a person from benefiting economically from trafficking. The third prohibits the withholding or destroying of identity, immigration, or travel documents to facilitate trafficking in persons.

Bill C-49 also ensures that trafficking may form the basis of a warrant to intercept private communications and to take bodily samples for DNA analysis, and permits inclusion of the offender in the sex offender registry. Finally, Bill C-49 expands the ability to seek restitution to "victims" who are subjected to bodily or psychological harm.

== Aboriginal women and girls ==
According to the Native Women's Association of Canada, the overrepresentation of Indigenous women and girls in sexual exploitation and trafficking in Canada has been explored on repeated occasion through a span of years. The impacts of colonialism seemed to have remain as the identified root cause, including "the legacies of the residential schools and their inter-generational effects, family violence, childhood abuse, poverty, homelessness, lack of basic survival necessities, race and gender-based discrimination, lack of education, migration, and substance addictions." Colonization in Canada has taken and maintains the form of systematic discrimination, embodied in harmful policies and legislation that have greatly damaged Aboriginal societies. Research into human trafficking in Canada shows that Aboriginal women and children are the majority of those trafficked domestically.

=== Recruitment ===
Traffickers mask their exploitation behind the appearance of claiming to care about the girl, and the relationship may start out with expensive gifts. Sometimes girls are made to recruit other girls, their motivation is frequently not their own economic profit but fear of violence from their own trafficker if they refuse or fail to bring in someone else. The dancers who end up trafficked are Aboriginal girls who are moved many times across provinces for their job until they have become disconnected from friends and family. Aboriginal girls, particularly in rural communities, are sometimes lured through communications with traffickers in the city who promise them employment (in respectable jobs, not trafficking). Hitchhiking is more of a direct approach, where girls are picked up attempting to relocate or travel, and are pushed into sexual exploitation.

A heavy presence for recruitment is the use of gangs. One of the motivators for a gang presence in the sex trafficking of Aboriginal women and girls may be the perception that trafficking women and girls for sex acts is a low-risk crime for incarceration. Gangs use similar recruitment methods as other more straightforward traffickers. Many identified that drug addiction was a popular tool for gangs, seemingly over that of force, for achieving these women's compliance. "For vulnerable Aboriginal youth, often faced with low self-esteem and a lack of sense of belonging, gangs can offer both of these through enrollment". Sometimes, their recruitment process requires sexual exploitation or that they recruit others. Gang presence is on the rise, and represents a growing, if not completely quantifiable, source for active recruitment of Aboriginal women and girls into sex trafficking. Systemic discrimination in terms of overrepresentation in the criminal justice system and the overrepresentation in the child welfare system factor largely in the vulnerability of these women and girls, which can lead to being trafficked.

The reality for many Aboriginal women and girls in Canada is that they are "victims" and survivors of domestic sex trafficking." Aboriginal women and girls are being targeted for sexual exploitation and relocated from their communities, homes, foster homes, to and within urban centres in Canada. In general, the high rates of migration from a reserve (rural area) to an urban centre also poses an increased risk and entry point through which vulnerable Aboriginal women and girls may be exploited. "The promises by sex traffickers to provide shelter and employment in off reserve communities can lead young Aboriginal girls to feel that they can escape poverty or a potential problem situation at home." They willingly leave their home and community only to discover that the promise was too good to be true and they are forced into sex slavery. They are manipulated and lured by sex traffickers. Many Aboriginal girls go missing from communities or in urban centres and they are viewed as runaways, or simply fall off the radar. The misinterpretations of misconceptions on the definition regarding cross-border movement and coercion leaves many trafficked Aboriginal women and girls unprotected and neglected.

=== Prevention ===
- Awareness-raising through education and discussion
- A safe, non-judgemental place to go
- Cultural connection
- Raising self-esteem
- Service providers who have experience in the trade
- Viable economic alternatives

Education is crucial, both for potential "victims" and those around them, including the community. Education refers to being educated on the difference between healthy relationships and unhealthy ones (specifically, sexually exploitive relationships). Part of education is not taking things for granted. It is not always obvious what is and is not appropriate. One of the ways that exploitation is allowed to continue is due to the lack of education of the realities of the trauma and prevalence of exploitation. Educating is not just for the potentially exploited, exploitation happens in the dark, in unhealthy environments, and for many, before they have a chance to learn and set healthy parameters.

The practice of sexually trafficking women and girls is a practice that discriminates against their gender, under a justification on the part of the trafficker that this behaviour is somehow permissible. Therefore, it comes as no surprise that the promotion of women's equality come into focus. "These should be pursued in laws and policies that focus on reducing harm against women".

More than five hundred First Nations girls and women have gone missing in Canada over the last thirty years. No one knows at this point in time, how many of these disappearances are linked to the flesh market and, perhaps, domestic sex trafficking, but many believe that the two are likely related.

It is evident that "Canada has systematically failed to comply with its international and domestic obligations under the Trafficking Protocol for the protection of "victims" of human trafficking."

=== UN Declaration on the Rights of Indigenous Peoples ===
As a result of historical injustices (colonization, genocide, loss of lands and resources) and discriminatory government legislation and policies, Indigenous peoples have been prevented from fully realizing or exercising all of their human rights. Recognized by Canada in November 2000 as an "aspirational document," the United Nations Declaration on the Rights of Indigenous Peoples (UNDRIP) is a framework that re-affirms the rights of Indigenous peoples, and to strengthen the relationship between States and Indigenous Peoples. This Declaration affirms that "Indigenous individuals have the rights to life, physical and mental integrity and liberty and security" (Article 7). Many Aboriginal women in prostitution do not participate in the sex trade by choice and have been a "victim" of childhood abuse and sex trafficking. Aboriginal women have the right to protection and safety of the law regardless of the views of others that they are choosing prostitution.

Article 8c of the (UNDRIP) asserts that "States shall provide effective mechanisms for prevention of, and redress for any form of forced population transfer which has the aim or effect of violating or undermining any of the rights of Indigenous Peoples." Indigenous women and girls are overrepresented in the sex trade and are at a higher risk of being trafficked for the purposes of sexual exploitation. This is a complete violation of their human rights and States have an obligation to invest effective mechanisms, interventions, programs and services to address this issue. Indigenous women are often recruited into the sex trade when they are still children. Article 17 reaffirms that States shall "in cooperation with Indigenous Peoples take specific measure to protect Indigenous children from economic exploitation and from performing any work that is likely to be hazardous or to interfere with the child’s education, or to be harmful to the child’s health or physical, mental, spiritual, oral or social development."

Trafficking, prostitution, and commercial sexual exploitation of Aboriginal women and girls are all forms of extreme violence against women. They are repeatedly exposed to acts of violence, sexual violence, trauma, and torture. Article 22 of the UNDRIP recognizes the responsibility of States to take measure to "ensure that Indigenous women and children enjoy the full protection and guarantees against all forms of violence and discrimination."

== Other reports ==
According to a 2009 US State Department Human Rights Report:

NGOs estimated that 2,000 persons were trafficked into the country annually, while the RCMP estimated 600 to 800 persons, with an additional 1,500 to 2,200 persons trafficked through the country into the United States. Many victims were Asians and Eastern Europeans, but a significant number also came from Africa, Latin America, and the Caribbean. Women and children were trafficked for sexual exploitation; on a lesser scale, men, women, and children were trafficked for forced labor. Some girls and women, most of whom were Aboriginal, were trafficked internally for commercial sexual exploitation.

However, it did not break these figures down further by type of trafficking, nor comment on their accuracy:

Vancouver, Montreal, and Toronto served as hubs for organized crime groups trafficking in persons, including for prostitution. East Asian crime groups targeted the country, Vancouver in particular, to exploit immigration laws, benefits available to immigrants, and the proximity to the U.S. border.

ACT Alberta partnered with Mount Royal University to produce a report released in 2012 stating that Calgary is a transit point, destination, and source for human trafficking. The report also states that some of the victims are sexually exploited, although no percentage is provided in the report.

=== Trafficking in Persons Reports ===
The Trafficking in Persons Report is an annual report of the U.S. State Department that takes stock of the international human trafficking situation, with Tier 1 being the best while Tier 3, may be subject to certain U.S. government sanctions, such as the withholding of non-humanitarian, non-trade-related foreign assistance, funding for government employees educational and cultural exchange programs.

Canada has been rated as Tier 1 consistently with the exception of 2003, when it was considered Tier 2. The 2009 report states

The Government of Canada fully complies with the minimum standards for the elimination of trafficking. During the past year, the Canadian government maintained strong victim protection and prevention efforts, and demonstrated modest progress in prosecuting and punishing trafficking offenders, securing five trafficking-specific convictions during the past year. Law enforcement personnel, however, reported difficulties with securing adequate punishments against offenders.

The 2010 report confirmed Canada's Tier 1 status, stating that "Prostitution by willing adults is not human trafficking regardless of whether it is legalized,

decriminalized, or criminalized." Therefore, should Canada fully legalize sex work, it will not affect its Tier ranking. This is a change from earlier reports such as 2005, which linked tolerance of prostitution to trafficking. Furthermore, the US now follows the International Labour Organization which considers human trafficking to be predominantly an issue of forced labour rather than of sexual exploitation.

== Sex work and trafficking ==
As noted by the US report, some Canadian NGOs such as Vancouver Rape Relief believe that making prostitution legal is the best way to prevent human trafficking, forced prostitution, child prostitution and similar abusive activities. They argue that a system that allows legalized and regulated prostitution inherently takes business away from traffickers while also allowing sex workers more outlets to leave sex work or report exploitation. However these claims are disputed by other organizations.

Justice Susan Himel, in a 2010 Ontario Superior Court decision, referring to the New Zealand "Report of the Prostitution Law Review Committee on the Operation of the Prostitution Reform Act 2003", noted that "[u]nder-aged prostitution does not appear to have increased post-decriminalization, and, as of 2007, no situations involving trafficking in the sex industry have been identified."
