= An Act to amend the Criminal Code =

An Act to amend the Criminal Code may refer to:

- An Act to amend the Criminal Code (hate propaganda), an Act of the Canadian Parliament passed in April 2004 that prescribes penalties for publicly inciting hatred against people on the basis of sexual orientation - formerly known as Bill C-250
- An Act to amend the Criminal Code (minimum sentence for offences involving trafficking of persons under the age of eighteen years), an Act of the Canadian Parliament passed in June 2010 - formerly known as Bill C-268
- An Act to amend the Criminal Code (trafficking in persons), an Act of the Canadian Parliament passed in June 2012 that enables the Attorney-General to prosecute Canadians for trafficking in persons while outside of Canada - formerly known as Bill C-310
- An Act to amend the Criminal Code (offences relating to conveyances), an Act of the Canadian Parliament passed in 2017 that has increased police powers related to impaired driving - formerly known as Bill C-46
- An Act to amend the Criminal Code, the Youth Criminal Justice Act and other Acts and to make consequential amendments to other Acts, an Act of the Canadian Parliament passed in June 2019 that made a large number of changes to the criminal law statutes - formerly known as Bill C-75
