= Loly Rico =

Canadian refugee activist

- Citizenship: Canada
- Occupation: Refugee activist
- Employer: Faithful Companions of Jesus Refugee Centre
- Organization(s): Canadian Council for Refugees; Ontario Council of Agencies Serving Immigrants
- Spouse: Francisco Rico-Martinez

Loly Rico is the president of the Ontario Council of Agencies Serving Immigrants. She is married to Francisco Rico-Martinez, with whom she co-directs the Toronto-based Faithful Companions of Jesus Refugee Centre. Rico and her family moved to Canada as refugees in 1990 in order to escape political repression in El Salvador. In 2004, the Toronto City Council gave her the Constance E. Hamilton Award on the Status of Women. In 2008, Rico was given the Trevor Bartram Award by the Canadian Centre for Victims of Torture. When Joy Smith released "Connecting the Dots", a proposal for the National Action Plan to Combat Human Trafficking, Rico criticized the proposal for being too focused on those who create the demand for sex trafficking, saying that it therefore did not sufficiently address victim rehabilitation. She recommended, therefore, that the proposal be amended to allow human trafficking victims to become permanent residents of Canada and therefore be better guarded against being trafficked again. Rico became the president of the Canadian Council for Refugees in 2012. In 2013, Rico remarked that, "unfortunately, the government has been closing the door on refugees." Specifically, she criticized Jason Kenney, Minister of Citizenship and Immigration, for having promised that Canada would resettle more refugees from 2011 to 2012 than in previous years, but not following through on this promise; instead, there was a 26% drop in refugee resettlement in Canada during that period, hitting a 30-year low.
