= C-310 =

C-310 may refer to:

- Bill C-310, a private member's bill that was passed on June 28, 2012, to alter the Criminal Code of Canada with respect to human trafficking
- Cessna 310, an American six-seat, low-wing, twin-engined monoplane
- Olympus C-310 Zoom, a self-contained color digital camera system

== See also ==
- C310i
