= The Exodus Road =

Non-profit organization against human trafficking

The Exodus Road (TER) is a non-governmental 501(c)(3) organization that works to combat human trafficking through prevention, intervention, and aftercare programs.

== History ==
=== Founding ===
In 2010, co-founders Matt and Laura Parker moved their family from Colorado to Thailand to direct a children's home, where they were exposed to the issue of human trafficking and began networking with counter-trafficking NGOs and local law enforcement involved in intervention work. After building a relationship with authorities, Matt offered to collect information for the local police, posing as a customer in a brothel, in hopes to assemble enough information to justify police-led raids. Following the success of these undercover operations, the Parkers founded The Exodus Road as a registered nonprofit organization in 2012.

=== Governance ===
The Exodus Road is governed by an International Advisory Board composed of leaders in the anti-human trafficking field from the United States, Southeast Asia, and Latin America. In each country, there is also a board of directors.

As of November 2021, members of the organization's United States Board of Directors include:

- Steve Leigh, Microsoft Director and the organization's board chair
- Nate Griffin, humanitarian photographer and current board treasurer
- Edwin Desamour, Director of the Lighthouse Sports Complex in north Philadelphia
- Craig Morgan, American country music artist and United States Army veteran
- Soula Parassidis, an international opera singer and anti-trafficking advocate of Greek-Canadian descent
- Laura Parker, co-founder and CEO of The Exodus Road
- Sarah B. Ray, founder of Neema Development
- Hollie Smith, advocate
- Alece Ronzino, founder and CEO of Rest Easy Nashville

==== CEO ====
For the first nine years following the organization's inception, Matt Parker was chief executive officer and Laura Parker the chief communications officer and president. In October 2021, The Exodus Road announced that Matt opted to step down from CEO to spend his energy on front-line work, instead working as the chief strategy consultant for the nonprofit's Global Program Department. Their Board of Directors unanimously voted to appoint Laura in his place.

==== Christian faith ====
While Matt and Laura Parker are strongly motivated by their Christian faith and some of their partners are faith-based, TER’s 501(c)(3) registration status is without religious affiliation.

According to their website, 65% of their staff are foreign nationals, including social workers, support staff, and investigators.

== Programs ==
The Exodus Road is currently headquartered in Colorado Springs, Colorado and supports active operatives in Thailand, India, Latin America, The Philippines, and in the United States. As of May 2023, the organization's website states that they have helped free 2,045 people, aided in the arrest of 1,143 traffickers and perpetrators, helped 1,670 people with aftercare, and trained 2,844 people. The organization explained how they arrive at these numbers in an article published on their website.

=== TraffickWatch Academy: United States ===
TraffickWatch Academy is an initiative of The Exodus Road that features a digital training platform designed to equip law enforcement, leaders, and citizens in the fight against human trafficking. In September 2021, The Exodus Road launched TraffickWatch Academy: United States for free, with the goal of educating users on the components of labor trafficking and sex trafficking in the United States. The multimedia modules share survivor stories based on case files from the nonprofit’s operations and provides practical steps for viewers to personally combat trafficking in their communities.

=== TraffickWatch Academy: Brazil ===
In partnership with the government of Amazonas, TER developed a specialized, in-depth version of TraffickWatch Academy to provide thousands of civil police with counter-trafficking training in Brazil.

=== Intervention ===
The Exodus Road's intervention programs have been in operation since 2012 and focus on training local investigators to pose as clients in brothels. These undercover operatives identify victims and build case files that are then delivered to law enforcement. With this information, TER plans raids in partnership with local law enforcement to arrest the alleged traffickers.

==== DELTA Team ====
The Exodus Road primarily supports local law enforcement in evidence gathering for cases of human trafficking. Working with teams of nationals, the organization deploys trained and highly vetted volunteers known as DELTA Team to help with identifying current victims, gathering intelligence, building evidence packages for police, and supporting operations.

The Exodus Road also has a DELTA Silver team, a cyber investigations team made up of volunteer cyber analytics experts. They gather evidence of suspected trafficking to deliver to law enforcement.

=== Aftercare ===
Beyond Rescue, the organization's aftercare program, serves survivors utilizing a trauma-informed approach. In collaboration with TER's NGO partners, they tailor services for those in greatest need in their areas of operation.

==== Freedom Home in Thailand ====
As part of Beyond Rescue, The Exodus Road opened Freedom Home, a safe house and mentorship program that opened in Fall 2021 and in Thailand. Specifically, this safe house functions as immediate shelter for adult female survivors of sex trafficking and sexual exploitation and any of their dependents. Freedom Home provides trauma-informed therapy, life skills classes, counseling, medical care, community internships, and job skills training.

The Exodus Road received a $60,000 grant to support their Freedom Home project in Thailand from the UN Voluntary Trust Fund for Victims of Human Trafficking (UNVTF), managed by the United Nations Office on Drugs and Crime (UNODC). UNODC announced that The Exodus Road's Beyond Rescue project was selected for their fifth call for proposals under sub-grant program two of its small grants program. In total, 10 NGO projects that provide emergency aid to human trafficking survivors were selected for award, totaling approximately USD 0.6 million in grants.

== Partnerships and funding ==
Cellebrite is a significant partner of The Exodus Road, having provided training and strategic resources for their investigative teams. The organization has used Cellebrite UFED devices to legally collect information on open cases. Cellebrite Training also donated training seats for their CCO and CCPA training classes, which TER will use this to train law enforcement partners in digital forensics investigation methods and techniques.

Federal Police in Brazil collaborated with The Exodus Road to launch an anti-human trafficking campaign in December 2022. The goal of the campaign was to educate and inform the public about what human trafficking looks like and how they can assist police in finding survivors and stopping traffickers.

The Exodus Road provides the results of financial audits and Form 990 annually to uphold financial integrity, receiving two third-party endorsements in transparency, including a Guidestar Platinum Seal of Transparency. Their Charity Navigator Encompass Rating includes a 100 out of 100 Finance and Accountability score.

In addition, TER has corporate sponsorships with businesses such as Accelerated Wealth, N2Gives, MDRT Foundation, 5DayDeal, 24HourRace, Curtis Carlson Family Foundation, and Child Aid International. They are also one of the official partners at End It Movement.

== Criticism and accusations ==
In 2017, The Exodus Road received a complaint of a hostile work environment, after an incident of a sexualized nature at a work event. The Exodus Road engaged an outside law firm, Lewis Roca Rothgerber Christie, which conducted investigations. The investigations did reveal inappropriate behavior, including drunkenness and nudity at work-related events, and the organization implemented the recommendations from the law firm, which included termination of certain individuals other disciplinary actions. The summative statement from the investigation has been published publicly by the legal firm.

The Exodus Road has also been criticized for being religiously influenced to use trafficking as a pretext to intervene against sex workers and remove their sources of income. The organization has on several occasions clarified the difference between fighting human trafficking and sex work, stating that they are looking for those who are in sex work due to “force, abduction, fraud, or coercion,” or those who are underage (which legally qualifies them as human trafficking victims). Specifically, TER functions under the United Nations' definition of human trafficking: "recruitment, transportation, transfer, harboring or receipt of people through force, fraud or deception, with the aim of exploiting them for profit."

The organization has also been criticized for their use of military jargon, such as describing volunteers as "covert operatives" to carry out their mission.

Critics of organizations like The Exodus Road allege that such organizations have invited television crews and supporters to watch and film its raids of brothels for the "shock value" and to raise funds. However, according to the organization's brand guidelines on their website, they state that they do not use raid imagery of survivors in their content.

== Book ==
Laura Parker wrote the book, The Exodus Road: One Wife's Journey Into Sex Trafficking and Rescue, published in 2014.
