= United Nations Voluntary Trust Fund for Victims of Trafficking in Persons =

The United Nations Voluntary Trust Fund for Victims of Trafficking in Persons is a United Nations establishment to provide humanitarian, legal and financial aid to victims of human trafficking with the aim of increasing the number of those rescued and supported, and broadening the extent of assistance they receive. It was launched on 4 November 2010 by U.N. Secretary-General Ban Ki-moon,

The Fund was established in accordance with resolution A/RES/64/293 Article 38 of the General Assembly on 12 August 2010 - United Nations Global Plan of Action to Combat Trafficking in Persons. The fund is distributed via calls for proposals of projects meeting the aims of the fund.

To ensure efficient, transparent, and accountable Fund administration and to support uniform and consolidated reporting, the United Nations Office on Drugs and Crime (UNODC) is designated as the Fund Manager for the Fund.

== See also ==
- Global Plan of Action to Combat Trafficking in Persons
- Protocol to Prevent, Suppress and Punish Trafficking in Persons, especially Women and Children
