= Global Plan of Action to Combat Trafficking in Persons =

2010 human trafficking action plan

- Type: Action plan
- Drafted: July 2010

The Global Plan of Action to Combat Trafficking in Persons is a human trafficking action plan adopted by the United Nations in July 2010.

== Description ==
Kyrgyzstan supported the plan's adoption, as did Canada, and Mexico signed off on the plan that September. The plan was first proposed by Belarus. One of the most significant elements of the plan is the United Nations Voluntary Trust Fund for Victims of Trafficking in Persons, which was launched in November 2010 to support human trafficking victims through financial, legal, and humanitarian aid. In October 2012, the Anglican Consultative Council resolved that the ecclesiastical provinces of the Anglican Communion ought to study and raise awareness about the plan.

A meeting of the sixty-seventh session of the United Nations General Assembly at United Nations Headquarters in New York City, New York, United States was convened in May 2013 to assess the progress of the plan's implementation. Francis Chullikatt, Permanent Observer of the Holy See to the United Nations, spoke at this meeting, saying that the meeting allowed the international community opportunity "to renew our commitment to work together and to condemn with one voice the abhorrent and immoral practice of trafficking in human beings." At the time of the meeting, there were 39 member states of the United Nations that had not ratified the plan.

== See also ==
- National Action Plan to Combat Human Trafficking
