= Olympus C-310 Zoom =

Olympus Camedia 310 Zoom (Also known as the Olympus Camedia D-540 Zoom)
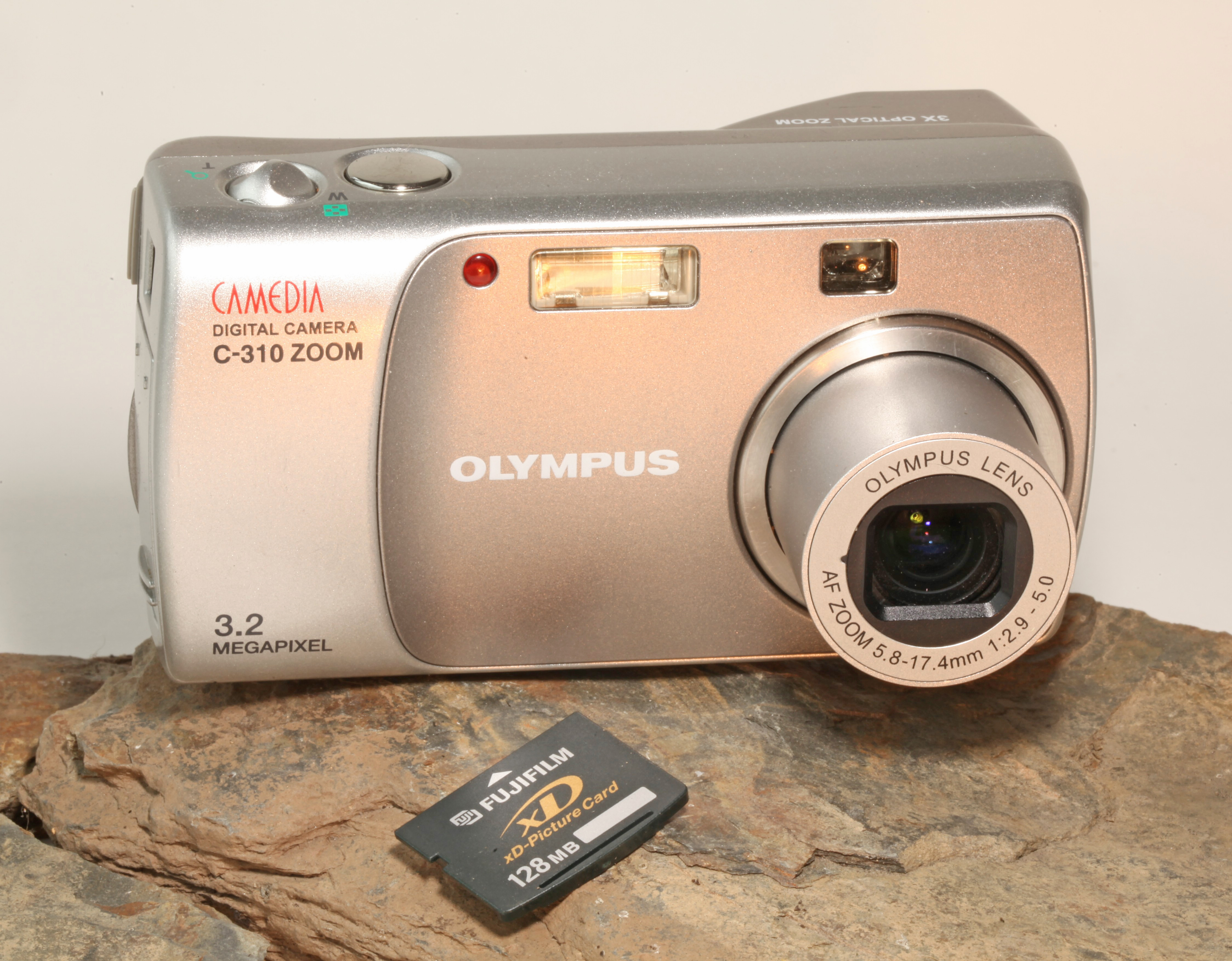

Overview
- Maker: Olympus Optical Co. Ltd.
- Type: Still image camera with motion capability

Lens
- Lens: Permanently attached 3x Zoom Lens
- F-numbers: Min: 2.9; Max: 5.0

Sensor/medium
- Sensor type: Digital CCD
- Sensor size: 3.2 Megapixels
- Recording medium: xD Picture Card, removable

Focusing
- Focus: Automatic, Manual

Shutter
- Shutter speeds: 1/2000 to 2s

The Olympus Camedia 310 Zoom is a self-contained color digital camera system, produced by Olympus Optical Co., Ltd.

== Features ==
The Olympus Camedia C-310 Zoom is positioned towards the bottom of the range in what Olympus calls their “Easy” category. It has a 3.2-megapixel CCD and a 3x optical zoom that is equivalent to a 38–114mm lens on a 35mm format camera. The lens has a respectable aperture range of f2.9 at the widest setting of 35mm and f5.0 at the longest setting of 114mm. The shutter speed range is 2 – 1/2000th second. The C-310 Zoom uses the xD-Picture Card format.

The C-310 Zoom doesn't have conventional exposure modes like aperture-priority, shutter-speed priority or manual. Instead it offers a range of scene modes, starting with Program AE (basically a full-auto mode), then Portrait, Self-portrait, Night Scene, Landscape and Landscape with Portrait. The C-310 Zoom also has a panoramic mode and it allows the recording of short movies (without sound) in the QuickTime Motion JPEG format. There is one movie mode, HQ (320 x 240 pixels), which allows recording up to the capacity of the memory card (48 seconds with a 16 Mb card).

The C-310 Zoom uses the Digital ESP metering system, which takes an average reading from the scene. ISO speeds range from 50 to 320, of which the camera selects the most suitable setting automatically. This setting can’t be manually adjusted. White Balance can be set automatically by the camera, or choice can be made from sunlight, overcast, tungsten light and fluorescent light presets.

The focusing system used is TTL system iESP autofocus with contrast detection. The working range in Standard mode is 0.5m – infinity. There are also two different macro modes available - Macro mode allows to focus as close as 0.2m and Super macro mode as close as 2 cm. The built-in flash has a guide number of 7.6 and offers a range of different modes; Auto (automatic activation in low and backlight), Red-eye Reduction, Fill-in (forced activation) and Off (no flash).

Images are recorded as JPEGs in a range of different quality and size settings:

- 2 048 x 1 536 (3.1 Megapixels)
- 1 600 x 1 200 (1.9 Megapixels)
- 640 x 480 (0.3 Megapixels)

There are no TIFF or RAW formats. To compose your images, you can either use the small optical viewfinder or the 1.8 inch colour TFT LCD monitor with 85,000 pixels. The C-310 Zoom features Olympus' TruePic Turbo technology, which delivers more image clarity, contrast and brilliant colour and also increases the camera's processing speed by up to 30%.

The C-310 Zoom is powered by either a proprietary rechargeable Lithium-ion battery, which takes a couple of hours to fully charge, or 2 x AA Ni-MH/Alkaline rechargeable batteries. The camera features PictBridge compatibility, allowing direct printing with compatible printers. It also incorporates USB 2.0 Full Speed (12 Mbit/s) Auto Connect interface to connect the camera to a computer.

== Package contents ==
From Owner's Manual (May vary from country to country)

- Olympus Camedia 310 Zoom Digital Camera
- Camera Strap
- Warranty Card
- Instruction Manuals
- CAMEDIA Master 4.2 software package CD
- USB Cable
- xD-Picture Card (16 MB, including labels, storage case, and write-protect seals)
- Instruction card
