= An Act to amend the Criminal Code (minimum sentence for offences involving trafficking of persons under the age of eighteen years) =

Enacted Canadian private member's bill

Parliament of Canada
- Long title: An Act to amend the Criminal Code (minimum sentence for offences involving trafficking of persons under the age of eighteen years)
- Citation: SC 2010, c 3
- Territorial extent: Canada
- Enacted by: Parliament of Canada
- Enacted: June 29, 2010

Legislative history
- First reading: January 29, 2009
- Second reading: April 22, 2009
- Third reading: September 30, 2009
- First reading: March 4, 2010
- Second reading: April 21, 2010
- Third reading: June 17, 2010

Summary
- Specifies a mandatory sentencing of five years' imprisonment for those charged with the trafficking of children

Keywords
- Human trafficking
- Status: In force

An Act to amend the Criminal Code (minimum sentence for offences involving trafficking of persons under the age of eighteen years) (French: Loi modifiant le Code criminel (peine minimale pour les infractions de traite de personnes âgées de moins de dixhuit ans)) was a private member's bill that was enacted on June 29, 2010, by the 40th Canadian Parliament. Until that time, no other private member's bill had passed since the 2008 Canadian federal election. The bill that led to the Act, Bill C-268, was sponsored by Joy Smith, Member of Parliament for Kildonan—St. Paul. The act established a mandatory sentencing of five years' imprisonment for those charged with the trafficking of children within Canada.

Before the bill was passed, there was already a maximum sentence for trafficking children in the country, but there was no minimum sentence. A previous attempt to have the bill passed had failed because of prorogation. At the first and second readings, the Bloc Québécois was the only political party that opposed the bill.

Anti-pornography activist Judy Nuttall had tried to get the bill passed before the 2010 Winter Olympics; she said that poor children commonly become sexual slaves at internationally attended events such as the Olympic Games. Assembly of Manitoba Chiefs Grand Chief Ron Evans also supported the bill before it was passed, saying, "Bill C-268 is one step forward for the First Nations women and children of Canada."
