= An Act to amend the Criminal Code (trafficking in persons) =

Canadian Act of Parliament

Parliament of Canada
- Long title: An Act to amend the Criminal Code (trafficking in persons)
- Citation: SC 2012, c 15
- Territorial extent: Canada
- Enacted by: Parliament of Canada
- Royal assent: June 28, 2012

Legislative history
- Bill citation: Bill C-310
- Introduced by: Joy Smith
- First reading: October 3, 2011 (House of Commons)
- Second reading: December 12, 2011 (House of Commons)
- Third reading: April 27, 2012 (House of Commons)
- First reading: May 1, 2012 (Senate)
- Second reading: May 15, 2012 (Senate)
- Third reading: June 22, 2012 (Senate)

Summary
- Enables the Government of Canada to prosecute Canadians for trafficking in persons while outside of Canada

Keywords
- Human trafficking
- Status: In force

An Act to amend the Criminal Code (trafficking in persons) (French: Loi modifiant le Code criminel (traite des personnes), commonly known as Bill C-310) is a statute passed by the Canadian Parliament in 2012. It amended the Criminal Code to enable the Government of Canada to prosecute Canadians for trafficking in persons while outside of Canada.

Joy Smith, Member of Parliament for Kildonan—St. Paul in Manitoba, introduced Bill C-310 as a private member's bill in the fall of 2011. Smith hoped that the bill would help combat human trafficking globally in a way that could not be accomplished by simply addressing issues relating to border control and immigration to Canada. The first reading of the bill took place on October 3 of that year during the 41st Canadian Parliament. Although private member's bills rarely are enacted, Bill C-310 was passed by Parliament and received royal assent on June 28, 2012.

During debates in the House of Commons on the bill, it received broad support across party lines.

On April 27, 2012, the bill was sent to the Senate with unanimous support from MPs. That June, UNICEF Canada submitted a brief to the Canadian Senate Standing Committee on Legal and Constitutional Affairs relating to Bill C-310. On June 22, 2012, the bill passed third reading in the Senate, and then royal assent on June 28, 2012.

A year later, on May 6, 2013, Naomi Krueger of The Salvation Army appeared as a witness at before the Canadian House of Commons Standing Committee on Justice and Human Rights. Krueger was the manager of Deborah's Gate, a safe house for human trafficking victims run by the Salvation Army in Vancouver, British Columbia. She testified to the Committee that Bill C-310 "created opportunities to better support ... the victims whom we serve on a day-to-day basis at Deborah's Gate."
