= An Act to amend the Criminal Code, the Youth Criminal Justice Act and other Acts and to make consequential amendments to other Acts =

2019 act of the Canadian Parliament

Parliament of Canada
- Citation: SC 2019, c. 25
- Passed by: House of Commons
- Passed: 3 December 2018
- Passed by: Senate
- Passed: 13 June 2019
- Royal assent: 21 June 2019
- Commenced: Various dates, on proclamation

Legislative history

Initiating chamber: House of Commons
- Bill title: Bill C-75
- Bill citation: Bill C-75, 42nd Parliament, 1st Session
- Introduced by: Jody Wilson-Raybould, Minister of Justice
- First reading: 29 March 2018
- Second reading: 11 June 2018
- Considered in committee: 2 November 2018
- Third reading: 3 December 2018

Revising chamber: Senate
- First reading: 3 December 2018
- Second reading: 4 April 2019
- Considered in committee: 4 June 2019
- Third reading: 13 June 2019

Summary
- Omnibus criminal law amendments, including abolition of peremptory jury challenges
- Status: In force

An Act to amend the Criminal Code, the Youth Criminal Justice Act and other Acts and to make consequential amendments to other Acts (French: Loi modifiant le Code criminel, la Loi sur le système de justice pénale pour les adolescents et d’autres lois et apportant des modifications corrélatives à certaines lois) is a statute passed by the Parliament of Canada. It formerly was known as Bill C-75. Some (if not all) provisions of the Act came into force on 19 September 2019.

It made the headlines when Justice Andrew Goodman of the Ontario Superior Court at trial ruled that the Act had effectively infringed on an indigenous defendant's Charter Rights under Section 7. The first Trudeau administration had meant the Act to redress the power of defendants to dismiss potential jurors as part of their peremptory challenge rights granted as early as 1215 in the Magna Charta document.

The need to rectify the law had become apparent to Liberal watchers of the death of Colten Boushie as a result of his 9 August 2016 trespass on the farm of Gerald Stanley, when they perceived racism to be evident in Stanley's 9 February 2018 acquittal. The OSC case is known as R v Dale King. A learned commentator wrote, before the 19 September implementation, that the elimination of peremptory challenges "defeats the intended purpose".
