= Interdepartmental Working Group on Trafficking in Persons =

Canadian government organization

- Abbreviation: IWG-TIP
- Successor: Human Trafficking Taskforce
- Formation: 1999
- Dissolved: June 6, 2012; 14 years ago
- Type: GO
- Legal status: Ad hoc
- Purpose: To develop public policy related to human trafficking in Canada
- Region served: Canada

The Interdepartmental Working Group on Trafficking in Persons (IWG-TIP) was the body responsible for the development of public policy related to human trafficking in Canada until the organization was replaced by the Human Trafficking Taskforce in June 2012. The IWG-TIP was established in 1999 and was co-chaired by the Department of Foreign Affairs, Trade and Development and the Department of Justice. Seventeen agencies and departments of the Government of Canada participated in the working group. The group produced a pamphlet in 14 languages with the intention of educating at-risk women about how they might avoid being trafficked. This pamphlet was distributed internationally. The IWG-TIP promoted the idea that victims of human trafficking should be primarily served by community organizations. In 2004, the IWG-TIP was mandated to create a national anti-human-trafficking plan, and both politicians and non-governmental organizations (NGOs) proceeded to remind the IWG-TIP of this unfulfilled mandate for the following eight years. The IWG-TIP continued to promise to establish such a plan throughout these years. On March 31, 2004, the IWG-TIP website was updated to state that it was having a meeting with academics and NGOs "to discuss various elements of a potential federal anti-trafficking strategy," but no more updates were made to the website over the following four years.
