= Dömötör-Kolompár criminal organization =

Criminal organization in Canada

- Founder: Ferenc Dömötör, Gyula Dömötör
- Years active: 2008–2010
- Territory: Hamilton, Ontario, Canada
- Ethnicity: Romani
- Membership: over 25 members
- Activities: fraud; human trafficking; slave labor

The Dömötör-Kolompár criminal organization was a Canadian human trafficking ring that was dismantled. This crime family from Pápa, Hungary moved to Canada en masse and applied for refugee status. The organization was composed of an extended Romani family, and they settled in Hamilton, Ontario. They lured up to 19 people from Pápa to Hamilton starting in 2008 and then used them as unfree labour, forcing them to do construction work without paying them. The Royal Canadian Mounted Police issued approximately 60 charges against members of the organization.

Ferenc Dömötör, the leader of the organization, was arrested on October 9, 2010, and charged with fraud and human trafficking. Nine members pleaded guilty to charges of human trafficking, and 17 members were convicted of related offences. Gyula Dömötör, the man with the second highest position in the organization, received a seven-and-a-half-year prison sentence, the harshest sentence anyone had ever received in Canada for human trafficking at that time, until Ferenc Dömötör later received a 9-year prison sentence. Michael Csoke of the Hamilton Police Fugitive Apprehension Unit, who was part of the initial investigation into the organization's activities, criticized Canada's immigration laws for being so lax as to allow the Dömötörs and the Kolompárs into the country. Twenty members of the family were deported.
