= ACT Alberta =

Canadian organization against human trafficking

- Type: Coalition
- Purpose: To identify, respond to, and raise awareness about human trafficking
- Headquarters: Edmonton, Alberta, Canada
- Region served: Alberta, Canada
- Official language: English
- Website: http://www.actalberta.org/

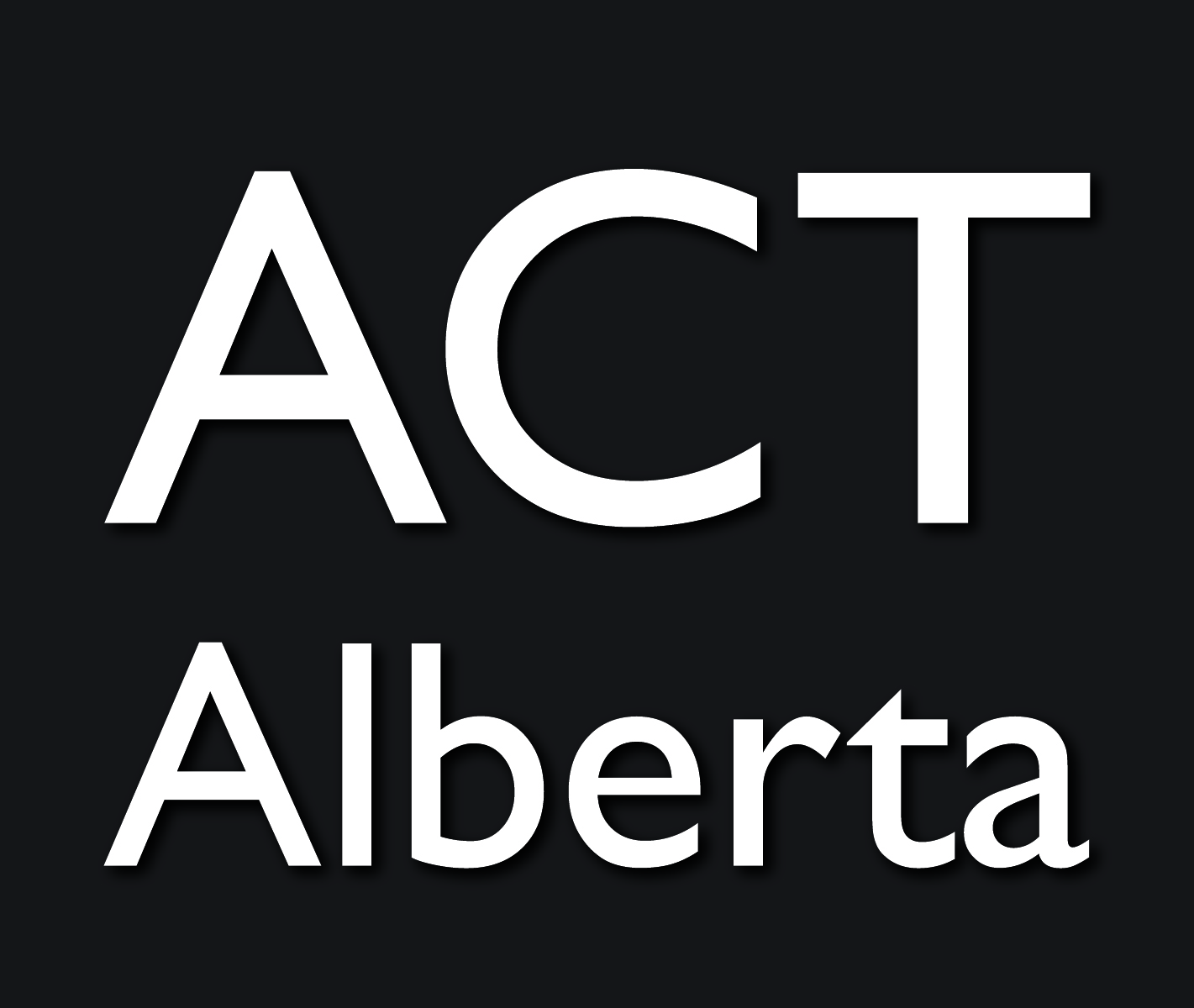
The ACT Alberta logo

ACT Alberta (short for Action Coalition on Human Trafficking Alberta) is a Canadian coalition of Government of Alberta representatives, non-governmental organizations, community organisations, and the Royal Canadian Mounted Police. ACT Alberta provides resources to help front-line workers identify potential trafficking situations and aid victims of human trafficking. The coalition also raises awareness of human trafficking in Alberta.

ACT Alberta relies primarily on funding from the provincial and federal government.

== Actions taken ==
- In 2009, the coalition responded to Edmonton's first alleged human trafficking case by collecting more than 1,000 signatures for a petition to have more of the Edmonton Police Service's resources dedicated to fighting human trafficking.
- ACT voiced its opposition to CFBR-FM's 2011 contest that awarded the winner a Russian bride.
- ACT partnered with Mount Royal University to produce a report released in 2012 stating that Calgary is a transit point, destination, and source for human trafficking. The main findings of the report point to a lack of clarity around what constitutes human trafficking by frontline service providers. The research revealed that there are known and suspected victims of human trafficking in Calgary who are foreign nationals and Canadian citizens trafficked for sexual or labour exploitation.
- The Department of Justice provided ACT with funding to host human-trafficking-awareness-raising events during National Victims of Crime Awareness Week 2012.
- In December 2013, ACT Alberta was awarded $199,760 from the Government of Canada for an Edmonton-based project to create a Community Action Plan to help women and girls who are victims of sexual trafficking, or who are at risk of becoming victims.
