= Office to Combat Trafficking in Persons =

Canadian government agency

Agency overview
- Formed: 2007
- Jurisdiction: British Columbia, Canada

The Office to Combat Trafficking in Persons (OCTIP) is a government agency responsible for coordinating efforts to address human trafficking in British Columbia, Canada. The focus of OCTIP's mandate is human rights, specifically those of the victims of human trafficking. OCTIP formed in 2007, making British Columbia the first province of Canada to address human trafficking in a formal manner. In 2008, the United States Department of State released a report on human trafficking in Canada that was generally critical of the Government of Canada for failing to address the issue, but the report praised the efforts of the Executive Council of British Columbia, specifically citing their creation of OCTIP. In June 2011, OCTIP launched a training program to certify first responders to identify, protect, and assist victims of human trafficking in the province. The program cost $106,000; half of the funding came from OCTIP while the rest was covered by Public Safety Canada and the Department of Justice. The following month, the Executive Council of British Columbia cut the annual budget for OCTIP from $500000 down to $300000, got rid of the executive director position, and reduced the number of full-time staff to two. Robin Pike was the executive director before her position was eliminated. Her last day of work was July 29. Between 2007 and 2011, OCTIP serviced more than 100 human trafficking victims in British Columbia.
