= Canadian Council for Refugees =

Canadian non-governmental organization

- Abbreviation: CCR
- Type: NGO
- Purpose: To influence the Government of Canada's public policy regarding refugee settlement and determination
- Location: Montreal
- Region served: Canada
- President: Dorota Blumczynska (past president: Claire Roque)
- Affiliations: Amnesty International; Canadian Council of Churches
- Website: ccrweb.ca
- Formerly called: Standing Conference of Canadian Organizations Concerned for Refugees

The Canadian Council for Refugees (CCR; formerly known as the Standing Conference of Canadian Organizations Concerned about/for/with Refugees) is a Montreal-based non-governmental organization that critiques the Government of Canada's public policy regarding refugee settlement and determination, and provides consultation to Canadian immigration authorities. According to the CCR, refugee services should focus on mental health.

== History ==
In 1978, known at the time as the Standing Conference of Canadian Organizations Concerned for Refugees, the organization was composed of approximately 100 refugee advocacy groups.

Before the 2001 September 11 attacks in the US, the CCR issued a statement claiming that there was a disproportionate amount of immigration security provisions applied to particular refugee communities, including Kurds, Sri Lankan Tamils, Palestinians, Sikhs, people from Algeria, and people associated with the People's Mujahedin of Iran.

The CCR argued that, starting in January 2003, refugees became far less likely to show up for their asylum hearings, when Canadian officials stopped asking the U.S. Immigration and Naturalization Service to guarantee that these refugees would not be arrested.

Towards the end of 2005, the CCR became part of a coalition with Amnesty International and the Canadian Council of Churches to question the constitutionality of the Canada–United States Safe Third Country Agreement. According to the CCR, the agreement would result in increased illegal immigration and people smuggling.

== Organization ==
=== Membership ===
The structure of the organization is based on membership. An organization must be a Canadian non-profit in order to join, while individuals can join as non-voting Associate Members. With over 200 member organizations, the Council has members in all of Canada's provinces (excluding territories).

=== Consultations ===
The CCR holds biannual consultations, the results of which are published on their website library. Each consultation, taking place over three days, has a specific focus. In the consultation of fall 2016, titled "Welcoming Diversity," the CCR published their support for Bill C-6 (titled an Act to amend the Citizenship Act and make consequential amendments to another Act), which was introduced by the Liberal Party of Canada in the summer of 2017. Bill C-6 made significant amendments to Canada's Citizen Act, and made access to Canadian citizenship easier.

== Relations with Government of Canada ==
=== Safe Third Country Agreement ===
In 2005, the CCR challenged the Canadian government's Safe Third Country Agreement with the United States, which came into effect in 2004. The Agreement stipulates that "refugee claimants are required to request refugee protection in the first safe country they arrive in, unless they qualify for an exception to the Agreement." In the case of Canadian Council for Refugees, et al. v. Her Majesty the Queen, the CCR, along with the Canadian Council of Churches, Amnesty International, three NGOs and a John Doe, collectively took the Canadian government to Federal Court after a Colombian national was denied refugee status in the United States. At risk of refoulement due to his status being rendered illegal in the US, the court applicants claimed that the US was therefore not a "Safe Third Country" and that "[t]he United States' policies and practices do not meet the conditions set down for authorizing Canada to enter into a STCA. The U.S. does not meet the Refugee Convention requirements nor the Convention Against Torture prohibition." Though, the Federal Court would uphold the challenge in 2007, the government appealed the decision in 2008, and so the STCA continues to be enforced.

=== Recommendations to the Canadian Government ===
In 2018, on Canada's Refugee Rights Day (4 April), the CCR published a set of three recommendations to the Canadian government, to:

1. Resettle 20,000 government-assisted refugees annually.
2. Ensure applications of privately-sponsored refugees are processed within 12 months.
3. Reform the refugee determination system so that all claimants have access to a fair hearing before an expert independent tribunal (i.e., the Immigration and Refugee Board of Canada).
