= Kildonan—St. Paul =

Federal electoral district in Manitoba, Canada

Coordinates: 49.972°N 97.066°W

Manitoba electoral district
- Interactive map of riding boundaries from the 2025 federal election

Federal electoral district
- Legislature: House of Commons
MP
Raquel Dancho
Conservative
- District created: 2003
- First contested: 2004
- Last contested: 2025
- District webpage: profile, map

Demographics
- Population (2011): 81,794
- Electors (2015): 61,252
- Area (km²): 172
- Pop. density (per km²): 475.5
- Census division(s): Division No. 11, Division No. 13
- Census subdivision(s): Winnipeg (part), Springfield (part), East St. Paul, West St. Paul

Kildonan—St. Paul is a federal electoral district in the Winnipeg Capital Region of Manitoba, Canada. It has been represented in the House of Commons of Canada since 2004.

== Geography ==
It consists of the far northern end of Winnipeg and the rural municipalities of East St. Paul and West St. Paul.

== Demographics ==
14.4% of the riding's residents are of Polish ethnic origin, the highest such percentage for any Canadian federal riding.

Panethnic groups in Kildonan—St. Paul (2011−2021)
Panethnic group	2021		2016		2011	
Panethnic group	Pop.	%	Pop.	%	Pop.	%
European (Note: Statistic includes all persons that did not make up part of a visible minority or an indigenous identity.)	56,390	62.3%	59,090	71.4%	63,470	78.44%
Southeast Asian (Note: Statistic includes total responses of "Filipino" and "Southeast Asian" under visible minority section on census.)	12,395	13.69%	8,700	10.51%	6,160	7.61%
Indigenous	9,720	10.74%	8,435	10.19%	6,700	8.28%
South Asian	6,300	6.96%	2,605	3.15%	1,675	2.07%
African	2,330	2.57%	1,450	1.75%	1,050	1.3%
Latin American	975	1.08%	660	0.8%	510	0.63%
East Asian (Note: Statistic includes total responses of "Chinese", "Korean", and "Japanese" under visible minority section on census.)	880	0.97%	715	0.86%	800	0.99%
Middle Eastern (Note: Statistic includes total responses of "West Asian" and "Arab" under visible minority section on census.)	425	0.47%	300	0.36%	90	0.11%
Other/multiracial (Note: Statistic includes total responses of "Visible minority, n.i.e." and "Multiple visible minorities" under visible minority section on census.)	1,105	1.22%	815	0.98%	385	0.48%
Total responses	90,510	98.94%	82,760	98.43%	80,920	98.93%
Total population	91,480	100%	84,077	100%	81,794	100%
Notes: Totals greater than 100% due to multiple origin responses. Demographics based on 2012 Canadian federal electoral redistribution riding boundaries.

== History ==
This riding was created in 2003 from Winnipeg North—St. Paul, Winnipeg North Centre and a small part of Winnipeg—Transcona riding.

This riding lost territory to Winnipeg North and Elmwood—Transcona during the 2012 electoral redistribution.

=== Members of Parliament ===
Parliament	Years	Member	Party
Kildonan—St. Paul; Riding created from Winnipeg North—St. Paul, Winnipeg North Centre and Winnipeg—Transcona
38th	2004–2006	Joy Smith	Conservative
39th	2006–2008	Joy Smith	Conservative
40th	2008–2011	Joy Smith	Conservative
41st	2011–2015	Joy Smith	Conservative
42nd	2015–2019	MaryAnn Mihychuk	Liberal
43rd	2019–2021	Raquel Dancho	Conservative
44th	2021–2025	Raquel Dancho	Conservative
45th	2025–present	Raquel Dancho	Conservative

=== Current member of Parliament ===
Its member of Parliament is Raquel Dancho, a member of the Conservative Party of Canada.

== Election results ==
Graph of election results in Kildonan—St. Paul (minor parties that never got 2% of the vote or didn't run consistently are omitted)

2025 Canadian federal election
** Preliminary results — Not yet official **
Party	Candidate	Votes	%	±%	Expenditures
Conservative	Raquel Dancho	26,366	47.49	+5.04	
Liberal	Thomas Naaykens	24,818	44.70	+16.79	
New Democratic	Emily Clark	3,853	6.94	–16.86	
People's	Erik Holmes	486	0.88	–4.54	
Total valid votes/expense limit					
Total rejected ballots					
Turnout		55,523	71.90		
Eligible voters		77,223			
Conservative notional hold		Swing		–5.88	
Source: Elections Canada

2021 federal election redistributed results
Party	Vote	%
Conservative	20,962	42.45
Liberal	13,782	27.91
New Democratic	11,755	23.80
People's	2,677	5.42
Green	152	0.31
Others	58	0.12

2021 Canadian federal election
Party	Candidate	Votes	%	±%	Expenditures
Conservative	Raquel Dancho	18,375	41.8	-3.0	$79,711.15
Liberal	Mary-Jane Bennett	12,934	29.4	+1.5	$30,391.22
New Democratic	Emily Clark	10,313	23.5	+2.3	$5,804.65
People's	Sean Howe	2,325	5.3	+4.1	$2,327.71
Total valid votes/expense limit		43,947	99.2	–	$105,384.72
Total rejected ballots		337	0.8		
Turnout		44,284	66.1		
Eligible voters		66,990			
Conservative hold		Swing		-2.3	
Source: Elections Canada

2019 Canadian federal election
Party	Candidate	Votes	%	±%	Expenditures
Conservative	Raquel Dancho	19,856	44.8	+4.96	$92,599.19
Liberal	MaryAnn Mihychuk	12,356	27.9	-14.76	none listed
New Democratic	Evan Krosney	9,387	21.2	+6.91	none listed
Green	Rylan Reed	1,777	4.0	+2.22	$0.00
People's	Martin Deck	510	1.2	–	none listed
Christian Heritage	Spencer Katerynuk	304	0.7	-0.41	$2,640.00
Independent	Eduard Hiebert	108	0.2	-0.12	$741.74
Total valid votes/expense limit		44,298	100.0		
Total rejected ballots		222			
Turnout		44,520	67.7		
Eligible voters		65,719			
Conservative gain from Liberal		Swing		+9.99	
Source: Elections Canada

2015 Canadian federal election
Party	Candidate	Votes	%	±%	Expenditures
Liberal	MaryAnn Mihychuk	18,717	42.66	+34.78	$57,688.21
Conservative	Jim Bell	17,478	39.84	-18.63	$76,554.16
New Democratic	Suzanne Hrynyk	6,270	14.29	-15.76	$43,914.70
Green	Steven Stairs	783	1.78	-0.86	–
Christian Heritage	David Reimer	485	1.11	–	$7,381.13
Independent	Eduard Walter Hiebert	142	0.32	–	–
Total valid votes/expense limit		43,875	100.00		$196,949.80
Total rejected ballots		161	0.37	–	
Turnout		44,036	71.48	–	
Eligible voters		61,604			
Liberal gain from Conservative		Swing		+26.70	
Source: Elections Canada

2011 federal election redistributed results
Party	Vote	%
Conservative	21,417	58.47
New Democratic	11,007	30.05
Liberal	2,888	7.88
Green	970	2.65
Other	348	0.95

2011 Canadian federal election
Party	Candidate	Votes	%	±%	Expenditures
Conservative	Joy Smith	22,670	58.16	+4.76	–
New Democratic	Rachelle Devine	11,727	30.08	-2.62	–
Liberal	Victor Andres	3,199	8.21	+0.07	–
Green	Alon Weinberg	1,020	2.62	-1.98	–
Independent	Brett Ryall	218	0.56	–	–
Independent	Eduard Hiebert	145	0.37	-0.21	–
Total valid votes/expense limit		38,979	100.00		–
Total rejected ballots		154	0.93	+0.03	
Turnout		39,133	62.05	+4	
Eligible voters		63,066	–	–	

2008 Canadian federal election
Party	Candidate	Votes	%	±%	Expenditures
Conservative	Joy Smith	19,751	53.40	+10.27	$64,584
New Democratic	Ross Eadie	12,093	32.70	+12.53	$25,719
Liberal	Lesley Hughes*	3,009	8.14	-25.33	–
Green	Kevan Bowkett	1,685	4.60	+1.89	$101
Christian Heritage	Jordan Loewen	233	0.63	–	$1,302
Independent	Eduard Hiebert	214	0.58	+0.06	$3,872
Total valid votes/expense limit		36,985	100.00		$78,899
Total rejected ballots		156	0.42	+0.08	
Turnout		37,141	58	-6	
Conservative hold		Swing		-1.13	

* Lesley Hughes was nominated as the Liberal candidate but subsequently lost the nomination. Since she lost it after the candidate nomination deadline, she was still listed on the ballot as a Liberal

2006 Canadian federal election
Party	Candidate	Votes	%	±%	Expenditures
Conservative	Joy Smith	17,524	43.13	+5.83	$58,321
Liberal	Terry Duguid	13,597	33.47	-3.06	$70,764
New Democratic	Evelyn Myskiw	8,193	20.17	-2.35	$16,314
Green	Colleen Zobel	1,101	2.71	+0.64	$0.00
Independent	Eduard Hiebert	213	0.52	–	$3,521
Total valid votes		40,628	100.00		–
Total rejected ballots		137	0.34	+0.02	
Turnout		40,765	66	+6	

2004 Canadian federal election
Party	Candidate	Votes	%	Expenditures
Conservative	Joy Smith	13,582	37.30	$53,156
Liberal	Terry Duguid	13,304	36.54	$64,174
New Democratic	Lorene Mahoney	8,202	22.53	$32,688
Green	Jacob Giesbrecht	756	2.08	$1,929
Marijuana	Rebecca Whittaker	290	0.80	not listed
Christian Heritage	Katharine Reimer	278	0.76	$1,475
Total valid votes/expenditure limit		36,412	100.00	71,091
Total rejected ballots		117		
Turnout		36,529	60.19	
Electors on the lists		60,689		
Percentage change figures are factored for redistribution. Conservative Party percentages are contrasted with the combined Canadian Alliance and Progressive Conservative percentages from 2000. Sources: Official Results, Elections Canada and Financial Returns, Elections Canada.

== See also ==
- List of Canadian electoral districts
- Historical federal electoral districts of Canada
