= Joy Smith =

Canadian politician

Joy Ann Smith
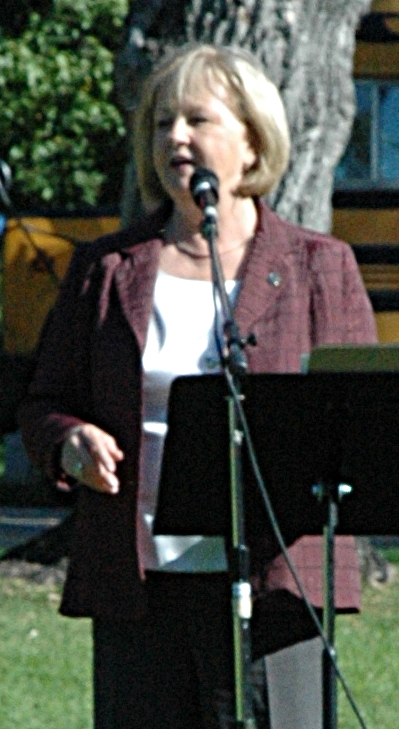
- Joy Smith, September 23, 2009

Member of Parliament for Kildonan—St. Paul
- In office June 28, 2004 – August 4, 2015
- Preceded by: First Member
- Succeeded by: MaryAnn Mihychuk

Member of the Legislative Assembly of Manitoba for Fort Garry
- In office September 21, 1999 – June 3, 2003
- Preceded by: Rosemary Vodrey
- Succeeded by: Kerri Irvin-Ross

Chair of the Standing Committee on Health
- In office November 15, 2007 – November 17, 2013
- Minister: Tony Clement; Leona Aglukkaq; Rona Ambrose
- Preceded by: Rob Merrifield
- Succeeded by: Ben Lobb

Personal details
- Born: February 20, 1947 (age 79) Deloraine, Manitoba, Canada
- Party: Canadian Alliance (2001–2003); Conservative (2003–present)
- Spouse: Bart Smith
- Profession: Music teacher

Joy Ann Smith (born February 20, 1947) is a Canadian politician. She served in the Legislative Assembly of Manitoba between 1999 and 2003, and was in the House of Commons of Canada from 2004 to 2015.

== Education and business career ==
Smith was born in Deloraine, Manitoba, Canada. She holds a Master's Degree in Education from the University of Manitoba (majoring in Math and Science), and a music diploma from the Royal Conservatory of Music in Toronto, Ontario. She worked as a teacher for twenty-three years before entering political life, and in 1986 received the Hedley Award for Excellence in Research. During the 1990s, she served as a liaison for private and home-schooling groups.

Smith is also an entrepreneur. She published a book entitled Lies My Kid's Teacher Told Me in 1996, and a follow-up entitled, Tools of the Trade a few years later. She was also the owner of Gem Records for a time. In 1996, she was nominated for Manitoba's Woman Entrepreneur of the Year award.

== Career in provincial politics ==
Smith was elected to the Legislative Assembly of Manitoba in the 1999 provincial election, as a Progressive Conservative (PC) candidate in the south-central Winnipeg constituency of Fort Garry. She was nominated after the incumbent member of the assembly, cabinet minister Rosemary Vodrey, chose not to run again. In one of the closest constituency races of the campaign, Smith narrowly defeated New Democrat Lawrie Cherniack by thirty votes. The New Democratic Party replaced the Conservatives' majority government with one of their own at the election, and Smith served as the Progressive Conservative critic for education and justice.

In 2002, as justice critic for the Manitoba Progressive Conservatives, she spoke against a bill which provided adoption rights to same-sex couples in that province. Smith argued that her party did not oppose same-sex adoption rights as such, but that the proposed legislation was flawed.

Fort Garry was a top NDP target in the 2003 election, and Smith lost the constituency to New Democrat Kerri Irvin-Ross by eighty-seven votes.

== Career in federal politics ==
In a June 2005 parliamentary debate on same-sex marriage, she stated that, "If (her daughter) decides to get married, she will know that the meaning of marriage is the union of a man and a woman. If she chooses otherwise, it will be her choice." The result of the bill, she said, would be to "cause marriage to just go away with the stroke of a pen." She also claimed the bill was discriminatory against married couples. The Toronto Star reported that Smith broke down in tears during the debate.

She was also a member of the Status of Women Group, Ukrainian-Canadian Parliamentary Group, Canada-Israel Parliamentary Group and Canada-USA Relations Parliamentary Group. In 2004, Smith was selected to be part of the Canadian delegation assigned to travel to Ukraine and observe a court-ordered repeat of the second round of voting the presidential election.

In the 2004 federal election, Smith campaigned as a Conservative candidate in the north Winnipeg riding of Kildonan—St. Paul. She had previously been nominated as a candidate of the Canadian Alliance, where she was the Manitoba organizer for Stockwell Day's bid for leadership, before that party merged with the Progressive Conservatives in 2003–04. Smith narrowly defeated Liberal candidate Terry Duguid, 13,582 votes to 13,304. Smith was named Manitoba caucus chair, giving her a seat on the Conservative Party's Planning and Priorities Committee.

Smith defeated Duguid again by a significantly larger plurality in the 2006 federal election, as the Conservatives won a national minority government, replacing the Liberals as such. Smith along with the Conservative government were re-elected in the October 2008 federal election to another minority government. In 2006, Smith introduced a private member's bill, asking parliamentarians to condemn human trafficking and come up with a comprehensive plan to combat the problem.

In February 2007, Smith put forward motion C-153 to put a national action plan in place to combat human trafficking, and the House of Commons passed the motion unanimously. Smith began developing the plan in 2008 and continued to work on it for several years. She sought to have the plan developed and established in order "to rescue and restore the victims and prosecute the offenders" of human trafficking. The plan was established by the Government of Canada on June 6, 2012 as the National Action Plan to Combat Human Trafficking.

Also in 2007, Smith introduced a private member's bill called the Clean Internet Act (Bill C-427). The bill was passed unanimously, and set in place a strategy to combat human trafficking globally by opposing such trafficking across international borders, specifically in the case of women and children being trafficked for sexual purposes. In her words, the bill would "... prevent the use of the Internet to distribute child pornography, material that advocates, promotes or incites racial hatred, and material that portrays or promotes violence against women." Part of the bill proposes a "know your subscriber" requirement for ISPs and would mandate them to deny Internet access to offenders. It also proposes to give special searching powers to the Ministry of Industry. The above features have led it to be criticized as something that "... would not look out-of-place in countries that aggressively censor the Internet."

In her column, "Sex traders, keep your hands off our children!" (The Province, July 29), Smith asserted that "the average age of entry into prostitution in Canada is between 12 and 14 years of age." In October 2010, Smith conducted the inaugural Honouring Heroes Award Ceremony at Eastview Community Church, an annual event recognizing people who have fought to support victims of sexual trafficking.

In 2012, Smith presented human-trafficking-related Bill C-10 to the Senate of Canada. The bill was eventually passed as the Safe Streets and Communities Act, a policy of the Canadian government. While Smith was in Ottawa to present Bill C-10, she was also scheduled to speak on the talkback panel in conjunction with the human-trafficking-related play She Has a Name.

Smith proposed and claimed to be working on, in July 2013, a bill that disallows access to pornography online for all Canadians by default unless they choose to opt in, similar to earlier legislation put forward in the U.K. by British Prime Minister David Cameron. Details of what content specifically would be deemed "pornographic" and blocked were not provided.

She did not run for re-election in 2015.

== Out of politics ==
In 2012, while in political office, Joy founded The Joy Smith Foundation Inc., a registered charity that works to suppress human trafficking in Canada. After retiring from politics, Joy began working full-time for her organization.

== Electoral record ==
2008 Canadian federal election
Party	Candidate	Votes	%	±%	Expenditures
Conservative	Joy Smith	19,751	53.40%	+10.27%	$64,584
New Democratic	Ross Eadie	12,093	32.70%	+12.53%	$25,719
Liberal	Lesley Hughes	3,009	8.14%	-25.33%	
Green	Kevan Bowkett	1,685	4.60%	+1.89%	$101
Christian Heritage	Jordan Loewen	233	0.63%	–	$1,302
Independent	Eduard Hiebert	214	0.58%	+0.06%	$3,872
Total valid votes/Expense limit		36,985	100.00%	$78,899	
Total rejected ballots		156			
Turnout		37,141			

2006 Canadian federal election
Party	Candidate	Votes	%	±%	Expenditures
Conservative	Joy Smith	17,524	43.13%	+5.83%	$58,321
Liberal	Terry Duguid	13,597	33.47%	-3.06%	$70,764
New Democratic	Evelyn Myskiw	8,193	20.17%	-2.35%	$16,314
Green	Colleen Zobel	1,101	2.71%	+0.64%	$0.00
Independent	Eduard Hiebert	213	0.52%	–	$3,521
Total valid votes		40,628	100.00%		
Total rejected ballots		137			
Turnout		40,765			

2004 Canadian federal election: Kildonan—St. Paul
Party	Candidate	Votes	%	Expenditures
Conservative	Joy Smith	13,582	37.30	$53,156
Liberal	Terry Duguid	13,304	36.54	$64,174
New Democratic	Lorene Mahoney	8,202	22.53	$32,688
Green	Jacob Giesbrecht	756	2.08	$1,929
Marijuana	Rebecca Whittaker	290	0.80	not listed
Christian Heritage	Katharine Reimer	278	0.76	$1,475
Total valid votes/expenditure limit		36,412	100.00	71,091
Total rejected ballots		117		
Turnout		36,529	60.19	
Electors on the lists		60,689		
Percentage change figures are factored for redistribution. Conservative Party percentages are contrasted with the combined Canadian Alliance and Progressive Conservative percentages from 2000. Sources: Official Results, Elections Canada and Financial Returns, Elections Canada.

2003 Manitoba general election: Fort Garry
Party	Candidate	Votes	%	±%	Expenditures
New Democratic	Kerri Irvin-Ross	3,852	46.75	3.13	$21,049.74
Progressive Conservative	Joy Smith	3,765	45.69	1.78	$29,935.35
Liberal	Taran Malik	562	6.82	-4.50	$13,984.00
Independent	Didz Zuzens	61	0.74	–	$395.34
Total valid votes		8,240	–	–	
Rejected		55	–		
Eligible voters / turnout		13,066	63.49	-11.60	
Source(s) Source: Manitoba. Chief Electoral Officer (2003). Statement of Votes for the 38th Provincial General Election, June 3, 2003 (PDF) (Report). Winnipeg: Elections Manitoba.

1999 Manitoba general election: Fort Garry
Party	Candidate	Votes	%	±%	Expenditures
Progressive Conservative	Joy Smith	4,436	43.92	-4.37	$28,543.84
New Democratic	Lawrie Cherniack	4,406	43.62	28.57	$29,325.00
Liberal	Ted Gilson	1,143	11.32	-24.61	$9,808.98
Manitoba	Denise Van Rooyen	116	1.15	–	$1,032.59
Total valid votes		10,101	–	–	
Rejected		37	–		
Eligible voters / turnout		13,502	75.09	3.93	
Source(s) Source: Manitoba. Chief Electoral Officer (1999). Statement of Votes for the 37th Provincial General Election, September 21, 1999 (PDF) (Report). Winnipeg: Elections Manitoba.
