= Disappearance of Jessie Foster =

Nevada disappearance case

Jessie Foster
- Born: Jessica Edith Louise Foster; May 27, 1984; Canada
- Disappeared: April 2006 (aged 21); Las Vegas, Nevada
- Status: Missing for 20 years, 4 months and 13 days
- Occupation: possible forced prostitute
- Years active: 2005–2006
- Parents: Dwight Foster (father); Glendene Grant (mother)

Jessica Edith Louise Foster (born May 27, 1984), is a Canadian woman who disappeared in the Las Vegas Valley in Nevada, United States, in 2006. Her parents are Glendene Grant and Dwight Foster. Jessie Foster had spent some time living in Calgary, Alberta. In 2005, Foster and a friend of hers visited Florida together, and then stopped by Las Vegas on the way back in May where Foster decided to stay. Before disappearing the following year, Foster became involved in prostitution, was arrested once for solicitation, and was the victim of battery on several occasions.

== Investigation ==
Foster was one of four sex workers who disappeared in Las Vegas between 2003 and 2006. The bodies of the other three have been found. The Las Vegas Metropolitan Police Department launched an investigation of a person in question, bringing in a forensic scientist to spray luminol onto surfaces at crime scenes to detect invisible blood stains; but found nothing at his property, nor has he been interrogated on her disappearance. Benjamin Perrin of Vancouver, British Columbia, received a George Ryga Award for Social Awareness in Literature nomination for having written Invisible Chains, a book that prominently deals with human trafficking, and includes the disappearance of Jessie Foster. The documentary, Trafficked No More, features her story and led to some tips to her whereabouts.

On July 26, 2015, the Calgary Sun reported police are investigating Neal Falls, a man killed on July 18, 2015, in Charleston, West Virginia, who may be responsible for the four Las Vegas killings, including Foster.

In 2026, a spokesperson for North Las Vegas police wrote that "there have been no new developments or changes in the status of the Jessica Foster missing persons case," with Foster's mother saying that "until maybe five or seven years ago, [I] considered my own self the lead detective on the case because they [law enforcement] didn’t respond to people who called in tips. They didn’t respond to me asking questions and wanting to talk to them about the case."

== Aftermath ==
Her mother, Glendene Grant (born 1957), founded Mothers Against Trafficking in Humans following her daughter's disappearance. She hosted an internet radio show on BlogTalkRadio through Dreamcatchers for Abused Children, and has hosted such guests as Member of Parliament Joy Smith and Bobby Brown of Dog the Bounty Hunter fame. She lives in Kamloops, British Columbia, Canada. She had a common-law marriage with Dwight Foster, but they later separated. The last time that Grant saw her daughter was Christmas 2005. Grant Foster believes that their daughter became an unwilling victim of human trafficking, and that she thereby became a sexual slave. Grant therefore created almost a dozen websites advertising the disappearance of her daughter. In an effort to find her daughter, Grant has gotten in touch with the Federal Bureau of Investigation, bounty hunters, prostitutes, police officers, psychics, and private investigators. On the 15th anniversary of the disappearance of Jessie Foster, Grant sat down with AU4H Radio - Real Talk hosts Donna Kshir, Lee Roberts and Laurie Ann Smith to discuss in depth Jessie's disappearance and why she believes her daughter was sold into sex trafficking. Grant told the Real Talk hosts that the investigation into Jessie's disappearance could have been handled much differently and 'she feels like the lead detective in Jessie's case.' Grant believes if proper measures had been taken by the northern Las Vegas Police Department following Jessie's disappearance there may have been a different outcome and her daughter may be home by now.

== See also ==
- List of people who disappeared mysteriously: post-1970
- Prostitution in Nevada
- Human trafficking in Nevada § Sex trafficking in Nevada
