= Roderick Haig-Brown Regional Prize =

Annual literary award for residents of British Columbia and the Yukon

The Roderick Haig-Brown Prize is part of the BC and Yukon Book Prizes, awarded in celebration of the achievements of British Columbia writers and publishers. It is awarded to the author(s) of books who "contributes most to the enjoyment and understanding of British Columbia". Unlike the other BC and Yukon Book Prizes, there are no requirements in terms of publication or author residence.

== Winners and nominees ==
Winners and nominees
Year	Winner	Nominees
1985	Hilary Stewart, Cedar	Barry Gough, Gunboat Frontier; Saeko Usukawa, Sound Heritage
1986	Donald Graham, Keepers of the Light	Douglas Cole, Captured Heritage: The Scramble for Northwest Coast Artifacts; Peter Murray, The Devil and Mr. Duncan
1987	Ruth Kirk, Wisdom of the Elders	Philip Croft, Nature Diary of a Quiet Pedestrian; Alan Twigg, Vancouver and Its Winters; Lynne Bowen
1988	W.A. Hagelund, Whalers No More	Jo-Ann Canning-Dew, Hastings & Main; Lynne Bowen, Three Dollar Dreams
1989	Celia Haig-Brown, Resistance and Renewal	Howard White, The Accidental Airline; Bridget Moran, Stoney Creek Woman
1990	Western Canada Wilderness Committee, Carmanah	Earl K. Pollon, Shirlee Smith Matheson, This Was Our Valley; Harry Robinson, Wendy Wickwire, Write It On Your Heart
1991	Paul Tennant, Aboriginal People and Politics	Cyril E. Leonoff, An Enterprising Life; Michael Kluckner, Vanishing Vancouver
1992	Herb Hammond, Seeing the Forest Among the Trees	Michael Poole, Ragged Islands; Jean Barman, The West beyond the West: A History of British Columbia
1993	Harry Robinson, Wendy Wickwire, Nature Power: In the Spirit of an Okanagan Storyteller	Bruce MacDonald, Vancouver: A Visual History; Vickie Jensen, Where the People Gather: Carving A Totem Pole
1994	Alex Rose (editor), Nisga'a Tribal Council, illustrated by Gary Flegehen, Nisga'a: People of the Nass River	Graham Osborne, British Columbia: A Wild and Fragile Beauty; Alan Haig-Brown, Fishing for a Living
1995	Howard White, Raincoast Chronicles: Eleven Up	Tzeporah Berman et al., illustrated by Marguerite Gibbons, Clayoquot & Dissent; Beth Hill, Seven-Knot Summers
1996	Ken Drushka, HR: A Biography Of H.R. MacMillan	Tom Henry, Dogless in Metchosin; Patrick Reid, Wild Colonial Boy: A Memoir
1997	1997 Alan Haig-Brown, Rick Blacklaws, The Fraser River	Richard Cannings, Sydney Cannings, British Columbia: A Natural History; Don Gayton, Landscapes of the Interior
1998	Richard Bocking, Mighty River: A Portrait of the Fraser	Michael Kluckner, The Pullet Surprise: A Year on an Urban Farm; Daniel Wood, Beverly Sinclair, Western Journeys
1999	Mark Hume, Harvey Thommassen, River of the Angry Moon: Seasons on the Bella Coola	Helene Cyr, Handmade Forests: The Treeplanter's Experience; Sean Rossiter, Hotel Georgia
2000	Margaret Horsfield, Cougar Annie's Garden	Faith Moosang, First Son: Portraits by C.D. Hoy; Dick Hammond, Haunted Waters: Tales of the Old Coast; Derek Hayes, Historical Atlas of British Columbia and the Pacific Northwest
2001	Daniel Francis, The Encyclopedia of British Columbia	Richard Somerset Mackie, Island Timber; Terry Glavin, The Last Great Sea; Philip Resnick, The Politics of Resentment; Harold Rhenisch, Tom Thomson's Shack; Gary Wyatt, Mythic Beings: Spirit Art of the Northwest Coast
2002	Keith Thor Carlson, Colin Duffield, Albert (Sonny) McHalsie, Jan Perrier, Leeanna Lynn Rhodes, David M. Schaepe and David Smith, A Stó:lo–Coast Salish Historical Atlas	Wayne Campbell, et al., Birds of British Columbia (Volume 4, Passerines); John Armstrong, Guilty of Everything; Terry Reksten, Illustrated History of BC; Maria Coffey, Dag Goering, Visions of the Wild
2003	Earnest Perrault, Tong: The Story of Tong Louie, Vancouver's Quiet Titan	Ian Thom, E.J. Hughes; Randy Bouchard, Dorothy Kennedy, Indian Myths and Legends from the North Pacific Coast of America; Alison Watt, The Last Island: A Naturalist’s Sojourn on Triangle Island; Francis Mansbridge, Launching History: The Saga of Burrard Dry Dock
2004	Donald Luxton, Building the West: The Early Architects of British Columbia	Ross Freake and Don Plant, Firestorm: The Summer BC Burned; Rob Butler, The Jade Coast: Ecology of the North Pacific Ocean; David Nunuk, Natural Light: Visions of British Columbia; R. Samuel Bawlf, The Secret Voyage of Sir Francis Drake, 1577-1580
2005	Stephen Hume, Alexandra Morton, Betty C. Keller, Rosella M. Leslie, Otto Langer and Don Staniford, A Stain Upon the Sea: West Coast Salmon Farming	Robert Hunter and Robert Keziere, The Greenpeace to Amchitka: An Environmental Odyssey; Daniel Francis, L.D.: Mayor Louis Taylor and the Rise of Vancouver; Nancy Turner, Plants of Haida Gwaii; Jay Sherwood, Surveying Northern British Columbia: A Photo Journal of Frank Swannell
2006	John Vaillant, The Golden Spruce: A True Story of Myth, Madness, and Greed	Lance Berelowitz, Dream City: Vancouver and the Global Imagination; Sheila Harrington, Judith Stevenson, and Kathy Dunster, Islands in the Salish Sea: A Community Atlas; Daryl Ashby, John Muir: West Coast Pioneer; Jean Barman, Stanley Park’s Secret: The Forgotten Families of Whoi Whoi, Kanaka Ranch, and Brockton Point
2007	Katherine Gordon, Made to Measure: A History of Land Surveying in British Columbia	Judith Williams, Clam Gardens: Aboriginal Mariculture on Canada’s West Coast; Ian M. Thom, Charles C. Hill, and Johanne Lamoureux, Emily Carr; Jan Hare and Jean Barman, Good Intentions Gone Awry: Emma Crosby and the Methodist Mission on the Northwest Coast; Rachel Lebowitz, Hannus
2008	J.B. MacKinnon, Alisa Smith, The 100-Mile Diet: A Year of Local Eating	Barry Gough, Fortune's River: The Collision of Empires in the Pacific Northwest; Ian McAllister, The Last Wild Wolves: Ghosts of the Great Bear Rainforest; Tim Bowling, The Lost Coast: Salmon, Memory, and the Death of Wild Culture; Chris Harris, Spirit In the Grass: The Cariboo Chilcotin’s Forgotten Landscape
2009	Stephen Hume, Simon Fraser: In Search of Modern British Columbia	Brad Cran, Gillian Jerome, Hope in Shadows: Stories and Photographs of Vancouver’s Downtown Eastside; Donald A. Pettit, The Peace: A History in Photographs; Daphne Bramham, The Secret Lives of Saints: Child Brides and Lost Boys in a Polygamous Mormon Sect; Margaret Horsfield, Voices from the Sound: Chronicles of Clayoquot Sound and Tofino 1899–1929
2010	Andrew Scott, Encyclopedia of Raincoast Place Names: A Complete Reference to Coastal British Columbia	Ian Gill, All That We Say Is Ours: Guujaaw and the Reawakening of the Haida Nation; Lorne Dufour, Jacob's Prayer; Larry Campbell, Lori Culbert, Neil Boyd, A Thousand Dreams: Vancouver’s Downtown Eastside and the Fight for Its Future; Brian Brett, Trauma Farm: A Rebel History of Rural Life
2011	Dan Savard, Images from the Likeness House	Grant Lawrence, Adventures in Solitude: What Not to Wear to a Nude Potluck and Other Stories from Desolation Sound; Aaron Glass, Aldona Jonaitis, The Totem Pole: An Intercultural History; Bruce Grenville, Scott Steedman (editors), Visions of BC: A Landscape Manual; Sylvia Olsen, Working with Wool: A Coast Salish Legacy and the Cowichan Sweater
2012	Chuck Davis, The Chuck Davis History of Metropolitan Vancouver	Andrew Nikiforuk, Empire of the Beetle: How Human Folly and a Tiny Bug Are Killing North America’s Great Forests; Fred Herzog, Fred Herzog: Photographs; Sheryl Salloum, foreword by Sherrill Grace, The Life and Art of Mildred Valley Thornton [#4 in the Unheralded Artists of BC Series]; Scott Watson, Edited by Naomi Sawada & Jana Tyner, Thrown: British Columbia’s Apprentices of Bernard Leach and Their Contemporaries
2013	Derek Hayes, British Columbia: A New Historical Atlas	Aaron Chapman, Liquor, Lust, and the Law: The Story of Vancouver's Legendary Penthouse Nightclub; Jackson Davies and Marc Strange, Bruno and the Beach: The Beachcombers at 40; Ali Kazimi, Undesirables: White Canada and the Komagata Maru - An Illustrated History; Leslie A. Robertson and Kwagu'l Gixsam Clan, Standing Up with Ga'axsta'las: Jane Constance Cook and the Politics of Memory, Church, and Custom
2014	David Stouck, Arthur Erickson: An Architect's Life	Sean Kheraj, Inventing Stanley Park: An Environmental History; Rolf Knight, Voyage Through the Past Century; Graeme Truelove, Svend Robinson: A Life in Politics; Robin K. Wright, Daina Augaitis (eds), with Haida Advisors Robert Davidson and James Hart, Charles Edenshaw
2015	Richard Beamish and Gordon McFarlane (eds), The Sea Among Us: The Amazing Strait of Georgia	Christine Lowther, Born Out of This; Ian McAllister, Great Bear Wild: Dispatches from a Northern Rainforest; Jay Sherwood, Surveying Southern British Columbia: A Photojournal of Frank Swannell, 1901-07; Margaret Horsfield and Ian Kennedy, Tofino and Clayoquot Sound: A History
2016	Briony Penn, The Real Thing: The Natural History of Ian McTaggart Cowan	Jon Bartlett and Rika Ruebsaat, Soviet Princeton: Slim Evans and the 1932-33 Miners' Strike; Gwen Curry, Tod Inlet: A Healing Place; Derrick Stacey Denholm, Ground-Truthing: Reimagining the Indigenous Rainforests of BC's North Coast; John Thistle, Resettling the Range: Animals, Ecologies, and Human Communities in British Columbia
2017	Neil J. Sterritt, Mapping My Way Home: A Gitxsan History	Anthony Kenyon, The Recorded History of the Liard Basin 1790-1910: Where British Columbia joins the Yukon and N.W.T.; Michael Layland, A Perfect Eden: Encounters by Early Explorers of Vancouver Island; David Pitt-Brooke, Crossing Home Ground: A Grassland Odyssey through Southern Interior British Columbia; Christopher Pollon with photographs by Ben Nelms, The Peace in Peril: The Real Cost of the Site C Dam
2018	Kotaro Hayashi, Fumio “Frank” Kanno, Henry Tanaka, and Jim Tanaka (editors), Changing Tides: Vanishing Voices of Nikkei Fishermen and Their Families	Sarah de Leeuw, Where It Hurts; Marianne Ignace and Ronald E. Ignace, Secwépemc People, Land, and Laws: Yerí7 re Stsq’ey’s-kucw; Travis Lupick, Fighting for Space: How a Group of Drug Users Transformed One City’s Struggle with Addiction; K. Jane Watt, Surrey: A City of Stories
2019	Sarah Cox, Breaching the Peace: The Site C Dam and a Valley's Stand Against Big Hydro	Council of the Haida Nation, Athlii Gwaii: Upholding Haida Law at Lyell Island; Darrin Martens, Beau Dick; Harley Rustad, Big Lonely Doug: The Story of One of Canada’s Last Great Trees; Bill Gaston, Just Let Me Look at You
2020	Michael Nicoll Yahgulanaas, Carpe Fin: A Haida Manga	Michael Christie, Greenwood; Ian McAllister and Alex Von Tol, The Great Bear Rainforest: A Giant-Screen Adventure in the Land of the Spirit Bear; Briony Penn, A Year on the Wild Side: A West Coast Naturalist’s Almanac; Wendy Wickwire, At the Bridge: James Teit and An Anthropology of Belonging
2021	Kwanlin Dün First Nation, Kwanlin Dün: Dǎ Kwǎndur Ghày Ghàkwadîndur—Our Story in Our Words	Grant Buday, Orphans of Empire; Claudia Cornwall, British Columbia in Flames; David McIlwraith (Editor), Wanda Joy Hoe (Translator), The Diary of Dukesang Wong: A Voice from Gold Mountain; Briony Penn with Cecil Paul, Following the Good River: The Life and Times of Wa'xaid
2022	Luschiim Arvid Charlie and Nancy J. Turner, Plants: Traditional Indigenous Foods, Materials and Medicine	Jordan Abel, NISHGA; Karen Duffek, Bill McLennan and Jordan Wilson, Where the Power Is: Indigenous Perspectives on Northwest Coast Art; Barry Gough, Possessing Meares Island: A Historian’s Journey into the Past of Clayoquot Sound; Rahela Nayebzadah, Monster Child
2023	Cole Pauls, Kwändǖr	Dempsey Bob and Sarah Milroy, Dempsey Bob: In His Own Voice; Erika Dyck and Jesse Donaldson, The Acid Room: The Psychedelic Trials and Tribulations of Hollywood Hospital; Caitlin Gordon-Walker, Pam Brown, Jisgang Nika Collison, Anthony Alan Shelton and Jodi Simkin, Knowledge Within: Treasures of the Northwest Coast; Roy Henry Vickers, Ben the Sea Lion
2024	Ian Kennedy, The Best Loved Boat: The Princess Maquinna	Jennifer Bonnell, Stewards of Splendour: A History of Wildlife and People in British Columbia; Wayne McCrory, The Wild Horses of the Chilcotin: Their History and Future; David Norwell, A Complex Coast: A Kayak Journey from Vancouver Island to Alaska; Katherine Palmer Gordon, This Place Is Who We Are: Stories of Indigenous Leadership, Resilience, and Connection to Homelands
2025	Terri-Lynn Williams-Davidson and Robert Davidson, A Haida Wedding	Shashi Bhat, Death by a Thousand Cuts; Laurel Dykstra, Wildlife Congregations: A Priest’s Year of Gaggles, Colonies and Murders by the Salish Sea; Murray Sinclair and Sara Sinclair, Who We Are: Four Questions for a Life and a Nation; Tanya Talaga, The Knowing
2026	Paul Wong and Tamio Wakayama, Enemy Alien: Tamio Wakayama	Eric M. Adams and Jordan Stanger-Ross, Challenging Exile: Japanese Canadians and the Wartime Constitution; Ruby Smith Díaz, Searching for Serafim: The Life and Legacy of Serafim “Joe” Fortes; Larry Grant with Scott Steedman, Reconciling: A Lifelong Struggle to Belong; Robert J. Muckle, Once Upon This Land: Archaeology in British Columbia and the Stories It Tells
