= The Little Book of Cannabis =

2018 nonfiction book

The Little Book of Cannabis: How Marijuana Can Improve Your Life
- Author: Amanda Siebert
- Subject: Cannabis
- Genre: Non-fiction
- Publisher: Greystone Books
- Publication date: October 17, 2018
- Publication place: Canada
- Pages: 231
- OCLC: 1078909398
- Website: littlebookofcannabis.com

The Little Book of Cannabis: How Marijuana Can Improve Your Life is a 2018 nonfiction book about cannabis by Canadian journalist Amanda Siebert, published by Greystone Books. It was the bestselling nonfiction book about cannabis in Canada as of early 2019. A Winnipeg Free Press review stated that the book "avoid[s] being preachy" and "compassionately guides readers through ten areas where cannabis could have therapeutic benefits".

Siebert's November 20, 2018 pro-legalization of cannabis op-ed in The New York Times and her authorship of The Little Book of Cannabis were noted by Nonprofit Quarterly.

== See also ==
- List of books about cannabis
