= Free public transit in Massachusetts =

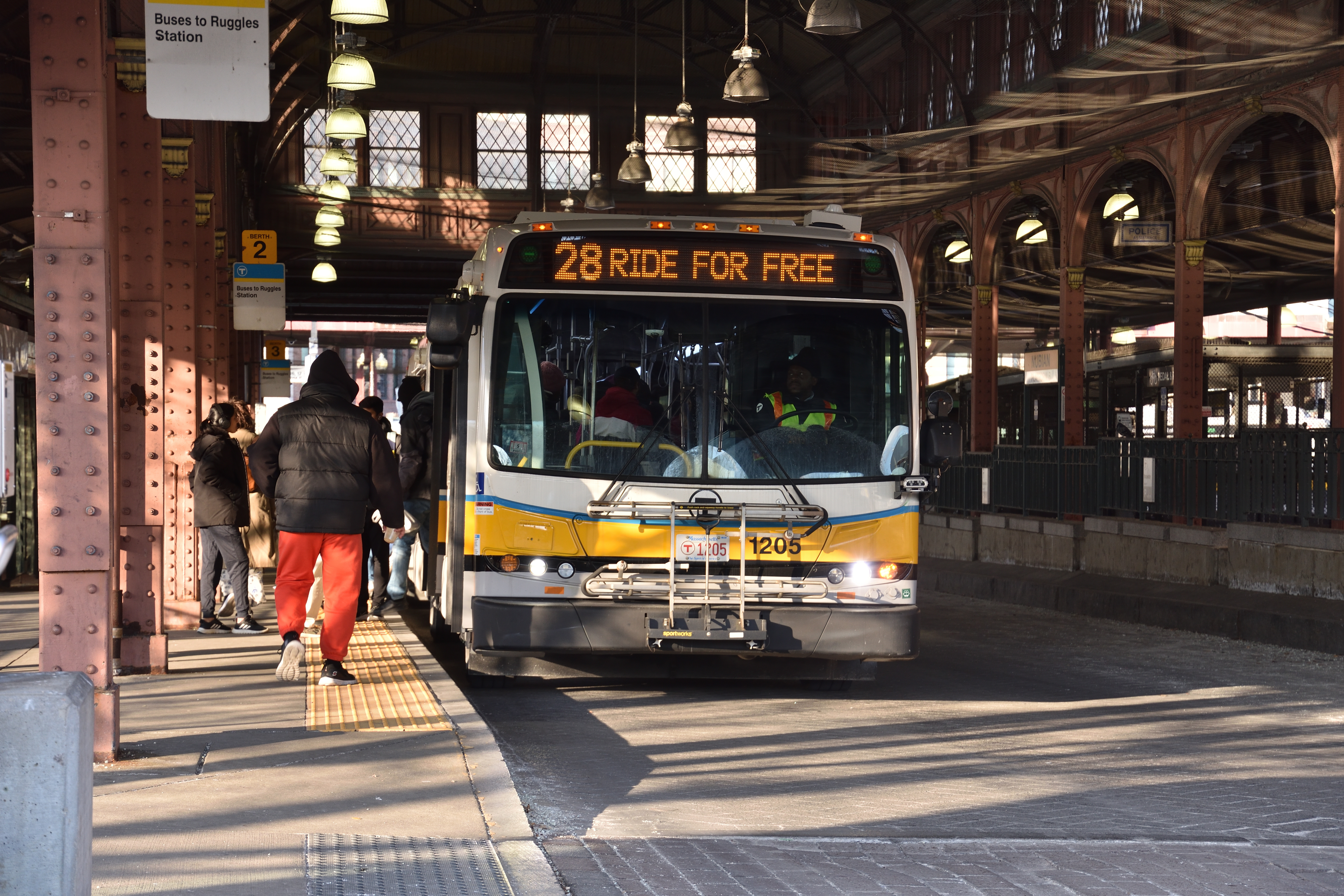
Boston's fare-free MBTA bus route pilot program began solely with the MBTA Route 28 bus (pictured)

Free public transit systems have been implemented in Commonwealth of Massachusetts through various trials and programs since the 2010s. Pilot programs were run on several transit agencies in the state, with many of these pilot programs arising following losses of ridership during the COVID-19 pandemic.

In 2019, the city of Lawrence eliminated fares on several Merrimack Valley Regional Transit Authority (MeVa) bus routes serving it. In 2022, MeVa expanded to systemwide fare-free service. Since 2021, Boston has run a pilot program eliminating fares on high-traffic MBTA bus routes, starting with one line in 2021 and expanding to three in 2022. In the state's 2025 fiscal year budget, funding was piloted for fare-free transit to be allocated to regional transit authorities operating outside of the MBTA's coverage area. In 2026 this was upgraded from a pilot program to a permanent budget item.

Forms of fare-free public transport have received political support from prominent Massachusetts politicians such as Governor Maura Healey, U.S. Senator Ed Markey, U.S. Congresswoman Ayanna Pressley, Boston Mayor Michelle Wu, former Boston acting mayor Kim Janey, and Attorney General Andrea Campbell.

== Boston ==
=== Early advocacy ===
Matthew Haugen of Nonprofit Quarterly credits grassroots support for the idea of free public transit in Boston in the 2010s as coming from groups such as Alternatives for Community and Environment, particularly that group's transit-oriented development director, Mela Bush-Miles.

In a January 31, 2019 op-ed published in The Boston Globe, City Councilor Michelle Wu argued that the Massachusetts Bay Transportation Authority (MBTA) should explore the possibility of eliminating fares. Wu would come to be considered a prominent voice in both the local and national push for fare-free public transit. Later in 2019, she and City Councilor Kim Janey proposed making the MBTA Route 28 bus fare-free. Wu's August 2020 proposal for a Boston Green New Deal incorporated a call for Boston to pursue fare-free public transportation. Crediting Councilwoman Wu as a leader on free public transit, in January 2021, the editorial board of The Boston Globe endorsed the idea of making Boston's buses fare-free.

=== Limited free transit pass pilot program (2021) ===
In March 2021, Kim Janey, at the time the city of Boston's acting mayor, announced a pilot program that would offer 1,000 workers in five of the city's business districts (East Boston, and Fields Corner, Jamaica Plain, Mission Hill, Nubian Square, Three Squares) free MBTA and Bluebikes passes with up to $60 in credit.

=== Fare-free MBTA bus route pilot program (2021–present) ===
In June 2021, Acting Boston Mayor Janey announced that the city would be funding a $500,000 three-month pilot that would see the MBTA's Route 28 bus be made fare-free. In 2019, as a city councilor, she and fellow councilor Michelle Wu had previously called for this bus route to be made fare-free.

The city, in November 2021, announced that its data showed that during the pilot program ridership had increased to an excess of 70,000 in weekly ridership. Pre-COVID-19 pandemic weekly ridership on the route had been 47,000, making the COVID-era pilot program ridership significantly greater despite the general impact of the COVID-19 pandemic on public transportation ridership. The city concluded that, in comparison to ridership trends on comparable routes of the MBTA, the increase in ridership was directly attributable to the pilot program. A later more in-depth 2022 analysis found an overall 38% increase in weekday ridership from 7,500 before the pandemic to 10,200 during the September and October periods during the pilot program.

During the 2021 Boston mayoral election, in which Kim Janey and Michelle Wu were candidates, fellow candidate Andrea Campbell voiced her support for making all of the city's buses fare-free. Candidate John Barros supported making ridership free for some low-income riders on select bus lines. Candidate Annissa Essaibi George was critical of the idea of free public transport, questioning its feasibility.

In December 2021, Michelle Wu, who had won the 2021 mayoral election and was now mayor of Boston, extended the pilot program by two months. Wu afterwards succeeded in launching a two-year program to have the MBTA Route 23, 28, and 29 buses run fare-free for two years, with this program beginning on March 1, 2022. These buses serve the Dorchester, Mattapan, and Roxbury communities. Wu's mayoral campaign had included advocacy for fare-free public transit with the catchphrase "Free the T" ("the T" being a nickname for the MBTA). She filed paperwork for this expansion of the pilot program on her first day as mayor. In mid-November 2021, Wu had sent an appropriations order to the Boston City Council requesting their approval to appropriate $8 million of federal funds to fund the two years of fare-free service on the three bus routes. The funds are COVID-19 pandemic relief funds. At the start of December, the City Council approved the appropriations order 12–1. On February 9, 2022, it was announced by Wu and MBTA General Manager Steve Poftak that the two-year program for the three routes to be fare-free was officially agreed to and would be launched on March 1, 2022.

In February 2022, a report was released by MBTA that showed that in the initial pilot, Route 23 saw a 20% increase in ridership. However, the report showed that due to the limited scope of the pilot, impacting only one line, 66% of riders on the route did not save money on fares as they were required to purchase transit passes for connecting trips. The report also claimed that the fare-free service decreased travel time on the route, with there being a 20% reduction in lag time at stops due to the elimination of fare collection. The initial pilot program had seen the line reach 90% of the pre-pandemic ridership numbers.

Reports show that between February 2021 and February 2023, average weekday ridership on the three lines included in the pilot program had doubled:

- Route 23 increased from 4,783 average weekday ridership to 10,185
- Route 28 increased from 5,571 average weekday ridership to 10,905
- Route 29 increased from 735 average weekday ridership to 1,652

Reports also showed that average weekday ridership had also increased on all three lines by February 2023 compared to pre-COVID-19 pandemic ridership numbers. This came in contrast a 21% overall decrease in average weekday ridership on the whole MBTA bus system compared to pre-pandemic ridership (February 2023 vs. February 2020).

- Route 23 had 10,185 average weekday riders in February 2023 compared to 8,845 in February 2020
- Route 28 had 10,905 average weekday riders in February 2023 compared to 9,128 in February 2020
- Route 29 had 1,652 average weekday riders in February 2023 compared to 1,591 in February 2020

According to a rider survey released in March 2023, 26% percent of passengers on the three fare-free routes saved in excess of $20 per month due to the elimination of fares on those routes. The survey also revealed that 15% of rides on the three bus lines are trips that otherwise would not have been taken using any mode (public or private) in the absence of the fare-free public transit options. At the end of the two-year pilot, the city reported that riders had saved more than $6 million on fares in its two-year run, with half of the riders having savings which averaged $35 per month.

Boston, by late-2022, was looking at further expansion of the program. By April 2023, there were discussions between Boston, Cambridge, and MBTA about additionally making MBTA Route 1 fare-free. In February 2024, the city authorized a $8.4 million two-year extension of the three-route pilot into 2026. In February 2026, Mayor Wu announced that the city would extend the pilot through June 2026. In June 2026, the pilot program was further extended through the end of the year.

=== Two-month fare-free service on the MBTA Blue Line (July and August 2023) ===
During the temporary closure of Boston's Sumner Tunnel (scheduled to last July 5 through August 31, 2023), the MBTA Blue Line rapid transit line ran fare-free.

=== Other MBTA fare-free service ===
On New Year's Eve in December 2022, the MBTA offered fare-free late-night service on all of its services.

== State-funding for fare free bus service by non-MBTA regional transit authorities ==
Beginning November 15, 2022, a 37-day pilot $2.5 million program was launched in which the State of Massachusetts provided several regional transportation authorities in different parts of state with funding for 37 days of fare elimination. The program did not include the MBTA. A spokesperson for Maura Healey, who took office as governor in January 2023, declared that Healey would be "reviewing the results of the Try Transit Holiday initiative, as well as other fare-free programs across the state." Before taking office, Healey had pledged to create "a pathway to fare free buses" in Massachusetts.

In the state's 2025 fiscal year budget, $30 million was included to fund a "Fare-Free Pilot". The program was funded in part from the Fair Share Amendment, a "millionaire's tax". The pilot program's inclusion in the budget received support from Governor Healey, Lieutenant Governor Kim Driscoll, State House Speaker Ron Mariano, State Senate President Karen E. Spilka, and Senate Chair of the Joint Committee on Transportation Brendan Crighton. With the pilot program's funding, MassDot (under Governor Healey's administration) awarded grants to thirteen transit agencies to fund fare free bus service in their systems.

The state's 2026 fiscal year budget upgraded fare-free transit grants to the fifteen regional transit authorities (RTAs) operating bus services outside of the MBTA's service area to a permanent budget item (meaning it is anticipated to be included in future budgets). The grants for fare-free bus service are funded using money generated by the Fair Share Amendment, with $35 million in grants being included in the 2026 budget.

== Merrimack Valley Regional Transit Authority (2019–present) ==
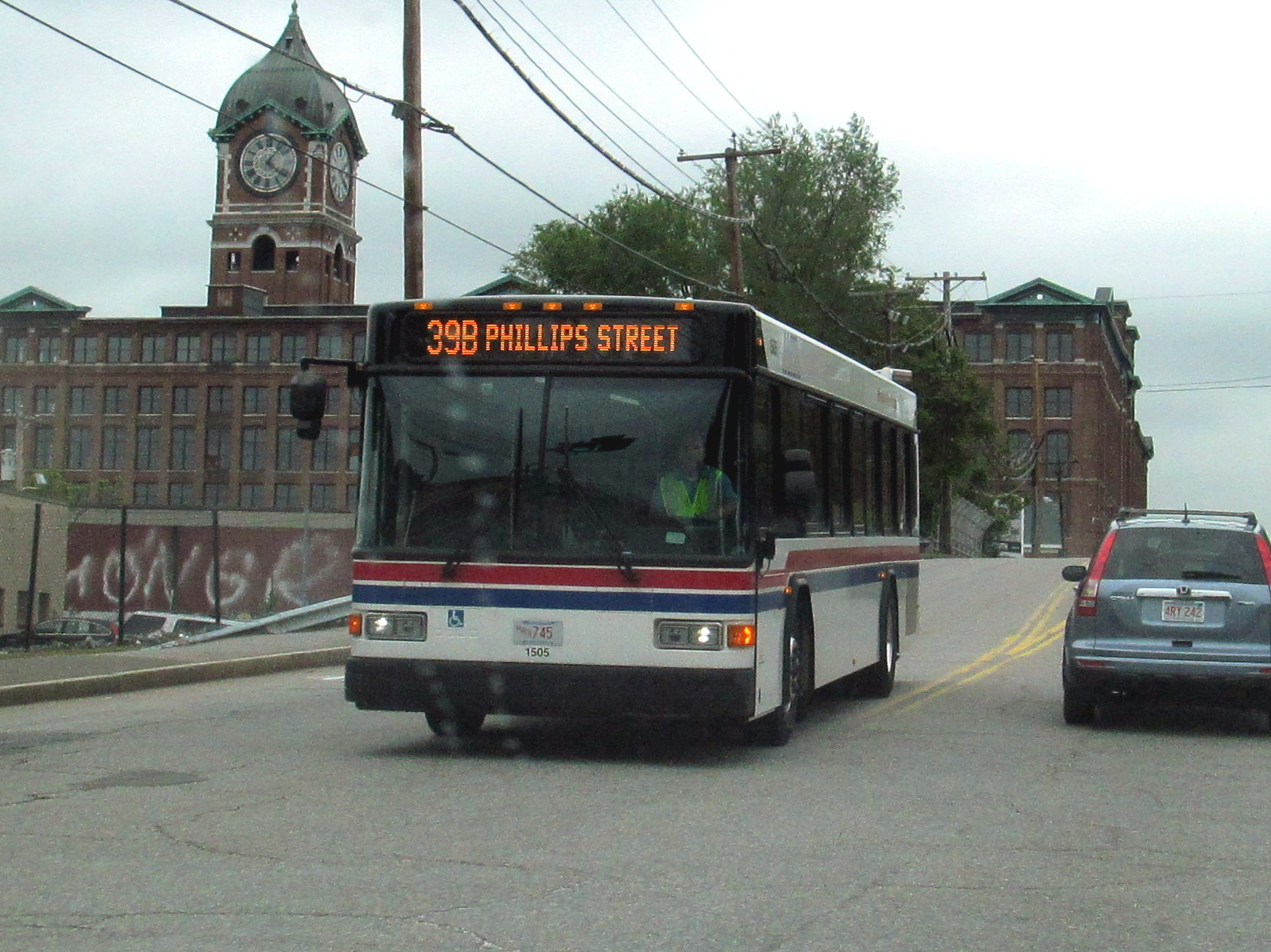
A MeVa bus.

=== 2019 elimination of fares on three routes in Lawrence ===
In 2019, fares were eliminated on three Merrimack Valley Transit (MeVa) bus lines serving the city of Lawrence. This was made possible with funding provided by the city of Lawrence. Lawrence Mayor Daniel Rivera had been influenced by Michelle Wu of Boston's advocacy for fare-free transit when he pushed to implement this program.

=== Systemwide fare-free bus service (2022–present) ===
In February 2022, the MeVa Board voted to launch a two-year pilot program which eliminates fares on bus and paratransit services in all of the municipalities that it serves. The program launched that March. In late 2024, MeVa received state funding to extend the service slightly longer. In October 2024, MeVa was awarded a $2,575,810 grant as part of the state's Fare-Free Pilot.

On February 6th, 2025, the MeVa advisory board voted unanimously to institute a permanent fare-free policy. This made MeVa the first transit authority in Massachusetts to embrace a permanent fare-free policy.

== Worcester Regional Transit Authority (2020–present) ==
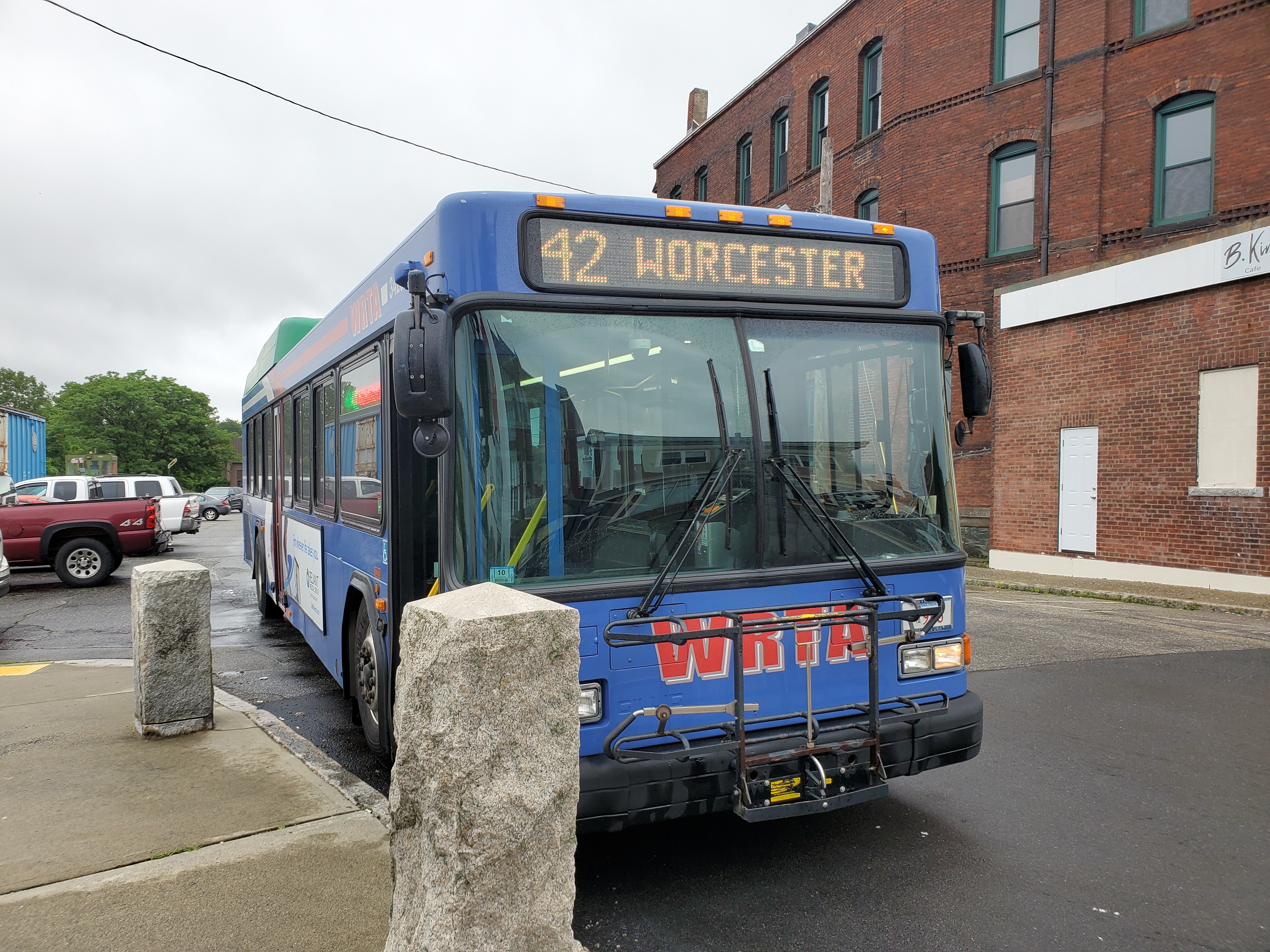
A Worcester Regional Transit Authority bus

The city of Worcester, Massachusetts had been experiencing a movement for fare elimination prior to the COVID-19 pandemic. However, it would not be until the pandemic that this push succeeded in creating an interim fare-free policy. In 2019, Worcester Regional Transit Authority (WRTA) itself began to explore the possibility of running fare-free buses in order to increase ridership and improve transit affordability. Beginning in March 2020, amid the pandemic, WRTA launched an interim fare-elimination program. COVID-19 relief funding has been used as the source of funding for this program.

The fare-elimination has extended several times. Most recently, in April 2023, it was extended to continue through June 2024. In the meeting when this unanimous vote to continue the program was made, several board members declared that the system would need to begin finding alternate forms of funding if it wanted to continue the policy even further into the future due to the limited nature of federal COVID-relief funds.

By 2022, ridership had increased during the free public transport program above what pre-pandemic numbers had been. 2022 ridership on the WRTA bus system was 20% higher than ridership had been before the start of the COVID-19 pandemic, in contrast to most other transit systems in the United States which had seen a decline from pre-pandemic ridership. In 2023, the nonprofit Worcester Regional Research Bureau published a study which indicated that the system was Massachusetts' only transit system to exceed its pre-COVID-19 pandemic bus ridership numbers.

As of 2023, per the Zero Fair Coalition, the WRTA had the longest-running active systemwide fare-free policy of any United States bus system.

== Brockton Area Transit (2021; 2024–present) ==
In 2021, the Brockton Area Transit (BAT) ran a pilot program of free public transit on summer weekends in hopes of regaining ridership lost over the course of the COVID pandemic.

On December 1, 2024, BAT again introduced fare elimination, with an initial $1.4 million grant from the state covering fare elimination through May 31, 2024. In 2024, the city was awarded a $2,582,274 to continue fare free service even longer, as part of the state's Fare-Free Pilot. Funding was renewed in 2025 to allow for fare-free transit through June 2026.

== Franklin Regional Transit Authority (2021; 2024–present) ==
Starting on April 26, 2021, the Franklin Regional Transit Authority (FRTA) ran its fixed bus routes fare-free using COVID-19 relief funding. Every fiscal year since the start of the COVID-19 Pandemic, the FRTA has provided fare-free service as a result of its board voting to continue to provide fare-free service. By late-2024, the FRTA's ridership was greater than it had been pre-pandemic. In the 2025 fiscal year, the program was funded through a $218,173 grant as part of the state's Fare-Free Pilot.

== Pioneer Valley Transit Authority (2022; 2024–present) ==
The Pioneer Valley Transit Authority (PVTA) offered fare-free transit in late-2022 through the state-funded "Try Transit Holiday" initiative.

In 2024, PVTA was awarded $9,511,353 to fund further fare-free transit as part of the state's Fare-Free Pilot. Fare free transit was reintroduced on November 1, 2024.

== Southeastern Regional Transit Authority (2020–21; 2024–present) ==
From March 25, 2020, until April 1, 2021, the Southeastern Regional Transit Authority ran its buses fare-free.

In January 2024, the city resumed offering fare free service on both fixed-route and demand-responsive bus services. This was made possible through funding from the state's "Try Transit" pilot program. Between July and November 2024, ridership on SRTA buses grew by 55.5% (555,878 additional rides) compared to the preceding year. For the 2025 fiscal year (starting in July 2024), a continuation of fare free service was funded through a $3,230,893 grant awarded as part of the state's Fare-Free Pilot.

== Support for free public transport by members of Massachusetts' congressional delegation ==
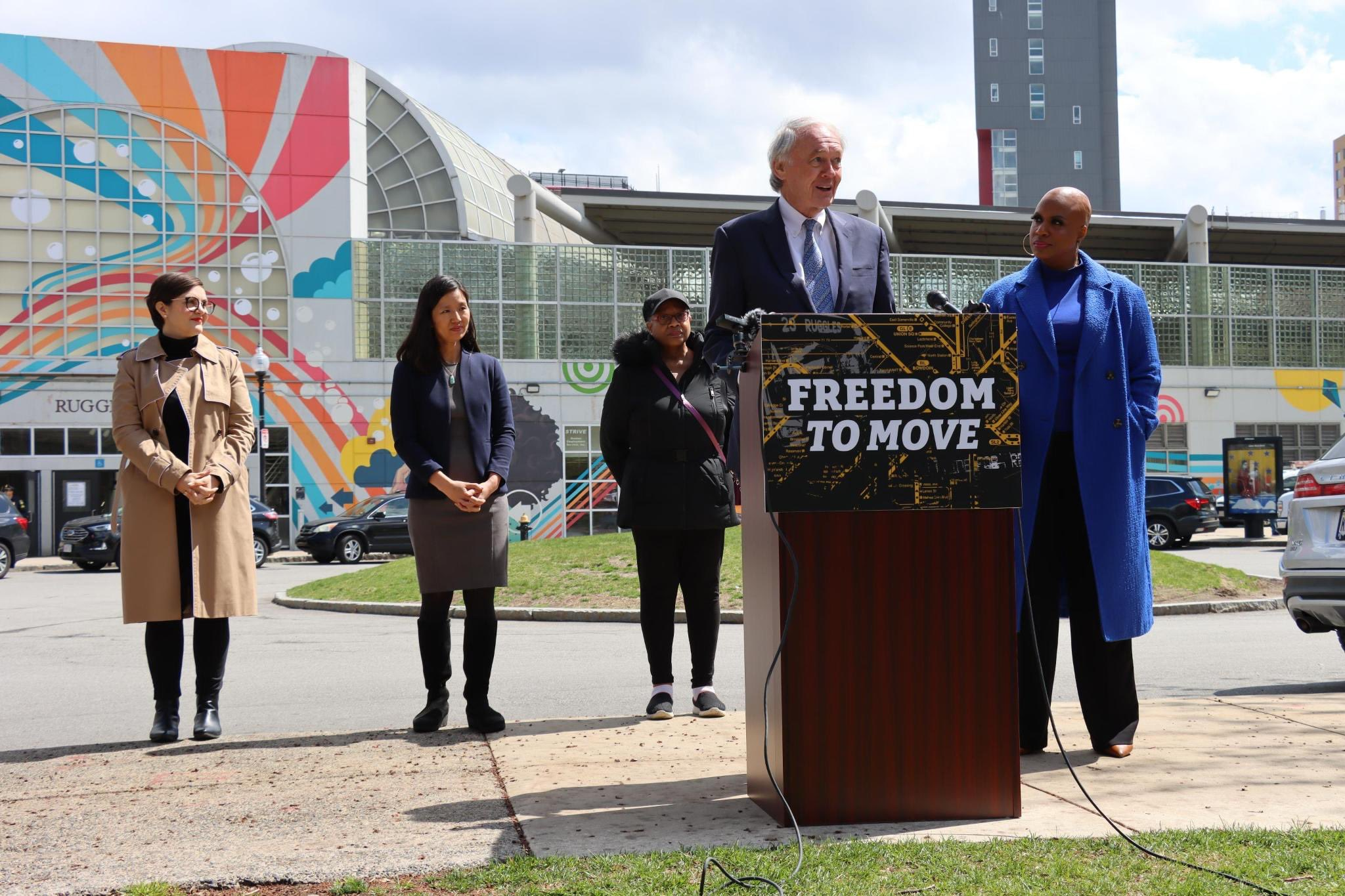
April 2023 press conference by Senator Ed Markey and Congresswoman Ayanna Pressley for their "Freedom to Move" legislation, at which they are joined by Boston Mayor Michelle Wu and others

In June 2020, United States Congresswoman Ayanna Pressley and Massachusetts U.S. Senator Ed Markey proposed a federal bill to establish a $5 billion federal grant program to support localities that operate fare-free bus and rail transit services. They reintroduced the bill in April 2023.
