= Amanda Siebert =

Canadian author

Amanda Siebert is a Canadian author. She wrote The Little Book of Cannabis in 2018, the bestselling nonfiction book about cannabis in Canada as of early 2019. Siebert is a former cannabis columnist for The Georgia Straight, and shared the Canadian Association of Journalists' Don McGillivray Award, given for the "top investigative journalism completed by Canadian media", with coauthor Travis Lupick for their 2016 writing about fentanyl abuse in Vancouver, and she won the Jack Webster Award for excellence in feature/enterprise reporting – print in 2017. Siebert's November 20, 2018 pro-legalization of cannabis op-ed in The New York Times and her authorship of The Little Book of Cannabis were noted by Nonprofit Quarterly.

== Bibliography ==
- The Little Book of Cannabis: How Marijuana Can Improve Your Life. Vancouver: Greystone Books. 2018. ISBN 978-1771644044. OCLC 1078909398.
- Siebert, Amanda (2022). Psyched: Seven Cutting-Edge Psychedelics Changing the World. Greystone Books. ISBN 978-1771648790.
