= North Preston's Finest =

Street gang founded in North Preston, Nova Scotia, Canada

North Preston
- Founded: mid-to-late 1980s
- Named after: North Preston
- Founding location: North Preston, Nova Scotia, Canada
- Ethnicity: African Canadians
- Membership: 60 - 80 members (as of 2009)
- Activities: Pimping, weapons and drug trafficking, money laundering and murder

North Preston's Finest, also known as NPF, the Scotians, or the North Preston gang, is a gang of pimps based in North Preston, a satellite of Dartmouth, Nova Scotia, Canada.

== History ==
The town of North Preston has a population of 3,700, and is located just northeast of Metropolitan Halifax. Benjamin Perrin, a University of British Columbia faculty member who is involved with human trafficking research and activism, wrote extensively about NPF in his 2010 book Invisible Chains, calling North Preston "a place of Shakespearean irony" because of the town's conversion from a sanctuary for Black Loyalists (former American slaves) in the 1780s into the hub of a major gang that deals in modern-day slavery and drug and arms trafficking. There are approximately ten gangs in the Halifax Regional Municipality (HRM), of which NPF is the most prominent. Most of the gang members are Black Canadians from North Preston. In 1996, Phonse Jessome, an investigative journalist, wrote the book Somebody's Daughter about a gang he called the "Toronto/Halifax pimping ring", a gang that Perrin's Invisible Chains identifies with NPF. Despite Jessome's investigation into this gang in the early 1990s, NPF's power has consistently increased since then.

In 2007, the gang was believed to be composed of approximately 50 men. An estimate in 2009 by Michael Chettleburgh, an expert on street gangs who works as a consultant on issues of criminal justice, put NPF's membership between 60 and 80. He also asserts that the age of NPF members mostly ranges between 18 and 28. NPF members have criminal tattoos to signal their membership in the gang, with the neck being the standard location for these tattoos. According to Chettleburgh, NPF first formed in the mid-to-late 1980s. In 1993, Morris Glasgow was sentenced to jail for seven years once he was identified as the crime boss of a nationwide pimping ring, possibly NPF. Peel Regional Police (PRP) vice detective Randy Cowan stated in 2007 that NPF is a family-based gang, with members of the 2000s being the relatives of 1990s members. A warning has been issued to police officers to be extremely careful when encountering NPF members because of the gang's "armed and dangerous" status. Both the Nova Scotia Royal Canadian Mounted Police and the Halifax Regional Police monitor the gang. Like Independent Soldiers, Indian Posse, United Nations, Bo-Gars, Native Syndicate, and Crazy Dragons, NPF has an interprovincial presence. Chettleburgh, the author of Young Thugs: Inside the Dangerous World of Canadian Street Gangs, stated in 2009 that NPF's activities west of Nova Scotia only began approximately ten years earlier, but that the gang's presence had subsequently become well-established in the area of Ontario stretching between Niagara Falls and the Regional Municipality of Peel. The commencement of NPF's activities in southwestern Ontario coincided with their expansion into Quebec. In 2008, Chettleburgh stated that there were approximately 12 confirmed NPF members in Peel. According to Chettleburgh, outlaw motorcycle gangs in the Regional Municipality of Niagara frequently collaborate with NPF. NPF used to have a presence in the Greater Toronto Area (GTA) as well, although Chettleburgh has stated that NPF is no longer very active there. In 2010, PRP Constable Mike Viozzi claimed that NPF had an even stronger presence in Montreal than in Ontario. In Invisible Chains, Perrin argues that NPF has also become active in Western Canada.

== Operations ==
=== Sex trafficking ===
==== Methodology ====
Commercial sexual exploitation and prostitution are NPF's primary activities. NPF is one of the most well-known sex trafficking gangs in Canada, and their sex trafficking activities stretch back at least as far as the 1990s. NPF is one of the few HRM-based gangs that has a presence further west in Canada, and most of these gangs' activities outside the HRM relate to sex trafficking. Perrin argues in Invisible Chains that NPF's relationship with motorcycle gangs is one of competition for control of domestic sex trafficking. Before NPF's expansion into Quebec and southwestern Ontario, motorcycle gangs had controlled sex trafficking in both provinces, but the police had organized major operations to combat these motorcycle gangs, leaving NPF to largely take control of the regional sex industry.

The PRP is Canada's leading police force in the investigation of human trafficking. In 1995, this police force took down another gang that was similar to NPF in its trafficking of young Nova Scotian women into Ontario; in that case, the PRP arrested seven people and issued more than 60 charges. The PRP has investigated the NPF and claims that the gang engages in the trafficking of children, specifically girls. According to the PRP, NPF members live off the earnings of those they procure into prostitution. Chettleburgh has asserted that NPF also controls many girls who work for strip clubs and escort agencies.

NPF members use only a little physical manipulation and a lot of psychological manipulation in controlling the girls and young women they sexually exploit; in this way, NPF's tactics are both effective and comparable to those of many other sex trafficking gangs. Gang members groom the girls, often by approaching them as boyfriends. The PRP suggests that men in the gang often groom three or four girls at the same time without the girls finding out about each other. After grooming a girl in Halifax, her NPF boyfriend has her travel to Niagara-on-the-Lake by way of Peel, Ontario to live in a motel. He then convinces her to work at a strip club in order to help finance the purchase of a condominium in which the two of them might then live. The condominium is a ruse, however. At the strip club, the girl is expected to make $1,000 each night and is not allowed to leave the club until she has done so. This requirement pressures many of the girls into prostitution in the clubs themselves. While performing arrests in these clubs, police officers have seen girls text their pimps in order to beg for permission to leave the club, and the pimps respond stating the requirement that each girl must make $1,000 every night. The girls are also pressured into prostitution by way of violence, intimidation, or threats. For example, the man might threaten to kill the girl's parents. In this way, the gang forces girls into prostitution and into stripping. When a girl tries to get out of prostitution, her pimp demands a fee before she can leave; this fee can be as high as $5,000. One young woman who told the police about how she had been trafficked was subsequently threatened by several of her traffickers, and she therefore retracted her statement, claiming that the police had manipulated her into a false accusation. In response, one police officer recommended that future victims who make statements to the police should be kept away from their pimps and their pimps' associates; this officer stated that sex trafficking victims are used to being under hourly surveillance by their traffickers, and that therefore, once they have made a statement to the police, they need to have constant human contact simply in order to replace the constant contact they previously had with their traffickers.

==== 2007 case ====
In late June 2007, a 19-year-old woman was abducted and sexually assaulted. She was from Dartmouth, and said that Tyson Cain, who the PRP identified as being involved with NPF, befriended her and then forced her into prostitution and stripping. She further claimed that she had been gang raped in an apartment in Mississauga's City Centre that month. The head of the PRP Special Victims Unit, Detective-Sergeant Greg Knapton, suggested that the gang rape was intended to instill enough fear in the woman to manipulate her into the sex industry. On June 27, Cain was arrested; a .22 caliber revolver was found on his person and he was charged with uttering threats, human trafficking, material benefit from prostitution, and gun possession. On July 10, Thomas Junior Downey was arrested in connection with the abduction and assault, as were Spencer Sinclair Thompson and Ernest Downey, Thomas Downey's cousin, on July 27. Anthony Christopher Roberts was also wanted in connection with the crime, and he walked into a police station with his lawyer to turn himself in on the morning of July 31. Both Downeys, Roberts, and Thompson were all charged by the PRP with human trafficking, gang sexual assault, kidnapping, forcible confinement, withholding or destroying documents, and assault. The police claimed that these four men were all either members or affiliates of NPF. Both Ernest Downey and Thompson previously lived in Nova Scotia. Cain went under house arrest in August.

On August 2, Madame Justice Karen Jensen granted Roberts bail in Brampton and allowed him to return to Nova Scotia to go under house arrest in the house where his mother and girlfriend lived. This allowance was unusual in comparison to other similar cases. Roberts' house arrest stipulations required him to stay in the house at all times except when absence was for medical, school, or work purposes; he was also prohibited from obtaining a firearms license. The morning after Roberts' bail hearing, Jensen denied Thomas Downey bail. The evidence presented at both of these bail hearings was kept under a publication ban until the corresponding trials, as was Jensen's reasoning for her differing bail decisions. Thompson's and Ernest Downey's bail hearings were initially scheduled for August 10, but they were postponed to August 13, only to be postponed again because of procedural matters. Ernest Downey's bail was eventually denied, as was Thompson's at a hearing on August 31. On November 28, Cain pleaded guilty to his charge of gun possession. According to the Toronto Sun, it was expected at the time that his other charges would be withdrawn on his January 5 court date the following year. Thomas Downey, Roberts, and Thompson were to go on trial in May 2009, but Roberts' charges were withdrawn before the trial took place. On March 15, 2010, Thomas Downey and Thompson were convicted by jury of aggravated assault, sexual assault, gang sexual assault, kidnapping, and other violent offences. Justice Terry O'Connor sentenced both Thomas Downey and Thompson to 15 years of jail time and deducted 5 years from this sentence in order to account for remand. Both Thomas Downey and Thompson were ordered to submit DNA samples to Canada's DNA registry and were prohibited from owning or handling firearms.

==== Peel Regional Police crackdown ====
In October 2007, the PRP vice squad investigated NPF's activities in strip clubs in Southern Ontario, finding girls who were performing lap dances and allowing other sex acts. The PRP checked the identification of these girls to see if their addresses were in the Maritimes. Randy Cowan subsequently issued a public warning to Maritime girls not to trust NPF, namely because girls who do are at risk of becoming human trafficking victims. Cowan stated that the PRP targets the pimps because prostitution law in Canada makes it difficult to combat prostitution. The following month, the PRP spent three consecutive weekends investigating NPF's activities at strip clubs in the GTA. One GTA police investigator stated that NPF had unrestrained control of the area's bars, and the officer further claimed that NPF members regularly transferred their girls between the bars of Peel and Niagara. The PRP also looked into forming a task force to target NPF specifically. One of the PRP's persistent tactics was to identify NPF members and restrict them from entering strip clubs. Cowan stated that the investigation led to NPF members moving away from Toronto and into other areas, primarily in Western Canada.

PRP investigations into NPF continued in these other areas in hopes of retrieving the required information to shut down NPF's operations. Since then, officers in several major Western Canadian cities have reported members of NPF staking out territorial claims and actively manipulating girls and young women into being sexually trafficked. Previously operating sex traffickers in Western Canada began to fear NPF so much that they began to pay NPF for the right to traffic. Calgary Police Service Sergeant Mark Schwartz claimed that Calgary's non-NPF pimps pay NPF a fee for every girl they prostitute so as to avoid violent confrontations with NPF. Because NPF began their human trafficking activities in Western Canada partially in response to the PRP's investigations into their activities in southwestern Ontario, Benjamin Perrin argues in Invisible Chains that municipal and provincial police forces and the Royal Canadian Mounted Police need to work together to combat gangs involved in human trafficking; in this way, Perrin advocates a Canadian version of the United States Human Trafficking Task Forces, whereby police units would be created specifically to counter human trafficking across jurisdictions. NPF's move away from Toronto led to several other gangs taking control of the sex trafficking in the area. Two of these gangs were made up of Haitian Canadians who called themselves the "Bloods" and the "Crips" after two prominent American gangs. There were also individual non-gang-members and gangs of Jamaican Canadians that took over some of the illegal sex-trafficking activities that NPF had previously undertaken in the area. One strip-club manager blamed NPF for manipulating his employees and gaining control of various parts of his business. PRP Constable Mike Viozzi asserted that NPF and the Haitian gangs were more deadly than the area's motorcycle gangs because both NPF and the Haitian gangs readily shot people to death.

In 2008, the PRP sealed Canada's first two convictions for human trafficking, setting a precedent for future human trafficking cases. The Canadian law against human trafficking was instituted in the Criminal Code three years earlier. In both of these cases, females were forced into prostitution and required to relinquish their earnings to their traffickers. The PRP was maintaining nine human trafficking charges before the courts by December 2008, including two cases allegedly involving NPF.

==== 2008 case ====
Also in 2008, 19-year-old Stefano Jemile Dixon and 21-year-old Jordan Isaiah Cromwell, both believed by the Halton Regional Police Service (HRPS) to be members of NPF, were charged in connection with a case in which the HRPS stated that a 17-year-old girl was forced to work as a stripper. The HRPS claimed that the girl had been coerced into stripping at a strip club in Mississauga by Dixon and Cromwell, two men she had met in November of that year, when she was still 16 years old. The HRPS initially kept the name of the strip club a secret from the public so that interviews would be untainted with the information. HRPS Detective-Sergeant Al Albano stated that the girl had first been introduced to one of the men through friends, after which point the man seduced her in the manner typical of NPF, resulting in her starting to work at the strip club. The girl told the police that Dixon and Cromwell promised her monetary recompense for working at the club and that she was given forged ID so she would be able to do so, but that after stripping at the club on two occasions, she was required to give all of her earnings to Dixon and Cromwell, who also attempted to prostitute her. Albano asserted that Dixon and Cromwell continued to tell the girl that she would receive money eventually if she continued to strip at the club, but she never received any money. The HRPS contended that the girl tried to escape on two ccasions, but was assaulted on both occasions and was forced to continue stripping at the club, unless she was able to pay an exit fee of thousands of dollars, a fee which she could not pay because Dixon and Cromwell confiscated all of her money. The police stated that she was thenceforward forcibly transported to and from the club. The girl was kept at a townhouse in Burlington. A year prior, this townhouse was identified as linked to NPF by a Burlington police force specializing in gangs and gun violence. A senior NPF member was the townhouse's landlord.

Early in the morning on December 3, while Dixon and Cromwell were sleeping, the girl successfully escaped, after which point she found friends. Out of concern, one of these friends contacted the HRPS. On December 4, the HRPS raided the townhouse the girl had escaped from, to discover $3,870 in cash along with other evidence against Dixon and Cromwell. The police SWAT team, which was heavily armed, arrested Dixon and Cromwell along with a young woman, although the woman was released without charges. Both men were charged with sexual exploitation, human trafficking, withholding documents for human trafficking, material benefit from human trafficking, and forcible confinement, as well as drug possession. Dixon was additionally charged with sexual exploitation and assault.

==== 2009 case ====
In late August 2009, a 19-year-old woman flew from Edmonton, Alberta to Toronto to meet a man she had met online. According to this woman, she had only planned on staying in Ontario for a week. The man she was visiting introduced her to another woman who worked as a stripper and who then brought her to a strip club in Mississauga. The stripper introduced the 19-year-old woman to Marlo Williams, a man with connections to Nova Scotia and possibly to NPF. The 19-year-old woman ostensibly became Williams' girlfriend, and she moved into Williams' condominium in Mississauga. In September, Williams allegedly forced her through intimidation into stripping at one of the city's strip clubs and into giving him all her earnings, which amounted to approximately $1,500 in the space of a week. Investigators stated that she was only allowed to leave Williams' condominium to strip at the club. The woman tried to escape on August 18, but was unsuccessful. She later claimed that Williams caught her and dragged her by the hair back to his condominium, where she was verbally abused, assaulted, and strangled to the point of unconsciousness. When she revived, she conducted a suicide attempt. Because the woman knew no one in the province and had no money, she felt that she had no other choice but to continue stripping and relinquishing her earnings to Williams. Before the end of September, she tried to escape Williams' condominium again and succeeded, eventually going to the police.

On October 15, Williams was arrested, and ammunition was found in his condominium. Williams' victim later testified that he had shown her a gun, although a gun was not found in the condominium. By the time of his arrest, Williams was already wanted for breaching probation, failure to appear in court, and driving while disqualified. On the day after his arrest, Williams was charged with human trafficking, forcible confinement, choking, kidnapping, assault, and theft. Williams received the first human trafficking charge issued by York Regional Police (YRP). Because of the similarity between this case and several NPF-related cases involving men trafficking in women and young girls at strip clubs in Mississauga, YRP Detective-Sergeant Henry Deruiter considered the possibility that Williams had connections to NPF. On June 11, 2010, Williams pleaded guilty to six charges: possession of ammunition contrary to a prohibition order, forcible confinement, breach of recognizance, assault, resisting arrest, and breach of probation. Williams' criminal defence lawyer, Peter Thorning, argued that Williams should receive a jail sentence equal to the time Williams had spent in remand, and that Williams' sentence should therefore be considered to have already been served. Michael Demczur, the Crown attorney argued for a four-year sentence for Williams. The sentence that Justice Anne-Marie Hourigan gave Williams was halfway between the two: a three-year sentence with one year deducted for time already served.

Before his 2010 conviction, Williams had received other convictions: he was convicted of assault causing bodily harm in 2005, failure to stop at the scene of an accident and refusal to provide a breath sample in 2007, and uttering threats to his landlord in 2009. For his conviction in 2005, he was sentenced a 12-month probation and a $100 fine, while his 2007 convictions resulted in a $1200 fine and a year-long licence suspension.

At the end of the 2010 trial, Hourigan concluded that Williams' relationship with his 19-year-old victim was "exploitive and oppressive in nature". Hourigan also asserted that Williams' victim has since suffered from depression, low self-esteem, identity crises, nightmares, and insomnia, and has turned to binge drinking as a form of self-medication. Hourigan's sentencing decision was not primarily based on the crimes to which Williams pleaded guilty but rather on Williams' aggravation of those crimes by way of his treatment of the victim. Thorning found the sentence disappointingly long for a young man, but Hourigan stated that she wanted Williams' sentence to stand as a warning "that persons in the position of the defendant cannot take advantage of persons... in the position of the complainant". Demczur concurred that the punishment of "individuals who prey on the vulnerable" is not the only purpose of such sentences, but that these sentences also grant protection to people "in desperate need of that protection".

=== Drug trafficking ===
Chettleburgh claims that the illegal drug trade is one of NPF's two main activities, the other being human trafficking. He also claims that NPF combines these activities. In 2006, the Niagara Regional Police Service (NRPS) were investigating drug dealers who were using mobile phones to make transactions involving cocaine. After NRPS investigators called a number and ordered $120 worth of cocaine from someone self-identifying as "T", the drugs were delivered by Tyrone Johnston, a man from North Preston with suspected connections to NPF. The NRPS then arrested Johnston, who was later sentenced to 90 days in jail. Bobbie Walker served as Johnston's criminal defense lawyer and told the court that Johnston accepted responsibility both for his long criminal record and for recently impregnating his girlfriend. In a 2008 raid of a townhouse in Burlington inhabited by two alleged members of NPF, HRPS officers discovered 3 grams of cannabis. Dixon and Cromwell, the two inhabitants of the house, were both subsequently charged with drug possession in addition to human-trafficking-related crimes.

=== Robbery ===
In 2003, Johnston and Lloyd "Butchie" Orman, also of North Preston, were implicated in a shooting at the intersection of Queen Street and St. Lawrence Avenue in Niagara Falls. The NRPS stated that Orman and Johnston robbed three males after having ordered them out of a car. The police further asserted that Orman and Johnston shot guns during the robbery, stabbed two of their victims, and gave the third a hit to the head, leaving the three victims with wounds that were not life-threatening. The NRPS released an arrest warrant for both Orman and Johnston, calling them armed and dangerous. Johnston was arrested in 2006 and served 90 days of jail time for various crimes. The following July, Johnston was again brought before court, this time in St. Catharines, where it was stated that Johnston had accused two men of robbery. When the two men denied the accusation, Johnston struck two men in the face and let them go. Johnston was sentenced to 90 days in jail, one year of probation, and 10 years' restriction from owning firearms and other weapons.

=== Homicide ===
The PRP asserts that members of the NPF have been implicated in homicide cases. NPF members have been allegedly involved in two homicides in Niagara Falls, Ontario, one case being the homicide of a tourist and another involving a shooting near a house party. This crowded house party was attended primarily by young men from Nova Scotia and young female strippers. Orman was convicted of the homicide associated with this party. Orman fatally shot Phillip James "Rabbit" Simmons, a 33-year-old man also from North Preston, on Niagara Falls' Malibu Drive in March 2006. Orman shot between eleven and twelve times, hitting Simmons in the groin, abdomen, and hand. The house party quickly dispersed, and Simmons was later discovered covered in blood and lying in the doorway of the house. More than two years later, in December 2008, Orman pleaded guilty to both manslaughter and forcible confinement, after which he was sentenced to six years and four months in prison. Even though NPF was not mentioned in sentencing, Orman had an NPF tattoo on his neck that was visible in court.

On October 4, 2009, Johnston was found shot to death at a townhouse in Niagara Falls. Witnesses saw two men leave the townhouse soon after at least three gunshots were fired. Johnston's homicide was investigated by the head of the NRPS, Detective Staff Sergeant Brett Flynn, who stated that it was possible that Johnston's death was the result of gang violence. Flynn furthermore stated that he hoped the investigation would reveal whether or not Johnston was a NPF member.

== Bibliography ==
- Benjamin Perrin (2010). Invisible Chains: Canada's Underground World of Human Trafficking. Toronto: Viking Press. ISBN 978-0-670-06453-3.
- Mark Totten (2012). Nasty, Brutish, and Short: The Lives of Gang Members in Canada. Toronto: James Lorimer & Company. ISBN 978-1-4594-0038-2.
