= George Ryga Award for Social Awareness in Literature =

The George Ryga Award for Social Awareness in Literature is a literary award given to a British Columbian author "who has achieved an outstanding degree of social awareness in a new book published in the preceding calendar year." The prize was created in 2004 by Alan Twigg, publisher of BC Book World, along with John Lent of Okanagan College and Ken Smedley, then working for the George Ryga Centre Society. In 2014 Alan Twigg took over responsibility for the award after the sale of Ryga House. Originally the prize included a sculpture/plaque by sculptor, Reg Kienast, entitled The Censor's Golden Rope. Now it includes a cash award of $2,500.

== Nominees and winners ==
Year	Winner	Finalists
2004; Judge: Craig McLuckie	Maggie De Vries, Missing Sarah: A Vancouver Woman Remembers Her Vanished Sister	Marie Clements, Burning Vision; Matt Hern, Field Day: Getting Society Out of School; Patricia E. Roy, The Oriental Question: Consolidating a White Man's Province, 1914-41
2005; Judge: Ross Tyner	Robert Hunter, The Greenpeace to Amchitka: An Environmental Odyssey	Stephen Hume and Alexandra Morton, A Stain Upon the Sea: West Coast Salmon Farming; Roy Miki, Redress: Inside the Japanese Canadian Call for Justice
2006; Judge: Myrna Kotash	Leslie A. Robertson and Dara Culhane, In Plain Sight: Reflections on Life in Downtown Eastside Vancouver	Jean Barman, Stanley Park's Secret: The Forgotten Families of Whoi Whoi, Kanaka Ranch, and Brockton Point; Michael Kluckner, Vanishing British Columbia
2007; Judge: Sharon Josephson	Harold Rhenisch, The Wolves at Evelyn: Journeys Through a Dark Century	Daniel Francis, Red Light Neon: A History of Vancouver's Sex Trade; Lynne Van Luven, Nobody's Mother: Life Without Kids
2008; Judge: Ivan Townshend	Leilah Nadir, The Orange Trees of Baghdad: In Search of My Lost Family	Gary Geddes, Falsework; Ernest Hekkanen, Of a Fire Beyond the Hills
2009; Judge: Ivan Townshend	Steven Galloway, The Cellist of Sarajevo	Brian Dedora, A Slice of Voice at the Edge of Hearing; JoAnn Dionne, Little Emperors: A Year with the Future of China; Manjit Virk, Reena: A Father's Story
2010; Judge: Greg Simison	Larry Campbell, Neil Boyd and Lori Culbert, A Thousand Dreams: Vancouver's Downtown Eastside and the Fight for Its Future	Elizabeth Bachinsky, God of Missed Connections; Kevin Loring, Where the Blood Mixes
2011; Judge: Andrew Steeves	Richard Wagamese, One Story, One Song	Gabor Gasztonyi, A Room in the City: Photographs of Gabor Gasztonyi; Sylvia Olsen, Working with Wool: A Coast Salish Legacy and the Cowichan Sweater; Benjamin Perrin, Invisible Chains: Canada's Underground World of Human Trafficking; John Vaillant, The Tiger: A True Story of Vengeance and Survival
2012	No award presented	
2013; Judge: Angie Abdou	Joel Bakan, Childhood Under Siege: How Big Business Targets Children	Michael Christie, The Beggar's Garden; Howard White, A Hard Man to Beat: The Story of Bill White, Labour Leader, Historian, Shipyard Worker, Raconteur
2014; Judge: Sean Johnston	Bev Sellars, They Called Me Number One: Secrets and Survival at an Indian Residential School	Adrienne Fitzpatrick, The Earth Remembers Everything; Gillian Wigmore, Dirt of Ages
2015; Jury: George Brandak, Anne Chudyk, Beverly Cramp	Shelley Wright, Our Ice is Vanishing / Sikuvat Nunguliqtuq: A History of Inuit, Newcomers, and Climate Change	Michael Buckley, Meltdown in Tibet: China's Reckless Destruction of Ecosystems from the Highlands of Tibet to the Deltas of Asia; Ann Rogers and John Hill, Unmanned: Drone Warfare and Global Security
2016; Jury: Trevor Carolan, Jane Curry, George Johnson	Andrew MacLeod, A Better Place on Earth: The Search for Fairness in Super Unequal British Columbia''	David R. Boyd, The Optimistic Environmentalist: Progressing Toward a Greener Future; Larry Gambone, No Regrets; Chris and Josh Hergesheimer, The Flour Peddlar; Carrie Saxifrage, The Big Swim: Coming Ashore in a World Adrift; David Suzuki, Letters to My Grandchildren
2017; Jury: Trevor Carolan, Jane Curry, Beverley Cramp	Wade Davis, Wade Davis: Photographs	Stephen Collis, Once in Blockadia; Ivan Coyote, Tomboy Survival Guide; Marc Edge, The News We Deserve: The Transformation of Canada's Media Landscape; James Hoggan with Grania Litwin, I'm Right and You're an Idiot: The Toxic State of Public Discourse and How to Clean It Up; Eric Jamieson, The Native Voice: The Story of How Maisie Hurley and Canada's First Aboriginal Newspaper Changed a Nation; Alan Livingstone MacLeod, Remembered in Bronze and Stone: Canada's Great War Memorial Statuary; Christopher Pollon and Ben Nelms, The Peace in Peril: The Real Cost of the Site C Dam; Anton Scamvougeras, Dysconnected: Humans Isolated by their Personal Technology; Ron Smith, The Defiant Mind: Living Inside a Stroke
2018	Travis Lupick, Fighting for Space: How a Group of Drug Users Transformed One City's Struggle with Addiction''	Gary Geddes, Medicine Unbundled: A Journey through the Minefields of Indigenous Health Care; David Suzuki and Ian Hanington, Just Cool It! The Climate Crisis and What We Can Do
2019	Rod Mickleburgh, On the Line: A History of the British Columbia Labour Movement''	
2020	Diane Pinch, Passion & Persistence: Fifty Years of the Sierra Club in British Columbia''	The Graphic History Collective and David Lester, 1919: A Graphic History of the Winnipeg Strike; Wendy Wickwire, At the Bridge: James Teit and an Anthropology of Belonging; Ross Hoffman with Alfred Joseph, Song of the Earth: The Life of Alfred Joseph; Philip Huynh, The Forbidden Purple City
2021	Geoff Mynett, Service on the Skeena: Horace Wrinch, Frontier Physician''	Jean Barman, On the Cusp of Contact: Gender, Space, and Race in the Colonization of B.C.; Emma Hansen, Still: Love, Loss, and Motherhood; Benjamin Perrin, Overdose: Heartbreak and Hope in Canada's Opioid Crisis; Maureen Webb, Coding Democracy: How Hackers are Disrupting Power, Surveillance, and Authoritarianism
2022	Alexandra Morton, Not On My Watch: How a Renegade Whale Biologist Took on Governments and Industry to Save Wild Salmon''	Darrel J. McLeod, Peyakow: Reclaiming Cree Dignity; Suzanne Simard, Finding the Mother Tree: Discovering the Wisdom of the Forest; David Spaner, Solidarity: Canada's Unknown Revolution of 1983; Jody Wilson-Raybould, “Indian” in the Cabinet: Speaking Truth to Power
