= Ron Smith (Canadian author) =

American poet & author (born 1943)

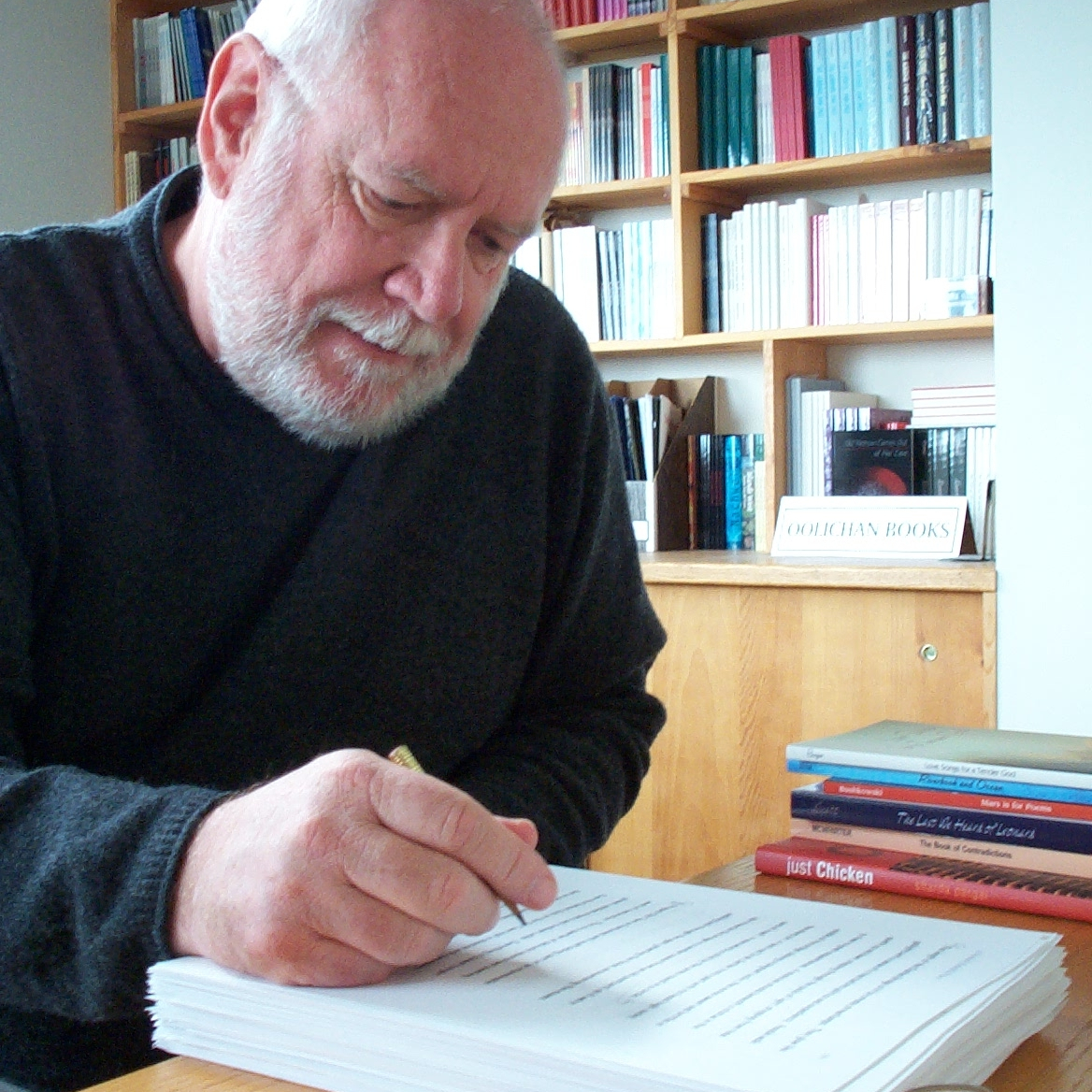
- Ron Smith editing a manuscript.
- Born: 1943 (age 82–83); Vancouver, British Columbia, Canada
- Education: University of British Columbia (BA) University of Leeds, (MA) University of British Columbia, (D.Litt)
- Occupations: Poet, author, playwright, former academic, and publisher
- Spouse: Patricia Jean Smith (married 1969-present)
- Website: http://www.ronsmith.ca/

Ron Smith (born 1943) is a Canadian poet, author, playwright, former academic, publisher, and the founder of Oolichan Books.

== Biography ==
Smith was born in Vancouver, British Columbia. He studied English literature at the University of British Columbia and at the University of Leeds, and returned to Vancouver Island in 1971 to teach at Malaspina College (now Vancouver Island University) in Nanaimo, British Columbia, where he taught English and creative writing for 28 years. In 2019, he was designated Professor Emeritus by the Senate of VIU.

Smith was also awarded an honorary doctorate by the University of British Columbia in 2002. In 2004, he was a visiting professor at Gabriele d'Annunzio University in Pescara, Italy and taught courses in the North American Studies post-graduate programme. In 2005 he was the inaugural Distinguished Fulbright Chair in Creative Writing at Arizona State University.

In 1974, he founded the publishing company Oolichan Books. A successful grant application to the Canada Council in 1975 enabled the press to become an independent publisher. The operation was located in Smith's hometown of Lantzville, a small seaside village on Vancouver Island. In 2011, he received the Gray Campbell Distinguished Service Award for his contribution to publishing in British Columbia. Smith now lives with his wife, Patricia Jean Smith, also a writer, in Nanoose Bay, British Columbia. In 2009, he sold the press after 34 years.

From 1988 to 1991, Smith was the fiction editor for Douglas & McIntyre. He has been called "instrumental" in helping Randy Fred to start the first aboriginal publishing house, Theytus Books, in 1981.

He is the author of a suite of poems, Seasonal (1984), a long poem, A Buddha Named Baudelaire (1988), two other collections of poetry and a collection of fiction, What Men Know About Women (1999), an illustrated children's title Elf the Eagle (2007) which was short-listed for the BC Book Prizes and the Saskatchewan Young Readers Award, The Shining Willow Award, a biography, Kid Dynamite: The Gerry James Story, about a remarkable athlete who at one time held 18 CFL records and in one year competed for the Grey Cup as a Winnipeg Blue Bomber and the Stanley Cup as a member of the Toronto Maple Leafs (2011), and a memoir, The Defiant Mind: Living Inside a Stroke (2016), which was long-listed for the George Ryga award and won the Independent Publisher IPPY Gold Medal in the States for autobiography/memoir (2017). In 2018, an excerpt from The Defiant Mind was translated into sixteen languages and published by Reader's Digest in over twenty countries. In 2020, he co-authored and published a medical memoir with Dr. Bernard Binns entitled: Improbable Journeys: from Crossing the Himalayas on Horseback to a Career in Obstetrics and Gynaecology. A sequel to Elf the Eagle entitled Elf's Family Tree was published by Rock's Mills Press in 2023.

Over the past forty years he has been invited to give public readings or lectures at universities and schools across Canada, in the States (at UC Berkeley, Gonzaga, Western Washington, ASU, Washington State), England (at London Polytechnic, Leeds), Italy (at universities in Rome, Bologna, Venice, Udine, Siena, Pescara, where he was guest lecturer in the North American Studies Program), and in Albania.

Smith also reviews books, and co-edited the anthology of Canadian West Coast short fiction: Rainshadow: Stories from Vancouver Island (1982). He also edited Poetry Hotel: Selected Poems by Joe Rosenblatt (1985), the Collected Works of Ralph Gustafson, vol. 1 and 2 (1987) and New & Selected Poems by W. H. New (2015).

His poetry was translated by Ada Donati and published in a bilingual edition in Ferrara, Italy, 2002. He also served on the Board of the B.C. Arts Council from 2008 to 2012 and has volunteered for several years as a lay reviewer on research applications for the Heart and Stroke Foundation of Canada. Since 2015 he has toured western Canada and the United States to talk about his stroke experience with stroke survivors and health professionals.

== Bibliography ==
=== Anthologies ===
- Rainshadow: Stories from Vancouver Island. Sono Nis/Oolichan (co-editor, 1982)

=== Biography ===
- Kid Dynamite: The Gerry James Story. Oolichan (2011)
- The Defiant Mind: Living Inside a Stroke. Ronsdale (2016)
- Improbable Journeys: from Crossing the Himalayas on Horseback to a Career in Obstetrics and Gynaecology. Rock's Mills Press (2020)

=== Poetry ===
- Seasonal. Sono Nis (1984)
- A Buddha Named Baudelaire. Sono Nis (1988)
- Enchantment & Other Demons. Oolichan (1995)
- Arabesque e altre poesie, Schifanoia Editore, Italy (2002)

=== Fiction ===
- The Last Time We Talked, Reference West (1996)
- What Men Know About Women Oolichan (1999)

=== Children's literature ===
- Elf the Eagle Oolichan. (2007) ISBN 0-88982-241-7. Reprint, Rock's Mills Press. (2023)
- Elf's Family Tree Rock's Mills Press. (2023)

=== Editor ===
- Poetry Hotel: Selected Poems of Joe Rosenblatt. McClelland & Stewart (1985)
- Collected Poems of Ralph Gustafson, vol. 1 & 2. Sono Nis (1987)
- New and Selected Poems of W. H. New. Oolichan Books (2015)
