= Third Sector New England =

American nonprofit organization

Third Sector New England (or TSNE) is a 501(c)(3) organization based in Boston, Massachusetts, providing management and leadership resources to fellow nonprofits.

Some of its current initiatives are:

- Consulting and Coaching
- Executive Transition and Search
- Fiscal Sponsorship Services
- Grants for Capacity Building
- Management and Leadership Training
- Multi-Tenant NonProfit Center
- Organizational Transitions

Third Sector New England is oriented to progressive social change, and claims to uphold values such as cultural diversity and economic justice.

"TSNE also incubated and supported the development of the Nonprofit Quarterly magazine from 1997 through 2006, when it spun off as an independent publication."
