= Tamio Wakayama =

Canadian artist (1941–2018)

- Born: April 3, 1941
- Died: March 23, 2018 (aged 76)
- Known for: photography

Tamio Wakayama (1941–2018) was a Canadian photographer. He is known for his photographs of the American civil rights movement.

Wakayama was born on April 3, 1941 in Canada. A self-described Nisei, his family was relocated and incarcerated at the Tashme Incarceration Camp in British Columbia through the duration of World War II.

Wakayama traveled to the United States during the time of Freedom Summer. He began taking photos for the Student Nonviolent Coordinating Committee. Returning to Canada, Wakayama photographed the Japanese Canadian community through the 1970s and 1980s.

Wakayama died on March 23, 2018.

In 2025 the Vancouver Art Gallery held a retrospective of his work entitled Enemy Alien: Tamio Wakayama. Paul Wong's exhibition book, blending critical essays about Wakayama's work with photographs and excerpts from his own unpublished memoir Soul on Rice, won the Roderick Haig-Brown Regional Prize from the BC and Yukon Book Prizes in 2026.

Wakayama's work was included in the 2025 exhibition Photography and the Black Arts Movement, 1955–1985 at the National Gallery of Art. His work is in the collection of the National Gallery of Art, and the National Gallery of Canada.

He is the subject of the documentary Between Pictures: The Lens of Tamio Wakayama by Cindy Mochizuki.

== See also ==
- List of photographers of the civil rights movement
