= Elizabeth Bachinsky =

Canadian poet

- Born: May 10, 1976 (age 50); Regina, Saskatchewan, Canada
- Occupation: Poet
- Writing career
- Genre: poetry
- Notable work: God of Missed Connections

Elizabeth Bachinsky (born May 10, 1976) is a Canadian poet. She has published six collections since 2005: Curio, Home of Sudden Service, God of Missed Connections, I Don't Feel So Good, The Hottest Summer in Recorded History, and Real Grownup. Her second book, Home of Sudden Service, was nominated for a 2006 Governor General's Award for Poetry. Bachinsky's work has appeared in literary journals and anthologies in Canada, the U.S., France, Ireland, the U.K., China and Lebanon.

== Personal life ==
Bachinsky was born on May 10, 1976, in Regina, Saskatchewan, and grew up in Prince George, British Columbia. She has an MFA in creative writing from the University of British Columbia. She lives in Vancouver, British Columbia, where she teaches creative writing at Douglas College. From 2006 to 2014, she was the editor of Event, a Vancouver literary journal.

== Prizes and honours ==
- 2004: Nominee, Bronwen Wallace Memorial Award
- 2006: Nominee, Governor General's Award for English-language poetry (for Home of Sudden Service)
- 2009: Nominee, Kobzar Literary Award
- 2009: Nominee, Pat Lowther Award
- 2010: Shortlist, George Ryga Award for Social Awareness in Literature
- 2014: Nominee, Pat Lowther Award

== Bibliography ==
=== Poetry ===
- 2005: Curio BookThug
- 2006: Home of Sudden Service Nightwood Editions
- 2009: God of Missed Connections Nightwood Editions
- 2012: I Don't Feel So Good BookThug
- 2013: The Hottest Summer in Recorded History Nightwood Editions
- 2026: Real Grownup Nightwood Editions

=== Anthologies ===
- 2004: Pissing Ice: An Anthology of "New" Canadian Poets BookThug
- 2005: In Fine Form: The Canadian Book of Form Poetry Polestar
- 2008: Jailbreaks: 99 Canadian Sonnets Biblioasis
- 2009: Fist of the Spider Woman: Tales of Fear and Queer Desire Arsenal Pulp Press
- 2009: How the Light Gets In University of New Waterford, Ireland
- 2009: Verse Map of Vancouver Anvil Press

== See also ==
- Canadian literature
- Canadian poetry
- List of Canadian poets
- List of Canadian writers
