= Worcester Regional Transit Authority =

Bus system in Worcester, Massachusetts

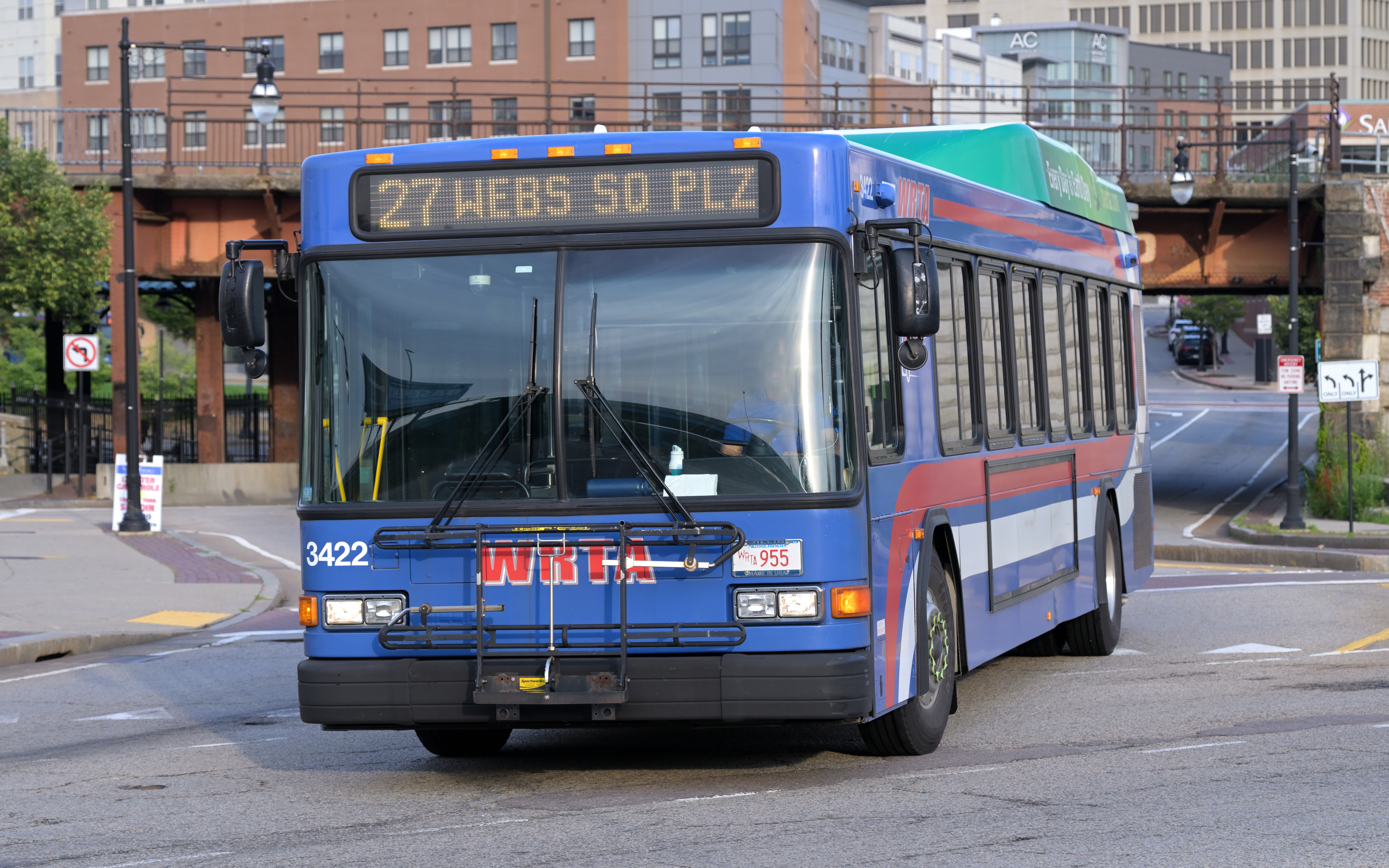
- A WRTA bus at Washington Square in 2025
- Founded: 1974
- Headquarters: WRTA Hub, 60 Foster St.
- Locale: Worcester, Massachusetts
- Service type: bus service, paratransit
- Hubs: Union Station Hub
- Depots: WRTA Garage, 42 Quinsigamond Ave.
- Annual ridership: 4,500,000
- Operator: Central Mass Transit Management
- Administrator: Joshua Rickman
- Website: therta.com

Worcester Regional Transit Authority (WRTA) is a public, non-profit organization charged with providing public transportation to the city of Worcester, Massachusetts and the surrounding towns. The WRTA was created in September 1974 under Chapter 161B of the Massachusetts General Laws. This act also created several other regional transit authorities in Massachusetts, including the Greater Attleboro-Taunton Regional Transit Authority and the Pioneer Valley Transit Authority among others; in terms of ridership, the WRTA is the second largest regional transit authority and third largest transit system in Massachusetts.

WRTA buses have been free to ride since March 2020, making it the longest-running fare-free system of public transportation in the United States. Currently, the fare-free program is extended until June 2026.

== History ==
Public transit in Worcester began with the Worcester Horse Railway in 1861. It was merged in 1887 into the Worcester Consolidated Street Railway, which electrified its lines between 1891 and 1893. The system grew through construction of city lines and acquisitions of suburban lines until the 1910s. It began replacing unprofitable lines with buses in 1924. In 1932, it was sold and reorganized as the Worcester Street Railway. Bus substitutions continued, with the final streetcars operating in 1945. In 1953, it was sold and renamed as the Worcester Bus Company.

In April 1971, the city received a $597,057 federal grant to purchase 34 new buses for the company to use. By that time, the company was in poor financial condition. In August 1973, the owners threatened to shut down the company. The company received a one-year, $300,000 state subsidy (equivalent to $2 million in 2025) as part of legislation in November 1973 that also established regional transit authorities.

The WRTA was created in September 1974 along with several other regional transit authorities in Massachusetts, including the Greater Attleboro Taunton Regional Transit Authority and the Pioneer Valley Transit Authority. Daily ridership on the Worcester Bus Company had dropped to 20,000 by July 1975, when a two-month strike again nearly collapsed the company. The company lost the Worcester Public Schools bus contract, which it had held for decades, in 1977. The WRTA purchased the company's assets in 1978. On June 30, 1978, the WRTA contract switched to a different company to run the system; with no more operating contracts, the Worcester Bus Company was closed.

Before the free-fare system, fare revenues covered just 7% of the WRTA's expenses, coming in at $3 million in FY2019. In 2020, WRTA made the bus service free to ride. Currently, the fare-free program is extended until June 2026. In fiscal year 2024, the WRTA provided 4.5 million rides, the highest of any year in the 21st century and coming after pandemic-era lows of 875,000 in 2020.

== Routes ==
The WRTA currently provides fixed route bus service to Worcester, and the surrounding towns of Auburn, Brookfield, East Brookfield, Leicester, Millbury, Oxford, Shrewsbury, Southbridge, Spencer, Webster, West Boylston. In addition to its fixed route bus service, the WRTA provides Community Shuttle Flex Van Service (limited shuttle service) to Grafton, Northbridge, and Westborough. The WRTA also provides paratransit service to a total of 37 communities in Central Massachusetts.

The WRTA's Operations and Maintenance Center is located at 42 Quinsigamond Ave in Worcester's Green Island Neighborhood. This new garage replaces the old one, meant to be a trolley yard, holding just 1/2 of the new capacity. The WRTA's previous facility is now home to a shopping center.

=== Fixed routes ===
Route #	Route Name
1	Union Station Hub - Walmart 146 via Providence & Granite St.
2	Union Station Hub - Tatnuck Square via Pleasant St.
3	Union Station Hub - Worcester State University via Highland St.
4	Union Station Hub - The Shoppes at Blackstone Valley via Millbury St.
5	Union Station Hub - Blithewood/Massasoit via Grafton St.
6	Union Station Hub - West Tatnuck via Chandler St.
7	Union Station Hub - Washington Heights Apts. via Mill St.
825	Park Ave Connector
11	Union Station Hub - The Fair Plaza via Vernon Hill and Greenwood St.
12	Union Station Hub - Edgemere Crossing and DTA/RMV via Grafton St.
14	Union Station Hub - Market32 and QCC via Burncoat St.
15	Union Station Hub - Shrewsbury Center via Shrewsbury St. & Route 9
16	Union Station Hub - Lincoln Plaza via Hamilton St. & Lake Ave.
19	Union Station Hub - Webster Square Plaza or Goddard Dr or Leicester (or Spencer) DPW - Clark University via Main St.
23	Union Station Hub - East Mountain Street via Lincoln St.
24	Union Station Hub - UMass Medical Center via Belmont St.
26	Union Station Hub - Great Brook Valley via Lincoln St.
27	Union Station Hub - Auburn Mall via Main St.
29	Union Station Hub - Southbridge - Charlton.
30	Union Station Hub - W. Boylston Wal-Mart via Grove St. & W. Boylston St.
31	Union Station Hub - Lincoln Plaza via Grove St. & West Boylston St.
33	Union Station Hub - Spencer - Brookfield via Main St. & Rt. 9
42	Union Station Hub - Oxford - Webster via Southbridge St. & Rt. 12

=== Community Shuttle Flex Van Service ===
Route	Route Name
Route A	Northbridge Walmart - Shoppes at Blackstone Valley via Fisherville
Route B	New Village - Rockdale - Stop & Stop - Grafton MBTA Station
Westborough Shuttle	Westborough MBTA to Computer Drive (Commuter) / Westborough Local
Southbridge, Dudley, Webster Shuttle	via routes 29 & 42

== Fleet ==
The Worcester Regional Transit Authority operates a fleet of 46 Gillig Low Floor buses, 6 Proterra EcoRide battery electric buses, and 35 Ford E350 minibuses.

== See also ==
- Free public transport in Massachusetts
- New England Transit
