= Travis Lupick =

Canadian journalist and author

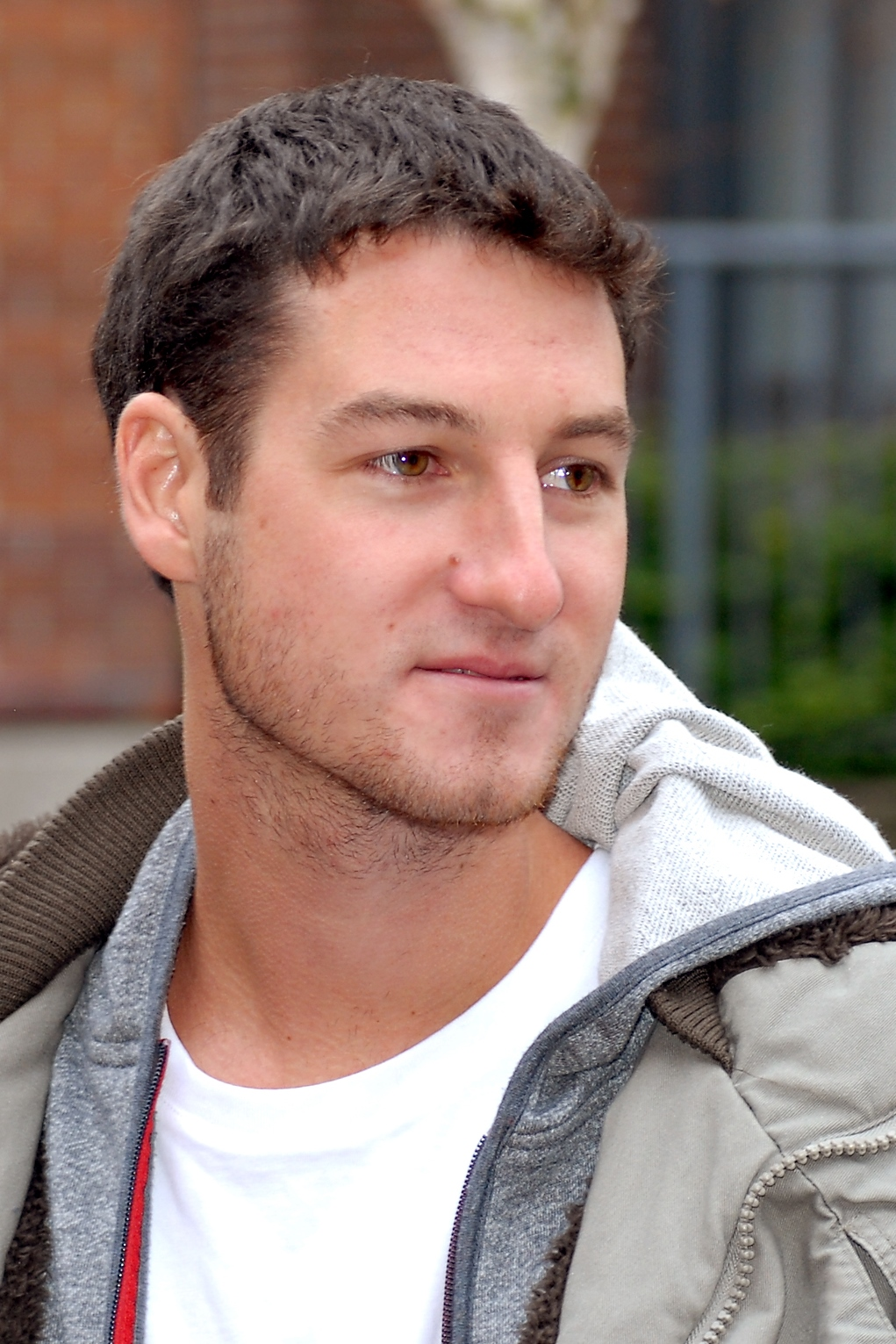
- Lupick in 2012
- Education: McGill University
- Occupations: Journalist, author
- Years active: 2006-present

Travis Lupick is a Canadian journalist and author. Lupick has worked as a staff reporter for The Georgia Straight and as a freelance reporter for the Toronto Star, and Al Jazeera English, among others.

Lupick is best known for his local reporting on the Downtown Eastside neighborhood of Vancouver and how the North American opioid epidemic has disproportionately affected the people who live there. The reporting has focused on initiatives led by community activists, such as naloxone distribution and unsanctioned overdose prevention sites, and often leads with the voices of people who use drugs.

== Education ==
Lupick graduated with a degree in political science from McGill University.

== Career ==
Lupick started working for the Georgia Straight in 2006.

In 2010, Lupick took a leave of absence from his job at the Georgia Straight and accepted a position with the Canadian nonprofit Journalists for Human Rights in Malawi and then Liberia. Lupick worked as a journalist in a number of countries, including Peru, Honduras, Bhutan, Nepal, Malawi, Liberia, and Sierra Leone. During this time, he freelanced for a variety of local and international publications, primarily writing for The Africa Report, Toronto Star, and Al Jazeera English. Some of his reporting included pieces on elections in Sierra Leone and the trial of Charles Taylor in Liberia.

Lupick returned to the Georgia Straight in 2013 to work as an editor and general assignment reporter. Topics of regular coverage included local politics, immigration issues, privacy and surveillance, and cannabis legalization. In 2014, he wrote a feature article for the Straight about the Vancouver Aquarium that sparked a public debate on cetacean captivity in the city. After much public pressure, the Vancouver Aquarium announced in 2018 that it would phase out its practice of keeping whales and dolphins on display.

Lupick started writing about the opioid epidemic for the Straight in 2014 as overdose deaths were starting to climb in Vancouver. As the number of deaths increased over the next 18 months, it became his full time beat.

== Publications ==
In 2017, Lupick published his first book, Fighting for Space: How a Group of Drug Users Transformed One City’s Struggle With Addiction. It recounts Vancouver's history with harm reduction, telling a story of grassroots drug user activism and the struggle for North America's first sanctioned supervised injection facility, Insite, which opened in 2003. Prominent space is given to the voices of Insite's founders, Liz Evans and Mark Townsend, and the cofounders of the Vancouver Area Network of Drug Users (VANDU), Bud Osborn and Ann Livingston.

In 2022, Lupick published his second book, Light Up the Night: America’s Overdose Crisis and the Drug Users Fighting for Survival. The book looks at the overdose crisis in the United States, which by 2022 was killing more than 100,000 people each year. The book explores the epidemic and looks at related topics, including harm reduction and the war on drugs, through the stories of two drug user activists, Jess Tilley of Massachusetts, president of the New England Users Union, and Louise Vincent of North Carolina. It recounts the formation and early years of America's first national drug user organization, the Urban Survivors Union.

== Awards and honors ==
In 2016, Lupick and Amanda Siebert received the Don McGillivray award from the Canadian Association of Journalists for the best overall investigative report of 2016. In 2017, he was awarded the Jack Webster Foundation award for excellence in journalism. In 2018, he won the George Ryga Award for Social Awareness in Literature.

In 2017, Lupick and Alexander Kim were awarded the Canadian Association of Journalists 2017 CAJ Award for their reporting on "Rising violence in Vancouver hospitals" featured on Cited Podcast. Lupick also won, with Sam Fenn and Alexander Kim, for the story “The Heroin Clinic” featured on Cited Podcast.

At the 2018 BC Book Prizes, Lupick was nominated for the Roderick Haig-Brown Regional Prize, which recognizes authors of books that contribute "to the enjoyment and understanding of British Columbia".

== Books ==
- Light Up the Night America's Overdose Crisis and the Drug Users Fighting for Survival (New Press, 2022)
- Fighting for Space How a Group of Drug Users Transformed One City's Struggle with Addiction (Arsenal Pulp Press, 2017)
