= Human trafficking in Nevada =

Human trafficking in Nevada is the illegal trade of human beings for the purposes of reproductive slavery, commercial sexual exploitation, and forced labor as it occurs in the state of Nevada, and it is widely recognized as a modern-day form of slavery. It includes "the recruitment, transportation, transfer, harboring or receipt of persons by means of threat or use of force or other forms of coercion, of abduction, of fraud, of deception, of the abuse of power, or of a position of vulnerability or of the giving or receiving of payments or benefits to achieve the consent of a person having control over another person, for the purpose of exploitation. Exploitation shall include, at a minimum, the exploitation of prostitution of others or other forms of sexual exploitation, forced labor services, slavery or practices similar to slavery, servitude or the removal of organs."

The National Human Trafficking Resource Center reported receiving 277 calls and emails in 2015 about human trafficking in Nevada.

== Contingency Account ==
By Nevada law, the State General Fund has contingency account for victims of human trafficking. Organizations must first apply to the Director of the Department of Health and Human Services to receive these funds. The Grants Management Advisory Committee then reviews the application and makes recommendations to the director. The director then makes the allocation and places conditions, such as requiring the organization to submit reports. The organization can only use the money for programs and services for victims of human trafficking. The Nevada Attorney General's Office, Soroptimist International of Reno, the Thelma B. and Thomas P. Hart Foundation and the Nevada Trucking Association have worked together to raise funds for the contingency account, holding the Refuge for the Rescued Benefit Dinner for Victims of Human Trafficking.

== Sex trafficking in Nevada ==
In 2013, Nevada passed Assembly Bill 67, which uses the federal definition of sex trafficking and increases penalties by one level. It makes victims eligible for state assistance and allows them to sue their traffickers. Sex traffickers will have to register as a sex offender, and their assets will be seized to pay for victim services.

=== Legal brothels ===
Prostitution of adults is legal in 11 rural counties in Nevada. By creating false identification, outside pimps can use these brothels to traffic "underage girls". In an article published in 1998, Detective Greg Harvey, who operated in Eugene, Oregon, said such cases were common, and stated "[i]t's happening right now, it's amazing how many girls are shipped from here to different brothels in northern and southern Nevada. Many are underage." Another detective, Sgt. Pete Kerns, supported Harvey's claims: "Never buy the line that nobody under 18 works in (Nevada brothels)," he said. "It's happening." However, "[n]o evidence shows brothel owners or managers are working with the Oregon pimps", according to Sgt. Bill Petty of the Storey County Sheriff's Department. Petty also claimed that "cases of underage prostitutes are rare in his county", while Storey County District Attorney Janet Hess "said only one case of an underage girl working at a brothel [had] reached her office in the last two years."

In her 2007 report, Prostitution and trafficking in Nevada: making the connections, clinical psychologist and anti-prostitution activist Melissa Farley presented the results of numerous interviews with brothel owners and prostitutes, claiming that most brothel prostitutes are controlled by outside pimps and that they suffer widespread abuse by brothel owners and customers. Bob Herbert supports the claim, stating: "Despite the fiction that they are "independent contractors," most so-called legal prostitutes have pimps — the state-sanctioned pimps who run the brothels and, in many cases, a second pimp who controls all other aspects of their lives (and takes the bulk of their legal earnings)."

Alexa Albert says that the trafficking is done in cooperation with brothel owners, so the prostitutes will be easier to control. Assemblyman Bob L. Beers said that "[a] brothel owner is somebody who, when it gets down to the very essence, is nothing more than a slave-owner." Former Nye County Commissioner Candice Trummell, director of the Nevada Coalition Against Sex Trafficking, said "[i]t is way past time for Nevada to be the last state in the United States of America to finally stand against all forms of slavery."

In 2009, an article in the Guardian stated that some brothels "impose some extraordinary restrictions on commercial sex workers" in order to "separate sex workers from the local community": some places forbid prostitutes to leave the brothels for extended periods of time, while other jurisdictions require the prostitutes to leave the county when they are not working; some places do not allow the children of the women who work in the brothels to live in the same area; some brothel workers are not permitted to leave the brothel after 5pm; in some counties registered sex workers are not allowed to have cars at all. Another former prostitute who worked in four Nevada brothels attacked the system, saying, "Under this system, prostitutes give up too much autonomy, control and choice over their work and lives" and "While the brothel owners love this profitable solution, it can be exploitative and is unnecessary". She described how the women were subject to various exaggerated restrictions, including making it very difficult for them to refuse clients and having to deal with doctors who had a "patronizing or sexist attitude" (the brothels discouraged and in many cases forbade prostitutes to see doctors of their own choosing).

=== Las Vegas ===
Although illegal, 90% of prostitution in Nevada occurs in Las Vegas. In 2009 Las Vegas was identified by the FBI as one of 14 cities in the U.S. with high rates of child prostitution. Las Vegas police claimed that "roughly 400 children are picked off the streets from prostitution each year." The U.S. Justice Department has also named Las Vegas among the 17 most likely destinations for human trafficking. The Christian anti-trafficking organization Shared Hope International says Las Vegas is a major hub for child sex trafficking, in part because of the hyper-sexualized entertainment industry, easy access to alcohol and drugs, and 24-hour gambling.

==== STOP program ====
In 1994, the Las Vegas Metropolitan Police Department developed a program called Stop Turning Out Child Prostitutes (STOP). It aims to identify and arrest child sex traffickers and provide an avenue for child prostitutes to live a successful life. It does this by using the following steps:

1. Arrest - The police arrest the victim. A team of detectives is then sent to investigate the victim in hopes to locate the trafficker.
2. Detention - The victim is detained through a material witness hold until after the trafficker has been prosecuted.
3. Maintenance and Protection - Investigators maintain frequent contact with the victim. They explain the process of the trial and discuss what the victim plans to do after the trial.
4. Court Appearance - The victim gives testimony at court and the hold is released
5. Aftercare - If a satisfactory home environment cannot be found, the city may use a program such as the Paul and Lisa program or Children of the Night.

No statistics were kept before the program, but the police department said that most children would return to prostitution shortly after their arrest. Since the program has been implemented, 9.6% of prostitutes were rearrested for prostitution. They also increased the arrests of traffickers to 380.

Shared Hope International said that the prosecution of traffickers is strong in Las Vegas, but criticized the city for arresting known victims of human trafficking, saying that victims of sex trafficking often get longer and more severe punishments than other youth arrested for misdemeanors. Family Court Judge William Voy agreed, saying "These kids don't really belong in juvenile justice but don't fit anywhere else in the system. They're out there being victimized but also committing a delinquent act, prostitution. There is no alternative but the detention center."

=== ATLAS program ===
In 2004, the Las Vegas Metropolitan Police Department and Salvation Army Family Services coordinated a coalition called the Anti-Trafficking League Against Slavery (ATLAS). It seeks to identify, rescue and restore victims of human trafficking and to prosecute traffickers in Nevada. It also involves the FBI, women's and family shelters and rape crisis programs, Nevada Child Seekers and the Boyd Law School at the University of Nevada, Las Vegas.

=== Nevada Sex Trafficking Awareness Campaign ===
The Nevada Sex Trafficking Awareness Campaign is a campaign to raise awareness of sex trafficking in Nevada. It started in 2013, when sex trafficking was officially defined in Nevada. In October 2013, it put up billboards advertising the National Human Trafficking Resource Center hotline. In January 2014, it aired the documentary "Trafficked No More", about sex trafficking in Nevada. It featured the disappearance of Jessie Foster, who went missing in Las Vegas. They have created handouts and pamphlets based on the documentary to distribute to schools.
