= New England Transit =

Roblox-based public transit roleplay and simulation group

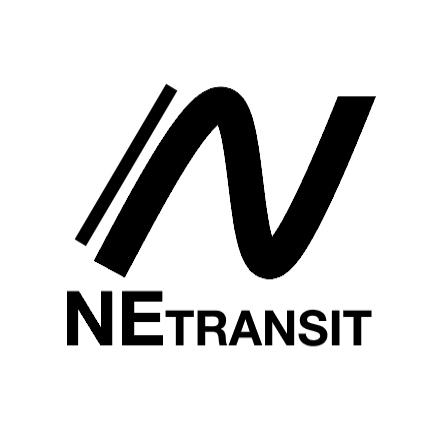
- Formerly: New England Transit Association
- Founded: November 25, 2021; 4 years ago
- Founder: Ilias Benmokrane
- Area served: Greater Boston; Worcester
- Products: Boston Bus Simulator; New England (Worcester) Bus Simulator
- Members: 30,000+ (2026)
- Website: www.netransit.net

New England Transit, commonly abbreviated as NETransit or NET, is a Roblox-based public transit roleplay and simulation group. Founded in 2021 by Ilias Benmokrane, known on Roblox as Ill91, the group developed Boston Bus Simulator as the successor to Benmokrane's first game, New England Bus Simulator.

New England Transit focuses on replicating the operations of public transportation agencies across Boston and Worcester. Boston Bus Simulator recreates bus operations at the Massachusetts Bay Transportation Authority (MBTA), while New England Bus Simulator replicates the Worcester Regional Transit Authority (WRTA).

The group's main game, Boston Bus Simulator, has experienced rapid growth, garnering over 1,100,000 visits in under a year. The project has been covered by several news outlets, including The Boston Globe, WHDH (Channel 7), WBZ-TV, and Axios.

== Development and Structures ==
New England Transit develops free-to-play, open world bus simulator games on Roblox. New England Transit is part of the broader Roblox public transit simulation community, where it maintains affiliations with other Roblox transit groups and participates in joint events and collaborations.

The group also participates in transit advocacy across Greater Boston, including conducting city-affiliated presentations demonstrating Boston Bus Simulator and equitable transit policy. Benmokrane has shared transit proposals, such as a fare-free pilot on bus routes outside of Boston, to organizations like the Boston Region Metropolitan Transit Organization.

Development for its two games is handled on the group level. New England Transit manages game assets, marketing, public relations and infrastructure design. Updates and feature rollouts are announced via the game page, the group’s official website, and its Discord server.

== Game Features ==
Across New England Transit's titles, gameplay centers on an in-game cash system, and dedicated gamepasses for exclusive content. In Boston Bus Simulator, players operate fixed MBTA bus routes, as they would in real life, crossing multiple cities near Boston. Currently, MBTA bus routes 104 (Airport Station to Malden Center), 105 (Sullivan Square to Malden Center), 106 (Wellington Station to Lebanon Loop), 110 (Wellington Station to Broadway and Park) and 112 (Wellington Station to Wood Island) are playable. Upon completing the route, a summary screen is shown with the players earnings. Cash is used to unlock certain bus "wraps" or exterior designs, being both fictional and modeled after the MBTA's current fleet. Certain unlockables, such as retired buses, are one-time Robux gamepass purchases.

In New England Bus Simulator, players can operate WRTA bus routes, though only in the city of Worcester and town of Auburn. Numbered routes all originate from Worcester's Central Hub bus station, which is across the street from the city's Union Station. Local shuttles, such as the Eldershopper, may omit in the Central Hub, serving a neighborhood Price Chopper, Shaws, and apartment complex. However, the game's lone fictional route (Polar Park Shuttle) was created to transport passengers between the Central Hub and Polar Park. Players can simulate 5 fixed routes, 7 (to Washington Heights via Family Health Center), 19 (to Goddard Drive via Webster Sq. Plaza), 25 (to Webster Sq. Plaza via Canterbury St.), 27 (to the Auburn Mall) and 80 (a loop around Downtown).

In both games, users may also choose to roleplay positions other than bus operator, including Transit Police (Boston Bus Simulator replicates the MBTA Transit Police agency) and passengers. The Transit Police mode allows user to moderate reckless drivers, create detours, and issue tickets to improperly parked vehicles across the map. Both games also stand out amongst Roblox bus and city simulators for its near 1:1 recreation of roads and buildings. Modeled primarily from Google Street View data, the video game developers then scale and map the city blocks into Roblox Studio.

As of January 2026, New England Transit operates a small portion of the MBTA's actual bus fleet, including the New Flyer Industries XDE40, D40LF, and C40LF buses. The American-made Gillig Advantage is also available in-game. For the WRTA's fleet, New England Bus Simulator operates a larger variety of vehicles, including Gillig Advantages but also NovaBus RTS buses, and Ford E350 minibuses.

== History ==
Benmokrane started developing on Roblox in May of 2019, motivated in part by his desire to improve the quality and accuracy of public transit simulator games on the platform. Medy Florestal, known as CallMeMedy, and Jarek Alexander assisted Benmokrane in developing the original map in 2019. The map initially recreated the Main South neighborhood in Worcester but later expanded to cover a larger area, stretching from Downtown Worcester to the Auburn Mall in the town of Auburn.

Benmokrane decided to sell the WRTA group in 2021. New England Bus Simulator subsequently became unavailable to play that same year. Despite parting ways with the group, Benmokrane began development on a new project based around Boston. He then created Chelsea/SL3 Bus Simulator, which would later become Boston Bus Simulator. It would grow to cover seven cities: Everett, Boston, Medford, Malden, Chelsea, Revere, and Somerville.

New England Bus Simulator was updated and reopened in November 2024, where it soon garnered over 31,000 total plays. Benmokrane retained the title despite the sale, operating the game from his personal Roblox account. Following continued development of the Boston-based network, the New England Transit group was established to manage both games, succeeding the WRTA group. The first Boston-area map, titled Lower Mystic Bus Division, was released on June 29, 2025. MBTA operations use the centralized hub system (Boston Bus Simulator), allowing players to select and join different regional maps.

According to WHDH (Channel 7), a Downtown Boston division is expected sometime in the near future, while group developers have announced that their older game, New England Bus Simulator, is set to receive a graphical update in late 2025.

== Reception ==
New England Transit and its games have been featured in various Boston and Worcester area publications. The Boston Globe described Boston Bus Simulator as a "hyperrealistic MBTA bus simulator" created by Boston area high school students, referring to its accurate simulation of bus routes and stations. WHDH (Channel 7) featured the game's rapid popularity, reporting that it received over 500,000 visits within less than two months.

WBZ-TV wrote about the project as well, noting its appeal to students and its groundbreaking simulation of Boston's public transit system. During the interview, Benmokrane shares that his work encouraged a user in the group's Discord server to pursue a career in public transportation. Axios Boston said the game is an unusual but notable inclusion in the city's digital landscape, citing its role in placing transit simulation on a mainstream stage.

Boston University's student newspaper, The Daily Free Press, describes how the group, "engages in public transit advocacy", as its founders envision creating, "a platform for transit-minded people to think about civic engagement." The City of Everett's senior transportation planner, Eric Molinari, explains how the group's games get, "'people involved in advocacy in the transit space'".

Worcester's Telegram and Gazette newspaper calls New England Bus Simulator a 1:1 recreation of Worcester, notably sharing how Benmokrane would often have to redo parts of the game's map in accordance with ongoing city projects. For example, when Polar Park and the Canal District were redeveloped, Benmokrane traveled to Worcester to document the changes and update the game.

Benmokrane has also met with Massachusetts lawmakers, including State Senator Sal DiDomenico who called the game, "incredible", and noting how the game influences advancing transit equity. State Senator Brendan Crighton, who serves as the chairperson of the transportation committee, was "impressed by the transit policy conversations inspired by the game." State Senator Patricia Jehlen was excited that the simulator, "helps encourage young people to make the most of the bus routes and feel confident in using the buses on their own." As of March 2026, the Malden Gaming District, a local group affiliated with the City of Malden, promotes Boston Bus Simulator on their website.
