= Jordan Abel =

Canadian Nisga'a poet

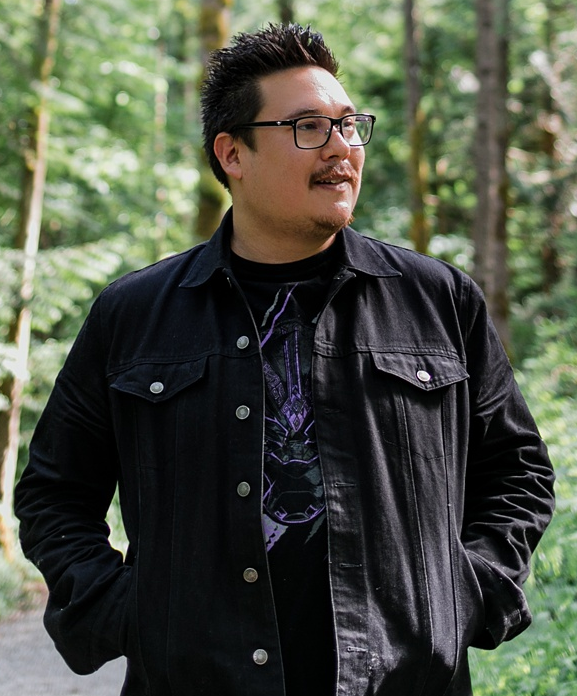
- Abel in 2019
- Born: British Columbia, Canada
- Education: University of Alberta; University of British Columbia; Simon Fraser University
- Occupations: Academic, poet
- Writing career
- Period: 2010s-present

Jordan Abel is a Nisga'a academic and poet who lives and works in Edmonton, Alberta, Canada. He is an associate professor in the Faculty of Arts at the University of Alberta.

== Early life and education ==
Abel was born Vancouver, British Columbia to a Nisga'a father and white mother. He grew up in Barrie, Ontario.

Abel studied English and creative writing at the University of Alberta, where he earned a bachelor's degree in 2008. He went on to earn a Master of Fine Arts from the University of British Columbia in 2012 and a doctorate in English from Simon Fraser University in 2019.

== Career ==
Abel's work addresses settler-colonialism directly, often through conceptual poetic approaches to overtly colonial texts (for example, Abel's books cut up, sample, and interrupt the Project Gutenberg archive of Western novels and Marius Barbeau's Totem Poles).

His first book of poetry, The Place of Scraps (Talonbooks), used as source text the work of 20th century ethnographer Marius Barbeau. The poems in Injun were based on 91 Western novels written during the past three centuries.

== Awards and honours ==
=== Recognition by work ===
==== The Place of Scraps ====
- 2014: Won the Dorothy Livesay Poetry Prize.
- 2014: Finalist for the Gerald Lampert Memorial Award.

==== Un/inhabited ====
- 2015: Named one of CBC Books' 75 best books of the year.

==== Injun ====
- 2017: Won the Canadian Griffin Poetry Prize.
- 2017: Shortlisted for the ReLit Award for poetry.

==== NISHGA ====
- 2021: Won the inaugural VMI Betsy Warland Between Genres Award.
- 2021: Finalist for the Hilary Weston Writers' Trust Prize for Nonfiction.
- 2022: Won the Hubert Evans Non-Fiction Prize.
- 2022: Finalist for the Roderick Haig-Brown Regional Prize.
- 2022: Finalist for the Wilfrid Eggleston Award for Nonfiction.
- 2022–23: Longlisted for First Nation Communities READ.

==== Empty Spaces ====
- 2024: Won the Governor General's Award for English-language fiction.
- 2024: Won the Mountain Fiction and Poetry award at the Banff Mountain Book Competition.
- 2024: Shortlisted for the Amazon Canada First Novel Award.
- 2024–25: Longlisted for First Nation Communities READ in the adult and young adult category.

=== Other honours ===
- 2015: CBC Books named Abel one of its 12 Young Writers to Watch.
- 2017: Held the Kuldip Gill Writing Fellowship as writer-in-residence at the University of the Fraser Valley.
- 2022: Elected to the Royal Society of Canada's College of New Scholars, Artists and Scientists.

== Work ==
=== Novels ===
- Empty Spaces (Penguin Random House, 2023)

=== Poetry ===
- The Place of Scraps (Talonbooks, 2013)
- Un/inhabited (Talonbooks, 2015)
- Injun (Talonbooks, 2016)
- Dad Era (Coach House Books, 2026)

=== Memoir ===
- NISHGA (Penguin Random House, 2020)
