= Benjamin Perrin =

Canadian lawyer and criminologist

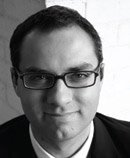
- Perrin in 2009
- Known for: Invisible Chains: Canada's Underground World of Human Trafficking
- Scientific career
- Fields: Criminal law Human trafficking
- Workplaces: Office of the Prime Minister; Peter A. Allard School of Law at the University of British Columbia
- Website: www.law.ubc.ca/faculty/Perrin/web/index.html

Benjamin Perrin is a law professor and former legal advisor to the Prime Minister's Office under Stephen Harper. Currently, he is a professor at the Peter A. Allard School of Law at the University of British Columbia. Perrin, who was a supporter that shaped Harper's tough on crime policies during his time as advisor, has now become a supporter of transformative justice.

== Career ==
=== Political career ===
He moved to Ottawa, Ontario in the late 1990s in order to become a policy intern for the Reform Party of Canada.

Perrin helped Joy Smith develop the National Action Plan to Combat Human Trafficking. In the 2009 Trafficking in Persons (TIP) Report by the United States Department of State's Office to Monitor and Combat Trafficking in Persons, he was the only Canadian named a TIP Hero. Perrin spoke at the news conference at the Vancouver American consulate during which the TIP report was released, and he called for Stephen Harper "to announce that he will enact a national action plan to combat human trafficking to follow up on the measures that his government has already taken." Perrin said that not having such a plan in place makes Canada look bad internationally and also prevents the issue of human trafficking from being adequately addressed. Perrin argued that, if the plan was to be effective, it needed to establish a strategy for preventing human trafficking, protecting victims, and prosecuting traffickers. He further said that the establishment of a national action plan on this issue "should be a priority for our federal government to end this atrocious crime that is flourishing in Canada."

He eventually was appointed "Special Adviser and Legal Counsel to the Prime Minister", and acted as a lead policy adviser in the PMO on subjects of relevance to the Department of Citizenship and Immigration, the Department of Justice, and Public Safety Canada.

Canada Senate Expenses Scandal

In 2013, Perrin was implicated in the Canadian Senate expenses scandal.

He was named in an "Information to Obtain" police request related to the scandal. In a letter to the RCMP's assistant commissioner Gilles Michaud, the PCO said it had informed the Prime Minister's Office that emails from Perrin, who allegedly helped broker a deal between Nigel Wright and Sen. Mike Duffy were not deleted, as had mistakenly been believed, following Perrin's abrupt departure from the PMO in March 2013. The PCO letter states the account was not deleted, as is standard practice, but in fact frozen due to unrelated litigation. On 30 July 2014, the Law Society of British Columbia announced that it closed its file related to Perrin's alleged role in the affair because the complaint was not valid. On 25 October 2014, the Law Society of Upper Canada also reported that after fully investigating, it had no concerns whatsoever with Perrin's conduct as a lawyer.

Perrin believes that Harper was self aware of the payoff to Duffy.

=== Academic career ===
In April 2013, Perrin left the Office of the Prime Minister and took up a position on the Faculty of Law at UBC.

In January 2020, Perrin took out an op-ed in Calgary Herald, explaining how evidence that he collected made him more supportive for supervised consumption sites. He later explained to Toronto Star columnist Susan Delacourt that he now opposes tough on crime policies. Perrin explain that his change of heart was primary driven by his Christian faith and his opposition to tough on crime policies had quiet support from some Conservative former MPs and advisers. In October 2023, Perrin, took out an op-ed in the Globe and Mail that explain why he believe tough on crime policies would not effectively tackle crime and gave some ideas on how transformative justice could.

== Books ==
Benjamin Perrin is the author of several books, including Invisible Chains: Canada's Underground World Of Human Trafficking (2010), Overdose: Heartbreak and Hope in Canada's Opioid Crisis (2020), and Indictment: The Criminal Justice System on Trial (2023).

His 2010 book Invisible Chains: Canada's Underground World of Human Trafficking. This book deals extensively with a gang of pimps called North Preston's Finest and includes an account of the disappearance of Jessie Foster. Perrin received a George Ryga Award for Social Awareness in Literature nomination for having written this book.

Overdose: Heartbreak and Hope in Canada's Opioid Crisis was shortlisted for the Jim Deva Prize for Writing that Provokes in 2021.

== Personal life ==
Perrin lives in Vancouver, British Columbia, Canada. He is of Christian faith.
