= Invisible Chains =

Book by Benjamin Perrin

Invisible Chains: Canada's Underground World of Human Trafficking
- Author: Benjamin Perrin
- Language: English
- Subject: Human trafficking in Canada
- Published: 2010
- Publication place: Canada
- Media type: Print
- ISBN: 0143178970

Invisible Chains: Canada's Underground World of Human Trafficking is a 2010 book about human trafficking by Benjamin Perrin. Perrin wrote the book after researching human trafficking for ten years. In Invisible Chains, Perrin recounts a variety of stories of human trafficking in Canada, including that of the prostitution of a child in Ontario whose sexual services were advertised in the adult services section of Craigslist. The book was timed to be published within three weeks of the release of Joy Smith's proposal for the National Action Plan to Combat Human Trafficking. Perrin advocated adopting Smith's proposal, saying that Invisible Chains "shows that while traffickers have a plan, Canada doesn't," and that the victims are the ones who suffer from the lack of a national action plan. Perrin promoted the book in Winnipeg, Manitoba in October 2010. Mark Milke of the Calgary Herald said that Perrin's book is "not an enjoyable read. It's depressing... but it's a necessary read," going on to say that Invisible Chains "will do much good." University of Manitoba professor Joan Durrant praised Invisible Chains, calling it a powerful book. Chester Brown condemned Invisible Chains, saying that it purports "that johns are evil monsters." In response, Brown wrote Paying for It, a graphic novel written "from the john's point of view, since of course, I don’t think of myself as an evil monster." Perrin's book was nominated for a George Ryga Award for Social Awareness in Literature, but lost to One Story, One Song, an essay collection by Richard Wagamese.
