= Jean Barman =

Historian

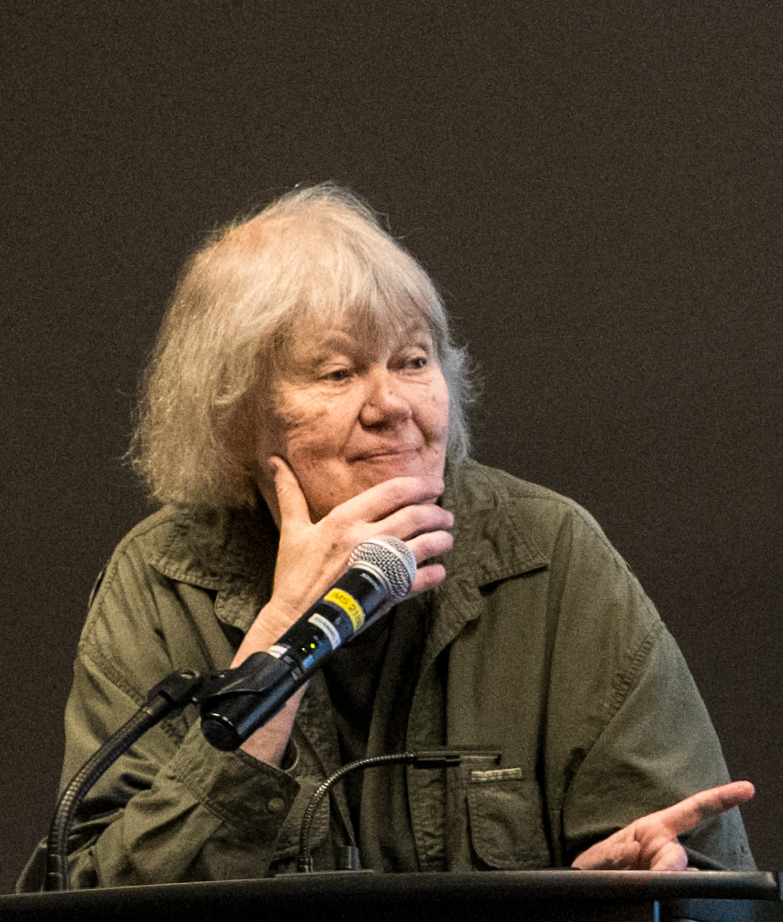
Jean Barman in 2020

Jean Barman is a Canadian scholar specializing in the study of British Columbia. Born in Stephen, Minnesota, United States, Barman arrived in British Columbia in 1971. Her work The West Beyond the West: A History of British Columbia has been described as the "standard text on the subject [of British Columbia history]." She has received the George Woodcock Award for Lifetime Achievement in British Columbia Literature, the Lieutenant Governor's Medal for historical writing, and the 2006 City of Vancouver Book Award (for Stanley Park's Secret). She is a professor emerita at the University of British Columbia, as is her husband, the historian of Brazil Roderick Barman.

== Education ==
- University of British Columbia, 1982, EdD, History of education
- University of California at Berkeley, 1970, MLS, Librarianship
- Harvard University, 1963, MA, Russian studies
- Macalester College, 1961, BA, International relations and history

== Publications ==
Select works:

- Growing up British in British Columbia : boys in private school, 1982
- Indian education in Canada, 1986
- The West beyond the West : a history of British Columbia, 1991
- Sojourning sisters : the lives and letters of Jessie and Annie McQueen, 2000
- Constance Lindsay Skinner : writing on the frontier, 2000
- The Remarkable Adventures of Portuguese Joe Silvey. 2004
- Stanley Park's Secret : The Forgotten Families, 2006
- Leaving paradise : indigenous Hawaiians in the Pacific Northwest, 1787-1898, 2006
- Abenaki daring : the life and writings of Noel Annance, 1792-1869, 2016
- British Columbia in the Balance : 1846-1871, 2022
