= Nonprofit Quarterly =

Magazine based in Boston, Massachusetts, US

- Editor in Chief: Cyndi Suarez
- Circulation: Daily newsletters, Premium and Complimentary webinars, and Quarterly Magazine. Occasional: Podcasts, roundtables, and forum events.
- Publisher: Joel Toner
- First issue: 1994; 32 years ago
- Company: Nonprofit Information Networking Association (501(c)3))
- Country: United States
- Based in: Boston, Massachusetts
- Language: English
- Website: nonprofitquarterly.org
- ISSN: 1084-8371

Nonprofit Quarterly, also known as NPQ, is a quarterly publication of current information on non-profit organizations and social justice. Today it also regularly publishes written, video, and audio content online. NPQ curates conversations among civic actors that build shared understanding around core themes of racial justice, economic justice, climate justice, health justice, and leadership. By deepening field knowledge, NPQ aims to advance the theory and practice of multiracial democracy.

The Quarterly was originally founded, published and edited by David Garvey in 1994, as the New England Nonprofit Quarterly. The publication was a regional learning magazine for New England nonprofit practitioners. The Nonprofit Quarterly launched as a national print journal in the winter of 1999, and now also publishes daily content online. The current editor-in-chief of NPQ is Cynthia Suarez, who assumed the role as of January 1, 2021, taking the role from the former Editor-in-Chief, Ruth McCambridge.

The Nonprofit Quarterly magazine was incubated by Third Sector New England until 2006, "when it spun off as an independent publication."

In 2019, Nonprofit Quarterly became home to the online archives of the Grassroots Fundraising Journal.

Nonprofit Quarterly is a member of the Institute for Nonprofit News along with other nonprofit journalism outlets.
