= Rolf Knight =

Canadian historian and author (1936–2019)

Rolf Knight (1936–2019) was a Canadian historian, author of working class and regional history of British Columbia.

Knight received his Bachelor's and Master's degrees from the University of British Columbia, and gained his Ph.D. from Columbia University in 1968. He taught at Simon Fraser University and the University of Toronto. In 1977, he left Simon Fraser University, though continued to research and write about working class history while working as a taxi driver in Vancouver.

Knight received multiple awards for his work regarding the regional history and working class history of British Columbia, including the George Woodcock Lifetime Achievement Award for BC Literature.

== Early life and education ==
Knight was born March 4, 1936, in a logging camp in British Columbia. His mother, Phyllis, was born in Germany, and his father was a cook in the camp.

Knight attended the University of British Columbia, where he received a Bachelor of Arts (1959) and Master of Arts (1962) in anthropology. He received his Doctor of Philosophy from Columbia University in 1968.

== Career ==
Knight taught at the University of Toronto and Simon Fraser University. While teaching, he worked with his mother to write her biography, A Very Ordinary Life, which in part, discussed her work as a gold panner in Germany. The book was published in 1974, and his mother died later the same year. In 1977, Knight left the university to drive a taxi in Vancouver. The following year, he published Indians at Work. He published several other books over the next few decades, including a co-written biography of Homer Stevens, Homer Stevens: A Life in Fishing, which was published in 1992. The book received an award from the British Columbia Historical Federation. The same year, the Canadian Historical Association honored Knight with a Certificate of Merit for his work focusing on the history of British Columbia.

== Personal life ==
Knight died June 22, 2019.

== Publications ==
- Knight, Rolf (1972). Sugar Plantations and Labor Patterns in the Cauca Valley, Colombia/Rolf Knight. University of Toronto, Department of Anthropology.
- Knight, Phyllis; Knight, Rolf (1974). A Very Ordinary Life. Vancouver, BC: New Star Books. ISBN 978-0-919888-01-2.
- Knight, Rolf (1975). Work Camps and Company Towns in Canada and the U.S.: An Annotated Bibliography. Vancouver, BC: New Star Books. ISBN 978-0-919888-60-9.
- Knight, Rolf; Koizumi, Maya (1976). A Man of Our Times: The Life-history of a Japanese-Canadian Fisherman. Vancouver, BC: New Star Books. ISBN 978-0-919888-64-7.
- Knight, Rolf; Arntzen, Arnt; Koeppen, Ebe (1977). Stump Ranch Chronicles and Other Narratives. Vancouver, BC: New Star Books. ISBN 978-0-919888-74-6.
- Knight, Rolf (1978). Indians at Work: An Informal History of Native Indian Labour in British Columbia, 1858-1930. Vancouver, BC: New Star Books. ISBN 978-0-919888-78-4.
- Knight, Rolf (2011). Along the No. 20 Line: Reminiscences of the Vancouver Waterfront. Vancouver, BC: New Star Books. ISBN 978-1-55420-061-0.
- Knight, Rolf (1983). Traces of Magma: An Annotated Bibliography of Left Literature. Vancouver, BC: Draegerman. ISBN 978-0-86491-034-9.
- Knight, Rolf (2013-05-09). Voyage Through the Past Century. Vancouver, BC: New Star Books. ISBN 978-1-55420-068-9.
- Stevens, Homer; Knight, Rolf (1992). Homer Stevens: A Life in Fishing. Madeira Park, BC: Harbour Publishing. ISBN 978-1-55017-070-2.

== See also ==
- United Fishermen and Allied Workers' Union
- History of the Coast Salish peoples
- Indigenous peoples of North America
