= History of the Coast Salish peoples =

Current distribution area of the Salish languages

Distribution area of the Coast Salish languages

The History of the Coast Salish, a group of Native American ethnicities on the Pacific coast of North America bound by a common culture, kinship, and languages, dates back several millennia. Their artifacts show great uniformity early on, with a discernible continuity that in some places stretches back more than seven millennia.

In the area of today's Coastal Salish, for example in the broad coastal border of the Canadian province of British Columbia and the US states of Washington and Oregon, traces of human presence go back over ten thousand years.

The livelihood was provided by fishing, especially salmon, as well as hunting and gathering activities. Recent research shows that some groups lived as early as the 2nd millennium BC. to a rural way of life with seasonally inhabited villages.

Already the first contacts with Europeans around 1775 decimated numerous groups to a great extent by imported diseases, above all by smallpox. Since the colonial powers Great Britain and Spain agreed in 1790 not to have trading posts, the construction of forts did not begin on the Pacific coast accessible by ship, but first on the Columbia and further inland and only reached Vancouver Island more than 50 years later. Thus, the canoe as a means of transport and the trade routes laid out by the coastal inhabitants, such as the Grease trails, gained great importance for the initially most important trade in otter and beaver pelts. In return, the Indians received metal goods and weapons, which greatly changed the local hierarchies and the balance of power between the tribes.

While the northern portion of the Salish-inhabited territory fell to the British Hudson's Bay Company, the southern portion fell to the USA in 1846. These displaced the Indigenous Peoples to a much greater extent through settlement and forced them into reservations by military force. While in British Columbia each group that was considered a "tribe" received its own, albeit mostly very small, Indian reserve, the USA set up larger "reservations" in which several tribes lived. Both states attempted to forcibly assimilate the Indigenous Peoples, with the US relying far more heavily on interbreeding, land privatization, and economic pressure. What they had in common was the attempt to wipe out the Indigenous cultures through bans and a corresponding school system. In the meantime, many Indigenous communities have succeeded in reviving their cultural heritage and enforcing self-government.

== Introductory Overview ==
The early history of the Coast Salish people primarily relies on archaeological evidence, as written sources emerge only with the European exploration and subsequent claims in the late 18th century. In addition to these sources, the Coast Salish history is enriched by oral traditions and research on culturally modified trees, which provide valuable insights into their ancestral practices and methods of processing resources. These trees bear traces of human modification, signifying their cultural significance within the Coast Salish communities.

The semi-nomadic Salish on the coast lived mainly from salmon. At the latest from 1600 BC A rural way of life developed with a corresponding transformation of the landscape. There were also large villages that were sometimes inhabited in winter for centuries. Societies differentiated into a dominant nobility, the general population, and enslaved people, who were mostly prisoners of war and their descendants. In addition, there were enslaved people as objects of trade and the exchange in the form of ritual gifts within the leading groups. Similar to membership in the nobility, the rank of chief was mostly hereditary in certain families, but could be revoked.

The extremely rainy region produced temperate rainforests, which not only provided the material for the totem poles, which could reach over 50 m high, but also for the houses (early plank houses), but also for food, clothing and blankets. Metal, on the other hand, was extremely rare.

The seaworthy canoes permitted warfare along the coasts, but also extensive trade. The fur merchants and explorers coming from Europe also used the trade routes and well-known waterways. However, they also brought in unknown diseases that wiped out numerous tribes, for the Salish were decimated by smallpox as early as 1775 onwards. In addition, there was a particularly warlike phase, characterized by plundering raids by the northern coastal peoples, which were intensified by European weapons technology.

In 1846, the USA and Great Britain divided the vast Oregon Country along the 49th parallel, severing traditional territories, kinship and trade ties. The onset of settlement led to battles, especially in Washington, such as the Puget Sound Wars. The establishment of Indian reserves in Canada resulted in extreme dispersal of settlements, while in the United States, several tribes were often grouped together, creating new associations known as "tribes".

While the Salish were initially able to play an important economic role in British Columbia before they were pushed out of most industries by legislation, in the USA they were often relegated to comparatively inhospitable regions. The two states also pursued different strategies of forced assimilation. These began in both states with proselytizing - against which their own spiritual forms developed as a reaction - led to bans on the most important cultural expressions, excluded all native inhabitants from the right to vote and escalated to the point of the forced removal of Indigenous children to residential schools for which the Canadian government apologized in 2008. During this phase the population collapsed, most languages were lost and migration to the cities increased so much that the vast majority of the Coast Salish now live there.

The situation only changed with the changed legal situation, which the tribal representatives were able to enforce before the highest courts. Thanks to more open borders and the increasing prosperity of some tribes, but above all the growing awareness of the common cultural values, there was a partial revival of the community of the Salish groups. Many groups are still fighting for tribal recognition as a prerequisite to even entering into negotiations for their sovereignty and land. Tribal associations are pooling their efforts, borders are being marked and sovereignty rights are being successively granted.

While attempts were made in the USA for several decades to break up tribal lands into parcels and privatize them, the majority of Canadian reserves remained tribal property. British Columbia has been trying to implement this privatization in exchange for enlarged reserves since 1993 (BC Treaty Process), but only a few contracts have been concluded so far. Since 2007 it has been unclear whether this so-called BC Treaty Process can and should be continued.

== Early history ==
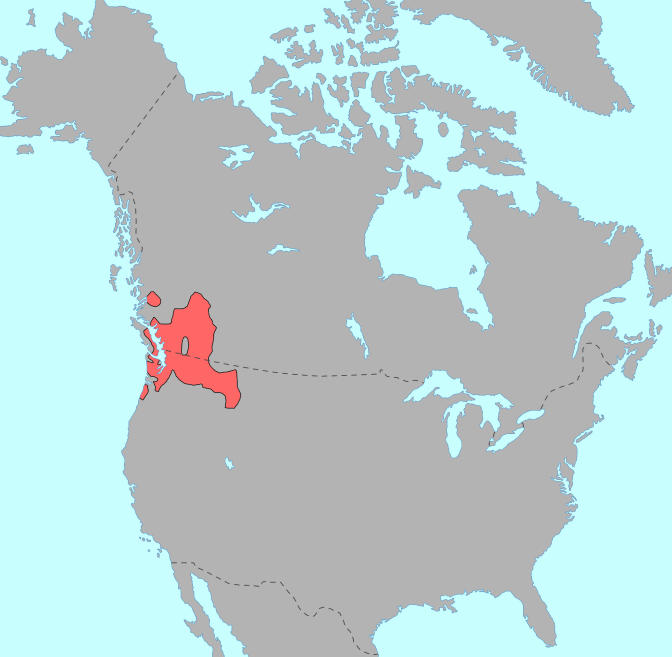
Distribution of the Salish languages

The early history of the Coastal Salish and their predecessor cultures can only be grasped archaeologically and later by oral tradition. Approximately 400 construction permits are issued annually for around 23,000 archaeological sites in British Columbia. This often leads to conflicts, because the majority of the sources on Salish history are - often not easily recognizable - underground or in shell mounds (shell middens), some of which are several meters high. It was not until 1995 that a First Nation in British Columbia, the Nanoose, was able to gain a say in the management of archaeological sites. Despite research that was initially hardly funded, the results of the last few decades are remarkable. The situation is similar in Washington. In 2003, an archaeological report stated that there were 14,000 archaeological sites ranging from entire villages to trees that have been modified for cultural reasons (Culturally Modified Trees).

In the early phase of human settlement, the landscape was still undergoing major changes. Glaciers, meltwater, swaying coastlines, a significantly lower sea level, tsunamis shaped this phase, and there were also uplifts and lowerings of the coastlines, which were triggered by the melting of the huge ice masses. With that, many artifacts should be gone for good. This probably explains, at least in part, why there are hardly any artifacts from before about 8000 BC, except in places that have never been flooded. Artifacts dating back to the 9th millennium BC were found on Dundas Island, at Far West Point. One of the oldest sites in British Columbia was found near Namu. The region was settled between 8000 and 3000 BC. It was inhabited by semi-sedentary and sedentary groups who processed coarse-grained effusion rock into tools. Recent studies suggest the use of watercraft.

Traditionally, the Coast Salish have asserted that they have always lived where they live today. Creation stories are widespread, often of animals in human form, of creators or ancestors of today's tribes or Nations. In addition, there is the idea of a (transformer) who created the landscapes, the animal and plant inhabitants, the foundations of the social order. Often they contain memories of the immigration period and of a great flood.

=== From the Milliken phase (ca. 7500 BC) ===
The Stó:lō also assert that they have always lived where they are today.

In addition, from about 500 B.C. post houses became characteristic of the west coast culture. Presumably the rainforest, which had been favored for a long time, now produced sufficiently large trees, and woodworking had advanced enough to work the giant trees. From 1000 AD at the latest, care was often taken not to kill the giant trees if possible. The processing of stone sculptures can also be proven for the first time from this time; fifty of these cultural belongings alone are now in the Royal British Columbia Museum.

On the south coast there is evidence of lip piercings from circa 500 AD, but then disappeared. In contrast, the northern coastal areas still have piercings as part of their traditions today. A type of ear coil from about 500 BC also survived. Soapstone objects of unclear use (sometimes called "whatzits") can possibly also be classified within this phase. Strings of beads and rings made during this period with copper from Alaska have been found. Such finds point to a far-reaching system of trade contacts, whose goods may have served to satisfy special representational needs, which are probably connected with the emergence of a class of nobility.

The Skarnel Phase (350 BC to 250 AD) is notable for the disappearance of the microliths. Sites from this period include Esilao, Katz, Pipeline and Silverhope Creek.

In the Emery Phase (250-1250 AD) pipes appeared, probably around 500 AD. However, tobacco was only smoked on the south coast, whereas in the north it was chewed. Northern cultures also grew tobacco in gardens. At the same time, hand spindles and other objects related to blanket-making appear. These blankets were probably made from the hair of dogs and mountain goat. The former were mainly kept on the Gulf Islands like sheep in Europe.

The Esilao Phase (1250–1800 AD) is characterized by small projectile tips of certain types of fortifications. The huge mussel heaps provide numerous clues to the society behind them. They consist not only of shells, but also of ashes, rocks shattered by the heat of a fire, animal bones and refuse. From about 1500 AD a more food-storing society seems to have developed, depending primarily on salmon.

At the lower Skeena River, in the Kitselas Canyon, several phases can be distinguished, including the Gitaus Phase from about 1300 and 600 BC. In Gitaus and at the Paul Mason Site there were summer fishing camps. The Skeena Phase (1600–1200 BC), which can only be verified in Gitaus, shows molded, single-edged and lance-shaped bifaces, a type of double-edged hand axe. Flint was of paramount importance.

In the delta of the Fraser River the most important localities are St. Mungo, Glenrose, and Crescent Beach. Mussels were clearly important here, and fish (especially salmon and the starry flounder (Platichthys stellatus), a species of flatfish found on almost all coasts of the North Pacific. was likely more important than game or marine mammals However, game and seals were also important food sources.

=== Marpole culture (400 BC to 400 AD) ===
The Coast Salish of today can be traced back to the Marpole culture. It was already characterized by the same social differentiation, plank houses housing multiple families, salmon fishing and conservation, rich carvings of often monumental proportions, and complex ceremonies.

Because of the paramount importance of salmon fishing, an immigration from the lower Fraser Valley or the Plateaus was long assumed, but Marpole culture appears to be regionally based. This culture is named for a site in present-day Vancouver that was then on the coast, but which has now been shifted further west by Fraser deposits. The village, situated on a shell mound, was several hectares in size, the mound 3 to 4 m high. A peak of complexity was reached on the South Coast. Permanent winter settlements can be proven, from around 1 AD there were also plank houses or long houses. The burial sites show strong status differences.

Barbed harpoons replaced the various types of articulated harpoons. The number of ornamental works clearly increased, such as stone figures. An important site for the Marpole culture is Beach Grove, a winter village in the Fraser Valley. There are various depressions of houses that are large but not yet precisely measured. The children's graves are remarkably richly furnished, e.g. T. with Dentalia, i.e. shells, and above all with the copper, which was extremely rare and valuable at the time.

Around 400 BC A society developed that favored the individual acquisition of prestige. Between about 500 and 1000 AD many South Salish groups are identified by cairn graves (cairns). There are hundreds of them around Victoria and Metchosin. At that time, a rank or prestige society probably still prevailed. It was not until around 1000 that an elite monopolized not only inherited and ascribed prestige, but also means of power and resources.

== Societies around 1800 ==
=== Traditional livelihoods, hunter-gatherers, farmers ===
As was the case throughout the Pacific coast, the Salish tribes subsisted extensively on marine animals. The salmon, which swam up the rivers every year to spawn, played a prominent role. Other fish such as Herring and Halibut, but also birds and game were on the menu. However, not everyone was allowed to hunt everywhere, because certain families had their reef nets and certain gathering areas, such as that of the horse clam, a species of mollusk (Tresus nuttallii). They were reserved for the "nobility". Similar rules applied to building houses and hunting, but also to collecting numerous plants, such as berries, grasses, etc. It could happen that family clans migrated to certain areas that "belonged" to them, depending on the best time to harvest the plants – Year for year.

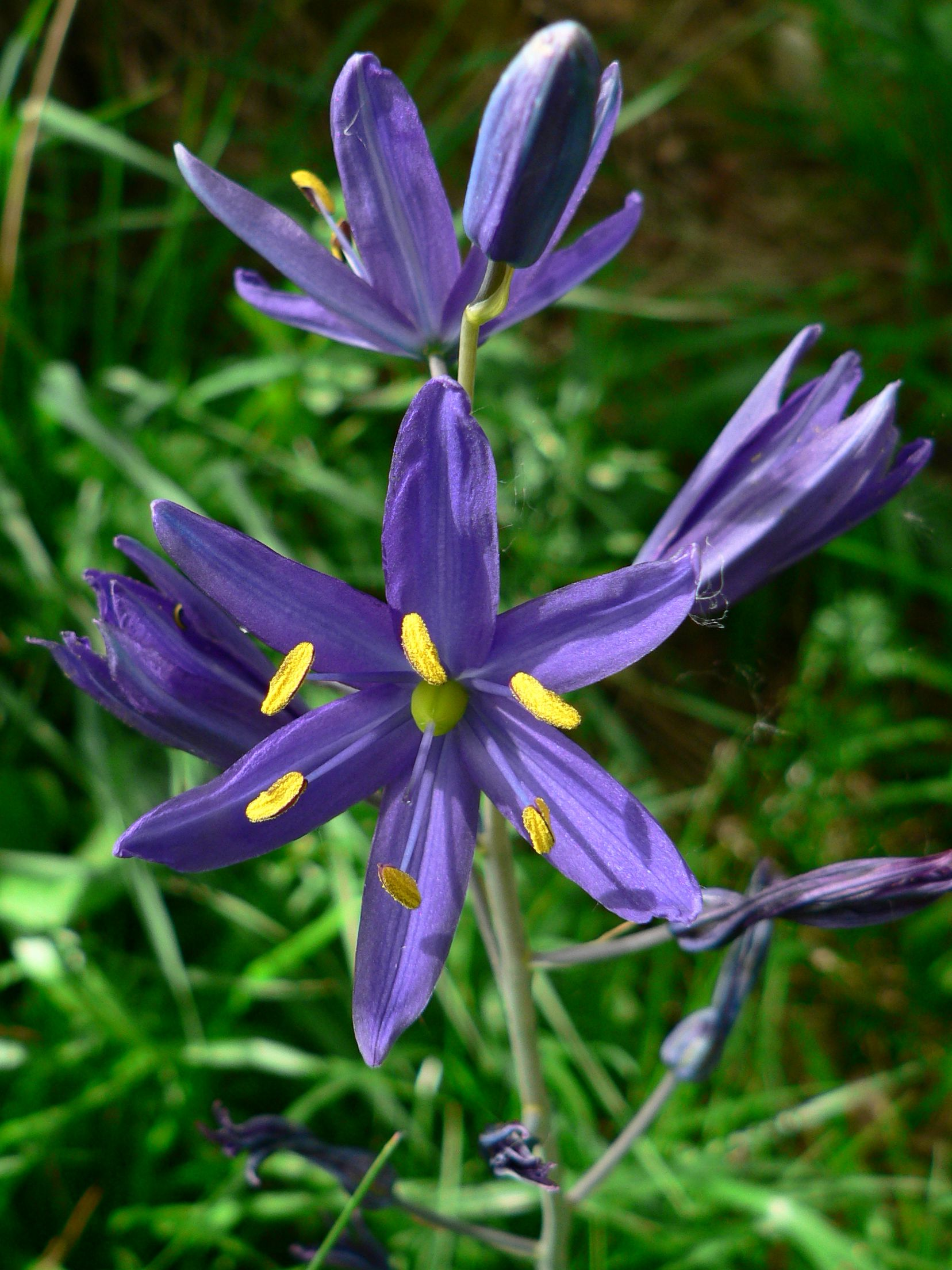
Camassia quamash whose bulbs are edible

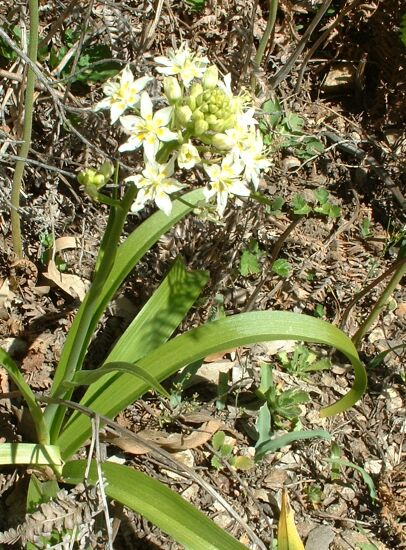
The highly poisonous (hence the name Deathcamas), best on the Blossom distinguishable Zigadenus

It has long been known that the Salish were not only hunter-gatherers, but also farmers tied to a specific area, who undertook migrations according to the cycles of nature. For example, they planted camas, a bulbous tuber from the asparagus family with blue flowers. Their onions taste like very sweet baked tomatoes, some like pears. The Salish used two species, namely the Common Camas(Camassia quamash, also called Indian Camas) and the Large Camas (Camassia leichtlinii) . Cultivation and care of the soil transformed the landscape over the centuries and gave it a park-like character. At the same time, the harvest was a good opportunity to make social contacts in the camps on the fields and to strengthen society through rituals.

The sparsely treed zones, which were equally necessary for the cultivation of camas and for the potatoes already adopted around 1800, were created through the targeted use of fire. Of particular importance was the Garry Oak (Quercus garryana), a species of oak. It is distributed between British Columbia and California but grows best around Victoria. Around 1800, this system covered around 15 km² in the area of today's city.

Seasonal migrations shaped the course of the year. They hibernated along the rivers, and larger groups then got together. The most important ceremonies and celebrations took place from October/November to February/March. In spring we went fishing to replenish the depleted supplies. The fish was air-dried, smoked, eaten fresh, but never salted. Dried fish was also an important commodity. Equally important food sources were roots, shoots and berries.

During the summer, wood was still collected, but now wood was also cut, from which not only house poles and planks, canoes, totem poles, weapons and tools were made, but also headgear and clothing. In addition, a white-haired dog breed provided the material for blankets, which Simon Fraser met in 1808. At the same time there were the so-called camp dogs who, Coyoten similar, who guarded villages and camps. In July and August, when the salmon were migrating upstream, fishing was again the priority. In the late summer they finally went back to the mountains.

The basis of this hike was a kind of spiritual calendar, the system of the thirteen moons. It formed the time frame in which economic activities such as catching, searching, and harvesting were combined with ceremonial and educational aspects. With this, places of residence, ceremonies, the right moments for teaching were assigned to each lunar month.

Hence, to limit disputes, the tribes claimed a traditional territory that ensured their survival on their annual circular migrations. So these areas are dozens of smaller settlement chambers for a temporarily nomadic life. In bad years long-distance trade, using the coasts as routes for large trading canoes, could save lives. In the opposite direction, camas, later tomaton or potaton, could be exported to climatically unsuitable areas. The advantage of this way of life was that there were hardly any crop failures, and even if the crops failed in unfavorable years, one could switch to the sea. However, in order to secure access to such areas, the principle of family lineage came into play, which means that certain areas or devices, such as pots, could only be used along a line of family relationships. Consequently, the number of Coastal Salish was extremely large, although it cannot be precisely estimated. The explorers Meriwether Lewis and William Clark stated in 1805 that the number of inhabitants was not less than "in any part of the United States".

Other fruits were also grown and transformed the landscape, but until very recently this was not recognized as a product of the peasant way of life. This is how the Cowichan brought Wapato roots to the Gulf Islands, i.e. Arrowwort. There were also large fields of wapato along the Columbia River. The wapatos, according to Clark on November 22, 1805, taste like Irish potatoes and they are a viable substitute for bread. The Kwagewlth maintained stone walled gardens of Pacific Silverweed (Potentilla pacifica) and cloverfields at the mouth of the Nimpkish River. The Sto:lo regularly burned down terrain to make berries grow better. Other tilled soil for growing Cranberries, Gooseberries, Rubus spectabilis, Rubus parviflorus (Thimbleberry), Wild Onions, Strawberries, Cow Parsnip (Heracleum maximum, too known as Indian Celery or Pushki), carrots, so-called crab apples, blueberries, black currants, etc., with the boundaries between farming methods, gardening and simply keeping the area free for certain plants, e.g. by fire, or protection of a suitable area by stone walls.

George Vancouver, who had seen extensive camas fields on southern Vancouver Island and at Puget Sound, nevertheless reported: "I could not believe that any uncultivated land was ever discovered that such a gave a rich picture." The fact that the population was quite thin, because smallpox had claimed so many lives shortly before, probably contributed to this impression. Around 1913/1916 the McKenna-McBride-Commission still clung to the prejudice that only uncultivated land could be Indian land, and in many places refused to add garden land to the reservations.

=== Societies and hierarchies ===
Around 1800 the social hierarchy of the coast Salish was clearly more pronounced than in the hinterland. In doing so, it in turn became more rigid from south to north. In addition to the leadership group, which had the resources, there were the simple tribesmen and enslaved people. Nothing escaped the concept of ownership. Thus, not only objects, houses and people could be property, but also fishing places for salmon, as generally places, rituals and ceremonies, songs and stories, which by all means not everyone was allowed to know. War was therefore above all a means of acquiring wealth, for example in the form of enslaved people, who created and maintained the means of living for the upper class. Nevertheless, they lived under the same roof with their owners. In addition, they were able to acquire spiritual power.

Sometimes large settlements existed with more than a thousand inhabitants. The houses were usually inhabited by several families, which had a common, but divided household. These houses were decorated with symbols, such as totem poles and painted house walls. Equally famous are the masks of the coastal peoples. Often the lineages traced themselves back to a common ancestor, who in turn appears in the ritual objects. Society was thus organized according to this particular type of family, not primarily by tribe. Thus, kinship relations determined the family-bound dialect, but also who worked together, who shared resources. This kinship extended far beyond the local house group and village into other communities. The village, on the other hand, played a role in certain types of ceremonies.

However, while Tlingit, Haida, and Tsimshian are described as matrilineal, among the Wakashan and Salish, two-line kinship prevailed through father and mother alike. Heredity did not prevail among the coastal Salish. Among all Salish, the levirate (a male member of the deceased man's family marries his widow) and the sororate (a female member marries the corresponding widower) was common to secure relations between groups related by marriage. Kinship relationships were always bipartite, and marrying blood relatives was subject to prohibitions. These extensive kinships were extremely important. Local relationships also existed in the family, the household, the local group, and the winter village. The extended family remains an important emotional and economic base to this day. Family solidarity is still the basis of political life.

The chiefs of the tribes were mostly men, but women were often the heads of their households. Leadership depended on the ability to acquire and properly exercise spiritual power and on personal ability. There was no formal, super-personal authority. Related to this is the concept of the redistribution of property which was conducted primarily through the potlatch. Therefore, the governmental prohibitions valid until 1934 (USA) and 1951 (Canada) were an attack on one of the supporting pillars of the Indigenous cultures.

=== Trade ===
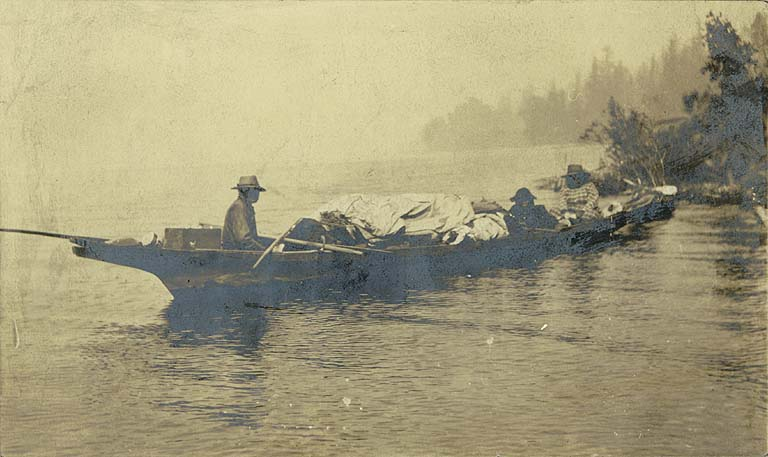
Canoeists on Lake Union near Seattle, ca. 1885. This traditional type of boat was later supplanted by that of the Nuu-chah-nulth

Trade played a role not consistently comparable to European trade. The voyages served for the exchange of goods, but also for the establishment and consolidation of kinship relations, which one could fall back on, even after a longer period of dormancy. Thus, the coastal Salish had places to stay practically everywhere in the vast residential area, which in turn facilitated trade. However, this knowledge was "private" and belonged to only one family at a time. The lower class was much more restricted regionally and possessed no such knowledge.

With camas bulbs, which were 4–8 cm in diameter and could weigh over 100 g, there was an intensive trade, especially with the Nuu-chah-nulth, because the majority of the coveted fruit grew in the less humid and warmer south of Vancouver Island. Even before white settlers arrived, Indigenous Peoples grew tomatoes and potatoes, which they probably obtained from the first forts of the Hudson's Bay Company. Beans were also occasionally planted, but they were apparently not a trade commodity.

Other important trade goods were otter and beaver pelts, fish oil and fat (especially the buttery fat of the candlefish), but also timber for the plank houses and for the forts of the fur trading companies. In addition, there were blankets, some of which were made from the hair of goats, around the Juan de Fuca Strait also often from the specially kept dogs. Dogs were probably kept like flocks of sheep and provided white and dark fibers for blankets, mats, baskets, and clothing that were widely traded. With the severance of numerous trade contacts, blankets became an important commodity soon traded by the Hudson's Bay Company. They were also offered as barter for abandoned land when reservations were established.

The raiding and pillaging campaigns of the tribes living north of the Salish, especially the Haida, Kwakwaka'wakw, and Tlingit, which were intensified by the first fur traders and the steady influx of arms, may have done considerable damage to the trade in some years. What economic changes the looted people led to among the northern tribes seems to have been little explored.

== Europeans and Americans ==
=== First contacts and mass deaths ===
The first contacts with Europeans occurred among the southernmost Salish tribes. Here, two Spanish ships appeared in 1775, at least one of which, the Santiago led by Bruno de Hezeta, probably introduced smallpox to the Quinault. This catastrophic smallpox epidemic in the 1770s on the western coast is estimated to have cost the lives of at least one-third of the Pacific Coast Indians; among the Salish in what is now the United States, the losses were probably much higher, so high that they could hardly defend themselves against raids by the initially less affected peoples from the north. Again and again the disease flared up, as in 1790, when the visit of a ship led by the Spaniard Manuel Quimper to the Beecher Bay First Nation transmitted the disease; among the Lower Elwha Klallam alone, at least 335 skeletons were found at Tse-whit-zen in 2005. Overland trade soon played as large a role in the spread as it did in transmission by the crews of fur trader ships. Thus, among the inland Salish of the Flathead, Spokane, and Coeur d'Alene living in the backcountry, a "great disease" occurred in 1807 to 1808, but it is not until the epidemic of 1853 that it can be said with certainty that it was smallpox.

Other important trade goods were otter and beaver pelts, fish oil and fat (especially the buttery fat of the candlefish), but also timber for the plank houses and for the forts of the fur trading companies. In addition, there were blankets, some of which were made from the hair of goats, around the Juan de Fuca Strait also often from the specially kept dogs. Dogs were probably kept like flocks of sheep and provided white and dark fibers for blankets, mats, baskets, and clothing that were widely traded. With the severance of numerous trade contacts, blankets became an important commodity soon traded by the Hudson's Bay Company. They were also offered as barter for abandoned land when reservations were established.

The raiding and pillaging campaigns of the tribes living north of the Salish, especially the Haida, Kwakwaka'wakw, and Tlingit, which were intensified by the first fur traders and the steady influx of arms, may have done considerable damage to the trade in some years. What economic changes the looted people led to among the northern tribes seems to have been little explored.

=== Mass immigration ===
But still the number of settlers in the region was extremely small, even if California was flooded with gold seekers. This was joined by early settlers in Washington and Oregon. In 1850, a census recorded 1,049 white residents in what is now Washington; by 1860, there were 11,594. With the Gold Rush on the Fraser of 1858, the population further north also skyrocketed. Thousands of mostly armed gold prospectors - mostly from California - combed the region, displacing or killing an unknown number of Indians. In the process, the "old settlers" quickly became a minority. This in turn forced the British colonial government to provide a counterbalance. Thus, it urgently encouraged immigration from Great Britain, pushing the Stó:lō or Tait (also spelled Tiyt, Upper Stó:lō) in particular even closer together, and deporting others to tiny, out-of-the-way reservations.

Douglas had already swung toward reservation policy some time ago; even the first treaties with the tribes around Victoria or Nanaimo made this clear. Thus, in 1861, he ordered the Chief Commissioner of Lands and Works to take measures to establish reservation boundaries. The expansion of Indian Reserves, however, was to be set out by the natives themselves. This comparatively mild Indian policy ended in 1864 with Joseph Trutch as Chief Commissioner of Lands and Works.

Such a mild Indian policy had existed in the United States at best until 1846 or 1855, that is, at the moment when the Hudson's Bay Company, which profited from Indian trade, had to vacate the field in 1846, new interests entered the power game. The Oregon Territory or, from 1853, the Washington Territory was initially of little importance. However, the first settlers from about 1850 onward came into conflict with the indigenous peoples through their land claims and ruthless dealings. The latter had previously dealt mainly with traders, some of whom had even married into their families. This system was quickly destroyed. The basis of the settlers' land claims was the Oregon Donation Land Act of 1850, a law that allowed virtually any settler to appropriate land of up to 320 acres per capita. During the five years it was in effect, some 8,000 claims totaling 3 million acres went to white settlers through this act. The Indians were dispossessed without circumstance.

In 1855, several treaties were made, but the terms were so bad that the Yakima and the Puyallup, for example, rose up against them. But mass troop deployment suppressed the uprisings (1855-1858), which in the case of the Chinook went to near extinction. The reservation of the Cowlitz was simply sold (see Treaty of Point Elliott). Moreover, quite against the custom of local groups, "tribes" were formed that had not existed before. As Governor Stevens put it, "When gathered into large bands it is always in the power of the government to secure the influence of the chiefs, and through them to handle (manage) the people." Incidentally, like his contemporaries, he believed that Indians should be settled on reservations, left to fish, and made farmers by resident whites.

=== Epidemics and mission ===
Worse, however, from the beginning were the epidemics, such as the pox epidemic of 1775 that raged among the Salish. Perhaps in 1801, but certainly in 1824 and 1848, measles followed, and again in 1837 and 1853, 1862 again smallpox. In addition, there were diseases unknown to the Indians, and therefore all the more deadly, such as flu, venereal disease, and tuberculosis. Protective measures by some missionaries and physicians, as in 1853 and 1862, helped only sporadically. Thus, numerous Salish survived around Victoria and in Puget Sound, but this time the North was helplessly exposed to the disaster. Nevertheless, the mission stations also benefited from these disasters, for the loss of cultural knowledge through the death of shamanss and medicine men, elders and healers, plus the belief that their own powers were too weak, caused many Salish to convert to Christianity.

The first missionary was Modeste Demers, a Catholic missionary who reached Fort Langley in 1841. With St. Mary's, an Oblate Mission was established on the Fraser in 1861. Bishop Paul Durieu even succeeded in virtually imposing a God-state among the Sechelts, whose numbers, however, had collapsed from about 5,000 to 200. In 1859, the Methodists in Hope joined them.

But the southern Salish tribes in Washington were also decimated by epidemics, and some tribes disappeared forever, such as the Snokomish. Catholics and Methodists were missionizing as early as 1840 and 1850, respectively, but initially with little success. It was not until after the "Indian Wars" that missionary successes were achieved.

The competition between the denominations led to new internal borders among the Salish. The respective community leaders not only watched over the lifestyles of their youngsters - for which they reinterpreted the watchman system of the Indians and turned it into an instrument of control and punishment - but also disliked the occurrence of mixed-denomination marriages. This further weakened the kinship-based communication system of the Coast Salish, as the denominations, and thus the tribes, kept more to themselves.

=== Reserve policy and the Trutch system ===
British Columbia's Indian policy has always been more ruthless than that of the government in Ottawa. This is partly due to the immigration of gold miners from California, who, with their complete lack of sense of injustice, drove even friendly tribes into rebellion, as in the Fraser Canyon War - after all, it ended almost bloodlessly on the part of the Indians. If Ottawa had still considered 160 acres' Land per family considered appropriate, the provincial government would grant only 25. In 1875 an Indian Reserve Commission was appointed to settle the land question. The principle was to make a deal with each individual nation. But this meant that each individual, regardless of kinship, was assigned to a tribe, which in turn was assigned as a whole a territory, usually not a closed one but a collection of specific points.

The reservations thus created were to be held in trust and reduced or enlarged according to population trends. In 1877, Gilbert Malcolm Sproat became the sole Indian Reserve Commissioner, but he was overthrown in 1880 for conceding too much land. Peter O'Reilly succeeded him until 1898. The federal government repeatedly clashed with provincial policy, and in 1908 the commission began to disband. In 1911, the case was to go to the Supreme Court, but the province refused to cooperate. On September 24, 1912, the McKenna-McBride Commission was established. From 1913 to 1916, the commission visited the reservations. In the end, it recommended 54 reserve reductions totaling 47,000 acres; after protests, it reduced to 35 affected reservations or 36,000 acres. The remaining 733,891 acres were divided into over 1,700 parcels.

=== Resistance under the Constitution ===
The Salish were the first to attempt to move more extensively in the initially unfamiliar political arena, within the three-tiered system of government. In 1906, a delegation traveled to King Edward VII in Britain to lobby for their land claims. Chiefs of the Lillooet met with Prime Minister Wilfrid Laurier in 1912, but he lost the next election. In 1913, the Nishga Petition followed in London, but no action could be taken from there because the lower instances based in Canada would have had to deal with it first.

After realizing the failure, most of the tribes pursued a policy of connecting with each other. Thus, in 1909, the backcountry tribes formed the Interior Tribes of BC and those of the coast formed the Indian Rights Association. These organizations gave rise to the Allied Tribes of British Columbia in 1916 as a counter organization to the McKenna-McBride Commission. Ostentatiously, they again celebrated the potlatch, but arrests occurred, including of chiefs beginning in 1920. In 1923, two of their leaders, Peter Kelly and Andrew Paull, presented demands to the government, first for compensation (2.5 million CAD), then for increases in entitlement to 160 acres in reservation size, plus certain hunting and fishing rights. In addition, there were education and health benefits. The government countered with the Great Settlement of 1927, which denied all land claims. In addition, the Indians were explicitly prohibited from hiring lawyers to assert their rights. This was due, in turn, to the fact that the supreme court of jurisdiction in London, the Judicial Committee of the Privy Council, recognized pre-European rights as continuing until the contrary was established. The government postponed the issue from 1925, allowing plenty of time before a parliamentary inquiry, which was to take place in 1927. At that time, Parliament passed the aforementioned ban on hiring lawyers. Barely a year later, the Allied Tribes disintegrated.

In 1931, the tribes formed the Native Brotherhood of British Columbia, which published the monthly paper Native Voice. In addition, there was participation in the Indian Homemakers' Association and the Confederation of British Columbia Indians. In 1947, as a kind of by-product of a worldwide development in favor of voting rights for minorities, the Indians were given the right to vote at the provincial level. In 1951, they succeeded in getting cultural practices, such as potlatch, exempted from all prohibitions. Children were now allowed to attend public schools, legal counsel could be obtained, and the punishability of alcohol consumption and possession was lifted.

Since the Canadian government curtailed the possibility of appealing to the Judicial Committee in London, from 1949 only Canadian courts were eligible. However, in the early 1950s, Frank Calder of the Nisga'a began a new offensive with regard to land claims. Other groups, such as the Nuu-chah-nulth, also began to organize (1958).

In 1960, the Indians were given the right to vote at the federal level, but in 1965 the Court of Justice in Victoria tried to enforce that in undiscovered British Columbia the law of 1763 had no validity. However, the Supreme Court rejected this. In 1969, the Chief Justice of British Columbia, Davey, nevertheless rejected the Nisga'a land rights, and in 1973 the Supreme Court declared that the Nisga'a had held the rights. While several provinces and the federal government now recognized the land rights in principle, the province still refused. However, the ruling Social Credit Party now made a new argument, namely that nothing had been paid for the cession of these rights when joining Confederation.

In the mid-1980s, 75% of the participants in a vote of the Vancouver Sun recognized the rights of the Indians. In 1988, the BC First Nations Congress was formed, chaired by Bill Wilson. Beginning in 1989, he held non-binding talks with resource companies, to which the government soon agreed. Unrest in other provinces also led to blockades in British Columbia, especially among the St'at'imc. In 1992, the provincial government recognized both land rights and the right to self-government (self-government). In 1993, the provincial Supreme Court even recognized legal rights, albeit limited, to non-reserve lands. Since then, treaty negotiations have been ongoing for each of the negotiating groups. Of the Salish, only the Tsawwassen have so far accepted a treaty, and another has yet to be ratified, but the only one that has gone through the entire process is that of the Nisga'a.

=== Economic changes ===
The early fur trade put prestige, weapons, and political power into fewer hands than before. Initially, those tribes that were the first to profit from the fur trade had an advantage. But this also brought whites into their territory, and the danger of being hit by epidemics grew rapidly.

The Coast Salish on the lower Fraser River (and Puget Sound) were the first to be affected. In addition, the emerging farms made gathering and digging impossible for Indian women. Then, increasingly industrial fishing, which the Canadian government assisted with restrictions against the Indians, destroyed the Salish fish trade. Structures, such as the railroad bridge over the Fraser, destroyed even the fish ladders necessary for fish, ending some of the mass fish runs. In addition, there were dams. Lakes, like Lake Sumas, were simply drained in the 1920s for farmland.

Indians increasingly hired themselves out as loggers, sawmill assistants, and for a time even as miners in the coal mines and as sailors. Others worked in the fishing industry, the men mostly as fishermen, the women gutting and packing. But Chinese displaced them first in railroad construction, then Japanese and Europeans in fishing. Legislation prevented commercial fishing among the Indians. They increasingly relied on day labor, unskilled work, and seasonal employment.

==== Industrialization by and with the Salish ====
By then, Indians, even dominantly until 1862, supplied the growing city of Victoria with building materials, labor, and food. In 1859, over 2,800 Indians camped near the city, including perhaps 600 Songhees, 405 Haida, 574 Tsimshian, plus 223 Stikine River Tlingit, 111 Duncan Cowichan, 126 Heiltsuk, 62 Pacheedaht, and 44 Kwakwaka'wakw. They had integrated the newcomers into their extensive trading system. They were so successful in this that even the protracted wars were largely absent. The Makah in northwest Washington, belonging to the Nuu-chah-nulth, formed the Neah Bay Fur Sealing Company in 1880 and chartered the ship Lottie in Port Townsend. The Lottie was eventually purchased by Chief James Claplanhoo, and three more schooners were added, finally the Discovery in Victoria. In 1886, Chief Peter Brown purchased the schooner Champion.

When extensive coal deposits were discovered, it was thanks to the Nanaimo Coal Tyee who asked the Hudson's Bay Company if it had any value on the black mountain burning. He himself had already shipped coal from there to Victoria. In 1852, Joseph MacKay, senior officer at Fort Nanaimo, expressed satisfaction with the work of the Indians in the mines. Of the first 1400 barrels unearthed, half were from them. Also, many of them became members in the unions. In 1890, Thomas Salmon, a resident of Nanaimo, was sent to Ottawa to represent the Miners and Mine Labourers Protective Association. During the coal strike in Nanaimo from 1912 to 1914, Indians refused to work as strikebreakers, ending up on blacklists.

But most Indians worked in the fishing industry. While 1,500 to 2,000 worked as fishermen and rowers around 1900, by 1929 there were 3,632. Again, they participated in the first fishermen's strike as early as 1893. Likewise, they were involved in union formations, such as the Squamish in the formation of the International Longshoremen's Association in 1912. They also participated in the dock strikes in Vancouver of 1923 and 1935.

Since the 1960s, numerous positions have been created in self-government through state funding. These positions were often held by women. In the meantime, many tribes are trying to become economically independent again by using their territory for tourism after a large part of the natural resources have been used up or destroyed. Since 1993, they have also been allowed to engage in limited salmon fishing on the Fraser for commercial purposes. However, salmon stocks are in massive decline, partly due to fish farms, partly due to climatic changes.

==== Gambling and Entertainment, Tourism and Culture (USA) ====
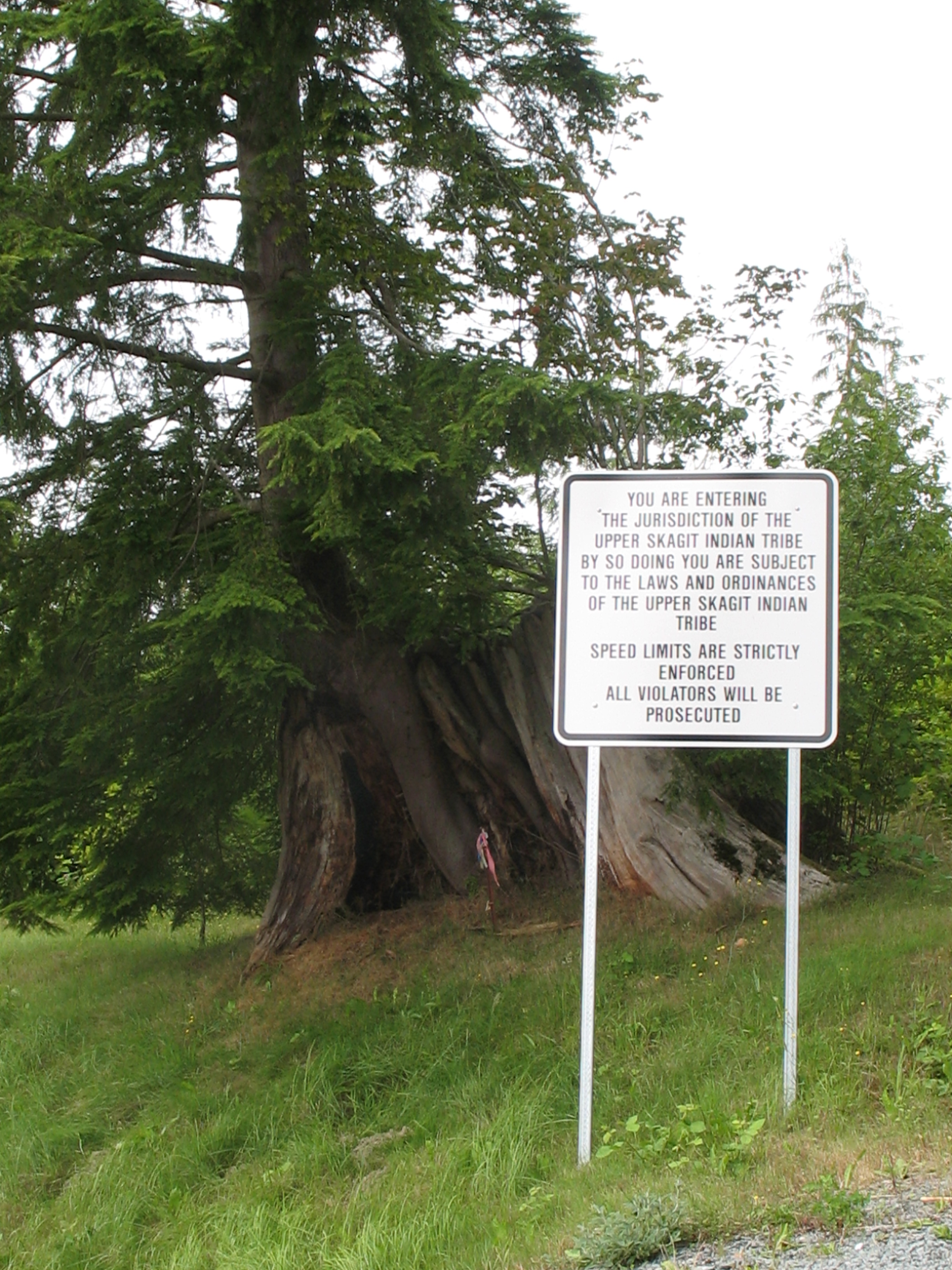
Sign on the road to the Upper Skagit reservation indicating their sovereign rights: "You are entering the legal territory of the Upper Skagit Indian Tribe - By doing so, you are subject to the laws and ordinances of the Upper Skagit Tribe ..."

The Coast Salish in the United States took a different economic trajectory. Here, strong impetus for self-organization initially came from the California Mission Indian Federation (1919-1965), which was succeeded in 1972 by the Southern California Tribal Chairmen's Association. In the Northwest, tribes banded together to form the Northwest Federation of Indians, many of whose representatives relied on existing treaties.

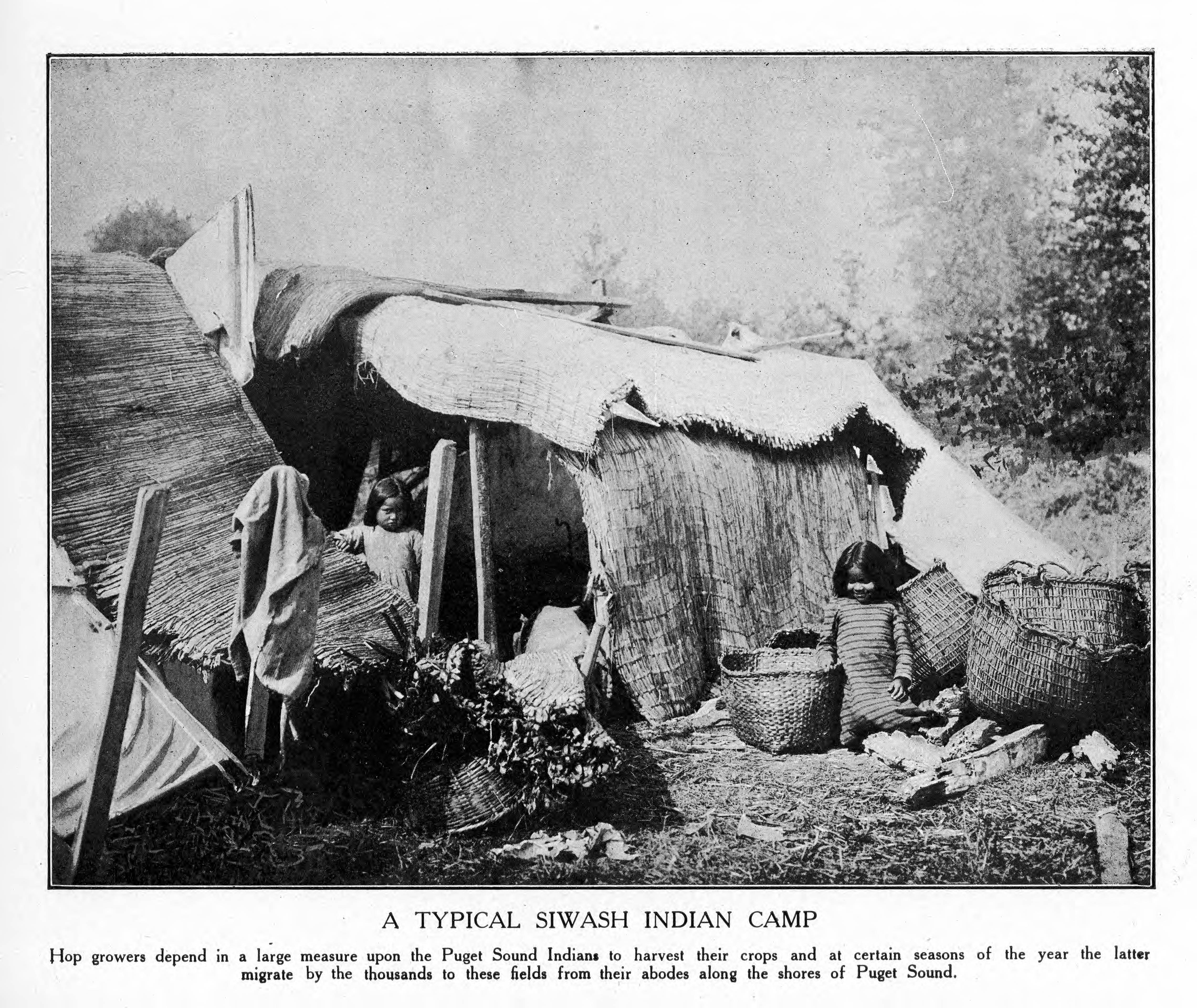
Family tent harvesting hops in Washington, circa 1900

Seasonal employment was available in the state's agriculture, especially during the harvest season. For example, the important cultivation of hops for beer production provided numerous summer employment opportunities. In many cases, families moved from one harvest operation to the next.

In 1934, the U.S. abandoned its policy of weakening tribal associations and breaking them up into individuals. A significant breakthrough was the 1987 California v. Cabazon Band of Mission Indians court case, which strengthened Indian sovereignty and prohibited state interference in the important casino business (see Cahuilla). These gambling establishments have since evolved into profitable entertainment venues, which have shifted their original focus in favor of comprehensive tourism and entertainment offerings. Several Coast Salish tribes also maintain such casinos, such as the Muckleshoot or the Skokomish, the Tulalip, the Shoalwater Bay tribe, the Upper Skagit, and as of 2009, the Snoqualmie.

At the same time, some tribes are showing tremendous growth. For example, the Puyallup on southern Puget Sound, which by 1850 consisted of only 50 survivors of severe epidemics, slowly rebounded at first. Gaining land rights, sovereignty, and economic self-sufficiency not only attracted new residents to the reservation and its environs, but more and more people acknowledged their Native American heritage. Today, the tribe again boasts more than 3,800 members.

=== Revival of spirituality ===
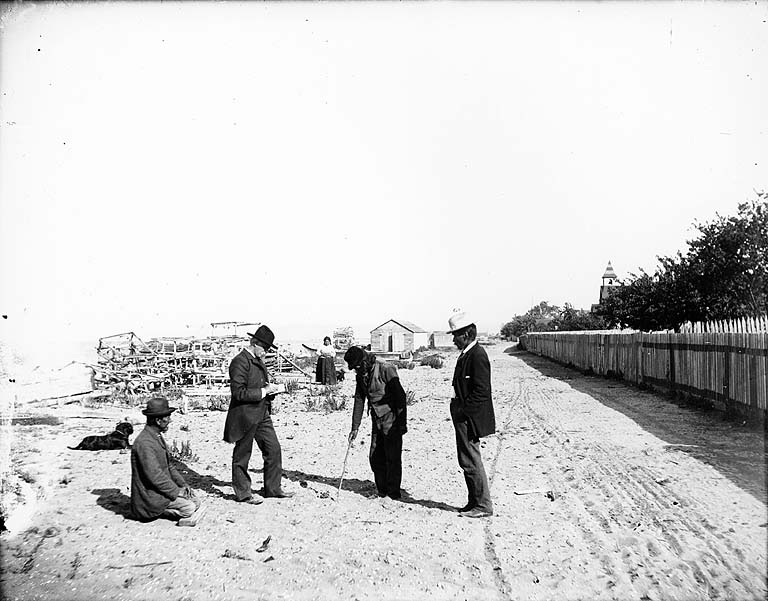
Klallam men in Sunday clothes on the beach, a Shaker church in the background

The Indian Shaker Church, combining Christian and indigenous spiritual concepts, is based on the personal death and rebirth experiences of a coastal Salish from Puget Sound named John Slocum. From there, the doctrine, launched in 1882, spread to British Columbia.

Winter Spirit Dance was rediscovered since the 1950s and reached its first peak in the 1990s. Even before the potlatch ban was lifted, there was a corresponding movement, but when the ban was lifted in 1951, they were allowed to go public again. Ten years later, there were still only about 100 dancers, but by the 1990s, 500 or more dancers often gathered. A song and spirit helper introduces the necessary knowledge, rituals such as bathing in the wilderness, restriction to certain food, are meant to strengthen the novice in his isolation from the environment.

Potlatches are meanwhile celebrated when someone is to receive the name of an ancestor, a funeral is pending, in memory of a deceased. Guests are invited from all over the Salish area to attend. Sometimes everything in the house is given away.

Also revived were the arts of carving, painting and weaving. Susan Point of the Musqueam has achieved national fame. In addition, there is canoe building. Canoe trips now attract many tourists, but there are also competitions between the tribes and clans.

Powwows, inter-tribal dance gatherings have also gained in popularity. Still, not all songs can be sung and played, as they are tied to seasons or specific ceremonies, often to specific clans. These celebrations culminate annually in a large cross-border gathering of all Coast Salish, whose participants are welcomed by the tribes in turn.

Engaging in culture and history has also made some familiar. Sonny McHalsie, a Stó:lō, has researched and documented numerous Halkomelem place names. He is employed by his tribe as a cultural specialist.

=== Aftermath: Mission, Residential Schools, Education ===
Part of the repertoire of pre-European education was the recitation of oral tradition, which included family histories, history and genealogy, legends and myths. This task was the responsibility of elders, but also took place through instruction of young women by elders in menstrual huts, and in the case of shamans, by some sort of mentor. Grandparents were very important in this. Even as children, the historians of families and tribes were selected and taught.

The Residential Schools, whose primary goal was assimilation to the Canadian way of life, were closed in the 1970s and 1980s. Both the churches and the state have since apologized for the conditions that prevailed there and have set up a program to make amends. Tribes, such as the Stó:lō Band on Seabird Island offer language courses and taught their children themselves. Language courses have been increasing sharply since the 1990s, and admissions to high schools and universities are also on the rise. The First Nations House of Learning at the University of British Columbia contributed significantly to this.

== Recent history ==
In 1977, the Gitksan-Carrier Declaration demanded, "Recognize our sovereignty, recognize our rights, so that we can fully recognize your rights." Indeed, in 1982, section 35(1) of the Canadian Constitution recognized in principle the claims of the original people (aboriginals) and put the relationship with the levels of government on a new footing. In the Delgamuukw Decision, the Supreme Court of Justice ruled that prior to 1867, aboriginal rights had never been extinguished, and therefore had continued since the founding of Canada. In addition, several court rulings held that Indians had the right to teach their particular culture to their children, with the territory being an integral part. Therefore, any decision affecting this land would have to involve consultation with the affected tribe. In 1997, the Supreme Court ruled that the rights refer to rights to land, resources, and the right to cultural traditions, as well as political autonomy.

This decision relates, for example, to the fishing industry, which is Canada's fourth-largest industry. One third of the value is generated in British Columbia alone. It was not until 1990 that the Sparrow decision recognized Indian fishing rights, with priority over other economic claims.

In 1993, British Columbia responded by establishing the BC Treaty Commission. Its initial purpose was to clarify and, if possible, resolve overlapping land claims. At the end of the six-step process, a treaty was to be reached. But the treaty process has divided opinion. The number of holdouts, who believe too many rights and titles are being relinquished, is growing, yet the first treaties are all but finalized. The Sechelt, on the other hand, signed the Sechelt Indian Band Self-Government Act in 1986. Whether they are more than a municipal government remains to be seen.

The hallmark of Salish politics has long been a certain smallness, broken first by cross-border ties but then by representatives in the highest bodies. For example, Musqueam candidate Wendy Grant narrowly lost election as Grand Chief of the Assembly of First Nations.

One of the tribal councils representing a larger group of Salish is the Hul'qumi'num Treaty Group, formed in 1993. It represents the 6,200 members of the Chemainus First Nation, Cowichan Tribes, Halalt First Nation, Lake Cowichan First Nation, Lyackson First Nation, and the Penelakut Tribe. They are concerned with 59,000 ha of land sold to settlers in the 1860s, 268,000 ha granted in 1884 to build the Esquimalt and Nanaimo Railway on Vancouver Island. Coal mining, forestry and other industries have left little of the original landscape. As a result, virgin forest now exists on only 0.5% of the tribe's territory. Most reservations are smaller than 40 ha. In the traditional tribal area, only 48,000 ha are still Crown Land, or 15%. Of this, 8,000 ha are secured as parks and protected areas. Over 84% is thus privately owned, of which nearly 200,000 ha alone is in the hands of a few timber companies. But this is what the often poor communities fear most, that their members will gradually sell out in the event of privatization.

In 1994, in accordance with the change in the law, there was an opportunity for the first time in the expansion of Victoria, the capital of British Columbia, under the Bamberton Town Development Project to find workable ways. Under the auspices of the Environmental Assessment Office, a cohesive project was developed to address the demands of the six affected tribes, i.e., the Malahat, Tsartlip, Pauquachin, Tseycum and Tsawout Bands]], and the Cowichan Tribes should be considered. The report outlined the traditional and current uses of the affected lands, considered the importance to the aforementioned tribes. Lessons learned from this led to the protection of various areas in the newly formed city and resulted in Native American participation in the development of marine protected areas, such as Race Rocks, in 1998. The Lester B. Pearson College instructional program since then has included not only biological content, but also cultural aspects, in this case of the Beecher Bay First Nations. The 13-Monde system again plays an important role in this. In the year 2000 the Beecher Bay invited to a celebration, to which all involved people appeared. According to the rituals, the younger ones served as servants, namely the ancestors, to whose honor food was also burned.

Among the Coast Salish, the number of women working as councillors has increased from 11 to almost 30% since the 1960s. The number of people employed by the Stó:lō nation increased tenfold between 1990 and 1997, from about 20 to about 200. Meanwhile, people also receive money for useful work they have long done without pay, such as caregiving, teaching, maintenance, landscape conservation, etc.

The situation south of the U.S. border is strongly influenced by attempts to participate in tourism and entertainment. casinos and hotels have become important sources of income. At the same time, tribal territories are much less sharply defined on the one hand, and much more heavily populated by non-tribal members on the other. In addition, the tribes are often considerably larger. They strive predominantly for self-governance and maintain their own political bodies, courts, executive organs, and so on.

This historical legacy ensures that it is not easy to determine what constitutes a tribe, even though the government has established a seven-criteria catalog. Since only the tribes as a whole are allowed to operate casinos, and these in turn have proven to be enormously important providers of jobs, one tribe or another tries to prevent (as yet) unrecognized tribes from being accepted by the state in order to keep out the competition. Thus, it is not only the state that delays and complicates procedures.

Despite such opposition, the Coast Salish see themselves as a transboundary, cohesive group that has been developing a program to restore and protect the natural environment since 2007. To that end, representatives of both Canadian and U.S. Salish tribes gathered on the Cowichan reservation in British Columbia and the Tulalip reservation in Washington from January 24–26, 2007, and February 27–29, 2008, respectively. These meetings have been held since 2005. Their participants consider themselves responsible for the entire coast claimed by Salish tribes, and consequently call it Salish Sea.

In light of the Olympic Winter Games planned on the territory of the Squamish and the St'at'imc as well as other Salish tribes, a section of the Squamish, particularly the Native Youth Movement, opposes the expropriation of the territory they claim (No Olympics on Stolen Land). The leaders of the so-called four host tribes, the Lil'wat, Musqueam, Squamish and Tsleil-Waututh, on the other hand, support the Olympics and derive profits from them.

The ten Salish tribes that have applied for recognition but are not recognized in the United States include (as of 15. February 2007) in Washington include the Steilacoom Tribe, the Snohomish Tribe of Indians (denied in 2004), the Samish Tribe of Indians, the Cowlitz Tribe of Indians, the Jamestown Clallam, the Snoqualmie Tribal Organization, the Duwamish Tribe (denied in 2002), the resp. Chinook Indian Tribe/Chinook Nation (rejected 2003), the Snoqualmoo Tribe of Whidbey Island. In Oregon, the Tchinouk Indians are not recognized (rejected 1986). The Mitchell Bay Band of the San Juan Islands is similarly unrecognized.

== See also ==
- History of British Columbia
- History of Washington (state)
