= Culturally modified tree =

Modification of a tree by indigenous people as part of their tradition

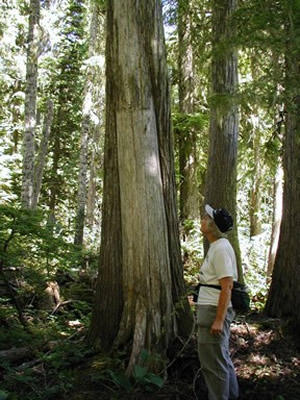
A culturally modified tree in Gifford Pinchot National Forest, Washington, USA

For thousands of years, forest-dwelling peoples worldwide have harvested wood, branches, bark, resin, roots, and leaves without killing the trees. As a result, many living trees around the world still show physical signs of these past activities. In western Canada and the United States, a culturally modified tree (CMT) is one which has been modified by indigenous people as part of their tradition. Culturally modified trees are of ethnological significance as records of human interaction with trees and forest ecosystems.

In British Columbia, one of the most commonly modified trees, particularly on the coast, is the Western Red Cedar.

The Sami people of northern Scandinavia and indigenous people of southeast Australia modify trees. Basque herders left thousands of trees in the western United States between 1860 and 1930.

== Regions ==
=== Australia ===
The role of cedars, spruces etc. are taken over by much different species in Australia. Here the red (river) gum (Eucalyptus camaldulensis) and the grey box (Eucalyptus moluccana) are of most importance. There are certain similarities as far as the usage is concerned. Rhoads published in 1992 that within the territory of Southwest Victoria (about 10,000 km^{2}) 228 CMTs were found in the vicinity of ancient camps.

CMT in Australia are modified for different reasons. They include carved artworks and scar they are also referred to 'scar trees' s or the binding of branches to produce a 'ring tree'.

'Ring trees' were shaped early in their growth by inserting an object into the trunk or tying a branch to part of the tree. These were likely used to mark territorial boundaries between Nations. They are most often found along the Murray River but exist in other parts of southeastern Australia as well.

Trees are scared to produce containers for carrying food and water, for production of shield. Modifying trees with a series of holes and marks was used to enable people to climb trees to harvest honey, birds, eggs, possums and other animals. Another use was the production of ‘Canoe tree’.

Ceremonial or place markers in the landscape include dendroglyphs—carvings made into trees after removing a section of bark. These carvings come in two main forms. Teleteglyphs were used for teaching cultural knowledge in ceremonial contexts, while taphoglyphs marked burial sites. Taphoglyphs are especially linked to the Wiradjuri and Gamilaroi (Gomeroi) Nations in western New South Wales, though teleteglyphs have also been found across parts of New South Wales and Victoria, particularly near the Murray River.

Scar trees, which still appear throughout the landscape, are the result of bark removal for tools or cultural practices. They are ongoing signs of cultural knowledge and presence, though often unrecognised by non-Indigenous people.

=== Canada ===
In Canada, while research has been concentrated in the western provinces with their old forests, CMTs have been documented in northwestern Ontario. In Nagagamisis Provincial Park most trees found were 80–110 years old, some probably more than 400.

In British Columbia, culturally modified trees are subject to protection under the Heritage Conservation Act. Trees dating before 1846 and registered as CMTs are not allowed to be logged. The first lawsuit concerning CMTs was against a Canadian who had logged CMTs over 300 years old. The oldest living CMT was found in British Columbia, an example of bark stripping that dates to 1186..

On Hanson Island alone, David Garrick documented 1800 CMTs. The Kwakwaka'wakw of the region could stop the destruction of their archive. Garrick also found trees in the Great Bear Rainforest on the territory of the Gitga'at First Nation. They are supposed to be logged for a street in the area of Langford. In February 2008, the Times Colonist reported of protesters being removed.

No license was given between 1996 and 2006, but in that year it was allowed once again - against the resistance of the Haida on Haida Gwaii. Even if loggers accept the restrictions and spare a CMT, these trees are endangered because they lose their "neighbours" and with them the protection against heavy storms. Consequently, Hupacasath First Nation on the western shore of Vancouver Island claims a protective zone around the trees of at least 20–30 metres (66–98 ft).

The trees are a source of utmost importance for the history of the First Nations, a history that is heavily dependent on oral traditions and archaeological findings for the pre-contact phase.

This causes many problems for historians, ethnohistorians, anthropologists. As awareness grew, conservation standards began to be established in the early 1980s, however, surviving old-growth forests with preserved evidence of use had already been heavily impacted by industrial logging.

Access to sacred places is often constrained, in the case of the Nuu-chah-nulth on Vancouver Island, only elders know the corresponding rituals, devices, stories and dances, so obtaining appropriate consent is required.

The tiny Island of Flores is home to 71 registered culturally modified trees. Protection is established under Section 27 of the Clayoquot Sound Interim Measures Extension Agreement.

After historians and the courts had recognized that the trees of Meares Island are crucial for the culture and history of the Indian Nation living there, other indigenous groups started to register CMTs in their own reserves and in their traditional territories to get the same protection for them.

Gottesfeld could detect 21 species, which played a certain role as CMTs. Of utmost importance is the Western red cedar (Thuja plicata), but the yellow cedar (Chamaecyparis nootkatensis), spruces (Picea glauca u.a.), hemlock (Tsuga heterophylla), pines (Pinus contorta, Pinus ponderosa), in addition Populus tremuloides, Populus trichocarpa and Alnus rubra are also quite frequent. The bark of hemlock and certain spruces was important for nourishment and medicine. The resin of spruces was used as a kind of glue.

=== Scandinavia ===
CMTs have become important for the history of Scandinavia, too. The Sami people, who also ate certain kinds of bark, were displaced northwards in the 19th century by the Swedish population, who did not eat bark. Consequently, the traces of bark peelers are interrupted from one year to the next, so that historians can exactly tell when the last Sami left the region under examination. The oldest finding ever registered is 2800 years old. Meanwhile, the methods are so much refined that even fossil trees have become an important source for human history.

=== United States ===
The most surprising fact was a consequence of research within the Bob Marshall Wilderness in northwestern Montana. This is a wilderness of about 3,000 km^{2} (in addition another 3000 of neighbouring wildernesses) that was never used by non-aboriginal people. There are no houses, streets, fields or pastures. Nevertheless, the CMTs showed that in between 1665 and 1938, indigenous people peeled the bark and conducted other uses.

In 1985 a protection program was started in Washington's Gifford Pinchot National Forest. At 338 spots, more than 6000 CMTs were identified, of which 3000 are protected now.

Seventeen CMTs were found in the Blue Mountain area within Pike National Forest, at least 26 in Florissant Fossil Beds National Monument. Trees more than 200 years old were registered in Manitou Experimental Forest north of Woodland Park. Most of these trees within the territory of the Ute are ponderosa pines. Ute elders have differing opinions as to whether CMTs are a tradition. Researchers know that they haven't got that much time. The trees have a life expectancy of 300 to 600 years. Many could be dated, being peeled between 1816 and 1848. In February 2008, the Colorado Historical Society decided to invest a part of its 7 million dollar budget into a CMT project in Mesa Verde National Park.

The Bureau of Land Management provides this form for the documentation of CMTs, in conjunction with History Colorado's Office of Archaeology & Historic Preservation.
