= Terry Glavin =

Canadian author and journalist (1955)

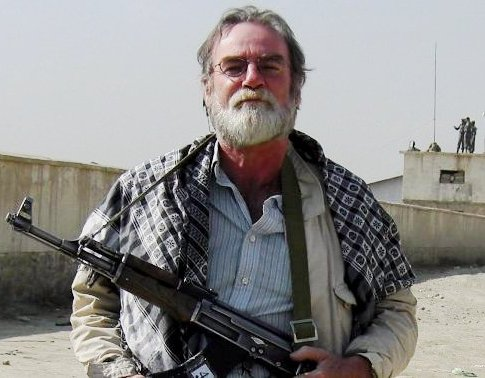
Terry Glavin

Terry Glavin (born 1955) is a Canadian author and journalist.

== Career ==
Born in the United Kingdom to Irish parents, he emigrated to Canada in 1957. Glavin has worked as a journalist and columnist for The Other Press (copy editor), The Daily Columbian (reporter, columnist and assistant city editor), The Vancouver Sun (columnist), The Globe and Mail (columnist), The Georgia Straight (columnist), and The Tyee. He has been with the Ottawa Citizen since 2011. He has contributed articles to many newspapers and magazines, including Canadian Geographic, Vancouver Review, Democratiya, The National Post, Seed, Adbusters, and Lettre International (Berlin). He founded and was chief editor of Transmontanus Books, an imprint of New Star Books.

He was a sessional instructor in the Writing Department of the Fine Arts Faculty at the University of Victoria in Victoria, British Columbia, and an adjunct professor in the Department of Creative Writing at the University of British Columbia in Vancouver.

In 2009, he won the British Columbia Lieutenant Governor's Award for Literary Excellence for his books and magazine and newspaper articles.

Glavin's writing covers a wide range of regional and global topics from natural history and anthropology to current politics. His work as a journalist and writer have taken him to Central America, China, the Eastern Himalayas, the Russian Far East, Afghanistan, and Israel, and his books have been published in Canada, the United States, the United Kingdom and Germany. He is a signatory of the Euston Manifesto.

Glavin describes himself as a "west coast conservationist."

== Bibliography ==
Glavin's first book, A Death Feast in Dimlahamid (1990), dealt with the struggles of the Gitxsan and Wet'suwet'en peoples, drawing on an account of the oral traditions of Dimlahamid, also known as Temlaham, an ancient city said to have existed in that region. His second book, Nemiah: The Unconquered Country (1992), a cultural and historical account of British Columbia's Chilcotin District, included some of the Tsilhqot'in people's perspective on the Chilcotin War of 1864. Ghost in the Water, on the giant green sturgeon in British Columbia's rivers, was published by New Star in 1994.

Among his best known works is The Last Great Sea: A Voyage Through the Human and Natural History of the North Pacific Ocean (2000), which was nominated for the Bill Duthie Booksellers' Choice Award and the Roderick Haig-Brown Regional Prize, and was the winner of the Hubert Evans Non-Fiction Prize. In total, he has authored seven books on his own, and three in collaboration with other authors. Books published since The Last Great Sea are

- North of Caution, Vancouver: Ecotrust Canada, 2002 (with Ian Gill, Richard Manning, Ben Parfitt and Alex Rosel)
- Amongst God's Own: The Enduring Legacy of St. Mary’s Mission, Vancouver: New Star Books, 2002 ISBN 978-0-9686046-1-8 (with former students of St. Mary's)
- Waiting for the Macaws: And Other Stories from the Age of Extinctions, Toronto: Viking Canada, 2006
- The Sixth Extinction: Journeys Among the Lost and Left Behind, New York: Thomas Dunne Books, 2006 ISBN 978-0-312-36231-7
- Come from the Shadows: The Long and Lonely Struggle for Peace in Afghanistan, Vancouver: Douglas & McIntyre, 2011
- Sturgeon Reach: Shifting Currents at the Heart of the Fraser with Ben Parfitt, Vancouver: New Star Books, 2011

Other works by Glavin are:

- A Death Feast in Dimlahamid, Vancouver: New Star Books, 1990 ISBN 978-0-921586-14-2 (revised edition 1998)
- Nemiah: The Unconquered Country, Vancouver: New Star Books, 1992
- A Ghost in the Water, Vancouver: New Star Books, 1994
- Dead Reckoning: Confronting the Crisis in Pacific Fisheries, Vancouver: Greystone Books, 1996
- This Ragged Place: Travels Across the Landscape, Vancouver: New Star Books, 1996
- A Voice Great Within Us, Vancouver: New Star Books, 1998 (with Charles Lillard)
- The Last Great Sea: A Voyage Through the Human and Natural History of the North Pacific Ocean, Vancouver: Greystone Books, 2000

== Awards ==
In 2009, Glavin was awarded the Lieutenant Governor's Award for Literary Excellence for contributing significantly to the development of literary excellence in British Columbia and the Hubert Evans Prize for Non-Fiction. He has a total of eleven awards including several National Magazine Awards:

- Best Column in a Magazine, Western Magazine Awards, 1998
- Science, Technology and Medicine Prize, National Magazine Awards Foundation, 1998
- Science Technology and Medicine Prize, Western Magazine Awards, 1998
- Jack Webster Awards prize for Science and Technology, 1997
- "Science in Society" prize from the Canadian Science Writers Association, 1996
- Special Award for Editorial Innovation, Impact or Courage, Western Magazine Awards, 1994
- Gold prize, Travel Writing, National Awards Foundation, 1994
- Best Essay of the Year, National Magazine Awards Foundation, 1993
- Best Essay, "Public Issues" Category, Western Magazine Awards
- Science Technology and Medicine Prize, Western Magazine Awards, 1993
- Silver Prize, National Magazine Awards
