= Nagagamisis Provincial Park =

Provincial park in Ontario

- IUCN category II (national park)
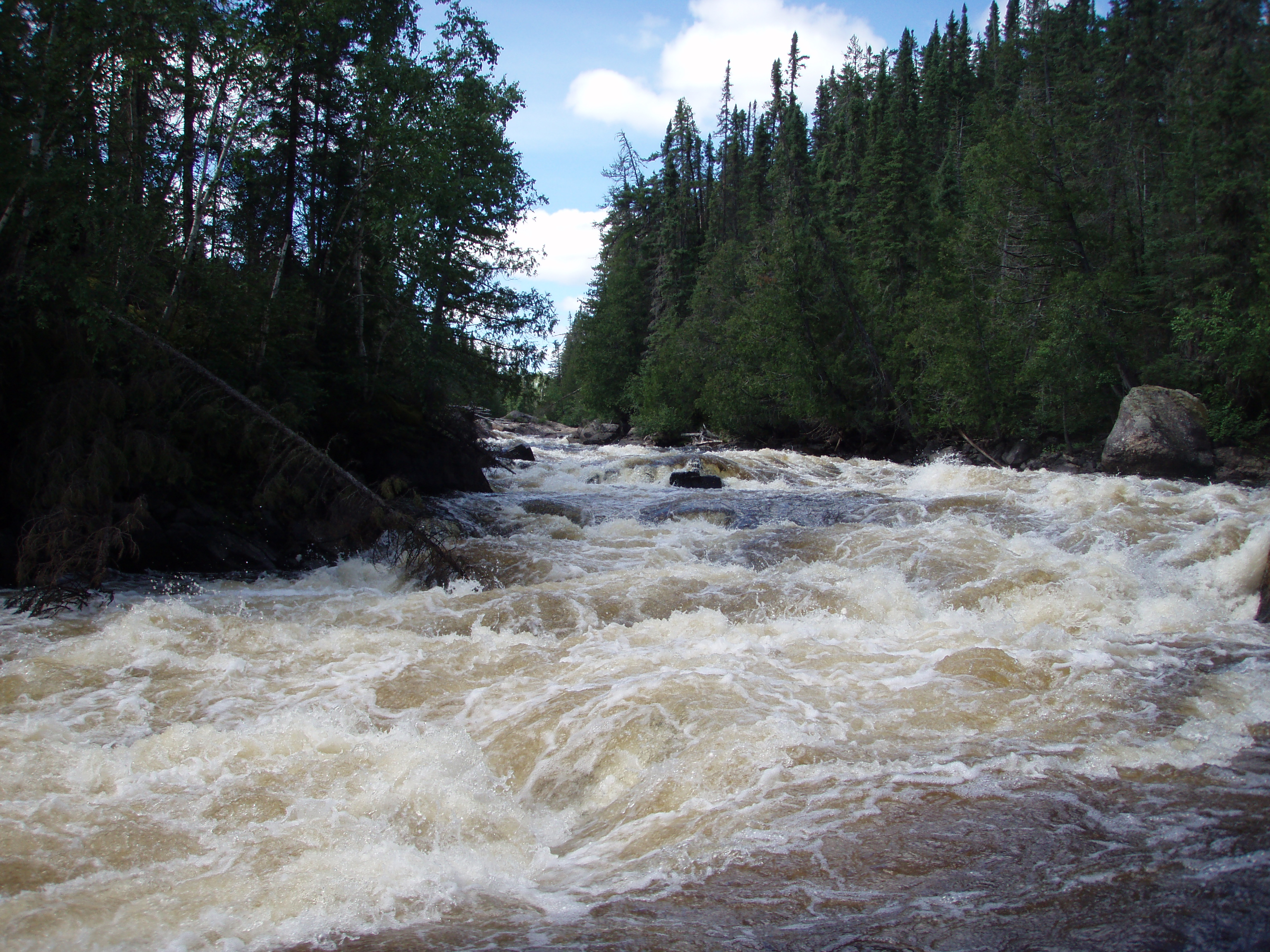
- Jackpine Rapids on Nagagami River

- Location within Ontario
- Interactive map of Nagagamisis Provincial Park
- Location: Algoma District, Northeastern Ontario, Canada
- Nearest town: Hornepayne
- Coordinates: 49°27′48″N 84°44′47″W
- Area: 40,683 ha (157.08 sq mi)
- Designation: Natural Environment
- Established: 1957
- Named for: Nagagamisis Lake
- Visitors: 35,636 (in 2022)
- Governing body: Ontario Parks
- Website: www.ontarioparks.com/park/nagagamisis

Nagagamisis Provincial Park is a provincial park in Algoma District, Ontario, Canada. It is located 32 kilometres (20 mi) north of Hornepayne, along Highway 631. It protects a large piece of land surrounding Nagagamisis Lake, as well as long linear sections along the Foch and Nagagami Rivers.

Nagagamisis is an operating park, featuring two campgrounds with a total of 107 drive-in campsites, of which 17 are pullthroughs to accommodate RVs. Amenities include two nature trails, a boat launch, docks, store, playground, beach, and equipment rentals. Permitted activities include boating, canoeing, camping (also backcountry camping), hiking, biking, swimming, fishing, and hunting. It is managed and staffed by Ontario Parks.

== Description ==
The park is located at the western edge of the Great Clay Belt in Northeastern Ontario. Its landscape is characterized by moraines with spruce and jack pine forests, and lacustrine deposits with coniferous and mixed deciduous trees. Many wetlands are present throughout the park. Nagagamisis Lake, with an area of 2,330 hectares (5,800 acres), is the largest lake within the park. It is in the Albany River watershed.

Although the park's original area around Nagagamisis Lake has never been logged, its forests have been disturbed by large wildfires. It completely burned down in the early part of the 20th century, resulting in even-aged stands and a relatively simple vegetation pattern in 1980.

The park is part of the Nagagamisis Central Plateau Signature Site, an area which has both natural and cultural significance. This site also includes the 1,650 ha (4,100 acres) Nagagami Lake Provincial Nature Reserve and the 27,532 ha (68,030 acres) Nagagamisis Lake Enhanced Management Area.

== History ==
Historically, the park's area was visited seasonally by small bands of Cree people, living of fish and small game. A few Cree and Ojibwe families lived on Nagagamisis Lake from the early 1900s until the 1930s, and continued to use the lake as a winter campsite for some time afterwards.

The park was established in 1957, with an original area of 1,530 hectares (3,800 acres) at the west end of Nagagamisis Lake. It went through a few configuration and size changes. Although reduced in size in 1958 by deregulating land on the lake's north shore, it was enlarged to 4,810 hectares (11,900 acres) in 1963, following increased use that resulted from the completion of Highway 631 to Hornepayne. In 1970 and 1978, it was enlarged again to 5,850 hectares (14,500 acres) and 8,131 hectares (20,090 acres) respectively. At that time, the park included almost all of Nagagamisis Lake (except a portion of the north shore with private properties).

Under Ontario's Living Legacy Land Use Strategy, the park became part of the newly designated Nagagamisis Central Plateau Signature Site, and saw a four-fold expansion in 2005, when 32,680 hectares (80,800 acres) were added that joined the park to the Nagagami Lake Provincial Nature Reserve, and that protects a 200 metres (660 ft) strip of land along both banks of the Nagagami River all the way to near its confluence with the Kenogami River (in Cochrane District). It also includes a non-contiguous section along the banks of the Foch River (from the Canadian National Railroad tracks to its outlet at Nagagami Lake).

Future park extensions are being considered as well, or additional land may be protected in the proposed Nagagamisis and Nagagami Lake Park Addition.

== Gallery ==
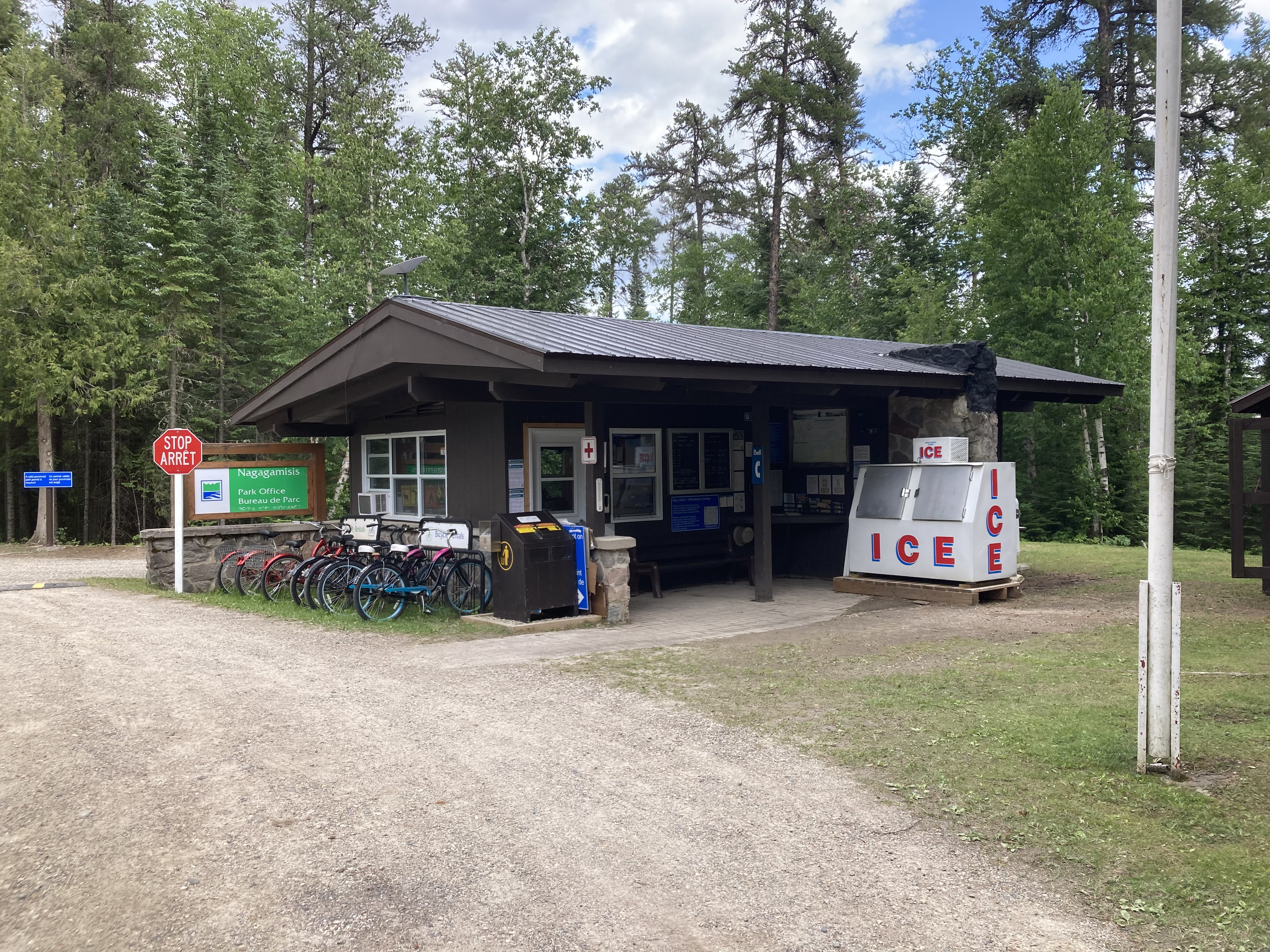
Park office and gatehouse

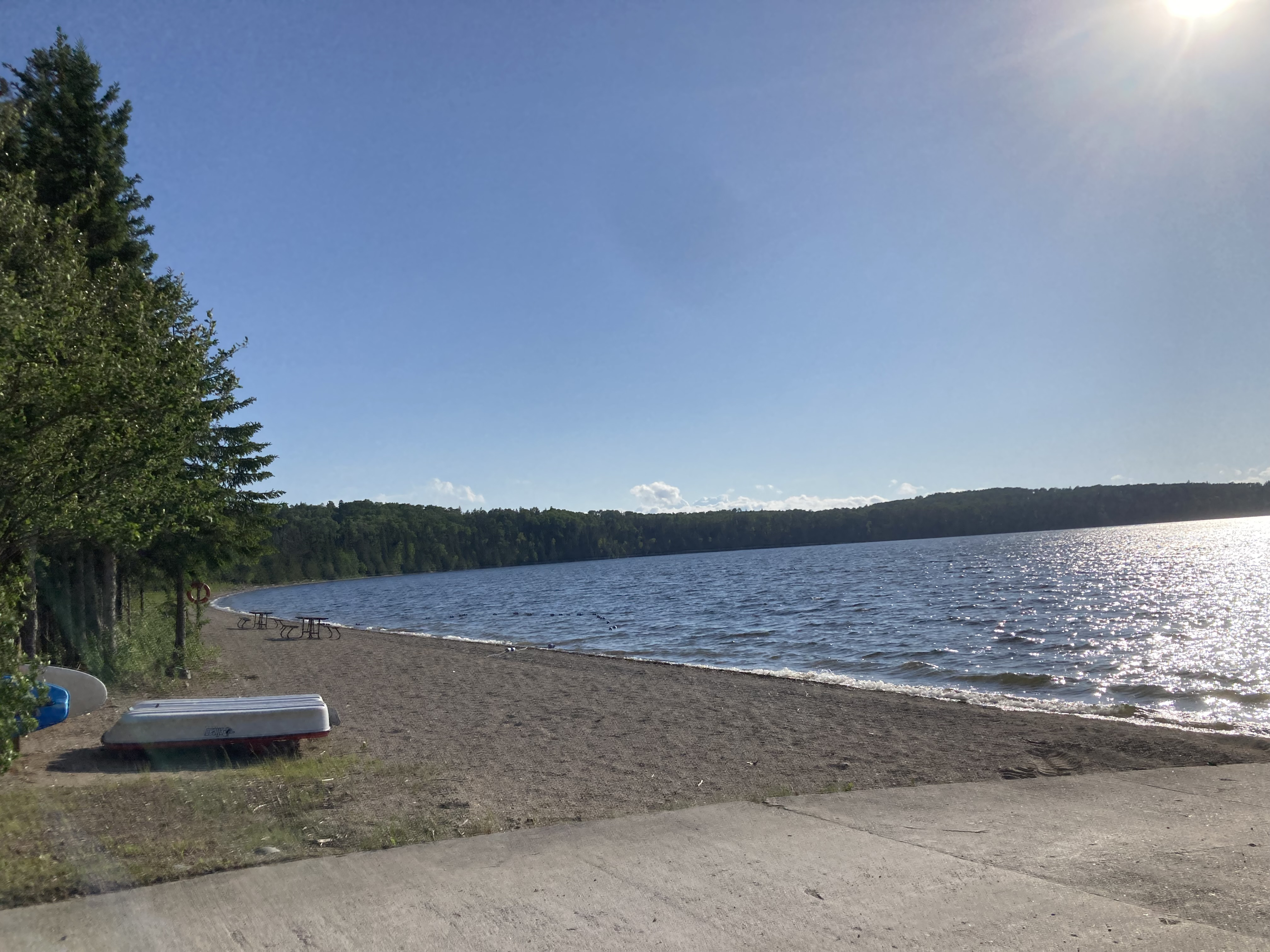
Day-use beach at Nagagamisis Lake

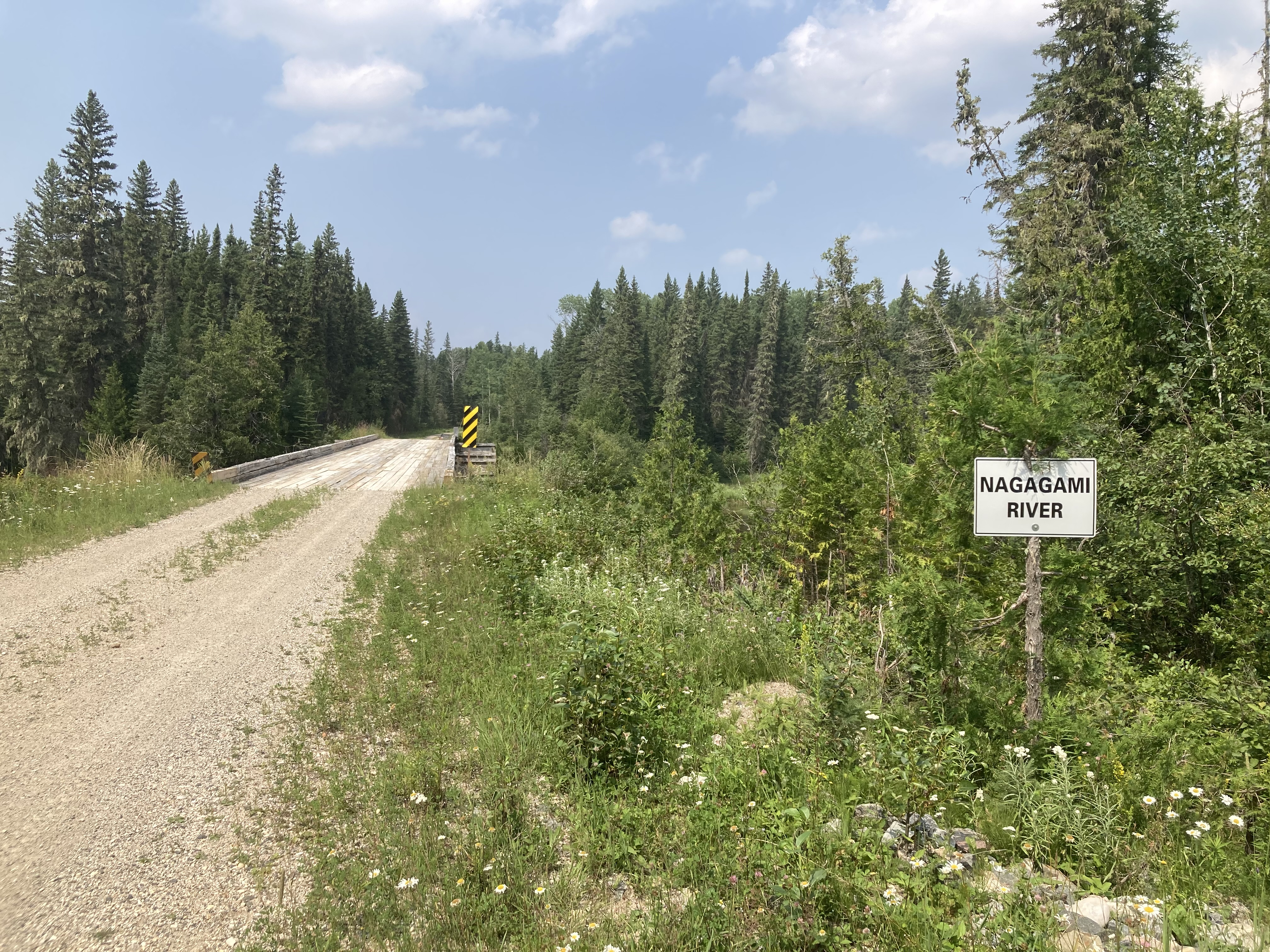
Bridge over Nagagami River at Nagagami Lake Road
