= New Star Books =

Canadian publishing company

New Star Books is an independent Canadian publishing company located in Vancouver, British Columbia. New Star publishes between six and eight new titles each year, their list includes literary fiction, experimental poetry, and socially-critical nonfiction. The press has published more than 300 titles since its founding in 1970.

== History ==
New Star Books has its roots in a literary supplement to the Georgia Straight. Founded by Stan Persky and Dennis Wheeler and originally published as a short pullout section, the Georgia Straight Writing Supplement featured early work from Daphne Marlatt, Jack Spicer, George Stanley, Milton Acorn, and Gerry Gilbert. In 1970, the writing supplement became the Georgia Straight Writing Series and began publishing books, most notably early works by Lisa Robertson, Pauline Holdstock, Mark Leier, Elizabeth Hay, and Terry Glavin.

Renamed, variously, the "York Street commune" and the "Vancouver Community Press," the company acquired its final name, "New Star Books," in 1974, marking a shift in editorial focus from literary to politically engaged, critical, left-leaning nonfiction work.

While Lanny Beckman, New Star's first publisher (becoming so in 1978), predominantly kept to the press's nonfiction, politically oriented direction, in 1990 the press underwent another shift when Rolf Maurer became its publisher and president. Maurer took New Star back to its roots as a literary, experimental press while maintaining its programme of publishing socially-critical books. He also added to New Star's roster the Transmontanus imprint, edited by Terry Glavin and focused on social, environmental, and cultural issues in and around British Columbia.

In 1998, New Star relocated from Kitsilano to its current site, off of Commercial Drive, in East Vancouver. In March 2012, the New Star office was targeted by a suspected arson attack. No injuries were sustained as the attack took place in the early hours of the morning, however the office itself suffered considerable fire, smoke, and water damage. Although the majority of the press's inventory was stored safely in an offsite warehouse, the fifth printing of Lisa Robertson's Debbie: An Epic was almost entirely destroyed.
