= Snoqualmoo Tribe of Whidbey Island =

The Snoqualmoo Tribe of Whidbey Island is a non-federally recognized tribe on Whidbey Island of Washington, United States. They are sometimes erroneously referred to as recognized by the state government, according to the Governor's Office of Indian Affairs in 2008, however, but there is no recognition by the state for this tribe.
