= Governor General's Award for English-language poetry =

Canadian literary award

This is a list of recipients and nominees of the Governor General's Awards award for English-language poetry. The award was created in 1981 when the Governor General's Award for English language poetry or drama was divided.

== Winners and nominees ==
=== 1980s ===
Year	Author	Title	Ref.
1981	F. R. Scott	The Collected Poems of F. R. Scott	
1981	Alfred Bailey	Miramichi Lightning: Collected Poems	
1981	Barry McKinnon	The The	
1982	Phyllis Webb	The Vision Tree: Selected Poems	
1982	Robert Bringhurst	The Beauty of the Weapons: Selected Poems 1972-1982	
1982	Barry Dempster	Fables for Isolated Men	
1982	Diane Keating	No Birds or Flowers	
1983	David Donnell	Settlements	
1983	Christopher Dewdney	Predators of the Adoration: Selected Poems 1972-82	
1983	Don McKay	Birding, or Desire	
1983	Anne Szumigalski	Doctrine of Signatures	
1984	Paulette Jiles	Celestial Navigation	
1984	Roo Borson	The Whole Night, Coming Home	
1984	Marilyn Bowering	The Sunday Before Winter	
1984	David McFadden	The Art of Darkness	
1984	Sharon Thesen	Confabulations	
1984	Peter van Toorn	Mountain Tea	
1985	Fred Wah	Waiting for Saskatchewan	
1985	Lorna Crozier	The Garden Going on Without Us	
1985	Richard Lush	A Manual for Lying Down	
1985	Anne Szumigalski	Instar	
1986	Al Purdy	The Collected Poems of Al Purdy	
1986	Christopher Dewdney	The Immaculate Perception	
1986	John Newlove	The Night the Dog Smiled	
1987	Gwendolyn MacEwen	Afterworlds	
1987	Di Brandt	Questions I Asked My Mother	
1987	Roy Kiyooka	Pear Tree Pomes	
1987	Sharon Thesen	The Beginning of the Long Dash	
1988	Erín Moure	Furious	
1988	Lorna Crozier	Angels of Flesh, Angels of Silence	
1988	Christopher Dewdney	Radiant Inventory	
1988	David McFadden	Gypsy Guitar	
1988	Peter Dale Scott	Coming to Jakarta	
1989	Heather Spears	The Word for Sand	
1989	Tim Lilburn	Tourist to Ecstasy	
1989	Stephen Scobie	Dunino	

=== 1990s ===
Year	Author	Title	Ref.
1990	Margaret Avison	No Time	
1990	Dionne Brand	No Language Is Neutral	
1990	Patrick Lane	Winter	
1991	Don McKay	Night Field	
1991	Don Domanski	Wolf-Ladder	
1991	Judith Fitzgerald	Rapturous Chronicles	
1991	Patrick Lane	Mortal Remains	
1991	Anne Michaels	Miner's Pond	
1992	Lorna Crozier	Inventing the Hawk	
1992	Evelyn Lau	Oedipal Dreams	
1992	Laura Lush	Hometown	
1992	Steve McCaffery	Theory of Sediment	
1992	Kathleen McCracken	Blue Light, Bay and College	
1993	Don Coles	Forests of the Medieval World	
1993	Claire Harris	Drawing Down a Daughter	
1993	Monty Reid	Crawlspace: New and Selected Poems	
1993	Douglas Burnet Smith	Voices from a Farther Room	
1993	Patricia Young	More Watery Still	
1994	Robert Hilles	Cantos from a Small Room	
1994	Robin Blaser	The Holy Forest	
1994	Polly Fleck	The Chinese Execution	
1994	Monty Reid	Dog Sleeps	
1995	Anne Szumigalski	Voice	
1995	Roo Borson	Night Walk	
1995	Di Brandt	Jerusalem, Beloved	
1995	Don Domanski	Stations of the Left Hand	
1995	Steven Heighton	The Ecstasy of Skeptics	
1996	E. D. Blodgett	Apostrophes: Woman at a Piano	
1996	Elizabeth Brewster	Footnotes to the Book of Job	
1996	Crispin Elsted	Climate and the Affections	
1996	Charles Lillard	Shadow Weather	
1996	Erín Moure	Search Procedures	
1997	Dionne Brand	Land to Light On	
1997	Marilyn Bowering	Autobiography	
1997	Patrick Friesen	A Broken Bowl	
1997	Carole Glasser Langille	In Cannon Cave	
1997	Don McKay	Apparatus	
1998	Stephanie Bolster	White Stone: The Alice Poems	
1998	Louise Bernice Halfe	Blue Marrow	
1998	Michael Ondaatje	Handwriting	
1998	Lisa Robertson	Debbie: An Epic	
1998	Kathy Shaidle	Lobotomy Magnificat	
1999	Jan Zwicky	Songs for Relinquishing the Earth	
1999	Lynn Davies	The Bridge that Carries the Road	
1999	Susan Goyette	The True Names of Birds	
1999	Richard Harrison	Big Breath of a Wish	
1999	Terence Young	The Island in Winter	

=== 2000s ===
Year	Author	Title	Ref.
2000	Don McKay	Another Gravity	
2000	George Bowering	His Life	
2000	A. F. Moritz	Rest on the Flight into Egypt	
2000	John Pass	Water Stair	
2000	Patricia Young	Ruin and Beauty	
2001	George Elliott Clarke	Execution Poems	
2001	Anne Carson	Men in the Off Hours	
2001	Phil Hall	Trouble Sleeping	
2001	Robert Kroetsch	The Hornbooks of Rita K.	
2001	Steve McCaffery	Seven Pages Missing	
2002	Roy Miki	Surrender	
2002	Tammy Armstrong	Bogman's Music	
2002	Colin Browne	Ground Water	
2002	Kathy Mac	Nail Builders Plan for Strength and Growth	
2002	Erín Moure	O Cidadán	
2003	Tim Lilburn	Kill-site	
2003	Tim Bowling	The Witness Ghost	
2003	Evan Jones	Nothing Fell Today But Rain	
2003	Anne Simpson	Loop	
2003	Tom Wayman	My Father's Cup	
2004	Roo Borson	Short Journey Upriver Toward Oishida	
2004	Tim Bowling	The Memory Orchard	
2004	David Manicom	The Burning Eaves	
2004	John Terpstra	Disarmament	
2004	Jan Zwicky	Robinson's Crossing	
2005	Anne Compton	processional	
2005	Barry Dempster	The Burning Alphabet	
2005	Erín Moure	Little Theatres	
2005	W. H. New	Underwood Log	
2005	Olive Senior	Over the Roofs of the World	
2006	John Pass	Stumbling in the Bloom	
2006	Ken Babstock	Airstream Land Yacht	
2006	Elizabeth Bachinsky	Home of Sudden Service	
2006	Dionne Brand	Inventory	
2006	Sharon Thesen	The Good Bacteria	
2007	Don Domanski	All Our Wonder Unavenged	
2007	Margaret Atwood	The Door	
2007	Brian Henderson	Nerve Language	
2007	Dennis Lee	Yesno	
2007	Rob Winger	Muybridge's Horse	
2008	Jacob Scheier	More to Keep Us Warm	
2008	Weyman Chan	Noise from the Laundry	
2008	A. F. Moritz	The Sentinel	
2008	Sachiko Murakami	The Invisibility Exhibit	
2008	Ruth Roach Pierson	Aide-Mémoire	
2009	David Zieroth	The Fly in Autumn	
2009	David McFadden	Be Calm, Honey	
2009	Philip Kevin Paul	Little Hunger	
2009	Sina Queyras	Expressway	
2009	Carmine Starnino	This Way Out	

=== 2010s ===
Year	Author	Title	Ref.
2010	Richard Greene	Boxing the Compass	
2010	Michael Harris	Circus	
2010	Daryl Hine	&: A Serial Poem	
2010	Sandy Pool	Exploding into Night	
2010	Melanie Siebert	Deepwater Vee	
2011	Phil Hall	Killdeer	
2011	Michael Boughn	Cosmographia: A Post-Lucretian Faux Micro-Epic	
2011	Kate Eichhorn	Fieldnotes, A Forensic	
2011	Garry Thomas Morse	Discovery Passages	
2011	Susan Musgrave	Origami Dove	
2012	Julie Bruck	Monkey Ranch	
2012	David McGimpsey	Li'l Bastard	
2012	A. F. Moritz	The New Measures	
2012	Lisa Pasold	Any Bright Horse	
2012	James Pollock	Sailing to Babylon	
2013	Katherena Vermette	North End Love Songs	
2013	Austin Clarke	Where the Sun Shines Best	
2013	Adam Dickinson	The Polymers	
2013	Don Domanski	Bite Down Little Whisper	
2013	Russell Thornton	Birds, Metal, Stones & Rain	
2014	Arleen Paré	Lake of Two Mountains	
2014	Julie Joosten	Light Light	
2014	Christopher Levenson	Night Vision	
2014	Garth Martens	Prologue for the Age of Consequence	
2014	Sadiqa de Meijer	Leaving Howe Island	
2015	Robyn Sarah	My Shoes Are Killing Me	
2015	Kayla Czaga	For Your Safety Please Hold On	
2015	Liz Howard	Infinite Citizen of the Shaking Tent	
2015	M. Travis Lane	Crossover	
2015	Patrick Lane	Washita	
2016	Steven Heighton	The Waking Comes Late	
2016	Joe Denham	Regeneration Machine	
2016	Susan Holbrook	Throaty Wipes	
2016	Garry Thomas Morse	Prairie Harbour	
2016	Rachel Rose	Marry & Burn	
2017	Richard Harrison	On Not Losing My Father's Ashes in the Flood	
2017	Lorna Crozier	What the Soul Doesn't Want	
2017	Nora Gould	Selah	
2017	Benjamin Hertwig	Slow War	
2017	Julia McCarthy	All the Names Between	
2018	Cecily Nicholson	Wayside Sang	
2018	Billy-Ray Belcourt	This Wound Is a World	
2018	Dionne Brand	The Blue Clerk	
2018	Joshua Mensch	Because: A Lyric Memoir	
2018	Jason Stefanik	Night Became Years	
2019	Gwen Benaway	Holy Wild	
2019	Julie Bruck	How to Avoid Huge Ships	
2019	Karen Houle	The Grand River Watershed: A Folk Ecology	
2019	Catherine Hunter	St. Boniface Elegies	
2019	Armand Garnet Ruffo	Treaty #	

=== 2020s ===
Year	Author	Title	Ref
2020	Anne Carson	Norma Jeane Baker of Troy	
2020	Oana Avasilichioaei	Eight Track	
2020	Donna Kane	Orrery	
2020	Canisia Lubrin	The Dyzgraphxst	
2020	Sachiko Murakami	Render	
2021	Tolu Oloruntoba	The Junta of Happenstance	
2021	Roxanna Bennett	The Untranslatable I	
2021	Stephen Collis	A History of the Theories of Rain	
2021	Hoa Nguyen	A Thousand Times You Lose Your Treasure	
2021	Rebecca Salazar	Sulphurtongue	
2022	Annick MacAskill	Shadow Blight	
2022	D. M. Bradford	Dream of No One But Myself	
2022	Anne Carson	H of H Playbook	
2022	Aaron Kreuter	Shifting Baseline Syndrome	
2022	Avery Lake	Horrible Dance	
2023	Hannah Green	Xanax Cowboy	
2023	Robert Bringhurst	The Ridge	
2023	Conor Kerr	Old Gods	
2023	Amy Ching-Yan Lam	Baby Book	
2023	Susan Musgrave	Exculpatory Lilies	
2024	Chimwemwe Undi	Scientific Marvel	
2024	Brandi Bird	The All + Flesh	
2024	Bradley Peters	Sonnets from a Cell	
2024	Bren Simmers	The Work	
2024	Barbara Tran	Precedented Parroting	
2025	Karen Solie	Wellwater	
2025	Farah Ghafoor	Shadow Price	
2025	Lorna Goodison	Dante’s Inferno: A new translation	
2025	Michael Trussler	10:10	
2025	Douglas Walbourne-Gough	Island	
2026	Gillian Sze	An Orange, a Syllable	
2026	Brandi Bird	Pitiful	
2026	Kaie Kellough	Interposition	
2026	Canisia Lubrin	The World After Rain	
2026	Julie Roorda	Castastrophilia	
