= 2016 in poetry =

Nationality words link to articles with information on the nation's poetry or literature (for instance, Irish or France).

== Events ==
- January 14 – Egyptian poet Omar Hazek, who was released from prison in September 2015, is prevented from leaving Egypt to receive the 2016 Oxfam Novib/PEN Award for Freedom of Expression.
- January 26 – Egyptian poet Fatima Naoot is sentenced to three years in prison, found guilty of "contempt of religion." Naoot goes to prison immediately and must appeal from there.
- American poets Hawona Sullivan Janzen and Clarence White participate in public art project Rondo Family Reunion in Saint Paul, Minnesota.

== Anniversaries ==
- January 25 – the 125th birthday of Osip Mandelstam.
- March 5 – semicentenary of the death of Anna Akhmatova, Russian poet (Requiem)
- March 27 – 90th birthday of Frank O'Hara. (See July 25)
- April 24 – centenary of the start of the Easter Rising in Dublin, which inspired W. B. Yeats’s poem "Easter, 1916".
- May 21 – 90th birthday of Robert Creeley (d. 2005).
- June 7 – semicentenary of the death of Jean Arp, French sculptor, painter and poet, leader in Dadaism
- July 11 – semicentenary of the death of Delmore Schwartz, American poet, Bollingen Prize winner and short story writer ("In Dreams Begin Responsibilities")
- July 25 – semicentenary of the death of Frank O'Hara, American poet and key member of the New York School of poetry. (See March 27)
- August 29 – semicentenary of the death of Melvin Tolson, American poet Modernist poet, educator, columnist, and politician
- September 25 – semicentenary of the death of Mina Loy, British-born American artist, poet, Futurist and actor
- September 28 – semicentenary of the death of André Breton, French poet, essayist and theorist; the leading exponent of Surrealism in literature

== Selection of works published in English ==
=== Australia ===
- Brook Emery, Have Been and Are, Gloria SMH Press. ISBN 978-0-9945-2753-0

==== Anthologies in Australia ====
- Disney, Dan & Kelen, Kit (eds.) (2016), Writing to the Wire, UWA Publishing. ISBN 978-1-7425-8866-7

=== Canada ===
- Gwen Benaway, Passage
- Joe Denham, Regeneration Machine
- Steven Heighton, The Waking Comes Late
- Susan Holbrook, Throaty Wipes
- Garry Thomas Morse, Prairie Harbour
- Rachel Rose, Marry & Burn
- Gregory Scofield, Witness, I Am

=== India ===
- Sudeep Sen, Erotext, Penguin Books, ISBN 978-93-858905-8-1

=== New Zealand ===
- Tusiata Avia, Fale Aiutu – Spirit House, Victoria University Press, ISBN 9781776560646

==== Poets in Best New Zealand Poems ====
These poets wrote the 25 poems selected for Best New Zealand Poems 2015 - guest editor was John Newton, published this year:

- Morgan Bach
- Serie Barford
- Sarah Jane Barnett
- David Beach
- Hera Lindsay Bird
- Wystan Curnow
- John Dennison
- Belinda Diepenheim
- Murray Edmond
- Joan Fleming
- Bernadette Hall
- Dinah Hawken
- Alexandra Hollis
- Brent Kininmont
- Iain Lonie
- Selina Tusitala Marsh
- Frankie McMillan
- Gregory O'Brien
- Vincent O'Sullivan
- Frances Samuel
- kani te manukura
- Steven Toussaint
- Bryan Walpert
- Alison Wong
- Ashleigh Young

=== United Kingdom ===
==== England ====
- Jay Bernard, The Red and Yellow Nothing
- Emily Berry, Anne Carson and Sophie Collins, If I'm Scared We Can't Win (Penguin Modern Poets)
- Brian Bilston, You Took the Last Bus Home
- Rachael Boast, Void Studies
- Vahni Capildeo, Measures of Expatriation (Trinidad-born poet)
- Melissa Lee-Houghton, Sunshine
- Hollie McNish, Nobody Told Me
- Alice Oswald, Falling Awake
- Ruth Padel, Tidings – A Christmas Journey
- Denise Riley, Say Something Back
- Kae Tempest, Let Them Eat Chaos
- Rebecca Watts, The Met Office Advises Caution

==== Scotland ====
- Michel Faber, Undying: a love story (Dutch-born writer)

==== Anthologies in the United Kingdom ====
- Carol Ann Duffy and Gillian Clarke, The Map and the Clock: A Laureates' Choice of the Poetry of Britain and Ireland

=== United States ===
Alphabetical listing by author name

- Jos Charles, Safe Space (Ahsahta Press)
- Matthew and Michael Dickman, Brother (Faber)
- Tyehimba Jess, Olio
- Ben Lerner, No Art (collection incorporating three previous volumes)
- Amanda Lovelace, The Princess Saves Herself in This One
- Michael Palmer, The Laughter of the Sphinx (New Directions)
- Ocean Vuong, Night Sky With Exit Wounds (Copper Canyon Press)
- C. D. Wright. ShallCross (Copper Canyon Press)

==== Criticism, scholarship and biography in the United States ====
- J.D. McClatchy. Sweet Theft: A Poet's Commonplace Book
- C. D. Wright. The Poet, The Lion, Talking Pictures, El Farolito, A Wedding in St. Roch, The Big Box Store, The Warp in the Mirror, Spring, Midnights, Fire & All (Copper Canyon Press)

== Works published in other languages ==
=== German ===
- Antony Theodore, Du bist die Seele meins Seins (Ventura Verlag), ISBN 978-39-408533-9-4

== Awards and honors by country ==
Awards announced this year:

=== International ===
- Struga Poetry Evenings Golden Wreath Laureate : Margaret Atwood

=== Australia awards and honors ===
- C. J. Dennis Prize for Poetry:
- Kenneth Slessor Prize for Poetry:

=== Canada awards and honors ===
- Archibald Lampman Award: Pearl Pirie, the pet radish, shrunken
- Atlantic Poetry Prize: Susan Goyette, The Brief Reincarnation of a Girl
- 2016 Governor General's Awards: Steven Heighton, The Waking Comes Late (English); Normand de Bellefeuille, Le poème est une maison de bord de mer (French)
- Griffin Poetry Prize:
  - Canada: Liz Howard, Infinite Citizen of the Shaking Tent
  - International: Norman Dubie, The Quotations of Bone
  - Lifetime Recognition Award (presented by the Griffin trustees): Adam Zagajewski.
- Latner Writers' Trust Poetry Prize: Gregory Scofield
- Gerald Lampert Award: Ben Ladouceur, Otter
- Pat Lowther Award: Lorna Crozier, The Wrong Cat
- Prix Alain-Grandbois: Rosalie Lessard, L'observatoire
- Raymond Souster Award: Lorna Crozier, The Wrong Cat
- Dorothy Livesay Poetry Prize: Raoul Fernandes, Transmitter and Receiver
- Prix Émile-Nelligan: Jonathan Lamy, La vie sauve

=== France awards and honors ===
- Prix Goncourt de la Poésie:

=== India awards and honors ===
- Sahitya Akademi Award : Papineni Sivasankar for Rajanigandha (Telugu)
- Jnanpith Award : Shankha Ghosh

=== New Zealand awards and honors ===
- Prime Minister's Awards for Literary Achievement:
- Montana New Zealand Book Awards (poetry category):

=== United Kingdom awards and honors ===
- Cholmondeley Award: Maura Dooley, David Morley, Peter Sansom, Iain Sinclair
- Costa Award (formerly "Whitbread Awards") for poetry:
  - Shortlist: Melissa Lee-Houghton, Sunshine; Alice Oswald, Falling Awake; Denise Riley, Say Something Back; Kae Tempest, Let Them Eat Chaos
- English Association's Fellows' Poetry Prizes:
- Eric Gregory Award (for a collection of poems by a poet under the age of 30):
- Forward Poetry Prize:
  - Best Collection:
    - Shortlist: Vahni Capildeo, Measures of Expatriation
  - Best First Collection:
    - Shortlist: Tiphanie Yanique, Wife
  - Best Poem:
    - Shortlist:
- Jerwood Aldeburgh First Collection Prize for poetry:
  - Shortlist:
- Manchester Poetry Prize:
- National Poet of Wales:
- National Poetry Competition : Stephen Sexton for The Curfew
- T. S. Eliot Prize (United Kingdom and Ireland): Jacob Polley, Jackself
  - Shortlist (announced in November 2016): 2016 Short List
- The Times / Stephen Spender Prize for Poetry Translation:
- Wilfred Owen Poetry Award: Carol Ann Duffy

=== United States awards and honors ===
- Arab American Book Award (The George Ellenbogen Poetry Award):
  - Honorable Mentions:
- Agnes Lynch Starrett Poetry Prize: Erin Adair-Hodges for Let's All Die Happy
- Anisfield-Wolf Book Award:
- Best Translated Book Award (BTBA):
- Beatrice Hawley Award from Alice James Books:
- Dwarf Stars Award: Stacy Balkun for We Begin This Way
- Elgin Award:
  - Mary Soon Lee for Crowned: The Sign Of The Dragon Book 1 (Book)
  - Shannon Connor Winward for Undoing Winter
- Jackson Poetry Prize: Will Alexander (poet)
  - Judges: Elizabeth Alexander, Rae Armantrout, and Terrance Hayes
- Lambda Literary Award:
  - Gay Poetry:
  - Lesbian Poetry:
- Lenore Marshall Poetry Prize:
- Los Angeles Times Book Prize:
  - Finalists:
- National Book Award for Poetry (NBA):
  - NBA Finalists:
  - NBA Longlist:
  - NBA Judges:
- National Book Critics Circle Award for Poetry:
- The New Criterion Poetry Prize:
- Pulitzer Prize for Poetry (United States): to Ozone Journal by Peter Balakian
  - Finalists: to Four-Legged Girl by Diane Seuss; and to Alive: New and Selected Poems by Elizabeth Willis
- Wallace Stevens Award:
- Whiting Awards:
- PEN Award for Poetry in Translation:
- PEN Center USA 2016 Poetry Award:
- PEN/Voelcker Award for Poetry: (Judges: )
- Raiziss/de Palchi Translation Award:
- Rhysling Award:
  - Krysada Panusith Phounsiri for It Begins With A Haunting
    Ann K. Schwader for Keziah (tie) - Long Form
  - Ruth Berman for Time Travel Vocabulary Problems - Short Form
- Ruth Lilly Poetry Prize:
- Kingsley Tufts Poetry Award:
- Walt Whitman Prize – – Judge:
- Yale Younger Series:

==== From the Poetry Society of America ====
- Frost Medal:
- Shelley Memorial Award:
- Writer Magazine/Emily Dickinson Award:
- Lyric Poetry Award:
- Alice Fay Di Castagnola Award:
- Louise Louis/Emily F. Bourne Student Poetry Award:
- George Bogin Memorial Award:
- Robert H. Winner Memorial Award:
- Cecil Hemley Memorial Award:
- Norma Farber First Book Award:
- Lucille Medwick Memorial Award:
- William Carlos Williams Award: (Judge: )
  - Finalists for WCW Award:

== Deaths ==
=== January – June ===
Birth years link to the corresponding "[year] in poetry" article:

- January 1 – Fazu Aliyeva, 83 (born 1932), Russian Avar poet and journalist
- January 6 – Nivaria Tejera, 86 (born 1929), Cuban poet and novelist
- January 9 – Zelimkhan Yaqub, 66 (born 1950), Azerbaijani poet
- January 12 – C. D. Wright, 67 (born 1949), American poet who was the former poet laureate of Rhode Island and winner of the 2009 International Griffin Poetry Prize
- January 15 – Francisco X. Alarcón, 61 (born 1954), Chicano-American poet who was born in California and grew up in Guadalajara, Mexico
- January 19 – Laurence Lerner, 90 (born 1925), South African-born English-language poet and academic
- February 7 – Andrew Glaze, 90 (born 1920), American poet appointed 11th Poet Laureate of Alabama in 2013
- February 8 – Nida Fazli, 77 (born 1938), Indian poet and lyricist
- February 21 – Akbar Ali, 90 (born 1925), Indian Kannada poet
  - Miroslav Nemirov, 54 (born 1961), Russian poet
- March 5 – Rafael Squirru, 90 (born 1925), Argentine author, art critic and poet
- April 13 – Jock Scot, 63 (born 1952), Scottish performance poet
- April 30 – Daniel Berrigan, 94 (born 1921), American Jesuit priest, poet, peace activist and recidivist (one of Catonsville Nine); winner of Lamont Prize for his book of poems Time Without Number
- June 4 – Alexander Glezer, 82, Russian poet.
- June 16 – Bill Berkson, 76, American poet and art critic, heart attack.
- June 25 – Adam Small, 79, South African writer and poet, winner of the Hertzog Prize. (born 1936).
- June 30 – Sir Geoffrey Hill, 84, English poet

=== July – December ===
- July 1 – Yves Bonnefoy, 93, French poet, essayist, translator, and critic (born 1923)
- September 3 – Peter Oresick, 60, American poet (born 1955)
- September 4 – Novella Matveyeva, 81, Russian poet and singer-songwriter (born 1934)
- October 14 – Brigit Pegeen Kelly, American poet (born 1951)
- October 28 – Jolanda Insana, 79, Italian poet and translator, Viareggio Prize recipient
- December 27 – Anthony Cronin, 92, Irish poet (born 1928)
- December 30 – Judith Ortiz Cofer, 64, Puerto Rican American poet and educator
- December 31 – David Meltzer, 79, American poet and musician

== See also ==
- Poetry
- List of years in poetry
- List of poetry awards
