= Dorothy Livesay Poetry Prize =

Canadian literary award

The Dorothy Livesay Poetry Prize, established in 1986, is awarded annually to the best collection of poetry by a resident of British Columbia, Canada.

One of the BC and Yukon Book Prizes, the award was originally known as the B.C. Prize for Poetry. In 1989, it was renamed after poet Dorothy Livesay, whose Day and Night (1944) and Poems for People (1947) received the Governor General's Award for Poetry

== Recipients ==
Prize winners and finalists
Year	Author	Title	Result	Ref.
1986	Joe Rosenblatt	Poetry Hotel	Winner	
1986	Anne Marriott	Letters for Some Islands	Shortlist	
1986	P. K. Page	The Glass Air	Shortlist	
1987	Diana Hartog	Candy from Strangers	Winner	
1987	John Newlove	The Night the Dog Smiled	Shortlist	
1987	Tom Wayman	The Face of Jack Munro	Shortlist	
1988	Patricia Young	All I Ever Needed was a Beautiful Room	Winner	
1988	Norm Sibum	Eight Poems	Shortlist	
1988	Sharon Thesen	The Beginning of the Long Dash	Shortlist	
1989	Charles Lillard	Circling North	Winner	
1989	Doug Beardsley	Dancing Star	Shortlist	
1989	bill bissett	what we have	Shortlist	
1990	Victoria Walker	Suitcase	Winner	
1990	Marlene Cookshaw	The Whole Elephant	Shortlist	
1990	Maureen McCarthy	The Girls in the Last Seat Waving	Shortlist	
1991	Jeff Derksen	Down Time	Winner	
1991	bill bissett	Hard 2 beleev	Shortlist	
1991	Phyllis Webb	Hanging Fire	Shortlist	
1992	Barry McKinnon	Pulplog	Winner	
1992	John Pass	The Hour's Acropolis	Shortlist	
1992	Michael Turner	Company Town	Shortlist	
1993	bill bissett	Inkorrect Thots	Winner	
1993	Kirsten Emmott	How Do You Feel?	Shortlist	
1993	Diana Hartog	Polite to Bees: A Bestiary	Shortlist	
1994	Gregory Scofield	The Gathering: Stones for the Medicine Wheel	Winner	
1994	Brian Brett	Poems New and Selected	Shortlist	
1994	Howard White	Ghost in the Gears	Shortlist	
1995	Linda Rogers	Hard Candy	Winner	
1995	Aaron Bushkowsky	Ed and Mabel Go to the Moon	Shortlist	
1995	Adeena Karasick	Mêmewars	Shortlist	
1996	Patrick Lane	Too Spare, Too Fierce	Winner	
1996	Kate Braid	To this Cedar Fountain	Shortlist	
1996	Robin Skelton	The Edge of Time	Shortlist	
1997	Margo Button	The Unhinging of Wings	Winner	
1997	Marilyn Bowering	Autobiography	Shortlist	
1997	Joyce Nelson	Seeing in the Dark	Shortlist	
1998	Patricia Young	What I Remember from My Time on Earth	Winner	
1998	Lyle Neff	Ivanhoe Station	Shortlist	
1998	Linda Rogers	Heaven Cake	Shortlist	
1999	David Zieroth	How I Joined Humanity at Last	Winner	
1999	Patrick Friesen	St. Mary at Main	Shortlist	
1999	Jan Zwicky	Songs for Relinquishing the Earth	Shortlist	
2000	Lorna Crozier	What the Living Won't Let Go	Winner	
2000	Wayde Compton	49th Parallel Psalm	Shortlist	
2000	Susan Musgrave	Things That Keep and Do Not Change	Shortlist	
2000	D. C. Reid	Love and Other Things That Hurt	Shortlist	
2000	Tom Wayman	The Colours of the Forest	Shortlist	
2001	Don McKay	Another Gravity	Winner	
2001	George Bowering	His Life	Shortlist	
2001	Patrick Lane	The Bare Plum of Winter Rain	Shortlist	
2001	John Pass	Water Stair	Shortlist	
2001	Sue Wheeler	Slow-Moving Target	Shortlist	
2002	Karen Solie	Short Haul Engine	Winner	
2002	Stephen Guppy	Understanding Heaven	Shortlist	
2002	Aislinn Hunter	Into the Early Hours	Shortlist	
2002	Daphne Marlatt	This Tremor Love Is	Shortlist	
2002	Catherine Owen	The Wrecks of Eden	Shortlist	
2003	bill bissett	peter among th towring boxes / text bites	Winner	
2003	Colin Browne	Ground Water	Shortlist	
2003	Marlene Cookshaw	Shameless	Shortlist	
2003	Patrick Friesen	The Breath You Take from the Lord	Shortlist	
2003	Tom Wayman	My Father's Cup	Shortlist	
2004	Philip Kevin Paul	Taking the Names Down from the Hill	Winner	
2004	Marilyn Bowering	The Alchemy of Happiness	Shortlist	
2004	Robert Bringhurst	Ursa Major	Shortlist	
2004	Denise Cammiade	The Creature I Am	Shortlist	
2004	Russell Thornton	House Built of Rain	Shortlist	
2005	Jan Zwicky	Robinson's Crossing	Winner	
2005	Aislinn Hunter	The Possible Past	Shortlist	
2005	Eve Joseph	The Startled Heart	Shortlist	
2005	Patrick Lane	Go Leaving	Shortlist	
2005	D. C. Reid	The Hunger	Shortlist	
2006	Meredith Quartermain	Vancouver Walking	Winner	
2006	Stephen Collis	Anarchive	Shortlist	
2006	Jordan Scott	Silt	Shortlist	
2006	George Sipos	Anything But the Moon	Shortlist	
2006	Jan Zwicky	Thirty-seven Small Songs & Thirteen Silences	Shortlist	
2007	Don McKay	Strike / Slip	Winner	
2007	Maxine Gadd	Backup to Babylon	Shortlist	
2007	Steven Price	Anatomy of Keys	Shortlist	
2007	Sharon Thesen	The Good Bacteria	Shortlist	
2007	Terence Young	Moving Day	Shortlist	
2008	Rita Wong	Forage	Winner	
2008	George McWhirter	The Incorrection	Shortlist	
2008	Arleen Paré	Paper Trail	Shortlist	
2008	Christopher Patton	Ox	Shortlist	
2008	Gillian Wigmore	Soft Geography	Shortlist	
2009	Daphne Marlatt	The Given	Winner	
2009	Karen Hofmann	Water Strider	Shortlist	
2009	Elise Partridge	Chameleon Hours	Shortlist	
2009	Nilofar Shidmehr	Shirin and Salt Man	Shortlist	
2009	George Stanley	Vancouver: A Poem	Shortlist	
2010	Fred Wah	Is a Door	Winner	
2010	Gillian Jerome	Red Nest	Shortlist	
2010	Larissa Lai	Automaton Biographies	Shortlist	
2010	Miranda Pearson	Harbour	Shortlist	
2010	David Zieroth	The Fly in Autumn	Shortlist	
2011	Stephen Collis	On the Material	Winner	
2011	Ken Belford	Decompositions	Shortlist	
2011	George Bowering	My Darling Nellie Grey	Shortlist	
2011	Jen Currin	The Inquisition Yours	Shortlist	
2011	Eve Joseph	The Secret Signature of Things	Shortlist	
2012	John Pass	Crawlspace	Winner	
2012	Patrick Lane	The Collected Poems of Patrick Lane	Shortlist	
2012	Susan McCaslin	Demeter Goes Skydiving	Shortlist	
2012	Garry Thomas Morse	Discovery Passages	Shortlist	
2012	Sharon Thesen	Oyama Pink Shale	Shortlist	
2013	Sarah de Leeuw	Geographies of a Lover	Winner	
2013	Colin Browne	The Properties	Shortlist	
2013	Roger Farr	IKMQ	Shortlist	
2013	Evelyn Lau	A Grain of Rice	Shortlist	
2013	Patricia Young	Night-Eater	Shortlist	
2014	Jordan Abel	The Place of Scraps	Winner	
2014	Catherine Greenwood	The Lost Letters	Shortlist	
2014	Jennica Harper	Wood	Shortlist	
2014	Renée Sarojini Saklikar	children of air india: un/authorized exhibits and interjections	Shortlist	
2014	Russell Thornton	Birds, Metals, Stones and Raina	Shortlist	
2015	Cecily Nicholson	From the Poplars	Winner	
2015	Robert Budde	Dreamland Theatre	Shortlist	
2015	Jen Currin	School	Shortlist	
2015	Kayla Czaga	For Your Safety Please Hold On	Shortlist	
2015	Patrick Lane	Washita	Shortlist	
2016	Raoul Fernandes	Transmitter and Receiver	Winner	
2016	Ali Blythe	Twoism	Shortlist	
2016	Amber Dawn	Where the words end and my body begins	Shortlist	
2016	Miranda Pearson	The Fire Extinguisher	Shortlist	
2016	Jeff Steudel	Foreign Park	Shortlist	
2017	Adèle Barclay	If I Were in a Cage I’d Reach Out for You	Winner	
2017	Anne Fleming	poemw	Shortlist	
2017	Otoniya J. Okot Bitek	100 Days		
2017	Rob Taylor	The News	Shortlist	
2017	Richard Therrien	Sleeping in Tall Grass	Shortlist	
2018	Mercedes Eng	Prison Industrial Complex Explodes	Winner	
2018	Rhonda Ganz	Frequent, small loads of laundry	Shortlist	
2018	Jónína Kirton	An Honest Woman	Shortlist	
2018	Julie Paul	The Rules of the Kingdom	Shortlist	
2018	Onjana Yawnghwe	Fragments, Desire	Shortlist	
2019	Laisha Rosnau	Our Familiar Hunger	Winner	
2019	Eve Joseph	Quarrels	Shortlist	
2019	Shazia Hafiz Ramji	Port of Being	Shortlist	
2019	Fred Wah and Rita Wong	beholden, a poem as long as the river	Shortlist	
2019	Onjana Yawnghwe	The Small Way	Shortlist	
2020	Chantal Gibson	How She Read	Winner	
2020	Ali Blythe	Hymnswitch	Shortlist	
2020	Kayla Czaga	Dunk Tank	Shortlist	
2020	Joseph A. Dandurand	SH:LAM (The Doctor)	Shortlist	
2020	Sonnet L’Abbé	Sonnet's Shakespeare	Shortlist	
2021	Michael Prior	Burning Province	Winner	
2021	Joseph A. Dandurand	The East Side of It All	Shortlist	
2021	Junie Désil	eat salt | gaze at the ocean	Shortlist	
2021	Valerie Mason-John	I Am Still Your Negro: An Homage to James Baldwin	Shortlist	
2021	Fred Wah	Music at the Heart of Thinking: Improvisations 1-170	Shortlist	
2022	Henry Doyle	No Shelter	Winner	
2022	Jenny Boychuk	Antonyms for Daughter	Shortlist	
2022	shauna paull	blue gait	Shortlist	
2022	Matt Rader	Ghosthawk	Shortlist	
2022	Isabella Wang	Pebble Swing	Shortlist	
2023	Otoniya J. Okot Bitek	A is for Acholi	Winner	
2023	Megan Fennya Jones	The Program	Shortlist	
2023	Cecily Nicholson	HARROWINGS	Shortlist	
2023	Tolu Oloruntoba	Each One a Furnace	Shortlist	
2023	Sheryda Warrener	Test Piece	Shortlist	
2024	Jess Housty	Crushed Wild Mint	Winner	
2024	Dominique Bernier-Cormier	Entre Rive and Shore	Shortlist	
2024	Samantha Nock	A Family of Dreamers	Shortlist	
2024	Bradley Peters	Sonnets from a Cell	Shortlist	
2024	Cathy Stonehouse	Dream House	Shortlist	
2025	Leanne Dunic	wet	Winner	
2025	Kayla Czaga	Midway	Shortlist	
2025	Dallas Hunt	Teeth	Shortlist	
2025	Zehra Naqvi	The Knot of My Tongue	Shortlist	
2025	Shō Yamagushiku	shima	Shortlist	
2026	Amber Dawn	Buzzkill Clamshell	Winner	
2026	Lorna Goodison	The Inferno	Shortlist	
2026	Joseph Kidney	Devotional Forensics	Shortlist	
2026	Rahat Kurd	The Book of Z	Shortlist	
2026	Bruce McRae	Boxing in the Bone	Shortlist	

== See also ==
- Canadian poetry
- List of poetry awards
- List of years in poetry
- List of years in literature
