= 1983 in poetry =

Nationality words link to articles with information on the nation's poetry or literature (for instance, Irish or France).

== Events ==
- April – Russian samizdat poet Irina Ratushinskaya is sentenced to imprisonment in a labor camp for dissident activity; she continues to write poetry clandestinely in prison.
- June 2 – Francophone Senegalese poet and politician Léopold Sédar Senghor becomes the first black African writer elected as a member of the Académie française
- The Frogmore Press is founded by Andre Evans and Jeremy Page at the Frogmore tea-rooms in Folkestone, England. The press publishes a magazine, The Frogmire Papers.

== Works published in English ==
Listed by nation where the work was first published and again by the poet's native land, if different; substantially revised works listed separately:

=== Australia ===
- David Brooks, The Cold Front. Sydney: Hale & Iremonger
- Les Murray, The People's Otherworld, winner of the 1984 Kenneth Slessor Prize for Poetry
- Philip Salom: The Projectionist, A Sequence. (Fremantle Arts Centre) ISBN 978-0-909144-69-2
- John Tranter, Selected Poems, Hale & Iremonger

=== Canada ===
- Dionne Brand, Winter Epigrams and Epigrams to Ernesto Cardenal in Defense of Claudia
- George Elliott Clarke, Saltwater Spirituals and Deeper Blues, Lawrencetown Beach, Nova Scotia: Pottersfield, ISBN 0-919001-12-2
- Robert Finch, The Grand Duke of Moscow's Favourite Solo.
- Irving Layton, The Gucci Bag. Oakville, Ontario: Mosaic Press. Toronto: McClelland and Stewart.
- Dorothy Livesay, The Phases of Love. Toronto: Coach House.
- Don McKay, Birding, or Desire
- George McWhirter, Fire Before Dark
- Roy Miki, The Prepoetics of William Carlos Williams (critical study)
- Joe Rosenblatt, The Sleeping Lady. Exile Editions.
- Raymond Souster, Going the Distance. Ottawa: Oberon Press.
- George Woodcock, Collected Poems, Victoria: Sono Nis Press, Canada

=== India, in English ===
- Jayanta Mahapatra, Life Signs ( Poetry in English ), New Delhi: Oxford University Press
- Dom Moraes, Absences ( Poetry in English ),
- Sudeep Sen, Leaning Against the Lamp-Post ( Poetry in English ),

=== Ireland ===
- Sebastian Barry, The Water-Colourist, Ireland
- Padraic Fallon, Poems and Versions (see also Poems 1974 in poetry, Collected Poems1990 in poetry)
- Seamus Heaney, Northern Ireland native living at this time in the United States:
  - An Open Letter, Field Day
  - Translator, Sweeney Astray: A version from the Irish, Field Day
- Paul Muldoon, Quoof, Northern Ireland native published in the United Kingdom
- Tom Paulin, Liberty Tree, including "Desertmartin", "Off the Back of a Lorry" and "A Written Answer", Faber and Faber, Irish poet published in the United Kingdom

=== New Zealand ===
- Fleur Adcock(New Zealand poet who moved to England in 1963):
  - The Virgin and the Nightingale: Medieval Latin poems, Newcastle-upon-Tyne: Bloodaxe Books
  - Selected Poems, Oxford and New York: Oxford University Press
- Leigh Davis, Willy's Gazette, Wellington: Jack Books
- Lauris Edmond, Catching It: Poems
- M. P. Jackson and V. O'Sullivan, editors, Oxford Anthology of New Zealand Writing Since 1945, anthology 1983
- Bill Manhire, Locating the Beloved and Other Stories, New Zealand
- W. H. Oliver, James K. Baxter: A Portrait, Wellington: Port Nicholson Press, 1983; reprinted 1994, Godwit Press/Bridget Williams Books, biography
- Bob Orr, Cargo

=== United Kingdom ===
- Fleur Adcock (New Zealand poet who moved to England in 1963):
  - The Virgin and the Nightingale: Medieval Latin poems, Newcastle-upon-Tyne: Bloodaxe Books
  - Selected Poems, Oxford and New York: Oxford University Press
- George Barker, Anno Domino
- George Mackay Brown, Voyages
- Alan Brownjohn, Collected Poems 1952–1983
- John Cooper Clarke, Ten Years in an Open Necked Shirt
- Helen Dunmore, The Apple Fall
- Gavin Ewart, Capital Letters
- Padraic Fallon, Poems and Versions (see also Poems 1974 in poetry, Collected Poems1990 in poetry), Irish poet published in the United Kingdom
- James Fenton, Memory of War and Children in Exile
- Roy Fuller, As From the Thirties
- Seamus Heaney, Northern Ireland native living at this time in the United States:
  - An Open Letter, Field Day
  - Translator: Sweeney Astray: A version from the Irish, Field Day
- Adrian Henri, Penny Arcade
- Geoffrey Hill, The Mystery of the Charity of Charles Peguy
- Frances Horovitz, Snow Light, Water Light
- Ted Hughes, River
- Jenny Joseph, Beyond Descartes
- Peter Levi, The Echoing Green
- Christopher Middleton, 111 Poems, Carcanet Press, ISBN 978-0-85635-457-1
- Pete Morgan, A Winter Visitor
- Andrew Motion, Secret Narratives
- Paul Muldoon, Quoof, Northern Ireland native published in the United Kingdom
- Grace Nichols, I is a Long-Memoried Woman, Caribbean Cultural International
- Sean O'Brien, The Indoor Park (Bloodaxe)
- Tom Paulin, Liberty Tree, including "Desertmartin", "Off the Back of a Lorry" and "A Written Answer", Faber and Faber, Irish poet published in the United Kingdom
- J. H. Prynne, The Oval Window
- Carol Rumens, Star Whisper
- Peter Scupham, Winter Quarters

=== United States ===
- A.R. Ammons, Lake Effect Country
- Maya Angelou, Shaker, Why Don't You Sing?
- Elizabeth Bishop, Collected Poems 1927-1979, posthumous (died 1979)
- Amy Clampitt, Kingfisher
- James Dickey, The Central Motion
- Alice Fulton, Dance Script with Electric Ballerina
- Nikki Giovanni, Those Who Ride the Nightwinds
- Frank Graziano, editor, Georg Trakl: A Profile, Logbridge-Rhodes, criticism
- H.D. (Hilda Doolittle), Collected Poems, 1912–1944, posthumous (died 1961)
- Seamus Heaney, Northern Ireland native living at this time in the United States:
  - An Open Letter, Field Day
  - Translator: Sweeney Astray: A version from the Irish, Field Day
- Joy Harjo, She Had Some Horses
- John Hollander, Powers of Thirteen
- Paul Hoover, Somebody Talks a Lot (The Yellow Press)
- Richard Howard, Lining Up
- W. S. Merwin, Opening the Hand, New York: Atheneum
- Gary Miranda, Grace Period
- Mary Oliver, American Primitive
- Carl Rakosi, Spiritus I
- James Reiss, Express
- Adrienne Rich, Sources
- William Saroyan, My Name Is Saroyan, a miscellany of fiction, nonfiction, drama and verse; published posthumously (died 1981)
- James Schevill, The American Fantasies: Collected Poems, 1945–1981
- Peter Seaton, Crisis Intervention (Berkeley, CA: Tuumba Press)
- Ntozake Shange, A Daughter's Geography
- Louis Simpson, The Best Hour of the Night
- Gary Snyder, Axe Handles
- Eleanor Ross Taylor, New and Selected Poems
- David Wagoner, First Light
- Robert Penn Warren, Chief Joseph of the Nez Perce

=== Other in English ===
- M. Nourbese Philip, Salmon Courage, Caribbean

== Works published in other languages ==
Listed by nation where the work was first published and again by the poet's native land, if different; substantially revised works listed separately:

=== French language ===
- Claude Esteban, Conjoncture du corps et du jardin suivi de Cosmogonie, Flammarion; France
- Abdellatif Laabi, translator, Rien qu'une autre année translated from the original Arabic of Mahmoud Darwich into French; Paris: Unesco/Éditions de Minuit
- Pierre Nepveu, Mahler et autres matières, Montréal: Le Noroît; Canada

=== Germany ===
- H. Bender, Deutsche Gedichte 1930-1960, anthology
- Hiltrud Gnüg, Entstehung und Krise lyrischer subjektivität. Vom Klassischen Lyrischen Ich zur Modernen Erfahrungswirklichkeit, Stuttgart (scholarship)
- Walter Hinderer, editor, Geschichte der deutschen Lyrik vom Mittelalter bis zur Gegenwart, Stuttgart (scholarship), called "indispensable" by the Princeton Encyclopedia of Poetry and Poetics (1993)
- Klaus Weissenberger, editor, Die deutsche Lyrik, 1945-1975 (scholarship)

=== India ===
In each section, listed in alphabetical order by first name:

==== Hindi ====
- Kedarnath Singh, Yahan Se Dekho, Delhi: Radhakrishan Prakashan; Hindi
- Rituraj, Abacus, Hapur: Sambhavana Prakashan
- Teji Grover, Yahan Kucch Andheri Aur Tikhi Hai Nadi, New Delhi: Bharati Bhasha Prakashan

==== Other languages in India ====
- Ajmer Rode, Chubhchintan, Amritsar: Nanak Singh Pustakmala; Punjabi-language
- Dilip Chitre, Daha by Daha, Mumbai: Pras Prakashan, Mumbai; Marathi-language
- K. Satchidanandan; Malayalam-language:
  - Randu Deergha Kavyangal, ("Two Long Poems")
  - Satchidandandante Kavithakal 1962-82, ("Poems (1962-82)")
- K. Siva Reddy, Bharamiti, Hyderabad: Jhari Poetry Circle; Telugu-language
- Mallika Sengupta, Challish Chander Ayu, Virus publication; Bengali-language
- Manushya Puthiran, Manushya Puthiranin Kavithaigal, Chennai: Manimegalai Prasuram, Tamil language
- Namdeo Dhasal, Khel Marathi-language
- Nirendranath Chakravarti, Ghor-duwar, Kolkata: Ananda Publishers; Bengali-language
- Prathibha Nandakumar, Navu Hudugiyare Heege ("We Girls Are Thus"), Bangalore: Kannada Sangha, Christ College; Kannada-language

=== Poland ===
- Zbigniew Herbert, Raport z oblężonego Miasta i inne wiersze ("Report from the Besieged City and Other Poems"), Paris: Instytut Literacki
- Ryszard Krynicki, Ocalenie z nicości ("Salvation from Nothingness"); Krakow: Swit
- Jarosław Marek Rymkiewicz, Ulica Mandelsztama ("Mandelstam Street")
- Piotr Sommer, Kolejny świat
- Jan Twardowski, Który stwarzasz jagody, Krakow: Wydawnictwo Literackie
- Wiktor Woroszylski, Lustro. Dziennik internowania ("Mirror: An Internment Journal")

=== Spain ===
- Matilde Camus:
  - Tierra de palabras ("Land of words")
  - Coral montesino ("Chorale of Monte")

=== Other languages ===
- Mia Couto, Raiz de Orvalho, Mozambican Portuguese
- Luo Fu, Wine-Brewing Stone, Chinese (Taiwan)
- Klaus Høeck, Denmark:
  - Eno High, with Asger Schnack, publisher: Schønberg
  - Metamorphoses, publisher: Gyldendal
- Marlene van Niekerk, Groenstaar, South Africa

== Awards and honors ==
=== Australia ===
- Kenneth Slessor Prize for Poetry: Vivian Smith, Tide Country

=== Canada ===
- Gerald Lampert Award: Diana Hartog, Matinee Light
- 1983 Governor General's Awards: David Donnell, Settlements (English); Suzanne Paradis, Un goût de sel (French)
- Pat Lowther Award: Rhea Tregebov, Remembering History
- Prix Émile-Nelligan: Lucien Francœur, Les Rockeurs sanctifiés

=== United Kingdom ===
- Cholmondeley Award: John Fuller, Craig Raine, Anthony Thwaite
- Eric Gregory Award: Martin Stokes, Hilary Davies, Michael O'Neill, Lisa St Aubin de Terán, Deidre Shanahan
- Commonwealth Poetry Prize: Grace Nichols, i is a long memoried woman

=== United States ===
- Agnes Lynch Starrett Poetry Prize: Kate Daniels, The White Wave
- AML Award for poetry to Clinton F. Larson for "A Romaunt of the Rose: A Tapestry of Poems"
- Pulitzer Prize for Poetry: Galway Kinnell - Selected Poems
- Rhysling Award:
  - Adam Cornford, Your Time and You: A Neoprole's Dating Guide (Long Form)
  - Alan P. Lightman, In Computers (Short Form)
- Fellowship of the Academy of American Poets: James Schuyler and Philip Booth

== Births ==
- July 2 – Tao Lin 林韬, Chinese novelist and poet
- December 6 – Jason Reynolds, African American children's novelist and poet
- Sarah Howe, Hong Kong-born English poet

== Deaths ==
Birth years link to the corresponding "[year] in poetry" article:

- February 18 – Robert Payne, 71 (born 1911), English professor of English literature in the U.S., lecturer in naval architecture, novelist, historian, poet and biographer
- May 4 – Shūji Terayama 寺山 修司 (born 1935), Japanese avant-garde poet, playwright, writer, film director and photographer
- May 21 – Amal Abul-Qassem Donqol (born 1940), Egyptian poet
- June 17 – Miron Białoszewski (born 1922), Polish poet and playwright
- June 19 – Vilmundur Gylfason (born 1948), Icelandic politician, historian and poet, by suicide
- June 27 – Alden Nowlan, 50 (born 1933), Canadian poet and novelist
- July 4 – Ted Berrigan, 48 (born 1934), American poet
- July 12 – Edwin Denby, 80 (born 1903), American dance critic and poet, by suicide
- August 12 – Mikey Smith (born 1954), Jamaican dub poet, stoned to death
- October 2 – Frances Horovitz, 45 (born 1938), English poet, broadcaster and performer of poetry

== See also ==
- Poetry
- List of years in poetry
- List of poetry awards
