= Cecily Nicholson =

Canadian poet

- Born: 1974 (age 51–52) Ontario
- Occupation: Poet; Arts Administrator; Curator
- Language: English
- Subject: Black diaspora; Indigenous displacement
- Notable awards: Dorothy Livesay Poetry Prize 2015 From the Poplars; Governor General's Award for English-language poetry 2018 Wayside Sang

Cecily Nicholson (born 1974) is a Canadian poet, arts administrator, independent curator, and activist. Originally from Ontario, she is now based in British Columbia. As a writer and a poet, Nicholson has published collections of poetry, contributed to collected literary works, presented public lectures and readings, and collaborated with numerous community organizations. As an arts administrator, she has worked at the Surrey Art Gallery in Surrey, British Columbia, and the artist-run centre Gallery Gachet in Vancouver.

== Writing ==
The literary themes of Nicholson's writing include historic research, documentary poetry, and social justice. Her published works have addressed issues of environmental devastation, displacement, and dispossession as impacts of capitalism, industry, and settler-colonialism. More specifically, Nicholson explores Black diaspora and Indigenous displacement by examining historical legacies of use and ownership, racial oppression, and systemic racism while examining ways that racialized and Indigenous communities have, and continue to, work through trauma by bearing witness, sharing narratives, and resilience.

=== Poetry ===
Nicholson has published collections of poetry: Triage, From the Poplars, Wayside Sang, Harrowings.

=== Critical writing ===
Nicholson has contributed essays and poetry to publications such as Canadian Art and The Capilano Review.

A selection of her work includes: "Porch Light, A Window: How a neighbourhood storefront became a gathering place for Vancouver's Black creative community", "'Before my book on New York, I was a painter'", "'They're all conjurors': A conversation with Deanna Bowen & Cecily Nicholson", as well as "summer barrels past", "the poem is a score".

=== As contributing author ===
Nicholson served as part of an editorial collective that worked in collaboration with educator Matt Hern and the youth community at Vancouver's Purple Thistle Center to produce an activism handbook for youth. It includes contributions by Noam Chomsky, Dan Savage, Grace Llewellyn, Astra Taylor, among others.

== Select exhibitions ==
=== 2012 Anamnesia: Unforgetting, VIVO Media Arts Centre ===
In 2012, VIVO, Vancouver's oldest media access artist run centre, presented Anamnesia: Unforgetting: polytemporality, implacement and possession in The Crista Dahl Media Library & Archive. Anamnesia encompassed a series of screenings of videos from the 1970s and 1980s, collected through the early Satellite Video Exchange program, and was accompanied by a publication. In her curatorial contribution, titled DISPATCHES: of wrested resumption, in time and area, Nicholson restored video documents from 1973 to 1979 that addressed the legacy of the Oglala Sioux and American Indian Movement stand at Wounded Knee, and reflected on concurrent narratives on prison asylum activism, the civil rights movement, and contemporary movements involving political and cultural engagement. Participating artists in Anamnesia included Sharon Bradley, Crista Dahl, Amy Kazymerchyk, Donato Mancini, and Alex Muir.

=== 2019 Estuary, Nanaimo Art Gallery ===
Co-curated by Christian Vistan and Jesse Birch, this exhibition explores estuary as a place of flux and process. The Nanaimo River Estuary, located on the traditional territory of the Snuneymuxw First Nation, serves as a resource and sanctuary for its inhabitants. Legacies of industrial and colonial land practices also significantly impact this environment. Participating artists included Charlotte Zhang, Tania Willard and Steven Thomas Davies, Tau Lewis, Julia Feyrer, Elisa Ferrari and John Brennan. Nicholson's contribution to this exhibition was a poetry chapbook.

- Dregs Plume (Nanaimo, BC: Nanaimo Art Gallery, 2019). ISBN 9780981262659

=== 2020 The Pandemic Is a Portal, SFU Galleries ===
Co-curated with Karina Irvine and Christopher Lacroix, this exhibition critically interrogated ideas around how community is formed and who it is formed with. In the midst of a global pandemic, participating artists considered how their responses to this time can prepare the ground for forms of community to come. The exhibition featured Sharona Franklin, S F Ho, Cecily Nicholson, Carmen Papalia, Jayce Salloum, and others.

== Select curatorial work ==
=== 2011 Imminent Future series, VIVO Media Arts Centre ===
Nicholson programmed a series of events in collaboration with Am Johal, Nicholas Perrin and Althea Thauberger. One installment, titled "NRAI: No Reading After the Internet", included the participation of artists Harjap Grewal, Tone Olaf Nielsen, Raymond Boisjoly, and Glen Coulthard, and considered community and aesthetic responses to imagined futures through intersections of cultural production, theory and activism.

== Public speaking ==
Nicholson regularly engages in poetry readings and public presentations about her poetry and social justice work. Select examples include:

- 2012: Lunch Poems at Simon Fraser University, with George Bowering
- 2017: Poetry Reading, as part of the Summer Indigenous Intensive at the University of British Columbia Okanagan, with David Garneau
- 2019: Cecily Nicholson and Juliane Okot Bitek with Lillian Allen: Forgetting, Remembering at the Art Gallery of Ontario
- 2019: Reading in Special Collections at Simon Fraser University

== Other projects ==
From 2019–2020, Nicholson served as a member of the Ethics Research Board for Emily Carr University of Art and Design. Nicholson has worked with women of the Downtown Eastside community of Vancouver since 2000 and has served as a coordinator of the Downtown Eastside Women's Centre.

=== Press Release Poetry Collective ===
As a poet and a writer, Nicholson has worked in collaboration with the Press Release Poetry Collective, which was formed in anticipation of the 2010 Winter Olympics in Vancouver. It sought to examine the event through a critical lens and respond to the media, advertising, censorship, art, nationalism, diversity of tactics, and issues of First Nations land rights impacted by it.

=== Safe Assembly project ===
Also in 2010, Nicholson participated in the Safe Assembly project, which included a series of readings and discussions focused on poetry and politics in the context of anti-Olympics resistance in Vancouver, 2010, and critique of the Olympic Industrial Complex more broadly. The project was hosted through VIVO Media Arts Centre by Stephen Collis, Roger Farr, and Donato Mancini.

=== Joint Effort ===
Nicholson works in an ongoing capacity with Joint Effort, a women in prison abolitionist group that engages in solidarity work with women prisoners in the Lower Mainland. The organization started as a sub committee of the British Columbia Federation of Women in 1980 and continues to operate by creating contacts between women in prison and various community organizations outside the prison. Initiatives include the Stark Raven Media Collective, the Prisoners' Justice Day Committee, and the Books 2 Prisoners program.

=== No One Is Illegal Vancouver ===
Nicholson has made contributions to the efforts of No One Is Illegal, a grassroots anti-colonial migrant justice group based in Vancouver. This includes conducting research and reporting on issues around immigration controls, racial profiling, detention and deportation, law enforcement brutality, and exploitative working conditions of migrants.

== Awards and recognition ==
=== Residencies ===
- 2017: Ellen Warren Tallman Writer in Residence at Simon Fraser University
- 2021: Writer in Residence at the University of Windsor

=== Literary awards ===
- 2015: Won the Dorothy Livesay Poetry Prize for From the Poplars
- 2018: Won the Governor General's Award for English-language poetry at the 2018 Governor General's Awards for Wayside Sang
- 2023: Shortlisted for the Pat Lowther Award for Harrowings

== Bibliography ==
=== Poetry collections ===
- —— (2011). Triage (paperback 1st ed.). Vancouver: Talonbooks. ISBN 9780889226579.
- —— (2014). From the Poplars (paperback 1st ed.). Vancouver: Talonbooks. ISBN 9780889228566.
- —— (2017). Wayside Sang (paperback 1st ed.). Vancouver: Talonbooks. ISBN 9781772011821.
- —— (2022). Harrowings (paperback 1st ed.). Vancouver: Talonbooks. ISBN 9781772014051.

=== Contributions ===
- —— (2013). Stay Solid! A Radical Handbook for Youth (paperback 1st ed.). Chico, CA: AK Press. ISBN 9781849350990.
