= Christopher Patton =

Christopher Patton may refer to:

- Chris Patton (born 1971), American actor
- Christopher D. Patton (born 1969), Canadian poet

== See also ==
- Chris Patten (born 1944), British politician
