= Sachiko Murakami =

Canadian poet (born 1980)

Sachiko Murakami (born 1980) is a Canadian poet. She is most noted for her 2008 collection The Invisibility Exhibit, which was a shortlisted finalist for the Governor General's Award for English-language poetry at the 2008 Governor General's Awards and the Gerald Lampert Award.

Murakami was born in Vancouver, British Columbia. Her other works include Rebuild (2011), Get Me Out of Here (2015), and Render (2020). Render was shortlisted for the Governor General's Award for English-language poetry at the 2020 Governor General's Awards.
