= The Shunning =

1980 poetry collection by Patrick Friesen

- Author: Patrick Friesen
- Language: English
- Published: 1980 (Turnstone Press)
- Publication place: Canada
- Media type: Print (paperback)
- Pages: 105 pp (first edition)

The Shunning is the third volume of poetry by the Canadian poet Patrick Friesen published in 1980 by Turnstone Press. The poem explores the social ramifications of a man from a conservative Mennonite community who experiences a shunning. The book is considered an important work of early secular Mennonite poetry. The poem was turned into a play, first performed at Prairie Theatre Exchange in Winnipeg in 1985 and later by Royal Manitoba Theatre Centre. A radio play version was produced in 1990.
