= Julie Joosten =

American-Canadian poet (born 1980)

- Born: 1980 (age 45–46); Marietta, Georgia
- Occupation: poet
- Writing career
- Period: 2010s-present
- Notable work: Light Light

Julie Joosten (born 1980) is an American-Canadian poet. Her debut collection, Light Light, was a nominee for the Governor General's Award for English-language poetry at the 2014 Governor General's Awards, the 2014 Gerald Lampert Award and the 2014 Goldie Award from the Golden Crown Literary Society.

Originally from Marietta, Georgia, she is a graduate of Williams College, Oxford University, the University of Iowa Writers' Workshop and Cornell University. She is currently based in Toronto, Ontario.
