= Arleen Paré =

Canadian writer (born 1946)

- Born: Montreal, Quebec, Canada
- Occupation: poet
- Writing career
- Period: 2000s–present
- Notable works: Paper Trail, Lake of Two Mountains

Arleen Lyda Paré (born 1946) is a Canadian writer. She has published three collections of poetry and two novels to date.

Originally from Montreal, Quebec, Paré was educated in social work and adult education, and worked in social services in Vancouver, British Columbia for much of her professional career. She later left her social services job to study creative writing at the University of Victoria.

Her first book, Paper Trail, was published in 2007. A blend of poetry and prose about a businesswoman finding herself stifled by the weight of corporate bureaucracy, the book was a shortlisted nominee for the Dorothy Livesay Poetry Prize in 2008, and won that year's City of Victoria Butler Book Award. She followed up with the novel Leaving Now in 2012.

Her 2014 poetry collection Lake of Two Mountains won the Governor General's Award for English-language poetry at the 2014 Governor General's Awards.

A lesbian, she once served on the board of Plenitude magazine.

== Works ==
- Paper Trail (2007, ISBN 978-1897126134)
- Leaving Now (2012, ISBN 978-1894759748)
- Lake of Two Mountains (2014, ISBN 978-1926829876)
- He Leaves His Face in the Funeral Car (2015, ISBN 978-1927575925)
- The Girls with Stone Faces (2017, ISBN 978-1771314640)
- Earle Street (2020, ISBN 978-1772012507)
- First (2021, ISBN 978-1771315425)
- Time Out of Time (2022, ISBN 978-1773860794)
- Encrypted (2025, ISBN 978-1773861647)
