= D. C. Reid =

Canadian poet, novelist and short story writer

Dennis Colin "D. C." Reid (born 5 August 1952) is a Canadian poet, novelist and short story writer. He also writes about fly fishing, high end automobiles, round the world yacht races and the human brain. The latter subject covers the last fifteen years of human brain science, creativity and how poets do their art.

Born in Calgary, Alberta, he lives in Victoria, British Columbia.

Two of Reid's poetry collections, Love And Other Things That Hurt (1999) and The Hunger (2004) were nominated for the Dorothy Livesay Poetry Prize.

In 2023 he established the DC Reid Poets' Grant. Administered by the Writers’ Trust of Canada and funded by Reid, it provides $5000 grants to "working poets of modest means". In 2024 he set up a $1,500,000 endowment at the Writer's Trust to fund eight annual grants in perpetuity.

Reid's two websites are: www.catchsalmonbc.com, and www.dcreid.ca.

== Bibliography ==
=== Poetry ===
- The Women Who Surround Me - 1991
- Open 24 Hours - 1997
- Love and Other Things that Hurt - 1999
- The Hunger - 2004
- What It Means To Be Human - 2009

=== Novels ===
- The Knife Behind the Gills - 1995

=== Non-fiction ===
- A History of the Salmon Arm Golf Course, 1928-1992 - 1993 (with Todor Davies)
- How to Catch Salmon - 1995
- Maximum Salmon - 2007
- Fishing for Dreams: Notes from the Water's Edge - 2005
- Vancouver Island Fishing Guide - 2008
- Catch Fish Have Fun - BC's 52 Best Bets - 2011 - Kindle Single
- Catch Fish Have Fun - Langara Island BC - 2011 - Kindle Single
