= White Lake (film) =

1989 Canadian documentary film

- Directed by: Colin Browne
- Produced by: Colin Browne
- Cinematography: Rolf Cutts; Paul Guenette; Randy Rotheisler; Tom Turnbull
- Edited by: Colin Browne
- Music by: Jean Piché
- Distributed by: Canadian Filmmakers' Distribution Centre
- Release date: September 1989 (TIFF)
- Running time: 80 minutes
- Country: Canada
- Language: English

White Lake is a Canadian documentary film, directed by Colin Browne and released in 1989. The film centres on Browne's own family history, through the lens of a family reunion at a retreat in White Lake, British Columbia.

The film premiered at the 1989 Festival of Festivals. It was later screened at the 1989 Festival of the Arts in Ottawa, and at the 1989 Vancouver International Film Festival.

The film received a Genie Award nomination for Best Feature Length Documentary at the 11th Genie Awards in 1990.
