= Colin Browne (filmmaker) =

Canadian writer, filmmaker, and academic

Colin Browne is a Canadian writer, documentary filmmaker and academic. He is most noted for his documentary film White Lake, which was a Genie Award nominee for Best Feature Length Documentary at the 11th Genie Awards in 1990, and his poetry collection Ground Water, which was shortlisted for the Governor General's Award for English-language poetry at the 2002 Governor General's Awards.

A longtime professor of film at Simon Fraser University, he launched the PRAXIS workshop for aspiring screenwriters and has been active in efforts to preserve and archive old and rare British Columbia films.

His other films as a documentarian have included Strathyre (1979), A Visit from Captain Cook (1980), Hoppy: A Portrait of Elisabeth Hopkins (1984), The Image Before Us (1986), Father and Son (1992) and Linton Garner: I Never Said Goodbye (2003). As a poet, he has also been a two-time nominee for the Dorothy Livesay Poetry Prize, receiving nods in 2003 for Ground Water and in 2013 for The Properties, and a ReLit Award nominee in 2008 for The Shovel.
