= Purdy Poetry Prize =

Canadian literary award

The Al and Eurithe Purdy Poetry Prize is a Canadian literary award, presented annually to honour the best works of poetry by Canadian writers published in the previous year.

The award was created in 2024 by Eurithe Purdy, the widow of influential Canadian poet Al Purdy, and awards $10,000 to the winner. It is presented annually on April 21, the anniversary of Al Purdy's death. It was created in part as a response to the Griffin Poetry Prize dropping its dedicated Canadian poetry category the previous year, with Eurithe Purdy stressing the importance of literary prize money in having helped her and Al to keep their rent paid in his early career.

In the first year, the award winner was selected directly by Eurithe Purdy in consultation with literary advisors, with the winners in following years selected by a jury from a list of nominees.

== Winners and nominees ==
| Year | Writer | Book | Result | Ref |
|---|---|---|---|---|
| 2024 | Sid Marty | Oldman's River: New and Collected Poems | Winner | |
| 2025 | A. F. Moritz | Great Silent Ballad | Winner | |
| 2025 | Brian Bartlett | The Astonishing Room | Shortlist | |
| 2025 | Tim Bowling | In the Capital City of Autumn | Shortlist | |
| 2025 | Michael Ondaatje | A Year of Last Things | Shortlist | |
| 2025 | Harold Rhenisch | The Salmon Shanties: A Cascadian Song Cycle | Shortlist | |
| 2025 | Colin Morton | Scar Atlas | Longlist | |
| 2025 | Catherine Owen | Moving to Delilah | Longlist | |
| 2025 | Matthew Tierney | Lossless | Longlist | |
| 2025 | Rhea Tregebov | Talking to Strangers | Longlist | |
| 2025 | Tom Wayman | How Can You Live Here? | Longlist | |
| 2026 | Tom Wayman | Out of the Ordinary | Winner | |
| 2026 | Joseph Dandurand | I Would Like to Say Thank You | Shortlist | |
| 2026 | Evelyn Lau | Parade of Storms | Shortlist | |
| 2026 | Karen Solie | Wellwater | Shortlist | |
| 2026 | Nicola Vulpe | On the News that Sagittarius A* Grows Hungrier | Shortlist | |
| 2026 | George Amabile | Seeing Things | Longlist | |
| 2026 | bill bissett | th book uv lost passwords 1 | Longlist | |
| 2026 | Marilyn Bowering | Frayed Linens | Longlist | |
| 2026 | Lorne Daniel | What Is Broken Binds Us | Longlist | |
| 2026 | Gillian Sze | An Orange, a Syllable | Longlist | |
