= Terence Young (writer) =

Canadian writer (born 1953)

Terence Young (born 1953) is a Canadian writer. He is most noted for his poetry collection The Island in Winter, which was shortlisted for the Governor General's Award for English-language poetry at the 1999 Governor General's Awards and for the Gerald Lampert Award in 2000.

The Island in Winter was his debut poetry collection. The following year he published his first short story collection, Rhymes with Useless. He followed up with the novel After Goodlake's in 2004, the poetry collection Moving Day in 2006, and the short story collection The End of the Ice Age in 2010.

Rhymes with Useless was a finalist for the Danuta Gleed Literary Award in 2001, After Goodlake's won the city of Victoria's Butler Book Prize in 2005, and Moving Day was a finalist for the Dorothy Livesay Poetry Prize in 2007.

He is married to poet Patricia Young. Their daughter Clea Young is also a writer, whose debut short story collection Teardown was published in 2016.
