= Ali Blythe =

Canadian poet and editor

Ali Blythe is a Canadian poet and editor. He is author of a trilogy of books exploring trans-poetics: Twoism (2015), Hymnswitch (2019), and Stedfast (2023), two of which were finalists for the Dorothy Livesay Poetry Prize. In 2017, he was recipient of an honour of distinction for the Dayne Ogilvie Prize for LGBTQ writers.

A graduate of the University of Victoria, he is the former editor of the literary magazineThe Claremont Review.

He lives in Victoria, British Columbia.
