= Gallery Gachet =

- Established: 1994
- Location: 9 West Hastings Street, Vancouver
- Coordinates: 49.281745721930996°N 123.10513930418593°W
- Type: artist-run gallery
- Director: Moroti George
- Curators: Moroti George, Sol Hashemi
- Website: gachet.org

Gachet Gallery is an artist-run art gallery in the Downtown Eastside neighborhood of Vancouver. It is named after Paul Gachet, the physician of Vincent van Gogh. Van Gogh, an artist widely considered an "Outsider artist," is evoked in the name of Gallery Gachet to signify its mission to promote the works of outsider artists and artists dealing with mental illnesses. The gallery describes its mandate as being "to support artists and offer art programs addressing mental health and socio-political marginalization while promoting art as a means for survival, cultural participation and human rights."

== History ==
Gallery Gachet was founded in 1994 and started as a co-operative venture, with fifty full and associate members. The gallery's original location was at 1134 Granville street in a small basement studio. In 1995 the gallery moved into a bigger space at 88 East Cordova Street in the Downtown Eastside. It relocated to its current location in the Beacon Hotel at 9 West Hastings Street in 2017; it is large enough to offer multiple exhibitions a year, along with artists talks and residencies.

Gallery Gachet originally received a majority of its funding from Vancouver Coastal Health. The mission of Gallery Gachet, as a community-driven and grassroots organization, was to advocate and educate the public about mental illness through art initially aligned with VCH focus on community health-centred focus. However, over the years, Vancouver Coastal Health shifted their focus to an evidence-based medicine mandate, and as a result, Gallery Gachet lost its main source of funding. Currently, the Canada Council for the Arts is one of several government bodies that gives funding to Gallery Gachet, as well as the City of Vancouver, the Province of British Columbia, and the British Columbia Arts Council. The artist and poet Cecily Nicholson has served as an arts administrator for the gallery. The artist Tania Willard has worked as an artist in residence at the gallery.

== Programming ==
The mandate of Gachet gallery has always been to "centre people marginalized by their mental health, trauma, and/or abuse experience". Their programming reflects this mandate. In September 1995, Gallery Gachet had an exhibition titled "Disclosures 2", a juried exhibition of local artists living with mental illness. On March 15, 2008, Gallery Gachet held a symposium on outsider arts, featuring artists, writers and curators from Vancouver, Seattle and New York. In June 2005, Gallery Gachet ran an exhibition featuring works by 50 local punk artists. In August 2006, Gallery Gachet ran a series of programs focusing on the practice of street art, which can range from murals to art made with found objects. The program was called Arena: street art. In 2009, SD Holman exhibited his photographic documentation of gender transformation at Gallery Gachet. In 2011, Gallery Gachet ran an exhibition titled Margins and The Mentally Ill as Simulacra. In 2016, an artist with Down Syndrome named Teresa Pocock had a solo exhibition at Gallery Gachet. Also in 2016, an exhibition titled "still here" was featured at the gallery. In March 2022, Gallery Gachet ran an exhibition titled "Honour their names", an exhibit highlighting police killings of Indigenous peoples. Also in 2022, an art exhibit featuring works by incarcerated artists titled Locked up: The soul speaks out was featured at the gallery. In 2023, West Moberly First Nations Artist Dion Smith-Dokkie held an exhibition at Gachet Gallery titled "This will be the first of a thousand worlds we give life to".
