= Patrick Friesen =

Canadian author (born 1946)

- Born: 5 July 1946 (age 80); Steinbach, Manitoba
- Education: University of Manitoba
- Occupation: Writer
- Spouse: Eve Joseph
- Writing career
- Period: 1970s—present
- Genres: poetry, plays, essays
- Notable works: The Shunning, Blasphemer's Wheel, A Broken Bowl

Patrick Frank Friesen (born 5 July 1946) is a Canadian author born in Steinbach, Manitoba, primarily known for his poetry and stage plays beginning in the 1970s.

== Life and career ==
Friesen was born into a Mennonite family in Steinbach, Manitoba in 1946. As a child growing up in Steinbach, he was friends with Shingoose, who later became a well-known musician, and Wayne Tefs, future author and co-founder of Turnstone Press. After graduating high school at the Steinbach Collegiate Institute, he studied at the University of Manitoba and lived in Winnipeg for thirty years.

In addition to poetry, Friesen has also written songs and collaborated with dancers, choreographers, composers and musicians. His Mennonite upbringing still influences his writing in work such as The Shunning, which is about the persecution of a Mennonite farmer questioning his religion.

Friesen lives in Victoria, British Columbia, and is a teacher of creative writing at the University of Victoria. He is married to poet Eve Joseph.

== Awards and recognition ==
=== Awards won ===
- 1994: McNally Robinson Book of the Year Award for Blasphemer's Wheel.
- 2012: ReLit Award for poetry for Jumping in the Asylum.
- 2018: Winnipeg Theatre Award for Outstanding New Work for A Short History of Crazy Bone.

=== Runners-up and shortlisted works ===
- Milton Acorn People's Poet Award – runner-up for Blasphemer's Wheel.
- 1997: Governor General's Award for English-language poetry – shortlisted for A Broken Bowl.
- 1999: Dorothy Livesay Poetry Prize – shortlisted for St. Mary at Main.
- 2003: Dorothy Livesay Poetry Prize – shortlisted for The Breath You Take from the Lord.
- 2016: Griffin Poetry Prize – shortlisted for Frayed Opus for Strings & Wind Instruments, translated from Danish with Per Brask. The original poems were written by Ulrikka S. Gernes.
- 2016: Fred Cogswell Award for Excellence in Poetry – shortlisted.

== Works ==
=== Poetry ===
- The Lands I Am (1976)
- Bluebottle (1978)
- The Shunning (1980)
- Unearthly Horses (1985)
- Flicker and Hawk (1987)
- You Don't Get to Be a Saint (1992)
- Blasphemer's Wheel: Selected and New Poems (1994)
- A Broken Bowl (1997)
- St. Mary at Main (1998)
- Carrying the Shadow (1999)
- The Breath You Take from the Lord (2002)
- Bordello Poems (2004)
- Earth's Crude Gravities (2007)
- Jumping in the Asylum (2011)
- A Dark Boat (2012)
- A Short History of Crazy Bone (2015)
- Songen (2018)
- Outlasting the Weather: Selected and New Poems (2020)
- Sightings (2026)

=== Essays ===
- Interim: Essays and Mediations (2005)

=== Contributions to anthologies ===
- An Anthology of Prairie Poetry (1981)
- Ride Off Any Horizon (1983)
- Visions and Reality (1985)
- Pieces of the Jigsaw: A Multicultural Anthology for Young Readers (1986)
- Section Lines: A Manitoba Anthology (1986)
- Why I Am a Mennonite (1988)
- A Labour of Love (1989)
- A/long Prairie Lines: An Anthology of Long Prairie Poems (1989)
- Liars and Rascals: Anthology of Mennonite Short Stories (1989)
- Prairie Fire: New Mennonite Writing (1989)
- Mennonite/s Writing in Canada (1990)
- The Perfect Piece: Monologues from Canadian Plays (1990)
- Inscriptions: A Prairie Poetry Anthology (1992)
- Let the Earth Take Note: First Anthology of the National Milton Acorn Festival from 1987 to 1991 (1994)
- Poetry and Knowing (1995)
- Our Fathers: Poetry and Prose by Daughters and Sons from the Prairies (1995)
- Instant Applause, Volume II: Thirty Very Short Complete Plays (1996)
- Passeport: La Poésie Moderne de Langue Anglaise au Canada (1998)
- Following the Plough: Recovering the Rural (2000)
- New Life in Dark Seas: Brick Books 25 (2000)
- Mocambo Nights: Poetry from the Mocambo Reading Series (2001)
- The New Long Line Anthology, second edition (2001)
- 15 Canadian Poets x 3 (2001)
- Why I Sing the Blues (2001)
- Instant Applause: Twenty-nine Very Short Complete Plays (2004)

=== Plays and performances ===
- The Shunning (1985), stage adaptation.
- Amanda (1986), radio drama.
- Anna (1987), dance and spoken-word collaboration with Stephanie Ballard, featuring Margie Gillis.
- Noah (1987), performance combining several art forms.
- Singer (1989), radio documentary drama about Richard Manuel, with Big Dave McLean.
- The Shunning (1990), radio adaptation produced by John Juliani.
- Second Birth (1991), radio drama.
- Handful of Rain (1991), performance collaboration with Dance Collective and other artists.
- The Raft (1992), stage play.
- Friday, 6:32 p.m. (1993), short stage play.
- Old Woman and the Bones (1993), collaboration with composer Michael Matthews, the musical group Thira and Primus Theatre.
- Madrugada (1995), an expanded version of Old Woman and the Bones.
- The Shunning (1995), dance adaptation performed by Motus O dance theatre.
- Broken Bowl (1996), spoken-word performance with jazz pianist Marilyn Lerner, later recorded as Blue Door.
- Voice (1996), radio documentary featuring Big Dave McLean and Tracey Dahl, produced by Andrea Ratuski.
- The Raft (1997), radio adaptation by Nancy Trites Botkin, produced by Kathleen Flaherty.

=== Recordings and films ===
==== Audio recordings with Marilyn Lerner ====
- Blue Door (1997)
- Small Rooms (2003)
- Calling the Dog Home (2005)

==== Films ====
- Esther Warkov: A Spy in the House (1983), producer.
- Don Proch: The Spirit of Assessippi (1985), writer, producer and director.
- Patrick Lane (1985), director and producer.
- A Ritual of Horses: The Art of Michael Olito (1987), director.
- Rising to Dance (1990), documentary about students at the Royal Winnipeg Ballet; director.
- Together as One: A Dance Collaboration (1991), writer, director and producer..
