= Mercedes Eng =

Canadian poet and educator

Mercedes Eng is a Canadian writer, poet and educator based in Vancouver, British Columbia. Her poetry books are Mercenary English (2013), yt mama (2020), and Prison Industrial Complex Explodes (2017). Eng's poetic work considers themes such as race relations and socioeconomics. In 2018 she won the Dorothy Livesay Poetry Prize.

== Early life and education ==
Eng was born in Medicine Hat, Alberta. She is of mixed (white- and Chinese-Canadian) heritage, which she explores in her 2020 book my yt mama among other works.

== Publications ==
- February 2010 (2010) - Chapbook
- knuckle sandwich (2011) - Chapbook
- Mercenary English (2013, reissued in 2016 and 2018) - Book
- Prison Industrial Complex Explodes (2017) - Book
- my yt mama (2020) - Book

=== Prison Industrial Complex Explodes ===
==== Summary ====
Prison Industrial Complex Explodes is a book of poetry that is split into 9 sections, told in a Q&A style that helps document her father’s time in a British Columbian Prison. Eng documents her father’s life through photos, art, letters, government documents, and more. Her poetry focuses mainly on language, documentation, and themes related to prisons and policing. There are some recurring characters such as Carole, inspired by an Indigenous woman who Eng met when she was visiting her father in prison. The main character though is her father, Don Eng. The book revolves around his imprisonment and the challenges he faced, including how prisons impact not only prisoners but their families and communities.

==== Style ====
Eng’s poem is nearly entirely written as a response to a Canadian Multiculturalism Act questionnaire from 2013. The questionnaire is no longer available to the public. Several of Eng’s answers come from such “found and juxtaposed text” coming from various websites including Deloitte, CoreCivic and Federal Prison Industries. Eng uses the language of both the state and large corporations involved in corrections in order to criticize both of these entities. Other sources of her text include letters to and from her father and state documents relating to her father’s incarceration. By using the state’s documents and letters in order to answer the questionnaire, she is able to highlight the hypocrisy within the system and demystify official speech.

Eng’s own word sections include poetry involving her and her family’s personal experiences with having an incarcerated family member, and a character named Carole who appears multiple times and is based on someone Eng met when she visited her father. Eng also includes photographs of her family and her father throughout the book.

==== Themes ====
===== Abolition =====
Eng, who makes it clear she is an abolitionist, writes on issues surrounding police brutality and the unfairness within the PIC. She reflects on what abolition could do for Black, Indigenous, and other racialized peoples in relation to social inclusion and participation, and equality of opportunity. Eng believes that with the enforcement of a changed system, there would be a decrease in the numbers of Black and Indigenous peoples within the prison system, and that this number will drop from “40% of all inmates being from non-white background.” In a 2023 interview, she discusses her view on abolition and the ways in which it is misinterpreted by the public. There is a clear sense of what abolition could be in one of her written poems, the “or” of what things growing up for her could be without so much physical labour thrust upon prisoners. Eng’s view on abolition revolves around telling her father's story and she compares his forced labour during his incarceration to slavery. Eng documents the wages for prisoners, with many being paid $0.23 - $1.15 an hour for labour intensive work. Eng’s book advocates for abolition in the way she writes and critiques the many issues within the PIC, and the opportunities abolition could create for prisoners and their families.

===== Multiculturalism =====
Eng's work highlights racial inequalities within prisons, focusing on how Indigenous, Black, and other people of colour are affected by incarceration and its violence. Prison Industrial Complex Explodes explains how undocumented workers entering Canada are even exploited by the media, citing that "The B.C. Civil Liberties Association plans to file a privacy complaint against the Canada Border Services Agency (CBSA) for allowing a reality TV show to film travellers crossing Canada's border without their free and informed consent." Eng describes how the PIC focuses on alienating marginalized groups, while also supporting the resilience these cultures show. Prison Industrial Complex Explodes focuses on fighting the systemic exploitation and violence directed at marginalized communities while displaying their resilience and resistance.

===== Archives =====
In Prison Industrial Complex Explodes, Mercedes Eng explores the concept of archives as a central theme, examining how institutional records shape narratives of incarceration and identity. Archives, traditionally understood as repositories of historical records, are depicted as powerful tools of surveillance and control within the prison system while at the same time can serve to showcase humanity within the context of familial history. Eng critiques the ways in which carceral records construct and often control histories of marginalized communities, aligning with scholarship that values the family archive’s role in defining public and private heritage. The book also intersects with discussions of personal and communal memory, emphasizing how state-maintained records can obscure or distort lived experiences. Eng emphasizes archival materials and their origins, focusing not only on prison records housed in colonial archives, contending that their bureaucratic nature regulates and constrain prisoners' identities, but also her own personal artifacts that challenge institutional legitimacy. By foregrounding the archival logic of documentation, Eng challenges readers to consider whose stories are preserved and whose are erased. This methodology aligns with broader archival theory, which questions how records serve as instruments of both memory and marginalization in societal power structures. Through poetic engagement with these records, Prison Industrial Complex Explodes ultimately reframes archives as contested sites where personal histories clash with institutional narratives.
