= Chantal Gibson =

Canadian writer, poet, artist, and educator

- Born: Quebec, Canada
- Occupation: Writer, poet, artist, educator
- Notable awards: Pat Lowther Award (2020); Dorothy Livesay Poetry Prize (2020)

Chantal Gibson is a Canadian writer, poet, artist, and educator. Her 2019 poetry collection How She Read won the 2020 Pat Lowther Award, the 2020 Dorothy Livesay Poetry Prize at the BC and Yukon Book Prizes, and was a shortlisted 2020 Griffin Poetry Prize finalist. Gibson's art and writing confronts colonialism, cultural erasure, and representations of Black women in Western culture.

== Early life and education ==
Born in Quebec, Gibson went to high school in Mackenzie, British Columbia. Her mother is an African-Canadian who grew up in Nova Scotia.

== Career ==
Gibson is a writer-artist-educator based on the ancestral lands of the Coast Salish Peoples in Vancouver, British Columbia, where she is a lecturer in written and visual communication at Simon Fraser University's School of Interactive Arts and Technology (SIAT). Gibson was the recipient of the SFU Excellence in Teaching Award in 2016.

== Awards and honours ==
=== Literary ===
- 2016 - SFU Excellence in Teaching Award, Simon Fraser University
- 2020 - Dorothy Livesay Poetry Prize at the BC and Yukon Book Prizes
- 2020 - Pat Lowther Award for Best Book of Poetry by a Canadian woman, League of Canadian Poets
- 2020 - Griffin Poetry Prize, Canadian Shortlist
- 2020 - Jim Deva Prize for Writing that Provokes, shortlist
- 2021 - 3M National Teaching Fellowship, Society for Teaching and Learning in Higher Education (STLHE)

=== Exhibitions ===
- 2014 - TOME. SFU Surrey Library (2014)
- 2014 - Between Friends: Crossings, Myths and Border Stories. Defiance College Women's Gallery, Defiance Ohio
- 2015 - TOME. Vancouver Public Library, Vancouver, BC
- 2018 - Here We Are Here: Black Canadian Contemporary Art. ROM Toronto and Musee des Beaux Arts Montreal
- 2018 - MORPH: Changing the Past. (Inaugural group exhibit) Vancouver Public Library, Main Branch
- 2019 - How She Read: Confronting the Romance of Empire. (Solo exhibit) Open Space Gallery, Victoria, BC
- 2019 - TOME. McPherson Library, University of Victoria, Victoria, BC
- 2019 - Here We Are Here: Black Canadian Contemporary Art. Art Gallery of Nova Scotia, Halifax
- 2020 - Who's Who. Senate of Canada chamber foyer, Ottawa, ON
- 2020 - Where do we go from here? (Group exhibit) Vancouver Art Gallery, Vancouver, BC
- 2021 - Human Capital. (Group exhibit) MacKenzie Art Gallery, Regina, SK
- 2021 - un/settled. In collaboration with Otoniya J. Okot Bitek. SFU Belzberg Library, Vancouver BC
- 2021 - Tyranny. (Group exhibition) Art Gallery of Nova Scotia, Halifax

=== Artist-in-residence ===
- 2017 - Visiting artist, OCAD University Writing & Learning Centre, Toronto, ON

== Bibliography ==
- —— (2019). How She Read: Poems. Caitlin Press.
- —— (2021). with/holding: Poems. Caitlin Press.
