= Kayla Czaga =

Canadian poet

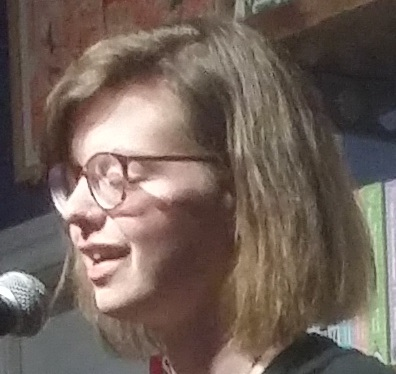
- Born: 1989 (age 36–37)
- Occupation: poet
- Writing career
- Period: 2010s-present
- Notable work: For Your Safety Please Hold On

Kayla Czaga (born 1989) is a Canadian poet who won the Gerald Lampert Award in 2015 for her debut collection For Your Safety Please Hold On. The book was also a shortlisted nominee for the Governor General's Award for English language poetry, the Dorothy Livesay Poetry Prize and the Canadian Authors Association's Emerging Writer Award.

Czaga graduated from the University of Victoria in 2011 with a degree in English and creative writing before pursuing an MFA at the University of British Columbia. Her poetry has also been published in The Puritan, The Walrus, Room, Event, The Malahat Review and The Antigonish Review.

Both her second collection of poems, Dunk Tank, and her third, Midway, were finalists for the Dorothy Livesay Poetry Prize.
