= Russell Thornton (writer) =

Canadian poet

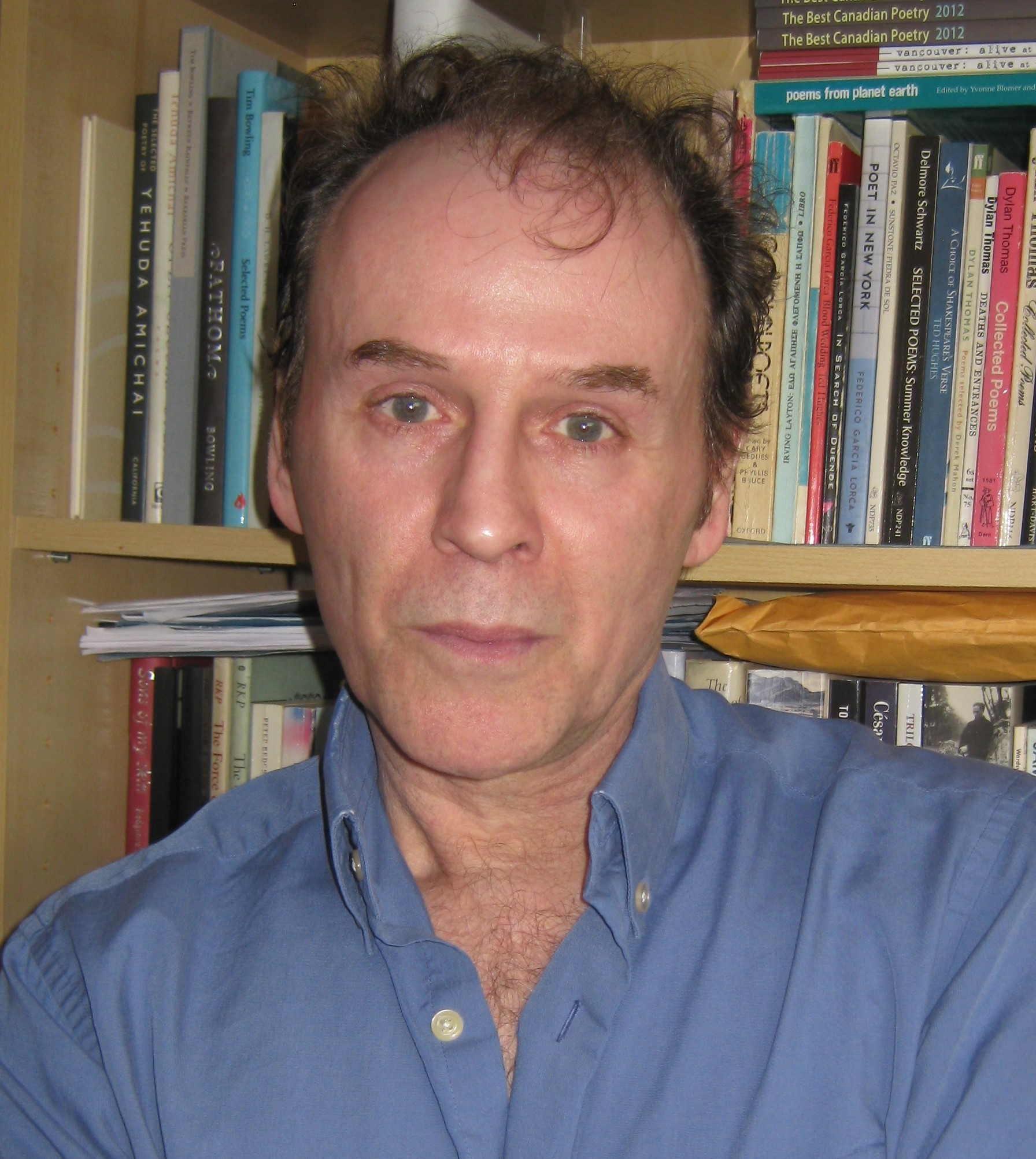
- Born: North Vancouver, British Columbia, Canada
- Occupation: poet
- Writing career
- Period: 2000s -- present
- Notable works: The Hundred Lives (2014); Birds, Metals, Stones & Rain (2013)

Russell Thornton is a Canadian poet.

His book House Built of Rain (2003) was a shortlisted nominee for the 2004 Dorothy Livesay Poetry Prize and the 2004 ReLit Award.

His collection Birds, Metals, Stones and Rain (2013) was a shortlisted nominee for the Governor General's Award for English-language poetry at the 2013 Governor General's Awards, the 2014 Raymond Souster Award and the 2014 Dorothy Livesay Poetry Prize.

His collection The Hundred Lives (2014) was a shortlisted nominee for the 2015 Griffin Poetry Prize.

He is based in North Vancouver, British Columbia.

== Awards ==
Awards for Thornton's writing
Year	Title	Award	Result	Ref.
2004	House Built of Rain	Dorothy Livesay Poetry Prize	Shortlist	
2004	House Built of Rain	ReLit Awards	Nominee	
2013	Birds, Metals, Stones and Rain	Governor General's Award for English-language poetry	Nominee	
2014	Birds, Metals, Stones and Rain	Dorothy Livesay Poetry Prize	Shortlist	
2014	Birds, Metals, Stones and Rain	Raymond Souster Award	Shortlist	
2015	The Hundred Lives	Griffin Poetry Prize	Shortlist	

== Publications ==
- 2000 The Fifth Window
- 2002 A Tunisian Notebook
- 2003 House Built of Rain
- 2006 The Human Shore
- 2013 Birds, Metals, Stones & Rain
- 2014 The Hundred Lives
- 2018 The Broken Face
- 2021 Answer to Blue
- 2023 The White Light of Tomorrow
- 2026 Two Songs: Selected Poems 2000-2025
