= David Zieroth =

Canadian poet

David Zieroth (born November 7, 1946, in Neepawa, Manitoba) is a Canadian poet. He won the Dorothy Livesay Poetry Prize in 1999 for How I Joined Humanity at Last, and the Governor General's Award for English language poetry in 2009 for The Fly in Autumn.

== Works ==
- 1973: Clearing: Poems from a Journey
- 1981: Mid-River
- 1985: When the Stones Fly Up
- 1991: The Weight of My Raggedy Skin
- 1998: How I Joined Humanity at Last
- 2000: The Tangled Bed
- 2000: Palominos and Other Poems
- 2001: Crows Do Not Have Retirement
- 2002: The Education of Mr Whippoorwill: A Country Boyhood
- 2006: The Village of Sliding Time
- 2008: Dust in the Brocade
- 2009: The Fly in Autumn
- 2009: Berlin Album
- 2010: Hay Day Canticle
- 2013: The November Optimist
- 2014: Albrecht Dürer and me
- 2015: Zoo and Crowbar
- 2018: the bridge from day to night
- 2022: watching for life
- 2023: the trick of staying and leaving
- 2024: first here and then far: selected poems 1971−2024
