= Eve Joseph =

Canadian poet and author (born 1953)

Eve Joseph (born 1953) is a Canadian poet and author. She is the author of The Startled Heart (2004), which was shortlisted for the 2005 Dorothy Livesay Poetry Prize, and Quarrels, which won the 2019 Griffin Poetry Prize and was shortlisted for the 2019 ReLit Award for poetry.

Joseph grew up in North Vancouver, British Columbia, and now lives in Victoria. She is married to poet Patrick Friesen.

== Bibliography ==
- 2004: The Startled Heart (Oolichan Books)
- 2010: The Secret Signature of Things (Brick Books)
- 2014: In the Slender Margin (HarperCollins)
- 2018: Quarrels (Anvil Press) (winner of the 2019 Griffin Poetry Prize, shortlisted for the 2019 Dorothy Livesay Poetry Prize)
