= Philip Kevin Paul =

Canadian poet

- Occupation: poet
- Writing career
- Period: 2000s–present
- Notable works: Taking the Names Down from the Hill, Little Hunger
- Notable awards: Dorothy Livesay Poetry Prize

Philip Kevin Paul is a Canadian poet.

His debut collection Taking the Names Down from the Hill won the Dorothy Livesay Poetry Prize in 2004, and his second collection Little Hunger was a shortlisted nominee for the 2009 ReLit Award for poetry and the Governor General's Award for English-language poetry at the 2009 Governor General's Awards.

A former competitive boxer, he is a member of the Saanich First Nation on Vancouver Island. He is a graduate of the University of Victoria. In 2019, Paul co-taught a writing course at the University of Victoria called A Sense of Place.
