= Nora Gould =

Canadian poet

Nora Gould is a Canadian poet. She was a shortlisted finalist for the Gerald Lampert Award in 2013 for her debut poetry collection I see my love more clearly from a distance, and for the Governor General's Award for English-language poetry in 2017 for her second collection Selah.

A 1984 graduate of the University of Guelph in veterinary medicine, Gould resides in Alberta.
