= Tom Wayman =

Canadian author (born 1945)

Thomas Ethan Wayman (born 13 August 1945) is a Canadian writer.

Born in Hawkesbury, Ontario, Wayman has lived most of his life in British Columbia, growing up in Prince Rupert and Vancouver. He was educated at the University of British Columbia and the University of California, Irvine, and has been employed at a number of blue-collar and white-collar jobs in Canada and the U.S., although mainly he taught at the postsecondary level. Much of his academic career was spent in the B.C. community college system. As well, he is a co-founder of two alternative B.C. post-secondary creative writing schools: the Vancouver centre of the Kootenay School of Writing (1984–87) and the writing department of Nelson, B.C.'s Kootenay School of the Arts (1991-2002). He holds Associate Professor Emeritus of English status from the University of Calgary, where he taught 2002–2010. In 2007 he was the Fulbright Visiting Chair in creative writing at Arizona State University, and has also taught at Colorado State University and Wayne State University. He has been writer-in-residence at the University of Windsor, University of Alberta, Simon Fraser University, University of Winnipeg and University of Toronto.

For decades, Wayman has had a particular interest in people writing about their own workplace experiences, including how their jobs affect their lives off work. Besides editing a number of anthologies of work poems, and publishing critical essays on the various dimensions of work-based literature, he was a co-founder of the Vancouver Industrial Writers' Union (1979-1993), a work-writing circle, and has participated in a number of labor arts ventures.

In 2015 Wayman was named by the Vancouver Public Library a Vancouver Literary Landmark, with a plaque on the city's Commercial Drive commemorating his contribution to Vancouver's literary heritage based on his championing of work writing in the 1970s and 1980s. He is a director of the Calgary Spoken Word Festival Society (board president 2003–2012), and of Nelson's Kootenay Literary Society (secretary since 2011), where he serves on the education committee and the Elephant Mountain Literary Festival organizing committee. He helped to found The Kootenay School of Writing.

== Awards ==
His collection My Father's Cup was shortlisted for the Governor General's Award for English-language poetry at the 2003 Governor General's Awards.

He has been a three-time nominee for the Dorothy Livesay Poetry Prize, being shortlisted in 1987 for The Face of Jack Munro, in 2000 for The Colours of the Forest, and in 2003 for My Father's Cup.

In 2022 Wayman received British Columbia's George Woodcock Award for Lifetime Achievement in the literary arts.

In 2026 he won the Purdy Poetry Prize for his poetry collection Out of the Ordinary, and was awarded the Lieutenant Governor's Award for Literary Excellence from the BC and Yukon Book Prizes.

== Bibliography ==
=== Poetry ===
- Waiting for Wayman (Toronto: McClelland & Stewart, 1973)
- For and Against the Moon (Toronto: Macmillan of Canada, 1974)
- Money and Rain (Toronto: Macmillan of Canada, 1975)
- Free Time (Toronto: Macmillan of Canada, 1977)
- A Planet Mostly Sea (Winnipeg: Turnstone, 1979)
- Living on the Ground (Toronto: McClelland & Stewart, 1980)
- Introducing Tom Wayman: Selected Poems 1973-80 (Princeton, N.J.: Ontario Review P, 1980)
- The Nobel Prize Acceptance Speech (Saskatoon: Thistledown, 1981)
- Counting the Hours (Toronto: McClelland & Stewart, 1983)
- The Face of Jack Munro (Madeira Park, BC: Harbour, 1986)
- In a Small House on the Outskirts of Heaven (Madeira Park, BC: Harbour, 1989)
- Did I Miss Anything? Selected Poems 1973-1993 (Madeira Park, BC: Harbour, 1993)
- The Astonishing Weight of the Dead (Vancouver: Polestar, 1994)
- I'll Be Right Back: New and Selected Poems 1980-1996 (Princeton, N.J.: Ontario Review P, 1997)
- The Colours of the Forest (Madeira Park, BC: Harbour, 1999)
- My Father's Cup (Madeira Park, BC: Harbour, 2002)
- High Speed Through Shoaling Water (Madeira Park, BC: Harbour, 2007)
- Dirty Snow (Madeira Park, BC: Harbour 2012)
- Winter's Skin (Fernie, BC: Oolichan, 2013)
- Built to Take It: Selected Poems 1996-2013 (Spokane, WA: Lynx House, 2014)
- The Order in Which We Do Things: The Poetry of Tom Wayman (selected and with an introduction by Owen Percy; Waterloo, ON: Wilfrid Laurier UP, 2014)
- Helpless Angels (2017)
- Watching a Man Break a Dog’s Back: Poems for a Dark Time (2020)
- How Can You Live Here? (2924)
- Out of the Ordinary (2025)

=== Novel ===
- Woodstock Rising (Toronto: Dundurn, 2009)

=== Short fiction ===
- Boundary Country (Saskatoon: Thistledown, 2007)
- A Vain Thing (Winnipeg: Turnstone, 2007)
- The Shadows We Mistake for Love (Madeira Park, BC: Douglas & McIntyre, 2015)

=== Anthologies ===
- Beaton Abbot's Got The Contract: An Anthology of Working Poems (Edmonton: NeWest, 1974)
- A Government Job at Last: An Anthology of Working Poems (Vancouver: MacLeod, 1976)
- Going For Coffee: Poetry on the Job (Madeira Park, BC: Harbour, 1981)
- East of Main: An Anthology of Poems from East Vancouver (co-edited with Calvin Wharton; Vancouver: Pulp, 1989)
- Paperwork: Contemporary Poems from the Job (Madeira Park, BC: Harbour, 1991)
- The Dominion of Love: An Anthology of Canadian Love Poems (Madeira Park, BC:Harbour, 2001)

=== Criticism ===
- Inside Job: Essays on the New Work Writing (Madeira Park, BC: Harbour, 1983)
- A Country Not Considered: Canada, Culture, Work (Toronto: Anansi, 1993)
- Songs Without Price: The Music of Poetry in a Discordant World (Nanaimo, BC: Malaspina University-College, 2008)
