= Raoul Fernandes =

Canadian poet

Raoul Fernandes is a Canadian poet from Vancouver, British Columbia. His debut poetry collection Transmitter and Receiver, published in 2015, won the Dorothy Livesay Poetry Prize in 2016, and was shortlisted for the Gerald Lampert Award and the ReLit Award for Poetry.
