= Stephen Collis =

Canadian poet

Stephen Collis is a Canadian poet and professor. Collis is the author of several books of poetry, including On the Material (Talonbooks, 2010) and three parts of the on-going “Barricades Project”: Anarchive (New Star, 2005), The Commons (Talonbooks, 2008, 2014), and To the Barricades (Talonbooks, 2013). He is also the author of three books of non-fiction: Almost Islands: Phyllis Webb and the Pursuit of the Unwritten (Talonbooks, 2018), Dispatches from the Occupation (Talonbooks, 2012), and Phyllis Webb and the Common Good (Talonbooks, 2007). In 2011, he won the Dorothy Livesay Poetry Prize for the collection On the Material (Talonbooks, 2010). In 2019, he won the Latner Writers' Trust Poetry Prize. He wrote Mine in 2001, Anarchive in 2005 and The Commons in 2008, and was previously shortlisted for the Dorothy Livesay Award in 2006 for Anarchive. He teaches poetry and American literature at Simon Fraser University.

== Works ==
Collis' collection The Commons (2008) draws on the history of English agrarian radicalism and the enclosure of the commons, including the work of John Clare and William Blake. The coda to the volume suggests that the anti-globalization movement sought a return to the commons motivated by the Zapatista Army of National Liberation's communiqués from the Lacandon Jungle.

His work since 2008 has turned towards environmental politics and practices of commoning among indigenous peoples. Once in Blockadia (2016) includes work in opposition to the Trans Mountain pipeline and works placing William Wordsworth's work and the tradition of the sublime in connection with 21st-century forms of extractivism and the photography of Edward Burtynsky. Once in Blockadia was shortlisted for the 2017 George Ryga Award for Social Awareness.

Collis' poem "Golfing St. George's Hill with Sean Bonney" (2016) describes a visit with the poet Sean Bonney to the golf course at St George's Hill, which was the site of an occupation by the Diggers in 1649 and today is part of a gated community, and draws on the proclamation made there by Gerrard Winstanley. Daniel Eltringham has argued that Collis' work, as well as that of Bonney and others, is part of a broader turn in 21st-century poetry to themes of commons and enclosure.

A History of the Theories of Rain was a shortlisted finalist for the Governor General's Award for English-language poetry at the 2021 Governor General's Awards.
