= Lyle Neff =

Canadian poet and journalist

- Born: 1969 (age 56–57); Prince George, British Columbia
- Occupations: Poet, journalist
- Writing career
- Notable works: Ivanhoe Station, Full Magpie Dodge, Bizarre Winery Tragedy

Lyle Neff (born 1969) is a Canadian poet and journalist based in Vancouver, British Columbia.

Born in Prince George, British Columbia, Neff is the author of three books of poetry published by Anvil Press. He has also written essays, cultural journalism, and literary criticism for various Canadian publications, ranging from the national newspaper The Globe and Mail to literary journals such as Sub-Terrain.

Neff is known for his outspoken views on Canadian nationalism and his controversial "Three Laws of Honest Dominion Belletrism," which he published in 2003 in Monarchist magazine. The Laws are:

- 1. Don't ask for subsidies from the Canadian people.
- 2. Don't teach.
- 3. Don't work for Americans.

== Bibliography ==
- Ivanhoe Station, Vancouver: Anvil, 1997.
- Full Magpie Dodge, Vancouver: Anvil, 2000.
- Bizarre Winery Tragedy, Vancouver: Anvil, 2005.
