= Christopher D. Patton =

Canadian poet (born 1969)

Christopher Patton (born 1969) is a Canadian poet.

Patton received a $10,000 writing grant from the Canada Council for the Arts in 1998, and has written at Yaddo and the MacDowell Colony. Characteristic subjects in Patton's writing include nature, spiritual experience, the connection between those two, and what it means to see. His poetry has been published in literary journals such as The Paris Review, The Antioch Review, Western Humanities Review, FIELD, and The Fiddlehead. Some of his poems were published in The New Canon: An Anthology of Canadian Poetry (Carmine Starnino, 2006).

Patton's children's book Jack Pine, illustrated by Cybèle Young, was published in July 2007 by Groundwood Books. In 2008 the Vancouver Opera commissioned a children's opera based on Jack Pine, to be performed by the Vancouver Opera in Schools touring ensemble. The opera, composed by British Columbian songwriter Veda Hille, toured British Columbia schools throughout 2009.

Patton was awarded the Bernard F. Connors Prize for Poetry for his "Broken Ground", chosen "the finest poem over 200 lines published in The Paris Review" in 2000. "Broken Ground" was included in Patton's first book of poetry, Ox, which was published by Véhicule Press in September 2007. Ox was selected as a finalist for the 2008 Dorothy Livesay Poetry Prize.
