= Patrick Lane (poet) =

Canadian poet (1939–2019)

Patrick Lane (March 26, 1939 – March 7, 2019) was a Canadian poet. He had written in several other genres, including essays, short stories, and was the author of the novels Red Dog, Red Dog and Deep River Night.

== Biography ==
Born in Nelson, British Columbia, he attended high school in Vernon and had no further formal education. He first began writing poetry seriously in 1960. During his twenties, he held a series of jobs in the logging industry in the northern part of the province, working as a choker, truck driver, Industrial First Aid man, sawmill worker, and salesman, among others. In 1965, he moved to Vancouver and began to connect with other poets of his generation.

Lane, Bill Bissett and Seymour Mayne founded the small-press publisher Very Stone House in 1966.

In 1968, Lane's first marriage ended and he moved to South America to dedicate himself completely to writing. When he returned, he remarried and established a home in the Okanagan Valley in 1972. In 1974, he and his wife moved to the Sunshine Coast.

After a second divorce in 1978, he became Writer-in-Residence at University of Manitoba, where he met fellow poet Lorna Crozier. That same year, Lane won the Governor General's Award for his collection Poems, New and Selected.

Lane lived for many years with Crozier in Saanichton, British Columbia, where he tended a garden of 0.5 acres (0.20 ha) which was featured on the television program Recreating Eden, and which he wrote about in the memoir There is a Season.

He participated in Dial-A-Poem Montreal from 1985 to 1987.

From 1986 to 1990, Lane taught creative writing and Canadian literature courses at the University of Saskatchewan in Saskatoon, Saskatchewan, and later taught at the University of Victoria in Victoria, British Columbia from 1991 to 2004. When he retired from formal teaching, he was still an adjunct professor at UVic and frequently led retreats and workshops for writers. In 2007, he was awarded the fourth annual Lieutenant Governor's Award for Literary Excellence for his lifetime contribution to literature in British Columbia. His novel Red Dog, Red Dog was published in 2008.

A recovering alcoholic and cocaine user, Lane wrote about his struggles with dependency in Addicted: Notes From the Belly of the Beast, which he co-edited with Crozier, and in There is a Season.

On November 21, 2014, Governor General David Johnston presented Patrick Lane with the Order of Canada, recognizing his more than 50 years of contribution to Canadian poetry and literature. His final collection of poems, Washita, was nominated for the 2015 Governor General's Literary Award for poetry.

He had five children, three from his first marriage and two from his second. He was the brother of poet Red Lane. He lived the latter part of his life in the Victoria, BC area and died on March 7, 2019, aged 79 .

== Bibliography ==
- Letters from the Savage Mind – 1966
- Separations – 1969
- "Calgary City Jail" – 1969
- "On the Street" – 1970
- Mountain Oysters – 1971
- The Sun Has Begun to Eat the Mountain – 1972
- "Passing into Storm" – 1973
- Beware the Months of Fire – 1974
- "certs" – 1974
- Unborn Things: South American Poems – 1975
- "Albino Pheasants" – 1977
- Poems, New and Selected – 1978 (winner of the 1978 Governor General's Award)
- No Longer Two People – 1979 (with Lorna Crozier)
- The Measure – 1980
- Old Mother – 1982
- Woman in the Dust – 1983
- A Linen Crow, A Caftan Magpie – 1984
- Selected Poems – 1987
- Milford and Me – 1989
- Winter – 1989 (nominated for a Governor General's Award)
- Mortal Remains – 1991 (nominated for a Governor General's Award)
- How Do You Spell Beautiful? And Other Stories – 1992
- "Praise" – 1993
- Too Spare, Too Fierce – 1995 (winner of the Dorothy Livesay Poetry Prize)
- Selected Poems – 1997
- The Bare Plum of Winter Rain – 2000 (nominated for the Dorothy Livesay Poetry Prize)
- There is a Season – 2004 (nominated for the Hubert Evans Non-Fiction Prize)

published in the US as What the Stones Remember: A Life Rediscovered 2004 (nominated for Barnes & Noble Discover Great New Writers Award for Non-fiction)

- Go Leaving Strange – 2005 – (nominated for the Dorothy Livesay Poetry Prize)
- Red Dog, Red Dog – 2008
- Witness: Selected Poems 1962–2010 – 2010
- The Collected Poems of Patrick Lane – 2011
- Washita – 2014
- Deep River Night - 2018
- The Quiet in Me – 2022

=== Edited with Lorna Crozier ===
- Breathing Fire – 1995
- Addicted: Notes from the Belly of the Beast – 2001
- Breathing Fire 2 – 2004
