= Barry McKinnon =

Canadian poet (1944–2023)

Barry Benjamin McKinnon (1944 – October 30, 2023) was a Canadian poet.

Born in Calgary, Alberta, he taught English and Creative Writing at the College of New Caledonia in Prince George, British Columbia, one of the original 19 faculty appointed by the College in 1969. McKinnon died from multiple organ failure on October 30, 2023.

== Bibliography ==
- The Golden Daybreak Hair. Toronto, ON: Aliquondo Press, 1967.
- Cat. Toronto, ON: Ganglia Press, 1970.
- The Carcasses of Spring. Vancouver, BC: Talonbooks, 1971.
- Stamp Collection. Vancouver, BC: Blewintmentpress, 1971.
- I Wanted to Say Something. Prince George, BC: Caledonia Writing Series, 1975.
- Death of a Lyric Poet. Prince George, BC: Caledonia Writing Series, 1975.
- Songs & Speeches. Prince George, BC: Caledonia Writing Series, 1976.
- Sex at Thirty One. Prince George, BC: Caledonia Writing Series, 1977.
- The The. (Fragments). Prince George, BC: Repository /Gorse Press, 1979.
- The The. Toronto, ON: Coach House Press, 1980. (Nominated for the 1981 Governor General's Award)
- Thoughts/Sketches. North Vancouver, BC: Tatlow/Gorse, 1985.
- B.C. Poets & Print. Toronto, ON: Open Letter, 1988.
- I Wanted to Say Something. Red Deer, AB: Red Deer College Press, 1990.
- Pulplog. Prince George, BC: Caitlin Press, 1991.
- Four Realities: poets from northern BC. Prince George, BC: Caitlin Press, 1992.
- Arrythmia. Prince George, BC: Gorse Press, 1994.
- The Centre. Prince George, BC: Caitlin Press, 1995.
- it cant be said. Vandehoof, BC: Imp Press, 2000.
- in the millennium. Vancouver, BC: New Star Books, 2009.
- Chairs in the Time Machine. Prince George, BC: Gorse Press, 2012.
- Manrootgaze. Ottawa, ON: Canadian Small Change Association, 2016.

== Awards ==
- bp Nichol Chap-Book Award, 2004. Bolivia/Peru
- bp Nichol Chap-Book Award, 1995. Arrythmia
- Dorothy Livesay Poetry Prize, 1992. Pulplog
- Governor General's Literary Award, 1981 (finalist) The The
