= Susan Holbrook =

Canadian poet

- Born: January 16th 1967
- Occupation: poet
- Children: Elise Holbrook, Rendel Arner, Sammy
- Writing career
- Period: 1990s-present
- Notable work: Throaty Wipes

Susan Holbrook is a Canadian poet, whose collection Throaty Wipes was shortlisted for the Governor General's Award for English-language poetry at the 2016 Governor General's Awards.

Her debut poetry collection, misled, was published in 1999 while she was a graduate student at the University of Calgary. It was shortlisted for the Pat Lowther Award and the Alberta Writers Guild's Stephan G. Stephansson Award for Poetry. She then began teaching literature and creative writing at the University of Windsor, and followed up with Good Egg Bad Seed in 2004 and Joy Is So Exhausting in 2009. The latter collection was a shortlisted Trillium Award finalist in 2010.

She has also published the poetry textbook How to Read (and Write About) Poetry (2015), and wrote the play Why Do I Feel Guilty in the Changeroom at Britannia Pool? (2002).

Her 2021 collection Ink Earl was shortlisted for the 2022 ReLit Award for poetry.

== Works ==
- misled (1999)
- Why Do I Feel Guilty in the Changeroom at Britannia Pool? (2002)
- Good Egg Bad Seed (2004)
- Joy Is So Exhausting (2009)
- How to Read (and Write About) Poetry (2015)
- Throaty Wipes (2016)
- Ink Earl (2021)
