= Joe Denham =

Canadian poet and fiction writer

- Occupation: poet
- Writing career
- Period: 2000s–present
- Notable work: Regeneration Machine
- Notable awards: Canadian Authors Association Poetry Award (2016)

Joe Denham is a Canadian poet and fiction writer. He is most noted for his 2016 collection Regeneration Machine, which won the Canadian Authors Association Award for Poetry and was shortlisted for the Governor General's Award for English-language poetry at the 2016 Governor General's Awards.

He published his first poetry chapbook, Night Haul, Morning Set, in 2002. The collection was then included in his first commercially published book, Flux, the following year. He has since published the poetry collections Windstorm and Regeneration Machine, and the novel The Year of Broken Glass. Some sources have also incorrectly credited him with the novel Sins of the Fishermen, which was in fact written by an unrelated American lawyer.

Denham resides in Halfmoon Bay, British Columbia, where he has worked as a commercial fisherman. He studied creative writing at the University of Victoria.

== Works ==
=== Poetry ===
- Night Haul, Morning Set (2002)
- Flux (2003)
- Windstorm (2010)
- Regeneration Machine (2016)

=== Fiction ===
- The Year of Broken Glass (2011)
