= Diana Hartog =

Canadian poet and fiction writer (born 1942)

- Born: October 25, 1942 (age 83); Palo Alto, California
- Occupations: poet, novelist
- Writing career
- Period: 1980s–present
- Notable works: Matinee Light, Candy from Strangers, The Photographer's Sweethearts

Diana Hartog (born 1942 in Palo Alto, California) is a Canadian poet and fiction writer. She won the Gerald Lampert Award in 1983 for her poetry collection Matinee Light, and the Dorothy Livesay Poetry Prize in 1987 for Candy from Strangers.

She was also a shortlisted nominee for the Journey Prize in 1991 for her short story "Theories of Grief", and for the Dorothy Livesay Prize in 1993 for Polite to Bees: A Bestiary.

She published the novel The Photographer's Sweethearts in 1996, and a new poetry collection, Ink Monkey, in 2006.

She lives in New Denver, British Columbia.
