= Susan McCaslin =

Canadian poet (born 1947)

Susan Elizabeth McCaslin
- Born: 3 June 1947 (age 79)
- Education: University of British Columbia (1984) Simon Fraser University (1973)
- Occupations: Poet, Writer, Educator

Susan Elizabeth McCaslin (born June 3, 1947) is a Canadian poet and writer.

== Biography ==
McCaslin lives in Fort Langley, British Columbia. She received an M.A. in English (thesis: Edgar Allan Poe) at Simon Fraser University, 1973; and a Ph.D. in English (dissertation: Vernon Watkins) at University of British Columbia, 1984.

She taught English and Creative Writing at Douglas College in British Columbia from 1984 to 2007. She is a retired Faculty Emerita who has authored fourteen volumes of poetry. Her most recent volume is Painter, Poet, Mountain: After Cézanne (Quattro Books, 2016). Her previous volume, Demeter Goes Skydiving (University of Alberta Press, 2011), was shortlisted for the BC Book Prize and the winner of the Alberta Book Publishing Award for 2012. She is an essayist, editor of poetry anthologies, children's author, memoirist, and creative non-fiction writer.

== Literary awards (selected) ==
- The Burnaby Writers' Society Annual Poetry Contest, Oct. 1995, first-place winner.
- Mother Tongue Press's Annual Chapbook Competition, 1997, for Letters to William Blake. (judged by P.K. Page)
- Burnaby Writers' Society Poetry Competition, 2005, first-place winner.
- The second annual poetry contest sponsored by Presence: an International Journal of Spiritual Direction, grand prize poetry winner, 2006.
- First place winner in the 18th Annual Literary Writes Poetry Competition of the Federation of BC Writers, 2006.
- Finalist for the Dorothy Livesay Award (BC Book Prize, 2012) for Demeter Goes Skydiving (University of Alberta Press, 2011).
- Alberta Book Publishing Award (The Robert Kroetsch Poetry Award) for Demeter Goes Skydiving (University of Alberta Press), 2012.

== Works ==
=== Poetry ===
- Conversing with Paradise. Vancouver, B.C.: Golden Eagle Press, 1986.
- Locutions. Victoria, B.C.: Ekstasis Editions, 1995.
- Light Housekeeping. Victoria, B.C.: Ekstasis Editions, 1997.
- Veil/Unveil. Toronto: The Saint Thomas Poetry Series, 1997.
- Into the Open. Port Moody, B.C.: Golden Eagle Press, 1999.
- Flying Wounded. Gainesville, Florida: The University Press of Florida, 2000.
- The Altering Eye. Ottawa, Ontario: Borealis Press, 2000.
- Common Longing: The Teresa Poems and A Canticle for Mary and Martha. New York: Mellen Poetry Press, 2001.
- At the Mercy Seat. Vancouver, B.C.: Ronsdale Press, 2003.
- A Plot of Light. Lantzville, B.C.: Oolichan Books, 2004.
- Lifting the Stone. Hamilton, Ontario: Seraphim Editions, Oct. 2007.
- Demeter Goes Skydiving. University of Alberta Press, 2011.
- The Disarmed Heart. Toronto, Ontario: The St. Thomas Poetry Series, 2014.
- Painter, Poet, Mountain: After Cézanne. Toronto, Ontario: Quattro Books, 2016.
- Into the Open: Poems New and Selected. Toronto, Ontario: Inanna Publications, 2017.
- Heart Work. Victoria, B.C.: Ekstasis Editions, 2020.
- Consider. Thornhill, Ontario: Aeolus House, 2023.
- Field Play. Victoria, B.C.: Ekstasis Editions, 2024.

=== Non-fiction ===
- Arousing the Spirit: Provocative Writings. Kelowna, British Columbia: Copperhouse, an imprint of Wood Lake Books, 2011.

=== Chapbooks (selected) ===
- Letters to William Blake. Salt Spring Island: Mother Tongue Press, 1997. First-place winner of the Mother Tongue Chapbook competition for 1997, judged by P.K. Page.
- Oracular Heart. The Hawthorne Poetry Series. Victoria, B.C.: Reference West, 1999.
- Persephone Tours the Underground. North Vancouver, B.C.: The Alfred Gustav Press, 2009.
- effortful / effortless: after Cézanne. North Vancouver, B.C.: The Alfred Gustav Press, 2015.
- Cosmic Egg. North Vancouver, B.C.: The Alfred Gustav Poetry Press, 2021.
- Sentient Stones. Salt Spring Island, B.C.: Raven Chapbooks, 2023.

=== Children's books ===
- Thinking About God. Mystic, Connecticut: Twenty-Third Publications, 1994.

=== Editor of poetry anthologies ===
- A Matter of Spirit: Recovery of the Sacred in Contemporary Canadian Poetry. Victoria, B.C.: Ekstasis Editions, 1998.
- Poetry and Spiritual Practice: Selections from Contemporary Canadian Poets. Toronto: The St. Thomas Poetry Series, 2002.
