= David Donnell =

Canadian poet and writer (1939–2020)

- Born: October 13, 1939; St. Marys, Ontario, Canada
- Died: May 23, 2020 (aged 81)
- Occupations: Writer, Poet

David Donnell (13 October 1939 – 23 May 2020) was a Canadian poet and writer. Born in St. Marys, Ontario, Donnell moved to Toronto, Ontario in 1958 before publishing his first book. Poems (1961), During this period Donnell frequented the Bohemian Embassy, where Margaret Atwood, Gwendolyn MacEwen, Milton Acorn, and other poets established their reputations. In conjunction with John Robert Colombo, Donnell printed Atwood's first book Double Persephone (1961) Donnell Published The Blue Sky poems 1974-77 examining the relationships of his life from an oblique perspective, then Dangerous Crossings (1980) followed by A Poem About Poland. Donnell won the Canadian Comic Poet Award in 1981, and the 1983 Governor General's Award for English language poetry for his collection Settlements. Donnell continued publishing with Water Street days (1989) where he examines his past and his childhood; the poems are narrative confessions; and China blues (1992). Donnell's poetry offers perspectives about city life and the stresses and ironic staples of urban life. Donnell's poetry is known for its escalating fascination with prose fiction that becomes more dominant in the final sections of China Blues and Water Street Days, and becoming an important feature in his publishing of Dancing In The Dark (1996).

David Donnell also received the Therafields Chapbook Award in 1986 and the City of Toronto Book Award in 1993.

Donnell died on 23 May 2020, at the age of 81.

== Works ==
- Poems (1969)
- The Blue Sky (1977) ISBN 0-88753-031-1 / 0-88753-032-X
- Dangerous Crossings (1980) ISBN 0-88753-064-8
- Hemingway in Toronto (1982) ISBN 0-88753-090-7
- Settlements (1983) ISBN 0-7710-2849-0
- The Blue Ontario Hemingway Boat Race (1985) ISBN 0-88910-302-X.
- The Natural History of Water (1986) ISBN 0-920901-01-8
- Water Street Days (1989) ISBN 0-7710-2848-2
- China Blues: Poems and Stories (1992) ISBN 0-7710-2843-1
- crab cakes w/blueberries (1995) ISBN 0-921688-10-5
- Dancing in the Dark (1996) ISBN 0-7710-2833-4
- Sometimes a Great Notion (2004) ISBN 978-0-7710-2826-7
