= Sharon Thesen =

Canadian poet (born 1946)

Sharon Thesen (born 1946 in Tisdale, Saskatchewan) is a Canadian poet who lives in Lake Country, British Columbia. She teaches at University of British Columbia Okanagan.

In 2003, Thesen was a judge for the Griffin Poetry Prize.

== Selected works ==
- Artemis Hates Romance, Toronto: Coach House Press, 1980
- Radio New France Radio, Vancouver: Slug Press, 1981
- Holding the Pose, Toronto: Coach House Press, 1983
- Confabulations, Fernie, BC: Oolichan Books, 1984 (nominated for a Governor General's Award)
- The Beginning of the Long Dash, Toronto: Coach House Press, 1987 (nominated for a Governor General's Award)
- The Pangs of Sunday, Toronto: McClelland & Stewart, 1990
- Aurora, Vancouver: Talonbooks, 1995
- News and Smoke: Selected Poems, Vancouver: Talonbooks, 1999
- A Pair of Scissors, Toronto: House of Anansi Press, 2000 (winner of the Pat Lowther Award)
- Weeping Willow, Vancouver: Nomados, 2005
- The Good Bacteria, Toronto: House of Anansi Press, 2006 (nominated for the 2006 Governor General's Award for poetry and the Dorothy Livesay Poetry Prize)
- Oyama Pink Shale, Toronto: House of Anansi Press, 2011
- The Receiver, Vancouver: New Star Books, 2017
- The Wig-Maker w/Janet Gallant, Vancouver: New Star Books, 2021
- Refabulations, ed. Erin Moure, Vancouver: Talon Books, 2023
