= Patricia Young =

Canadian poet, and short story writer (born 1954)

Patricia Young (born 1954) is a Canadian poet, and short story writer. She has won numerous poetry competitions and literary awards, including the League of Canadian Poets National Poetry Competition and Pat Lowther Award.

== Poetry ==
- Travelling the Floodwaters. Turnstone Press. 1983. ISBN 978-0-88801-082-7.
- All I Ever Needed Was a Beautiful Room. Oolichan Books. 1987. ISBN 978-0-88982-073-9.
- The Mad and Beautiful Mothers. Ragweed Press. 1989. ISBN 978-0-920304-79-2.
- Those Were the Mermaid Days. Ragweed Press. 1991. ISBN 0-921556-14-4.
- More Watery Still. Anansi. 1993. ISBN 978-0-88784-541-3.
- What I Remember From My Time on Earth: poems. Anansi. 1997. ISBN 978-0-88784-592-5.
- Ruin and Beauty. House of Anansi Press. 2000. ISBN 978-0-88784-649-6.
- Here Come the Moonbathers. Biblioasis. 2008. ISBN 978-1-897231-43-2.
- An Auto-Erotic History of Swings. Sono Nis. 2010. ISBN 978-1-55039-178-7.
- Pilgrimage: Love Poems. JackPine Press. 2011. ISBN 978-0-9865426-7-1.
- Stunned. Leaf Press. 2011. ISBN 978-1-926655-35-2.
- Amateurs At Love. The Alfred Gustav Press. 2012. ISBN 978-0-9877910-3-0.

== Short stories ==
- Airstream. Biblioasis. 2006. ISBN 978-1-897231-01-2.

== Anthologies ==
- A Walk by the Seine, Canadian Poets on Paris. (Black Moss Press, 1996)
- Anthology of Magazine Verse and Yearbook of American Poetry. (Monitor Book Co., 1995/96).
- Making Connections: Literacy from a Feminist Perspective. (Canadian Congress for Learning Opportunities for Women, 1996)

== Awards and nominations ==
- 1987: Dorothy Livesay Poetry Prize for All I Ever Needed Was A Beautiful Room
- 1989: Pat Lowther Award for The Mad And Beautiful Mothers
- 1993: Governor General's Award nominee for More Watery Still
- 1997: B.C. Book Prize for What I Remember From My Time On Earth
- 2000: Governor General's Award nominee for Ruin & Beauty
- 2000: Butler Prize, shortlist for Airstream
- 2006: Airstream included on Globe and Mail's list of best 100 books of the year
- 2006: Meltcalf-Rooke Award, for Airstream
- 2009: Butler Prize, shortlist for Here Come the Moonbathers

== Prizes: poetry ==
Year	Prize	Result
1987	Federation of B. C. Writers, Literary Rites Competition	First
1988	National Magazine Award	First
1988	C.B.C. Literary Competition	Second
1988	League of Canadian Poets National Poetry Competition	Co-winner
1989	Aya Press Tenth Anniversary Literary Competition	First
1993	League of Canadian Poets National Poetry Contest	Second
1995	Grain Prose Poem Contest	Co-winner
1996	League of Canadian Poets National Poetry Contest	First
1996	CV2 Annual Poetry Contest	First
1996	Room of One's Own Poetry Contest	
1997	League of Canadian Poets National Poetry Contest	Second
1997	George Woodcock Poetry Contest, Canada India Village Aid	First
1997	The Stephen Leacock Poetry Award: The Orillia International Poetry Festival	
1998	Mothertongue Chapbook Competition	Second
1998	Grain Prose Poem Prize	Co-winner
1998	Prairie Fire, Bliss Carmen Award	First
1999	Grain Postcard Story Prize	Co-winner
1999	National Magazine Award for Poetry	Silver
2007	Room of One's Own, Poetry Contest	Second
2008	Prairie Fire	Second
2008	Grain, Prose Poem Prize	Co-winner
2008	Arc's Poem of the Year Contest	First
2008	Room of One's Own Poetry Contest	Second
2009	Fiddlehead Poetry Contest	Honourable mention
2009	C. B. C. Literary Awards	Finalist
2009	Arc's Poem of the Year Contest	First
2009	Bridport Poetry Prize (UK)	Shortlist
2009, 2011	Malahat Review Long Poem Competition	Shortlist
2009, 2012	Malahat Review Open Season Award	Shortlist
2010	C.B.C. Literary Awards	Finalist
2010	Prism International Poetry Competition	Honourable Mention
2010	The Antigonish Review's Great Blue Heron Contest	Third
2010	The New Quarterly, Occasional Verse Contest	Second
2010	The Confederation Poet's Prize	
2011	C.B.C. Literary Awards	Finalist
2011	The Antigonish Review's Great Blue Heron Contest	First
2011	Room of One's Own Poetry Contest	First
2011	Montreal International Poetry Prize	Shortlist
2012	Malahat Review, Open Season Award	Shortlist
2012	Prism International Poetry Competition	Third

== Prizes: fiction ==
- Other Voices Fiction Award, First Prize, 2000
- Matrix, First Prize, 2001
- Fiddlehead Fiction Contest, Honorable Mention 2001
- Other Voices Fiction Award, First Prize, 2001
- Fiddlehead Fiction Prize, Honorable Mention, 2002
- Room of One's Own Fiction Prize, First Prize, 2003
- Fiddlehead Fiction Prize, Honorable Mention, 2004
- Journey Prize, 2004, Short-list
- This Magazine's Great Canadian Literary Hunt, Second Prize, 2006

== Personal life ==
Young was born in Victoria, British Columbia. She married to writer Terence Young. Their daughter, Clea Young, is also a writer, whose debut short story collection Teardown was published in 2016.
