= John Pass (poet) =

Canadian poet (born 1947)

John Pass (born 1947 in Sheffield, England) is a Canadian poet. He has lived in Canada since 1953, and was educated at the University of British Columbia.

He has published 21 books of poetry since 1971. His book Stumbling in the Bloom won the 2006 Governor General's Award for English poetry. His recent book "crawlspace" (Harbour Publishing, 2011) won the Dorothy Livesay Prize (BC Best Book Award in Poetry) in 2012.

Pass taught English at Capilano University from 1975 to 2007. He lives on BC's Sunshine Coast near Sakinaw Lake with his wife, poet, essayist and novelist Theresa Kishkan

Four of his books of poetry form a linked quartet under the overall title, "At Large":

- The Hour's Acropolis (Harbour Publishing, 1991)
- Radical Innocence (Harbour Publishing, 1994)
- Water Stair (Oolichan Books, 2000)
- Stumbling in the Bloom (Oolichan Books, 2005)

== Works ==
- Taking Place, 1971
- The Kenojuak Prints, 1973
- AIR 18, 1973 (ISSN 0044-6947)
- Port of Entry, 1975
- Love's Confidence, 1976
- Blossom: An Accompaniment, 1978
- There Go the Cars, 1979 (ISBN 0-920580-02-5)
- An Arbitrary Dictionary, 1984 (ISBN 0-88910-284-8)
- Rugosa, 1991 (ISBN 978-1-895362-24-4)
- The Hour's Acropolis, 1991 (ISBN 1-55017-043-0) shortlisted for the 1993 Dorothy Livesay Poetry Prize
- Radical Innocence, 1994 (ISBN 1-55017-107-0)
- Mud Bottom, 1996
- Water Stair, 2000 (ISBN 0-88982-179-8) shortlisted for the 2000 Governor General's Literary Award for Poetry and for the 2001 Dorothy Livesay Poetry Prize
- nowrite.doc, 2004
- Twinned Towers, 2005
- Stumbling in the Bloom, 2005 (ISBN 0-88982-201-8) winner of the 2006 Governor General's Literary Award for Poetry
- Self Storage, 2011 (ISBN 978-1-926655-26-0)
- crawlspace, 2011 (ISBN 978-1-55017-519-6) winner of the 2012 Dorothy Livesay Prize
- Forecast (Selected Early Poems 1970 - 1990), 2015 (ISBN 9781550177312)
- "This Was the River", 2019, (ISBN 9781550178753)
- "Vetrna zvonkohra" (Wind Chime) Jiri Mesic trans. 2020, protimluv, Ostrava, Czech Republic (ISBN 978-80-87485-82-8)
