= Garry Thomas Morse =

Canadian poet and novelist

- Occupation: poet
- Writing career
- Period: 2000s–present
- Notable works: Discovery Passages, Prairie Harbour

Garry Thomas Morse is a Canadian poet and novelist. He is a two-time nominee for the Governor General's Award for English-language poetry, at the 2011 Governor General's Awards for Discovery Passages and at the 2016 Governor General's Awards for Prairie Harbour, and a two-time ReLit Award nominee for his fiction works Minor Episodes / Major Ruckus in 2013 and Rogue Cells / Carbon Harbour in 2014.

He is of Kwakwaka'wakw descent, and Discovery Passages centred on the historical banning of the traditional Kwakwaka'wakw potlatch and its cultural and social impact on the First Nation.

He has worked as an editor for Talonbooks and Signature Editions. Originally from British Columbia, he is currently based in Winnipeg.

Morse was selected as Saskatoon Public Library's Writer in Residence for 2023/24.

== Works ==
=== Poetry ===
- Transversals for Orpheus (LINEBooks, 2006)
- Streams (LINEBooks, 2007)
- After Jack (Talonbooks, 2010)
- Discovery Passages (Talonbooks, 2011)
- Prairie Harbour (Talonbooks, 2016)
- Safety Sand (Talonbooks, 2017)
- Scofflaw (Anvil Press, 2021)

=== Fiction ===
- Death in Vancouver (2009)
- Minor Episodes / Major Ruckus (2012)
- Rogue Cells / Carbon Harbour (2013)
- Minor Expectations (2014)
- Yams Do Not Exist (2020)
