= Don McKay (poet) =

Canadian poet, editor, and educator (born 1942)

Don McKay CM
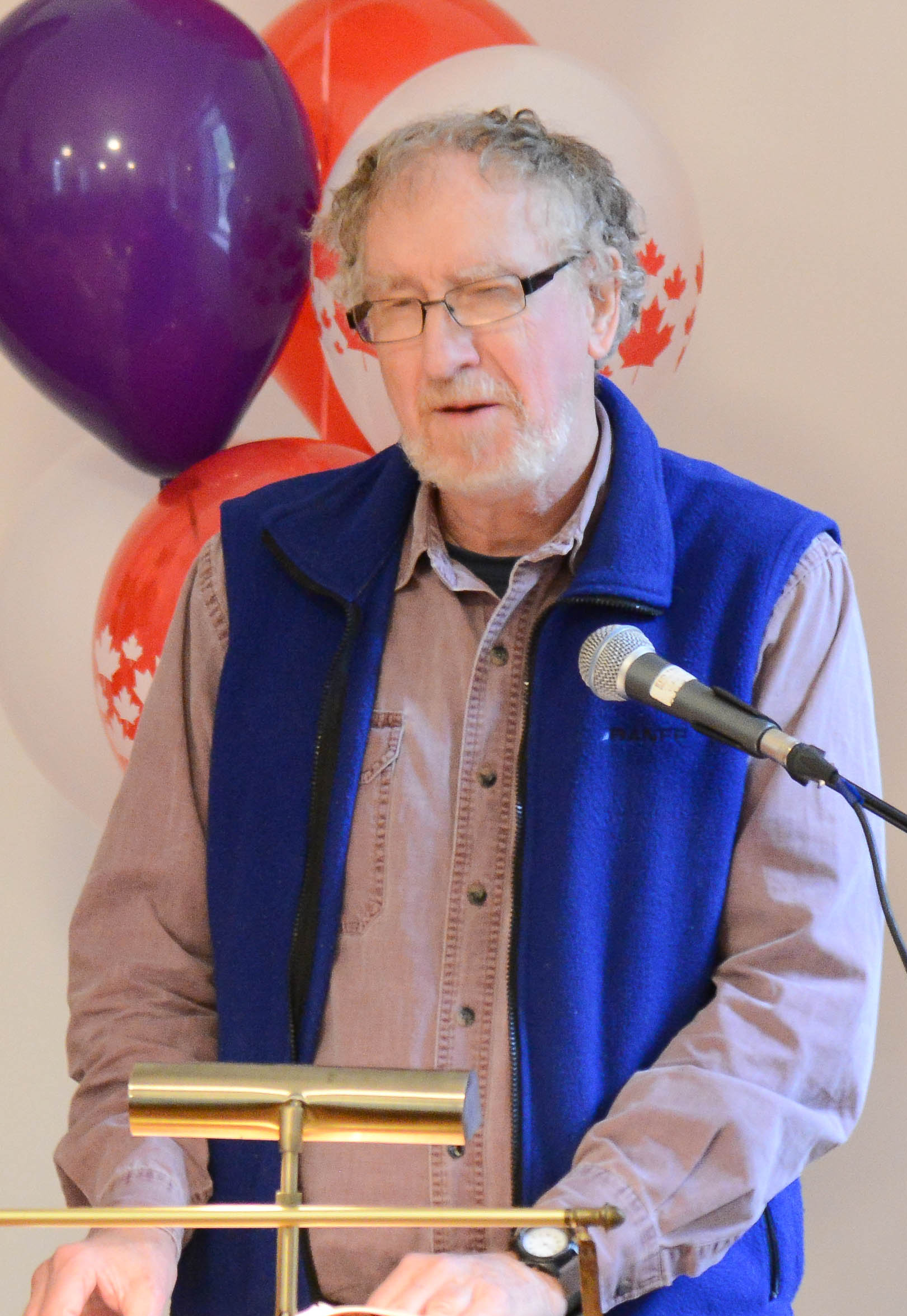
- Don McKay at the Eden Mills Writers Festival in 2015
- Born: 1942 (age 83–84)
- Education: University of Western Ontario; University of Wales
- Occupations: Poet, essayist, editor

Don McKay CM (born 1942) is a Canadian poet, editor, and educator.

== Life ==
McKay was born in Owen Sound, Ontario and raised in Cornwall. McKay was educated at the University of Western Ontario and the University of Wales, where he earned his PhD in 1971, with a dissertation on the poetry of Dylan Thomas. He taught creative writing and English for 27 years in universities including the University of Western Ontario and the University of New Brunswick. In 2008, he was made a Member of the Order of Canada. McKay has lived in southwestern Ontario, New Brunswick, Vancouver Island and Newfoundland.

== Poetic career ==
McKay is the author of twelve books of poetry, including Birding, or Desire (1986), Apparatus (1997) and Paradoxides (2012). He has twice won the Governor General's Award, for Night Field (1991) and Another Gravity (2000). In June 2007, he won the Griffin Poetry Prize for Strike/Slip (2006). Beginning in 2002, he has also published five books of non-fiction prose, mixing nature writing, thoughts on poetics, and philosophical and environmental reflections. Critical discourse has included him in a group of Canadian poets known as the 'thinking and singing poets,' along with Robert Bringhurst, Dennis Lee, Tim Lilburn and Jan Zwicky.

McKay, published since 1973, is described as ' a poet with a patient eye, an acute arresting ear, over flowing with details of ornithology, botany, weather, industry, books and music; nuanced descriptions, philosophical phrasing, folksy idiom. madcap humour and elegy'. Others, consider 'awe, astonishment and wonder to be the keynotes of McKay's poems and poetics' and that his prime subject matter to be 'the workings of the human mind'.

McKay has also made a wide impression as a teacher and editor. He was the co-founder and a manuscript reader for Brick Books ., one of Canada's leading poetry presses, and was editor of the literary journal The Fiddlehead from 1991 to 1996. He has participated in the Sage Hill Writing experience in Saskatchewan and was associate director for poetry at the Banff Centre for the Arts Writing Studio. He has mentored many fellow poets, including Ken Babstock, Marlene Cookshaw, Barbara Colebrook Peace, Michael Redhill, Richard Kelly Kemick, Anne Simpson, and Sue Sinclair.

McKay is an avid birdwatcher; and bird themes and flight are dominant topics in his poetry. In Birding, or Desire (1983), the quirky protagonist is never far from his Birds of Canada hobbyist's field guide. McKay's passion for birds and nature percolates throughout all of his work, and some consider 'McKay's preferred environment is located in the natural world'. McKay himself sees his writing as "nature poetry in a time of environmental crisis." McKay's poems are ecologically centred, inspired by the conflict between inspiration and spirit, instinct and knowledge.

In his book of poetic philosophy Vis à Vis: Field Notes on Poetry & Wilderness, McKay details many of his beliefs on metaphor, wildness, and the homing instinct. In that book, his definitive 1993 essay 'Baler Twine' describes those moments 'before wrestling with words and music ', a 'state of mind ', a preparedness, which he labels as 'poetic attention'; and further describes as a 'sort of readiness ', a 'form of knowing'. McKay also touches on his other main poetic themes of 'Wilderness', 'Home', and 'Matériel' (material existence).

== Works ==
=== Poetry ===
- Air Occupies Space (1973)
- Long Sault (1975)
- Lependu (1978)
- Lightning Ball Bait (1980)
- Birding, or Desire (1983) (nominated for a Governor General's Award)
- Sanding Down this Rocking Chair on a Windy Night (1987)
- Night Field (1991) (winner of the 1991 Governor General's Award for poetry)
- Apparatus (1997) (nominated for a Governor General's Award)
- Another Gravity (2000) (shortlisted for the 2001 Canadian Griffin Poetry Prize)
- Varves (2003; chapbook)
- Camber (2004) (shortlisted for the 2005 Canadian Griffin Poetry Prize)
- Strike/Slip (2006) (winner of the 2007 Canadian Griffin Poetry Prize and the Dorothy Livesay Poetry Prize)
- Field Marks: The Poetry of Don McKay edited by Méira Cook (2006)
- Songs for the Songs of Birds, audiobook (2008)
- Leaf to leaf-Foglio a foglia (Italian translation by Sara Fruner and Filippo Mariano), edited by Angelo Longo (2010)
- Paradoxides (2012)
- Angular Unconformity: Collected Poems 1970–2014 (2014)
- Lurch (2021)

=== Other ===
- Vis à Vis: Field Notes on Poetry & Wilderness (2002) (nominated for a Governor General's Award for Nonfiction)
- Deactivated West 100 (2005)
- The Muskwa Assemblage (2009)
- The Shell of the Tortoise: Four Essays and an Assemblage (2012)
- All New Animal Acts: Essays, Stretchers, Poems (2020)

== See also ==
- List of Canadian poets

== Sources ==
- Brian Bartlett, ed. Don McKay: Essays on His Works. Guernica Editions, Toronto (2006). ISBN 9781550712520.
