= Lorna Crozier =

Canadian poet and academic (born 1948)

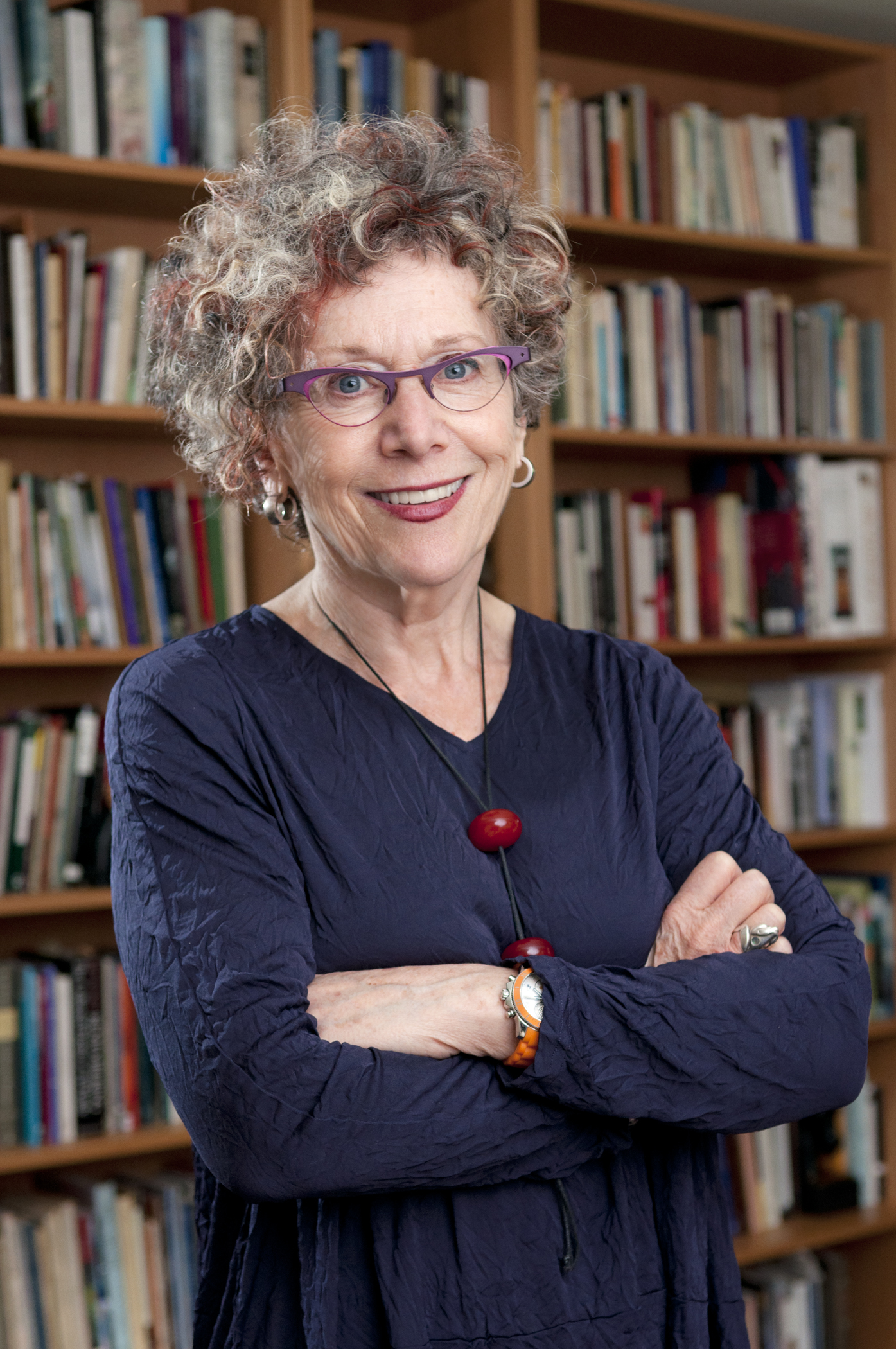
- Born: 24 May 1948 (age 78) Swift Current, Saskatchewan, Canada
- Occupation: Teacher, Poet
- Partner: Patrick Lane

Website
- www.lornacrozier.ca

Lorna Crozier, OC (born 24 May 1948) is a Canadian poet, author, and former chair of the Writing Department at the University of Victoria. She is the author of twenty-five books and was named an Officer of the Order of Canada in 2011 as one of Canada's pre-eminent poets and for her teaching. Crozier is credited as Lorna Uher on some of her earlier works.

== Life ==
Crozier was born in Swift Current, Saskatchewan, in 1948. Alcohol and poverty was a common backdrop in her childhood, which later became inspiration for her poetry.

Crozier attended the University of Saskatchewan where she received her B.A. in 1969, and the University of Alberta where she received her M.A. in 1980. Crozier then went on to become a high school English teacher and guidance counsellor. During these years, her first poem was published in Grain magazine.

In addition to her professorship at the University of Victoria, Crozier has taught creative writing at the Banff School of Fine Arts, the Saskatchewan Summer School of the Arts, and the Sechelt Summer Writing Festival. Crozier has served as the writer-in-residence at the Cypress Hills Community College in 1983, the Regina Public Library, and the University of Toronto in 1989.

Crozier has authored twenty-five books of work, which typically focus on human relationships, the natural world, language, memory, and perception. Alongside partner Patrick Lane, Crozier has co-authored No Longer Two People (1979), and co-edited Breathing Fire: Canada's New Poets (1995) and Breathing Fire 2 (2004).

A glowing book review from The Globe and Mail by Jacqueline Baker on Crozier's book, Small Beneath the Sky: A Prairie Memoir emphasized Crozier's prairie roots.

She has received a 1992 Governor General's Award, the Canadian Authors Association Award for Poetry, the National Magazine Award (Gold Medal), and first prize in the National CBC Literary Competition. Crozier received the University of Victoria's Distinguished Professors Award and the University of Regina presented her with an honorary Doctorate of Law in 2004. In 2015, she received honorary degrees from Simon Fraser University and McGill University.

Crozier has given various benefit readings for organizations such as the Society for the Prevention of Cruelty to Animals, Wintergreen Studios, The Land Conservancy of British Columbia, the Victoria READ Society, and PEERS, a group devoted to getting sex workers off the streets. She has read her poetry on every continent other than Antarctica, and on 19 May 2005 Crozier recited a poem for Queen Elizabeth II as part of Saskatchewan's Centennial Celebration.

In 2009, she was made a Fellow of the Royal Society of Canada and in 2011, Crozier became an Officer of the Order of Canada.

Her memoir Through the Garden: A Love Story (with Cats) was shortlisted for the 2020 Hilary Weston Writers' Trust Prize for Nonfiction.

Crozier is a supporter of literacy, animal rights, and the environment.

== Poetry ==
- Inside Is the Sky – 1976 (as Lorna Uher)
- Crow's Black Joy – 1979 (as Lorna Uher)
- Humans and Other Beasts – 1980 (as Lorna Uher)
- No Longer Two People: A Series of Poems (with Patrick Lane) – 1981
- The Weather – 1983
- The Garden Going on Without Us – 1985 (nominated for a Governor General's Award)
- Angels of Flesh, Angels of Silence – 1988 (nominated for a Governor General's Award)
- Inventing the Hawk – 1992 (winner of the Governor General's Award for Poetry and the Pat Lowther Award)
- Everything Arrives at the Light – 1995 (winner of the Pat Lowther Award)
- A Saving Grace: Collected Poems – 1996
- What the Living Won't Let Go – 1999
- Apocrypha of Light – 2002
- Bones in Their Wings: Ghazals – 2003
- Whetstone – 2005
- Before the First Word: The Poetry of Lorna Crozier (selected by Catherine Hunter) – 2005
- The Blue Hour of the Day: Selected Poems – 2007
- Small Mechanics – 2011 (nominated for the Pat Lowther Award)
- The Wrong Cat – 2015 (winner of the Pat Lowther Award)
- The Wild in You: Voices from the Forest and the Sea (with photographs by Ian McAllister) – 2015
- What the Soul Doesn't Want – 2017
- God of Shadows – 2018
- The House the Spirit Builds (with photographs by Peter Coffman and Diane Laundy) – 2019

== Anthologies ==
- A Sudden Radiance (with Gary Hyland) – 1987
- Breathing Fire (with Patrick Lane) – 1995
- Desire in Seven Voices – 2000
- Addicted: Notes from the Belly of the Beast (with Patrick Lane) – 2001
- Breathing Fire 2 (with Patrick Lane) – 2004
- The Best Canadian Poetry in English 2010 – 2010

== Non-fiction ==
- Small Beneath the Sky – 2009
- The Book of Marvels: A Compendium of Everyday Things – 2012 (nominated for the Pat Lowther Award)
- Through the Garden: A Love Story (with Cats) – 2020
