= New Brunswick Book Awards =

Canadian literary award

The New Brunswick Book Awards, established in 2016, are annual Canadian literary awards presented by the Writers Federation of New Brunswick (WFNB) and The Fiddlehead to honour literary works created by authors and illustrators of New Brunswick. Awards are presented in five categories: the Alice Kitts Memorial Award for picture books, the Books for Youth and Young Adult Award for middle grade and young adult books, Mrs. Dunster's Fiction Prize for adult novels, the WFNB Nonfiction Award for nonfiction, and the Fiddlehead Poetry Book Prize for poetry. Winners receive a CA$500 cash prize.

To be eligible for the awards, authors must be New Brunswick residents, defined as living in New Brunswick for three of the previous five years, with at least 50 percent residency per year. For books with more than one contributor, only one author needs to meet this requirement. Further, books must have been written or illustrated by a person (not a large language model) and published in print for the first time within the past year.

== Awards ==
=== Alice Kitts Memorial Award ===
The Alice Kitts Memorial Award for Excellence in Picture Book Writing, established in 2017, is presented annually for picture books written by authors from New Brunswick. The award honours New Brunswick author and artist Alice Kitts. The award sponsored by Kitts' children.

For a picture book to be eligible for the award, it must be written by an author who resides in New Brunswick; the illustrator does not need to reside in New Brunswick. Additionally, the book must be geared toward readers ages three to six, be between 24 to 48 pages in length, and have a maximum of 1000 words. Both fiction and nonfiction books are eligible.

Award winners and shortlists
Year	Author	Title	Result	Ref.
2017	Jennifer McGrath, illustrated by Josée Bisaillon	The Snow Knows	Winner	
2017	Diane Carmel Leger, illustrated by Jean-Luc Trudell	My Two Grandmothers	Shortlist	
2017	Heidi Jardine Stoddart	Sea Glass Summer	Shortlist	
2018	Odette Barr, Colleen Landry, and Beth Weatherbee	Take off to Tantramar	Winner	
2018	Paul McAllister, illustrated by Emily Brown	New Song for Herman	Shortlist	
2018	Whitney Alice	Henrietta's Nightlight	Shortlist	
2019	Kelly Cooper, illustrated by Lucy Elridge	If a Horse Had Words	Winner	
2019	Braelyn Cyr	Mahtoqehs Journey	Shortlist	
2019	Joann Hamilton-Barry	There Be Pirates!	Shortlist	
2020-21	Marla LeSage	We Wear Masks	Winner	
2020-21	Kim Renton, illustrated by Tamara Thibaux-Heikalo	Watcha Doin'?	Shortlist	
2020-21	Shyla Augustine	Mi'kmaq Alphabet Book	Shortlist	
2022	Riel Nason, illustrated by Nathasha Pilotte	Disaster at the Highland Games	Winner	
2022	Jodie Callaghan, translated by Joe Wilmot, and illustrated by Georgia Lesley	Ga's The Train	Shortlist	
2022	Leo LaFleur, illustrated by Adam Oehlers	The Errand: The Queen	Shortlist	
2023	Kelly Cooper, illustrated by Daniel Miyares	Midnight & Moon	Winner	
2023	Jennifer McGrath, illustrated by Kathryn Durst	Pugs Cause Traffic Jams	Shortlist	
2023	Masen Grasse	Trucks	Shortlist	
2024	Sara O'Leary, illustrated by Briony May Smith	The Little Books of the Little Brontës	Winner	
2024	Braelyn Cyr	Apli'kmuj's Journey	Shortlist	
2024	Gail Francis, illustrated by Tara Audibert	Moonbeam	Shortlist	
2025-26	Jennifer McGrath, illustrated by Kristina Jones	The Pony and The Starling	Winner	
2025-26	Kimothy Stewart, illustrated by Airen MacMaster	Morgan Moose	Shortlist	
2025-26	Riel Nason, illustrated by Byron Eggenschwiler	The Little Ghost Quilt's Winter Surprise	Shortlist	

=== Books for Youth and Young Adult Award ===
Originally titled the Books for Young Readers Award, the Books for Youth and Young Adult Award was first presented in 2025 to honour middle grade and young adult novels and nonfiction books. Eligible books must be traditionally or self-published within the previous calendar year. The award is sponsored by J.D. Irving.

Award winners and shortlists
Year	Author	Title	Result	Ref.
2025	Valerie Sherrard	An Unbalanced Force	Winner	
2025	Bea Waters	Project Human	Shortlist	
2025	Odette Barr, Colleen Landry, and Beth Weatherbee; illustrated by Odette Barr	Follow the Goose Butt to Prince Edward Island	Shortlist	
2026	Evan Jones	What to Do When You Don't Know What to Do	Winner	
2026	Thomas Chamberlain	Happenstance	Shortlist	
2026	Erik Gingles	The Nomies & The Surface Protocol	Shortlist	

=== Mrs. Dunster's Fiction Prize ===
The Mrs. Dunster's Fiction Prize, first awarded in 2016, is presented annually for fictional books published by a New Brunswick resident. Eligible works can include novels and short story collections written by a single author. The award is sponsored by Mrs. Dunster's.

Award winners and shortlists
Year	Author	Title	Result	Ref.
2016	Beth Powning	A Measure of Light	Winner	
2016	R. W. Gray	Entropic	Shortlist	
2016	Mark Anthony Jarman	Knife Party at the Hotel Europa	Shortlist	
2017	Kerry Lee Powell	Willem de Kooning's Paintbrush	Winner	
2017	Roger Moore	Bistro	Shortlist	
2017	Riel Nason	All the Things We Leave Behind	Shortlist	
2018	Peter J. Clair	Taapoategl & Pallet	Winner	
2018	Wayne Curtis	Home Coming	Shortlist	
2018	M. T. Dohaney	Caplin Scull	Shortlist	
2019	Raymond Fraser	Through Sunlight and Shadows	Winner	
2019	Meghan Rose Allen	Enid Strange	Shortlist	
2019	Susan White	Headliner	Shortlist	
2020	Sarah Xarar Murphy	Itzel I: A Tlatelolco Awakening	Winner	
2020	Chris Eaton	Symphony No. 3	Shortlist	
2020	Susan White	Fear of Drowning	Shortlist	
2021	Riel Nason	Waiting Under Water	Winner	
2021	Mark Anthony Jarman	Czech Techno	Shortlist	
2021	Kathleen Peacock	You Were Never Here	Shortlist	
2022	Beth Powning	The Sister's Tale	Winner	
2022	Amber McMillan	The Running Trees	Shortlist	
2022	Valerie Sherrard	Birdspell	Shortlist	
2023	Lee D. Thompson	Apastoral: A Mistopia	Winner	
2023	Meghan Rose Allen	The Summer the School Burned Down	Shortlist	
2023	Valerie Sherrard	A Bend in the Breeze	Shortlist	
2024	Lisa Alward	Cocktail	Winner	
2024	Luke Francis Beirne	Blacklion	Shortlist	
2024	Valerie Sherrard	Standing on Neptune	Shortlist	
2025	Nelson Keane	Nachzehrer	Winner	
2025	Mark Blagrave	Felt	Shortlist	
2025	Vanessa C. Hawkins	A Child to Cry Over	Shortlist	
2026	Bob Stutt	Puppet	Winner	
2026	Pierre C. Arseneault	Something Happened in Carlton	Shortlist	
2026	Michael Simon	Extinction	Shortlist	

=== WFNB Nonfiction Award ===
The WFNB Nonfiction Book Prize, first awarded in 2016, is presented annually for nonfiction books published by a New Brunswick resident. The award is sponsored by the family of Ann Brennan, a founding member of the WFNB.

Award winners and shortlists
Year	Author	Title	Result	Ref.
2016	Donald Savoie	What is Government Good At?	Winner	
2016	Nicholas Guitard	The Lost Wilderness	Shortlist	
2016	David Sullivan	Boss Gibson: Lumber King of New Brunswick	Shortlist	
2017	Bobbi-Jean MacKinnon	Shadow of Doubt	Winner	
2017	Melynda Jarratt	Letters from Beauly: Pat Hennessy and the Canadian Forestry Corps in Scotland, 1940-1945	Shortlist	
2017	Roslyn Rosenfeld	Lucy Jarvis: Even Stones Have Life	Shortlist	
2018	Rachel Bryant	The Homing Place	Winner	
2018	Tony Robinson-Smith	The Dragon Run	Shortlist	
2018	Jan Wong	Apron Strings	Shortlist	
2019	Jacques Poitras	Pipe Dreams	Winner	
2020	Danny Jacobs	Sourcebooks for Our Drawings: Essays and Remnants	Winner	
2020	Leslie Kern	Feminist City: A Field Guide	Shortlist	
2020	Ronald Rees and Joshua Green	Slow Seconds: The Photography of George Thomas Taylor	Shortlist	
2021	Philip Lee	Restigouche: The Long Run of the Wild River	Winner	
2021	Odette Barr	Teaching at the Top of the World	Shortlist	
2021	Virginia Bliss Bjerkelund	Meadowlands: A Chronicle of the Scovil Family	Shortlist	
2022	Martha Vowles	Senior Management, Parenting my Parents	Winner	
2022	Janet Coulter Sanford	Memories on the Bounty: A Story of Friendship, Love, and Adventure	Shortlist	
2022	Michael Boudreau and Bonnie Huskins	Just the Usual Work: The Social Worlds of Ida Martin, Working-Class Diarist	Shortlist	
2023	James Mullinger	Brit Happens* Or Living the Canadian Dream	Winner	
2023	Mark Anthony Jarman	Touch Anywhere to Begin	Shortlist	
2023	Jon Claytor	Take the Long Way Home	Shortlist	
2024	Anne Koval	Mary Pratt: A Love Affair with Vision	Winner	
2024	Valerie Sherrard and Natalie Hyde, illustrated by David Jardine	More than Words: Navigating the Complex World of Communication	Shortlist	
2024	Jason Bell	Cracking the Nazi Code: The Untold Story of Canada's Greatest Spy	Shortlist	
2025	C. Ted Behne, James W. Wheaton, Keith Helmuth, Daryl Hunter, and Nicholas N. Smith	Tappan Adney: From Birchbark Canoes to Indigenous Rights	Winner	
2025	Margaret Augustine and Lauren Beck	Mitji – Let's Eat! Mi'kmaq Recipes from Sikniktuk	Shortlist	
2025	Donald J. Savoie	Speaking Truth to Canadians About Their Public Service	Shortlist	
2026	Karissa Donkin	Breakaway – The PWHL and the Women who changed the Game	Winner	
2026	Ian LeTourneau (ed.)	A Great Cloud of Witnessing – the Arts Journalism of Nancy Bauer	Shortlist	
2026	D. Bruce Hughes	Stroke of Luck: Music, Medicine and a Miraculous Recovery	Shortlist	

=== Fiddlehead Poetry Book Prize ===
The Fiddlehead Poetry Book Prize, first awarded in YEAR, is presented annually for books of poetry published by a New Brunswick resident. The award is sponsored by The Fiddlehead.

Award winners and shortlists
Year	Author	Title	Result	Ref.
2016	M. Travis Lane	Crossover	Winner	
2016	Phillip Crymble	Not Even Laughter	Shortlist	
2016	Michael Pacey	Electric Affinities	Shortlist	
2017	M. Travis Lane	The Witch of the Inner Wood	Winner	
2017	Wayne Clifford	The Exile's Papers	Shortlist	
2017	Robert Moore	Based on Actual Events	Shortlist	
2018	Allan Cooper	Everything We Love Comes Back to Find Us	Winner	
2018	Wayne Clifford	Flying the Truck	Shortlist	
2018	Kathy Mac	Human Misunderstanding	Shortlist	
2019	Jenna Lyn Albert	Bec & Call	Winner	
2019	Herménégilde Chiasson, translated by Jo-Anne Elder	To Live and Die in Scoudouc	Shortlist	
2019	Kayla Geitzler	That Light Feeling Under Your Feet	Shortlist	
2020	Jennifer Houle	Virga	Winner	
2020	Lucas Crawford	Belated Bris of the Brainsick	Shortlist	
2020	Matthew Gwathmey	Our Latest in Folktales	Shortlist	
2021	Allan Cooper	Waiting for the Small Ship of Desire	Winner	
2021	M. Travis Lane	Keeping Count	Shortlist	
2021	Emily Skov-Neilsen	The Knowing Animals	Shortlist	
2022	Triny Finlay	Myself a Paper Clip	Winner	
2022	Rebecca Salazar	sulphurtongue	Shortlist	
2022	Jane Tims	a glimpse of water fall	Shortlist	
2023	Sue Sinclair	Almost Beauty	Winner	
2023	Amber McMillan	This is a Stick-Up	Shortlist	
2023	Michael Pacey	Wild Apples: A Dialogue with Thoreau	Shortlist	
2024	Fawn Parker	Soft Inheritance	Winner	
2024	Matthew Gwathmey	Tumbling for Amateurs	Shortlist	
2024	Allan Cooper	The Face of Everything	Shortlist	
2025	Michael Pacey	Van Gogh's Grasshopper	Winner	
2025	Matthew Gwathmey	Family Band	Shortlist	
2025	Gerald Arthur Moore	Flak Jacket	Shortlist	
2026	Ian LeTourneau	metadata from a changing climate	Winner	
