= J. M. Abraham Poetry Award =

Canadian literary award

J.M. Abraham Poetry Award
- Description: Best work of poetry by an Atlantic Canadian writer
- Country: Canada
- Presented by: Atlantic Book Awards & Festival
- Rewards: $2,000 (winner) $250 (finalists)
- Website: atlanticbookawards.ca

The J.M. Abraham Poetry Award, formerly known as the Atlantic Poetry Prize, is a Canadian literary award, presented annually by the Atlantic Book Awards & Festival, to the best work of poetry published by a writer from the Atlantic provinces. The winner receives $2,000 and finalists receive $250 each.

The award was established in 1998 as the Atlantic Poetry Prize and was renamed in 2014 to honor Father Joseph Murray Abraham.

== Winners and nominees ==
=== 1990s ===
Year	Poet	Title	Ref.
1998	Carmelita McGrath	To the New World	
1998	Carole Glasser Langille	In Cannon Cave	
1999	John Steffler	That Night We Were Ravenous	
1999	Don Domanski	Parish of the Physic Moon	
1999	Robin McGrath	Escaped Domestics	

=== 2000s ===
Year	Poet	Title	Ref.
2000	Ken Babstock	Mean	
2000	Herménégilde Chiasson (tr. Jo-Anne Elder, Fred Cogswell)	Climates	
2000	George Elliott Clarke	Beatrice Chancy	
2001	Anne Simpson	Light Falls Through You	
2001	Douglas Burnet Smith	The Killed	
2001	John MacKenzie	Sledgehammer and Other Poems	
2002	M. Travis Lane	Keeping Afloat	
2002	Herménégilde Chiasson	Conversations	
2002	Patrick Warner	All Manner of Misunderstanding	
2003	Anne Compton	Opening the Island	
2003	Brian Bartlett	The Afterlife of Trees	
2003	Robert Moore	So Rarely in Our Skins	
2004	Brian Bartlett	Wanting the Day	
2004	Jill MacLean	The Brevity of Red	
2004	Sue Sinclair	Mortal Arguments	
2005	David Helwig	The Year One	
2005	Susan Goyette	Undone	
2005	John Smith	Fireflies in the Magnolia Grove	
2006	Anne Compton	Processional	
2006	Robin McGrath	Covenant of Salt	
2006	Harry Thurston	A Ship Portrait	
2007	Steve McOrmond	Primer on the Hereafter	
2007	Mary Dalton	Red Ledger	
2007	Peter Sanger	Aiken Drum	
2008	Don Domanski	All Our Wonder Unavenged	
2008	George Murray	The Rush to Here	
2008	Anne Simpson	Quick	
2009	Brent MacLaine	Shades of Green	
2009	Sue Sinclair	Sector	
2009	Alan R. Wilson	Sky Atlas	

=== 2010s ===
Year	Poet	Title	Ref.
2010	Tonja Gunvaldsen Klaassen	Lean-To	
2010	Anne Compton	Asking Questions Indoors and Out	
2010	Zachariah Wells	Track & Trace	
2011	John Steffler	Lookout	
2011	Douglas Burnet Smith	Learning to Count	
2011	Johanna Skibsrud	I Do Not Think That I Could Love a Human Being	
2012	Susan Goyette	outskirts	
2012	Warren Heiti	Hydrologos	
2012	Anne Simpson	Is	
2013	Lesley Choyce	I'm Alive. I Believe in Everything	
2013	Carole Glasser Langille	Church of the Exquisite Panic: The Ophelia Poems	
2013	George Murray	Whiteout	
2014	Don Domanski	Bite Down Little Whisper	
2014	Mary Dalton	Hooking	
2014	Susan Goyette	Ocean	
2015	Susan Paddon	Two Tragedies in 429 Breaths	
2015	Brian Bartlett	Ringing Here & There: A Nature Calendar	
2015	Sylvia Hamilton	And I Alone Escaped to Tell You	
2016	Susan Goyette	The Brief Reinacarnation of a Girl	
2016	Phillip Crymble	Not Even Laughter	
2016	John Wall Barger	The Book of Festus	
2017	Jennifer Houle	The Back Channels	
2017	Margo Wheaton	The Unlit Path Behind the House	
2017	Patrick Woodcock	You Can't Bury Them All	
2018	Julia McCarthy	All the Names Between	
2018	Allan Cooper	Everything We've Loved Comes Back to Find Us	
2018	Alison Dyer	I'd Write the Sea Like a Parlour Game	
2019	Allison Smith	This Kind of Thinking Does No Good	
2019	Basma Kavanagh	Ruba’iyat for the Time of Apricots	
2019	Annick MacAskill	No Meeting Without Body	

=== 2020s ===
Year	Poet	Title	Ref.
2020	Lucas Crawford	Belated Bris of the Brainsick	
2020	Tammy Armstrong	Year of the Metal Rabbit	
2020	Anne Compton	Smallholding	
2021	Afua Cooper	Black Matters	
2021	David Huebert	Humanimus	
2021	shalan joudry	Waking Ground	
2022	Alyda Faber	Poisonous If Eaten Raw	
2022	Triny Finlay	Myself a Paperclip	
2022	Rebecca Salazar	Sulphurtongue	
2023	Nanci Lee	Hsin	
2023	Luke Hathaway	The Affirmations	
2023	Annick MacAskill	Shadow Blight	
2024	Fawn Parker	Soft Inheritance	
2024	Joe Bishop	Indie Rock	
2024	Matthew Hollett	Optic Nerve	
2024	Sadie McCarney	Your Therapist Says It's Magical Thinking	
2024	Harry Thurston	Ultramarine	
2025	Douglas Walbourne-Gough	Island	
2025	Clare Goulet	Graphis scripta / writing lichen	
2025	Annick MacAskill	Votive	
2025	Johanna Skibsrud	Medium	
2025	Bren Simmers	The Work	

== See also ==
- List of poetry awards
