= Elizabeth Brewster =

Canadian poet

- Born: Elizabeth Winifred Brewster; August 26, 1922; Chipman, New Brunswick
- Died: December 26, 2012 (aged 90); Saskatoon, Saskatchewan
- Education: University of New Brunswick; Radcliffe College; University of Toronto; Indiana University Bloomington
- Writing career
- Language: English
- Genre: Poetry
- Notable awards: Order of Canada Saskatchewan Order of Merit Queen's Diamond Jubilee Medal

Elizabeth Winifred Brewster, CM SOM (26 August 1922 – 26 December 2012) was a Canadian poet, author, and academic.

== Biography ==
Born in the logging village of Chipman, New Brunswick, Brewster was the youngest of Frederick John and Ethel May (Day) Brewster's five children. The family was of limited means, and although she was a physically frail child with a sporadic early education, Brewster was a keen reader of any material that presented itself, including literary classics and the Eatons catalogue. Her first poem, submitted by her father and accepted by the Saint John Telegraph-Journal, was published when she was twelve years old. After she graduated from high school in 1942, Brewster entered the University of New Brunswick on an entrance scholarship. She received a Bachelor of Arts degree in 1946, a Master of Arts from Harvard's Radcliffe College in Cambridge, Massachusetts in 1947, then began her PhD at Indiana University, before electing to travel to England on a Beaverbrook overseas scholarship to study at King's College, London from 1949 to 1950. She later earned a Bachelor of Library Science from the University of Toronto, then returned in 1957 to Indiana University Bloomington to complete her PhD on the work of English poet George Crabbe and graduated in 1962. She was a professor at the University of Saskatchewan, where she taught literature and creative writing from 1972 until she retired in 1990.

A founding member in 1945 of the Canadian literary journal The Fiddlehead, Brewster went on to publish over twenty collections of her poetry, five books of fiction, and two memoirs. Over the course of her long career, she was a recipient of the E.J. Pratt Award for poems from her second book Lillooet, the Saskatchewan Lifetime Achievement Award in 1995, an honorary doctorate from the University of New Brunswick, the 2003 Saskatchewan Book Award for Poetry, a Saskatchewan Order of Merit in 2008, and the Queen's Diamond Jubilee Medal, and several other honours. Her poetry collection Footnotes to the Book of Job was shortlisted for the 1996 Governor General's Award, and in 2001, she was inducted as a Member into the Order of Canada, Canada's highest civilian honour.

== Selected bibliography ==
=== Poetry ===
- East Coast. Toronto: Ryerson Press, 1951.
- Lillooet (with art by JEH MacDonald and Thoreau MacDonald). Toronto: Ryerson Press, 1954.
- Roads, and Other Poems. Toronto: Ryerson Press, 1957.
- Passage of Summer: Selected Poems. Toronto: Ryerson Press, 1969.
- Sunrise North. Toronto: Clarke, Irwin & Company, 1972.
- In Search of Eros. Toronto: Clarke, Irwin, 1974.
- Sometimes I Think of Moving. Ottawa: Oberon Press, 1977.
- The Way Home. Ottawa: Oberon Press, 1982.
- Digging In. Ottawa: Oberon Press, 1982.
- Selected Poems, 1944-1977 & 1977-1984 (2 volumes). Ottawa: Oberon Press, 1985.
- Entertaining Angels. Ottawa: Oberon Press, 1988.
- Spring Again. Ottawa: Oberon Press, 1990. Finalist for the 1991 Pat Lowther Award.
- Wheel of Change. Ottawa: Oberon Press, 1993.
- Footnotes to the Book of Job. Ottawa: Oberon Press, 1995. Finalist for the 1996 Governor General's Award.
- Garden of Sculpture. Ottawa: Oberon Press, 1998.
- Burning Bush. Ottawa: Oberon Press, 2000.
- Jacob's Dream. Ottawa: Oberon Press, 2002. Winner of the 2003 Saskatchewan Book Award.
- Collected Poems of Elizabeth Brewster 1. Ottawa: Oberon Press, 2003.
- Collected Poems of Elizabeth Brewster 2. Ottawa: Oberon Press, 2004.
- Bright Centre. Ottawa: Oberon Press, 2005.
- Time and Seasons. Ottawa: Oberon Press, 2009.
- The Essential Elizabeth Brewster - poems, ed. Ingrid Ruthig. Erin: The Porcupine's Quill, 2021

=== Prose ===
- The Sisters. (novel) Ottawa: Oberon Press, 1974.
- It's Easy to Fall on the Ice. (stories) Ottawa: Oberon Press, 1977.
- Junction. (novel) Windsor: Black Moss Press, 1982.
- A House Full of Women. (stories) Ottawa: Oberon Press, 1983.
- Visitations. (stories) Ottawa: Oberon Press, 1987.
- The Invention of Truth. (memoir) Ottawa: Oberon Press, 1991.
- Away from Home. (memoir) Ottawa: Oberon Press, 1995.

=== Anthologies ===
- The Oxford Book of Canadian Verse, ed. A.J.M. Smith. Toronto: Oxford University Press, 1960.
- Five New Brunswick Poets: Elizabeth Brewster, Fred Cogswell, Robert Gibbs, Alden Nowlan, Kay Smith, ed. Fred Cogswell. Fredericton: University of New Brunswick, 1962.
- The Penguin Book of Canadian Verse, second revised edition, ed. Ralph Gustafson. Penguin Books, 1958, 1967, 1975.
- Selections from Major Canadian Writers, ed. Desmond Pacey. Toronto: McGraw-Hill Ryerson, 1974.
- Celebrating Canadian Women: Prose and Poetry By and About Women, ed. Greta Hofmann Nemiroff. Markham: Fitzhenry & Whiteside, 1984.
- Choice Atlantic : Writers of Newfoundland and the Maritimes, ed. Elaine Crocker, Eric Norman, and Michael Nowlan. St. John's: Breakwater, 1990.
- A Matter of Spirit: Recovery of the Sacred in Contemporary Canadian Poetry, ed. Susan McCaslin. Victoria: Ekstasis Editions, 1998.
- Coastlines: The Poetry of Atlantic Canada, ed. Anne Compton, Laurence Hutchman, Ross Leckie, and Robin McGrath. Fredericton: Goose Lane Editions, 2002.
- Canadian Poetry 1920 to 1960, ed. Brian Trehearne. Toronto: McClelland & Stewart, 2010.

=== Musical settings of poems by Elizabeth Brewster ===
- Winter flowers: for alto soloist, chorus & orchestra. Music by Nancy Telfer, c.1980, words by Elizabeth Brewster.
- The Ballad of Princess Caraboo: a narrative of singular imposition for mezzo-soprano and piano. Music by Nancy Telfer, words by Elizabeth Brewster. F. Harris Music, c.1983.

== Archives ==
There is an Elizabeth Brewster fond at Library and Archives Canada. The archival reference is R931, former archival reference number MG30-D370. The fond covers the date range 1935 (approximately) to 1997. It consists of 4.91 meters of textual records along with a number of graphic material and objects.
