= Clara Kathleen Smith =

Canadian poet

Clara Kathleen (Kay) Smith
- Born: Clara Kathleen Smith; April 30, 1911; Saint John, New Brunswick
- Died: September 18, 2004 (aged 93); Hampton, New Brunswick
- Education: Mount Allison Ladies' College
- Writing career
- Language: English
- Genre: Poetry

Clara Kathleen "Kay" Smith (April 30, 1911 – September 18, 2004) was a Canadian poet in New Brunswick.

== Biography ==
The daughter of Charles Weber Smith and Margaret Mirey, she was born in Saint John, New Brunswick and was educated there and at Mount Allison Ladies' College. She grew up as an only child, her only brother having died shortly before her birth. Smith published her first poem at the age of 14. After completing her education, she taught school in Saint John until 1940. From 1940 to 1942, she taught at Alma College in St. Thomas, Ontario. Smith then returned to Saint John and taught at Saint John Vocational School for almost 30 years.

Her work appeared in various literary magazines, such as Contemporary Verse, Canadian Poetry Magazine and The Fiddlehead. In 1952, she published her first book of poetry, Footnote to the Lord's Prayer and Other Poems.

She was named a life member of the League of Canadian Poets in 1986 and received an Honorary Doctor of Letters from the University of New Brunswick two years later. In 1991, she received the Alden Nowlan Award for Excellence in English-Language Literary Arts. In 1992, the literary journal The Cormorant dedicated an issue to her life and work.

Smith died in hospital in Hampton, New Brunswick after an extended illness.

A portrait of Smith by artist Miller Brittain is part of the collection of the New Brunswick Museum.

== Bibliography ==
- Footnote to The Lord's Prayer and Other Poems. First Statement press, 1951.
- Five New Brunswick Poets: Elizabeth Brewster, Fred Cogswell, Robert Gibbs, Alden Nowlan, Kay Smith, ed. Fred Cogswell. Fredericton: University of New Brunswick, 1962.
- At the Bottom of the Dark. Fredericton: Fiddlehead Poetry Books, 1971.
- When a Girl Looks Down. Fredericton: Fiddlehead Poetry Books, 1978.
- The Bright Particulars: New and Selected Poems. Charlottetown: Ragweed Press, 1987.
- The Essential Kay Smith, ed. Michael Oliver. Erin: The Porcupine's Quill, 2019.
