= Brian Bartlett =

Canadian writer

Brian Bartlett (born October 1, 1953) is a Canadian poet, essayist, nature writer, and editor. He has published 16 books or chapbooks of poetry, three prose books of nature writing, and a compilation of prose about poetry. He was born in St. Stephen, New Brunswick, and lived in Fredericton from 1957 to 1975. While a high-school student and an undergraduate he attended the informal writers workshop the Ice House (a.k.a. McCord Hall or Tuesday Night); there and elsewhere he benefited from the generosity and friendship of writers such as Nancy and William Bauer, Robert Gibbs, Alden Nowlan, A.G. Bailey, Kent Thompson, Fred Cogswell, David Adams Richards, and Michael Pacey. After completing his B.A. at the University of New Brunswick, including an Honours thesis entitled "Dialogue as Form and Device in the Poetry of W.B. Yeats," Bartlett moved to Montreal Quebec, and stayed there for 15 years. He completed an M.A. from Concordia University, with a short-story-collection thesis (advisor: Clark Blaise), and a PhD at Université de Montréal (dissertation: "Speech and Address in the Poetry of A.R. Ammons"). In 1990 he relocated to Halifax, Nova Scotia to teach Creative Writing and English at Saint Mary's University.

During his final dozen years of teaching, Bartlett edited several other poets' works, including a compilation of essays about Don McKay and Collected Poems of Alden Nowlan. After nearly three decades at Saint Mary's, Bartlett retired from teaching in 2018. He had guided workshops in several genres (poetry, fiction, non-fiction prose), as well as courses in many fields of literature. He also oversaw the Saint Mary's Reading Series. A long-time admirer of Thoreau, Bartlett has given presentations at Thoreau conferences in Concord, Massachusetts; Gothenburg, Sweden; and Reykholt, Iceland. Bartlett's continues to writes poetry and prose. His wife, Karen Dahl (b. 1963), was a Senior Manager for the Halifax Regional Library system; their children are Josh (b. 1997) and Laura (b. 2000).

== Publications ==
=== Poetry ===
- Finches for the Wake. Fredericton, NB: Fiddlehead, 1971.
- Brother's Insomnia. Fredericton, NB: The New Brunswick Chapbooks, 1972.
- Cattail Week. Montreal: Villeneuve, 1981.
- Planet Harbor. Fredericton: Goose Lane Editions, 1989.
- Underwater Carpentry. Fredericton: Goose Lane Editions, 1993
- Granite Erratics. Victoria: Ekstasis, 1997.
- The Afterlife of Trees. Montreal, Quebec: McGill-Queen's UP, 2002.
- Wanting the Day: Selected Poems. Fredericton: Goose Lane Editions, 2003; Calstock, Cornwall, UK: Peterloo Poets, 2004.
- Travels of the Watch. Kentville: Gaspereau, 2004.
- The Watchmaker's Table. Fredericton: Goose Lane Editions, 2008.
- Being Charlie. Vancouver, BC: Alfred Gustav, 2009.
- Potato Blossom Road: Seven Montages. Victoria: Ekstasis, 2013.
- Keatonesque. Kingston, ON: Thee Hellbox Press, 2017.
- Safety Last. Kentville: Gaspereau, 2019.
- The Astonishing Room. Okotoks, Alberta: Frontenac House, 2024.

=== Prose ===
- "Introduction." Charles G. D. Roberts, Red Fox. 1905. Halifax, NS: Formac, 2008.
- "'A Many-veined Leaf': Minutiae and Multiplicity in Brian Bartlett's Poetry." Interview. Anne Compton, Meetings with Maritime Poets: Interviews (Markham: Fitzhenry & Whiteside, 2006).
- Ringing Here & There: A Nature Calendar. Markham, ON: Fitzhenry & Whiteside, 2014.
- All Manner of Tackle: Living with Poetry. Windsor, ON: Palimpsest Press, 2017.
- Branches Over Ripples: A Waterside Journal. Kentville, NS: Gaspereau Press, 2017.
- Daystart Songflight: A Morning Journal. East Lawrencetown, NS: Pottersfield Press, 2021.

=== Edited ===
- Don McKay: Essays on His Works. Brian Bartlett ed. Toronto: Guernica, 2006.
- Earthly Pages: The Poetry of Don Domanski. Brian Bartlett ed. Waterloo, ON: Wilfrid Laurier UP, 2007.
- The Essential James Reaney. Brian Bartlett ed. Erin: Porcupine's Quill, 2009.
- The Essential Robert Gibbs. Brian Bartlett ed. Erin: Porcupine's Quill, 2012.
- The Child Alone. Brian Bartlett ed. With art work by Laura Bartlett. Victoria, BC: Frog Hollow Press, 2015.
- Collected Poems of Alden Nowlan. Brian Bartlett ed. Fredericton, NB: Icehouse Poetry, 2017.
- The Essential Dorothy Roberts. Brian Bartlett ed. Erin, ON: Porcupine's Quill, 2018.
- Bright with Invisible History: A William Bauer Reader. Brian Bartlett ed. Woodstock, NB: Chapel Street Editions, 2020.
- In Loving Riddles: Selected Poems of Joseph Sherman. Charlottetown: Acorn Press, 2024.

== Awards ==
- Winner of The Malahat Review Long Poem Prize 1992, for "Underwater Carpentry."
- Winner of The Malahat Review Long Poem Prize 1999, for "Hawthornden Improvisations."
- Winner of Petra Kenney International Poetry Prize 2001, for "Foot-doctor for the Homeless."
- Shortlisted for Atlantic Poetry Prize 2003, for The Afterlife of Trees.
- Winner of Atlantic Poetry Prize 2004, for Wanting the Day: Selected Poems.
- Winner of Acorn-Plantos Award for Poetry's Poetry 2008, for The Watchmaker's Table.
- Shortlisted for J. M. Abraham Prize for Poetry 2015, for Ringing Here & There: A Nature Calendar.
