= Intercourse (magazine) =

Intercourse, subtitled Contemporary Canadian Writing, was a literary magazine published in Montreal, Canada, from 1966 to 1971. In total, 14 issues appeared. The magazine was established and edited by Raymond Fraser and LeRoy Johnson and had a number of guest editors, including Alden Nowlan, Al Pittman, Louis Cormier, and Bernell MacDonald. Among the contributors were such Canadian literary figures as Irving Layton, Al Purdy, Elizabeth Brewster, Leonard Cohen, Hugh Hood, Marty Gervais, John Glassco, Patrick Lane, Robert Hawkes, Silver Donald Cameron, Fred Cogswell, George Bowering, and Seymour Mayne.

The final issue of Intercourse (No. 14) was guest-edited by Louis Cormier and was heavily Buddhist-oriented.
