= Wayne Clifford =

Canadian poet (1944–2025)

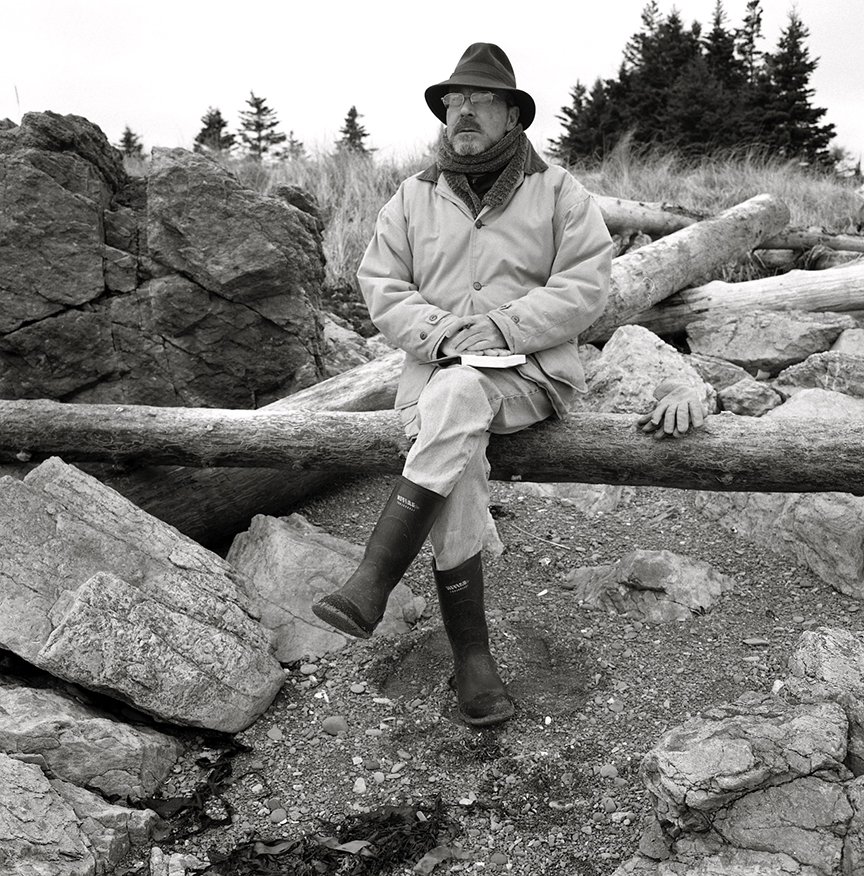
- Born: 10 May 1944; Toronto, Ontario, Canada
- Died: 15 April 2025 (aged 80); Grand Manan, New Brunswick, Canada
- Education: University of Toronto (BA); University of Iowa (MFA)
- Occupations: Poet, professor

Wayne Wallace Jordan Clifford (10 May 1944 – 15 April 2025) was a Canadian poet, editor and educator.

== Early life and education ==
Clifford was born on 10 May 1944 in Toronto, Ontario. He started writing poetry at the age of twelve. The first publication of his work was in The Fiddlehead in 1962. He attended University College at the University of Toronto and earned a Bachelor of Arts degree in English in 1967. In 1967, he and Michael Ondaatje were the co-winners of the E. J. Pratt Award in Poetry, an annual competition open to students "proceeding toward a first or a post-graduate degree at the University of Toronto".

While an undergraduate Clifford worked as acquisitions editor and typesetter at the newly established Coach House Press. His first poetry collection, Man in a Window (1965), was the first book published by Coach House Press. He attended the founding meeting of the League of Canadian Poets in 1966. In 1969, he earned Master of Arts and Master of Fine Arts degrees from the International Writing Program at the University of Iowa. While at the University of Iowa he held a graduate teaching fellowship with the printer and Cummington Press publisher Harry Duncan.

== Career ==
Clifford taught at St. Lawrence College in Kingston, Ontario from 1969 until 2004, first in the Creative Writing and Fine Arts programs and later in the General Arts and Science program.

Clifford was active in the Kingston artistic community, organizing and participating in poetry readings and publishing several volumes of poetry in the 1970s. Reviews of his 1976 collection Glass/Passages described him as a "poet with a committed, intelligent voice" writing "pure poetry wrought from his experiences", and the book as a "rich, complex and linguistically challenging collection".

Clifford left teaching in 2004 to write full-time, and moved to the island of Grand Manan in 2007. On Abducting the Cello, a collection of 53 sonnets, was published in 2004 by The Porcupine's Quill, whose poetry editor Eric Ormsby described Clifford as "a master" of the sonnet who "respects that form but [is] constantly subverting it". Porcupine's Quill published several more volumes by Clifford, including a four-volume sonnet series entitled The Exile's Papers. A reviewer noted Clifford's debt to the metaphysical poets and to William Empson, whose "linguistic density" and "undercurrent of warmth" he shared. The fourth and final volume of The Exile's Papers was a finalist for the 2016 Fiddlehead Poetry Book Prize.

In 2014, Book*hug Press published Theseus: A Collaboration, by Clifford and bpNichol. The two poets had begun working on the book together in 1966 and it was unfinished when Nichol died in 1988. Clifford completed the book, adding a third section based on Nichol's Martyrology.

In 2013 and 2014, Clifford was an artist in residence at summer Bioblitzes carried out by the New Brunswick Museum in the Grand Lake Protected Natural Area in New Brunswick. His 2017 book Flying the Truck was inspired by these experiences. It was a finalist for the 2017 Fiddlehead Poetry Book Prize.

== Personal life and death ==
Clifford had four children, including the historian Rebecca Clifford. His daughter Annie Clifford was a founding member of the indie folk band The Gertrudes. Late in life he developed Parkinson's disease. He died on Grand Manan on 15 April 2025, at the age of 80.

== Bibliography ==
=== Poetry books ===
- Man in a Window. Toronto: Coach House, 1965.
- Alphabook. Kingston, Ontario: MakeWork, 1972.
- Glass.Passages. Ottawa, Ontario: Oberon, 1976.
- An Ache in the Ear. Toronto, Ontario: Coach House, 1979.
- On Abducting the 'Cello. Erin, Ontario: Porcupine's Quill, 2004.
- The Book of Were. Erin, Ontario: Porcupine's Quill, 2006.
- The Exile's Papers: The Duplicity of Autobiography, Part One. Erin, Ontario: Porcupine's Quill, 2007.
- The Exile's Papers: The Face as its Thousand Ships, Part Two. Erin, Ontario: Porcupine's Quill, 2009.
- Jane Again. Emeryville, Ontario: Biblioasis, 2009.
- Learning to Dance with a Peg Leg. Victoria, British Columbia: Frog Hollow Press, 2009.
- The Exile's Papers: The Dirt's Passion Is Flesh Sorrow, Part Three. Erin, Ontario: Porcupine's Quill, 2011.
- b.p. Nichol & Wayne Clifford, Theseus: A Collaboration. Toronto, Ontario: BookThug, 2014.
- The Exile's Papers: Just Beneath Your Skin, The Dark Begins, Part Four. Erin, Ontario, Porcupine's Quill, 2016.
- Flying the Truck. Saint John, NB: New Brunswick Museum, 2017.

=== Chapbooks and anthologies ===
- Eighteen. Toronto: Coach House, 1966.
- For Everyone. Toronto: Fleye Press, 1967.
- Music for the Words. Iowa City, privately printed, 1967.
- The Machinery. Iowa City: D Press, 1968.
- A Bestiary for Caitlin. M. Lally, ed. Iowa City: Living Series/Make Work Press, 1969.
- Whale Sound. G. Gatenby, ed. Toronto, J.J. Douglas, 1976.
- The Story so Far 5. D. Barbour, ed. Toronto, Coach House Press, 1978.
- Written in Stone: A Kingston Reader. M.A. Downie and M.A. Thompson, eds. Kingston, Quarry Press, 1993.
- Jailbreaks: 99 Canadian Sonnets. Z. Wells, ed. Emeryville, Biblioasis, 2008.
- Approaches to Poetry: The Pre-Poem Moment. S. Neilson, ed. Victoria, Frog Hollow Press, 2009.
- The Dark Season. Emeryville, Biblioasis, 2012.
- Earth and Heaven: An Anthology of Myth Poetry. A. Jernigan and E. Jones, eds. Markham, Fitzhenry & Whiteside, 2015.

=== Criticism ===
- Neilson, Shane (2011). Fatherhood: The Poetry of Wayne Clifford. Victoria, BC: Frog Hollow Press. ISBN 9781926948010.
- Neilson, Shane; Lane, M. Travis; Donaldson, Jeffery; Ruthig, Ingrid (2018). AM, BE: The Poetry of Wayne Clifford. Victoria, BC: Frog Hollow Press. ISBN 978-1-926948-61-4.
