= The Ocean at the End =

Studio album by The Tea Party
- Released: September 8, 2014
- Genre: Rock
- Length: 56:33
- Label: Anthem Entertainment
- Producer: Jeff Martin

The Tea Party chronology
Live From Australia (2012)	The Ocean at the End (2014)	Tx 20 (2017)

Singles from The Ocean at the End
- 1. "The Black Sea"; 2. "The Ocean at the End"

The Ocean at the End is the eighth studio album by Canadian rock band The Tea Party, released in Canada and Australia on September 8, 2014. It was their first album after the band reunited in 2011. The album comes ten years after their previous album, Seven Circles (2004). It reached number 17 on the Canadian Albums Chart, and entered the ARIA Albums Chart at number 18.

== Track listing ==
All tracks are written by The Tea Party, except "The Maker", written and composed by Daniel Lanois

The Ocean at the End track listing
No.	Title	Length
1.	"The L.O.C"	4:14
2.	"The Black Sea"	3:59
3.	"Cypher"	3:58
4.	"The Maker"	4:11
5.	"Black Roses"	5:29
6.	"Brazil"	4:44
7.	"The 11th Hour"	4:59
8.	"Submission"	3:54
9.	"The Cass Corridor"	2:41
10.	"Water's on Fire"	4:45
11.	"The Ocean at the End"	8:37
12.	"Into the Unknown" (hidden track)	5:02

== Personnel ==
Band

- Jeff Burrows – drums, percussion, backing vocals
- Stuart Chatwood – bass guitar, keyboards, harmonium, mandolin, acoustic guitar, backing vocals
- Jeff Martin – guitar, acoustic guitar, Therevox, esraj, oud, bowed guitar, lead vocals

Guest musicians

- Ian Anderson – flute on "The Ocean at the End"
- Aline Morales, Maninho Costa, and Riquinho Fernandes – additional Brazilian percussion on "Brazil"
- Jamie Ashforth – harmonica on "The Cass Corridor"
- Jeff & the Craibettes – backing vocals on "The Cass Corridor"
- Lucky Oceans – pedal steel on "Black Roses"

== Charts ==
Chart performance for The Ocean at the End
Chart (2014)	Peak position
Australian Albums (ARIA)	18
Canadian Albums (Billboard)	17
Dutch Albums (Album Top 100)	87
