= Intercourse =

Intercourse most often refers to:

- Interpersonal communication, talk, any kind of human communication and/or interaction
- Sexual intercourse, a human sexual activity

Intercourse may also refer to:

== Places ==
- Intercourse, Alabama, US
- Intercourse, Pennsylvania, US
- Intercourse Island, Western Australia

== Arts and media ==
=== Books ===
- Intercourse (book), 1987, by Andrea Dworkin
- InterCourses: An Aphrodisiac Cookbook, a 1997 book by Martha Hopkins and Randall Lockridge with photography by Ben Fink

=== Music ===
- Intercourse (The Tokens album), a 1971 album by American vocal group the Tokens
- Intercourse (S'Express album), a 1991 studio album by English dance music act S'Express
- "Intercourse", a 2020 song by Megan Thee Stallion featuring Popcaan and Mustard from Good News

=== Other arts and media ===
- The Intercourse, an arts center in Brooklyn, New York, US
- Intercourse (magazine), a literary magazine published in Montreal from 1966 to 1971

== See also ==
- Non-Intercourse Act (1809), U.S. law
- Nonintercourse Act, family of U.S. laws related to Native American tribal rights
