= Lisa Alward =

Canadian writer (born 1962)

Lisa Alward (born 1962) is a Canadian short story writer based in Fredericton, New Brunswick.

Originally from Halifax, Nova Scotia, Alward was educated at the University of Toronto for an English degree and Queen Mary University of London for an MA, and worked in publishing for many years, returning to creative writing after turning 50 in 2012.

Alward won The Fiddlehead's Short Fiction Prize in 2015 for her short story "Cocktail", and The New Quarterly's Peter Hinchcliffe Award for Short Fiction in 2016 for her story "Old Growth". Both are included in Cocktail, published by Biblioasis in 2023, which won the Danuta Gleed Literary Award for the best first collection of short fiction published by a Canadian in English, as well as the New Brunswick 2024 Mrs. Dunster's Award for Fiction, and was longlisted for the 2024 Carol Shields Prize for Fiction.
