= M. Travis Lane =

American poet

- Born: Millicent Elizabeth Travis; 23 September 1934 (age 92); San Antonio, Texas
- Citizenship: Canadian
- Education: Vassar College (AB); Cornell University (MA, PhD)
- Spouse: Lauriat Lane Jr.
- Children: 2
- Writing career
- Genre: Poetry

Millicent Travis Lane (known as M. Travis Lane; born 23 September 1934) is an American-born Canadian poet based in Fredericton, New Brunswick.

== Early and personal life ==
Millicent Travis was born into a military family in San Antonio, Texas on 23 September 1934. Her father, United States Army Colonel William Livingston Travis, was a 1933 West Point graduate who won the Distinguished Flying Cross during World War II. Her mother was Elsie Ward Travis. Millicent had one sister. During her childhood the family moved often because of her father's military postings. Her parents introduced her to poetry at an early age and she began writing poems as a young child.

She attended Vassar College and graduated with a Bachelor of Arts degree in 1956. In 1957, she was awarded a Master of Arts degree by Cornell University for her thesis The Fences of Robert Frost: The Changes in his Ways of Approaching Philosophical Problems. She earned a PhD from Cornell in 1967 for her dissertation on Robert Frost's poetic style entitled Agnosticism as Technique.

She and her husband Lauriat Lane Jr. moved to Fredericton in 1960 with their one-year-old daughter. Their second child, a son, was born in Canada. In 1973, M. Travis Lane, her husband and her two children became Canadian citizens. Lauriat Lane Jr. taught English at the University of New Brunswick until 1990 and was named an emeritus professor on his retirement. He died in 2005.

In 1967, M. Travis Lane was named an honorary research associate in the English department of the University of New Brunswick. She has taught courses in contemporary American poetry and West Indian writing, as well as English survey courses. She has also been an external reader for several theses and a reviewer for periodicals including The Fiddlehead. She belongs to the Canadian Voice of Women for Peace and is a Raging Granny.

== Poetry ==
M. Travis Lane has said that she "always intended to be a poet" and that she decided after completing her PhD to "take myself seriously as a poet" rather than pursuing a career as a university professor. Between 1969 and 2015, she has published 15 solo books and chapbooks, and her work has appeared in more than 30 anthologies. Her 1980 book Divinations and Shorter Poems won the inaugural Pat Lowther Award for the year's best book of poetry by a Canadian woman. Her other awards include the Banff Centre Bliss Carman Poetry Award for her poem "The Safety Net". In 2003, she was awarded the Alden Nowlan Award for Excellence in English Literature for "outstanding contribution to the arts in New Brunswick by a native or resident New Brunswicker".

Lane's output is various in form. Her fellow poet, editor and critic Jeanette Lynes lists "long narrative poems..., dialogic poems composed in dramatic structures; spare, epigrammatic poems; ekphrasis poems; and open-form lyrics", along with "visual poems and epistolary forms" among the forms her work has taken. Lynes notes that Lane's "primary compositional investment" is in "the sonic elements of language—noise, the play of sound" rather than in the subject matter of the poem. In response to an interviewer's question about her writing process, Lane has said "I think a lot about how it [the poem] sounds, and I revise a great deal to get the sound right for the subject". Lynes identifies the main broad concerns of Lane's work as "aesthetic, ethical/political, and environmental". Lane herself has said that she is inspired to write by "everything: nature, science, the news, art, music, something someone has said, most of all, other poetry". Spirituality is also an important aspect of Lane's poetry. Her work has been compared with that of Emily Dickinson and Margaret Avison Lane has said that Alden Nowlan was the most influential of the Maritime provinces poets on her work.

M. Travis Lane is Honorary President of the Writers' Federation of New Brunswick and was a founding member of the organization. She is a Life Member of the League of Canadian Poets.

== Awards and recognition ==
- 1952: winner, Mary Hardin-Baylor Prize (Mary Hardin-Baylor College, Texas)
- 1975, 1980: winner, Northern Lights Editor's Prize
- 1981: winner, Pat Lowther Award, Divinations and Shorter Poems
- 1982: winner, Arc Poetry Prize
- 1991: winner, Fiddlehead Poetry Prize
- 1994: winner, Writers' Federation of New Brunswick Poetry Prize
- 1997: winner, Amethyst Review Prize
- 2001: winner, Atlantic Poetry Prize
- 2002: winner, Atlantic Poetry Prize, Keeping Afloat
- 2003: winner, Alden Nowlan Award for Excellence in English Literature
- 2006: winner, Banff Centre Bliss Carman Poetry Award
- 2015: shortlist, Governor General's Award for English-language poetry, Crossover
- 2016: winner, Lieutenant-Governor's Award for High Achievement in English Literary Arts

== Bibliography ==
- 1969: An Inch or so of Garden (University of New Brunswick, limited edition)
- 1973: Poems 1968–1972 (Fiddlehead) ISBN 0-919197-24-8
- 1977: Homecomings (Goose Lane) ISBN 0-919197-99-X
- 1980: Divinations and Shorter Poems (Fiddlehead) ISBN 0-920110-87-8
- 1988: Reckonings (Goose Lane) ISBN 0-86492-071-7
- 1989: Solid Things (Cormorant) ISBN 0-920953-17-4
- 1993: Temporary Shelter (Goose Lane) ISBN 0-86492-148-9
- 1994: Night Physics (Brick) ISBN 0-919626-70-X
- 2001: Keeping Afloat (Guernica) ISBN 1-55071-131-8
- Touch Earth. Guernica Editions. 2006. ISBN 978-1-55071-231-5.
- Jeanette Lynes, ed. (2007). The crisp day closing on my hand: the poetry of M. Travis Lane. Wilfrid Laurier University Press. ISBN 978-1-55458-025-5.
- 2010: The Book of Widows (Frog Hollow Press) ISBN 978-0-9865437-0-8
- 2010: The All-Nighter's Radio (Guernica Press) ISBN 978-1-55071-319-0
- 2012: Ash Steps (Cormorant Press) ISBN 978-1-77086-096-4
- 2015: Crossover (Cormorant Press) ISBN 978-1-77086-440-5
- 2016: The Witch of the Inner Wood: Collected Long Poems (Goose Lane) ISBN 978-0-86492-899-3, Shane Neilson, ed.
