= Douglas Burnet Smith =

Canadian poet (born 1949)

Douglas Burnet Smith (born 1949 in Winnipeg, Manitoba, Canada) is a Canadian poet. He is the author of fifteen volumes of poetry. His Voices from a Farther Room was nominated for the Governor General's Award, the most prestigious literary award in Canada. In addition to winning numerous poetry awards, in 1989 Mr. Smith won The Malahat Review’s Long Poem Prize. He has also represented Canada at international writers’ festivals and has served as the President of the League of Canadian Poets and as Chair of the Public Lending Right Commission of Canada. His poetry has also been published in numerous literary periodicals and anthologies. He was twice a member of the Poetry Jury for the Canada Council for the Arts' Governor General's Literary Awards, in 1988 and again in 2011.

He currently teaches English literature and creative writing at St. Francis Xavier University in Antigonish, Nova Scotia.

== Works ==
- White Corvettes (The Alfred Gustav Press, 2015)
- Nine Kinds of Light (The Alfred Gustav Press, 2013)
- Learning to Count. (Frontenac House, 2010)
- Sister Prometheus. (Wolsak & Wynn, 2008)
- Helsinki Drift. (Beach Holme Books, 2002)
- Chainletter. (Trout Lily Press, 2001)
- The Killed. (Wolsak & Wynn, 2000)
- Thaw. (Four Humours Press, 1977)
- Scarecrow. (Turnstone Press, 1980)
- Light of Our Bones. (Turnstone Press, 1980)
- Living in the Cave of the Mouth. (Owl's Head Press, 1987)
- Ladder to the Moon. (Brick Books, 1988)
- The KnifeThrower's Partner. (Wolsak and Wynn, 1989)
- Voices from a Farther Room. (Wolsak and Wynn, 1992)
- Two Minutes for Holding. (House of Anansi, 1995)

=== Poetry published in anthologies ===
- New Life in Dark Seas, ed. Stan Dragland (Brick Books, 2000), 126.
- The Windhorse Reader: Choice Poems of ’93, ed. John Castlebury (Yarmouth, N.S.), 1993.
- Let The Earth Take Note: First Anthology of the Milton Acorn Festival 1987-91 (Charlottetown: Milton Acorn Festival Publishing, 1994.
- Draft: An Anthology of Prairie Poetry, ed. Dennis Cooley, (Turnstone Press, 1981), 143-45.
- Section Lines, ed. Marc Duncan, (Turnstone Press, 1988), 197-98.
- The Lyric Paragraph, ed. Robert Allen, (D.C. Books, Montreal, 1987), 144-46.
- Arrivals: Canadian Poetry in the Eighties, ed. Bruce Meyer The Greenfield Review, 1986), 185.
- Coastlines: The Poetry of Atlantic Canada ed. Anne Compton, Laurence Hutchman, Ross Leckie and Robin McGrath (Goose Lane, 2002) 163-66.

== Awards ==
Dallas Taylor Memorial Prize, 1972. Chancellor's Prize for Poetry, University of Manitoba, 1973. The Malahat Review Long Poem Prize, 1989. Governor General's Award for Poetry, finalist, 1993.
