= Ann Simpson =

Ann or Anne Simpson may refer to:

- Ann Marie Simpson (born 1979), American violinist
- Anne Simpson, Canadian poet
- Ann Simpson, character played by Robin Givens
