= Raymond Fraser =

Canadian writer

Raymond Fraser ONB
- Raymond Fraser in his Paris days
- Born: May 8, 1941; Chatham, New Brunswick
- Died: October 22, 2018 (aged 77); Fredericton, New Brunswick
- Citizenship: Canadian
- Education: St. Thomas University
- Occupation: Writer
- Writing career
- Language: English
- Notable awards: Lieutenant-Governor's Award for High Achievement in the Arts (2009)
- Website: raymondfraser.blogspot.com

Raymond Fraser (May 8, 1941 – October 22, 2018) was a Canadian biographer, editor, essayist, memoirist, novelist, poet and short story writer. Fraser published fourteen books of fiction, three of non-fiction, and eight poetry collections. Fraser's writings received positive comments from literary figures Farley Mowat, Irving Layton, Louis Dudek, Alden Nowlan, Sheila Watson, Leonard Cohen, Hugh Garner, and Michael Cook.

== Biography ==
Born in Chatham, New Brunswick, Raymond Fraser attended St. Thomas University where in his freshman year he played on the varsity hockey and football teams, and served as co-editor with John Brebner of the student literary magazine Tom-Tom in his junior year. His 20-year correspondence and friendship with the poet Alden Nowlan date from this period.

During the sixties Fraser worked as a lab technician, a high school teacher, and as editor and freelance writer for a number of tabloid newspapers.

While living in Montreal in 1966, Fraser and poet Leroy Johnson founded the literary magazine Intercourse: Contemporary Canadian Writing. In 1971 he cofounded Montreal Story Tellers Fiction Performance Group and the Rank Outsiders Poetry Extravaganza. His first book of fiction, The Black Horse Tavern (1973), was published in Montreal by Ingluvin Publications.

Fraser died in Fredericton, New Brunswick, on October 22, 2018, at the age of 77.

== Awards and recognition ==
His novel, The Bannonbridge Musicians (Ingluvin Publications) was a finalist for the 1978 Governor General's Award.

In 2009, following publication of his novel In Another Life (Lion's Head Press), Fraser received the inaugural Lieutenant-Governor's Award for High Achievement in the Arts for English Language Literary Arts.

Five of Fraser's books were listed in Atlantic Canada's 100 Greatest Books (Nimbus Publishing, 2009), a title also shared by three other authors.

In 2012, he was made a member of the Order of New Brunswick, the province's highest honour, for his contributions to literature and New Brunswick's cultural life.

In May 2016, he received an honorary Doctor of Letters degree from his alma mater, St Thomas University. In 2017, he received the Canadian Senate Sesquicentennial Medal in recognition of valuable service to the nation.

Over the years he received four Canada Council Grants, six New Brunswick Arts Board Grants, and the Canadian Writers' Trust Woodcock Grant.

== Bibliography ==
=== Fiction ===
- The Black Horse Tavern – 1973. Revised definitive edition with an Introduction by the author – 2014 (novella & stories)
- The Struggle Outside – 1975. Revised definitive edition with an Afterword by the author – 2013 (novel)
- The Bannonbridge Musicians – 1978. Revised definitive edition – 2014 (novel)
- Rum River – 1997. Revised definitive edition – 2016 (novel)
- Costa Blanca – 2001, 2013 (novella & stories)
- In a Cloud of Dust and Smoke – 2003, 2013 (novel)
- The Grumpy Man – 2008, 2013 (novella & stories)
- In Another Life – 2009, 2013 (novel)
- The Trials Of Brother Bell – 2010 (two novels, Repentance Vale & The Struggle Outside)
- The Madness Of Youth – 2011, 2013 (novel)
- Repentance Vale – 2011, 2013 (novel)
- Bliss – 2013 (stories)
- Seasons of Discontent – 2015 (novel)
- Through Sunlight and Shadows – 2018 (novel)

=== Biography ===
- The Fighting Fisherman: The Life of Yvon Durelle – 1981, 1983, 2005
- Todd Matchett: Confessions of a Young Criminal – 1994

=== Memoirs and essays ===
- When The Earth Was Flat – 2007, 2013

=== Poetry ===
- For the Miramichi – 1966
- Waiting for God's Angel – 1967
- I've Laughed and Sung – 1969
- The More I Live – 1971
- Stop The Highway... 4 Montreal Poets: Raymond Fraser, Clifford Gaston, Bob Higgins & Bryan McCarthy – 1972
- Macbride Poems – 1992
- Before You're A Stranger – 2000
- As I See it – 2017

=== eBooks ===
- The Black Horse Tavern
- Bliss
- Costa Blanca
- When The Earth Was Flat
- The Grumpy Man
- Repentance Vale

=== Anthology edited ===
- East of Canada: An Atlantic Anthology – 1977 (Eds.: Raymond Fraser, Clyde Rose and Jim Stewart)

=== Literary magazines edited ===
- Tom-Tom (St. Thomas University) Raymond Fraser and John Brebner, eds. 1962.
- Intercourse: Contemporary Canadian Writing Raymond Fraser et al., eds. 1966–1971.
- The Pottersfield Portfolio Raymond Fraser et al., eds. 1990–1992.
- Lion's Head Magazine (online) Raymond Fraser and Bernell MacDonald, eds. 2014– .
