= Valerie Sherrard =

Canadian writer

- Born: Valerie Anne Russell; May 16, 1957 (age 69); Moose Jaw, Saskatchewan, Canada
- Occupation: Author
- Spouse: Brent Sherrard (m. 1999)
- Children: 3
- Writing career
- Genre: Children's Literature
- Notable work: The Glory Wind

Valerie Anne Sherrard (née Russell: born May 16, 1957) is a Canadian author of books for children and young adults including the novels The Glory Wind, Kate, Speechless and the Shelby Belgarden mystery series. In 2024, she was named the Literary Arts Laureate of the New Brunswick Lieutenant Governor's Award for High Achievement in the Arts.

== Early life ==
Valerie Anne Russell was born May 16, 1957, in Moose Jaw, Saskatchewan to Robert Allan and Pauline May (née Hill) Russell. Her father was an air force mechanic, and her mother was a homemaker. She has two brothers. She was inspired to become a teacher by her sixth grade homeroom teacher while she and her family were living in Lahr, West Germany.

== Career ==
Sherrard has published thirty books, including fiction and nonfiction for children, young adults, and adults. She published her first novel, Out of the Ashes, in 2002, the first book of the Shelby Belgarden Mysteries series. This was followed by In Too Deep (2003), Chasing Shadows (2004), Hiding in Plain Sight (2005), Eyes of a Stalker (2006), and Searching for Yesterday (2008).

=== Awards and honours ===
In 2024, Sherrard was named the Literary Arts Laureate of the New Brunswick Lieutenant Governor's Award for High Achievement in the Arts.

Booklist included Tumbleweed Skies on their 2010 list of the year's best books for youth, as well as their 2011 list of the "Top 10 Historical Fiction for Youth".

Awards for Sherrard's work
Year	Title	Award	Result	Ref.
2003	Out of the Ashes: A Shelby Belgarden Mystery	Blue Spruce Award	Finalist	
2008	Speechless	Ann Connor Brimer Award	Finalist	
2010	Tumbleweed Skies	Ann Connor Brimer Award	Finalist	
2011	The Glory Wind	Ann Connor Brimer Award	Winner	
2011	The Glory Wind	Canadian Library Association Book of the Year for Children Award	Finalist	
2011	The Glory Wind	Geoffrey Bilson Award	Winner	
2011	The Glory Wind	Forest of Reading Silver Birch Award	Finalist	
2011	The Glory Wind	TD Canadian Children's Literature Award	Finalist	
2012	Testify	Forest of Reading Red Maple Award	Finalist	
2013	Counting Back from Nine	Governor General's Award for English-language children's literature	Finalist	
2015	Driftwood	Canadian Library Association Book of the Year for Children Award	Finalist	
2016	Rain Shadow	Ann Connor Brimer Award	Finalist	
2022	Birdspell	Mrs. Dunster's Fiction Prize	Shortlist	
2023	A Bend in the Breeze	Mrs. Dunster's Fiction Prize	Shortlist	
2024	More than Words: Navigating the Complex World of Communication	WFNB Nonfiction Award	Shortlist	
2024	Standing on Neptune	Mrs. Dunster's Fiction Prize	Shortlist	
2024	An Unbalanced Force	New Brunswick Book Award for Books for Youth and Young Adults	Winner	
2025	Standing on Neptune	Ann Connor Brimer Award	Winner	

== Personal life ==
Russell married carpenter Brent Ronald Sherrard on June 26, 1999. She has three children, as well as three step-children. Additionally, between 1986 and 1999, she fostered approximately 70 teenagers.

Sherrard lives in Miramichi, New Brunswick.

== Selected works ==
=== Picture and chapter books ===
- There's a COW Under my Bed!, Tuckamore Books, 2008, illustrated by David Jardine.
- There's a GOLDFISH in My Shoe!, Tuckamore Books, 2009, illustrated by David Jardine.
- Miss Wondergem's Dreadfully Dreadful Pie, Tuckamore Books, 2011, illustrated by Wendy J Whittingham.
- Down Here, Fitzhenry & Whiteside, 2015, illustrated by Isabelle Malenfant.
- Cooper Clark and the Dragon Lady, Fitzhenry & Whiteside, 2019, illustrated by David Jardine.

=== Middle grade and young adult novels ===
- Kate, Dundurn, 2003.
- Sam's Light, Dundurn, 2004.
- Sarah's Legacy, Dundurn, 2006.
- Speechless, Dundurn, 2007.
- Three Million Acres of Flame, Dundurn, 2007.
- Watcher, Dundurn, 2009.
- Tumbleweed Skies, Fitzhenry & Whiteside, 2009.
- The Glory Wind, Fitzhenry & Whiteside, 2010.
- Accomplice, Dundurn, 2011.
- Testify, Dundurn, 2011.
- Counting Back from Nine, Fitzhenry & Whiteside, 2012.
- Driftwood, Fitzhenry & Whiteside, 2013.
- Rain Shadow, Fitzhenry & Whiteside, 2014.
- Random Acts, PenguinRandomHouse Canada, 2015.
- The Rise and Fall of Derek Cowell, DCB, 2020.
- Birdspell, DCB, 2021.
- A Bend in the Breeze, DCB, 2022.
- Standing on Neptune, DCB, 2023.
- An Unbalanced Force, DCB, 2024.
- Absolutely No Body Parts, DCB, 2026.

=== The Shelby Belgarden Mysteries ===
- Out of the Ashes, Dundurn, 2002.
- In Too Deep, Dundurn, 2003.
- Chasing Shadows, Dundurn, 2004.
- Hiding in Plain Sight, Dundurn, 2005.
- Eyes of a Stalker, Dundurn, 2006.
- Searching for Yesterday, Dundurn, 2008.

=== Non-fiction ===
- More than Words: Navigating the Complex World of Communication, DCB, 2023, with Natalie Hyde, Artwork by David Jardine.
