= Riel Nason =

Canadian novelist and artist

- Born: 1969 (age 56–57); Hawkshaw, New Brunswick, Canada
- Occupations: Novelist, quilter
- Writing career
- Period: 2010s-present
- Notable work: The Town That Drowned
- Notable awards: Commonwealth Book Prize (2012); Mrs. Dunster's Fiction Prize (2021); Alice Kitts Memorial Award (2022)

Riel Nason (born 1969) is a Canadian novelist and textile artist who works with quilting. Her debut novel, The Town That Drowned, published in 2011 by Goose Lane Editions, won the Commonwealth Book Prize for Canada and Europe in 2012. As a textile artist, Nason's work has been the centre of multiple exhibits.

== Biography ==
Riel Nason was born 1969 and grew up in Hawkshaw, New Brunswick, graduating from Nackawic Senior High School.

Nason published her debut novel, The Town That Drowned, with Goose Lane Editions in 2011. The following year, the novel won the Commonwealth Book Prize for Canada and Europe, as well as the Margaret and John Savage First Book Award. It was also nominated for the Dublin Literary Award.

Her second novel, All The Things we Leave Behind (2016) was also published Lane Editions. It was a finalist for the 2017 Mrs. Dunster's Fiction Prize.

The following two years, Nason published two quilting-related books: Modern Selvage Quilting (2016) and Sew a Modern Halloween (2017).

Nason's first children's book, The Little Ghost Who Was a Quilt, illustrated by Byron Eggenschwiler, was published by Tundra Books in 2020. A follow-up picture book, The Little Ghost Quilt's Winter Surprise, published in 2024, was a finalist for the 2025-26 Alice Kitts Memorial Award.

Also in 2020, Nason published Waiting Under Water. The novel won the 2021 Mrs. Dunster's Fiction Prize.

The following year, Nason published the picture book Disaster at the Highland Games, illustrated by Nathasha Pilotte. The book had a Scottish Gaelic edition published that was shortlisted for the Best Book for Children/Youth at the 2022 Gaelic Literature Awards. The English also won the 2022 Alice Kitts Memorial Award. In 2023, Nason published Catastrophe at the Christmas Celidh.

As of 2025, Nason lived in Quispamsis, New Brunswick. She has at least one child.

== Bibliography ==
- The Town That Drowned (2011, ISBN 9780864926401)
- All The Things We Leave Behind (2016, ISBN 9780864920416)
- Modern Selvage Quilting (2016, ISBN 9781617450846)
- Sew a Modern Halloween (2017, ISBN 9781617454837)
- The Little Ghost Who Was a Quilt (2020, ISBN 9781774887189)
- Waiting Under Water (2020, ISBN 9781443175142)
- Disaster at the Highland Games (2021, ISBN 9781778610158)
- Catastrophe at the Christmas Celidh (2023, ISBN 9781778610271)
- The Little Ghost Quilt's Winter Surprise
