= Robert Moore (poet) =

Robert Moore (born in Hamilton, Ontario) is a Canadian poet, actor, director, playwright, and professor. He has written over a dozen plays that have been performed across Canada, and he has published five books of poetry. So Rarely in Our Skins was a finalist for the 6th Annual Atlantic Poetry Prize, the Margaret and John Savage First Book Award and, along with his two subsequent books, was long-listed for the ReLit Award in Poetry. Moore's poetry has been published in literary journals such as Descant, The Fiddlehead, Wascana Review, Ink Magazine, Canadian Author, The New Quarterly, Maissoneuve, Pottersfield Portfolio, Gaspereau Review, Prairie Fire, Quadrant Magazine, and Contemporary Verse II. He has been the recipient of the Edmonton Journal Literary Award for poetry (1987) as well as a finalist for the Pottersfield Portfolio Short Poetry Award (1997), The Writers’ Federation of New Brunswick Alfred G. Bailey Prize (2001) and The New Brunswick Literary Award for Poetry (2016).

== Bibliography ==
- So Rarely in Our Skins, The Muse's Company, 2002
- Museum Absconditum, Wolsak & Wynn, 2006
- Figuring Ground, Wolsak & Wynn, 2009
- The Golden Book of Bovinities, Signal Editions, 2012
- Based on Actual Events, Signal Editions, 2016
