= Julia McCarthy =

Canadian poet (1964–2021)

Julia McCarthy (1964–2021) was a Canadian poet. She was most noted for her 2017 collection All the Names Between, which was a shortlisted finalist for the Governor General's Award for English-language poetry at the 2017 Governor General's Awards. The collection was also honoured with the J. M. Abraham Poetry Award (formerly the Atlantic Poetry Prize).

McCarthy previously published the poetry collections Stormthrower (2002) and Return from Erebus (2010). Return from Erebus won the Poetry Award from the Canadian Authors Association in 2012.

Originally from Toronto, McCarthy lived in various places (Alaska and Georgia in the U.S., Norway, South Africa) before moving to Nova Scotia, where she lived for many years in the Annapolis Valley as a freelance writer, editor and potter.
