= Walter Learning =

Canadian actor (1938–2020)

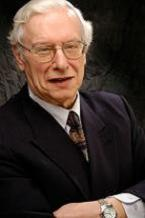
- Born: Walter John Learning; November 16, 1938; Quidi Vidi, Newfoundland
- Died: January 5, 2020 (aged 81)
- Occupations: Director, Actor, Broadcaster, Playwright
- Website: http://www.walterlearning.com

Walter John Learning (November 16, 1938 – January 5, 2020) CM ONB was a Canadian theatre director, actor, and founder of Theatre New Brunswick.

== Biography ==
Walter Learning was born in 1938 in the small village of Quidi Vidi in the Dominion of Newfoundland. Learning attended Bishop Feild College in St. John's and the University of New Brunswick in Fredericton, New Brunswick. After receiving his BA, he was awarded a Teaching Fellowship to pursue his MA, and a Commonwealth Scholarship to work on his PhD at the Australian National University in Canberra. Learning returned to Canada in May 1966. He was Director of Drama at the UNB Summer Session, and in the Fall returned to Memorial University of Newfoundland. He became a lecturer in the Philosophy Department where he remained for two years.

In May 1968, Learning moved back to Fredericton to become the General Manager of the Beaverbrook Playhouse. There he founded Theatre New Brunswick which presented its first production in January 1969. For the next forty years, TNB remained Canada's only full-time touring regional theatre. Learning remained as General Manager of The Playhouse and Artistic Director of Theatre New Brunswick for ten years. During this time, TNB produced more than 85 productions. At the time it was founded, TNB was the first professional theatre company in New Brunswick, and is now one of the longest running regional companies in Canada.

During his tenure at TNB, Learning met, and became close friends with, prominent Canadian poet Alden Nowlan. The two collaborated on a number of play scripts including: Frankenstein, The Dollar Woman, A Gift to Last, and The Incredible Murder of Cardinal Tosca. In June 1978, Learning left Fredericton for Ottawa to take the position of Head of the Theatre Section of the Canada Council for the Arts.

Learning remained at the Canada Council until 1982 when he moved to the west coast to become artistic director of the Vancouver Playhouse. After five years, he returned east to Prince Edward Island where he became the artistic director of the Charlottetown Festival. From 1992 to 1995 Learning was a freelance broadcaster, writer, actor, and director, and from 1995 to 1999 he returned to Theatre New Brunswick as Executive Producer.

During his long career, Learning guest directed at many theatres including the Stratford Festival, where he directed William Hutt in A Man for All Seasons. Other theatres include Neptune Theatre, the Dallas Theater Center, Persephone Theatre, Festival Antigonish, Lighthouse Theatre, Bastion Theatre, and Upper Canada Playhouse. Learning has been a frequent director at Australia's Canberra Repertory Society. He has also appeared as an actor at many theatres across Canada and guest-starred in a number of television shows and films, including playing the role of hockey pioneer Charles Hay in the mini-series Canada Russia '72, a film depicting the famous 1972 Summit Series.

In 2011, Learning was the recipient of the Playhouse Honours award. This annual award recognizes individuals who have made a significant contribution to community life through their work in the performing arts. In 2018, he was made a member of the Order of New Brunswick for achievements in the performing arts and for contributions to the theatre community and industry. On June 27, 2019, Governor General Julie Payette announced that Learning had been appointed to the Order of Canada, one of the country's highest honours.

R. H. Thomson's special interviews with Walter Learning are included in Theatre Museum Canada's Legend Library, a video series dedicated to preserving and celebrating Canada's performing arts heritage.

== Bibliography ==
=== Plays ===
- Frankenstein: The Man Who Became God - Clarke, Irwin, Toronto 1974 (with Alden Nowlan)
- The Dollar Woman - Playwrights Co-op, Toronto 1981 (with Alden Nowlan)
- The Incredible Murder of Cardinal Tosca - Clarke, Irwin, Toronto 1987 (with Alden Nowlan)
- A Gift To Last (with Alden Nowlan) from the teleplay by Gordon Pinsent

=== Books ===
- Gifts to Last: Stories from the Maritimes and Newfoundland, ed. Fredericton: Goose Lane Editions ISBN 0-86492-206-X
