= Patrick Woodcock =

Canadian writer (born 1968)

- Born: William Patrick Woodcock; 1968 (age 57–58); Toronto, Ontario, Canada
- Occupations: Writer; poet
- Years active: 1995–present
- Notable work: You Can't Bury Them All
- Awards: Alcuin Society Book Design Award for Poetry; Council of the Federation Literacy Award

William Patrick Woodcock (born 1968) is a Canadian writer and poet from Toronto.

== Biography ==
Patrick Woodcock was born in 1968 in Toronto, Ontario. His father is an Irishman who sang and wrote poems, and his mother taught ballet. Growing up, Woodcock studied a variety of musical instruments with his brother and sang in a choir; he attributes his career in writing to these childhood experiences, noting that he has "always had a very well-cultivated imagination".

Woodcock is described as a travelling poet. Seldom living in one area for too long, he has lived much of his life abroad, in countries such as Saudi Arabia, Oman, Bosnia, Russia, and Iraq. His work has been translated into 14 languages, published in Canada, the United States, and internationally.

Woodcock's 2016 poetry book You Can't Bury Them All won the Alcuin Society Book Design Award for Poetry, and was shortlisted for the J. M. Abraham Poetry Award. In 2024, Woodcock was awarded the Council of the Federation Literacy Award on behalf of United for Literacy for his work in the justice system of Nunavut.

== Publications ==
- Woodcock, Patrick (1995). The Six O'clock Club. Oakville, ON: Mosaic Press. ISBN 978-0-8896-2606-5.
- —; Lockett, Steve (1996). AThElia. Oakville, ON: Mosaic Press. ISBN 978-0-8896-2632-4.
- — (1999). Scarring Endymion. Oakville, ON: Mosaic Press. ISBN 978-0-8896-2661-4.
- — (2004). The Challenged One. Oakville, ON: Mosaic Press. ISBN 978-0-8896-2806-9.
- — (2009). Always Die Before Your Mother. Toronto: ECW Press. ISBN 978-1-5502-2862-5.
- — (2013). Echo Gods and Silent Mountains. Toronto: ECW Press. ISBN 978-1-7704-1086-2.
- — (2016). You Can't Bury Them All. Toronto: ECW Press. ISBN 978-1-7704-1316-0.
- — (2023). Farhang Book One. Toronto: ECW Press. ISBN 978-1-7704-1751-9.
