= A Gift to Last =

- Created by: Peter Wildeblood
- Starring: Gordon Pinsent
- Country of origin: Canada
- No. of seasons: 3
- No. of episodes: 23 (including Christmas special)

Production
- Running time: 60 minutes

Original release
- Network: CBC
- Release: December 19, 1976 – December 16, 1979

A Gift to Last is a CBC Television Christmas special broadcast in 1976, a subsequent family drama series that ran from 1978 to 1979, and a stage play based on the pilot episode.

In both the special and series, Gordon Pinsent portrayed Sgt Edgar Sturgess. The series, A Gift To Last, originated in a special of the same name, produced for Christmas 1976. In the special, written by Gordon Pinsent, Melvyn Douglas played Clement Sturgess, an elderly man who looked back on his childhood Christmases at the turn of the century, and especially to his family hero, his uncle, the colourful and irresponsible Sergeant Edgar Sturgess of the Royal Canadian Regiment, played by Pinsent himself.

== Christmas special ==
Melvyn Douglas was cast as the senior Clement Sturgess, a nephew of Sgt Edgar Sturgess. The special dramatises Clement's Christmas memories of his life around the year 1900. Mark Polley, the brother of Sarah Polley, was cast in the role of the young Clement.

== Series ==
The series was set during 1899–1905, around the time of the Second Boer War.

== Stage play ==
The pilot Christmas episode of A Gift to Last was adapted for the stage by Walter Learning and Alden Nowlan in 1978. The play has since become a perennial Canadian Christmas favourite and is regularly presented at regional theatres across the country. In 2012, Theatre Orangeville presented A Gift to Last with playwright Walter Learning in the role of the older Clement.
