= Therevox =

Canadian electronic musical instrument manufacturer

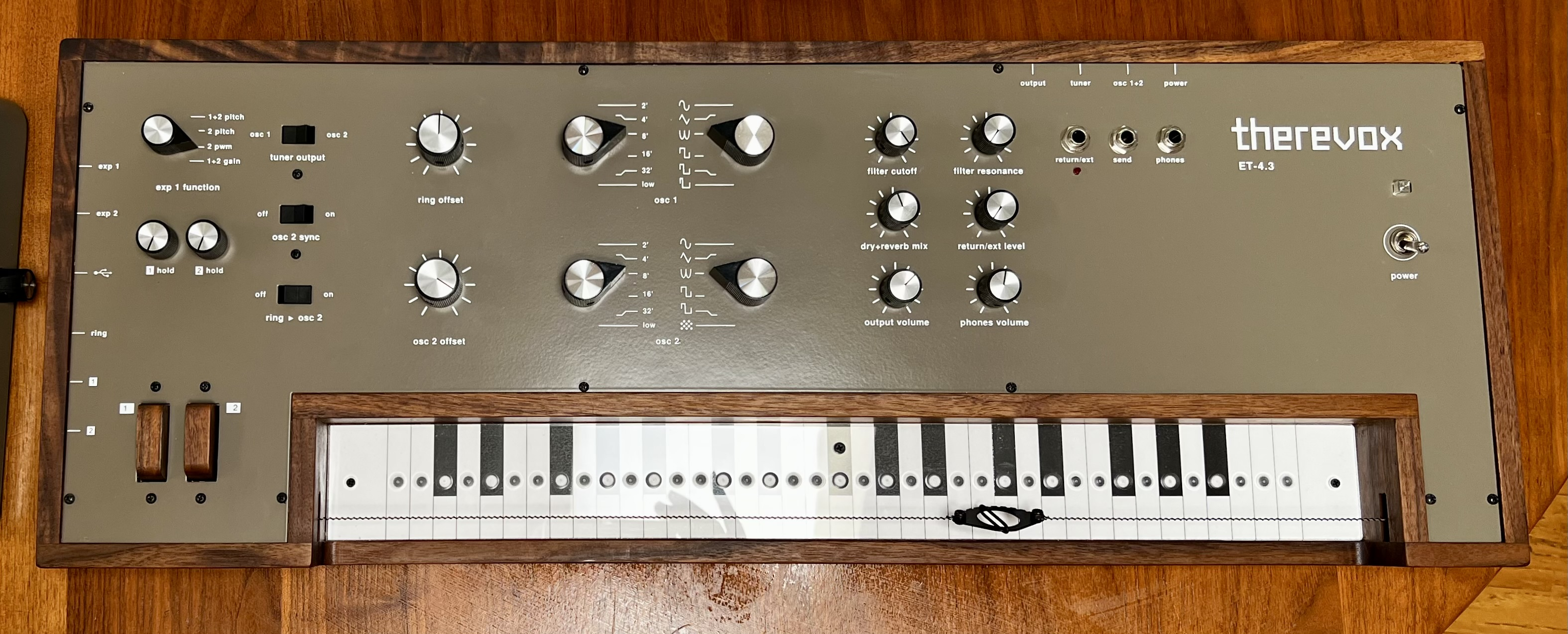
Therevox ET-4.3

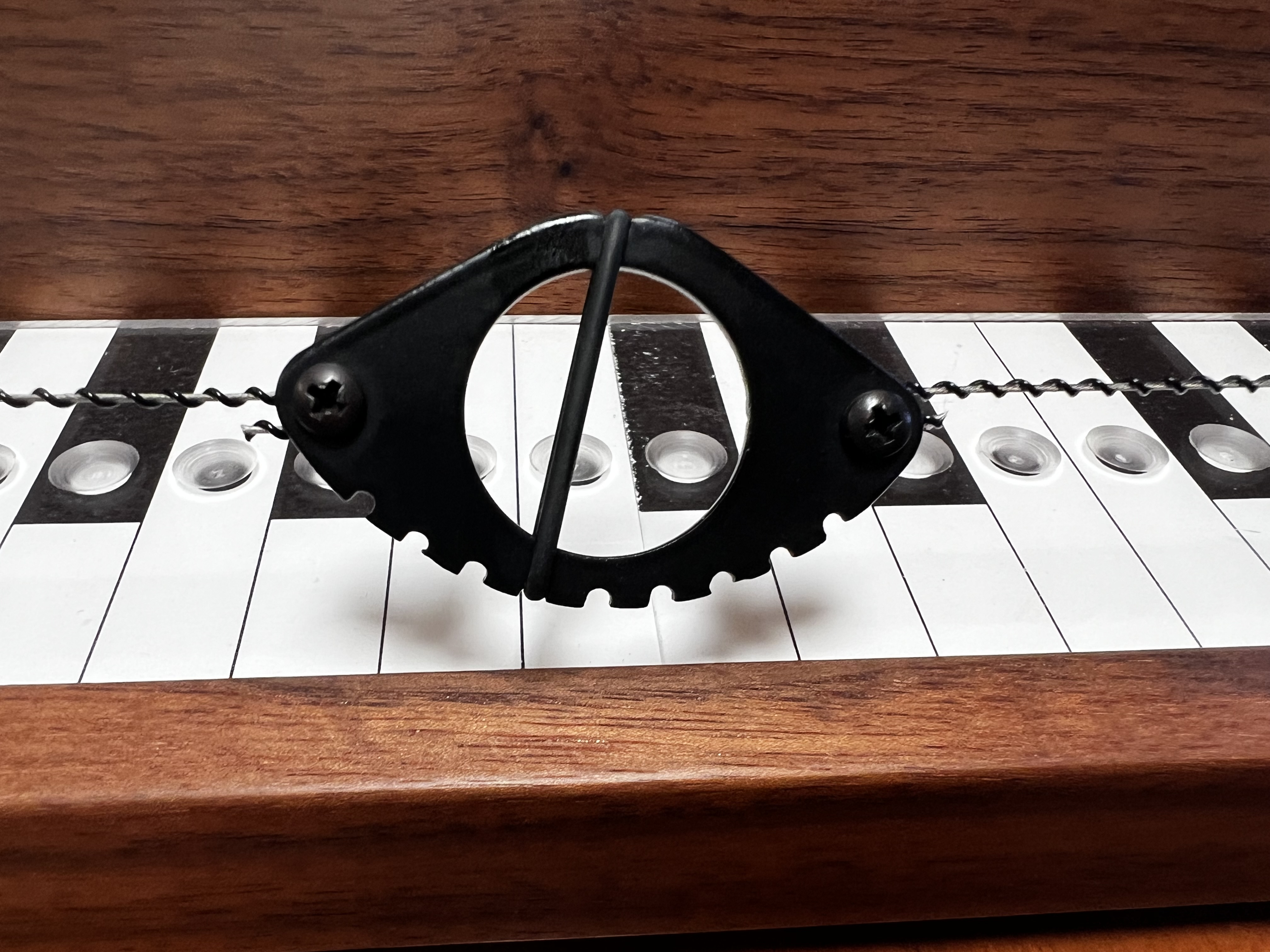
Therevox pitch control ring

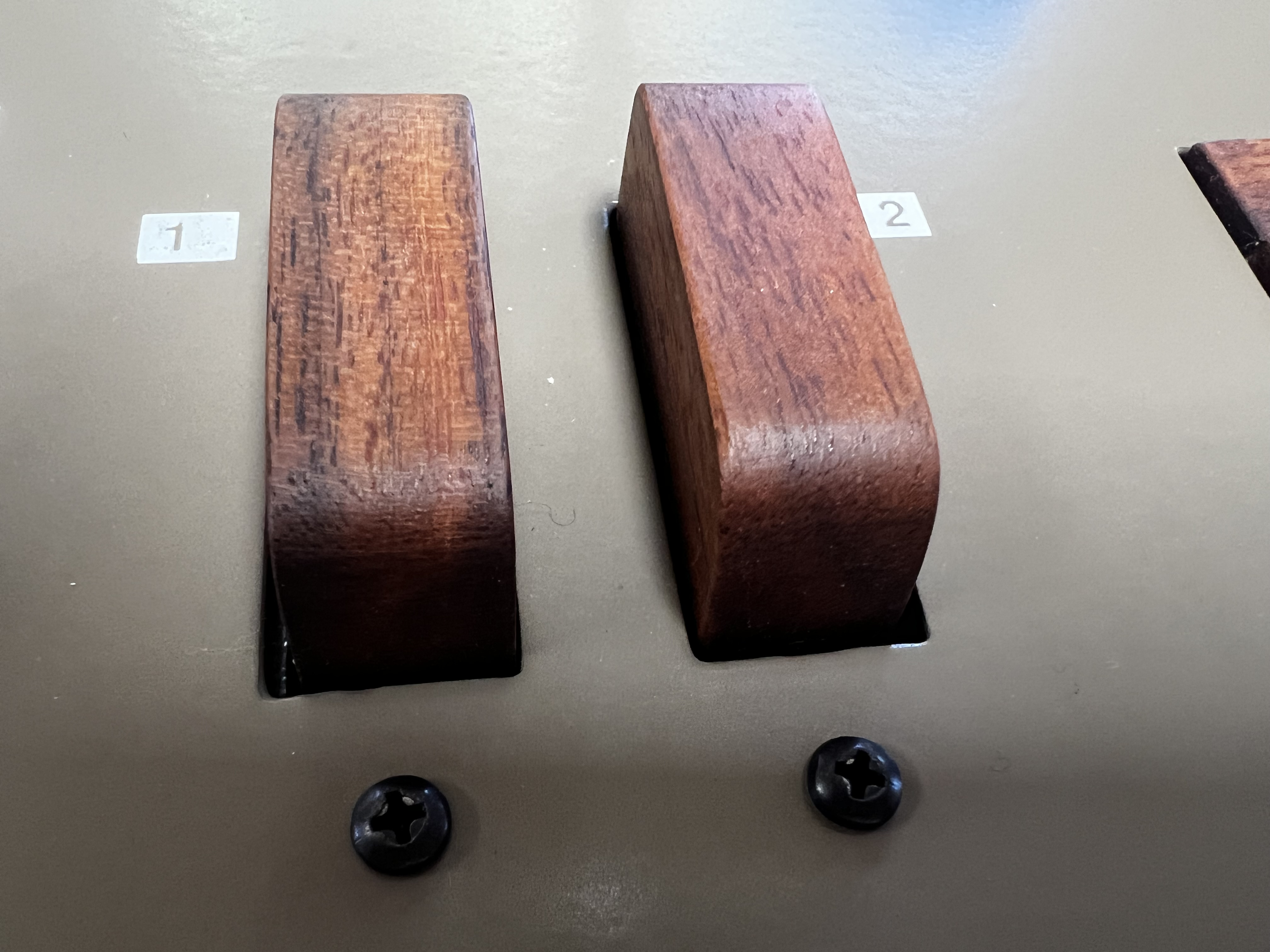
Therevox pressure-sensitive paddles

Therevox is manufacturer of custom musical instruments in Ontario, Canada. The company focuses on continuous-pitch instruments and is known for building a modern analog synthesizer inspired by the rare Ondes Martenot.

First commissioned in 2004 to build modern version of the Electro-Theremin as used by The Beach Boys on their 1966 single "Good Vibrations", only 12 of these instruments went to musicians and studios in North America and Europe. In 2010, Therevox was commissioned by Montreal's Breakglass Studio to build a new instrument and designer Mike Beauchamp combined the Ondes Martenot's au ruban and touche d’intensité interface with a dual oscillator analog synthesizer similar to the MiniMoog. The design included a built-in spring reverb and this prototype became the ET-4 model that has been available since 2012.

The last ET-4 ever produced was acquired by Canada's National Music Centre in 2019 under the condition that the instrument continues to be made available to musicians. The instrument is currently housed in Live Room B in StudioBell and is a part of the National Music Centre's "Living Collection". According to the online marketplace Reverb.com, the ET-4 was one of the most watched synthesizers of 2023.

In March 2021, the Therevox ET-5 was announced and began shipping to advance customers shortly afterwards. There is currently a two year waiting list for a new Therevox ET-5.

== Notable users of Therevox instruments ==
- Anton Sanko
- The Besnard Lakes
- Belle & Sebastian
- Beth Gibbons
- Billy Jay Stein
- Brad Mehldau
- Brian Marsella
- Chelsea Wolfe
- Coheed and Cambria
- The Decemberists
- Floating Points
- Fontaines D.C.
- The Gertrudes
- Gil Assayas
- Great Lake Swimmers
- Iron & Wine
- Jason Isbell and The 400 Unit
- Jean-Michel Blais
- Joan Shelley (played by Jeff Tweedy)
- Jon Batiste (in American Symphony (film))
- Klô Pelgag
- OneRepublic
- Pearl Jam (2024 Dark Matter World Tour, played by Josh Klinghoffer)
- San Francisco Ballet (For Mere Mortals, played by Sam Shepherd)
- Sharon Van Etten
- Suuns
- Team Me
- The Veils
- Wintersleep
- Yann Tiersen

The ET-4 and ET-5 have also been used on soundtracks for Planet Earth III, Hulu's The Handmaid's Tale (TV series), The Walking Dead: Dead City, Halo Infinite, Bad Banks, The Inventor: Out for Blood in Silicon Valley and horror film Nurse 3D starring Paz de la Huerta and the Salvatore Ferragamo inspired "White Shoe".

== See also ==
- Ondes Martenot
