= Don Domanski =

Canadian poet (1950-2020)

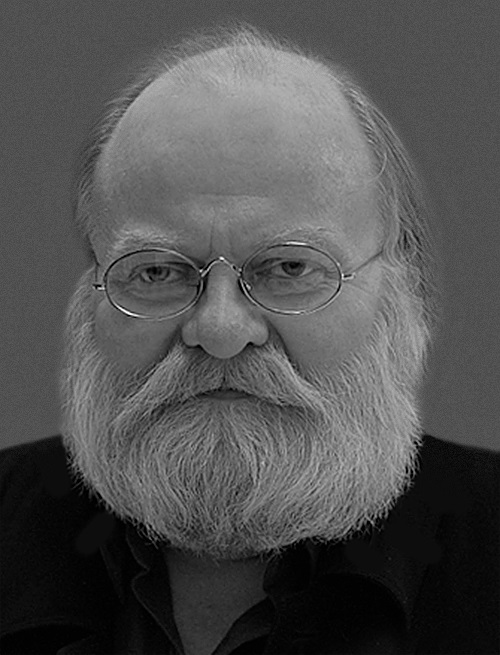
- Born: April 29, 1950; Sydney, Nova Scotia, Canada
- Died: September 7, 2020 (aged 70)
- Occupation: Poet
- Spouse: Mary Meidell

Don Domanski (April 29, 1950 – September 7, 2020) was a Canadian poet.

== Biography ==
Domanski was born and raised in Sydney, Nova Scotia, and lived briefly in Toronto, Vancouver and Wolfville, before settling in Halifax, Nova Scotia, where he lived for most of his life. Author of nine collections of poetry, his work has been translated into Arabic, Chinese, Czech, French, Portuguese, and Spanish. In a review of Wolf-Ladder John Bradley described Domanski's poetry as "earthy and astral, dark and buoyant, a cross between Robert Bly, Ted Hughes, and the Brothers Grimm."

In 1999, he received the Canadian Literary Award for Poetry from CBC (the Canadian Broadcasting Corporation). His 2007 collection All Our Wonder Unavenged was honoured with the Governor General's Award for Poetry, the Lieutenant Governor of Nova Scotia Masterworks Award, and the Atlantic Poetry Prize. In 2014, he won the J.M. Abraham Poetry Award for Bite Down Little Whisper. Domanski mentored other poets through the Banff Centre for the Arts Wired Writing Studio and the Writers' Federation of Nova Scotia Mentorship program.

Also a visual artist, he created art that appeared in galleries in Halifax and Seoul, South Korea, and on covers of his poetry collections. Domanski also collected fossils for over a decade, and subsequently turned his attention to meteorites and Stone Age tools. He found a neural arch of a 350-million-year-old (Lower Carboniferous) amphibian previously thought to have gone extinct in the Devonian period. He was given credit for the find in Amphibian Biology, Vol. 4, Palaeontology, The Evolutionary History of Amphibians, ed. Harold Heatwole and Robert L. Carroll. His interest in religions inspired visits to churches and cathedrals in France, Ireland, England and Argentina, mosques in Istanbul, Rumi's tomb in Konya, and Buddhist temples and monasteries in China.

== Bibliography ==
=== Poetry collections ===
- 1975: The Cape Breton Book of the Dead (House of Anansi Press)
- 1978: Heaven (House of Anansi Press)
- 1982: War in an Empty House (House of Anansi Press)
- 1986: Hammerstroke (House of Anansi Press)
- 1991: Wolf-Ladder (Coach House Press) (shortlisted for a Governor General's Award)
- 1994: Stations of the Left Hand (Coach House Press) (shortlisted for a Governor General's Award)
- 1998: Parish of the Physic Moon (McClelland & Stewart)
- 2007: All Our Wonder Unavenged (Brick Books) (winner of the Governor General's Award, The Atlantic Poetry Prize and the Lieutenant Governor of Nova Scotia Masterworks Award)
- 2013: Bite Down Little Whisper (Brick Books) (shortlisted for a Governor General's Award; winner of J. M. Abraham Poetry Prize)
- 2021: Fetishes of the Floating World (Brick Books)

=== Pamphlets ===
- 2006: All Our Wonder Unavenged (Jack Pine Press)
- 2006: Poetry and the Sacred (Ralph Gustafson Lecture, Institute for Coastal Research)
- 2014: Field Notes (Corbel Stone Press)
- 2015: Fetishes of the Floating World (espresso)

=== Anthologies ===
- 2007: Earthly Pages: The Poetry of Don Domanski (Wilfrid Laurier University Press)
- 2021: Selected Poems, 1975-2021 (Hardcover) (Corbel Stone Press)
- 2022: Selected Poems, 1975-2021 (Softcover) (Xylem Books)

== Honours ==
- 1999 – Canadian Literary Award for Poetry (Canadian Broadcasting Corporation)
- 2007 – Governor General's Award for All Our Wonder Unavenged
- 2008 – The Atlantic Poetry Prize for All Our Wonder Unavenged
- 2008 – Lieutenant Governor of Nova Scotia Masterworks Award for All Our Wonder Unavenged
- 2014 – J.M. Abraham Poetry Award for Bite Down Little Whisper
