= Kerry Lee Powell =

Canadian writer

- Born: Montreal, Quebec
- Occupation: Poet, short story writer
- Period: 2010s–present
- Notable works: Willem de Kooning's Paintbrush
- Notable awards: Mrs. Dunster's Fiction Prize (2017)

Kerry Lee Powell is a Canadian writer. Her works include the poetry collections The Wreckage (2013) and Inheritance (2014), as well as the short story collection Willem de Kooning's Paintbrush.

Powell was received multiple honors for her writing. In 2013, her short fiction won The Malahat Review’s Far Horizons Award for Short Fiction and the Boston Review’s Aura Estrada Short Story Contest. Inheritance was a finalist for the 2015 Gerald Lampert Award. The following year, Willem de Kooning's Paintbrush was shortlisted for the Rogers Writers' Trust Fiction Prize and the Governor General's Award for English-language fiction, and was longlisted for the Scotiabank Giller Prize. In 2017, Willem de Kooning's Paintbrush also won the Mrs. Dunster's Fiction Prize, and was a finalist for the Alistair MacLeod Prize for Short Fiction.

Powell was born in Montreal. She has stated that her interest in writing about trauma due to her upbringing. Her parents had a significant gap in age, and her father fought in World War II, from which he developed post-traumatic stress disorder. He died by suicide when Powell was 18 years old. Powell has resided in Australia, Antigua, and the United Kingdom, where she studied Medieval and Renaissance literature at Cardiff University. As of 2016, she lived in Moncton, New Brunswick.

== Books ==
=== Short story collections ===
- —— (2016). Willem de Kooning's Paintbrush. HarperCollins.

=== Poetry collections ===
- —— (2013). The Wreckage. Grey Suit Editions. ISBN 9781903006054.
- —— (2014). Inheritance. Biblioasis. ISBN 9781927428795.
