= Amber McMillan =

Canadian writer

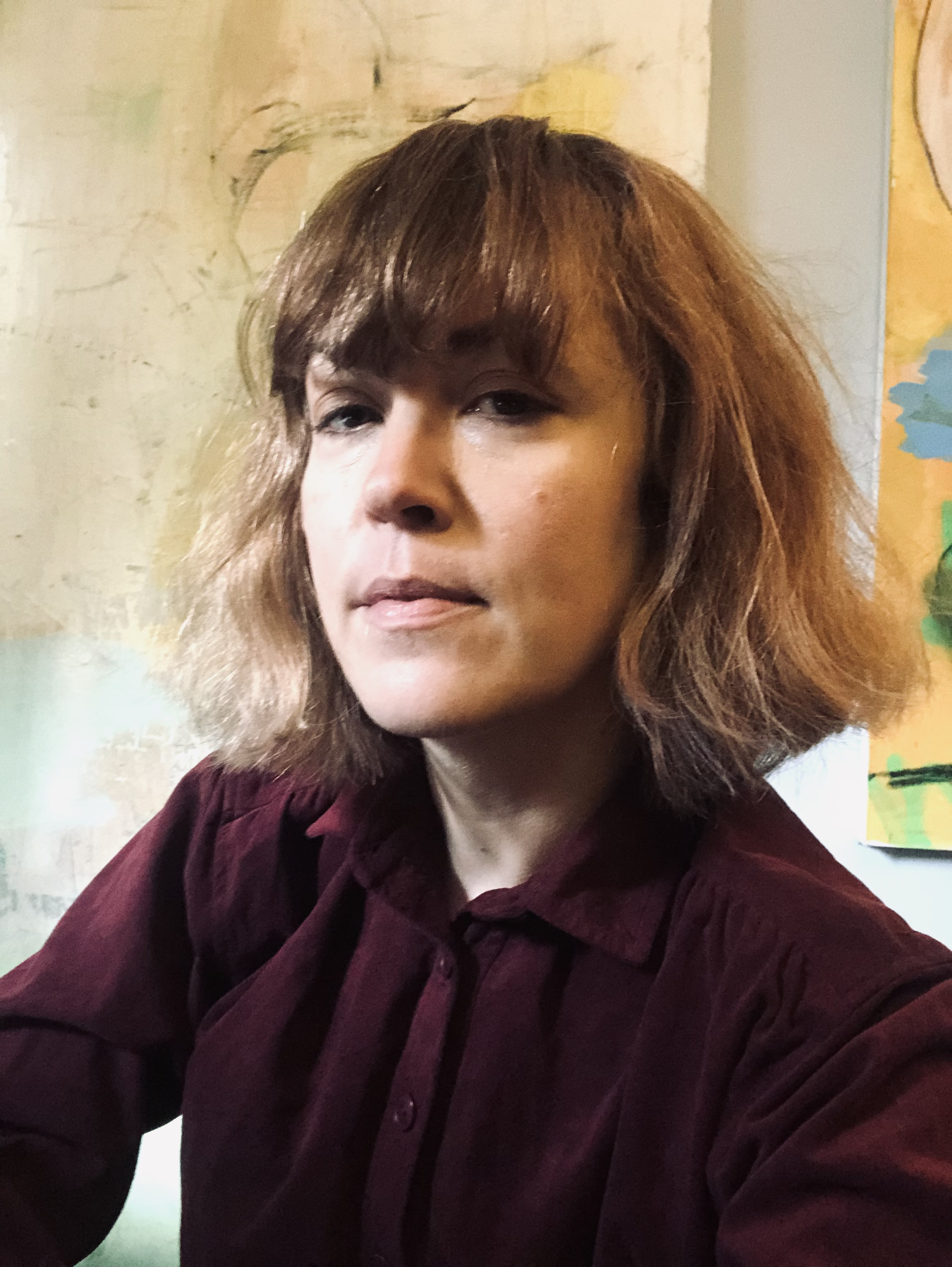
McMillan in 2021

Amber McMillan is a Canadian writer. She is the author of the poetry collection We Can't Ever Do This Again (2015), the memoir The Woods: A Year on Protection Island (2016), the short story collection The Running Trees (2021), and the poetry collection This Is a Stickup (2022).

McMillan's short story collection The Running Trees was shortlisted for the Alistair MacLeod Prize for Short Fiction in 2022. In 2017, her poem "The Other Side of an Hour" was shortlisted for the Montreal International Poetry Prize.

== Publications ==
- We Can't ever Do This Again. Wolsak & Wynn. 2015.
- The Woods: A Year on Protection Island. Nightwood Editions. 2016.
- The Running Trees. Goose Lane Editions. 2021.
- This Is a Stickup. Wolsak & Wynn. 2022.
