= Sue Sinclair =

Canadian poet

Sue Sinclair is a Canadian poet. She was raised in St. John's, Newfoundland and Labrador, and studied at Mount Allison University in Sackville, New Brunswick, graduated in 1994 and then continued her education at the University of New Brunswick. She then went on to complete an MA & PhD in Philosophy at the University of Toronto. Sinclair's first collection of poetry, Secrets of Weather and Hope (2001), was a finalist for the 2002 Gerald Lampert Award. Mortal Arguments (2003) was a finalist for the Atlantic Poetry Prize. Her third collection, The Drunken Lovely Bird, won the International Independent Publisher's Award for Poetry. Breaker was a finalist for the Pat Lowther Award and the Atlantic Poetry Prize, and Heaven's Thieves won the Pat Lowther Award.

She currently teaches in the English department at the University of New Brunswick in Fredericton.

She has been the editor of The Fiddlehead since the summer of 2018.

== Bibliography ==
- Secrets of Weather and Hope (Brick Books, 2001)
- Mortal Arguments (Brick Books, 2003)
- The Drunken Lovely Bird (Goose Lane Editions, 2005)
- Breaker (Brick Books, 2008)
- Heaven's Thieves (Brick Books, 2016)
- Almost Beauty: New and Selected Poems (Goose Lane Editions, 2022)
