= Karen Dahl =

Canadian artist

- Born: 1955 (age 70–71); Winnipeg, Manitoba, Canada
- Education: University of Regina (1978)
- Elected: Royal Canadian Academy of Arts (2007)

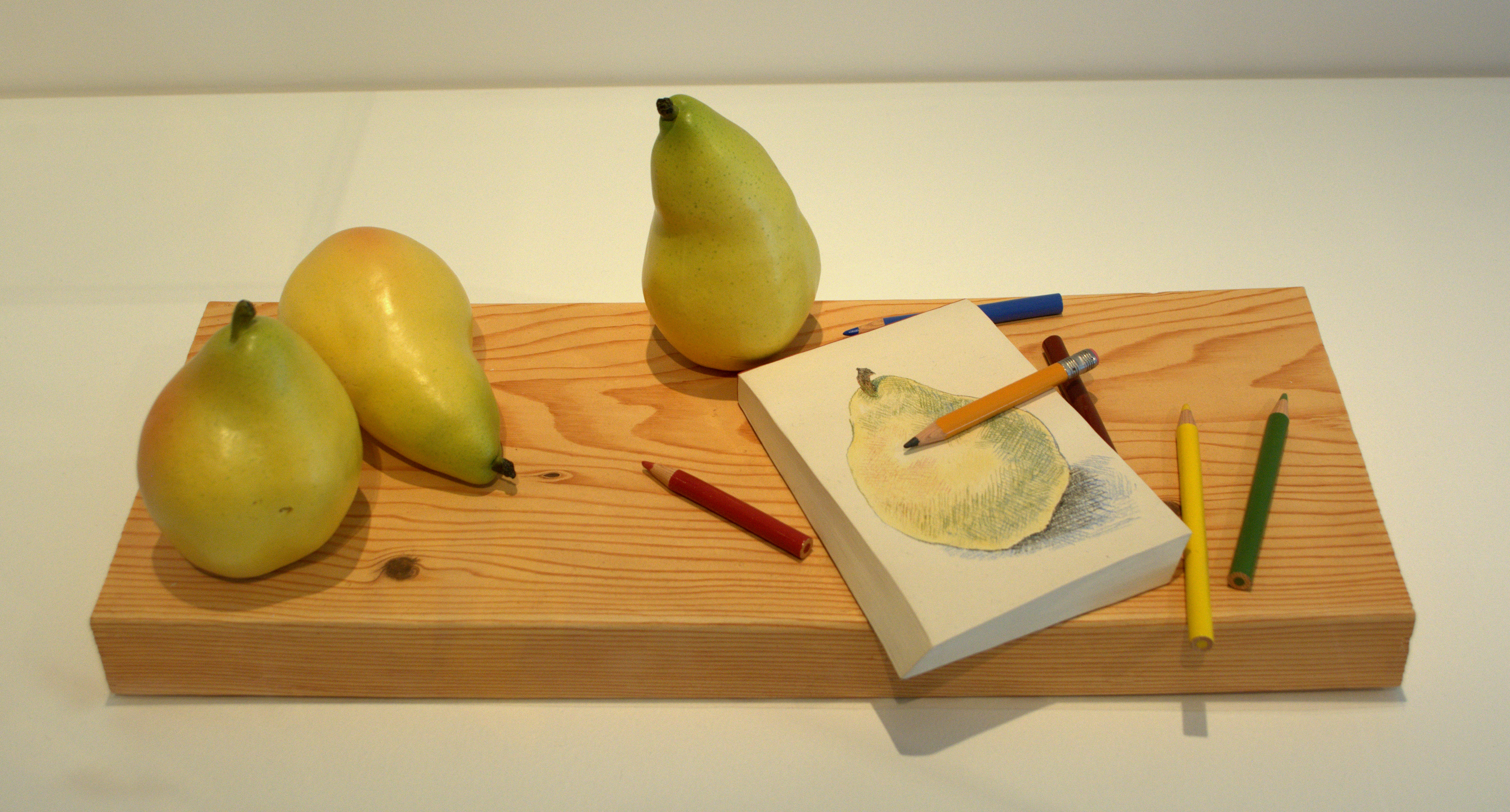
A Trio of Pears (1998-2001) by Karen Dahl

Karen Dahl RCA (born 1955) is a Canadian ceramics artist.

== Career ==
Born in Winnipeg, Dahl attended the University of Regina, graduating in 1978. She was inducted into the Royal Canadian Academy of Arts in 2007, recognizing "her knack of turning mundane objects into nostalgic or beautiful works of art". Dahl produces highly realistic ceramic imitations of books, fruits, tools and toys in a context that is destabilizing and creates a hyper-reality. Her work was exhibited at Expo 2000 in Hanover, Germany.
