= Patrick Warner =

Irish-Canadian writer

Patrick Warner is an Irish-Canadian author residing in St. John's, Newfoundland. He writes both novels and poetry. Warner has won several awards for his works, including the Newfoundland and Labrador Arts and Letters Award, the Newfoundland Book Award, the Percy Janes First Novel Award, and the Independent Publisher Regional Fiction Award.

== Life ==
Warner emigrated from County Mayo, Ireland to Newfoundland in 1980. He attended the Memorial University of Newfoundland for his undergraduate degree, earning a Bachelor's in English and Anthropology. He received a Masters in Library and Information Sciences from the University of Western Ontario. He works at the Queen Elizabeth II Library at the Memorial University of Newfoundland as a special collections librarian.

== Works ==
- All Manner of Misunderstanding (2001)
- There, There (2005)
- Mole (2009)
- Double Talk (2011)
- Perfection (2012)
- One Hit Wonders (2015)
- Octopus (2016)
- My Camino (2019)

== Awards ==
- 2002 Newfoundland and Labrador Arts and Letters Award for "Capelin"
- 2004 Newfoundland and Labrador Arts and Letters Award for "Tortoise at Toronto Zoo"
- 2007 Newfoundland Book Award for There, There
- 2011 Newfoundland Book Award for Mole
- Percy Janes First Novel Award for Double Talk
- 2012 Silver Medal for Best Regional Fiction (Canada-East) for Double Talk
- 2016 Gold Medal for Canada East Fiction for One Hit Wonders
- 2017 Newfoundland Book Award for Octopus
