= George Murray (poet) =

Canadian poet (born 1971)

George Murray (born 1971) is a Canadian poet and the former poet laureate of St. John's, Newfoundland and Labrador.

== Career ==
His poems and aphorisms have appeared in magazines and journals such as Granta, Hotel Amerika, The Iowa Review, London Magazine, New American Writing, New Welsh Review, and The Walrus. Murray was the editor of the literary blog Bookninja.com, a contributing editor at Maisonneuve magazine, and a contributing editor at several literary magazines and journals, and poetry editor at The Literary Review of Canada. After several years abroad in rural Italy and New York City, in 2005 he returned to Canada. He now lives in St. John's.

Murray's 2007 book, The Rush to Here, a sequence of 57 sonnets, reworks a number of traditional forms (Petrarchan, Spenserian, Shakesperean sonnets) into a new rhyme scheme that employs what the poet refers to as "thought-rhyme", conceptual and semantic pairings that work on the level of synonym, antonym and homonym to create intertextual meaning, as opposed to the sound bonding of traditional aural rhyme.

Murray's 2010 book of aphorisms, Glimpse, was a Canadian bestseller.

His 2012 book, Whiteout, contained a poem titled Song For Memory, first published in The New Welsh Review, that was adapted by the band The Once for their 2011 album Row Upon Row of the People They Know (a phrase taken from the poem).

In 2014, Murray founded the online poetry journal NewPoetry, a site that ran until 2018.

In 2020, Murray founded Walk the Line and Front of the Line, an online poetry school and community dedicated to teaching poetry as a learnable skill rather than as an academic pursuit.

== Bibliography ==
- Carousel. Toronto: Exile, 2000. ISBN 1-55096-524-7
- The Cottage Builder's Letter. Toronto: McClelland & Stewart, 2001. ISBN 0-7710-6672-4
- The Hunter. Toronto: McClelland & Stewart, 2003. ISBN 0-7710-6675-9
- A Set of Deadly Negotiations. Victoria: Frog Hollow Press, 2006. ISBN 0-9732776-9-6
- The Rush to Here. Vancouver: Nightwood Editions, 2007. ISBN 0-88971-229-8
- Glimpse: Selected Aphorisms. Toronto: ECW Press, 2010. ISBN 1-55022-981-8
- Whiteout. Toronto: ECW Press, 2012. ISBN 1-77041-087-2
- Diversion. Toronto: ECW Press, 2015. ISBN 1-7704-1248-4
- QUICK: Aphorisms. Toronto: ECW Press, 2017. ISBN 1-7704-1381-2
- Problematica: New and Selected Poems, 1995 - 2020. Toronto: ECW Press, 2021. ISBN 1-7704-1533-5
