= Nancy Telfer =

Canadian musician

Nancy Telfer (born May 8, 1950) is a Canadian choral conductor, music educator and composer.

== Biography ==
Nancy Ellen Telfer was born in Brampton, Ontario. She began piano lessons at age six and later played French horn in bands, orchestras and chamber ensembles. She graduated from the University of Western Ontario and worked as a music and drama teacher in the public schools. In 1977 she continued her studies at the University of Western Ontario under Jack Behrens, Kenneth Bray, Peter Paul Koprowski, and Gerhard Wuensch. She graduated from the University of Western Ontario with a bachelor's in music in 1979 and began composing.

== Works ==
Telfer has composed more than three hundred works for orchestra and solo instruments, with concentration in choral ensembles and solo voice. She is well known for her work for CNCM (Canadian National Conservatory of Music) and RCM (The Royal Conservatory of Music), contributing many pieces to their graded piano repertoire. Selected works include:

- Trampoline (Northern Lights by CNCM)
- Dancing In The Garden (Northern Lights by CNCM)
- Sun and Rain (Northern Lights by CNCM)
- Spring Break (Northern Lights by CNCM)
- Delivering Newspapers (Northern Lights by CNCM)
- Chili Pepper Dance (Northern Lights by CNCM)
- The King Tiger (Northern Lights by CNCM)
- Follow the Leader (Northern Lights by CNCM)
- Skunk Meets Dog (Northern Lights by CNCM)
- Two Fleas Climb Over a Dog (Northern Lights by CNCM)
- Jumping in Puddles (Northern Lights by CNCM)
- I'm Not Scared (Frederick Harris)
- Sea Life (Kjos)
- Wild and Free (Kjos)
- Garden Creatures (Kjos)
- Popcorn (Northern Lights by CNCM)
- Black Rhino (Northern Lights by CNCM)
- Giant Panda (Northern Lights by CNCM)
- The Giraffe (Northern Lights by CNCM)
- The Monkey (Northern Lights by CNCM)
- The Hippo (Northern Lights by CNCM)
- I Can Do It Better (Northern Lights by CNCM)
- Lemonade Through a Straw (Northern Lights by CNCM)
- Glass Necklace (Northern Lights by CNCM)
- Emerald Hummingbird (Northern Lights by CNCM)
- I've Got the Bounces (Northern Lights by CNCM)
- Bike Ride (Northern Lights by CNCM)
- Going For a Spin (Northern Lights by CNCM)
- My Favourite Things (Northern Lights by CNCM)
- When Green Leaves Dance (Northern Lights by CNCM)
- Garden Prelude (Northern Lights by CNCM)
- Crystal Castle (Northern Lights by CNCM)
- Dancing Through the Night (Northern Lights by CNCM)
- Texting Into the Flow of Life (Northern Lights by CNCM)
- Dance Of the Jellyfish (Northern Lights by CNCM)
- Eensy Weensy Spider (Northern Lights by CNCM)
- When Royalty Ruled (Northern Lights by CNCM)
- Macaw (Northern Lights by CNCM)
- Jaguar (Northern Lights by CNCM)

=== Texts ===
Telfer is the author of numerous articles on music and texts including:

- Sightsinging: A Creative Step-by-Step Approach (San Diego, Cal 1991)
- Successful Sight-Singing, Book 2 1993, Kjos
- Successful Warmups, Book 1 1995, Kjos
- Successful Warmups, Book 2 1996, Kjos
- Singing in Tune 2000, Kjos
- Singing High Pitches with Ease 2003, Kjos
