= Anne Simpson =

Canadian poet, novelist, artist and essayist

- Born: 1956 (age 69–70)
- Education: Queen's University at Kingston (B.A., M.A.); OCAD University
- Writing career
- Notable awards: Journey Prize (1997)

Anne Simpson (born 1956) is a Canadian poet, novelist, artist and essayist. She was a recipient of the Griffin Poetry Prize.

== Biography ==
Simpson received her Bachelor of Arts and Master of Arts degrees from Queen's University, and graduated in Fine Arts from OCAD University (formerly the Ontario College of Art). Subsequently, she worked as a CUSO volunteer English teacher for two years in Nigeria.

Simpson has been the writer-in-residence at a number of institutions, including the University of New Brunswick, the Medical Humanities Program at Dalhousie University (2004), the Saskatoon Public Library, the University of Prince Edward Island, Dalhousie University (2011), and Memorial University. She has been a faculty member at Sage Hill Writing Experience and the Banff Centre.

She is an adjunct professor at St. Francis Xavier University, where she established the Writing Centre.

Simpson lives in Antigonish, Nova Scotia.

== Books ==
Simpson was the co-winner of the 1997 Journey Prize, awarded for her short story Dreaming Snow. Her second collection of poetry, Loop (McClelland & Stewart, 2003), was the winner of the 2004 Canadian Griffin Poetry Prize. Loop contains many poems composed in sequences, including, notably, a poetic demonstration of a Möbius strip.

Her other poetry collections include Light Falls Through You (McClelland & Stewart, 2000), winner of the Gerald Lampert Award and the Atlantic Poetry Prize, Quick (McClelland & Stewart, 2007), winner of the Pat Lowther Award, and Is (McClelland & Stewart, 2011) in which Simpson 'negotiates an ever-changing path between language and structure'.

Simpson has written three novels: Speechless (Freehand, 2020), Canterbury Beach (Penguin, 2001) and Falling (McClelland & Stewart, 2008), which was a Canadian bestseller and winner of the Dartmouth Fiction Award. It was long-listed for the International Dublin Literary Award.

She has also written a book of essays on poetics, The Marram Grass: Poetry and Otherness (Gaspereau, 2009).

== Publications ==
Poetry

- Light Falls Through You – 2000 (winner of the Gerald Lampert Award and the Atlantic Poetry Prize) ISBN 0-7710-8077-8
- Loop – 2003 (shortlisted for the 2003 Governor General's Award, winner of the 2004 Canadian Griffin Poetry Prize) ISBN 0-7710-8075-1
- Quick – 2007 ISBN 0-7710-8091-3 (winner of the 2008 Pat Lowther Award)
- Is – 2011 ISBN 978-0-7710-8051-7

Novels

- Canterbury Beach – 2001 (shortlisted for the Thomas Head Raddall Award) ISBN 0-670-89484-2
- Falling – 2008 ISBN 978-0-7710-8090-6
- Speechless – 2020 ISBN 978-1-988298-62-7

Essays

- A Ragged Pen: Essays on Poetry & Memory – 2006 Gaspereau Press ISBN 978-1-55447-030-3
- The Marram Grass: Poetry & Otherness – 2009 Gaspereau Press ISBN 978-1-55447-071-6
- Experiments in Distant Influence – 2020 Gaspereau Press ISBN 9781554472017
