= Queen's Diamond Jubilee Medal =

Queen's Diamond Jubilee Medal may refer to:

- Queen Victoria Diamond Jubilee Medal (1897)
- Queen Elizabeth II Diamond Jubilee Medal (2012)
