= Mrs. Dunster's =

Canadian bakery

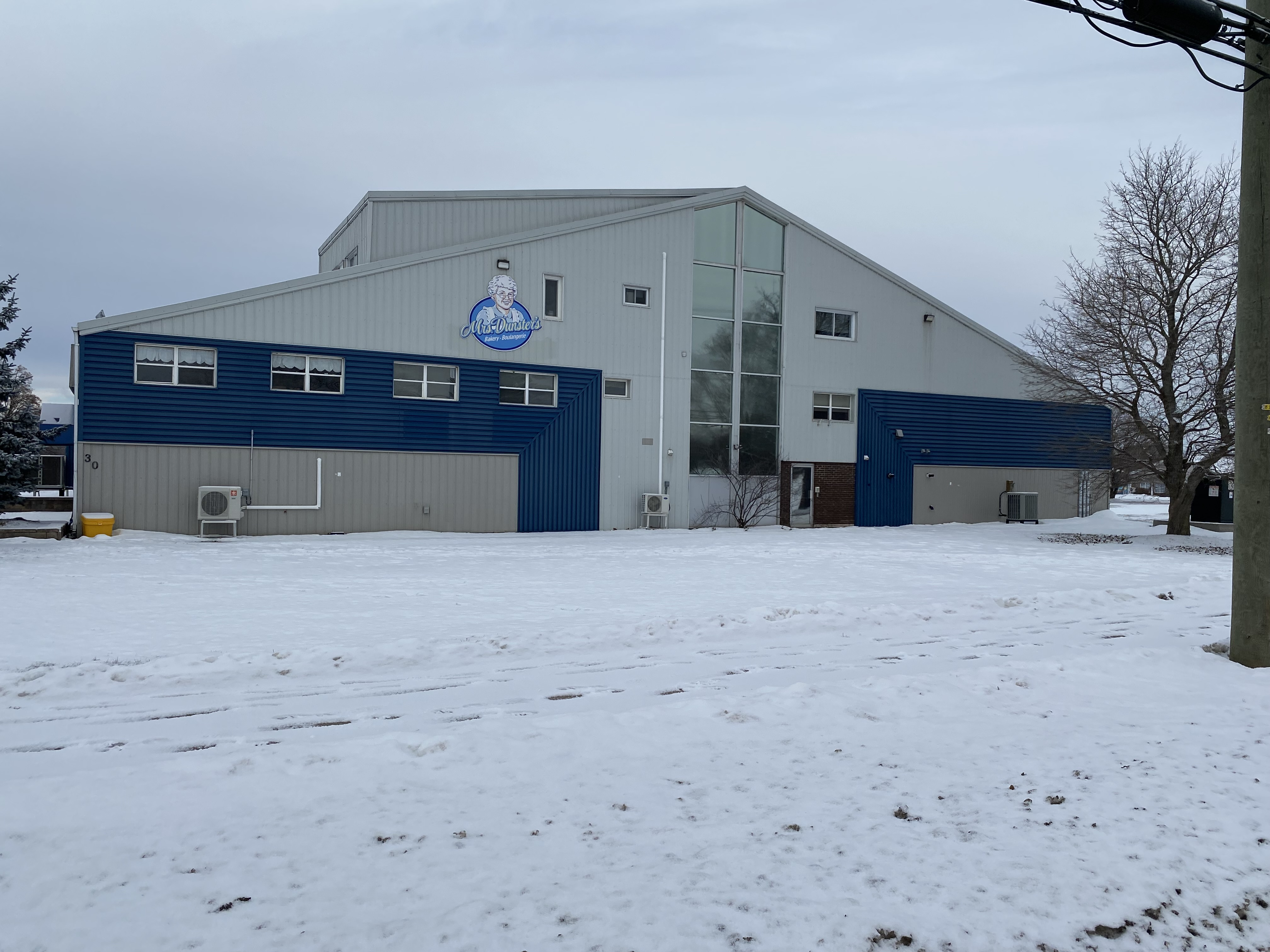
- Main facility in Sussex
- Type: Private
- Founded: 1968
- Founder: Ingrid Dunster; Harold Dunster
- Headquarters: Sussex, New Brunswick, Canada
- Products: Donuts, bread, rolls, cookies
- Number of employees: 275 (2025)
- Website: mrsdunsters.com

Mrs. Dunster's, also known as Mrs. Dunster's Bakery and Mrs. Dunster's Donuts, is a Canadian bakery headquartered in Sussex, New Brunswick.

== History ==
Mrs. Dunster's was founded in Fredericton in 1968, by Ingrid Lillian Dunster, a Finnish-born baker, with her husband Harold Dunster. They produced homemade-style donuts and distributed to retailers in the province and in Maine. In 1996, Dunster and her husband retired and sold the company to Sussex-based Dairytown Products, and relocated operations to Sussex after building a plant there in 2000.

In 2014, Mrs. Dunster's was purchased by Blair and Rosalyn Hyslop. The latter was named Atlantic Business Magazine's CEO of the year in 2023.
