= Carole Glasser Langille =

Canadian poet

Carole Glasser Langille (born 1952) is a Canadian poet, author of four books of poetry, two collections of short stories, two children's books, and a non-fiction work.

== Life and writings ==
Originally from New York City, where she studied with the poets John Ashbery and Carolyn Forché among others, Langille later moved to Black Point, Nova Scotia.

Langille's second book of poetry, In Cannon Cave, was nominated for a Governor General's Award in 1997, and for the Atlantic Poetry Prize in 1998. Church of the Exquisite Panic: The Ophelia Poems was nominated for the Atlantic Poetry Prize in 2013.

I Am What I Am Because You Are What You Are, her second collection of short stories, was nominated for the Alistair MacLeod Award for Short Fiction. Her children's book, Where the Wind Sleeps, was the Canadian Children's Book Center Choice in 1996.

Several selections from Langille's book of poetry, Late In A Slow Time, have been adapted to music by Canadian composer Chan Ka Nin. The production, also called "Late In A Slow Time", debuted at the 2006 Sound Symposium in St. John's, Newfoundland, and is on Duo Concertante's CD Wildbird. "The Depth of This Quiet", by Canadian composer Alice Ping Yee Ho, interprets poems by Langille using a combination of Eastern and Western instruments and was performed in New York City in 2017.

She has taught at The Humber School for Writing Summer Program, Maritime Writer's Workshop, the Community of Writers in Tatamagouche, and at Women's Words the University of Alberta. She has taught creative writing at Mount Saint Vincent University, writing for the arts at the Nova Scotia College of Art and Design, and currently teaches poetry at Dalhousie University.

She has given poetry readings in Athens; Delhi; Prague; London, England; New York City; Kirkcudbright, Scotland; and throughout Canada. She has received Canada Council Grants for poetry, non-fiction, and fiction.

== Awards and recognition ==
- MacDowell Fellowship, 1986
- CBC Literary Awards, finalist, 1996
- Where the Wind Sleeps, Canadian Children's Book Centre Choice, 1996
- In Cannon Cave, Governor General's Award for Poetry, finalist, 1997; Atlantic Poetry Prize finalist, 1998
- When I Always Wanted Something, long-listed for the 2009 ReLit Award for short fiction, 2009

== Critical observations ==
"Late" in Carole Glasser Langille's new book (Late in a Slow Time) comes to mean not "too late" but "recently achieved, after long experience." Her poetry takes the always provisional knowledge derived from living and thinking, and produces the delight of fine and fresh perception - a delight constantly enacted in memorable language, sparkling and original yet direct and simple. Wise and funny, private and public, various in their tones and subjects, Langille's poems never lose their thread, they project "To eat life's brevity/the way the North wind eats winter/and grows strong."

== Selected publications ==
=== Poetry ===
- All That Glitters in Water (New Poetry Series, Baltimore, 1990)
- In Cannon Cave (Brick Books, 1997)
- Late in a Slow Time (Mansfield Press, 2003)
- Church of the Exquisite Panic: The Ophelia Poems (Pedlar Press, Toronto 2012)

=== Children ===
- Where the Wind Sleeps (Roseway Publishing, 1996)
- Interview with a Stick Collector ( Roseway Publishing, 2004)

=== Prose ===
- When I Always Wanted Something (The Mercury Press, 2008)
- I Am What I Am Because You Are What You Are (2016)

=== Anthology ===
- Blood to Remember: American Poets on Holocaust (Texas University Press, 1991)
- Vintage '92 (Sono Nis Press, 1993)
- Windhorse Reader: Choice Poems of '93 (Samurai Press, 1993)
- Words Out There: Women Poets in Atlantic Canada (Roseway 1999)
- Coastlines: The Poetry of Atlantic Canada (Gooselane 2002)
- In Fine Form: The Canadian Book of Form Poetry (Raincoast Books 2005)

=== Non-fiction ===
- Doing Time: Writing Workshops in Prison, Pottersfield Press, (January 2020)
