= The Gertrudes =

Canadian indie folk band

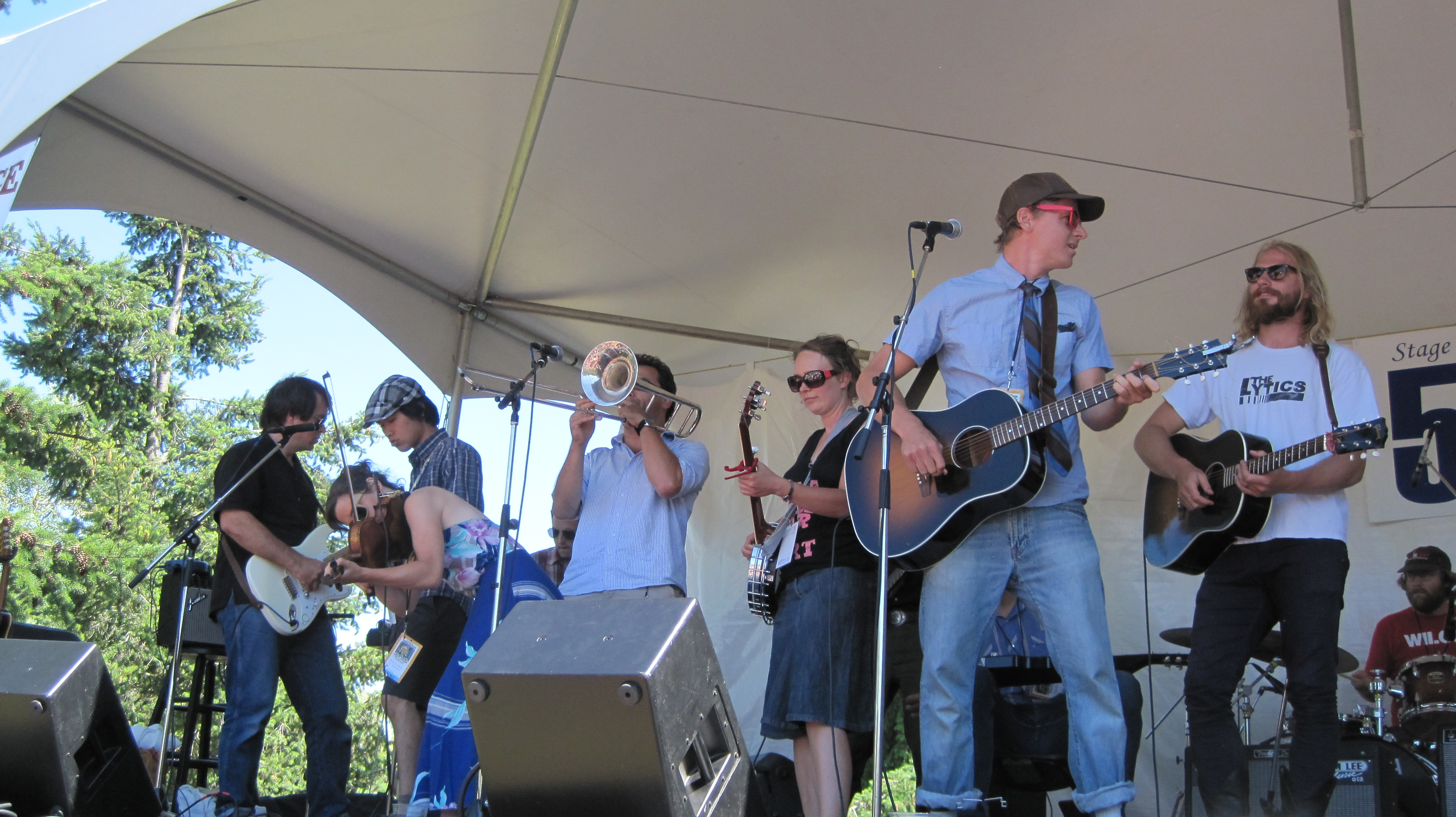
- The Gertrudes at the Vancouver Folk Music Festival in 2010

Background information
- Origin: Kingston, Ontario
- Genre: Indie folk
- Years active: 2008–present
- Labels: Apple Crisp Records, Wolfe Island Records
- Members: Greg Tilson, Annie Clifford, Jason Erb, Matt Rogalsky, Josh Lyon, Pete Bowers, Jason Mercer, Paul Clifford, Mariah (Mo) Horner
- Website: thegertrudes.com

The Gertrudes are a Canadian indie folk band from Kingston, Ontario, founded in 2008. From 2009-2012 they found significant placement on campus music charts, toured Canada coast to coast, and reached number 1 on the CBC R3-30 charts. From 2013 to 2020, they released and performed very occasionally, in connection with community issues. In 2020 during the COVID-19 pandemic, a new phase of writing and recording began, resulting in the albums Emergency To Emergency in 2021 and Just to Please You in 2023.

== History ==
The Gertrudes were formed in Kingston, Ontario in 2008. The band's name was a reference to a founding member's grandmother, who the family believes to be reincarnated in his sister of the same name. Musicians performing with the band varied from one show to the next, but core members included Greg Tilson (guitar, vocals), Annie Clifford (banjo, vocals), Lucas Huang (ukulele, percussion), Jason Erb (piano), Matt Rogalsky (guitar, mandolin), Josh Lyon (trumpet, piano, accordion), Pete Bowers (percussion), Chris Trimmer (theremin), and Pim van Geffen (trombone), with Amanda Balsys (violin, vocals) joining in time for their first full-length release, Dawn Time Riot in 2010. PS I Love You were guest musicians on one track of Dawn Time Riot. Exclaim! called the album "a meticulously crafted spectrum of modern folk sound".

Their single "All the Dollar Bills Sing Hallelujah" debuted at the top of the CBC Radio 3 R3-30 chart in the summer of 2013. They also placed multiple albums on the !earshot campus and community music charts. In 2012 they played during the finale of the Vancouver Folk Music Festival alongside the Tao Rodriguez-Seeger Band.

After their early years of regularly performing and recording, the band occasionally reassembled between 2013 and 2020 to contribute to community and activist projects, including providing the score for a 2014 documentary about the closure of prison farms across Canada, releasing a song critical of first Prime Minister John A. Macdonald's racist and expansionist policies in counterpoint to celebrations on his 200th birthday in 2015, and in 2016 releasing a song and music video to protest a plan to extend a road through Douglas Fluhrer Park in Kingston.

During the global pandemic beginning in 2020, The Gertrudes began a new intensive phase of songwriting and recording, with recording sessions held in band members' gardens and homes. After several singles, including "Parham", a song with proceeds going to the Canadian Mental Health Association commemorating a shooting and arson that occurred in Parham, Ontario, the full album was released on November 26, 2021 on Wolfe Island Records.

In 2023 they released their fifth album Just to Please You and in 2025 they released City Noise, both on Wolfe Island Records.

== Discography ==
=== Singles and EPs ===
- This Be Our EP (self-released, 2008) EP
- Hard Water (Apple Crisp Records, 2009) EP
- Emergency to Emergency (2020) Single
- The Other Side (2020) Single
- Parham (2021) Single
- New Carolina (2021) Single

=== Studio albums ===
- Dawn Time Riot (Apple Crisp Records, 2010)
- Till the Morning Shows Her Face to Me (Apple Crisp Records, 2011)
- Neighbourhood (Apple Crisp Records, 2013)
- Emergency To Emergency (Wolfe Island Records, 2021)
- Just to Please You (Wolfe Island Records, 2023)
- City Noise (Wolfe Island Records, 2025)

== See also ==
- Music of Canada
- List of Canadian musicians
- List of bands from Canada
- Category:Canadian musical groups
