= Alden Nowlan =

Canadian poet, novelist, and playwright

- Born: Alden Albert Nowlan; January 25, 1933; Stanley, Nova Scotia, Canada
- Died: June 27, 1983 (aged 50); Fredericton, New Brunswick, Canada
- Resting place: Forest Hill Cemetery, Fredericton
- Occupations: Journalist, poet, novelist, playwright, author
- Spouse: Claudine Orser (m. 1963)
- Children: John (adopted)
- Writing career
- Language: English
- Notable awards: Governor General's Award, Guggenheim Fellowship

Alden Albert Nowlan (/ˈnoʊlən/; January 25, 1933 – June 27, 1983) was a Canadian poet, novelist, and playwright.

== History ==
Alden Nowlan was born into rural poverty in Stanley, Nova Scotia, adjacent to Mosherville, and close to the small town of Windsor, Nova Scotia, along a stretch of dirt road that he would later refer to as Desolation Creek. His father, Freeman Lawrence Nowlan, worked sporadically as a manual labourer.

His mother, Grace Reese, was only 14 years of age when Nowlan was born, and she soon left the family, leaving Alden and her younger daughter Harriet to the care of their paternal grandmother. The family discouraged education as a waste of time, and Nowlan left school after only four grades. At the age of 14, he went to work in the village sawmill. At the age of 16, he discovered the new library in Windsor. Often on weekends he would travel eighteen miles to the library to get books, which broadened his already keen reading. "I wrote (as I read) in secret." Nowlan remembered. "My father would as soon have seen me wear lipstick."

== Career and later life ==
At 19, Nowlan's artfully embroidered résumé landed him a job with Observer, a newspaper in Hartland, New Brunswick. While working at the Observer, Nowlan began writing books of poetry, the first of which was published by Fredericton's Fiddlehead Poetry Books.

Nowlan eventually settled permanently in New Brunswick. In 1963, he married Claudine Orser, a typesetter on his former paper, and moved to Saint John with her and her son, John, whom he adopted. He became the night editor for the Saint John Telegraph Journal and continued to write poetry. In 1966, Nowlan was diagnosed with throat cancer. After three surgeries and a subsequent radiation treatment, his health began to improve. He wrote poems about his brush with death. In 1967, he was awarded a Guggenheim Fellowship, and his collection Bread, Wine and Salt was awarded the Governor General's Award for Poetry. Soon afterward, the University of New Brunswick in Fredericton offered him the position of Writer-in-Residence. He remained in the position until his death on June 27, 1983, after collapsing at his home with severe emphysema.

== Death ==
Alden Nowlan suffered either a heart attack or a seizure at his Fredericton home on June 11, 1983. At the time, he was writer-in-residence at the University of New Brunswick. He fell into a coma and was held at Dr. Everett Chalmers Regional Hospital until his death on June 27, 1983.

== Awards and recognition ==
Nowlan's most notable literary achievements include the Governor General's Award for Bread, Wine and Salt (1967) and a Guggenheim Fellowship. He was writer-in-residence at the University of New Brunswick in Fredericton from 1968 until his death in 1983. In New Brunswick, the Alden Nowlan Award for Excellence in English-language Literary Arts is named in his honour.

Nowlan is one of Canada's most popular 20th-century poets, and his appearance in the anthology Staying Alive (2002) has helped to spread his popularity beyond Canada.

In the 1970s, Nowlan met and became close friends with theatre director Walter Learning. The two collaborated on a number of plays, including A Gift to Last, Frankenstein, The Dollar Woman, and The Incredible Murder of Cardinal Tosca.

Nowlan's Fredericton home is now the residence of the Graduate Student Association at the University of New Brunswick. Dubbed "Windsor Castle" by Nowlan after its location on Windsor Street, the simple building is now officially called the Alden Nowlan House.

Nowlan is buried in the Poets' Corner of the Forest Hill cemetery in Fredericton, New Brunswick.

== Bibliography ==
=== Poetry ===
- A Darkness in the Earth. Eureka, California: Hearse, 1958.
- The Rose and the Puritan. Fredericton, N.B.: University of New Brunswick, 1958.
- Wind in a Rocky Country. Toronto: Emblem, 1960.
- Under the Ice. Toronto: Ryerson, 1961.
- Five New Brunswick Poets. Fredericton, N.B.: Fiddlehead Poetry Books, 1962. (with Elizabeth Brewster, Fred Cogswell, Robert Gibbs and Kay Smith)
- The Things Which Are. Toronto: Contact, 1962.
- Bread, Wine and Salt. Toronto: Clarke, Irwin, 1967.
- A Black Plastic Button and a Yellow Yoyo, handmade limited edition folio of 20 copies, printed and illustrated by Charles Pachter, Toronto 1968
- The Mysterious Naked Man. Toronto: Clarke, Irwin, 1969.
- Playing the Jesus Game: Selected Poems. Trumansburg, N.Y.: New/Books, 1970.
- Between Tears and Laughter. Toronto: Clarke, Irwin, 1971.
- I'm a Stranger Here Myself. Toronto: Clarke, Irwin, 1974.
- Shaped by This Land. Fredericton: Brunswick, 1974.
- Smoked Glass. Toronto: Clarke, Irwin, 1977.
- I Might Not Tell Everybody This. Toronto: Clarke, Irwin, 1982.
- Early Poems. Fredericton, N.B.: Fiddlehead Poetry Books, 1983.
- An Exchange of Gifts: Poems New and Selected. Toronto: Irwin, 1985.
- What Happened When He Went to the Store for Bread. Minneapolis: Nineties Press, 1993.
- The Best of Alden Nowlan. Hantsport, N.S.: Lancelot, 1993.
- Alden Nowlan: Selected Poems. Toronto: House of Anansi, 1996.
- Between Tears and Laughter Tarset, Northumberland, U.K.: Bloodaxe, 2004. ISBN 1-85224-629-4
- Collected Poems Fredericton, N. B.: Goose Lane, 2017.

=== Fiction ===
- Miracle at Indian River. Clarke, Irwin, Toronto 1968
- Various Persons Named Kevin O'Brien. Clarke, Irwin, Toronto 1973
- The year of the revolution, CBC radio anthology, Robert Weaver: Small wonders. New stories by 12 distinguished Canadian authors. CBC, Toronto 1982, pp 85 – 96
- Will Ye Let the Mummers In. Irwin, Toronto 1984
- The Wanton Troopers. Goose Lane, Fredericton 1988

=== Drama ===
- Frankenstein: The Man Who Became God - Clarke, Irwin, Toronto 1974 (with Walter Learning)
- The Dollar Woman – Playwrights Co-op, Toronto 1981 (with Walter Learning)
- The Incredible Murder of Cardinal Tosca – Dramatic Publishing, 1978 (with Walter Learning)
- A Gift to Last (with Walter Learning) from the teleplay by Gordon Pinsent
- Gardens of the Wind – (CBC radio broadcast) Saskatoon: Thistledown, 1982.

=== Non-fiction ===
- Campobello: The Outer Island. Toronto: Clarke, Irwin, 1975.
- Double Exposure. Fredericton, N.B.: Brunswick Press, 1978.
- Nine Micmac Legends. Hantsport, N.S.: Lancelot, 1983.
- White Madness. Ottawa: Oberon, 1996.
- Road Dancers. Ottawa: Oberon, 1999.

=== Anthologies ===
- 15 Canadian Poets X3, ed. Gary Geddes (Oxford University Press, 2001)
- Coastlines: The Poetry of Atlantic Canada, ed. Anne Compton, Laurence Hutchman, Ross Leckie and Robin McGrath (Goose Lane Editions, 2002)

=== Recordings ===
- Alden Nowlan's Maritimes. Canadian Broadcasting Corporation, 1972.

== See also ==
- Canadian literature
- Canadian poetry
- List of Canadian poets
