= Robin McGrath =

Canadian writer

Robin McGrath (born March 29, 1949) is a Canadian writer from St. John's, Newfoundland and Labrador.

== Early career ==
The daughter of former Newfoundland politician James McGrath, she completed a Ph.D. in English literature at the University of Western Ontario, and later taught at the University of Alberta. During her academic career, she also wrote for the London Free Press and the Edmonton Journal, and published Canadian Inuit Literature: The Development of a Tradition, one of the first-ever academic studies of Inuit oral literary traditions. She left academia and returned to St. John's in 1993 to pursue creative writing.

== Writing career ==
She published the short fiction collection Trouble and Desire in 1996, which was a Newfoundland and Labrador Book Award nominee in 1998.

Escaped Domestics, her first poetry collection, followed in 1998. The book was a J. M. Abraham Poetry Award nominee, and won a Canadian Jewish Book Award for poetry in 1999.

In 1999, she published the young adult novel Hoist Your Sails and Run. The book was a nominee for the Ann Connor Brimer Award in 2001. In 2002, the Resource Centre for the Arts staged her theatrical play A Mountain of Shoes, about a young Holocaust survivor who settles in Newfoundland, and she published the novel Donovan's Station. The novel was a Commonwealth Writers Prize nominee for Canada and the Caribbean in 2003.

In 2005, she published the poetry collection Covenant of Salt, for which she received another J.M. Abraham Poetry Award nomination in 2006.

Her 2009 novel The Winterhouse won a Canadian Jewish Book Award for fiction in 2010.

She has also published the novels Gone to the Ice (2003), and Livyers World (2007) and the non-fiction books Salt Fish and Shmattes: The History of the Jews in Newfoundland and Labrador from 1770 (2006), a history of the Jewish community in Newfoundland and Labrador, and Life on the Mista Shipu: Dispatches from Labrador (2018).
