= Anne Compton =

Canadian poet, critic, and anthologist

- Born: 1947 (age 78–79); Bangor. Prince Edward Island, Canada
- Education: University of Prince Edward Island (BA); York University (MA); University of New Brunswick (Ph.D.)
- Writing career
- Notable awards: Atlantic Poetry Prize (2003, 2006); Governor General's Award for English-language poetry (2005)

Anne Compton (born 1947) is a Canadian poet, critic, and anthologist.

== Biography ==
Compton was born and raised in the farming community of Bangor, Prince Edward Island. She received her Bachelor of Arts from the University of Prince Edward Island, her Masters from York University and her PhD from the University of New Brunswick. Until retiring to write full-time in 2012, Dr. Compton taught literature and creative writing for the Department of Humanities and Languages at the University of New Brunswick Saint John, where she also served as Writer-in-Residence and, for many years, the Director of the Lorenzo Reading Series. She serves on the New Brunswick Arts Board.

== Awards and honours ==
In 2007, Compton was a featured writer at the Maritime Writers' Workshop & Literary Festival in Fredericton, New Brunswick.

In 2008, she received the Alden Nowlan Award for excellence in English language literary arts, presented by the New Brunswick Arts Board, as well as the National Magazine Award in Poetry. The same year, she received the following awards from the University of New Brunswick, Saint John: Excellence in Teaching Award for the Department of Humanities and Languages and Excellence in Teaching Award for the Faculty of Arts.

In 2012, Compton won the Queen Elizabeth II Diamond Jubilee Medal.

In 2014, she won the Lieutenant-Governor's Award for High Achievement in the Arts.

Awards for Compton's writing
Year	Title	Award	Result	Ref.
2002	Opening the Island	Margaret and John Savage First Book Award	Shortlist	
2003	Opening the Island	Atlantic Poetry Prize	Winner	
2005	Processional	Governor General's Award for English-language poetry	Winner	
2006	Processional	Atlantic Poetry Prize	Winner	
2006	Processional	Pat Lowther Prize	Shortlist	
2007	Asking Questions Indoors and Out	Atlantic Poetry Prize	Shortlist	

== Publications ==
=== Scholarship ===
- A.J.M. Smith: Canadian Metaphysical (1994)
- The Edge of Home: Milton Acorn from the Island (editor, 2002)
- Coastlines: The Poetry of Atlantic Canada (co-editor, 2002)
- Meetings with Maritime Poets (2006)

=== Poetry ===
- Opening the Island (2003)
- Processional (2005)
- Asking Questions Indoors and Out (2009)
- Alongside (2013)

=== Selected anthologies ===
- New Canadian Poetry (Fitzhenry and Whiteside, 2000)
- Following the Plough: Recovering the Rural (Black Moss Press, 2000)
- Landmarks: an Anthology of New Atlantic Poetry (The Acorn Press, 2001)
- Modern Canadian Poets (Carcanet, 2010)
