= Fred Cogswell =

Canadian poet

Fred Cogswell CM ONB (November 8, 1917 – June 20, 2004) was a Canadian poet from New Brunswick.

== Life and career ==
Born in East Centreville, New Brunswick he served overseas in the Canadian Army during the Second World War. A teacher at the age of sixteen, Cogswell gained a BA(Hons) and MA at the University of New Brunswick and received a PhD from Edinburgh University presenting the thesis "Concept of America in English literature of the romantic period". He later became a professor of English at the University of New Brunswick, a position he held from 1952 to 1983.

In 1958, Cogswell, along with a group of students and faculty from the University of New Brunswick founded Fiddlehead Poetry Books, now operating as Goose Lane Editions.

Fred Cogswell was made a member of the Order of Canada in 1981.

Fred Cogswell was a prolific poet, translator, editor and scholar and was dubbed "A Friend of Poets - Amis des Poètes" for his lifelong commitment to poetry and those who write it. He was the author of 33 books of his own poetry, 9 books of poetry translation and publisher of 307 books of poetry. In addition, Fred Cogswell wrote and published many learned articles and reviews. His poetry has been published in magazines, journals, anthologies and textbooks and has been translated into several languages including Chinese, Romanian, Spanish, and French.

Dr. Cogswell was a Life Member of the League of Canadian Poets, the Association of Canadian Publishers, and the Writers' Federation of New Brunswick.

The Fred Cogswell Award For Excellence In Poetry was founded in 2014 and is an annual event open to Canadian poets.

== Selected bibliography ==
- The Stunted Strong, 1954, Fiddlehead Poetry Books (republished 2004 by Goose Lane Editions, ISBN 0-86492-420-8)
- The House Without a Door, 1959, Ryerson Press
- Lost Dimension, 1960, Outposts Publications, Dulwich Village, UK
- Immortal Plowman, 1969, Fiddlehead Poetry Books
- One Hundred Poems of Modern Quebec, 1970, Fiddlehead Poetry Books (ed. & trans.)
- The House Without a Door, 1973, Fiddlehead Poetry Books ISBN 0-919197-54-X
- The Best Notes Merge, 1988, Borealis Press, ISBN 0-88887-899-0
- Black and White Tapestry, 1989, Borealis Press, ISBN 0-88887-915-6
- Watching An Eagle, 1991, Borealis Press, ISBN 0-88887-210-0
- In Praise of Old Music, 1992, Borealis Press, ISBN 0-88887-134-1
- When the Right Light Shines, 1992, Borealis Press, ISBN 0-88887-124-4
- In My Own Growing, 1993, Borealis Press, ISBN 0-88887-113-9
- As I See It, 1994, Borealis Press, ISBN 0-88887-150-3
- The Trouble With Light, 1996, Borealis Press, ISBN 0-88887-140-6
- Folds, 1997, Borealis Press, ISBN 0-88887-171-6
- A Double Question, 1999, Borealis Press, ISBN 0-88887-838-9
- With Vision Added, 2000, Borealis Press, ISBN 0-88887-845-1
- The Vision of Fred: Conversations with Fred Cogswell on the Nature and Function of Poetry (Kathleen Forsythe, ed.), 2004, Borealis Press, ISBN 0-88887-282-8

== Anthologies ==
- Coastlines: The Poetry of Atlantic Canada, ed. Anne Compton, Laurence Hutchman, Ross Leckie and Robin McGrath (Goose Lane Editions, 2002)

== Awards ==
- Bliss Carman Award for Poetry, 1945, 1947.
- Gold Medal, Philippines Republic, for Distinguished Poet, Magazine Editor, 1957.
- Member of the Order of Canada, 1981.
- L.L.D., St. Francis Xavier University, 1983.
- D.C.L., King's College, 1985.
- L.L.D., Mount Allison University, 1988.
- Alden Nowlan Award for Excellence in Literary Arts, New Brunswick Government, 1995.
- Medal for 125th Anniversary of Canada, 1997.

== See also ==
- Canadian literature
- Canadian poetry
- List of Canadian poets
- List of Canadian writers
