= The Fiddlehead =

Canadian literary magazine

- Categories: literary magazine
- Frequency: Quarterly
- Founder: Alfred Bailey
- First issue: February 1945; 81 years ago
- Company: University of New Brunswick
- Country: Canada
- Based in: Fredericton
- Language: English
- Website: thefiddlehead.ca
- ISSN: 0015-0630

The Fiddlehead is a Canadian literary magazine, published four times annually at the University of New Brunswick. It is the oldest Canadian literary magazine which is still in circulation.

== History and profile ==
The Fiddlehead was established in 1945 by Alfred Bailey as an in-house publication for the Bliss Carman Poetry Society. The first issue was published in February 1945. It was adapted as a general literary magazine in 1952. Other prominent contributors in the magazine's early years included Elizabeth Brewster, Fred Cogswell and Desmond Pacey.

The Fiddlehead's current editor is Sue Sinclair; contributing editors include Ross Leckie, Bill Gaston, Gerard Beirne, Janice Kulyk Keefer, Don McKay and Jan Zwicky. The magazine is published quarterly.

The magazine celebrated its 70th anniversary with the Winter 2015 issue.

== See also ==
- List of literary magazines
