= Matthew Stadler =

American author (born 1959)

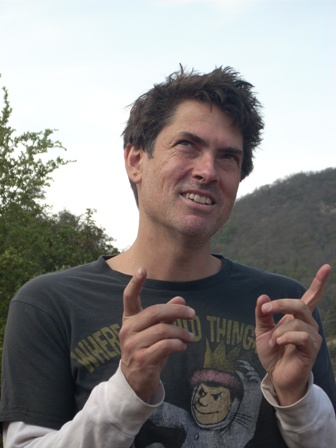
Stadler at Knecht Camp in 2008

Matthew Stadler (born 1959) is an American author who has written six novels and received several awards. Stadler has compiled four anthologies about literature, city life and public life. His essays, which have been published in magazines and museum catalogs, focus on architecture, urban planning and sprawl.

"Sprawl is the disappearance of an idea", Stadler wrote in the annotated reader Where We Live Now. "So how can we go on speaking of the city and the country, yet not remain fixed in the downward spiral of loss?" Stadler's essays and larger projects explore this question by looking for better language and new descriptions. While there is significant overlap, Stadler's work can usefully be broken down into three areas: novels; sprawl and urbanism; publishing and public space.

== Novels ==
Between 1990 and 2000, Stadler published four novels that focus on children, sexuality, and art: Landscape: Memory (1990); The Dissolution of Nicholas Dee (1993); The Sex Offender (1994); and Allan Stein (1999). These books were widely discussed and lauded as gay fiction, including the 1999 Lambda Award for Best Gay Novel, for Allan Stein. After co-founding Publication Studio in 2009, Stadler went on to use this platform to publish a so-called "cover novel," Chloe Jarren’s La Cucaracha (2011), as well as the dystopian novel Minders (2015).

Reviewing Allan Stein in the New York Times, Edmund White wrote, "What makes Allan Stein unusual is the lyric suppleness and restraint of the writing, a kind of mandarin American casualness that is peculiar to such West Coast writers as Dennis Cooper, Dodie Bellamy, Kevin Killian and Robert Gluck, a school of refined but deceptively offhand stylists. Matthew Stadler is its newest star. In Allan Stein we encounter the trademark passages of stark beauty...With it Stadler demonstrates that he is among the handful of first-rate young American novelists, one with a wide reach and a quirky, elegant pen."

== Sprawl and urbanism ==
In the early 1990s, while living in Groningen, the Netherlands, to research his novel, The Dissolution of Nicholas Dee, Stadler was invited to take part in an architectural conference at the Technical University at Delft. Through this conference and subsequent invitations to write about architecture for the Dutch journal Wiederhal, Stadler became involved in that country's discussion of urban planning and design.

At a 1993 conference in Rotterdam, called Bliss, Stadler was asked to respond to Rem Koolhaas's recently published "Manifesto for Bigness." In his talk, subsequently published as "I Think I'm Dumb," Stadler characterized the sprawl of the American West Coast as "the native home for bigness," and endorsed it as a productive, urban landscape. Many of the subsequent themes in Stadler's work on sprawl and urbanism can be found in this initial essay.

In "I Think I'm Dumb" Stadler writes that the borderless West Coast city "feels like material scattered around in space or like electronic information. The huge glass boxes downtown could easily be kicked over, like models pumped up with growth hormones, huge and brittle air. Walking down the hill from where I live to downtown is like walking over a scab. The interstate freeway…has twelve lanes and cuts right through the middle of the city. It goes from Canada to Mexico." But rather than condemning this landscape as a failure, Stadler asserts that "this place has given rise to a peculiar, dumb and lovely pattern of work that [as Rem K ponders in his manifesto] 'reconstructs the whole' and is doing something with the collective (it's hard to describe exactly what that is), plus it sheds some light on 'the real.'" (Here Stadler links sprawl to the three positive capacities that Koolhaas's manifesto ascribes to Bigness.)

Stadler's inclination to look for positive potentials in the shapeless new landscapes of sprawl matured over the next decade as he read (and published) the essays of the poet Lisa Robertson. Writing as the Office for Soft Architecture, Robertson pursued what she calls lyrical research into the new, dynamic forms of cities, especially her home (then) of Vancouver, B.C., Canada. Robertson's evocations of "this permanent transience, the buildings or shelters like tents—tents of steel, chipboard, stucco, glass, cement, paper, and various claddings—tents rising and falling in the glittering rhythm which is null rhythm, which is the flux of modern careers..." helped Stadler understand how writing can transform degraded landscapes into sites of meaning and beauty.

This insight was confirmed and persuasively theorized by German urban planner Thomas Sieverts in his book, Zwischenstadt, which came into English in 1997 as Cities Without Cities. Stadler's encounter with Sieverts's work in 2003, catalyzed the analysis of cities and sprawl that he ultimately published in the annotated reader, Where We Live Now.

Where We Live Now is a collection of urban theory, historical documents, and literature that makes three simple arguments: (1) Thomas Sieverts's description of what he calls "zwischenstadt" (literally the "in-between city") is a useful, accurate description of the built environment that has displaced the old concentric city; (2) this condition, of a densely inhabited in-between landscape, has a deep history in North America, predating the arrival of European explorers, which can be usefully articulated if we study indigenous history in the Americas as urban history; and (3), that new literature which springs from this history can help us occupy the in-between landscapes fully and well. These three arguments — advocacy for the relevance of Sieverts's analysis; an insistence that indigenous history is urban history; and a faith in the power of literature to shape an urban future — form the core of Stadler's work on urbanism and sprawl.

== Publishing and public space ==
At a 2008 lecture in Vitoria, Spain, Stadler described publication as "the creation of a public ... There is no preexisting public," he went on. "The public is created through deliberate, willful acts: the circulation of texts, discussions and gatherings in physical space, and the maintenance of a related digital commons. These construct a common space of conversation, a public space, which beckons a public into being. This publication in its fullest sense."

Stadler maintains that the public we think of when we speak of "public opinion" or "mainstream" is the manufactured product of special interests that use the publication to conjure a public that "can justify their own self-interests." He cites the example of the "public will" conjured by the US government and news media to support that country's 2003 invasion of Iraq. Publication "is always a political act," Stadler argues. It is "imperative that we publish" not only as a means to counter the influence of a hegemonic "public," but also to reclaim the space in which we imagine ourselves and our collectivity. "We feel lonely and powerless when we accept the myth of 'the mainstream public.' When we accept that fiction we relinquish our ability to form our own collectivities and draw hope from them."

A year before Stadler's first novel was released, he began to run a writing class at his kitchen table in Seattle. He met there several writers, artists, and scientists including Lee Hartwell and Frances McCue. That same year, McCue and poet Jan Wallace had founded a reading series, The Rendezvous Room Reading Series, to bridge the gap between academic writers at the University of Washington and the underground writers of The Red Sky Poetry Theatre. Stadler joined them as a co-director of the series. "One thing led to another, and before long we were organizing classes for writers and artists in a self-generating night school called The Extension Project," Stadler wrote in the introduction to an unpublished manuscript.

During this time Stadler began to publish his novels, which were placed with large New York-based publishers, Charles Scribner's Sons, Harper-Collins, and Grove Press. He also wrote for widely distributed, New York-based journals such as the New York Times, the New York Times Magazine, Spin Magazine, the Village Voice, and many others. But frustration with the narrow interests at this publication led Stadler to focus on small "start-up" journals and zines closer to home, where he was able to develop concerns and a writing style that were not in fashion with the editors he knew at the larger New York-based journals.

In 1994, he joined a fledgling weekly newspaper in Seattle, The Stranger, and became their first books editor, founding a books quarterly and bringing accomplished poets and prose writers such as Eileen Myles, Charles D'Ambrosio, Lisa Robertson, Kevin Killian, Bruce Benderson, and Stacey Levine to write for the paper. In 1996 he became the first (and only) literary editor for Nest Magazine, an idiosyncratic interiors magazine, founded and directed by Joseph Holtzman, that Stadler described as "a really beautiful zine run by a millionaire." Nest, where Stadler assigned and edited all of the texts throughout the magazine's six-year run, won the National Magazine Awards for General Excellence and for Design and was widely acclaimed as, in architect Rem Koolhaas's words, "an anti-materialistic, idealistic magazine about the hyper-specific in a world that is undergoing radical leveling, an 'interior design' magazine hostile to the cosmetic."

Many of the writers Stadler published at The Stranger and Nest had books they could not get published, so in 2001 he co-founded Clear Cut Press, a small independent press, with Rich Jensen, the former president of Sub Pop Records and co-founder of Up Records.

Clear Cut Press applied the viral, community-based marketing that Jensen had used to cultivate audiences for music at Sub Pop and Up to promote new books by the authors Stadler had been publishing at Nest and The Stranger. The press hosted festive public gatherings that blended readings with live music by friends of the press, including Phil Elverum, Jona Bechtolt (YACHT), Black Cat Orchestra, Lou Barlow, and many others. The events were meant to "cultivate a long-term conversation that makes a community of readers," Stadler said in a 2004 interview.

The books, printed in a uniform trim size and designed by Tae Won Yu, were distributed primarily by subscription. "[We] ship a book out of the warehouse if we feel confident that it will reach a reader," Stadler continued. "That means (1) shipping to those who have already paid (subscribers and online orders); (2) shipping to stores that know CCP well and will shepherd the books to readers; (3) shipping to distributors who know CCP well…" Clear Cut Press published nine books in runs of 2000 – 4000 and sold out most of its runs with a less-than-one percent return rate, virtually unheard of in commercial publishing (industry average is 45% return rate).

In April 2005, Stadler and Clear Cut author Matt Briggs organized the Unassociated Writers Conference and Dance Party as "part party, part architectural experiment, part performance, part song and dance," the conference promoted an alternative literary culture of zines, micro presses and project-based publishing."

In 2004 Clear Cut Press sponsored a dinner for its subscribers in Portland, Oregon, collaborating with a restaurant group called Ripe. The evening included live music, readings, a film, and food and drink. Stadler later asked Ripe's owners, Michael Hebb and Naomi Pomeroy, to appoint him as a "writer in residence" for Ripe. In exchange for food and drink he would write essays and program a monthly series of "presentations/symposia/bacchanals replete with food, drink, music, and general boisterousness garlanding the central pleasure of bright intellects voicing their excellent texts, winging it in conversation, and screening or presenting various textual and visual delights." The result was the back room, an ongoing series of dinners and conversations with associated commissions for new publications. As of 2008, the back room has held over 30 events (with such guests as Gore Vidal, Aaron Peck, Gregory Crewdson, Anne Focke, Mary Gaitskill, Lisa Robertson, Lawrence Rinder, and Aaron Betsky) and commissioned more than a dozen new essays, publishing eight chapbooks and one 500-page anthology, which are distributed worldwide.

Broad interest in the Clear Cut Press model and the back room events led Stadler, in 2005, to found the Using Global Media workshop, a seminar of sorts that functions as a laboratory for exploring what he calls "the ecology of publication" (that is, the combination of printed texts with public gatherings and an associated digital commons). The workshop convenes as a group of a dozen or so, periodically; and it grows by convening in distant places where new members can join, whenever circumstances allow.

The publication project called suddenly developed from conversations with the curator, Stephanie Snyder, who directed the back room and joined the Using Global Media workshop in 2006. The suddenly web site is authored by another workshop member, Sergio Pastor. Stadler chose to publish suddenly's central document, a 500-page annotated reader, Where We Live Now, with the print-on-demand site, Lulu. Suddenly distributes the book by programming public conversations in many cities around the world, so that rather than having a large reservoir of printed copies that must be stored until they are pushed out through market pipelines, suddenly cultivates conversations that then draw the books out one-by-one from the printer, like sponges drawing water.

In September 2009 he co-founded Publication Studio, a print-on-demand publisher that prints and binds books by hand in a Portland, Ore., storefront, "creating original work with artists and writers we admire, books that both respond to the conversation of the moment and can endure. We attend to the social life of the book, cultivating a public that cares and is engaged. Publication Studio is a laboratory for publication in its fullest sense — not just the production of books, but the production of a public." Among the writers and artists published by Publication Studio are Lawrence Rinder, Walter Benjamin, Ari Marcopoulos, Lisa Robertson, Thomas Sieverts, Jessica Jackson Hutchins, and Matt Briggs.

=== Publication Studio ===
Publication Studio is a publisher founded in Portland, Oregon in 2009 by Matthew Stadler and Patricia No, that "marries the common view of DIY practice with global reach" by using cheap, widely available print on demand technologies. Books are published as ordered via the company's website or in person or they can be bought in bookstores across North America, Europe, and Japan. Located in a dedicated storefront in downtown Portland Publication Studio now has twelve "sibling studios" producing original books in Berkeley, CA, Guelph, ON, Canada, Vancouver, BC, Canada, Toronto, ON, Canada, Minneapolis, MN, Los Angeles, CA, Philadelphia, PA, Portland, ME, Hudson, NY, Malmö, SE, London, UK, and Rotterdam, NL.

Publication Studio has published over 300 books (April 2016) by authors including Aaron Peck, Thomas Sieverts, Matthew Stadler, Lawrence Rinder, Travis Jeppesen, Paul G. Maziar and Walter Benjamin.

== Works ==
- Google Books Landscape: Memory (Scribner's, 1990)
- Google Books The Dissolution of Nicholas Dee (HarperCollins Publishers, 1993)
- Google Books The Sex Offender: A Novel (HarperCollins Publishers, 1995)
- Google Books Allan Stein (Grove Press, 2000)
- Chloe Jarren's La Cucaracha (Publication Studio, Jank Editions, 2011)
- Google Books Deventer (Nai, 2013)
- Minders: A Novel (Publication Studio, 2015)

Anthologies including Stadler's Work

- Men on Men 4: Best New Gay Fiction, ed. George Stambolian, Felice Picano, Andrew Holleran (Plume, 1992)
- Boys Like Us: Gay Writers Tell Their Coming Out Stories, ed. Patrick Merla (Avon Books, 1996)
- Northwest Edge: Deviant Fictions, ed. Lidia Yuknavitch, L. N. Pearson (Two Girls, 2000)
- Gay Fiction Speaks, ed. Richard Canning (Columbia University Press, 2000)
- The Rendezvous Reader: Northwest Writing ed. Novella Carpenter, Paula Gilovich, Rachel Kessler (Tenth Avenue East Publishing, 2002)
- Considering Rem Koolhaas and the Office for Metropolitan Architecture ed. Rem Koolhaas, Véronique Patteeuw, Office for Metropolitan Architecture, Staatliche Museen zu Berlin (Germany), Nederlands Architectuurinstituut, Neue Nationalgalerie (Germany), Kunsthal Rotterdam (NAi Publishers, 2003)
- Reading Seattle: The City in Prose, ed. Peter Donahue, John Trombold (University of Washington Press, 2004)
- Hear Us Out: Conversations with Gay Novelists ed. Richard Canning (Columbia University Press, 2004)
- Reading Portland: The City in Prose ed. John Trombold, Peter Donahue (University of Washington Press, 2007)

Anthologies Edited by Stadler

- The Clear Cut Future (Clear Cut Press, 2003)
- The Back Room (Clear Cut Press, 2007)
- Where We Live Now: an annotated reader (Suddenly.org, 2008)

== Honors and awards ==
Stadler has been awarded numerous prizes for his work, including a Guggenheim Fellowship, a Whiting Award, The Hinda Rosenthal Prize of the American Academy of Arts and Letters, a Howard Foundation Fellowship from Brown University, and a United States Artists Fellowship in 2006, the inaugural round of that program.
