= Casse =

Casse or CASSE may refer to:

- CASSE, Center for the Advancement of the Steady State Economy
- "Cassé", the Nolwenn Leroy's debut single from her eponymous album
- Cassi, a British tribe encountered by Julius Caesar
- Casse (surname)
- LaCasse, a surname
- Grande Casse, a mountain in the Graian Alps in France
- Pont Cassé, a populated place in Dominica
- Pont-du-Casse, a commune in the Lot-et-Garonne department in south-western France
- Digi Casse, a Japanese handheld game console
- Nez Cassé, a series of French locomotives
- Matthias Casse, a Belgian judo player
