= Constant Montald =

Belgian artist

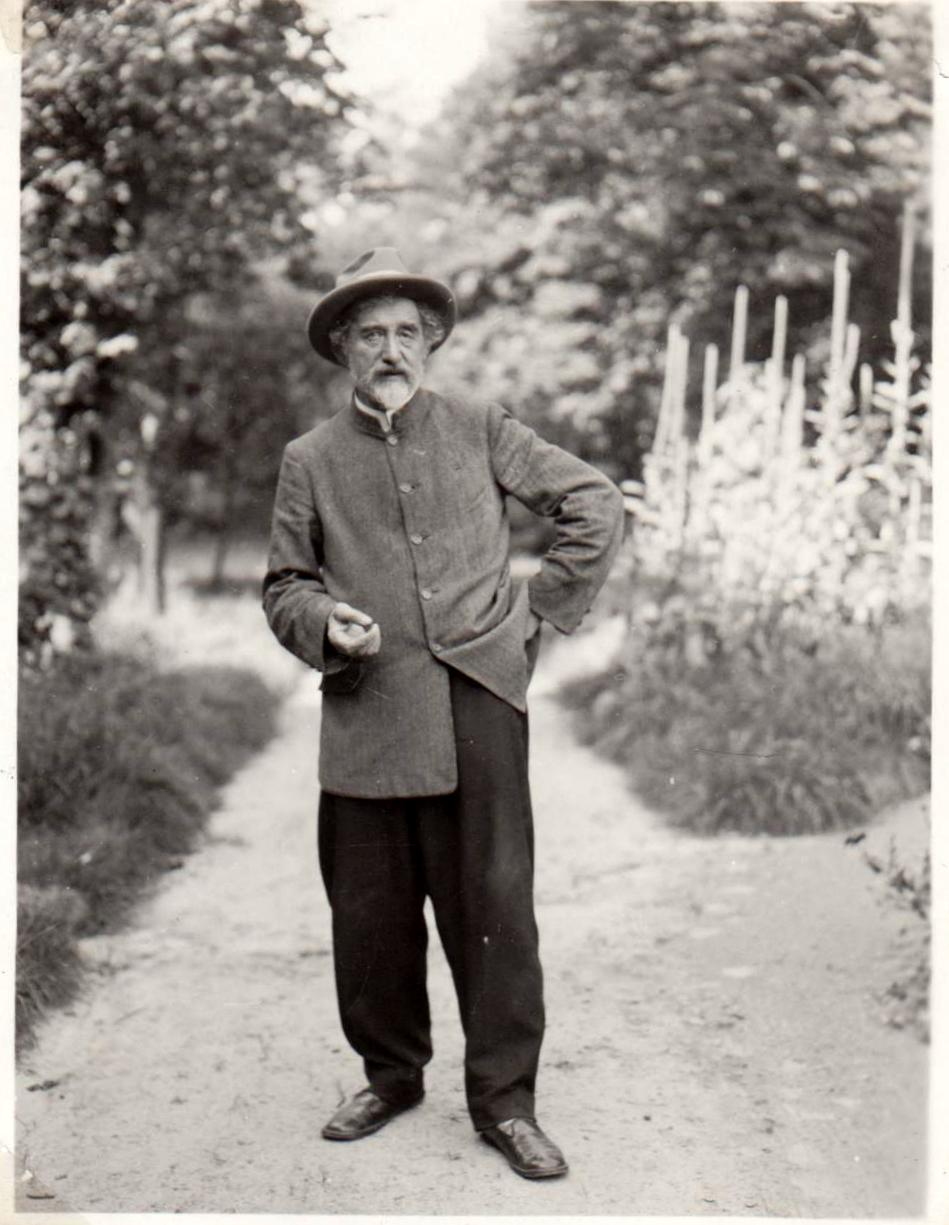
- Montald in 1930
- Born: 4 December 1862; Ghent, Belgium
- Died: 5 March 1944 (aged 81); Brussels
- Known for: Paintings
- Movement: Symbolism and Art Nouveau

Constant Montald (4 December 1862 – 5 March 1944) was a Belgian painter, muralist, and teacher.

Constant Montald, With spouse Gabrielle Canivet and niece Margareta Montald in his garden,1930

== Biography ==
=== Early years ===
Montald was born in 1862 in Ghent. In 1874, while receiving an education in decorative painting at the technical school of Ghent during the day, Montald also enrolled in the evening classes of the Royal Academy of Fine Arts in Ghent. There, in 1885, he won a competition and received a grant from the city which enabled him to live and study briefly in Paris with fellow artist Henri Privat-Livemont at the École des Beaux-Arts. In Paris, he painted his first monumental canvas, The Human Struggle, a 5 by 10m canvas which he later donated to the city of Ghent. There, the work was displayed in the grand hall of the Palace of Justice. Since then it has been on display on a wall of the hall of the Court of Appeal.

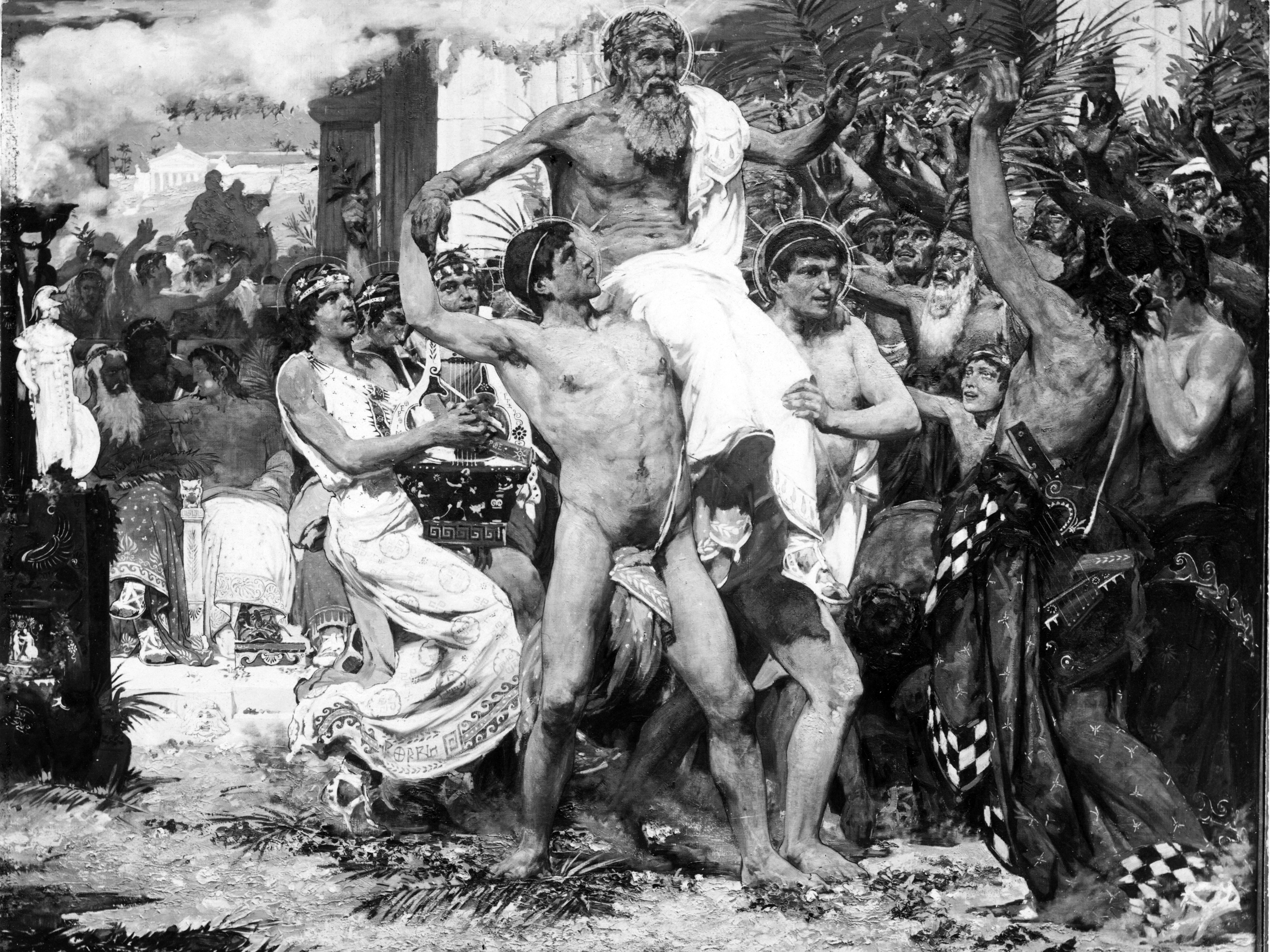
Diagoras in triumph carried by his sons

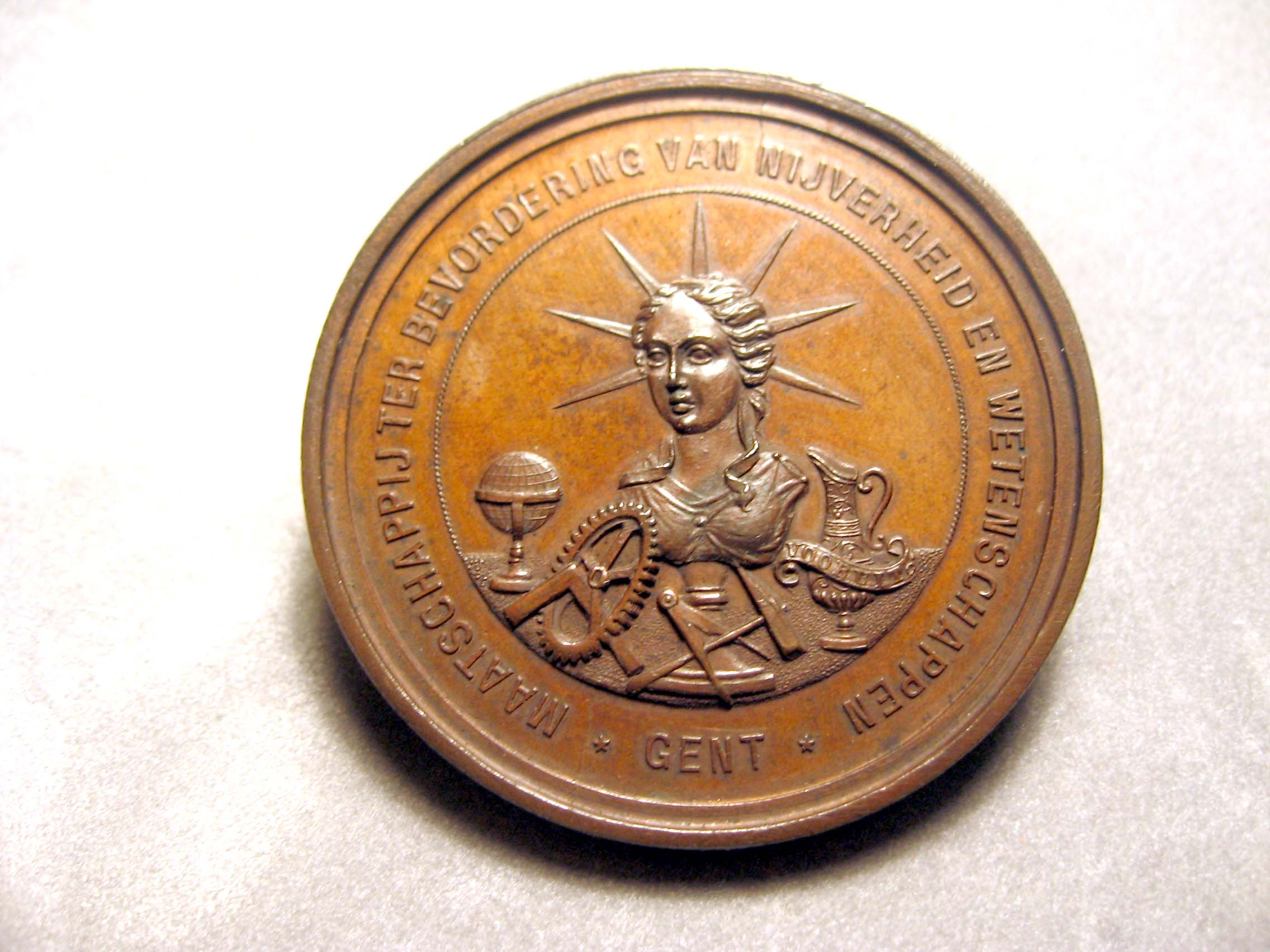
The medal shows the publisher, i.e. "The society for the furtherment of Industry and Science-Ghent"

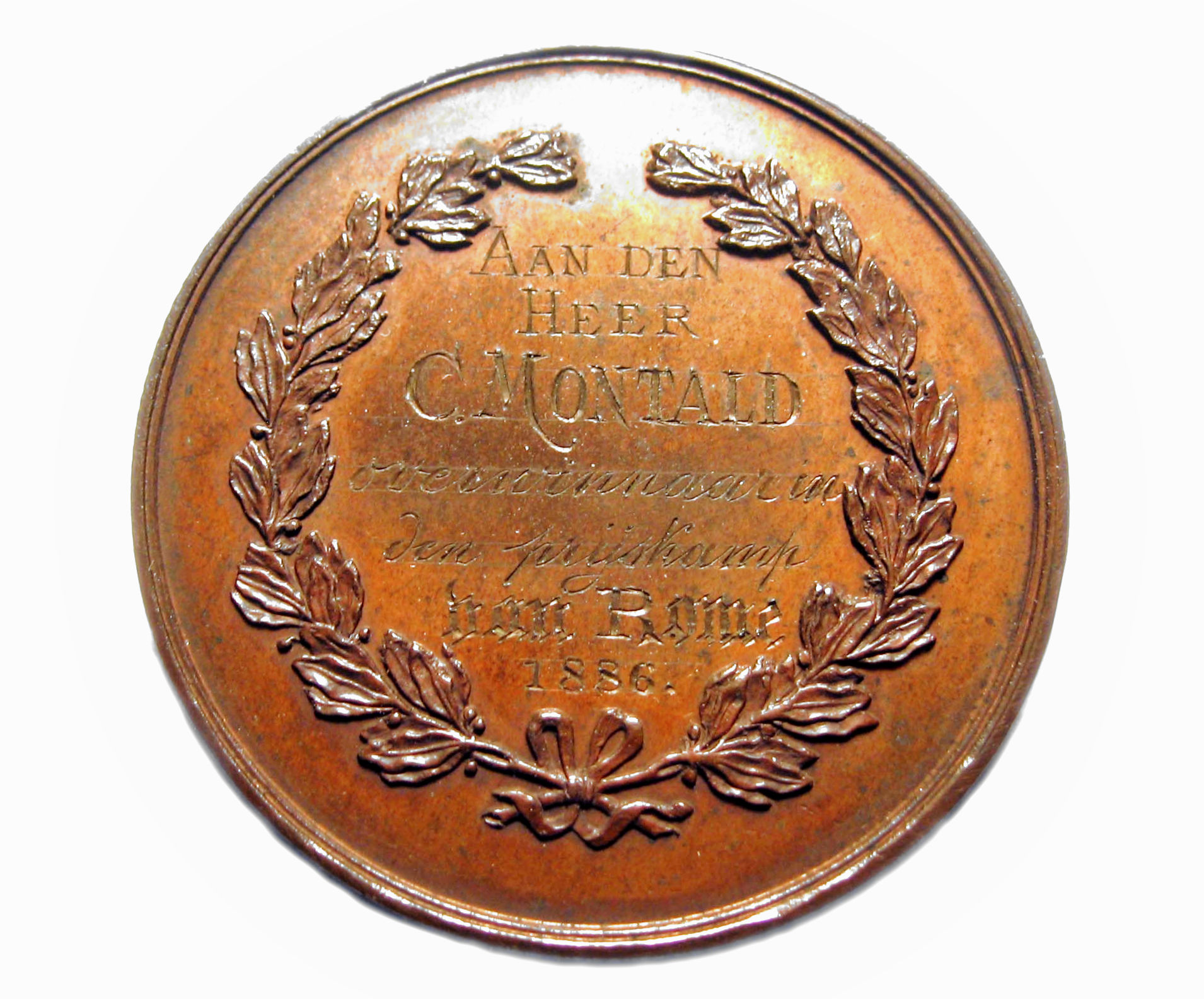
On the back "to the gentleman C.Montald, winner of the competition of Rome, 1886"

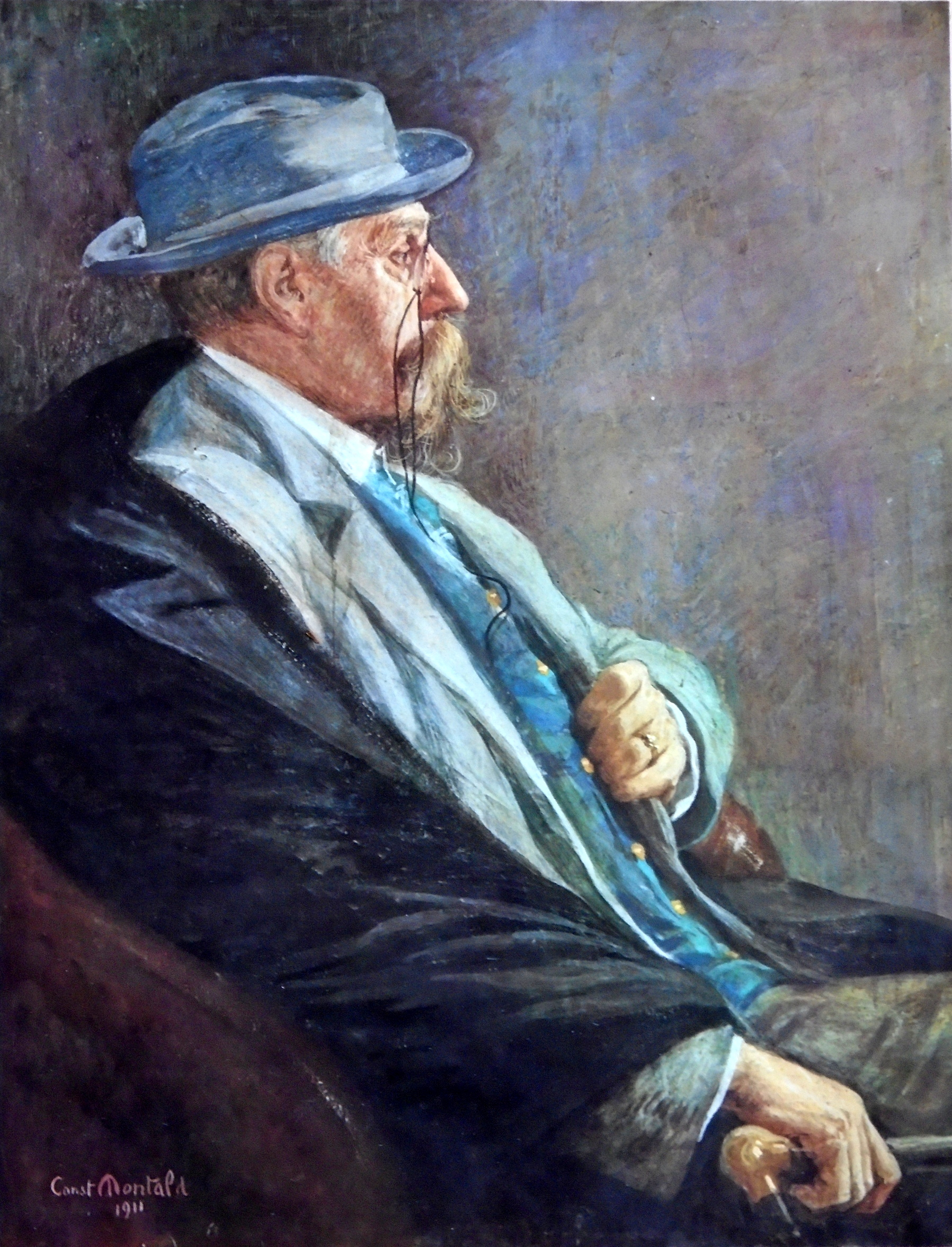
Emile Verhaeren

In 1886, Montald went on to win the Belgian Prix de Rome for his work "Diagoras in triumph carried by his sons, victors of the Olympic Games of Ancient Greece". Montald's victory was extensively celebrated in his home town of Ghent and he received a commendation and the medal from the "Society for improvement of Industry and Science".

He then went on a grand tour of Italy and was greatly impressed by the Sistine Chapel and the work of Giotto di Bondone. He traveled extensively until he eventually settled in Florence, where he made preparations for a grand work he eventually completed in Rome. This grand work, titled "Social Contradictions", was kept in the basement of the Royal Museum of Art and History of Brussels after it was displayed there in 1890 after being sent over from Rome. In his Roman workshop, Montald painted another enormous decorative work titled "The Eolian Harps" (currently being kept in the depot of the Museum of Fine Arts of Belgium in Brussels), that was displayed at the Salon of Ghent in 1892.

=== Marriage ===
In 1891, Montald returned to Belgium, after a trip to Egypt. On 9 August 1892, he married Gabrielle Canivet, a fellow artist who specialized in decorative compositions for fabrics. In 1894, he, Jean Delville, Auguste Donnay and Léon Frédéric participated in an exhibition in Brussels, organized by the esoteric study group Kumris.

In 1896, Montald scored high marks in an entrance exam for professor of the decorative arts at the Academy of Fine Arts in Brussels, a post he would hold until 1932. His students there include some of the best-known names among Belgian painters: René Magritte, Paul Delvaux, Edgard Tytgat, Paul Cauchie, Joseph Lacasse, Armand Bonnetain, Paul Heymans along with many others.

In the same year, he participated in the Premier Salon d’Art Idéaliste of Jean Delville, where he exhibited alongside Victor Rousseau and Léon Frédéric. He also designed the decoration of the tympanum in the Royal Dutch Theater of Ghent (a building designed by architect Eduard De Vigne). It is a mosaïc made by De Smet.

After being impressed by the mysterious and overwhelming San Marco basilica in Venice, Montald was intrigued by the way golden backgrounds influenced the color of the paintings. Under these influences he painted several works in 1907, including "The Boat of the Ideal" and "The Fountain of Inspiration". These works were originally intended for the grant hall of the Brussels museum, but were only put on display there after passing through many different hands. Later, he painted "The Hallowed Tree". When he exhibited these three paintings in 1906 in Brussels, he won a golden medal.

While Montald's first works were strongly influenced by the Pre-Raphaelite Brotherhood, gradually he focused on integrating humanity with their floral environment: Trees with winding branches, curtains of flowers and lawns strewn with surreal growths. Quickly, the environment took the spotlight while man was relegated to the background. His later works depicted Elysian dream-worlds with parks and fountains rendered in ornamental drawings. The emphasis was on gold and blue hues, Montald was inspired by the Byzantines, and tried to introduce musicality into the art of painting.

=== Villa ===
In 1909, Montald commissioned a villa for himself in Woluwe-Saint-Lambert. Soon, The "Villa Montald" became a meeting place for the intellectual elite he surrounded himself with, including friends like Emile Verhaeren (whom he met in 1889 in the studio of sculptor Charles Van der Stappen) and Stefan Zweig. Montald made several portraits of Emile Verhaeren.

The First World War prevented Montald from painting Monumental works, instead he focused on painting on an easel. Predominantly the landscapes surrounding his villa in Woluwe-Saint-Lambert.

=== Collaboration ===
Together with Jean Delville, Emile Fabry, Albert Ciamberlani, Emile Vloors and Omer Dierickx, Montald co-founded the group L'art monumental. This group promoted a decorative monumental style connected to architecture. Their major project is the semicircle northern and southern galleries of the Jubelpark Complex. Montald drew six designs for the project, which were realized in mosaic in 1926 by a specialized construction company. In 1922, Montald painted another monumental canvas: "France and Belgium suckle their children on the Fount of Goodness and Justness". Driven by sympathetic feelings towards Belgium's allies in the First World War, Montald donated this work to France, which knighted him into the Legion of Honour.

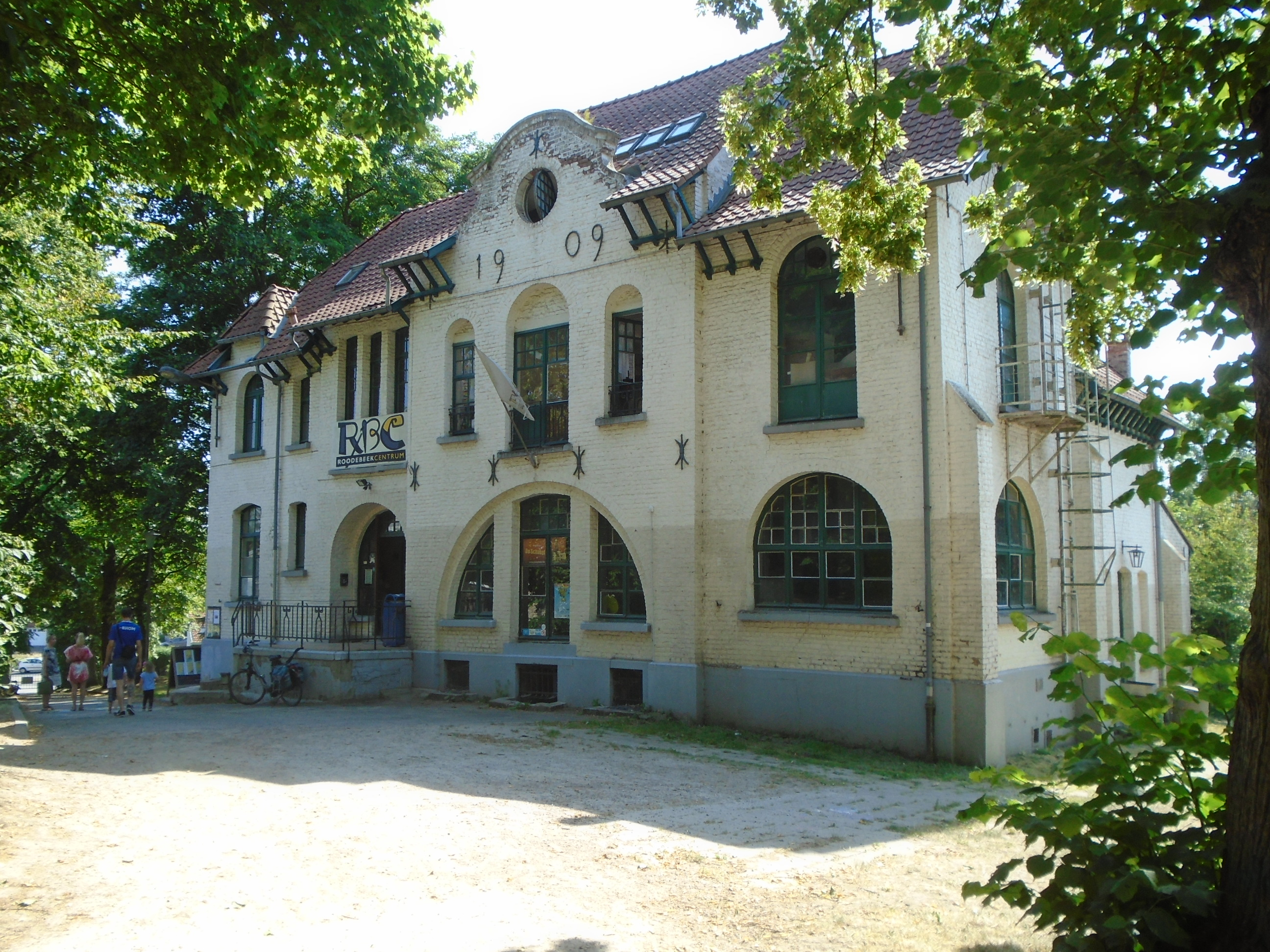
Villa Montald, Woluwe-Saint-Lambert. Here Montald received friends such as Emile Verhaeren and Stefan Zweig

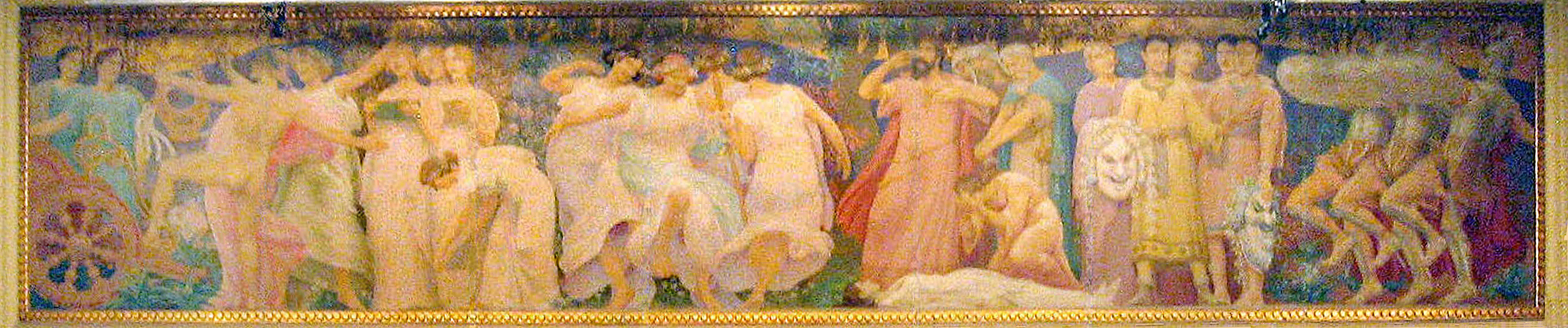
Frieze above the stage of the auditorium of the Leuven theater "Apollo and the muses" and "Orpheus mourning Eurydice"

In 1934, Montald painted two decorative canvases for the reconstructed Leuven Theater's auditorium. One canvas (diam. 9,25m) was mounted on the ceiling, the other (11,5m width and 2,25m high) above the stage. The latter is a two-part representation of, on one end, Apollo and the Muses and, on the other end, Orpheus mourning Eurydice.

=== Royal Academy ===
During his 37-year tenure (until 1932) at the Royal Academy of Fine Arts, Montald influenced many young students, René Magritte, Paul Delvaux, Jan De Cooman, Jean Maillard and Edgard Tytgat among them.

On 7 July 1934, Montald became a member of Royal Academy of Belgium. His last great decorative project, a mural on the graveyard wall of the Orval Abbey, was completed by his student Anto Carte.

=== Death ===
On 5 March 1944, Constant Montald, having become a widower in 1942, died of a stroke in Brussels while leaving the tram. His will stipulated a bi-annual award for monumental art, which was implemented in 1944. His heir and executor of his will, Jean Goffin, his wife's cousin, would later sell Montald's property (including his villa, park and gardens) to the town of Woluwe-Saint-Lambert.

=== Other works ===
- "The Nest" (1893) (Museum for Modern art in Brussels).
- "Snowfaces, Farmers and Bathers".
- Drawings and portraits of Emile Verhaeren.
- Murals.
- Sculptures, poster designs, Illustrations for the legend of Tijl Uilenspiegel, and designs for diplomas, telegrams and banknotes.
- Stained Glass Windows (1889) (Design Museum in Ghent).
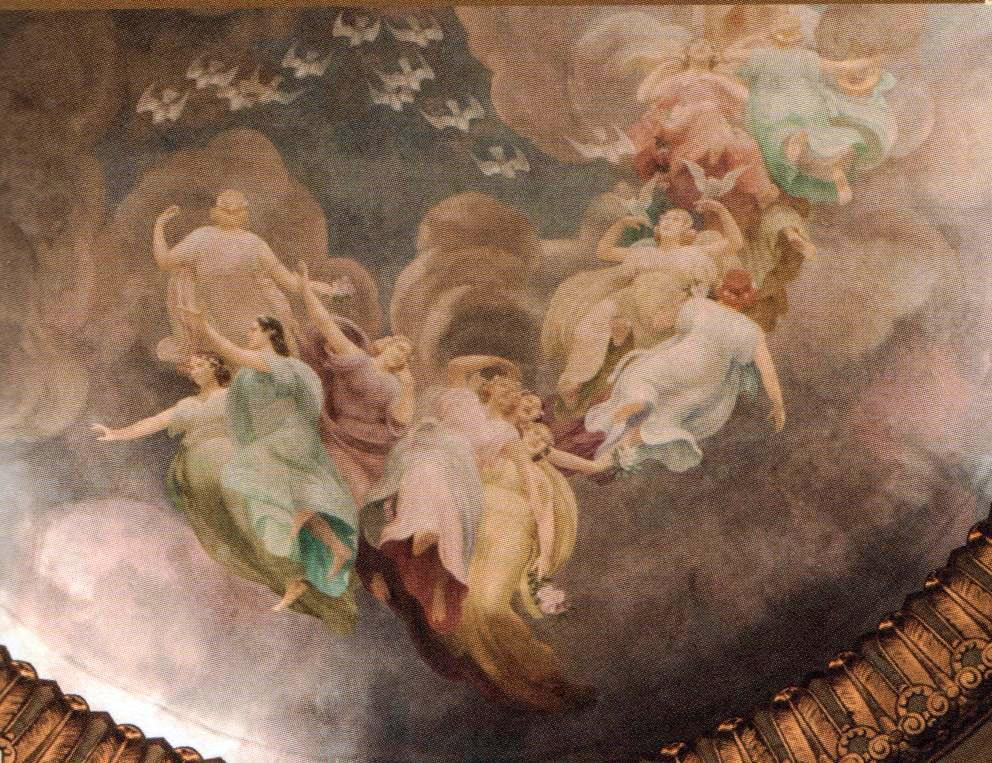
Ceiling painting, Leuven Theater (1906)

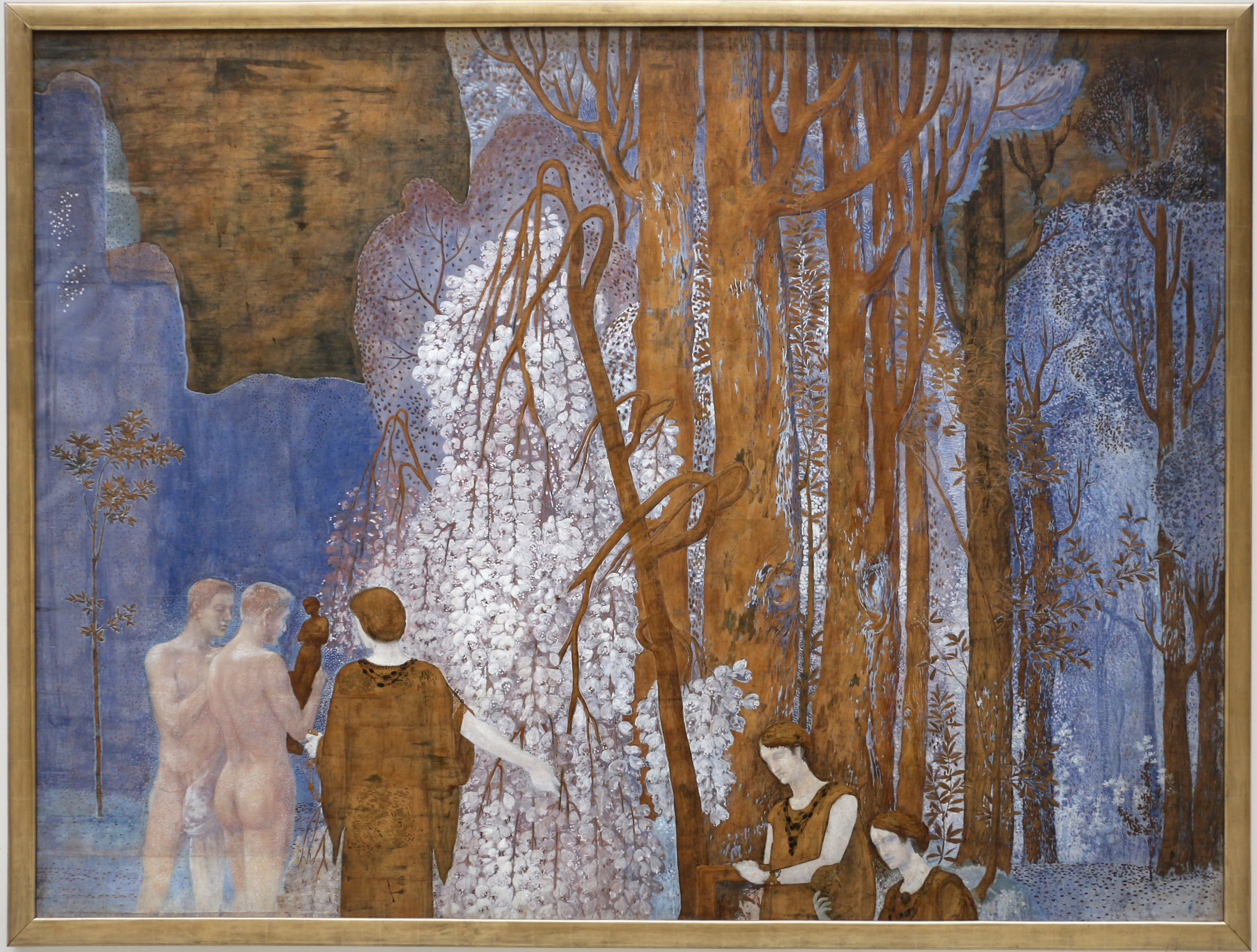
The Boat of the Ideal (1907)

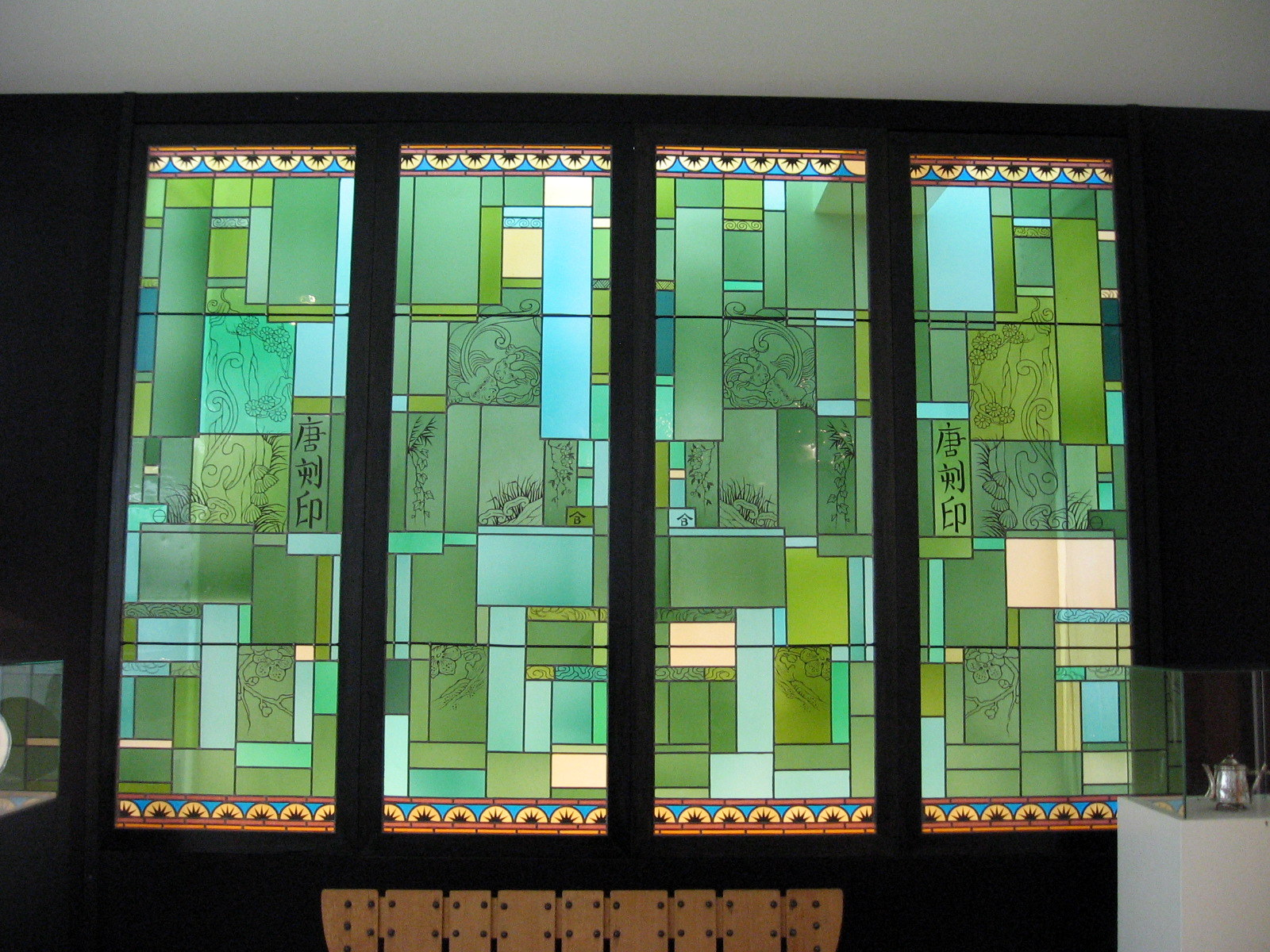
Stained glass window (1889)

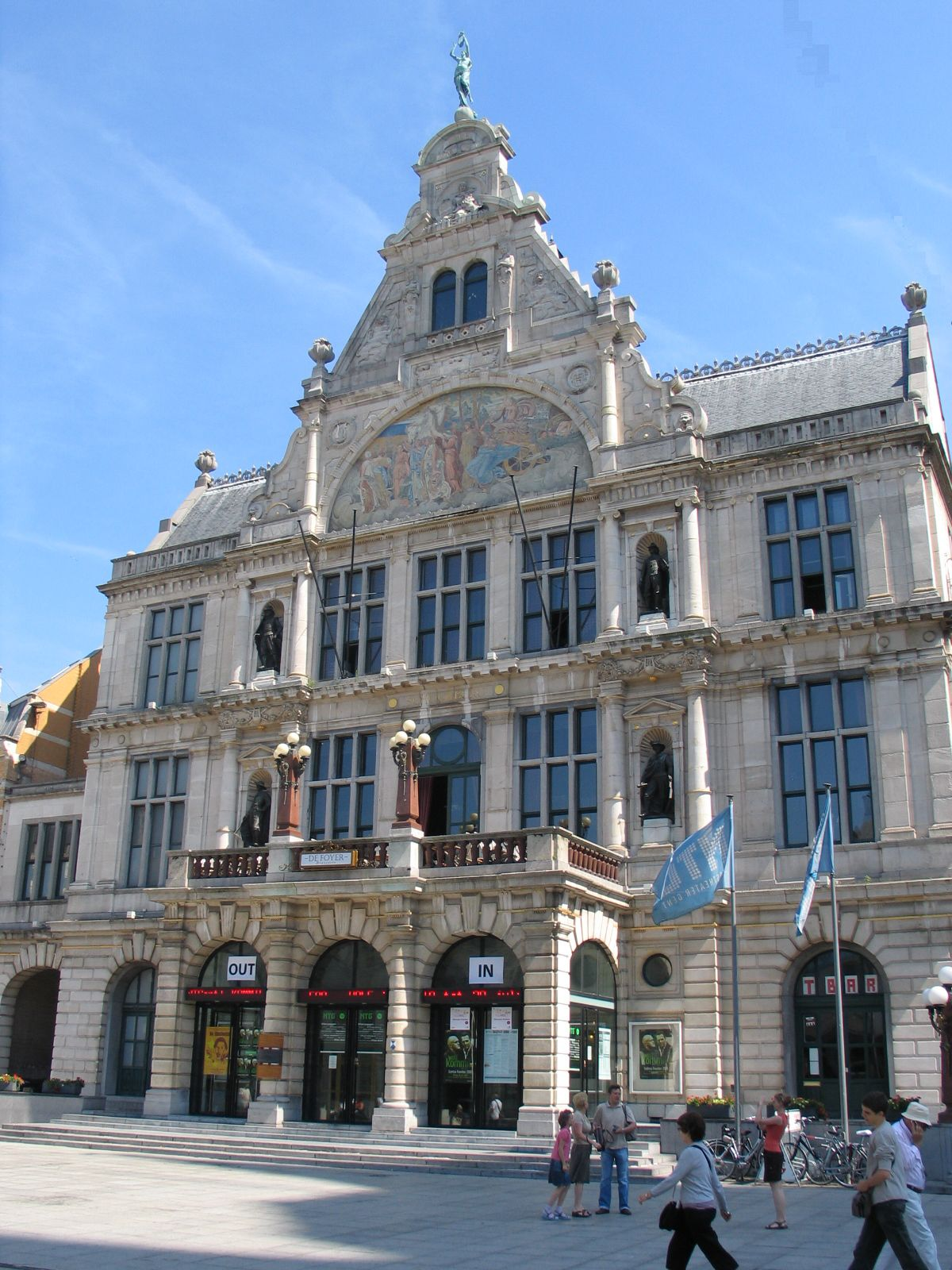
Mozaïc tympanum, Dutch Royal Theater, Ghent, (1899)

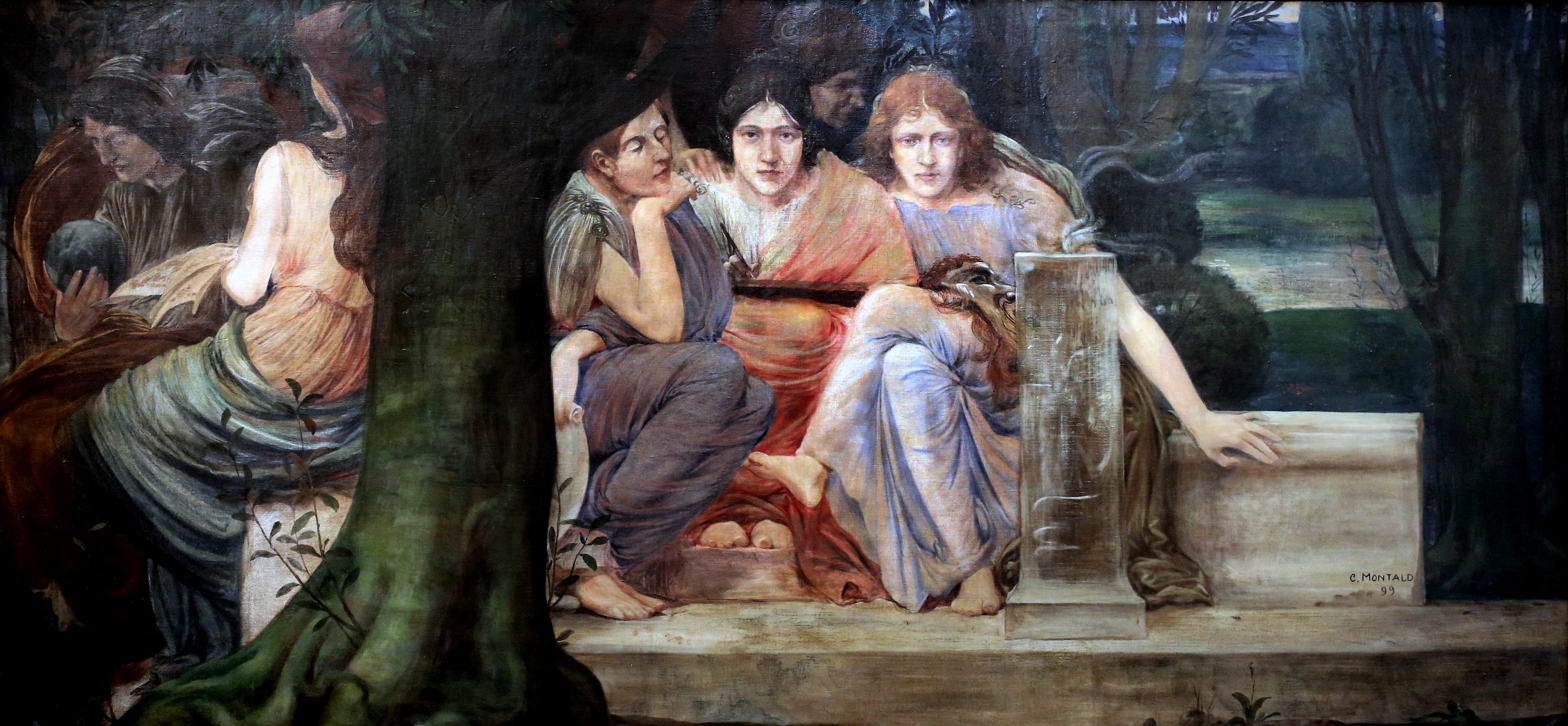
"Allegories of literary genre", (1899)

== Sources ==
- This page translated from its Dutch equivalent accessed 9/13/2010
