= Clear Cut Press =

Press based in Astoria, Oregon, US

Clear Cut Press was a small press based in Astoria, Oregon.

== About ==
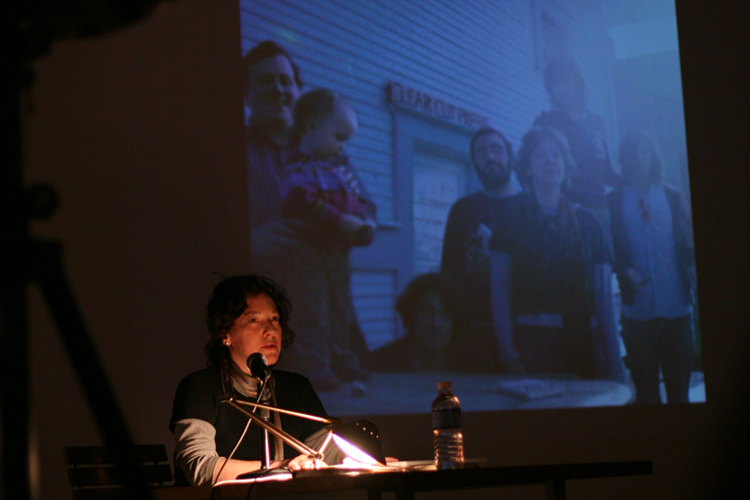
Author Stacey Levine reading at the Clear Cut Press presentation at MoMA's P.S.1 small press exhibition in February 2006. Projected photo shows Rich Jensen (left), Matthew Stadler (kneeling) Daniel Mitchell, Stacey Levine, Claire Evans, and Jona Bechtolt.

Clear Cut Press was founded by novelist Matthew Stadler and Up Records co-founder Rich Jensen in 2002. Jensen began talking to Stadler while taking a poetry class in 1997. Their mutual interest in cultural movements and the role of books lead to a discussion resulting in the press. Stadler realized that he knew about "a dozen writers who weren't reaching the audience they could--or weren't being published at all." Stadler noted that, "as a business and artistic venture, Clear Cut is inspired by early 20th century subscription presses, such as Hours Press and Contact Editions, and by the mid-century paperbacks of New Directions and City Lights." A series was available by subscription. Individual volumes were distributed to the trade.

As part of what Stadler referred to as the cultivation of "a long-term conversation that makes a community of readers (and therefore a market) that isn't reached through the national book review organs or most bookstores," Clear Cut actively participates in events in bookstores, warehouses, summer festivals, art museums, and non-traditional settings. Events included reading The Horse Hospital, MoMA PS1, Beyond Baroque, Bumbershoot, What the Heck Fest, KGB Bar, Space 1026, and Catch that Beat. In 2005, Clear Cut Press along with the Western Front Society sponsored Unassociated Writers Conference and Dance Party in Vancouver, BC, a self-organizing event in response to first Association of Writers & Writing Programs (AWP) Conference to take place outside of the United States.

== First series ==
=== 00 The Clear Cut Future ===
In 2003, Clear Cut released The Clear Cut Future, the first book in the series. The anthology included writing from the Pacific Northwest and elsewhere in what, according to the catalog, made "a map of the territory of interest to Clear Cut Press." Contributions included work by Stacey Levine, Charles D'Ambrosio, Steve Weiner, Tiffany Lee Brown, Emily White, Robert Glück, a former Enron executive. The Seattle Times noted, "Tightly written poems and short stories about existential love and loss mingle freely with essays about corporate sharks, architecture, botanical excursions and artists' memoirs."

One contributor, Patrick Bissell, was a street poet who sold his work on the streets of Seattle. Bissell was the subject of a profile by Jesse Tarbert in The Seattle Times published on May 6, 2003. Thirty eight at the time of the profile, Bissell grew up in Kirkland and began selling his poetry on the street in 1993. Of Bissell's work, "Stadler said "The Sweet Gift" contains some of Bissell's best writing. It reminded him of the work of Emmanuel Bove, a French writer of the early 1920s, he said. In both Bove's and Bissell's work, Stadler said, "the pacing and logic are so at ease, so like the drift of life, and yet it's very literary."

Other books in the series included:

- 01 Ode to certain interstates and Other Poems by Howard W. Robertson
- 02 Occasional Work and Seven Walks from the Office for Soft Architecture by Lisa Robertson
- 03 Denny Smith (stories) by Robert Glück
- 04 Core Sample: Portland Art Now
- 05 Orphans (essays) by Charles D'Ambrosio
- 06 Shoot the Buffalo (a novel) by Matt Briggs
- 07 Frances Johnson (a novel) by Stacey Levine

In addition, Clear Cut Press published a catalog of Portland painter Michael Brophy's work with an essay by Charles d'Ambrosio.

== Interim ==
=== The Back Room: An Anthology ===
In 2007, Clear Cut released an anthology edited by Matthew Stadler collecting work presented at the Back Room series in Portland, Oregon. The book included work by Mary Gaitskill, Lisa Robertson, Gore Vidal, Dodie Bellamy, Wayne Koestenbaum, Kevin Killian, Lawrence Rinder, Michael Hebb, Stephanie Snyder, Moira Roth, John O'Brian, Marc Joseph, Randy Gragg, Barbara Verchot, Anne Focke, and Daniel Duford.

== Second series ==
The second series of Clear Cut Press was announced on April 13, 2007 by Rich Jensen and Matthew Stadler. The books selected and edited by Matthew Stadler included work by Emily White, Bruce Benderson, Danielle Dutton, Stacy Doris, Matthijs Bouw. At the event, billed as The Clear Cut Press Potlach, Matthew Stadler announced as a result of being awarded a grant from the UA Artist Trust, he was leaving the press and the country in order to go to Mexico and write.
