= Aaron Peck =

Aaron Peck may refer to:

- Aaron Peck (writer) (born 1979), Canadian writer and educator
- Aaron Peck (American football) (born 1994), American football tight end
