= Casse (surname) =

Casse (French pronunciation: [kas]) is a French surname that may refer to the following notable people:

- Germain Casse (1837–1900), French journalist
- Jean-Baptiste du Casse (1646–1715), French Navy admiral
- Justin Casse, American bloodstock agent
- Mark E. Casse (born 1961), American horse trainer
- Matthias Casse (born 1997), Belgian judoka
- Mattia Casse (born 1990), Italian alpine ski racer
- Michel Cassé (born 1943), French astrophysicist, writer and poet
- Severine Casse (1805–1898), Danish women's rights activist
- Vincent Casse (born 1994), Belgian acrobatic gymnast

== See also ==
- LaCasse
