= LaCasse =

LaCasse or Lacasse (French pronunciation: [lakas]) is a French surname. Notable people with the surname include:

- Lou-Adriane Cassidy-Lacasse (born 1997), Canadian singer-songwriter
- Alex Lacasse, Canadian pop artist
- Cloé Lacasse (born 1993), Canadian soccer player
- Florent Lacasse (born 1981), French middle distance runner
- Geneviève Lacasse (born 1989), Canadian ice hockey player
- Josée Lacasse (born 1965), Canadian alpine skier
- Josée Lacasse (born 1970), Canadian rugby union player
- Joseph Lacasse (1894–1975), Belgian artist
- Joseph-Henri-Gustave Lacasse (1890–1953), Canadian journalist, physician and politician
- Marie-Ève Lacasse (born 1982), French writer
- Raphaëlle Lacasse (born 2000), Canadian tennis player
- Ryan LaCasse (born 1983), American football player
- Suzanne Lacasse (born 1948), Canadian civil engineer
- Emerance Maschmeyer-Lacasse (born 1994), Canadian ice hockey player
