= Chambersonic =

2024 poetry collection

- Author: Oana Avasilichioaei
- Publisher: Talonbooks
- Publication date: October 16, 2024
- Pages: 176
- ISBN: 978-1-7720-1626-0

Chambersonic is a 2024 poetry collection by Canadian poet and translator Oana Avasilichioaei, published by Talonbooks. A multimedia book, it consists of "poems, essays, performance scores, and audio recordings" and "thematically and formally reflects on the practice of soundmaking."

== Critical reception ==
Janani Ambikapathy, writing for the Poetry Foundation, noted the book's dual sensibilities: on one hand, "a rehearsal or performance space where music is being composed and played," while the other, "the mind-space of the artist reflecting on their practice." Ambikapathy also noted Avasilichioaei's use of visual symbols and QR codes in order to further incorporate music into her poetics.

Frances Grace Fyfe, writing for the Montreal Review of Books, likened Avasilichioaei's command of the pause to that of John Cage's, whom she references. Upon observing her poems about Gaza, Fyfe concluded: "maybe denouncing genocide and the institution’s complicity therein is less the work of poetry and more the work of its readers, or of anyone with a voice and the good fortune to broadcast it from a platform."
