= Jennifer Bélanger =

Canadian writer

Jennifer Bélanger (born 1991 in Montreal) is a Canadian writer from Quebec. Her debut novel Menthol, published in 2020, was a shortlisted finalist for the Governor General's Award for French-language fiction at the 2020 Governor General's Awards.
