= The Baudelaire Fractal =

2020 novel by Lisa Robertson

- First edition
- Author: Lisa Robertson
- Language: English
- Published: 2020
- Publisher: Coach House Press
- Publication place: Canada
- Pages: 160
- ISBN: 978-1552453902

The Baudelaire Fractal is the debut novel by Canadian poet Lisa Robertson. Published in 2020, it shifts locations between London, Vancouver, Paris and the French countryside, dealing with a modern writer who has unexpectedly written the complete works of Charles Baudelaire.

The novel was shortlisted for the Governor General's Award for English-language fiction at the 2020 Governor General's Awards.
