= The Kootenay School of Writing =

Writers' collective based in Vancouver, Canada

The Kootenay School of Writing (KSW) is a Vancouver-based writers' collective.

Founded in 1984 after the forced closure of David Thompson University Centre in Nelson, British Columbia. KSW relocated to Vancouver to offer inexpensive courses (in writing, editing, and publishing), to sponsor colloquia and critical talks on writing, visual art, and politics, and to host a reading series with local, Canadian, and international writers, and to continue publishing Writing magazine.

The first KSW brochure, published before the school had its own address, offered a variety of courses and workshops in various locations around Vancouver, as well as listing readings and talks upcoming. It included the following statement of intent:

"The Kootenay School of Writing is a continuation of the Writing Program of David Thompson University Centre in Nelson, B.C., closed by order of the Social Credit government in May 1984. At DTUC, the Writing Program offered a broad interdisciplinary spectrum of courses, providing students with the usual seminars in prose, poetry and scriptwriting, as well as instruction in manuscript preparation, copyediting, book and magazine production, layout, design, typesetting, word processing, marketing, journalism, and interaction with artists in many other disciplines.

The Kootenay School of Writing is a response to the failure of most public institutions to serve their artistic communities. It stands in opposition to the concept of ‘culture industry’ in its recognition that theory, practice, and teaching of writing is best left to working writers. To this end, the School represents a new hybrid: a form of parallel gallery and centre of scholarship, open to the needs of its own constituency and alert to the possibilities of all disciplines that involve language. The Kootenay School of Writing welcomes both beginning and established artists in all disciplines to share in its programs as both participants and observers. Please let us know what you’d like to see and hear."

In the 1990s the KSW's focus shifted away from professional writing courses in favour of the reading series, talks and occasional workshops. At the beginning of the 21st century, KSW opened the Charles Watts Memorial library and resource centre on Hamilton Street in Vancouver and commenced publication of a new magazine, W. Today, KSW continues to function as a "Writer-Run Centre", the sole institutional analogy to the government-sponsored Artist-run centres that have been at the heart of contemporary arts production in Canada since the 1970s.

The organisation is incorporated as a not-for-profit society and is operated by a volunteer collective of practising writers, without an administrative director.

== What Is To Be Undone? ==
In January 2008 KSW was awarded $50,000 from Arts Partners in Creative Development (an arts investment partnership of the Province of British Columbia, Canada Council for the Arts, City of Vancouver, Vancouver Organizing Committee for the 2010 Olympic and Paralympic Winter Games (VANOC) and 2010 Legacies Now) to commission 18 Canadian and US poets to create new works for a colloquium entitled "What Is To Be Undone? Positions and Poetics in the 21st Century" to be held in August 2008 in Vancouver.

== Members ==
Current members include Donato Mancini, Danielle LaFrance, Tomasz Michalak, Nancy Gillespie, Kim Duff, Jeff Derksen, Michael Barnholden, Jordan Scott, Dorothy Trujillo Lusk, and Reg Johanson.

Past members include Aaron Vidaver, Andrew Klobucar, Craig MacKie, Sachiko Murakami, Fred Wah, Andrea Actis, Lary Bremner (Timewell), Margot Butler, Colin Browne, Suzanne Buffam, Ted Byrne, Susan Clark, Maureen Colclough, Victor Coleman, Emily Fedoruk, Stephen Collis, Peter Conlin, Peter Cummings, Dennis Denisoff, Jeff Derksen, Roger Farr, Soma Feldmar, Kirsten Forkert, Steven Forth, Robyn Laba, Kathryn MacLeod, Rob Manery, Nicholas Perrin, Alicia Priest, Meredith Quartermain, Nikki Reimer, Lisa Robertson, Tony Ruzza, Pauline Butling, Nancy Shaw, Cris Costa, Colin Smith, Tom Snyders, Catriona Strang, Jacqueline Turner, Tom Wayman, Calvin Wharton, Gary Whitehead, and Jonathon Wilcke.

== See also ==
- List of writers from British Columbia
