= The Dissolution of Nicholas Dee =

1993 novel by Matthew Stadler

- 2000 Grove Press cover
- Author: Matthew Stadler
- Language: English
- Genre: Novel
- Publisher: Charles Scribner's Sons (orig. publisher) & Grove Press
- Publication date: 1993
- Publication place: United States
- Media type: Print (hardback & paperback)
- Pages: 311 pp (Grove Press edition)
- ISBN: 0-8021-3696-6 (Grove Press edition)
- OCLC: 42780585

The Dissolution of Nicholas Dee is a 1993 American novel by Matthew Stadler. The book is a striking example of postmodern narrative technique, in which different genres and styles of expression are mixed together.

== Plot summary ==
Nicholas Dee, a young, anxiety-ridden history professor, lives in an unnamed American city battered by winter storms, plagued by crime, and patrolled by police in choppers and riot gear. Haunted by memories of his brilliant father and by the fear of loss, Nicholas takes shelter in his research: a history of the practice of insurance. One night, after a chance encounter with the police, he is made the guardian of a beautiful teenage delinquent, Oscar Vega. But the boy is a part of a scheme to ensnare Nicholas, the tool of a mysterious female dwarf named Amelia Weathered, once the lover of Nicholas' father. Made an outlaw, Nicholas flees with Amelia, her young son Francis, and Oscar to the half-drowned country of Holland, where the boundaries between his historical research, his fantasies, and Amelia's schemes all begin to blend together.

Scattered throughout the novel are passages from Nicholas Dee's scholarly writing, chronicle of a seventeenth century Dutch opera-house, which was built in a coastal swamp on the advice of a fortune-teller and housed a single performance before being swept out to sea in a storm. The chronicle is intended by Dee to serve as a case study within his history of insurance. But by the end of the book, a personal narrative has emerged from Dee's impersonal history, the story of a man's friendship with a boy soprano.

Interpenetrating and linking the inner text by Nicholas Dee and the outer one by Matthew Stadler are snatches of music - extracts from the score of The Tempest, Henry Purcell's operatic setting of Shakespeare's play.

== Critical reception ==
According to Publishers Weekly, "the story is neither exciting nor thought-provoking", and "the end result is simply deadening."
