= Dennis Denisoff =

Canadian author, poet and scholar

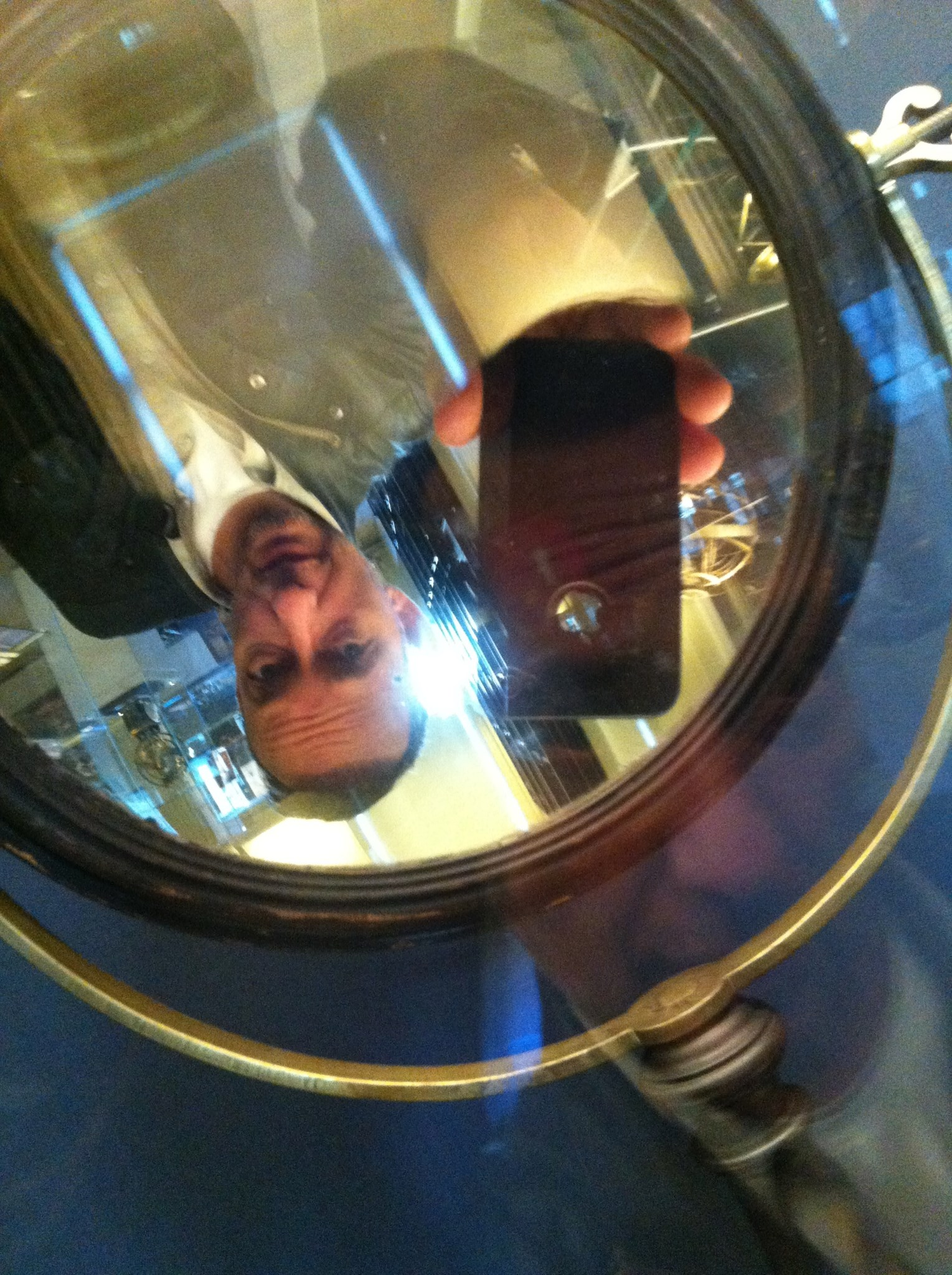
- Occupations: novelist, poet, academic

Dennis Denisoff is a Canadian author, poet and scholar, faculty in the Bread Loaf Summer program at Middlebury College, and professor emeritus of Literature and Film in the English Department at the University of Tulsa. Denisoff was an early member of The Kootenay School of Writing. He is a Fellow of the Royal Society of Canada and a Fellow of the Royal Historical Society.

== Biography ==
=== Education ===
He completed a PhD at McGill University and a postdoctoral fellowship at Princeton University, and was McFarlin Chair of English at the University of Tulsa. His research specialties include the environmental humanities, gender/sexuality studies, decadence/aestheticism, and eco-pagan politics.

=== Career ===
He was an early member of The Kootenay School of Writing in the 1980s, writing poetry and prose at the intersection of queer identity and LANGUAGE poetics. A runner-up in the Three-Day Novel Contest in 1989, Denisoff's debut novel Dog Years was published in 1991 by Arsenal Pulp Press while he was a Ph.D. student at McGill University. The novel, about a protagonist with HIV/AIDS, was a finalist for the Hugh Maclennan Prize in 1992 and the Norma Epstein Award.

In 1994, Denisoff published a poetry collection, Tender Agencies, and edited the anthology Queeries: An Anthology of Gay Male Prose. His second novel, The Winter Gardeners, was published in 2003, and in 2004 he published The Broadview Anthology of Victorian Short Stories.

His academic publications include Erín Moure and Her Works (1995), Aestheticism and Sexual Parody: 1840-1940 (2001), Sexual Visuality from Literature to Film: 1850-1950 (2004), and Decadent Ecology in British Literature and Art (2022). He is the editor of The Nineteenth-Century Child and Consumer Culture (2008), a special issue of Victorian Review on Natural Environments (2011), and another for Victorian Literature and Culture on Scales of Decadence, as well as being a co-editor of Perennial Decay: On the Aesthetics and Politics of Decadence (1999) and the digital humanities project The Yellow Nineties Online (2015). In addition, he has edited the Cambridge Companion to Victorian Literature and the Environment (2026) and Arthur Machen: Decadent and Occult Works (2018), as well as co-edited The Routledge Companion to Victorian Literature (2020). He has also been a co-editor of the journals White Wall Review, Nineteenth Century Studies and Feminist Modernist Literature.

He is the recipient of the President's Award from the Nineteenth Century Studies Association and the Sarwan Sohata Distinguished Scholar Award from Toronto Metropolitan University (previously Ryerson University), and has been a visiting researcher at the University of Exeter, Cambridge University, and Queen Mary—University of London.

He currently co-edits the series "Victorian Literature, Science, and the Environment" for Cambridge University Press.

=== Personal life ===
He lives in Nelson, British Columbia with his partner Morgan Holmes.

== Works ==
=== Fiction ===
- Dog Years (1991)
- The Winter Gardeners (2003)

=== Poetry ===
- Tender Agencies (1994)

=== Anthologies ===
- Queeries: An Anthology of Gay Male Prose (1994)
- The Broadview Anthology of Victorian Short Stories (2004)
- Arthur Machen: Decadent and Occult Works (2019)

=== Academic ===
- Erín Moure and Her Works (1995)
- Perennial Decay: On the Aesthetics and Politics of Decadence (co-edited with Liz Constable and Matt Potolsky, 1999)
- Aestheticism and Sexual Parody: 1840-1940 (2001)
- Sexual Visuality from Literature to Film: 1850-1950 (2004)
- The Nineteenth-Century Child and Consumer Culture (2008)
- Natural Environments guest edited special issue of Victorian Review
- The Yellow Nineties Online (co-edited with Lorraine Janzen Kooistra, 2015)
- The Routledge Companion to Victorian Literature (co-edited with Talia Schaffer, 2020)
- Scales of Decadence guest edited special issue of Victorian Literature and Culture (2021)
- Decadent Ecology in British Literature and Art, 1860-1910: Decay, Desire, and the Pagan Revival (2022)
- Victorian Literature and the Environment (2026)
- Decadence and the Environment guest edited special issue of volupté: Interdisciplinary Journal of Decadence Studies (2027)
