= Frédérique Bernier =

Canadian writer

- Education: McGill University (Ph.D.) Université de Montréal (M.A.)
- Occupations: Professor, writer
- Employer: Cégep de Saint-Laurent
- Notable work: Hantises
- Awards: Governor General’s Literary Award

Frédérique Bernier is a Canadian writer and professor of literature at the Cégep de Saint-Laurent in Quebec. Her book Hantises won the Governor General's Award for French-language non-fiction at the 2020 Governor General's Awards.
