= Hantises =

Book by Frédérique Bernier

- Carnet de Frida Burns
- Author: Frédérique Bernier
- Language: French
- Genre: Non-fiction
- Published: 2020
- Publisher: Nota bene
- Publication place: Canada
- Media type: Print (Paperback, PDF)
- Pages: 88
- Award: Governor General’s Literary Award
- ISBN: 9782895187165

Hantises (English: Hauntings) is a book written by Canadian writer Frédérique Bernier, published in 2020 by Nota bene. It won the 2020 Governor General's Literary Award for French-language nonfiction.

== Backstory ==
Bernier says, "Hantises is a book that pretty much wrote itself." She explains that the first sections were born of an impulse to forge links between life experiences and her relationship with literature. The rest became a reality after receiving an invitation from her publisher who at the time was looking for essays for Nota bene's "Miniatures" collection.

== Synopsis ==
Hantises is an intellectual and lyrical autobiography of an alter ego name Friday Burns. It raises concerns about perilous connections that exist between books and people's lives. It is intended as a tribute to literature and to love stories, whether written on paper or experienced in real life.

== Awards ==
Hantises won the 2020 Governor General's Award for French-language non-fiction at the 2020 Governor General's Awards.

== Reception ==
The book was generally well received in Bernier's home province of Quebec. Isabelle Beaulieu at Les libraires writes, "The intelligence shown by Frédérique Bernier in Hantises is that the author does not try to camouflage the shadows that inhabit her." Jérémie Mcewen, special correspondent for La Presse calls Hantises, "A short, but complicated book. Its author does not try to be understood by everyone, and paradoxically, it did me good to find my reading it difficult".
