= Oana Avasilichioaei =

Canadian poet and translator

- Occupations: Poet; Translator
- Writing career
- Notable awards: A. M. Klein Prize for Poetry; Governor General's Award for French to English translation

Oana Avasilichioaei is a Canadian poet and translator.

Her poetry work includes Expeditions of a Chimæra (2009), a collaboration with Erín Moure, and We Beasts (2012), which won the A.M. Klein Prize for Poetry. As a translator, she is most noted for winning the Governor General's Award for French to English translation in 2017 for Readopolis, her translation of Bertrand Laverdure's Lectodôme.

Her poetry collection Eight Track was shortlisted for the Governor General's Award for English-language poetry at the 2020 Governor General's Awards. In the same year she also received her second nomination for French to English translation for The Neptune Room, her translation of Laverdure's La chambre neptune. In 2024, she published another poetry collection, Chambersonic.
