= Donna Kane (writer) =

Canadian poet

Donna Kane is a Canadian poet from Rolla, British Columbia.

She is most noted for her 2020 poetry collection Orrery, which was a shortlisted finalist for the Governor General's Award for English-language poetry at the 2020 Governor General's Awards.

== Books ==
- Somewhere, a Fire (2004)
- Erratic (2007)
- Pioneer 10, I Hear You (2016)
- Summer of the Horse (2018)
- Orrery (2020)
