= 2020 Governor General's Awards =

Canadian literary award

The shortlisted nominees for the 2020 Governor General's Awards for Literary Merit were announced on May 4, 2021, and the winners were announced on June 1. Ordinarily the award shortlists and winners would have been named in fall 2020, but were delayed due to the COVID-19 pandemic in Canada.

== English ==
Category	Winner	Nominated
Fiction	Michelle Good, Five Little Indians	Francesca Ekwuyasi, Butter Honey Pig Bread; Thomas King, Indians on Vacation; Lisa Robertson, The Baudelaire Fractal; Leanne Betasamosake Simpson, Noopiming: The Cure for White Ladies
Non-fiction	Madhur Anand, This Red Line Goes Straight to Your Heart	Billy-Ray Belcourt, A History of My Brief Body; Ivan Coyote, Rebent Sinner; Amanda Leduc, Disfigured: On Fairy Tales, Disability and Making Space; Tessa McWatt, Shame on Me
Poetry	Anne Carson, Norma Jeane Baker of Troy	Oana Avasilichioaei, Eight Track; Donna Kane, Orrery; Canisia Lubrin, The Dyzgraphxst; Sachiko Murakami, Render
Drama	Kim Senklip Harvey, Kamloopa: An Indigenous Matriarch Story	Yolanda Bonnell, bug; Christopher Cook, Quick Bright Things; Charlotte Corbeil-Coleman, Guarded Girls; Donna-Michelle St. Bernard, Sound of the Beast
Children's literature	Eric Walters, The King of Jam Sandwiches	Sara Cassidy, Nevers; Polly Horvath, Pine Island Home; Colleen Nelson and Tara Anderson, Harvey Holds His Own; David A. Robertson, The Barren Grounds
Children's illustration	The Fan Brothers, The Barnabus Project	Naseem Hrab and Frank Viva, Weekend Dad; Jordan Scott and Sydney Smith, I Talk Like a River; Jillian Tamaki, Our Little Kitchen; Rebecca Thomas and Maya McKibbin, Swift Fox All Along
French to English translation	Lazer Lederhendler, If You Hear Me (Pascale Quiviger, Si tu m'entends)	Oana Avasilichioaei, The Neptune Room (Bertrand Laverdure, La chambre neptune); Alexis Diamond, Amaryllis & Little Witch (Pascal Brullemans, Vipérine and Petit sorcière); Pablo Strauss, The Country Will Bring Us No Peace (Matthieu Simard, Ici, ailleurs); J. C. Sutcliffe, Back Roads (Andrée A. Michaud, Routes secondaires)

== French ==
Category	Winner	Nominated
Fiction	Sophie Létourneau, Chasse à l'homme	Jennifer Bélanger, Menthol; Naomi Fontaine, Shuni; Marie-Ève Lacasse, Autobiographie de l'étranger; Marie-Pier Lafontaine, Chienne
Non-fiction	Frédérique Bernier, Hantises	Thomas Dommange, Le rapt ontologique; Michaël La Chance, Une épine empourprée; Guylaine Massoutre, Nous sommes le soleil; Stanley Péan, De préférence la nuit
Poetry	Martine Audet, La Société des cendres	Paul Bélanger, Déblais; Hugues Corriveau, Et là, mon père suivi de Et là, ma mère; Symon Henry, L'Amour des oiseaux moches; Louis-Karl Picard-Sioui, Les visages de la terre
Drama	Martin Bellemare, Cœur minéral	Le Collectif Aalaapi (Louisa Naluiyuk, Akinisie Novalinga, Mélodie Duplessis, Audrey Alasuak and Samantha Leclerc), Aalaapi, faire silence pour entendre quelque chose de beau; Suzie Bastien, Sucré seize (Huit filles); Olivier Choinière, Zoé; Claude Guilmain, AmericanDream.ca
Children's literature	François Blais, Lac Adélard	Camille Bouchard, Cicatrices; Magali Laurent, L'Ogre et l'enfant; Johanne Mercier, Il faut du tout pour faire un monstre; Maryse Pagé, Rap pour violoncelle seul
Children's illustration	Katia Canciani and Guillaume Perreault, Pet et Répète: La véritable histoire	Cathon, Mimose & Sam : Mission hibernation; Valérie Fontaine and Nathalie Dion, Le grand méchant loup dans ma maison; Mireille Levert, Le pays aux mille soleils; Kim Nunès, Marie-Chantal Perron, Tammy Verge and Amélie Dubois, copine et Copine
English to French translation	Georgette LeBlanc, Océan (Susan Goyette, Ocean)	Arianne Des Rochers, Jonny Appleseed (Joshua Whitehead, Jonny Appleseed); Daniel Grenier, On pleure pas au bingo (Dawn Dumont, Nobody Cries at Bingo); Sonya Malaborza, L'Accoucheuse de Scots Bay (Ami McKay, The Birth House); Sophie Voillot, La Société du feu de l’enfer (Rawi Hage, Beirut Hellfire Society)
