= Georgette LeBlanc (poet) =

Canadian poet and translator (born 1977)

Georgette Leblanc
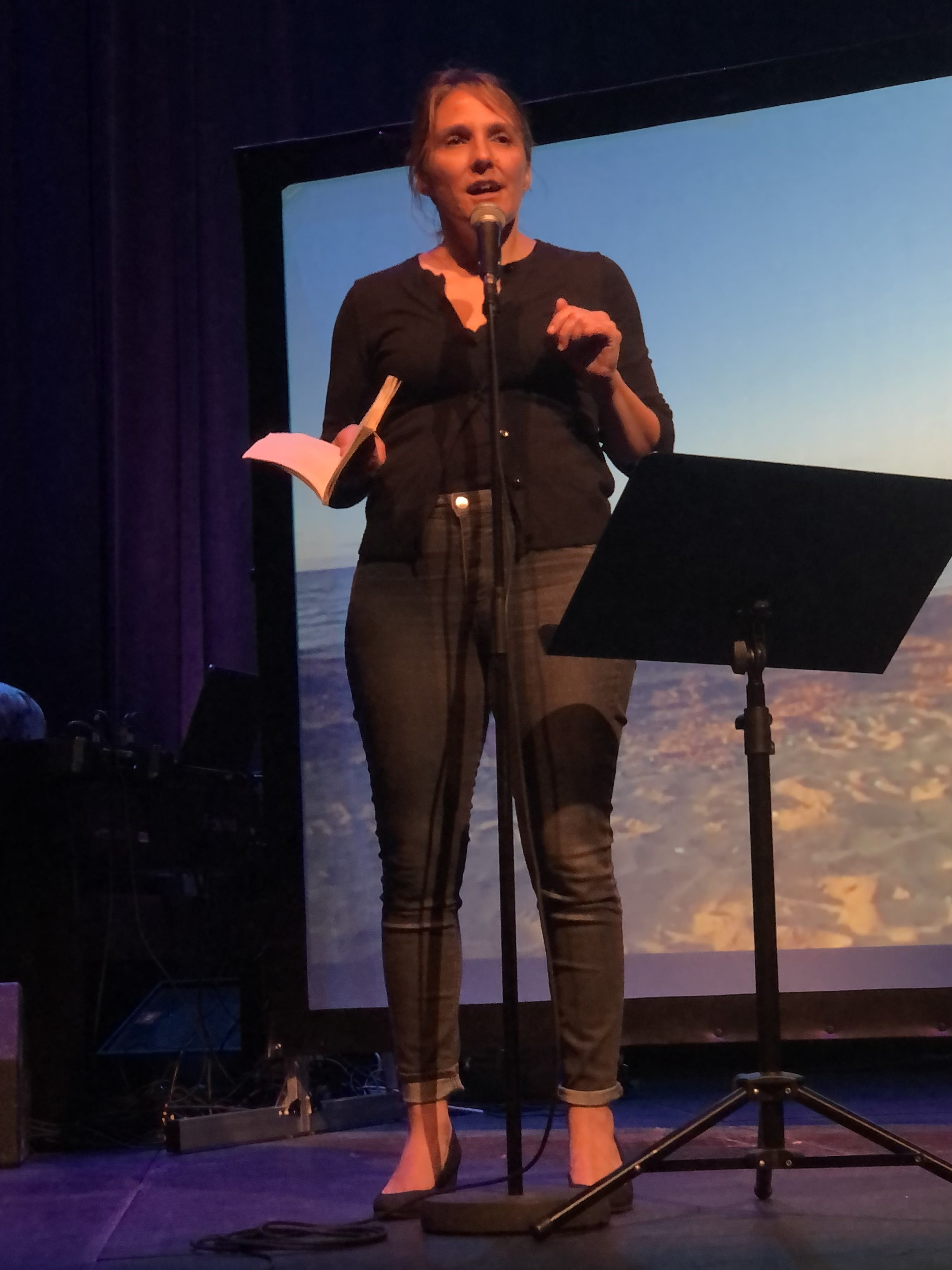
- Born: April 21, 1977 (age 49); Saint-Jean-sur-Richelieu, Quebec
- Occupations: poet, translator
- Writing career
- Notable works: Alma, Prudent

Georgette LeBlanc (born April 27, 1977) is a Canadian poet and translator, most noted for serving as the Canadian Parliamentary Poet Laureate in 2018 and 2019.

Born in Saint-Jean-sur-Richelieu, Quebec, and raised in Baie-Sainte-Marie, Nova Scotia, she was educated at Université Sainte-Anne and the University of Louisiana at Lafayette. Her first poetry collection, Alma, was published in 2006, and won the Prix Félix-Leclerc de la poésie in 2007.

She won the Governor General's Award for English to French translation at the 2020 Governor General's Awards for her translation of Susan Goyette's poetry collection Ocean. She was also previously nominated for the Governor General's Award for French-language poetry at the 2014 Governor General's Awards for her own poetry collection Prudent.

== Works ==
- Alma (2006)
- Amédé (2010)
- Prudent (2013)
- Le Grand Feu (2016)
- Petits poèmes sur mon père qui est mort (2022)
