= Kelley Aitken =

Canadian writer, visual artist, and art instructor

- Citizenship: Canadian
- Education: University of Guelph (B.F.A.)
- Occupations: Writer & Artist
- Notable work: Love in a Warm Climate

Kelley Aitken is a Canadian writer, visual artist, and art instructor.

== Biography ==
Aitken was born in Vancouver, British Columbia, and graduated from the University of Guelph with a degree in fine arts. Her first book, a collection of short stories entitled Love in a Warm Climate (1998), was short-listed for the 1999 Commonwealth Writers' Prize Best First Book Prize. Aitken co-edited, and contributed to, First Writes an anthology published in 2005.

Aitken lives in Toronto, Ontario.

== Bibliography ==
- Love in a Warm Climate. Erin, Ontario: Porcupine's Quill, 1998.
- First Writes. Banff, Alberta: Banff Centre, 2005. (edited with Susan Goyette and Barbara Scott)
