= Susan Goyette =

Canadian poet and novelist (born 1964)

- Born: 4 April 1964 (age 62); Sherbrooke, Quebec, Canada
- Writing career
- Notable awards: CBC Literary Award (2008)

Susan "Sue" Goyette (born 4 April 1964) is a Canadian poet and novelist.

== Biography ==
Born in Sherbrooke, Quebec, Goyette grew up in Saint-Bruno-de-Montarville, on Montreal's south shore.

Her first poetry book, The True Names of Birds (1998), was nominated for the 1999 Governor General's Award, the Pat Lowther Award and the Gerald Lampert Award. Goyette's first novel, Lures (2002), was nominated for the 2003 Thomas Head Raddall Award. She has also written another poetry collection, Undone (2004), and won the 2008 CBC Literary Award in poetry for the poem "Outskirts". The poetry collection of the same name, Outskirts, won the Atlantic Poetry Prize in 2012. Goyette's fourth poetry collection, Ocean, was published in 2013 by Gaspereau Press. Her fifth poetry collection, The Brief Reincarnation of a Girl, was published in 2015 by Gaspereau Press.

Goyette's collection Ocean is the recipient of the 2015 Lieutenant Governor of Nova Scotia Masterworks Arts Award, which recognizes the excellence of a particular work of art or design from any media and carries a cash value of $25,000.

Goyette has been a member of the faculty of The Maritime Writers' Workshop, The Banff Wired Studio, and The Sage Hill Writing Experience.

Goyette was a judge for the 2017 Griffin Poetry Prize.

== Personal life ==
She presently lives in Halifax, Nova Scotia, and teaches at Dalhousie University. In April 2020, she was named the city's eighth poet laureate.

Her stepson, Colin Munro, currently lives in the United Kingdom, where he performs as a drag queen under the name Crystal, and was a competitor in the first season of RuPaul's Drag Race UK.

== Awards and honours ==
Her 2020 poetry collection Anthesis was shortlisted for the ReLit Award for poetry in 2021, and Georgette LeBlanc's French translation of Goyette's Ocean won the Governor General's Award for English to French translation at the 2020 Governor General's Awards.

== Bibliography ==
- The True Names of Birds (Brick, 1998) ISBN 0-919626-99-8
- Lures (Harper Flamingo, 2002) ISBN 0-00-200506-9
- Undone (Brick, 2004) ISBN 1-894078-33-0
- First Writes (Banff Centre, 2005) ISBN 1-894773-16-0 (anthology edited with Kelley Aitken and Barbara Scott)
- Outskirts (Brick Books, 2011) ISBN 978-1-926829-68-5
- Ocean (Gaspereau Press, 2013) ISBN 978-1-554471-22-5 (shortlisted for the 2014 Griffin Poetry Prize)
- The Best Canadian Poetry in English, 2013 (Tightrope Books, 2013) ISBN 978-1926639666 (anthology guest editor)
- The Brief Reincarnation of a Girl (Gaspereau Press, 2015) ISBN 978-1554471461
- Penelope (Gaspereau Press, 2017) ISBN 978-1554471461
- Anthesis (2020)
