= Allan Stein =

1999 novel by Matthew Stadler

- Author: Matthew Stadler
- Language: English
- Publisher: Grove Press
- Publication date: December 6, 1999
- Publication place: United States
- Media type: Print (paperback)
- Pages: 272
- ISBN: 0802136621

Allan Stein is a 1999 novel by Matthew Stadler. Its epigraph is a quotation from writer Gertrude Stein: "What is the use of being a boy if you grow up to become a man, what is the use?"

The novel won the Lambda Literary Award for Gay Men's Fiction and the Richard and Hilda Rosenthal Foundation Award from the American Academy of Arts and Letters.

== Plot ==
In the novel's first section, the protagonist loses his teaching job due to a false accusation of seducing a 10th-grade student. He then seduces the student, and having done so, departs on a trip to France. In France he assumes the name of a friend, 'Herbert', and pretends to be a curator looking for lost drawings of Allan Stein.

The protagonist uses his new identity to become close to the son of his hosts, a moody 15-year-old named Stéphane. The narrator projects onto Stéphane an idealized memory of his own childhood, when he visited France with his mother at age 16, enchanted by Stéphane's mother as well as her son.

After two weeks, the narrator succeeds in making Stéphane his lover, and the two run off together to the South of France. But Stéphane returns to his parents when he discovers that the narrator has lied about his name. It is only at this point that the reader discovers the real name of the narrator: Matthew.

== Inspirations ==
Allan Stein was a real historical character: he was Gertrude Stein's nephew and the subject of a portrait by Pablo Picasso in 1906, when Allan was 11. On choosing this obscure figure as the subject of his book, Stadler has said, "Allan was a kid surrounded by powerful adults, and my work has always focused on kids living in the midst of adult projections."

In a 1999 interview, Stadler explained that this plot-turn offered him a way to look more closely at the relationship between an author and a fiction. He said that giving the fictional narrator his own first name left him "overwhelmed emotionally. I recognized that my inability to arrive at a right relation to these fantasies came from how nervous, hesitant, and defensive I felt about my presence as a writer of this. To have a character address me directly was very chastening."

This self-reckoning, he says, helped him conclude what had become a four-book inquiry. "I had been working for four books around this question, trying to achieve some kind of relation to the image of the boy. Allan Stein brought together so many strands of my work, I thought maybe I could neutron bomb the whole boy-mythology construct by somehow exhausting the territory of my fantasy."
