= Christopher Cook (Canadian writer) =

Canadian playwright

Christopher Cook is a Canadian playwright. They are most noted for the play Quick Bright Things, which was a Governor General's Award nominee for English-language drama at the 2020 Governor General's Awards.

Cook, who is non-binary, is based in Vancouver, British Columbia, where they also work as a counsellor for LGBTQ people.
