= Yeti (magazine) =

YETI magazine
- YETI FIVE
- Editor: Mike McGonigal
- Categories: Music, Culture
- Frequency: Non-standard
- Publisher: YETI Publishing
- Founded: 2000
- Country: United States
- Based in: Portland
- Language: English
- Website: yetipublishing.com

YETI is a journal focused on art, music and literature, based in Portland, Oregon. It is published by YETI Publishing, which has also published books by Lucy Sante, Tara Jane O'Neil and Jana Martin. YETI was founded in Seattle, Washington, by Mike McGonigal, author of the 33⅓ book on the My Bloody Valentine album Loveless, former editor of the '80s zine Chemical Imbalance, and a freelance writer (including contributions to Pitchfork). The magazine has featured various articles, interviews, artwork, poetry, novel excerpts, and more, from contributors including:

- Jeff Mangum
- Stacey Levine
- Amy Gerstler
- Dan Bejar
- Richard Thompson
- Harry Smith
- Akron/Family

Each magazine is packaged with a CD compilation, featuring rare and/or previously unreleased music. Musical contributors to the magazine have included:

- Iron and Wine (including their debut recording in YETI 1 and covers of Stereolab and The Flaming Lips in YETI 2.)
- Elliott Smith
- Death Cab for Cutie
- The Shins
- The Postal Service
- Devendra Banhart
- Destroyer
