= The Sex Offender =

1994 novel by Matthew Stadler

- Author: Matthew Stadler
- Language: English
- Genre: Fiction
- Publisher: HarperCollins
- Publication date: 1994
- Publication place: United States
- Media type: Print
- Pages: 206
- ISBN: 0060171073
- OCLC: 30031193
- Dewey Decimal: 813.54
- LC Class: PS3569.T149

The Sex Offender is a 1994 novel by Matthew Stadler. The book is strongly influenced by the theory of Michel Foucault on the links between state control of sex, health, and criminal behavior.

The Sex Offender chronicles the rehabilitation of a man (known as "Ollie Clews") who has had sex with a 12-year-old boy. He undergoes perverse forms of aversion therapy from the Orwellian Criminal and Health Ministry. Sessions involve watching pornographic movies while the offender's sexual arousal is measured and punishment administered. During these sessions, both the patient and his "Doctor-General" wear only bags over their heads.

Meanwhile, the offender begins visiting a forbidden night-club, lair of the drag queen Lucrezia, outlawed but idolized by pervert and politician alike. Lucrezia initiates the offender into a clandestine rebellion against the police state, and among the rebels he meets the child from the child pornography he watches in therapy.
