= Marie-Ève Lacasse =

French-Canadian writer

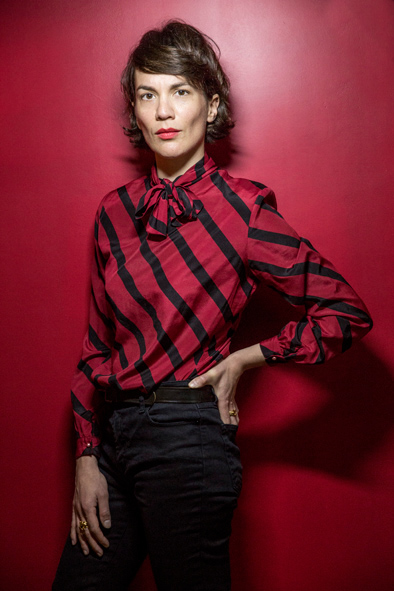
Marie-Ève Lacasse

Marie-Ève Lacasse (born May 24, 1982 in Hull, Quebec) is a Canadian writer. She is best known for her 2020 novel Autobiographie de l'étranger, which was shortlisted for the Governor General's Award for French-language fiction at the 2020 Governor General's Awards.
