= Stacey Levine =

American novelist

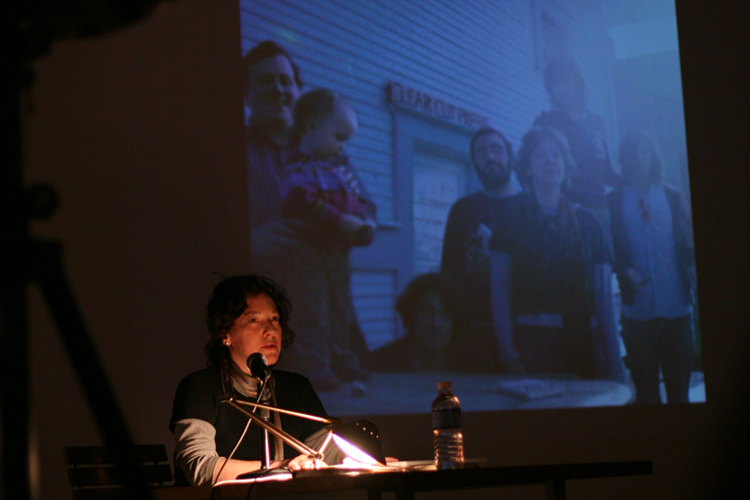
- Born: St. Louis, Missouri, USA
- Education: University of Missouri; University of Washington
- Occupations: novelist; short story author; journalist; college writing instructor
- Writing career
- Notable awards: Stranger Genius Award; PEN Literary Award for Fiction
- Website: www.staceylevine.com

Stacey Levine is an American novelist, short story author, and journalist. She has been called "one of the most interesting writers working in America today," "a gifted performance artist of literary fiction, part French existentialist and part comic bomb-thrower," and her writing has been described as "unlike anything else . . . vivid and preternaturally alert to the strangeness of the human condition." Reviewing her 2011 story collection The Girl with Brown Fur, Donna Seaman summed up Levine's writing thus:

Stacey Levine ignores lyricism as an evolutionary dead end. Life is fractious and dire, her prose style says; let fiction serve as razor and torch. It's not that Levine isn't funny or that she doesn't forge phrases and sentences of throat-clutching beauty. It's just that her effort to dissect humankind's propensity for neuroses, fallacies, and other inanities requires measured drollery and surgical concision.

== Biography ==
Born in St. Louis, Missouri, Levine attended the University of Missouri journalism school and the University of Washington. She has published three novels and two story collections, and her stories and criticism have appeared in numerous journals, including Fence, The Iowa Review, Tin House, Bookforum, The Brooklyn Rail, Nest: A Quarterly of Interiors, The Seattle Times, The Stranger, and YETI. She lives in Seattle, where she teaches at Seattle Central College.

== Career ==
Levine's debut story collection, My Horse and Other Stories, was published in 1993 by Sun & Moon Press, and won the 1994 PEN Literary Award for Fiction. “Levine's prose is compelling and intriguing and risky,” wrote the Review of Contemporary Fiction, while Exquisite Corpse noted: "Because something very similar to this once happened to you, you should read this book. There is a secret for your eyes only inside."

Levine's first novel, Dra— (Sun & Moon Press, 1997), “turns that most banal of activities, the search for a job, into a nightmarish pilgrimage of regression and lost selfhood.” It was praised as “both haunting and laugh-out-loud funny,” for its "beautiful, arresting prose," and for the author's ability to “put the emotional violence of human relations under a high‑power microscope.” Publishers Weekly claimed it combined “the dreamlike pace of Alice in Wonderland, the darkly comic tones of a Kafka novel, and a landscape reminiscent of 1984.”

Frances Johnson, Levine's second novel (Clear Cut Press, 2005), is set in Munson, a fictional Florida hamlet where “a volcano seethes on the outskirts of town, strange animals skitter in the shadows, and a dense brown fog has settled overhead. . . . The story follows Frances's mounting restlessness, as she must decide whether to take control of her life or cede it to the murky future the community has designated for her.” The Believer described the novel as “a comedy of manners,” and discerned “an inkling of Austen in Levine's delicate and deadpan assault on our culture's heterosexist, heterogeneous dictates. But the feel of the novel is more fanciful than programmatic," reviewer Jason McBride noted. "Each sentence operates in the same manner as the overarching narrative: shifting shape, defying expectation.”

A second story collection, The Girl with Brown Fur: Tales & Stories, was published in 2011 by Starcherone Books. In the Los Angeles Review of Books, reviewer Stephanie Barbe Hammer praised its “abundance of beautiful strangeness” and noted its formal range, from fairytale to metafiction to “prose-poem sketches,” observing that “the narrative language throughout . . . is crystalline and intensely elegant, often at comic odds with the terse speech of the characters themselves.” Couched within Levine's “strange fables,” wrote Kristy Eldredge, are “recognizable hurts and self-defeating desires. The way she writes about such things is what makes her fiction the elegant, precise and transcendent wonderland it is.”

Reviewing Levine's third novel, Mice 1961 (Verse Chorus Press, 2024), in the Washington Post, Lydia Millet highlighted “something singular to Levine's writing: a brilliant chemistry of alienation and familiarity I've never seen anywhere else” that elicited from her “a startled, delighted laughter.” Alvin Lu called it “a subtly observed novel of manners, a cross between Jane Bowles and Jane Austen” couched in “remarkable language,” while Garielle Lutz has stated that “Mice 1961 is as enchanting a novel—and as excitingly original, as tunefully phrased, and as discomposingly hilarious—as anything I can ever hope to read. Few writers are ever this alive to language and this tender toward the lot of the vividly different among us. I am in awe.”

Levine has collaborated with graphic novelist David Lasky on comics projects, and with illustrator Chuk Baldock, with whom she published the chapbook JFK vs. Predator in 2023. In addition she has written a radio play, The Post Office (1996), with music composed by Lori Goldston, and a one-act play, Susan Moneymaker, Large and Small, which was published as a chapbook by the Brooklyn-based Belladonna Series and produced in Seattle. She also wrote the libretto for a puppet opera, The Wreck of the St. Nikolai, with music by Lori Goldston (cello) and Kyle Hanson (accordion) and mis-en-scene by Eve Cohen and Curtis Taylor, which was staged in Seattle by On the Boards in 2006.

== Awards and recognition ==
Levine received a Stranger Genius Award for Literature in 2009, and two of her books have been finalists for the Washington State Book Award in Fiction. She has received a PEN Literary Award for Fiction and various writing grants and fellowships.

Her novel Mice 1961 was a finalist for the 2025 Pulitzer Prize for Fiction.

== Works ==
=== Novels ===
- Dra—. Los Angeles: Sun & Moon Press. 1997. ISBN 9781557132888. New edition: Portland, Oregon: Verse Chorus Press. 2011. ISBN 9781891241314.
- Frances Johnson. Astoria, WA: Clear Cut Press. 2005. ISBN 9780972323468. New edition: Portland, Oregon: Verse Chorus Press. 2010. ISBN 9781891241291.
- Mice 1961. Portland, OR: Verse Chorus Press. 2024. ISBN 9781959163015..

=== Story collections ===
- My Horse and Other Stories. Los Angeles: Sun & Moon Press. 1994. ISBN 9781557131249.
- The Girl with Brown Fur: Tales & Stories. Buffalo, NY: Starcherone. 2011. ISBN 9780984213344.

=== Chapbooks ===
- Susan Moneymaker, Large and Small (one-act play). Brooklyn, NY: Belladonna*. 2005.
- He Wanted All Galenans to Know He Was Real. New York: Louffa Press. 2013.
- JFK vs. Predator (with illustrations by Chuk Baldock). Seattle, WA: New Pacific Press. 2022.

=== Spoken Word ===
- 'Sweethearts' (split 7-inch single). Kill Rock Stars (Wordcore Vol. 2). 1991. KRS-102.
