= Matt Briggs =

American novelist and short story writer

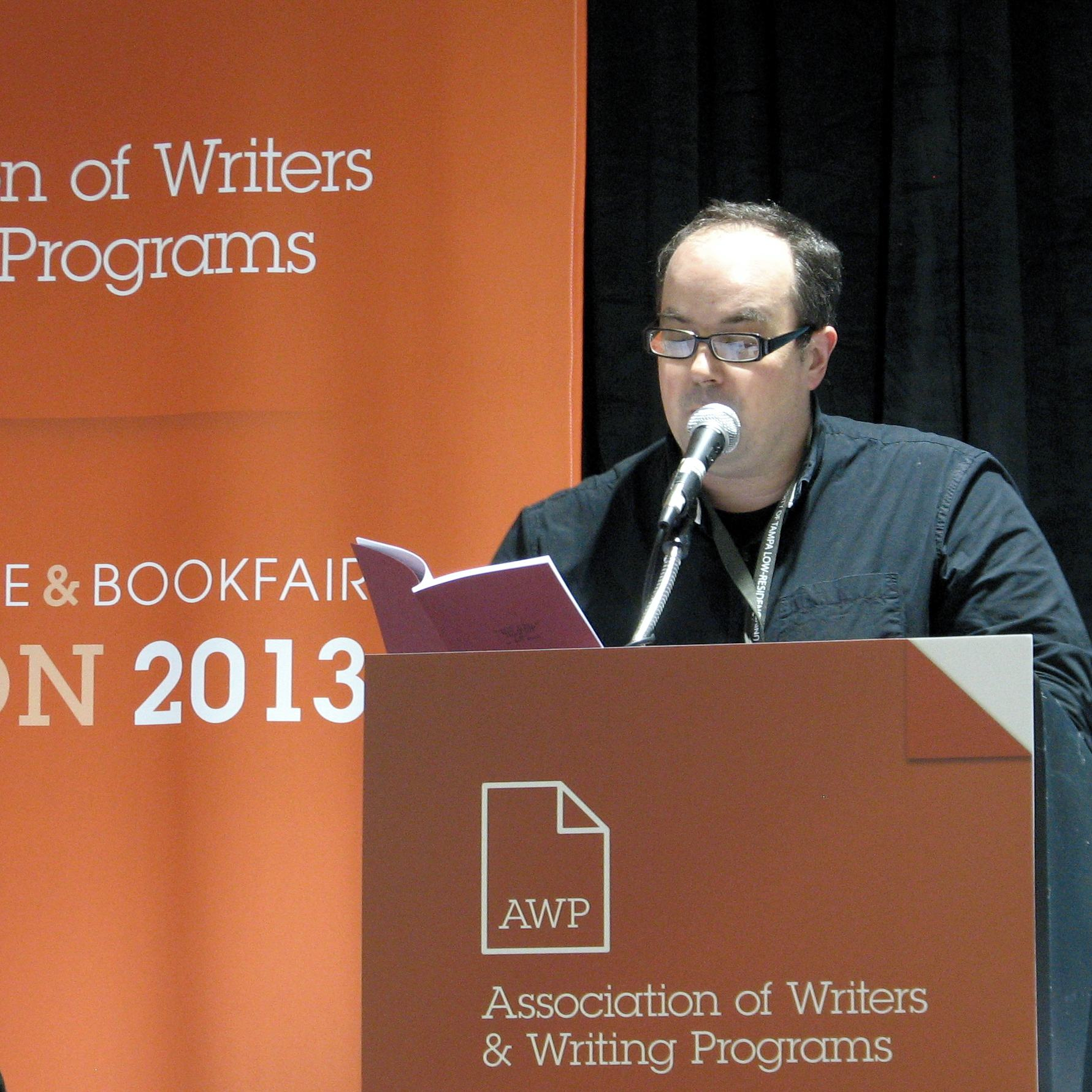
- Matt Briggs reading from the Publication Studio edition of his book, Virility Rituals of North American Teenage Boys at the Associated Writing Conference in Boston on Saturday March 9, 2013.
- Born: 1970 (age 55–56); Seattle, Washington, U.S.
- Occupation: Writer
- Writing career
- Genre: Literature

Matt Briggs (born 1970) is an American novelist and short story writer.

== Biography ==
Matt Briggs was born in Seattle, Washington, which he still calls home. He grew up in the Snoqualmie Valley raised by working-class, counter-culture parents who cultivated and sold cannabis. Briggs has written two books set in rural Washington chronicling this life. Critic Ann Powers wrote of Briggs first book in the New York Times Book Review, "Briggs has captured the America that neither progressives nor family-value advocates want to think about, where bohemianism has degenerated into dangerous dropping out."

After high school Briggs joined the US Army Reserve and his unit was deployed to the Gulf War. Briggs served as a laboratory technician in Riyadh, Saudi Arabia. This experience became the basis for his novel The Strong Man. After he returned to the States, where he studied writing at the University of Washington and at the Writing Seminars at Johns Hopkins University. He returned to the Seattle area where he continues to live.

He has been involved with zines, literary magazines, and performance series. He worked as an editor at The Raven Chronicles from 1997 to 2003. He produced The Rendezvous Reading Series from 2001 - 2003. Briggs served as The Writer in Residence at Richard Hugo House from 2003 to 2005 where he has taught writing classes for the chronically ill at Gilda's Club and the Polyclinic, a zine class to teenagers in Redmond, Washington, produced literary events, and offered open hours to the community. In April, 2005, Clear Cut Press editor Matthew Stadler and Briggs organized the Unassociated Writers Conference and Dance Party as "part party, part architectural experiment, part performance, part song and dance," the conference promoted an alternative literary culture of zines, micro presses and project-based publishing." In 2007, Briggs curated the Jack Straw Writers series.

Briggs' first two book-length works of fiction, The Remains of River Names, a collection of linked stories, and the novel, Shoot the Buffalo, belong in the tradition of Pacific Northwest Literature and echo earlier work such as The Honey in the Horn by HL Davis, Sometimes a Great Notion by Ken Kesey, and The Egg and I by Betty MacDonald. Writer Ray Mungo wrote of Briggs’ work, "Briggs as the language, cadence, and rain-shrouded soul of the Northwest honed to perfection in his candid and haunting style." Shoot the Buffalo won a 2006 American Book Award and was a Finalist for the 2006 Washington State Book Award in Fiction.

In addition, Briggs was awarded a Genius Award for literature from The Stranger, a weekly newspaper in Seattle. He has published work in magazines, including 5_Trope, The Clackamas Review, The Seattle Review and Zyzzyva, and has performed at Bumbershoot and What the Heck Fest.

== Works ==
- The Remains of River Names (Black Heron Press, 1999)
- Misplaced Alice (StringTown Press, 2002)
- The Moss Gatherers (StringTown Press, 2005)
- Shoot the Buffalo, a novel (Clear Cut Press, 2005)
- The End is the Beginning (Final State Press, 2008)
- "The Strong Man" (Publication Studio, 2010)
- "The Double E" (Publication Studio, 2013)
- "Virility Rituals of North American Teenage Boys" (Publication Studio, 2013)

== Reviews ==
- Shoot the Buffalo: A life in Northwest haunted by death of sister, review in The Seattle Times
- Review in Portland Mercury
- Northwest Energy: Reservoir Bumping with Matt Briggs by Rebecca Brown in The Stranger
- Grunge Novel by Ann Powers in The New York Times Book Review
