= Michel Cassé =

French astrophysicist, writer and poet

Michel Cassé, is a French astrophysicist, writer and poet born in Fleurance in Gers in 1943. He works at CEA (Commissariat à l'énergie atomique), and at French National Centre for Scientific Research (CNRS) and specializes nucleosynthesis and quantum mechanics.

== Publications ==
- Stellar Alchemy: The Celestial Origin of Atoms, 2003 with Stephen Lyle ISBN 978-0-521-82182-7
- Astrophysique (in French), 2011, éditions Jean-Paul Bayol, ISBN 978-2-916913-33-9
- Nostalgie de la Lumière (in French), Belfond, ISBN 978-2-7144-2099-2
- Les Trous noirs en pleine lumière (in French), 2009, Odile Jacob, ISBN 978-2-7381-2077-9
- Cosmologie dite à Rimbaud (in French), 2007, éditions Jean-Paul Bayol, ISBN 978-2-916913-05-6
- Théories du ciel. Espace perdu, temps retrouvé (in French), 2005, Rivages, ISBN 2-7436-1421-8
- Énergie noire, matière noire (in French), 2004, Odile Jacob, ISBN 2-7381-1325-7
- Du vide et de la création (in French), 2001, Odile Jacob, ISBN 2-7381-0976-4
- Généalogie de la matière. Retour aux sources célestes des éléments 2000 (in French), Odile Jacob, ISBN 2-7381-0846-6
