= Thomas Sieverts =

German architect and urban planner (born 1934)

Thomas Sieverts (born 8 June 1934) is a German architect and urban planner. He is the author of Zwischenstadt (1997; first published in English in 2000 as Cities without Cities: An interpretation of the Zwischenstadt), a book which addresses the decentralization of the compact historical European city and examines the new form of urbanity which has spread across the world describable as the urbanised landscape or the landscaped city. Sieverts calls this the Zwischenstadt, or "in-between city", as it exists between old historical city centres and open countrysides, between place as a living space and the non-places of movement, between small local economic cycles and the dependency on the world market. In 2008 a group calling itself "suddenly" commissioned the American writer Diana George to make a new translation of Zwischenstadt which they published as Where We Live Now (the English phrase George chose as the translation of Sieverts's neologism "Zwischenstadt"). In October 2008, Sieverts came to Portland, Oregon, on the occasion of the book's publication to take part in a week-long symposium about his work, also called suddenly.

== Career ==
Sieverts studied architecture and urban design in Stuttgart, Liverpool, and Berlin between 1955 and 1962. He became an assistant lecturer at Technische Universität Berlin. In 1965 he formed the "Freie Planungsgruppe Berlin", becoming Professor of Urban Design at the Berlin University of the Arts, between 1967 and 1970. He was briefly a guest professor in the Urban Design Program at the Graduate School of Design, Harvard University, Cambridge, Massachusetts. He was the Professor of Urban Design at the Technische Universität Darmstadt from 1971 to 1999, and worked also as a professor at the School of Town Planning, University of Nottingham, from 1984 to 1989. He served as Scientific Director for the International Building Exhibition (IBA), Emscher Park, Gelsenkirchen from 1989 to 1994, and Fellow at the Institute of Advanced Studies, Berlin from 1995 to 1996.

He is a partner in S.K.A.T., Architekten und Stadtplaner, which began in 2000.

== Projects ==
- 1987 Construction of housing estate in Aschaffenburg, Germany.
- 1990 Reconstruction of a large area of housing in Ingolstadt, Germany.
- 1995 Community house for the socially problematic Dammans Hof housing estate, Harsewinkel, Germany.
- 1997 Bochum West Park
- 1997 Redevelopment of the problem housing estate at Dransdorf, Bonn, Germany.
- 1998 Housing estate in Berlin-Karow, Germany.
- 1998 Nordstern mine at Gelsenkirchen, Germany.
- From 2000 Framework planning in the field of urban development, for new estates in Frankfurt (Oder) and northern Erfurt, Germany.
- 2003 New design for the high-rise development at Dransdorf, Bonn, Germany.

== Awards ==
- 1969 Deubau Prize (with Egbert Kossak and Herbert Zimmermann)
- 1995 German Urban Development Award, award for exemplary buildings in North Rhine-Westphalia
- 2003 Award for good buildings from BDA Bochum, Hattingen, Herne, Witten for the overall project in Bochum West Park
- 2007 Member of the architecture section of the Academy of Arts, Berlin.
- 2010 Honorary doctorate from the Technical University of Braunschweig
- 2014 Ernst Schumacher Prize of the Senate of the Free and Hanseatic City of Hamburg
