= Charles D'Ambrosio =

American short story writer and essayist

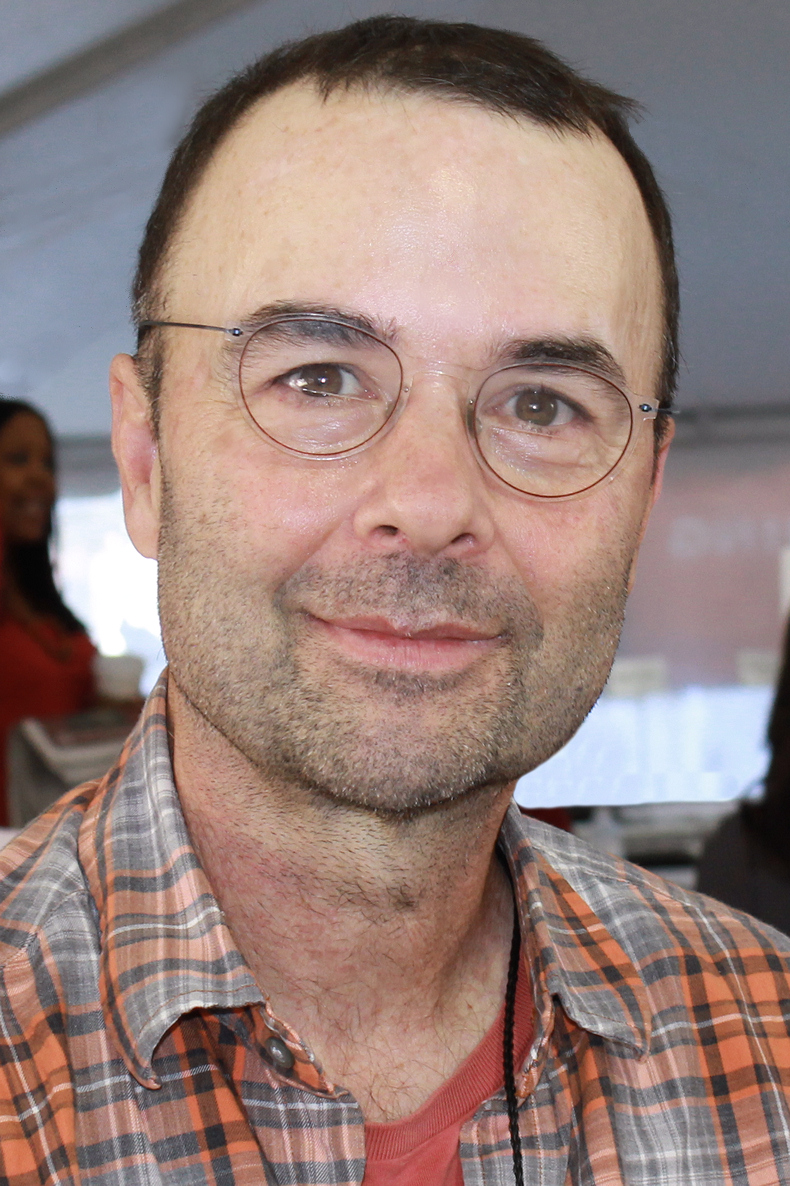
- D'Ambrosio at the 2015 Texas Book Festival
- Born: Seattle, Washington
- Education: Oberlin College (BA); University of Iowa (MFA)
- Occupation: Author

Charles Anthony D'Ambrosio, Jr (born 1958) is an American short story writer and essayist.

== Life ==
The son of Charles D'Ambrosio, Sr (1932-2011), a professor of finance at the University of Washington, D'Ambrosio grew up with two brothers and four sisters in Seattle, Washington. He attended Oberlin College and graduated from the Iowa Writers Workshop, where he is currently on faculty. Previously, D'Ambrosio was on the faculty of Portland State University's MFA Program in Creative Writing, and has also been a visiting instructor at the Tin House Summer Writers Workshop and the Warren Wilson MFA Program for Writers. In 2005 he married writer and musician Heather Larimer; the two divorced in 2008.

D'Ambrosio is the author of two collections of short stories, The Point (1995) and The Dead Fish Museum (2006). He has also published a collection of essays Orphans (2005). His writings have appeared in The New Yorker, The Stranger (newspaper), The Paris Review, Zoetrope All-Story, and A Public Space. His newest book, Loitering is a collection of essays from Tin House Books.

Little Brown published D'Ambrosio's first short story collection, The Point in 1995. The collection was a finalist for the Hemingway Foundation/PEN Award and was a New York Times Notable Book of the Year.

Orphans, a collection of essays, was published in 2005 by Clear Cut Press. The book, which gained something of a cult status, sold out of its small-print run and was never reprinted. Ten years after his first collection, The Point, Knopf published his second book of fiction, The Dead Fish Museum. Six of the eight stories in the collection were originally published in The New Yorker. The book was a finalist for the PEN/Faulkner Award. In October 2006, D'Ambrosio was awarded the prestigious Whiting Award. Among other honors, he has received an Academy Award from the American Academy of Arts and Letters, a Lannan Foundation Fellowship, and is presently a USA Rasmuson Fellow. The Rasmuson Fellowship earned him a $50,000 grant from United States Artists, a relatively new organization that supports and promotes the work of American artists in a variety of disciplines.

The Dead Fish Museum won the 2007 Washington State Book Award for Fiction.

== Works ==
=== Short story collections ===
- The Point (1995)
  - The Point, originally published in The New Yorker, 1990-10-01.
  - Her Real Name, originally published in The Paris Review, Spring 1993.
  - American Bullfrog
  - Jacinta, originally published in Story
  - All Aboard, originally published in The Cimarron Review
  - Lyricism, originally published in Story (as A Christmas Carol)
  - Open House, originally published in The Paris Review, Winter 1994.
- The Dead Fish Museum (2006)
  - The High Divide, originally published in The New Yorker, 2003-02-03.
  - Drummond & Son, originally published in The New Yorker, 2002-10-07.
  - Screenwriter, originally published in The New Yorker, 2003-12-08.
  - Up North, originally published in The New Yorker, 2005-02-14.
  - The Scheme of Things, originally published in The New Yorker, 2004-10-11.
  - The Dead Fish Museum, originally published in A Public Space, Spring 2005.
  - Blessing, originally published in Zoetrope: All-Story, Winter 2005.
  - The Bone Game, originally published in The New Yorker, 2006-03-06.

=== Essay collections ===
- Orphans (2005)
  - Documents, originally published in The New Yorker, 2002-06-17.
- Loitering (2014)

=== Uncollected short stories and essays ===
- The Allegorical Tourist: Jonathan Raban Straddles a Sea and Its Meanings, published in The Stranger, 1999-12-09.
- Train in Vain, published in The New Yorker, 2004-06-14.
- Summer of '42, published in The New Yorker, 2007-06-11.

== Reviews ==
...in the last few years, writers in this book review have lamented the decline of slice-of-life realism, pronouncing it dead at least once. But pronouncing things dead is the job of critics, and the truth is that understated realism remains a robust tradition, as evidenced by the work of, among others, Charles D'Ambrosio, whose stories frequently appear in The New Yorker. Eleven years after the publication of his first book, "The Point," and one year after his book of essays, "Orphans," along comes "The Dead Fish Museum," which largely traverses the same Carveresque territory staked out in his debut: the charged relationships between fathers and sons, drifters and workers, in the outskirts of the American Northwest.
