= Joseph-Henri-Gustave Lacasse =

Canadian politician

The Honourable Joseph-Henri-Gustave Lacasse
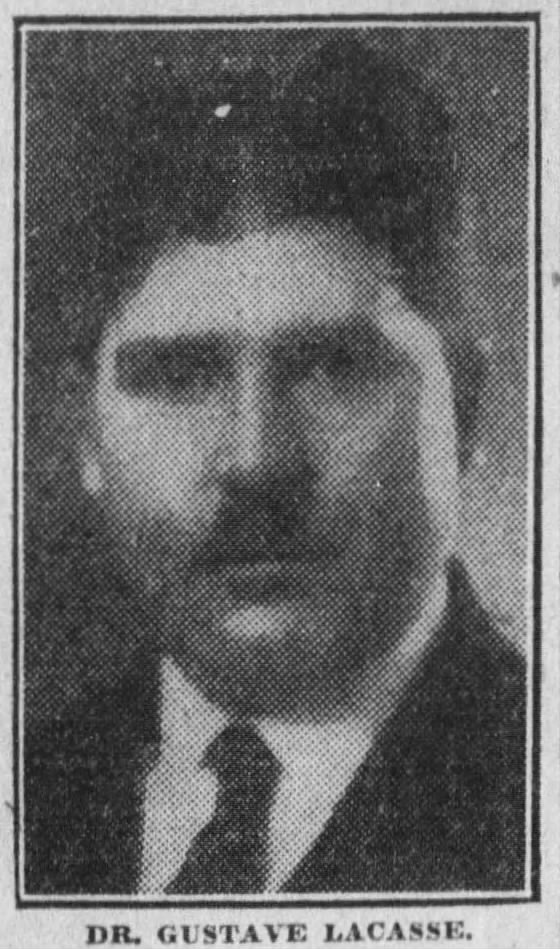

Canadian Senator from Ontario
- In office 1928–1953
- Appointed by: William Lyon Mackenzie King

Personal details
- Born: February 7, 1890 Ste-Élisabeth de Joliette, Quebec, Canada
- Died: January 18, 1953 (aged 62)
- Party: Liberal

Joseph-Henri-Gustave Lacasse (February 7, 1890 – January 18, 1953) was a journalist, physician and political figure in Ontario, Canada. He sat for Essex division in the Senate of Canada from 1928 to 1953.

== Background ==
He was born in Sainte-Élisabeth-de-Joliette, Quebec, the son of François-Xavier-Onésime Lacasse and Annie Gernon, and was educated at the Petit Séminaire de Montréal and the Université Laval. He interned in medicine at Windsor and set up practice in Tecumseh. Lacasse spoke out strongly against Regulation 17, which limited Francophone education in Ontario. He became known as "the lion of the peninsula" for his spirited opposition to this legislation. Lacasse served on the town council of Tecumseh and was mayor from 1927 to 1928. He was married twice: to Marie-Anne Saint-Pierre in 1915 and to Marie Rose Lucienne Sasseville-Guilmant in 1948. Lacasse was founder and editor of three weekly journals: La Défense, La Presse-Frontière and La Feuille d'Érable. In 1952, he founded Imprimerie Lacasse at Tecumseh. Lacasse was named to the Canadian senate at the age of 37 and died in office 25 years later.

In 1944, Lacasse was reproved in the rabies fatality of an 11-year-old boy. Appointed medical health officer and acting as physician to the family, Lacasse did not administer the Pasteur treatment when the boy was bitten by a rabid dog. A coroner's jury criticized Lacasse for showing "a certain amount of neglect by not administering preventive treatment for rabies when the unknown dog could not be found within 14 days after occurrence of the bite."
