= Lisa Robertson (writer) =

Canadian poet, essayist and translator (born 1961)

- Born: July 22, 1961 (age 65); Toronto, Ontario, Canada
- Education: Simon Fraser University (attended)
- Occupations: Poet, essayist, novelist, translator
- Writing career
- Language: English
- Period: 1990s–present
- Notable works: The Weather (2001); Occasional Work and Seven Walks from the Office for Soft Architecture (2003); The Baudelaire Fractal (2020); Boat (2022)
- Notable awards: ReLit Award for poetry (2002); bpNichol Chapbook Award (2006); C.D. Wright Award for Poetry (2018)

Lisa Robertson (born July 22, 1961) is a Canadian poet, essayist and translator. She lives in France.

== Early life ==
Born in Toronto, Ontario, Robertson moved to British Columbia in 1979, first living on Saltspring Island, then in Vancouver, where studied English literature and art history as a mature student at Simon Fraser University (1984–1988) before leaving the university without a degree to become an independent bookseller (1988–1994). She owned Proprioception Books, a bookstore in downtown Vancouver specializing in poetry, theory and criticism, where she also hosted readings. During the 90s, she was also a member of The Kootenay School of Writing, which was a writer-run collective, and Artspeak Gallery. She began to publish and work collectively in this community of poets and artists. Her first book was a chapbook, The Apothecary, published by Tsunami Editions in 1991. Since then she has published nine books of poetry, three books of essays, and two novels.

== Career ==
=== Teaching and residencies ===
Since 1995 she has been a freelance writer and teacher, occasionally working as a writer in residence or visiting professor in various universities in Canada, the US and the UK. Her first such position was as Judith E. Wilson Visiting Fellow in Poetry, at Cambridge University in 1999. During that time she completed the research that resulted in her book The Weather (2001), which has since been translated to French, Polish and Swedish.

In 2006, Robertson was a judge of the Griffin Poetry Prize and Holloway poet-in-residence at UC Berkeley. From 2007 to 2010 she taught as visiting professor at California College of the Arts in San Francisco. In fall 2010 she was writer-in-residence at Simon Fraser University in Vancouver. In spring 2014 she was the Bain Swigget lecturer in Poetry at Princeton University.

=== Poetry, essays and translations ===
Her many essays on the contemporary visual arts, published in gallery and museum catalogues since the mid-1990s, are collected in her 2003 book Occasional Works and Seven Walks from the Office for Soft Architecture.

Anemones: A Simone Weil Project, her 2021 book, contains Robertson's translations of Simone Weil's 1941 essay "What the Occitan Inspiration Consists Of" and the 12th C poem "Lark" by Bernart de Ventadorn, as well as extensive annotations, an introductory essay, and archival material.

Her poetry collection Boat, a long poem extended and republished once each decade since 2003, when it began as a chapbook called Rousseau's Boat (Nomados Press), was shortlisted for the 2023 Pat Lowther Award.

=== Novels ===
Her first novel, The Baudelaire Fractal, was published by Coach House Books in January 2020. It was a finalist for the ReLit Award for fiction in 2021, and for the Governor General's Award for English-language fiction at the 2020 Governor General's Awards. It was published in Jeannot Clair's French translation by Le Quartanier, in 2023, as well as in Swedish, by OEI.

Riverwork, her second novel, was published by Coach House Books in 2026. Her novel Riverwork was longlisted for the 2026 Giller Prize.

== Legacy ==
Her literary archive is housed at Simon Fraser University Library's Special Collections.

== Awards and honours ==
=== Awards ===
- 2002 – ReLit Award for poetry for The Weather.
- 2006 – bpNichol Chapbook Award for Rousseau's Boat.
- 2018 – Inaugural C.D. Wright Award for Poetry from the Foundation for Contemporary Arts.

=== Shortlists ===
- 1998 – Governor General's Award for English-language poetry for Debbie: An Epic.
- 2020 – Governor General's Award for English-language fiction for The Baudelaire Fractal.
- 2021 – ReLit Award for The Baudelaire Fractal.
- 2023 – Pat Lowther Award for Boat.

=== Longlists ===
- 2026 – Giller Prize for Riverwork.

=== Honorary degrees ===
- 2017 – Honorary doctorate in letters from Emily Carr University of Art and Design.

== Works ==
=== Poetry ===
- The Apothecary. Vancouver: Tsunami Editions, 1991. Reissued in 2001 and by BookThug in 2007.
- XEclogue II–V. Vancouver: Sprang Texts, 1993.
- XEclogue. Vancouver: Tsunami Editions, 1993. Reissued by New Star Books in 1999.
- Debbie: An Epic. Vancouver: New Star Books, 1997. Also published in the United Kingdom by Reality Street in 1997.
- The Weather. Vancouver: New Star Books, 2001. Also published in the United Kingdom by Reality Street in 2001.
  - French edition: Le Temps, translated by Éric Suchère. Caen: Éditions Nous, 2016.
  - Swedish edition: Vädret, translated by Niclas Nilsson. Malmö: Rámus, 2017.
- Rousseau's Boat. Vancouver: Nomados, 2004.
- First Spontaneous Horizontal Restaurant. Belladonna 75. Brooklyn: Belladonna Books, 2005.
- The Men: A Lyric Book. Toronto: BookThug, 2006.
- Lisa Robertson's Magenta Soul Whip. Toronto: Coach House Books, 2009.
- R's Boat. Berkeley: University of California Press, 2010.
- Cinema of the Present. Toronto: Coach House Books, 2014.
- 3 Summers. Toronto: Coach House Books, 2016.
- Starlings. San Francisco: Krupskaya, 2018.
- Boat. Toronto: Coach House Books, 2022.

=== Novels ===
- The Baudelaire Fractal. Toronto: Coach House Books, 2020.
- Riverwork. Toronto: Coach House Books, 2026.

=== Essays and criticism ===
- The Glove: An Essay on Interpretation. Vancouver: UBC Fine Arts Gallery, 1993.
- Soft Architecture: A Manifesto. Vancouver: Artspeak Gallery, 1999.
- Occasional Work and Seven Walks from the Office for Soft Architecture. Astoria, Oregon: Clear Cut Press, 2003.
- Nilling: Prose. Toronto: BookThug, 2012.
- Thresholds: A Prosody of Citizenship. London: Book Works, 2019.

==== Selected essays ====
- "How Pastoral: A Manifesto". In A Poetics of Criticism, edited by Juliana Spahr. Buffalo: Leave Books, 1994.
- "The Weather: A Report on Sincerity". In DC Poetry Anthology 2001.
- "Coasting", with Jeff Derksen, Nancy Shaw and Catriona Strang. In Telling It Slant: Avant-Garde Poetics of the 1990s, edited by Mark Wallace. Tuscaloosa: University of Alabama Press, 2002.
- "My Eighteenth Century". In Assembling Alternatives, edited by Romana Huk. Middletown, Connecticut: Wesleyan University Press, 2003.
- "On Palinode". Chicago Review, 51(4)/52(1), 2006.
- "Notes, Murmurations: The Notebook as Form of Rime". Draught, 2025.

=== Translation projects ===
- Anemones: A Simone Weil Project. Amsterdam: If I Can't Dance, 2021. Includes Robertson's translations of an essay by Simone Weil and a poem by Bernart de Ventadorn, with an introductory essay, annotations and archival material.

=== Other publications ===
- The Barscheit Horse, with Catriona Strang and Christine Stewart. Hamilton, Ontario: Berkeley Horse, 1993.
- The Badge. Hamilton, Ontario: The Berkeley Horse/Mindware, 1994.
- Earth Monies. Mission, British Columbia: DARD, 1995.
- The Descent. Buffalo: Meow, 1996.
- A Hotel. Vancouver: Vancouver Film School, 2003.
- Face/. New York: A Rest Press, 2003.
- Proverbs of a She-Dandy. Paris and Vancouver: Libraries Editeurs, 2018.

== See also ==
- Canadian literature
- Canadian poetry
- List of Canadian poets
