= Joseph Lacasse =

French painter (1894–1975)

- Born: Joseph Lacasse; 5 August 1894; Tournai, Belgium
- Died: 26 October 1975 (aged 81); Paris, France
- Known for: Painting
- Movement: Abstraction

Joseph Lacasse (1894,Tournai–1975, Paris) was a Belgian artist who enjoyed a career that spanned some sixty-five years, during which he stood at the helm of Abstraction.

== Early years ==
Born in Tournai, Belgium in 1894 in a working-class family, Lacasse started his apprenticeship to become a painter-decorator as early as 1905. He was accepted the following year as a free student at the Ecole des Beaux Arts of Tournai where he continued his training until 1921. As a young boy, Lacasse worked alongside his father as a stone-cutter in a local quarry. His abstract pastels, dated 1910, were painted after a day of hard work, where the austere structure of the quarry fired his imagination. These early pastels are completely geometrical, though not symmetrical, and their aggressive shapes are softened by rounded lines. They are dominated by a powerful black construction, traced with great surety.

After surviving the First World War, Lacasse became a successful painter of figurative scenes illustrating the condition of the working classes, often depicted against a religious background. Following a trip to South Italy in 1921, where he painted his ‘motherhood’ series, always in a style of emphasized realism, he decided to enroll at the Académie Royale des Beaux-Arts, Brussels where Lacasse met his future wife, Stephanie Lupsin, daughter of the renowned art dealer.

== The First Paris Period ==
Following several travels to Italy, Brittany and Spain, Lacasse finally decided to settle in Paris in 1925. Here, his acquaintance with Robert Delaunay was crucial to his colouristic development. During this period he also became friend with neighbouring Constantin Brâncuși and the writers Robert Garric and Henry Poulaille. Throughout the thirties, Lacasse turned to Abstraction for consolation from the disillusionment over the painting and the forced removal of his frescoes at the Dominican Chapel at Juvisy during 1931-32.

In 1933 Lacasse founded the gallery L’Equipe inspired by his socialist ideas that artists of all disciplines should come together to exchange ideas and to fight for the right to be shown. The gallery played an important role on the Parisian art scene with exhibitions showing the works of many including Jacques Lipchitz, Moïse Kisling, Francis Picabia and Pablo Picasso. Lacasse himself had a one-man show at L’Equipe in 1937 during which he showed some of his abstract work. Lacasse’s coloristic developments of the time also testify his great admiration for Robert Delaunay whom, according to Michel Seuphor, he met in 1931 and whose gatherings at his studio Lacasse attended during 1938 and 1939. Other artists he met included Serge Poliakoff, who then started visiting L'Equipe. At the time of their meeting Poliakoff was still committed to figuration. In 1939 L'Equipe published its first three magazines.

== The Second World War ==
At the outbreak of the Second World War, Lacasse decided to join General de Gaulle’s Resistance by moving to London with the Free French Forces. During the five years of wars Lacasse seemed to have put aside painting while teaching sculpture and ceramics in Stoke-on-Trent. During this period he was totally cut off from his family.

== The Second Paris Period ==
His absence from Paris cost him dearly for the Parisian artistic community had continued without him. In a moment of depression, he destroyed more than a hundred paintings. Having become a French citizen in 1946, Lacasse, encouraged by his wife and friends, went back to painting. Until his death in 1975, Lacasse’s work became the subject of countless exhibitions abroad including UK, Germany and the USA.
