= Aaron Peck (writer) =

Canadian writer and educator (born 1979)

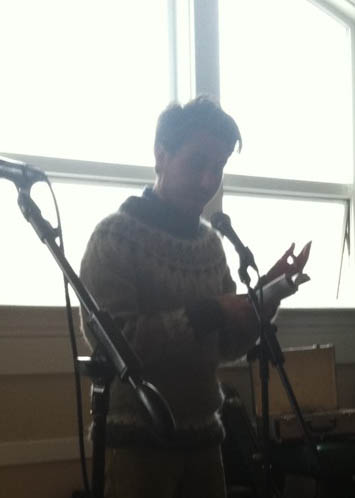
- Writer Aaron Peck reading in Anacortes, WA in July 2011
- Born: 1979 (age 46–47); Prince Albert, Saskatchewan, Canada
- Occupation: writer

Aaron Peck is a Canadian writer and educator.

He is the author of the novella The Bewilderments of Bernard Willis, published by Pedlar Press in 2008, and an art book, Letters to the Pacific, published by Publication Studio in 2010. In 2016, Peck authored the monograph Jeff Wall: North & West, which was nominated for the Melva J. Dwyer Award in the same year.

Peck's criticism has appeared in Frieze, The New York Review of Books Daily, The White Review, Art Agenda, Artforum, Art Papers, Canadian Art, and Fillip.

He is a lecturer at the Emily Carr University of Art and Design in Vancouver, where he won the Ian Wallace Excellence in Teaching award in 2011.

In 2012, Peck was selected to take part in the writers residency at dOCUMENTA in Kassel, Germany.

From 2002 to 2009, Peck was the assistant editor at Greenboathouse Books.
