= Maureen Hynes =

Canadian poet

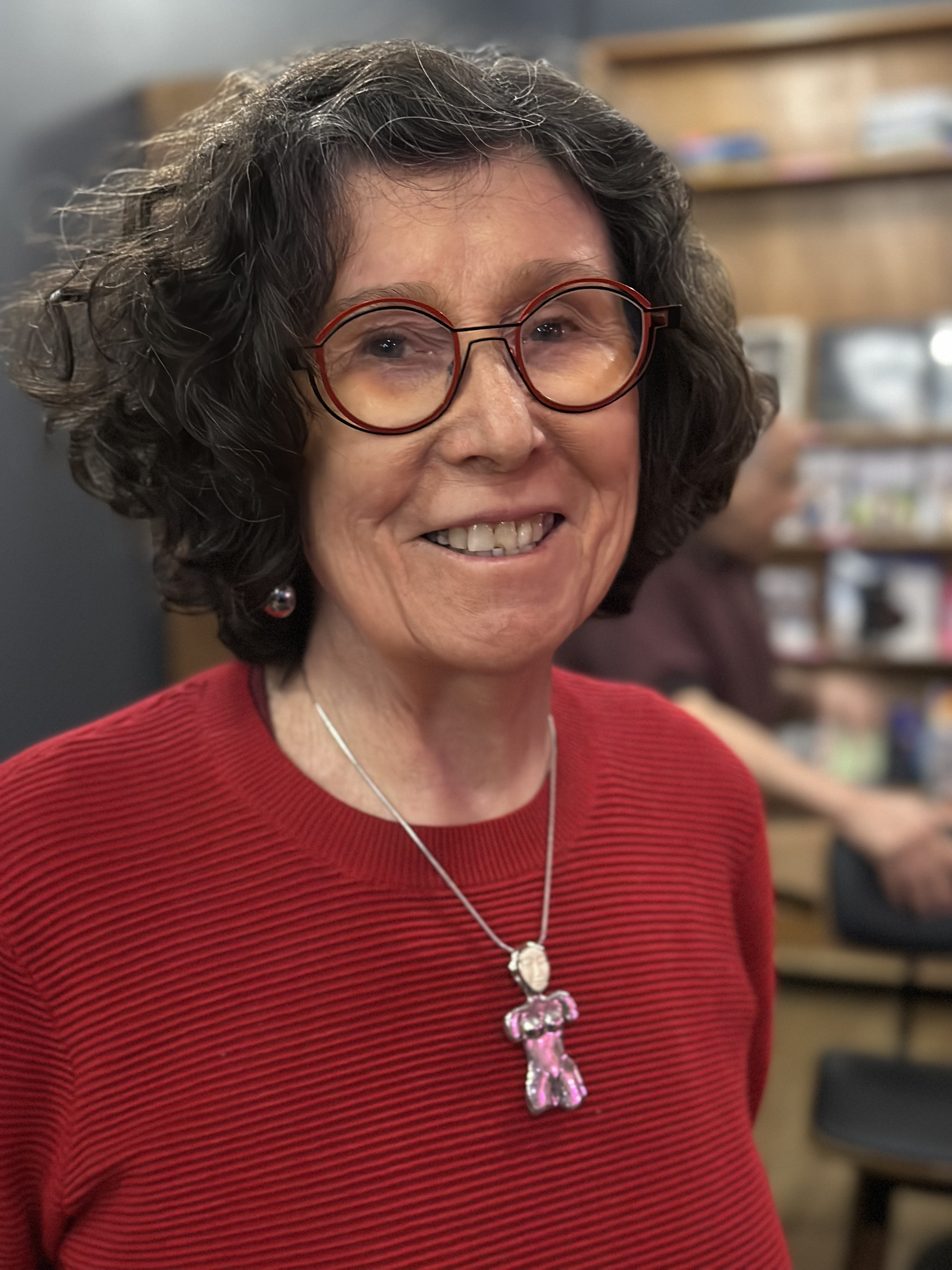
Hynes at Glad Day Bookshop in 2023

Maureen Hynes is a Canadian poet and author. Her debut collection of poetry, Rough Skin (Wolsak and Wynn), won the League of Canadian Poets' Gerald Lampert Award for best first book of poetry by a Canadian in 1996.

== Teaching and service ==
Hynes taught ESL, trained ESL/EFL teachers, and published ESL textbooks, founded and coordinated the School of Labour at George Brown College in Toronto, and for over eight years, was the college's multicultural/anti-racism coordinator. For her last four years at George Brown, she was part of a four-person team offering "Positive Space" workshops to bring visibility and support to lesbian, gay, bisexual, trans, two-spirit and queer/questioning students and staff.

Hynes has also taught creative non-fiction and personal narrative in the Creative Writing program at the University of Toronto's School of Continuing Studies, and gives frequent workshops in poetry and creative writing.

She has also been an active member of the Ontario Public Service Employees Union, a board member of Mayworks, Toronto's annual Festival of Working People and the Arts, and of the Centre for Study of Education and Work (CSEW) at the Ontario Institute for Studies in Education.

Hynes, a lesbian, served on the first jury for the Dayne Ogilvie Prize in 1998, a literary award for emerging LGBT writers in Canada, selecting Zoe Whittall as that year's winner.

She has also served on juries for the League of Canadian Poets' Pat Lowther Memorial Prize, the Bannister Poetry Award, Canadian University Press Student Journalism Awards and the Dan Sullivan Poetry Award. Hynes was a member of the Toronto Arts Council's Literary Committee from 2008 to 2011.

== Writing ==
Her debut collection of poetry, Rough Skin (Wolsak and Wynn), won the League of Canadian Poets' Gerald Lampert Award for best first book of poetry by a Canadian in 1996. Her second collection, Harm's Way, was published by Brick Books in 2001, and her third, Marrow, Willow, was published in 2011 by Pedlar Press in Toronto. In 2015, Pedlar Press published Hynes's The Poison Colour. For The Poison Colour, she was a 2016 finalist for the League of Canadian Poets' Pat Lowther Award and Raymond Souster Award.

Hynes is also a winner of the Petra Kenney Poetry Prize (London, England). Her poems have been shortlisted for the CBC Literary Awards. Her fiction and poetry have appeared in over twenty anthologies, including Braid and Shreve's In Fine Form, 2nd Edition: A Contemporary Look at Canadian Form Poetry. Hynes's poem, "Wing On," was selected by Helen Humphreys for Best Canadian Poetry in English 2016, and "The Last Cigarette" was chosen as one of 50 poems for Best Canadian Poetry in English 2010, edited by Lorna Crozier). Her poem "The Poison Colour" was longlisted for the same collection in 2011, edited by Priscila Uppal. Hynes's work has appeared in notable Canadian literary journals including The Malahat, The Fiddlehead, Arc, The Literary Review of Canada, Descant, Contemporary Verse 2, Prairie Fire, The Antigonish Review and Queen's Quarterly.

She has edited and co-edited several collections of poetry and is poetry editor for Our Times, Canada's national labour magazine.

In addition to her poetry collections, Hynes published a memoir, Letters from China (Women's Press, 1981) about her experiences as a teacher trainer in China just after the end of the Cultural Revolution.

== Works ==
- Letters from China, Women's Press, Toronto, Ont. 1981 (ISBN 0-88961-071-1)
- Rough Skin, Wolsak and Wynn, Toronto, Ont. 1995 (ISBN 978-0-919897-45-8)
- we make the air: Poems by Lina Chartrand, co-edited with Ingrid MacDonald, TLC Press, Toronto, Ont. 1999 (ISBN 978-0-9684557-0-8)
- Harm's Way, Brick Books, London, Ont. 2001 (ISBN 978-1-897141-39-7)
- Marrow, Willow, Pedlar Press, Toronto, Ont. 2011 (ISBN 978-1-897141-39-7)
- Cry Uncle, Aeolus Books, Toronto, Ont. 2013. Co-edited with Allan Briesmaster and Sue Chenette, (ISBN 978-0-9878154-7-7)
- The Poison Colour, Pedlar Press, St John's, NL 2015 (ISBN 978-1-897141-71-7)
- Sotto Voce Brick Books, London, Ont, 2019 (ISBN 978-1771315142)
- Take the Compass, McGill-Queen's University Press, Kingston ON (ISBN 978-0-2280-1881-0)

== Anthologies (selected) ==
- Frictions II: Stories by Women, ed. Rhea Tregebov, Toronto: Second Story Press, 1993
- A Room at the Heart of Things, ed. Elisabeth Harvor, Montreal: Vehicle Press, 1999.
- Riprap: The Banff Centre's 25th Anniversary Collection, Volume 2, ed. E. Alford, D. McKay, R. Tregebov, R. Wyatt, Banff Centre Press, 1999.
- Why I Sing the Blues,eds. Brad Cran and Jan Zwicky, Vancouver: Arsenal Pulp Press, 2001.
- Bent on Writing: Contemporary Queer Tales, ed. Elizabeth Ruth, Toronto: Canadian Scholar's Press/Women's Press, 2002.
- In Fine Form: The Canadian Book of Form Poetry, eds. Kate Braid and Sandy Shreve, Vancouver BC: Polestar Press, 2005.
- A Verse Map of Vancouver, Ed. George McWhirter, photographs by Derek Von Essen. Vancouver: Anvil Press. 2009.
- Best Canadian Poetry 2010, Ed. Lorna Crozier. Toronto: Tightrope Books, 2011. "The Last Cigarette."
- The Bright Well, Ed. Fiona Tinwei Lam, Vancouver Island, B.C.: Leaf Press, 2011.
- The Wild Weathers: A Gathering of Love Poems, Ed. Ursula Vaira, Vancouver Island, B.C.: Leaf Press, 2012.
- Untying the Apron: Daughters Remember Mothers of the 1950s, Ed. Lorri Neilsen Glenn. Toronto: Guernica Press, 2013.
- Poems from Planet Earth, Ed. Yvonne Blomer. Vancouver Island, B.C.: Leaf Press, 2013.
- I Found it at the Movies: An Anthology of Film Poets, ed. Ruth Roach Pierson, Toronto: Guernica Editions, 2014
- Reading the Don: Poetry Walk on the occasion of the opening of the Pan Am Path. Toronto: Gesture Press, 2015
- High Art: Poetry Walk in High Park. Toronto: Gesture Press, 2016.
- Abundance: A Harvest of Texts for the Pickering Lands. Toronto: Gesture Press and Fieldnotes Press, 2016.
- In Fine Form: A Contemporary Look at Canadian Form Poetry, 2nd edition, eds. Kate Braid and Sandy Shreve, Halfmoon Bay, BC: Caitlin Press, 2016. "Late Love Song: A Cento."
- Sustenance: Writers from BC and Beyond on the Subject of Food, Ed. Rachel Rose. Vancouver: Anvil Press, 2017. "Crabapple Jelly."
- Best Canadian Poetry 2016, Ed. Helen Humphreys. Toronto: Tightrope Books, 2016.
- Best of the Best Canadian Poetry in English, 2006-2016.Ed. Anita Lahey and Molly Peacock, Toronto: Tightrope Press, 2017. "The Last Cigarette."
- Love Me True: Writers Reflect on the Ins, Outs, Ups and Downs of Marriage, Eds Fiona Lam and Jane Silcott. Halfmoon Bay, BC: Caitlin Press, 2018.
- Voicing Suicide, Ed. Daniel Scott. Victoria, BC: Ekstasis Editions, forthcoming 2020. "The Christmas Animal –".
