= Pat Lowther Award =

Canadian poetry award

The Pat Lowther Memorial Award is an annual Canadian literary award presented by the League of Canadian Poets to the year's best book of poetry by a Canadian woman. The award was established in 1980 to honour poet Pat Lowther, who was murdered by her husband in 1975. Each winner receives an honorarium of $1000.

== Winners and shortlists ==
=== 1980s ===
Year	Poet	Title	Result	Ref.
1981	M. Travis Lane	Divinations and Short Poems 1973–1978	Winner	
1982	Rona Murray	Journey	Winner	
1983	Rhea Tregebov	Remembering History	Winner	
1984	Bronwen Wallace	Signs of the Former Tenant	Winner	
1985	Paulette Jiles	Celestial Navigation	Winner	
1986	Erín Moure	Domestic Fuel	Winner	
1987	Heather Spears	How to Read Faces	Winner	
1987	Jan Conn	The Fabulous Disguise of Ourselves	Shortlist	
1987	Anne Michaels	The Weight of Oranges	Shortlist	
1988	Gwendolyn MacEwen	Afterworlds	Winner	
1988	Gay Allison	The Unravelling	Shortlist	
1988	Judith Fitzgerald	Diary of Desire	Shortlist	
1988	Sharon Thesen	The Beginning of the Long Dash	Shortlist	
1988	Bronwen Wallace	The Stubborn Particulars of Grace	Shortlist	
1989	Heather Spears	The Word for Sand	Winner	
1989	Joan Finnigan	The Watershed Collection	Shortlist	
1989	Erín Moure	Furious	Shortlist	

=== 1990s ===
Year	Poet	Title	Result	Ref.
1990	Patricia Young	The Mad and Beautiful Mothers	Winner	
1990	Roo Borson	Intent, Or the Weight of the World	Shortlist	
1990	Barbara Carey	The Year in Pictures	Shortlist	
1990	Cathy Ford	Saffron, Rose & Flame	Shortlist	
1990	Erín Moure	WSW (West South West)	Shortlist	
1990	Jan Zwicky	The New Room	Shortlist	
1991	Karen Connelly	The Small Words in My Body	Winner	
1991	Dionne Brand	No Language Is Neutral	Shortlist	
1991	Elizabeth Brewster	Spring Again	Shortlist	
1991	Jan Conn	South of the Tudo Bem Cafe	Shortlist	
1992	Kate Braid	Covering Rough Ground	Winner	
1993	Lorna Crozier	Inventing the Hawk	Winner	
1994	Diana Brebner	The Golden Lotus	Winner	
1995	Beth Goobie	Scars of Light	Winner	
1996	Lorna Crozier	Everything Arrives at the Light	Winner	
1996	Margaret Atwood	Morning in the Burned House	Shortlist	
1996	Di Brandt	Jerusalem, Beloved	Shortlist	
1996	Anne Szumigalski	Voice	Shortlist	
1996	Sharon Thesen	Aurora	Shortlist	
1996	Sue Wheeler	Solstice on the Anacortes Ferry	Shortlist	
1997	Marilyn Bowering	Autobiography	Winner	
1997	Roo Borson	Water Memory	Shortlist	
1997	Meira Cook	Toward a Catalogue of Falling	Shortlist	
1997	Lynn Crosbie	Pearl	Shortlist	
1998	Barbara Nickel	The Gladys Elegies	Winner	
1998	Dionne Brand	Land to Light On	Shortlist	
1998	April Bulmer	The Weight of Wings	Shortlist	
1998	Heather Cadsby	A Tantrum of Synonyms	Shortlist	
1998	Elisabeth Harvor	The Long Cold Green Evenings of Spring	Shortlist	
1998	Barbara Mulcahy	The Man With the Dancing Monkey	Shortlist	
1998	Linda Rogers	Heaven Cake	Shortlist	
1998	Patricia Young	What I Remember From My Time on Earth	Shortlist	
1999	Hilary Clark	More Light	Winner	

=== 2000s ===
Year	Poet	Title	Result	Ref.
2000	Esta Spalding	Lost August	Winner	
2000	Susan Holbrook	Misled	Shortlist	
2000	Helen Humphreys	Anthem	Shortlist	
2000	Erín Moure	The Frame of the Book	Shortlist	
2000	Rachel Rose	Giving My Body to Science	Shortlist	
2001	Sharon Thesen	A Pair of Scissors	Winner	
2002	Heather Spears	Required Reading: A Witness in Words and Drawings to the Reena Virk Trials 1998-2000	Winner	
2003	Dionne Brand	thirsty	Winner	
2004	Betsy Struthers	Still	Winner	
2004	Di Brandt	Now You Care	Shortlist	
2004	Mary Dalton	Merrybegot	Shortlist	
2004	Tonja Gunvaldsen Klaassen	Or	Shortlist	
2004	Jeanette Lynes	Left Fields	Shortlist	
2004	Erin Noteboom	Ghost Maps: Poems for Carl Hruska	Shortlist	
2005	Roo Borson	Short Journey Upriver Toward Oishida	Winner	
2005	Ronna Bloom	Public Works	Shortlist	
2005	Aislinn Hunter	The Possible Past	Shortlist	
2005	K. I. Press	Spine	Shortlist	
2005	Sue Sinclair	The Drunken Lovely Bird	Shortlist	
2005	Jan Zwicky	Robinson's Crossing	Shortlist	
2006	Sylvia Legris	Nerve Squall	Winner	
2007	Sina Queyras	Lemon Hound	Winner	
2008	Anne Simpson	Quick	Winner	
2008	Alison Calder	Wolf Tree	Shortlist	
2008	Louise Bernice Halfe	The Crooked Good	Shortlist	
2008	Nadine McInnis	Two Hemispheres	Shortlist	
2008	Olive Senior	Shell	Shortlist	
2008	Agnes Walsh	Going Around With Bachelors	Shortlist	
2009	Alice Major	The Office Tower Tales	Winner	
2009	Margaret Christakos	What Stirs	Shortlist	
2009	Linda Frank	Kahlo: The World Split Open	Shortlist	
2009	Daphne Marlatt	The Given	Shortlist	
2009	Sue Sinclair	Breaker	Shortlist	
2009	Heather Spears	I can still draw	Shortlist	

=== 2010s ===
Year	Poet	Title	Result	Ref.
2010	Karen Solie	Pigeon	Winner	
2010	Elizabeth Bachinsky	God of Missed Connections	Shortlist	
2010	Ronna Bloom	Permiso	Shortlist	
2010	Sina Queyras	Expressway	Shortlist	
2010	Damian Rogers	Paper Radio	Shortlist	
2010	Laisha Rosnau	Lousy Explorers	Shortlist	
2011	Evelyn Lau	Living Under Plastic	Winner	
2011	Dionne Brand	Ossuaries	Shortlist	
2011	Di Brandt	Walking to Mojácar	Shortlist	
2011	Alice Major	Memory’s Daughter	Shortlist	
2011	Pamela Porter	Cathedral	Shortlist	
2011	Nela Rio	La luna, Tango, siempre la luna/ The Moon, Tango, Always the Moon	Shortlist	
2012	Susan Goyette	outskirts	Winner	
2012	Stephanie Bolster	A Page from the Wonders of Life on Earth	Shortlist	
2012	Lorna Crozier	Small Mechanics	Shortlist	
2012	Rosemary Griebel	Yes	Shortlist	
2012	Amanda Jernigan	Groundwork	Shortlist	
2012	Jan Zwicky	Forge	Shortlist	
2013	Rachel Rose	Song and Spectacle	Winner	
2013	Marilyn Bowering	Soul Mouth	Shortlist	
2013	Julie Bruck	Monkey Ranch	Shortlist	
2013	Lorna Crozier	The Book of Marvels	Shortlist	
2013	Maureen Scott Harris	Slow Curve Out	Shortlist	
2013	Evelyn Lau	A Grain of Rice	Shortlist	
2014	Alexandra Oliver	Meeting the Tormentors in Safeway	Winner	
2014	Elizabeth Bachinsky	The Hottest Summer in Recorded History	Shortlist	
2014	Anne Compton	Alongside	Shortlist	
2014	Sadiqa de Meijer	Leaving Howe Island	Shortlist	
2014	Micheline Maylor	Whirr and Click	Shortlist	
2014	Sarah Yi-Mei Tsiang	Status Update	Shortlist	
2015	Sina Queyras	MxT	Winner	
2015	Joanne Arnott	Halfling Spring: an internet romance	Shortlist	
2015	Jen Currin	School	Shortlist	
2015	Judy Halebsky	Tree Line	Shortlist	
2015	Jude Neale	A Quiet Coming of Light	Shortlist	
2015	Lisa Robertson	Cinema of the Present	Shortlist	
2016	Lorna Crozier	The Wrong Cat	Winner	
2016	Rosanna Deerchild	calling down the sky	Shortlist	
2016	Adebe DeRango-Adem	Terra Incognita	Shortlist	
2016	Maureen Hynes	The Poison Colour	Shortlist	
2016	Rachel Rose	Marry & Burn	Shortlist	
2016	Sarah Tolmie	Trio	Shortlist	
2017	Sue Sinclair	Heaven's Thieves	Winner	
2017	Anne Carson	Float	Shortlist	
2017	Julie Cameron Gray	Lady Crawford	Shortlist	
2017	Otoniya J. Okot Bitek	100 Days	Shortlist	
2017	Alexandra Oliver	Let the Empire Down	Shortlist	
2017	Johanna Skibsrud	The Description of the World	Shortlist	
2018	Lesley Belleau	Indianland	Winner	
2018	Mary di Michele	Bicycle Thieves	Shortlist	
2018	Susan Elmslie	Museum of Kindness	Shortlist	
2018	Beth Goobie	Breathing at Dusk	Shortlist	
2018	Catherine Owen	Dear Ghost	Shortlist	
2018	Phoebe Wang	Admission Requirements	Shortlist	
2019	Klara du Plessis	Ekke	Winner	
2019	Dani Couture	Listen Before Transmit	Shortlist	
2019	Emilia Nielsen	Body Work	Shortlist	
2019	Laura Ritland	East and West	Shortlist	
2019	Deanna Young	Reunion	Shortlist	
2019	Jennifer Zilm	The Missing Field	Shortlist	

=== 2020s ===
Year	Poet	Title	Result	Ref.
2020	Chantal Gibson	How She Read	Winner	
2020	Roxanna Bennett	Unmeaningable	Shortlist	
2020	Maureen Hynes	Sotto Voce	Shortlist	
2020	Doyali Islam	heft	Shortlist	
2020	Michelle Porter	Inquiries	Shortlist	
2020	Karen Solie	The Caiplie Caves	Shortlist	
2020	Souvankham Thammavongsa	Cluster	Shortlist	
2021	Noor Naga	Washes, Prays	Winner	
2021	Cicely Belle Blain	Burning Sugar	Shortlist	
2021	Jody Chan	Sick	Shortlist	
2021	Jillian Christmas	the gospel of breaking	Shortlist	
2021	Kyla Jamieson	Body Count	Shortlist	
2021	shalan joudry	Waking Ground	Shortlist	
2022	Selina Boan	Undoing Hours	Winner	
2022	Sheri Benning	Field Requiem	Shortlist	
2022	Margaret Christakos	Dear Birch	Shortlist	
2022	Leah Horlick	Moldovan Hotel	Shortlist	
2022	Lillian Nećakov	Il Virus	Shortlist	
2022	Rebecca Salazar	sulphurtongue	Shortlist	
2023	Gillian Sze	Quiet Night Think	Winner	
2023	Sylvia D. Hamilton	Tender	Shortlist	
2023	Annick MacAskill	Shadow Blight	Shortlist	
2023	Cecily Nicholson	Harrowings	Shortlist	
2023	Otoniya J. Okot Bitek	A Is for Acholi	Shortlist	
2023	Lisa Robertson	Boat	Shortlist	
2024	Sandra Ridley	Vixen	Winner	
2024	Britta Badour	Wires That Sputter	Shortlist	
2024	Eva H.D.	The Natural Hustle	Shortlist	
2024	Laila Malik	Archipelago	Shortlist	
2024	Kate Siklosi	Selvage	Shortlist	
2024	Kai Cheng Thom	Falling Back in Love with Being Human	Shortlist	
2025	Bren Simmers	The Work	Winner	
2025	Faith Arkorful	The Seventh Town of Ghosts	Shortlist	
2025	Manahil Bandukwala	Heliotropia	Shortlist	
2025	Shani Mootoo	Oh Witness Dey!	Shortlist	
2025	Zehra Naqvi	The Knot of My Tongue	Shortlist	
2025	Barbara Tran	Precedented Parroting	Shortlist	

== See also ==
- Canadian poetry
- List of literary awards honoring women
- List of poetry awards
- List of years in poetry
- List of years in literature
- Gerald Lampert Award
