= Fireweed (periodical) =

Canadian literary magazine

Fireweed: A Feminist Quarterly of Writing, Politics, Art & Culture, was founded in Toronto, Canada, in 1978 by the Fireweed Collective. Collective members have included Gay Allison, Lynne Fernie, Hilda Kirkwood, Liz Brady, Elizabeth Ruth, Makeda Silvera, Carolyn Smart and Rhea Tregebov. Issues of Fireweed usually focus on a theme or topic, such as "Writing" (#10), "Fear & Violence" (#14), "Women of Colour" (#16), "Canadian Women Poets" (#23), "Class" (#25 & 26), "Sex & Sexuality" (#37 & 38), and "Language" (#44/45), though there are frequent "open" issues.

The quarterly's ISSN is 0706-3857.

== See also ==
- List of literary magazines
