= Lupe Gómez =

Galician poet and journalist

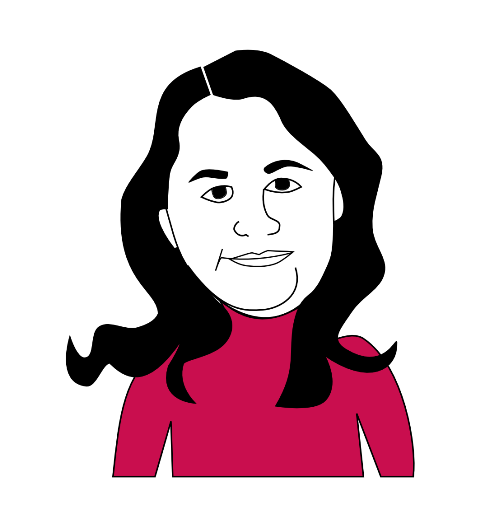
Lupe Gómez, caricature in Tintadelura.com

Lupe Gómez is a Galician poet and journalist born in 1972 in Fisteus, Curtis. She studied journalism in Santiago de Compostela, and collaborated with El Correo Gallego and Galicia Hoxe, in addition to writing articles and book and theater reviews. Her books meant a bath of naturality, courage and freshness for Galician literature of the late 20th century.

== Works ==
- Pornografía (1995)
- Os teus dedos na miña braga con regra (1999)
- Poesía fea (2000)
- Fisteus era un mundo (2001)
- Querida Uxía (2004)
- Levantar as tetas (2004)
- Luz e Lupe (2005)
- Azul e estranxeira (2005)
- O útero dos cabalos (2005)
- Quero bailar (2006)
- A grafia dos mapas (2010)
- Camuflaxe (2017) (translated into English by Erín Moure as Camouflage, Circumference Books, 2019)
- Fosforescencias (2019)
