= Otoniya J. Okot Bitek =

Kenyan-born Ugandan-raised diasporic writer and academic residing in Canada

- Juliane Okot Bitek at the Frankfurt Book Fair 2026
- Born: 1966 (age 59–60); Kenya
- Other name: Juliane Okot Bitek
- Citizenship: Canadian
- Education: University of British Columbia (Bachelor of Fine Arts) (Master of Arts) (Doctor of Philosophy)
- Occupations: Writer, poet, scholar and university instructor
- Years active: 1987–present
- Known for: Poetry
- Notable work: 100 Days (2016); A Is for Acholi (2022); We, the Kindling (2025)
- Father: Okot p'Bitek
- Website: julianeokotbitek.com

Otoniya J. Okot Bitek (born 1966), also known as Juliane Okot Bitek, is a Kenyan-born Ugandan-raised diasporic writer and academic, who lives, studies and works in Kingston, Ontario, Canada. She is perhaps best-known for her poetry book 100 Days, a reflection on the 100-day 1994 Rwandan genocide, in which an estimated 800,000 Tutsi and Hutu people were killed. She has been a contributor to several anthologies, including in 2019 New Daughters of Africa: An International Anthology of Writing by Women of African Descent, edited by Margaret Busby.

== Biography ==
Otoniya Juliane Okot Bitek was born in Kenya in 1966 to Ugandan evacuees. Her father was the late Okot p'Bitek, an internationally recognized Acholi poet and scholar. Growing up, Okot Bitek was an avid reader who was encouraged by her parents to write. The first time she had a poem of hers published, she was 11 years old.

In 1990, she migrated from Uganda and settled on the unceded lands of the Musqueam, Squamish, and Tsleil Waututh peoples. She holds a Bachelor of Fine Arts degree in creative writing (1995), a Master of Arts degree in English from the University of British Columbia (UBC). In May 2020, she completed her PhD in Interdisciplinary Studies from UBC's Liu Institute for Global Issues .

Okot Bitek is also an "ardent fan" of Leonard Cohen's music. She has two children.

== Career ==
Okot Bitek is a literary artist, poet, writer, scholar, and a sessional instructor at Emily Carr University of Art and Design's Faculty of Culture + Community. Her works incorporate themes of exile, home, belonging, and diaspora.

Okot Bitek is a prolific author, whose writing has been published in a variety of formats, including in literary magazines and journals such as ARC, Whetstone, Fugue, and Room of One’s Own. In 2017, her poem "Trees Line the Street" was featured in Transition, Issue 124: Writing Black Canadas. As of March 2021, she has contributed to The Capilano Review on five different occasions, between 2017 and 2019. The first book she published was titled Words in Black Cinnamon: A collection of Poetry and was published in 1998.

In 2018, her work "Sentry" was included in the anthology Love Me True, a collection of writings about the challenges, joys, and evolutions that exist within longterm relationships. Her work has also been anthologized in Great Black North: Contemporary African Canadian Poetry (2012), and Revolving City: 51 Poems and the Stories Behind Them (2015), and New Daughters of Africa: An International Anthology of Writing by Women of African Descent (2019).

Her book 100 Days was based on a "loose collaboration" with Kenyan-American artist, Wangechi Mutu. On 6 April 2014, Mutu began posting images on social media, counting down from 100. When Okot Bitek saw the first image, she knew immediately from the context that it was a countdown to the 20th anniversary of the Rwandan genocide, and wanted to make work "to countdown with her." Okot Bitek reached out to Mutu in order to agree on a collaboration, where Okot Bitek would use text to respond to Mutu's images. As the days went on and the anniversary grew closer, she and Mutu (respectively) would post one poem and one photograph every day, as a way to create space for, and grieve in solidarity and community, the horrific events of the spring and summer of 1994.

Okot Bitek has also been a part of a variety of global poetry and writing festivals and events, including the Fraser Valley Literary Festival (2020), the Festival Internacional de Poesía de Granada in Nicaragua (2009), and the Medellín International Poetry Festival in Colombia (2008).

She was the 2020/21 Ellen and Warren Tallman Writer in Residence at Simon Fraser University, and has been a poetry ambassador for the City of Vancouver, working with Vancouver Poet Laureate Rachel Rose.

== Recognition ==
In 2004, Okot Bitek's short story "Going Home" was an award winner in the 2004 Commonwealth Short Story Competition. It was featured on the British Broadcasting Corporation and Canadian Broadcasting Corporation.

Her story "War No More" won first prize in a StopWar post-secondary essay competition in 2005. An essay in Iris Chang's The Rape of Nanking also won a special mention in 2006 and is included in an anthology of winning essays from that year. In 2007, Okot Bitek received a grant from the Canada Council, which has facilitated her to write more non-fiction work.

Okot Bitek's 100 Days is one of her most highly regarded works. In 2017, it was the recipient of multiple awards, including the Glenna Luschei Prize for African Poetry, the INDIEFAB Book of the Year Awards (Poetry), AAUP Book, Jacket & Journal Show, Book (Poetry and Literature, Jackets & Covers), and was shortlisted for several more. John Keene, one of the judges for the 2017 Glenna Luschei award, wrote: "In 100 Days, poet Juliane Okot Bitek set out to memorialize the tragedy of the Rwandan genocide, but the witnessing force of these brief, incantatory poems ripples outward to figuratively encompass multiple histories of violence and brutality, including the terror her own family and countless others faced under Idi Amin’s regime in Uganda. The lyric beauty, intertextual depth, and metonymic power of Okot Bitek's poetry underscores the capacities of art and language to cast light into the darkest corners of our human experience, and bridge the gulfs that lie between us.

Her poetry collection A Is for Acholi was shortlisted for the 2023 Pat Lowther Award, and for the 2023 Jim Deva Prize for Writing that Provokes.

Her novel We, the Kindling was longlisted for the 2025 Giller Prize, and shortlisted for the 2025 Atwood Gibson Writers' Trust Fiction Prize and the Trillium Book Award for English Prose.

== Bibliography ==
- Words in Black Cinnamon: A Collection of Poetry (Delina Publishing, 1998)
- 100 Days (University of Alberta Press, 2016)
- Gauntlet (Nomados, 2019)
- A Is for Acholi (Buckrider Books, 2022)
- Song & Dread: Poems (Talonbooks, 2023)
- We, the Kindling (Knopf Canada, 2025)
