= This Radiant Life =

Book by Chantal Neveu

- Author: Chantal Neveu
- Original title: La vie radieuse
- Translator: Erín Moure
- Language: English
- Genre: Poetry
- Publisher: La Peuplade, Book*hug
- Publication date: October 3, 2016
- Publication place: Canada
- English publication date: November 19, 2020
- Media type: Print: paperback; Digital: eBook
- Pages: 240 (French edition); 236 (English edition)
- Award: Governor General’s Literary Award
- ISBN: 9781771666336

This Radiant Life is an English translation of the 2016 book La vie radieuse, a single long poem written by Canadian author Chantal Neveu, and translated by Canadian poet and translator Erín Moure. This Radiant Life was published in November 2020 by literary press Book*hug in Toronto Ontario. It is the winner of the 2021 Governor General's Literary Award for French to English translation.

== Synopsis ==
This Radiant Life is a book-length poem that examines the elements that make up our reality, as well as the gaps found between them. It analyses the concept of our unique selves and how they fit into a larger collective whole.

== Awards ==
This Radiant Life won the Governor General’s Literary Award for French to English translation at the 2021 Governor General's Awards, and was a finalist for the 2021 Nelson Ball Poetry Prize.

== Reception ==
The book was generally well received. Lily Nilipour writes in the triannual magazine Zyzzyva, "This Radiant Life seeks to find the light that emerges not just from the collisions of particles but also the actions and interactions of people". In its book review for the Governor General Literary Awards, the peer assessment committee states, “Moure has crafted a spectacular English poem in conversation with the French—a work channelling science, art, revolution and corporeal movement balanced in stillness and space."
