= Robert Majzels =

Canadian writer

Robert Majzels (born May 12, 1950) is a Canadian novelist, poet, playwright and translator.

== Life ==
Majzels was born in Montreal, Quebec. In 1986, he graduated with a master's degree in English Literature from Concordia University in Montreal, where he would later teach creative writing for thirteen years. Between 2000 and 2002, he lived in Beijing, China and studied Chinese. After teaching for seven years at the University of Calgary, he now lives in Sooke, British Columbia.

== Works ==
Majzels is strongly influenced by critical and literary theory. His works explore both the limits of language and narrative forms and their ethical repercussions. His novels highlight the artificiality of Western literary language, especially its linearity, archetypal narratives, and the ways in which it works to establish characters as believable personae (characterization). Concurrently, they explore other, neglected forms of literary expression. For example, Apikoros Sleuth experimented with a Talmudic form, noted for its polyphonic, discursive, and digressive qualities.

== Awards ==
- 2000 Governor General's Award for French to English translation for Just Fine, from the French Pas Pire, by France Daigle (2000).
- 2008 Griffin Poetry Prize shortlist for Notebook of Roses and Civilization, from the French Cahier de roses & de civilisation, by Nicole Brossard (2007).
- 2008 Governor General's Award for French to English translation nomination with Erín Moure for Notebook of Roses and Civilization, from the French Cahier de roses & de civilisation, by Nicole Brossard (2007).
- 2014 Best Translated Book Award, Poetry, shortlist for White Piano by Nicole Brossard, from the French.
- 1994 Canadian Jewish Playwriting Competition, first prize for This Night the Kapo.
- 1991 Dorothy Silver Award, Playwrights competition, first prize for This Night the Kapo.

== Partial bibliography ==
Novels

- 1992: Hellman's Scrapbook a novel. Cormorant Books ISBN 0-920953-78-6
- 1998: City of Forgetting a novel. Mercury Press ISBN 1-55128-045-0
- 2004: Apikoros Sleuth a novel. Mercury Press ISBN 1-55128-105-8
- 2007: The Humbugs Diet a novel. Mercury Press ISBN 1-55128-130-9
- 2020: kHarLaMoV's aNkLe: A Utopian Fantasy. The Elephants ISBN 978-1-988979-31-1
- 2023: deAd liNeS. Zat-So Productions ISBN 978-0-9867595-6-7

Plays

- 2005: This Night the Kapo. Playwrights Canada Press ISBN 978-0887547829

Translations

- 1999: A Fine Passage a novel, translated from the French Un fin passage by France Daigle. Anansi ISBN 0-88784-681-5
- 2000: Installations poetry translated with Erín Moure from the French Installations by Nicole Brossard. Muses' Co. ISBN 1-896239-65-X
- 2002: Museum of Bone and Water poetry, translated with Erín Moure from the French Musée de l'os et de l'eau by Nicole Brossard. Anansi ISBN 0-88784-686-6
- 2004: Life's Little Difficulties a novel, translated from the French Petites difficultés d'existence by France Daigle. ISBN 0-88784-700-5
- 2013: For Sure translated from the French Pour sûr by France Daigle. Anansi ISBN 978-1770892040
