= Jan Conn =

Canadian geneticist and poet

Jan E. Conn (born 1952) is a Canadian geneticist and poet. She resides in Great Barrington, Massachusetts where she does research on mosquito genetics at the Wadsworth Center, Division of Infectious Diseases, New York State Department of Health in Albany, New York. She has also written six books of poetry.

== Biography ==
Conn was born in Asbestos, Quebec and moved to Montreal at the age of 17. She received her Ph.D. in genetics from the University of Toronto in 1987. She has traveled to Guatemala, Venezuela, Florida, Vermont and Massachusetts, conducting research on insects that transmit pathogens. Before taking up her current work on population genetics of malaria-carrying mosquitoes in South America and Africa, she was a recognized expert on the genetics of Black fly (Simulium) species vectoring river blindness (onchocerciasis) in Central America.

=== Poetry ===
Conn has written several books of poetry, including Jaguar Rain: the Margaret Mee poems, inspired by the diaries and botanical art of Margaret Mee. She has won numerous awards and major travel grants related to poetry, including a CBC Literary Prize, the inaugural P.K. Page Founder’s Award, and a nomination for a Pushcart Prize in 2016. In 1987, her book The Fabulous Disguise of Ourselves was shortlisted for the Pat Lowther Award, as was South of the Tudo Bem Cafe, in 1991.

== Bibliography ==
- Red Shoes in the Rain - 1980 ISBN 0-86492-025-3
- The Fabulous Disguise of Ourselves - 1986 ISBN 091989075X
- South of the Tudo Bem Cafe - 1990 ISBN 9781550650082
- What Dante Did With Loss - 1996 ISBN 978-1550650525
- Beauties on Mad River - 2000 ISBN 9781550651409
- Jaguar Rain: the Margaret Mee poems - 2006 ISBN 9781894078481
- Botero's Beautiful Horses - 2009 ISBN 978-1894078719
- Peony Vertigo - 2023 ISBN 9781771316163

== See also ==
- List of Canadian poets
