= Ralph Gustafson =

Canadian poet and professor (1909–1995)

Ralph Barker Gustafson, CM (16 August 1909 – 29 May 1995) was a Canadian poet and professor at Bishop's University.

== Biography ==
He was born in Lime Ridge, near Dudswell, Quebec on August 16, 1909. His mother was British, his father, Carl Otto Gustafson, was a Swedish photographer. He was educated at Bishop's University, earning a B.A. (1st class honours and winner of the Governor General's medal along with many other awards) in 1929 and an M.A. in 1930, with a thesis on John Keats and Percy Bysshe Shelley. He also completed a B.A. at Keble College, Oxford in 1933, an M.A. in 1963.

Over the years, Dr. Gustafson held a number of posts. He was music master, Bishop's College School, 1920–30; teacher of English St. Alban's School for Boys, Brockville, Ontario, 1933–34; tutor and journalist, London, England, 1935–38; British Information Services, New York, N.Y., 1942–46; Professor and Poet-In-Residence, Bishop's University, 1963–79 and music critic, C.B.C., since 1960. Dr. Gustafson wrote over twenty volumes of poetry and prose and edited several anthologies of verse. He died in 1995.

His views on poetry are documented in essays collected in Plummets and Other Partialities (1986), and in letters to W.W.E. Ross published as A Literary Friendship in 1984. He also was in contact with John Sutherland.

Gustafson's early poetry owes a significant debt to Gerard Manley Hopkins (as evidenced in The Golden Chalice (1935) and Alfred the Great (1937)), while Ezra Pound, Wallace Stevens, and W. B. Yeats were important influences on his later work.

In 1942, Gustafson edited the Anthology of Canadian Poetry which developed into the Penguin Book of Canadian Verse in 1958, both volumes a reflection of his extensive studies on the history of Canadian poetry.

== Recognition ==
Gustafson won the Governor General's Award 1974 for Fire on Stone.

He was appointed to the Order of Canada in 1992.

He was awarded a D. Litt. from Mount Allison University in 1973, a D.C.L. from Bishop's University in 1977, and a D. Litt from York University in 1991.

Winter Prophecies (1998) is a documentary profile (29 min.) on Gustafson's life and art directed by Donald Winkler and produced by the National Film Board of Canada (NFB).

== Works ==
- The Golden Chalice (London: Ivor Nicholson & Watson, 1935)
- Alfred the Great (London: Michael Joseph, 1937)
- Epithalamium in Time of War (New York: L. F. White, 1941)
- Lyrics Unromantic (New York: Privately printed, 1942)
- Flight into Darkness: Poems (New York: Pantheon, 1944)
- Quebec, Late Autumn (Offprint from Queen's Quarterly, 1950)
- Quebec Winter Scene (Offprint from Dalhousie Review, 1952)
- Hard Litany (Offprint from the Dalhousie Review, 1953)
- Rivers Among Rocks (Toronto: McClelland and Stewart, 1960)
- Rocky Mountain Poems (Vancouver: Klanak, 1960)
- Sift in an Hourglass (Toronto: McClelland and Stewart, 1966)
- Ixion's Wheel: Poems (Toronto: McClelland and Stewart, 1969)
- Selected Poems (Toronto: McClelland and Stewart, 1972)
- Theme and Variations for Sounding Brass (Sherbrooke, P.Q.: Progressive Publications, 1972)
- Fire on Stone (Toronto: McClelland and Stewart, 1974)
- Corners in the Glass (Toronto: McClelland and Stewart, 1977)
- Soviet Poems: Sept. 13 to Oct. 5, 1976 (Winnipeg: Turnstone, 1978)
- Gradations of Grandeur: a Poem (Victoria: Sono Nis, 1979)
- Sequences: Poems (Windsor, Ont.: Black Moss, 1979)
- Landscape with Rain (Toronto: McClelland and Stewart, 1980)
- Nine Poems (Toronto: League of Canadian Poets, 1980)
- The Remarkable Heavens (Lantzville, B.C.: Oolichan Books, 1980)
- Conflicts of Spring (Toronto: McClelland and Stewart, 1981)
- Dentelle / Indented: Poems (Trans. Roland Sutherland, et al. Colorado Springs, Colorado: Colorado College Press, 1982)
- The Moment is All: Selected Poems, 1944-83 (Toronto: McClelland and Stewart, 1983)
- Solidarnosc: Prelude (Sherbrooke, Que.: Progressive Publications, 1983)
- At the Ocean's Verge: Selected Poems (Ed. John Walsh. Literary Series. Redding Ridge, Conn.: Black Swan, 1984)
- Directives of Autumn (Toronto: McClelland and Stewart, 1984)
- Impromptus (Lantzville, B.C.: Oolichan Books, 1984)
- Twelve Landscapes (Toronto: Shaw Street, 1985)
- Manipulations on Greek Themes: Poems (Toronto: Ascham, 1986)
- Collected Poems (Victoria, B.C.: Sono Nis, 1987)
- Winter Prophecies (Toronto: McClelland and Stewart, 1987)
- The Celestial Corkscrew and Other Strategies (Oakville, Ont.: Mosaic, 1989)
- Shadows in the Grass: Poems (Toronto: McClelland and Stewart, 1991)
- Configurations at Midnight (Toronto: ECW, 1992)
- Collected Poems Vol. 3 (Victoria, B.C.: Sono Nis, 1994)
- Tracks in the Snow (Lantzville, B.C.: Oolichan, 1994)
- Visions Fugitive (Montreal: Véhicule Press, 1996)

== See also ==
- List of Bishop's College School alumni
