= Cicely Belle Blain =

Poet and activist

- Born: 1993 or 1994 (age 31–32); London, United Kingdom

Cicely Belle Blain is a poet and activist originally from England and now based in Canada.

== Early life and education ==
Blain was born and raised in London and is of Gambian Wolof, Jamaican and English heritage. When they were in grade 6, Blain and their family moved to a small village in France. The family returned to England afterwards, and Blain attended secondary school in London. They were awarded an International Leader of Tomorrow Award scholarship to study at the University of British Columbia in Vancouver, graduating with a Bachelor of Arts (BA) in modern European studies and Russian in 2016. Blain also has a certificate in new media journalism from Simon Fraser University.

== Career ==
Before launching their own business, Blain worked with Qmunity, an LGBT resource centre in Vancouver. Blain co-founded Black Lives Matter Vancouver in 2016. Blain is the CEO of the DEI consulting firm, originally called Cicely Blain Consulting and now called Bakau Consulting, which they launched in 2018. They offer workshops and courses such as “Intro to Racial Justice” and “Unlearning Anti-Blackness”.

Blain's debut book, a poetry collection titled Burning Sugar, was published in 2020. They are working on "a YA fantasy novel about black justice and queer love".

== Personal life ==
Blain is non-binary and lives in Vancouver.

== Works ==
- Burning Sugar (Arsenal Pulp Press, 2020)

== Awards and nominations ==
Year	Award	Work	Result
2021	Pat Lowther Award	Burning Sugar	Shortlisted
