= Deanna Young =

Canadian poet (born 1964)

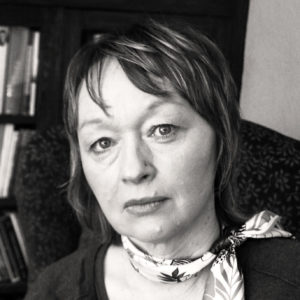
- Young in 2014
- Born: March 30, 1964 (age 62)

Deanna Young (born 30 March 1964) is a Canadian poet.

== Early life and education ==
Born in Lucan, Ontario, Young grew up there, in the nearby city of London, and in neighbouring townships of Middlesex County in Southwestern Ontario.

She has bachelor's degrees from McGill University (English Literature) and Dalhousie University (Education) and a master's degree from Carleton University (English).

She lived in Montreal, Nova Scotia, and Port of Spain, Trinidad, before settling in Ottawa, Ontario.

== Career ==
Young’s first collection of poetry, The Still Before a Storm, was published in 1984.

Poems from her second book of poetry, Drunkard’s Path (2001), won the 1996 Atlantic Writing Competition.

She won the Prism international Poetry Contest in 2013.

She was co-director of the Tree Reading Series (Ottawa) from 2013 to 2016.

Her third book, House Dreams (2014), was shortlisted for the Trillium Book Award for Poetry and the Ottawa Book Award. In a 2014 interview about the book, Young was asked, "Do you have a subject?" She answered, "Much of my work so far is asking, how do we endure and rise from trauma?"

Her most recent book, Reunion (2018), was shortlisted for the Pat Lowther Memorial Award and the Archibald Lampman Award. The poems of Reunion ask the reader to forge connections and reverberations between narrative braids. As in previous books, Young’s language in this book is spare and taut. However here there is a decidedly Gothic feeling to the poems, both in their psychological nature and in the use of the pastoral to further highlight the darkness within the collection.

In 2019 she was appointed English Poet Laureate of Ottawa (Ontario) for a two-year term.

== Works ==
- The Still Before a Storm (Moonstone Press, 1984) ISBN 0-920259-01-4
- Drunkard’s Path (Gaspereau Press, 2001) ISBN 1-894031-44-X (softcover).—ISBN 1-894031-45-8 (bound)
- House Dreams (Brick Books, 2014) ISBN 978-1-9268-29-91-3
- Reunion (Brick Books, 2018) ISBN 978-1-77131-488-6 (softcover). ISBN 978-1-77131-490-9 (PDF). ISBN 978-1-77131-489-3 (EPUB)
