= Hilary Clark =

Canadian poet (born 1955)

- Born: 1955 (age 70–71)
- Education: Simon Fraser University (BA); University of Toronto (MA); University of British Columbia (PhD)
- Occupation: Poet
- Writing career
- Notable awards: Pat Lowther Award (1999)

Hilary Anne Clark (born 1955) is a Canadian poet.

== Life ==
Graduated from Simon Fraser University (BA Hons English), University of Toronto (MA Comparative Literature), and University of British Columbia (PhD Comparative Literature).

Taught English at the University of Saskatchewan from 1990 to 2015.

== Awards ==
- 1999 Saskatchewan Book Award for Poetry
- 1999 Pat Lowther Award
- 2006 co-winner, bpNichol Chapbook Award

== Works ==
=== Poetry ===
- Hilary Clark (1998). Two Heavens. Hagios Press. ISBN 978-0-9682256-1-5.
- Hilary Clark (1998). More Light. Brick Books. ISBN 978-0-919626-98-0.
- Hilary Clark (2003). The Dwelling of Weather. Brick Books. ISBN 978-1-894078-26-9.
- Hilary Clark; Steven Smith; Betsy Rosenwald (2005). Pliny's Knickers, Book One. JackPine Press. ISBN 978-0-9735518-7-7.

=== Non-fiction ===
- Joseph Adamson; Hilary Clark, eds. (1999). Scenes of shame: psychoanalysis, shame, and writing. SUNY Press. ISBN 978-0-7914-3975-3.
- Hilary Clark, ed. (2008). Depression and narrative: telling the dark. SUNY Press. ISBN 978-0-7914-7569-0.
- Hilary Clark (2011). The Fictional Encyclopedia. Routledge reprints. 1990. ISBN 978-0-4156-6833-0.
