= Our Lives: Canada's First Black Women's Newspaper =

Canadian newspaper

- Founders: Carol Allain; Dionne Brand; Linda Carty; Afua Cooper; Faith Nolan
- Publisher: Black Women's Collective
- Founded: 1986
- Ceased publication: 1989
- Political alignment: Black feminist, left
- Language: English
- Headquarters: Toronto, Canada
- Free online archives: Rise Up! Feminist Archive

Our Lives: Canada's First Black Women's Newspaper was the first newspaper in Canada written by and about Black women. Founded in 1986 by the Black Women's Collective, Our Lives sought to represent the lives, achievements, and struggles of Black women in Canada.

== Background ==
=== The Black press and anti-Black racism in print ===
Black activism in print in Canada began with anti-enslavement publications such as The Provincial Freeman that sought to counter the anti-Black racism prevalent in the Canadian press. Our Lives cultivated this history by “create[ing] a free space, a place where [they] can talk as sisters”, and analyze their experiences with institutional racism, gendered racism, and anti-Black violence. This dedication to Black women representation was part of a broader movement in the 1980s that centered "Black women's experiences, writings, and cultural production...to validate the lives of these women...and ...make them visible to the wider public".

=== Racial uplift and Black consciousness ===
Our Lives was situated in a period of heightened racial unrest that produced actions like the Sir George Williams and Yonge Street uprisings. They spoke, and contributed, to this moment by celebrating Black womanhood and by honouring Black women revolutionaries such as Marie Joseph Angelique, Harriet Tubman, and Anne Cools.

== See also ==
- Black Canadians
