= Nicole Brossard =

French-Canadian formalist poet and novelist

Nicole Brossard OC CQ
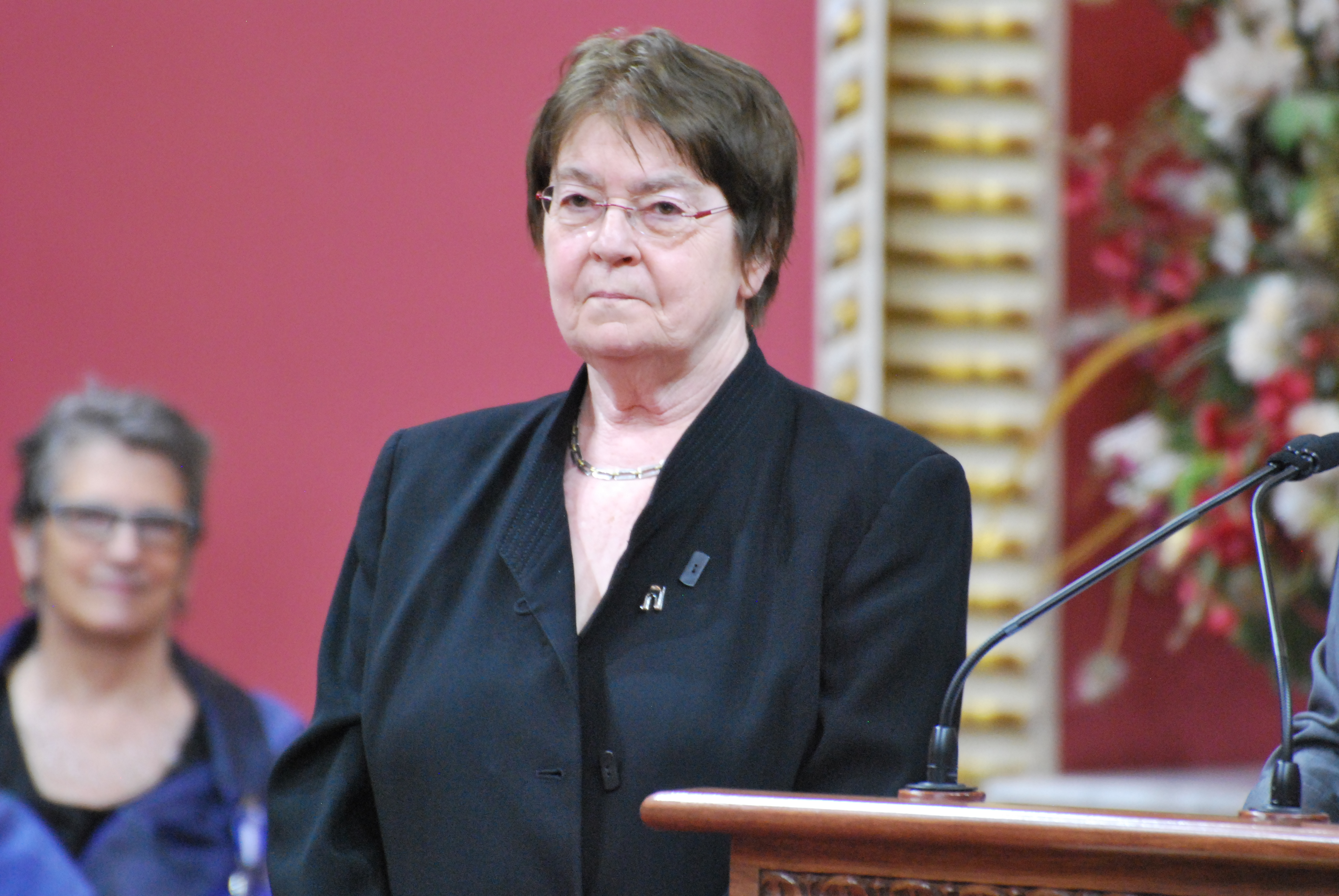
- Nicole Brossard at the award ceremony for the National Order of Quebec in June 2013
- Born: November 27, 1943 (age 82); Montreal, Quebec, Canada
- Occupation: Writer
- Known for: Poet and novelist

Nicole Brossard OC CQ (born November 27, 1943) is a French-Canadian formalist poet and novelist. Her work is known for exploration of feminist themes and for challenging masculine-oriented language and points of view in French literature.

She lives in Outremont, a suburb of Montreal, Canada.

== Early life ==
Brossard was born in Montreal, Quebec. She attended Collège Marguerite Bourgeoys and the Université de Montréal.

== Career ==
Brossard wrote her first collection in 1965, Aube à la saison. The collection L'Echo bouge beau marked a break in the evolution of her poetry that included an open and active participation in many literary and cultural events, including poetry recitals.

In 1975, she participated in a meeting of writers on women, after which she began to take an activist role in the feminist movement, and to write poetry with a more personal and subjective tone. Her writing includes sensual, aesthetic and feminist political content.

Brossard co-founded a feminist newspaper, Les têtes de pioches, with France Théoret. She wrote a play Le nef des sorcières (first performed in 1976).

In 1982, she founded a publishing house: L'Intégrale éditrice. Brossard's poetry collection, Double Impression, won the 1984 Governor General's Award. In 1987 her romance novel, Le désert mauve, was published.

The Nicole Brossard archives are located in downtown Montreal at the Bibliothèque et Archives nationales du Québec. and at Library and Archives Canada.

In April 2019, Brossard was announced as the 2019 Griffin Lifetime Recognition Award recipient.

== Awards ==
- 1974: Governor General's Award for Poetry
- 1984: Governor General's Award for Poetry
- 1991: Prix Athanase-David
- 1991: Harbour Festival Prize
- 2019: America Award in Literature for a lifetime contribution to international writing

== Selected bibliography ==
- Aube à la saison - 1965
- Mordre en sa chair - 1966
- L'écho bouge beau - 1968
- Suite logique - 1970
- Un livre - 1970 (translated in English as A Book)
- Le centre blanc - 1970
- Mécanique jongleuse - 1974 (translated in English as Day-Dream Mechanics; winner of the 1974 Governor General's Award for Poetry)
- La partie pour le tout - 1975
- Sold-Out, étreinte / illustration - (1973) 1977
- L'amèr ou le Chapitre effrité - 1977(translated in English as These Our Mothers)
- French kiss, étreinte / exploration - (1974) 1979
- Les sens apparent - 1980 (translated in English as Surfaces of Sense)
- Amantes - 1980 (translated in English as Lovhers; nominated for a Governor General's Award)
- Journal intime - 1984
- Double impression - 1984 (winner of the 1984 Governor General's Award for Poetry)
- Domaine d'écriture - 1985
- La lettre aérienne - 1985 (translated in English as The Aerial Letter)
- Le désert mauve - 1987 (translated in English as Mauve Desert)
- L'amer - 1988
- Installations: avec sans pronoms - 1989
- A tout regard - 1989
- La nuit verte du parc labyrinthe - 1992
- Langues obscures - 1992
- Baroque d'aube - 1995 (translated in English as Baroque at Dawn)
- Vertige de l'avant-scène - 1997 (nominated for a Governor General's Award)
- Au présent des veins - 1999
- Musée de l'os et de l'eau - 1999 (translated into English as Museum of Bone and Water; nominated for a Governor General's Award;)
- Hier - 2001 (translated in English as Yesterday, at the Hotel Clarendon)
- Cahier de roses & de civilisation - 2003 (nominated for a Governor General's Award)

English translations

- These Our Mothers- 1983; translated by Barbara Godard
- Baroque at Dawn - 1997
- Museum of Bone and Water - 2005
- Fluid Arguments - 2005
- Yesterday, at the Hotel Clarendon - 2006
- Picture Theory - 2006
- Mauve Desert - 2006
- Notebook of Roses and Civilization - 2007; translation by Robert Majzels and Erín Moure, shortlisted for the 2008 Canadian Griffin Poetry Prize
- Fences in Breathing - 2009
- Nicole Brossard: Selections - 2010; edited by Jennifer Moxley for the series: Poets for the Millennium from University of California Press
- White Piano - 2013; translation by Robert Majzels and Erín Moure, shortlisted for the 2014 Best Translated Book Award

== See also ==
- Canadian literature
- Canadian poetry
- List of Canadian poets
- List of writers from Quebec
