= Chus Pato =

Galician writer

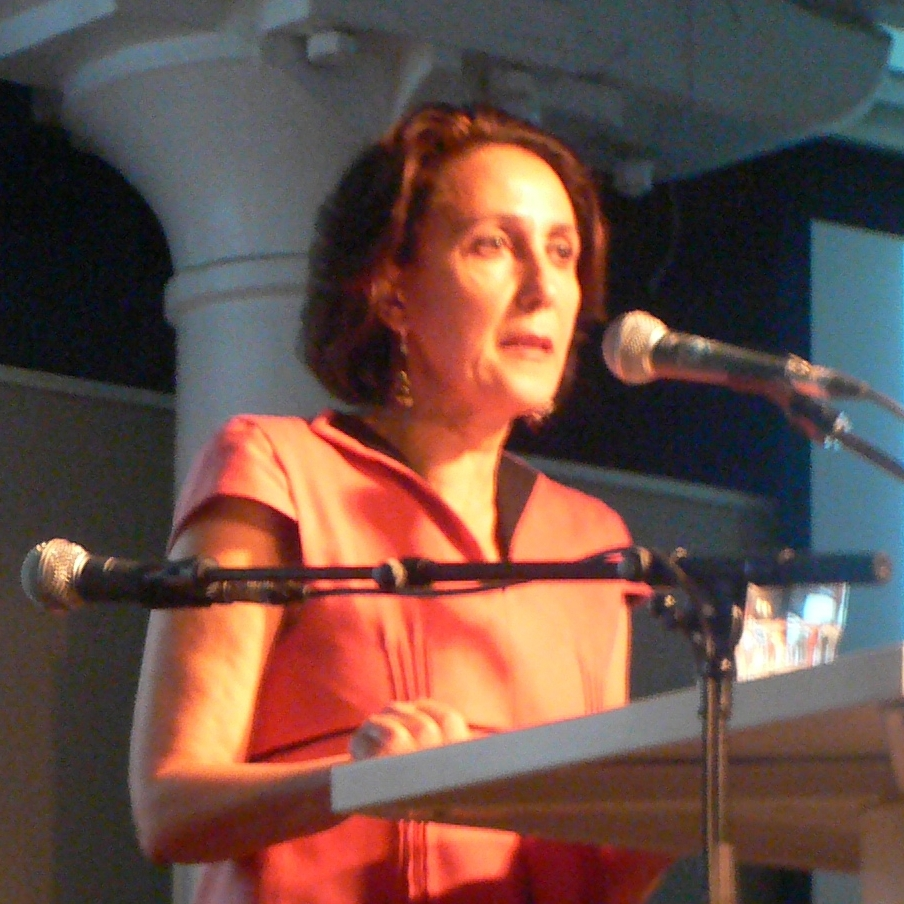
Chus Pato at an Antwerp poetry festival, 2012

María Xesús Pato Díaz (born 29 August 1955 in Ourense, Galicia), most commonly known as Chus Pato, is a Galician writer.

She became a member of the Royal Galician Academy in 2016.

== Bibliography ==
=== Galician language ===
- Urania. Ourense: Calpurnia (1991)
- Heloísa. A Coruña: Espiral Maior (1994)
- Fascinio. Muros: Toxosoutos (1995)
- A ponte das poldras. Santiago de Compostela: Noitarenga (1996). 2nd ed., Vigo: Galaxia (2006)
- Nínive. Vigo: Xerais (1996)
- m-Talá. Vigo: Xerais (2000)
- Charenton. Vigo: Xerais (2004)
- Hordas de escritura. Vigo: Xerais (2008)
- Secesión. Vigo: Galaxia (2009).
- Nacer é unha república de árbores. Pontevedra: Do Cumio (2010)
- Carne de Leviatán. Vigo: Galaxia (2013).
- Un libre favor. Vigo: Galaxia (2019).
- Sonora. Vigo: Xerais (2023).

=== English translations ===
- From M-Talá. Vancouver: Nomados (2002)
- Charenton. Exeter: Shearsman Books (2007)
- m-Talá. Exeter: Shearsman Books (2009)
- Hordes of Writing, Exeter: Shearsman Books (2011)
- Secession, (a dual publication with Erín Moure's Insecession), Toronto: BookThug (2014).
- Flesh of Leviatan, Omnidawn Publishing (2016).
- The Face of the Quarzes, Veliz Books (2021).
- Sonora, Veliz Books (2026).

=== Dutch translations ===
- Finisterra. Uitgeverij Perdu, 2017.

=== Portuguese translations ===
- Carne de Leviatã. Lisboa: Douda Correria, 2016.
- Um fémur de voz corre a galope [antologia]. Porto: Officium Lectionis, 2022.

=== Bulgarian translations ===
- Leviatan i drugi istorii. Small Stations, 2016.

=== French translations ===
- Chair de Léviathan. Alger: Apic éditions, 2024.

== Awards ==
- Premio Losada Diéguez in 1997 for Nínive.
- Spanish Critic Prize in 2009 for Hordas de escritura.
- Premio Losada Diéguez in 2009 for Hordas de escritura
- Author of the Year in 2014 from the Galician Booksellers' Association.
- National Poetry Award in 2024 for Sonora
