= Heather Spears =

Canadian-born writer, artist, and sculptor (1934–2021)

- Born: September 29, 1934; Vancouver, British Columbia, Canada
- Died: April 15, 2021 (aged 86)
- Education: Emily Carr University of Art and Design; University of British Columbia; University of Copenhagen; Panum Institute
- Known for: Poetry, drawings, novels
- Awards: Pat Lowther Award (1987, 1989, 2000); Governor General's Literary Award for Poetry (1989)
- Website: heatherspears.com

Heather Spears (September 29, 1934 – April 15, 2021) was a Canadian-born poet, novelist, artist, sculptor, and educator. She resided in Denmark from 1962 until her death in Copenhagen in 2021. She returned to Canada annually to conduct speaking and reading tours and to teach drawing and head-sculpting workshops. She published eleven collections of poetry, five novels, and three volumes of drawings. She specialized in drawing premature infants and "infants in crisis".

== Early life, education, and family ==
Heather Spears was born in 1934 in Vancouver, British Columbia, Canada. The daughter of Robert and Dorothea Spears, she was born to her father's second wife and had two brothers and a half-sister.

She began drawing at the age of 5. She received her formal training at the Emily Carr University of Art and Design in Vancouver and the University of British Columbia. After graduating from university, she traveled on an Emily Carr Scholarship to study art in Europe for two years. There she met a fellow Canadian, Leonard "Lenny" Goldenberg, a ceramist. They married and had three sons.

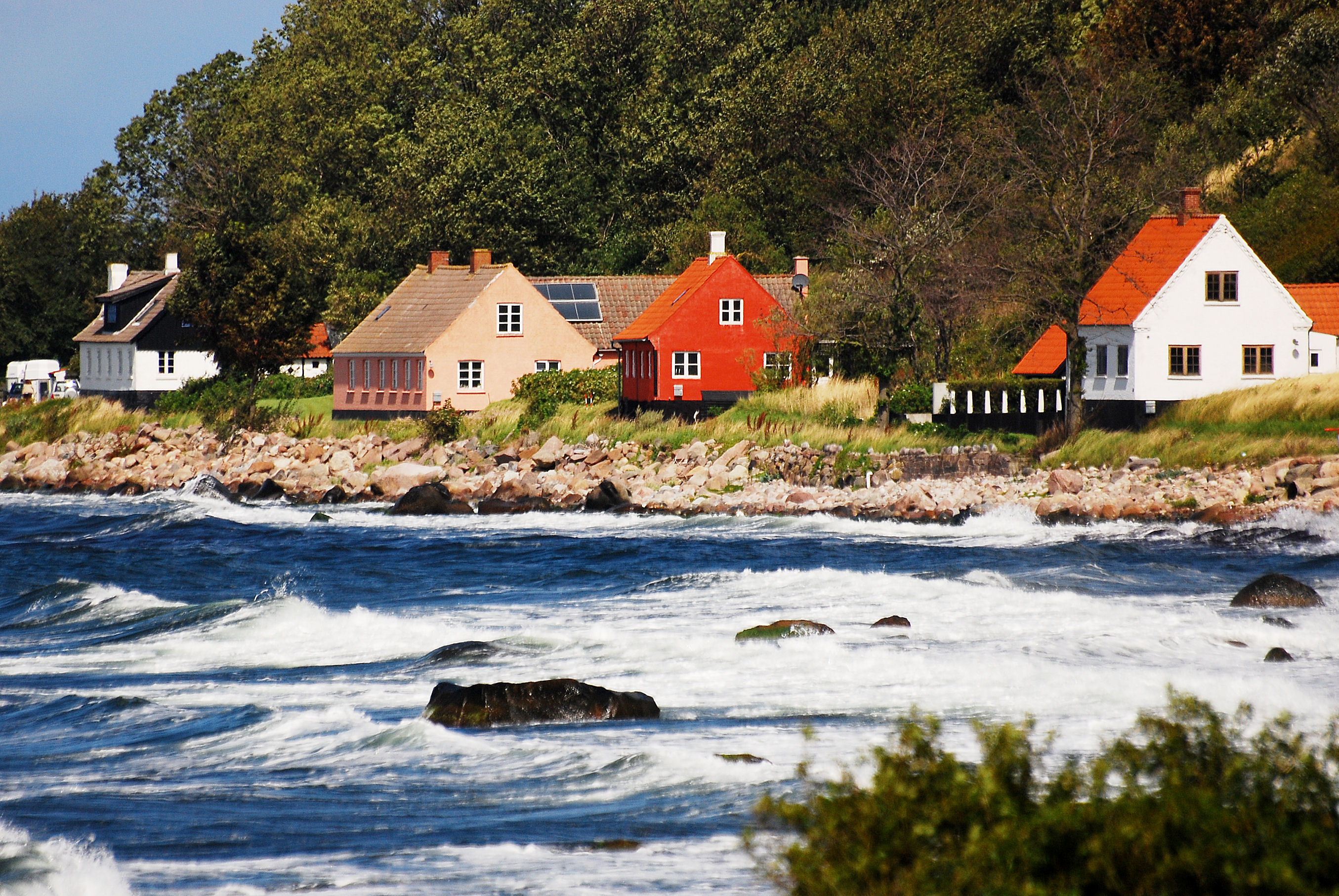
Bornholm

In 1962, the family moved from Canada to Denmark for a year so Goldenberg could study Danish pottery-making. They lived on the island of Bornholm, which had a large tourist trade. The family remained in Denmark from a combination of "poverty, put-it-offness and apathy", remaining in the country even after the couple divorced. Spears learned Danish but continued to speak English at home. She studied anatomical drawing at the Panum Institute and Arabic at the University of Copenhagen.

After her children grew up, Spears began returning to Canada annually to conduct reading and speaking tours, and teach drawing and head-sculpting workshops.

She died in Copenhagen on April 15, 2021.

== Work ==
=== Poetry ===
Spears published her first book of poetry, Asylum Poems and Others, in 1958. Canadian literary critic Northrop Frye called it "[a] most disconcerting and haunting little book". Her poems are generally classified as "non-genre". She often combined poetry and art, as in her books Drawings from the Newborn, The Panum Poems, and Required Reading, which present both poems and line drawings, and Line by Line, which depicts drawings of Canadian poets along with sample poems. Her poem "The Danish Portraits" lyricizes the thoughts of a painter on his relationship to his portrait subjects.

=== Novels ===
Spears wrote a science fiction trilogy about conjoined twins, and a crime fiction novel.

=== Drawings ===
Premature babies have never been drawn before. In the time of the Masters, when they were studying human subjects these babies weren't around. Their movements are different, their shape is different—everything about them is different—so you can't use your knowledge of the human anatomy that you learned at school.

— Heather Spears

To support her children as a single parent in Bornholm, Spears sold oil paintings and drawings, and also taught. She catered to the summer tourist trade by sketching individual and family portraits. At first she had difficulty drawing babies' faces, so she honed her skill by sketching infants in a local hospital at night. She became fascinated by premature infants, a subject she had not learned about in her anatomy classes, and produced many pencil and chalk drawings of preterm infants in the neonatal intensive care unit. She also studied infant muscle structure and began modeling babies' heads in clay. Later she traveled to maternity and neonatal intensive care wards in hospitals in North America, England, Sweden, and the Middle East, to sketch women in childbirth and critically ill newborns.

Spears began accepting private commissions from parents to draw their stillborns and babies who had died after birth. She was invited to serve as artist-in-residence at the Dalhousie University medical school in Halifax, Nova Scotia, in 1998. During her time there, she produced about 50 drawings of babies and older children at the IWK Health Centre. In 2016, she mounted an exhibition at the John Radcliffe Hospital in Oxford called "Drawing the First Breath", showcasing sketches of more than 100 childbirths and 25 neonatal infants that she had drawn over the previous three decades. Spears also taught head-sculpting and exhibited her sculptures.

In addition to her infant portraits, Spears sketched dancers, musicians, athletes, and lecturers. She also did courtroom drawings. Among the cases she documented are the Reena Virk murder trial and the Midwifery Trial.

In spring 1989, during the First Intifada, Spears spent six weeks in the Palestinian National Authority to draw children injured in the conflict. She funded her trip with $1,000 in grants from the Canadian Council of Churches and a peace fund in Denmark. Spears produced 300 pencil and chalk drawings of wounded children in hospitals, surgeries, refugee camps, West Bank villages, and military courts. A diplomat helped her take the drawings out of the country. She published 75 of the drawings in a paperback book titled Drawn from the Fire – Children of the Intifada, which includes an Arabic-language explanation of how each child was wounded. Spears gave slide presentations of the drawings before schools and peace groups to initiate discussion of the Arab–Israeli conflict; however, her public school lectures were often cancelled after complaints by parents that her presentation lacks "balance".

Spears owned the Galleri Upper Canada in Copenhagen.

== Memberships ==
Spears held memberships in the League of Canadian Poets, Writers' Union of Canada, and SF Canada; the Society of Authors; and Tegnernes Forbund, the Danish Graphic Artist's Federation.

== Awards and honours ==
Spears won three Pat Lowther Awards – for her 1986 poetry collection How to Read Faces, her 1988 poetry collection The Word for Sand, and her 2000 book of drawings Required Reading: A witness in words and drawings to the Reena Virk Trials, 1998–2000. The Word for Sand was also the winner of the Governor General's Literary Award for Poetry. In 2016, Spears received a Naji Naaman Literary Prize (honour prize for complete work).

== Personal life ==
Spears was divorced from Leonard Goldenberg (born 1937), a native of Montreal, with whom she had three sons. One of their sons, Daniel Goldenberg (born 1960 in Canada), is a self-taught artist living and working in Copenhagen.

The University of British Columbia is the repository for the Heather Spears archive.

== Bibliography ==
=== Poetry ===
- Asylum Poems and Others. Emblem Books. 1958.
- The Danish Portraits. Ryerson Press. 1967.
- From the Inside. Fiddlehead Poetry Books. 1972. ISBN 9780919197046.
- How to Read Faces (1986)
- The Word for Sand (4th ed.). Wolsak and Wynn. 1988. ISBN 9780919897106.
- Human Acts. Wolsak and Wynn. 1991. ISBN 9780919897243.
- The Panum Poems: Drawings and Stories. Ekstasis Editions. 1996. ISBN 9780921215936.
- Poems Selected and New. Wolsak and Wynn. 1998. ISBN 9780919897618.

=== Novels ===
- Moonfall. Beach Holme Publishers. 1991. ISBN 9780888783066.
- The Children of Atwar (1993)
- The Taming. Tesseract Books. 1996. ISBN 9781895836233.
- The Flourish: Murder in the Family. Ekstasis Editions. 2003. ISBN 9781894800365. (republished in England as A Muted Voice, 2009)

=== Drawings ===
- Drawings from the Newborn: Poems and Drawings of Infants in Crisis. Ben-Simon Publications. 1986. ISBN 9780914539025.
- Drawn from the Fire, Children of the Intifada (1989)
- Massacre, Drawings from Jerusalem (1990)
- Required Reading: A witness in words and drawings to the Reena Virk Trials, 1998–2000. Wolsak and Wynn. 2000. ISBN 9780919897700.
- Line by Line: An Anthology of Contemporary Canadian Poets. Ekstasis Editions. 2002. ISBN 9781896860503.
- The Creative Eye: An artist's guide to unlocking the mysteries of visual perception. Arcturus. 2007. ISBN 9780572033156. (illustrated edition pub. 2012)
- I Can Still Draw. Wolsak & Wynn. 2008. ISBN 9781894987271.
