= Alexandra Oliver =

Canadian poet (born 1970)

- Born: Alexandra Edith Amelia Oliver; 1970 (age 55–56) Vancouver, British Columbia, Canada
- Occupation: Poet
- Education: University of Toronto (MA, 1992); University of Southern Maine (MFA, 2012); McMaster University (PhD)
- Period: 1990s–present
- Notable awards: Pat Lowther Award (2014)
- Spouse: Dragan Basekic

Website
- Official website

Alexandra Edith Amelia Basekic (née Oliver; born 1970) is a Canadian poet. She began as a Vancouver-based slam poet in the early 1990s, and appeared in the 1998 documentary film SlamNation. Oliver won the 2014 Pat Lowther Award for her collection Meeting the Tormentors in Safeway.

As of 2025, Oliver is an instructor at OCAD University.

== Early life and education ==
Alexandra Edith Amelia Oliver was born in Vancouver in 1970.

She received a Master of Arts in drama from the University of Toronto in 1992, a Master of Fine Arts from the University of Southern Maine's Stonecoast MFA Program in Creative Writing in 2012, and a Doctor of Philosophy in English and cultural studies from McMaster University.

== Awards and honours ==
CBC Books included Hail the Invisible Watchman on their list of the "best Canadian poetry of 2022".

Awards for Oliver's work
Year	Work	Award	Result	Ref.
2014	Meeting the Tormentors in Safeway	Pat Lowther Award	Winner	
2017	Let the Empire Down	Pat Lowther Award	Shortlist	

== Personal life ==
She is married to engineer Dragan Basekic, and she is a parent.

== Publications ==
- Meeting the Tormentors in Safeway (2013)
- Measure for Measure: An Anthology of Poetic Meters, co-editor with Annie Finch (2015)
- Let the Empire Down (2016)
- On the Oven Sits a Maiden (chapbook) (2018)
- Hail the Invisible Watchman (2022)
