= Lesley Belleau =

Anishinaabe writer from Canada

- Born: 1976 (age 49–50); Garden River First Nation, Ontario, Canada
- Education: University of Windsor (MA)
- Writing career
- Notable awards: Pat Lowther Award; 2018 Indianland

Lesley Belleau is an Anishinaabe writer from Canada. She is most noted for her 2017 poetry collection Indianland, which won the Pat Lowther Award in 2018.

She is a member of the Garden River First Nation near Sault Ste. Marie, Ontario. She earned a Master of Arts in English Literature and Creative Writing at the University of Windsor, and is a PhD candidate in Indigenous studies at Trent University. As of 2022, she was a Pre-Doctoral Fellow at Queen's University.
