= Erín Moure =

Canadian poet and translator of verse (born 1955)

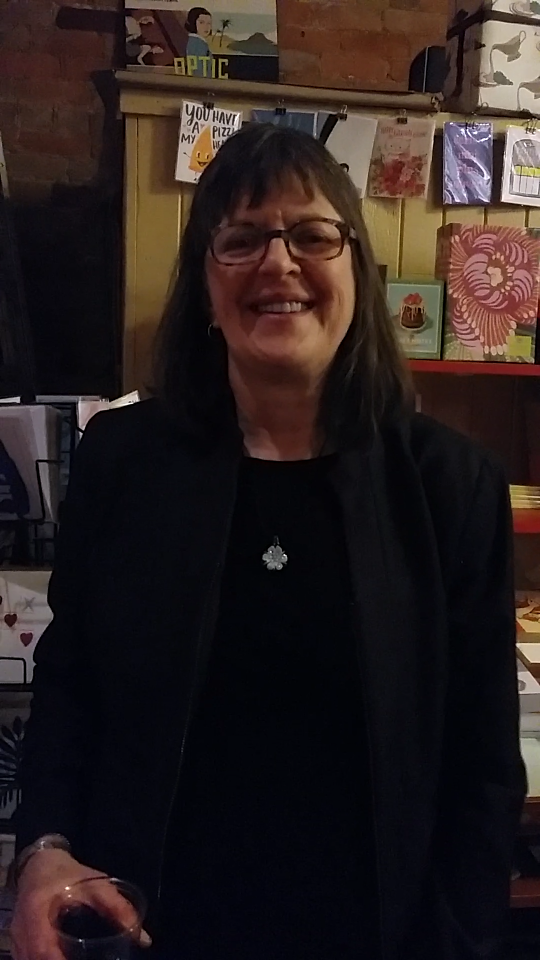
- Erin Mouré photographed in Montreal, Quebec, Canada inside the Drawn & Quarterly Bookstore.
- Born: 17 April 1955 (age 71); Calgary, Alberta
- Occupations: Writer, poet, translator
- Writing career
- Notable works: WSW, Furious
- Website: brocku.ca/canadianwomenpoets/Moure.htm

Erín Moure (born 1955 in Calgary, Alberta) is a Canadian poet and translator with eighteen books of poetry, a co-authored book of poetry, a volume of essays, a book of articles on translation, a poetics, and two memoirs.

She has translated or co-translated twenty-one books of poetry and two of biopoetics from French, Spanish, Galician, Portuguese, and Ukrainian, by poets such as Nicole Brossard (with Robert Majzels), Andrés Ajens, Chantal Neveu, Rosalía de Castro, Chus Pato, Uxío Novoneyra, Lupe Gómez (with Rebeca Lema Martínez and on her own), Fernando Pessoa, and Yuri Izdryk (with Roman Ivashkiv).

Three of her own books have been translated; one of each in German, Galician, and French. Her work has received the Governor General’s Award twice, Pat Lowther Memorial Award, A. M. Klein Prize twice, has been a three-time finalist for the Griffin Prize and three-time finalist in the US for a Best Translated Book Award (Poetry).

Her latest literary work is The Elements (2019) and Theophylline: an a-poretic migration will appear in 2023. Her work is rooted in a philosophical mix that accepts mystery, not always immediately accessible.

She has won several prizes, including the Governor General's Award twice.

== Early and personal life ==
Her mother was born in 1924 in present-day western Ukraine, and emigrated to Canada in 1929. Her father, born in Ottawa, Ontario in 1925 was a great-grandson of the painter George Théodore Berthon. Erín Moure is the oldest of three, having two younger brothers.

In 1975, Moure moved to Vancouver, British Columbia, where she took her second year classes at the University of British Columbia in philosophy. After only one academic year, she left the University of British Columbia and got a job at Via Rail Canada where she continued to write poetry. This is where she learned French.

She learned Galician in the early 21st century in order to translate the poetry of Chus Pato. She also translates from Portuguese, Spanish and English.

She lives in Montreal, Quebec.

== Writing and style ==
During an interview in the early 1990s, she has cited four major influences which led her to become a writer, other than the work of other writers or poets: "Landscape of cars, her mother going to work, her mother teaching her to read, and in a small way losing her sense of touch."

Many years ago, Melissa Jacques wrote, "Erin Moure's poetry is fragmented, meta-critical, and explicitly deconstructive. Folding everyday events and ordinary people into complex and often irresolvable philosophical dilemmas, Moure challenges the standards of accessibility and common sense. Not surprisingly, her work has met with a mixed response. Critics are often troubled by the difficult and therefore alienating nature of the writing; even amongst Moure's advocates, the issues of accessibility and political efficacy are recurrent themes."

Moure has been nominated for and won several literary awards for her writing and her translation. These include the Pat Lowther Memorial Award, the Governor General's Award for poetry, the A. M. Klein Prize for Poetry, the Best Translated Book Award for poetry, and the Nelson Ball Prize.

Her most recent poetry book, The Elements, appeared in 2019.

== Awards and honours ==
- 1988 Governor General's Award for English-language poetry for the volume Furious.
- 2014 Best Translated Book Award, poetry, shortlist for White Piano by Nicole Brossard, from the French
- Griffin Poetry Prize biography
- 2017 Harvard University 2017 WPR Creative fellowship, RESONANCE: A MODERNISM with Erin Moure
- 2021 Governor General's Award for French to English translation - This Radiant Life (Chantal Neveu, La vie radieuse)

== Works of poetry ==
- Empire, York Street, Toronto: House of Anansi Press, 1979 (nominated for a Governor General's Award)
- The Whisky Vigil, Madeira Park, BC: Harbour Publishing, 1981
- Wanted Alive, Toronto: House of Anansi Press, 1983
- Domestic Fuel, Toronto: House of Anansi Press, 1985 (winner of the Pat Lowther Award)
- Furious, Toronto: House of Anansi Press, 1988 (winner of the 1988 Governor General's Award for poetry)
- WSW, Montreal: Véhicule Press, 1989 (winner of the A. M. Klein Prize for Poetry
- Sheepish Beauty, Civilian Love, Montreal: Véhicule Press, 1992
- The Green Word: Selected Poems: 1973–1992, Toronto: Oxford University Press, 1994
- Search Procedures, Toronto: House of Anansi Press, 1996 (nominated for a Governor General's Award)
- A Frame of the Book, Toronto: House of Anansi Press, 1999
- Pillage Laud, Montreal: Moveable Type Books, 1999
- O Cidadán, Toronto: House of Anansi Press, 2002 (nominated for a Governor General's Award)
- Little Theatres, Toronto: House of Anansi Press, 2005 (winner of the A. M. Klein Prize for Poetry, nominated for a Governor General's Award, nominated for the Pat Lowther Award, shortlisted for the 2006 Canadian Griffin Poetry Prize)
- O Cadoiro, Toronto: House of Anansi Press, 2007
- Expeditions of a Chimæra (collaboration with Oana Avasilichioaei), Toronto: Book*hug Press, 2009 (shortlisted for the 2011 A. M. Klein Prize for Poetry)
- O Resplandor, Toronto: House of Anansi Press, 2010 (shortlisted for the 2011 A. M. Klein Prize for Poetry)
- The Unmemntioable, Toronto: House of Anansi Press, 2012
- Insecession a dual book with Chus Pato's Secession, Toronto: Book*hug Press, 2014
- Kapusta, Toronto: House of Anansi Press, 2015
- The Elements, Toronto: House of Anansi Press, 2019

== Translations from other languages ==
- Installations – 2000, translation with Robert Majzels from French of Nicole Brossard's Installations
- Sheep's Vigil by a Fervent Person translation from Portuguese of Fernando Pessoa / Alberto Caeiro's O Guardador de Rebanhos- 2001 (shortlisted for the 2002 Canadian Griffin Poetry Prize)
- Museum of Bone and Water – 2003, translation with Robert Majzels from French of Nicole Brossard's Musée de l'os et de l'eau
- Notebook of Roses and Civilization – 2007, translation with Robert Majzels from French of Nicole Brossard's Cahier de roses & de civilisation (nominated for a Governor General's Award; shortlisted for the 2008 Canadian Griffin Poetry Prize)
- Charenton – 2007, translation from Galician of Chus Pato's Charenton
- Quase Flanders, Quase Extremadura – 2008, translation from Spanish of excerpts from the poetry of Andrés Ajens
- m-Talá – 2009, translation from Galician of Chus Pato's m-Talá
- Hordes of Writing – 2011, translation from Galician of Chus Pato's Hordas de escritura
- Just Like Her – 2011, translation from French of Louise Dupré's Tout come elle
- White Piano – 2013, translation with Robert Majzels from French of Nicole Brossard's Piano blanc
- Galician Songs – 2013, translation from Galician of Rosalia de Castro's Cantares Gallegos
- Secession – 2014, translation from Galician of Chus Pato's Secesión
- Flesh of Leviathan – 2016, translation from Galician of Chus Pato's Carne de Leviatán
- New Leaves – 2016, translation from Galician of Rosalia de Castro's Follas Novas
- My Dinosaur – 2016, translation from French of François Turcot's Mon dinosaure
- Paraguayan Sea – 2017, translated from Portunhol and Guarani to Frenglish and Guarani of Wilson Bueno's Mar paraguayo
- Camouflage – 2019, translated from Galician of Lupe Gómez's Camuflaxe
- The Uplands: Book of the Courel and other poems – 2020, translated from Galician of Uxío Novoneyra's Os Eidos and other poems
- This Radiant Life – 2020, translated from French of Chantal Neveu's La vie radieuse
- The Face of the Quartzes – 2021, translated from Galician of Chus Pato's Un libre favor

== Essays, letters and memoirs ==
- Two Women Talking: Correspondence 1985–1987 – 1994 (with Bronwen Wallace)
- My Beloved Wager essays – 2009
- Sitting Shiva on Minto Avenue, by Toots, Vancouver: New Star Books, 2017
- A Century in the North Peace: Life and Times of Anne and John Callison, Montreal: Zat-So Productions, 2018

== See also ==
- Canadian literature
- Canadian poetry
- List of Canadian poets
