= 1974 Governor General's Awards =

Canadian literary award

Each winner of the 1974 Governor General's Awards for Literary Merit was selected by a panel of judges administered by the Canada Council for the Arts. The winners were given a $2500 cash prize. Two awardees, Victor-Lévy Beaulieu and Nicole Brossard, interrupted the award ceremony by giving speeches supporting Quebec nationalism.

== Winners ==
=== English Language ===
- Fiction: Margaret Laurence, The Diviners.
- Poetry or Drama: Ralph Gustafson, Fire on Stone.
- Non-Fiction: Charles Ritchie, The Siren Years.

=== French Language ===
- Fiction: Victor-Lévy Beaulieu, Don Quichotte de la démanche.
- Poetry or Drama: Nicole Brossard, Mécanique jongleuse suivi de Masculin grammaticale.
- Non-Fiction: Louise Dechêne, Habitants et marchands de Montréal au XVIIe siècle.
