= Dionne Brand =

Canadian writer (born 1953)

Dionne Brand CM FRSC
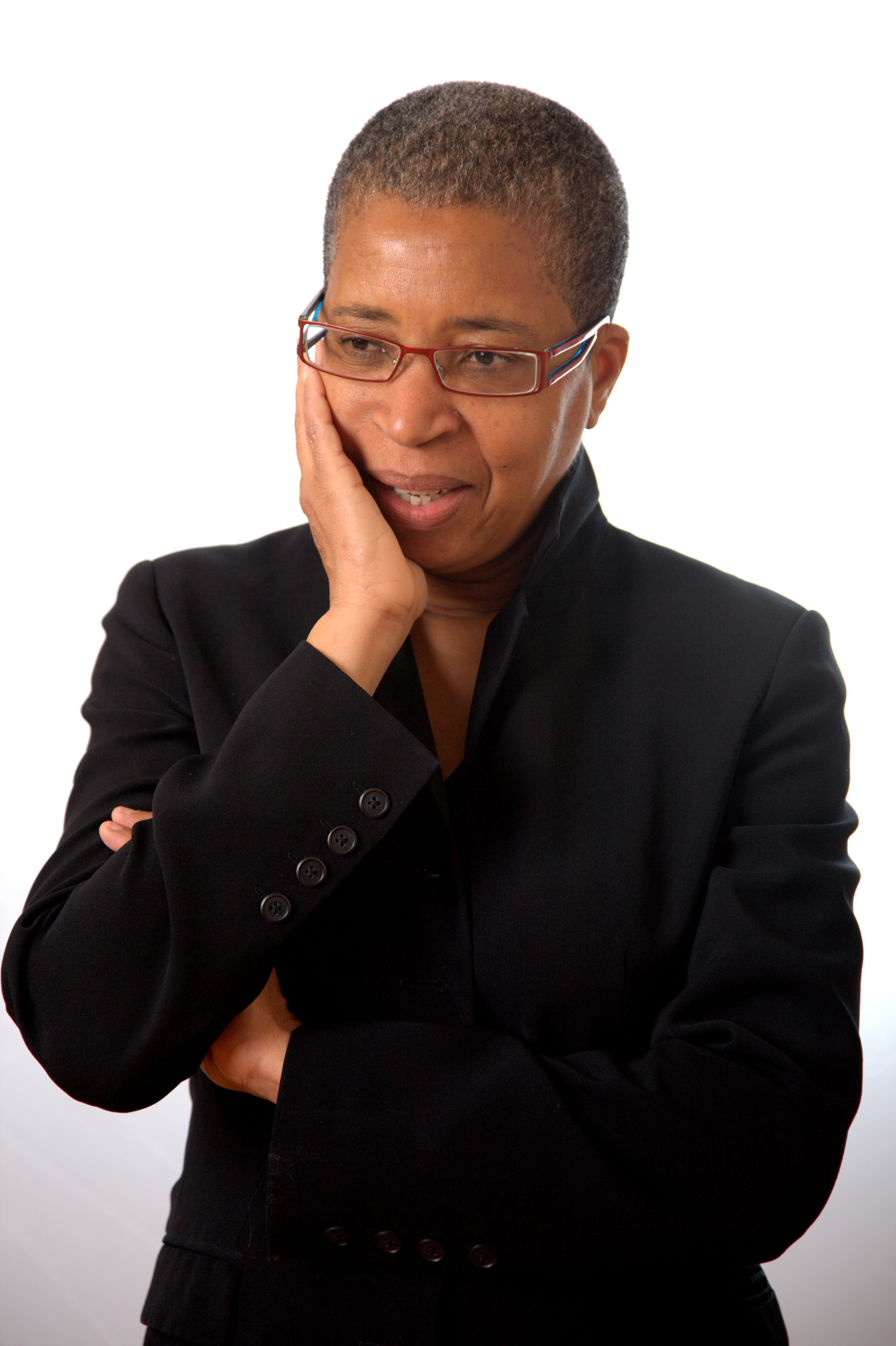
- Brand in 2009
- Born: 7 January 1953 (age 73); Guayaguayare, Trinidad and Tobago
- Education: University of Toronto (BA, MA)
- Occupations: Writer and poet
- Writing career
- Genres: Poetry; Autofiction
- Notable works: Land to Light On; Ossuaries; Salvage: Readings from the Wreck
- Notable awards: Governor General's Award for Poetry (1997); Griffin Poetry Prize (2011); Windham-Campbell Literature Prize (2021); OCM Bocas Prize for Caribbean Literature (2025)

Dionne Brand CM FRSC (born 7 January 1953) is a Canadian poet, novelist, essayist and documentarian. She was Toronto's third poet laureate from September 2009 to November 2012 and its first Black poet laureate. She was admitted to the Order of Canada in 2017 and has won the Governor General's Award for English-language poetry, the Trillium Book Award, the Pat Lowther Award, the Harbourfront Festival Prize, and the Toronto Book Award. Brand lives in Toronto.

== Early life and education ==
Dionne Brand was born in Guayaguayare, Trinidad and Tobago. She graduated from Naparima Girls' High School in San Fernando in 1970 and emigrated to Canada. She attended Erindale College at the University of Toronto and earned a Bachelor of Arts degree in English and philosophy in 1975. She later attained an Master of Arts in Philosophy of Education from the Ontario Institute for Studies in Education in 1989.

== Career ==
Her first book, Fore Day Morning: Poems, came out in 1978, and since then Brand has published numerous works of poetry, fiction, and non-fiction, as well as editing anthologies and working on documentary films with the National Film Board of Canada.

She has held a number of academic positions, including assistant professor of English at the University of Guelph (1992–1994), Ruth Wynn Woodward Professor in Women's Studies at Simon Fraser University (2000–2002), Distinguished Visiting Scholar and Writer-in-Residence at St. Lawrence University (2004–2005), and Ralph Gustafson Distinguished Poet at Vancouver Island University (2006). She is a professor emeritus of English at the School of English and Theatre Studies at the University of Guelph, where she held a University Research Chair.

In 2017, she was appointed as poetry editor of McClelland & Stewart, holding the position until 2021. Brand is a co-editor of the literary journal Brick.

== Writing ==
In her writing, Brand explores themes of gender, race, sexuality, feminism, diaspora, nation, white male domination, injustice, and "the moral hypocrisies of Canada." Despite being often characterized as a Caribbean writer, Brand identifies as a "black Canadian."

She has written about topics including the violent killings of Black people, the École Polytechnique massacre, racism against Indigenous women in Canada, and the sexual exploitation of African women.

Writer Myriam Chancy says Brand found "it possible [...] to engage in personal/critical work which uncovers the connections between us as Black women at the same time as re-discovering that which has been kept from us: our cultural heritage, the language of our grandmothers, ourselves."

=== A Map to the Door of No Return ===
Brand explores inter-generational trauma in her piece A Map to A Door of No Return. She explores her own experiences through an autobiographical perspective as well as diving into explain a concept she calls the "Door of No Return". The Door is the space in which the history of Black people is lost, specifically when enslaved people from Africa were transported through the Atlantic slave trade. Brand defines the Door of No Return as "that place where our ancestors departed one world for another; the Old World for the New." The Door can bring profound grief and pain to many in the diaspora when they encounter it. The Door is a site of traceable beginnings that are eventually lost in historical memory, as demonstrated when Brand's grandfather can no longer remember the name of the ancestral people they belong to. When passing through The Door, people lose their history, their humanity, and their ancestry.

Brand also describes how her interactions with her grandfather became "mutually disappointing" and led to estrangement, as he could not remember the name of the people they came from and thus could not remember their family history. She marks this as being the first time she felt a burning desire to know her ancestry. In this moment, she is confronted with the reality that her life will consist of a never ending battle to complete her identity. Brand notes that her desire only came into full effect when she was denied knowledge of her ancestry. The onset of her inner struggle to find belonging occurred in an entirely Black space, not dependent on the white world. Brand argues that this feeling of being incomplete is common among Black people throughout the diaspora.

Another theme explored in A Map to the Door of No Return is the theory and praxis of geography. She begins to deconstruct and challenge the systems of logic that constitute geography and borders, the way geography has been constructed as truth, the emphasis placed on origins, and the violence of the nation-state.

=== Rivers Have Sources, Trees Have Roots ===
In Rivers Have Sources, Trees Have Roots (1986), Brand and co-author Krisantha Sri Bhaggiyadatta interviewed a hundred people from the Canadian Indigenous, Black, Chinese, and South Asian communities about their perceptions of racism and its impact on their lives. The authors argue that racism prevails in their interviewees' lives both through "the culture of racism" and through institutional structures. They sees racism as a powerful tool to censor oppositional voices and disagree with the conception of racism as isolated or unusual.

=== No Language Is Neutral ===
No Language is Neutral was originally published in 1990 by Coach House Books. In its 50 pages, it tackles issues of immigration, environmentalism, slavery, lesbianism, identity, place, and the female body, all from a Black feminist perspective. It is in conversation with writers of the Black diaspora, namely Derek Walcott. In her opinion, Walcott wrongly plays to the belief that "colonization brought civilization [and] culture." Susan Gingell calls Walcott Brand's "antithetical literary ancestor." The critic Winfried Siemerling described No Language is Neutral as a "breakthrough volume" for its unrestraint. No Language Is Neutral sold over 6,000 copies and was nominated for a Governor General's Award.

=== "St. Mary Estate" ===
In her short story "St. Mary Estate" from Sans Souci and Other Stories, the narrator, accompanied by her sister, revisits the cocoa estate of their childhood, recalling past experiences of racism and shame. She focuses on the summer beach house belonging to "rich whites" that was cleaned by their mother, the daughter of her overseer grandfather. Her anger over discrimination and poverty is triggered by the recollection of living quarters made of thin cardboard with newspapers walls, barracks that metaphorically depict the physical, social, and psychological degradation endured by the enslaved who were denied basic human rights and freedom.

=== "This Body For Itself" ===
In "This Body For Itself" from Bread Out of Stone (1994), Brand discusses the way the Black female body is represented. She asserts that in male-authored texts, the Black female body is often portrayed as motherly or virginal. In female-authored texts, the Black female body is often portrayed as a protector from or resistor to rape. Brand states that the avoidance of portraying Black female bodies as sexual is out of self-preservation, as Black female bodies are often overly sexualized. However, Brand argues that desire and sexuality can be a great source of power.

=== Chronicles of the Hostile Sun ===
Brand wrote many of the poems in her fifth book of poetry, Chronicles of the Hostile Sun, in response to the United States invasion of Grenada. Brand had been living in Grenada and working for a Canadian non-profit organization when the invasion took place. Brand's Chronicles of the Hostile Sun, published one year later in 1984, is divided into three sections: Languages, Sieges, and Military Occupations.

== Filmmaking ==
Brand made a number of documentaries with the National Film Board of Canada's feminist-film production unit, Studio D, from 1989 to 1996. When Studio D was criticized for its lack of diversity, Rina Fraticelli, the executive producer at the time, created a program called New Initiatives in Film (NIF). It was through this program that Brand partnered with producer Ginny Stikeman to create Sisters in the Struggle (1991), a "look at Black women in community, labour and feminist organizing." This was part of the Women at the Well trilogy that also included Older, Stronger, Wiser (1989) and Long Time Comin' (1991). Brand's collaboration with Stikeman also became the model for the internship component of NIF, which offered production experience at various regional studios across Canada and at Studio D in Montreal

Brand did not have an interest in filmmaking until an opportunity arose to consult on a documentary about racism at Studio D. A white filmmaker was the lead on the project and after meeting with her for several days, Brand decided she did not want to be a part of the film. She told the Studio that she would be willing to "do something about Black women from their point of view," which resulted in Long Time Comin'.

Brand directed Listening for Something… Adrienne Rich and Dionne Brand in Conversation (1996). Listening for Something was made as Studio D was being dismantled. Brand also wrote the script for Under One Sky… Arab Women in North America Talk About the Hijab.

Brand's documentary work frequently focuses on multiculturalism and sexual diversity. She warns against state-sponsored images of multiculturalism, stating that true diversity means people having "equal access to equal justice, equal jobs, equal education." Having critiqued the concept of "nation" as often omitting Black women, Brand has focused much of her work on representation for her communities.

== Critical reception ==
Critics of Brand's early work focused on Caribbean national and cultural identity and Caribbean literary theory. Barbadian poet and scholar Kamau Brathwaite referred to Brand as "our first major exile female poet." Academic J. Edward Chamberlain called her "a final witness to the experience of migration and exile" whose "literary inheritance is in some genuine measure West Indian, a legacy of [Derek] Walcott, Brathwaite and others."

Peter Dickinson argues that "Brand 'reterritorializes' [...] boundaries in her writing, (dis)placing or (dis)locating the national narrative of subjectivity [...] into the diaspora of cross-cultural, -racial, -gender, -class, and –erotic identifications." Critic Leslie Sanders argues that "by becoming a Canadian writer, Brand is extending the Canadian identity in a way [Marshall] McLuhan would recognize and applaud" but Dickinson states that "her work remains marginal/marginalizable in academic discussions of Canadian literary canons."

In Redefining the Subject: Sites of Play in Canadian Women's Writing, Charlotte Sturgess suggests that Brand employs a language "through which identity emerges as a mobile, thus discursive, construct." Sturgess argues that Brand's "work uses language strategically, as a wedge to split European traditions, forms and aesthetics apart; to drive them onto their own borders and contradictions."

Academic Franca Bernabei writes in the preamble to Luce ostinata/Tenacious Light (2007), an Italian-English selected anthology of Brand's poetry, that "Brand's poetic production reveals a remarkable variety of formal-stylistic strategies and semantic richness as well as the ongoing pursuit of a voice and a language that embody her political, affective, and aesthetic engagement with the human condition of the black woman—and, more exactly, all those oppressed by the hegemonic program of modernity." Editor and critic Constance Rooke calls Brand "one of the very best [poets] in the world today."

== Activism ==
Openly identifying as a lesbian, Brand is vocal against the anti-LGBTQ discrimination. She is a founder of the newspaper Our Lives, the first Canadian newspaper devoted to Black women. She is also a past chair of the Women's Issues Committee of the Ontario Coalition of Black Trade Unionists, and does work with immigrant organizations in Toronto.

== Awards and honours ==
Brand was made a fellow of the Royal Society of Canada in 2006. In 2009, she was named the Poet Laureate of Toronto. She received honorary degrees from Thorneloe University in 2015 and the University of Windsor in 2017. Also in 2017, she was made a Member of the Order of Canada, with the award invested in 2018.

Year	Nominated work	Award	Category	Result	Ref.
1997	Land to Light On	Governor General's Awards	English-language poetry	Won	
1998	Land to Light On	Trillium Book Award		Won	
2003	thirsty	Pat Lowther Award		Won	
2003	thirsty	Griffin Poetry Prize		Shortlisted	
2006	What We All Long For	Toronto Book Awards		Won	
2006		Harbourfront Festival Prize		Won	
2011	Ossuaries	Griffin Poetry Prize		Won	
2011	Ossuaries	Pat Lowther Award		Won	
2018	The Blue Clerk	Governor General's Awards	English-language poetry	Shortlisted	
2019	The Blue Clerk	Pat Lowther Award		Longlisted	
2019	The Blue Clerk	Griffin Poetry Prize		Shortlisted	
2019		Blue Metropolis Violet Prize		Won	
2021		Windham-Campbell Literature Prize	Fiction	Won	
2025	Salvage: Readings from the Wreck	OCM Bocas Prize for Caribbean Literature	Nonfiction	Won	

== Bibliography ==
=== Poetry ===
- 1978: Fore Day Morning: Poems. Toronto: Khoisan Artists, ISBN 0-920662-02-1
- 1979: Earth Magic. Toronto: Kids Can Press, ISBN 0-919964-25-7
- 1982: Primitive Offensive. Toronto: Williams-Wallace, ISBN 0-88795-012-4
- 1983: Winter Epigrams and Epigrams to Ernesto Cardenal in Defense of Claudia. Toronto: Williams-Wallace, ISBN 0-676-97101-6
- 1984: Chronicles of the Hostile Sun. Toronto: Williams-Wallace, ISBN 0-88795-033-7
- 1990: No Language is Neutral. Toronto: Coach House Press, ISBN 0-88910-395-X
- 1997: Land to Light On. Toronto: McClelland & Stewart, ISBN 0-7710-1645-X
- 2002: thirsty. Toronto: McClelland & Stewart, ISBN 0-7710-1644-1
- 2006: Inventory. Toronto: McClelland & Stewart, ISBN 978-0-7710-1662-2
- 2010: Ossuaries. Toronto: McClelland & Stewart, ISBN 978-0-7710-1736-0
- 2018: The Blue Clerk. Toronto: McClelland & Stewart, ISBN 978-0-7710-7081-5
- 2022: Nomenclature. Durham: Duke University Press, ISBN 978-1-4780-1662-5

=== Fiction ===
- 1988: Sans Souci and Other Stories. Stratford, ON: Williams-Wallace, ISBN 0-88795-072-8 and ISBN 0-88795-073-6
- 1996: In Another Place, Not Here. Toronto: Knopf Canada, ISBN 0-394-28158-6
- 1999: At the Full and Change of the Moon. Toronto: Knopf Canada, ISBN 0-394-28158-6
- 2005: What We All Long For. Toronto: Knopf Canada, ISBN 978-0-676-97693-9
- 2014: Love Enough. Toronto: Knopf Canada, ISBN 978-0-345-80888-2
- 2018: Theory, Toronto: Knopf Canada, ISBN 9780735274235

=== Non-fiction ===
- 1986: Rivers Have Sources, Trees Have Roots: Speaking of Racism (with Krisantha Sri Bhaggiyadatta). Toronto: Cross Cultural Communications Centre, ISBN 0-9691060-6-8
- 1991: No Burden to Carry: Narratives of Black Working Women in Ontario, 1920s–1950s (with Lois De Shield). Toronto: Women's Press, ISBN 0-88961-163-7
- 1994: Imagination, Representation, and Culture
- 1994: We're Rooted Here and They Can't Pull Us Up: Essays in African Canadian Women's History (with Peggy Bristow, Linda Carty, Afua P. Cooper, Sylvia Hamilton, and Adrienne Shadd). University of Toronto Press, ISBN 0-8020-5943-0
- 1994: Bread Out of Stone: Recollections on Sex, Recognitions, Race, Dreaming and Politics. Toronto: Coach House Press, ISBN 0-88910-492-1
- 2001: A Map to the Door of No Return: Notes to Belonging. Toronto: Random House Canada, ISBN 978-0-385-25892-0
- 2008: A Kind of Perfect Speech: The Ralph Gustafson Lecture Malaspina University-College 19 October 2006. Nanaimo, BC: Institute for Coastal Research Publishing, ISBN 978-1-896886-05-3
- 2020: An Autobiography of the Autobiography of Reading. Edmonton: University of Alberta Press, ISBN 978-1-77212-508-5
- 2024: Salvage: Readings from the Wreck. New York: Farrar, Straus and Giroux, ISBN 978-0-374-61484-3

=== Documentaries ===
- 1989: Older, Stronger, Wiser. Dir. Claire Prieto. Assoc. Dir. Dionne Brand (Part I, Women at the Well trilogy). National Film Board of Canada, Studio D
- 1991: Sisters in the Struggle. Dirs. Dionne Brand and Ginny Stikeman (Part II, Women at the Well trilogy). National Film Board of Canada, Studio D
- 1991: Long Time Comin'. Dir. Dionne Brand. Perf. Faith Nolan and Grace Channer (Part III, Women at the Well trilogy). National Film Board of Canada, Studio D
- 1996: Listening for Something: Adrienne Rich and Dionne Brand in Conversation. Dir. Dionne Brand. National Film Board of Canada, Studio D
- 1999: Beyond Borders: Arab Feminists Talk About Their Lives ... East and West. Dir. Jennifer Kawaja. Narr. Dionne Brand. National Film Board of Canada
- 1999: Under One Sky: Arab Women in North America Talk About the Hijab. Dir. Jennifer Kawaja. Narr. Dionne Brand. National Film Board of Canada
- 2006: Borderless: A Docu-Drama About the Lives of Undocumented Workers. Dir. Min Sook Lee. Narr. Dionne Brand. KAIROS Canadian Ecumenical Justice Initiatives

=== Anthologies edited ===
- 2007: The Journey Prize Stories: The Best of Canada's New Stories (Dionne Brand, Caroline Adderson, and David Bezmozqis, eds.). Toronto: McClelland & Stewart, ISBN 978-0-7710-9561-0
- 2017: The Unpublished City (Dionne Brand, ed.). Toronto: BookThug, ISBN 9781771663731

== Archives ==
There is a Dionne Brand fonds at Library and Archives Canada, containing 4.89 meters of textual records, 78 audio cassettes, and two posters.
