= Selina Boan =

Canadian poet

Selina Boan is a Canadian poet from Vancouver, British Columbia, whose poetry collection Undoing Hours was the winner of the Pat Lowther Award in 2022.

Of mixed European and Cree descent, Boan's poetry mixes both the English and Cree languages. The book was also shortlisted for the Gerald Lampert Award.
