= Jennifer Zilm =

Canadian poet

Jennifer Zilm is a Canadian poet. Her first book, Waiting Room (2016), was a finalist for the Robert Kroetsch Award for Innovative Poetry,.It has been described as making a "valuable contribution to the documentary tradition in Canadian poetry." Her second book, The Missing Field (2018), was a finalist for the Pat Lowther Award. The Malahat Review praised its poems "centred on the intellectual landscapes of documents and ephemera" for being "endlessly intricate and beautiful".

Zilm is a former member of the Room Magazine editorial collective. She is a librarian and archivist and her work draws heavily on techniques such as collage and erasure.

== Bibliography ==
- Waiting Room (2016) BookThug
- The Missing Field (2018) Guernica Editions
