= Bronwen Wallace =

Canadian poet and short story writer (1945 – 1989)

- Born: May 26, 1945; Kingston, Ontario
- Died: August 25, 1989 (aged 44); Kingston, Ontario, Canada
- Education: Queen's University
- Occupations: poet, writer, teacher

Bronwen Wallace (26 May 1945 – 25 August 1989) was a Canadian poet and short story writer.

== Life and career ==
Wallace was born in Kingston, Ontario. She attended Queen's University, Kingston (B.A. 1967, M.A. 1969). In 1970, she moved to Windsor, Ontario, where she founded a women's bookstore and became active in working class and women's activist groups. In 1977, she returned to Kingston, where she worked at a women's shelter and taught at St. Lawrence College and Queen's. She wrote a weekly column for the Kingston Whig-Standard. In 1988, she was writer-in-residence at the University of Western Ontario.

Her collections testify to her social activism involving women's rights, civil rights, and social policy. A primary focus of her work was violence against women and children.

In a series of letters published in 1994 as Two Women Talking: Correspondence 1985-1987, Wallace and poet Erín Moure discuss feminist theory. Moure defends the language philosophers (particularly Wittgenstein) who demonstrate that our speech, and the concepts expressible in language, govern our knowledge and actions. However, Wallace disagreed that language-centred writing rescues women from the patriarchy, claiming that it can be easily co-opted by patriarchs. Society's use of politically correct language, she notes in the book, bears this out. Wallace believed that by engaging her readers in the issues of violence, she could provoke change in the reader and hence in society.

Wallace died of cancer in 1989. Her first and only published collection of short stories, People You'd Trust Your Life To, was published posthumously by McClelland & Stewart in 1990.

The RBC Bronwen Wallace Award for Emerging Writers, founded by friends of the poet and the Writers' Trust of Canada, was originally an annual prize given to a young and promising poet or fiction writer who is under the age of 35 and unpublished in book form. In 2021, in response to feedback from the publishing industry and a drafted open letter by MFA candidate and editor Jade Wallace, the RBC Bronwen Wallace Award for Emerging Writers opened eligibility to poetry and short-fiction submissions from writers of all ages unpublished in book form.

== Awards and honours ==
In 1984, Wallace won the Pat Lowther Memorial Award for her poetry collection, Signs of the Former Tenant.

== Bibliography ==
=== Poetry ===
- Marrying into the Family − 1980
- Signs of the Former Tenant − 1983
- Common Magic − 1985
- The Stubborn Particulars of Grace − 1987
- Keep That Candle Burning Bright and Other Poems − 1991
- Collected Poems of Bronwen Wallace − 2020

=== Short stories ===
- People You'd Trust Your Life To – 1990

=== Essays ===
- Arguments with the World – 1992, includes the essay "Humans and Other Animals"

=== Letters ===
- Two Women Talking: Correspondence 1985–1987 – 1994 (with Erín Moure)
