= Gay Allison =

Canadian poet, editor, and English teacher

- Born: 1953 (age 72–73); Saskatchewan, Canada
- Occupations: Poet, Editor, English Teacher

Gay Allison (born 1953) is a Canadian poet, editor, and English teacher. She was the fiction editor of The Canadian Forum, poetry editor of Waves, founding editor of a feminist journal, Fireweed, co-editor of Landscape, and founding member of the Women's Writing Collective of Toronto. Additionally, Allison is an advisory board member of Tiger Lily, a journal by women of colour. Allison is also a full member of the League of Canadian Poets.

She was the recipient of the Poetry Award from the Federation of Women Teachers' Association of Ontario (FWTAO) in 1982 and 1986.

== Early life ==
Allison was born in Saskatchewan. She has since lived in Saskatoon, Edmonton, Vancouver, and Toronto.

== Work ==
Allison's poetry in The Unravelling, focuses on daily life "at a slow meditative pace."

== Publications ==
=== Poetry ===
- Life: Still. (1981)
- In the Valley of the Butterflies (1981)
- The Unravelling (1986)
- "Iron Shirt Moves" (1988)

=== Anthologies ===
- Women and Words: The Anthology/Les femmes et les mots: Une anthologie (1984)
- Sp/Elles: Poetry by Canadian Women/Poésie de femmes canadiennes (1986)

== Awards ==
- Federation of Women Teachers' Association of Ontario, Poetry Award, 1982, 1986.
- Tyrone Guthrie Award, Stratford Festival, 1997.
