= Elisabeth Harvor =

Canadian novelist and poet (1936–2024)

Erica Elisabeth Arendt Deichmann (26 June 1936 – 8 October 2024), known as Elisabeth Harvor, was a Canadian short story writer, poet, and novelist.

== Biography ==
Harvor was born to Danish immigrant artisans in Saint John, New Brunswick and grew up on the Kingston Peninsula. She enrolled at Concordia University in 1983, receiving an MA in Creative Writing in 1986. Her thesis, "Hospitals & Night", was published under the title If Only We Could Drive like This Forever in 1988.

Harvor's fiction and poetry was a finalist for and winner of several awards. Her third short story collection, Let Me Be the One, was a finalist for the 1996 Governor General's Literary Award for English-language fiction. Fortress of Chairs, her first collection of poems, won the League of Canadian Poets 1992 Gerald Lampert Memorial Award for best first book of poetry written by a Canadian. Her second poetry book, The Long Cold Green Evenings of Spring, was a finalist for the 1997 Pat Lowther Award, and her first novel, Excessive Joy Injures the Heart, was chosen as one of the ten best books of the year by The Toronto Star in 2000. Harvor also won the 2000 Alden Nowlan Award, the 2003 Marian Engel Award, and in 2004, the Malahat Novella Prize for "Across Some Dark Avenue of Plot He Carried Her Body." In 2015, Harvor won second prize in Prairie Fire magazine's Fiction category for "An Animal Trainer Urging A Big Cat Out of its Cage".

Harvor died on 8 October 2024, at the age of 88.

== Bibliography ==
=== Short stories ===
- Women and Children (Oberon Press, Ottawa, ON, 1973)
- If Only We Could Drive Like This Forever (Penguin Books Canada Limited, Markham, ON, 1988) ISBN 0-14-010383-X
- Our Lady of All The Distances (HarperCollins, Toronto, ON, 1991; reissue with minor revisions of Women and Children)
- Let Me Be the One (HarperCollins Publishers Limited, Toronto, ON 1996. Finalist for the Governor General's Award for fiction) ISBN 0-00-224554-X
- Hierarchy (Frog Hollow Press, Victoria, BC; New Brunswick Chapbook Series, Volume 12, 2019) ISBN 9781926948898

=== Poetry ===
- Fortress of Chairs (Signal Editions, Véhicule Press, Montreal, QC, 1992) Winner of the League of Canadian Poets Gerald Lampert Memorial Award)
- The Long Cold Green Evenings of Spring (Signal Editions, Véhicule Press, Montreal, QC, 1997) ISBN 1-55065-091-2
- An Open Door in the Landscape (Palimpsest Press, Windsor, ON, 2010) ISBN 978-1-926794-01-3

=== Novels ===
- Excessive Joy Injures the Heart (McClelland & Stewart, Toronto, ON; Harcourt in the US, 2000) ISBN 0-15-100894-9
- All Times Have Been Modern (Viking Canada/Penguin Group, Toronto, ON, 2004) ISBN 0-670-04440-7

=== Anthologies ===
- A Room at the Heart of Things (as editor) (Véhicule Press, Montreal, QC, 1998) ISBN 9781550650945
