= Galicia Hoxe =

- Type: Daily newspaper
- Format: Broadsheet
- Owner(s): Feliciano Barrera
- Publisher: Grupo Correo Gallego
- Editor: Feliciano Barrera
- Founded: 1994
- Headquarters: Santiago de Compostela, Galicia Spain
- Website: www.galiciahoxe.com

Galicia Hoxe is a Galician digital newspaper from Santiago de Compostela written entirely in Galician. Founded in January 1994, it was formerly called O Correo Galego. It changed its name to Galicia Hoxe in May 2003, and ceased publication on 28 June 2011, due to financial reasons, but remains an active internet news source.
