= Rachel Rose =

Canadian/American poet, essayist and short story writer

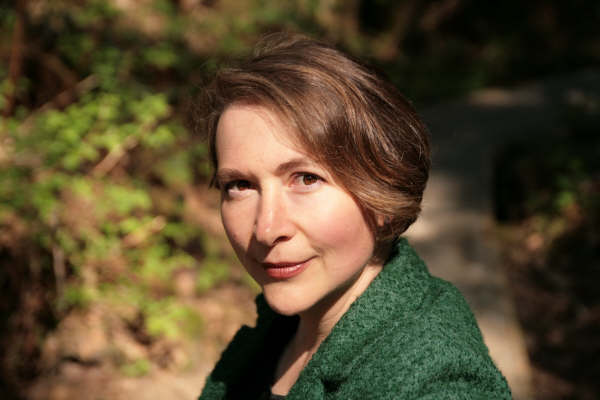
- Born: September 20, 1970 (age 55); Vancouver, British Columbia, Canada
- Occupations: Poet, essayist and short story writer
- Writing career
- Genres: Poetry, essay, fiction
- Notable works: Notes on Arrival and Departure
- Website: www.rachelrose.ca

Rachel Rose (born September 20, 1970) is a Canadian/American poet, essayist and short story writer. She has published three collections of poetry, Giving My Body to Science, Notes on Arrival and Departure, and Song and Spectacle. Her poems, essays and short stories have been published in literary magazines and anthologies in Canada and the United States.

In 2011, Rose and composer Leslie Uyeda were commissioned by the Queer Arts Festival in Vancouver to write the libretto for Canada's first lesbian opera, When The Sun Comes Out, which premiered in August 2013 in Vancouver and in Toronto in June 2014.

Rose was Vancouver's Poet Laureate from 2014 to 2017.

Rose's short story collection The Octopus has Three Hearts was nominated for the 2021 Giller Prize.

== Personal life ==
Rose grew up on Hornby Island (British Columbia), Vancouver, Anacortes and Seattle. In the mid-1990s, she lived and worked in Japan for a year. She has worked as a medical secretary, ESL teacher, and as the poetry mentor in the Writer's Studio at Simon Fraser University. In 2015, she was a resident in the International Writing Program at the University of Iowa.

== Bibliography ==
=== Poetry ===
- Giving My Body to Science (1999), McGill-Queen's University Press
- Notes on Arrival and Departure (2005), McClelland & Stewart
- Song and Spectacle (2012), Harbour Publishing
- Marry & Burn (2015), Harbour Publishing

=== Essays ===
- "Creating Benjamin", Prairie Fire, Volume 22, No. 4 (Winter 2001)
- "Letters to a Young Mother Who Writes" (in Double Lives: Writing and Motherhood, edited by Shannon Cowan, Fiona Tinwei Lam and Cathy Stonehouse, 2008, McGill/Queens University Press)
- "A Tale of Two Mommies" (in Between Interruptions: 30 Women Tell the Truth about Motherhood, edited by Cori Howard, 2009, Key Porter Books)

=== Short stories ===
- "Sundays" (in Hot & Bothered, edited by Aren X. Tulchinsky, 1998, Arsenal Pulp Press)
- "Want", This Magazine, May/June 1999
- "The Glass Eye", The Alaska Quarterly Review, Vol 24, No. 3&4 (Fall and Winter 2007)

=== Anthologies ===
- Uncharted Lines: Poems from the Journal of the American Medical Association (1998), Ten Speed Press
- In Fine Form: The Canadian Book of Form Poetry (2005), Polestar
- White Ink: Poems on Mothers and Motherhood (2007), York University
- Letters to the World: Poems from the Wom-po Listserv (2008), Red Hen Press
- Open Wide A Wilderness: Canadian Nature Poems (2009), Wilfrid Laurier University Press

=== Operas ===
- When The Sun Comes Out (2013)

=== Books ===
- The Dog Lover Unit: Lessons in Courage from the World's K-9 Cops (2017), St Martin's Press
- The Octopus has Three Hearts (2021), Douglas & McIntyre

== Awards and prizes ==
Awards for Rose's writing
Year	Title	Award	Result	Ref.
1997		Bronwen Wallace Award for Short Fiction	Winner	
2000	Giving My Body to Science	Pat Lowther Memorial Award	Finalist	
2000	Giving My Body to Science	Gerald Lampert Award	Finalist	
2000		Grand Prix du Livre de Montreal	Finalist	
2000	Giving My Body to Science	Quebec Writers Federation A.M. Klein Award	Winner	
2013	Song and Spectacle	Audre Lorde Award for Lesbian Poetry	Winner	
2013	Song and Spectacle	Pat Lowther Memorial Award	Winner	
2016	Marry & Burn	Pat Lowther Memorial Award	Finalist	
2016	Marry & Burn	Governor General's Award for English-Language Poetry	Finalist	
2021	The Octopus Has Three Hearts	Giller Prize	Longlist	
