= Sandy Shreve =

Canadian poet, editor and visual artist

Sandy Shreve was a Canadian poet, editor and visual artist living on Pender Island, British Columbia.

== Biography ==
Raised in New Brunswick, Shreve moved to Pender Island after spending some 40 years in Vancouver, British Columbia. Since that move, she has focused on visual arts, and exhibited her photos and paintings in a variety of exhibits on Pender and on Vancouver Island.

Shreve has written, edited and/or co-edited eight books and two chapbooks. Her latest poetry collection is Waiting for the Albatross. Recent work has appeared in her chapbooks, Cedar Cottage Suite and Level Crossing. Her work is widely anthologized and has won or been shortlisted for several awards, including the Earle Birney Prize (for "Elles", published in Prism Magazine, 2000) and the Milton Acorn Peoples Poetry Award (for Belonging, Sono Nis Press, 1997). She co-edited, with Kate Braid, the anthology In Fine Form – The Canadian Book of Form Poetry (2005) and In Fine Form, 2nd edition - A Contemporary Look and Canadian Form Poetry(2016); edited Working For A Living, a collection of poems and stories by women about their work (Room of One’s Own, 1988) and founded BC’s "Poetry in Transit" program, which has been displaying BC poetry in SkyTrain cars and buses across the province since 1996.

Shreve died on Sunday, February 8, 2026.

== Bibliography ==
- Working For a Living, published as a special double issue of Room of One's Own (vol. 12 #s 2 & 3, 1988, 208 pp) (as editor)
- The Speed of The Wheel Is Up to the Potter (Quarry Press, 1990)
- Bewildered Rituals (Polestar Book Publishers, 1992)
- Belonging (Sono Nis Press, 1997)
- In Fine Form – The Canadian Book of Form Poetry (Polestar Book Publishers, 2005; now available from Caitlin Press) (co-edited with Kate Braid)
- Suddenly, So Much, (Exile Editions, 2005)
- Cedar Cottage Suite, (Leaf Press, 2010)
- Level Crossing, (Alfred Gustav Press, Fall 2012)
- Waiting for the Albatross, (Oolichan Books, 2015)
- In Fine Form, 2nd edition - A Contemporary Look at Canadian Form Poetry (Caitlin Preess, 2016) (co-edited with Kate Braid)
