= Ossuaries (poetry collection) =

2010 poetry collection by Dionne Brand

- cover of paperback
- Author: Dionne Brand
- Language: English
- Publisher: McClelland & Stewart
- Publication date: 2010

Ossuaries is a 2010 poetry collection by Canadian writer Dionne Brand, published by McClelland & Stewart while she was serving as Toronto's poet laureate. It won the 2011 Griffin Poetry Prize award for a work by a Canadian poet. This was Brand's second book to be shortlisted for this prize, after 2003's thirsty.

Ossuaries is a single book length poem made up of tercets which is divided into 15 parts, which relays the story of Yasmine, an American activist who has been living underground since her participation in a bank heist in the 70s.

== Reception ==
Writing for the Toronto Star, Barb Carey calls the book a "dark, searing vision of our world," with the book acting as an inventory of the "hard things"—or as the title suggests, a collection of bones—from Yasmine's life. For The Globe and Mail's review, Sonnet L'Abbé writes that "the desolation of Ossuaries is almost unrelenting," startled with "bursts of hopefulness," unfurling in a long stream, "never coming to a full stop."

Anne Quéma argues for Ossuaries's inclusion in a poetic genealogy reflecting on necropolitics, "poised between carnage and commemoration", by presenting a "necrobiography" of Yasmine.

The judges for the Griffin Prize commended the work for "not [sacrificing] the tight lyrical coil of the poetic line" while still meeting novelistic ambitions.
