= Jan Zwicky =

Canadian philosopher (born 1955)

Jan Zwicky CM
- Born: 10 May 1955 (age 70); Calgary, Alberta, Canada
- Occupations: Poet; philosopher; musician
- Spouse: Robert Bringhurst

Janine Louise Zwicky CM (born 10 May 1955) is a Canadian philosopher, poet, essayist, and musician. She was appointed to the Order of Canada in June 2022.

== Life and career ==
Zwicky received her BA from the University of Calgary and earned her PhD at the University of Toronto in 1981 where her studies focussed on the philosophy of logic and science. She subsequently taught philosophy at Princeton University; philosophy and interdisciplinary humanities at the University of Waterloo; philosophy at the University of Western Ontario; philosophy, English, and creative writing at the University of New Brunswick; and philosophy at the University of Alberta.

Zwicky is Professor Emerita in the Department of Philosophy at the University of Victoria, where she taught both philosophy and interdisciplinary humanities courses from 1996 until 2009. She has served as a faculty member at the Banff Centre Writing Studio, has conducted numerous writing workshops, and served as an editor for Brick Books from 1985 to 2018. From 2017 through 2019, she was the series editor of Oskana Poetry and Poetics, an imprint of the University of Regina Press.

== Philosophy ==
Zwicky's philosophical work challenges the hegemonic status of logico-linguistic analysis in 20th and 21st century Anglo-American philosophy. She is a realist who aims to defeat analytic skepticism by exploring the relationship between philosophical and poetic thinking, and by developing the notions of resonance and lyric understanding in ontology and epistemology:

"Lyric shares with the coherentists, pragmatists, and nihilists the view that foundationalism is intellectually bankrupt: that what analytic system cannot sustain is anything like the claim of naive realism. However, lyric shares with naive realism the view that skepticism is false. What it does not share is the view that it is demonstrably, within system, false." (Lyric Philosophy L264)

Her books, Lyric Philosophy and Wisdom & Metaphor, discuss but also enact this idea of resonance. They consist of many voices that range across diverse disciplines, so that Zwicky's aphoristic remarks on the left-hand pages are read with and against excerpts from the history of philosophy, musical scores, paintings, photographs, and poems on the right-hand pages. While Zwicky orders her remarks carefully and has a linear philosophical argument to make, each page is also designed to evoke remarks or images from other pages, prompting non-linear connections and directly demonstrating what she refers to as lyric structure, characterized by resonance.

Zwicky believes that Heraclitus, Plato, and Wittgenstein have purposefully constructed philosophical texts in this way before her. She cites Freud's distinction between primary and secondary processes, as well as Max Wertheimer's work in gestalt psychology, as support for the concepts she promotes. She references pieces of music, works of art, and natural eco-systems as objects that also exhibit lyric structure.

Zwicky presents logical analysis and lyric thinking as complementary and includes both in a broader, more total conception of reason. She believes that the Anglo-American notion of what constitutes good philosophy is excessively narrow, and criticizes Continental and poststructural views for their anti-realist vision of the world as nothing more than a projection of human thought and desire. Zwicky promotes balance, arguing that neglect of either logical or lyric thinking leads to our ontological, epistemological, ethical and environmental peril.

James O. Young, Professor of Philosophy at the University of Victoria has said: "There's a reasonable chance that people will be reading her work a century from now. This is something that one says about only a very small number of philosophers."

== Poetry ==
Zwicky's poetry is influenced by music in the classical European, blues, and jazz traditions. It also deals with the natural world, and has often been cited for its intense lyricism. Thirty-seven Small Songs and Thirteen Silences has appeared in Swedish (translated by Roy Isaakson; Palaver Press). Numerous individual poems have been translated into Czech, French, German, Serbian, Spanish and Italian.

Among her many accolades, both Zwicky's Songs for Relinquishing the Earth and Robinson's Crossing were shortlisted for Governor General's Awards for Poetry. Songs for Relinquishing the Earth won the award in 1999. Robinson's Crossing won the Dorothy Livesay Poetry Prize in 2004.

Her 2011 book, Forge, was shortlisted for the 2012 Canadian Griffin Poetry Prize.

== Bibliography ==
=== Books ===
- Wittgenstein Elegies – 1986, 2015 (2nd Ed.)
- The New Room – 1989 (shortlisted for the Pat Lowther Award)
- Lyric Philosophy – 1992, 2011 (2nd ed.), 2014 (3rd ed.)
- Songs for Relinquishing the Earth – 1996, 1998 (winner of the 1999 Governor General's Award for Poetry and shortlisted for the Pat Lowther Award)
- Twenty-One Small Songs – 2000
- Wisdom & Metaphor – 2003, 2008 (2nd ed.) (shortlisted for the 2004 Governor General's Award for Nonfiction)
- Robinson's Crossing – 2004 (winner of the Dorothy Livesay Poetry Prize; shortlisted for the 2004 Governor General's Award for Poetry and the Pat Lowther Award)
- Thirty-seven Small Songs & Thirteen Silences – 2005 (shortlisted for the Dorothy Livesay Poetry Prize and the Pat Lowther Award)
- Plato as Artist – 2009
- Forge – 2011 (shortlisted for the 2012 Griffin Poetry Prize and the Pat Lowther Award)
- Auden as Philosopher: How Poets Think - 2011
- The Book of Frog – 2012
- Vittoria Colonna - Selections from the Rime Spirituali with photographs by Robert Moody - 2014
- Alkibiades' Love: Essays in Philosophy – 2015
- Chamber Music: The Poetry of Jan Zwicky, ed. Darren Bifford and Warren Heiti - 2015
- The Long Walk – 2016 (Oskana Poetry & Poetics Series, University of Regina Press)
- Learning to Die: Wisdom in the Age of Climate Crisis - 2018 (co-authored with Robert Bringhurst) (University of Regina Press)
- The Experience of Meaning - 2019
- Fifty-six Ontological Studies with photographs by Robert Moody – 2020
- Sixty-Seven Ontological Studies with photographs by Robert Moody – 2022
- Once Upon a Time in the West – 2023

=== Essays ===
- "Wittgenstein and the Logic of Inference", Dialogue, Vol. XXI, No. 4, December 1982
- "Bringhurst's Presocratics: Lyric and Ecology" in Poetry and Knowing: Speculative Essays and Interviews (edited by Tim Lilburn) – 1995
- "Plato's Phaedrus: Philosophy as Dialogue With the Dead", Apeiron, Vol. 30, No. 1, March 1997
- "Being, Polyphony, Lyric: An Open Letter to Robert Bringhurst", Canadian Literature, No. 156, Spring 1998
- "The Geology of Norway", Harvard Review of Philosophy, Vol. 7, Spring 1999
- "Dream Logic and the Politics of Interpretation" & "Once Upon a Time in the West: Heidegger and the Poets" in Thinking and Singing: Poetry & The Practice of Philosophy (edited by Tim Lilburn) – 2002
- "Wilderness and Agriculture" in The Eye in the Thicket: Essays at a Natural History (edited by Sean Virgo) – 2002
- "Integrity and Ornament" in Crime and Ornament, edited by Bernie Miller and Melony Ward 2002
- "Oracularity", Metaphilosophy, Vol. 34, No. 4, July 2003
- "The Ethics of the Negative Review", Malahat Review, No. 144, Fall 2003
- Introduction to Hard Choices: Climate Change in Canada, edited by Harold Coward and A.J. Weaver 2004
- "Mathematical Analogy and Metaphorical Insight", The Mathematical Intelligencer, Vol. 28, No. 2, 2006
- '"Lyric, Narrative, Memory" in A Ragged Pen: Essays on Poetry & Memory – 2006
- "Lyric Realism: Nature Poetry, Silence and Ontology", Malahat Review, No. 165, Winter 2008
- "What Is Ineffable?", International Studies in the Philosophy of Science, Vol. 26, No. 2, June 2012, pp 197–217
- "Alcibiades' Love" in Philosophy as a Way of Life: Ancients and Moderns (edited by Michael Chase, Stephen R. L. Clark, and Michael McGhee) – 2013
- "A Note on Jane Jacobs's Systems of Survival, or Why We Will Not Be Able to Prevent Global Ecological Collapse" in Brick: A Literary Journal, Vol. 105, Summer 2020, pp 48–53
- "Frost and Snow", Eidos: A Journal for Philosophy of Culture, Vol. 5, 2021, pp 146–154 and Brick: A Literary Journal, Vol. 107, Summer 2021, pp 45–53

=== Interviews ===
- "There is No Place That Does Not See You" – 2002 Interviewed by Anne Simpson in Where the Words Come From: Canadian Poets in Conversation (edited by Tim Bowling)
- "The Details: An Interview with Jan Zwicky" – 2008 Interviewed by Jay Ruzesky in the Malahat Review, No. 165, Winter 2008
- "Perfect Fluency" – 2011 Interviewed by Scott Pinkmountain in the Owen Wister Review
- "The Griffin Poetry Prize Questionnaire: Jan Zwicky" – 4 June 2012, The National Post, Mark Medley

=== Conversations ===
- "Contemplation and Resistance: A conversation [with Tim Lilburn]" excerpt reprinted in Lyric Ecology (edited by Mark Dickinson and Clare Goulet, 2010)
- "Embodiment and Voice: A Conversation", with Darren Bifford and Warren Heiti, Brick 94 (Winter 2015), 15–23.

=== Commentary ===
- Lyric Ecology: An Appreciation of the Work of Jan Zwicky, ed. Mark Dickinson and Clare Goulet – 2010
