= Rhea Tregebov =

Canadian poet, novelist and children's writer

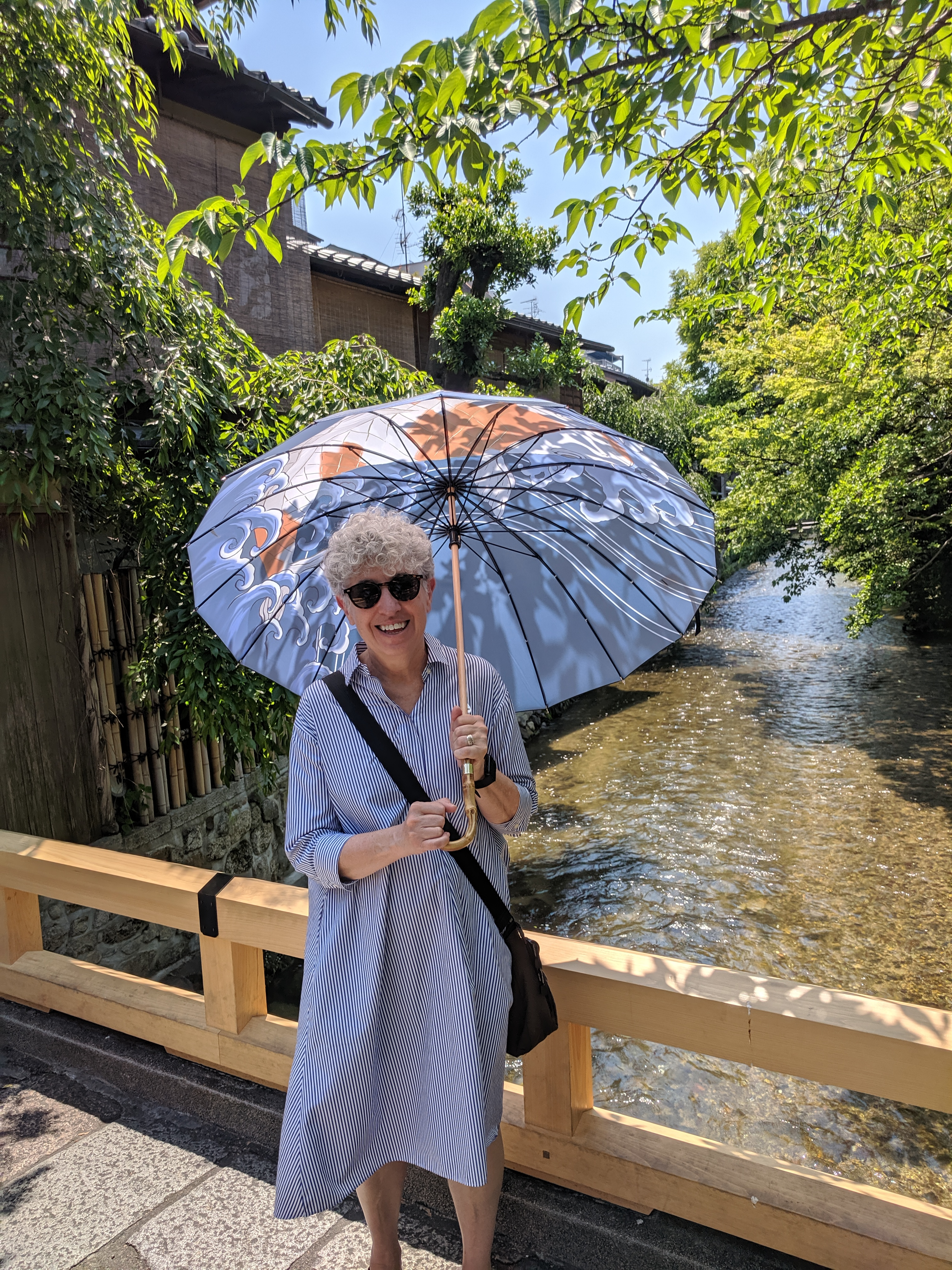
- Tregebov in May 2019
- Born: 1953 (age 72–73) Saskatoon, Saskatchewan, Canada
- Occupation: Author
- Genre: Poetry; fiction; children's literature

Rhea Tregebov (born 1953) is a Canadian poet, novelist, and children's writer who lives in Vancouver, British Columbia. She has taught creative writing at the University of British Columbia and elsewhere, and worked extensively as a freelance editor. Her poetry is characterized by engagement with the extraordinary lived experience of ordinary life. An early influence on her was Pablo Neruda. Tregebov has authored eight collections of poetry, most recently Talking to Strangers. She has also published two novels, Rue des Rosiers and The Knife-Sharpener’s Bell, as well as five children's picture books. From 2021 to 2023 she was chair of the Writers' Union of Canada.

== Life and career ==
Born in Saskatoon, Saskatchewan, and raised in Winnipeg, Manitoba, Tregebov attended the University of Manitoba, Cornell University, and Boston University.

Her 1982 book of poetry Remembering History won the Pat Lowther Award in 1983.

She lived in Toronto, working as a freelance writer, editor, and creative writing instructor. She taught creative writing at Ryerson University and was on faculty at the Banff Centre for Arts and Creativity. In January 2005, she was hired by the Creative Writing Program at the University of British Columbia, where she was promoted to associate professor in 2012. At UBC she specialized in poetry, writing for children, and translation. In 2017, she retired from UBC; she is an associate professor emerita.

== Bibliography ==
=== Poetry ===
- Remembering History – 1982, ISBN 0-919349-16-1
- No One We Know – 1986, ISBN 0-920544-44-4
- The Proving Grounds – 1991, ISBN 1-55065-018-1
- Mapping the Chaos – 1995, ISBN 1-55065-070-X
- The Strength of Materials – 2001, ISBN 0-919897-76-2
- (alive): New and selected poems – 2004, ISBN 0-919897-98-3
- All Souls' – 2012, ISBN 9781550653380
- Talking to Strangers – 2024, ISBN 9781550656565

=== Children's books ===
- The Extraordinary Ordinary Everything Room – 1991, ISBN 0-929005-24-4
- The Big Storm – 1992, ISBN 1-55074-081-4
- Sasha and the Wiggly Tooth – 1993, ISBN 0-929005-51-1
- Sasha and the Wind – 1996, ISBN 0-929005-84-8
- What-If Sara – 1999, ISBN 1-896764-22-3

=== Novels ===
- The Knife Sharpener's Bell – 2009, ISBN 978-1-55050-408-8
- Rue des Rosiers – 2019, ISBN 978-1-55050-699-0
