= Kate Braid =

Canadian poet (born 1947)

- Born: March 19, 1947 (age 79); Calgary, Alberta, Canada
- Occupations: poet, writer

Kathleen (Kate) Braid (born March 19, 1947) is a Canadian poet. Born in Calgary, Alberta, she was raised in Montreal, Quebec, and graduated from Mount Allison University. Her poems and personal essays have been widely printed and anthologized. She lives in Vancouver, British Columbia.

== Bibliography ==
Poetry

- Covering Rough Ground (Polestar, 1991)
- To This Cedar Fountain (Polestar, 1995)
- Inward to the Bones: Georgia O'Keeffe's Journey with Emily Carr (Polestar, 1998)
- In Fine Form: The Canadian Book of Form Poetry (Polestar, 2005; Ed., with Sandy Shreve)
- A Well-Mannered Storm: The Glenn Gould Poems (Caitlin, 2008)
- Turning Left to the Ladies (Palimpsest, 2009)

Poetry Chapbooks

- Small Songs (Hawthorne Society, 1994)
- A Woman's Fingerprint ({m}Other Tongue Press, 1997)

Non-fiction

- Red Bait! Struggle of a Mine Mill Local with Al King (Kingbird, 1998)
- Emily Carr: Rebel Artist (2000)
- The Fish Come In Dancing: Stories from the West-Coast Fishery (Ed., Strawberry Hill, 2002)
