= Governor General's Award for French-language poetry =

Canadian literary award

This is a list of recipients of the Governor General's Award for French-language poetry. The award was created in 1981 when the Governor General's Award for French language poetry or drama was divided.

== Winners and nominees ==
=== 1980s ===
Year	Author	Title
1981	Michel Beaulieu	Visages
1981	No advance shortlist was released.	
1982	Michel Savard	Forages
1982	Alphonse Piché	Dernier profil
1983	Suzanne Paradis	Un goût de sel
1983	Claude Beausoleil	Une certaine fin de siècle: Poésie 1973-1983
1983	Hugues Corriveau	Revoir le rouge
1983	Denis Vanier	Rejet de prince
1984	Nicole Brossard	Double Impression
1984	Michel Beaulieu	Kaléidoscope
1984	André Roy	Les sept jours de la jouissance
1984	Élise Turcotte	Navires de guerre
1985	André Roy	Action writing
1985	Anne-Marie Alonzo	Bleus de mine
1985	François Charron	La vie n'a pas de sens
1985	Patrice Desbiens	Dans l'après-midi cardiaque
1985	Paul Chanel Malenfant	Les noms du père, suivi de Lieux dits: Italique
1986	Cécile Cloutier	L'écouté
1986	François Charron	La chambre des miracles
1986	Normand de Bellefeuille	Catégoriques, un deux et trois
1986	Louise Dupré	Chambres
1987	Fernand Ouellette	Les Heures
1987	Hugues Corriveau	Mobiles
1987	Normand de Bellefeuille,	Heureusement, ici il y à la guerre
1987	Gérald Godin	Ils ne demandaient qu'à brûler
1988	Marcel Labine	Papiers d'épidémie
1988	François Charron	Le Monde comme obstacle
1988	Louise Dupré	Bonheur
1988	Gilbert Langevin	La Saison hantée
1989	Pierre DesRuisseaux	Monème
1989	Christiane Frenette	Cérémonie mémoire
1989	Élise Turcotte	La Terre est ici

=== 1990s ===
Year	Author	Title
1990	Jean-Paul Daoust	Les Cendres bleues
1990	Geneviève Amyot	Corps d'atelier
1990	André Brochu	Dans les chances de l'air
1990	Denise Desautels	Leçons de Venise
1990	Joël Des Rosiers	Tribu
1991	Madeleine Gagnon	Chant pour un Québec lointain
1991	Claude Beausoleil	Une certaine fin de siècle
1991	François Charron	L'Intraduisible amour
1991	Herménégilde Chiasson	Vous
1991	Rachel Leclerc	Les vies frontalières
1992	Gilles Cyr	Andromède attendra
1992	Paul Bélanger	Retours suivi de Minuit, l'aube
1992	Yves Boisvert	La balance du vent
1992	Pierre Ouellet	Fonds suivi de Faix
1992	Jean-Noël Pontbriand	Lieux – Passages
1993	Denise Desautels	Le Saut de l'ange
1993	Denise Boucher	Grandeur nature
1993	Roger Des Roches	La Réalité
1993	Madeleine Gagnon	La Terre est remplie de langage
1993	Serge Patrice Thibodeau	Le Cycle de Prague
1994	Fulvio Caccia	Aknos
1994	Marcel Labine	Machines imaginaires
1994	Rachel Leclerc	Rabatteurs d'étoiles
1994	Paul Chanel Malenfant	Hommes de profil
1994	Pierre Ouellet	Vita chiara, villa oscura
1995	Émile Martel	Pour orchestre et poète seul
1995	Louise Desjardins	La 2e Avenue précédé de Petite sensation, La minutie de l'araignée, Le marché de l'amour
1995	Jocelyne Felx	La Pierre et les heures
1995	Gérald Gaudet	La Fiction de l'âme
1995	Andrée Lacelle	Tant de vie s'égare
1996	Serge Patrice Thibodeau	Le Quatuor de l'errance / La Traversée du désert
1996	José Acquelin	L'Oiseau respirable
1996	Jean Charlebois	De moins en moins l'amour de plus en plus
1996	Herménégilde Chiasson	Climats
1996	Louise Cotnoir	Dis-moi que j'imagine
1997	Pierre Nepveu	Romans-fleuves
1997	Nicole Brossard	Vertige de l'avant-scène
1997	Serge Legagneur	Poèmes choisis, 1961–1997
1997	Paul Chanel Malenfant	Fleuves
1997	Hélène Monette	Plaisirs et Paysages kitsch
1998	Suzanne Jacob	La Part de feu / Le Deuil de la rancune
1998	Hugues Corriveau	Le Livre du frère
1998	Hélène Dorion	Les Murs de la grotte
1998	Christine Richard	L'Eau des oiseaux
1998	Michel van Schendel	Bitumes
1999	Herménégilde Chiasson	Conversations
1999	Claude Beausoleil	Le Chant du voyageur
1999	Nicole Brossard	Musée de l'os et de l'eau
1999	Carole David	La Maison d'Ophélie
1999	Pierre Ouellet	Dieu sait quoi

=== 2000s ===
Year	Author	Title
2000	Normand de Bellefeuille	La Marche de l'aveugle sans son chien
2000	Martine Audet	Orbites
2000	Joël Des Rosiers	Vétiver
2000	Madeleine Gagnon	Rêve de pierre
2000	Claude Paré	Exécuté en chambre
2001	Paul Chanel Malenfant	Des ombres portées
2001	Tania Langlais	Douze bêtes aux chemises de l'homme
2001	Hélène Monette	Un jardin dans la nuit
2001	Stefan Psenak	La beauté
2001	Jean-Philippe Raîche	Une lettre au bout du monde
2002	Robert Dickson	Humains paysages en temps de paix relative
2002	Anne-Marie Alonzo	...et la nuit
2002	René Lapierre	Piano
2002	Paul-Marie Lapointe	Espèces fragiles
2002	Louise Warren	La lumière, l'arbre, le trait
2003	Pierre Nepveu	Lignes aériennes
2003	Nicole Brossard	Cahier de roses & de civilisation
2003	Carle Coppens	Le grand livre des entorses
2003	Benoît Jutras	Nous serons sans voix
2003	Louis-Jean Thibault	Géographie des lointains
2004	André Brochu	Les jours à vif
2004	Paul Bélanger	Les jours de l'éclipse
2004	Mario Brassard	Choix d'apocalypses
2004	Louise Dupré	Une écharde sous ton ongle
2004	Pierre Ouellet	Zone franche: liber asylum
2005	Jean-Marc Desgent	Vingtièmes siècles
2005	Marc André Brouillette	M'accompagne
2005	François Dumont	Brisures
2005	Danielle Fournier	Il n'y a rien d'intact dans ma chair
2005	Fernand Ouellette	L'Inoubliable: Chronique I
2006	Hélène Dorion	Ravir: les lieux
2006	Paul Bélanger	Origine des méridiens
2006	Jacques Brault	L'artisan
2006	Louise Cotnoir	Les îles
2006	Benoît Jutras	L'Étang noir
2007	Serge Patrice Thibodeau	Seul on est
2007	Martine Audet	Les manivelles
2007	Mario Brassard	La somme des vents contraires
2007	Catherine Fortin	Le silence est une voie navigable
2007	Rino Morin Rossignol	Intifada du cœur
2008	Michel Pleau	La lenteur du monde
2008	Steve Auger	Le rosier incendiaire
2008	François Charron	Nous aurons tout vécu
2008	Henri Chassé	Morceaux de tempête
2008	Michel A. Thérien	Du vertige et de l'espoir: Carnets africains
2009	Hélène Monette	Thérèse pour joie et orchestre
2009	Normand de Bellefeuille	Mon nom
2009	René Lapierre	Traité de physique
2009	Philippe More	Brouillons pour un siècle abstrait
2009	André Roy	Les espions de Dieu

=== 2010s ===
Year	Author	Title
2010	Danielle Fournier	effleurés de lumière
2010	Francis Catalano	qu'une lueur des lieux
2010	Marie-Josée Charest	Rien que la guerre, c'est tout
2010	Carole David	Manuel de poétique à l'intention des jeunes filles
2010	Pierre Nepveu	Les verbes majeurs
2011	Louise Dupré	Plus haut que les flammes
2011	Martine Audet	Je demande pardon à l'espèce qui brille (Les Grands cimitières II)
2011	Roger Des Roches	Le nouveau temps du verbe être
2011	Patrick Lafontaine	Grève du zèle
2011	Jean-François Poupart	L'Or de Klimt
2012	Maude Smith Gagnon	Un drap. Une place.
2012	Corinne Chevarier	Anatomie de l'objet
2012	Fredric Gary Comeau	Souffles
2012	Hélène Dorion	Cœurs, comme livres d'amour
2012	Christian Saint-Germain	Tomahawk
2013	René Lapierre	Pour les désespérés seulement
2013	Mario Brassard	Le livre clarière
2013	Marie-Andrée Gill	Béante
2013	Diane Régimbald	L'insensée rayonne
2013	Rodney Saint-Éloi	Jacques Roche, je t'écris cette lettre
2014	José Acquelin	Anarchie de la lumière
2014	Joséphine Bacon	Un thé dans la toundra/Nipishapui nete mushuat
2014	Paul Chanel Malenfant	Toujours jamais
2014	Georgette LeBlanc	Prudent
2014	Julie Stanton	Mémorial pour Geneviève et autres tombeaux
2015	Joël Pourbaix	Le mal du pays est un art oublié
2015	Martine Audet	Tête première / Dos / Contre dos
2015	François Baril Pelletier	Les trésors tamisés
2015	Jean-Philippe Dupuis	Langue maternelle
2015	René Lapierre	La carte des feux
2016	Normand de Bellefeuille	Le poème est une maison de bord de mer
2016	Louise Bouchard	Personne et le soleil
2016	Antoine Dumas	Au monde inventaire
2016	Pierre Nepveu	La dureté des matières et de l'eau
2016	Rodney Saint-Éloi	Je suis la fille du baobab brûlé
2017	Louise Dupré	La Main hantée
2017	Jean-Marc Desgent	Strange Fruits
2017	Annie Lafleur	Bec-de-lièvre
2017	Judy Quinn	Pas de tombeau pour les lieux
2017	Serge Patrice Thibodeau	L'Isle Haute en marge de Grand-Pré
2018	Michaël Trahan	La raison des fleurs
2018	Daria Colonna	Ne faites pas honte à votre siècle
2018	Roxane Desjardins	Le revers
2018	Catherine Lalonde	La dévoration des fées
2018	France Théoret	Cruauté du jeu
2019	Anne-Marie Desmeules	Le tendon et l'os
2019	Michel Létourneau	La part habitée du ciel
2019	Louise Marois	La cuisine mortuaire
2019	Louis-Thomas Plamondon	Portages
2019	Chloé Savoie-Bernard	Fastes

=== 2020s ===
Year	Author	Title	Ref
2020	Martine Audet	La Société des cendres	
2020	Paul Bélanger	Déblais	
2020	Hugues Corriveau	Et là, mon père suivi de Et là, ma mère	
2020	Symon Henry	L'Amour des oiseaux moches	
2020	Louis-Karl Picard-Sioui	Les visages de la terre	
2021	Tania Langlais	Pendant que Perceval tombait	
2021	Daria Colonna	La voleuse	
2021	Chloé LaDuchesse	Exosquelette	
2021	Louise Marois	Dʼune caresse patentée	
2021	Patrick Roy	Pompéi	
2022	Maya Cousineau Mollen	Enfants du lichen	
2022	Anna Babi	Vivarium	
2022	Carole David	Le programme double de la femme tuée	
2022	Frédéric Dumont	Chambre minimum	
2022	Élise Turcotte	À mon retour	
2023	Rita Mestokosho	Atikᵁ utei. Le cœur du caribou	
2023	Virginie Chaloux-Gendron	La fabrique du noir	
2023	Louise Dupré	Exercices de joie	
2023	Sebastián Ibarra Gutiérrez	À terre ouverte	
2023	Virginie Savard	Les deuils transparents	
2024	Névé Dumas	poème dégénéré	
2024	Jonas Fortier	L'Air fou	
2024	Annie Landreville	Les couteaux dans ma gorge ne sont pas des fruits de mer	
2024	Olivier Leroux-Picard	Soleil sans heures	
2024	Emmanuel Simard	Lettres au ciel blanc	
2025	Paul Chanel Malenfant	Au passage du fleuve	
2025	Angelina Guo	Comparution	
2025	Catherine Harton	Les sutures	
2025	Stéphane Martelly	Mourir est beau	
2025	Laurence Veilleux	Aller aux corps	
2026	Vincent Lambert	Le Royaume des chuchotements	
2026	Martine Audet	À toute heure	
2026	Elissa Kayal	Histoire de ma gueule	
2026	Stéfanie Tremblay	Cinéma	
2026	Marie-Hélène Voyer	Précieux sang	
