= 1986 in poetry =

Nationality words link to articles with information on the nation's poetry or literature (for instance, Irish or France).

== Events ==
- March 4 — Ronald Reagan, President of the United States, publicly recites from memory lines from Robert W. Service's The Cremation of Sam McGee (1907)
- December 18 — Pforzheimer Collection of the works of Percy Bysshe Shelley and his circle donated to the New York Public Library
- John Montague becomes the first occupant of the Ireland Chair of Poetry
- Dissident Russian poet Dmitri Prigov is arrested by the K.G.B for distributing his samizdat poetry and briefly confined in a psychiatric hospital before being freed after protests by other poets such as Bella Akhmadulina
- New American Writing, an annual literary magazine concentrating on poetry, is founded in Chicago
- English poet Wendy Cope's Making Cocoa for Kingsley Amis is a best-seller

== Works published in English ==
Listed by nation where the work was first published and again by the poet's native land, if different; substantially revised works listed separately:

=== Canada ===
- Don Domanski, Hammerstroke Canada
- Louis Dudek, Zembla's Rocks. Montreal: Véhicule Press, 1986.
- Archibald Lampman, The Story of an Affinity, D.M.R. Bentley ed. (London, ON: Canadian Poetry Press). ISBN 978-0-921243-00-7
- Irving Layton, Dance With Desire: Love Poems. Toronto:McClelland & Stewart.
- Dennis Lee, editor, The New Canadian Poets (anthology)
- Dorothy Livesay, The Self-Completing Tree: Selected Poems. Victoria: Porcepic.
- Gwendolyn MacEwen, The Man with Three Violins. HMS Press (Toronto) ISBN 0-919957-83-8
- Anne Marriott, Letters from Some Island: New Poems, Oakville, ON: Mosaic Press.
- Michael Ondaatje:
  - All along the Mazinaw: Two Poems (broadside), Canadian published in the United States; Milwaukie: Woodland Pattern
  - Two Poems, Woodland Pattern, Milwaukie
- Raymond Souster, It Takes All Kinds. Ottawa: Oberon Press,
- Wilfred Watson, Collected Poems (introduction by Thomas Peacocke)

=== India, in English ===
- Jayanta Mahapatra, Dispossessed Nests ( Poetry in English ), Jaipur: Nirala Publications
- Vikram Seth, The Golden Gate: A Novel in Verse
- Suniti Namjoshi, Flesh and Paper, (with Gillian Hanscombe), Jezebel Tapes and Books, Devon, ISBN 1-870240-00-6 and Ragweed, ISBN 0-920304-64-8
- V. K. Gokak, editor, The Golden Treasury of Indo-Anglian Poetry, New Delhi: Sahitya Academy; anthology
- Niranjan Mohanty, editor, The Golden Voices: Poets from Orissa Writing in English, Berhampur University: Poetry Publications; anthology

=== Ireland ===
- Eavan Boland, The Journey, and Other Poems, Irish poet published in the United Kingdom
- Dermot Bolger, Internal Exiles
- Seamus Heaney, Clearances, Cornamona Press, Northern Irish native at this time living in the United States
- Alan Moore (poet) Opia, Anvil Press Poetry, ISBN 0-85646-161-X, Irish poet published in the United Kingdom
- Paul Muldoon, Selected Poems 1968–1983, including "Lunch with Pancho Villa", "Cuba", "Anseo", "Gathering Mushrooms", "The More a Man Has the More a Man Wants", Faber and Faber, Irish poet published in the United Kingdom
- Eiléan Ní Chuilleanáin: The Second Voyage, Dublin: The Gallery Press
- Frank Ormsby, A Northern Spring, including "Home", Oldcastle: The Gallery Press
- James Simmons, Poems 1956–1986, including "One of the Boys", "West Strand Visions" and "From the Irish", Oldcastle: The Gallery Press

=== New Zealand ===
- Fleur Adcock (New Zealand poet who moved to England in 1963):
  - Hotspur: a ballad, Newcastle upon Tyne: Bloodaxe Books (New Zealand poet who moved to England in 1963)
  - The Incident Book, Oxford and New York: Oxford University Press
- Alan Brunton, New Order, New York:Red Mole, work by a New Zealand poet in the United States
- Allen Curnow, The Loop in Lone Kauri Road: Poems 1983–1985
- Lauris Edmond, Seasons and Creatures
- Cilla McQueen, Wild Sweets
- Les Murray, editor, Anthology of Australian Religious Poetry, Melbourne, Collins Dove (new edition, 1991)
- Norman Simms, Silence and Invisibility: A Study of the New Literature from the Pacific, Australia, and New Zealand, scholarship

=== United Kingdom ===
- Dannie Abse, Ask the Bloody Horse
- Fleur Adcock (New Zealand poet who moved to England in 1963):
  - The Incident Book, Oxford and New York: Oxford University Press
  - Selected Poems, Oxford and New York : Oxford University Press
- Eavan Boland, The Journey, and Other Poems, Irish poet published in the United Kingdom
- Charles Causley, Early in the Morning
- Jack Clemo, A Different Drummer
- Tony Connor, Spirits of Place
- Wendy Cope, Making Cocoa for Kingsley Amis
- Kevin Crossley-Holland, Waterslain
- Carol Ann Duffy, Thrown Voices
- Helen Dunmore, The Sea Skater
- Elaine Feinstein, Badlands, Hutchinson
- Roy Fuller, Outside the Canon
- Seamus Heaney: Clearances, Cornamona Press, Northern Ireland native at this time living in the United States
- Adrian Henri, Collected Poems
- Ted Hughes, Flowers and Insects
- George MacBeth, The Cleaver Garden
- Edwin Morgan, From the Video Box
- Grace Nichols, Whole of a Morning Sky
- Fiona Pitt-Kethley, Sky Ray Lolly
- Peter Reading, Stet
- E. J. Scovell, Listening to Collared Doves
- Penelope Shuttle, The Lion From Rio
- Jon Silkin, The Ship's Pasture
- John Stallworthy, The Anzac Sonata
- R.S. Thomas, Experimenting with an Amen
- Abdullah al-Udhari, editor and translator, Modern Poetry of the Arab World, Penguin, anthology

=== United States ===
- A.R. Ammons, The Selected Poems: Expanded Edition
- Ralph Angel, Anxious Latitudes
- Gwendolyn Brooks, The Near-Johannesburg Boy and Other Poems
- Alan Brunton, New Order, New York:Red Mole, work by a New Zealand poet in the United States
- Raymond Carver, Ultramarine
- Henri Cole, The Marble Queen
- Lawrence Ferlinghetti, Over All the Obscene Boundaries
- Alice Fulton, Palladium
- Marilyn Hacker, Love, Death and the Changing of the Seasons
- Seamus Heaney: Clearances, Cornamona Press, Northern Ireland native at this time living in the United States
- John Hollander, In Time and Place
- Paul Hoover, Nervous Songs, (L'Epervier Press)
- Jane Kenyon, The Boat of Quiet Hours
- Li-Young Lee, Rose
- Mary Oliver, Dream Work
- Michael Ondaatje:
  - All along the Mazinaw: Two Poems (broadside), Canadian published in the United States; Milwaukie: Woodland Pattern
  - Two Poems, Woodland Pattern, Milwaukie
- Carl Rakosi, Collected Poems published by the National Poetry Foundation
- Vikram Seth, The Golden Gate: A Novel in Verse
- Rosmarie Waldrop, Streets Enough to Welcome Snow (Station Hill)

==== Anthologies in the United States ====
- Philip Dacey and David Jauss, editors of the New Formalist anthology, Strong Measures: Contemporary American Poetry in Traditional Forms
- Ron Silliman, editor, In the American Tree, anthology of Language poets

=== Other in English ===
- Paula Burnett, Penguin Book of Caribbean Verse, anthology
- Derek Walcott, Collected Poems, St. Lucia native living in the United States

== Works published in other languages ==
=== Danish ===
- Jørgen Gustava Brandt, Giv dagen dit lys ("Give the Day Your Light")
- Niels Frank, Digte i kim, Denmark
- Christian Graugaard, Kan jeg købe dine øjnes blå dans ("Can I Buy Your Eyes Blue Dance")

=== French language ===
- Kama Sywor Kamanda, Chants de brumes, Congo native writing in French
- Abdellatif Laabi, L'Écorché vif. L'Harmattan, Paris, Moroccan author writing in and published in France
- Jean Royer, Le chemin brûlé, Montréal: l'Hexagone; Canada
- Marie Uguay, Poèmes (contains Signe et rumeur, L'Outre-vie, and Autoportraits) French-Canada (posthumously published)

=== India ===
Listed in alphabetical order by first name:

- Nirendranath Chakravarti, Jabotiyo Bhalobashabashi, Kolkata: Proma Prokashoni; Bengali-language
- Rajendra Bhandari, Yee shabdaharu: yee harafharu ("These Words: These Lines"), Gangtok, Sikkim: Jana Paksha Prakashan; Nepali-language
- Sitanshu Yashaschandra, Jatayu, Mumbai and Ahmedabad: R R Sheth & Co.; Gujarati-language
- Namdeo Dhasal, Gandu Bagicha Marathi-language
- Varavara Rao (better known as "VV"), Bhavishyathu Chitrapatam or Bhavishyattu Chitrapatam ("Portrait of the Future"), Vijayawada: Vijayakrishna Printers; Telugu-language
- Mehr Lal Soni Zia Fatehabadi, Naram garam hawain (The soft Warm Air) - published posthumously by R.K.Sehgal, Bazm-e-Seemab, J 5/21, Rajouri Garden, New Delhi.

=== Poland ===
- Stanisław Barańczak, Atlantyda i inne wiersze z lat 1981-85 ("Atlantis and Other Poems"), London: Puls
- Juliusz Erazm Bolek, Nago
- Ernest Bryll, Adwent ("Advent"), London
- Ewa Lipska, Utwory wybrane ("Selected Work"), Kraków: Wydawnictwo literackie
- Bronisław Maj:
  - Album rodzinny ("Family Album"); Cracow: Oficyna Literacka
  - Zaglada świętego miasta ("Destruction of the Holy City"); London: Puls
  - Zmęczenie ("Fatigue"); Cracow: Znak
- Piotr Sommer, Czynnik liryczny
- Jan Twardowski, Nie przyszedłem pana nawracać. Wiersze z lat 1937- 1985 ("I Did Not Come to Convert You: Poems From the Years 1937-1985"), Warsaw: Wydawnictwo Archidiecezji Warszawskiej

=== Other languages ===
- Mario Benedetti, Preguntas al azar ("Random Questions"), Uruguay
- Christoph Buchwald, general editor, and Elke Erb, guest editor, Luchterhand Jahrbuch der Lyrik 1986 ("Luchterhand Poetry Yearbook 1986"), publisher: Luchterhand Literaturverlag; anthology
- Matilde Camus, Sin teclado de fiebre ("Without a fever keyboard"), Spain
- Osman Durrani, editor, German Poetry of the Romantic Era (with poetry in German), anthology, Leamington Spa, England: Oswald, Wolf and Berg (publisher)
- Jon Fosse, Engel med vatn i augene, Norway
- Nizar Qabbani, Poems Inciting Anger, Syrian poet writing in Arabic
- Maria Luisa Spaziani, La stella del libero arbitrio, Italy
- Wisława Szymborska: Ludzie na moście ("People on the Bridge"), Poland
- Andrei Voznesensky, The Ditch: A Spiritual Trial, prose and poetry primarily about a 1941 German massacre of 12,000 Russians in the Crimea and the looting of their mass graves in the 1980s by Soviet citizens. Addressing a topic long suppressed by the Soviet government, the work made clear that most of the victims were Jews, and it implied this was why Soviet authorities tolerated the grave robbing. Russian-language work published in the Soviet Union.
- Wang Xiaoni, Wode shixuan ("My Selected Poems"), China

== Awards and honors ==
=== Australia ===
- C. J. Dennis Prize for Poetry: Rhyll McMaster, Washing the Money : Poems with Photographs and John A. Scott, St. Clair
- Kenneth Slessor Prize for Poetry: Robert Gray Selected Poems 1963-1983
- Mary Gilmore Prize: Stephen Williams - A Crowd of Voices

=== Canada ===
- Gerald Lampert Award: Joan Fern Shaw, Raspberry Vinegar
- Archibald Lampman Award: Colin Morton, This Won't Last Forever
- 1986 Governor General's Awards: Al Purdy, The Collected Poems of Al Purdy (English); Cécile Cloutier, L'écouté (French)
- Pat Lowther Award: Erín Moure, Domestic Fuel
- Dorothy Livesay Poetry Prize: Joe Rosenblatt, Poetry Hotel
- Prix Émile-Nelligan: Carole David, Terroristes d'amour and France Mongeau, Lumières

=== United Kingdom ===
- Cholmondeley Award: Lawrence Durrell, James Fenton, Selima Hill
- Eric Gregory Award: Mick North, Lachlan Mackinnon, Oliver Reynolds, Stephen Romer
- Queen's Gold Medal for Poetry: Norman MacCaig

=== United States ===
- Agnes Lynch Starrett Poetry Prize: Robley Wilson, Kingdoms of the Ordinary
- AML Award for poetry to Dennis Marden Clark for "Sunwatch"
- Bernard F. Connors Prize for Poetry: John Koethe, "Mistral"
- Frost Medal: Allen Ginsberg / Richard Eberhart
- Poet Laureate Consultant in Poetry to the Library of Congress appointed: Robert Penn Warren
- Pulitzer Prize for Poetry: Henry Taylor, The Flying Change
- Rhysling Award:
  - Andrew Joron, Shipwrecked on Destiny Five (Long Form)
  - Susan Palwick, The Neighbour's Wife (Short Form)
- Ruth Lilly Poetry Prize: Adrienne Rich
- Whiting Awards: John Ash, Hayden Carruth, Frank Stewart, Ruth Stone
- Fellowship of the Academy of American Poets: Irving Feldman and Howard Moss

== Births ==
- September 22 – Elena Zhambalova (died 2025), Russian poet
- November – Raymond Antrobus, English poet and educator
- Caroline Bird, English poet
- Fateme Ekhtesari, Persian poet and midwife

== Deaths ==
Birth years link to the corresponding "[year] in poetry" article:

- January 4 – Christopher Isherwood (born 1904), English-born American novelist and poet
- January 9 – W. S. Graham (born 1918), Scottish poet
- January 12 – Bob Kaufman, at 60 (born 1925), American Beat poet, of emphysema
- March 4 – Elizabeth Smart, at 72 (born 1913), Canadian poet and novelist
- March 8 – Kersti Merilaas, at 72 (born 1913), Estonian poet, translator and author of children's fiction
- March 30 – John Ciardi, at 69 (born 1916), American poet, translator and etymologist, of a heart attack
- April 15 – Jean Genet, at 75 (born 1910), French novelist, playwright, poet, essayist and political activist
- April 21 – Salah Jahin, also spelled "Salah Jaheen" صلاح جاهين (born 1930), Egyptian, Arabic-language poet, lyricist, playwright and cartoonist
- April 21 – Audrey Longbottom (born c. 1922), Australian
- May 25 – Carlo Betocchi, at 87 (born 1899), Italian poet
- June 7 – Atul Chandra Hazarika (born 1903), Indian, writing in Assamese; poet, dramatist, children's story writer and translator; called "Sahitycharjya" by an Assamese literary society
- June 24 – Rex Warner (born 1905), English classicist, author, poet and translator
- July 13 – Brion Gysin, at 70 (born 1916), English painter, writer, sound poet and performance artist
- August 19 – Mehr Lal Soni Zia Fatehabadi, at 73 (born 1913), Urdu poet, essayist, critic, biographer
- August 20 – Milton Acorn, at 63 (born 1923), Canadian poet, writer and playwright, of heart disease and diabetes
- August 31 – Elizabeth Coatsworth, at 93 (born 1893), American author of children's fiction and poetry
- November 10 – Laurence Collinson (born 1925), Australian playwright, actor, poet, journalist and secondary school teacher, in London
- December 8 – Henry Reed, at 72 (born 1914), English poet, translator, radio playwright and journalist

== See also ==
- Poetry
- List of years in poetry
- List of poetry awards
