= 2001 in poetry =

Nationality words link to articles with information on the nation's poetry or literature (for instance, Irish or France).

== Events ==
- Immediately after the September 11 attacks in the United States, W. H. Auden's "September 1, 1939" was read (with many lines omitted) on National Public Radio and widely circulated and discussed for its relevance to recent events. On September 19, Amiri Baraka read his poem "Somebody Blew Up America?" at a poetry festival in New Jersey.
- December 9–10 — Professor John Basinger, 67, performed, from memory, John Milton's Paradise Lost at Three Rivers Community-Technical College in Norwich, Connecticut, a feat that took 18 hours.
- American computer hacker Seth Schoen wrote DeCSS haiku as one of a number of artworks intended to demonstrate that source code should be accorded the privileges of freedom of speech.
- In The Best American Poetry 2001, poet and guest editor Robert Hass wrote, "There are roughly three traditions in American poetry at this point: a metrical tradition that can be very nervy and that is also basically classical in impulse; a strong central tradition of free verse made out of both romanticism and modernism, split between the impulses of an inward and psychological writing and an outward and realist one, at its best fusing the two; and an experimental tradition that is usually more passionate about form than content, perception than emotion, restless with the conventions of the art, skeptical about the political underpinnings of current practice, and intent on inventing a new one, or at least undermining what seems repressive in the current formed style. [...] At the moment there are poets doing good, bad, and indifferent work in all these ranges." Critic Maureen McLane said of Hass' description that "it's hard to imagine a more judicious account of major tendencies."
- The appointment of Billy Collins as Poet Laureate Consultant in Poetry to the Library of Congress generated a protest in which Anselm Hollo was elected "anti-laureate" in a contest run by Robert Archambeau (the influential online POETICS list at the University of Buffalo served as the main forum).

== Works published in English ==
Listed by nation where the work was first published and again by the poet's native land, if different; substantially revised works listed separately:

=== Australia ===
- Robert Adamson Mulberry Leaves: New & Selected Poems 1970–2001
- Les Murray, Conscious & Verbal, shortlisted for the 2002 International Griffin Poetry Prize
- Philip Salom, A Cretive Life. (sic.) (Fremantle Arts Centre) ISBN 978-1-86368-300-5
- Chris Wallace-Crabbe, By and Large, Manchester: Carcanet; and Sydney; Brandl and Schlesinger

=== Canada ===
- Bruce Andrews, Lip Service (Coach House Books) ISBN 978-1-55245-063-5
- Louise Bak, Tulpa (Coach House Books) ISBN 978-1-55245-083-3
- Gary Barwin, Raising Eyebrows (Coach House Books) ISBN 978-1-55245-094-9
- Christian Bök, Eunoia, winner of the 2002 Canadian Griffin Poetry Prize (Coach House Books) ISBN 978-1-933368-15-3
- George Elliott Clarke:
  - Execution Poems: The Black Acadian Tragedy of George and Rue. Wolfville, Nova Scotia, Gaspereau Press, ISBN 1-894031-48-2 Canada
  - Blue. Vancouver: Polestar, ISBN 1-55192-414-5
- Victor Coleman, Honeymoon Suite/Letter Drop, illustrations by David Bolduc, (Coach House Books) ISBN 978-1-55245-096-3
- Diane Keating, The Year One: New and Selected Poems
- Karen MacCormack, At Issue (Coach House Books) ISBN 978-1-55245-093-2
- Steve McCaffery:
  - Seven Pages Missing Volume 1 (Coach House Books) ISBN 978-1-55245-049-9
  - Seven Pages Missing Volume 2: Selected Ungathered Work (Coach House Books) ISBN 978-1-55245-051-2
- Roy Miki, Surrender winner of the 2002 Governor General's Award for poetry
- W. Mark Sutherland, Code X (Coach House Books) ISBN 978-1-55245-075-8
- Sharon Thesen, editor, The New Long Poem Anthology, Burnaby, British Columbia: Talonbooks
- Daniel Wincenty, Words of Wisdom from a Man Claiming to be Fred Rogers (Coach House Books) ISBN 978-1-55245-067-3

=== India, in English ===
- Imtiaz Dharker, I Speak for the Devil ( Poetry in English ), first foreign edition brought out from United Kingdom by Bloodaxe (first India edition: Penguin Books India, 2003)
- Ranjit Hoskote, The Sleepwalker's Archive ( Poetry in English ), Mumbai: Single File
- Arundhathi Subramaniam, On Cleaning Bookshelves ( Poetry in English ), Mumbai: Allied Publishers, ISBN 81-7764-176-X
- Sudeep Sen, Perpetual Diary, London: Aark Arts
- K. Satchidanandan, So Many Births: Three Decades of Poetry, Konarak Publishers Pvt Ltd, Delhi

=== Ireland ===
- Pat Boran, As the Hand, the Glove (Dedalus)
- Eiléan Ní Chuilleanáin: The Girl Who Married the Reindeer, Oldcastle: The Gallery Press, Ireland
- Tom French (poet), Touching the Bones, Oldcastle: The Gallery Press, ISBN 978-1-85235-306-3
- Seamus Heaney, Electric Light, Faber & Faber; Irish poet published in the United Kingdom
- Paul Muldoon, Poems 1968–1998 (Farrar, Straus & Giroux); a New York Times "notable book of the year"; Irish poet living in the United States
- Aidan Murphy (poet), Looking in at Eden, New Island Books, ISBN 978-1-902602-47-9

=== New Zealand ===
- Alistair Campbell, Maori Battalion: a poetic sequence, Wellington: Wai-te-ata Press
- Allen Curnow, The Bells of Saint Babel's, a winner of the Montana New Zealand Book Awards
- Leigh Davis:
  - The Book of Hours, Auckland: Jack Books
  - General Motors, Auckland: Jack Books
- Lauris Edmond, Selected Poems 1975–2000, edited by K. O. Arvidson, Wellington: Bridget Williams Books, posthumous
- Bill Manhire, Collected Poems
- Cilla McQueen, Axis, Otago University Press
- Paul Millar, Spark to a Waiting Fuse: James K. Baxter's Correspondence with Noel Ginn 1942–1946
- Michael O'Leary, He Waiatanui Kia Aroha
- Hone Tuwhare, Piggyback Moon
- Ian Wedde, The Commonplace Odes
- Kate Camp, Realia, Victoria University Press

=== United Kingdom ===
- Eavan Boland, Code
- Ciarán Carson: The Twelfth of Never, Picador, Wake Forest University Press
- Kate Clanchy, Slattern
- Carol Ann Duffy, editor, Hand in Hand: An Anthology of Love Poems, Picador (anthology); 36 poets from around the world were each invited to select a love poem written by someone of the opposite sex and appearing opposite the selecting poet's own love poem
- James Fenton: A Garden from a Hundred Packets of Seed, Viking / Farrar, Straus and Giroux
- Seamus Heaney, Electric Light, Faber & Faber; Irish poet published in the United Kingdom
- Geoffrey Hill, Speech! Speech!
- Selima Huill, Bunny
- Elizabeth Jennings, Timely Issues
- Derek Mahon, Selected Poems. Penguin
- Andrew Motion, Here to Eternity
- Paul Muldoon, Vera of Las Vegas; Irish poet living in the United States and published in the United Kingdom
- Sean O'Brien, Downriver (Picador)
- Craig Raine, Collected Poems 1978–1999
- Peter Reading, [untitled]
- W. G. Sebald For Years Now. Short Books.
- Jo Shapcott, Tender Taxes
- Hugo Williams, Curtain Call: 101 Portraits in Verse, (editor) Faber and Faber
- Benjamin Zephaniah, Too Black, Too Strong

==== Criticism, scholarship and biography in the United Kingdom ====
- Stephen Wade, editor, Gladsongs and Gatherings: Poetry and Its Social Context in Liverpool Since the 1960s, Liverpool University Press, ISBN 0-85323-727-1

==== Anthologies in the United Kingdom ====
- Keith Tuma, Anthology of Twentieth-Century British and Irish Poetry (Oxford University Press)
- Elaine Feinstein, Ted Hughes – The Life of a Poet, Weidenfeld & Nicolson

=== United States ===
- Elizabeth Alexander, Antebellum Dream Book
- Ralph Angel, Twice Removed (Sarabande)
- Renée Ashley, The Revisionist's Dream
- Bei Dao, At the Sky's Edge: Poems 1991–1996 (New Directions) ISBN 0-8112-1495-8
- Eavan Boland, Against Love Poetry (Norton); a New York Times "notable book of the year"
- Edward Brathwaite, Ancestors, Barbadian poet living in the United States
- Joseph Brodsky: Nativity Poems, translated by Melissa Green; New York: Farrar, Straus & Giroux, Russian-American
- Paul Celan, translated by John Felstiner, Selected Poems and Prose of Paul Celan (Norton); a New York Times "notable book of the year"
- Maxine Chernoff, World: Poems 1991–2001 (Salt Publications)
- Billy Collins, Sailing Alone Around the Room: New and Selected Poems (Random House); a New York Times "notable book of the year" (ISBN 0-375-50380-3)
- W.S. Di Piero, Skirts and Slacks: Poems (Knopf); a New York Times "notable book of the year"
- Ed Dorn, Chemo Sábe, Limberlost Press (posthumous)
- Alice Fulton, Felt (Norton); a Los Angeles Times "Best Book of 2001"
- Seamus Heaney, Electric Light (Farrar, Straus & Giroux); a New York Times "notable book of the year"; Irish poet living in the United States
- Jane Hirshfield, Given Sugar, Given Salt
- Paul Hoover, Rehearsal in Black, (Cambridge, England: Salt Publications)
- James Merrill, Collected Poems, edited by J.D. McClatchy and Stephen Yenser (Knopf); a New York Times "notable book of the year"
- W. S. Merwin, The Pupil, New York: Knopf
- Paul Muldoon, Poems 1968–1998 (Farrar, Straus & Giroux); a New York Times "notable book of the year"; Irish poet living in the United States
- Amos Oz, The Same Sea (Harcourt); a novel about sexual hanky-panky involving a man, son and several women; most of the book is in verse; the author collaborated on the translation by Nicholas de Lange); a New York Times "notable book of the year"
- Carl Phillips, The Tether
- James Reiss, Ten Thousand Good Mornings
- Jay Wright, Transfigurations: Collected Poems (Louisiana State University Press); a New York Times "notable book of the year"

==== Anthologies in the United States ====
- Caroline Kennedy, editor, The Best-Loved Poems of Jacqueline Kennedy Onassis, a hardcover New York Times best seller for 15 weeks late this year and into 2002.
- Michelle Yeh and N. G. D. Malmqvist, Frontier Taiwan: An Anthology of Contemporary Chinese Poetry, Columbia University Press
- The Best American Poetry 2001, edited by David Lehman, co-edited this year by Robert Hass (including 75 poets)

==== Criticism, scholarship and biography in the United States ====
- Kate Sontag and David Graham, editors, After Confession: Poetry as Autobiography, Graywolf Press

=== Other in English ===
- Edward Brathwaite, Ancestors, Barbadian poet living in the United States
- Pamela Mordecai, Certifiable, Jamaican

== Works published in other languages ==
Listed by nation where the work was first published and again by the poet's native land, if different; substantially revised works listed separately:

=== French language ===
==== Canada, in French ====
- Edmond Robillard, Du temps que le goglu chantait, Montréal: Maxime
- Jean Royer, Nos corps habitables: Poèmes choisis, 1984–2000, Montréal: Le Noroît

==== France ====
- Yves Bonnefoy:
  - Le Théâtre des enfants
  - Le Cœur-espace
  - Les Planches courbes
- Seyhmus Dagtekin, Le verbe temps, publisher: L'Harmattan; Kurdish Turkish poet writing in and published in France
- Claude Esteban:
  - Morceaux de ciel, presque rien, Gallimard
  - Etranger devant la porte, I. Variations, Farrago

=== India ===
In each section, listed in alphabetical order by first name:

==== Bengali ====
- Mallika Sengupta:
  - Deoyalir Rat, Kolkata: Patralekha
  - Amra Lasya Amra Ladai, Kolkata: Sristi Prakashani
- Nirendranath Chakravarti, Kobi Cheney, Shompurno Cheney Na, Kolkata: Dey's Publishing; Bengali-language

==== Other in India ====
- Basudev Sunani, Asprushya, Bhubaneswar: National Institute of Social Work and Social Sciences; Oraya-language
- Gulzar, Triveni, New Delhi: Rupa& Co.; in both Urdu and Hindi languages
- Hemant Divate, Chautishiparyantachya Kavita, Mumbai: Prabhat Prakashan; Marathi-language
- Malathi Maithri, Sankarabharani, Nagercoil: Kalachuvadu Pathippagam; Tamil-language
- Manushya Puthiran, Neeralanathu, Nagercoil: Kalachuvadu Pathipagam, Tamil language
- Nitin Kulkarni, Sagla Kasa Agdi Safehaina, Mumbai: Lokvangmaya Griha Prakashan; Marathi-language

=== Poland ===
- Juliusz Erazm Bolek, Ars poetica
- Julia Hartwig, Nie ma odpowiedzi ("There's no Answer"), 98 pages; Warsaw: Sic! ISBN 83-86056-98-3
- Ewa Lipska, Sklepy zoologiczne ("Pet Shops"); Kraków: Wydawnictwo literackie
- Tadeusz Różewicz, Nożyk profesora ("The Professor's Knife"), Wrocław: Wydawnictwo Dolnośląskie
- Tomasz Różycki, Chata Umaita ("Country Cottage"), Warsaw: Lampa i Iskra Boża
- Jan Twardowski, Kiedy mówisz. When You Say, Kraków: Wydawnictwo Literackie, Kraków: Wydawnictwo Literackie

=== Other languages ===
- Christoph Buchwald, general editor, and Adolf Endler, guest editor, Jahrbuch der Lyrik 2002 ("Poetry Yearbook 2002"), publisher: Beck; anthology; Germany
- Katrine Marie Guldager, Ankomst Husumgade, publisher: Gyldendal; Denmark
- Klaus Høeck, In nomine, publisher: Gyldendal; Denmark
- Chen Kehua, Hua yu lei yu heliu ("Flowers and Tears and Rivers") Chinese (Taiwan)
- Jun Er, Chenmo yu xuanhua de shijie ("Quiet in a Tumultuous World"), Chinese (People's Republic of China)
- Rahman Henry, Circusmukhorito Graam, ( A Book of Poetry ), Bangladesh.
- Rie Yasumi, 平凡な兎 ("Ordinary Rabbit") and やすみりえのとっておき川柳道場 ("Senryu Dojo reserve: Fun begins at any time"), Japan

== Awards and honors ==
=== Australia ===
- C. J. Dennis Prize for Poetry: John Mateer, Barefoot Speech
- Dinny O'Hearn Poetry Prize: Untold Lives and Later Poems by Rosemary Dobson
- Kenneth Slessor Prize for Poetry: Ken Taylor, Africa
- Miles Franklin Award: Frank Moorhouse, Dark Palace

=== Canada ===
- Gerald Lampert Award: Anne Simpson, Light Falls Through You
- Archibald Lampman Award: Colin Morton, Coastlines of the Archipelago
- Atlantic Poetry Prize: Anne Simpson, Light Falls Through You
- 2001 Governor General's Awards: George Elliott Clarke, Execution Poems (English); Paul Chanel Malenfant, Des ombres portées (French)
- Griffin Poetry Prize (Canada): Anne Carson, Men in the Off Hours
- Griffin Poetry Prize (International, in the English Language): Nikolai Popov and Heather McHugh, translation of Glottal Stop: 101 Poems by Paul Celan
- Pat Lowther Award: Sharon Thesen, A Pair of Scissors
- Prix Alain-Grandbois: Martine Audet, Les tables
- Dorothy Livesay Poetry Prize: Don McKay, Another Gravity
- Prix Émile-Nelligan: Mathieu Boily, Le grand respir

=== New Zealand ===
- Prime Minister's Awards for Literary Achievement:
- Montana New Zealand Book Awards (no winner in poetry category this year) First-book award for poetry: Stephanie de Montalk, Animals Indoors, Victoria University Press

=== United Kingdom ===
- Cholmondeley Award: Ian Duhig, Paul Durcan, Kathleen Jamie, Grace Nichols
- Eric Gregory Award: Leontia Flynn, Thomas Warner, Tishani Doshi, Patrick Mackie, Kathryn Gray, Sally Read
- Forward Poetry Prize (Best Collection): Sean O'Brien, Downriver (Picador)
- Forward Poetry Prize (Best First Collection): John Stammers, The Panoramic Lounge Bar (Picador)
- Queen's Gold Medal for Poetry: Michael Longley
- T. S. Eliot Prize (United Kingdom and Ireland): Anne Carson, The Beauty of the Husband
- Whitbread Award for poetry: Selima Hill, Bunny

=== United States ===
- Agnes Lynch Starrett Poetry Prize awarded to Gabriel Gudding for A Defense of Poetry
- Aiken Taylor Award for Modern American Poetry, Frederick Morgan
- American Book Award, Janet McAdams, for "The Island of Lost Luggage"
- Bernard F. Connors Prize for Poetry, Gabrielle Calvocoressi, for "Circus Fire, 1944"
- Bollingen Prize for Poetry, Louise Glück
- Brittingham Prize in Poetry, Robin Behn, Horizon Note
- Frost Medal: Sonia Sanchez
- National Book Award for Poetry: Alan Dugan, Poems Seven: New and Complete Poetry
- Poet Laureate Consultant in Poetry to the Library of Congress: Billy Collins appointed
- Poets' Prize: Philip Booth, Lifelines: Selected Poems 1950–1999
- Pulitzer Prize for Poetry: Stephen Dunn, Different Hours
- Rhysling Award:
  - Joe Haldeman, January Fires (Long Form)
  - Bruce Boston, My Wife Returns As She Would Have It (Short Form)
- Robert Fitzgerald Prosody Award: Edward Weismiller
- Ruth Lilly Poetry Prize: Yusef Komunyakaa
- Wallace Stevens Award: John Ashbery
- Whiting Awards: Joel Brouwer, Jason Sommer
- William Carlos Williams Award: Ralph J. Mills, Grasses Standing: Selected Poems, Judge: Fanny Howe

=== Other ===
- France: Prix Goncourt for poetry: Claude Esteban, for his oeuvre as a whole

== Deaths ==
Birth years link to the corresponding "[year] in poetry" article:

- January 17 – Gregory Corso (born 1930), American Beat Generation poet, of prostate cancer
- February 25 – A. R. Ammons (born 1926), American author and poet
- February 14 – Alan Ross (born 1922), British writer and poet
- February 22 – Leo Connellan (born 1928), American poet
- March 23 – Louis Dudek (born 1918), Canadian poet, academic critic and publisher
- August 28 – Sansei Yamao (born 1938), Japanese poet and friend of the American poet Gary Snyder
- September 23 – Allen Curnow (born 1911), New Zealand poet and journalist
- October 16 – Anne Ridler (born 1912), English poet and Faber and Faber editor
- October 20 – Andrew Waterhouse (born 1958), English poet and environmentalist, suicide
- October 26:
  - Pamela Gillilan (born 1918), English poet
  - Elizabeth Jennings (born 1926), English poet
- November 18 – R. N. Currey (born 1907), English poet
- November 25 – David Gascoyne (born 1915), English poet associated with the Surrealist movement
- December 8 – Agha Shahid Ali (born 1949), Kashmiri-born English-language American poet
- December 20 – Léopold Sédar Senghor (born 1906), first President of Senegal, poet and writer
- December 27 – Ian Hamilton (born 1938), British poet, critic and magazine publisher
- Date not known – Bill Sewell (born 1951), New Zealand poet, German literary scholar and lawyer

== See also ==
- Poetry
- List of years in poetry
- List of poetry awards

== Notes ==
- "A Timeline of English Poetry" Web page of the Representative Poetry Online Web site, University of Toronto
