= 2001 Governor General's Awards =

Canadian literary award

The 2001 Governor General's Awards for Literary Merit were presented by Adrienne Clarkson, Governor General of Canada, at a ceremony at Rideau Hall on November 14. Each winner received a cheque for $15,000.

== English ==
Category	Winner	Nominated
Fiction	Richard B. Wright, Clara Callan	Yann Martel, Life of Pi; Tessa McWatt, Dragons Cry; Jane Urquhart, The Stone Carvers; Thomas Wharton, Salamander
Non-fiction	Thomas Homer-Dixon, The Ingenuity Gap	Susan Crean, The Laughing One: A Journey to Emily Carr; Ross A. Laird, Grain of Truth: The Ancient Lessons of Craft; Alberto Manguel, Reading Pictures: A History of Love and Hate; Jack Todd, The Taste of Metal: A Deserter's Story
Poetry	George Elliott Clarke, Execution Poems	Anne Carson, Men in the Off Hours; Phil Hall, Trouble Sleeping; Robert Kroetsch, The Hornbooks of Rita K.; Steve McCaffery, Seven Pages Missing
Drama	Kent Stetson, The Harps of God	Mark Brownell, Monsieur d'Eon; Clem Martini, A Three Martini Lunch; Michael Redhill, Building Jerusalem; Jason Sherman, An Acre of Time: The Play
Children's literature	Arthur Slade, Dust	Brian Doyle, Mary Ann Alice; Beth Goobie, Before Wings; Julie Johnston, In Spite of Killer Bees; Teresa Toten, The Game
Children's illustration	Mireille Levert, An Island in the Soup	Harvey Chan, Wild Bog Tea; Murray Kimber, The Wolf of Gubbio; Kim LaFave, We'll All Go Sailing; Cindy Revell, Mallory and the Power Boy
French to English translation	Fred A. Reed and David Homel, Fairy Ring (Martine Desjardins, Le Cercle de Clara)	Sheila Fischman, The Little Girl Who Was Too Fond of Matches (Gaétan Soucy, La petite fille qui aimait trop les allumettes); Gail Scott, The Sailor's Disquiet (Michael Delisle, Le Désarroi du matelot)

== French ==
Category	Winner	Nominated
Fiction	Andrée A. Michaud, Le ravissement	Marie-Claire Blais, Dans la foudre et la lumière; Rachel Leclerc, Ruelle Océan
Non-fiction	Renée Dupuis, Quel Canada pour les Autochtones? La fin de l'exclusion	Jacques Allard, Le roman du Québec: Histoire, perspectives, lectures; Michel Biron, L'absence du maître : Saint-Denys Garneau, Ferron, Ducharme; Madeleine Gagnon, Les Femmes et la guerre; Jacques B. Gélinas, La globalisation du monde: laisser faire ou faire?
Poetry	Paul Chanel Malenfant, Des ombres portées	Tania Langlais, Douze bêtes aux chemises de l'homme; Hélène Monette, Un jardin dans la nuit; Stefan Psenak, La beauté; Jean-Philippe Raîche, Une lettre au bout du monde
Drama	Normand Chaurette, Le Petit Köchel	François Archambault, Code 99; Réjane Charpentier, Un Autre Monde; Michel Ouellette, "Requiem", in Requiem suivi de Fausse route
Children's literature	Christiane Duchesne, Jomusch et le troll des cuisines	Cécile Gagnon, Le chien de Pavel; Ann Lamontagne, Les mémoires interdites; Marthe Pelletier, Chante pour moi, Charlotte; Jean-Michel Schembré, Le noir passage
Children's illustration	Bruce Roberts, Fidèles éléphants	Marjolaine Bonenfant, L'abécédaire des animots; Pascale Constantin, Alexis, chevalier des nuits; Stéphane Poulin, Vieux Thomas et la petite fée; Mylène Pratt, Le dimanche de Madame B
English to French translation	Michel Saint-Germain, No Logo: La Tyrannie des marques	Agnès Guitard, Les hauturiers: ils précédèrent les Vikings en Amérique; Maryse Warda, Motel de passage
