= Prix Alain-Grandbois =

The Prix Alain-Grandbois or Alain Grandbois Prize is awarded each year to an author for a book of poetry. The jury is composed of three members of the Académie des lettres du Québec. It is named after writer Alain Grandbois.

== Prize recipients ==
- 1988 - Pierre Morency, Effets personnels
- 1989 - Jean Royer, Poèmes d'amour
- 1990 - Juan Garcia, Corps du gloire
- 1991 - Jacques Brault, Il n'y a plus de chemin
- 1992 - Monique Bosco, Miserere
- 1993 - Anne Hébert, Le Jour n'a d'égal que la nuit
- 1994 - Gilbert Langevin, Le Cercle ouvert
- 1995 - Rachel Leclerc, Rabatteurs d'étoiles
- 1996 - Hélène Dorion, Sans bord, sans bout du monde
- 1997 - Claude Beausoleil, Grand hôtel des étrangers
- 1998 - Paul Chanel Malenfant, Fleuves
- 1999 - Hugues Corriveau, Le Livre du frère
- 2000 - Normand de Bellefeuille, La Marche de l'aveugle sans son chien
- 2001 - Martine Audet, Les tables
- 2002 - Michel Beaulieu, Trivialités
- 2003 - Danielle Fournier, Poèmes perdus en Hongrie
- 2004 - Jean-Philippe Bergeron, Visages de l'affolement
- 2005 - Robert Melançon, Le Paradis des apparences
- 2006 - Fernand Ouellette, L'Inoubliable
- 2007 - François Charron, Ce qui nous abandonne
- 2008 - Nathalie Stephens, ...s'arrête? Je
- 2009 - Monique Deland, Miniatures, balles perdues et autres désordres
- 2010 - Paul Bélanger, Répit
- 2011 - Carole David, Manuel de poétique à l'intention des jeunes filles
- 2012 - Antoine Boisclair, Le bruissement des possibles
- 2013 - René Lapierre, Pour les désespérés seulement
- 2014 - Michaël Trahan, Nœud coulant
- 2015 - André Roy, La très grande solitude de l'écrivain pragois Franz Kafka
- 2016 - Rosalie Lessard, L'observatoire
- 2017 - Marie-Célie Agnant, Femmes des terres brûlées
- 2018 - Catherine Lalonde, La dévoration des fées
- 2019 - Catherine Harton, Les ordres de la nuit
- 2020 - Jean-Marc Desgent, Misère et dialogue des bêtes
