= 1986 Governor General's Awards =

Canadian literary award

Each winner of the 1986 Governor General's Awards for Literary Merit was selected by a panel of judges administered by the Canada Council for the Arts.

The four Canada Council Children's Literature Prizes, two each for children's book writers and illustrators, were outside the Governor General's Awards program for the last time. For Children's Literature Prize winners 1975 to 1986, see "Children's literature" (2) and "Children's illustration" (2) in the footer navigation box.

Two awards for literary translation were also included, bringing the number of Governor General's Awards for Literary Merit from 8 in 1986 to 14 in 1987.

== English ==
Category	Winner	Nominated
Fiction	Alice Munro, The Progress of Love	Lois Braun, A Stone Watermelon; John Metcalf, Adult Entertainment; Aritha van Herk, No Fixed Address
Non-fiction	Northrop Frye, Northrop Frye on Shakespeare	Claude Bissell, The Imperial Canadian; Phyllis Grosskurth, Melanie Klein; Witold Rybczynski, Home
Poetry	Al Purdy, The Collected Poems of Al Purdy	Christopher Dewdney, The Immaculate Perception; John Newlove, The Night the Dog Smiled
Drama	Sharon Pollock, Doc	Frank Moher, Odd Jobs; Allan Stratton, Papers

== French ==
Category	Winner	Nominated
Fiction	Yvon Rivard, Les silences du corbeau	Pierre Nepveu, L'hiver de Mira Christophe; Sylvain Trudel, Le souffle de l'Harmattan
Non-fiction	Régine Robin, Le réalisme socialiste: une esthétique impossible	Marcel Fournier, L'entrée dans la modernité: science, culture et société au Québec; René Major, De l'élection: Freud face aux idéologies américaine, allemande et soviétique
Poetry	Cécile Cloutier, L'écouté	François Charron, La chambre des miracles; Normand de Bellefeuille, Catégoriques, un deux et trois; Louise Dupré, Chambres
Drama	Anne Legault, La visite des sauvages	Normand Chaurette, Fragments d'une lettre d'adieu lus par des géologues; Yves Desgagnés and Louise Roy, Les nouilles; Jean-Pierre Ronfard, Le Titanic
