= Jean Royer (writer) =

French Canadian writer and poet (1938–2019)

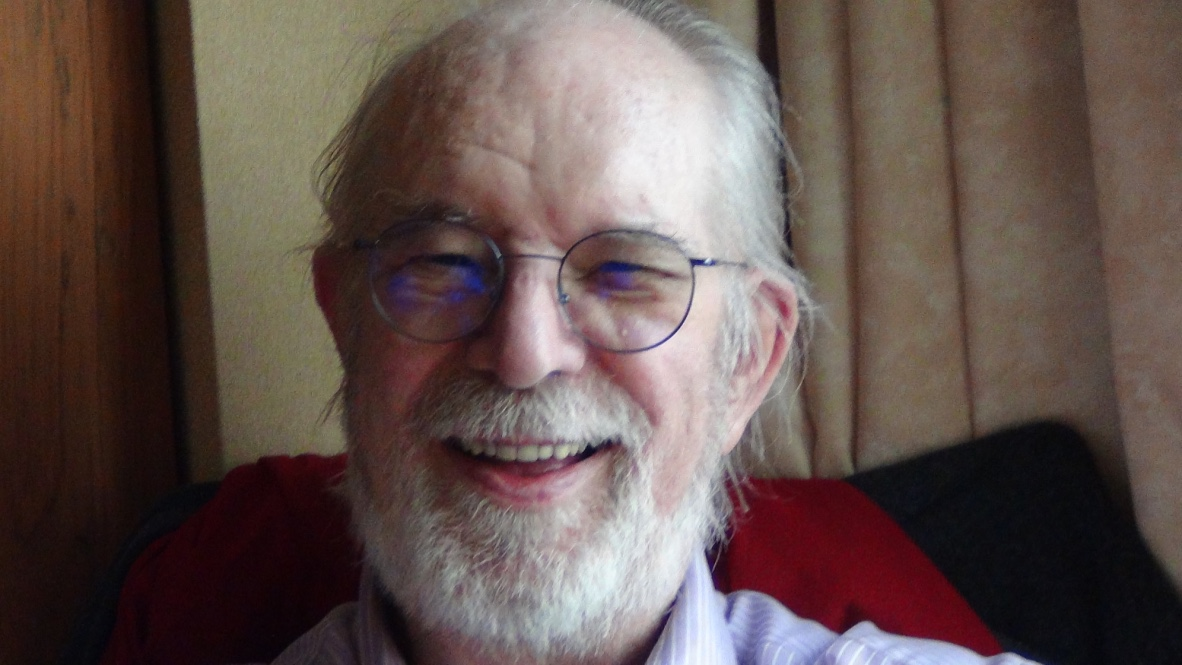
- Born: 26 June 1938; Saint-Charles-de-Bellechasse, Quebec, Canada
- Died: 4 July 2019 (aged 81); Montreal, Quebec, Canada
- Occupation: Writer

Jean Royer (26 June 1938 – 4 July 2019) was a French Canadian writer and poet.

== Biography ==
Royer was a literary critic for the daily newspaper Le Devoir from 1971 to 1982. He was President of Académie des lettres du Québec from 1998 to 2004.

Royer's writings are kept in the archives of The National Library and Archives of Quebec.

In 1989, he was awarded Prix Alain-Grandbois, and in 2014, he received the Prix Athanase-David.
