= Jean-Philippe Bergeron =

Jean-Philippe Bergeron may refer to:

- Jean-Philippe Bergeron (writer) (born 1978), Canadian writer and poet
- Jean-Philippe Bergeron (racing driver) (born 1999), Canadian stock car racing driver
