= Rodney Saint-Éloi =

Haitian-Canadian poet

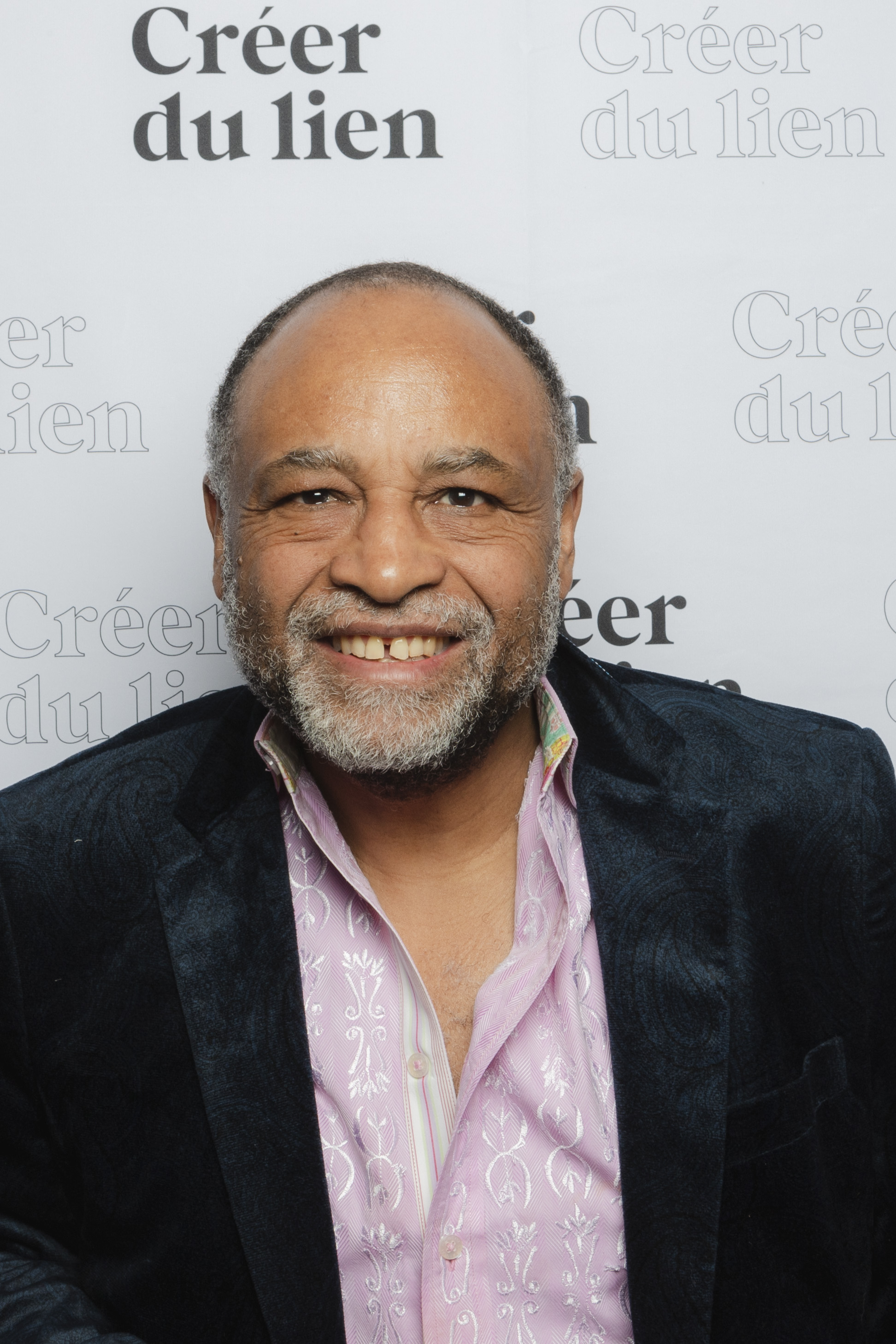
- Born: Cavaellon, Haiti
- Occupation: poet
- Writing career
- Period: 2010s-present
- Notable works: Jacques Roche, je t'écris cette lettre, Je suis la fille du baobab brûlé

Rodney Saint-Éloi is a Haitian-Canadian poet. He is a two-time nominee for the Governor General's Award for French-language poetry, at the 2013 Governor General's Awards for Jacques Roche, je t'écris cette lettre and at the 2016 Governor General's Awards for Je suis la fille du baobab brûlé.

Born and raised in Cavaellon, Haiti, he moved to Montreal in 2001. He was a founder of the Haitian publishing company Éditions Mémoire in 1991, and has published poetry collections including J'avais une ville d’eau, de terre et d'arc-en-ciel heureux (1999), J’ai un arbre dans ma pirogue (2003) and Récitatif au pays des ombres (2011).
