= Michel van Schendel =

Canadian poet and writer

Michel van Schendel (June 16, 1929 - October 9, 2005) was a French-born Canadian writer and journalist from Quebec.

Born in Asnières-sur-Seine, France in 1929 to Belgian parents, van Schendel emigrated to Quebec in 1952. He worked as a journalist for the Société Radio-Canada for several years before joining the Université du Québec à Montréal as a professor in 1969, holding that position until his retirement in 1998.

He published his first poetry collection, Poèmes de l'Amérique étrangère, in 1958. He published work only intermittently for many years thereafter, with his work increasing in frequency around the late 1970s and early 1980s. He won the Governor General's Award for French-language poetry or drama at the 1980 Governor General's Awards for De l'oeil et de l'écoute, but donated his prize money to striking Canadian Broadcasting Corporation employees and the Salvadoran Solidarity Committee. He was later nominated in the French-language poetry category at the 1998 Governor General's Awards for Bitumes.

In 2003 he won the Prix Athanase-David from the government of Quebec for his body of work, and the Prix Victor-Barbeau for his non-fiction work Un temps éventuel.

He died of cancer in October 2005.

== Works ==
=== Non-fiction ===
- La Poésie et nous (1958), in collaboration with Gilles Hénault, Jacques Brault, Wilfrid Lemoine and Yves Préfontaine
- Ducharme l'inquiétant (1967)
- Rebonds critiques (1992)
- Jousse ou la traversée de l'Amérique (1996)
- Un temps éventuel (2002)
- L'Œil allumé (2004)
- Écrits politiques (2007)

=== Poetry ===
- Poèmes de l'Amérique étrangère (1958)
- Variations sur la pierre (1964)
- La Têt con navet (1977)
- Veiller ne plus veiller (1978)
- De l'œil et de l'écoute (1980)
- Autres, autrement (1983)
- Sédiments 86 (1986), in collaboration with Georges Leroux
- L'Impression du souci (1993)
- Bitumes (1998)
- Quand demeure (2002)
- Poèmes de flèche et de plume (2004)
- Choses nues passage (2004)
- Mille pas dans le jardin font aussi le tour du monde (2005)
- L'Oiseau, le Vieux-Port et le Charpentier (2006)
- Il dit (2008), publication posthume

=== Art books ===
Collaborations with artist Louis-Pierre Bougie:

- Terre brune (2004)
- Le jardinier (2005)
- Les mots griffonnés (2011)
