= René Lapierre =

Québécois writer and teacher

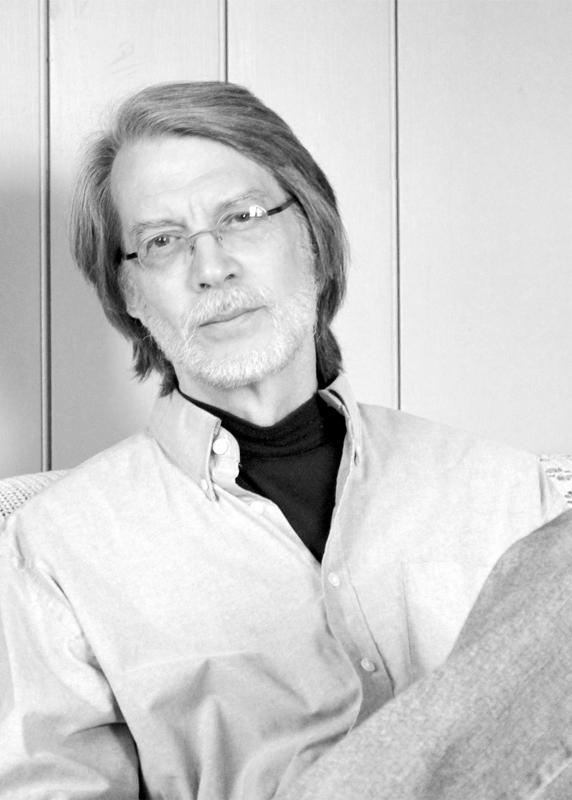
- Born: 1953 (age 72–73)
- Occupation: professor
- Writing career
- Language: French
- Genres: Poetry, essays

René Lapierre (born 1953) is a Québécois writer and teacher. Mainly a poet and essayist, he has published over the last 30 years more than twenty books, among which are several essays on writing and theories of creation, social criticism, and cultural spectacularization. He also published in magazines, in collective works or in social networks a lot of commitment texts, particularly in the context of 2012 Quebec student protests.

Since 1981, he has taught literature (literary creation, theory of forms, ethics, aesthetics, and theories of creation) in the Literary Studies Department at the University of Quebec in Montreal, where he had the opportunity to work with many prominent poets of Quebec.

== Honors ==
- 2002 : Prix Victor-Barbeau de l'Académie des lettres du Québec
- 2012 : Prix de poésie Estuaire - Bistro Leméac pour Pour les désespérés seulement
- 2013 : Prix Alain-Grandbois de l'Académie des lettres du Québec · pour Pour les désespérés seulement
- 2013 : Prix du Gouverneur général : poésie de langue française · pour Pour les désespérés seulement

== Bibliography ==
- Les masques du récit. Lecture de Prochain épisode de Hubert Aquin, Hurtubise HMH, coll. "Littérature", 1980, essai ISBN 2-89045-446-0
- L'imaginaire captif : Hubert Aquin, Les Quinze, coll. "Prose exacte", 1981, essai ISBN 2-89026-263-4
  - Réédition: L'imaginaire captif : Hubert Aquin, L'Hexagone, coll. "TYPO", 1992, essai ISBN 2-89295-062-7
- Comme des mannequins, Primeur L'Échiquier, 1983, roman ISBN 2-89286-003-2
- Profil de l'ombre, Les Écrits des Forges, 1983, poésie ISBN 2-89046-054-1
- L'été Rébecca, Éditions du Seuil, 1985, roman ISBN 2-02-008923-8
- Une encre sépia, L'Hexagone, 1990, poésie ISBN 2-89006-411-5
- Effacement, L'Hexagone, 1991, poetry ISBN 2-89006-429-8
- Là-bas c'est déjà demain, Herbes rouges, 1994, poésie ISBN 2-89419-045-X
- Écrire l'Amérique, Herbes rouges, 1995, essay ISBN 2-89419-070-0
- Fais-moi mal Sarah, Herbes rouges, 1996, poésie ISBN 2-89419-087-5
- Viendras-tu avec moi, Herbes rouges, 1996, poésie ISBN 2-89419-082-4
- Love and Sorrow, Herbes rouges, 1998, poésie ISBN 2-89419-132-4
- L'entretien du désespoir. Essai sur l'affolement, Herbes rouges, 2001, essai ISBN 2-89419-179-0
- Piano, Herbes rouges, 2001, poetry ISBN 2-89419-191-X
- Figures de l'abandon, Herbes rouges, 2002, essai ISBN 2-89419-205-3
- L'Atelier vide, Herbes rouges, 2003, essai ISBN 2-89419-219-3
- L'Eau de Kiev, Herbes rouges, 2006, poésie ISBN 2-89419-250-9
- Traité de physique, Herbes rouges, 2008, poésie ISBN 978-2-89419-280-1
- Aimée soit la honte, Herbes rouges, 2010, poésie ISBN 978-2-89419-305-1
- Renversements. L'écriture-voix, Herbes rouges, 2011, essai ISBN 978-2-89419-318-1
- Pour les désespérés seulement, Herbes rouges, 2012, poésie ISBN 978-2-89419-338-9 Prix Alain-Grandbois 2013. Prix du Gouverneur général : poésie de langue française 2013.
