= Daria Colonna =

Canadian poet

- Born: May 12, 1989 (age 36) Montreal, Quebec, Canada
- Occupation: Poet
- Years active: 2015–present

Daria Colonna (born May 12, 1989) is a Canadian poet from Montreal, Quebec. She is a two-time Governor General's Literary Award nominee for French-language poetry, receiving nods at the 2018 Governor General's Awards for Ne faites pas honte à votre siècle and at the 2021 Governor General's Awards for La Voleuse.
