= Prix Athanase-David =

Quebec literary award

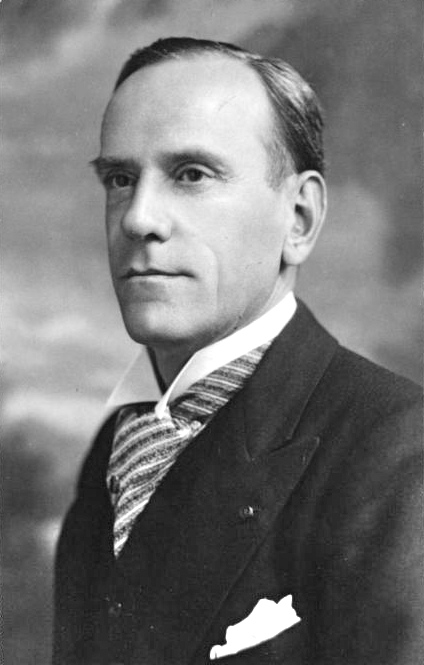
Athanase David, 1940

The Prix Athanase-David is a literary award presented annually by the government of Quebec as part of the Prix du Québec to a Quebec writer, to honour the body of his or her work.

The prize, named in honour of longtime MNA Athanase David, has a monetary value of C$30,000.

Between 1969 and 1972, the award was presented at the beginning of the year for that same calendar year. In 1973, the award date was changed to the end of the year. Paul-Marie Lapointe won the "Prix David 1972" on February 29, 1972; Hubert Aquin was awarded the "Prix David 1972" on January 30, 1973; and Marcel Dubé won the "Prix David 1973" on November 28, 1973.

== Winners ==
- 1969 - Félix-Antoine Savard
- 1970 - Alain Grandbois
- 1971 - Gabrielle Roy
- 1972 - Paul-Marie Lapointe
- 1972/73 - Hubert Aquin
- 1973 - Marcel Dubé
- 1974 - Rina Lasnier
- 1975 - Fernand Dumont
- 1976 - Pierre Vadeboncoeur
- 1977 - Jacques Ferron
- 1978 - Anne Hébert
- 1979 - Yves Thériault
- 1980 - Gérard Bessette
- 1981 - Gilles Archambault
- 1982 - Marie-Claire Blais
- 1983 - Gaston Miron
- 1984 - Jean-Guy Pilon
- 1985 - Jacques Godbout
- 1986 - Jacques Brault
- 1987 - Fernand Ouellette
- 1988 - Michel Tremblay
- 1989 - Jean Éthier-Blais
- 1990 - Andrée Maillet
- 1991 - Nicole Brossard
- 1992 - André Major
- 1993 - Gilles Hénault
- 1994 - Réjean Ducharme
- 1995 - Jacques Poulin
- 1996 - Monique Bosco
- 1997 - Gilles Marcotte
- 1998 - André Langevin
- 1999 - Roland Giguère
- 2000 - Pierre Morency
- 2001 - Victor-Lévy Beaulieu
- 2002 - Madeleine Gagnon
- 2003 - Michel van Schendel
- 2004 - Naïm Kattan
- 2005 - Pierre Nepveu
- 2006 - Mavis Gallant
- 2007 - Paul Chamberland
- 2008 - Suzanne Jacob
- 2009 - Denise Desautels
- 2010 - Suzanne Lebeau
- 2011 - Joël Des Rosiers
- 2012 - France Théoret
- 2013 - Roger Des Roches
- 2014 - Jean Royer
- 2015 - Pierre Ouellet
- 2016 - Claude Jasmin
- 2017 - Normand de Bellefeuille
- 2018 - François Ricard
- 2019 - Hélène Dorion
- 2020 - Carole David
- 2021 - Michel Marc Bouchard
- 2022 - Michel Rabagliati
- 2023 - Robert Lalonde
- 2024 - Élise Turcotte
- 2025 - Yvon Rivard
