= Michaël Trahan =

Canadian poet from Quebec (born 1984)

Michaël Trahan (born 1984) is a Canadian poet from Quebec.

Born and raised in Acton Vale, he moved to Montreal in the early 2000s. His first book of poetry, Nœud coulant, won the Prix Émile-Nelligan, the Prix Alain-Grandbois and the Prix du Festival de la poésie de Montréal in 2014. His second book, La raison des fleurs, won the Governor General's Award for French-language poetry at the 2018 Governor General's Awards.

He is also the author of La postérité du scandale : Petite histoire de la réception de Sade (1909-1939), a non-fiction study of the writings of the Marquis de Sade.
