= Lois Braun =

Canadian writer

- Born: Beverly Helen Lois Nickel; 1949 (age 76–77); Rosenfeld, Manitoba, Canada
- Occupation: short story writer
- Writing career
- Period: 1980s–present
- Notable work: A Stone Watermelon

Lois Braun (born 1949) is a Canadian writer. She was shortlisted for the Governor General's Award for English-language fiction at the 1986 Governor General's Awards for her debut short story collection A Stone Watermelon published by Turnstone Press.

Braun was born in Rosenfeld, Manitoba. Educated at the University of Winnipeg and the University of Manitoba, she worked as a school teacher in Altona until her retirement in 2003. She published three further collections of short stories, and won the Margaret Laurence Award from the Manitoba Book Awards in 2008 for The Penance Drummer.

== Works ==
- A Stone Watermelon (1986, ISBN 978-0888011077)
- The Pumpkin-Eaters (1990, ISBN 978-0888011480)
- The Montreal Cats (1995, ISBN 978-0888011992)
- The Penance Drummer (2007, ISBN 978-0888013279)
- Peculiar Lessons (2020, ISBN 978-1773370378)
