= Monique Bosco =

Austrian-born Canadian journalist and writer

Monique Bosco (June 8, 1927 – May 17, 2007) was an Austrian-born Canadian journalist and writer.

== Background ==
She was born in Vienna into an Austrian-Jewish family and moved to France where she lived until 1931. In 1940, Bosco spent a year In Saint-Brieuc, then took refuge in Marseilles, where she hid and ceased going to school. In 1948, she emigrated to Montreal to join her father. There, she resumed her studies. Bosco enrolled at the University of Montreal in the Faculty of Arts and received her Masters in 1951 and her PhD in 1953. In 1961, she published An Unsteady Love, her first novel, and a year later she was appointed Professor of French Literature and Creative Writing at the University of Montreal. Bosco is considered one of the pioneers of modern Québécois studies.

She worked for Radio Canada International from 1949 to 1952, as a researcher for the National Film Board of Canada from 1960 to 1962 and as a columnist for La Presse, Le Devoir and Maclean's.

== Notable works ==
Bosco's work is described as singular, intense, and full of characters who carry the weight of their lives. Several of her works transpose classic figures from Greek tragedy into a contemporary Quebec context (such as New Medea, 1974; and Portrait de Zeus peint par Minerve, 1982).

Themes of solitude and incommunication are prevalent and Monique Bosco systematically presented, in works that combined prose and poetry, the "divided beings of the world" - according to the expression of essayist Paulette Collet - suffering from painful feelings of isolation, rejection, rebellion and guilt.

=== Themes ===
Bosco's novels share similar themes—de/racination, the alienated female body, solitude and bitterness—but increase in their intensity of lamentation and rage from the lyrical Un amour maladroit (1961) and Les infusoires(1965) to La femme de Loth (1970). This novel is a strong and bitter jeremiad, the lament of a rejected woman who has not yet broken through her fascination with a man-god. New Medea (1974) takes this rage to an even higher pitch, not quite succeeding in making convincing either Medea or her enormous act, but inspiring respect for the strength of her obsession. Charles Lévy M.D. (1977), despite the banality of its title and the familiarity of the situation it depicts (it is the monologue of a dying man), is a compassionate and subtle work, the confession of a weak man who is bound to his wife and convention through some fundamental lack of energy.

The following novels, Portrait de Zeus peinte par Minerve (1982) and Sara Sage (1986), make use of tragic classical and biblical myths, but are more developed structurally and linguistically. In Portrait de Zeus the poetic-prose style of recurrent waves of words and phrases combines with mixing of mythological and historical figures, literatures, and modern references to create a demystification of patriarchal values. Sara Sage takes on the biblical story of Sarah, casts it in France during the Second World War, and presents it from a first-person perspective in a lyrical, biblical style that expresses profound rage at male-dominant gender values.

Bosco turned to the short-story form in the late 1980s and 1990s. She published a few highly thematic collections: Boomerang (1987), Clichés (1988), Remémoration (1991), and Éphémères (1993). As well, Bosco published the novel Le jeu des sept familles (1995). The stories are atmospheric and often present highly interiorized but engaging characters. In Éphémères the characters are more static. Le jeu de sept familles depicts the condensed fluidity of its characters' perspectives during a family reunion—half of them are bourgeois Québécois and the others are working-class Italo-Canadians.

=== Bibliography ===
poetry:

- Jéricho (1971)
- Miserere 77-90 (1991)
- Lamento 90-97 (1997)
- Confiteor (1998)

short stories:

- Boomerang (1987)
- Clichés (1988)
- Remémoration (1991)
- Éphémères (1993)

and novels:

- Un amour maladroit (1961)
- Les infusoires (1965)
- New Medea (1974)
- Charles Levy (1977)
- Schabbat 70-77 (1978)
- Portrait de Zeus peint par Minerve (1982)
- Sara Sage (1986)
- Le jeu des sept familles (1995)
- Eh bien! la guerre. 2005

== Awards ==
Monique Bosco was awarded the American First Novel Award in 1961 for her first novel Un amour maladroit . She received the Governor General's Award for French-language fiction in 1970 for her novel La femme de Loth., and received the Alain-Grandbois Poetry Prize for her work Miserere.

Bosco was awarded the Prix Athanase-David in 1996 and received the Prix Alain-Grandbois for her poetry in 1992.

She died in Montreal at the age of 79.
