= Michel Beaulieu =

Canadian poet and writer (1941–1985)

- Born: 31 October 1941
- Died: 10 July 1985 (aged 43)
- Burial place: Notre Dame des Neiges Cemetery
- Education: Collège Jean-de-Brébeuf; Université de Montréal
- Occupation: Writer

Michel Beaulieu (31 October 1941, Montréal - 10 July 1985) was a Quebec writer.

== Life ==
He graduated from Collège Jean-de-Brébeuf and then Université de Montréal.

His archive is held at Bibliothèque et Archives nationales du Québec.

After his death in 1985, he was entombed at the Notre Dame des Neiges Cemetery in Montreal.

== Honors ==
- 1973 : Prix de la revue Études françaises (avec Variables)
- 1980 : Prix littéraires du Journal de Montréal (avec Desseins)
- 1981 : Prix du Gouverneur général : poésie de langue française (avec Visages)
- 1985 : Grand Prix du Festival international de la poésie (avec Kaléidoscope)
- 2002 : Prix Alain-Grandbois

== Works ==
- Charmes de la fureur Translated by Arlette Francière, Exile Editions, 1984, ISBN 9780920428771
- Charmes de la Fureur. Exile Editions, Ltd. 2003. pp. 1–. ISBN 978-1-55096-565-0.
- Kaleidoscope: Perils of a Solemn Body. Translated by Arlette Francière. Exile Editions, Ltd. 1 March 1989. ISBN 978-0-920428-04-7.
- Countenances. Translated by Josée Michaud. Exile Editions, Ltd. 1 January 1986. ISBN 978-0-920428-03-0.

Beaulieu published over twenty books during his short career. His work is characterized by its formal precision and linguistic innovation.

=== Poetry ===
- Pour chanter dans les chaînes, Montréal: Éditions d'Orphée, 1964.
- Variables, Montréal: Presses de l'Université de Montréal, 1973. (Winner of the Prix de la revue Études françaises)
- L'Envers du corps, Montréal: l'Hexagone, 1977.
- Desseins, Montréal: l'Hexagone, 1980.
- Visages, Montréal: le Noroît, 1981. (Winner of the Governor General's Award)
- Kaléidoscope ou les Périls du corps solennel, Montréal: le Noroît, 1984.

=== Translations into English ===
- Charmes de la fureur. Translated by Arlette Francière, Exile Editions, 1984. ISBN 9780920428771
- Countenances (Translation of Visages). Translated by Josée Michaud, Exile Editions, 1986. ISBN 9780920428030
- Kaleidoscope: Perils of a Solemn Body. Translated by Arlette Francière, Exile Editions, 1989. ISBN 9780920428047

=== Translations by Beaulieu ===
Beaulieu was also a prolific translator of English-Canadian literature into French, including works by:

- Leonard Cohen (Death of a Lady's Man as Mort d'un séducteur, 1980).
- Michael Ondaatje.

== Literary Style and Legacy ==
Michel Beaulieu is often described as a "poet's poet" and was a pivotal figure in the transition of Quebec poetry from the nationalist themes of the 1960s to a more personal, fragmented, and modern aesthetic. His involvement in publishing—founding the publishing house Éditions Estérel and serving as an editor for Éditions du Jour—allowed him to influence a generation of writers.

His style is noted for its economy of words, rhythmic complexity, and an obsession with the mechanics of memory and the human body.

== Honors ==
- 1973: Prix de la revue Études françaises (for Variables)
- 1980: Prix littéraires du Journal de Montréal (for Desseins)
- 1981: Governor General's Award for French-language poetry (for Visages)
- 1985: Grand Prix du Festival international de la poésie (for Kaléidoscope)
- 2002: Prix Alain-Grandbois (Posthumous recognition for his body of work)
