= Danielle Fournier =

Canadian educator and writer (born 1955)

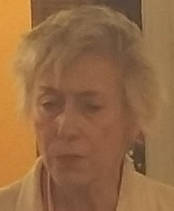
Danielle Fournier

Danielle Fournier (born 1955) is a Quebec educator and writer.

She was born in Montreal and received a PhD in literature from the Université de Sherbrooke. She also studied German at the University of New Brunswick. She has taught at the college and university level at various institutions including the Université de Sherbrooke, the University of New Brunswick, at McGill University, the Université du Québec à Montréal, at Concordia University and at the Collège Jean-de-Brébeuf, where she held a permanent position.

Fournier has written poetry, fiction and critical essays for various magazines such as Exit, Arcade, Estuaire, Moebius, Spirale, Urgences, Québec français and Voix et Images. Her work has also appeared in a number of anthologies. In 2003, she was awarded the Prix Alain-Grandbois for her poetry collection Poèmes perdus en Hongrie. In 2005, Il n'y a rien d'intact dans ma chair was a finalist for the Governor General's Award for French-language poetry and, in 2010, her collection effleurés de lumière won that award.

== Selected works ==
- Langue éternelle, poetry (1998)
- Poèmes perdus en Hongrie, poetry (2002)
- Le chant unifié, novel (2005)
