= Louise Dupré =

Quebec poet and novelist

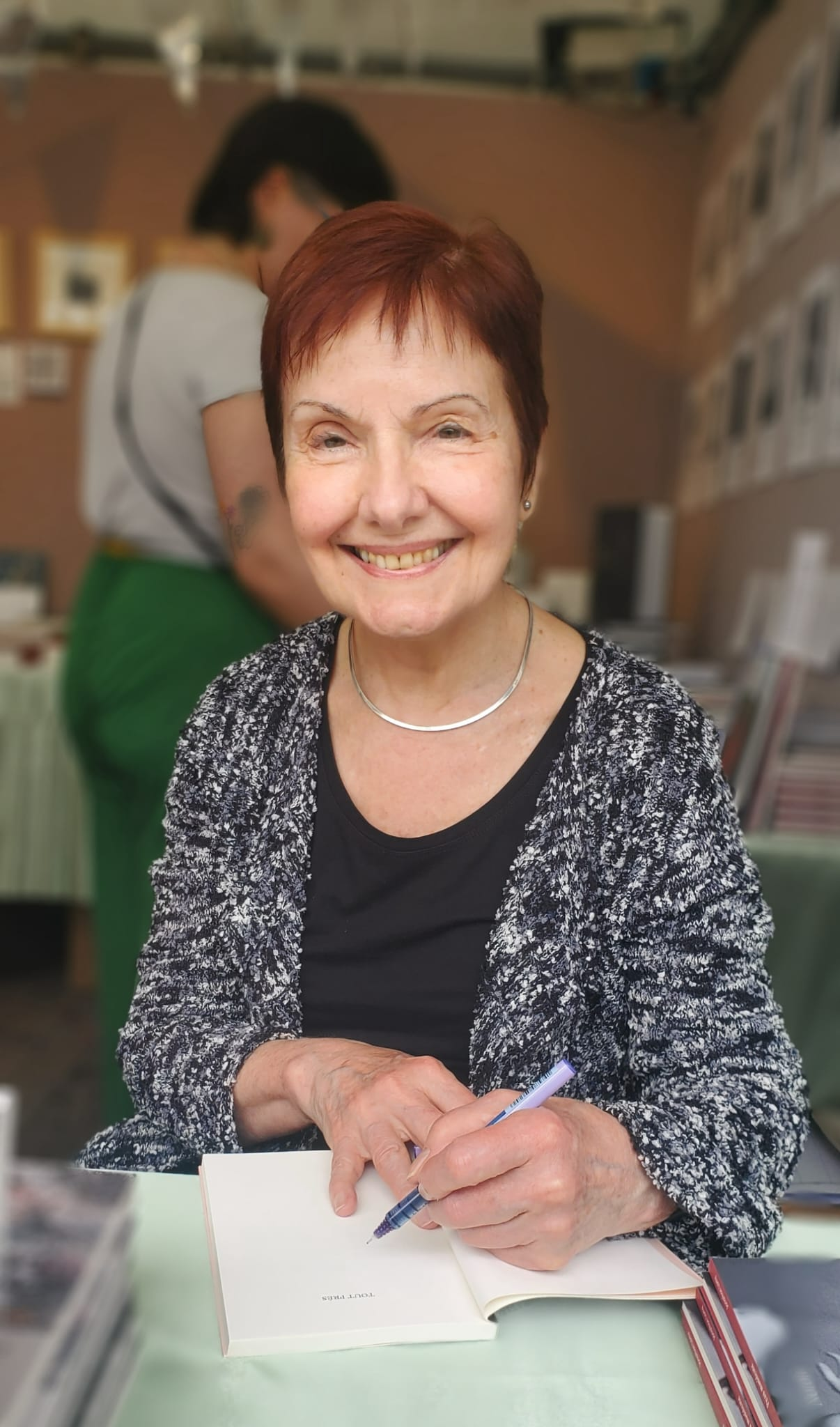
- Louise Dupré signing the new edition of her poetry collection Tout près (Paris, 2024)
- Born: 9 July 1949 (age 77); Sherbrooke, Quebec, Canada
- Writing career
- Genres: Poetry, novels, plays, essays
- Notable awards: Prix Ringuet (1993), Governor's General Award (2011 and 2017)

Louise Dupré (born July 9, 1949) is a Quebec poet and novelist.

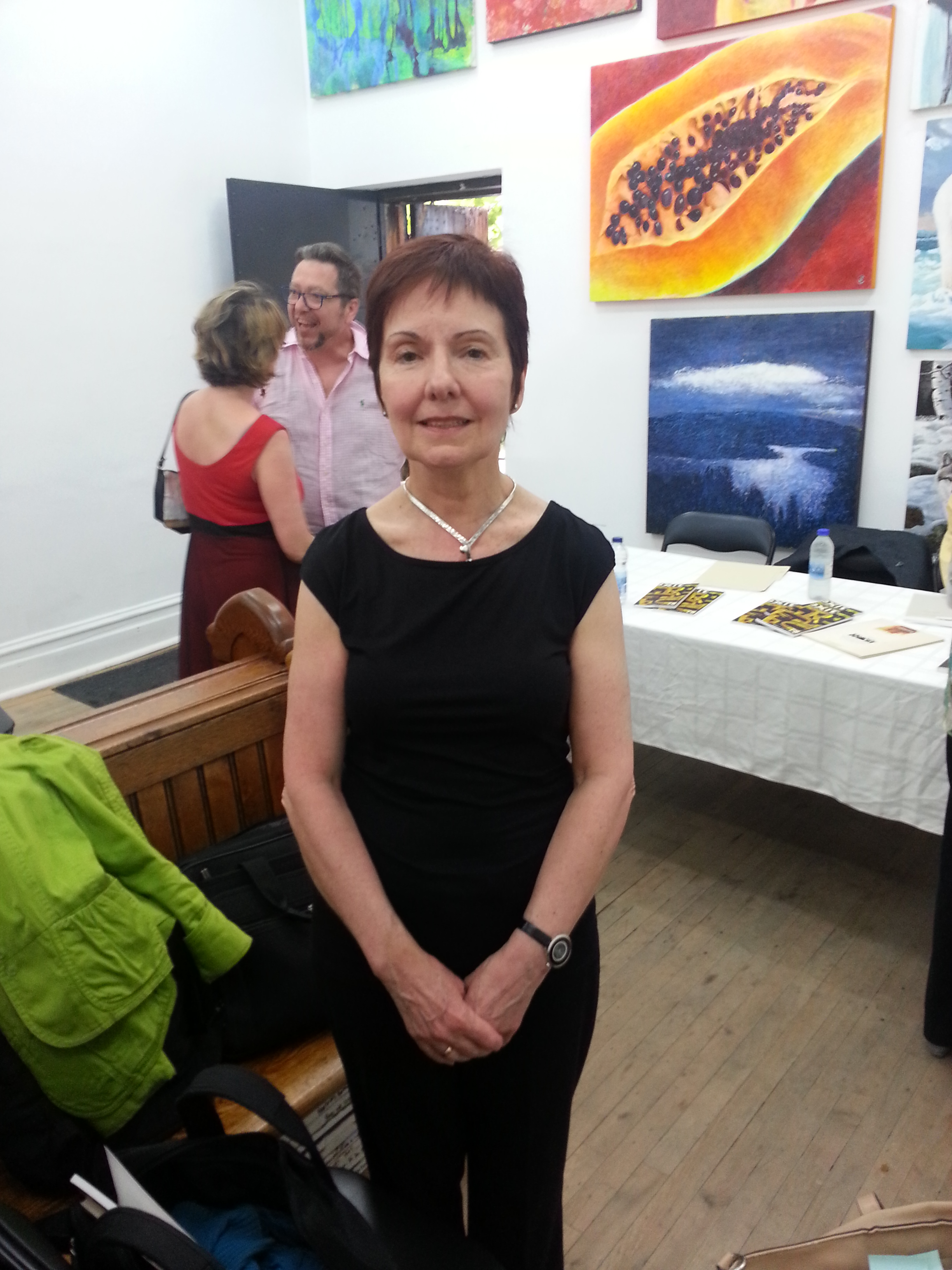
Louise Dupré in Montreal in 2016

The daughter of Cécile Paré and Arthur Dupré, she was born in Sherbrooke and was educated at the Université de Sherbrooke and the Université de Montréal, receiving a PhD in literature from the latter institution. From 1981 to 1984, she was a member of the publishing collective Éditions du Remue-Ménage. In 1988, she became a member of the editorial committee for the magazine Voix et Images : Littérature québécoise; she served as director from 1995 to 1998. She taught at the Université du Québec à Montréal.

Her poetry collection La Peau familière (1983) received the Prix Alfred-DesRochers. In 1999, she was admitted to the Académie des lettres du Québec and, in 2002, to the Royal Society of Canada.

== Selected works ==
=== Poetry ===
- Noir déjà, poetry (1993), received the Grand Prix de poésie from the Festival international de Trois-Rivières
- Tout près, Éditions du Noroît, Saint-Hippolyte, 1998, 93 p. (ISBN 978-2-89018-403-9) New ed. 2021.
- Tout comme elle, play (2006), received the Critics' prize for 2005–2006 in the category Montreal from the Association québécoise des critiques de théâtre
- Plus haut que les flammes (2011), received the Governor General's Award for French-language poetry and the Grand Prix Québécor from the Festival international de la poésie
- La Main hantée (2017) won the Governor General's Award for French-language poetry
- Exercices de joie, Éditions du Noroît, Montréal, 2022, 144 p. (ISBN 978-2-89766-370-4, 978-2-89766-371-1)
- Bleu cendres (ill. Armelle Mourier), L'Atelier des Noyers, coll. « Carnets de Couleurs A5 », Perrigny-lès-Dijon, 2024, 40 p. (ISBN 978-2-494676-20-6)

=== Fiction ===
- La Memoria, novel (1997), received the Prix Ringuet from the Académie des lettres du Québec and the prize awarded by the Société des écrivains Canadiens
- La Voie lactée, Éditions XYZ, Montréal, 2001, 211 p. (ISBN 978-2-89406-313-2)
