= Hélène Monette =

Hélène Monette (June 11, 1960 – June 25, 2015) was a Quebec writer of poetry.

The youngest daughter of André Monette and Rita Roquebrune, she was born in Saint-Philippe-de-Laprairie and was educated at the Cégep de Saint-Hyacinthe, at the Université du Québec à Montréal and Concordia University. Monette was co-founder of the magazine Ciel variable, later CV Photo. She has performed her poems on stage accompanied by musicians and appeared in festivals in Quebec, France, Mexico and Portugal. She has also taken part in recorded poetry such as La vache enragée directed by Mitsiko Miller and Wired on words-Millenium Cabaret directed by Ian Ferrier. She has read poetry on Radio Canada and performed in the films Seul dans mon putain d'univers and Les Mots dits. Her poems have appeared in the literary magazines Moebius, Arcade and Le Sabord.

Her poetry collection Lettres insolites (1991) was nominated for the Prix Émile-Nelligan.

== Selected works ==
- Montréal brûle-t-elle?, poetry (1987)
- Crimes et Chatouillements, collected stories (1992)
- Le goudron et les plumes, novel (1993), received the Grand Prix du livre de Montréal
- Kyrie eleison, poetry (1994)
- Plaisirs et paysages kitsch, stories and poems (1997), nominated for a Governor General's Literary Award
- Le blanc des yeux, poetry (1999)
- Le jardin de la nuit, stories and poems (2001)
- Thérèse pour joie et orchestre (2009), received the Governor General's Award for French-language poetry
