= Madeleine Gagnon =

Canadian educator, literary critic and writer (1938–2026)

Madeleine Gagnon (July 27, 1938 – April 30, 2026) was a Canadian educator, literary critic and writer.

== Life and career ==
Gagnon was born in Amqui in the valley of the Matapedia River and was educated at the Collège Notre-Dame d'Acadie in Moncton, at the Université de Montréal and the Université d'Aix-en-Provence. From 1969 to 1982, she taught literature at the Université du Québec à Montréal. She later served as a visiting professor and writer-in-residence at the Université de Montréal, at the Université de Sherbrooke, at the Université du Québec à Montréal and at the Université du Québec à Rimouski.

She wrote for the magazines Chroniques (which she founded with Patrick Straram), Liberté, La Nouvelle Barre du jour, Possibles, Osiris, Estuaire, Urgences, Passages, and Actuels. In 1986, her book Les Fleurs du Catalpa received the Grand Prix de poésie from the Journal de Montréal, Her poetry collection Chant pour un Québec lointain received the Governor General's Award for French-language poetry, the Prix Arthur-Buies from the Salon du livre de Rimouski and the Prix Artquimédia from the town of Amqui. In 2002, she was awarded the Prix Athanase-David. Gagnon was named a member of the Académie des lettres du Québec in 1987.

Gagnon died on April 30, 2026, at the age of 87.

== Selected works ==
- La venue à l'écriture, feminist essays (1976) with Hélène Cixous and Annie Leclerc
- La terre est remplie de langage, poetry (1993)
- Le Deuil du soleil, autobiographical novel (1998), nominated for Governor General's Award for French-language fiction
- Rêve de pierre, poetry (1999)
- Les femmes et la guerre, essay (2001), received the Prix Marcel-Couture
- Le chant de la terre, poetry anthology covering the period 1978–2002 (2002)
