= Pamela Gillilan =

English poet

Pamela Gillilan (1918-2001) was an English poet.

== Life ==
Pamela Gillilan was born on 24 November 1918 in Finchley in North London. Her parents were teachers. After school, she joined the civil service, and as a young woman, wrote some poetry and fiction. During the Second World War, she was a meteorologist with the Women's Auxiliary Air Force for RAF Bomber Command in Yorkshire. In 1948, she married David Gillilan. The couple moved to Cornwall, buying and restoring Kilmar House, a derelict Grade II listed house in Liskeard, in 1956. They ran an interior design and furniture restoration business there for many years.

David Gillilan died in 1974. Having written nothing for twenty-five years, Pamela Gillilan now returned to writing poetry. In 1979, her poem "Come Away", an elegy on the death of her husband, won the Cheltenham Festival poetry competition. She was a Poetry Society prize-winner in 1980 and 1981. That Winter (1986), collecting elegies to her husband, was shortlisted for the Commonwealth Poetry Prize.

She moved to Bristol, and taught creative writing at Bristol University and the University of the Third Age. She died on 26 October 2001.

== Works ==
- Minima. Helston: Menhir, 1982.
- That winter. Newcastle upon Tyne: Bloodaxe, 1986.
- The turnspit dog: poems. Newcastle upon Tyne: Bloodaxe Books, 1993. Woodcuts by Charlotte Cory.
- All-steel traveller: new & selected poems. Newcastle upon Tyne: Bloodaxe Books, 1994
- The Rashomon syndrome, Newcastle upon Tyne: Bloodaxe Books, 1998
