= Carole David =

Canadian poet and novelist (born 1955)

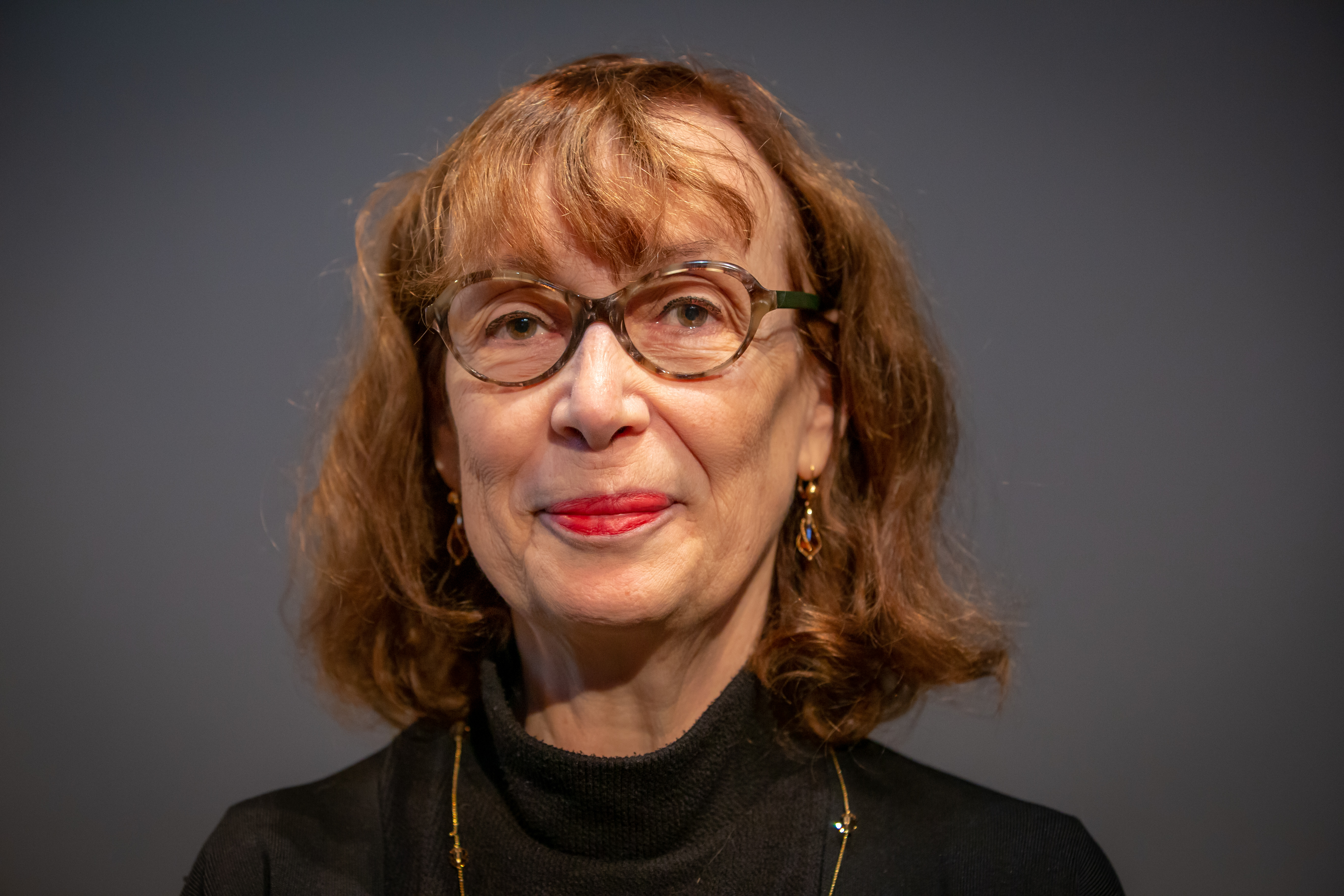
- Carole David in 2019
- Born: July 25, 1955 (age 70) Montreal, Quebec, Canada
- Occupation: Novelist, poet
- Period: 1980–present

Carole David (born July 25, 1955) is a Quebec poet and novelist.

== Biography ==
The daughter of Clothilde Fioramore and Guy David, she was born in Montreal and earned a PhD in literary studies from the University of Sherbrooke. She was a member of the editorial committee for the magazine Spirale from 1980 to 1982 and for the magazine Estuaire from 1993 to 1996. She also worked as a reader for the publishing house VLB éditeur from 1979 to 1988. David has taught at the Cégep du Vieux Montréal. She was head of the Public Lending Rights Program at the Canada Council for the Arts from 2004 to 2006. In 2006, she was elected president of the Maison de la poésie de Montréal.

David received the Prix Émile-Nelligan for Terroristes d'amour in 1986. In 1996, she was awarded the Terrasses Saint-Sulpice poetry prize by the magazine Estuaire for her poetry collection Abandons. Her novel Impala, published in English and Italian in 1994, was a finalist for the Journal de Montréal prize and for the City of Montreal prize. La Maison d'Ophélie was included on the shortlist for the Governor General's Award for French-language poetry in 1999. She received the Prix Alain-Grandbois in 2011 for her collection Manuel de poétique à l'intention des jeunes filles; the same collection was also included on the shortlist for the Governor General's poetry award.

In 2020 she was named the recipient of Quebec's Prix Athanase-David for lifetime achievement in literature.
