= Pierre Ouellet =

Canadian writer

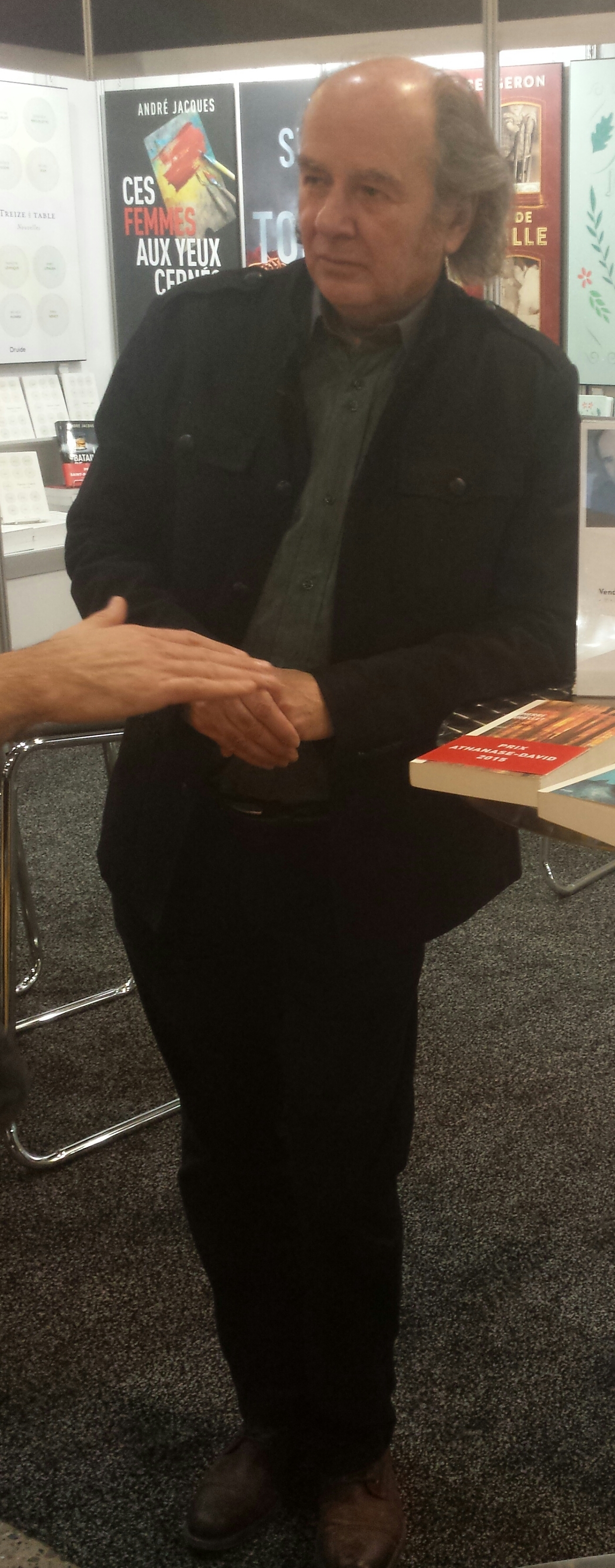
Pierre Ouellet photographed in Montréal, Québec, Canada at the Salon du livre de Montréal 2018.

Pierre Ouellet (French pronunciation: [pjɛʁ wɛlɛt]; born September 2, 1950) is a Québecois writer, critic, and literature professor. He won the Governor General's Literary Award for French non-fiction in 2006 and 2008.

In 2015, he was awarded the Government of Quebec's Prix Athanase-David. In 2004, he was made a Fellow of the Royal Society of Canada.
