= Rachel Leclerc =

Canadian poet and novelist (born 1955)

- Born: July 9, 1955 (age 71); Nouvelle Gaspé Peninsula Canada
- Education: Master's degree
- Alma mater: Université du Québec à Montréal
- Occupations: Poet, novelist
- Writing career
- Language: French
- Period: 1995-present

Rachel Leclerc (born July 9, 1955) is a Quebec poet and novelist.

== Biography ==
Leclerc is the daughter of Rose Aimee Landry and Germain Leclerc. She was born in Nouvelle on Quebec's Gaspé Peninsula.

Leclerc studied in Rimouski and went on to earn a master's degree in creative writing at the Université du Québec à Montréal in 1985. In 1984, she published her first collection of poems Fugues.

== Works ==
Her poetry collection Les vies frontalières, published in 1991, received the Prix Émile-Nelligan and the Prix Jovette-Bernier and was a finalist for the Governor General's Award for French-language poetry in 1994.

Her collection Rabatteurs d'étoiles received the Prix Alain-Grandbois in 1995 and was included on the shortlist for the Governor General's Award for French-language poetry in 1994. Leclerc has also received the Prix littéraires Radio-Canada in 2006 and the Prix du Marché de la Poésie de Montréal in 2008.

She published her first novel Noces de sable in 1995. Her novel Ruelle Océan appeared on the shortlist for the Governor General's Award for French-language fiction in 2001.

Leclerc has also written articles for the literary journal Lettres Québécoises and has worked as an editor for television subtitles.
