= Alain Grandbois =

Canadian Quebecer poet (1900–1975)

- Born: May 25, 1900; Saint-Casimir, Quebec
- Died: March 18, 1975 (aged 74); Quebec City, Quebec
- Writing career
- Genre: poetry
- Notable awards: Order of Canada

Alain Grandbois, CC (May 25, 1900 – March 18, 1975) was a Canadian Quebecer poet, considered the first great modern one.

Traveling around the world in 1918–1939 and sharing the hopes and problems of contemporary man, his work combined the themes of exploring the secrets of the world and studying human destiny, the writing and subject matter having a depth and breadth new to Quebec and becoming a model for young poets of the 1950s.

There is a plaque on the house in which he was born.

== Selected works ==
- Né à Québec: Louis Jolliet (1933)
- Îles de la nuit (1944)
- Avant le chaos (1945)

== Honours ==
- In 1950, he was awarded the Ludger-Duvernay Prize
- In 1954, he was awarded the Royal Society of Canada's Lorne Pierce Medal.
- In 1967, he was made a Companion of the Order of Canada.
- In 1970, he was awarded the Government of Quebec's Prix Athanase-David.
