= Jean-Philippe Bergeron (writer) =

Canadian poet

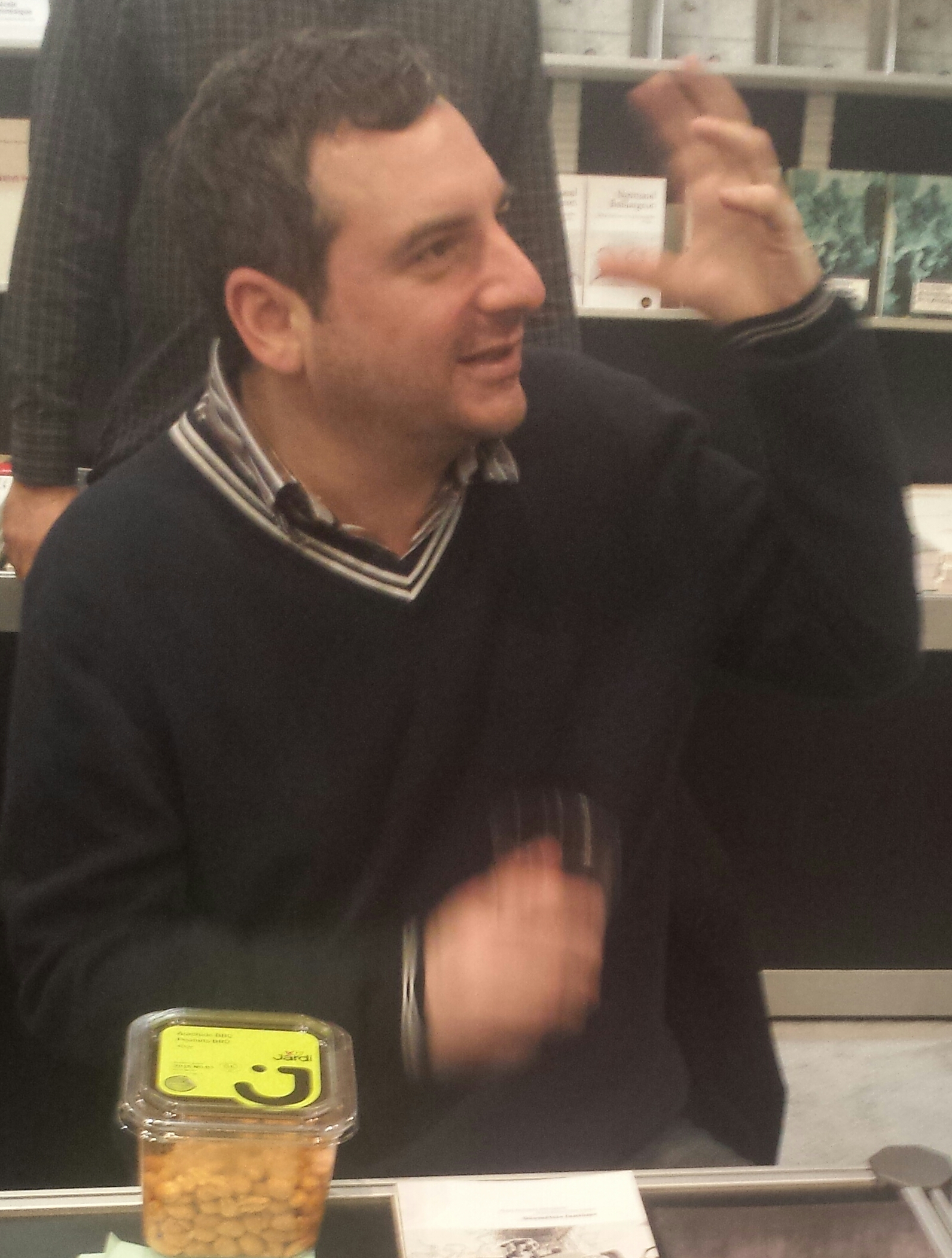
Jean Philippe Bergeron

Jean-Philippe Bergeron (born 1978 Saint-Hyacinthe) is a Canadian French-language writer and poet. He won the Prix Alain-Grandbois in 2004.

== Publications ==
- Bergeron, Jean-Philippe. Visages de l'affolement: poèmes. Outremont, Québec : Lanctôt, 2003. ISBN 2-89485-245-2 : Montréal : Poètes de brousse, 2016. ISBN 9782923338972
- Bergeron, Jean-Philippe. Débris des ruches. Montréal : Poètes de brousse, 2005. ISBN 2-923338-03-0
- Bergeron, Jean-Philippe. Ombres. Montréal : Poètes de brousse, 2007. ISBN 978-2923338125
- Bergeron, Jean-Philippe. Géométrie fantôme (with Jean-Sébastien Denis). Montréal : Poètes de brousse, 2011. ISBN 978-2923338125
- Bergeron, Jean-Philippe. Les Planches anatomiques. Montréal : Poètes de Brousse, 2014, ISBN 9782923338743
