= Tania Langlais =

Canadian poet and educator

Tania Langlais (born 1979) is a Quebec poet and educator.

She was born in Montreal and was educated at the Université du Québec à Montréal. Langlais teaches French at the college level.

Her work has appeared in a number of anthologies. Langlais received the Prix Émile-Nelligan in 2000 for her collection of poetry Douze bêtes aux chemises de l'homme, the youngest to receive this award. She has also received the Prix Jacqueline-Déry-Mochon in 2001, the first prize for poetry from Radio-Canada in 2002 and the Prix Joseph-S. Stauffer in 2005.

She won the Governor General's Award for French-language poetry at the 2021 Governor General's Awards for her collection Pendant que Perceval tombait. She was previously nominated in the same category in 2001 for Douze bêtes aux chemises de l'homme.

== Works ==
- Douze bêtes aux chemises de l'homme (2000)
- La clarté s'installe comme un chat (2004)
- Kennedy sait de quoi je parle (2008)
- Pendant que Perceval tombait (2020)
