= Marcel Labine =

Canadian Quebec poet (1948–2026)

Marcel Labine (25 February 1948 – 4 May 2026) was a Canadian poet in Quebec.

== Life and career ==
Labine was born on 25 February 1948. He graduated from the Université de Montréal.

He taught literature at Maisonneuve College in Montreal from 1971 to 2004. Labine contributed to several periodicals including Spiral, Red Herbs, Moebius and New Bar.

Labine died on 4 May 2026, at the age of 78.

== Works ==
- Lisse, [Montréal: Herbes rouges], 0441–6627; 31, 1975, [28] p.; 20 cm
- Marcel Labine, Normand de Bellefeuille, L'appareil, [Montréal: Herbes rouges], 0441–6627; 38, 1976, [44] p.; 20 cm
- Les lieux domestiques, [Montréal: Herbes rouges], 0441–6627; 49, 1977, 22 p.; 20 cm
- Les allures de ma mort, [Montréal: Herbes rouges], 0441–6627; 73, 1979
- La marche de la dictée, [Montréal: Herbes rouges], 0441–6627; 83, 1980, 24 p.; 20 cm
- Des trous dans l'anecdote, [Montréal: Herbes rouges], 0441–6627; 87, 1981, 25 p.; 20 cm
- Les proses graduelles, [Montréal: Herbes rouges], 0441–6627; 96, 1981, 21 p.; 20 cm
- Normand de Bellefeuille, Marcel Labine, Les matières de ce siècle, [Montréal: Herbes rouges], 0441–6627; 130, 1984, 42 p.; 20 cm ISBN 2-8927-2014-1
- Les lieux domestiques: poésie et prose, 1975–1987, Montréal: Les Herbes rouges, coll. « Enthousiasme », 1997, 208 p.; 21 cm ISBN 2-8941-9104-9
- Musiques, dernier mouvement, Outremont: NJ, coll. « Auteur/e », 1987, 69 p.; 23 cm ISBN 2893140955 — Note: Constitute le n^{o} 212 de La Nouvelle barre du jour
- Papiers d'épidémie: poésie, Montréal: Herbes rouges, 1987, 40 p.; 21 cm ISBN 2-9200-5137-7
- Territoires fétiches: poésie (première éd. en 1990), Montréal: Les Herbes rouges, 2001, 104 p.; 19 cm ISBN 2-8941-9192-8
- Machines imaginaires: poésie, Montréal: Les Herbes rouges, 1993, 60 p.: 2 ill.; 21 cm ISBN 2-8941-9041-7
- Papiers d'épidémie: poésie; suivi de Le chiffre de l'émotion: entretien avec André Lamarre, Montréal: Les Herbes rouges, 1994, 115 p.; 21 cm ISBN 2-8941-9044-1
- Territoires fétiches: poésie, Montréal: Les Herbes rouges, 1996, 104 p.; 21 cm ISBN 2-8941-9101-4 and 978-2-8941-9192-7
- Carnages: poésie, Montréal: Les Herbes rouges, 1997, 118 p.; 21 cm ISBN 2-8941-9110-3
- Le roman américain en question [essai], Montréal: Éditions Québec Amérique, coll. « En question », 2002, 142 p.; 21 cm ISBN 2-7644-0196-5, 978-2-7644-1904-5 and 978-2-7644-1533-7
- Le pas gagné: poésie, Montréal: Les Herbes rouges, 2005, 173 p.; 21 cm ISBN 2-8941-9244-4 and 978-2-8941-9244-3
- Le tombeau où nous courons, Montréal: Les Herbes rouges, 2012 ISBN 978-2-8941-9333-4
- Promenades dans nos dépôts lapidaires, Montréal: Les Herbes rouges, 2013, 120 p. ISBN 978-2-8941-9351-8

== Honours ==
- 1988: Prix du Gouverneur général, Papiers d'épidémie
- 1988: Prix d'excellence pour le meilleur texte de fiction de l'Association des éditeurs de périodiques culturels québécois, Musiques, dernier mouvement
- 1994: Finalist Prix du Gouverneur général, Machines imaginaires
- 2006: Grand prix Québecor du Festival international de la poésie, Le pas gagné
- 2012: Bourse d'écriture Gabrielle-Roy
- 2013: Prix du Festival de la poésie de Montréal, Le tombeau où nous courons
- 2013: Finaliste du Prix de poésie Estuaire - Bistro Leméac, Le tombeau où nous courons
