= Claude Beausoleil =

Canadian poet and writer (1948–2020)

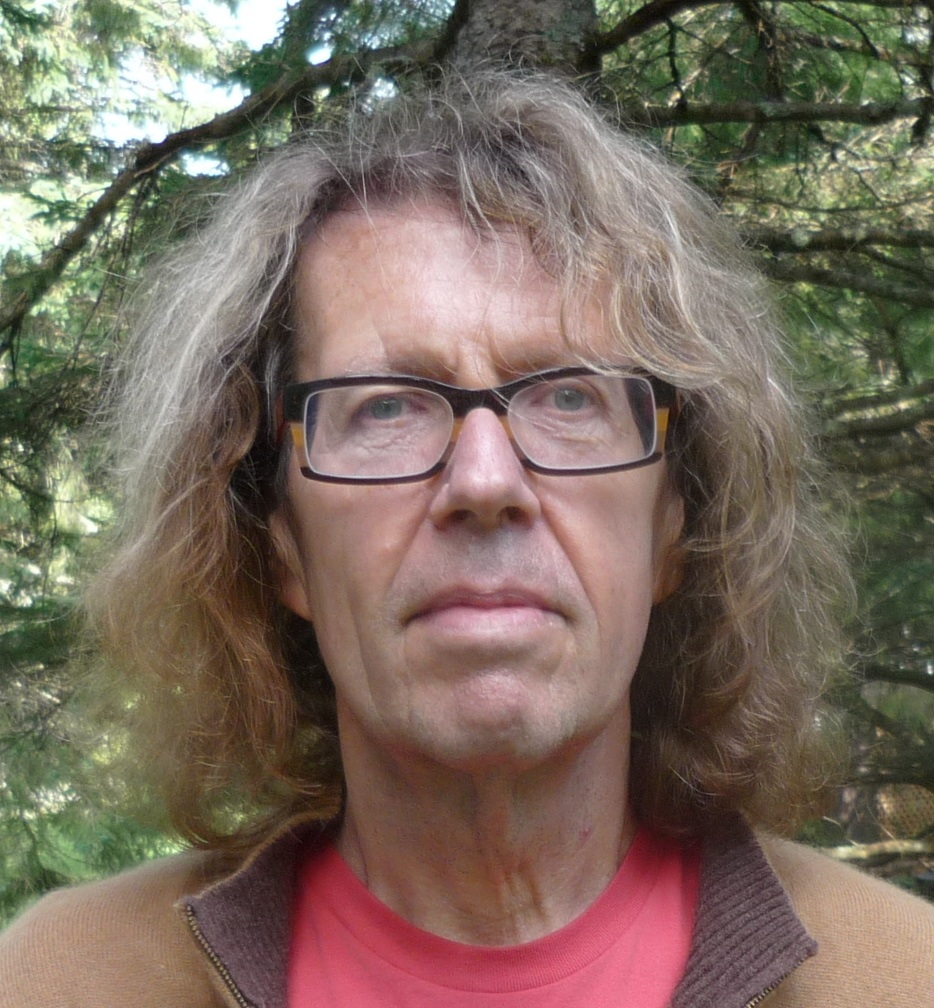
- Claude Beausoleil
- Born: 16 November 1948; Montreal, Quebec, Canada
- Died: 24 July 2020 (aged 71); Montreal, Quebec, Canada
- Occupation: Writer

Claude Beausoleil (16 November 1948 – 24 July 2020) was a Canadian writer, poet, and essayist.

== Biography ==
Beausoleil studied literature at the Université du Québec à Montréal and earned a master's degree with a thesis on Hubert Aquin. He then earned a doctoral degree in Quebec poetry from the Université de Sherbrooke.

In 1972, he began publishing collections of poetry on the sensuality and emotion of words, in addition to focusing on Quebec's unique cultural situation as the last remaining francophone entity in North America. In 1980, he won the Prix Émile-Nelligan for his poem, Au milieu du corps l'attraction s'insinue.

In 1973, Beausoleil moved to Longueuil to teach at Cégep Édouard-Montpetit. He was Director of the magazine Lèvres Urbaines, and he also wrote in Estuaire, Europe, and The American Poetry Review. He had a poetry column in the newspaper Le Devoir from 1978 to 1985.

In 1991, Beausoleil won the Prix littéraires du Journal de Montréal for Une certaine fin de siècle. He was also a finalist for the 1991 Governor General's Awards. He won the 1997 Prix Alain-Grandbois for Grand Hôtel des étrangers. La Blessure du silence won the Prix Louise-Labé in 2009, and Mystère Wilde won the Prix Heredia of the Académie française in 2015.

Beausoleil was a member of the Académie Mallarmé. His archives are kept in the Bibliothèque et Archives nationales du Québec

Claude Beausoleil died on 24 July 2020 in Montreal at the age of 71.

== Works ==
=== Poetry ===
- Intrusion ralentie (1972)
- Les Bracelets d'ombre (1973)
- Journal mobile (1974)
- Avatars du trait (1974)
- Le Sang froid du reptile - poésie tropicale (1975)
- Motilité (1975)
- Ahuntsic dream, suivi de Now (1975)
- Sens interdit (1976)
- Le Temps maya (1977)
- Les Marges du désir (1977)
- La Surface du paysage, textes et poèmes (1979)
- Au milieu du corps l'attraction s'insinue, poèmes 1975-1980 (1980)
- Dans la matière rêvant comme d'une émeute (1982)
- Une certaine fin de siècle, poèmes 1973-1983 (1983)
- D'autres sourires de stars (1983)
- Langue secrète (1984)
- S'inscrit sous le ciel gris en graphiques de feu (1985)
- Découvertes des heures (1985)
- Il y a des nuits que nous habitons tous (1986), illustrated by Herménégilde Chiasson
- travaux d'infini (1988)
- Grand Hotel des étrangers (1988)
- Parler 101 (1989)
- Une certaine fin de siècle, tome 2 (1991)
- Fureur de Mexico (1992)
- L'Usage du temps (1993)
- Fusion (1993), illustrated by Jocelyne Aird-Bélanger
- Le Déchiffrement du monde (1993)
- La Ville aux yeux d'hiver (1994)
- La Vie singulière (1994)
- La Manière d'être (1994)
- Le Rythme des lieux (1995)
- Rue du jour (1995)
- Quatre Échos de l'obscur (1997)
- Le Chant du voyageur (1998)
- Exilé (1999)
- L'espace est devant nous (1999)
- La Parole jusqu'en ses envoûtements (2001)
- Les Passions extérieures (2002)
- Dépossessions (2003)
- Le Baroque du Nord (2003)
- Lecture des éblouissements (2004)
- Regarde, tu vois (2006)
- L'Inscription lyrique (2007)
- Sonnets numériques (2007)
- La Blessure du silence (2009)
- Black Billie (2010)
- L'Autre Voix (2011)
- De plus loin que le vent (2011)
- Amérikerouac (2012)
- Mémoire de neige (2013)
- Mystère Wilde (2014)
- Alma (2015)
- Cette musique de Keats (2017)
- En un grand souffle noir (2019)

=== Novels ===
- Promenade modern style (1975)
- Dead line - récits (1974)
- Fort Sauvage (1994), réédition 1996
- Architecte des sentiments (2005)
- Alma (2006)

=== Essays ===
- Les Livres parlent (1984)
- Extase et Déchirure (1987)
- Librement dit, carnets parisiens (1997)
- Oscar Wilde, pour l’amour du Beau (2001)

=== Anthologies ===
- Poésie du Québec (1991)
- La poésie suisse romande (1993)

=== Collectives ===
- Québec 2008 : 40 poètes du Québec et de France

== Prizes ==
- Prix Émile-Nelligan for Au milieu du corps l'attraction s'insinue (1980)
- Finalist for the 1983 Governor General's Awards for Une certaine fin de siècle : poésie 1973-1983
- Became a Member of the Ordre des francophones d'Amérique (1989)
- Prix de poésie Terrasses Saint-Sulpice (1991)
- Finalist for the 1991 Governor General's Awards for Une certaine fin de siècle, tome 2
- Prix littéraires du Journal de Montréal de poésie for Une certaine fin de siècle, tome 2 (1991)
- Prix Georges-Limbour for Fureur de Mexico (1993)
- Prix Alain-Grandbois for Grand Hôtel des étrangers (1997)
- Grand Prix du Festival international de la poésie (1997)
- Finalist for the 1999 Governor General's Awards for Le Chant du voyageur
- Prix de poésie Gatien-Lapointe - Jaime-Sabines (2004)
- Grand Prix du Festival international de la poésie for Lecture des éblouissements (2004)
- Prix Louise-Labé for La Blessure du silence (2009)
- Finalist for the Prix Guillaume Apollinaire for Black Billie (2010)
- Poet of the City of Montreal (2011)
- Finalist of the Prix Poésie of the Académie française (2013)
- Prix Heredia of the Académie française (2015)
