= Paul Chanel Malenfant =

Québécois writer and professor

Paul Chanel Malenfant (born 1960) is a Québécois writer and professor. He has been a two-time winner of the Governor General's Award for French-language poetry, winning at the 2001 Governor General's Awards for Des ombres portées and at the 2025 Governor General's Awards for Au passage du fleuve.

== Life ==
He graduated from the Université de Montréal and the Université Laval.

He was a professor at Cégep de Rimouski until 1982, and then later at the Université du Québec à Rimouski from 1983 until 2006.

== Works ==
- Poèmes de la mer pays, Hurtubise HMH, 1972, ISBN 9780775800555
- Forges froides, Quinze, 1977, ISBN 9780885651450
- Le mot à mot, Le Noroît, 1982, ISBN 9782890180697
- Les Noms du père, Le Noroît, 1985
- En tout état de corps, Écrits des Forges, 1985
- Coqs à deux têtes, NBJ, 1987
- Tirer au clair, Le Noroît, 1988
- Le Siècle inachevé, Éditeq, 1989
- La Table des matières, Le Noroît, 1990
- Voix transitoires, Le Noroît, 1992
- Le verbe être, L’Hexagone, 1993, ISBN 9782890064737
- Hommes de profil, Écrits des Forges, 1994
- Fleuves, Le Noroît, 1997
- Quoi, déjà la nuit?, L’Hexagone, 1998
- Des airs de famille, L’Hexagone, 2000
- Des ombres portées, Le Noroît, 2001
- Vivre ainsi, Le Noroît, 2005
- Si tu allais quelque part, Éditions La courte échelle, 2003
- Rue Daubenton, L’Hexagone, 2007, ISBN 9782890067967
- Tombeaux, L’Hexagone, 2010
- La petite mariée de Chagall, 2012
- D'un genre, l'autre?, Le Noroît, 2015
- Toujours Jamais, Éditions de l'Hexagone, 2014, ISBN 9782896480487

Works in English

- If this Were Death, Translator Marylea MacDonald, Guernica Editions, 2009, ISBN 9781550712711

== Honors ==
- 1983 - Prix du Salon du livre de Rimouski (plus tard renommé Prix Jovette-Bernier)
- 1985 - Finaliste au Prix du Gouverneur général, Les noms du père, suivi de Lieux dits: Italique
- 1989 - Prix littéraire des Associés
- 1994 - Finaliste au Prix du Gouverneur général, Hommes de profil
- 1997 - Finaliste au Prix du Gouverneur général, Fleuves
- 1998 - Prix littéraires Radio-Canada
- 1998 - Prix Alain-Grandbois
- 1998 - Grand Prix du Festival international de la poésie, Fleuves
- 2001 - Prix du Gouverneur général, Des ombres portées
- 2003 - Finaliste au Prix du Gouverneur général, Si tu allais quelque part
