= Jean-Marc Desgent =

Poet, novelist, and literary critic

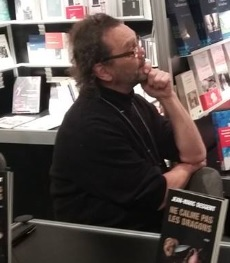
Desgent in 2015

Jean-Marc Desgent is a poet, novelist and literary critic. He was a professor at Collège Édouard-Montpetit from 1978 to 2011. He lives in Montreal, Quebec.

== Works ==
- Faillite sauvage. Montréal, (Québec), Canada: Éditions Les herbes rouges. 1981. p. 38.
- Transfigurations. Montréal, (Québec), Canada: Éditions Les herbes rouges. 1982. p. 34. ISBN 978-2-89419-085-2.
- Aux traces même de la panique. Liège, Belgique (act. St-Quentin-de-Caplong, France): Atelier de l'Agneau éditeur. 1982. p. 32.
- Malgré la mort du monde. Montréal, (Québec), Canada: Éditions Les herbes rouges. 1985. p. 28. ISBN 978-2-89272-016-7.
- Deux amants au revolver. Montréal, (Québec), Canada: Éditions Les herbes rouges. 1987. p. 39. ISBN 978-2-89272-034-1.
- L'état de grâce. Montréal, (Québec), Canada: Éditions Les herbes rouges. 1989. p. 44. ISBN 978-2-89272-056-3.
- Desgent, Jean-Marc (1992). On croit trop que rien ne meurt. Trois-Rivières, (Québec), Canada. p. 48. ISBN 978-2-89046-249-6 – via Écrits des Forges.
- Ce que je suis devant personne, Les Écrits des Forges, 1994, Trois-Rivières, Qc, Canada, 50 pages
- Les quatre états du soleil. Trois-Rivières, (Québec), Canada: Écrits des Forges. 1994. p. 51. ISBN 978-2-89046-343-1.
- Les paysages de l'extase. Montréal, (Québec), Canada: Éditions Les herbes rouges. 1997. p. 50. ISBN 978-2-89419-126-2.
- La théorie des catastrophes. Montréal, (Québec), Canada: Éditions Les herbes rouges. 2000. p. 49. ISBN 978-2894191729.
- Errances (en collaboration avec Guy Lanoue), Essai, ethnologie, Éditions du Musée canadien des civilisations, 2005, Ottawa, On, Canada, 170 pages
- Vingtièmes siècles. Trois-Rivières, (Québec), Canada: Écrits des Forges. 2005. pp. 64. ISBN 978-2-89046-910-5.
- Filles et garçons manqués. Paris: suivi de Les anges dans nos campagnes, Éditions Le Grand Incendie. 2008. p. 44. ISBN 978-2-89272-056-3.
- O comme agression. Montréal, (Québec), Canada: Éditions Les herbes rouges. 1983. p. 33. ISBN 978-2892720044.
- Portraits de famille. Trois-Rivières, (Québec), Canada: Écrits des Forges. 2010. p. 72. ISBN 978-2896451463.
- Artaud-Gauvreau, Essai, Poètes de brousse, 2010, Montréal, Qc, Canada, 70 pages
- Qu'importe maintenant, Poètes de brousse, 2012, Montréal, Qc, Canada, 62 pages
- Ne calme pas les dragons, Éditions de la Grenouillère, 2013, Saint-Sauveur-des-Monts, Qc, Canada, 81 pages

== Honors ==
- 1994 - Grand Prix du Festival international de la poésie
- 2000 - Prix Rina-Lasnier
- 2002 - Prix Félix-Antoine-Savard
- 2005 - Grand Prix du Festival international de la poésie - Prix du Gouverneur général - Prix Estuaire des Terrasses Saint-Sulpice
- 2006 - Prix Jaime Sabinès/Gatien Lapointe
- 2010 - Prix International de Poésie Antonio-Viccaro (Paris)
- 2012 - Prix de la Bande à Mœbius
- 2013 - Prix d'excellence - section poésie - de la SODEP
- 2020 - Prix Alain-Grandbois
