= Martine Audet =

Canadian poet

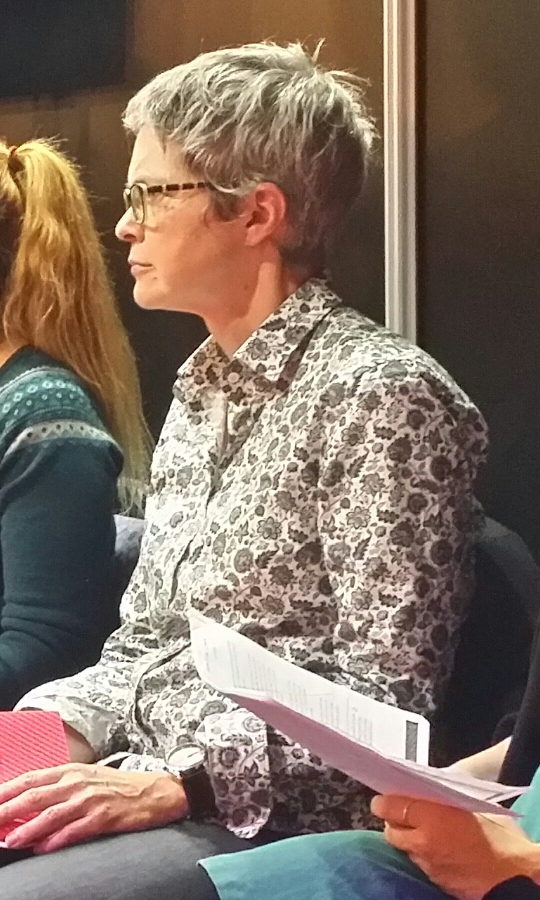
- Born: October 15, 1961 (age 64); Montreal, Quebec, Canada
- Occupation: poet
- Writing career
- Period: 1990s-present
- Notable works: Les tables, Tête première / Dos / Contre dos

Martine Audet (born October 15, 1961) is a Canadian poet from Montreal, Quebec. She won the Governor General's Award for French-language poetry at the 2020 Governor General's Awards for her poetry collection La Société des cendres.

She was previously a nominee at the 2000 Governor General's Awards for Orbites, at the 2007 Governor General's Awards for Les manivelles, at the 2011 Governor General's Awards for Je demande pardon à l'espèce qui brille and at the 2015 Governor General's Awards for Tête première / Dos / Contre dos, and won the Prix Alain-Grandbois in 2001 for Les tables.

== Selected works ==
- Poèmes du lendemain ("Poems from the following day") (1993)
- Les murs clairs ("The clear walls") (1996)
- Doublures ("Stuffings") (1998)
- Orbites ("Eye-sockets") (2000)
- Les tables ("The Tables") (2001)
- Les mélancolies ("The Wistful Sadnesses") (2003)
- Que ferais-je du jour ("What Would I Make of the Day") (2005)
- Les manivelles ("Cranks") (2006)
- L'amour des objets ("The Love of the Objects") (2009)
- Je demande pardon à l'espèce qui brille ("I Beg Forgiveness of the Shining Species") (2010)
- Le ciel n'est qu'un détour à brûler ("The Sky is Just a Bend to Burn") (2010)
- Des lames entières ("Some Whole Blades") (2011)
- Des voix stridentes ou rompues (Some Voices either Shrill or Broken") (2013)
- Tête première / Dos / Contre dos ("First Head / Back / Against Back") (2015)

== See also ==
- Canadian literature
- Canadian poetry
- List of Canadian poets
- List of Canadian writers
- List of Quebec writers
