= Alan Moore (poet) =

Alan Moore (born 1960, Dublin), is an Irish writer and poet, published by Anvil Press Poetry.

His first collection of poems, Opia (1986) was a UK Poetry Book Society Choice, a distinction for a first collection. Michael Kenneally complimented Moore's creativity in Poetry in contemporary Irish Literature.

His second collection, How Now! (2010) was described as "a searingly autobiographical book which bears comparison with Paul Durcan's Daddy, Daddy," and "a fine cumulative portrait of growing up in Ireland." Another reviewer commented: "The deadpan, affectless tone of these childhood poems makes them all the more disturbing. Moore has no designs on the reader. The vignettes are presented in an almost forensic fashion, it is up to us to fill in the missing emotion, blanked by alcohol, repression, conformity." Two of Moore's poems were included in the Dublin Poetry and Places Anthology "If Ever You Go"

Educated by the Christian Brothers, he is a graduate of both University College Dublin (BA, English and Philosophy) and Trinity College Dublin (MBA). He worked in the Office of the Revenue Commissioners (on the drafting of the Taxes Consolidation Act 1997) and in legal publishing before becoming a tax consultant and publisher. He is widely known for his regular articles in The Sunday Business Post, and is the author of the best-selling Tax Magic.
