= Cécile Cloutier =

Canadian writer and educator

Cécile Cloutier (June 13, 1930 - September 30, 2017) was a Canadian writer and educator.

The daughter of Adrien Cloutier and Maria Lantagne, she was born in Quebec City and studied at the Collège Jésus-Marie de Sillery, at Laval University and at the Université de Paris, going on to earn a doctorate from the Sorbonne and a Master of Philosophy from McMaster University. She studied a variety of languages including Sanskrit and Inuktitut. From 1955 to 1958, she taught French literature, Latin, Greek and Spanish at the Collège des Ursulines and at Marymount College in Quebec City. She was a professor in the French department at the University of Ottawa from 1958 to 1964. She then taught aesthetics and French and Quebec literature at the University of Toronto. Cloutier founded the Canadian Society for Aesthetics (Société canadienne d'esthétique). She was a member of the Société des gens de lettres of France and of the PEN club of Paris.

Her collection of poems L'Écouté received the Governor General's Award for French-language poetry in 1986. Cloutier also received the silver medal of the Société des écrivains français. Her poetry has been translated into a number of languages, including English, Spanish, Danish, Polish and Ukrainian.

== Selected works ==
- Cuivre et soies, poetry (1964)
- anthologie de poésie québécoise contemporaine, poetry anthology (1968), editor
- Cannelles et craies, poetry (1969)
- Paupières, poetry (1970)
- Chaleuils, poetry (1978)
- Springtime of spoken words, selected poems (1979), translated by Alexandre Amprimoz
