= Catherine Lalonde =

Canadian poet and journalist

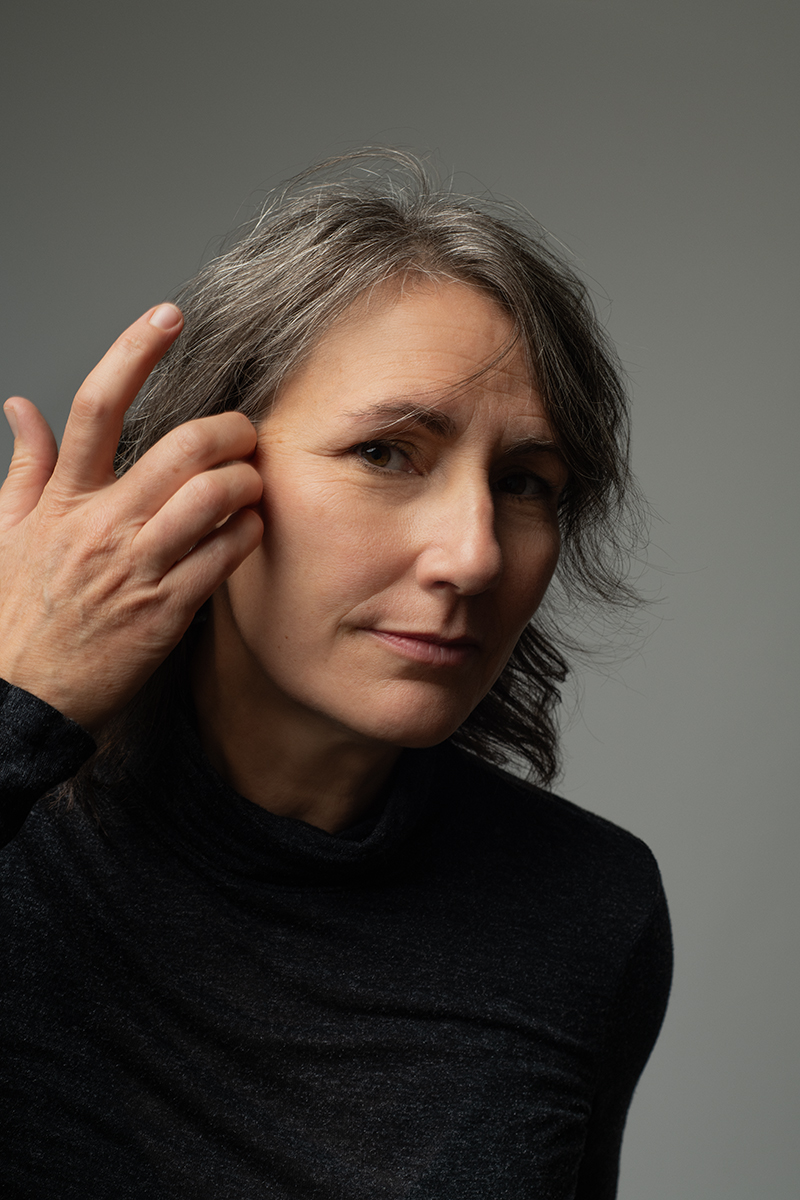
Image of Catherine Lalonde

Catherine Lalonde (born 1974) is a Quebec poet and journalist.

She was born in Montreal and studied theatre and contemporary dance. At the age of 16, she published her first collection of poems Jeux de brume. She has worked in media and communications, as a physical trainer and has written for Le Devoir, Le Libraire, Livre d'Ici and Entre les lignes.

For her poems and stories, she won the Prix Critères Intercollégial in 1991, the Prix du Chantauteuil in 1994, the story contest sponsored by the magazine Voir in 1996, the contest of the Wallonie Bruxelles pour la jeunesse agency in 1999 and the Prix de la nouvelle awarded by Radio-Canada in 1997. Her collection of poetry Corps étranger won the Prix Émile-Nelligan in 2008. In 2009, she presented La nuit sera longue, a multi-media show incorporating poetry, dance and theatre.
