= Normand de Bellefeuille =

Canadian poet (1949–2024)

Normand de Bellefeuille (French: [nɔʁmɑ̃ də bɛlfœj]; 31 December 1949 – 8 January 2024) was a Canadian poet, writer, literary critic, and essayist. He was a two-time winner of the Governor General's Award for French-language poetry, winning at the 2000 Governor General's Awards for La Marche de l'aveugle sans son chien ("The Blind Man's Walk Without his Dog") and at the 2016 Governor General's Awards for Le poème est une maison de bord de mer ("The Poem is a Seaside House").

== Life and career ==
De Bellefeuille was born in Montreal, Quebec on 31 December 1949. He studied at the Cégep de Maisonneuve and at the Université de Montréal. In 1972, he was a professor at the Cégep de Maisonneuve. He was literary director at Québec Amérique from 1997 to 2010, and at Éditions Druide. He appeared at Metropolis bleu.

De Bellefeuille died on 8 January 2024, at the age of 74.

== Works ==
- 1973: Monsieur Isaac, en collaboration avec Gilles Racette, l'Actuelle
- 1974: Ças suivi de Trois, Les Herbes Rouges, no 20
- 1976: Le Texte justement, Les Herbes Rouges, no 34
- 1976: L'Appareil, en collaboration avec Marcel Labine, Les Herbes Rouges, no 38
- 1977: Les Grandes Familles, Les Herbes Rouges, no 52
- 1978: La Belle Conduite, Les Herbes Rouges, no 63
- 1979: Pourvu que ça ait mon nom, en collaboration avec Roger Des Roches, Les Herbes Rouges
- 1980: Dans la conversation et la diction des monstres, Les Herbes Rouges ISBN 9782892728804
- 1983: Le Livre du devoir, Les Herbes Rouges
- 1984: Miser, la Nouvelle Barre du Jour
- 1984: Straight Pose ou La Mort de Socrate, la Nouvelle Barre du Jour
- 1984: Les Matières de ce siècle, en collaboration avec Marcel Labine, Les Herbes Rouges, no 130
- 1985: Cold Cuts un/deux, Les Herbes Rouges, no 136
- 1985: À propos du texte/textualisation, en collaboration avec Jean Yves Collette, la Nouvelle Barre du Jour
- 1985: Lascaux, Les Herbes Rouges ISBN 9782920051263
- 1986: Quand on a une langue, on peut aller à Rome, en collaboration avec Louise Dupré, la Nouvelle Barre du Jour
- 1986: Catégoriques un deux et trois, Écrits des Forges
  - (translated by D.G. Jones), Categorics: One, Two and Three ISBN 9780889104525
- 1986: À double sens, échange sur quelques pratiques modernes, en collaboration avec Hugues Corriveau, Les Herbes Rouges
- 1987: Heureusement, ici il y a la guerre, Les Herbes Rouges, 1987 ISBN 9782920051355
- 1989: Ce que disait Alice, L'Instant même ISBN 9782921197977
- 1991: Obscènes, Les Herbes Rouges ISBN 9782894190012
- 1993: Notte Oscura, en collaboration avec Alain Laframboise, Le Noroît ISBN 9782890182127
- 1997: Nous mentons tous, Québec Amérique ISBN 9782890379176
- 1999: La Marche de l'aveugle sans son chien, Québec Amérique ISBN 9782896451920
- 2001: Un visage pour commencer, Écrits des Forges ISBN 9782890466203
- 2001: Lancers légers, Le Noroît
- 2003: Elle était belle comme une idée, Québec Amérique ISBN 9782764402627
- 2006: Votre appel est important, Québec Amérique ISBN 9782764405017
- 2009: Mon nom, Le Noroît
- 2010: Un poker à Lascaux, Québec Amérique
- 2011: Mon visage, Le Noroît ISBN 9782890186743
- 2012: Mon bruit, Le Noroît ISBN 9782890187382
- 2014: Le poème est une maison de long séjour, Œuvres de Pierre P. Fortin, Le Noroît ISBN 9782890188938

== Honors ==
- 1984 – Prix Émile-Nelligan, Le Livre du devoir
- 1986 – Grand Prix de poésie de la Fondation des Forges Catégoriques un deux et trois
- 1986 – Grand Prix du Festival international de la poésie
- 1989 – Prix littéraire Adrienne-Choquette Ce que disait Alice
- 1989 – Concours de nouvelles de Radio-Canada, Ce que disait Alice
- 1997 – Prix Félix-Antoine-Savard
- 2000 – Prix Alain-Grandbois, La Marche de l'aveugle sans son chien
- 2000 – 2e prix des Prix littéraires Radio-Canada
- 2000 – Prix du Gouverneur général, La Marche de l'aveugle sans son chien
- 2002 – Prix Odyssée en poésie
- 2012 – Grand prix Québecor du Festival international de la poésie, Mon bruit
