= Le Festif! =

Music festival in Baie-Saint-Paul, Canada

- Dates: last weekend of July
- Frequency: Annually
- Locations: Baie-Saint-Paul, Québec, Canada
- Inaugurated: 2010
- Website: www.lefestif.ca

Le Festif! is a music festival held annually in Baie-Saint-Paul in the province of Quebec, in Canada. The event is held on the last weekend of July, one week before the opening of the Symposium of Contemporary Art. It takes its name from the French word "festif" meaning "festive". The event is described as a mix between popular musical and circus-arts. In 2012, more than 10,000 people attended le festif!. The fourth addition in 2013 attendance was capped at 14,000.

== Timeline of the event ==
The statistics below illustrate the growth in attendance of the Le Festif! event, as well as other facts and figures.

Year	Location	Participants	Pre-Sale	Full Price	Past Performances
2010	Parc du Gouffre	2,000		$20	Les Cowboys Fringants, Replay the Beatles, Papagroove, Buffet Froid
2011	Parc du Gouffre	2,500	$20	$25	Robert Charlebois, Les Trois Accords, Colectivo, David Cimon, Delirium Tremens
2012	Centre-ville	10,000	$35	$50	Vincent Vallières, Bernard Adamus, Plume Latraverse, La Bottine Souriante, Philippe Brach
2013	Centre-ville	14,000	$50	$70	The Cat Empire, Daniel Bélanger, Les Colocs, Sunny Duval, Lisa LeBlanc, Papagroove, Keith Kouna, Gros Mené, Canailles, Bloodshot Bill, Philippe B., Roma Carnivale
2014	Centre-ville	18,000	$65	$75	Alpha Blondy, Louis-Jean Cormier, Loco Locass, Les Cowboys Fringants, Misteur Valaire, Karim Ouellet, Random Recipe, Dead Obies, So Called, Quebec Redneck Bluegrass Project, Béatrice Bonifassi, Alaclair Ensemble, Les Breastfeeders, Les Hay Babies, Philippe Brach, Pépé et sa Guitare, David Marin, Cou Coupé, Tram des Balkans, Dylan Perron et Élixir de Gumbo, Speakeasy Electroswing, Ponctuation, Francis Faubert, Artist of the Year, Heavy Soundz, Caltâr-Bateau, Le Winston Band, Patrick Gosselin, El Pornos, Fanfare Gipsy Pigs, Kumpa'nia, Collectif Devenchi, Machine de Cirque, Les Gargouilles, Noëmie Armellin
2015	Centre-ville	20,000			Reel Big Fish, Les Trois Accords, Alex Nevsky (musician), Radio Radio (band), Bernard Adamus, Galaxie (band), Marie-Pierre Arthur, Qualité Hotel, Loud Lary Ajust, Groenland, Mara Tremblay, Mononc Serge, We Are Wolves, The Franklin Electric, The Planet Smashers, Antoine Corriveau, Dany Placard, Philippe B, Fanny Bloom, Dear Criminals, Pierre Kwenders, Chocolat, The Seasons, Eman & Vlooper, Claude Bégin, Milk & Bone, Louis-Philippe Gingras, Guillaume Beauregard, Dylan Perron et Elixir de Gumbo, Heat, Odeur de Swing, L'orchestre d'hommes-orchestres, What Cheer? Brigade, Eric Larochelle, Spicy Circus, L'ours, l'écureuil, le dauphin, Sweet Grass, Émile Bilodeau, Piero Vélo, Prieur et Landry
2016	Centre-ville	28,000			Half Moon Run, The Cat Empire, Champion et ses G-Strings, Les Sœurs Boulay, Plume Latraverse, The Barr Brothers, Fred Fortin, Les Goules, Dumas (musician), GrimSkunk, Ariane Moffatt, Avec pas d'casque, Dead Obies, Basia Bulat, Canailles, Yann Perreau, Duchess Says, Yves Lambert, Koriass, Tire le Coyote, Safia Nolin, Violett Pi, Francis Faubert, Detroit Party Marching Band, Beat Sexü, Marco et les Torvis, Mathieu Bérubé, La Famille Ouellette, Duo Christophe et Bruno, Marion Sylvain, Les Hôtesses d'hilaire, Philémon Cimon, Busty and the Bass, I.D.A.L.G., Foutoukours, Anatole, Hungry March Band, Brown, Beat Market, Gab Paquet, Sunny Duval, The Soots
2017	Centre-ville	35,000			Caravan Palace, Xavier Rudd, Valaire, Daniel Bélanger, Timber Timbre, Alaclair Ensemble, Louis-Jean Cormier, Lisa LeBlanc, Klô Pelgag, Richard Séguin, Loco Locass, Xavier Caféïne, Groovy Aardvark, Qualité Motel, We Are Wolves, Karim Ouellet, Antoine Corriveau, Le Couleur, Paupiére, Martha Wainwright, Peter Peter (Canadian musician), Leif Vollebekk, Les Dales Hawerchuk, Philippe B, Laura Sauvage, Rednext Level, KNLO, Voïvod, Chocolat, Plants and Animals, Bernard Adamus, Beyries, De temps antan, Le vent du nord, Yonatan Gat, Lemon Bucket Orkestra
