= Agora du Vieux-Port =

Amphitheatre in Quebec City, Canada

Coordinates: 46.8174°N 71.2005°W

Agora of the Port of Quebec
- Agora du Vieux-Port
- Interactive map of Agora of the Port of Quebec
- Address: Port of Quebec; Quebec City; Canada
- Capacity: 5,000

Construction
- Opened: 1984
- Renovated: 2008

Website
- www.agoraportdequebec.ca

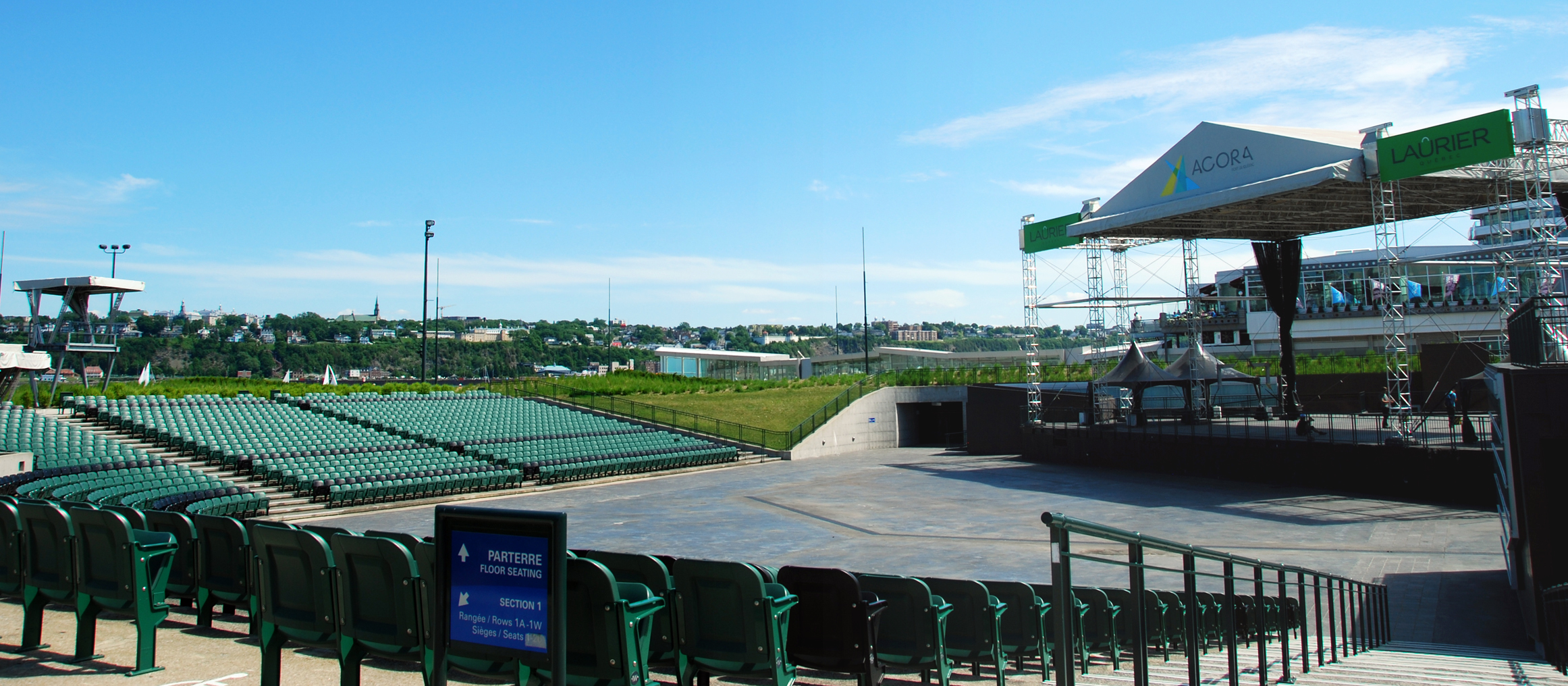
Panorama of the amphitheatre

The Agora du Vieux-Port (English: Agora of the Port of Quebec) is an open-air amphitheatre located in the historic Old Quebec neighborhood of Quebec City, Quebec, Canada. The Agora was built for the 1984 Quebec City Festival, commemorating the 450th anniversary of the arrival of Jacques Cartier in Canada. The venue was renovated in 2008 and can accommodate over 5,000 spectators.

== Performances ==
Some notable shows presented at the Agora:

=== 1980s ===
==== 1984 ====
During Québec 84, there were shows on the large floating stage set up near the Bassin Louise as well as at the Agora.

Agora

- 22 July: Official Opening Ceremony
- 26 July: Buffy Sainte-Marie
- 2, 4 July: Bruce Cockburn
- 6-8 July: David Grisman Quintet
- 9-10 July: Chantal Beaupré and Brenda Wootton: "Le chant des femmes"
- 11 July: Jacques Bertin and Sylvain Lelièvre: "Le chant des hommes"
- 13-14 July: Steve Waring
- 14 July 1984: Claude Dubois
- 16 July: Orchestre Symphonique de Québec
- 17 July: Jim Pepper, Pow Wow and the Quebec Symphony Orchestra
- 18-20 July 1984: Renaud
- 23-24 July: Margie Gillis, Marie-Josée Simard and the Quebec Symphony Orchestra
- 25-27 July: Scratch with Björn Gärdsby and Cheer La Belle
- 28-29 July: Willem Breuker Kollektief
- 30-31 July: Liam O'Flynn and the Quebec Symphony Orchestra
- 1-3 August: Veillée celte with Daiglish, Larsen, Southerland, Patrick Godfrey, Lisa Ornstein Ball, Carr.
- 6 August 1984: Judy Collins
- 7-8 August: Wynton Marsalis
- 9-10 August 1984: UZEB
- 11-12 August: Betty Carter
- 13-14 August: Egberto Gismonti and Naná Vasconcelos and the Quebec Symphony Orchestra
- 15-16 August: Beyleimann - Caratini - Mosalini
- 20-21 August: L. Shankar and the Quebec Symphony Orchestra
- 23-24 August 1984: Beau Dommage
- 25 August 1984: Claude Dubois

Main stage (Bassin Louise)

- 23 June: Robert Charlebois (Main Stage - Bassin Louise)
- 25-27 June: Véronique Béliveau et Dansepartout (Main Stage)
- 28-30 June: Raôul Duguay et Julos Beaucarne (Main Stage)
- 6-7 July: Plume Latraverse (Main Stage)
- 10-11 July: Richard Gotainer
- 12 July: Jean Lapointe and Chanson nouvelle
- 13-14 July: Super Voix with Philip Glass, David Hykes, Jacques Bertin, Brenda Wootton, Pierre Akendengué and guests.
- 16-17 July: Sylvie Vartan
- 18 July: Jim Pepper and Pow Wow
- 19-20 July: Claude Dubois
- 21-22 July: Claude Nougaro, Michel Legrand and the Quebec Symphony Orchestra
- 25-26 July: Alain Lamontagne and André Gagnon
- 27-28 July: Céline Dion
- 28 (am)-29 July: Marie Eykel and the Quebec Symphony Orchestra
- 14-15 August: Paul Piché
- 16-17 August 1984: Dave Brubeck
- 18-19 August: Teo Macero, The Lounge Lizards and the Quebec Symphony Orchestra

==== 1986 ====
- 24 June 1986: Orchestre symphonique de Québec
- 25 June 1986: Images in vogue - The Arrows
- 28 June 1986: Renaud
- 3 July 1986: Katrina and the Waves
- 5 July 1986: Gheorghe Zamfir
- 10 July 1986: Honeymoon Suite
- 12 July 1986: Vic Vogel - Gerry Boulet - John Hammond
- 17 July 1986: Kim Mitchell
- 19 July 1986: Marjo - Claude Dubois
- 24 July 1986: Luba
- 26 July 1986: Michel Fugain
- 2 August 1986: Marjo - Eartha Kitt
- 7 August 1986: Gowan
- 9 August 1986: Oscar Peterson

==== 1987 ====
- 27 June 1987: Philip Glass - Michel Rivard
- 2 July 1987: Tom Cochrane and Red Rider et Richard Séguin
- 9 July 1987: Chalk Circle - Eight seconds
- 16 July 1987: Michel Pagliaro
- 18 July 1987: Céline Dion
- 23 July 1987: Lee Aaron - Helix - Brighton Rock
- 30 July 1987: Gowan
- 6 August 1987: Honeymoon Suite
- 20 August 1987: The Box
- 22 August 1987: UZEB
- 27 August 1987: Glass Tiger
- 20 August 1987: The Box

==== 1988 ====
- 5 July 1988: Gheorghe Zamfir
- 12 July 1988: Dissidenten
- 14 July 1988: Daniel Lavoie
- 30 July 1988: Johnny Cash and June Carter Cash
- 4 August 1988: Honeymoon Suite
- 22 August 1988: Cheap Trick - Luba
- 24 August 1988: Johnny Clegg
- 28 August 1988: Andy Summers - Sade
- 3 September 1988: Tangerine Dream - Andy Summers

==== 1989 ====
- 29 June 1989: Melissa Etheridge - Andrew Cash
- 3 July 1989 - 4 July 1989: Samantha Fox
- 8 July 1989: Sass Jordan - Glass Tiger
- 24 July 1989: Howard Jones
- 29 July 1989: Mike + The Mechanics - The Outfield
- 1 August 1989: Herbert Grönemeyer - Tom Cochrane
- 2 August 1989: Mitsou
- 12 August 1989: Stevie Ray Vaughan - Stray Cats
- 25 August 1989: Anderson Bruford Wakeman Howe
- 3 September 1989: Rick Astley - Martika

=== 1990s ===
==== 1990 ====
- 19 June 1990: Whitesnake and Faster Pussycat
- 30 June 1990: Marillion
- 6 July 1990: Chick Corea and Eric Johnson
- 8 July 1990: Les BB
- 11 July 1990: Suzanne Vega
- 13 July 1990: Fernand Gignac
- 19 July 1990: Joe Satriani - Paul Laine
- 20 July 1990: Bruce Hornsby and The Range
- 22 July 1990: Joël Denis
- 8 August 1990: Milli Vanilli - Young MC - Seduction
- 10 August 1990: André Lejeune
- 18 August 1990: Ronnie James Dio

==== 1991 ====
- 30 June 1991: Plume Latraverse and Les Parfaits Salauds
- 9 July 1991: Rock et Belles Oreilles
- 21 July 1991: Niagara
- 3 August 1991: Céline Dion
- 18 August 1991: Styx
- 31 August 1991: Celine Dion - Breen Leboeuf (additional show)
- 6 September 1991: Dee Palmer

==== 1992 ====
- 12 July 1992: Indochine
- 20 July 1992: Renaud
- 5 August 1992: Emerson, Lake and Palmer
- 21 August 1992 - 22 August 1992: Céline Dion

==== 1996-1997 ====
- 12 July 1996: Kevin Parent
- 15 June 1997: Steve Vai - Michel Cusson - Joe Satriani
- 12 July 1997: Moist - Okoumé - Autour de Lucie
- 21 July 1997: The Offspring
- 9 August 1997: Les Colocs

==== 1998 ====
- 3 July 1998: Colin James et Jimmie Vaughan
- 4 July 1998: Johnny Winter
- 5 July 1998: Iron Maiden, Dio et W.A.S.P.
- 17 August 1998: Deep Purple, Emerson, Lake and Palmer et Dream Theater
- 21 August 1998: Joe Cocker
- 29 August 1998: Moist, Our Lady Peace, I Mother Earth, Esthero
- 4 September 1998: Slayer - Fear Factory - Kilgore

==== 1999 ====
- 14 July 1999: Iron Maiden - Voivod
- 30 July 1999: Roger Waters
- 1 August 1999:The Offspring - The Dickies - Lit

=== 2000s ===
==== 2000-2001 ====
- 2 April 2000: Millencolin
- 21 July 2000: 3 Doors Down
- 25 July 2000: Jethro Tull - Joe Bonamassa
- 22 August 2001: Papa Roach - The step kings
- 15 August 2001: Treble Charger
- 31 August 2001: Sevendust - Drowning Pool- Finger Eleven

==== 2002 ====
- 4 July 2002: Dio - Voivod
- 10 August 2002: Bob Dylan
- 26 August 2002: Supertramp
- 1 September 2002: Dream Theater and Joe Satriani - King's X
- 3 September 2002: Slayer - In Flames - Soulfly - Downthesun
- 12 September 2002: Filter

==== 2003 ====
- 6 July 2003: Dream Theater - Queensrÿche - Fates Warning
- 24 July 2003: George Thorogood -
- 8 August 2003: Def Leppard
- 26 August 2003: Live
- 18 September 2003: Sum 41 - Yellowcard

==== 2004 ====
- 14 June 2004: Slayer - Damageplan
- 18 June 2004: Reel Big Fish - Catch 22 - Big D and the Kids Table - Rx Bandits - Lucky Boys Confusion
- 19 June 2004: IAM
- 21 June 2004: The Darkness - The Wildhearts
- 16 July 2004: Shinedown
- 25 July 2004: Alice Cooper - Edgar Winter
- 11 August 2004: Deep Purple
- 14 August 2004: Pink Floyd Experience
- 17 August 2004: Dream Theater - Yes
- 1 September 2004: Sum 41

==== 2005 ====
- 11 June 2005: No Use for a Name - Bigwig - Silverstein
- 27 June 2005: NOFX - Good Riddance - Against Me!
- 11 July 2005: 3 Doors Down - Staind
- 28 July 2005: George Thorogood and the Destroyers
- 29 July 2005: Styx and Saga
- 8 August 2005: Alexisonfire - The Used - Underoath - Day of Contempt
- 26 August 2005: Billy Idol and Bif Naked - Priestess
- 8 September 2005: Alexisonfire - The Used

==== 2009 ====
- 1 June 2009:Disturbed - All That Remains - Skindred - Art of Dying
- 17 June 2009: Rise Against - Rancid - The Riverboat Gamblers
- 11 August 2009: Dream Theater - Zappa Plays Zappa - Scale the Summit - Bigelf

=== 2010s ===
==== 2010-2011 ====
- 20 August 2010: Green Day - AFI
- 4 September 2010: Three Days Grace - Crash Karma - These Silent Waves
- 4 June 2011: Deep Purple
- 15 June 2011: Supertramp
- 18 August 2011: Seether - These Silent Waves
- 30 September 2011: Rise Against
- 30 September 2011: Flogging Molly - The Black Pacific

==== 2012 ====
- 20 June 2012: Yanni
- 21 June 2012: Avenged Sevenfold - Halestorm
- 29 July 2012: Monster Truck - Slash
- 11 September 2012: Rise Against - The Gaslight Anthem - Hot Water Music

==== 2019 ====
- 30 August 2019: Dennis DeYoung
- 31 August 2019: Limp Bizkit
- 1 September 2019: Souldia

=== 2020s ===
==== 2022-2023 ====
- 30 June 2022: Le Rêve du Diable - Québec Redneck Bluegrass Project - Groovy Aardvark
- 31 July 2022: A Day to Remember - Beartooth - The Ghost Inside - Bad Omens
- 17 September 2022 - Festival Envol and Macadam with: NOFX, The Hunters, Nobro, Mute
- 28 May 2023: Milky Chance
- 16 June 2023: Paul Piché
- 10 August 2023: Mammoth WVH
- 11 August 2023: Alter Bridge - Sevendust
- 16 August 2023: Elvis Experience with Martin Fontaine
- 22 August 2023: The Australian Pink Floyd Show
- 31 August 2023: Franco fête 2023
- 1 September 2023: Gims
- 7-8 September 2023: Charlotte Cardin
- Festival Envol and Macadam, 15-16 September
  - 15 September 2023 - No Face, No Case, Hate it too, Dance Laury Dance, Groovy Aardvark, Mononc' Serge and Anonymus
  - 16 September 2023 - Crachat, Don't try, MAP, Big D and the Kids Table, Agnostic Front, Rancid

==== 2024 ====
- 25 May 2024: Styx
- 15 June 2024: The Australian Pink Floyd Show
- 16 June 2024: Francis Cabrel
- 21 June 2024: Festival Kwé!: Meeting the Indigenous Peoples
- 22 June 2024: Royal 22e Régiment: A tribute to the heroes
- 24 June 2024: Bodh'aktan and Le Rêve du diable
- 27 June 2024: Boogie Wonder Band
- 9 July 2024: Ziggy Alberts - New Love
- 25 July 2024: New World Men: hommage a Rush - Led Zepplica: tribute to Led Zeppelin
- 26 July 2024: Night Fever: hommage aux Bee Gees - Abbamania: tribute to ABBA
- 27 July 2024: So - Projet Gabriel: tribute to Peter Gabriel - Martin Levac: tribute to Phil Collins and Genesis
- 28 July 2024: Premier Ciel: tribute to Harmonium - Dreamer: tribute to Supertramp
- 2 August 2024: Tous dans le même bateau: a benefit show for Maison Lauberiviere
- 8 August 2024: PUP - Sum 41 - Show and Canadian tour cancelled by Sum 41 due to injury to a band member.
- 9 August 2024: Loud - As part of the Cigale Festival - Show cancelled due to weather forecast
- 10 August 2024: The Man in Black: a tribute to Johnny Cash
- 1 September 2024: Sean Paul
- 6 September 2024: Talk
- 21 September 2024: Bad Religion - "show cancelled due to unforeseen family circumstances"
- Festival Envol and Macadam, 13-14 September 2024
  - 13 September 2024: Rope Skills - The Real McKenzies - The Bouncing Souls - Gorilla Biscuits - The Hives
  - 14 September 2024: Taxi Girls - Fall From Everest - Conservative Military Image - Cro-Mags - Raised Fist - Dropkick Murphys
- 22 September 2024: Dadju et Tayc

==== 2025 ====
- 21 May 2025: Cypress Hill - De La Soul - The Pharcyde
- 13 June 2025: Daniel Bélanger
- 14 June 2025: James Blunt
- 20 June 2025: Orloge Simard
- 22 June 2025: Alain Souchon - Ours Souchon - Pierre Souchon - Show cancelled on 28 May 2025.
- 26 June 2025: ZZ Top - The Wallflowers
- 27 June 2025: Québec Redneck Bluegrass Project - Galaxie
- 22 July 2025: Papa Roach
- Nostalgie Québec Music Festival, 24-27 July 2025
  - 24 July 2025: Les Souverains improductifs (tribute to Les Colocs) - Sound of Sting (tribute to Sting and The Police).
  - 25 July 2025: Les Caveners (tribute to The Beatles) - Les Blushing Brides (hommage à The Rolling Stones).
  - 26 July 2025: Sandman (tribute to Metallica) - 21 Gun Salute (tribute to AC/DC).
  - 27 July 2025: Listen to the music (tribute to The Doobie Brothers) - Fleetwood Mac Mania (tribute to Fleetwood Mac).
- 2 August 2025: Rock Story & friends - show featured Jean Ravel, Andie Duquette, France D'Amour, Breen LeBoeuf, Bruno Pelletier, Martin Fontaine, Geneviève Jodoin, Elyzabeth Diaga.
- 15 August 2025: The Summer of My Songs. Show featured Damien Robitaille, Ariane Moffatt, Michel Rivard, Pierre Lapointe, Mara Tremblay, Ariane Roy, Lou-Adriane Cassidy, Lydia Képinski, Les Louanges, Naomi, Pierre Kwenders, MOn Doux Saigneur, Fredz, Rau ze, Matiu
- 20 August 2025: Notre-Dame de Paris: the 25th anniversary event. Show featured: Garou, Daniel Lavoie, Bruno Pelletier, Patrick Fiori, Hélène Ségara, Julie Zenatti, Natasha St-Pier, Richard Cocciante.
- 25 August 2025: The grand Francophonie concert celebrates Jean-Jacques Goldman. The show featured Louis-Jean Cormier, France D'Amour, Garou, Daniel Lavoie, Roch Voisine, Salvatore Adamo, Patrick Fiori, Mentissa, Michel Fugain, Pierre Lapointe
- 28 August 2025: Marie-Mai
- 30 August 2025: Vance Joy - Fortunates Ones
- 6 September 2025: Pink Martini
- Festival Envol et Macadam, 11-13 September 2025
  - 11 September 2025: Evening of shows with GFK, Martyr, Get the Shot et Voivod, Mononc' Serge and Anonymus.
  - 12 September 2025: Evening of shows with Béton Armé, le Gagnant Planetrox Europe, Face to Face, Pennywise
  - 13 September 2025: Evening of shows with The Robert’s Creek Saloon, The Anti-Queens, The Planet Smashers, Streetlight Manifesto, The Interrupters.
- 28 September 2025: The Australian Pink Floyd Show

==== 2026 ====
- 23 May 2026: Sara Dufour
- 6 June 2026: Zagata - Rafaëlle Roy - Jonathan Roy
- 26 June 2026: Dominique Hudson with special guests Christian-Marc Gendron, Sara Dufour, Mario Pelchat,
- 27 June 2026: Headpins - Honeymoon Suite
- 3 July 2026: Gregory Charles
- 4 July 2026: NPSW - Professional Wrestling Gala
- 8 July 2026: Camp d'été 123PUNK with Silverstein, Bigwig, Sudden Waves, Peer Pressure, WAG
- 24 July 2026: Boogie Wonderband
- 25 July 2026: Kaleo - Geoffroy
- 1 August 2026: Lilypita - Bunt
- 7 August 2026: Aldo Nova - Quiet Riot
- 8 August 2026: Luis & Manu: hommage à Nirvana - L'intégrale de Unplugged in NY.
- 17 August 2026: Super FrancoFête: L'été de mes chansons avec Lisa LeBlanc, Sarahmée, Rau Ze, Robert Robert, Alex Burger, Lumière, Kinjioo, Joseph Sarenhes, Louis-Julien Durso and plus autres invités.
- 19 August 2026: Super FrancoFête: Piaf Symphonique with Isabelle Boulay
- 21 August 2026: Super FrancoFête: La veillée électro with Monsieur PY, Dubmatique, Karine Sansregret, Mitsou, Ya Cetidon.
- 22 August 2026: Super FrancoFête: Loud: Carte blanche
- 25 August 2026: Super FrancoFête: Le Grand concert de la francophonie animé par Garou and Cyril Féraud et leurs invités: Nana Mouskouri, Bruno Pelletier, MC Solaar, Diane Dufresne, Isabelle Boulay, Shy'm, Jérémy Frerot, Véronic DiCaire, Mentissa, La Compagnie créole, Ambre Jadah, Ycare et plusieurs autres invités.
- 27 August 2026: Polo & Pan - Midnight Generation
- 5 September 2026: Parabolus: tribute to Tool - Sacred Silence: tribute to System of a Down
- Festival Envol et Macadam, 10-12 September 2026
  - 10 September 2026: Penny & The Pits - DVTR - Orloge Simard - Les Goules
  - 11 September 2026: Drop Out Cold - Luther - Vader - Despised Icon - Hatebreed
  - 12 September 2026: General Chaos - Guttermouth - Cross Dog - A Wilhelm Scream - Mute - Satanic Surfers - Teenage Bottlerocket - Bad Religion
- 18 September 2026: RuPaul

== See also ==
- List of theatres and performance venues in Quebec City

=== External ===
- Media related to Agora du Vieux-Port at Wikimedia Commons
