= Bande à part (radio station) =

Canadian radio show and satellite radio station

- Canada
- Broadcast area: Worldwide on the Internet; Canada & Contiguous United States on Sirius Satellite Radio
- Frequency: Sirius 87

Programming
- Language: French
- Format: indie music

Ownership
- Owner: Canadian Broadcasting Corporation

History
- First air date: 2000 on the Internet; 1 December 2005 on Sirius
- Last air date: May 2013

Links
- Website: bandeapart.fm

Bande à part was the name of a website, a radio show on Radio-Canada and Sirius Satellite Radio station in Canada, active from 1996 to 2013, that were devoted primarily to French Canadian arts and music.

Operated by the Société Radio-Canada (SRC), Bande à part was the French counterpart to CBC Radio 3. Bande à part also broadcast on Sirius Satellite Radio channel 87. Some of its content also aired as a late-night program on Espace musique, and the service produced a weekly podcast and several Internet radio streams, each devoted to a particular genre of music.

The service was discontinued in May 2013, with its content and staff integrated into espace.mu, Radio-Canada's online music streaming service. Its space on Sirius XM was taken over by Sonica, an adult album alternative stream produced by CBC Music. At the same time, two new channels, Influence Franco and Attitude Franco, launched to broadcast artists who had been part of Bande à part's playlist. Several past staffers of the station went on to create parlabande.fm, an unaffiliated music blog which seeks to serve as a promotional venue for independent music in Quebec.

== Roots ==
Like its counterpart CBC Radio 3, Bande à part had roots in radio programming that predated widespread use of either the internet or satellite radio. It originally aired as a national radio program devoted to francophone alternative music, airing from Radio-Canada's studios in Moncton.

In the late 1990s, the CBC announced tentative plans to open a third radio network, devoted to youth culture. Although the original radio network proposal was abandoned, the CBC launched Radio 3 as a pilot project through its new media division in 2000, and Bande à part followed in early 2001. In the fall of 2001, Bande à part also produced a short run television series, bandeapart.tv, for ARTV.

In 2004, Bande à part began airing on Espace musique in a weekend timeslot. The network launched its podcast in 2005, a few months after the debut of Radio 3's podcast.

Both Radio 3 and Bande à part became satellite radio stations with the launch of Sirius Canada in December 2005. The station aired on Sirius 93 from its launch until June 24, 2008, when it moved to Sirius 87 as part of a major realignment of the Sirius lineup.

== Programming ==
Personalities associated with the network included Catherine Pogonat, Alexandre Bernard, Alexandre Courteau, Yuani Fragata, Élodie Gagnon, François Lemay, Natalie Poirier, Claude Rajotte and Tony Tremblay. Courteau, Fragata and Gagnon also made occasional appearances on Radio 3 as band interviewers or correspondents promoting the Quebec music scene for English listeners.

The network primarily aired francophone music, although some English Canadian and international music aired as well. The network aired a freeform mix of rock, pop, folk, hip hop, punk and electronic music — however, because Montreal has a particularly prominent electronic and post-rock music scene, Bande à part's playlist leaned somewhat more toward experimental genres than Radio 3's.

In January 2011, the network celebrated its tenth anniversary with a twelve-hour marathon broadcast featuring live performances by Mara Tremblay, Mononc' Serge, Xavier Caféïne and Jimmy Hunt.

== Concerts ==
The network also sometimes sponsored concerts.

Tour Tournée in the winter of 2006, jointly sponsored by CBC Radio 3 and Bande à part, included bands such as Wintersleep, Two Hours Traffic, Konflit Dramatik, Hexes and Ohs, Great Aunt Ida, Shout Out Out Out Out, Novillero, Les Breastfeeders, SS Cardiacs, Les Dales Hawerchuk, Pony Up! and The Deadly Snakes. Each of the eight locations had a different lineup of predominantly local bands.

On March 24, 2006, the network staged a fifth anniversary show at the Spectrum in Montreal, featuring Les Dale Hawerchuk, Akido, Karkwa and Malajube.

On October 1, 2006, Radio 3 and Bande à part again jointly sponsored See Vous Play, a show in Toronto featuring Les Breastfeeders, Emily Haines and the Soft Skeleton, Les Trois Accords and The Joel Plaskett Emergency.

On April 27, 2007, Bande à part and CBC Radio 3 jointly presented Quebec Scene, an Ottawa concert featuring The Stills, The Besnard Lakes, Karkwa and Mahjor Bidet.

== Collaborative music projects ==
In 2007, the network was also involved in several collaborative music projects.

=== Vauvandalou ===
In 2007, Bande à part gathered a number of Quebec rock musicians for a one-off supergroup single. The group, Vauvandalou, consisted of Fred Fortin of Les Breastfeeders, Simon Proulx of Les Trois Accords, Jean-Philippe Fréchette of Navet Confit and Vincent Peake of Groovy Aardvark. The single, "0.99$", debuted on Bande à part's podcast, and its video debuted on SRC Television's Le Fric Show.

The band has not produced or released any further collaborations.

=== 93 tours ===
In the fall of 2007, Bande à part worked with 27 unsigned hip hop musicians from Quebec to produce the compilation album 93 tours. Each of the album's nine tracks features different rappers collaborating with producers Mash, Boogat and DJ Horg. The album was distributed as a free download from Bande à part's website. Several of the musicians involved in the project went on to form the musical collective Alaclair Ensemble.

1. Anodajay, Imposs, Samian and SP, "93 tours"
2. Karim Ouellet and Maybe Watson, "Malice au pays des merveilles"
3. Cheak 13, Confus and Paranoize, "Courir de gauche à droite"
4. Dialekt, D-Track and Sola, "Hors du temps"
5. Ale Dee, Koriass and Nino Malo, "Tout le monde descend"
6. Malkay, Prolific and Tatou, "Mémoire"
7. Dramatik, Boogat and Monk-E, "Résistance spirituelle"
8. Webster, Eman and KenLo, "Mouvements"
9. Dupuis, Radical and Shauit, "D'ici ou d'ailleurs"
