= Navet Confit =

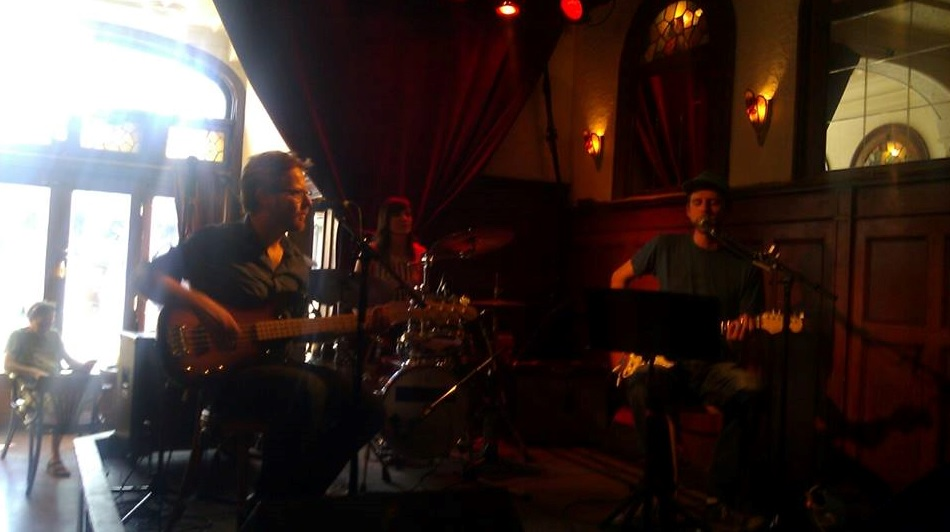

Background information
- Origin: Montreal, Quebec, Canada
- Genres: indie rock
- Years active: 2001–present
- Labels: Dry and Dead, La Confiserie, P572
- Members: Jean-Philippe Fréchette
- Website: navetconfit.com

Navet Confit is a Canadian indie rock band featuring musician Jean-Philippe Fréchette. He has released music through his own label La Confiserie, and La Meute.

== Career ==
Originally from the Beauce region of Quebec and based in Montreal, he has released seven albums and three EPs on the independent record labels Dry and Dead and La Confiserie. In 2006 he released his first album, LP1. He also released the 24 track double album LP2 that featured contributions by Fred Fortin, Carl-Éric Hudon, Émilie Proulx, Vincent Peake, Polipe et Jeremi Mourand. The album was nominated for an ADISQ award in 2008.

In 2013 he signed with the label La Meute and released the album Bestove. Live he performs with the Dauphins Vampires, which consists of Alex Champigny (guitars/keyboards), Carl-Éric Hudon (bass) and Lydia Champagne (drums).

In 2007, he also collaborated with Fred Fortin of Les Breastfeeders, Simon Proulx of Les Trois Accords and Vincent Peake of Groovy Aardvark in the supergroup Vauvandalou, who released the one-off single "0.99$" through Bande à part and Radio-Canada's Le Fric Show.

In 2016 he provided the sound design for the theatre production Yukon Style.

The name translates as candied turnip.

== Discography ==
=== EPs ===
- EP1, 2004
- EP2, 2005
- EP3, 2006
- EP4, 2006
- EP5/Platitude Confortable, 2009

=== Albums ===
- LP1, 2006
- LP2, 2007
- LP3/ papier-vampire, 2009
- LP4/ La vérité sur Noël, 2006
- Bestove, 2013
- LP5/Thérapie, 2013
- LOL (2015)
- Magasin de mannequins (2016)
- Minneapolis Normcore Karaoke Mixtape, 2016
- Engagement, Lutte, Clan et Respect, 2019
- Navet Confit Présente Le Justin Trudeau Kinda Party, 2019
- Monsieur Confit Au Théatre Vol.1 / Nyotaimori, 2020
- Bonjour, 2022
- Désolé mouvement geste, 2024
