= Water on Mars (band) =

- Origin: Quebec City, Quebec, Canada
- Genres: Rock, electronic
- Years active: 2004–2009
- Label: Statik Records
- Members: Philippe Navarro; Benoit L'Allier; Sylvain Harvey

Water on Mars is a psychedelic rock and electronic music group from Quebec City, founded in 2004. The music trio is led by Philippe Navarro, guitarist, vocalist, arranger, producer, principal lyricist, and music composer. He is joined by drummer Sylvain Harvey and bassist Benoit L'Allier,

== History ==
Navarro was born in Labrador City, Newfoundland, Canada, and spent his childhood in a mining town, where the bare landscapes and expansive skies were a source of inspiration. He taught himself to play guitar, building his first electric guitar from a parts of a tape recorder. In 1978, he traveled south, obtaining a post-graduate degree in political science from Université Laval, after which be became a speechwriter for the government of Quebec and the Parti Québécois. He also worked for opposition leader André Boisclair, and published many op-ed pieces in the Montreal newspapers, including a final piece meant as a symbolic act of political hara-kiri, in which he took a stand against his boss on the day he announced his candidacy for the party leadership.

From 1999 through 1997, Navarro pursued his career as guitarist from Bathurst New Brunswick to Vancouver, exploring North American music in bands such as Jake and the Snakes (Blues rock), Aon (Celtic), and Anasazi (Funk/Prog). He was a busker, jammed with bluesman Carl Tremblay and played with Silence, Quebec's longest-running Pink Floyd tribute band. In 2001, Navarro recorded his first album, Stereo. Benoit L'Allier, late of the band Tuesday as Usual (and son of Quebec City's long-time mayor Jean-Paul L'Allier), played acoustic guitar and electric bass on the album. Navarro and l'Allier also made a short film, Route 389, on the theme of the Nordic experience (the song Trois-89 opens the film).

In September 2002, Navarro and l'Allier were joined by drummer Sylvain Harvey, who had been with the band Les Fantaisistes, and who was President of the 2002 Quebec Winter Carnival. The three formed Water on Mars, with a focus on electronic music.

== 2004 - Mannah ==
In the spring of 2004, they released their first album, Mannah, a blend of space rock, techno-funk and post-rock instrumental eyeing on trip hop, spiced with drum loops and samplings squeezed between eerie tracks. It was released in Canada by Statik Records; in August 2005, it was released in Japan by Plop. Mannah, which was recorded in a church on analog equipment before digital editing and mixing, garnered critical acclaim, notably at (French) CBC/Radio Canada, where all 11 pieces were broadcast. Over half of the tracks ended up on the playlists of Catherine Pogonat, Alexandre Courteau, and DJ Claude Rajotte.

Following the album's release, Water On Mars played live shows with DJ Raphaël Simard, keyboardist William Croft (Québecissime), saxophonist Lyne Goulet (Interférences Sardines), and flutist Anna Kowalczyk. Water on Mars also podcasted the single "Rojo y Blanco" ("Red and White"), a Latin dance song with lyrics inspired by the opera Carmen.

Water on Mars also played the opening show for the Ice Hotel (Quebec), where two cocktails were named after the Mannah tracks "Earth Juice" and "Sensual Confusion".

== 2007 - Delta ==
On January 22, 2007, Water on Mars released its second album, Delta. It is announced as a new mutation of the group's increasingly complex electronic music. Conceptualized with the help of philosopher Sophie-Jan Arrien, the album explores the myth of Faust and revisits the crossroads where Robert Johnson sold his soul to the devil to acquire knowledge of the urban blues.

Other musicians who took part in the recording of Delta were soprano Sabrina Ferland, DJ Raphaël Simard, folk singer Judith Perron, and Daniel Gaudreault (Rhodes piano), Dominique Paré (Minimoog), Lyne Goulet (saxophone), Anna Kowalczyk (flute) and Marie-Ève Legendre (backing vocals).

Delta obtained critical success. The track "Gizeh" hit number one on Bandeapart.fm's interactive charts, and number 5 on the Baromètre charts (Quebec indy radio network). "Gizeh" appeared on the compilation CD of DJ Marco G, and "Ole Man" was included in the compilation CD Québec Émergent 2007 as well as on the TEA South yearly compilation.

Excellent reviews of Delta came from DJ Claude Rajotte of Radio-Canada, Réjean Beaucage, of Voir Magazine, Isabelle Bédard-Brûlé of Impact-Campus, who wrote that Delta is an album "to discover for its organic vision of electro, that goes to the end of the possibilities". The Journal de Québec said that Delta has "a clear genius for a concise, discrete, and efficient adaptation of some of the best pages of psychedelic garage rock...Our choice of the week". According to poet and critic Tony Tremblay of Bandeapart.fm, "That's Delta : a strange psychedelic trek in a sweet and intense musical dream. Water on Mars played the 2007 Festival d'été de Québec. At the 2007 ADISQ awards, Delta was nominated for Electronic Music Album of the Year.

== 2009 - Labrador Skyline ==
In 2009, Water on Mars released their third album, Labrador Skyline. By now, Sylvain Harvey had left the band; drums on this album were played by Marco Grenier.

In 2017, the Navarro songs "Noosphère Blues" and "Anticlérical Funk" were included in Les Disques Passeport's compilation CD Remixer le Québec.
