= Fred Fortin =

Canadian rock singer-songwriter

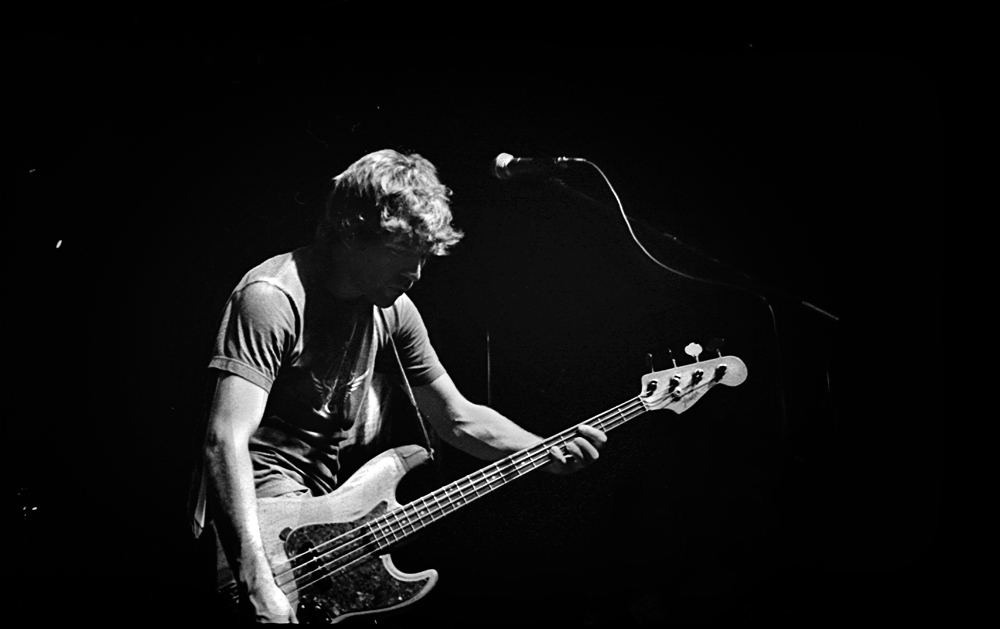

Background information
- Born: Joseph Antoine Frédéric Fortin Perron; 5 May 1971 (age 55); Dolbeau-Mistassini, Quebec, Canada
- Genres: Indie rock, garage rock, folk rock
- Instruments: Guitar, bass guitar, drums, harmonica
- Years active: 1996–present
- Labels: C4, Musi-Art, Grosse Boîte
- Formerly of: Galaxie; Gros Mené; Les Breastfeeders
- Website: www.fredfortin.qc.ca

Fred Fortin (born Joseph Antoine Frédéric Fortin Perron on 5 May 1971 in Dolbeau-Mistassini, Quebec) is a Canadian rock singer-songwriter. Formerly associated with the bands Galaxie, Gros Mené and Les Breastfeeders, he has also released several solo albums. His 2009 album Plastrer la lune was a longlisted nominee for the 2010 Polaris Music Prize.

In 2007, he also collaborated with Jean-Philippe Fréchette of Navet Confit, Simon Proulx of Les Trois Accords and Vincent Peake of Groovy Aardvark in the supergroup Vauvandalou, who released the one-off single "0.99$" through Bande à part and Radio-Canada's Le Fric Show.

== Discography ==
- 1996: Joseph Antoine Frédéric Fortin Perron
- 2000: Le Plancher des vaches
- 2004: Planter le décor
- 2009: Plastrer la lune
- 2016: Ultramarr
- 2019: Microdose

=== With Gros Mené ===
- 1999: Tue ce drum Pierre Bouchard
- 2012: Agnus Dei
- 2022: Pax et Bonum
