= Mongeau =

Mongeau (pronounced [mɔ̃ʒo]) is a French-language surname. Notable people with the name include:

- Claude Mongeau, Canadian railroad executive
- France Mongeau (born 1961), Canadian educator and poet
- Michel Mongeau (ice hockey) (1965–2010), Canadian ice hockey player
- Michel Mongeau (actor) (c. 1946–2020), Canadian actor
- Serge Mongeau (born 1937), Canadian physician, writer, publisher and politician
- Tana Mongeau (born 1998), American Internet personality and model
