= Marlène Belley =

Canadian poet (born 1963)

Marlène Belley (born 1963) is a Canadian poet.

She was born in Saint-Hyacinthe, Quebec and went on to teach French in Ottawa. Her first collection of poetry Les jours sont trop longs pour se mentir, published in 1995, received the Prix Émile-Nelligan in the same year.
