= Mahjor Bidet =

Canadian indie rock band

Mahjor Bidet was a Canadian indie rock group from Montreal, Quebec, in the 2000s, best known for their single "Painful Love".

A collaboration between singer-songwriter Serge-André Amin and multi-instrumentalist Renaud Bastien of Malajube, the band's music blended guitar rock with electronic elements. Other musicians contributing to their recordings included Chantal Boulais on keyboards and vocals, Alexandre Gauthier on bass, and Vincent Gagné-Lacombe on drums and percussion, with guitarist Robert Tétrault and drummer Daniel Bédard accompanying Amin and Bastien for live shows.

In September 2006, they released a self-titled EP. "Painful Love" broke through when it reached #1 on CISM-FM, before gaining wider airplay on mainstream radio. In October, they played at the Pop Montreal festival, where they were in competition for the Prix Relève for best new artist performing at the festival.

They followed up in 2007 with the album La vie qui fitte avec la tapisserie.

On April 27, 2007, they played on the bill at Quebec Scene, an Ottawa concert jointly sponsored by CBC Radio 3 and Bande à part which also featured The Stills, The Besnard Lakes, and Karkwa. Later the same year they performed at both the Francouvertes and the Francofolies.

They did not release any further recordings as Mahjor Bidet, although Amin and Bastien continued to collaborate under the band names Tako Tsubo and Sergeant Dreamin. Bastien has also been a member of Cœur de pirate's backing band.

== Discography ==
- Mahjor Bidet - 2006
- La vie qui fitte avec la tapisserie - 2007
