= Déjeuner sur l'herbe (album) =

Studio album by Les Breastfeeders
- Released: 4 May 2004
- Recorded: 2004
- Genre: Garage rock-yé-yé
- Label: Blow The Fuse

Les Breastfeeders chronology
Déjeuner sur l'herbe (2004)	Les matins de grands soirs (2006)

Professional ratings
Review scores
Source	Rating
Allmusic	3.5/5 stars

Déjeuner sur l'herbe (Lunch on the lawn) is the debut album by Québécois rock band Les Breastfeeders. The album was released 4 May 2004 by Blow The Fuse Records.

== Track listing ==
1. Mini Jupe et Watusi
2. J'pourrais pas vivre avec toi
3. Laisse autant le vent tout emporter
4. Angle mort
5. Hé-Hé
6. Amoureux Solitaires
7. Ostrogoth-à-Gogo
8. L'existence précède la diésel
9. Y a rien à faire
10. Ça ira
11. Vanille ou fraise dans la steppe
12. Misérats
13. Concerto pour rien du tout
