= Prix Émile-Nelligan =

The Prix Émile-Nelligan is a literary award given annually by the Fondation Émile-Nelligan to a North American French language poet under the age of 35. It was named in honour of the Quebec poet Émile Nelligan and was first awarded in 1979, the 100th anniversary of his birth.

== Recipients ==
- 1979 - François Charron, Blessures
- 1980 - Claude Beausoleil, Au milieu du corps l’attraction s’insinue (poèmes 1975–1980)
- 1981 - Jean-Yves Collette, La Mort d’André Breton
- 1982 - Jocelyne Felx, Orpailleuse / Philippe Haeck - La Parole verte
- 1983 - Lucien Francœur, Les Rockeurs sanctifiés
- 1984 - Normand de Bellefeuille, Le Livre du devoir
- 1985 - Anne-Marie Alonzo, Bleus de mine
- 1986 - Carole David, Terroristes d’amour / France Mongeau - Lumières
- 1987 - Michael Delisle, Fontainebleau / Élise Turcotte - La voix de Carla
- 1988 - Renaud Longchamps, Légendes suivi de Sommation sur l’histoire
- 1989 - Élise Turcotte, La Terre est ici
- 1990 - Claude Paré, Chemins de sel
- 1991 - Rachel Leclerc, Les Vies frontalières
- 1992 - Serge Patrice Thibodeau, Le Cycle de Prague
- 1993 - Martin-Pierre Tremblay, Le Plus Petit Désert
- 1994 - Monique Deland, Géants dans l’île
- 1995 - Marlène Belley, Les jours sont trop longs pour se mentir
- 1996 - Carle Coppens, Poèmes contre la montre
- 1997 - Patrick Lafontaine, L’Ambition du vide
- 1998 - Tony Tremblay, Rue Pétrole-Océan
- 1999 - Jean-Éric Riopel, Papillons réfractaires
- 2000 - Tania Langlais, Douze bêtes aux chemises de l'homme
- 2001 - Mathieu Boily, Le grand respir
- 2002 - Benoît Jutras, Nous serons sans voix
- 2003 - Jean-Simon DesRochers, Parle seul
- 2004 - Kim Doré, Le rayonnement des corps noirs
- 2005 - Renée Gagnon, Des fois que je tombe
- 2006 - Maude Smith Gagnon, Une tonne d'air
- 2007 - Danny Plourde, calme aurore (s'unir ailleurs, du napalm plein l'œil)
- 2008 - Catherine Lalonde, Corps étranger
- 2009 - François Turcot, Cette maison n'est pas la mienne
- 2010 - Philippe More, Le laboratoire des anges
- 2011 - Mahigan Lepage, Relief
- 2012 - Mario Brassard, Le livre clairière
- 2013 - Michaël Trahan, Nœud coulant
- 2014 - Roxanne Desjardins, Ciseaux
- 2015 - Rosalie Lessard, L'observatoire
- 2016 - Jonathan Lamy, La vie sauve
- 2017 - François Guerrette, Constellation des grands brûlés
- 2018 - Jonathan Charette, Ravissement à perpétuité
- 2019 - Laurence Veilleux, Elle des chambres
