= Les matins de grands soirs =

Studio album by Les Breastfeeders
- Released: 15 August 2006
- Recorded: 2006
- Genre: Garage rock-yé-yé
- Label: Blow the Fuse

Les Breastfeeders chronology
Déjeuner sur l'herbe (2004)	Les matins de grands soirs (2006)

Professional ratings
Review scores
Source	Rating
AllMusic	link
PopMatters	link
Harp	(not rated) link
Star Pulse	link

Les matins de grands soirs is the second album by Québécois rock band Les Breastfeeders. The album was released 15 August 2006 by Blow the Fuse Records.

== Track listing ==
1. "Viens avec moi"
2. "Chanson pour destinée"
3. "Funny Funiculaire"
4. "Tout va pour le mieux dans le pire des mondes"
5. "Da-Di-Dam"
6. "Et j'apprendrai que c'est l'hiver"
7. "En dansant le Yah!"
8. "Pas sans saveur"
9. "Le roi est nu"
10. "Qui a deux femmes"
11. "Où allez-vous si vite?"
12. "Tuer l'idole"
13. "Tu n'es pas mon chien"
14. "Septembre sous la pluie"
