= Chants d'Épuration =

Studio album by Plume Latraverse
- Released: 2003

Chants d'épuration is a 2003 album by Canadian songwriter Plume Latraverse.

== Track listing ==
1. Le lapin reproducteur
2. Angélatine
3. Érosion éolienne (...et chapeau moral)
4. Le kayak rouge
5. Écholalie (qu'est-ce qui?)
6. Blouse d'automne
7. Le vaste monde (la vie nous rattrape)
8. Beau filon!
9. Turlupinades
10. L'intolérable intolérant
11. La traversée du dessert
12. Sans nommer d'nom
13. Épuration extrème
14. Black out! (sans queue ni tête)
15. Méli-mélopée
16. Aquarelle
17. Le coeur de l'action

featuring Louise Forestier on vocals
