= Maude Smith Gagnon =

Canadian poet

- Born: 1980 (age 45–46); Basse-Côte-Nord region, Quebec, Canada
- Education: Université du Québec à Montréal
- Occupation: Poet

Maude Smith Gagnon (born 1980) is a Québec poet.

She was born in the Basse-Côte-Nord region of Québec and studied at the Université du Québec à Montréal. Her first collection of poetry Une tonne d’air was awarded the Prix Émile-Nelligan in 2006. Her collection of poems Un drap. Une place received the Governor General's Award for French-language poetry in 2012.
