= L'homme qui me ressemble =

Studio album by Damien Robitaille
- Released: 2006
- Genre: Pop rock
- Label: Audiogram

L'homme qui me ressemble (The Man Who Resembles Me) is the first full-length album by Franco-Ontarian musician Damien Robitaille.

== Track listing ==
1. Mètres de mon être
2. Je tombe
3. Cercles
4. Rouge-gorge
5. Voyeur planétaire
6. L'homme qui me ressemble
7. Tous les sujets sont tabous
8. Mon atlas
9. Astronaute
10. Amnésie sélective
11. Porc-épic
12. Électrique
13. Sexy séparatiste
14. Dans l'horizon je vois l'aube
