= Sunny Duval =

Canadian rock guitarist

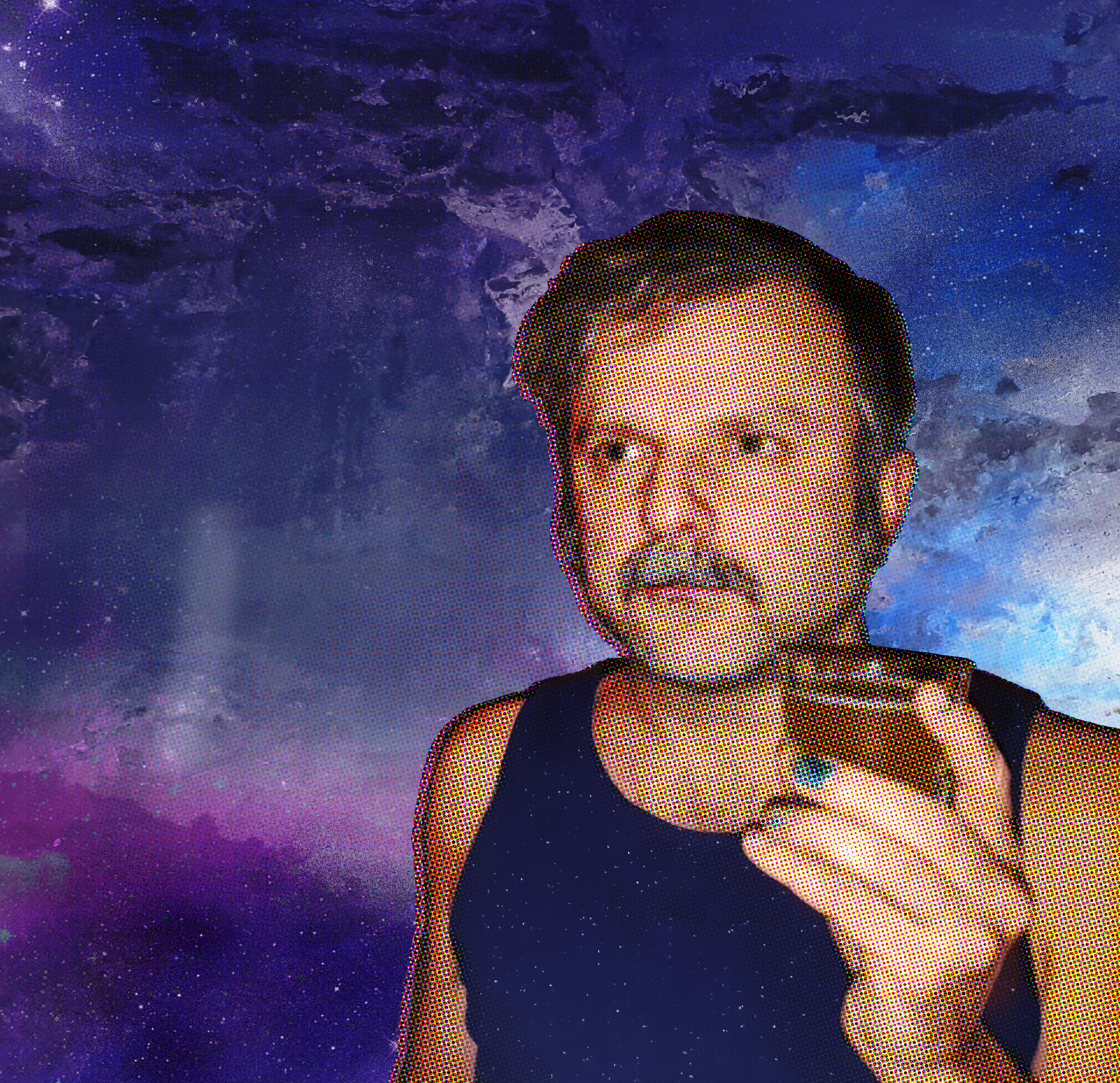
- Sunny Duval in 2021

Background information
- Genres: Garage rock
- Instruments: Vocals; guitar
- Years active: 1991–present
- Labels: Bonsound; Proxenett; Big Fat Truck; Blow the Fuse
- Website: sunnyduval.com

François "Sunny" Duval is a Canadian rock guitarist and songwriter. He has been associated with the band Les Breastfeeders. He has also performed as "Pierre Rival" in the duo Les Freres Rivaux with Damien Robitaille ("Michel Rival").

Under his own name, he has produced four albums. His 2010 album Sein Noir, Sein Blanc won the award for best rock and roll album at the 2010 GAMIQ (Gala Alternatif de la Musique Indépendante du Québec) Awards.

== Discography ==
=== Albums ===
- Achigan (2005)
- Sein Noir, Sein Blanc (2010)
- Amour d'amour (2013)
- New wave de plage (2016)
