= Lucien Francoeur =

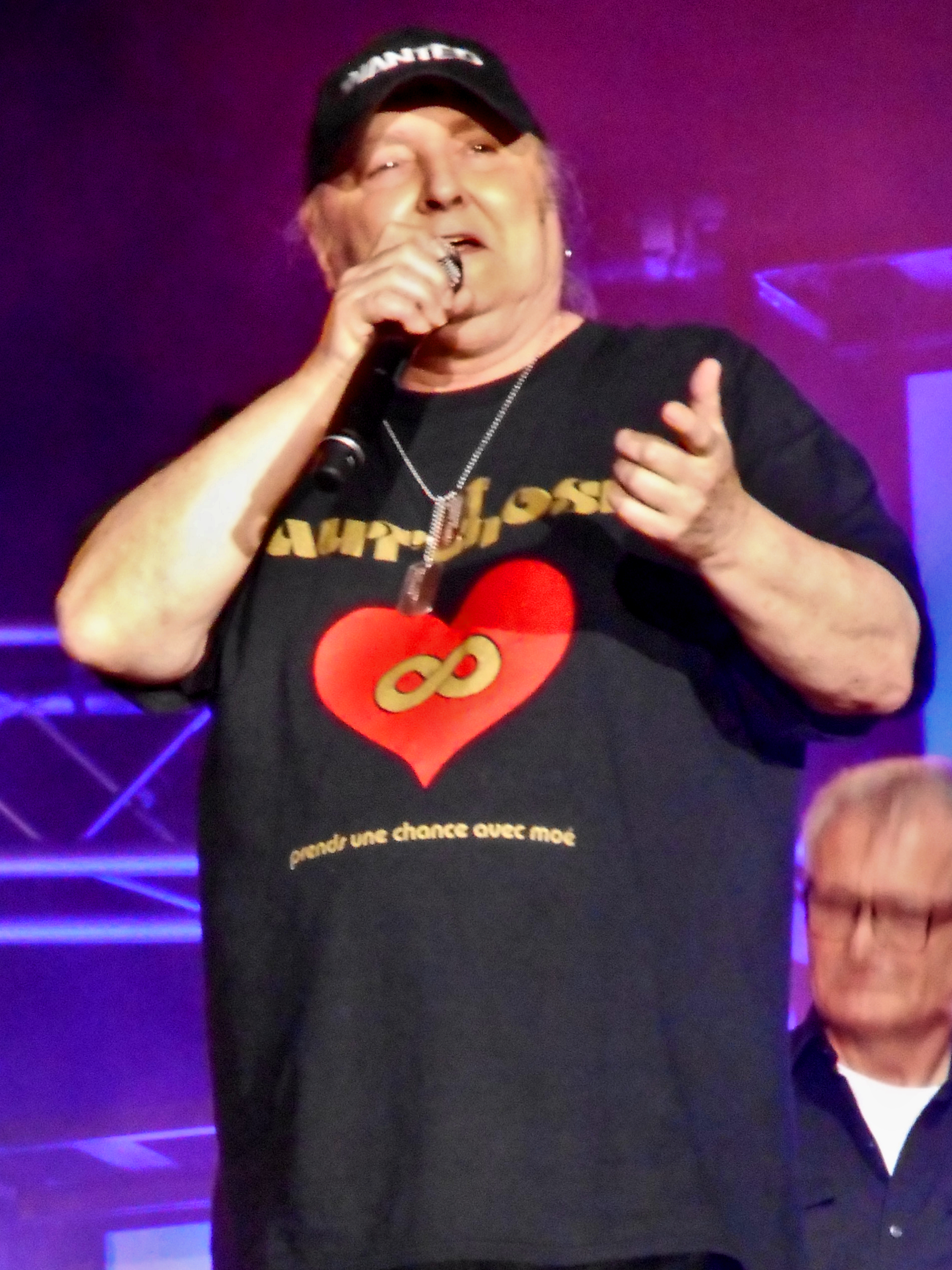
- Born: September 9, 1948; Montreal, Quebec, Canada
- Died: November 5, 2024 (aged 76); Montreal, Quebec, Canada
- Occupations: Singer-songwriter, Poet, Radio host, Teacher

Lucien Francoeur (9 September 1948 – 5 November 2024) was a Québécois singer-songwriter, poet, radio host, and French teacher.

== Biography ==
Lucien Francoeur was born on 9 September 1948 in Montreal, Quebec, Canada.

He ran away at age 14 to go to New York, where he lived in Greenwich Village for three months. There, he lived at the entrances of apartment buildings or at acquaintances. He met poets of the Beat generation such as Gregory Corso. Back in Quebec, he began writing poetry at about 18 years old. From 1968 to 1970 he lived in New Orleans, where he completed high school. He then discovered drugs and rock music.

He studied literature at the Collège de Maisonneuve and contributed to the literary review Les Herbes rouges. After meeting poet and publisher Gaston Miron, he released his first collection of poems, Minibrixes réactées, in 1972.

After several trips to Los Angeles and Vancouver, he founded the rock group Aut'Chose in 1974. They released their first full album Prends une chance avec moé. In 1975, the group participated in the Quebec City Chant'Août festival, gave a concert at the Saint-Jean-Baptiste Day celebrations on Mount Royal and recorded Une nuit comme une autre. In 1976, they recorded Cauchemar américain, and in 1978, Aut'chose.

In 1979 Francoeur was invited to Paris to launch an LP record with his greatest hits called Chaud comme un juke-box. Back in Quebec, he turned to composition. He gave concerts after the release of his album Le Retour de Johnny Frisson, in 1980. On the same year, Francoeur gave a farewell stage performance at l'Imprévu in Old Montreal. In the 1980s, multiple of his songs reached the charts : "Nelligan", "Le rap-à-Billy", and "On achève bien les rockers".

He completed his master at the Université du Québec à Trois-Rivières and became a CEGEP teacher in the early 1980s; first teaching French as a second language at the John Abbott College, then literature at the Collège de Rosemont.In 1987, Radio-Canada asked Marie Bernard, Gerry Boulet, François Cousineau, Steve Faulkner and Michel Rivard to create their own version of Francoeur's text Café Rimbaud. They were initially presented on radio, then the album Café Rimbaud was recorded.

In 1990, Francoeur held a literary segment on the television show Beau et Chaud and became a host at the CKOI radio station. In 1991, he hosted Le blues à Francoeur on Télévision Quatre Saisons. In 1994 he had his own show on Télévision Quatre-Saisons.

He was on the board of directors of the Union des écrivaines et des écrivains québécois. He published 20 or so collections of poems between 1972 and 1988. He had over 30 publications in poetry by the time of his death. He won the Prix Émile-Nelligan of 1983 for his book Les rockeurs sanctifiés.

In 2015, Gala de la musique indépendante du Québec (GAMIQ)'s award was renamed the "Lucien" in his honor. Aut'Chose was inducted in the Musée du rock’n’roll québécois at GAMIQ's event on the same year.

He returned on stage with a reformed Aut'Chose in 2004 and was active until his death. In 2023, his daughter released the film Francœur, on achève bien les rockers about Lucien Francoeur.

In 2024, Francoeur had a heart attack. Francoeur died on 5 November 2024 in Montreal, Quebec, Canada.

== Discography ==
Singles
| Year | Title |
|---|---|
| 1978 | Marlene / Pin-up |
| 1980 | Nelligan / Fascination |
| 1981 | Directement de Paris / Chocs électriques |
| 1983 | Le rap-à-Billy / Tête d’affiche |
| 1985 | Waikiki Beach / No Man’s Land |
| 1985 | New York City / Instrumental |
| 1986 | Gypsy Rock / Tattoo |
| 1987 | On achève bien les rockers / Exit Highway |
| 1987 | Rock City / Sur la place publique |
| 1988 | Mister Reagan / Le soleil sur la ville |

Albums
| Year | Title |
|---|---|
| 1977 | Aut’chose |
| 1980 | Le retour de Johnny Frisson |
| 1983 | Jour et nuit |
| 1985 | Dernière vision |
| 1987 | Les gitans reviennent toujours |
