= Chansons Pour Toutes Sortes de Monde =

Chansons pour toutes sortes de monde

Studio album by Plume Latraverse
- Released: 1990
- Recorded: 1989
- Studio: Studio Multisons (Montreal)
- Genre: Rock
- Label: Disques Dragon
- Producer: Plume Latraverse

Chansons pour toutes sortes de monde (Songs for All Kinds of People) is a 1990 album by Canadian songwriter Plume Latraverse.

== Track listing ==
1. In vitro
2. Le retour d'Hector
3. Divinette
4. Jardin du rêve
5. Le ramoneur
6. Chatte de daure
7. La tarentelle della tarentule
8. Dans la piaule de Louis
9. Pollusonge
10. La chute du prince
11. J'ai vendu ma chèvre
12. Tant qu'on pourra...
13. Popsicles, Les
14. Histoire transparente
15. Une bonne fille
16. Bandrifulement
17. Les culottes de singe
18. Euthanazie
19. La java des dieux
20. Une affaire de famille
21. Pattes de lune
  Music from Les Vacances de M. Hulot by Alain Romans; lyrics by Plume Latraverse
22. En attendant l'huile
23. Le mal du pays
24. Suite
25. Les zarchitectes
26. La ballade de Sandale et Gandhi
27. Ton enfance nous quitte
28. Le trésor du docteur Landru
29. Le Joyeux Misanthrope (la complainte du gars qui haït tout pis qui aime rien)
  Song only available on the cassette version of the album
