= Jocelyne Felx =

Canadian literary critic and writer

Jocelyne Felx (born January 2, 1949) is a Quebec literary critic and writer.

== Biography ==
The daughter of Jeanne d'Arc Marleau and Laurier Chartrand, she was born in Saint-Lazare de Vaudreuil and studied French literature at the Université de Montréal and the Université du Québec à Chicoutimi. In 1975, she published her first novel Les vierges folles. Felx has contributed essays and critical writing to various literary magazines and has been a poetry critic for Lettres québécoises.

== Awards and honours ==
In 1982, she received the Prix Émile-Nelligan for Orpailleuse. Felx was awarded the Prix de littérature Gérald-Godin for her collection Les Pavages du désert. In 1995, La Pierre et les heures was included on the shortlist for the Governor General's Award for French-language poetry.

== Selected works ==
- Les vierges folles (1975)
- Les petits camions rouges (1975)
- Feuillets embryonnaires (1980)
- Orpailleuse (1982)
- Nickel-odeon (1985)
- Les Pavages du désert (1988)
- Chute libre (1991)
- La pierre et les heures (1995)
- Poèmes choisis. Émile nelligan/le récital de l'ange (1997)
- La question de Nicodème (2000)
- L'échelle et l'olivier (2006)
- Le nord des heures (2012)

Source for works:
