= France Mongeau =

Canadian educator and poet

France Mongeau (born 1961) is a Quebec educator and poet. Her collection Lumières received the Prix Émile-Nelligan in 1986.

== Early life and career ==
Mongeau was born in Trois-Rivières. She teaches French and literature at the Collège Édouard-Montpetit and has also taught at the Université du Québec à Montréal. Her first collection Lettre en miroir was published in 1980. She has collaborated in the production of a number of artist's books: Ségala with Anne-Laure Héritier-Blanc received the Prix Saint-Denys-Garneau in 2005.

== Selected works ==
- Indices noirs (1987)
- La Danse de Julia (1996)
- La Mer est pierre d'attente (2003)
- Le Guet du renard (2004)
- Estancia en verde / La chambre verte (2006), was a finalist for the Prix Alain-Grandbois
- Lectures d'un lieu (2010)
