= Damien Robitaille =

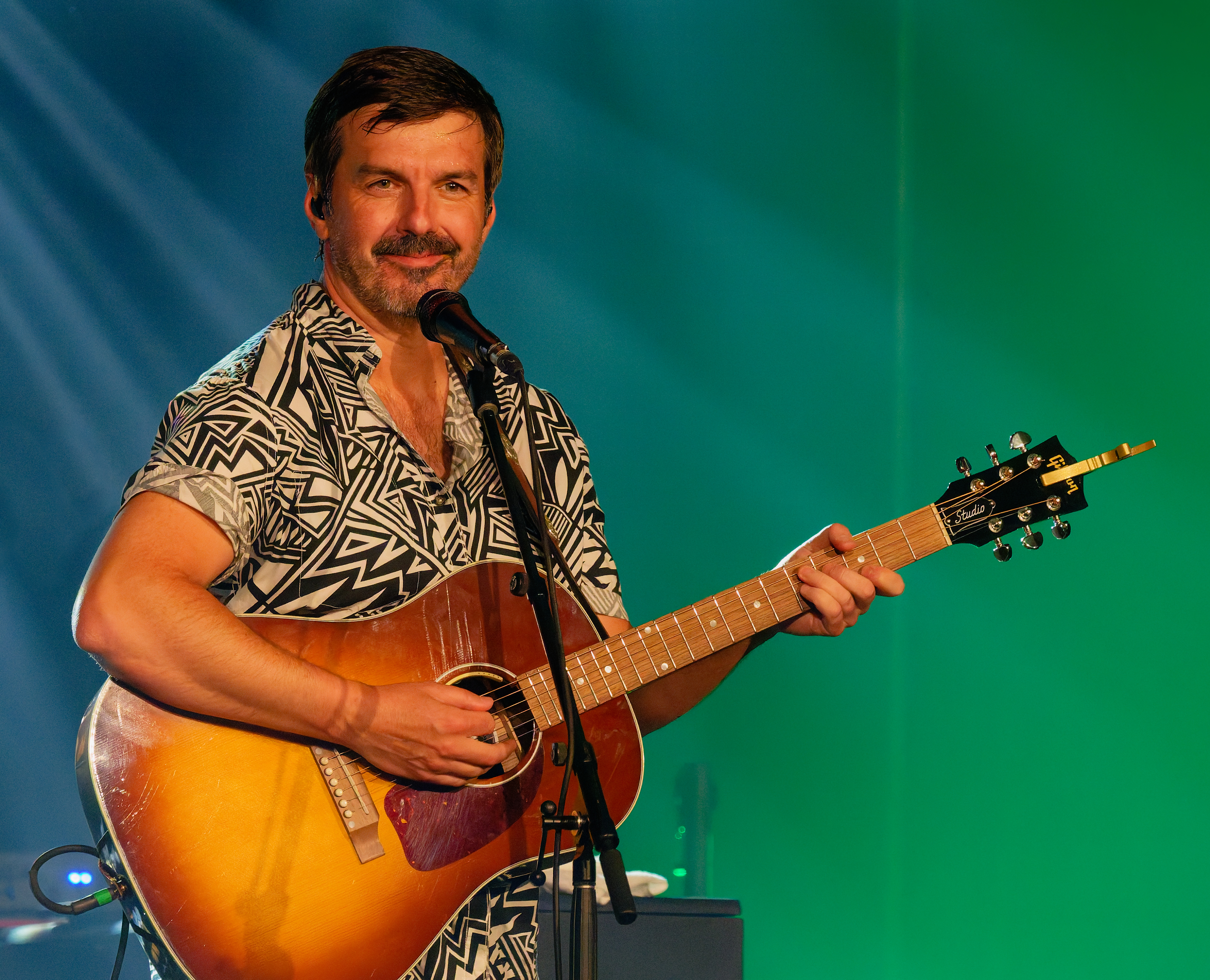
- Damien Robitaille in 20206 at the Festival en chanson de Petite-Vallée

Background information
- Born: June 1981 (age 45); Lafontaine, Ontario, Canada
- Genres: Pop
- Instruments: Vocals; piano; guitar
- Years active: 2000–present
- Label: Audiogram
- Website: damienrobitaille.com

Damien Robitaille (French pronunciation: [damjɛ̃ ʁɔbitaj], born June 1981) is a Canadian musician from the village of Lafontaine, Ontario, in the Georgian Bay area, two hours north-west of Toronto. He is a Franco-Ontarian musician whose career is mainly based in Quebec, where he has lived since 2003.

== Biography ==
Damien Robitaille's father was Francophone, and his mother was Anglophone. Robitaille started playing the piano when he was eight years old. Later in his childhood he learned to play such instruments as the trumpet, guitar and violin. At fifteen, he began to compose his songs in English.

At eighteen, following the advice of his music teacher, Damien Robitaille composed his first three songs in French and recorded his first album. He studied classical music at the Wilfrid Laurier University in Waterloo, where he was a member of the rock band The Mezameeze (made to sound like "Mes Amis" in French, meaning "My Friends"). The band performed Damien's French compositions and won the Battle of the Bands university music competition.

Halfway through his university career he was a finalist in Ontario Pop, a Franco-Ontarian competition, in which he won a scholarship to attend a one-year program at "L'École Nationale de la Chanson de Granby" in Granby, Quebec. In 2002, Damien Robitaille released his first album, Damien. In 2004, Robitaille, a young poetic musician, performed as a finalist at the Festival de la chanson de Granby (Granby Song Festival) in Granby, Quebec. This festival, as well as the Francouvertes festival in Montreal, Quebec where he won first prize, helped Robitaille become a successful musician in Quebec. That same year, he opened for Jim Corcoran in Sudbury. In the fall, Damien Robitaille participated in the Radio-Canada show Le Garage, hosted by Véronic DiCaire, which brought together emerging artists from Ontario, Quebec and the Outaouais region. Also, in 2004, he was a finalist at the Festival de la chanson de Saint-Ambroise, where he won six awards. He then moved to Montreal, where he has lived ever since.

Robitaille performs the vocals, guitar and piano for all of his songs.

In March 2005, his album Damien Robitaille was selected at the Gala des Prix Trille Or as "Discovery of the Year". That same year, he won several awards, including first prize at the Francouvertes de Montréal. It was the first time a francophone artist outside Quebec won that prize. He also won the SOCAN song award.

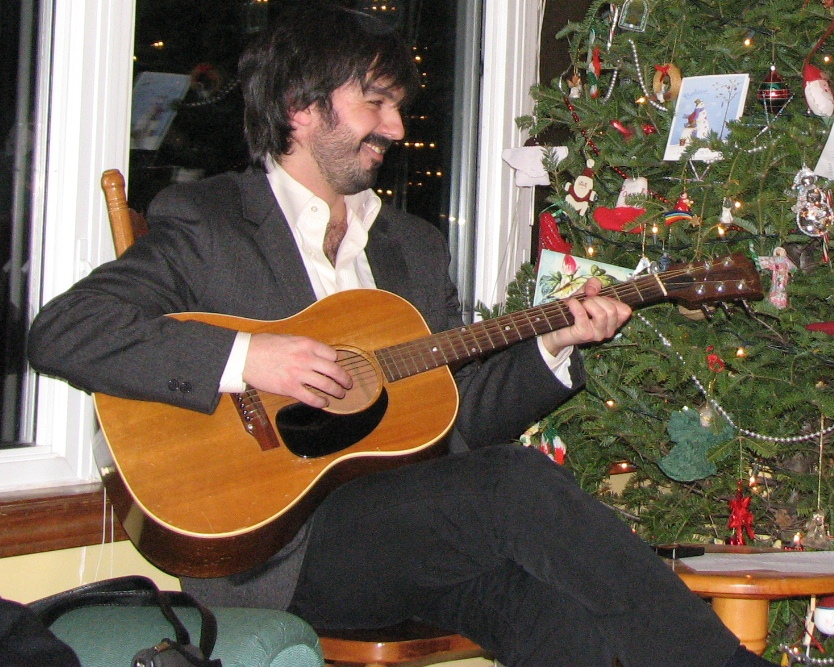

In 2006, Robitaille released his first full-length album titled L'homme qui me ressemble (The Man Who Looks Like Me). The title is a reference to the duality of being a performer having to take on a persona, which is a large part of Robitaille's act. He travels in Europe and participates in several French-Canadian festivals. He also took part in the tribute show to Plume Latraverse (Chapeau à Plume) and the tenth-anniversary concert of the Francouvertes. At the end of the year, he was named "Sacré talent" by the radio station Espace Musique (Radio-Canada). The album L'Homme qui me ressemble received four nominations at the ADISQ in 2007. The record also received a nomination for "best album" at the Juno Awards in 2008.

On September 8, 2009, he launched his album Homme Autonome. The album went on to be nominated eight times for the Gala des Prix Trille Or in January 2011 and won six awards. In 2010, he gave two musical performances during the Vancouver Olympic Games ceremonies. The album Homme autonome then received 8 nominations at the ADISQ in 2010, including Songwriter of the Year, Contemporary Folk Album of the Year, Singer-Songwriter of the Year, Music Video of the Year (On est né nu), Show of the Year and Writer of the Year (he won this award).

External videos
- Damien Robitaille sings “LIVE IT UP” by Mental As Anything

Damien Robitaille released a new album in 2012, Omniprésent. In 2013, he received eight more nominations at the Gala des Prix Trille Or for this new album and his website.

On November 16, 2016, he released the single "Tout feu tou flamme". He is released under Audiogram.

The fifth album Univers parallèles (2017) is produced with Carl Bastien and Michel Bélanger as artistic directors and will be followed in 2019 by an album of Christmas songs, entitled Bientôt ce sera Noël (including seven original tracks and three covers), produced with the same team.

In 2020, during the Covid-19 pandemic, he reinvented himself by posting a series of videos on social networks of himself performing multiple compositions in his home. The videos have been a big hit all over the world. His cover of the song Pump Up the Jam by the band Technotronic went viral with over 10 million views on Twitter. The video was reshared by former basketball player Rex Chapman, actor Elijah Wood and star Jennifer Garner.

His 200th song of the day was We Are the World, a song that features 21 artists in the original version.

As part of the School culture days of 2020, he offered the song Il me semble in a karaoke version so that all the students of Quebec and the Francophonie could sing in together.

=== Other projects ===
==== Radio ====
During the 2011 summer season, Damien Robitaille hosted two radio shows on ICI Musique: Jamais trop tard pour les standards, which highlighted pop and jazz classics from the 1930s to the 1950s, and La Chaîne musicale, which brought together singer-songwriters to present their musical world.

==== TV ====
Ma caravane au Canada, broadcast in 2014 on TV5, featured Damien Robitaille and Vincent Gratton introducing francophones from different regions of Canada.

Damien Robitaille also hosted the show Voyage de chien on the Unis TV channel (filmed in Ontario and Manitoba) with his dog Suki (an American Akita) in 2016. The program showcased the natural encounters and events that occur when you have a dog.

He has also performed three of his songs: "Mambo Mètissè", "Homme Autonome", and "Bienvenue a Longueiul" during two different episodes of the quiz show 100 Génies.

==== Gurdeep Pandher ====
During the 2021 summer, Damien Robitaille collaborated with dance artist and educator Gurdeep Pandher of the Yukon, and their collab video registered 4 million views.

== Discography ==
- Damien (2000) - Independently released album which Damien recorded with the help of his high school music teacher
- Damien Robitaille (2002) - Mini-album featuring tracks from Francouvertes
- L'homme qui me ressemble (2006)
- Homme Autonome (2009)
- Omniprésent (2012)
- Univers parallèles (2017)
- Bientôt ce sera Noël (2019)

== Filmography ==
- 2011 : La Sacrée de Dominic Desjardins : Denis Maurice
- 2013 : Un rêve américain, documentaire de Bruno Boulianne

== Nominations ==
=== Juno Awards ===
Damien Robitaille was nominated for two Juno Awards in the "Francophone Album of the Year" category in 2008 for L'Homme qui me ressemble and in 2014 Omniprésent.

=== Gala des prix Trille Or ===
This biennial event is organized to recognize the talents of musicians and sound artists from Ontario and Western Canada. In 2015, Damien Robitaille hosted the edition.

Year	Work	Award	Result
2005	Damien Robitaille	Découverte de l'année	Nomination
2009	Damien Robitaille	Interprète masculin de l'année	Lauréat
2009	Damien Robitaille	Spectacle de l'année	Lauréat
2009	???	Vidéoclip de l'année	Lauréat
2009	Mètres de mon être de l'album L'Homme qui me ressemble	Prix Radio-Canada de la chanson la plus primée	Lauréat
2009	Damien Robitaille	Artiste ou groupe franco-ontarien s'étant le plus illustré à l'extérieur de la province	Lauréat
2011	Homme autonome	Meilleure pochette	Nomination
2011	???	Meilleur Vidéoclip	Nomination
2011	Damien Robitaille	Auteur, compositeur ou auteur-compositeur par excellence	Lauréat
2011	Damien Robitaille	Interprète masculin par excellence	Lauréat
2011	Homme autonome	Meilleur album	Lauréat
2011	Damien Robitaille	Meilleur spectacle	Lauréat
2011	Damien Robitaille	Artiste solo ou groupe franco-ontarien s'étant le plus illustré à l'extérieur de la province	Lauréat
2011	Damien Robitaille	Coup de cœur des médias	Lauréat
2013	Damien Robitaille	Interprète masculin par excellence	Lauréat
2013	Damien Robitaille	Prix SOCAN de l'auteur, compositeur ou auteur-compositeur par excellence	Nomination
2013	Au pays de la liberté de l'album Omniprésent	Prix Radio-Canada pour la chanson primée	Nomination
2013	Omniprésent	Meilleur Album	Nomination
2013	Damien Robitaille	Artiste solo ou groupe franco-ontarien s'étant le plus illustré à l'extérieur de la province	Lauréat
2013	Omniprésent (pour le travail de Lone Lebone)	Meilleur arrangeur/réalisateur de disque	Nomination
2013	Omniprésent	Meilleure pochette	Nomination
2013	www.damienrobitaille.com	Meilleur site internet	Lauréat
