= Hexes & Ohs =

Canadian electronic indie pop group

- Origin: Montreal, Quebec, Canada
- Genres: Electronic indie pop
- Years active: 2005–present
- Labels: Noise Factory Records
- Members: Heidi Donnelly; Edmund Lam

Hexes & Ohs is a Canadian electronic indie pop group from Montreal, Quebec. Their sound combines 1980s inspired beats and synthesizer sounds with indie pop structures and melodies. They have released three albums since 2005 and have opened for many artists such as Tokyo Police Club, Sloan, and Mates of State. The two members of Hexes and Ohs consist of Edmund Lam and Heidi Donnelly, who were high-school sweethearts who experimented and created their own musical sound.

== History ==
Donnelly and Lam's first musical endeavour was a pop quartet called Jolly Bean. While with this band they recorded two albums and through the 1990s transformed from an East Coast pop style to a more electric sound. Jolly Bean experimented with different styles of music included pop, grunge, and electronic.

Jolly Bean was changed into a trio called "A Vertical Mosaic" in 1999. The band was soon signed by a Canadian record company called Noise Factory Records and continued to record songs. A Vertical Mosaic built up a fan base in the band's city or origin, Montreal. A Vertical Mosaic disbanded in 2004 due to disagreements between the members.

Donnelly and Lam then created the duo Hexes & Ohs shortly after A Vertical Mosaic was disbanded. In 2005, they released their debut album Goodbye Friend, Welcome Lover which consisted of songs recorded from their apartment. The album contained a combination of vocals, guitars, and synthesizer; it placed in the top ten on the Canadian campus and community radio charts in June that year. CBC Radio 3 named "Whadaya Know?" one of their top 50 singles of the year.

Donnelly and Lam have opened for Mates of State, Sloan, Aurevoir Simone, Tokyo Police Club, and Pony up! Heidi and Edmund have also performed at Pop Montreal, Canadian Music Week, North by Northeast, Halifax Pop Explosion, Ladyfest, and the CBC Radio 3 national tour.

As a side project Edmund Lam has also played acoustic guitar with a band called "You and Me", a band which specializes in vocal harmonies and classical accompaniments.

Heidi and Edmund married in Montreal on July 31, 2010.

== Discography ==
Albums:

- Goodbye Friend, Welcome Lover – Noise Factory Records, May 2005
- Motion K’Motion EP – Self Released Limited Edition Tour, August 2006
- Bedroom Madness – Noise Factory Records, September 2008
- Thank You – Lazy At Work, May 2012

Compilations:

- Up.Remixed – Upstairs Recordings, 2008
- Fear of A Digital Planet – Vinyl Republik, 2006
- Québec Émergent 2006
- Ladyfest Ottawa Sampler – Basement Attic Records, 2005
- Noise Factory Sampler No.2 – Noise Factory Records, 2005
- Suburban Rebels – Duotone Records, 2004
