= No Face (rap duo) =

American rap duo

- Origin: New York City
- Genres: Hip hop
- Years active: 1990s
- Labels: Columbia Records, No Face Records, Rush Associated Labels
- Past members: Mark Sexx, the Shah

No Face (originally known as Funktion Freaks) was a New York City-based rap duo active in the early 1990s, known for their outrageous, obscene lyrics. Their music became very controversial because of how over-the-top and obscene it was, with most radio programmers, including black ones, refusing to play even censored versions of their songs. The duo's members were Mark Sexx and the Shah; Ed Lover was also a member for a time. Their only studio album, Wake Your Daughter Up, was released in 1990 on No Face Records, a label affiliated with Russell Simmons' Rush Associated Labels. The album was distributed by both Def Jam Recordings and Columbia Records. The album featured the song "Fake Hair Wearin' Bitch", which featured 2 Live Crew. In 1994, they released the single "No Brothas Allowed" on Interscope Records, accompanied by the B-side "Smashin' Fruit". The group's only hit, "Half", was released as a single from Wake Your Daughter Up and peaked at No. 47 on Billboard's Hot R&B/Hip-Hop Songs.

== Critical reception ==
Jon Pareles gave Wake Your Daughter Up a negative review in the New York Times, writing, "Any two teen-age boys with a drum machine could make a better album than this inept, calculating attempt to ride the 2 Live Crew bandwagon". The Chicago Tribune's Greg Kot was more favorable, giving the album 2.5 out of 4 stars and writing that it "is funkier, funnier and far more inventive than anything on As Nasty as They Wanna Be".

== Discography ==
=== Albums ===
- Wake Your Daughter Up (Rush Associated Labels, 1990)

=== Singles ===
List of singles, with selected chart positions
Title	Year	Peak chart positions		Album
Title	Year	US R&B/HH	AUS	Album
"Revenge of the Bat (He's a Bat Mutha)"	1989	—	—	Non-album singles
"Hump Music"	1989	—	64	Non-album singles
"Half"	1990	47	—	Wake Your Daughter Up
"Fake Hair Wearin' Bitch" (featuring 2 Live Crew)	1991	—	—	Wake Your Daughter Up
"Payback (Is a Mutha)"/"Player"	1993	—	—	Non-album singles
"No Brothas Allowed"	1994	—	—	Non-album singles
