= Claude Rajotte =

Canadian broadcaster (born 1955)

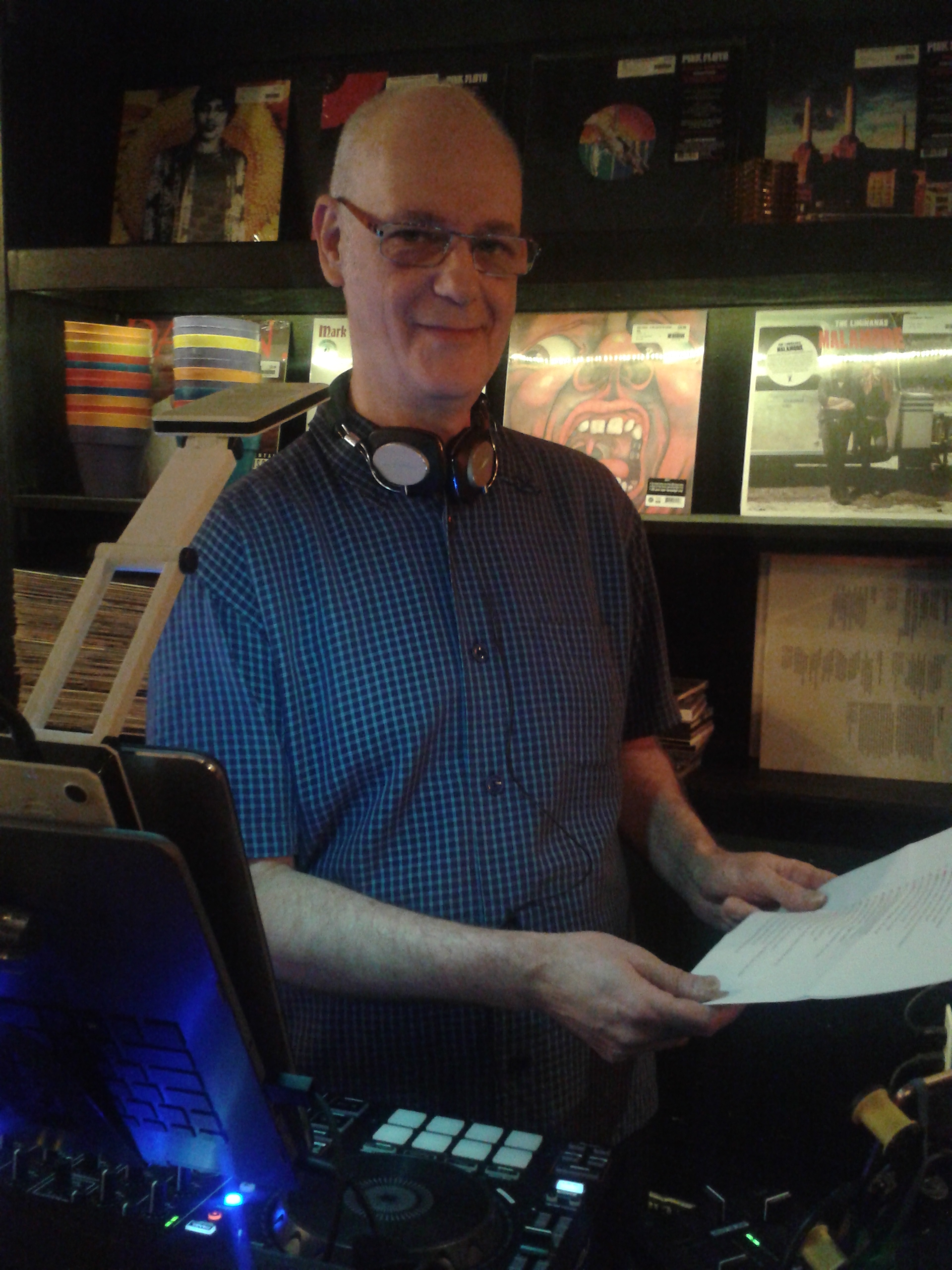
- Rajotte in 2017
- Born: July 3, 1955 (age 70); Drummondville, Quebec
- Occupation: DJ / Musical Critic
- Years active: 1974–present

Claude Rajotte (born July 3, 1955) is a well-known Canadian DJ/VJ/music critic from Montreal, Quebec.

== Life ==
Rajotte was born in Drummondville, Quebec on July 3, 1955. His career started at the local radio station CHRD, in 1974. After short stints in Ottawa and Quebec, he settled in Montreal and started to work for CKOI-FM in 1976.

While being a DJ for CHOM-FM (1982–2002), he spoke English with a marked French Canadian accent that was liked by his radio audience. In the 1980s, Rajotte was in the habit of continually switching from English to French during his broadcasts. With his unmistakable accent, francophones connected immediately, however, that did not detract anglophone listeners, leading to complaints from CHOM's main competitor at the time, the francophone radio station CKOI, Rajotte's former employer. Canada's broadcasting regulators, the Canadian Radio-television and Telecommunications Commission (CRTC), ruled that CHOM DJs were not allowed to speak in French on the air, despite the requirement that CHOM must broadcast a certain proportion of French language songs.

He was also a fixture for over 17 years (1987–2004) on MusiquePlus (the French counterpart to MuchMusic). He was a VJ and a much appreciated album critic. His review show called Le Cimetière des CD (The Cemetery of CDs) was on the air for ten consecutive years. Once a week during the show, Rajotte would hold a "destroy", an event during which he would physically destroy a newly released album which he particularly disliked using unorthodox methods. He was also a regular host of the channel's alternative video show, Nu Musik during the 1980s, and Rage during the 1990s (which was renamed The Claude Rajotte Show).

From 2004 to 2011, Rajotte hosted a late-night radio show on Radio-Canada's Espace Musique. He was also a frequent contributor to Bande à part. In the summer of 2011, he quits Radio-Canada and returns to MusiquePlus. August 2014, his TV program Rajotte moves to Musimax until December 2015. He also hosted a weekly radio show for almost two years on CIBL-FM until December 2020.

== Rajotte as cultural icon ==
Rajotte is widely considered to be a cultural icon in Quebec and is regularly referenced in art, literature, and media.

== Compilations by Rajotte ==
- 2001: Le Cimetière des CD (Gold Jam Records)
- 2007: L'univers de Rajotte (CBC Records)
- 2008: L'univers de Rajotte 2 (CBC Records)
