= Bodh'aktan =

Canadian traditional music group

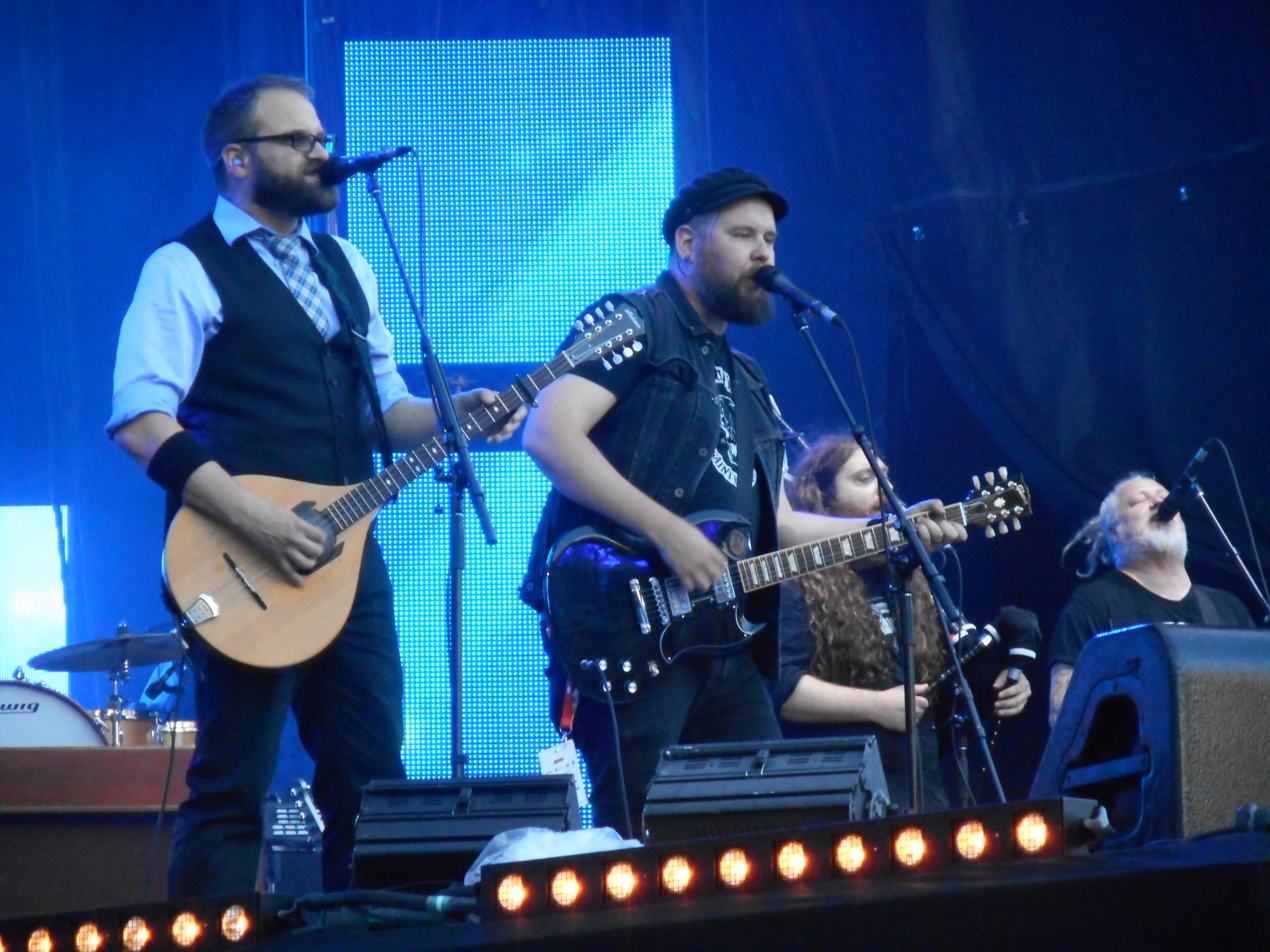
- Montreal, 2015-06-23

Background information
- Origin: Quebec, Canada
- Genres: Traditional Quebec Folk music, Irish traditional music, Celtic punk, Celtic music, punk rock
- Years active: 2011–present
- Labels: Go-Musique, FrostByte, Disques Musicor
- Members: Alexandre "Alex" Richard; Alain Barriault; Éric Tanguay; Éric Gousy; Luc Bourgeois; Benoît Claveau; Marc-Étienne Richard
- Past members: Jonathan Moorman; Robert Langlois; Marc Angers
- Website: www.bodhaktan.com

Bodh'aktan (pronounced Bod Ak Tan) is a Canadian traditional music group, based in Quebec, that fuses elements of Irish, Celtic, Québécois, Maritime, and Breton music with hard rock, country, polka, and punk. The name is inspired by a Gaelic term for fishermen's boots, and by the French pronunciation for the famous Acton boots Botte Acton. Many of the members wear kilts during their stage performances.

== History ==
Bodh'aktan was founded in 2011 by Robert Langlois (bass, vocals), Eric Gousy (drums, vocals), Jonathan Moorman (violin), Éric Tanguay (vocals, accordion), Alexandre Richard (vocals, guitar, flute) and Alain Barriault (vocals, guitar). That year, they released their debut French-language album was Au Diable Les Remords..., which was co-produced by Fred St-Gelais. The band then toured of Quebec and Europe, with dates in France, Belgium, and Germany. They played at many major summer festivals in Quebec in 2012 including Les FrancoFolies de Montréal, Le Festival d'été de Québec, and Le Festival des Rythmes du Monde.

In 2013, they released their second (French) album, Tant Qu'il Restera Du Rhum. The song La Sainte Nitouche became a crossover pop hit on the Quebec charts and was played on rotation on many Quebec radio stations and on MusiquePlus.

Also in 2013, the band released an album in English, Against Winds and Tides. This album had four new tracks, with the rest English translations of the album Au Diable Les Remords..., and one cover song, "Killing in the Name", and a folk-rock cover of the Rage Against the Machine song. Artistic collaborations on the album included vocals from Alan Doyle (of Canadian folk-rock band Great Big Sea) and Quebec singer Marie-Mai, and a guest appearance from German Celtic music band Fiddler's Green in a rendition of their "Fields of Green" featuring Bodh'aktan. The album was released on 8 October 2013 in Canada, the United States, the United Kingdom, and various European countries. They also appeared at the 2013 Festival International de Louisiane.

In 2014, Jonathan Moorman left the band and was replaced by violinist Marc Angers. Luc Bourgeois also joined the band, on bagpipes, flute and guitar. Bodh'aktan then recorded an album of cover songs, in English, called Mixtape (Covers), which was released in 2015. That was followed in 2016 by the album Bodh'Aktan. Through October 2016 and January 2017, Bodh'aktan played the Canada Pavilion at Epcot at Walt Disney World.

In 2018, the band released the album Ride Out the Storm. Langlois and Angers left the band and were replaced by Benoit Claveau on bass and vocals, and violinist Marc-Etienne Richard. This new line-up recorded the album De temps et de Vents, which was released in 2019. This album included contributions from Paddy Moloney of The Chieftains and was praised by London Celtic Punks magazine for encapsulating "everything that Celtic-Punk should be about". In 2021, Bodh'aktan released the compilation album Live - De Part Et D'Autre De L'Atlantique.

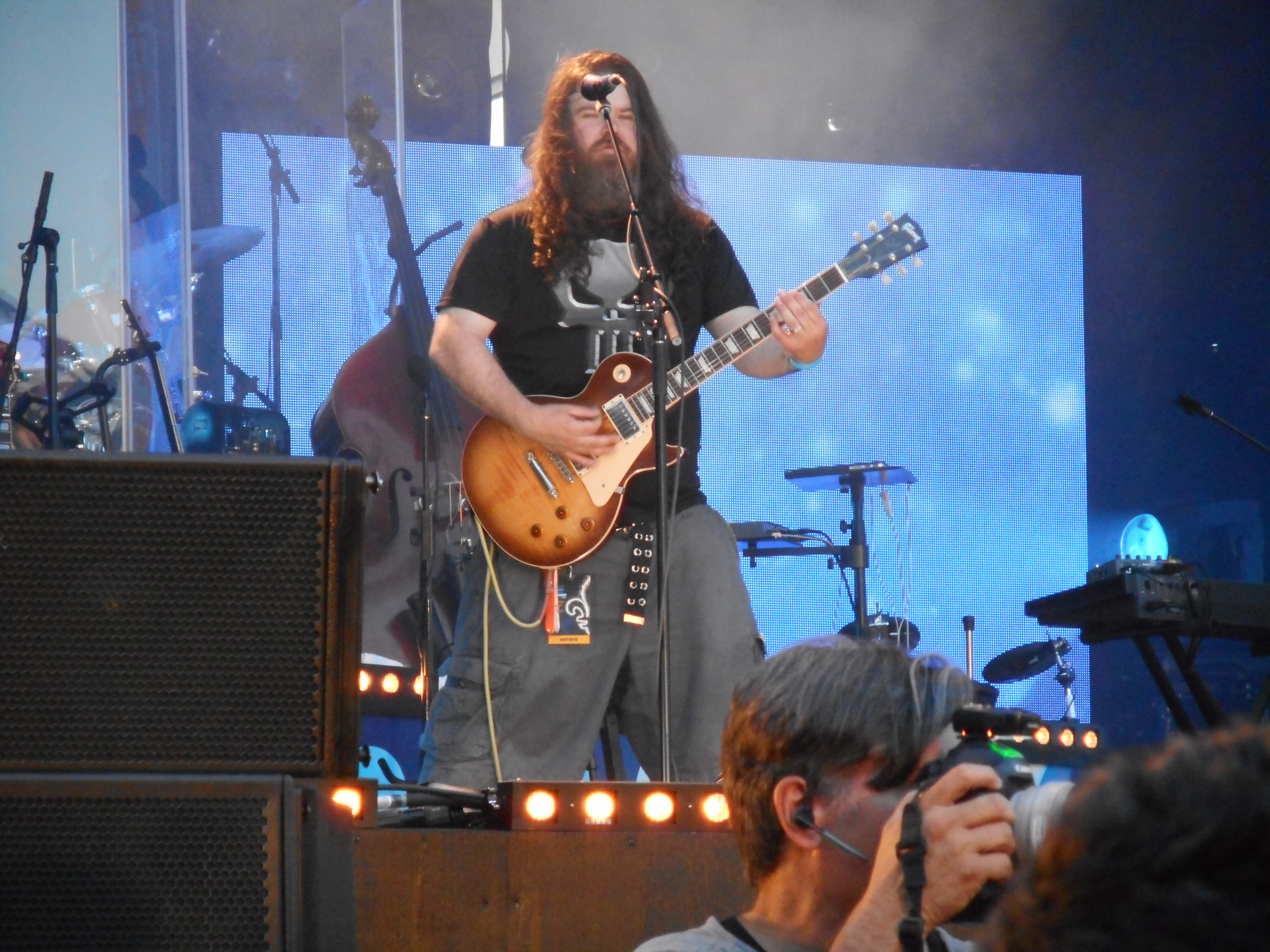

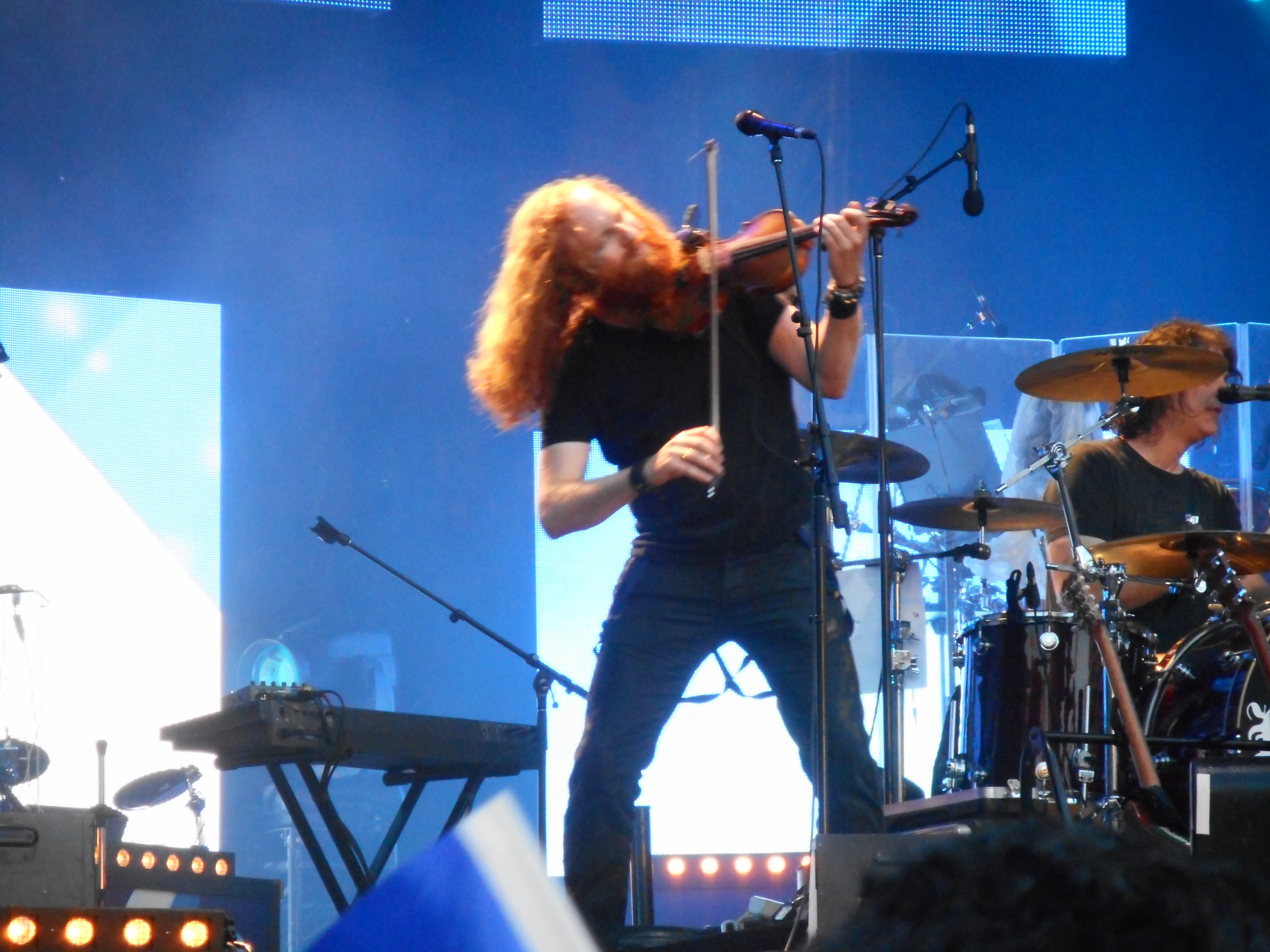

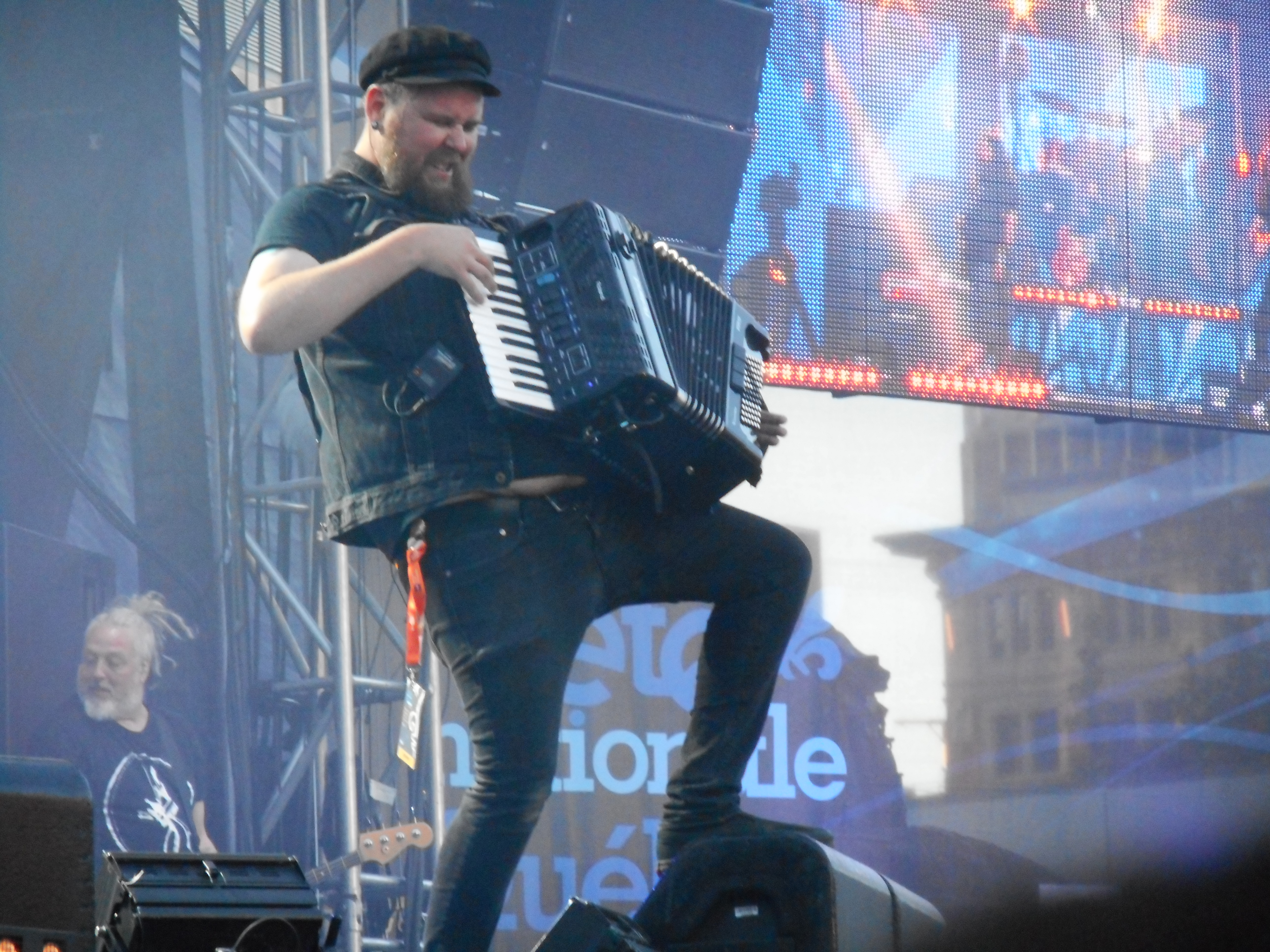

== Awards and nominations ==
- In 2012, Bodh'aktan's debut album, Au diable les remords was nominated for a Félix Award for Quebec Rock Album of the Year.
- At ADISQ 2016, Bodh'aktan's album Bodh'aktan was a nominee for the Rock Album of the Year.

== Discography ==
- Au Diable Les Remords... (2011), Disques Musicor
- Against Winds and Tides (2013), Frostbyte
- Tant Qu'il Restera Du Rhum (2013), Go-Musique
- Mixtape (Covers) (2015), Go-Musique
- Bodh'Aktan (2016), Go-Musique
- Ride Out the Storm (2018), Go-Musique
- De temps et de Vents (2019), Go-Musique
- Live - De Part Et D'Autre De L'Atlantique (2021), Go-Musique
