= Les Dales Hawerchuk =

Canadian alternative rock band

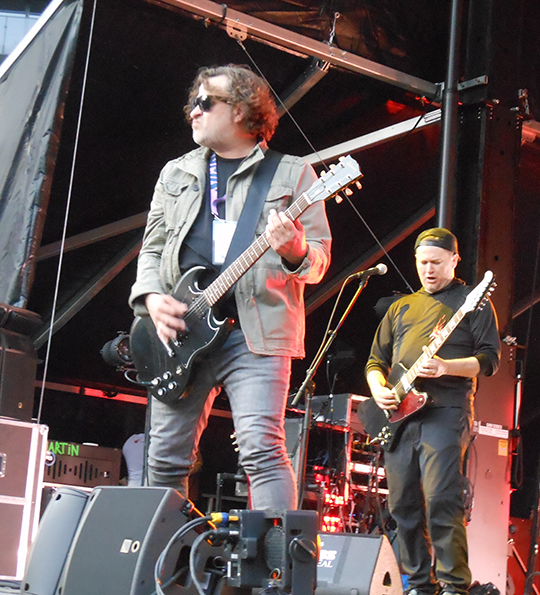
Sylvain Séguin (foreground) and Sébastien Séguin of Les Dales Hawerchuk performing at Les Francofolies in Montreal, 15 June 2025.

Les Dales Hawerchuk are an alternative rock band from the town of Roberval in the Lac Saint-Jean region of Quebec. Their name is a reference to former NHL hockey player Dale Hawerchuk, whose hockey card lead singer Sylvain Séguin found in his car in 2001, shortly after being told that his band would need a name in order to perform at a local music festival. Hawerchuk subsequently gave them permission to use his name on the condition that they "stay out of jail".

The band's other members are Sébastien Séguin (singer, guitarist, Sylvain Séguin's brother), Pierre Fortin (drummer), and Charles Perron (bassist, replacing Martin Bergeron). Their first three albums were produced by Olivier Langevin of Galaxie, while Pierre Fortin produced the fourth.

== Reception ==
Historian Amy Ransom has called their work "raw, fast-paced, guitar-and-drum-driven rockabilly inflected with punk", noting that it evokes Dale Hawerchuk's "speed and energy", while Ici Musique comments that they are "not known for their subtlety". 33Mag ranked their 2005 song "Dale Hawerchuk" the 104th-best song by Quebec artists in the 2000s. The Guardian, however, has described their work as "Green Day-like pop-punk" and "largely unremarkable".

== Discography ==
- "Les Dales Hawerchuk" (2005)
- "Les Dales Hawerchuk 2" (2008)
- "Le tour du chapeau" (2011)
- "Désavantage numérique" (2016)
- "Attaque à cinq" (2024)
