= Galaxie (band) =

French-Canadian garage rock band

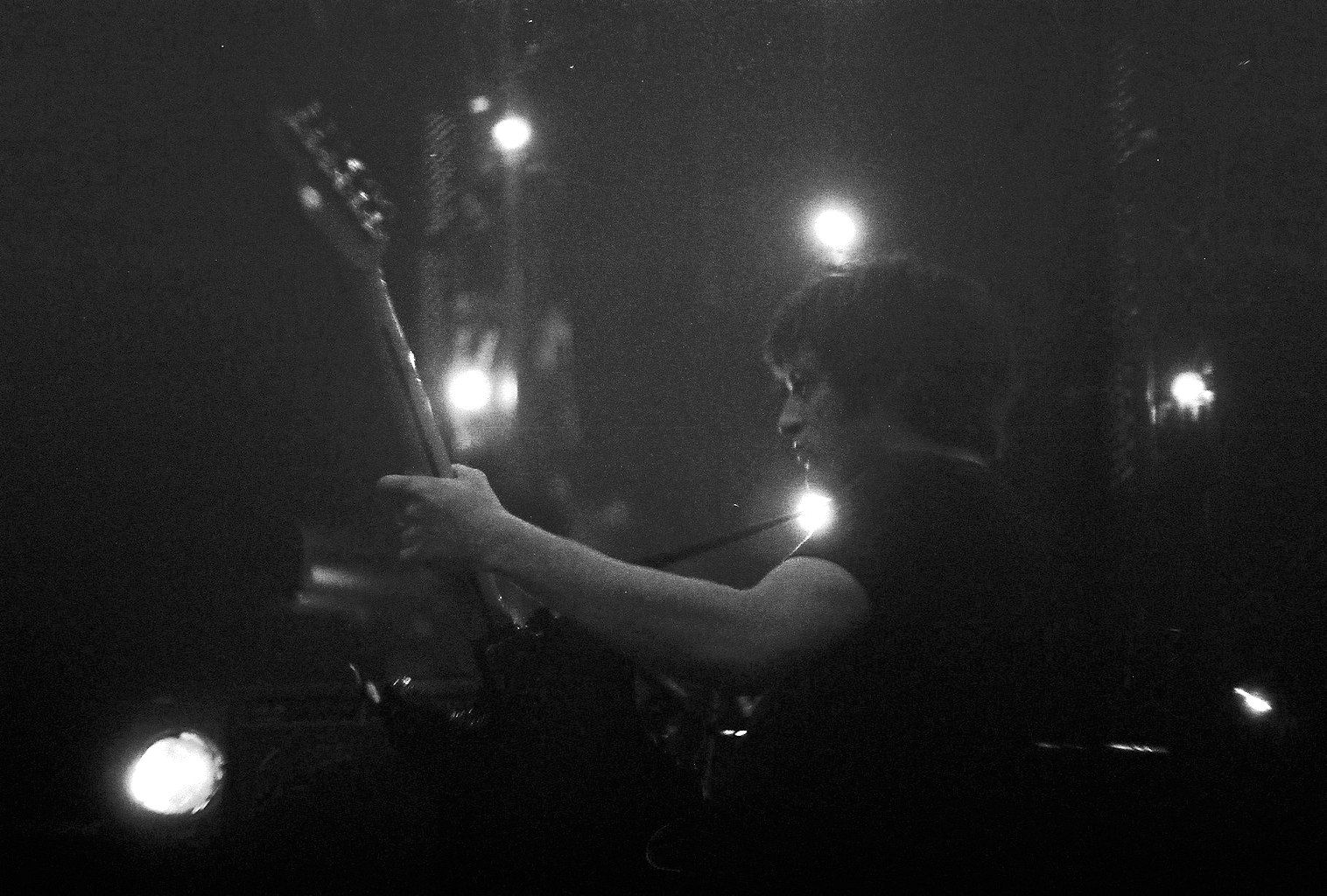
- Galaxie live in June 2011

Background information
- Also known as: Galaxie 500
- Origin: Montreal, Quebec, Canada
- Genres: Indie rock, garage rock, electronic rock
- Years active: 2002-present
- Labels: C4 Productions, Lazy at Work
- Members: Fred Fortin; Pierre Girard; Vincent Peake; François Lafontaine; Olivier Langevin
- Past members: Michel Dufour; Simon Gauthier
- Website: Galaxie 500

Galaxie is a Francophone indie garage rock band formed in 2002 in Montreal, Quebec, Canada. Formerly known as Galaxie 500, they should not be confused with the American alternative rock band Galaxie 500.

== History ==
Under their original name, the band released two albums, Galaxie 500 (2002) and Le Temps au point mort (2006), on the C4 Records label.

Following the release of Le Temps au Point Mort, Galaxie 500 was nominated for the Group of the Year award in the 10th annual MIMI (Montreal International Music Initiative) awards.

The lineup that recorded Galaxie 500 consisted of Olivier Langevin (guitar and vocals), Pierre Girard (guitar), Fred Fortin (guitar and vocals), Simon Gauthier (bass), and Michel Dufour (drums).

Several changes in personnel occurred between the recording of the two albums. For Le Temps au point mort, Langevin was joined by returning members Girard (guitar) and Fortin (drums), and by Vincent Peake (bass) of Groovy Aardvark (1986–2005) and François Lafontaine (keyboards) of Karkwa.

Under its current name, the band released its third album, Tigre et diesel, in 2011. The album was subsequently named a shortlisted nominee for the 2011 Polaris Music Prize.

== Members ==
=== Current members ===
- Fred Fortin (2002–present)
- Olivier Langevin (2002–present)
- Daniel Thouin (2011–present)
- Pierre Fortin (2007–present)
- Karine Pion (2012-present)

=== Former members ===
- Pierre Girard (2002–2009)
- Vincent Peake (2005–2009)
- François Lafontaine (2005–2009)
- Michel Dufour (2002–????)
- Simon Gauthier (2002–????)

== Discography ==
=== Albums ===
- Galaxie 500 (2002)
- Le Temps au point mort (2006)
- Tigre et diesel (2011)
- Zulu (2015)
- Super Lynx Deluxe (2018)
- À demain peut-être (2024)

== See also ==
- Music of Canada
- Music of Quebec
- Canadian rock
- List of Canadian musicians
- List of bands from Canada
- Category:Canadian musical groups
