= Les Breastfeeders =

Canadian rock 'n' roll band

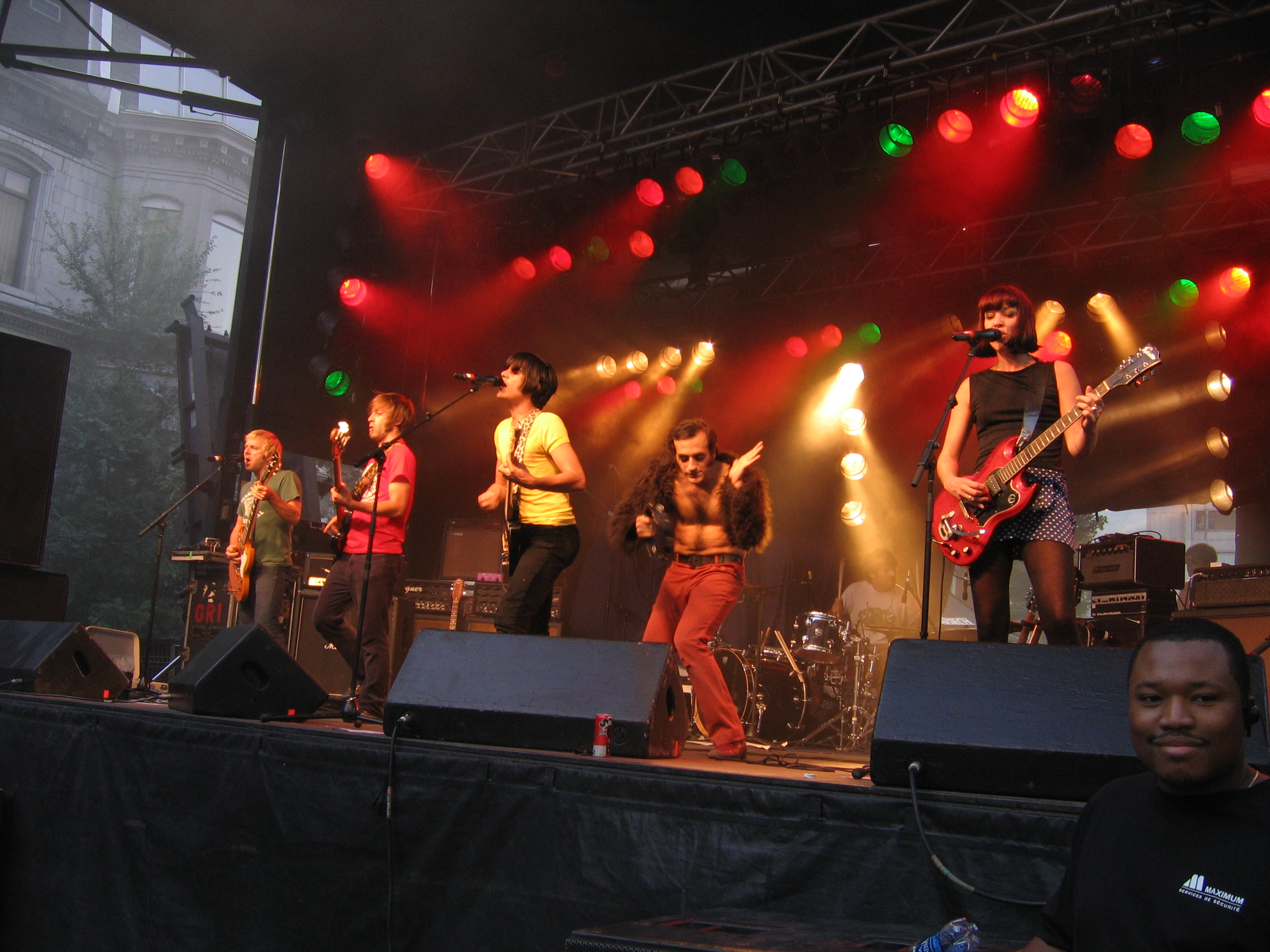
- Les Breastfeeders performing in Montreal in 2005

Background information
- Origin: Montreal, Quebec, Canada
- Genres: Indie rock, garage rock, yé-yé
- Years active: 1999–present
- Labels: Blow The Fuse; Boxson
- Members: Luc Brien; Karine Roxane Isabel; Joe; Johnny Maldoror; Daniel Bossé; Maxime Hébert
- Past members: Sunny Duval; Kiki Boone; Nicotine; Suzie McLelove; Tony Cantara; Freddie Fourteen; Pat Sayers; Pat No
- Website: lesbreastfeeders.ca

Les Breastfeeders are a Canadian francophone rock 'n' roll band from Montreal, Quebec.

== History ==
Formed in 1999, Les Breastfeeders were finalists in the 2003 edition of Francouvertes and also won the SOCAN award for best francophone song of the year in 2003, with their song Angle Mort. After releasing their first album entitled Déjeuner sur l'herbe in 2004 on Blow The Fuse Records, Les Breastfeeders embarked on their first east-coast tour in the United States, while appearing on several American College Radio charts all while their popularity in their home province of Québec kept on rising. During the summer Les Breastfeeders played at Les FrancoFolies de Montréal (2003, 2004, 2005, 2006, 2007) and opened for The New York Dolls at the Quebec City Summer Festival (2005), where they won the Best Canadian Artist – Étoiles Galaxie award (Prix miroir Artiste d'ici).

In February 2006, the band was asked to participate on the Joe Dassin tribute CD called Salut Joe! Hommage à Joe Dassin, for which they recorded the song Bip-Bip. They then took time to record and release their second album Les matins de grands soirs (August 2006), also on Blow The Fuse Records. The video for Mini Jupe et Watusi was featured on "The Knights of Fuzz" DVD, released by Dionysus Records.

On October 1, 2006, Les Breastfeeders, alongside Emily Haines and the Soft Skeleton, Les Trois Accords and The Joel Plaskett Emergency, took part in SEE VOUS PLAY, a show presented by Bande à part and CBC Radio 3.

Although the group's lyrics are all in French, Les matins de grands soirs got great attention from abroad with features and reviews in international publications and sites such as Blackbook Magazine, Spin.com (Artist of the day), NPR and NME. The video for Viens avec moi directed by Jean-François Caissy was video of the day on Pitchfork Media, also on the list of best of 2007 videos to vote for on MTV2 and was presented at the 62nd Annual Edinburgh International Film Festival (June 22, 2008). The video for Funny Funiculaire was also featured on MTV2.

In 2007, Les matins de grands soirs was released in France (Boxson) and in the US (Blow The Fuse Records). The band embarked on a promotional tour and passed through France, Switzerland, England and the US, playing at events such as the South by Southwest Festival (SXSW) in Austin, the Festival International de Louisiane in Lafayette, North by Northeast (NXNE) in Toronto, The Great Escape Festival in Brighton, England and back home in Montreal, they played at Les FrancoFolies de Montréal and at the M for Montreal showcase event.

In 2008, Les Breastfeeders went on a second tour in France and Switzerland and did their first gig in Spain before the release of Les matins de grands soirs in vinyl format, available with an extra song Pousse-Toi, a French cover version of Les Sinners' Nice Try. In France they performed on Fille TV and back in Canada, they composed "Lola The Mermaid", a song for children's television show Roll Play. Amongst their extensive list of shows, they performed at the Ottawa Bluesfest at Canadian Music Week and PBS Wisconsin's 30 Minute Music Hour.

October 2009 marked Les Breastfeeders' tenth anniversary, which they celebrated with a show in Montreal at Lion d'or.

In 2010, the band played at the 2010 Winter Olympics in Vancouver in front of an anglophone crowd who bombarded them with bottles, injuring the lead singer. They received another invitation to return to the Festival International de Louisiane in Lafayette. The following year they released their third album, Dans la gueule des jours.

In 2013, the band made a small appearance in the film Hunting the Northern Godard (La Chasse au Godard d'Abbittibbi) as a garage band called Les Tragédiens.

In April 2019, the band released the single "Ma mort d'avant ma mort" b/w "Hey, petite fille", their first new recording since 2012; the B-side was a French version of The Chocolate Watchband's 1965 garage rock classic "Sweet Young Thing". They followed up in November with "Trois nuits de chien" b/w "J'étudie mon grec", whose B-side was again a cover, of the 1967 single by Quebec garage rock band Les Hou-Lops.

In September 2024 they announced that La ville engloutie, their first new album since Dans la gueule des jours, is slated for release November 8.

== Members ==
- Luc Brien (Vocals, guitar)
- Suzie McLelove (Vocals, guitar)
- Joe (Bass)
- Johnny Maldoror (Tambourine)
- David Deïas (Guitar)
- Maxime Hébert (Drums)

== Past members ==
- Kiki Boone (Drums)
- Nicotine (Drums)
- Tony Cantara (Drums)
- Robbie "Beatnick" Paquin, (Harmonica)
- Freddie Fourteen (Drums)
- Pat Sayers (Drums)
- Pat No (Drums)
- Sunny Duval (Guitar)
- Dan Bossé (Guitar)

== Discography ==
=== Albums ===
- Déjeuner sur l'herbe (2004)
- Les matins de grands soirs (2006)
- Dans la gueule des jours (2011)
- La ville engloutie (2024)

=== Singles ===
- Noël dans le vent (2012)
- Tout va pour le mieux dans le pire des mondes (2006)
- Pousse-toi (Bonus track on Les matins de grands soirs LP 2006)

== Videography ==
- La fille dans la vitrine
- 400 milles
- Danser sur ma tombe
- Viens avec moi
- Tout va pour le mieux dans le pire des mondes
- Funny funiculaire
- Tuer l'idole
- Ça ira
- Minijupe et Watusi
- Ostrogoth-à-gogo (unreleased)
