= Tony Tremblay =

Canadian poet, writer, spoken word artist, journalist and radio personality

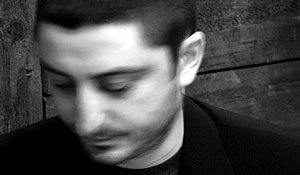
Tony Tremblay - photo: Anne-Marie Chevrier

Tony Tremblay is a Canadian poet, writer, spoken word artist, journalist and radio personality, born in Jonquière, Quebec in 1968, and now living in Montreal.

== Biography ==
Tremblay is the co-founder of Exit poetry magazine. He was awarded the prestigious Émile-Nelligan prize in 1998, and the Salon du livre du Saguenay-Lac-Saint-Jean award for his poetry book Rue Pétrole-Océan.

Producer, radio host, TV reporter, publisher, blogger and webmaster, Tony Tremblay also occasionally performs his poetry live on stage, alone or with musicians. Tony Tremblay performed his poetry all across the province of Quebec, in Canada, and in France.

Among other shows, Tony Tremblay is famous for his performances as a host of the Night Shift series during the Festival Voix d'Amériques, a poetry and spoken word event held in Montreal during winter.

== Tony Tremblay's bibliography ==
- Rock Land, Montréal, l'Hexagone, 2006 - ISBN 2-89006-778-5
- Rue Pétrole-Océan (new edition - first published in 1998), Montréal, l'Hexagone, 2004 - ISBN 2-89006-723-8
- Des receleurs, Montréal, l'Hexagone, 2001 - ISBN 2-89006-657-6
- Contagion, Trois-Rivières, Écrits des Forges, 1996 - ISBN 2-89046-417-2
