= Le Fric Show =

Canadian television series

Le Fric Show is a Canadian television series, which airs on Radio-Canada. Hosted by Marc Labrèche, the series airs a satirical mix of advocacy journalism and entertainment segments. The series has some similarities to Labrèche's earlier La Fin du monde est à 7 heures.

The show first aired in 2006, and was renewed for a second season in 2007.

In 2007, the show collaborated with Bande à part to produce and present "0.99$", a one-off single and video by the Quebec supergroup Vauvandalou.

== CRTC complaint ==
On April 26, 2007, the program aired a report on the pornography industry. Because the show airs at 7:30 p.m., before the traditional 9 p.m. watershed hour for airing adult content on Canadian television, a viewer complaint was subsequently filed with the CRTC. On October 23, the CRTC issued a decision finding that Radio-Canada had acted inappropriately by airing the show in a family-viewing timeslot.
