= Plume Latraverse =

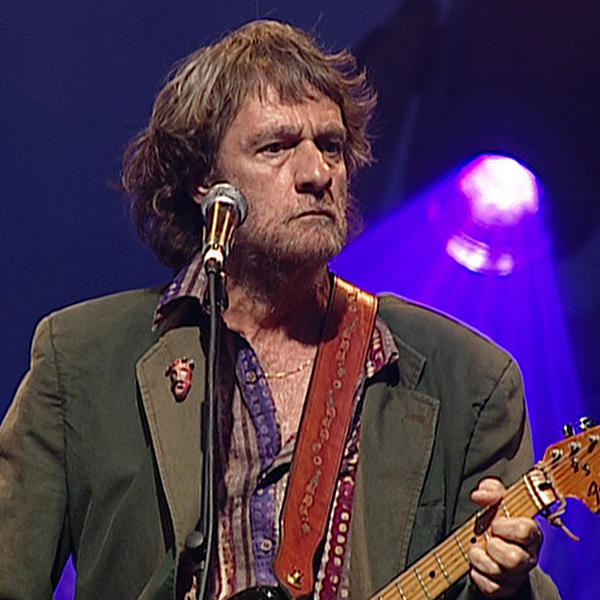
- Plume Latraverse at the FrancoFolies de Montréal 14 June 2012.

Background information
- Born: 11 May 1946 (age 80); Montreal, Quebec
- Genres: Rock, Folk, Blues
- Occupations: Artist, musician, writer, songwriter
- Instruments: Vocals, Guitar, Harmonica, Piano
- Years active: 1970–present
- Label: London/Deram
- Website: www.phaneuf.ca/plume/

Plume Latraverse (born Michel Latraverse 11 May 1946) is a prolific singer, musician, songwriter and author from Quebec. Over the course of his career, he has written nearly 300 songs, combining satire, poetry and social commentary. At the end of the 1960s he formed a band named La Sainte Trinité with Pierrot le fou (Pierre Léger) and Pierre Landry. Then he formed a duo with Steve Faulkner (1972–1975). They performed for the last time at the Chant'Août in Quebec City. In 1976, Plume started a solo career and became one of the most influential names in Quebec counterculture. During a European tour (1979–1980) he staged a show during Le Printemps de Bourges and won the Prime Minister of France's Prize (Prix international de la jeune chanson) and the Pop-Rock prize for the best songwriter from Quebec. In 1982 he worked with Offenbach and produced the album À fond d'train. After his filmed biography, Ô rage électrique, Plume presented a farewell of sorts named Show d'à diable in 1984, after which he brought his singing career to a halt, focusing on painting and writing, before reappearing in 1990. He published many of his songs, texts and storybooks.

In 1980 the Montreal Gazette described him as "the French Frank Zappa".

In 1998, Latraverse released the hit single El Niño.

In 2002, Latraverse received the Félix Hommage Award at the ADISQ Gala, recognizing his contribution to Quebec music.

In 2018, he was awarded the Medal of the National Assembly of Quebec in recognition of his cultural impact.

In 2023, Latraverse received the SOCAN Excellence Award in recognition of his long-standing contribution to Canadian songwriting.

He remains active on stage, in 2025, Plume Latraverse began his tour entitled Rémissionnaire, including concerts at the Place des Arts in Montreal, the Grand Théâtre de Québec, Théâtre Lionel-Groulx and Théâtre Gilles-Vigneault in Saint-Jérôme.

== Discography ==
=== Albums ===
- Triniterre (1971)
- Plume Pou Digne (1974)
- Le Vieux Show Son Sale (1975)
- Pommes De Route (1975)
- À Deux Faces (1976)
- All Dressed (1978)
- Chirurgie Plastique (1980)
- French Tour 1980 (fausse représentation) (1980)
- Livraison par en-arrière (1981)
- Métamorphoses Tôme I (1982)
- Autopsie Canalisée (1983)
- Les Mauvais Compagnons (métaphorme...ose II) (1984)
- Insomni-fère (méphortamoses III)(1985)
- D'un Début À l'Autre (1987)
- Chansons Pour Toutes Sortes de Monde (1990)
- Chansons Nouvelles (1994)
- Mixed Grill (1998)
- Chants d'Épuration (2003)
- Hors-Saisons (2007)
- Chansons nouvelles – revisitées (2008)
- Plumonymes (2008)
- RECHUT! (Odes de ma tanière) (2016)

=== Live albums ===
- En Noir Et Blanc (1976)
- Cinéma Outremont (1977)
- À Fond d'Train (1983)
- Vingtemps (2001)

=== Compilations ===
- Les Plus Pires Succès de Plume (1976)
- Le Lour Passé De Plume Latraverse Vol. I (1988)
- Le Lour Passé De Plume Latraverse Vol. II (1989)
- Le Lour Passé De Plume Latraverse Vol. III (1990)
- Le Lour Passé De Plume Latraverse Vol. IV (1992)
- Le Lour Passé De Plume Latraverse Vol. V (1995)

=== Singles ===
- Rideau / Bossa-Mota
- Bobépine / Lit vert
- La bienséance / U.F.O
- Salusoleil / Le retour à la terre
- La p'tite vingnenne pis l'gros torrieu / Houba houba
- Le grand barda / Marie-Lou
- Mognon donc / New Orleans
- Salut Trenet / Cul-d'sac rock
- Quatre ans après / Élégie
- Le fermier Jean / Valse cliché
- Dis-moé / On peut pas tout avoir
- Parade de mode / Descente aux enfers
- La piste cyclable / Ti-gars
- La ballade de Sandale et Gandhi / Instrumental
- Tant qu'on pourra
- El Nino
- La journée du chèque

=== Books ===
- Contes gouttes ISBN 2-89005-249-4 (1990)
- Pas d'admission sans histoire ISBN 2-89005-528-0 (1993)
- Striboule ISBN 2-89005-609-0 (1995)
