= Groovy Aardvark =

Canadian rock band

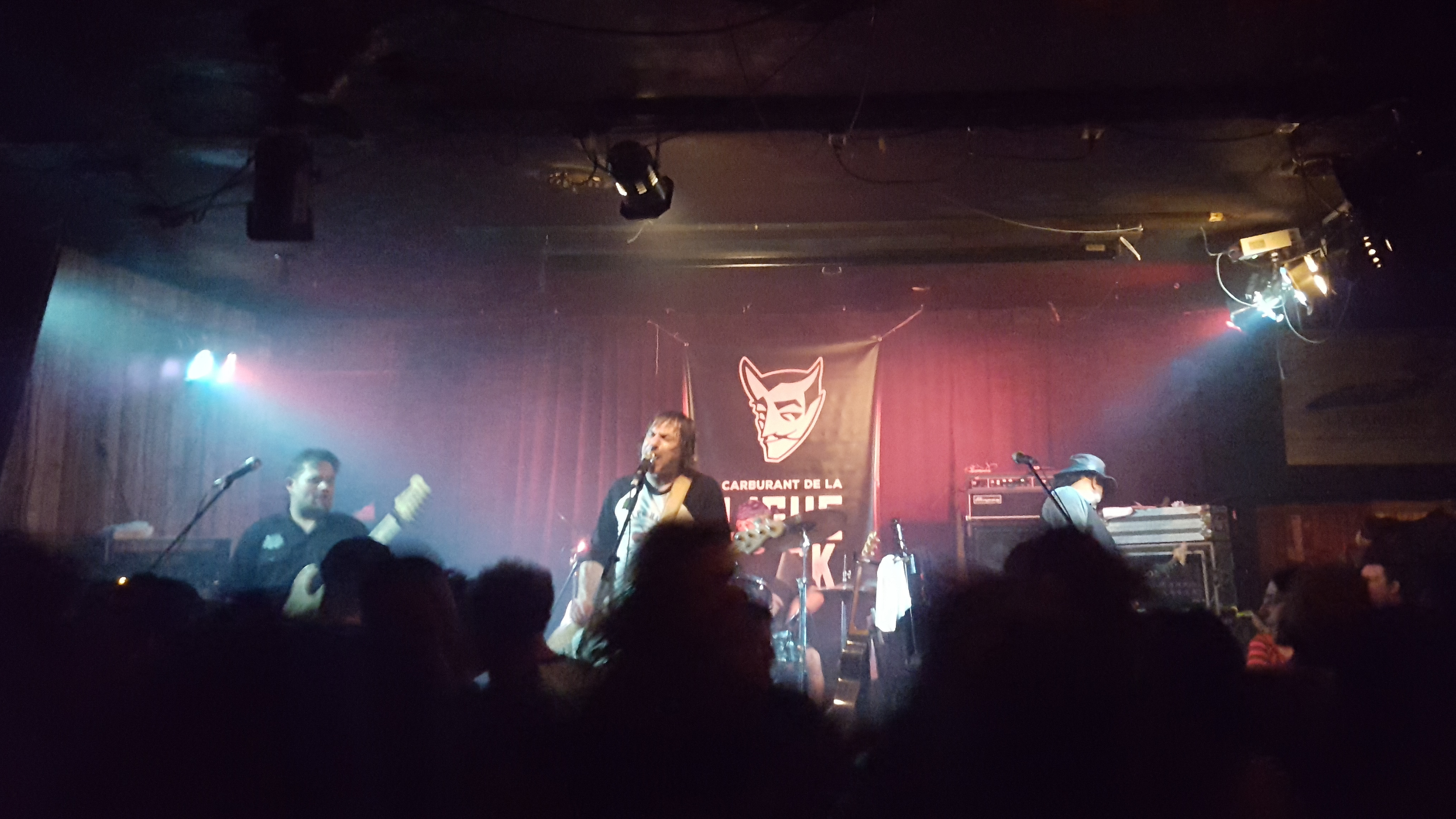
- Groovy Aardvark photographed in St. Hyacinthe, Quebec, Canada at Le Zaricot.

Background information
- Origin: Longueuil, Quebec, Canada
- Genres: Rock
- Years active: 1986–present
- Label: Kafka
- Members: Martin Dupuis; Pierre Koch; François Legendre; Vincent Peake
- Past members: Danny Peake

Groovy Aardvark is a Canadian rock band active since 1986 in the Québec music scene. They performed in English and in French.

== History ==
In 1986, the band Schizophrenic Muff Divers was formed by five college (Édouard-Montpetit) students from Longueuil, Québec. The members of the band were Vincent and Danny Peake, Stéphane Vigeant, Éric Lajambe, and Marc-André Thibert. A year later the band changed its name to Groovy Aardvark.

They released three cassette tape demos before releasing their first album, Eater's Digest, in 1994. Although all of the members spoke French natively, most of the songs on this album were in English. After the release the band toured for two months in Québec.

Groovy Aardvark released a second album Vacuum, in 1996. The band toured in Canada, the United States, and Europe.

In 2012, the band came back together for a reunion show at the Montreal FrancoFollies festival.

== Members ==
Final Lineup

- Vincent Peake – lead vocals, bass (1986–present)
- Martin Dupuis – guitars (1993–present)
- François Legendre – guitars (2002–present)
- Pierre Koch – drums (1996–present)

Former members

- Éric Lajambe – lead vocals (1986)
- Marc-André Thibert – guitars (1986–1999)
- Stéphane Vigeant – guitars (1986–1991)
- Martin Pelletier – guitars (1992–1993; died 2016)
- Denis Lepage – guitars (1999–2002)
- Danny Peake – drums (1986–1996)
- Louis Bélanger – percussion (1991–1994)

== Discography ==
- 1994: Eater's Digest
- 1996: Vacuum
- 1998: Oryctérope
- 1999: Exit Stage Dive
- 2000: Fast Times at Longueuil High (compilation)
- 2002: Masothérapie
- 2005: Sévices rendus
