= Governor General's Award for French-language non-fiction =

Canadian literary award

The Governor General's Award for French-language non-fiction is a Canadian literary award that annually recognizes one Canadian writer for a non-fiction book written in French. It is one of fourteen Governor General's Awards for Literary Merit, seven each for creators of English- and French-language books. The Governor General's Awards program is administered by the Canada Council for the Arts.

The program was created and inaugurated in 1937, for 1936 publications in two categories, conventionally called the 1936 awards. French-language works were first recognized by the 1959 Governor General's Awards.

== Winners and nominees ==
=== 1950s ===
Year	Author	Title
1959	Félix-Antoine Savard	Le barachois

=== 1960s ===
Year	Author	Title
1960	Paul Toupin	Souvenirs pour demain
1961	Jean Le Moyne	Convergences
1962	Gilles Marcotte	Une littérature qui se fait
1963	Gustave Lanctot	Histoire du Canada
1964	Réjean Robidoux	Roger Martin du Gard et la religion
1965	André S. Vachon	Le temps et l'espace dans l'oeuvre de Paul Claudel
1966	Marcel Trudel	Le comptoir, 1604-1627
1967	Robert-Lionel Séguin	La civilisation traditionelle de l'Habitant aux XVIIe et XVIIIe siècles
1968	Fernand Dumont	Le lieu de l'homme
1969	Michel Brunet	Les Canadiens après la conquête

=== 1970s ===
Year	Author	Title
1970	Fernand Ouellette	Les actes retrouvés
1971	Gérald Fortin	La fin d'un règne
1972	Jean Hamelin, Yves Roby	Histoire économique du Québec 1851-1896
1973	Albert Faucher	Québec en Amérique au XIXe siècle
1974	Louise Dechêne	Habitants et marchands de Montréal au XVIIe siècle
1975	Louis-Edmond Hamelin	Nordicité canadienne
1976	Fernand Ouellette	Les Bas Canada 1791-1840, changements structuraux et crise
1977	Denis Monière	Le développement des idéologies au Québec des origines à nos jours
1978	François-Marc Gagnon	Paul-Emile Borduas : Biographie critique et analyse de l'oeuvre
1979	Dominique Clift, Sheila McLeod Arnopoulos	Le fait anglais au Québec
1979	Daniel Latouche	Une société de l'ambiguïté
1979	Pierre Nepveu	Les mots à l'écoute

=== 1980s ===
Year	Author	Title
1980	Maurice Champagne-Gilbert	La famille et l'homme à délivrer du pouvoir
1980	Jean-Luc Hétu	Croissance humaine et instinct spirituel
1980	Yvan Lamonde	La philosophie et son enseignement au Québec
1981	Madeleine Ouellette-Michalska	L'échappée des discours de l'œil
1981	Maurice Cusson	Délinquants pourquoi?
1981	Andrée Pilon-Quiviger	L'éden éclaté
1982	Maurice Lagueux	Le marxisme des années soixante: une saison dans l'histoire de la pensée critique
1982	Flore Dupriez	La condition féminine et les Pères de l'Église latine
1983	Maurice Cusson	Le contrôle social du crime
1983	Clermont Dugas	Les régions périphériques: défi au développement du Québec
1983	Jacques Michon	Émile Nelligan: les racines du rêve
1983	François Rousseau	L'oeuvre de chère en Nouvelle-France. Le régime des malades à l'Hôtel-Dieu de Québec
1984	Jean Hamelin, Nicole Gagnon	Le XXe Siècle: Histoire du catholicisme québécois
1984	Luc Bureau	Entre l'Éden et l'Utopie
1984	Philippe Haeck	La Table d'écriture: poéthique et modernité
1985	François Ricard	La littérature contre elle-même
1985	Lysiane Gagnon	Chroniques politiques
1985	Hélène Pelletier-Baillargeon	Marie Gérin-Lajoie
1986	Régine Robin	Le réalisme socialiste: une esthétique impossible
1986	Marcel Fournier	L'entrée dans la modernité: science, culture et société au Québec
1986	René Major	De l'élection: Freud face aux idéologies américaine, allemande et soviétique
1987	Jean Larose	La petite noirceur
1987	Lise Bissonnette	La passion du présent
1987	Marcel Trudel	Mémoire d'un autre siècle
1988	Patricia Smart	Écrire dans la maison du père
1988	Jacques Desautels	Dieux et Mythes de la Grèce ancienne
1988	Lucien Parizeau	Périples autour d'un langage
1988	Fernande Roy	Progrès, harmonie, liberté
1989	Lise Noël	L'Intolérance : une problématique générale
1989	Jean Éthier-Blais	Fragments d'une enfance
1989	Pierre Morency	L'Oeil américain

=== 1990s ===
Year	Author	Title
1990	Jean-François Lisée	Dans l'œil de l'aigle
1990	Gérard Bergeron	Petit traité de l'État de France
1990	Martin Blais	L'Autre Thomas d'Aquin
1990	Daniel Latouche	Le Bazar
1990	Laurent-Michel Vacher	L'Empire du moderne
1991	Bernard Arcand	Le Jaguar et le Tamanoir
1991	Betty Bednarski	Autour de Ferron : littérature, traduction, altérité
1991	Guy Bourgeault	L'Éthique et le droit : face aux nouvelles technologies biomédicales
1991	Jacques Jaffelin	Le Promeneur d'Einstein
1991	Robert Major	Jean Rivard ou l'art de réussir: idéologies et utopie dans l'oeuvre d'Antoine Gérin-Lajoie
1992	Pierre Turgeon	La Radissonie : Le pays de la baie James
1992	Gilles Boileau	Le silence des Messieurs. Oka, terre indienne
1992	Jean Marcel	Pensées, passions et proses
1992	Pierre Morency	Lumière des oiseaux
1992	Louis Sabourin	Passion d'être, désir d'avoir
1993	François Paré	Les Littératures de l'exiguïté
1993	Léon Dion	Québec 1945–2000 : Les intellectuels et le temps de Duplessis
1993	Maurice Lemire	Formation de l'imaginaire littéraire au Québec 1764–1867
1993	Jean Terrasse	De Mentor à Orphée
1993	Andrée Yanacopoulo	Hans Selye ou la Cathédrale du stress
1994	Chantal Saint-Jarre	Du sida
1994	Fernand Dumont	Genèse de la société québécoise
1994	Jean Lamarre	Le devenir de la nation québécoise
1994	Ginette Pelland	La peur des mots
1994	Georges E. Sioui	Les Wendats : une civilisation méconnue
1995	Yvan Lamonde	Louis-Antoine Dessaulles : Un seigneur libéral et anticlérical
1995	Hélène-Andrée Bizier	Le Noir et le Rouge
1995	Jean Boivin	La Classe de Messiaen
1995	Marcel Fournier	Marcel Mauss
1995	Daniel Latouche	Plaidoyer pour le Québec
1996	Michel Freitag	Le Naufrage de l'université: et autres essais d'épistémologie politique
1996	Gérard Bouchard	Quelques arpents d'Amérique – Population, économie, famille au Saguenay 1838–1971
1996	Gilles Lapointe	L'Envol des signes – Borduas et ses lettres
1996	Benoît Melançon	Diderot épistolier – Contribution à une poétique de la lettre familière au XVIIIe siècle
1996	Denis Vaugeois	La Fin des alliances franco-indiennes – Enquête sur un sauf-conduit de 1760 devenu un traité en 1990
1997	Roland Viau	Enfants du néant et mangeurs d'âmes: Guerre, culture et société en Iroquoisie ancienne
1997	Fernand Dumont	Une foi partagée
1997	Yolande Geadah	Femmes voilées, intégrismes démasqués
1997	Alain Bernard Marchand	Tintin au pays de la ferveur
1997	François Ricard	Gabrielle Roy – Une vie
1998	Pierre Nepveu	Intérieurs du Nouveau Monde : Essais sur les littératures du Québec et des Amériques
1998	Chantal Bouchard	La Langue et le Nombril : Histoire d'une obsession québécoise
1998	Marcel Olscamp	Le Fils du notaire Jacques Ferron 1921-1949 : Genèse intellectuelle d'un écrivain
1998	Régine Robin	Le Golem de l'écriture : De l'autofiction au Cybersoi
1998	Patricia Smart	Les Femmes du Refus global
1999	Pierre Perrault	Le Mal du Nord
1999	Anne Élaine Cliche	Dire le livre
1999	Jean-Claude Dubé	Le Chevalier de Montmagny: Premier gouverneur de la Nouvelle-France
1999	François-Marc Gagnon	Chronique du mouvement automatiste québécois 1941-1954
1999	Daniel Jacques	Nationalité et Modernité

=== 2000s ===
Year	Author	Title
2000	Gérard Bouchard	Genèse des nations et cultures du Nouveau Monde
2000	Brian T. Fitch	À l'ombre de la littérature
2000	Olga Hazan	Le mythe du progrès artistique
2000	Yves Lavertu	Jean-Charles Harvey
2000	Robert Major	Convoyages
2001	Renée Dupuis	Quel Canada pour les Autochtones? La fin de l'exclusion
2001	Jacques Allard	Le roman du Québec: Histoire, perspectives, lectures
2001	Michel Biron	L'absence du maître : Saint-Denys Garneau, Ferron, Ducharme
2001	Madeleine Gagnon	Les Femmes et la guerre
2001	Jacques B. Gélinas	La globalisation du monde: laisser faire ou faire?
2002	Judith Lavoie	Mark Twain et la parole noire
2002	Claude Lévesque	Par-delà le masculin et le féminin
2002	Lucie K. Morriset	La mémoire du paysage — Histoire de la forme urbain d'un centre-ville: Saint-Roch, Québec
2002	Élisabeth Nardout-Lafarge	Réjean Ducharme: Une poétique du débris
2002	Émile Ollivier	Repérages
2003	Thierry Hentsch	Raconter et mourir : aux sources narratives de l’imaginaire occidental
2003	Michel Morin	Vertige! et autres essais a-politiques
2003	Louise Prescott	Le complexe d’Ulysse : signifiance et micropolitique dans la pratique de l’art
2003	François Ricard	Le dernier après-midi d’Agnès: essai sur l’oeuvre de Milan Kundera
2003	Régine Robin	La mémoire saturée
2004	Jean-Jacques Simard	La Réduction: l’Autochtone inventé et les Amérindiens d’aujourd’hui
2004	Jean-Marie Fecteau	La liberté du pauvre : crime et pauvreté au XIXe siècle québécois
2004	Brian T. Fitch	Le langage de la pensée et l’écriture : Humboldt, Valéry, Beckett
2004	Yvan Lamonde	Histoire sociale des idées au Québec (1896–1929)
2004	Roseline Tremblay	L’écrivain imaginaire: essai sur le roman québécois, 1960–1995
2005	Michel Bock	Quand la nation débordait les frontières: les minorités françaises dans la pensée de Lionel Groulx
2005	Paul Bleteau, Mario Poirier	Le vagabond stoïque: Louis Hémon
2005	Gilles Dostaler	Keynes et ses combats
2005	Éric Méchoulan	Le livre avalé: de la littérature entre mémoire et culture (XVIe – XVIIIe siècle)
2005	Sébastien Vincent	Laissés dans l’ombre: les Québécois engagés volontaires de 39-45 (ou quatorze Québécois racontent leur participation volontaire à la Seconde Guerre mondiale)
2006	Pierre Ouellet	À force de voir: histoire de regards
2006	Marie-Françoise Guédon	Le rêve et la forêt: histoires de chamanes nabesna
2006	Thierry Hentsch	Le temps aboli: l’Occident et ses grands récits
2006	Michaël La Chance	Paroxysmes: la parole hyperbolique
2006	Catherine Mavrikakis	Condamner à mort: les meurtres et la loi à l’écran
2007	Annette Hayward	La querelle du régionalisme au Québec (1904–1931): Vers l’autonomisation de la littérature québécoise
2007	Roland Bourneuf	Pierres de touche
2007	Denise Brassard	Le souffle du passage: Poésie et essai chez Fernand Ouellette
2007	André Cellard	Une toupie sur la tête: Visages de la folie à Saint-Jean-de-Dieu
2007	Michel Cormier	La Russie des illusions: Regard d’un correspondent
2008	Pierre Ouellet	Hors-temps: poétique de la posthistoire
2008	Adèle Lauzon	Pas si tranquille
2008	Georges Leroux	Partita pour Glenn Gould: musique et forme de vie
2008	André Major	L’esprit vagabond
2008	Louise Warren	La forme et le deuil: archives du lac
2009	Nicole V. Champeau	Pointe Maligne: l'infiniment oubliée
2009	Djemila Benhabib	Ma vie à contre-Coran: une femme témoigne sur les islamistes
2009	Claude Fournier	À force de vivre: mémoires
2009	Céline Lafontaine	La société postmortelle: la mort, l'individu et le lien social à l'ère des communications
2009	Charles Le Blanc	Le complexe d'Hermès: regards philosophiques sur la traduction

=== 2010s ===
Year	Author	Title
2010	Michel Lavoie	C’est ma seigneurie que je réclame : la lutte des Hurons de Lorette pour la seigneurie de Sillery, 1650-1900
2010	René-Daniel Dubois	Morceaux : entretiens sur l’écho du monde, l’imaginaire et l’écriture
2010	Marie McAndrew	Les majorités fragiles et l’éducation : Belgique, Catalogne, Irlande du Nord, Québec
2010	Pierre Ouellet	Où suis-je ? Paroles des égarés
2010	Yvon Rivard	Une idée simple
2011	Georges Leroux	Wanderer : essai sur le Voyage d’hiver de Franz Schubert
2011	Karine Cellard	Leçons de littérature : un siècle de manuels scolaires au Québec
2011	Henri Dorion, Jean-Paul Lacasse	Le Québec : territoire incertain
2011	Catherine Leclerc	Des langues en partage? Cohabitation du français et de l'anglais en littérature contemporaine
2011	Patrick Tillard	De Bartleby aux écrivains négatifs : une approche de la négation
2012	Normand Chaurette	Comment tuer Shakespeare
2012	Pierre Nepveu	Gaston Miron : La vie d'un homme
2012	Pascal Riendeau	Méditation et vision de l’essai : Roland Barthes, Milan Kundera et Jacques Brault
2012	Yannick Roy	La révélation inachevée : le personnage à l’épreuve de la vérité romanesque
2013	Yvon Rivard	Aimer, enseigner
2013	Alain Deneault	Gouvernance: le management totalitaire
2013	Jean-Jacques Pelletier	La fabrique de l’extrême : les pratiques ordinaires de l’excès
2013	Dominique Perron	L’Alberta autophage : identités, mythes et discours du pétrole dans l’Ouest canadien
2013	Joseph Yvon Thériault	Évangéline : contes d’Amérique
2014	Gabriel Nadeau-Dubois	Tenir tête
2014	Catherine Ferland, Dave Corriveau	La Corriveau: De l’histoire à la légende
2014	Bertrand Gervais	Un défaut de fabrication
2014	Nicolas Lévesque, Catherine Mavrikakis	Ce que dit l’écorce
2014	Jean-Jacques Pelletier	Questions d’écriture: Réponses à des lecteurs
2015	Jean-Philippe Warren	Honoré Beaugrand : La plume et l'épée (1848-1906)
2015	Alain Asselin, Jacques Cayouette, Jacques Mathieu	Curieuses histoires de plantes du Canada, tome 1
2015	Ying Chen	La lenteur des montagnes
2015	Chantal Savoie	Les femmes de lettres canadiennes-françaises au tournant du XXe siècle
2015	Patricia Smart	De Marie de l'Incarnation à Nelly Arcan; Se dire, se faire par l'écriture intime
2016	Roland Viau	Amerindia : essais d'ethnohistoire autochtone
2016	André Habib	La main gauche de Jean-Pierre Léaud
2016	Michel Morin	Être et ne pas être
2016	Yvon Rivard	Exercices d'amitié
2016	Louise Warren	La vie flottante
2017	Serge Bouchard	Les Yeux tristes de mon camion
2017	Benoît Côté	Propositions de clarté
2017	Daniel Grenier	La solitude de l'écrivain de fond
2017	Nicolas Lévesque	Je sais trop bien ne pas exister
2017	Ouanessa Younsi	Soigner, aimer
2018	Frédérick Lavoie	Avant l’après : voyages à Cuba avec George Orwell
2018	Pierre Anctil	Histoire des juifs du Québec
2018	Denys Delâge, Jean-Philippe Warren	Le piège de la liberté : les peuples autochtones dans l’engrenage des régimes coloniaux
2018	Gabrielle Giasson-Dulude	Les chants du mime : en compagnie d’Étienne Decroux
2018	Anne-Marie Saint-Cerny	Mégantic
2019	Anne-Marie Voisard	Le droit du plus fort : nos dommages, leurs intérêts
2019	Daniel Canty	La Société des grands fonds
2019	Sarah Brunet Dragon	Cartographie des vivants
2019	Antonine Maillet	Clin d'œil au Temps qui passe
2019	Patrick Moreau	La prose d'Alain Grandbois. Ou lire et relire Les voyages de Marco Polo

=== 2020s ===
Year	Author	Title	Ref
2020	Frédérique Bernier	Hantises	
2020	Thomas Dommange	Le rapt ontologique	
2020	Michaël La Chance	Une épine empourprée	
2020	Guylaine Massoutre	Nous sommes le soleil	
2020	Stanley Péan	De préférence la nuit	
2021	Serge Bouchard, Mark Fortier	Du diesel dans les veines	
2021	Mathieu Bélisle	LʼEmpire invisible	
2021	Isabelle Daunais	La Vie au long cours	
2021	Esther Laforce	Occuper les distances	
2021	Robert Lalonde	La Reconstruction du paradis	
2022	Sylveline Bourion	La Voie romaine	
2022	Jean-François Beauchemin	La source et le roseau	
2022	Clément de Gaulejac	Tu vois ce que je veux dire? Illustrations, métaphores et autres images qui parlent	
2022	Marie-Pier Lafontaine	Armer la rage : Pour une littérature de combat	
2022	Marie-Hélène Voyer	Lʼhabitude des ruines : Le sacre de lʼoubli et de la laideur au Québec	
2023	Philippe Bernier Arcand	Faux rebelles : Les dérives du politiquement incorrect	
2023	Martine Béland	Mégaptère	
2023	Frédéric Bérard	Jʼaccuse les tortionnaires dʼOmar Khadr	
2023	Francis Dupuis-Déri	Panique à l'Université	
2023	Dahlia Namian	La société de provocation	
2024	Florence-Agathe Dubé-Moreau	Hors jeu : Chronique culturelle et féministe sur l’industrie du sport professionnel	
2024	Geneviève Boudreau	Une abeille suffit : Carnet d’observation d’un jardin urbain	
2024	Léa Clermont-Dion	Porter plainte	
2024	Jérôme Cotte	Oser l’humour éthique : De Socrate à Virginie Fortin	
2024	Stanley Péan	Noir satin	
2025	Ouanessa Younsi	Soigner, écrire	
2025	Alain Denault	Faire que! L’engagement politique à l’ère de l’inouï	
2025	Nathalie Plaat	Mourir de froid, c’est beau, c’est long, c’est délicieux	
2025	Maïka Sondarjee	Tu viens d’où? Réflexions sur le métissage et les frontières	
2025	Louise Warren	Recueillir	
2026	Dalie Giroux	Penser croche	
2026	Nicholas Dawson	Vida, Journal de la peur	
2026	Jean-Frédéric Légaré-Tremblay	Le spleen d’Oulan-Bator	
2026	Catherine Joncas, Yves Sioui Durand	Ondinnok. Le désir secret de l’âme	
2026	Anouk Sugàr	Sur l'errance	
