= Governor General's Award for French-language poetry or drama =

Canadian literary award

The Governor General's Award for French-language poetry or drama was a Canadian literary award that annually recognized one Canadian writer for a work of poetry or drama published in French. It was one of the Governor General's Awards for Literary Merit from 1959 to 1980, after which it was divided into the award for French-language poetry and award for French-language drama. The Governor General's Awards program is administered by the Canada Council for the Arts.

The program was created and inaugurated in 1937, for 1936 publications in two categories, conventionally called the 1936 awards. French-language works were first recognized by the 1959 Governor General's Awards.

== 1950s ==
Year	Author	Title
1959	Félix-Antoine Savard	Le barachois

== 1960s ==
Year	Author	Title
1960	Anne Hébert	Poèmes
1961	No award presented	
1962	Jacques Languirand	Les insolites et les violons de l'automne
1963	Gatien Lapointe	Ode au Saint-Laurent
1964	Pierre Perrault	Au cœur de la rose
1965	Gilles Vigneault	Quand les bateaux s'en vont
1966	Réjean Ducharme	L'avalée des avalés
1967	Françoise Loranger	Encore cinq minutes
1968	No award presented	
1969	Jean-Guy Pilon	Comme eau retenue

== 1970s ==
Year	Author	Title
1970	Jacques Brault	Quand nous serons heureux
1971	Paul-Marie Lapointe	Le réel absolu
1972	Gilles Hénault	Signaux pour les voyants
1972	John Newlove	Lies
1973	Roland Giguère	La main au feu
1974	Nicole Brossard	Mécanique jongleuse suivi de Masculin grammaticale
1975	Pierre Perrault	Chouennes
1976	Alphonse Piché	Poèmes 1946-1968
1977	Michel Garneau	Les célébrations et Adidou Adidouce
1978	Gilbert Langevin	Mon refuge est un volcan
1979	Robert Melançon	Peinture aveugle

== 1980s ==
Year	Author	Title
1980	Michel van Schendel	De l'oeil et de l'écoute
See Governor General's Award for French-language poetry and Governor General's Award for French-language drama for 1981 and after.
