= 1990 Governor General's Awards =

Canadian literary award

The 1990 Governor General's Awards for Literary Merit were prizes awarded to authors in 1990. Each winner of the prize received $10000 and a specially bound edition of their book. The winners were selected by a panel of judges administered by the Canada Council for the Arts.

== English ==
| Category | Winner | Nominated |
|---|---|---|
| Fiction | Nino Ricci, Lives of the Saints | Sky Lee, Disappearing Moon Café; Alice Munro, Friend of My Youth; Leslie Hall Pinder, On Double Tracks; Diane Schoemperlen, Man of My Dreams |
| Non-fiction | Stephen Clarkson & Christina McCall, Trudeau and Our Times | Timothy Findley, Inside Memory: Pages from a Writer's Workbook; Eugene Forsey, A Life on the Fringe: The Memoirs of Eugene Forsey; Ron Graham, God's Dominion: A Sceptic's Quest; James King, The Last Modern: A Life of Herbert Read |
| Poetry | Margaret Avison, No Time | Dionne Brand, No Language Is Neutral; Patrick Lane, Winter |
| Drama | Ann-Marie MacDonald, Goodnight Desdemona (Good Morning Juliet) | Audrey Butler, Black Friday?; John Mighton, Scientific Americans; George F. Walker, Love and Anger |
| Children's literature | Michael Bedard, Redwork | Jan Andrews, The Auction; Brian Doyle, Covered Bridge; Welwyn Wilton Katz, Whale Singer |
| Children's illustration | Paul Morin, The Orphan Boy | Warabé Aska, Seasons; Frances Tyrrell, The Huron Carol |
| French to English translation | Jane Brierley, Yellow-Wolf and Other Tales of the Saint Lawrence | Patricia Claxton, Letters to Bernadette; Sheila Fischman, Benito; Anthony Martin-Sperry, Charlevoix: Two Centuries at Murray Bay; Susan Usher, Community Care and Participatory Research |

== French ==
| Category | Winner | Nominated |
|---|---|---|
| Fiction | Gérald Tougas, La Mauvaise foi | Louis Lefebvre, Le Collier d'Hurracan; Michèle Mailhot, Le Passé composé; Jean Marcel, Jérôme ou de la traduction; France Vézina, Osther, le chat criblé d'étoiles |
| Non-fiction | Jean-François Lisée, Dans l'oeil de l'aigle | Gérard Bergeron, Petit traité de l'État de France'; Martin Blais, L'Autre Thomas d'Aquin; Daniel Latouche, Le Bazar; Laurent-Michel Vacher, L'Empire du moderne |
| Poetry | Jean-Paul Daoust, Les Cendres bleues | Geneviève Amyot, Corps d'atelier; André Brochu, Dans les chances de l'air; Denise Desautels, Leçons de Venise; Joël Des Rosiers, Tribu |
| Drama | Jovette Marchessault, Le Voyage magnifique d'Emily Carr | René-Daniel Dubois, Le Troisième fils du professeur Yourolov; Anne Hébert, L'Île de la Demoiselle |
| Children's literature | Christiane Duchesne, La Vraie histoire du chien de Clara Vic | José Fréchette, L'Automne à 15 ans; Philippe Gauthier, L'Héritage de Qader; Johanne Massé, Le Passé en péril |
| Children's illustration | Pierre Pratt, Les Fantaisies de l'oncle Henri | Mireille Levert, Jérémie et Mme Ming, Stéphane Poulin, Les Amours de ma mère |
| English to French translation | Charlotte Melançon and Robert Melançon, Le Second rouleau | Claire Dupond, Lettres à un ami québécois; Ivan Steenhout, Onyx John |
