= 1982 Governor General's Awards =

Canadian literary award

Each winner of the 1982 Governor General's Awards for Literary Merit was selected by a panel of judges administered by the Canada Council for the Arts.

== English ==
Category	Winner	Nominated
Fiction	Guy Vanderhaeghe, Man Descending	Alice Munro, The Moons of Jupiter; Chris Scott, Antichthon
Non-fiction	Christopher Moore, Louisbourg Portraits: Life in an Eighteenth-Century Garrison Town	Northrop Frye, The Great Code: The Bible and Literature; Christina McCall-Newman, Grits: An Intimate Portrait of The Liberal Party
Poetry	Phyllis Webb, The Vision Tree: Selected Poems	Robert Bringhurst, The Beauty of the Weapons: Selected Poems 1972-1982; Barry Dempster, Fables for Isolated Men; Diane Keating, No Birds or Flowers
Drama	John Gray, Billy Bishop Goes to War	Lawrence Jeffery, Clay; Betty Lambert, Jennie's Story

== French ==
Category	Winner	Nominated
Fiction	Roger Fournier, Le cercle des arènes	Gaëtan Brulotte, Le surveillant; Louis Caron, Les fils de la liberté II: La corne de brume; Anne Hébert, Les fous de Bassan
Non-fiction	Maurice Lagueux, Le marxisme des années soixante: une saison dans l'histoire de la pensée critique	Flore Dupriez, La condition féminine et les Pères de l'Église latine
Poetry	Michel Savard, Forages	Alphonse Piché, Dernier profil
Drama	Réjean Ducharme, Ha ha! ...	Marie Laberge, Avec l'hiver qui s'en vient; Léo Lévesque, ... Quand j'y ai dit ça ... à parti à rire; Jovette Marchessault, La terre est trop courte, Violette Leduc
