= 1983 Governor General's Awards =

Canadian literary award

Each winner of the 1983 Governor General's Awards for Literary Merit was selected by a panel of judges administered by the Canada Council for the Arts.

== English ==
Category	Winner	Nominated
Fiction	Leon Rooke, Shakespeare's Dog	Philip Kreiner, People Like Us in a Place Like This; H. R. Percy, Painted Ladies; Susan Swan, The Biggest Modern Woman of the World
Non-fiction	Jeffery Williams, Byng of Vimy	Ken Dryden, The Game; H. S. Ferns, Reading from Left to Right: One Man's Political History
Poetry	David Donnell, Settlements	Christopher Dewdney, Predators of the Adoration: Selected Poems 1972-82; Don McKay, Birding, or Desire; Anne Szumigalski, Doctrine of Signatures
Drama	Anne Chislett, Quiet in the Land	No advance shortlist was released for this category.

== French ==
Category	Winner	Nominated
Fiction	Suzanne Jacob, Laura Laur	Victor-Lévy Beaulieu, Discours de Samm; France Ducasse, Du lieu des voyages; Carole Massé, L'Existence; Francine Noël, Maryse; Suzanne Robert, Vulpera
Non-fiction	Maurice Cusson, Le contrôle social du crime	Clermont Dugas, Les régions périphériques: défi au développement du Québec; Jacques Michon, Émile Nelligan: les racines du rêve; François Rousseau, L'oeuvre de chère en Nouvelle-France. Le régime des malades à l'Hôtel-Dieu de Québec
Poetry	Suzanne Paradis, Un goût de sel	Claude Beausoleil, Une certaine fin de siècle: Poésie 1973-1983; Hugues Corriveau, Revoir le rouge; Denis Vanier, Rejet de prince
Drama	René Gingras, Syncope	Michelle Allen, La passion de Juliette; René-Daniel Dubois, 26 bis, impasse du Colonel Foisy
