= Nicolas Lévesque =

Nicolas Lévesque may refer to:

- Nicolas Lévesque (director), a Canadian documentary film director,
- Nicolas Lévesque (writer), a Canadian writer.
