= André Giroux =

André Giroux may refer to:

- André Giroux (painter) (1801–1879), French painter and photographer
- André Giroux (writer) (1916–1977), Canadian writer and 1949 Montyon Prize winner
