= Frédérick Lavoie =

Canadian writer and journalist

Frédérick Lavoie is a Canadian writer and journalist from Quebec. He is most noted for his book Avant l’après : voyages à Cuba avec George Orwell, which won the Governor General's Award for French-language non-fiction in 2018.

Lavoie is an independent foreign correspondent whose work has appeared primarily in La Presse and Le Devoir. His book was written about a trip to Cuba that he undertook in 2016 after learning that George Orwell's novel Nineteen Eighty-Four had been published there for the first time.

In 2018, Lavoie and his brother Jasmin published Frères amis, frères ennemis, a collection of their correspondence over a year when Frédérick was working in India while Jasmin, also a journalist, was working in Pakistan.
