= Chris Scott (writer) =

English-Canadian writer

- Born: 1945 (age 80–81); Kingston upon Hull, Yorkshire, England
- Occupations: novelist, short story writer
- Writing career
- Period: 1970s-2010s
- Notable works: "Bartleby", Antichthon, Jack

Chris Scott (born 1945 in Kingston upon Hull, Yorkshire, England) is an English-Canadian writer. His novel Antichthon was a nominee for the Governor General's Award for English-language fiction at the 1982 Governor General's Awards, and his novel Jack won the Arthur Ellis Award for Best Crime Novel in 1989. His novel, Bartleby was republished in Glasgow in 2016.

Educated at the University of Hull, Manchester University, Scott has taught at York University in Toronto and Lake Superior State University in Sault Ste. Marie, Michigan. He became a Canadian citizen in 1975, and resided on a farm in Lanark County, Ontario during much of his writing career.

He is noted for his mixture of genre literature with experimental fiction; Antichthon, for example, applied the format and tropes of a contemporary spy novel to a historical retelling of the 1593 heresy trial of Giordano Bruno, and Jack took as its premise that Thomas Neill Cream, a Scottish-Canadian doctor and murderer, was the real Jack the Ripper.

He has also been a contributor to CBC Radio and a book reviewer for Books in Canada, The Globe and Mail, the Montreal Gazette, the Ottawa Citizen and the Toronto Star.

== Works ==
- Bartleby (1971, 2016)
- To Catch a Spy (1978)
- Antichthon (1982)
- Hitler's Bomb (1984)
- The Heretic (1985) (Antichthon published under another title. As Scott explains via email, "Quartet Books published it in London in 1985, under the title The Heretic. (The house, financed by Gulf oil money, didn't like the Greek title Antichthon.)")
- Jack (1988)
