= Barry Dempster =

Canadian poet and novelist (1952–2025)

Barry Edward Dempster
- Born: 17 January 1952; Toronto, Ontario, Canada
- Died: 27 November 2025 (aged 73); Owen Sound, Ontario, Canada

Barry Edward Dempster (17 January 1952 – 27 November 2025) was a Canadian poet, novelist and editor.

== Life and career ==
Barry Dempster was born in Toronto, Ontario, and educated in child psychology. He was the author of two novels, a children's book, three volumes of short stories, and sixteen collections of poetry. Dempster's prose was first noticed by renowned Canadian editor and writer, John Metcalf, for his anthology Third Impressions (Oberon Press) in which Metcalf showcased three promising young authors. A contract from Oberon Press soon followed for the publication of two collections of highly praised short stories. Quarry Press came forward with an offer to publish his first novel, The Ascension of Jesse Rapture, which also received excellent reviews.

He was twice nominated for the Governor General's Award for literature—for his first book, Fables for Isolated Men (Guernica, 1982), and for The Burning Alphabet (Brick Books, 2005), which also won the Canadian Authors Association Jack Chalmers Award for poetry. In 2010 and 2015, he was a finalist for the Ontario Premier's Award of Excellence in the Arts. In 2013, Dempster was a finalist for his second novel, The Outside World, (Pedlar Press, 2013) for Ontario's Trillium Award.

From 1990 to 1997, he was poetry and reviews editor for Poetry Canada, which quickly became one of Canada's most esteemed literary magazines. For over 10 years, he was the mainstay of the publication in the role of reviews editor and then poetry and reviews editor, as it changed ownership and staff. During this time, Dempster became known for his helpful, supportive letters to submitting writers, his astute book reviews and his "New Voice" discoveries of some of Canada's finest poets.

From 1999 to 2018, he was senior acquisitions editor with Brick Books, where he discovered and edited many of Canada's finest emerging and established poets. His editorial successes included a Griffin Prize winner and a Griffin nominee; he also edited a Governor General's Award winning collection as well as a collection that won the 2005 Trillium Award.

Equally comfortable working in prose and poetry, Dempster also had extensive experience as a creative writing instructor. He was on the faculty at The Banff Centre as mentor for the Writing Studio, Wired Writing and Writing with Styles programs, and was twice the writer-in-residence at the Richmond Hill Public Library. He ran hundreds of workshops in Ontario elementary and high schools, as well as teaching at the Upper Canada Writers' Workshop in Kingston, Ontario and Sage Hill, Saskatchewan. He also offered master classes in Santiago, Chile; Victoria, British Columbia; Mahone Bay and Shelbourne, Nova Scotia; Winnipeg, Manitoba; and in Ottawa, Hamilton, Barrie, Holland Landing and Newmarket in Ontario.

Tread & Other Stories was shortlisted for the 2019 ReLit Award for short fiction.

Dempster lived in York Region with his wife, where he ran a very popular film series "Southlake Cinemania," which raised funds to support literacy through the arts. He and his wife later lived in Grey Bruce. Dempster died in Owen Sound on 27 November 2025, at the age of 73.

== Awards ==
- Governor General's Award for Poetry, Shortlist, 1982
- League of Canadian Poets National Poetry Contest, Honorable Mention, 1990
- Confederation Poets Prize, Honorable Mention, 1994
- Confederation Poets Prize, Winner, 1995
- League of Canadian Poets National Poetry Contest, Honorable Mention, 1995
- Scarborough Bi-Centennial Award of Merit, 1996
- Canadian Literary Awards, Finalist, 2002
- The National Magazine Awards, Shortlist, 2002
- Petra Kenney Poetry Competition, England, 2nd Prize, 2002
- Governor General's Award for Poetry, Shortlist, 2005
- Canadian Authors Association Jack Chalmers Award for Poetry, 2006
- Prairie Fire Poetry Contest, 3rd Prize, 2009
- Ontario Premiere's Award for Excellence in the Arts finalist, 2010
- Trillium Book Award finalist, for novel The Outside World, 2014
- Ontario Premiere's Award for Excellence second time finalist, 2015

== Bibliography ==
=== Poetry collections ===
- Fables For Isolated Men – (poetry) Guernica, 1982 (nominated for a Governor General's Award)
- Globe Doubts – 1983
- Positions to Pray In – 1989
- The Unavoidable Man – 1990
- The Ascension of Jesse Rapture – 1993
- Fire and Brimstone – 1997
- The Salvation of Desire – 2000
- The Words Wanting Out: Selected and New Poems – 2003
- The Burning Alphabet – 2005 (winner of the 2006 Canadian Authors Association Jack Chalmers Poetry Award and nominated for a Governor General's Award)
- Love Outlandish – (poetry), Brick Books, 2009
- Ivan's Birches – (poetry) Pedlar Press, 2009
- Blue Wherever – 2010
- Dying a Little (poetry), Wolsak and Wynn 2011
- Invisible Dogs (poetry), Brick Books, London, Ontario 2013
- Disturbing the Buddha (poetry), Brick Books, London, Ontario 2016
- Being Here, the Chemistry of Startle (poetry), Frontenac House Poetry, Alberta 2022

=== Fiction ===
- Real Places and Imaginary Men (short stories, 174 pages). Oberon Press, Ottawa
- 1984 Writing Home (short stories, 191 pages). Oberon Press, Ottawa
- 1989 The Ascension of Jesse Rapture (novel, 258 pages). Quarry Press, Kingston 1993
- The Outside World (novel). Pedlar Press, December 2013
- Tread and Other Stories (children's), 2018
- David and the Daydreams (children's fiction, 143 pages). Guernica Editions, Montreal 1985

=== Anthologies (as editor) ===
- Tributaries: Writer to Writer (poetry). Mosaic Press, Oakville
- 1980: Best Canadian Stories (short stories). Oberon Press, 1980
- Third Impressions (short stories). Oberon Press 1982
- Canadian Poetry Now: 20 Poets of the 80s (poetry). Anansi, 1984
- And Other Travels (poetry). Moonstone Press, 1988
- Christian Poetry in Canada (poetry). ECW Press, 1989
- More Garden Varieties Two (poetry). The Mercury Press, 1990
- The Oberon Reader (short stories). HarperCollins, 1991
- Vintage 95 (poetry). Quarry Press, 1996
- We All Begin in a Little Magazine, Arc and the Promise of Canada's Poets 1978–1998 (poetry). Carleton/Arc,
- 1998 A Matter of Spirit, Recovery of the Sacred in Contemporary Canadian Poetry (poetry). Ekstasis Editions, 1998
- Literatura na swiecie Canada (poetry). Poland
- I Want to Be the Poet of Your Kneecaps, Poems of Quirky Romance (poetry). Black Moss Press, 1999
- New Life in Dark Seas: Brick Books 25 (poetry). Brick Books, 2000
- Henry's Creature, Poems and Stories on the automobile (poetry). Black Moss Press, 2000
- Why I Sing the Blues, Lyrics and Poems (poetry). Smoking Lung Press, 2001
- Smaller Than God, Words of Spiritual Longing (poetry). Black Moss Press, 2001
- Best Canadian Poetry in English (poetry). Tightrope Books, 2008
- How the Light Gets In...Anthology of Poetry from Canada (poetry). University College, Dublin, 2009
- Best Canadian Poetry in English (poetry), Tightrope Books, 2009
- A Verdant Green (poetry), The Battered Silicon Dispatch Box, 2010
- Best Canadian Poetry in English (poetry) (fall 2010), Tightrope Books, 2010
- Best Canadian Poetry in English (poetry) (fall 2011), Tightrope Books, 2011
