= Richard Lush (writer) =

Canadian poet (born 1934)

- Born: October 28, 1934 (age 91); Toronto, Ontario
- Occupation: writer
- Writing career
- Genre: poetry
- Notable work: A Manual for Lying Down

Richard Malcolm Lush (born October 28, 1934) is a Canadian poet, who was a shortlisted nominee for the Governor General's Award for English-language poetry at the 1985 Governor General's Awards for his collection A Manual for Lying Down. His second collection, A Grass Pillow, was published in 1988, and his third, No Solid Ground, followed in 1991.

He attended the Ontario College of Art and Design and the Toronto School of Art, and also worked as an artist and as an editor for Poetry Canada, the League of Canadian Poets and the literary magazine Writ.
