= H. R. Percy =

Canadian writer

H. R.(Bill)Percy
- Born: Herbert Roland Percy; August 6, 1920; Burham, Kent, England
- Died: December 17, 1996 (aged 76)
- Occupation: writer
- Spouse: Mary Davina Percy nee James
- Writing career
- Period: 1960s–1990s
- Notable work: Painted Ladies

Herbert Rolland Percy (August 6, 1920 – December 17, 1996) was a British-born Canadian writer. He was best known for his novel Painted Ladies, a shortlisted nominee for the Governor General's Award for English-language fiction at the 1983 Governor General's Awards.

Born in Burham, Kent, England, Percy served for much of his working life in the Royal Navy and the Royal Canadian Navy. He published his first volume of short stories, The Timeless Island, in 1960, and concentrated more extensively on writing after his retirement from the navy in 1971 with the rank of lieutenant commander.

In addition to novels and short stories, he also published biographies of Joseph Howe and Thomas Chandler Haliburton, and was an editor of Canadian Author and Bookman, the trade magazine of the Canadian Authors Association.

He died in 1996.

== Works ==
- The Timeless Island (1960)
- Joseph Howe (1976, ISBN 0889022208)
- Flotsam (1978, ISBN 0919948561)
- Thomas Chandler Haliburton (1980, ISBN 088902670X)
- Painted Ladies (1983, ISBN 0886190282)
- A Model Lover (1986, ISBN 0773750525)
- Tranter's Tree (1987, ISBN 0886191548)
- An Innocent Bystander (1989, ISBN 077159464X)
- The Mother Tongue (1992, ISBN 0919001726)
