= Raoul Minot =

French photographer in occupied France during WWII (1893–1945)

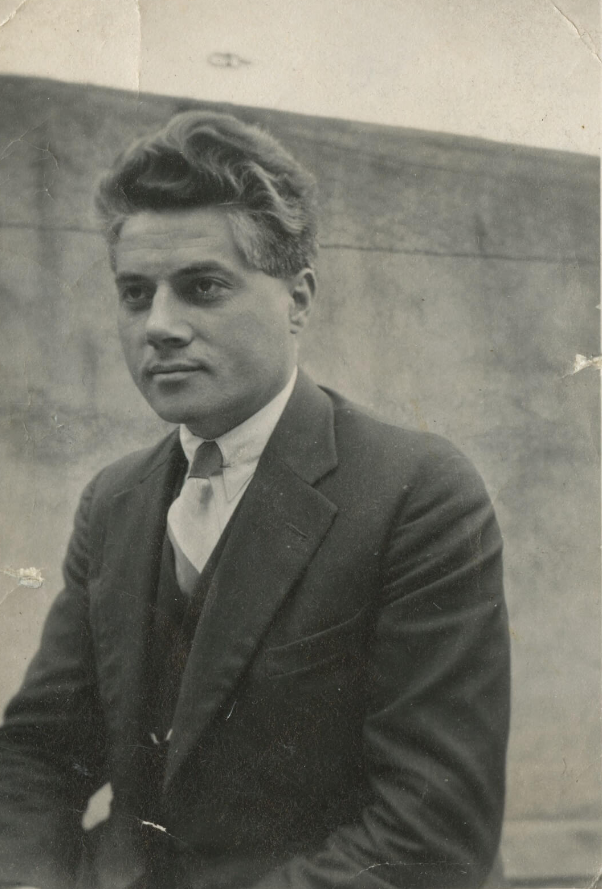
- Born: 28 September 1893; Montluçon, France
- Died: 28 April 1945 (aged 51); Cham, Germany
- Occupations: Salesman, amateur photographer
- Years active: 1911–1942
- Known for: Forbidden photography

Raoul Minot (28 September 1893 – 28 April 1945) was a French amateur photographer who was imprisoned in France and deported to Nazi concentration camps for his clandestine photography in occupied Paris in World War II. He survived internment but died in Germany soon after his liberation.

Minot emerged from obscurity in the summer of 2024 as a result of a four-year investigation by Le Monde journalist Philippe Broussard around the discovery of Minot's anonymous prints.

== Early life ==
Raoul Minot was born on 28 September 1893, in Montluçon, France. In March 1911, he was hired as a scarf vendor in the Parisian department store Printemps. In 1914, he was mobilized for World War I, during which he earned the Croix de guerre with bronze star.

After the First World War, he returned to the Printemps department store, where he met Marthe Bedos, whom he married. The couple moved from Paris to nearby Courbevoie in the 1920s. They had a daughter, Jacqueline. Minot was a passionate amateur photographer and regularly photographed vacations and war veteran events that he attended in Courbevoie.

== Photography and internment ==
Starting in 1940, Minot secretly took more than a thousand photos of daily life in Paris in World War II, which was prohibited under the Nazi occupation. He used a Kodak Brownie and developed negatives at the photo laboratory within his workplace at Printemps. He sold some photos to Louis Juven, an occasional agent of the French Resistance.

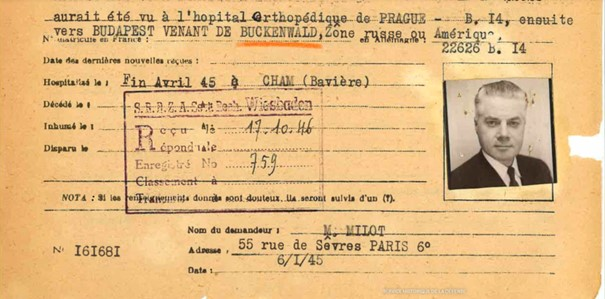
Raoul Minot's file from the Historical Defense Service.

In November 1942, an unnamed informant denounced Minot's activities to the Nazi occupation. After an investigation by the collaborationist Special Brigades, Minot was imprisoned in early 1943 at Fresnes Prison and then transferred to the Royallieu-Compiègne internment camp.

When Minot was arrested, many of his photos and materials were seized by the French police, and the photographic works of his unique genre went unknown for several decades.

On 20 April 1943, Minot was deported from France to Mauthausen concentration camp in Germany. On 17 October 1943, he was transferred to Buchenwald, where he was used as forced labor.

In 1945, he was evacuated with other prisoners from Buchenwald and arrived at Flossenbürg before being forced onto a death march for about two weeks. He was liberated by the Americans on 23 April 1945, but died on 28 April in a hospital in Cham, Germany. His body has never been recovered.

== Legacy ==
Before the discovery of his wartime photography, a single photo attributed to an "M. Minot" was published by Printemps in a booklet in 1965, commemorating the department store's centenary.

Since 1999, Museum of National Resistance has hosted a collection of Minot's photos, unattributed until 2024. They have been traced back to a donation by Daniel Leduc, son of résistant Paul Leduc who had apparently saved the photos from his work in 1945.

In 2020, another batch of 117 photos saved by Renée Damien, a colleague of Minot, were published in a book by Albert Hude titled Paris humilié, 1940–1941, Chronique photographique inédite en 101 clichés.

Also in 2020, photo album collector Stéphanie Colaux found in a flea market in Barjac, Gard, an album with photos from the Nazi occupation of Paris between 1940 and 1942. Aware of their historical importance, she reached out to Le Monde newspaper about her find, and the newspaper proceeded to investigate the source of the photos. In August 2024, the newspaper published a series of five articles by Philippe Broussard detailing the results of the investigation, identifying Minot as the photographer, and surmising that he may have had accomplices. Otherwise, the provenance of the album found at the flea market remains a mystery.

All of Minot's known photos were numbered, and many were embellished with his caustic comments about the German occupiers, some of which were erased. These photos show Paris and her closest suburbs between 1940 and 1942, particularly German soldiers in the capital, military equipment, buildings, deserted streets, civilians queuing for rations, propaganda leaflets, and anti-German inscriptions.

On 11 September 2024, the National Office for Veterans and Victims of War declared Minot a Mort pour la France, a title reserved for honored war dead.

== See also ==
- Paris in World War II
- The Unknown Photographer, from the First World War
