= The Unknown Photographer =

The Unknown Photographer (French: Le photographe inconnu) is a 2015 Quebec virtual reality work based around found photographs of World War I, co-produced by the digital production agency Turbulent and the National Film Board of Canada's French-language Digital Studio, both located in Montreal. The lead artists on the project were Loïc Suty (director, sound designer, scriptwriter), Osman Zeki (lead developer, 3D modeler) and Claudine Matte (art director). The work was produced by Claire Buffet and Louis-Richard Tremblay, with executive producers Marc Beaudet, Benoit Beauséjour and Hugues Sweeney.

== Background ==
The Unknown Photographer is an immersive experience based on almost 300 photographs of World War I, which Montreal director Philippe Baylaucq found as a teenager in 1974 in an abandoned house in Morin Heights, north of Montreal. Years later, Baylaucq passed the photos on to a friend, photographer Bertrand Carrière, who used them as the basis for a photo exhibition, Lieux Mêmes, as well as a short documentary, Finding Fletcher Wade Moses. For over 10 years, Carrière tried to find some trace of what happened to the owner of the photo collection, without success.

== User experience ==
The Unknown Photographer's VR experience involves a walk through a kind of "surrealist museum," exploring these World War I photographs. The production offers users three possible narratives, accompanied by spoken word passages on the horrors of war, written by novelist Catherine Mavrikakis, narrated in English by Julian Casey and in French by François Papineau. The experience lasts 20 to 50 minutes, depending on the choices users make.

== Release ==
The Unknown Photographer premiered at the Rencontres internationales du documentaire de Montréal on November 13, 2015. It had its U.S. premiere in the New Frontier section of the Sundance Film Festival and its European premiere at the International Documentary Film Festival Amsterdam.

At the 2016 Webby Awards, The Unknown Photographer won the People's Voice award in the Online Film & Video/VR: Gaming, Interactive or Real-Time category.

== See also ==
- Paris in World War I
- Raoul Minot
