= Geneviève Amyot =

Canadian poet and novelist (1945–2000)

Geneviève Amyot (January 10, 1945 – June 11, 2000) was a Canadian poet and novelist.

Amyot was born in Saint-Augustin-de-Desmaures, Quebec. She studied pedagogy at the École Normale Notre-Dame-De-Foy from 1961 to 1965, and then French at Laval University, where she received her degree in 1969. She taught in a primary school from 1965 to 1972, and taught literature at the college level.

She then focused on her writing. She collaborated with many magazines including Estuaire, Dérives, La Nouvelle Barre du jour, Interventions, Québec français and Room of One's Own.

She is the aunt of comedian Yves Amyot.

== Collected works ==
- 1975 – La mort était extravagante
- 1976 – L'absent aigu
- 1978 – Journal de l'année passée
- 1982 – Dans la pitié des chairs
- 1988 – Poètes du Québec
- 1988 – Petites fins du monde
- 1990 – Corps d'atelier
- 1994 – Je t'écrirai encore demain
- 2000 – Corneille et compagnie

== Honors ==
- 1990 – Terrasses Saint-Sulpice Poetry Award from the Estuaire magazine for Corps d'atelier
- 1990 – Finalist for the Governor General's Award for French language poetry for Corps d'atelier
