= Jeffery Williams =

Canadian army officer and military historican

Edward Jeffery Williams (January 16, 1920 – April 5, 2011) was a Canadian army officer and military historian. He was most noted for his book Byng of Vimy, a biography of Julian Byng, 1st Viscount Byng of Vimy which won the Governor General's Award for English-language non-fiction at the 1983 Governor General's Awards.

== Background ==
Williams was born in Calgary, Alberta, and was raised by a single mother after his father died a month before his birth. He attended Calgary's Sunalta High School, and signed up for the Calgary Highlanders when he reached enlistment age.

== Military career ==
With the outbreak of World War II, he was commissioned and sent to London, although due to his skill as an administrator he saw little action on the front as he was usually assigned to logistical and organizational work.

Following the end of the war, he briefly returned to Calgary to civilian work, but soon went back into active service. He was second-in-command of Princess Patricia's Canadian Light Infantry during the Korean War, receiving the Bronze Star Medal with "V" device. After the Korean War he served as secretary and flag officer to the Canadian Joint Staff in Washington, D.C., playing a role in the negotiation of the Canada-U.S. agreement on the exchange of nuclear information, served as chief of staff to the 4th Canadian Brigade in Germany, and worked for the High Commission of Canada in the United Kingdom. He retired from the military in the early 1970s.

== Writing ==
In addition to Byng of Vimy his other books included Princess Patricia's Canadian Light Infantry, 1914-1984: Seventy Years' Service, a history of Princess Patricia's regiment first published in 1972 and then updated and expanded in 1986; The Long Left Flank: The Hard Fought Way to the Reich, 1944-1945 (1988); First in the Field, Gault of the Patricias (1995), a biography of Princess Patricia's founder Hamilton Gault; and Far from Home: A Memoir of a 20th Century Soldier (2004), his own memoir of his military career. He was also a regular writer of obituaries of Canadian soldiers for The Telegraph, and played a role in the creation of the Canada Memorial in London's Green Park.

He was named a member of the Order of Canada in 2001.
