= Anne-Marie Alonzo =

Canadian playwright, poet, novelist, critic and publisher

- Born: December 13, 1951; Alexandria, Egypt
- Died: June 11, 2005 (aged 53)
- Awards: Order of Canada

Anne-Marie Alonzo, CM (December 13, 1951 – June 11, 2005) was a Canadian playwright, poet, novelist, critic and publisher.

Born in Alexandria, Egypt, to a father of Palestinian descent and a mother of Syrian and Maltese descent, she immigrated to Quebec in 1963, when she was twelve. In 1966, at the age of 15, she was the victim of a car accident which left her quadriplegic and using a wheelchair.

She received a Bachelor of Arts degree in 1976, a Master of Arts degree in 1978, and a Ph.D. in French studies in 1986 from the Université de Montréal.

The author of 20 books, her poetry collection, Bleus de mine, received the Prix Émile-Nelligan in 1985 and was nominated for the 1985 Governor General's Awards. She co-founded Trois magazine. In 1989, she launched the Festival littéraire de Trois.

In 1996, she was made a Member of the Order of Canada.

== See also ==
- Canadian literature
- Canadian poetry
- List of Canadian poets
- List of Canadian writers
