= Roland Viau =

Canadian academic and writer from Quebec (born 1954)

- Born: February 6, 1954 (age 72); Salaberry-de-Valleyfield, Quebec
- Occupations: academic, writer
- Writing career
- Period: 1990s-present
- Notable works: Enfants du néant et mangeurs d'âme, Amerindia
- Notable awards: Governor General's Award for French-language non-fiction

Roland Viau (born February 6, 1954) is a Canadian academic and writer from Quebec. An ethnologist who teaches in the department of anthropology at the Université de Montréal, he is a two-time winner the Governor General's Award for French-language non-fiction at the 1997 Governor General's Awards for Enfants du néant et mangeurs d'âmes – Guerre, culture et société en Iroquoisie ancienne and at the 2016 Governor General's Awards for Amerindia : essais d'ethnohistoire autochtone.
