= Jean-Paul Daoust =

Canadian poet

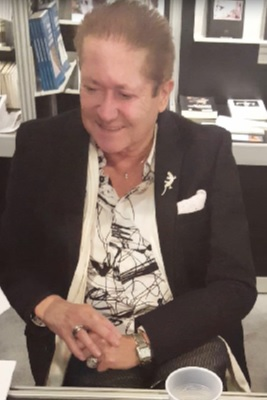
- Born: January 30, 1946 (age 80)
- Occupation: poet
- Awards: Governor General's Awards.

Jean-Paul Daoust (born January 30, 1946) is a Canadian poet. He won the Governor General's Award for French-language poetry at the 1990 Governor General's Awards for Les Cendres bleues.

== Life ==
Daoust has published thirty collections of poetry since 1976, and two novels. He contributed to many poetry magazines, and edited the journal Estuary from 1993 to 2003. He is a member of the Quebec Writers Union.

He is openly gay.

== Works ==
- Oui, cher, récit, Montréal, éd. Cul Q, 1976
- Chaises longues, livre-objet, Montréal, éd. Cul Q, 1977,
- Portraits d'intérieur, Trois-Rivières, éd. APLM, 1981
- Poèmes de Babylone, Trois-Rivières, éd. Écrits des Forges, 1982 (ISBN 2-89046-036-3); Poemas de Babilonia / Poèmes de Babylone, poésie, Trois-Rivières, éd. Écrits des Forges et éd. Mantis Editores (Mexique), 2007, (ISBN 9782896450046) (ISBN 9789709894271)
- Black Diva, Montréal, Lèvres Urbaines no 5, 1983;
- Soleils d'acajou, Montréal, éd. Nouvelle Optique, 1983
- Taxi, Trois-Rivières, éd. Écrits des Forges, 1984
- Dimanche après-midi, Trois-Rivières, éd. Écrits des Forges, 1985
- La Peau du cœur et son opéra, Saint-Lambert, éd. Le Noroît, 1985
- Les Garçons magiques, Montréal, éd. VLB, 1986
- Suite contemporaine, Trois-Rivières, éd. Écrits des Forges, 1987
- Les Cendres bleues, Trois-Rivières, éd. Écrits des Forges 1990; réédition, Paris, éd. Artalect, 1992; poésie, livre de poche, Trois-Rivières, éd. Écrits des Forges, 2015; 6e édition, (ISBN 978-2-8964525-76).
- Rituels d'Amérique, illustrations de Jocelyne Aird-Bélanger, Val-David, éd. Incidit, 1990
- Les Chambres de la mer, Bruxelles, éd. L'Arbre à paroles, 1991
- Les Poses de la lumière, Montréal, Le Noroît, 1991
- Du dandysme, Laval, éd. Trois, 1991, 1991
- Lèvres ouverte, Trois-Rivières, Lèvres urbaines no 24, 1993
- L'Amérique, poème en cinémascope, photographies de Robert Gauthier, Montréal, éd. XYZ, 1993 (ISBN 2892612578); réédition, éd. XYZ, coll. « Romanichels plus », 2003 (ISBN 2892613450)
- Poèmes faxés, en collaboration avec Louise Desjardins et Mona Latif-Ghattas, Trois-Rivières, éd. Écrits des Forges, 1994
- Fusions, illustrations de Jocelyne Aird-Bélanger, Val-David, éd. Incidit, 1994
- 111 Wooster street', Montréal, poésie, éd. VLD, 1996
- Taxi pour Babylone, Trois-Rivières, éd. Écrits des Forges/L'Orange Bleue, 1996
- Les Saisons de l'ange, Montréal, Le Noroît, 1997
- Le Désert rose, Montréal, éd. Alain Stanké, 1999 (ISBN 276040725X)
- Les Saisons de l'ange II, Montréal, Le Noroît, 1999
- Le Poème déshabillé, collectif, éd. L’Interligne, 2000
- Les Versets amoureux, Trois-Rivières, éd. Écrits des Forges, 2001; éd. Phi, 2002, (ISBN 2890466477)
- Roses labyrinthes, Paris, éd. Le Castor astral, 2002 (ISBN 2859204946)
- Cobra et Colibri, Montréal, éd. Le Noroît, 2006 (ISBN 2890185737)
- Cinéma gris, Montréal, éd. Triptyque, 2006 (ISBN 289031555X)
- Fleurs lascives, éd. Écrits des Forges, Trois-Rivières, 2007 (ISBN 978-2-89645-041-1)
- Élégie Nocturne, musique de Manu Trudel, Montréal, éd. Planette Rebelle (Collection Hôtel central), 2008 (ISBN 9782922528855)
- Ailleurs - Épisode I: Charleville-Mézières 2008 : une année en poésie, poésie (collectif), Charleville-Mézières, éd. Musée Rimbaud, 2009,
- Le Vitrail brisé, poésie, Trois-Rivières, éd. Écrits des Forges, 2009, (ISBN 978-2-89645-132-6) - Grand prix Québecor du Festival international de la poésie 2009
- Ailleurs - Épisode II : Charleville-Mézières 2009 : une année en poésie, poésie (collectif), Charleville-Mézières, éd. Musée Rimbaud, 2010, (ISBN 978-2-914882-19-4)
- Carnets de Moncton : scènes de la vie ordinaire, Moncton, éd. Perce-Neige, 2010 (ISBN 978-2-922992-58-8).
- TGV Les Ailleurs (Suite carolomacérienne) : livre-objet (tirage limité, réalisé par Aurélie Derhee, illustré de calligraphies de Jean-Christophe Husson), Charleville-Mézières, éd. Lili éditions et Musée Rimbaud, 2010.
- Libellules, couleuvres et autres merveilles..., Trois-Rivières, éd.d'Art Le Sabord, 2011 (ISBN 978-2-922685-82-4).
- Sand Bar, Montréal, Lévesque éditeur (ISBN 978-2-923844-64-0); The Sand Bar/Sand Bar (traduction par Susan Ouriou et Christelle Morelli) 2011, récits, Toronto, Quattro Books, 2013 (ISBN 978-1-927443-28-6).
- Odes Radiophoniques, Montréal, éd. Poètes de Brousse, 2012 (ISBN 978-2-923338-57-6).
- Lèvres Ouvertes, Trois-Rivières, éd. Écrits des Forges, 2012 (ISBN 978-2-89645-227-9).
- 111 Wooster street, livre de poche, Montréal, éd. Poètes de Brousse, 2013, 2eédition (ISBN 978-2-923338-66-8).
- Odes Radiophoniques II, Montréal, éd. Poètes de Brousse, 2014 (ISBN 978-2-923338-70-5).
- L'Aile de la roue, Sainte-Mélanie, éd. Création Bell'Arte, 2014 (ISBN 978-2-923033-48-8).
- Le Dandy, Saint-Sauveur, éd. de la Grenouillère, 2014 (ISBN 978-2-923949-69-7).
- Odes Radiophoniques III, Montréal, éd. Poètes de Brousse, 2015 (ISBN 978-2-923338-82-8).
- Sexe Glamour, Châtelineau (Belgique) et Trois-Rivières, éd. Le Taillis Prés (Belgique) fondées par Yves Namur en coédition avec les Écrits des Forges, collection "erOtik" dirigée par Eric Brogniet, 2015 (ISBN 978-2-89645-293-4).

== Works in English ==
- Black Diva: Selected Poems, 1982-1986. Translated by Daniel Sloate. Guernica Editions. 1991. ISBN 978-0-920717-54-7.
- Blue Ashes: Selected Poems, 1982-1998. Daniel Sloate. Guernica Editions. 1999. ISBN 978-1-55071-093-9.
