= Leon Rooke =

Canadian novelist

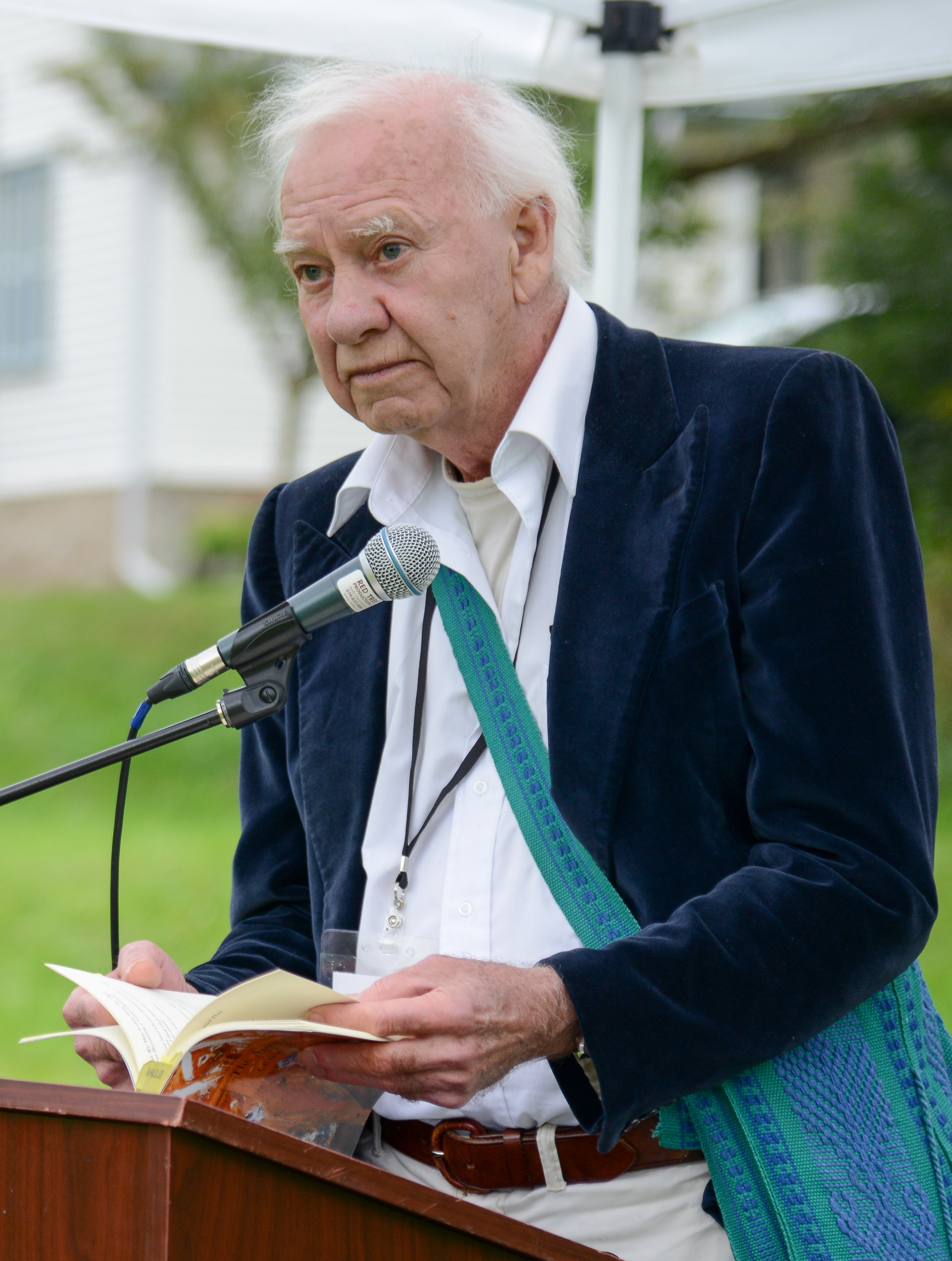
- Rooke at the Eden Mills Writers' Festival in 2013
- Born: September 11, 1934 (age 92)
- Writing career
- Notable awards: Order of Canada
- Website: www.leonrooke.ca

Leon Rooke, CM (born September 11, 1934) is a Canadian novelist and short story writer. He was born in Roanoke Rapids, North Carolina in the United States. Educated at the University of North Carolina, he moved to Canada in 1969. He now lives in Toronto, Ontario.

He is most noted for his 1983 novel Shakespeare's Dog, which was the winner of the Governor General's Award for English-language fiction at the 1983 Governor General's Awards.

With his late wife Connie, Rooke helped to found the Eden Mills Writers' Festival in 1989.

In 2002, Rooke championed The Stone Angel by Margaret Laurence in that year's edition of Canada Reads. Rooke's work also appears in Blackbird: an online journal of literature and the arts.

In 2007, he was made a Member of the Order of Canada.

== Bibliography ==
=== Novels ===
- Fat Woman (Oberon Press, 1980) — nominated for a Governor General's Award
- Shakespeare's Dog (Stoddart, 1983) — winner of the 1983 Governor General's Award for Fiction
- A Good Baby (McClelland & Stewart, 1989)
- Who Goes There (Exile Editions, 1998)
- The Fall of Gravity (Thomas Allen, 2000)
- The Beautiful Wife (Thomas Allen, 2005)
- The House on Major Street (Porcupine's Quill, 2019)

=== Short story collections ===
Approximately 350 short stories published.

- Last One Home Sleeps in the Yellow Bed (Louisiana State University Press, 1968)
- Vault: A Story in Three Parts (Lillabulero Press, 1973)
- The Love Parlour (Oberon Press, 1977)
- The Broad Back of the Angel (Fiction Collective, 1977)
- Cry Evil (Oberon Press, 1980)
- Death Suite (ECW Press, 1981)
- The Magician in Love (Aya Press, 1981)
- The Birth Control King of the Upper Volta (ECW Press, 1982)
- Sing Me No Love Songs, I'll Say You No Prayers: Selected Stories (Ecco, 1984)
- A Bolt of White Cloth (Stoddart, 1984)
- How I Saved the Province (Oolichan Books, 1989)
- The Happiness of Others (Porcupine's Quill, 1991)
- Who Do You Love (McClelland & Stewart, 1992)
- Art. Three Fictions in Prose (1997)
- Oh! Twenty-Seven Stories (Exile Editions, 1997)
- Painting the Dog: The Best Stories of Leon Rooke (Thomas Allen, 2001)
- Hitting the Charts: Selected Stories (Biblioasis, 2006)
- The Last Shot: Eleven Stories and a Novella (Thomas Allen, 2009)
- Swinging Through Dixie (Biblioasis, 2016)
- Fabulous Fictions and Peculiar Practices, with Tony Calzetta (2016)

=== Poetry ===
- Hot Poppies (Porcupine's Quill, 2005)
- The April Poems (Porcupine's Quill, 2013)
- Rank Songbirds (Porcupine's Quill, 2022)
