= Jean-Philippe Warren =

Canadian sociologist from Quebec (born 1970)

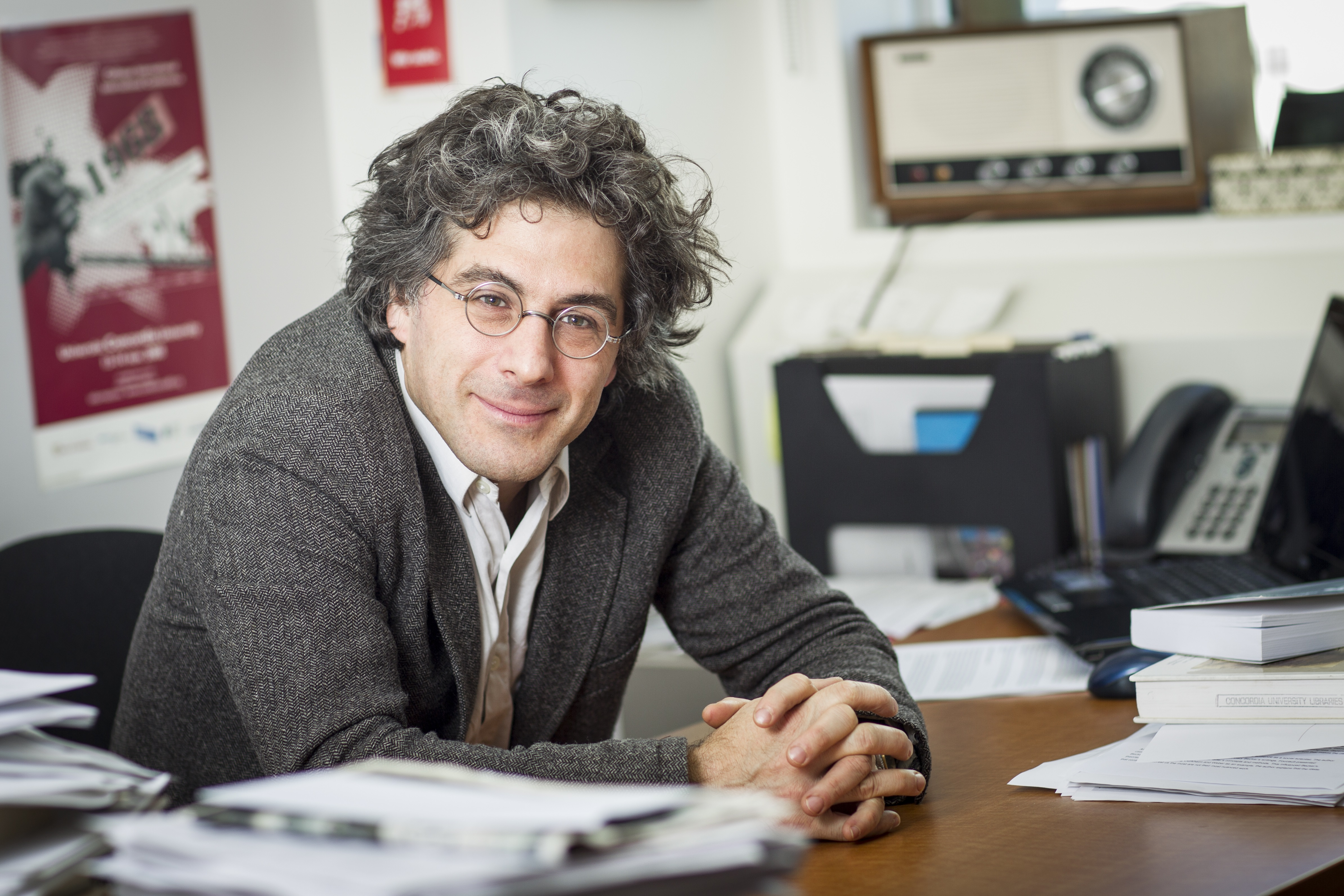
- Dr. Jean-Philippe Warren
- Born: 1970
- Occupation(s): Professor, Sociology and Anthropology

Jean-Philippe Warren (born in 1970) is a Canadian sociologist from Quebec.

== Biography ==
Warren is a professor of sociology at Concordia University, in Montreal, and has degrees from Université Laval; the University of Montreal; and the Ecole Normale Supérieure, in Paris. The history of social sciences, social movements, indigenous peoples, and the Catholic Church are all of particular interest to him. He has written studies on the sociologist Fernand Dumont, the painter Paul-Émile Borduas, and the writer Honoré Beaugrand.

== Selected works ==
- Warren, Jean-Philippe (1998). Un supplément d’âme : Les intentions primordiales de Fernand Dumont (1947-1970), Presses de l'université Laval.
- Warren, Jean-Philippe (2002). Sortir de la Grande Noirceur : L'horizon personnaliste de la Révolution tranquille, Avec E.-Martin Meunier, Septentrion.
- Warren, Jean-Philippe (2003). L'Engagement sociologique : La tradition sociologique du Québec francophone (1886-1955), Boréal.
- Gagné, Gilles et Jean-Philippe Warren (dir.) (2003). Sociologie et valeurs. Quatorze penseurs Québécois du XXème siècle, Les Presses Universitaires de Montréal, Collection corpus.
- Warren, Jean-Philippe (dir.) (2003). La question des races. Une anthologie, Bibliothèque Québécoise.
- Warren, Jean-Philippe (2005). Edmond de Nevers : Portrait d’un intellectuel.
- Warren, Jean-Philippe (2006). Hourra pour Santa Claus : La commercialisation de la saison des fêtes au Québec 1885-1915, Montréal, Boréal.
- Warren, Jean-Philippe (dir.) (2006). Mémoires d'un avenir. Dix utopies qui ont forgé le Québec, Nota Bene.
- Warren, Jean-Philippe et Céline Saint-Pierre (dir.) (2006). Sociologie et société québécoise. Présence de Guy Rocher, PUM.
- Warren, Jean-Philippe (2007). Ils voulaient changer le monde : Le militantisme marxiste-léniniste au Québec, Montréal, VLB.
- Warren, Jean-Philippe (2008). Une douce anarchie : Les années 68 au Québec, Boréal.
- Kemied, Olivier, Pierre Lefebvre et Robert Richard, avec la collaboration d'Evelyne de la Chenelière, Michel Peterson et Jean-Philippe Warren (dir.) (2011). Anthologie Liberté (1959-2009). L'écrivain dans la cité, Le Quartanier.
- Warren, Jean-Philippe (2011). L'art vivant: autour de Paul-Émile Borduas, Boréal.
- Garnier, Xavier et Jean-Philippe Warren (dir.) (2012). Écrivains francophones en exil à Paris. Entre cosmopolitisme et marginalité, Karthala.
- Warren, Jean-Philippe (dir.) (2012). Histoires des sexualités au Québec au XXe siècle, VLB.
- Carel, Ivan, Robert Comeau et Jean-Philippe Warren (dir.) (2013). Violences politiques. Europe et Amérique, 1960-1979, Lux.
- Pâquet, Martin, Matteo Sanfilippo et Jean-Philippe (dir.) (2013). Le Saint-Siège, le Québec et l’Amérique francaise. Les archives vaticanes, pistes et défis, Presses de l'Université Laval.
- Warren, Jean-Philippe (2013). Les prisonniers politiques au Québec, VLB.
- Warren, Jean-Philippe (2015). Honoré Beaugrand. La plume et l'épée (1848-1906), Boréal.
- Warren, Jean-Philippe (2015). Discours et pratiques de la contreculture au Québec, Avec Andrée Fortin, Septentrion.
- Warren, Jean-Philippe et Bruno Dumons (dir.) (2015). Les zouaves pontificaux en France, en Belgique et au Québec. La mise en récit d'une expérience historique transnationale (XIXe-XX siècle), Peter Lang.
- Warren, Jean-Philippe (dir.) (2015). Les soldats du Pape. Les zouaves canadiens entre l'Europe et l'Amérique, Québec, Presses de l'Université Laval.

== Awards and recognitions ==
- 2015. Governor General's Award for French-language non-fiction
- 2014. The Canadian History of Education Association Founders' Prize (ACHÉ-CHEA)
- 2004. Michel-Brunet Prize
- 2004. Clio Prize (Quebec)

== Journals and periodicals ==
- Bulletin d'histoire politique
- Liberté
- The Canadian Historical Review
- Recherches sociographiques
