= Régine Robin =

Canadian writer (1939–2021)

Régine Robin (born as Rivka Ajzersztejn; 10 December 1939 – 3 February 2021) was a historian, novelist, translator and professor of sociology. Her prolific fiction and non-fiction, primarily on the themes of identity and culture and on the sociological practice of literature, earned a number of awards, including the Governor-General's Award in 1986. She was described by Robert Saletti as "Montreal's grande dame of postmodernism".

== Career ==
Régine Robin's published works include La Société française en 1789 : Semur-en-Auxois (1970); Le Cheval blanc de Lénine (1979); La Québécoite (1983), translated in 1989 as The Wanderer (Martin and Beatrice Fischer Prize for Fiction); Le Réalisme socialiste: Une esthétique impossible (1987, Governor-General's Award), translated by Stanford University Press in 1992 as Socialist Realism: An Impossible Aesthetic; Kafka (1989); L'immense fatigue des pierres (2001, Grand Prix du Livre de la Ville de Montréal), a collection of stories; Berlin chantiers (2001, Grand Prix du livre de la Ville de Montréal); La mémoire saturée (2003); and Cybermigrances: Traversées fugitives (2004).

Régine Robin was born to Jewish-Polish parents in Paris. She held degrees from the Sorbonne in geography (1962) and history (1963) and doctorates from the Université de Dijon (1969) and the École des hautes études en sciences sociales de Paris (1989). She began her career as a history teacher in a Dijon lycée (1963–1967) and then lecturer at Université Paris X, but immigrated to Montreal in 1977. She took up her post as a sociology professor at the Université du Québec à Montreal in 1982, and co-founded Montreal's Inter-University Centre for Discourse Analysis and Sociocriticism of Texts in 1990.

Régine Robin died in Montreal on 3 February 2021, aged 81.

== Honours ==
- In 1988 she was admitted to the Royal Society of Canada.
- In 1994 she was made a Chevalier of the Ordre des Palmes Académiques (France).
- In 1994 she received the Prix Jacques-Rousseau (Acfas) for interdisciplinary contributions.
