= John Herd Thompson =

Canadian historian (1946–2019)

John Herd Thompson (1946 – July 12, 2019) was a Canadian historian.

Thompson was born in Winnipeg, Manitoba and earned a Ph.D. from Queen's University in 1975.

He became an authoratative historian of Canada, and taught North American history at a variety of universities, including Simon Fraser University, McGill University, and Duke University during a 40-year teaching career. After retiring from Duke in 2012, he moved to British Columbia. He died from lung cancer in July 2019.

== Works ==
- The Harvests of War: The Prairie West, 1914-1918; McClelland & Stewart; 1978.
- Canada 1922-1939: Decades of Discord along, co-authored with Allen Seager; Penguin Random House;1985. Best non-fiction book finalist,1985 Governor General's Award for English-language non-fiction.
- Canada and the United States Ambivalent Allies, co-authored with Stephen J. Randall; McGill-Queen's University Press;1994.
- British Columbia Land of Promises, co-authored with Patricia Roy; Oxford University Press; 2005.
