= Paul Seesequasis =

Canadian writer and journalist

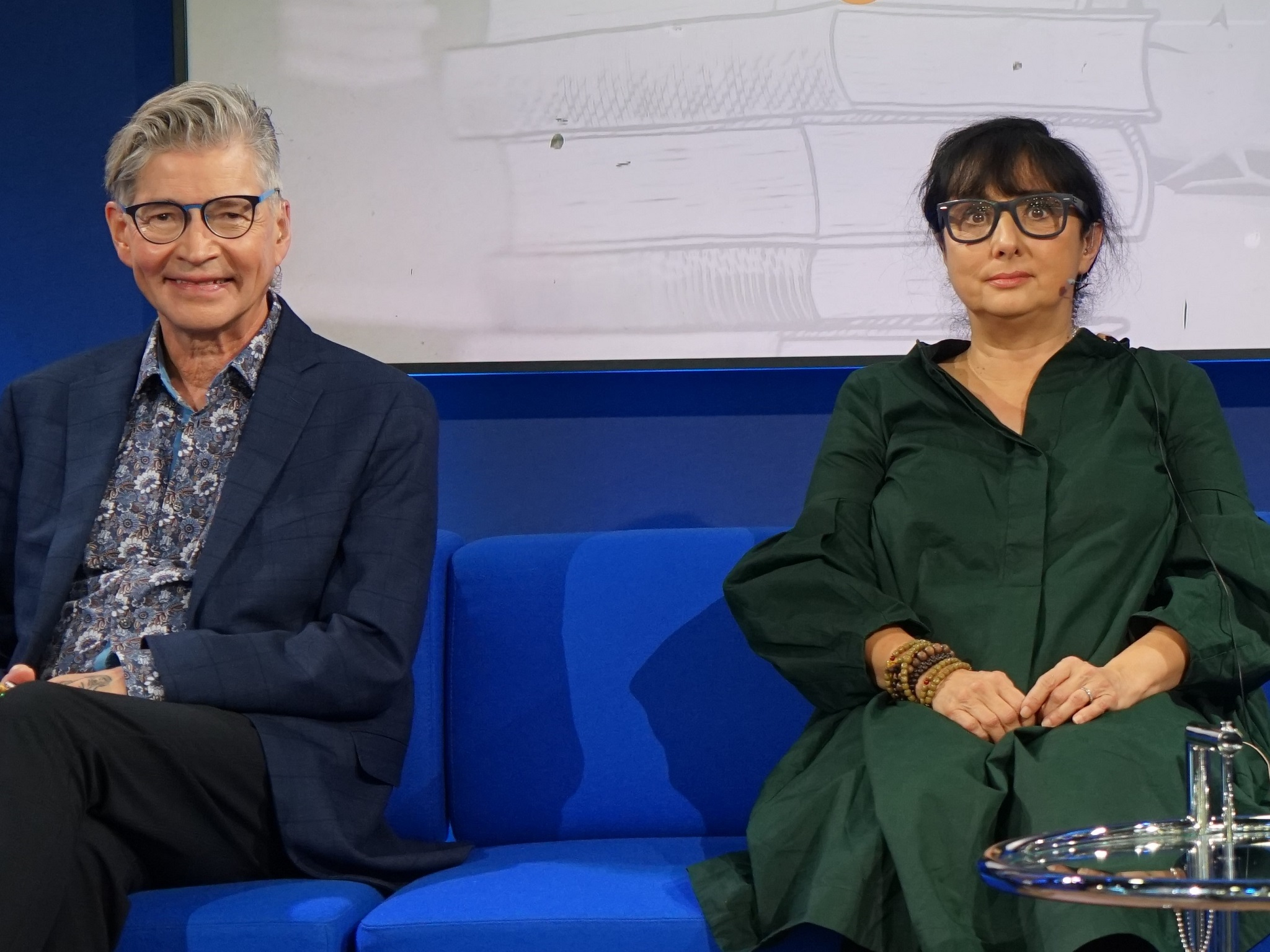
Paul Seesequasis and Catherine Mavrikakis, 2021

Paul Seesequasis is a Canadian writer and journalist. He is a member of the Plains Cree First Nation from Saskatchewan. The founder of Aboriginal Voices magazine, he is best known for his three-year social media project of posting images of Indigenous peoples of Canada.

== Photography ==
The Indigenous Archival Photo Project was initially inspired by his mother, an Indian residential school survivor who once commented that she wanted to see more stories about the strength and resilience of Indigenous communities. With that in mind, he began searching various archives and museums to locate photos of Indigenous people, choosing and posting images which conveyed positive and empowering and affirming messages about Indigenous community life. In some cases, his posts have led to successful identification of the people depicted in the photographs, whose names were not always recorded in the archives.

In January 2017, Seesequasis signed a deal with the Canadian division of Penguin Random House to publish the photographs in book form. The book, titled Blanket Toss Under Midnight Sun, released in October 2019, will include a written component documenting the context of the photographs, the subjects and the photographers.

== Publishing and Editing ==
Paul was a founding editor of Aboriginal Voices, an award-winning magazine founded in 1993, and was an editor at Theytus Press, the longest Indigenous publishing house in Canada. He was also a recipient of the Maclean-Hunter journalism award.

== Works ==
- Heather Elton, Paul Seesequasis, Florene Belmore, edd.: Chinook Winds. Aboriginal Dance Project. Banff Centre, 1997
- Jodie Renner, ed.: Voices from the Valleys: Stories and Poems about life in BC's Interior. Authors: Cheryl Kaye Tardif, Kristina Stanley, R. M. Greenaway, James Osborne, Virginia Carraway Stark, Paul Seesequasis, Bernie Fandrich. Cobalt, 2015'
- He published the novella Tobacco Wars in 2010.
- Editor of Staking Land Claims, 1999, with Patricia Deadman.
- Editor of Jimmy Tames Horses, by Garry Gottfriedson, Kegedonce Press, 2012.
- Blanket Toss Under Midnight Sun, Knopf, 2019
  - (in German) transl. Leon Mengden: Unter der Mitternachtssonne. Porträts indigener Gemeinschaften in Kanada. btb, Munich 2020 (including photographs 1920–1970)
  - (in English), excerpt: Granta 141, special Canada, September 2017, same title, pp 176 (text), 177-192 (photos)−
