= Philippe Broussard =

French journalist (born 1963)

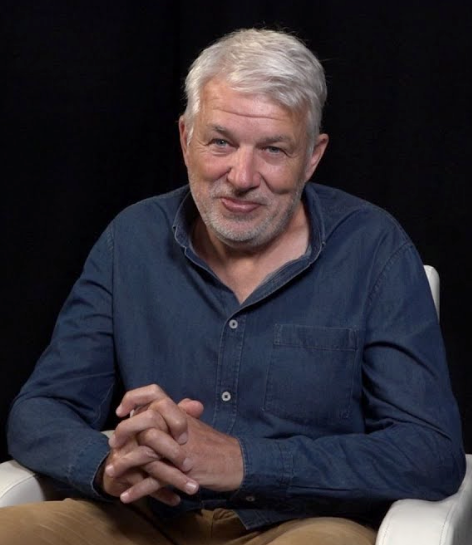
- In a 2025 interview
- Born: 20 June 1963 (age 62); Paris, France
- Occupations: Journalist, author
- Family: Robert Broussard (father)

Philippe Broussard (born 20 June 1963) is a French journalist who is laureate of the Albert Londres Prize (1993). He wrote for the newspaper Le Monde. He is the son of police commissioner Robert Broussard.

== Biography ==
He was born in Paris, the son of Robert Broussard, a famous police commissioner.

After graduating from the Lycée Auguste-Renoir in Asnières-sur-Seine (Hauts-de-Seine), Philippe Broussard studied English and history at the Paris Nanterre University and then at Sorbonne Nouvelle University. He began his career in journalism as an intern at France-Soir, then as editor of the leading alternative fanzine of the day, New Wave.

In 1983, he joined the Centre de formation des journalistes (CFJ), graduating in 1985. He then joined Le Matin de Paris, for which he covered the tragedy at the Heysel stadium in Brussels, prior to the Liverpool-Juventus soccer match. Appointed head of the sports department at Le Matin de Paris, he surrounded himself with three other CFJ graduates from the same class (1985): Claude Askolovitch, Pascal Ceaux and Gilles van Kote.

From 1985 to 1987, Philippe Broussard covered various events for Le Matin de Paris. A specialist in the world of soccer fans and the skinhead movement, he devoted numerous reports to hooliganism. In August 1987, along with Askolovitch, Ceaux and Van Kote, he joined the editorial staff of the daily Le Sport, a competitor of L'Équipe. Ten months later, when this newspaper disappeared, he worked as a freelancer for five months.

After a brief spell as a reporter at France Info, he joined Le Monde on 1 January 1989 as a reporter in the sports department. He covered numerous events: 1990 FIFA World Cup, European finals, 1991 Rugby World Cup, 1992 Albertville Winter Olympics.

In 1990, Philippe Broussard published his first book, Génération Supporter. The book had a major impact on French ultras. In May 1992, Philippe Broussard was injured in the Stade Armand-Cesari in Bastia. On his return to Le Monde's editorial staff in September, he became a reporter in the General Information department, under Edwy Plenel. In May 1993, a series of long articles on the tragic odyssey of African stowaways aboard a Ukrainian cargo ship earned him the prestigious Albert Londres Prize.

During this period, he also managed the skinhead band R.A.S. and founded the punk record label Fomb Records.

In 2002, Philippe Broussard collaborated on a biography of the former captain of the France national football team, Marcel Desailly. After serving as deputy editor-in-chief and then editor-in-chief of the "Horizons" department, he left Le Monde in 2005 to become a senior reporter in the "foreign" department of the weekly L'Express. A year later, at the request of the magazine's new managing editor, Christophe Barbier, he took over as head of the "society-sciences" department.

In early 2009,Christophe Barbier entrusted him with the management of L'Express's "Investigations" department.

In January 2016, Philippe Broussard left L'Express to become a freelance journalist and regular contributor to M, Le Monde magazine. He is also the author of several books and director of a collection at Stock.

He also directed two documentaries in the "Instantané d'histoire" collection broadcast on Arte in spring 2017.

On 1 September 2017, he joined Le Monde full-time as deputy editorial director.

From 2020 to 2024, he carried out an investigation for Le Monde into the mysterious author of thousands of clandestine photos taken in Paris during the Occupation, identifying him as Raoul Minot, a Printemps store employee. It was published in Le Monde from 12 to 17 August 2024, as a series of five episodes.

== Works ==
- (in French) Philippe Broussard, Génération supporter, Robert Laffont, 1990, 376 p. (ISBN 2221069145)
- (in French) Philippe Broussard, Les Rebelles de l'Himalaya, Denoël, 1996, 250 p. (ISBN 2207241033)
- (in French) Philippe Broussard and Danielle Laeng, La prisonnière de Lhassa, Stock, 2001, 250 p. (ISBN 978-2-234-05401-1)
- (in French) Marcel Desailly, Capitaine, Stock, 2002, 350 p. (ISBN 2234054788)
- (in French) Robert Broussard and Philippe Broussard, Commissaire Broussard : Mémoires, Stock, 2005 (ISBN 2234058341)
- (in French) Philippe Broussard et Jean-Marie Pontaut, Les Grandes affaires de la Cinquième République, L'Express, 18 novembre 2010, 494 p. (ISBN 2843437601)
- (in French) Philippe Broussard, La disparue de San Juan, Stock, 2011, 435 p. (ISBN 9782234062511)
- (in French) Philippe Broussard, Vivre cent jours en un, Stock, 2015, 240 p. (ISBN 9782234075467)
- (in French) Philippe Broussard, À la recherche de Ginka, 2018, 272 p. (ISBN 9782234081802)
