= 14, rue de Galais =

Canadian television series

- Genre: téléroman
- Written by: André Giroux
- Directed by: Jean Boisvert; Georges Delanoë; Denys Gagnon
- Starring: Paul Hébert; Mimi D'Estée; Robert Gadouas
- Country of origin: Canada
- Original language: French
- No. of seasons: 3
- No. of episodes: 125

Original release
- Network: CBC
- Release: February 23, 1954 – 1957

14, rue de Galais (English: 14 Galais Road) is a Canadian television series which ran from 1954 until 1957. Guggenheim Fellow and Montyon Prize winner André Giroux was credited with being a writer for the series.

The series is about the Delisles, a middle class Montreal family.

== Synopsis ==
This series features the many stories of a bourgeois Montreal family: the Delisles.

Father Henri is a civil engineer with a comfortable salary and high social status. They have three children: Hélène, a young girl; Paul, a schoolboy determined to follow in his father's footsteps; and Louis, a university student. Also living with the family is Albert, their sympathetic, intelligent, even-tempered uncle.
