= Philip Kreiner =

Canadian writer (born 1950)

- Born: 1950 (age 75–76); Timmins, Ontario, Canada
- Occupations: novelist, short story writer
- Writing career
- Period: 1980s
- Notable work: People Like Us in a Place Like This

Philip Kreiner (born 1950 in Timmins, Ontario) is a Canadian writer, whose short story collection People Like Us in a Place Like This was a nominee for the Governor General's Award for English-language fiction at the 1983 Governor General's Awards.

He published two further novels, Heartlands and Contact Prints, in the 1980s. All three works were drawn from Kreiner's own experience as a teacher who had worked in Cree communities in far Northern Ontario and in Jamaica.

== Works ==
- People Like Us in a Place Like This (1983, ISBN 978-0887504679)
- Heartlands (1984, ISBN 978-0887505577)
- Contact Prints (1987, ISBN 978-0770422486)
