= 1985 Governor General's Awards =

Canadian literary award

Each winner of the 1985 Governor General's Awards for Literary Merit was selected by a panel of judges administered by the Canada Council for the Arts.

== English ==
Category	Winner	Nominated
Fiction	Margaret Atwood, The Handmaid's Tale	Sharon Butala, Queen of the Headaches; Keath Fraser, Foreign Affairs; David Adams Richards, Road to the Stilt House
Non-fiction	Ramsay Cook, The Regenerators: Social Criticism in Late Victorian English Canada	Michael D. Behiels, Prelude to Quebec's Quiet Revolution: Liberalism versus Neo-nationalism; John Herd Thompson, Canada 1922-1939: Decades of Discord; P. B. Waite, The Man from Halifax: Sir John Thompson, Prime Minister
Poetry	Fred Wah, Waiting for Saskatchewan	Lorna Crozier, The Garden Going on Without Us; Richard Lush, A Manual for Lying Down; Anne Szumigalski, Instar
Drama	George F. Walker, Criminals in Love	David French, Salt-Water Moon; Margaret Hollingsworth, War Babies (in Willful Acts: Five Plays); Ken Mitchell, Gone the Burning Sun

== French ==
Category	Winner	Nominated
Fiction	Fernand Ouellette, Lucie ou un midi en novembre	Louise Bouchard, Les Images; Jean-Paul Fugère, Popa moman et le saint homme; Suzanne Paradis, La Ligne bleue
Non-fiction	François Ricard, La littérature contre elle-même	Lysiane Gagnon, Chroniques politiques; Hélène Pelletier-Baillargeon, Marie Gérin-Lajoie
Poetry	André Roy, Action writing	Anne-Marie Alonzo, Bleus de mine; François Charron, La vie n'a pas de sens; Patrice Desbiens, Dans l'après-midi cardiaque; Paul Chanel Malenfant, Les noms du père, suivi de Lieux dits: Italique
Drama	Maryse Pelletier, Duo pour voix obstinées	Michel Marc Bouchard, La poupée de Pélopia; Francine Noël, Chandeleur
