= Leslie Hall Pinder =

Canadian lawyer and writer (born 1948)

- Born: Leslie Joyce Hall; 21 September 1948; Elrose, Saskatchewan, Canada
- Died: 12 June 2021 (aged 72)
- Education: University of Saskatchewan; Dalhousie University; University of British Columbia (LL.B.)
- Occupations: Lawyer, novelist
- Partner: Catherine Wedge
- Writing career
- Notable works: Under the House; On Double Tracks; Bring Me One of Everything; The Indulgence

Leslie Joyce Hall Pinder (née Hall) (born 21 September 1948, died 12 June 2021) was a Canadian lawyer and writer.

== Early life and education ==
Leslie Joyce Hall was born in Elrose, Saskatchewan, to Ray Hall and Margaret Rathwell. Ross Pinder was her adoptive father. She had five siblings: Jeff, Janet, Terri, Doug, and Paul. She lived in Toronto for three years while her father was at the University of Toronto, then spent the rest of her childhood in Saskatoon. She played basketball and competed in speed skating while attending Walter Murray Collegiate Institute. In 1965, she won the Saskatchewan junior golf championship.

Pinder studied English literature at the University of Saskatchewan and Dalhousie University, earning a Bachelor of Arts in 1968. She worked as a court recorder while studying law and earned her Bachelor of Laws from the University of British Columbia in 1976.

== Legal career ==
In 1978, Pinder commenced work for the Union of B.C. Indian Chiefs, as in-house counsel. In 1982, she formed her own firm, Mandell Pinder LLP, working almost exclusively for Indian people.

After the publication of On Double Tracks, Pinder focused on her legal work, primarily on First Nations land claims in British Columbia; a few years ago, she turned to writing full-time.

== Literary career ==
=== Early writing ===
A teacher encouraged Pinder to write when she was 12. At 19, she had her first short story broadcast on CBC Radio.

In 1982, Lazara Press published her prose poem entitled "35 Stones" in broadside and postcard format.

Pinder's first novel, Under the House (1986) garnered superior reviews, and her second novel, On Double Tracks (1990), was short-listed for the 1990 Governor General's Award for English Fiction.

==== Under the House ====
The novel focuses on the Rathbones, a prominent Saskatchewan family so determined not to look back at their past that they never see the chains binding them to it. The story unfolds primarily through the eyes of a niece, related by marriage rather than blood, and her aunt, both ostracized by the family patriarch, a misguided and controlling man intent on eliminating any 'outsiders' from sharing in the grandfather's estate. Pinder deals with the topic of incest delicately, and without setting up a stereotypical good-and-evil dichotomy, one of the many reasons the novel earned the respect of reviewers and colleagues, among them, the critic for The New York Times, who described Under the House as ". . . a brave work," and Margaret Atwood, who viewed Pinder as ". . . a writer of great talent and sensitivity . . ." Pinder's inspiration for the story was a rumour about a hidden relationship between two of her own family members.

Pinder's first novel Under The House (1986) was re-created for the Vancouver stage for the Women in View Festival in 1990, a one-woman performance by Trish Grainge, directed by Jane Heyman.

==== On Double Tracks ====
The inspiration for Pinder's second novel On Double Tracks (1988, short-listed for the 1990 Canadian Governor General's Award for English Fiction) came, in part, from the treatment she received by the judge hearing one of her native land claims cases. In the novel, a young woman lawyer goes to court to reclaim land for a native Band, but from the outset of the trial, things go badly, and a disturbing level of confrontation builds. When the young lawyer and the aging judge journey back to their childhoods, it becomes clear that the courtroom drama merely brushes the surface of both wider and more personal dramas. Both characters head for psychological crises, but only one survives the wreckage.

==== Themes and style ====
In both novels, Pinder uses the courtroom as a forum of conflict and disclosure, a place where truth can be told, but not without revealing tragic flaws. Pinder's work explores the currency of secrets, particularly when two or more people conspire to keep them: the currency of intimacy, solidarity and allegiance, but in reality, secrets as the termites gnawing at the foundations of families and lives until their structures are destroyed. Illegitimacy is a recurring theme in her work and a stand-in for one's feelings of being an outsider.

Pinder's writing style has been compared to Faulkner in its depiction of the fictional unconscious, her prose both stark and subtle, intense and compassionate.

=== Later novels ===
Her third novel, "Bring Me One of Everything" (2012) has received excellent notices, including a starred review in Publishers Weekly. John Hulcoop in The Vancouver Sun referred to her as one of the "great magicians in literature". She published a fourth novel, The Indulgence.

== Personal life ==
She lived part-time in urban Vancouver and on an island in British Columbia.

== Death ==
Pinder died on 12 June 2021 at the age of 72. She was survived by her partner, Catherine Wedge, and her five siblings.

== Works ==
=== Novels ===
- Under the House. Vancouver: Talon Books, 1986. Bloomsbury Publishing put out the first hardcover printing in the U.K. This was followed by an edition in the U.S., a translation into Finnish, softcover by Faber & Faber and finally another Random House Vintage edition in Canada. This novel has been revised and re-published by Shelfstealers, Inc. as an ebook and trade paperback (2012) with the audio book to be released in 2013.
- On Double Tracks. Toronto: Lester & Orpen Dennys (Canada) and Bloomsbury Publishing (UK), 1990. Short-listed for the Canadian Governor General's Award for Fiction in 1990. In 1991 softcover rights were sold to Random House in Canada. To be re-published in e-book and audio book formats by Shelfstealers, LLC, in 2011.
- Bring Me One of Everything. Grey Swan Press, 2012

=== Chapbook ===
- The Carriers of No - Vancouver: Lazara Press, 1991.

=== Selected writings ===
- Selected Writings of Leslie Hall Pinder, The Legal Studies Forum, Volume XXXI, Supp., 2007, College of Law, West Virginia University, ed. James R. Elkins. Includes selections from Pinder's writing, including the courtroom scenes from "On Double Tracks," a reprint of essays and a long verse poem, "The World is as Sharp as a Knife." The volume also contains an introduction by Elkins and excerpts from their correspondence.
