= Diane Keating =

Canadian writer (born 1940)

- Born: 1940 (age 85–86); Winnipeg, Manitoba
- Occupations: poet, novelist
- Writing career
- Period: 1970s–present
- Notable work: No Birds or Flowers

Diane Keating is a Canadian writer. She is most noted for her poetry collection No Birds or Flowers, which was a shortlisted nominee for the Governor General's Award for English-language poetry at the 1982 Governor General's Awards. She published two further poetry collections in the 1980s, as well as the career anthology The Year One: New and Selected Poems in 2001.

In 1989, her short story "The Crying Out" was published in the Journey Prize anthology, and in 1991, she was a Journey Prize finalist for her short story "The Salem Letters". Both stories were excerpts from a novel in progress, which was originally slated for publication in 1992 but was withdrawn at that time and was not published until 2014.

Born and raised in Winnipeg, Manitoba, she was educated at the University of Manitoba.

== Works ==
- In Dark Places (1978)
- No Birds or Flowers (1982)
- Mad Apples (1983)
- The Optic Heart (1984)
- The Year One: New and Selected Poems (2001)
- The Crying Out (2014)
