= Shakespeare's Dog =

1983 novel by Leon Rooke

- Author: Leon Rooke
- Language: English
- Publisher: Stoddart Publishing
- Publication date: 1983
- Publication place: Don Mills, Toronto, Ontario, Canada
- Media type: Print (hardcover, paperback)
- Pages: 158
- ISBN: 978-0-7737-2011-4
- OCLC: 10439426
- Preceded by: The Birth Control King of the Upper Volta
- Followed by: A Bolt of White Cloth

Shakespeare's Dog is a 1983 novel by Canadian writer Leon Rooke. The novel tells the story of William Shakespeare's early career, including his aspirations to break through to popular success as a writer and his courtship and eventual marriage to Anne Hathaway, from the perspective of Hooker, Shakespeare's pet dog.

The novel won the Governor General's Award for English-language fiction at the 1983 Governor General's Awards, and was a shortlisted finalist for the Stephen Leacock Memorial Medal for Humour.

A 20th-anniversary edition of the novel was reissued in 2003 by Dundurn Press.

It was later adapted for the stage by playwright Rick Chafe, premiering at the National Arts Centre in conjunction with the Manitoba Theatre Centre in 2008.
