= Hélène Pelletier-Baillargeon =

Canadian writer (1932–2025)

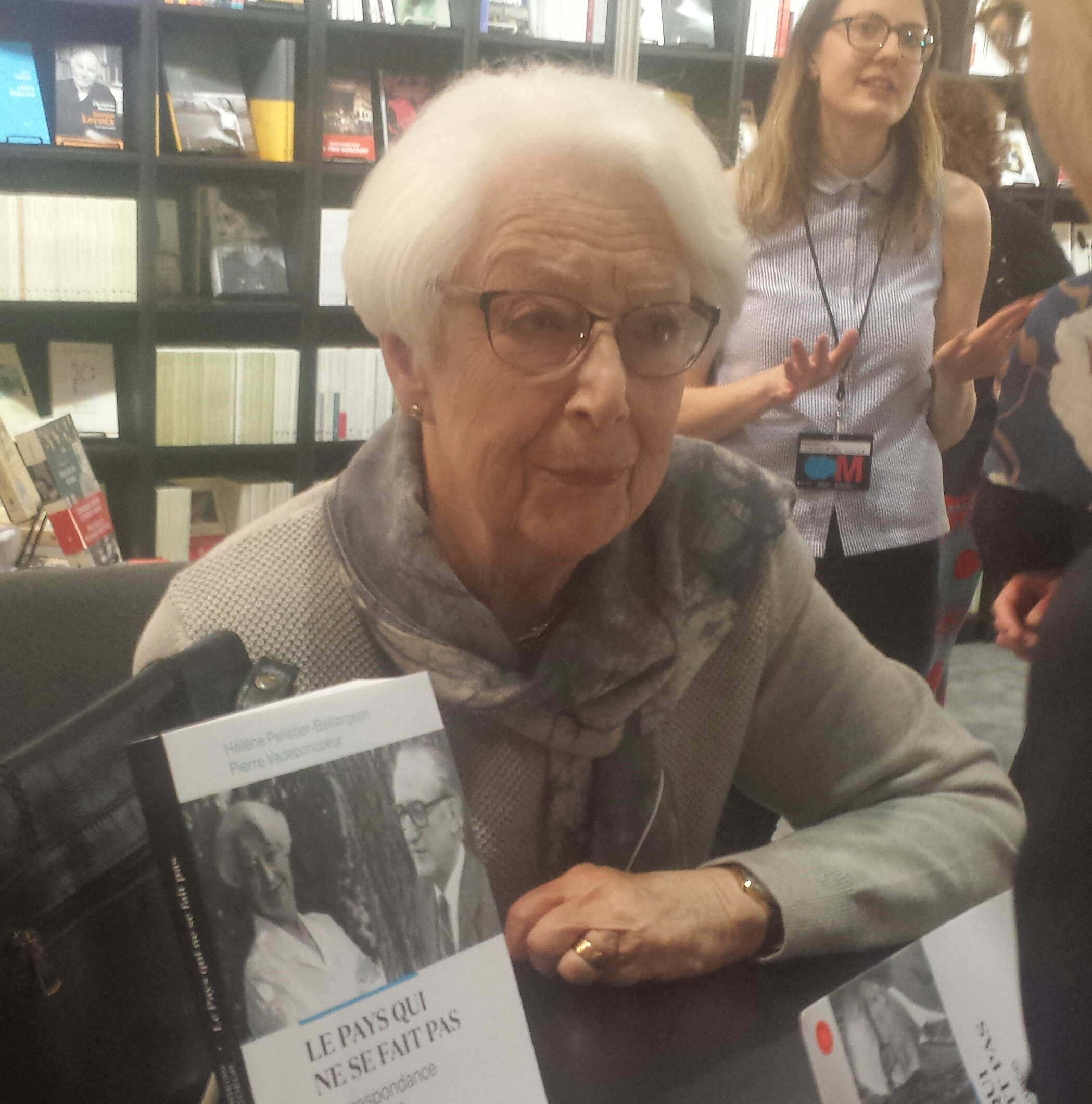
- Born: Hélène Pelletier; 1932; Montreal, Québec, Canada
- Died: February 14, 2025 (aged 92)
- Education: Université de Montréal; Sorbonne; School for Advanced Studies in the Social Sciences
- Occupations: Femme de lettres; journalist; essayist; biographer
- Known for: Being political advisor (1981–1983) to Minister Camille Laurin, in the area of education
- Awards: 1985, Finalist, Prix du Gouverneur général; 1985, Prix Maxime-Raymond; 1991, Member, Conseil supérieur de la langue française; 1999, Knight, National Order of Québec; 2002, Prix Odyssée; 2011, Prix Rosaire-Morin Prize

Hélène Pelletier-Baillargeon (1932 – February 14, 2025) was a Canadian femme de lettres, journalist, essayist, and biographer from Québec.

== Background ==
Hélène Pelletier was born in Montreal in 1932, the daughter of Dominique Pelletier, notary (1892–1950). Her uncle, Georges Pelletier (1882–1950), was director of Le Devoir from 1932 to 1947.

After obtaining a Master of Arts degree from the Université de Montréal in 1954, she completed two years of post-graduate studies, from 1957 to 1959, at the Sorbonne and at the School for Advanced Studies in the Social Sciences, and did research at the Bibliothèque nationale de France for a doctorate in literature, with a doctoral thesis in stylistics devoted to the work of François Mauriac. She published Volume II of Olivar Asselin and His Time (2001), with Volume III currently in preparation for the Dictionary of Canadian Biography.

Pelletier-Baillargeon died on February 14, 2025, at the age of 92.

== Career ==
When she returned to Quebec, she joined the editorial team of the magazine, Maintain, from its founding in 1962. A Dominican magazine administered by lay people from 1969, it came under Pelletier's direction in 1973 and closed in 1974.

She was a freelance journalist from 1974 to 1981, including at Châtelaine as a political and union columnist, at the magazine Critère, as vice-president of the Board of Directors and editor, as well as at Le Devoir, Revue Desjardins, Communauté chrétienne, La Presse, Possibles, and others. From 1981 to 1983, she was a political advisor to the Quebec Minister of Education, Camille Laurin, on the issue of denominational education. She was a weekly columnist for La Presse from 1986 to 1989. She continued to participate in a large number of collective works and cultural, historical and religious periodicals in Quebec and Canada. She participated in many conferences as a guest speaker on education, the status of women, ecclesial life, family or cultural politics.

In addition, she participated in several organizations of social, educational and cultural interest including the Board of Directors of the Montreal Museum of Fine Arts, Conseil supérieur de l'éducation du Québec, Conseil des affaires sociales de l'Assemblée des évêques du Québec, Board of Directors of the Lionel-Groulx Foundation, Board of Directors of Éditions Fides, among others. She was a member of the Union des écrivaines et des écrivains québécois.

== Awards and honours ==
- 1985, Finalist, Prix du Gouverneur général
- 1985, Prix Maxime-Raymond
- 1991, Member, Conseil supérieur de la langue française
- 1999, Knight, National Order of Quebec
- 2002, Prix Odyssée
- 2011, Prix Rosaire-Morin Prize, awarded by the Ligue d'action nationale (chaired by Denis Monière) (she is the first recipient of this new prize)
- 2011, 3rd Prize of the Presidency of the National Assembly for the book Olivar Asselin et son temps, volume 3, Le maître

== Selected works ==
- Une nouvelle morale sexuelle, Montréal, Fides, 1976, ISBN 978-0-7755-0601-3
- Contemplation ou Le Carmel De Montréal : ses racines, sa spiritualité, sa vie, Montréal, Éditions Fides, 1977, ISBN 978-0-7755-0632-7
- Le pays légitime, Montréal, Leméac, : Collection « À hauteur d'homme », 1979, ISBN 978-2-7609-5503-5
- Marie Gérin-Lajoie : de mère en fille, la cause des femmes, Montréal, Éditions du Boréal, 1985, ISBN 2-8905-2145-1
- Simonne Monet-Chartrand : un héritage et des projets (dir. Hélène Pelletier-Baillargeon), Montréal : Fides, Montréal : Éditions du Remue-ménage, 1993, ISBN 978-2-8909-1122-2
- Olivar Asselin et son temps :
  - [volume 1] Le militant, Montréal, Fides, 1996, ISBN 978-2-7621-1889-6
  - [volume 2] Le volontaire, Montréal, Fides, 2001, ISBN 978-2-7621-2129-2
  - [volume 3] Le maître, Montréal, Fides, 2010, ISBN 978-2-7621-3026-3
- presentation of : Jules Fournier, Mon encrier, Montréal, Bibliothèque québécoise, 1996, ISBN 978-2-8940-6129-9
- in : Vingt années de recherches en éthique et de débats au Québec Montréal, Fides, 1997, ISBN 2-7621-1940-5
- Bernard Andrès, Stéphane-Albert Boulais, John Hare, Marcel Olscamp, Hélène Pelletier-Baillargeon, François Ricard, Lucie Robert, Patricia Smart, Robert Vigneault, Approches de la biographie au Québec (dir. Dominique Lafon, Rainier Grutman, Marcel Olscamp et Robert Vigneault), Montréal, Fides, Collection « Archives des lettres canadiennes », 2004, ISBN 978-2-7621-2591-7
- presentation of : Olivar Asselin, L'Œuvre de l'abbé Groulx,, Montréal, Fides, 2007, ISBN 978-2-7621-2806-2
