= Catherine Mavrikakis =

Canadian academic and writer

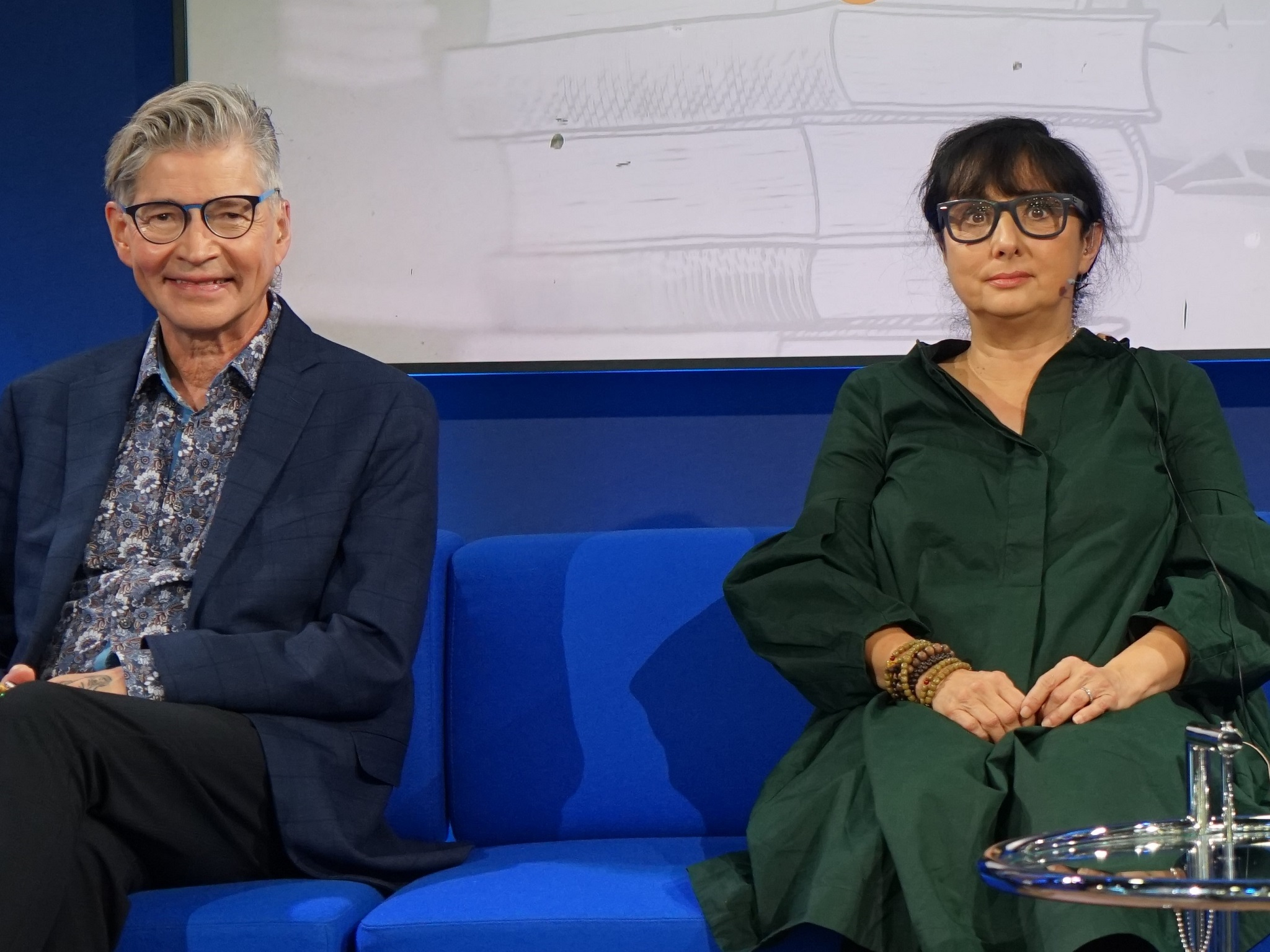
Catherine Mavrikakis and Paul Seesequasis, 2021

Catherine Mavrikakis (born January 7, 1961) is a Canadian academic and writer living in Quebec.

The daughter of a Greek father who grew up in Algeria and a French mother, she was born in Chicago and grew up in Anjou, Montréal-Nord, St. Leonard, in France and in the United States. She settled in Montreal in 1979. From 1993 to 2003, she taught at Concordia University. In 2003, she joined the department of French language literature at the Université de Montréal.

The 2015 virtual reality work The Unknown Photographer incorporated text by Mavrikakis.

== Selected works ==
- Deuils cannibales et mélancoliques, novel (2000)
- Ça va aller, novel (2002)
- Fleurs de crachat, novel (2005), translated into English by Nathanaël as Flowers of Spit (2011) which was shortlisted for a ReLit Award
- Condamner à mort. Le meurtre et la loi à l'écran, essay (2005), received the Prix Victor-Barbeau and was shortlisted for a Governor General's Award for Literary Merit in 2006
- Le ciel de Bay City, novel (2008), received the Grand prix du livre de Montréal, the Prix des libraires du Québec and the Prix littéraire des collégiens
- Omaha Beach, play (2008), shortlisted for a Governor General's Award for Literary Merit in 2008
- Les derniers jours de Smokey Nelson, novel (2011), shortlisted for the Governor General's Award for French-language fiction
- Ce que dit l'écorce (2014), with Nicolas Lévesque
