= André Giroux (writer) =

Canadian writer (1916 – 1977)

- Born: December 10, 1916; Quebec City, Quebec, Canada
- Died: July 28, 1977 (aged 60)
- Occupation: Writer
- Writing career
- Language: French
- Notable works: Malgré tout, la joie
- Notable awards: 1949 - Montyon Prize of the French Academy; 1950 - Province of Quebec Prize; 1952 - Guggenheim Fellowship; 1959 - Governor General's Award for French language fiction

André Giroux (December 10, 1916 – July 28, 1977) was a Canadian writer of fiction. Giroux authored Malgré tout, la joie, a series of short stories for which he received the Governor General's Award for French Canadian literature in 1959, as presented by the Canada Council. He was also a Montyon Prize winner.

Giroux was born in Quebec City, Quebec. A member of the Royal Society of Canada, he died following an automobile accident in 1977.

== List of literary works ==
- Au-delà des visages / Beyond the Faces (1948 novel)
- Le gouffre a toujours soif / The Bottomless Pit (1953 novel)
- 14, rue de Galais / 14 Galais street (television series, 1954–57)
- Malgré tout, la joie / Despite Everything, the Joy! (1958) — Winner, 1959 Governor General's Awards

André Giroux also authored articles in newspapers under the pseudonym Rene de Villers.

== Biographies ==
- Analytical Bibliography of Andre Giroux, Yvette Giroux, 1949
- Andre Giroux - the writer, the man, the poet, Mado of Isle, the Editions Arion, 1994

== Awards and honours ==
- 1949 - Montyon Prize of the French Academy
- 1950 - Province of Quebec Prize
- 1952 - Guggenheim Fellowship
- 1959 - Governor General's Award for French language fiction
