= Brian T. Fitch =

Brian T. Fitch (19.11.1935 - 15.12.2023) was a british non-fiction author, and professor of French in Toronto at Trinity College. He was nominated for a 2000 Governor General's Award for À l'ombre de la littérature and a 2004 Governor General's Award for Le langage de la pensée et l'écriture : Humboldt, Valéry, Beckett. He was a member of the Royal Society of Canada since 1976.
