= Marcel Fournier (sociologist) =

Québécoise sociologist (born 1945)

- Born: August 16, 1945 (age 80); Plessiville, Quebec
- Occupation: Sociologist

Marcel Fournier, born in 1945 in Plessisville (Quebec) is a Quebec sociologist.

== Biography ==
Born in Plessisville, Marcel Fournier completed his classical course at the Collège de Lévis before undertaking studies in sociology at the Université de Montréal. He completed a master's thesis there under the direction of Marcel Rioux, before going to do his doctorate in France at the École Pratique des Hautes Études, under the direction of Pierre Bourdieu. Following the completion of his doctorate in 1974, Marcel Fournier was hired as a professor at the Université de Montréal, where he spent most of his career.

His work focuses on the sociology of culture, the sociology of science, sociological theory and the history of sociology. He is particularly recognized for his work on French sociology and its history, of which he has become one of the most eminent specialists. His biographies of Marcel Mauss and Émile Durkheim are notably references.

In 2013, he won the Prix Léon-Gérin, a Prix du Québec recognizing the exceptional career of a scientist working in a social science discipline.

== Selected bibliography ==
- Fournier, Marcel (1979). Communisme et anticommunisme au Québec : 1920-1950 (in French) (Editions coopératives Albert Saint-Martin ed.). Éditions coopératives Albert Saint-Martin. ISBN 978-2-89035-007-6.
- Lamont, Michèle; Fournier, Marcel (1992). Cultivating Differences : Symbolic Boundaries and the Making of Inequality. University of Chicago Press. p. 346. ISBN 978-0-226-46814-3.
- Fournier, Marcel (1994). Marcel Mauss. Fayard. ISBN 978-2-213-59317-3.
- Fournier, Marcel; Rosenberg, M. Michael; White, Deena (1997). Quebec society : critical issues. Prentice Hall Canada. ISBN 978-0-13-158551-5.
- Fournier, Marcel (2007). Émile Durkheim : 1858-1917 (Fayard ed.). Paris. ISBN 978-2-213-61537-0.
- Sales, Arnaud; Fournier, Marcel (2007). Knowledge, communication and creativity. London: Sage Publishing.
- Fournier, Marcel (2014). Profession, sociologue. Presses de l'Université de Montréal. ISBN 978-2-7606-2193-0.
