= François Rousseau (researcher) =

Medical doctor and researcher

François Rousseau is a medical doctor and researcher from Quebec Canada. His publications include studies about Quebec health history. His book L'oeuvre de chère en Nouvelle-France: Le régime des malades à l'Hôtel-Dieu de Québec was a finalist for the 1983 Governor General's Awards in "French Language - Non-fiction" category. In 1994, he published La croix et le scalpel: Histoire des Augustines et de l'Hôtel-Dieu de Québec (1639-1989).
