= 1976 Governor General's Awards =

Canadian literary award

Each winner of the 1976 Governor General's Awards for Literary Merit was selected by a panel of judges administered by the Canada Council for the Arts.

== Winners ==
=== English Language ===
- Fiction: Marian Engel, Bear.
- Poetry or Drama: Joe Rosenblatt, Top Soil.
- Non-Fiction: Carl Berger, The Writing of Canadian History.

=== French Language ===
- Fiction: André Major, Les rescapés.
- Poetry or Drama: Alphonse Piché, Poèmes 1946-1968.
- Non-Fiction: Fernand Ouellette, Le Bas Canada 1791-1840, changements structuraux et crise.
