= Jean-Jacques Pelletier =

Canadian writer and philosopher (born 1947)

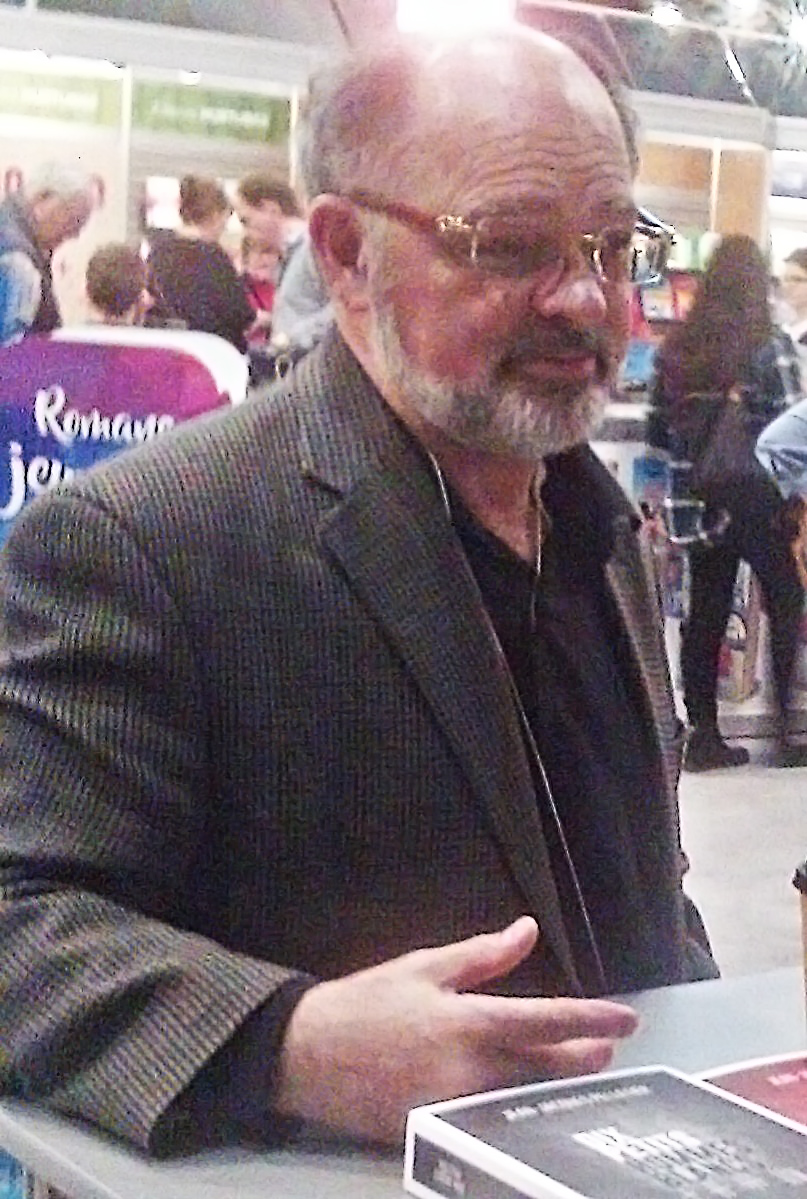
Jean-Jacques Pelletier

Jean-Jacques Pelletier (born 1947 in Montreal, Quebec) is a French Canadian philosophy professor and author. Pelletier was a long-time philosophy teacher with the Lévis-Lauzon post-secondary school, but is best known in several media as an author of French-language thrillers, some of which have an element of fantasy. Many of his works have received critical acclaim, as his short story "La Bouche barbelée" won a CBC/Radio-Canada contest in 1993.

Pelletier has had several other works published as well, and his works Blunt - Les treize derniers jours and La Chair disparue were published as serials in the popular Montreal magazine La Presse in 1997–1998.

La Chair disparue was chosen for inclusion in the French version of Canada Reads, broadcast on Radio-Canada in 2005, where it was defended by pianist Alain Lefèvre.

== Bibliography ==
=== Novels ===
- L'Homme trafiqué (1987)
- L'Homme à qui il poussait des bouches (1994, novella)
- La Femme trop tard (1994)
- Blunt - Les treize derniers jours (1996)
- L'Assassiné de l'intérieur (1997)
- Les Gestionnaires de l'Apocalypse series:
  - La Chair disparue (1998)
  - L'Argent du monde (1 & 2) (2001)
  - Le Bien des autres (1 & 2) (2003–2004)
  - La Faim de la Terre (1 & 2) (2009)
- Les visages de l'humanité (2012)
- Dix petits hommes blancs (2014)

=== Essays ===
- "Caisse de retraite et placements" (1994)
- "Écrire pour inquiéter et pour construire" (2002)
- "Les taupes frénétiques" (2012) Hurtubise Editions
- "La fabrique de l'extrême" (2012) Hurtubise Editions
- "La Prison de l'urgence" (2013) Hurtubise Editions
- "Questions d'écriture" (2014) Hurtubise Editions

=== Short stories ===
- "L'Homme qui avait avalé un gouffre" (1992)
- "La Bouche barbelée" (1993)
- "L'Enfant bosselé" (1994)
- L'Assassiné de l'intérieur (1997, collection)
- "La Mort aux dents" (2001)
