= 1963 Governor General's Awards =

Canadian literary award

Each winner of the 1963 Governor General's Awards for Literary Merit was selected by a panel of judges administered by the Canada Council for the Arts.

== Winners ==
=== English Language ===
- Fiction: Hugh Garner, Hugh Garner's Best Stories.
- Non fiction: J.M.S. Careless, Brown of the Globe.

=== French Language ===
- Poetry or Drama: Gatien Lapointe, Ode au Saint-Laurent.
- Non-Fiction: Gustave Lanctot, Histoire du Canada.
