= Gatien Lapointe =

Canadian poet (1931–1983)

Gatien Lapointe (December 18, 1931 - September 15, 1983) was a Canadian poet from Quebec. He is most noted for his collections Ode au Saint-Laurent, which won the Governor General's Award for French-language poetry or drama, the Prix du Maurier and the Prix du Québec in 1963, and Le premier mot, which won the Prix du Québec in 1967.

== Early life and career ==
Born in Sainte-Justine, he studied at the Petit Séminaire de Québec, the Université de Montréal, the Collège de France and the Sorbonne. He published his first poetry collection, Jour malaisé, in 1953 and followed up with Otages de la joie in 1955 and Le Temps premier in 1962.

He taught at the Royal Military College Saint-Jean from 1962 to 1969, and then became a professor at the Université du Québec à Trois-Rivières. In 1971 he cofounded the publishing house Écrits des Forges. After Le premier mot he did not publish any new work for many years, but late in life he published a number of new works, including Arbre-radar, Barbare inouï, Corps et Graphies, Corps de l'instant and Le Premier Paysage.

He died in 1983 in Trois-Rivières.
