= Fernand Dumont =

Canadian sociologist, philosopher, theologian and poet (1927–1997)

Fernand Dumont OQ MSRC
- Dumont in 1990
- Born: 24 June 1927; Montmorency, Quebec, Canada
- Died: 1 May 1997 (aged 69); Quebec, Canada

Academic background
- Education: Université Laval; University of Paris

Academic work
- Discipline: Sociology
- Institutions: Université Laval
- Influenced: Gérard Bouchard

Fernand Dumont OQ MSRC (24 June 1927 – 1 May 1997) was a Canadian sociologist, philosopher, theologian, and poet from Quebec. A longtime professor at Université Laval, he won the Governor General's Award for French-language non-fiction at the 1968 Governor General's Awards for Le lieu de l'homme.

== See also ==
- Quebec literature

Awards
Preceded by Robert-Lionel Séguin	Governor General's Award for French-language non-fiction 1968	Succeeded by Michel Brunet
Preceded by Rina Lasnier	Prix Athanase-David; 1975	Succeeded by Pierre Vadeboncœur
Preceded by Larkin Kerwin	Jacques Rousseau Award; 1984	Succeeded by Gérard Bouchard
Preceded by Gérard Bergeron	Prix Léon-Gérin; 1990	Succeeded by Bruce Trigger
Preceded by Denys Arcand	Molson Prize; 1992; With: Douglas Cardinal	Succeeded by Juliet McMaster
Preceded by Charles Taylor	Molson Prize; 1992; With: Douglas Cardinal	Succeeded by R. Murray Schafer
