= Laurent-Michel Vacher =

Laurent-Michel Vacher (26 May 1944 – 8 July 2005) was a French-born, French Canadian philosopher, writer, journalist (Le Devoir, Hobo-Québec, Chroniques, Spirale) and teacher (Ahuntsic College, Montreal).

He was a proponent of scientism, rationalism, positivism, pragmatism and materialism, a critic of mainstream schools of today's philosophy and the usual history-centered pedagogy in the field of philosophy.

He was one of the few contemporary philosophers who possessed sufficient scientific knowledge to fairly assess the unique role of modern science and scientific method as a knowledge-acquiring mechanism; in his opinion, all recent or less recent scientific knowledge should be considered by philosophers in any of their philosophical approaches as the necessary starting point to avoid the mythical speech and the metaphysical empty talk.

He often criticised the attitude of some French philosophers concerning what in Francophone literature is labelled somewhat pejoratively as Anglo-Saxon philosophy (perceived as too pragmatist, empiricist and materialist), considering it as a damaging "aristocratic" remnant of continental philosophy. He was a 1990 Governor General's Awards winner (non-fiction) for his L'Empire du moderne.

From the political point of view he was a left-leaning intellectual, considered to be an anti-elitist; concerning the Canadian and Quebec's political issues, he was an anti-nationalist and against the sovereignty of provinces in the (Canadian) federation.

== Writings ==
- La passion du réel - La philosophie devant les sciences (Liber, 2006)
- Histoire d'idées (Liber, 1994)
- La science par ceux qui la font (Liber, 1998)
- Le crépuscule d'une idole - Nietzsche et la pensée fasciste (Liber, 2003)
- L'empire du moderne - Actualité de la philosophie américaine (Herbes rouges, 1990)
- Débats philosophiques, Entretiens avec Mario Bunge (Liber, 1993)
- Pour un matérialisme vulgaire (Herbes rouges, 1984)
- Dialogues en ruine (Liber, 1996)
- Une triste histoire (Liber, 2001),
- Une petite fin du monde (Liber, 2005)
- Pratiques de la pensée - Philosophie et enseignement de la philosophie au cégep (Liber, 2002)
- Cinq intellectuels sur la place publique, Découvrons la philosophie (with François Hertel)
