= Robert Melançon =

Canadian writer and translator (born 1947)

Robert Melançon (born 12 May 1947) is a Canadian writer and translator. He has been a professor of literature at the Université de Montréal since 1972.

Melançon was born in Montreal, Quebec.

== Honors ==
- 1979 – Governor General's Award for French-language poetry or drama, Peinture aveugle
- 1990 – Governor General's Award for English to French translation, Second Rouleau (with Charlotte Melançon)
- 2003 – Prix Victor-Barbeau, Exercices de désoeuvrement
- 2005 – Prix Alain-Grandbois, Le Paradis des apparences

== Publications ==
- 1972 – The Poetic Image in France, Philippe Desportes Hopil Claude, 1570–1630
