= Nicolas Lévesque (writer) =

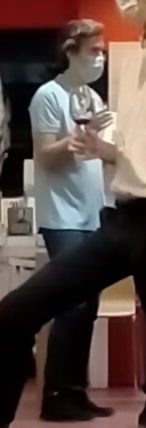
Image of Nicolas Lévesque

Nicolas Lévesque (born September 19, 1974) is a Canadian writer and psychologist from Montreal, Quebec. He is most noted as a two-time Governor General's Award nominee for French-language non-fiction, receiving nods at the 2014 Governor General's Awards for Ce que dit l'écorce (co-written with Catherine Mavrikakis), and at the 2017 Governor General's Awards for Je sais trop bien ne pas exister.

He is the son of philosopher Claude Lévesque.

== Works ==
- Le deuil impossible nécessaire. Essai sur la perte, la trace et la culture, 2005
- (...) Teen Spirit. Essai sur notre époque, 2009
- Les rêveries de la Plaza St-Hubert, 2011
- Le Québec vers l'âge adulte, 2012.
- Ce que dit l'écorce, 2014 with Catherine Mavrikakis
- Le peuple et l'opium, 2015
- Je sais trop bien ne pas exister, 2016
- Phora, sur ma pratique de psy, 2019
- Ptoma : Un psy en chute libre, 2021
- Un psy au micro, 2023
