= Fernand Ouellette =

Canadian writer (1930–2026)

Fernand Ouellette (24 September 1930 – 3 February 2026) was a Canadian Quebecois writer who wrote in French. He was a three-time winner of the Governor General's Awards, having won the Governor General's Award for French-language non-fiction at the 1970 Governor General's Awards for Les actes retrouvés, the Governor General's Award for French-language fiction at the 1985 Governor General's Awards for Lucie ou un midi en novembre, and the Governor General's Award for French-language poetry at the 1987 Governor General's Awards for Les Heures.

Ouellette was born in Montreal, Quebec on 24 September 1930. He died on 3 February 2026, at the age of 95.

== Works (selection) ==
Poetry

- These angels of blood, Montreal, L'Hexagone, 1955
- Sequences of the wing, Montreal, L'Hexagone, 1958
- The sun in death, Montreal, L'Hexagone, 1965; The sun in death (preceded wing Sequences and radiographs), Montreal, Typo 1995
- In the dark, Montreal, L'Hexagone, 1967
- Poetry (1953-1971), Montreal, The Hexagon 1972
- Wanderings, Montreal, Editions Bourguignon, 1975
- Here, there, light, Montreal, The Hexagon 1977
- In short, Montreal, Editions Parallel 1979
- In the night, the sea (1972-1980), Montreal, The Hexagon 1981
- Awakenings, Obsidian, Montreal, with nine lithographs by Léon Bellefleur, 1982
- Nella Notte, Il Mare altre poetry, translated from Italian by Antonella Emina Martinetto, Rome, Bulzoni Editore, 1986
- Clocks, Montreal / Seyssel, Hexagon / Champ Vallon, 1987; Typo 1988; Typo 2007
- Wells of light, trans. English Barry Callaghan and Ray Ellenwood, Toronto, Exile Editions, 1989
- Beyond the passage, Montreal, The Hexagon 1997
- Selection of poems (1955-1997), presenting Georges Leroux, Montreal, coll. "the lily", Fides, 2000
- The unforgettable, Chronicle I, Montreal, L'Hexagone, 2005
- The unforgettable, Chronicle II, Montreal, L'Hexagone, 2006
- The unforgettable, Chronicle III, Montreal, L'Hexagone, 2007
- The wide presence, Montreal, L'Hexagone, 2008
- The Steep, Volume I, Montreal, L'Hexagone, 2009
- The Steep, Volume II, Montreal, L'Hexagone, 2009
- The Absent, Éditions du passage, illustrated with 34 works on paper by Christian Gardair, Montreal, 2010
- Wake of the addition (choice of poems 1953-2008), preface by Georges Leroux, Montreal, Typo, 2010
- At the extreme of the time (2010-2012 poems), Montreal, L'Hexagone, 2013
- Hours, translated from English by Antonio D'Alfonso, Toronto, Buffalo, Lancaster, coll. "Essential translation", Guernica Editions, 2014.
- Progress towards the invisible, Montreal, L'Hexagone, 2015

Novels

- You intensely watched Genevieve, Montreal, Les Quinze, 1978; Introducing Joseph Bonenfant, Montreal, Typo 1990
- The bright death, Montreal, Les Quinze, 1980; Presentation by Pierre Ouellet, Typo 1992
- Lucie or one afternoon in November, Montreal, Boreal, 1985

Non-Fiction

- Edgard Varèse. A Musical Biography. London: Calder and Boyars, 1973
