= 1970 Governor General's Awards =

Canadian literary award

Each winner of the 1970 Governor General's Awards for Literary Merit was selected by a panel of judges administered by the Canada Council for the Arts. The winners received a $2500 prize.

== Winners ==
=== English Language ===
- Fiction: Dave Godfrey, The New Ancestors.
- Poetry or Drama: bpNichol, Beach Head, Still Water and The True Eventual Story of Billy the Kid
- Poetry and Prose: Michael Ondaatje, The Collected Works of Billy the Kid.

=== French Language ===
- Fiction: Monique Bosco, La femme de Loth.
- Poetry or Drama: Jacques Brault, Quand Nous Serons Heureux.
- Non-Fiction: Fernand Ouellette, Les Actes Retrouvés.
