= 1968 Governor General's Awards =

Canadian literary award

Each winner of the 1968 Governor General's Awards for Literary Merit was selected by a panel of judges administered by the Canada Council for the Arts. The year was marked by controversy as both Leonard Cohen and Hubert Aquin refused to accept their awards. Winners were given a cash prize of $2500

== Winners ==
=== English Language ===
- Fiction: Alice Munro, Dance of the Happy Shades.
- Fiction: Mordecai Richler, Cocksure.
- Poetry or Drama: Leonard Cohen, Selected Poems 1956-68.
- Non-Fiction: Mordecai Richler, Hunting Tigers Under Glass.

=== French Language ===
- Fiction: Hubert Aquin, Trou de mémoire.
- Fiction: Marie-Claire Blais, Manuscrits de Pauline Archange.
- Non-Fiction: Fernand Dumont, Le Liue de l'Homme.
