= Alphonse Piché =

Canadian poet (1917–1998)

- Born: 14 February 1917; Chicoutimi
- Died: 1 January 1998 (aged 80)
- Writing career
- Language: French
- Genre: poetry
- Notable awards: 1976 Governor General's Awards

Alphonse Piché (14 February 1917 – 2 December 1998) was a Canadian poet. He won a 1976 Governor General's Awards.

== Life ==
He studied at the Saint-Joseph seminary. He lived most of his life in Trois-Rivières. His poetry addresses the themes of the people struggling with the agonies and joys of everyday life. He lived long near the St. Lawrence River on which he sailed. His latest collection deliver the words of a man in love with life, in the face of old age and death.

His papers are held at the Bibliothèque et Archives nationales du Québec.

A poetry prize is named for him.

== Awards ==
- 1947 - Prix David, Ballades de la petite extrace
- 1966 - Grand prix littéraire de la Société Saint-Jean-Baptiste de la Mauricie
- 1976 - Prix littéraire du Gouverneur général du Canada, Poèmes 1946-1950
- 1989 - Ludger-Duvernay Prize
- 1992 - Membre de l'Ordre du Canada

== Works ==
- Ballades de la petite extrace, Editions Fernand Pilon, 1946
- Remous, F. Pilon, 1947
- Voie d'eau, F. Pilon, 1950
- Poèmes 1946-1966, Editions du Bien Public, 1966
- Poèmes 1946-1968, Éditions de l'Hexagone, 1976
- Dernier Profil 1982
- Fenêtre/Haïku L. Lavoie Maheux, 1986
- Le choix d'Alphonse Piché dans l'œuvre d'Alphonse Piché, Les Presses Laurentiennes, 1987, ISBN 9782890150546
- Sursis, Écrit forges, 1987, ISBN 9782890461215
- Fables, L'Hexagone, 1989, ISBN 9782890063532
- Néant fraternel, Écrits des Forges, 1991, ISBN 9782890462298
- Retour, Ecrits des Forges, 1997, ISBN 9782890464506
