= 1959 Governor General's Awards =

Canadian literary award

The 1959 Governor General's Awards for Literary Merit were the 24th rendition of the Governor General's Awards, Canada's annual national awards program, which then comprised literary awards alone. The awards recognized Canadian writers for new works published in Canada during 1959.

Canada Council for the Arts took over administration of the program sometime during 1959 or 1960 – after the 1958 Governor General's Awards that recognized 1958 publications. Canada Council arranged for the first cash prizes to award-winning writers, "at least 6 prizes of $1000 each for fiction, nonfiction, and drama or poetry in English and French". Thus, the program was expanded to cover French- as well as English-language works. Otherwise, the number of award categories was reduced from five to three – the juvenile category eliminated after 10 years, the double recognition of non-fiction after 17 years.

In the event, only four awards were conferred for 1959 publications, two for English-language and two for French.

== Winners ==
=== English Language ===
- Fiction: Hugh MacLennan, The Watch That Ends the Night.
- Poetry or Drama: Irving Layton, A Red Carpet for the Sun.

=== French Language ===
- Fiction: André Giroux, Malgré tout, la joie.
- Non-Fiction: Félix-Antoine Savard, Le barachois.
