= Jacques Michon =

Canadian literary historian and academic (1945–2026)

- Born: 12 May 1945; Montreal, Quebec, Canada
- Died: 1 April 2026 (aged 80); Sherbrooke, Quebec, Canada
- Occupations: Literary historian; academic

Jacques Michon (12 May 1945 – 1 April 2026) was a Canadian literary historian and academic.

Michon was a professor at the Université de Sherbrooke, where he co-founded the Groupe de recherches et d'études sur le livre au Québec alongside Richard Giguère. He was the group's director from 1982 to 2006. That year, he was awarded the Grand prix littéraire de la ville de Sherbrooke. He retired in 2014.

Michon died in Sherbrooke on 1 April 2026, at the age of 80.

== Publications ==
- Structure, idéologie et réception du roman québécois de 1940 à 1960 (1979)
- Émile Nelligan : les racines du rêve (1983)
- L'Édition du livre populaire : études sur les Éditions Édouard Garand, de l'Étoile, Marquis et Granger (1988)
- Poésies complètes 1896-1941 (1991)
- Éditeurs transatlantiques : études sur les Éditions de l'Arbre, Lucien Parizeau, Fernand Pilon, Serge Brousseau, Mangin, B.D. Simpson (1991)
- L'édition littéraire en quête d'autonomie : Albert Lévesque et son temps (1994)
- Édition et pouvoirs (1995)
- Fides : la grande aventure éditoriale du père Paul-Aimé Martin (1998)
- Histoire de l'édition littéraire au Québec au xxe siècle. La naissance de l'éditeur, 1900-1939 (1999)
- Œuvres poétiques complètes (2000)
- Les mutations du livre et de l'édition dans le monde du XVIIIe siècle à l'an 2000 (2000)
- Histoire de l'édition littéraire au Québec au xxe siècle. Le temps des éditeurs, 1940-1959 (2004)
- Poèmes et textes d'asile 1900-1941 (2006)
- Les éditeurs québécois et l'effort de guerre, 1940-1948 (2009)
- Histoire de l'édition littéraire au Québec au xxe siècle. La bataille du livre, 1960-2000 (2010)
