= Félix-Antoine Savard =

Canadian priest, academic, poet, novelist and folklorist

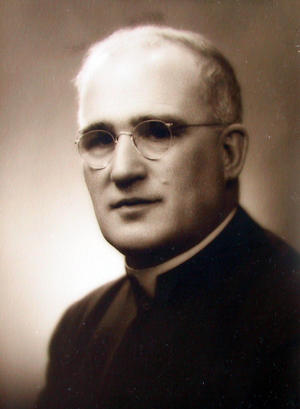
- Born: August 31, 1896; Quebec City, Quebec
- Died: August 24, 1982 (aged 85); Quebec City, Quebec

Félix-Antoine Savard, OC MSRC (August 31, 1896 – August 24, 1982) was a Canadian priest, academic, poet, novelist and folklorist.

Born in Quebec City, he grew up in Chicoutimi, Quebec. He received a Bachelor of Arts in 1918 and was ordained a priest in 1922. He occupied several ecclesiastical positions in Charlevoix and Saguenay before founding the parish of Clermont in Charlevoix.

While in Clermont, Savard explored the Charlevoix countryside and became well acquainted with the local log drivers. The mountains of Charlevoix were the setting for his 1937 novel Menaud, maître draveur which made him famous and earned him a medal from the Académie française. It remains to this day one of the best-known works of Quebec literature. Like Maria Chapdeleine, the title character Menaud has become a key figure in Quebec's national identity.

He joined the Faculty of Arts at Université Laval in 1945 and from 1950 to 1957 was its dean.

== Works ==
- Menaud maître-draveur, novel, Québec, Librairie Garneau, 1937 (translation: Boss of the river, translated by Alan Sullivan, Toronto, Ryerson Press, 1947).
- L'abatis, poems and souvenirs, Montréal, Éditions Fides, 1943.
- La Minuit, novel, Montréal, Éditions Fides, 1948.
- Martin et le pauvre, legend, Montréal, Éditions Fides, 1959.
- Le Barachois, poems and souvenirs, Montréal, Éditions Fides, 1959.
- La Folle, play, Montréal, Éditions Fides, 1960.
- La Dalle-des-morts, play, Montréal, Éditions Fides, 1965.
- La Symphonie du Misereror, Ottawa, Éditions de l'Université d'Ottawa, 1968.
- Le Bouscueuil, poems and souvenirs, Montréal, Éditions Fides, 1972.
- La roche Ursule, poems, Québec, 1972. Ce poème est extrait du Bouscueil.
- Journal et souvenirs, poems and souvenirs, Montréal, Éditions Fides, 1973.
- Aux marges du silence, poems, Québec, Librairie Garneau, 1975.

== Honours ==
- In 1945, he was awarded the Lorne Pierce Medal.
- 1959 Governor General's Awards for Malgré tout, la joie.
- In 1968, he was made an Officer of the Order of Canada.
- In 1969, he was awarded the Prix Athanase-David.
- In 2005, his book Menaud, maître-draveur (Boss of the River) (1937) was selected as one of Canada's 100 Most Important Books by the Literary Review of Canada.
