= Prix David =

Literary and scientific prize in Quebec

The Prix David (David Prize), also known as Les concours littéraires du Québec, was created in 1923 by the Secretary of the Province of Quebec, Athanase David, in memory of his father, Laurent-Olivier David. These prizes were awarded to writers or researchers who submitted the best literary or scientific works to the province's literary and scientific competitions.

In 1937, the prize was renamed the "Prix de la province de Québec", but in the early 1960s "Prix David" was reintroduced for literature laureates.

In 1968, the Prix Athanase-David was created to recognize a writer's body of work. In 1970, Les concours littéraires du Québec ended, to be replaced by the Prix du Québec in 1977.

The Prix David archives are held at the Bibliothèque et Archives nationales du Québec in Montreal.

== Selected laureates ==
- 1923
  - Paul Morin: Poèmes de cendre et d'or
  - Ivanhoé Caron: La colonisation de la province de Québec
  - Frère Marie-Victorin: Les filicinées du Québec
  - Victor Germain: La Société des nations
  - J.-G. Paradis: Feuilles de journal : souvenirs d'un médecin de campagne
  - Robert de Roquebrune: Les habits rouges
  - Frederick George Scott: The Great War as I Saw It
  - Robert Stanley Weir: Poems, Early and Late
- 1924
  - Camille Roy
  - Élie-Joseph-Arthur Auclair
  - Harry Bernard
  - Jean Charbonneau
  - Marie-Claire Daveluy
  - Pierre Dupuy
  - Louis Francœur
  - Philippe Panneton
- 1925
  - Marius Barbeau
- 1926
  - Antoine Bernard
  - Harry Bernard
  - Robert Choquette
  - Louis-Philippe Geoffrion
  - Paul de Martigny
  - Arthur Saint-Pierre
- 1927
  - Ivanhoé Caron
  - Henry Laureys
- 1929
  - Marius Barbeau
  - Jean-Charles Harvey
  - Alice Lemieux-Lévesque
  - Simone Routier
- 1930
  - Marcel Dugas
  - Marcolin-Antonio Lamarche
- 1932
  - Harry Bernard
  - Robert Choquette
  - Alfred Desrochers
- 1933
  - Albert Pelletier
  - Adolphe Nantel
- 1935
  - Jacques Francœur
  - Claude-Henri Grignon
- 1936
  - Gérard Morisset
- 1937
  - Eugène Lapierre
- 1938
  - Léo-Paul Desrosiers
  - Félix-Antoine Savard
  - Damase Potvin
- 1939
  - Clovis Duval
  - Clément Marchand, Les Soirs Rouges
  - Gérard Martin, Le Temple
- 1941
  - Victor Barbeau
  - Alain Grandbois
  - Rex Desmarchais
- 1942
  - Robert Charbonneau
  - Clément Marchand
  - Philippe Panneton
- 1943
  - Anne Hébert
  - Rodolphe Dubé
  - Rina Lasnier
- 1945
  - Marius Barbeau
  - Léopold Houlé
  - Marcel Trudel
- 1946
  - Germaine Guèvremont
  - Félix Leclerc
  - Roger Lemelin
  - Pierre Demers
- 1947
  - Gérard Bessette
  - Alain Grandbois
  - Alphonse Piché
- 1949
  - Élie-Joseph-Arthur Auclair
  - Jacques Hébert
  - Gérard Morisset
- 1950
  - Robert Élie
  - André Giroux
  - Clément Lockquell
- 1951
  - Sylvain Garneau
  - Anne Hébert
  - Paul Toupin
- 1952
  - Abraham Moses Klein
- 1953
  - Paul Beaulieu
  - Sœur Marie-Henri De la Croix
  - Jacques Hébert
- 1954
  - Adrienne Choquette
  - Eugène Cloutier
  - Jean Filiatrault
  - Yves Thériault
- 1955
  - Robert Choquette
  - Fernand Dumont
  - Jean-Guy Pilon
- 1957
  - Roméo Arbour
  - Léopold Lamontagne
  - Romain Légaré
- 1958
  - Léo-Paul Desrosiers
  - Anne Hébert
  - Yves Thériault
- 1959
  - Ronald Després
  - Jacques Godbout
  - Pierre Trottier
- 1961
  - Pierre Angers
  - Jean Béraud
- 1962
  - Jean-Paul Filion
  - Gilles Hénault
  - Jean Le Moyne
- 1963
  - Gatien Lapointe
  - Suzanne Paradis
- 1964
  - Réal Benoît
  - Paul Chamberland
  - Monique Chouinard Corriveau
  - Eva Kushner
- 1965
  - Gérard Bessette
  - Jacques Brault
  - Roch Carrier
  - Antonine Maillet
  - R. Miville Dechêne
  - Paul Toupin
- 1966
  - Monique Chouinard Corriveau
  - Pierre de Grandpré
  - Nicole Deschamps
  - Louis Durand
  - Roland Giguère
  - Claire Martin
- 1967
  - Réjean Ducharme
  - Jean Éthier-Blais
  - Gatien Lapointe
- 1968
  - Jehane Benoît
  - Paule Daveluy
  - Suzanne Chouinard Martel
  - Jean-Paul Pinsonneault
  - Yves Préfontaine
  - Robert Vigneault
- 1969
  - Yvette Naubert
  - Jean-Cléo Godin
- 1970
  - Hubert Aquin
  - Roland Bourneuf
  - Cécile Gagnon
  - Guy Gervais
