= Académie des lettres du Québec =

The Académie des lettres du Québec is a national academy for Quebec writers.

It was founded as the Académie canadienne-française in 1944 by Victor Barbeau and a group of writers. In 1992 it changed its name to the Académie des lettres du Québec.

It brings together writers and intellectuals of all disciplines. It can have up to 42 members.

== Prizes awarded by the Academy ==
- Prix Victor-Barbeau
- Prix Alain-Grandbois
- Prix Ringuet
- Médaille de l'Académie des lettres du Québec
- Prix Molson du roman (1983-1994)

== Founding members ==
- Marius Barbeau
- Victor Barbeau
- Roger Brien
- Robert Charbonneau
- Robert Choquette
- Marie-Claire Daveluy
- Léo-Paul Desrosiers
- Guy Frégault
- Alain Grandbois
- Lionel Groulx
- François Hertel
- Louis Lachance
- Gustave Lamarche
- Rina Lasnier
- Philippe Panneton
- Robert Rumilly

== Deceased members ==
- André Barbeau
- Gérard Bessette
- Roméo Boucher
- Michel Brunet
- René de Chantal
- Roger Duhamel
- Fernand Dumont
- Jean Éthier-Blais
- Jean-Charles Falardeau
- Jean-Louis Gagnon
- Germaine Guèvremont
- André Laurendeau
- Andrée Maillet
- Jean Ménard
- Émile Ollivier
- Léopold Richer
- Simone Routier
- Paul Toupin
- André Vanasse

== Current members ==
- Jacques Allard
- Jean-Louis Baudoin
- Yves Beauchemin
- Gérald A. Beaudoin
- Lise Bissonnette
- Marie-Claire Blais
- Gérard Bouchard
- André Brochu
- Nicole Brossard
- Louis Caron
- Paul Chamberland
- Jean-Claude Corbeil
- Pierre de Grandpré
- Denise Desautels
- Hélène Dorion
- Marcel Dubé
- Louise Dupré
- Jean-Pierre Duquette
- Jacques Folch-Ribas
- Madeleine Gagnon
- Lise Gauvin
- Suzanne Jacob
- Naïm Kattan
- Monique LaRue
- Georges Leroux
- Claude Lévesque
- Louise Maheux-Forcier
- Antonine Maillet
- Clément Marchand
- Réginald Martel
- Madeleine Monette
- Pierre Nepveu
- Madeleine Ouellette-Michalska
- Jean-Guy Pilon
- Hubert Reeves
- André Ricard
- Edmond Robillard
- Jean Royer
- Fernande Saint-Martin
- Marcel Trudel
- Jean-Pierre Wallot

== Honorary members ==
- Vassilis Alexakis (Greece/France)
- Alain Bosquet (France)
- Andrée Chedid (Egypt/France)
- Maryse Condé (Guadeloupe/United States)
- Vénus Khoury-Ghata (Lebanon/France)
- Milan Kundera (Czech Republic/France)
- Eduardo Manet (Cuba/France)
- Pierre Mertens (French-speaking community of Belgium)

== See also ==
- List of writers from Quebec
