= Medal of the Académie des lettres du Québec =

Medal of the Académie des lettres du Québec is an award granted by the Académie des lettres du Québec to a writer for the body of his or her work or to a personality in cultural life.

== List of award recipients ==
- 1946 - Gabrielle Roy
- 1947 - Germaine Guèvremont
- 1958 - Raymond Barbeau
- 1959 - Jean Bruchési
- 1961 - Paul Morin
- 1962 - Pierre Daviault
- 1963 - Geneviève Massignon
- 1967 - Robert de Roquebrune
- 1974 - Gilles Marcotte
- 1980 - Séraphin Marion
- 1984 - Anne Hébert
- 1985 - Luc Lacourcière
- 1986 - Marcel Dubé
- 1987 - Félix Leclerc
- 1988 - Gratien Gélinas
- 1989 - Paul Beaulieu
- 1990 - Gaston Miron
- 1991 - Réginald Martel
- 1992 - Gilles Vigneault
- 1993 - Maurice Lemire
- 1994 - Maryvonne Kendergi
- 1995 - Roland Giguère
- 1996 - Jean-Marc Léger
- 1997 - Marie-Éva de Villers
- 1998 - Lise Bissonnette
- 1999 - Claire Martin
- 2000 - Gaston Bellemare
- 2003 - Jacques Lacoursière
- 2004 - Yvan Lamonde
- 2005 - André Vanasse
- 2006 - Françoise Sullivan
- 2007 - Jacques Godbout
- 2008 - Pierre Vadeboncœur
- 2009 - Jean-Jacques Nattiez
- 2010 - Fernand Ouellet
- 2011 - François Ricard
- 2012 - Robert Lepage
- 2013 - François-Marc Gagnon
- 2014 - Gaëtan Dostie
- 2015 - Patricia Smart
- 2016 - Jacques Brault
