= Marie-Josephte Corriveau =

Woman from New France who murdered her second husband (1733–1763)

Coordinates: 46°49′15.5″N 71°10′21.8″W

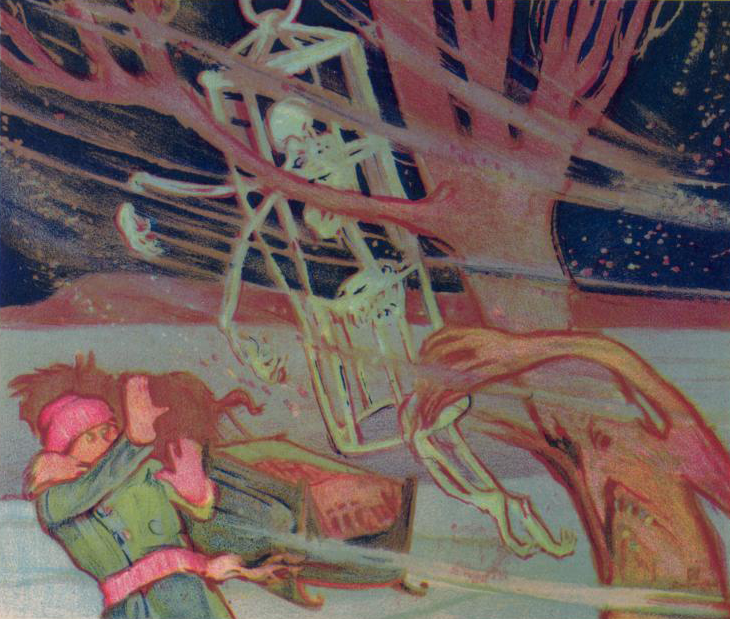
- La Corriveau's skeleton terrorising a traveller one stormy night. Illustration by Charles Walter Simpson for the Légendes du Saint-Laurent, 1926.
- Born: January or February 1733 (Note: The record of the act of baptism, of May 14, 1733, indicates that she was about three months old.); Saint-Vallier, New France
- Died: April 18, 1763 (aged 30); Quebec City
- Cause of death: Execution by hanging
- Resting place: Saint-Joseph-de-la-Pointe-De Lévy, Lévis
- Other name: La Corriveau
- Known for: Murder

Marie-Josephte Corriveau (1733 – April 18, 1763), better known as "la Corriveau", was a New French woman who was sentenced to death in 1763 by a British court martial for the murder of her second husband. She was hanged, and her body was placed in a gibbet on public display in Lévis. Becoming a well-known figure in Québécois folklore, she is the subject of many books and plays.

== Original spelling ==
Although she is traditionally referred to as "Marie-Josephte Corriveau", archives of the parish of Saint-Vallier show that she signed her name as "Marie-Joseph Corrivaux" for both her weddings and for two baptisms where she was godmother. Her father also signed his name as "Corrivaux".

== Early life ==
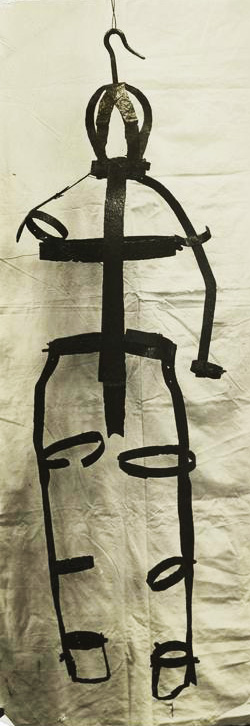
The gibbet in which Corriveau was exhibited after her execution, the "cage" of Corriveau

Marie-Josephte Corriveau was born in 1733, most probably in January or February, and baptised on May 14, 1733, in the rural parish of Saint-Vallier in New France. She was the only surviving offspring of Joseph Corriveau, a farmer, and Marie-Françoise Bolduc. Her ten brothers and sisters all died in childhood.

== Marriages and deaths of spouses ==
Corriveau married at the age of 16, on November 17, 1749, to Charles Bouchard, aged 23, also a farmer. Three children were born in this marriage: two daughters, Marie-Françoise (1752) and Marie-Angélique (1754), followed by a son, Charles (1757). Rumors (that only started after the death of her second husband) say that she murdered him, as there is no concrete record of his death – he was said to have died of "putrid fevers". Charles Bouchard was buried on April 27, 1760, and she remarried fifteen months later, on July 20, 1761, to another farmer from Saint-Vallier, Louis Étienne Dodier. On the morning of January 27, 1763, he was found dead in his barn, with multiple head wounds. Despite an official recording of the cause of death being from kicks of horses' hooves, and a speedy burial, rumours and gossip of murder spread rapidly through the neighbourhood. Dodier was on bad terms with his father-in-law and with his wife.

== Arrest and trial ==
At the time, New France had been conquered by the British in 1760 as part of the Seven Years' War and was under the administration of the British Army. On hearing the rumours, the local British military authorities (charged with keeping order) set up an inquiry into Dodier's death. The inquiry opened in Quebec City on March 29, 1763, at the Ursulines of Quebec, charging Joseph Corriveau and his daughter Marie-Josephte, before a military tribunal made up of 12 English officers and presided over by Lieutenant Colonel Roger Morris. Many persons in the community had testified, including Joseph's niece and Marie-Josephte's cousin, a young woman approximately the same age as Marie-Josephte named Isabelle Sylvain. The case ended, on April 9, with Joseph Corriveau being sentenced to death, for culpable homicide of his son-in-law. Marie-Josephte was found to be an accomplice to murder, and sentenced to 60 lashes and branded with the letter M on her hand. One of Joseph Corriveau's nieces, Isabelle Sylvain (who he employed as a servant), had testified but changed her story several times during the hearing; she was found guilty of perjury and given 30 lashes and branded with the letter P.

Condemned to hang, Joseph Corriveau then told his confessor, that he was no more than an accomplice to his daughter, after she had killed Dodier. At a second trial, on April 15, Marie-Josephte testified to having killed her husband with two blows of a hatchet during his sleep, because of his ill-treatment of her. The tribunal found her guilty and sentenced her to hang, her body after to be "hanged in chains" (that is, put up for public display on a gibbet).

== Execution ==
The place of execution was Quebec, on the Buttes-à-Nepveu, near the Plains of Abraham, probably on April 18. Her body was then taken, as directed by the sentence, to be put in chains at Pointe-Lévy, at the crossroads of Lauzon and Bienville ( Rue Saint-Joseph and Rue de l'Entente). (Note: These were all near an ancient religious site between the Saint-Joseph and Vaudreuil roads. There was a religious monument called the Monument de la Tempérance which remained in the middle of the nineteenth century, until 1885.) The body, in its iron gibbet, was exposed to the public view until May 25 at the earliest. Following the requests of those living nearby, an order from the military commander of the district of Quebec, James Murray, addressed to the captain of the militia of Pointe-Lévy, permitted its being taken down and buried.

In 1851, the "cage" was dug up from the cemetery of the church of Saint-Joseph-de-la-Pointe-Lévy when a pit was dug. (Note: Some renown attached to the bones recovered in this dig. The writer Louis Fréchette wrote about this discovery at the age of ten.) Soon after, the cage was stolen from the church cellar, and acquired by the American impresario P. T. Barnum and put on display as a "macabre object". After that, it was put on display at The Boston Museum. The museum slip indicated its provenance with two words: "From Quebec".

Through the efforts of the Société d'histoire de Lévis, the cage was acquired from the Boston Museum and is now part of a permanent display at Musée de la civilisation in Quebec City.

== In legend ==
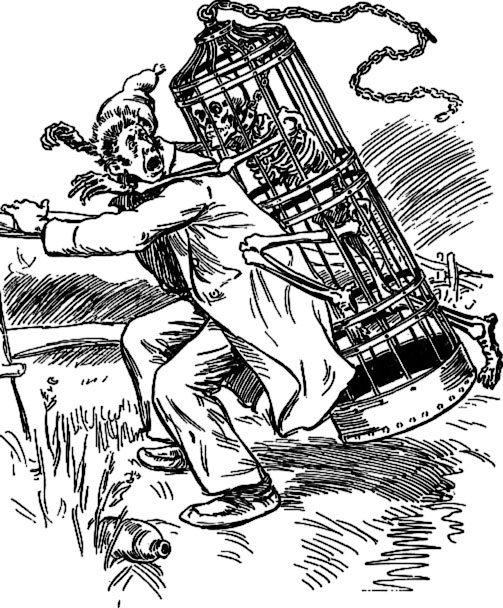
La Corriveau, in her cage, attacking Father José (José's Nightmare), illustration by Henri Julien for an edition of Anciens Canadiens by Philippe Aubert de Gaspé)

The post-mortem exhibition of Corriveau's remains at a busy crossroads (a practice also in use under the French regime, and reserved in England for those found guilty of the most serious crimes); (Note: See Gibbet.) the repercussions in the trial; the rumour that her father would be convicted of murdering Dodier at his daughter's instigation; and the gossip which grew up around the circumstances of the death of her first husband all stirred up the popular imagination and became legends still told today in the oral tradition — increasing the number of murdered husbands to as many as seven and likening la Corriveau to a witch.

The 1851 discovery of the iron cage buried in the cemetery of Saint-Joseph Parish (now the Lauzon district) served to reawaken the legends and the fantastic stories, which were amplified and used by 19th-century writers. The first, in 1863, Philippe Aubert de Gaspé in Les Anciens Canadiens, has a supernatural Corriveau hanging in the Pointe-Levy cage that terrorizes one night a passer-by conducting a Witches' Sabbath and a will-o'-the-wisp at the Île d'Orléans. James MacPherson Le Moine (Maple Leaves, 1863) and William Kirby, following in his footsteps (The Golden Dog, 1877), made her a professional poisoner, a direct descendant of La Voisin, famous for her purported role in the Affair of the Poisons. Writers and historians such as Louis Fréchette and Pierre-Georges Roy have tried to give Corriveau's history, but without completely separating the facts from the anachronistic fantasies added in legend and novels.

The figure of Corriveau still inspires novels, songs and plays and is the subject of arguments concerning guilt. Oral tradition also perpetuated and has not stopped and remains alive, as is evidenced by the numerous stories collected in the lands of many regions of Quebec. (Note: Notably the 52 stories collected between 1952 and 1973 under the direction of Luc Lacourcière (Lacourcière 1973, pp. 252–253 "Nos Racines / Our Roots". Archived from the original on 2011-06-14. and the 122 put together between 1975 and 1990 by the students of Nicole Guilbault (Guilbault 1995, p. 14).)

== In popular culture ==
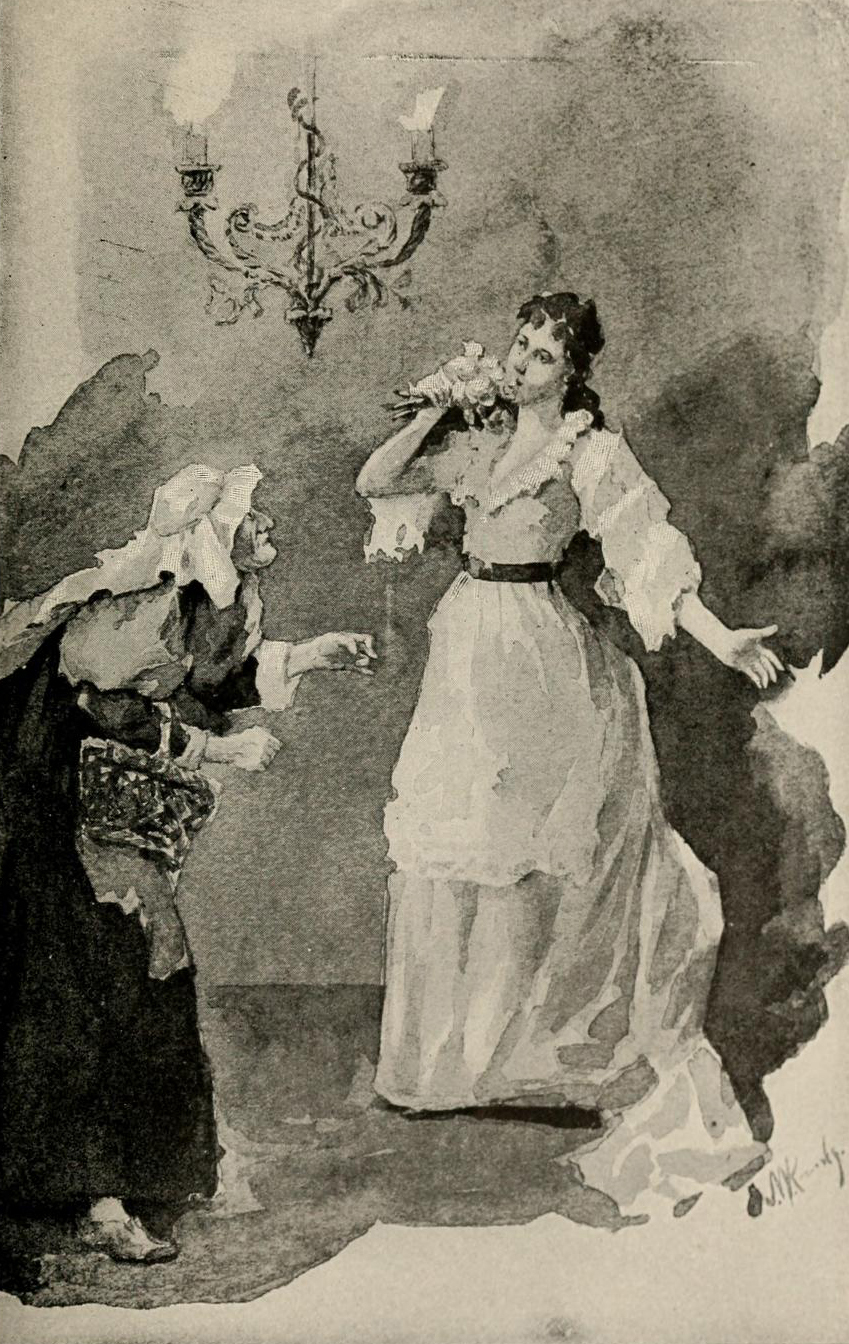
Caroline de Saint-Castin (right) pressing to her lips the poisoned bouquet offered by la Corriveau (left). Late 19th-century illustration by J. W. Kennedy for an American edition of The Golden Dog by William Kirby.

- 1863: Les Anciens Canadiens (The Canadians of Old), novel by Philippe Aubert de Gaspé
- 1863: Marie-Josephte Corriveau, A Canadian Lafarge, in Maple Leaves by James MacPherson Le Moine
- 1877: The Golden Dog, A Legend of Québec, novel by William Kirby, translated into French by Léon-Pamphile Le May, Le Chien d'Or, légende canadienne (1884)
- 1885: La Cage de la Corriveau, novel by Louis Fréchette, first published in a special edition of the newspaper La Patrie, 24 February 1885; reprinted and rewritten many times, notably under the title Une Relique in the Almanach du peuple de la librairie Beauchemin, Montreal, 1913.
- 1966: La Corriveau, dramatic ballet choreographed by Brydon Paige, with original theme and songs by Gilles Vigneault and music by Alexander Brott. Commissioned by the Commission du Centenaire de la Confédération, the ballet was premièred by Les Grands Ballets Canadiens, with the collaboration of the Montreal Symphony Orchestra at the Salle Wilfrid-Pelletier of the Place des Arts at Montréal, 21 and 22 December 1966.
- 1972: La Corriveau, song written by Gilles Vigneault in 1966 for the ballet of the same name, is recorded by Pauline Julien on her album Au milieu de ma vie, peut-être la veille de...
- 1973: Ma Corriveau, play by Victor-Lévy Beaulieu written for the public examinations of the students of the National Theatre School of Canada, premièred at the Monument-National, its Montreal base, from 3 to 6 October 1973 with a production by Michelle Rossignol, first premièred professionally at the Théâtre d'Aujourd'hui in Montreal from 19 September to 30 October 1976 in a production by André Pagé.
- 1978: Le Coffret de la Corriveau, fantasy story by André Carpentier, translated into English in 1982.
- 1981: La Corriveau, historical novel by Andrée LeBel
- 1990: La Cage, play by Anne Hébert, translated into English in 2009.
- 1993: La Corriveau, short story by the English Canadian Douglas Glover, translated into French the same year, and into Serbian in 1995.
- 1993: La Corriveau, play by Guy Cloutier, produced by Denise Verville and staged at the Théâtre Périscope, Quebec, from 12 to 30 January 1993. It was reprised, adapted for television with the title La Corrivaux by the director Jean Salvy, with Anne Dorval in the title role, and broadcast on the Télévision Radio-Canada network in 1995.
- 1999: La Maudite, teen novel by Daniel Mativat
- 2001: La Corrida de la Corriveau, song by Mes Aïeux (on the album Entre les branches)
- 2003: La Fiancée du vent: l'histoire de la Corriveau, née en Nouvelle-France et pendue sous le Régime anglais, novel by Monique Pariseau
- 2003: Julie et le serment de la Corriveau, teen novel by Martine Latulippe
- 2003: Her story and the alleged paranormal aspects of it were featured in Episode 1 of Season 2 of the Canadian paranormal documentary series Creepy Canada, which carried out and showed a reenactment of her story and its allegedly paranormal aspects.
- 2004: Battle of the Brave (Nouvelle-France), film produced by Jean Beaudin (loose adaptation on the theme of la Corriveau)
- 2006: La Corriveau, animated film by Kyle Craig
- 2015: Corriveau is featured on a postage stamp from Canada Post
- 2022: Les Filles du QUOI?, play by Abby Paige
- 2025: La Corriveau, song by La Déferlance (on the album Âmes des bois)

== Sources ==
- Aubert de Gaspé, Philippe (1863). Les Anciens Canadiens (in French). Québec: Desbarats et Derbishire. pp. totales =411. ISBN 0-665-28743-7. OCLC 77173288.
- Beaulieu, Victor-Lévy (1976), Ma Corriveau, suivi de La sorcellerie en finale sexuée (in French), Montreal: VLB, p. 117
- Bonneau, Louis-Philippe (1988). Josephte Corriveau-Dodier, la Corriveau, 1733-1763: une énigme non résolue. 15 (in French). Saint-François-de-la-Rivière-du-Sud (Quebec): Société de conservation du patrimoine de Saint-François-de-la-Rivière-du-Sud. pp. totales =231. OCLC 22506977.
- Dickinson, John (2001–2013). "La Corriveau". The Canadian Encyclopedia [en ligne]. Fondation Historica.. Brief article published in the online version of The Canadian Encyclopedia
- Fréchette, Louis-Honoré (24 February 1885). "La cage de la Corriveau" (PDF). La Patrie (in French) (Special edition). Longueuil: Société historique du Marigot: 10–20. ISBN 2-920313-01-0. Archived from the original (PDF) on 13 June 2011.
- Fréchette, Louis-Honoré (1913). "Une relique - La Corriveau". Almanach du Peuple Beauchemin (in French). Montréal: Beauchemin: 302–307. Archived from the original on 2015-06-10.
- Guilbault, Nicole (1995). Il était cent fois La Corriveau - Terre américaine (in French). Quebec: Nuit blanche. pp. totales =192. ISBN 9782921053426. OCLC 35874386. Anthology containing fifteen oral versions of the legend of la Corriveau, different literary texts inspired by the theme, and four studies.
- Douglas Hay (1996). "Civilians Tried in Military Courts: Quebec, 1759-64". In Frank Murray Greenwood; Barry Wright (eds.). Canadian State Trials, Vol. I: Law, Politics, and Security Measures, 1608-1837. Toronto: University of Toronto Press / The Osgoode Society for Canadian Legal History. pp. 114–128, 621–623. ISBN 9780802078933. OCLC 225313361. Archived from the original on 2010-12-03.
- Kirby, William (1877). The Chien d'Or / The Golden Dog - A Legend of Quebec. New York and Montreal: Lovell, Adam, Wesson & Company. ISBN 0-665-07186-8.
- Kirby, William; Le May, Pamphile (tr.) (1884). Le Chien d'or - Légende canadienne. Feuilleton de L'Étendard (in French). Montreal. ISBN 0-665-07987-7.
- Lacourcière, Luc (1968). "Le triple destin de Marie-Josephte Corriveau". Les Cahiers des Dix (in French) (33). Société des Dix: 213–242. doi:10.7202/1079669ar. ISSN 0575-089X. S2CID 243472944. Archived from the original on 2008-09-21. Reprinted in Guilbault 1995, pp. 147–172
- Lacourcière, Luc (1969). "Le destin posthume de la Corriveau". Les Cahiers des Dix (in French) (34). Société des Dix: 239–271. doi:10.7202/1079658ar. ISSN 0575-089X. S2CID 243471924. Archived from the original on 2007-09-29.
- Lacourcière, Luc (1973). "Présence de la Corriveau". Les Cahiers des Dix (in French) (38). Société des Dix: 229–264. doi:10.7202/1025313ar. ISSN 0575-089X. Archived from the original on 2008-09-21.
- Lacourcière, Luc (1974). "Corriveau, Marie-Josephte, La Corriveau". In Halpenny, Francess G. (ed.). Dictionary of Canadian Biography. Vol. III (1741–1770) (online ed.). University of Toronto Press. Encyclopaedia article
- MacPherson Le Moine, James (1863). "Marie-Josephte Corriveau, A Canadian Lafarge". Maple Leaves: A Budget of Legendary, Historical, Critical, and Sporting Intelligence. 1–7. Québec: Printed, for the author, by Hunter, Rose & Co: 68–74.
- Greenwood, Frank Murray; Boissery, Beverley (2000). Uncertain Justice, Canadian Women and Capital Punishment 1754 - 1953. Toronto: Dundurn Press / The Osgoode Society for Canadian Legal History. pp. totales= 258. ISBN 9781550023442. OCLC 44751697.
- Saint-Martin, Lori (1997). "Figures de la sorcière dans l'écriture des femmes au Québec". Contre-voix: Essais de critique au féminin. Essais critiques (in French). Quebec: Nuit Blanche. pp. 165–189. ISBN 9782921053778. OCLC 38430897.
