= Ludger-Duvernay Prize =

Canadian literary award

The Ludger-Duvernay Prize is a Quebec award created in 1944 and named in honour of journalist Ludger Duvernay. It is awarded by the Saint-Jean-Baptiste Society of Montreal to recognize the merits of a person whose competence and influence in the literary field serve the best interests of Quebec. A laureate must be a native of Quebec and considered professional in the world of letters. The prize had been awarded every three years since 1991; it has not been awarded since 2015.

== Prize winners ==
- 1944 - Guy Frégault
- 1945 - Germaine Guèvremont
- 1946 - Robert Charbonneau
- 1947 - Esdras Minville
- 1948 - Félix-Antoine Savard
- 1949 - Jean Bruchési
- 1950 - Alain Grandbois
- 1951 - Léo-Paul Desrosiers
- 1952 - Lionel Groulx
- 1953 - Robert de Rocquebrune
- 1954 - Robert Choquette
- 1955 - Philippe Panneton
- 1956 - Gabrielle Roy
- 1957 - Rina Lasnier
- 1958 - Anne Hébert
- 1959 - Victor Barbeau
- 1960 - Gérard Morisset
- 1961 - François-Albert Angers
- 1962 - Roger Duhamel
- 1963 - Jean Simard
- 1964 - Alfred Desrochers
- 1966 - Marcel Trudel
- 1967 - Robert Rumilly
- 1968 - Pierre Perrault
- 1969 - Luc Lacourcière
- 1970 - Michel Brunet
- 1971 - Pierre Vadeboncœur
- 1972 - Jacques Ferron
- 1973 - Jacques Godbout
- 1974 - Marcel Rioux
- 1975 - Robert-Lionel Séguin
- 1976 - Jacques Brossard
- 1977 - Gaston Miron
- 1978 - Jacques Brault
- 1979 - Michèle Lalonde
- 1980 - Claude Jasmin
- 1981 - Victor-Lévy Beaulieu
- 1982 - Jean Éthier-Blais
- 1984 - Louis Caron
- 1987 - Gérald Godin
- 1989 - Marie-Claire Blais
- 1990 - Jacques Folch-Ribas
- 1991 - Pierre Morency
- 1994 - Fernand Ouellette
- 1997 - Marie Laberge
- 2011 - Yves Beauchemin
- 2013 - Francine Ouellette
- 2015 - Dany Laferrière
