= Denise Desautels =

Canadian poet and writer

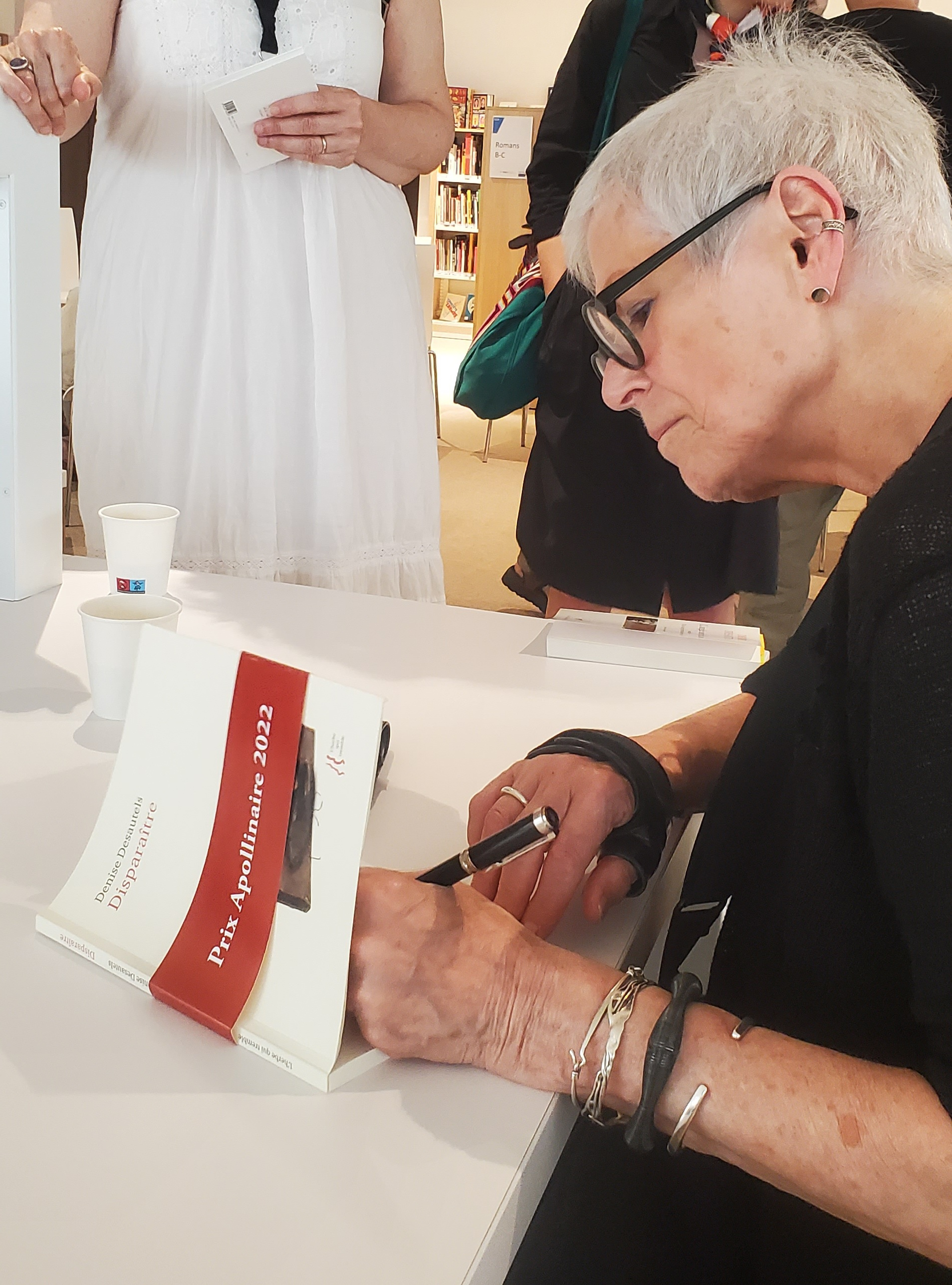
- Denise Desautels signing her book Disparaître in a university library (Paris, 2023)
- Born: 4 April 1945 (age 81); Montreal, Quebec, Canada
- Writing career
- Genres: Poetry, radio plays
- Notable awards: Governor's General Award (1993), Prix Athanase-David (2009), Prix Guillaume-Apollinaire (2022)

Denise Desautels (born 4 April 1945) is a québécoise poet and writer.

She was a vice-president of the Académie des lettres du Québec. She participates in Metropolis bleu.

== Honours ==
- 1990 – Prix du Gouverneur général
- 1990 – Prix littéraires du Journal de Montréal
- 1991 – Grand Prix du Festival international de la poésie de la Fondation Les Forges
- 1992 – Prix de poésie Terrasses Saint-Sulpice (for Le saut de l'ange)
- 1993 – Prix Le Signet d'Or (for Le saut de l'ange)
- 1993 – Prix du Gouverneur général (for Le saut de l'ange)
- 1999 – Prix littéraires Radio-Canada, Ma Sisyphe
- 2000 – Prix de la Société des écrivains Canadiens
- 2001 – Prix de la Société des écrivains Canadiens
- 2009 – Prix Athanase-David
- 2010 – Prix de littérature francophone Jean Arp
- 2014 – Grand prix Québecor du Festival international de la poésie
- 2015 – Prix Hervé-Foulon (for Ce fauve, le bonheur)
- 2022 – Prix Guillaume-Apollinaire (for Disparaitre)

== Bibliography ==
=== Poetry ===
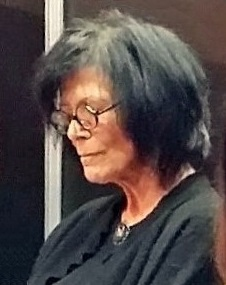
Denise Desautels at SLM 2018

- Comme miroirs en feuilles, éditions du Noroît, 1975
- Marie, tout s'éteignait en moi, éditions du Noroît, 1977
- La Promeneuse et l'oiseau, éditions du Noroît, 1980
- En état d'urgence, éd. Estérel, 1982
- L'Écran, précédé de Aires du temps, éditions du Noroît, 1983
- Dimanche : textualisation, éditions de la Nouvelle Barre du Jour, 1985
- Nous en reparlerons sans doute, collaboration with Anne-Marie Alonzo, éd. Trois, 1986
- La Répétition, éditions de la Nouvelle Barre du Jour, 1986
- Écritures / ratures, éditions du Noroît, 1986
- Le Signe discret, éd. Pierre-Alain Pingoud, 1987
- Un livre de Kafka à la main suivi de La Blessure, éditions du Noroît, 1987
- Mais la menace est une belle extravagance, éditions du Noroît, 1989, Prix de poésie du Journal de Montréal
- Leçons de Venise, éditions du Noroît, 1990, prix de la Fondation Les Forges
- Tombeau de René Payant, Éditions Trois, 1991
- Black words, Collectif Génération, 1991
- Le saut de l'ange, éditions du Noroît, 1992, prix du Gouverneur général du Canada et de la revue Estuaire
- Théâtre pourpre, Éditions Jean-Luc Herman, 1993
- Cimetières : la rage muette, éditions Dazibao, 1995
- L'écho, la chambre, la nuit, Éditions Raina Lupa, 1996
- La Passion du sens, éditions Roselin, 1996
- L'Acier le Bleu, Éditions Raina Lupa, 1996
- Le Vif de l'étreinte, livre-objet, Éditions Roselin, 1996
- "Ma joie", crie t'elle, éditions du Noroît, 1997
- De la douceur, livre-objet, Éditions Roselin et Éditions La cour pavée, 1997
- Tombeau de Lou, éditions du Noroît, 2000, prix de la Société des écrivains Canadiens et de la Société Radio-Canada
- Parfois les astres, livre-objet, Roselin, 2000
- Novembre, éditions Roselin et La Cour Pavée, 2001
- Architectures, livre-objet, ed. Tandem, La Sétérée et Roselin, 2001
- Pendant la mort, éditions Québec Amérique, 2002
- Avant l'aurore, in Noir, portfolio réalisé en collaboration avec des artistes, Noria Éditions/Karin Haddad, 2002
- Le Corps collectionneur, Les Heures Bleues, 2003
- L'Étrangère, n^{o} 4–5, Lettre volée, 2003
- La Marathonienne, La courte échelle, 2003
- Une Solitude exemplaire, eaux-fortes de Jacques Clerc, Éditions La Sétérée, 2004
- Mémoires parallèles, selection and introduction by Paul Chamberland, éditions du Noroît, 2004
- L'Enfant mauve, livre-objet en collaboration avec Jacques Fournier et Jacqueline Ricard, Éditions Roselin et Éditions de la Cour pavée, 2004
- Ce désir toujours : un abécédaire, Lemeac, 2005
- L'Œil au ralenti, éditions du Noroit, 2007
- Le Cœur et autres mélancolies, Éditions Apogée, 2007
- Ailleurs – Épisode I : Charleville-Mézières 2008 : une année en poésie (collective), éd. Musée Rimbaud, Charleville-Mézières, 2009
- Quai Rimbaud, livre d'artiste en collaboration avec Jacques Fournier et Gabriel Belgeonne, Éditions Roselin et Éditions Tandem, 2009
- Ailleurs – Épisode II : Charleville-Mézières 2009 : une année en poésie (collective), éd. Musée Rimbaud, Charleville-Mézières, 2010
- L'Angle noir de la joie, coédition Éditions Arfuyen (Paris) et Édition du Noroît (Montréal), 2011 – à l'occasion de la remise du Prix de littérature francophone Jean Arp
- Sans toi, je n'aurais pas regardé si haut. Tableaux d'un parc, éditions du Noroît, 2013
- Le Baiser d’Hélène, Saint-Bonnet-Elvert, France, Éditions du Petit Flou, coll. "Dans la cour des filles", 2016
- D'où surgit parfois un bras d'horizon : inventaires 2012-2016, Montréal, Éditions du Noroît, 2017, (ISBN 978-2-89766-012-3, 978-2-89766-013-0)
- Noirs, en collaboration avec Erika Povilonyté, France, Éditeur L'atelier des noyers, Coll. Carnets de couleurs, 2018, (ISBN 978-2-490185-02-3)
- Disparaître (Détail), Saint-Bonnet-Elvert, France, Éditions du Petit Flou, coll. "Dans la cour des filles", 2018
- L'heure violette, France, Éditeur L'atelier des noyers, Coll. Carnets de couleurs, 2020, (ISBN 978-2-490185-32-0)
- Disparaître : autour de 11 œuvres de Sylvie Cotton, Montréal, Éditions du Noroît, 2021, (ISBN 978-2-89766-306-3)
- Disparaître, Autour de onze œuvres de Sylvie Cotton, Billère, L'herbe qui tremble, 2021, (ISBN 978-2-491462-12-3) - Guillaume-Apollinaire Award 2022

=== Radio drama ===
- Le Cri, Radio Canada, 1982
- Les Gitanes, Radio Canada, 1985
- Voix, texte, awards by the French-speaking public radios Radio Canada, Radio France and Radio Suisse normande, 1987
- Venise (variations sur l'utopie), Radio Canada, Radio France and Radio Suisse normande, 1989
- La Violoncelliste, Radio Canada, 1990
- La Voix de Martha, poetic fiction, Radio Canada, 1990
- La Répétition, poetry adapted for the radio, Romandy, 1993

=== Narrative literature ===
- Ce fauve, le Bonheur, éditions de l'Hexagone, 2005

=== Letters ===
- Lettres à Cassandre, en collaboration avec Anne-Marie Alonzo, Trois, 1994

=== Works in English ===
- The Night Will be Insistent: Selected Poems, 1987–2002 Translated by Daniel Sloate, Guernica Editions, 2007, ISBN 9781550712391
- Things That Fall, Translated by Alisa Belanger, Guernica Editions, 2013, ISBN 9781550713732
- Lessons from Venice, Translated by Alisa Belanger, Victoria, Ekstasis Editions, 2020, ISBN 9781771713702
