= Yvan Lamonde =

Canadian academic and historian (1944–2025)

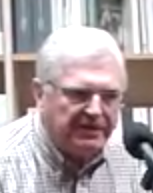
- Lamonde in 2019
- Born: 30 March 1944; Saint-Tite, Quebec, Canada
- Died: 26 August 2025 (aged 81); Sorel‐Tracy
- Education: Université de Montréal; Université Laval
- Occupation(s): Academic, historian

Yvan Lamonde (30 March 1944 – 26 August 2025) was a Canadian academic and historian. He was a professor at McGill University specializing in Quebec literature.

== Life and career ==
Born in Saint-Tite on 30 March 1944, Lamonde graduated from the Université de Montréal and the Université Laval. He extensively studied the sociography of Quebec, believing that the Quebec identity was based more on the liberal tradition of North America than on French culture and Roman Catholicism, as evidenced in his books Histoire sociale des idées au Québec and Brève histoire des idées au Québec. In 2008, he published an autobiography titled Historien et citoyen: navigations au long cours in collaboration with Claude Corbo. He was a member of the Académie des lettres du Québec, the Royal Society of Canada, and the Société des Dix. His works can be found at the McGill University Archives.

Lamonde died on 26 August 2025, at the age of 81.

== Publications ==
- Historiographie de la philosophie au Québec (1853-1970) (1972)
- La philosophie et son enseignement au Québec (1665-1920) (1980)
- La librairie et l’édition à Montréal, 1776-1920 (1991)
- Histoire sociale des idées au Québec (2000)
- Allégeances et dépendances : l'histoire d'une ambivalence identitaire (2001)
- La modernité au Québec. Tome 1. La crise de l'homme et de l'esprit, 1929-1939 (2011)
- Louis-Antoine Dessaulles, 1818-1895 (2013)
- La modernité au Québec. Tome 2. La victoire différée du présent sur le passé, 1939-1965 (2016)
- Violences coloniales et résistance patriote : au "bourg pourri" de Sorel et à Saint-Ours-sur-Richelieu (1780-1838) (2017)
- Un coin dans la mémoire. L'hiver de notre mécontentement : essai (2017)
- Aux quatre chemins : Papineau, Parent, La Fontaine et le révolutionnaire Côté en 1837 et en 1838 (2018)
- Emerson, Thoreau et Brownson au Québec. Éléments pour une comparaison des milieux intellectuels en Nouvelle-Angleterre et au Bas-Canada (1830-1860) (2018)
- Louis-Joseph Papineau. Un demi-siècle de combat : interventions publiques (2019)
- Brève histoire des idées au Québec (2019)
- Émonder et sauver l'arbre : Maurice Blain, la laïcité et la transition intellectuelle après Borduas (2021)

== Honors and distinctions ==
- Nomination for the Governor General's Award for French-language non-fiction (1980)
- Governor General's Award for French-language non-fiction (1995)
- Prix Maxime Raymond of the Killam Trusts (1996)
- Prix Richard-Arès (2000)
- Médaille Marie-Tremaine (2001)
- Prix Raymond-Klibansky (2001)
- Prix Percy-W.-Foy (2001)
- Medal of the Académie des lettres du Québec (2004)
- Nomination for the Governor General's Award for French-language non-fiction (2004)
- Prix Acfas André-Laurendeau (2004)
- Médaille de l'Assemblée nationale (2005)
- Prix de la présidence de l'Assemblée nationale (2005)
- Prix de la présidence de l'Assemblée nationale (2012)
- Prix Condorcet (2013)
