= Gilbert La Rocque =

Canadian author (1943-1984)

Gilbert La Rocque (April 29, 1943 - November 26, 1984) was a Canadian writer from Quebec. He was most noted for his novel Les masques, which was a finalist for the Governor General's Award for French-language fiction at the 1980 Governor General's Awards and won the Prix Suisse-Canada in 1981.

Born in Montreal, La Rocque worked as a bank teller and as a clerk at the city hall of Montréal-Nord prior to the publication of his first novel Le Nombril in 1970. During his writing career, he was also editorial director of the publishing houses Éditions l'Homme, Éditions de l'Aurore and Éditions Québec-Amérique.

He died of a brain tumor in 1984. Following his death, his correspondence with writer Gérard Bessette was published in 1994.

== Works ==
=== Novels ===
- Le Nombril (1970)
- Corridors (1971)
- Après la boue (1972)
- Serge d'entre les morts (1976)
- Les Masques (1980)
- Le Passager (1984)

=== Plays ===
- Le Refuge (1979)

=== Other ===
- Provencher, le dernier des coureurs de bois (1974)
- Le Voleur (1976, with Claude Jodoin)
- Gérard Bessette et Gilbert La Rocque - correspondance (1994)
