= 1980 Governor General's Awards =

Canadian literary award

Each winner of the 1980 Governor General's Awards for Literary Merit was selected by a panel of judges administered by the Canada Council for the Arts.

== English ==
Category	Winner	Nominated
Fiction	George Bowering, Burning Water	Susan Musgrave, The Charcoal Burners; Leon Rooke, Fat Woman
Non-fiction	Jeffrey Simpson, Discipline of Power: The Conservative Interlude and the Liberal Restoration	John Fraser, The Chinese: Portrait of a People; Donald MacKay, Scotland Farewell: The People of the Hector
Poetry or drama	Stephen Scobie, McAlmon's Chinese Opera	Douglas Lochhead, High Marsh Road

== French ==
Category	Winner	Nominated
Fiction	Pierre Turgeon, La première personne	Gilbert La Rocque, Les masques; Hélène Ouvrard, La noyante
Non-fiction	Maurice Champagne-Gilbert, La famille et l'homme à délivrer du pouvoir	Jean-Luc Hétu, Croissance humaine et instinct spirituel; Yvan Lamonde, La philosophie et son enseignement au Québec
Poetry or drama	Michel van Schendel, De l'oeil et de l'écoute	Nicole Brossard, Amantes; Gilles Cyr, Ce lieu
