= Damase Potvin =

Canadian journalist and writer (1882–1964)

Damase Potvin Désignation de 2 avenue (Baie-Comeau et Montréal) et 3 rues (Québec (ville), Lévis et Saguenay (ville)) en son nom
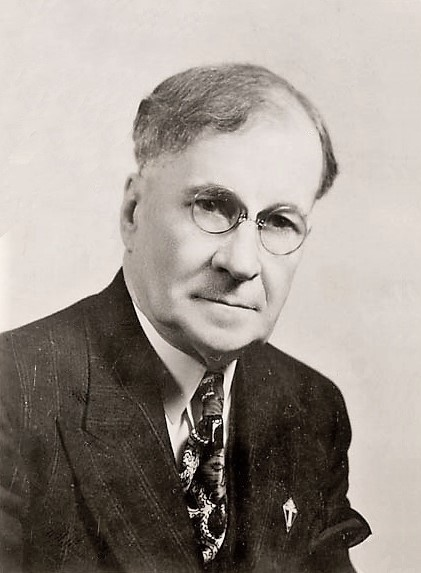
- Born: October 16, 1882
- Died: June 9, 1964 (aged 81)
- Occupations: Journalist and writer
- Writing career
- Language: French
- Years active: 36

Damase Potvin (born October 16, 1882 – 1964) was a writer and journalist born in Bagotville, Saguenay, Quebec. He is the son of Charles Potvin and Julie Hudon.

== Biography ==
He obtained his baccalauréat ès arts at the Séminaire de Chicoutimi where he contributed to the newspaper of the Institution L'Oiseau-Mouche, then enrolled, in 1894, in a business course. In 1903, he entered the White Fathers of Africa and, unable to adapt to the climate of Algiers, he returned to the country in 1905. Subsequently, he opted for journalism and in 1905 founded the first newspaper in the Saguenay region, Le Travailleur. He directed Le Progrès du Saguenay (1906) for a year. He then moved to Quebec where he was assistant editor at La Semaine Commerciale and La Vérité, then editor-in-chief at Quotidien in Lévis. He then founded Le Petit Québécois, in which he wrote controversial columns under the pseudonym of Jean Yves. In 1910, he moved to Montreal where he worked for Devoir (1910), while contributing to various newspapers and magazines: Chasse et Pêche, Culture, Saturday, and French Canada. In July 1918, he founded the review Le Terroir, organ of the Society of Arts, Sciences and Letters, which was published until 1940.

In December 1917 he co-founded, with Georges Morisset and Alonzo Cinq-Mars, the Society of Arts, Sciences and Letters of Quebec. In 1938, he organized the Quebec Journalists Club. He was a member of the Press Gallery in the Parliament of Quebec, of the Montreal Historical Society and of Quebec, of the Canadian Institute of Quebec, of the Literary School of Montreal, and the Society of French-Canadian Writers.

In 1938, he received the Prix David for his novel Peter McLeod and in 1940, the Prize of the Ministry of Mines for his novel Sous le signe du quartz. His work is mainly focused on the terroir and the return to the land.

The Damase-Potvin Literary Prize is awarded in his memory.

From 1985 to 1995, the Damase-Potvin Prize was awarded to scientists on the occasion of the Saguenay–Lac-Saint-Jean Regional Scientific Merit.

== Works published ==
- Restons Chez Nous, Québec, Guay, 1908.
- Le Membre: roman de mœurs politiques québécoises, Québec, L'Événement, 1916.
- l'Appel de la Terre, Québec, Imprimerie de l'événement, 1919.
- Le Tour du Saguenay, 1920.
- Le Français: roman paysan du Pays de Québec, Montréal, 1925.
- La Baie: récit d'un vieux colon canadien-français, Montréal, Éd. Édouard-Garand, 1925.
- Sur la Grand'Route : nouvelles, contes et croquis, 1927.
- Les Îlets Jérémie: histoire d'une ancienne mission du domaine du roi, Québec, Éd. du Terroir, 1928.
- En Zig-Zag sur la Côte et dans l'Île, Québec, 1929.
- Plaisant Pays de Saguenay, Québec, 1931.
- La Robe Noire: récit des temps héroïques où fut fondée la Nouvelle France, Mercure de France, 1932.
- La Rivière-à-mars, 1934.
- Peter McLeod, 1937.
- Puyjalon: Le solitaire de l'Ile-à-la chasse, 1938.
- Sous le signe du quartz, Montréal, Éd. Bernard-Valiquette, 1940.
- Un ancien contait..., Montréal, Éd. Bernard-Valiquette, 1942.
- Les oubliés. Écrivains nordiques, Québec, Édition Roch Poulin, 1944, 237 p.
- Thomas, le dernier de nos coureurs de bois. Le Parc des Laurentides, Québec, Éditions Garneau ltée, 1945, 272 p.
- Le Saint-Laurent et ses îles, Québec, Garneau, 1945.
- La "Dame française" du duc de Kent : récits historiques canadiens, Québec, Éd. Garneau, 1948.
- Le roman d'un roman. Louis Hémon à Péribonka, Québec, Éditions du Quartier Latin, 1950, 191 p.
- Le Roi du Golfe. le Dr P-E Fortin, ancien commandant de « La Canadienne », Québec, Éditions du Quartier Latin, 1952, 181 p.
- Trois petits clochers. Émouvante petite odyssée de colonisation sur la Côte-Nord, Québec, 1953, 94 p.
- Un héros de l'air: l'heureuse aventure de Roméo Vachon, 1955, 62 p.
- La Baie des Ha! Ha!. histoire et description, légendes et anecdotes. Paroisses, vieilles familles, gens et choses de la région, Baie des Ha! Ha!, Édition de la Chambre de commerce de la Baie des Ha! Ha!, 1957, 427 p.
- Contes et Croquis
- L'Appel des Souvenirs
- The Saguenay Trip

== Magazines and newspapers ==
- Je Vois Tout
- L'Oiseau-Mouche
- L'Événement
- Le Petit Québécois
- Le Progrès du Saguenay
- Revue Populaire
- Samedi
- Le Terroir
- Le Soleil

== Bibliography ==
- (in German) Klaus-Dieter Ertler: Damase Potvin, "La robe noire", en: Der kanadische Roman der dreißiger Jahre. Eine ideologieanalytische Darstellung. Canadiana Romanica, 14. Max Niemeyer, Tübingen 2000; repr. De Gruyter, Berlin 2015, pp 160 – 185.
- (in French) Column "À la découverte de notre littérature" (Discovering our literature), by Yvon Paré, journal Le Quotidien, 14 juillet 1979, p. 8, biographical summary of Damase Potvin.

== Honors ==
- 1938 – Prix David
