= Jean Bruchési =

Canadian writer, historian, public servant and diplomat

Jean Bruchési, FRSC (9 April 1901 – 2 October 1979) was a Canadian writer, historian, public servant, and diplomat. He was the president of the Royal Society of Canada for 1953–4.

He was the son of Charles Bruchési, KC and the nephew of Paul Bruchési, Archbishop of Montreal.

In 1937, he was appointed Under-Secretary of State of the Province of Quebec.

From 1959, Bruchési served as Canada's ambassador to Spain, Morocco and Argentina (with concurrent accreditation to Paraguay and Uruguay).

After his death in 1979, he was entombed at the Notre Dame des Neiges Cemetery in Montreal.

== Distinctions and awards ==
- 1949 - Léo-Pariseau Prize
- 1949 - Ludger-Duvernay Prize
- 1951 - J. B. Tyrrell Historical Medal
- 1959 - Medal of the Académie des lettres du Québec

== Personal life ==
He married Berthe Denis on 20 June 1930.

Professional and academic associations
Preceded by Guilford Bevil Reed	President of the Royal Society of Canada; 1953–1954	Succeeded by Edgar William Richard Steacie
