= La marche à l'amour =

"La marche à l'amour" is a poem by Gaston Miron (1928–1996), one of the most studied and celebrated in Quebec poetry. It was originally published in Le nouveau journal in 1962, in a cycle of seven poems also entitled "La marche à l'amour". A slightly revised version was published in 1970 in the book L'homme rapaillé (the poem would again be revised in a later edition).

== Background to the poem ==
In one interview (http://archives.radio-canada.ca/IDCC-0-72-1234-6809/arts_culture/gaston_miron/), Miron said of "La marche à l'amour" that "all his successive failures in love were projected (in this poem) written back between 1954 to 1958" ("toutes mes expériences, mes échecs successifs dans l'amour, se sont projetés dans (ce poème) qui date de 1954 à 1958").

Several themes of the poem are clearly expressed in the different interviews Miron gave about this time of his life. Part of different interviews he gave will be highlighted below, in italics, along the description of the poem.

Gaston Miron self-described his work as similar in form to the American expressionism à la Jackson Pollock. By this, he meant that his poetry is often characterized by a succession of strong—and sometimes baffling—metaphors. "La marche à l'amour" is good example of this style.

His style has also often been characterized as espousing an "oral style" (for example, by the jury that honored him with the prix Quebec-Paris for L'homme rapaillé), although controversies abound about the exact extent of this orality (see the book "Miron ou la marche à l'amour" for some strong opposing views). What is certain, though, is that Miron integrated in his poems, notably in "La marche à l'amour", a few expressions of a popular range that he does not hesitate to use in a different context to create an effect. This can be illustrated here by the use of "délabre" (wretched) and "au bout du rouleau" (at the end of one's tether) in the verse "Je m'en vais en délabre au bout de mon rouleau" (literally, I go in wretched (conditions) at the end of my tether) (English translations by D.G.Jones, from Earth and Embers of Guernica Editions).

This theme of the poem, to persist looking for love despite obstacles, is revealed at the end of the poem. Miron said that "(he) never renounced to the quest (to find love). I had deep dejection, but life is so strong that it always achieves to get back on top, like a "rooted" diving refusing to be uprooted. Like I said in "La marche à l'amour", I refuse tragedy, I refuse failure, and I say we must always yield a 101st chance to love: "j'ai du chiendent d'achigan plein l'âme". (Mais je n'ai jamais renoncé (à cette recherche). J'ai des accablements profonds, mais la vie est tellement forte, qu'elle reprend toujours le dessus, comme une plongée racineuse qui ne veut pas déraciner. Comme je le dis dans "La marche à l'amour", je refuse la tragédie, je refuse l'échec, et je dis qu'il faut toujours donner la 101e chance à l'amour: "j'ai du chiendent d'achigan plein l'âme").
