= Paul Toupin =

Canadian journalist and writer (1918–1993)

- Born: December 7, 1918; Montreal, Quebec, Canada
- Died: March 8, 1993 (aged 74); Montreal, Quebec, Canada
- Education: Collège Jean-de-Brébeuf, Sorbonne, Columbia University, Aix-Marseille University
- Occupations: Journalist, essayist, playwright
- Writing career
- Language: French
- Notable works: Brutus, Souvenirs pour demain, L'Écrivain et son théâtre
- Notable awards: Prix David (1952), Governor General's Award (1960)

Paul Toupin (December 7, 1918 – March 8, 1993) was a Quebec journalist, essayist and playwright.

== Early life and education ==
Born in Montreal on December 7, 1918, he studied at Collège Jean-de-Brébeuf, the Sorbonne, Columbia University and Aix-Marseille University.

== Career ==
In addition to his writing and journalism, he taught at the Université de Sherbrooke and Loyola University.

His plays included Le Choix (1951), Brutus (1952), Le Mensonge (1960), Chacun son amour (1961) and Son dernier rôle (1979). Alongside poet Paul Chamberland and novelist Jean-Paul Pinsonneault, he was one of the first prominent openly gay writers in Quebec literature, addressing gay themes in his 1964 essay collection L'Écrivain et son théâtre and writing more openly about his own sexuality in his memoirs Mon mal vient de plus loin (1969) and Le cœur a ses raisons (1971).

He won Quebec's Prix David in 1952 for Brutus, and the Governor General's Award for French-language non-fiction at the 1960 Governor General's Awards for Souvenirs pour demain.

== Personal life ==
He died in Montreal on March 8, 1993. The Paul Toupin Archives are kept in the Montreal archives center of the Bibliothèque et Archives nationales du Québec.

== Honors ==
- 1950 : Prix David
- 1952 : Prix de littérature de la province de Québec
- 1960 : Governor General's Award for French-language non-fiction
- Member of the Académie des lettres du Québec
