= Margaret Avison =

Canadian poet (1918–2007)

- Born: April 23, 1918; Galt, Ontario, Canada
- Died: July 31, 2007 (aged 89); Toronto, Ontario
- Education: Victoria University
- Writing career
- Language: English
- Genre: Poetry
- Notable works: Winter Sun; The Dumbfounding; Concrete and Wild Carrot; No Time
- Notable awards: Governor General's Award; Officer of the Order of Canada; Griffin Poetry Prize

Margaret Avison (April 23, 1918 – July 31, 2007) was a Canadian poet who twice won Canada's Governor General's Award and also won the Griffin Poetry Prize. According to the Encyclopædia Britannica, "Her work has been praised for the beauty of its language and images."

== Early life and education ==
Avison, the daughter of a Methodist minister, was born in Galt, Ontario, in 1918. She moved to Regina, Saskatchewan, in 1920, and Calgary, Alberta, a few years later. Her family moved again, in 1930, to Toronto, Ontario. She attended Alma College, located in St. Thomas, Ontario, ca. 1935. As a teenager she was hospitalized for anorexia.

She attended Victoria College at the University of Toronto, entering in 1936 and getting her B.A. in 1940 (and returning to pick up her M.A. in 1965). Before she finished her B.A. she was a published poet; the poem "Gatineau" appeared in the Canadian Poetry Magazine in 1939. Additionally, she began publishing poetry in the college magazine, Acta Victoriana.

== Career ==
Besides writing poetry, Avison worked a variety of other jobs, such as working as a file clerk, proofreader, and editor. She also worked in the Registrar's Office and Library at the University of Toronto. Avison worked as a librarian, was a social worker at the Presbyterian Church Mission in Toronto, and taught at Scarborough College. She wrote most of her poetry in her spare time, and chose paying jobs which left her time to write. She didn't apply for a Canada Council grant.

In 1951, Avison's junior high school textbook, History of Ontario, was published.

As mentioned previously, Avison's poem "Gatineau" appeared in Canadian Poetry Magazine in 1939. In 1943, anthologist A.J.M. Smith included her poetry in his Book of Canadian Poetry. (In her autobiography, she mentions a "chaste skinny dip" with Smith.)

In 1956, Avison received a Guggenheim Memorial Foundation Grant; she spent eight months in the United States and was able to attend classes at the universities of Chicago and Indiana. She ghostwrote a book entitled A Doctor's Memoir and wrote her first book of poetry, Winter Sun. It was published in 1960 and won the Governor General's Award.

Avison was moved by the Hungarian Uprising of 1956 and translated eight Hungarian poems that then appeared in The Plough and The Pen - this brought recognition to various twentieth century Hungarian poets. Avison successfully completed her M.A. at the University of Toronto, but while she began a Ph.D. she did not matriculate as she did not write a thesis.

Avison converted to Christianity (from agnosticism) in 1963. She wrote about that experience in her second book of poetry, The Dumbfounding (1966).

Avison taught at Scarborough Hall, University of Toronto, between 1966 and 1968, and also volunteered at Presbyterian mission named Evangel Hall during this time. Avison was writer-in-residence at the University of Western Ontario for eight months in 1973. From 1973 to 1978, she worked in the archives division of the Canadian Broadcasting Corporation (CBC). In 1978, she joined Toronto's Mustard Seed Mission as a secretary, and worked there until her retirement in 1986.

Avison became an Officer of the Order of Canada in 1984.

Her fourth collection of poems, No Time, came out in 1990, and won her a second Governor General's Award.

In 2003, Avison's Concrete and Wild Carrot won the Griffin Poetry Prize. "Lauding Avison as 'a national treasure,' Griffin Poetry Prize judges praised the 'sublimity' and 'humility' of her poetry -- which they described as 'some of the most humane, sweet and profound poetry of our time.'"

Avison was honoured for her contributions to Canadian literature by various honorary degrees: Acadia University (1983), York University (1985), and Victoria University (1988).

Margaret Avison died in Toronto on July 31, 2007, age 89, from undisclosed causes.

== Writing ==
Avison can be considered a spiritual or metaphysical poet; "her work is often described by reviewers as introspective, observant, and deeply spiritual." "Many critics compare her work to the great metaphysical poets of the 17th century."

The Encyclopædia Britannica describes her as a "Canadian poet who revealed the progress of an interior spiritual journey in her three successive volumes of poetry," referring to her first three books, Winter Sun, The Dumbfounding, and sunblue.

With Winter Sun, "Avison established herself as a difficult and introspective poet given to private images and subtle shadings of emotion that challenge and frustrate the reader" (says The Canadian Encyclopedia). "These complexities in her writing conceal a deeply religious and vulnerable sensibility." "In this volume the poet's subject matter varies from environmental destruction and the plight of the poor to metaphysical ponderings and playful explorations of language. Avison's emphasis is on looking at the familiar in new and thought-provoking ways." "One of Avison's principal concerns in Winter Sun is perception, and she consistently emphasizes looking at the familiar in new and thought-provoking ways. Ernest H. Redekop has argued that 'there is a profound sense in Avison's poems that the world must not be forced into ordinary limits of sight and articulation.' In the poem "Perspective," for instance, Avison attacks linear perspective."

The Dumbfounding was "a more accessible record of spiritual discovery, and a more revealing account of the unmasked, narrative 'I.'" In this work, "Avison expresses her wonder at her own rediscovered faith. It employs the same poetic techniques as Winter Sun, but here the poet is no longer searching for meaning. "Truth" has been identified as the presence of a personal, loving, and forgiving God."

"This was further developed in sunblue (1978), a combination of social concern and moral values fused by religious conviction and a continuing restatement of personal faith." "Both sunblue and No Time reconfirm Avison's commitment to her Christian faith.... In conjunction with their Christian themes, Avison's poems often celebrate the creative power of the imagination as well as examining the concept of paradoxes and depicting people and landscapes from conflicting viewpoints."

"Avison has the reputation of being a cerebral poet. Her work has been characterized as 'intellectual'" and 'deliberate'; her use of word-play, disconcerting shifts in viewpoint, complex metaphors, and literary allusions make her poetry a challenge to read." "The thing with her poetry is that you must grapple with it, it just does not open up. Its rewards come only to those are willing to make the effort," said Zezulka. "Her poems were not snacks, they were full meals."

"Reviewers have praised the poet for using complex language not as an end in itself, but to accurately convey her subject matter: the love and power of God." While "some secularist critics find her post-conversion poetry too dogmatic," her defenders "claim that the purpose of Avison's poetry goes beyond that of simple religious proselytizing."

Reviewing Avison's posthumous collection, Listening: Last Poems (2007), poet Judith Fitzgerald wrote of her: "An original, an authentic visionary ... Avison praises Creation in all its transplendent awesome/awful mutations."

The University of Manitoba Archives & Special Collections holds the Margaret Avison Fonds. The fonds consist of textual records, photographs, audio-cassettes, compact discs, computer- diskettes, and CD-ROMs. Textual materials include, but are not limited to, unpublished poetry, correspondence, theses, essays, and poems. Margaret Calverley has written about this collection in her article "The Avison Collection at the University of Manitoba: Poems 1929-1989."

== Publications ==
=== Poetry ===
- Winter Sun. Toronto: U of Toronto P, 1960. London, UK: Routledge, Kegan Paul, 1960.
- The Dumbfounding. New York: Norton, 1966.
- The Cosmic Chef Glee & Perloo Memorial Society under the direction of Captain Poetry presents an evening of concrete (poems by Margaret Avison [and others] edited by B.P. Nichol.); courtesy Oberon Cement Works. Ottawa: Oberon P, 1970.
- sunblue. Hantsport, NS: Lancelot P, 1978.
- Winter Sun/ The Dumbfounding: poems, 1940-66. Toronto: McClelland & Stewart, 1982.
- Margaret Avison: Selected Poems. Toronto: Oxford UP, 1991.
- No Time. Hantsport, NS: Lancelot P, 1989; London, ON: Brick Books, 1998.
- Not Yet but Still. Hantsport, NS: Lancelot P, 1997; London, ON: Brick Books, 1998.
- Concrete and Wild Carrot. London, ON: Brick Books, 2002. (winner of the 2003 Canadian Griffin Poetry Prize)
- Always Now: The Collected Poems. (in three volumes) Erin, ON: Porcupine's Quill, 2003–2005.
- Momentary Dark. Toronto: McClelland & Stewart, 2006.
- Listening: The Last Poems of Margaret Avison. Toronto: McClelland & Stewart, 2009.

=== Prose ===
- I am Here and Not Not-There: An Autobiography. Porcupine's Quill, 2009
- A Kind of Perseverance. Hantsport, N.S.: Lancelot Press, 1994
- A Doctor's Memoirs (from papers and conversations with Dr. A. I. Wolinsky) Macmillan, 1960
- Acta Sanctorum (translation in collaboration with Ilona Duczynska & Peter Owen, 1966)
- History of Ontario [for Grade VII] [illustrations by Selwyn Dewdney]. Toronto : W. J. Gage, 1951.
- The research compendium; review and abstracts of graduate research, 1942–1962. [Toronto] University of Toronto Press [c1964]

Source for list of publications: "100 Canadian Poets" and the Margaret Avison page at Canadian Poetry Online].

== Works on Margaret Avison ==
=== Books ===
- Kent, David, ed. Lighting Up The Terrain: The Poetry of Margaret Avison. Toronto: ECW, 1987.
- Kent, David A. Margaret Avison and Her Works. Toronto: ECW, 1989.
- Mazoff, Chaim D. Waiting for the Son: Images of Release and Restoration in Margaret Avison's Poetry. Dunvegan, Ont.: Cormorant, 1989.

=== Articles ===
- Anderson, Mia. "Conversation with the Star Messenger: An Enquiry into Margaret Avison's Winter Sun." Studies in Canadian Literature/Etudes en Literature Canadienne (SCL), 6.1 (1981): 82–132.
- Bowen, Deborah. "Phoenix from the Ashes: Lorna Crozier and Margaret Avison in Contemporary Mourning." Canadian Poetry: Studies, Documents, Reviews. 40 (1997): 46–57.
- Calverley, Margaret. "'Service Is Joy': Margaret Avison's Sonnet Sequence in Winter Sun."Essays on Canadian Writing. 50 (1993): 210-30.
- "The Avison Collection at the University of Manitoba: Poems 1929-89." Canadian Poetry: Studies, Documents, Reviews. 28 (1991): 54–84.
- Cohn-Sfetcu, Ofelia. "To Live in Abundance of Life: Time in Canadian Literature." Canadian Literature. 76 (1978): 25–36.
- Guptara, Prabhu S. "A Dark Reservoir of Gladness: Margaret Avison's Third Volume of Verse."The Literary Criterion. 16.1 (1981): 42-45.
- Jones, Lawrence M. "A Core of Brilliance: Margaret Avison's Achievement." Canadian Literature. 38 (1968): 50–57.
- Kent, David A. "Wholehearted Poetry; Halfhearted Criticism." Essays on Canadian Writing. 44 (1991): 67–78.
- Mazoff, David. "Through the Son: An Explication of Margaret Avison's 'Person.'" Canadian Poetry: Studies, Documents, Reviews. 22: (1988): 40–48.
- Moisan, Clement. "Rina Lasnier et Margaret Avison." Liberte. 108 (1976): 21–33.
- New, William H. "The Mind's (I's) (Ice): The Poetry of Margaret Avison." Twentieth Century Literature: A Scholarly and Critical Journal. 16 (1970): 185–202.
- Quinsey, K. M. "The Dissolving Jail-Break in Avison." Canadian Poetry: Studies, Documents, Reviews. 25 (1989): 21–37.
- Redekop, Ernest H. "Sun/Son Light/Light: Avison's Elemental Sunblue." Canadian Poetry: Studies, Documents, Reviews. 7 (1980): 21–37.
- Somerville, Christine. "The Shadow of Death: Margaret Avison's 'Just Left or The Night Margaret Laurence Died.'" New, W. H. (ed.). Inside the Poem: Essays and Poems in Honour of Donald Stephens. Toronto: Oxford UP, 1992: 55–59.
- Sullivan, R. "The Territory of Conscience: The Poetry of Margaret Avison." Literary Half-Yearly." 32.1 (1991): 43-55.
- Zezulka, J. M. "Refusing the Sweet Surrender: Margaret Avison's 'Dispersed Titles'" Canadian Poetry 1 (1977): 44–53.
- Zichy, Francis. "'Each in His Prison/Thinking of the Key': Images of Confinement and Liberation in Margaret Avison." Studies in Canadian Literature. 3 (1978): 232–43.

Source for list of publications: "100 Canadian Poets" and the Margaret Avison page at Canadian Poetry Online .

== See also ==
- Canadian literature
- Canadian poetry
- List of Canadian poets
- List of Canadian writers
