= Gaston Miron =

Canadian writer (1928–1996)

Gaston Miron OQ
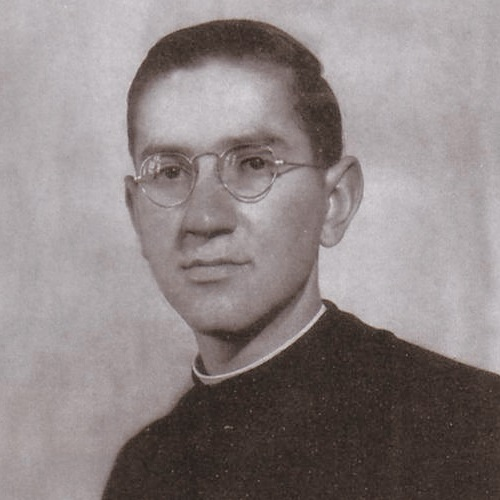
- Gaston Miron, between 1943 and 1947
- Born: 8 January 1928; Sainte-Agathe-des-Monts, Quebec, Canada
- Died: 14 December 1996 (aged 68); Montreal, Quebec, Canada
- Occupation: Poet
- Writing career
- Language: French
- Movement: Quebec's Quiet Revolution

Gaston Miron OQ (French pronunciation: [ɡastɔ̃ miˈʁɔ̃]; 8 January 1928 – 14 December 1996) was an important Quebecois poet, writer, and editor of Quebec's Quiet Revolution. His classic L'homme rapaillé (partly translated as The March to Love: Selected Poems of Gaston Miron, whose title echoes his celebrated poem La marche à l'amour) has sold over 100,000 copies and is one of the most widely read texts of the Quebecois literary canon. Committed to his people's separation from Canada and to the establishment of an independent French-speaking nation in North America, Gaston Miron remains the most important literary figure of Quebec's nationalist movement.

== Early life ==
Gaston Miron was born in Sainte-Agathe-des-Monts, in the Laurentian Mountains region, 100 kilometers north of Montreal. His father, Charles-August Miron, was a successful carpenter-entrepreneur, and his death in 1940 was the decisive event of his son's childhood. The next year, finding herself in a precarious financial situation, Gaston's mother sent her son to study as a scholarship student at a Brothers of the Sacred Heart boarding school near Granby in Montérégie. At Sacred Heart, young Miron's plan was to pursue a career in education as a teaching brother. Upon graduation, however, after working for a year in a school near Montreal, he renounced his vows and planned-for career as a schoolteacher. His long, painful march towards his vocation as a man of letters had begun.

== A young writer and the founding of the Hexagone ==
Nineteen-year old Miron moved to Montreal in 1947. Conservative Maurice Duplessis reigned as Quebec premier, and the Catholic Church dominated the society's popular and literary culture. Miron worked for a time as an organizer and leader of the Catholic youth organization, l'Order du bon temps. In the evening, he took courses at the Faculty of Social Sciences of the University of Montreal, but never earned a degree. In 1953, with Olivier Marchand, Miron published his first collection of poems, Deux Sangs ("Two Bloods") at Éditions de l'Hexagone, an artisanal publishing company founded by the authors and four of their friends. Hexagone was the first publisher in French Canada dedicated to poetry: Miron would become the central force behind its contribution to Quebecois culture over the next thirty years. Hexagone's editorial line was to establish a "national literature" and put an end to the "poet's alienation" in the society of the time. Miron quickly signed young and innovative poets like Jean-Guy Pilon and Fernand Ouellette, thus prolonging the efforts of the modernists of the immediately preceding generation like Alain Grandbois, Paul-Marie Lapointe and Roland Giguère, who had released their first books before the Hexagone's founding and would later join its roster of authors.

From 1953 until the end of the decade, Miron worked at the Beauchemin Bookstore and other book related jobs in Montreal. In his off hours, he read manuscripts and handled the correspondence for his publishing company. In addition, Miron wrote poetry (notably La Marche à l'amour), which he occasionally published in newspapers like Le Devoir, and sometimes left in his drawer, waiting for the right word or phrase to come to mind, as he sought to perfect them. On 10 June 1957 and 31 March 1958, Miron was a candidate in Canadian federal elections in the Outremont riding of Montreal for the socialist Co-Operative Commonwealth Federation. Between 1959 and 1961, Miron lived in Paris, ostensibly to study bookmaking, but he took the opportunity to form contacts with many poets and other writers on the French literary scene.

== National poet ==
On his return to Montreal, he became involved in dozens of artistic and political circles based in the cafés around St-Louis Square, where he lived. His flamboyant style and passionate speeches made him a popular figure in the then revitalizing Plateau Mont-Royal. The poems he wrote in the early 1960s focused on the inferior status of the French language in Canada and on the turbulent Quebecois political situation. He published some of them in the new literary journals of the Quiet Revolution like Liberté and the short-lived but important Parti Pris. Many of these poems would be widely circulated in manuscript form thanks to Miron's popularity among a certain literary elite. His poetry was virtually unknown to the general public until 1966, when Jacques Brault delivered an important lecture, "Miron le Magnifique," at the University of Montréal which began: "Qui parmi nous ne connaît pas Gaston Miron?" (Who among us does not know Gaston Miron?). In the late 1960s, Miron starred in several poetry readings, the most celebrated being that of 27 March 1970, the legendary "Nuit de la Poésie," which attracted an audience of 4000 people to the Latin Quarter's Gesù Theatre. In 1969, after a brief affair with her mother, he became the father of his only child, Emmanuelle, whom he raised.

Near the end of the 1960s, many friends and colleagues pressured Miron to allow his dispersed works to be published as a book. Despite his concern that his poems were not yet ready, Miron agreed and published L'homme rapaillé in 1970. The book, which alternates between touching love lyrics and painful texts expressing the alienation of French-speaking Québécois, was an instant success. Characterized by the high quality of their poetic expression, poems like La Bâteche, Monologues de l'aliénation délirante, and L'Amour et le militant owe no small debt to Quebec's oral tradition.

Shortly after the publication of his book, Miron was arrested and jailed without trial during the events of the October Crisis. This arrest solidified his commitment to politics and support for Quebec's political independence. In 1975, he published the collection Courtepointes, which would later be integrated into L'homme rapaillé. The crushing defeat of the first Quebecois referendum on independence in May 1980 was a bitter disappointment for Miron, as it was for other committed separatists. During the 1980s, Miron travelled widely, especially in France, where he enjoyed old friendships and felt at ease in his language while appreciating the praise his poetry was now receiving. The defeat of the second referendum on Quebecois independence on 30 October 1995, albeit by a narrow margin, was equally disheartening for Miron.

In December 1996 Miron died in Montreal and became the first Quebecois author to receive a state funeral.

The City of Montreal honoured the memory of Gaston Miron by giving his name to the building that currently hosts the city's arts council offices. The neoclassical building on Sherbrooke Street faces Lafontaine Park, and was the site of the city's main public library until 2002.

== Works ==
- Deux sangs (co-authored by Gaston Miron and Olivier Marchand), Montréal, Éditions de l'Hexagone, 1953.
- L'homme rapaillé, Montréal, Presses de l'Université de Montréal (for the first edition), 1970.
- Courtepointes, Ottawa, Éditions de l'Université d'Ottawa, 1975.
- The March to Love: Selected Poems of Gaston Miron (International Poetry Series). Edited by Douglas Jones. Translations by Douglas Jones, Louis Simpson, John Glassco, Marc Plourde, Brenda Fleet, Dennis Egan. Athens: Ohio University Press, 1987.
- À bout portant (correspondance 1954–1965), Éditions Lemeac, 1989. Letters exchanged between Gaston Miron and his French friend Claude Haeffely.
- Poèmes épars, edition of texts from 1947 à 1995, under the direction of Marie-Andrée Beaudet and Pierre Nepveu, Montréal, Éditions de l'Hexagone, 2003.
- Un long chemin (d'autres proses), texts in prose, under the direction of Marie-Andrée Beaudet and Pierre Nepveu, Montréal, Éditions de l'Hexagone, 2004

== Honours ==
- 1970 – Prix Québec-Paris, L'Homme rapaillé
- 1971 – Grand Prix littéraire de la Ville de Montréal
- 1972 – Prix Littéraire Canada-Communauté Française de Belgique
- 1977 – Ludger-Duvernay Prize
- 1981 – Prix Guillaume Apollinaire
- 1983 – Prix Athanase-David
- 1985 – Molson Prize
- 1988 – Prix Fleury-Mesplet
- 1990 – Médaille de l'Académie des lettres du Québec
- 1991 – Médaille de l'Académie des lettres du Québec
- 1991 – Ordre des francophones d'Amérique
- 1996 – Officier de l'Ordre national du Québec

== Works on Gaston Miron ==
- Jacques Brault. (1967). "Miron le magnifique", in Chemin faisant, Montréal, Boréal, coll. "papiers collés", 1994 [1975], p. 23–55.
- Pierre Nepveu (1979). Les mots à l'écoute, Québec, Les Presses de l'Université Laval / Éditions Nota bene, 1979 / 2002.
- Yannick Gasquy-Resch (2003). Gaston Miron, le Forcené magnifique, Éditions Hurtubise.
- Christine Tellier (2003) Jeunesse et poésie. De l'Ordre de Bon Temps aux Éditions de l'Hexagone, Montréal, Fides, 322 pp. (Nouvelles études québécoises).
- Claude Filteau (2005). L'espace poétique de Gaston Miron, preface by Jerusa Pires Ferreira, Limoges, Presses Universitaires de Limoges, coll. "Francophonie", 2005, 310 pp.
- Pierre Nepveu (2011). Gaston Miron: La vie d'un homme, Montreal, Éditions Boréal, 2011, 904 pp.
- Various popular and "pop" music artists (2011). Douze hommes rapaillés (vol. 1 and 2). Songs inspired by Miron's poems and published on two digital compact discs as well as MP3 files downloadable online.
- David Palmieri. "From Personalism to Decolonization: Gaston Miron between French Canada and Quebec," Quebec Studies 60 (2015).
