= Lise Gauvin =

Canadian writer and literary critic (born 1940)

Lise Gauvin (born October 9, 1940) is a Canadian writer and literary critic from Quebec.

== Biography ==
She was born in Quebec City and pursued literary studies at Université Laval and the University of Vienna. She went on to earn a doctorate from the Paris-Sorbonne University in 1967. In 1969, she began teaching in the French studies department at the Université de Montréal; in 1998, she became department director. She was director for the review Études françaises from 1994 to 2000. She also contributed to various publications including Le Devoir.

In 1984, she was elected president of the Association des éditeurs de périodiques culturels québécois. In 1993, she was elected to the Ordre des francophones d'Amérique for her contributions to French language literature. In 2000, she became a member of the Académie des lettres du Québec and the Royal Society of Canada. In 2005, she was named a Chevalier in the French Ordre des Palmes Académiques. Gauvin was awarded the Prix Acfas André-Laurendeau in 2007 for her work. In 2015, she was named an Officer in the National Order of Quebec.

== Selected works ==
- Fugitives short stories (1991), received the Prix des Arcades of Bologna
- L'écrivain francophone à la croisée des langues (1997), received the Prix littéraire France-Québec
- Langagement - l'écrivain et la langue au Québec (2000)
- Fabrique de la langue (2004)
