= 1960 Governor General's Awards =

Canadian literary award

Each winner of the 1960 Governor General's Awards for Literary Merit was selected by a panel of judges administered by the Canada Council for the Arts. Winners were awarded a cash prize of CA$1,000.

== Winners ==
=== English language ===
- Fiction: Brian Moore, The Luck of Ginger Coffey
- Poetry or Drama: Margaret Avison, Winter Sun
- Non-Fiction: Frank H. Underhill, In Search of Canadian Liberalism

=== French language ===
- Poetry or Drama: Anne Hébert, Poèmes
- Non-Fiction: Paul Toupin, Souvenirs Pour Demain
