= Paul Chamberland =

Paul Chamberland (born 1939 in Longueuil, Quebec) is a poet and Quebec essayist. He is also considered as a humanist. He studied philosophy and literature. He participated in La Nuit de La poésie in the 27th of March 1970, with Gaston Miron, Claude Péloquin, Raôul Duguay, Michèle Lalonde, etc.

Chamberland was a professor of literature in the University of Québec between 1991 and 2004. He received the Prix de l'essai de la revue Spirale in 2000 for En nouvelle barbarie, and the Victor-Barbeau prize of the Académie des lettres du Québec in 2005 for his last essay for VLB Éditeur, Une politique de la douleur. In 2007, Chamberland received the Prix Athanase-David. He also got recognized for his sovereignist engagement and his pamphleteer texts on the subject.

The archives of Paul Chamberland are kept at the Montreal archives center of Bibliothèque et Archives nationales du Québec.

== Published works ==
- Genèses, 1962 [reedited with Herbes rouges in 1971 et with L'aurore in 1974].
- Le Pays, Librairie Déom editions, 1963.
- Terre Québec, 1964 [reedited with Typo in 2003 under the titleTerre Québec.].
- L'Afficheur hurle, 1965 [reedited first in 1969].
- L'Inavouable, 1967.
- Éclats de la pierre noire d'où rejaillit ma vie. Poèmes suivis d'une révélation (1966-1969), D. Laliberté editions, 1972.
- Demain les dieux naîtront, l'Hexagone editions, 1974.
- Le prince de sexamour, 1976 [reedited in 1991].
- Extrême survivance, extrême poésie, Parti pris editions, 1978.
- Terre souveraine, l'Hexagone editions, 19804.
- L'Enfant doré : 1974-1977, l'Hexagone editions, 1980.
- Le courage de la poésie. Fragments d'art total, Les Herbes rouges editions, 1981.
- Émergence de l'adultenfant : poésies et essais, J. Basile editions, 1981.
- Fidèles d'amour, 1981.
- Du côté hiéroglyphe de ce qu'on appelle le réel.
- Aléatoire instantané, Écrits des Forges, 1983.
- Le Recommencement du monde : méditations sur le processus apocalyptique, Le Préambule editions, 1983.
- Un parti pris anthropologique, Parti pris editions, 1983 [reedited in 1991].
- Compagnons chercheurs, Le Préambule editions, 1984.
- Mise à distance de toute technologie. Conférence, Union of Quebec writers, 1984.
- L'Inceste et le génocide, Le Préambule editions, 1985.
- Phoenix intégral. Poèmes, 1975-1987
- Intarsia, 1990.
- Marcher dans Outremont ou ailleurs, VLB Éditeur, 1990.
- Le multiple événement terrestre. Géogrammes I, l'Hexagone editions, 1991.
- Terre souveraine, l'Hexagone editions, 1991.
- L'enfant doré, l'Hexagone editions, 1991.
- Demi-tour, l'Hexagone editions, 1991.
- Un livre de morale. Essais sur le nihilisme contemporain, l'Hexagone editions, 1991.
- L'assaut contre les vivants. Géogrammes 2, l'Hexagone editions, 1994.
- Témoin nomade, l'Hexagone editions, 1995.
- Dans la proximité des choses, l'Hexagone editions, 1996.
- Le froid coupant du dehors. Géogrammes 3, l'Hexagone editions, 1997.
- Intime faiblesse des mortels, Noroît editions, 1999.
- En nouvelle barbarie, Éditions de l'Hexagone, 1999 [reedited with Typo in 1991, augmented edition in 2006].
- Poésie et politique. Mélanges offerts en hommage à Michel van Schendel, l'Hexagone editions, 2001.
- Au seuil d'une autre terre, Noroît editions, 2003.
- Une politique de la douleur. Pour résister à notre anéantissement, coll. « Le soi et l'autre », VLB Éditeur, 2004.
- Résister ou disparaître, un manifeste, 2007 [Available online: www.resisteroudisparaitre.org].
- Cœur creuset. Carnets 1997-2004, l'Hexagone editions, 2008.
- Comme une seule chair, Noroît editions, 2009.
- Les pantins de la destruction, Poètes de brousse editions, 2012.
- Accueillir la vie nue face à l'extrême qui vient, coll. « Le soi et l'autre », VLB Éditeur, 2015. (ISBN 978-2-89649-485-9)

== Honours ==
- 1964 - Prix Du Maurier
- 1964 - Prix David
- 1999 - Prix de poésie Terrasses Saint-Sulpice
- 2000 - Prix Spirale Eva-Le-Grand
- 2005 - Prix Victor-Barbeau
- 2007 - Prix Athanase-David
- Membre de l'Académie des lettres du Québec
