= Marie-Claire Daveluy =

Canadian librarian, historian and writer

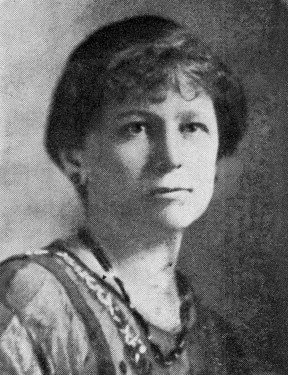
- Born: August 15, 1880; Montreal, Quebec, Canada
- Died: January 21, 1968 (aged 87); Montreal, Quebec, Canada
- Resting place: Notre Dame des Neiges Cemetery
- Occupation: librarian
- Writing career
- Genre: youth historical novel

Marie-Claire Daveluy (August 15, 1880 – January 21, 1968) was a Canadian librarian, historian and writer. She is considered a pioneer in library science in Canada.

== Biography ==
The daughter of Georges Daveluy and Marie Lesieur Desaulniers, she was born in Montreal, Quebec, and was educated at the Hochelaga Convent. She earned a degree in library science at McGill University in 1920. At the Bibliothèque municipale de Montréal, she was assistant librarian from 1920 to 1943 and head of cataloguing from 1930 to 1941. In 1937, with Aegidius Fauteux, she founded the École de bibliothécaires at the Université de Montréal and served as its chair for several years. She also helped found the Association canadienne des bibliothécaires de langue française in 1943. She hosted a weekly program of historical sketches on Radio-Canada from 1943 to 1948. Daveluy contributed articles to various periodicals including the Revue d'histoire de l'Amérique française, La Bonne Parole, L'Oiseau bleu and L'action française. Her novels for youth combined Canadian history with romantic fiction. She also published a number of fairy tales including Le Filleul du roi Grolo, Sur les ailes de l'oiseau bleu and Une Révolte au pays des fées.

She was the first woman to become a member of the Montreal Historical Society. In 1924, she received the Prix David for her historical novel Aventures de Perrine et Charlot. In 1934, she received the Prix de l'Académie Française and a second Prix David for Jeanne-Mance, 1606-1673.

She died in Montreal at the age of 87 and was entombed at the Notre Dame des Neiges Cemetery in Montreal.
