= Clément Marchand =

Canadian writer (1912–2013)

Clément Marchand (12 September 1912 – 22 April 2013) was a Canadian writer, poet and journalist and publisher. He was born in Sainte-Geneviève-de-Batiscan, Quebec.

== Awards ==
- 1939 - Prix Athanase-David
- 1942 - Prix Athanase-David
- 1947 - Member of the Royal Society of Canada
- 1981 - fr:Grand prix littéraire de la Société Saint-Jean-Baptiste de la Mauricie
- 1984 - Member of the Ordre des francophones d'Amérique
- 2000 - Knight of the National Order of Quebec
- Member of the Académie des lettres du Québec
- Member of the Société des écrivains français

== Selected works ==
- Les Soirs rouges (1939)
- Vanishing Villages: Tales from the Countryside (Guernica Editions, Canada, 1992).
