= Victor-Lévy Beaulieu =

Canadian writer (1945–2025)

- Born: September 2, 1945; Saint-Paul-de-la-Croix, Quebec, Canada
- Died: June 9, 2025 (aged 79); Notre-Dame-des-Neiges, Quebec, Canada
- Occupations: Writer, playwright, editor
- Awards: Governor General's Award for French-language fiction (1974); Prix France-Canada (1979); Ludger-Duvernay Prize (1981); Prix Jean-Béraud-Molson (1981)

Victor-Lévy Beaulieu (French pronunciation: [viktɔʁ levi boljø]; September 2, 1945 – June 9, 2025) was a Canadian writer, playwright and editor.

== Life and career ==
Born in Saint-Paul-de-la-Croix, Quebec, in the area of Bas-Saint-Laurent, Beaulieu began primary school at Trois-Pistoles, Quebec, moving later to Montréal-Nord.

He began his public writing career at the Montreal weekly Perspectives, where he served as a columnist for a decade from 1966 to 1976. In 1967, he became a copywriter at La Presse, Petit Journal, Digest Éclair, and finally at Maintenant in 1970.

In 1967, he won the Larousse-Hachette Prize thanks to an eighteen-page essay devoted to Victor Hugo. In 1968, he spent a year in Paris, and on his return became a scriptwriter at the Montreal radio station CKLM while resuming his position of columnist. Also in 1968, he published his first novel Mémoires d'outre-tonneau. This would be the first of a long run: Race de monde (1969), La nuite de Malcomm Hudd (1969, Jos Connaissant (1970), Les Grands Pères (1971), Un rêve québécois (1972), Oh Miami Miami Miami (1973), and Don Quichotte de la démanche (1974).

Beaulieu served as a teacher of literature at the National Theatre School of Canada from 1972 to 1978, and also wrote for the Radio-Canada broadcasts "Documents", "Petit théâtre", "Roman", and "La Feuillaison".

His book, James Joyce, l'Irlande et le Québec, has been praised by critics.

Beaulieu also worked in the field of publishing. During his time at Les Éditions du Jour as literary editor from 1969 to 1973, he hastened to build the collection Répertoire québécois. In 1973, he founded his own publishing house, Les Éditions de l'Aurore, which was followed by VLB éditeur and finally by Éditions Trois-Pistoles.

In 2008, he threatened to burn copies of his entire body of work as a protest against the growth of bilingualism in Quebec and various statements by Parti Québécois leader Pauline Marois in support of English classes for francophone schoolchildren.

Beaulieu created a stir after describing Canadian governor general Michaëlle Jean as a "negro queen" in L'aut'journal magazine. Beaulieu said Jean was appointed to the post because she was "black, young, pretty, ambitious, and because of her husband, certainly a nationalist as well." In an interview with La Presse, Beaulieu defended his text, saying he had not intended to be racist. However, his eight references to the "reine nègre" caught the attention of Bloc Québécois Leader Gilles Duceppe and Bloc MP Vivian Barbot. Barbot told La Presse she found the text insulting and discriminatory, and a personal attack on Jean's character.

Beaulieu wrote of the "small, black queen of Radio-Canada" and her visit to France, where she spoke about Canadian federalism, but also saluted France for its abolition of slavery in 1847. Beaulieu noted Jean, a native of Haiti, came from a country that long suffered the effects of slavery.

Beaulieu died in Notre-Dame-des-Neiges, Quebec, on June 9, 2025, at the age of 79.
