= James MacPherson Le Moine =

Canadian author and barrister

Sir James MacPherson Le Moine
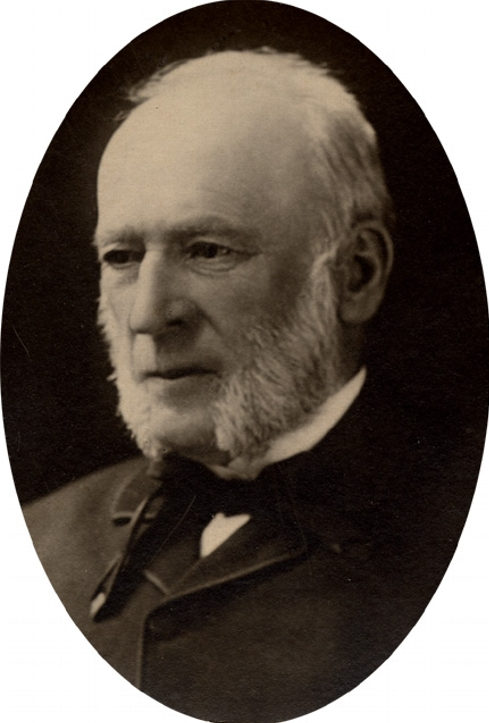
- Born: January 24, 1825; Quebec City, Lower Canada
- Died: February 5, 1912 (aged 87); Spencer Grange, Sillery, Quebec, Canada
- Resting place: Mount Hermon Cemetery, Sillery, Quebec
- Occupations: Author; historian; ornithologist; folklorist; barrister
- Relatives: Benjamin-Henri Le Moine (brother)

Sir James MacPherson Le Moine (24 January 1825 — 5 February 1912) was a Canadian author and barrister.

He was involved with the Literary and Historical Society of Quebec, helping in the development of their natural history museum, and later serving as president in 1871, 1879–1882, and 1902–1903.

From 1894 to 1895, he was the president of the Royal Society of Canada.

In 1897, he was made a Knight by Queen Victoria.

In 1856, he married Mary Atkinson. They had two children: Jeanette Julia and Sophia Annie.

Le Moine was buried on 7 February 1912, at the Protestant Mount Hermon Cemetery, following a funeral service in the Roman Catholic Saint-Michel de Sillery Church, both located in Sillery.

== Selected bibliography ==
- Ornithologie du Canada (1860–1861)
- Maple Leaves (1863–1906)
- Quebec Past and Present (1876)
- Picturesque Quebec (1882)

Professional and academic associations
Preceded by George Mercer Dawson	President of the Royal Society of Canada; 1894–1895	Succeeded by Alfred Richard Cecil Selwyn
