= Gérard Bessette =

Canadian writer

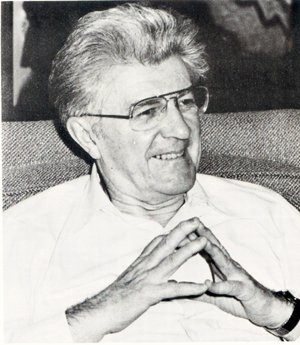
Gérard Bessette

Gérard Bessette (25 February 1920 – 21 February 2005) was a Canadian writer and educator.

== Life and career ==
Bessette was born in Sainte-Anne-de-Sabrevois, Quebec, and grew up in Montreal. He attended the Collège Saint-Ignace. He continued his studies at the Université de Montréal, where in 1950 he completed his doctorate. His doctoral thesis was published in 1960 as Images in French-Canadian Poetry (Les images en poésie canadienne-française).

Unable to obtain an academic position in Quebec because of his atheism, he taught at Duquesne University in Pittsburgh from 1951 to 1957. He then found a job in Kingston, Ontario, first at Royal Military College of Canada in 1958, and then in the Department of French Studies at Queen's University from 1959 to 1979.

== Writing ==
When he was 28, his early poem "Le Coureur" was selected to compete in the "Literature, Lyric Works" subcategory of the art competition at the 1948 Summer Olympics.

Several of Bessette's works address issues that led to and were representative of the Quiet Revolution, a series of societal shifts that took place in Quebec during the 1960s, which saw increased secularization and a general movement away from the influence of the Catholic Church. His literary criticism is noted for its Freudian readings of Quebec literature.

One of his most famous novels is Not for Every Eye (Le Libraire, 1960), an existential tale of a book store employee in a small Quebec town in the 1950s. The book deals with one of Bessette's most common themes: the stifling culture of Quebec of that time.

In the 1960s, he was influenced by the Nouveau Roman literary movement. His novels became increasingly experimental, drawing comparisons to Claude Simon, one of his favourite writers. L'Incubation (1965) and Le Cycle (1971) both won the Governor General's Award for French-language fiction. In 1980, he was awarded the Prix Athanase-David, Quebec's highest literary honour.

He died in Kingston, Ontario, on 21 February 2005.

== Bibliography ==
=== Novels ===
- La Bagarre (1958). The Brawl, trans. Marc Lebel and Ronald Sutherland (Harvest House, 1976)
- Le Libraire (1960). Not for Every Eye, trans. Glen Shortliffe (Macmillan of Canada, 1962); translation later revised by Steven Urquhart (Exile Editions, 2010)
- Les Pédagogues (1961)
- L'Incubation (1965). Incubation, trans. Glen Shortliffe (Macmillan of Canada, 1967)
- Le Cycle (1971). The Cycle, trans. A.D. Martin-Sperry (Exile Editions, 1987)
- La Commensale (1975)
- Les Anthropoïdes (1977)
- Le Semestre (1979)
- Les Dires d'Omer Marin (1985)

=== Essays ===
- Les Images en poésie canadienne-française (1960; 1967)
- Une littérature en ébullition (1968)
- Histoire de la littérature canadienne-française par les textes : des origines à nos jours (edited with Lucien Geslin and Charles Parent, 1968)
- De Québec à Saint-Boniface (editor, 1968)
- Trois romanciers québécois : Victor-Lévy Beaulieu, André Langevin, Gabrielle Roy (1973)
- Mes romans et moi (1979)

=== Other ===
- Poèmes temporels (1954)
- La Garden-party de Christophine (1980, short stories)

== Awards and honours ==
- 1947: Prix du Concours littéraire de la province de Québec for Le coureur et autres poèmes
- 1961: Le Libraire selected by the "Grand Jury des lettres" as one of the 10 best novels of the previous 15 years
- 1965: Governor General's Award for French-language fiction for L'Incubation
- 1965: Prix du Concours littéraire de la province de Québec for L'Incubation
- 1966: Member of the Royal Society of Canada
- 1971: Governor General's Award for French-language fiction for Le Cycle
- 1980: Prix Athanase-David
