= Rina Lasnier =

Canadian poet

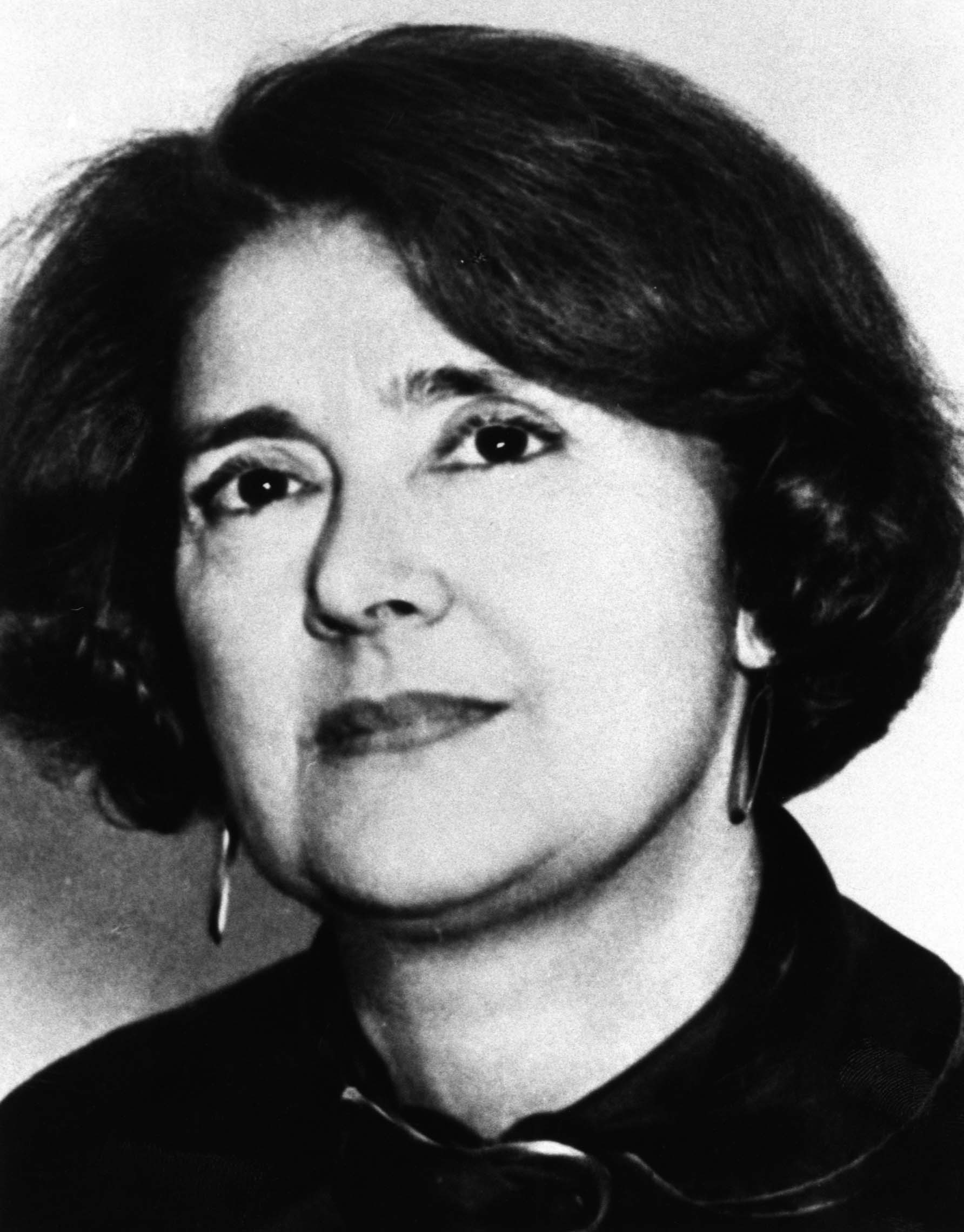
- Born: August 6, 1915; St-Grégoire d'Iberville, Quebec
- Died: May 9, 1997 (aged 81)
- Occupation: Poet

Rina Lasnier, GOQ (6 August 1915 – 9 May 1997) was a Québécois Canadian poet. Born in St-Grégoire d'Iberville-Mont-Saint-Grégoire, Quebec, she attended Collège Marguerite Bourgeoys and the Université de Montréal. Although she was the author of several plays, including Féerie indienne (her first published book in 1939), she is chiefly remembered as a poet.

Lasnier was the recipient of many honours, including the Prix David (1943 and 1974), the Ludger-Duvernay Prize (1957), the Molson Prize (1971), the Prix France-Canada (1973) and the Lorne Pierce Medal (1974). In 1987, she was made a Grand Officer of the National Order of Quebec. She lived most her adult life in Joliette but returned to the St.-Jean-sur-Richelieu during her final years. A former church turned library in Joliette, Quebec was named after her.

== Selected bibliography ==
=== Poetry ===
- Images et proses - 1941
- Madones canadiennes - 1944
- Le Chant de la montée - 1947
- Escales - 1950
- Présence de l'absence - 1956
- Mémoire sans jours - 1960
- Les Gisants - 1963
- L'arbre blanc - 1966
- L'Invisible - 1969
- La Salle des rêves - 1971
- Poèmes (two volumes) - 1972
- Le Rêve du quart jour - 1973
- Amour - 1975
- L'Échelle des anges - 1975
- Les Signes - 1976
- Matin d'oiseaux - 1978
- Paliers de paroles - 1978
- Entendre l'ombre - 1981
- Voir la nuit - 1981

=== Plays ===
- Féerie indienne - 1939
- Le Jeu de la voyagère - 1941
- Les Fiançailles d'Anne de Noüe - 1943
- Notre-Dame du Pain - 1947
