= Saint-Paul-de-la-Croix =

- Municipality
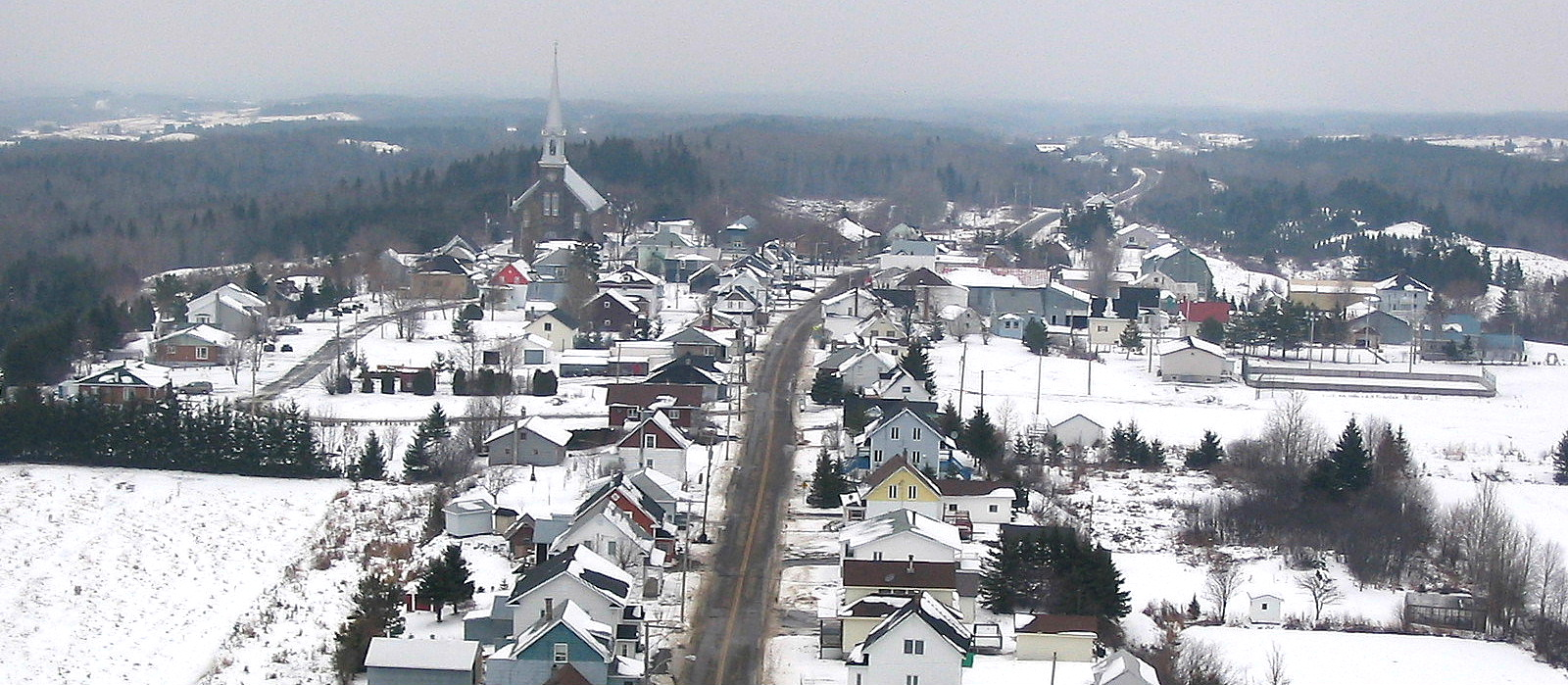

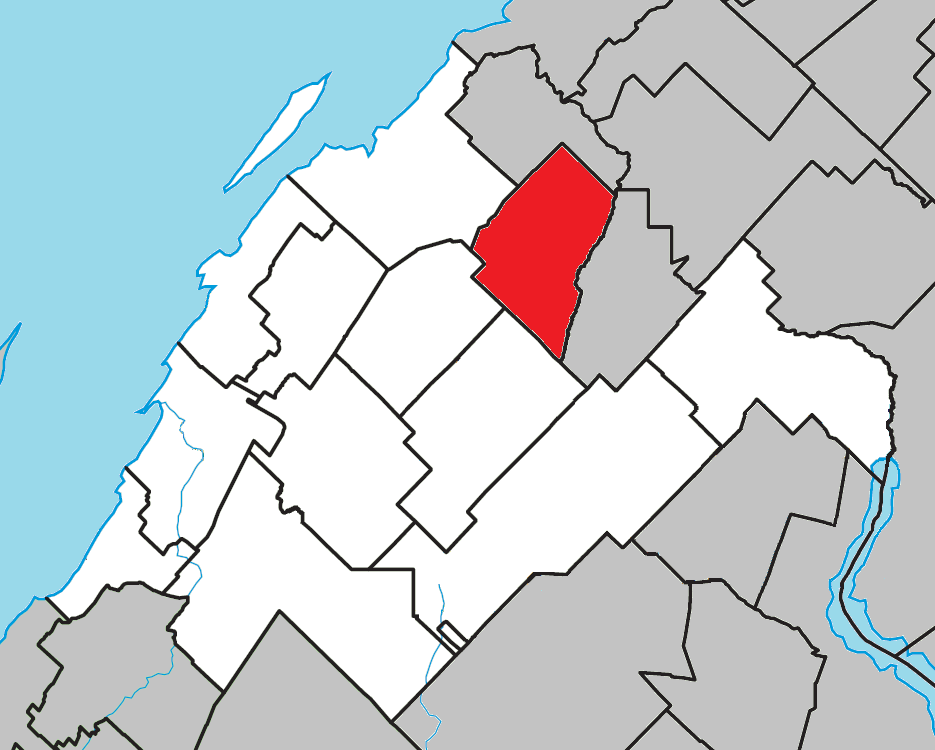
- Location within Rivière-du-Loup RCM

- Location in eastern Quebec
- Coordinates: 47°57′N 69°12′W
- Country: Canada
- Province: Quebec
- Region: Bas-Saint-Laurent
- RCM: Rivière-du-Loup
- Constituted: January 1, 1873

Government
  - Mayor: Elizabeth Lavoie
  - Federal riding: Côte-du-Sud—Rivière-du-Loup—Kataskomiq—Témiscouata
  - Prov. riding: Rivière-du-Loup–Témiscouata–Les Basques

Area
  - Total: 85.90 km^{2} (33.17 sq mi)
  - Land: 78.42 km^{2} (30.28 sq mi)

Population (2021)
  - Total: 313
  - Density: 4/km^{2} (10/sq mi)
  - Pop 2016-2021: ▲1.3%
  - Dwellings: 182
- Time zone: UTC−5 (EST)
  - Summer (DST): UTC−4 (EDT)
- Postal code(s): G0L 3Z0
- Area codes: 418 and 581
- Highways: No major routes
- Website: www.municipalite.saint-paul-de-la-croix.qc.ca

Saint-Paul-de-la-Croix (French pronunciation: [sɛ̃ pɔl də la kʁwa]) is a municipality in Quebec, Canada, in the regional county municipality of Rivière-du-Loup Regional County Municipality and the administrative region of Bas-Saint-Laurent.

In 2021, the status of Saint-Paul-de-la-Croix changed from a parish municipality to a regular municipality.

== See also ==
- List of municipalities in Quebec
