= Léo-Paul Desrosiers =

Canadian writer and journalist (1896–1967)

- Born: April 11, 1896; Berthier-en Haut, Quebec, Canada
- Died: April 20, 1967 (aged 71); Montreal, Quebec
- Occupations: Writer, journalist
- Writing career
- Period: 20th century
- Genre: Historical fiction

Léo-Paul Desrosiers (April 11, 1896 – April 20, 1967) was a Quebec writer and journalist well known for his historical novels. He was influenced by the nationalism of Henri Bourassa and Lionel-Adolphe Groulx.

He published his first novel in 1922 called Âmes et Paysages. His best-known work, Les Engagés du Grand Portage published in 1938, was set in the fur trade-years in the early 19th century. As a journalist he mainly wrote for Le Devoir.

He won the Ludger-Duvernay Prize in 1951 and the Lorne Pierce Medal in 1963.

== Works ==
- Ames Et Paysages, (1922)
- Nord-Sud, (1931)
- Le Livre Des Mystères, (1936)
- L'Accalmie, Lord Durham Au Canada, (1937)
- Les Engagés Du Grand Portage, (1938); The Making Of Nicolas Montour [translated by Christina vol an Ooordt], (1978)
- Commencements, (1939)
- Les Opiniâtres, (1941)
- Sources, (1942)
- Iroquoisie, (1947)
- L'Ampoule D'Or, (1951)
- Les Dialogues De Marthe Et De Marie, (1957)
- Vous Qui Passez, (1958)
- Les Angoisses Et Les Tourments, (1959)
- Rafales Sur Les Cimes, (1960)
- Dans Le Nid D'Aiglons, La Colombe Vie De Jeanne Le Ber..., (1963)
- Paul De Chomedey, Sieur De Maisonneuve, (1967)
