= Luc Lacourcière =

Canadian ethnographer and writer (1910–1989)

Luc Lacourcière, CC (October 18, 1910 – May 15, 1989) was a Québécois writer and ethnographer, who established himself during his lifetime as a leading figure in folklore studies. Trained by Marius Barbeau, he in turn influenced renowned researchers such as linguist Claude Poirier. In 1944, Lacourcière founded the Archives de folklore (AF), which he directed until 1975. Since 1978, a Luc-Lacourcière medal has been awarded every two years.

== Honours received ==
- 1967 - Member of the Society of Ten
- 1969 - Ludger-Duvernay Prize
- 1970 - Companion of the Order of Canada
- 1971 - Killam Fellowship
- 1974 - Canadian Music Council Medal
- 1979 - Marius-Barbeau Medal
- 1985 - Medal of the Académie des lettres du Québec
- 1986 - Member of the Order of Francophones of America
- 1986 - Price of 3-July-1608
