= Robert Charbonneau =

French-Canadian writer

- Born: February 3, 1911; Montreal, Quebec
- Died: June 26, 1967 (aged 56); Saint-Jovite, Quebec
- Resting place: Notre Dame des Neiges Cemetery
- Occupations: Journalist, writer
- Writing career
- Period: 20th century
- Genres: Fiction, essays

Robert Charbonneau (February 3, 1911 – June 26, 1967) was a French-Canadian journalist, writer, and literary critic.

== Biography ==
Charbonneau was born in Montreal. He began his studies at Ecole Saint-Stanislas in 1919 and continued his classical studies at Collège Sainte-Marie in 1925 and graduated with a bachelor's degree in 1933. He studied for a year at the Université de Montréal and graduated as a journalist one year later in 1934.

In 1934, he and Paul Beaulieu created La Relève, a student newspaper, which became La Nouvelle Relève in 1941 and which he directed until 1948. In 1940, he and Claude Hurtubise founded Éditions de l'Arbre, which republished works that were prohibited in occupied France. They also published works by young French-Canadian writers such as Roger Lemelin and Yves Thériault.

In 1949, he returned to his former profession as a journalist and became assistant to the director of information at La Presse. He also worked for other French Journals as well as Radio Canada.

Charbonneau wrote five novels and one book of poetry in his lifetime. He was well known for promoting the autonomy of Quebec literature. In his essay, Connaissance du personnage, he put forth his position that the role of a novel is not to reflect an era or a society but to emphasize man's spiritual quest, his search for identity. Charbonneau is credited with transforming French-Canadian literature from its agrarian roots to a more modern urban outlook.

In 1967 he published his last novel, Chronique de l'âge amer, a semi-autobiographical memoir set in the 1930s. That same year he was made president of the Société des écrivains, but he suffered a fatal heart attack that same year. He was entombed at the Notre Dame des Neiges Cemetery in Montreal.

Charbonneau's archival fonds are kept at the Montreal archives centre of the Bibliothèque et Archives nationales du Québec.

== Works ==
=== Novels ===
- Ils posséderont la terre, Éditions de l'Arbre, Le Serpent d'airain (1941)
- Fontile, Éditions de l'Arbre (1945)
- Les Désirs et les Jours, Éditions de l'Arbre (1948)
- Aucune créature, Éditions Beauchemin (1961)
- Chronique de l'âge amer, Éditions du Sablier (1967)

=== Other publications ===
- Connaissance du personnage, Éditions de l'Arbre (1944)
- Petits poèmes retrouvés, Éditions de l'Arbre (1945)
- La France et nous, Éditions de l'Arbre (1947)
- Robert Charbonneau et la création romanesque, les Éditions du Lévrier (1948)
- Aucun chemin n'est sûr..., XYZ éditeur (1990)
