= Jean-Guy Pilon =

Canadian poet (1930–2021)

- Born: 12 November 1930; Saint-Polycarpe, Quebec
- Died: 27 April 2021 (aged 90)
- Writing career
- Genre: Poetry

Jean-Guy Pilon, OC CQ FRSC (12 November 1930 – 27 April 2021) was a Quebec poet.

Born in Saint-Polycarpe, Quebec, he received a law degree from the Université de Montréal in 1954.

== Honours ==
- In 1967, he was elected a Fellow of the Royal Society of Canada.
- In 1984, he was awarded the Prix Athanase-David.
- In 1987, he was made an Officer of the Order of Canada.
- In 1988, he was made a Knight of the National Order of Quebec.
