= Anne Hébert =

Canadian author and poet (1916–2000)

- Born: August 1, 1916; St. Catherine de Fossambault, Quebec, Canada
- Died: January 22, 2000 (aged 83); Montreal, Quebec, Canada
- Writing career
- Language: French
- Notable works: Les Songes en Équilibre, Poèmes, Kamouraska
- Notable awards: Prix David, Prix Femina, FRSC, Governor General's Award, Order of Canada, Prix Duvernay, Molson Prize

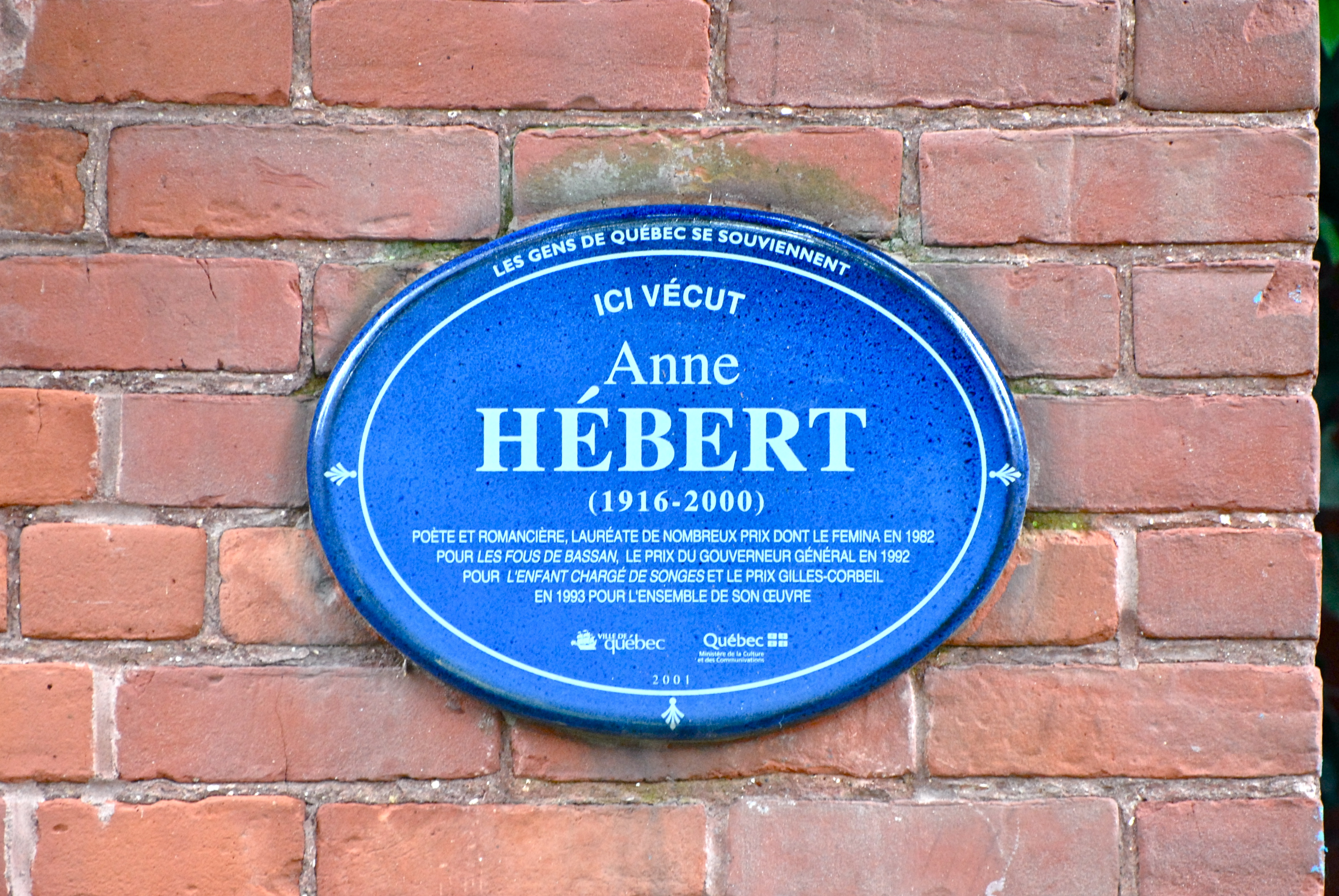
Plaque in memory of Anne Hébert in Quebec

Anne Hébert CC OQ (pronounced [an eˈbɛʁ] in French) (August 1, 1916 – January 22, 2000), was a Canadian author and poet. She won Canada's top literary honor, the Governor General's Award, three times, twice for fiction and once for poetry.

== Early life ==
Hébert was born on August 1, 1916 in Sainte-Catherine-de-Fossambault (name later changed to Sainte-Catherine-de-Portneuf, and in 1984 to Sainte-Catherine-de-la-Jacques-Cartier), Quebec. Her father, Maurice Hébert, was a poet and literary critic. She was a cousin and childhood friend of modernist poet Hector de Saint-Denys Garneau. She began writing poems and stories at a young age.

== Career ==
By the time she was in her early twenties, Hébert's work had been published in a number of periodicals. Her first collection of poems, Les Songes en Équilibre, was published in 1942. In it she writes of herself as existing in solitude in a "dreamlike torpor". It received positive reviews and won her the Prix David.

Saddened by the 1943 death of her thirty-one-year-old cousin, Hector de Saint-Denys Garneau, and by the death of her only sister Marie in 1952, Hébert's poetry became filled with images of death and drowning." No Quebec publisher would publish her 1945 collection of stories, Le Torrent. It was finally published in 1950 at the expense of Roger Lemelin. The provocative tales were considered shocking at the time, but later grew in popularity.

Hébert was affiliated with Canada's first film bureau. She worked for Radio Canada, Film Board of Canada and National Film Board of Canada during the 1950s.

Again, she could not find a publisher for her second book of anguish-filled poetry, Le Tombeau des rois (The Tomb of Kings), and had to publish it at her own expense in 1953. In 1954, Hébert used a grant from the Royal Society of Canada to move to Paris, thinking that the city would be more receptive to her writing.

Les Chambres de bois (1958), her first novel, was a passionate story which depicted violence and brutality through evocative imagery. Hébert was one of the first Québécois writers to experiment in her work with the expression of alienation and rebellion, rather than realistic narration and discussion."

In 1960, during Québec's Quiet Revolution, Hébert published Mystère de la parole, a new collection of poems about more down-to-earth subjects than her previous work.

Hébert's 1970 novel Kamouraska combines two romantic yet suspenseful stories and is set in 19th-century Québec.

Hébert returned to Canada in the 1990s. Her last novel Un Habit de lumière was published in 1998.

Hébert died of bone cancer on January 22, 2000, in Montreal.

== Recognition ==
Hébert's first book of poetry, Les Songes en Équilibre, won Quebec's Prix David. She won the Prix France-Canada and the Ludger-Duvernay Prize in 1958 for Les chambres de bois.

Hébert was elected a Fellow of the Royal Society of Canada in 1960.

Her Poèmes (a reprinting of Le Tombeau des rois, coupled with a section of new poems, Mystère de la parole) won the Governor General's Award for poetry in 1960. She twice won the Governor General's Award for fiction, for her novels Les enfants du sabbat (1975) and L'enfant chargé des songes (1992).

She won the Molson Prize in 1967.

Hébert won France's Prix de librairies for her 1970 novel Kamouraska and its Prix Femina for her 1982 novel Les fous de Bassan. Both books have also been made into movies, Kamouraska in 1973 directed by Claude Jutra, and Les fous de Bassan in 1986 by Yves Simoneau. Kamouraska also won the Grand Prix of the Académie royale de la langue françaises de Belgique.

Hébert's work has been translated into at least seven languages, including English, German, Italian, Japanese, and Spanish. The First Garden, the English translation of Le premier jardin, won the Félix Antoine-Savard Prize for Translation in 1991,

L'école Anne-Hébert, opened in Vancouver in 1983, is an elementary school that offers instruction from kindergarten through grade 6 in French only.

In 2013, documentary filmmaker Michel Langlois released Anne des vingt jours, a biographical documentary about Hébert.

=== Commemorative postage stamp ===
On September 8, 2003, to commemorate the 50th anniversary of the National Library of Canada, Canada Post released a special commemorative series, "The Writers of Canada", with a design by Katalina Kovats, featuring two English-Canadian and two French-Canadian stamps. Three million stamps were issued. The two French-Canadian authors used were Hébert and her cousin, Hector de Saint-Denys Garneau.

== Publications ==
=== Novels ===
- Les chambres de bois. (Paris: Éditions du Seuil, 1958), ISBN 2-02-008805-3 – The Silent Rooms (1974, translated by Kathy Mezei)
- Kamouraska (Paris: Éditions du Seuil, 1970.), ISBN 2-02-031429-0 – Kamouraska (1974, translated by Norman Shapiro)
- Les enfants du sabbat. (Paris: Éditions du Seuil, 1975), ISBN 2-02-006564-9 – Children of the Black Sabbath (1977, translated by Carol Dunlop-Hébert)
- Heloise (Paris: Éditions du Seuil, 1980.), ISBN 2-02-005462-0 –
- Les fous de Bassan – (Paris: Editions du Seuil, 1982.), ISBN 2-02-006243-7 – In the Shadow of the Wind (Toronto: Anansi, 1983; translated by Sheila Fischman)
- Le premier jardin. (Paris: Seuil, 1988.), ISBN 2-02-009974-8 – The First Garden (Toronto: Anansi, 1991; translated by Sheila Fischman)
- L'enfant chargé de songes. (Paris : Editions du Seuil, 1992), ISBN 2-02-015374-2 – The Burden of Dreams (Toronto: Anansi, 1994; translated by Sheila Fischman)
- Est-ce que je te dérange?) – (1998) – Am I disturbing you? (Anansi, 1999; translated by Sheila Fischman)
- Un habit de lumière. (Paris : Editions du Seuil, 1999.), ISBN 2-02-036742-4 – A Suit of Light. (Toronto: Anansi, 2000, translated by Sheila Fischman)
- Collected Later Novels. (Toronto: Anansi, 2003, translated by Sheila Fischman), ISBN 0-88784-671-8

=== Poetry ===
- Les songes en equilibre – (1942)
- Le tombeau des rois (The Tomb of the Kings) – (1953)
- Poèmes (Poems) – (1960) – Poems by Anne Hébert (Don Mills, ON: Musson Book Co., 1975, translated by Alan Brown)., ISBN 0-7737-1007-8
- Selected Poems – (1987) – Selected Poems (1987)
- Le jour n'a d'égal que la nuit (Québec : Boréal, [1992]), ISBN 2-89052-519-8 Day Has No Equal But the Night (Toronto: Anansi, 1997; translated by Lola Lemire Tostevin)
- Oeuvre poétique. (1993) Quebec: Boreal, ISBN 2-89052-520-1
- Poèmes pour la main gauche – ([Montréal]: Boréal, [1997]), ISBN 2-89052-823-5

=== Short stories and novellas ===
- Le torrent. (1950), ISBN 2-89406-033-5 – The Torrent (1973, translated by Gwendolyn Moore)
- Aurélien, Clara, Mademoiselle et le Lieutenant anglais. (1995) ISBN 2-02-023670-2 Aurélien, Clara, Mademoiselle, and the English Lieutenant (Toronto: Anansi, 1996; translated by Sheila Fischman)
- Est-ce que je te dérange? (Paris : Editions du Seuil, 1998), ISBN 2-02-032310-9 – Am I Disturbing You? (Toronto: Anansi, 1999; translated by Sheila Fischman)

=== Theater ===
- La Mercière assassinée – (The Murdered Shopkeeper, translated by Eugene Benson and Renate Benson, Canadian Drama/L'Art dramatique Canadien, vol. 10, no.2 (1984).)
- Le temps sauvage – (1956) – (The Unquiet State, translated by Eugene Benson and Renate Benson, Canadian Drama/L'Art dramatique Canadien, vol. 14, no. 2 (1988).)
- Les Invités au Procès – (The Guests on Trial, translated by Eugene Benson and Renate Benson, Canadian Drama/L'Art dramatique Canadien, vol. 9, no.1 (1983).)
- La cage suivi de L'île de la demoiselle – (1990) – (The Cage and L'Île de la demoiselle, translated by Pamela Grant, Gregory J. Reid, and Sheila Fischman, (2010).)

=== Film scripts ===
- L'Éclusier (Lock-keeper) – (1953)
- The Charwoman – (1954)
- Midinette (Needles and Pins) – (1955)
- La Canne à pêche – (1959)
- Saint-Denys Garneau – (1960)
- L'Étudiant – (1961)
- Kamouraska – (1973)
- Les Fous de Bassan – (1987)
