= Jacques Brault =

French Canadian poet and translator (1933–2022)

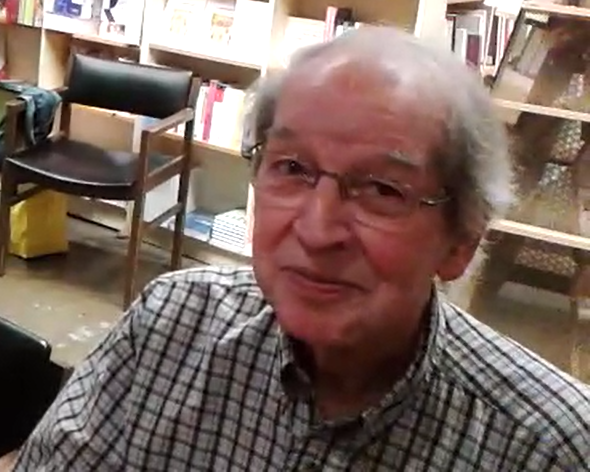
- Born: 29 March 1933
- Died: 20 October 2022 (aged 89)
- Occupations: poet and translator
- Awards: Governor General's Award; Prix Alain-Grandbois; Ludger-Duvernay Prize; Prix Athanase-David

Academic background
- Education: Université de Montréal; Sorbonne

Academic work
- Institutions: Université de Montréal
- Notable works: Mémoire

Jacques Brault (29 March 1933 – 20 October 2022) was a French Canadian poet and translator who lived in Cowansville, Quebec, Canada. He was born to a poor family, but received an education at the Université de Montréal and at the Sorbonne in Paris. He became a professor at the Université de Montréal, in the Département d'études françaises and the Institut des sciences médiévales, and made frequent appearances as a cultural commentator on Radio-Canada.

Jacques Brault's writings include plays, novels and works of short fiction, translations and several works of Canadian literary criticism. However, it is primarily for his work as a poet that Jacques Brault is known outside of Canada.

Brault died on 20 October 2022, at the age of 89.

== Works ==
- Mémoire – 1965
- Allain Grandbois: poètes d'aujourd'hui — 1968
- La poésie ce matin — 1971
- Trois partitions — 1972
- L'en dessous l'admirable — 1975 (translated into English as Within the Mystery)
- Poèmes des quatre côtes — 1975
- Agonie — 1984
- Moments fragiles — 1984 (translated into English as Fragile Moments)
- Poèmes — 1986
- La poussière du chemin — 1989
- Il n'y a plus de chemin — 1990 (translated into English as On the Road No More)
- Lac noire
- Ô saisons, ô châteaux — 1991
- Au petit matin — 1993
- Chemin faisan — 1995
- Au fonds du jardin — accompagnements — 1996
- Au bras des ombres — 1997

== Accolades ==
- Québec-Paris award, for Mé, in 1968
- Governor General's Award
  - for Quand nous serons heureux, in 1970
  - for Agonie, in 1985
  - for his translation of the collection of poems Transfiguration by E. D. Blodgett, in 1999
- Prix Alain-Grandbois, for Il n'y a plus de chemin, in 1991
- Ludger-Duvernay Prize (1978)
- Prix Athanase-David (1986)
- Prix Gilles-Corbeil (1996)

== See also ==
- List of French Canadian writers
- List of Quebec authors
