= Victor Barbeau =

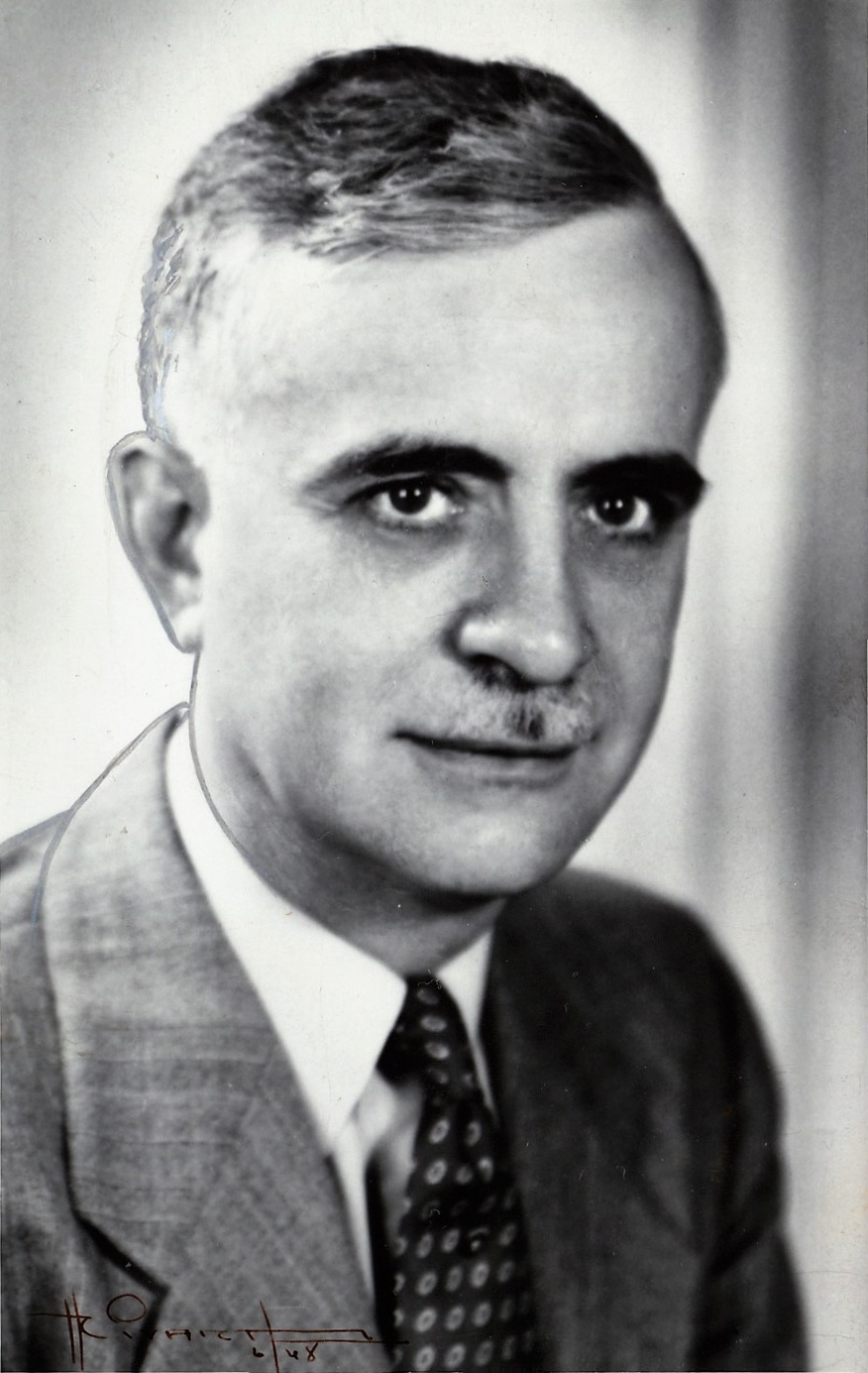
- Born: 18 August 1894; Montreal, Quebec
- Died: 19 July 1994 (aged 99)
- Resting place: Notre Dame des Neiges Cemetery
- Occupations: writer and academic

Victor Barbeau, OC GOQ (18 August 1894 – 19 July 1994) was a Quebec writer and academic.

Born in Montreal, Quebec, Barbeau was educated at Collège Sainte-Marie, Université Laval, and University of Paris. From 1925 to 1963, he was a professor at HEC Montréal.

He was a founding member of the Académie canadienne française (today Académie des lettres du Québec) and was its president from 1944 to 1947.

In 1970, he was made an Officer of the Order of Canada. In 1987, he was made a Grand Officer of the National Order of Quebec. After his death in 1994, he was entombed at the Notre Dame des Neiges Cemetery in Montreal.
