= Robert Choquette =

Canadian novelist, poet and diplomat

Robert Guy Choquette CC GOQ
- Born: April 22, 1905; Manchester, New Hampshire, US
- Died: January 22, 1991 (aged 85); Montreal, Quebec, Canada
- Resting place: Notre Dame des Neiges Cemetery
- Writing career
- Genres: Poetry, Novels, Plays
- Notable awards: Order of Canada; National Order of Quebec

Robert Guy Choquette CC GOQ (French pronunciation: [ʁɔbɛʁ ɡi ʃɔkɛt]; April 22, 1905 – January 22, 1991) was a Canadian novelist, poet and diplomat.

He was born in Manchester, New Hampshire, and he moved with his family to Montreal in 1914.

In 1968, he was appointed Canada's ambassador to Paraguay, Uruguay, and Argentina. He served until 1970.

In 1968, he was made a Companion of the Order of Canada. In 1989, he was made a Grand Officer of the National Order of Quebec.

After his death in 1991, he was entombed at the Notre Dame des Neiges Cemetery in Montreal.

== Bibliography ==
- À travers les vents (1925; “Through the Winds”)-poetry
- La Pension Leblanc (1927)-novel
- Metropolitan Museum (1930)-poetry
- Poésies nouvelles (1933)
- La Fabuliste La Fontaine a Montreal (1935; "The Fabulist La Fontaine in Montreal")
- Le Cure de village (1936; "The Village Curate")-novel
- Les Velder (1941)-novel
- Suite Marine: Poeme en Douze Chants (1953)-poetry
- Oeuvres poétiques (1956; "Poetic Works")-poetry
- Language And Religion: A History of English-french Conflict in Ontario (1975)
- Le sorcier d'Anticosti et autres légendes canadiennes
- Moi, Pétrouchka: Souvenir d'une chatte de vingt-deux ans (1980)
