= ReLit Awards =

Annual Canadian literary prize

The ReLit Awards are Canadian literary prizes awarded annually to book-length works in the novel, short-story and poetry categories. They were founded in 2000 by Newfoundland filmmaker and author Kenneth J. Harvey.

Subtitled Ideas, Not Money, the main title of the awards is short for 'Regarding Literature, Reinventing Literature, and Relighting Literature.' The awards were conceived by Harvey as an alternative to larger mainstream prizes such as the Giller Prize and the Governor General's Awards. There is no money awarded for the prize; in the first two years, the winners received a nominal prize of one Canadian dollar. Since 2003 the recipients have been presented with a silver ring designed by Newfoundland artisan Christopher Kearney, featuring four inlaid movable dials engraved with all of the letters of the alphabet.

The award was known for its use of what were commonly called "very longlists" or "long shortlists", with no limit on the number of works that could be nominated in a given year and no followup winnowing of the nominees into a shorter list of finalists.

The award went on hiatus in the late 2010s, with no shortlists or winners announced for 2018, 2019 or 2020.

It was announced in January 2021 that management of the award had been taken over by Harvey's daughter Katherine Alexandra Harvey. The project expanded to incorporate an online literary journal and a mentorship program for young writers. In April 2021, the shortlists and winners for all of the hiatus years were announced throughout the month.

In September 2023, Harvey announced that the awards would go on hiatus after that year's announcements, due to funding difficulties.

== Nominees and winners ==
=== Novel ===
ReLit Award for Novel winners and shortlists
| Year | Author(s) | Title | Result | Ref. |
|---|---|---|---|---|
| 2001 | Bonnie Bowman | Skin | Winner | |
| 2001 | Bill Gaston | The Good Body | Nominee | |
| 2001 | Lydia Kwa | This Place Called Absence | Nominee | |
| 2001 | Ralph Osborne | Just for Comfort | Nominee | |
| 2001 | Stan Rogal | Bafflegab | Nominee | |
| 2001 | Cordelia Strube | The Barking Dog | Nominee | |
| 2002 | Jonathan Goldstein | Lenny Bruce Is Dead | Winner | |
| 2003 | Peter Darbyshire | Please | Winner | |
| 2003 | France Daigle | A Fine Passage | Nominee | |
| 2003 | Mary Swan | The Deep | Nominee | |
| 2003 | Guillaume Vigneault | Necessary Betrayals | Nominee | |
| 2004 | Darren Greer | Still Life With June | Winner | |
| 2004 | Kim Brunhuber | Kameleon Man | Nominee | |
| 2004 | David Homel | The Speaking Cure | Nominee | |
| 2004 | Kent Nussey | A Love Supreme | Nominee | |
| 2005 | Sky Gilbert | An English Gentleman | Winner | |
| 2005 | Natalee Caple | Mackerel Sky | Nominee | |
| 2005 | Bill Gaston | Sointula | Nominee | |
| 2005 | Cordelia Strube | Blind Night | Nominee | |
| 2006 | Lisa Moore | Alligator | Winner | |
| 2006 | Jim Christy | The Redemption of Anna Dupree | Nominee | |
| 2006 | David Gilmour | A Perfect Night to Go to China | Nominee | |
| 2006 | Gaétan Soucy | The Immaculate Conception | Nominee | |
| 2007 | Ivan E. Coyote | Bow Grip | Winner | |
| 2007 | Andy Brown | The Mole Chronicles | Nominee | |
| 2007 | Chris Ewart | Miss Lamp | Nominee | |
| 2007 | Rawi Hage | De Niro's Game | Nominee | |
| 2007 | George K. Ilsley | ManBug | Nominee | |
| 2007 | Sean Johnston | All This Town Remembers | Nominee | |
| 2007 | Marie Hélène Poitras | Suddenly the Minotaur | Nominee | |
| 2007 | Rob Ritchie | Orphans of Winter | Nominee | |
| 2007 | Sylvia Maultash Warsh | Season of Iron | Nominee | |
| 2008 | Gil Adamson | The Outlander | Winner | |
| 2008 | Nadia Bozak | Orphan Love | Nominee | |
| 2008 | David Chariandy | Soucouyant | Nominee | |
| 2008 | Curtis Gillespie | Crown Shyness | Nominee | |
| 2008 | Claire Mulligan | The Reckoning of Boston Jim | Nominee | |
| 2008 | Brian Tucker | Big White Knuckles | Nominee | |
| 2008 | Andrew Wedderburn | The Milk Chicken Bomb | Nominee | |
| 2009 | Michael Blouin | Chase & Haven | Winner | |
| 2009 | Theanna Bischoff | Cleavage | Nominee | |
| 2009 | Daniel Allen Cox | Shuck | Nominee | |
| 2009 | Brian Dedora | A Slice of Voice at the Edge of Hearing | Nominee | |
| 2009 | Maggie Helwig | Girls Fall Down | Nominee | |
| 2009 | Harold Johnson | Charlie Muskrat | Nominee | |
| 2009 | David Manicom | Anna's Shadow | Nominee | |
| 2010 | Michael Kenyon | The Beautiful Children | Winner | |
| 2010 | Joey Comeau | Overqualified | Nominee | |
| 2010 | Christiane Frenette | After the Red Night | Nominee | |
| 2010 | Jason Hrivnak | The Plight House | Nominee | |
| 2010 | Nathaniel G. Moore | Wrong Bar | Nominee | |
| 2010 | Chad Pelley | Away From Everywhere | Nominee | |
| 2010 | Zoe Whittall | Holding Still for As Long As Possible | Nominee | |
| 2011 | Craig Francis Power | Blood Relatives | Winner | |
| 2011 | Evie Christie | The Bourgeois Empire | Nominee | |
| 2011 | Joey Comeau | One Bloody Thing After Another | Nominee | |
| 2011 | Daniel Allen Cox | Krakow Melt | Nominee | |
| 2011 | Jerrod Edson | The Goon | Nominee | |
| 2011 | Jason Heroux | Good Evening, Central Laundromat | Nominee | |
| 2011 | Christian McPherson | The Cube People | Nominee | |
| 2011 | Kathy Page | The Find | Nominee | |
| 2011 | Ken Sparling | Book | Nominee | |
| 2011 | Steve Weiner | Sweet England | Nominee | |
| 2012 | Suzette Mayr | Monoceros | Winner | |
| 2012 | Edem Awumey | Dirty Feet | Nominee | |
| 2012 | Rob Benvie | Maintenance | Nominee | |
| 2012 | Catherine Black | Prick | Nominee | |
| 2012 | Pan Bouyoucas | The Tattoo | Nominee | |
| 2012 | Tony Burgess | Idaho Winter | Nominee | |
| 2012 | R. D. Cain | Cherry Beach Express | Nominee | |
| 2012 | Dani Couture | Algoma | Nominee | |
| 2012 | Richard Cumyn | Constance, Across | Nominee | |
| 2012 | Farzana Doctor | Six Metres of Pavement | Nominee | |
| 2012 | Loren Edizel | Adrift | Nominee | |
| 2012 | Betty Jean Hegerat | The Boy | Nominee | |
| 2012 | Ashley Little | Prick | Nominee | |
| 2012 | Nicole Lundrigan | Glass Boys | Nominee | |
| 2012 | Robert W. Mackay | Soldier of the Horse | Nominee | |
| 2012 | Catherine Mavrikakis | Flowers of Spit | Nominee | |
| 2012 | Arley McNeney | The Time We All Went Marching | Nominee | |
| 2012 | Michael Mirolla | The Ballad of Martin B. | Nominee | |
| 2012 | Michael Murphy | Description of the Blazing World | Nominee | |
| 2012 | Rosemary Nixon | Kalila | Nominee | |
| 2012 | B. W. Powe | These Shadows Remain | Nominee | |
| 2012 | Jan Rehner | Missing Matisse | Nominee | |
| 2012 | Tom Reynolds | Break Me | Nominee | |
| 2012 | Edward Riche | Easy to Like | Nominee | |
| 2012 | Leo Brent Robillard | Drift | Nominee | |
| 2012 | Stan Rogal | Bloodline | Nominee | |
| 2012 | Stuart Ross | Snowball, Dragonfly, Jew | Nominee | |
| 2012 | Marko Sijan | Mongrel | Nominee | |
| 2012 | Ken Sparling | Intention/Implication/Wind | Nominee | |
| 2012 | Charles Tidler | Hard Hed | Nominee | |
| 2012 | Morgan Wade | The Last Stoic | Nominee | |
| 2013 | Lynn Crosbie | Life Is About Losing Everything | Winner | |
| 2013 | Tamara Faith Berger | Maidenhead | Nominee | |
| 2013 | Kayt Burgess | Heidegger Stairwell | Nominee | |
| 2013 | Joey Comeau | Lockpick Pornography | Nominee | |
| 2013 | Claudio Gaudio | Texas | Nominee | |
| 2013 | Annette Lapointe | Whitetail Shooting Gallery | Nominee | |
| 2013 | Keir Lowther | Dirty Bird | Nominee | |
| 2013 | Stephen Marche | Love and the Mess We're In | Nominee | |
| 2013 | James Marshall | Ninja Versus Pirate Featuring Zombies | Nominee | |
| 2013 | Garry Thomas Morse | Minor Episodes Major Ruckus | Nominee | |
| 2013 | Susan Musgrave | Given | Nominee | |
| 2013 | Basil Papademos | Mount Royal | Nominee | |
| 2013 | Corey Redekop | Husk | Nominee | |
| 2013 | Barry Webster | The Lava in My Bones | Nominee | |
| 2014 | Nathaniel G. Moore | Savage 1986-2011 | Winner | |
| 2014 | Jeff Beamish | Sneaker Wave | Nominee | |
| 2014 | Paul Bowdring | The Strangers' Gallery | Nominee | |
| 2014 | Stephanie Domet | Fallsy Downsies | Nominee | |
| 2014 | Susan Downe | Juanita Wildrose, My True Life | Nominee | |
| 2014 | Stacey May Fowles | Infidelity | Nominee | |
| 2014 | Joel Thomas Hynes | Say Nothing Saw Wood | Nominee | |
| 2014 | Shane Joseph | Paradise Revisited | Nominee | |
| 2014 | Amanda Leduc | The Miracle of Ordinary Men | Nominee | |
| 2014 | Ashley Little | Anatomy of a Girl Gang | Nominee | |
| 2014 | Lisa Moore | Caught | Nominee | |
| 2014 | Garry Thomas Morse | Rogue Cells/ Carbon Harbour | Nominee | |
| 2014 | Chad Pelley | Every Little Thing | Nominee | |
| 2014 | Ursula Pflug | The Alphabet Stones | Nominee | |
| 2014 | Christine Walde | Burning from the Inside | Nominee | |
| 2015 | Andrew Kaufman | The Tiny Wife | Winner | |
| 2015 | Nelly Arcan | Hysteric | Nominee | |
| 2015 | Jackie Bateman | Savour | Nominee | |
| 2015 | Elizabeth Copeland | Jazz | Nominee | |
| 2015 | Jesse Gilmour | The Green Hotel | Nominee | |
| 2015 | Beth Goobie | The First Principles of Dreaming | Nominee | |
| 2015 | Darren Greer | Just Beneath My Skin | Nominee | |
| 2015 | Bertrand Laverdure | Universal Bureau of Copyrights | Nominee | |
| 2015 | Lee Maracle | Celia's Song | Nominee | |
| 2015 | Wendy McGrath | North East | Nominee | |
| 2015 | Christine Miscione | Carafola | Nominee | |
| 2015 | Guillaume Morissette | New Tab | Nominee | |
| 2015 | Ursula Pflug and Dyment | Motion Sickness | Nominee | |
| 2015 | Alisha Piercy | Bunny and Shark | Nominee | |
| 2015 | Lisa Pike | My Grandmother's Pill | Nominee | |
| 2015 | Ken Rivard | Motherwild | Nominee | |
| 2015 | Chelsea Rooney | Pedal | Nominee | |
| 2015 | Margaret Sweatman | Mr. Jones | Nominee | |
| 2015 | Wayne Tefs | Barker | Nominee | |
| 2015 | Russell Wangersky | Walt | Nominee | |
| 2015 | Jacob Wren | Polyamorous Love Song | Nominee | |
| 2016 | Carellin Brooks | One Hundred Days of Rain | Winner | |
| 2016 | Michel Basilières | A Free Man | Nominee | |
| 2016 | Danila Botha | Too Much on the Inside | Nominee | |
| 2016 | Matt Cahill | The Society of Experience | Nominee | |
| 2016 | Libby Creelman | Split | Nominee | |
| 2016 | Lynn Crosbie | Where Did You Sleep Last Night | Nominee | |
| 2016 | Pauline Holdstock | The Hunter and the Wild Girl | Nominee | |
| 2016 | Robert Hough | The Man Who Saved Henry Morgan | Nominee | |
| 2016 | Alexis von Konigslow | The Capacity for Infinite Happiness | Nominee | |
| 2016 | Nic Labriola | Winnie's Tongue | Nominee | |
| 2016 | Anakana Schofield | Martin John | Nominee | |
| 2016 | Adam Lewis Schroeder | All-Day Breakfast | Nominee | |
| 2016 | Jon Chan Simpson | Chinkstar | Nominee | |
| 2016 | Elizabeth Ukrainetz | The Theory of Light at Midnight | Nominee | |
| 2016 | Patrick Warner | One Hit Wonders | Nominee | |
| 2016 | Paul Yee | A Superior Man | Nominee | |
| 2017 | Kyp Harness | Wigford Rememberies | Winner | |
| 2017 | Mike Barnes | The Adjustment League | Nominee | |
| 2017 | Paul Bowdring | Mister Nightingale | Nominee | |
| 2017 | David Clerson | Brothers | Nominee | |
| 2017 | Sanita Fejzic | Psychomachia | Nominee | |
| 2017 | Christian Guay-Poliquin | Running on Fumes | Nominee | |
| 2017 | Michelle Butler Hallett | This Marlowe | Nominee | |
| 2017 | Jane Eaton Hamilton | Weekend | Nominee | |
| 2017 | Jack Hannan | The Poet is a Radio | Nominee | |
| 2017 | Terry Jordan | Been in the Storm So Long | Nominee | |
| 2017 | Pierre-Luc Landry | Listening for Jupiter | Nominee | |
| 2017 | Ashley Little | Niagara Motel | Nominee | |
| 2017 | Lydia Perovic | All That Sang | Nominee | |
| 2017 | Eric Plamondon | Hungary-Hollywood Express | Nominee | |
| 2017 | Daniel Poliquin | The Angel’s Jig | Nominee | |
| 2017 | Adam Pottle | The Bus | Nominee | |
| 2017 | Jacques Poulin | English Is Not a Magic Language | Nominee | |
| 2017 | Craig Francis Power | The Hope | Nominee | |
| 2017 | Edward Riche | Today I Learned It Was You | Nominee | |
| 2017 | Leon Rooke | Fabulous Fictions & Peculiar Practices | Nominee | |
| 2017 | Laura Swart | Blackbird Calling | Nominee | |
| 2017 | Jamie Tennant | The Captain of Kinnoull Hill | Nominee | |
| 2017 | Zoe Whittall | The Best Kind of People | Nominee | |
| 2017 | Jared Young | Into the Current | Nominee | |
| 2018 | Martin West | Long Ride Yellow | Winner | |
| 2018 | Michelle Berry | The Prisoner and the Chaplain | Nominee | |
| 2018 | Kristyn Dunnion | Tarry This Night | Nominee | |
| 2018 | Marty Elkins | Leave Us in Peace | Nominee | |
| 2018 | Jamie Fitzpatrick | The End of Music | Nominee | |
| 2018 | Jon R. Flieger | You Are Among Monsters | Nominee | |
| 2018 | Kevin Hardcastle | In the Cage | Nominee | |
| 2018 | Andrew Kaufman | Small Claims | Nominee | |
| 2018 | Marc Labriola | Dying Behaviour of Cats | Nominee | |
| 2018 | Stacey Madden | Touching Strangers | Nominee | |
| 2018 | Stephen Michell | Only the Devil Is Here | Nominee | |
| 2018 | Craig Francis Power | Skeet Love | Nominee | |
| 2018 | Charles Quimper | In Every Wave | Nominee | |
| 2018 | Greg Rhyno | To Me You Seem Giant | Nominee | |
| 2019 | Andrew Battershill | Marry, Bang, Kill | Winner | |
| 2019 | Tamara Faith Berger | Queen Solomon | Nominee | |
| 2019 | Alex Boyd | Army of the Brave and Accidental | Nominee | |
| 2019 | Grant Buday | Atomic Road | Nominee | |
| 2019 | Anne-Renee Caille | The Embalmer | Nominee | |
| 2019 | Louise Carson | In Which | Nominee | |
| 2019 | Julie Demers | Little Beast | Nominee | |
| 2019 | Kyp Harness | The Abandoned | Nominee | |
| 2019 | Jason Heroux | Amusement Park of Constant Sorrow | Nominee | |
| 2019 | John Jantunen | No Quarter | Nominee | |
| 2019 | Fran Kimmel | No Good Asking | Nominee | |
| 2019 | Devin Krukoff | Hummingbird | Nominee | |
| 2019 | Rabindranath Maharaj | Adjacentland | Nominee | |
| 2019 | Keith Maillard | Twin Studies | Nominee | |
| 2019 | Maureen Medved | Black Star | Nominee | |
| 2019 | Pamela Mulloy | The Deserters | Nominee | |
| 2019 | Dean Serravalle | Chameleon | Nominee | |
| 2020 | Michael Blouin | Skin House | Winner | |
| 2020 | Becky Blake | Proof I Was Here | Nominee | |
| 2020 | Jaime Burnet | Crocuses Hatch from Snow | Nominee | |
| 2020 | Nancy Jo Cullen | The Western Alienation Merit Badge | Nominee | |
| 2020 | Andrea Gunraj | The Lost Sisters | Nominee | |
| 2020 | Andrew Kaufman | The Ticking Heart | Nominee | |
| 2020 | Adnan Khan | There Has to Be a Knife | Nominee | |
| 2020 | Sarah Xerar Murphy | Itzel I: A Tlatelolco Awakening | Nominee | |
| 2020 | Heather Nolan | This Is Agatha Falling | Nominee | |
| 2020 | Alix Ohlin | Dual Citizens | Nominee | |
| 2020 | Antanas Sileika | Provisionally Yours | Nominee | |
| 2020 | Amy Spurway | Crow | Nominee | |
| 2020 | Leslie Vryenhoek | We All Will Be Received | Nominee | |
| 2021 | Susan Sanford Blades | Fake It So Real | Winner | |
| 2021 | Katie Bickell | Always Brave | Nominee | |
| 2021 | Eva Crocker | All I Ask | Nominee | |
| 2021 | Su Croll | Seeing Martin | Nominee | |
| 2021 | Francesca Ekwuyasi | Butter Honey Pig Bread | Nominee | |
| 2021 | Deborah Hemming | Throw Down Your Shadows | Nominee | |
| 2021 | Morgan Murray | Dirty Birds | Nominee | |
| 2021 | Lisa Robertson | The Baudelaire Fractal | Nominee | |
| 2021 | Ed Seaward | Fair | Nominee | |
| 2021 | Leanne Betasamosake Simpson | Noopiming | Nominee | |
| 2021 | Eddy Boudel Tan | After Elias | Nominee | |
| 2021 | Christine Vadnais | Fauna | Nominee | |
| 2022 | Conor Kerr | Avenue of Champions | Winner | |
| 2022 | Renée Belliveau | The Sound of Fire | Nominee | |
| 2022 | MP Boisvert | The Fifth: A Love(s) Story | Nominee | |
| 2022 | Randy Boyagoda | Dante's Indiana | Nominee | |
| 2022 | Nic Brewer | Suture | Nominee | |
| 2022 | Beth Follett | Instructor | Nominee | |
| 2022 | Tara Gereaux | Saltus | Nominee | |
| 2022 | Sky Gilbert | I, Gloria Grahame | Nominee | |
| 2022 | Rahela Nayebzadah | Monster Child | Nominee | |
| 2022 | John Passfield | Saturday Morning | Nominee | |
| 2022 | Richard Scarsbrook | The Troupers | Nominee | |
| 2022 | Aimee Wall | We, Jane | Nominee | |
| 2022 | Andrew Wedderburn | The Crash Palace | Nominee | |
| 2023 | Kevin Lambert | Querelle of Roberval | Winner | |
| 2023 | Jowita Bydlowska | Possessed | Nominee | |
| 2023 | K.R. Byggdin | Wonder World | Nominee | |
| 2023 | Terry Doyle | The Wards | Nominee | |
| 2023 | Anna Fitzpatrick | Good Girl | Nominee | |
| 2023 | Joseph Kakwinokanasum | My Indian Summer | Nominee | |
| 2023 | Chris Kelly | A Kid Called Chatter | Nominee | |
| 2023 | Chelene Knight | Junie | Nominee | |
| 2023 | Anne Lardeux | The Second Substance | Nominee | |
| 2023 | Jim McEwen | Fearnoch | Nominee | |
| 2023 | Erica McKeen | Tear | Nominee | |
| 2023 | Dimitri Nasrallah | Hotline | Nominee | |

=== Poetry ===
ReLit Award for Poetry winners and shortlists
| Year | Author(s) | Title | Result | Ref. |
|---|---|---|---|---|
| 2001 | S. D. Johnson | Hymns to Phenomena | Winner | |
| 2001 | Mark Cochrane | Change Room | Nominee | |
| 2001 | Susan Gillis | Swimming Among the Ruins | Nominee | |
| 2001 | Adeena Karasick | Dyssemia Sleaze | Nominee | |
| 2001 | John Reibetanz | Mining for Sun | Nominee | |
| 2001 | Matt Robinson | A Ruckus of Awkward Stacking | Nominee | |
| 2002 | Lisa Robertson | The Weather | Winner | |
| 2002 | Christian Bök | Eunoia | Nominee | |
| 2002 | Karen Solie | Pigeon | Nominee | |
| 2003 | Margaret Christakos | Excessive Love Prostheses | Winner | |
| 2003 | Lise Downe | Disturbances of Progress | Nominee | |
| 2003 | Steve McCaffery | Seven Pages Missing (Vol. 2) | Nominee | |
| 2003 | Jay Millar | Mycological Studies | Nominee | |
| 2004 | Souvankham Thammavongsa | Small Arguments | Winner | |
| 2004 | Gil Adamson | Ashland | Nominee | |
| 2004 | David O'Meara | The Vicinity | Nominee | |
| 2004 | Russell Thornton | House Built of Rain | Nominee | |
| 2005 | A. F. Moritz | Night Street Repairs | Winner | |
| 2005 | Aislinn Hunter | The Possible Past | Nominee | |
| 2005 | Pierre Nepveu | Mirabel | Nominee | |
| 2005 | Mark Truscott | Said Like Reeds or Things | Nominee | |
| 2006 | Leon Rooke | Hot Poppies | Winner | |
| 2006 | Donato Mancini | Ligatures | Nominee | |
| 2006 | Eric Miller | In the Scaffolding | Nominee | |
| 2006 | B. W. Powe | The Unsaid Passing | Nominee | |
| 2007 | Daniel Scott Tysdal | Predicting the Next Big Advertising Breakthrough Using a Potentially Dangerous Method | Winner | |
| 2007 | George Elliott Clarke | Black | Nominee | |
| 2007 | Susan Elmslie | I, Nadja | Nominee | |
| 2007 | Bill Kennedy and Darren Wershler-Henry | Apostrophe | Nominee | |
| 2007 | Esther Mazakian | All the Lifters | Nominee | |
| 2007 | K. I. Press | Types of Canadian Women | Nominee | |
| 2007 | Ali Riley | Tear Down | Nominee | |
| 2007 | Michael V. Smith | What You Can't Have | Nominee | |
| 2007 | Sharon Thesen | The Good Bacteria | Nominee | |
| 2008 | Gillian Wigmore | Soft Geography | Winner | |
| 2008 | Colin Browne | The Shovel | Nominee | |
| 2008 | Marita Dachsel | All Things Said & Done | Nominee | |
| 2008 | Donato Mancini | Æthel | Nominee | |
| 2008 | David McGimpsey | Sitcom | Nominee | |
| 2008 | Nadine McInnis | Two Hemispheres | Nominee | |
| 2008 | Stuart Ross | I Cut My Finger | Nominee | |
| 2009 | Maurice Mierau | Fear Not | Winner | |
| 2009 | David O'Meara | Noble Gas, Penny Black | Nominee | |
| 2009 | Philip Kevin Paul | Little Hunger | Nominee | |
| 2009 | Stuart Ross | Dead Cars in Managua | Nominee | |
| 2009 | Shannon Stewart | Penny Dreadful | Nominee | |
| 2009 | R. M. Vaughan | Troubled | Nominee | |
| 2009 | Fred Wah | Sentenced to Light | Nominee | |
| 2010 | Gillian Jerome | Red Nest | Winner | |
| 2010 | Gregory Betts | The Others Raisd in Me | Nominee | |
| 2010 | Sky Gilbert | A Nice Place to Visit | Nominee | |
| 2010 | Michael Kenyon | The Last House | Nominee | |
| 2010 | Lisa Robertson | Lisa Robertson's Magenta Soul Whip | Nominee | |
| 2010 | Damian Rogers | Paper Radio | Nominee | |
| 2010 | Patrick Woodcock | Always Die Before Your Mother | Nominee | |
| 2011 | Dani Couture | Sweet | Winner | |
| 2011 | Jim Christy | Marimba Forever | Nominee | |
| 2011 | Jen Currin | The Inquisition Yours | Nominee | |
| 2011 | Steve McOrmond | The Good News About Armageddon | Nominee | |
| 2011 | Adam Seelig | Every Day in the Morning (Slow) | Nominee | |
| 2011 | Meaghan Strimas | A Good Time Had by All | Nominee | |
| 2011 | Ian Williams | You Know Who You Are | Nominee | |
| 2012 | Patrick Friesen | Jumping in the Asylum | Winner | |
| 2012 | John Mikhail Asfour | Blindfold | Nominee | |
| 2012 | Ken Babstock | Methodist Hatchet | Nominee | |
| 2012 | Marsha Barber | What Is the Sound of Someone Unravelling | Nominee | |
| 2012 | Jonathan Bennett | Civil and Civic | Nominee | |
| 2012 | Linda Besner | The Id Kid | Nominee | |
| 2012 | Michael Blouin | Wore Down Trust | Nominee | |
| 2012 | Stephanie Bolster | A Page from the Wonders of Life on Earth | Nominee | |
| 2012 | Mark Callanan | Gift Horse | Nominee | |
| 2012 | Sam Cheuk | Love Figures | Nominee | |
| 2012 | George Elliott Clarke | Red | Nominee | |
| 2012 | Meira Cook | A Walker in the City | Nominee | |
| 2012 | Barry Dempster | Dying a Litte | Nominee | |
| 2012 | Desi Di Nardo | The Cure Is a Forest | Nominee | |
| 2012 | Lisa Downe | This Way | Nominee | |
| 2012 | Kristy Elliot | True | Nominee | |
| 2012 | Linda Frank | Insomniac Blues | Nominee | |
| 2012 | Kevin McPherson Eckhoff | Easy Peasy | Nominee | |
| 2012 | Gabe Foreman | A Complete Encyclopedia of Different Types of People | Nominee | |
| 2012 | Helen Guri | Match | Nominee | |
| 2012 | Joy Hiemstra-Van der Horst | Apologetic for Joy | Nominee | |
| 2012 | Cornelia Hoogland | Crow | Nominee | |
| 2012 | Cornelia Hoogland | Woods Wolf Girl | Nominee | |
| 2012 | Joel Thomas Hynes | Straight Razor Days | Nominee | |
| 2012 | Luciano Iacobelli | Book of Disorders | Nominee | |
| 2012 | Sean Johnston | The Ditch was Lit Like This | Nominee | |
| 2012 | Jim Johnstone | Sunday, the Locusts | Nominee | |
| 2012 | Jake Kennedy | Appolinaire's Speech to the War Medic | Nominee | |
| 2012 | Leigh Kotsilidis | Hypotheticals | Nominee | |
| 2012 | Richard Krueger | The Monotony of Fatal Accidents | Nominee | |
| 2012 | Anita Lahey | Spinning Side Kick | Nominee | |
| 2012 | G. P. Lainsbury | Versions of North | Nominee | |
| 2012 | Patrick Lane | The Collected Poems of Patrick Lane | Nominee | |
| 2012 | JonArno Lawson | There Devil, Eat That | Nominee | |
| 2012 | Shelley A. Leedhal | Wretched Beast | Nominee | |
| 2012 | Douglas Livingston | Myoclonus | Nominee | |
| 2012 | David McGimpsey | L’il Bastard | Nominee | |
| 2012 | Christian McPherson | The Sun Has Forgotten Where I Live | Nominee | |
| 2012 | Kathryn Mockler | Onion Man | Nominee | |
| 2012 | Karen Mulhallen | The Pillow Books | Nominee | |
| 2012 | Jim Nason | Narcissus Unfolding | Nominee | |
| 2012 | Jude Neale | Only the Fallen Can See | Nominee | |
| 2012 | Lillian Necakov | Hooligans | Nominee | |
| 2012 | Ruth Roach Pierson | Contrary | Nominee | |
| 2012 | Adam Pottle | Beautiful Mutants | Nominee | |
| 2012 | Shane Rhodes | Err | Nominee | |
| 2012 | Giovanna Riccio | Strong Bread | Nominee | |
| 2012 | Robin Richardson | Grunt of the Minotaur | Nominee | |
| 2012 | Sandra Ridley | Post-Apothecary | Nominee | |
| 2012 | Stan Rogal | Dance, Monster! | Nominee | |
| 2012 | Annh Scowcroft | The Truth of Houses | Nominee | |
| 2012 | Steven Ross Smith | Fluttertongue 5 | Nominee | |
| 2012 | Robert Earl Stewart | Campfire Radio Rhapsody | Nominee | |
| 2012 | Cathy Stonehouse | Grace Shiver | Nominee | |
| 2012 | Todd Swift | England Is Mine | Nominee | |
| 2012 | Gillian Sze | The Anatomy of Clay | Nominee | |
| 2012 | Bruce Taylor | No End in Strangeness | Nominee | |
| 2012 | Nick Thran | Earworm | Nominee | |
| 2012 | Carey Toane | The Crystal Palace | Nominee | |
| 2012 | Lesley Trites | Echoic Mimic | Nominee | |
| 2012 | Yi-Mei Tsiang | Sweet Devilry | Nominee | |
| 2012 | ursula Vaira | And See What Happens | Nominee | |
| 2012 | Leslie Vryenhoek | Gulf | Nominee | |
| 2012 | Elana Wolff | Startled Night | Nominee | |
| 2012 | Jan Zwicky | Forge | Nominee | |
| 2013 | Steven Price | Omens in the Year of the Ox | Winner | |
| 2013 | Ronna Bloom | Cloudy with a Fire in the Basement | Nominee | |
| 2013 | Cliff Burns | New and Selected Poems | Nominee | |
| 2013 | Jason Heroux | Natural Capital | Nominee | |
| 2013 | Leah Horlick | Riot Lung | Nominee | |
| 2013 | Grant Loveys | Our Gleaming Bones Unrobed | Nominee | |
| 2013 | Christine McNair | Conflict | Nominee | |
| 2013 | Erín Moure | The Unmentionable | Nominee | |
| 2013 | Catherine Owen | Trobairitz | Nominee | |
| 2013 | Ian Williams | Personals | Nominee | |
| 2014 | Charmaine Cadeau | Placeholder | Winner | |
| 2014 | Stephen Brockwell | Complete Surprising Fragments of Improbable Books | Nominee | |
| 2014 | Jason Camlot | What the World Said | Nominee | |
| 2014 | Kate Cayley | How This World Comes to an End | Nominee | |
| 2014 | Margaret Christakos | Multitudes | Nominee | |
| 2014 | Jim Christy | This Cockeyed World | Nominee | |
| 2014 | Amber Dawn | How Poetry Saved My Life | Nominee | |
| 2014 | Dina Del Bucchia | Coping With Emotions and Otters | Nominee | |
| 2014 | Adam Dickinson | The Polymers | Nominee | |
| 2014 | Glen Downie | Monkey Soap | Nominee | |
| 2014 | Kevin McPherson Eckhoff | Forge | Nominee | |
| 2014 | Catherine Greenwood | The Lost Letters | Nominee | |
| 2014 | Niki Koulouris | The Sea With No One in It | Nominee | |
| 2014 | Daphne Marlatt | Liquidities | Nominee | |
| 2014 | Sharon McCartney | Hard Ass | Nominee | |
| 2014 | David O'Meara | A Pretty Sight | Nominee | |
| 2014 | Robin Richardson | Knife Throwing Through Self-Hypnosis | Nominee | |
| 2014 | Stan Rogal | Love's Not the Way To | Nominee | |
| 2014 | Stuart Ross | Our Days in Vaudeville | Nominee | |
| 2014 | David Seymour | For Display Purposes Only | Nominee | |
| 2014 | Ann Shin | The Family China | Nominee | |
| 2014 | Jacqueline Turner | The Ends of the Earth | Nominee | |
| 2015 | Sina Queyras | MxT | Winner | |
| 2015 | Rolli | Mavor's Bones | Nominee | |
| 2015 | Ken Babstock | On Malice | Nominee | |
| 2015 | Dani Couture | Yaw | Nominee | |
| 2015 | Jen Currin | School | Nominee | |
| 2015 | Frank Davey | Poems Suitable to Current Material Conditions | Nominee | |
| 2015 | Brecken Hancock | Broom Broom | Nominee | |
| 2015 | Aisha Sasha John | Thou | Nominee | |
| 2015 | Michael Lista | The Scarborough | Nominee | |
| 2015 | Susan Paddon | Two Tragedies in 429 Breaths | Nominee | |
| 2015 | Stan Rogal | After Words | Nominee | |
| 2015 | Jeffrey Round | In the Museum of Leonardo Da Vinci | Nominee | |
| 2015 | Blair Trewartha | Easy Fix | Nominee | |
| 2015 | Peter Unwin | When We Were Old | Nominee | |
| 2015 | Sheri-D Wilson | Open Letter: Woman Against Violence Against Women | Nominee | |
| 2015 | Deanna Young | House Dreams | Nominee | |
| 2016 | Susan Goyette | The Brief Reincarnation of a Girl | Winner | |
| 2016 | Tara Azzopardi | Last Stop, Lonesome Town | Nominee | |
| 2016 | Méira Cook | Monologue Dogs | Nominee | |
| 2016 | Raoul Fernandes | Transmitter and Receiver | Nominee | |
| 2016 | Eva H.D. | Rotten Perfect Mouth | Nominee | |
| 2016 | David McGimpsey | Asbestos Heights | Nominee | |
| 2016 | Nick Papaxanthos | Love Me Tender | Nominee | |
| 2016 | Leah Lakshmi Piepzna-Samarasinha | Bodymap | Nominee | |
| 2016 | Al Pittman | Collected Poems | Nominee | |
| 2016 | K. I. Press | Exquisite Monsters | Nominee | |
| 2016 | Damian Rogers | Dear Leader | Nominee | |
| 2016 | Carolyn Marie Souaid | This World We Invented | Nominee | |
| 2016 | Jeff Steudel | Foreign Park | Nominee | |
| 2016 | Harry Thurston | Keeping Watch at the End of the World | Nominee | |
| 2016 | Daniel Scott Tysdal | Fauxccasional Poems | Nominee | |
| 2016 | Liz Worth | No Work Finished Here | Nominee | |
| 2017 | Katherine Leyton | All the Gold Hurts My Mouth | Winner | |
| 2017 | Jordan Abel | Injun | Nominee | |
| 2017 | Adele Barclay | If I Were in a Cage I’d Reach out For You | Nominee | |
| 2017 | Stephen Brockwell | All of Us Reticent, Here, Together | Nominee | |
| 2017 | Sarah Burgoyne | Saint Twin | Nominee | |
| 2017 | Clint Burnham | Pound @ Guantanamo | Nominee | |
| 2017 | George Elliott Clarke | Canticles I | Nominee | |
| 2017 | Wayne Clifford | The Exile Papers, Part Four | Nominee | |
| 2017 | Michael Crummey | Little Dogs | Nominee | |
| 2017 | Rocco de Giacomo | Every Night of Our Lives | Nominee | |
| 2017 | Beth Everest | Silent Sister | Nominee | |
| 2017 | M. A. C. Farrant | The Days | Nominee | |
| 2017 | David Fraser | After All the Scissor Work Is Done | Nominee | |
| 2017 | Kerry Gilbert | Tight Wire | Nominee | |
| 2017 | Christopher Gudgeon | Assdeep in Wonder | Nominee | |
| 2017 | Eva H.D. | Shiner | Nominee | |
| 2017 | Jason Heroux | Hard Work Cheering Up Sad Machines | Nominee | |
| 2017 | Jessica Hiemstra | The Holy Nothing | Nominee | |
| 2017 | JonArno Lawson | The Hobo’s Crowbar | Nominee | |
| 2017 | Sharon McCartney | Metanoia | Nominee | |
| 2017 | Jim McLean | Nineteen Fifty-Seven | Nominee | |
| 2017 | Jim Nason | Touch Anywhere to Begin | Nominee | |
| 2017 | Monty Reid | Meditatio Placentae | Nominee | |
| 2017 | Lisa Robertson | 3 Summers | Nominee | |
| 2017 | Stuart Ross | A Sparrow Came Down Resplendent | Nominee | |
| 2017 | Angeline Schellenberg | Tell Them It Was Mozart | Nominee | |
| 2017 | Kilby Smith-McGregor | Kids in Triage | Nominee | |
| 2017 | Meaghan Strimas | Yes or Nope | Nominee | |
| 2017 | Aritha Van Herk | Stampede and the Westness of West | Nominee | |
| 2017 | Margo Wheaton | The Unlit Path Behind the House | Nominee | |
| 2018 | Rhonda Ganz | Frequent, Small Loads of Laundry | Winner | |
| 2018 | Shirley Camia | Children Shouldn’t Use Knives and Other Tales | Nominee | |
| 2018 | Allan Cooper | Everything We’ve Loved Comes Back to Find Us | Nominee | |
| 2018 | Lynn Crosbie | The Corpses of the Future | Nominee | |
| 2018 | Michael Dennis | Bad Engine | Nominee | |
| 2018 | Susan Elmslie | Museum of Kindness | Nominee | |
| 2018 | Jim Johnstone | The Chemical Life | Nominee | |
| 2018 | Shane Neilson | Dysphoria | Nominee | |
| 2018 | Jamie Sharpe | Dazzle Ships | Nominee | |
| 2018 | Kai Cheng Thom | A Place Called No Homeland | Nominee | |
| 2018 | Steve Venright | The Least You Can Do Is Be Magnificent | Nominee | |
| 2018 | John Emil Vincent | Excitement Tax | Nominee | |
| 2018 | Liz Worth | The Truth Is Told Better This Way | Nominee | |
| 2018 | Tara-Michelle Ziniuk | Whatever, Iceberg | Nominee | |
| 2019 | Robin Richardson | Sit How You Want | Winner | |
| 2019 | bpNichol | Night on Prose Mountain | Nominee | |
| 2019 | Chris Bailey | What Your Hands Have Done | Nominee | |
| 2019 | Michelle Brown | Safe Words | Nominee | |
| 2019 | Lori Cayer | Mrs. Romanov | Nominee | |
| 2019 | Dani Couture | Listen Before Transmit | Nominee | |
| 2019 | Degan Davis | What Kind of Men Are You | Nominee | |
| 2019 | Adam Dickinson | Anatomic | Nominee | |
| 2019 | Joe Fiorito | City Poems | Nominee | |
| 2019 | Linda Frank | Divided | Nominee | |
| 2019 | Eve Joseph | Quarrels | Nominee | |
| 2019 | Julie McIsaac | We Like Feelings. We Are Serious | Nominee | |
| 2019 | Nathaniel G. Moore | Goodbye Horses | Nominee | |
| 2019 | Helen Fogwill Porter | Full Circle | Nominee | |
| 2019 | Shannon Quinn | Nightlight for Children of Insomniacs | Nominee | |
| 2019 | Matthew Tierney | Midday at the Super-Kamiokande | Nominee | |
| 2020 | Cassandra Blanchard | Fresh Pack of Smokes | Winner | |
| 2020 | James Arthur | The Suicide's Son | Nominee | |
| 2020 | Lisa Baird | Winter's Cold Girls | Nominee | |
| 2020 | Jonathan Ball | The National Gallery | Nominee | |
| 2020 | Adèle Barclay | Renaissance Normcore | Nominee | |
| 2020 | Billy-Ray Belcourt | NDN Coping Mechanisms | Nominee | |
| 2020 | Lindsay Bird | Boom Time | Nominee | |
| 2020 | Tom Dawe | New and Collected Poems | Nominee | |
| 2020 | Matthew Gwathmey | Our Latest in Folktales | Nominee | |
| 2020 | Jennica Harper | Bounce House | Nominee | |
| 2020 | James Hawes | Breakfast with a Heron | Nominee | |
| 2020 | Mark Laba | The Inflatable Life | Nominee | |
| 2020 | Vincent Pagé | This Is the Emergency Present | Nominee | |
| 2020 | Stuart Ross | Motel of the Opposable Thumbs | Nominee | |
| 2021 | Simina Banu | Pop | Winner | |
| 2021 | Ken Babstock | Swivelmount | Nominee | |
| 2021 | Conyer Clayton | We Shed Our Skin Like Dynamite | Nominee | |
| 2021 | Peter Dubé | The Headless Man | Nominee | |
| 2021 | Susan Goyette | Anthesis | Nominee | |
| 2021 | Phil Hall | Niagara & Government | Nominee | |
| 2021 | Mathew Henderson | Roguelike | Nominee | |
| 2021 | Amy LeBlanc | I Know Something You Don't Know | Nominee | |
| 2021 | David Ly | Mythical Man | Nominee | |
| 2021 | Kyeren Regehr | Cult Life | Nominee | |
| 2021 | Ray Robertson | The Old Man in the Mirror Isn't Me | Nominee | |
| 2021 | jaye simpson | it was never going to be okay | Nominee | |
| 2021 | Emily Skov-Nielsen | The Knowing Animals | Nominee | |
| 2021 | Sarah Venart | I Am the Big Heart | Nominee | |
| 2021 | Ian Williams | Word Problems | Nominee | |
| 2022 | Charlie Petch | Why I Was Late | Winner | |
| 2022 | Andrea Actis | Grey All Over | Nominee | |
| 2022 | George Elliott Clarke | J'Accuse...! | Nominee | |
| 2022 | Molly Cross-Blanchard | Exhibitionist | Nominee | |
| 2022 | Brianna Ferguson | A Nihilist Walks Into a Bar | Nominee | |
| 2022 | Rayanne Haines | Tell the Birds Your Body Is Not A Gun | Nominee | |
| 2022 | Susan Holbrook | Ink Earl | Nominee | |
| 2022 | Dallas Hunt | Creeland | Nominee | |
| 2022 | Nathaniel G. Moore | Constrictor | Nominee | |
| 2022 | Marguerite Pigeon | The Endless Garment | Nominee | |
| 2022 | Charles C. Smith | Searching for Eastman | Nominee | |
| 2022 | Jeremy Stewart | In Singing, He Composed a Song | Nominee | |
| 2022 | Dane Swan | Love and Other Failed Religions | Nominee | |
| 2022 | Assiyah Jamilla Touré | Autowar | Nominee | |
| 2022 | Peter Unwin | The Infinite Park | Nominee | |
| 2023 | Sarah Ens | Flyway | Winner | |
| 2023 | Carellin Brooks | Learned | Nominee | |
| 2023 | Conyer Clayton | But the Sun, and the Ships, and the Fish, and the Waves | Nominee | |
| 2023 | Sophie Crocker | Brat | Nominee | |
| 2023 | Adebe DeRango-Adem | Vox Humana | Nominee | |
| 2023 | Candace de Taeye | Pronounced/Workable | Nominee | |
| 2023 | Michael Fraser | The Day-Breakers | Nominee | |
| 2023 | Luke Hathaway | The Affirmations | Nominee | |
| 2023 | Jim Johnstone | Infinity Network | Nominee | |
| 2023 | David Ly | Dream Of Me As Water | Nominee | |
| 2023 | Tyler Pennock | Blood | Nominee | |
| 2023 | Daniel Scott Tysdal | The End Is in the Middle | Nominee | |
| 2023 | Jennifer Zilm | First-Time Listener | Nominee | |

=== Short fiction ===
ReLit Award Short Fiction winners and shortlists
| Year | Author(s) | Title | Result | Ref. |
|---|---|---|---|---|
| 2001 | Mark Anthony Jarman | 19 Knives | Winner | |
| 2001 | Paul Glennon | How Did You Sleep? | Nominee | |
| 2001 | Steven Hayward | Buddha Stevens | Nominee | |
| 2001 | Don Kerr | Love and the Bottle | Nominee | |
| 2001 | Annabel Lyon | Oxygen | Nominee | |
| 2001 | Jan Thornhill | Drought | Nominee | |
| 2002 | Bill Gaston | Mount Appetite | Winner | |
| 2002 | Richard Cumyn | Viking Brides | Nominee | |
| 2002 | Kristi-Ly Green | Nits | Nominee | |
| 2003 | Sean Johnston | A Day Does Not Go By | Winner | |
| 2003 | Richard Cumyn | The Obstacle Course | Nominee | |
| 2003 | Corey Frost | My Own Devices | Nominee | |
| 2003 | Emily Schultz | Black Coffee Night | Nominee | |
| 2004 | Tony Burgess | Fiction for Lovers | Winner | |
| 2004 | Phlip Arima | Broken Accidents | Nominee | |
| 2004 | Dana Bath | Universal Recipients | Nominee | |
| 2004 | Kathryn Kuitenbrouwer | Way Up | Nominee | |
| 2005 | James Grainger | The Long Slide | Winner | |
| 2005 | Lance Blomgren | Corner Pieces | Nominee | |
| 2005 | Corey Frost | The Worthwhile Flux | Nominee | |
| 2005 | James Marshall | Let's Not Let a Little Thing Like the End of the World Come Between Us | Nominee | |
| 2006 | Barry Webster | The Sound of All Flesh | Winner | |
| 2006 | Ami Sands Brodoff | Bloodknots | Nominee | |
| 2006 | Keath Fraser | 13 Ways of Listening to a Stranger | Nominee | |
| 2006 | Goran Simić | Yesterday's People | Nominee | |
| 2007 | Bill Gaston | Gargoyles | Winner | |
| 2007 | Ryan Arnold | The Coward Files | Nominee | |
| 2007 | Krista Bridge | The Virgin Spy | Nominee | |
| 2007 | Tim Conley | Whatever Happens | Nominee | |
| 2007 | Sharon English | Zero Gravity | Nominee | |
| 2007 | Nathan Sellyn | Indigenous Beasts | Nominee | |
| 2007 | Damian Tarnopolsky | Lanzmann and Other Stories | Nominee | |
| 2007 | Russell Wangersky | The Hour of Bad Decisions | Nominee | |
| 2007 | Cathleen With | Skids | Nominee | |
| 2008 | Roberta Rees | Long After Fathers | Winner | |
| 2008 | Salvatore Difalco | Black Rabbit | Nominee | |
| 2008 | Elyse Friedman | Long Story Short | Nominee | |
| 2008 | Liane Keightley | Seven Openings of the Head | Nominee | |
| 2008 | Dave Margoshes | Bix's Trumpet | Nominee | |
| 2008 | Christian McPherson | Six Ways to Sunday | Nominee | |
| 2008 | P. K. Page | Up on the Roof | Nominee | |
| 2009 | Lisa Foad | The Night Is a Mouth | Winner | |
| 2009 | Arjun Basu | Squishy | Nominee | |
| 2009 | Ian Colford | Evidence | Nominee | |
| 2009 | Mark Anthony Jarman | My White Planet | Nominee | |
| 2009 | Don McLellan | In the Quiet After Slaughter | Nominee | |
| 2009 | Pamela Stewart | Elysium | Nominee | |
| 2009 | Betsy Trumpener | The Butcher of Penetang | Nominee | |
| 2010 | Stuart Ross | Buying Cigarettes for the Dog | Winner | |
| 2010 | David Derry | Sentimental Exorcisms | Nominee | |
| 2010 | Amy Jones | What Boys Like | Nominee | |
| 2010 | Matt Lennox | Men of Salt, Men of Earth | Nominee | |
| 2010 | Steven Mayoff | Fatted Calf Blues | Nominee | |
| 2010 | Ryan Turner | What We're Made Of | Nominee | |
| 2010 | Richard Van Camp | The Moon of Letting Go | Nominee | |
| 2011 | Tony Burgess | Ravenna Gets | Winner | |
| 2011 | Darryl Joel Berger | Punishing Ugly Children | Nominee | |
| 2011 | Michelle Berry | I Still Don’t Even Know You | Nominee | |
| 2011 | Ivan E. Coyote | Missed Her | Nominee | |
| 2011 | Brian Joseph Davis | Ronald Reagan, My Father | Nominee | |
| 2011 | Jenn Farrell | The Devil You Know | Nominee | |
| 2011 | Jonathan Papernick | There Is No Other | Nominee | |
| 2011 | Anne Perdue | I’m a Registered Nurse Not a Whore | Nominee | |
| 2011 | Teri Vlassopoulos | Bats or Swallows | Nominee | |
| 2012 | Greg Kearney | Pretty | Winner | |
| 2012 | Tom Abray | Pollen | Nominee | |
| 2012 | Carolyn Black | The Odious Child | Nominee | |
| 2012 | Tim Conley | Nothing Could Be Further | Nominee | |
| 2012 | Matthew Firth | Shag Carpet Action | Nominee | |
| 2012 | Daniel Griffin | Stopping for Strangers | Nominee | |
| 2012 | Jesus Hardwell | Easy Living | Nominee | |
| 2012 | Britt Holmstrom | Leaving Berlin | Nominee | |
| 2012 | Jim Nason | The Girl on the Escalator | Nominee | |
| 2012 | Darcy Rhyno | Holidays | Nominee | |
| 2012 | Rolli | God's Autobio | Nominee | |
| 2012 | Mike Spry | Distillery Songs | Nominee | |
| 2012 | David Thompson | Talking at the Woodpilie | Nominee | |
| 2012 | Jessica Westhead | And Also Sharks | Nominee | |
| 2012 | David Whitton | The Reverse Cowgirl | Nominee | |
| 2013 | Ian Rogers | Every House Is Haunted | Winner | |
| 2013 | Wade Bell | Tracie's Revenge & Other Stories | Nominee | |
| 2013 | Domenico Capilongo | Subtitles | Nominee | |
| 2013 | Trevor Clark | Escape and Other Stories | Nominee | |
| 2013 | Elisabeth de Mariaffi | How to Get Along with Women | Nominee | |
| 2013 | Alex Leslie | People Who Disappear | Nominee | |
| 2013 | Sean Virgo | Dibidalen | Nominee | |
| 2013 | Donald Ward | The Weeping Chair | Nominee | |
| 2013 | Julie Wilson | Seen Reading | Nominee | |
| 2014 | Christine Miscione | Auxiliary Skins | Winner | |
| 2014 | Astrid Blodgett | You Haven't Changed a Bit | Nominee | |
| 2014 | Cliff Burns | Exceptions & Deceptions | Nominee | |
| 2014 | Austin Clarke | They Never Told Me | Nominee | |
| 2014 | Kelli Deeth | The Other Side of Youth | Nominee | |
| 2014 | Cynthia Flood | Red Girl Rat Boy | Nominee | |
| 2014 | Bill Haugland | After it Rains | Nominee | |
| 2014 | Sara Heinonen | Dear Leaves I Miss You | Nominee | |
| 2014 | Martin Hunter | The Critic and Other Stories | Nominee | |
| 2014 | Colette Maitland | Keeping the Peace | Nominee | |
| 2014 | Dana Mills | Someone Somewhere | Nominee | |
| 2014 | Leanne Betasamosake Simpson | Islands of Decolonial Love | Nominee | |
| 2014 | Andrew F. Sullivan | All We Want is Everything | Nominee | |
| 2014 | Peter Unwin | Life Without Death | Nominee | |
| 2015 | Megan Gail Coles | Eating Habits of the Chronically Lonesome | Winner | |
| 2015 | Greg Bechtel | Boundary Problems | Nominee | |
| 2015 | Kate Cayley | How You Were Born | Nominee | |
| 2015 | Jon Paul Fiorentino | I'm Not Scared of You or Anything | Nominee | |
| 2015 | Sean Johnston | We Don't Listen to Them | Nominee | |
| 2015 | Doretta Lau | How Does a Single Blade of Grass Thank the Sun | Nominee | |
| 2015 | Helen Marshall | Gifts for the One Who Comes After | Nominee | |
| 2015 | Elaine McCluskey | Hello, Sweetheart | Nominee | |
| 2015 | George McWhirter | The Gift of Women | Nominee | |
| 2015 | Kathy Page | Paradise & Elsewhere | Nominee | |
| 2015 | Marguerite Pigeon | Some Extremely Boring Drives | Nominee | |
| 2015 | Matt Rader | What I Want to Tell Goes Like This | Nominee | |
| 2015 | Shawn Syms | Nothing Looks Familiar | Nominee | |
| 2015 | Rolli | I Am Currently Working on a Novel | Nominee | |
| 2016 | Kevin Hardcastle | Debris | Winner | |
| 2016 | Anita Anand | Swing in the House | Nominee | |
| 2016 | Donna Besel | Lessons from a Nude Man | Nominee | |
| 2016 | Jim Christy | Bad Day for Ralphie | Nominee | |
| 2016 | Tim Conley | Dance Moves of the Near Future | Nominee | |
| 2016 | Cherie Dimaline | A Gentle Habit | Nominee | |
| 2016 | Rhonda Douglas | Welcome to the Circus | Nominee | |
| 2016 | Katherine Fawcett | The Little Washer of Sorrows | Nominee | |
| 2016 | Hugh Graham | Last Words | Nominee | |
| 2016 | Mark Anthony Jarman | Knife Party at the Hotel Europa | Nominee | |
| 2016 | Carole Glasser Langille | I Am What I Am Because You Are What You Are | Nominee | |
| 2016 | Lana Pesch | Moving Parts | Nominee | |
| 2016 | Ian Roy | Meticulous, Sad and Lonely | Nominee | |
| 2016 | Russell Smith | Confidence | Nominee | |
| 2016 | Jess Taylor | Pauls | Nominee | |
| 2016 | Richard Van Camp | Night Moves | Nominee | |
| 2017 | Kris Bertin | Bad Things Happen | Winner | |
| 2017 | Kelley Aitken | Canadian Shield | Nominee | |
| 2017 | Danila Botha | For All the Men and For All the Women I’ve Known | Nominee | |
| 2017 | Diane Bracuk | Middle-Aged Boys & Girls | Nominee | |
| 2017 | Robert Chafe | Two Man Tent | Nominee | |
| 2017 | Leesa Dean | Waiting for the Cyclone | Nominee | |
| 2017 | Alban Goulden | As If | Nominee | |
| 2017 | John Metcalf | The Museum at the End of the World | Nominee | |
| 2017 | Nathaniel G. Moore | Jettison | Nominee | |
| 2017 | Catherine Owen | The Day of the Dead | Nominee | |
| 2017 | Chad Pelley | Four-Letter Words | Nominee | |
| 2017 | Alice Petersen | Worldly Goods | Nominee | |
| 2017 | Leon Rooke | Swinging Through Dixie | Nominee | |
| 2017 | Rea Tarvydas | How to Pick Up a Maid in Statue Square | Nominee | |
| 2017 | Laura Trunkey | Double Dutch | Nominee | |
| 2017 | Gisele Villeneuve | Rising Abruptly | Nominee | |
| 2017 | Russell Wangersky | The Path of Most Resistance | Nominee | |
| 2017 | Martin West | Cretacea & Other Stories from the Badlands | Nominee | |
| 2018 | Daniel Zomparelli | Everything Is Awful and You're a Terrible Person | Winner | |
| 2018 | Paul Carlucci | A Plea for Constant Motion | Nominee | |
| 2018 | Sally Cooper | Smells Like Heaven | Nominee | |
| 2018 | Veronique Cote and Steve Gagnon | I Never Talk About It | Nominee | |
| 2018 | Eva Crocker | Barrelling Forward | Nominee | |
| 2018 | Peter Darbyshire | Has the World Ended Yet | Nominee | |
| 2018 | Norma Dunning | Annie Muktuk and Other Stories | Nominee | |
| 2018 | Bill Gaston | A Mariner’s Guide to Self Sabotage | Nominee | |
| 2018 | Christopher Gudgeon | The Encyclopedia of Lies | Nominee | |
| 2018 | David Huebert | Peninsula Sinking | Nominee | |
| 2018 | Annette Lapointe | You Are Not Needed Now | Nominee | |
| 2018 | Lori McNulty | Life on Mars | Nominee | |
| 2018 | Stan Rogal | Normalwhat’snormal | Nominee | |
| 2018 | Richard Rosenbaum | Things Don’t Break | Nominee | |
| 2018 | Leanne Betasamosake Simpson | This Accident of Being Lost | Nominee | |
| 2019 | Barry Callaghan | All the Lonely People | Winner | |
| 2019 | Melissa Bull | The Knockoff Eclipse | Nominee | |
| 2019 | Paul Carlucci | The High-Rise in Fort Fierce | Nominee | |
| 2019 | Jen Currin | Hider/Seeker | Nominee | |
| 2019 | Barry Dempster | Tread & Other Stories | Nominee | |
| 2019 | Aaron Kreuter | You and Me, Belonging | Nominee | |
| 2019 | Catriona Wright | Difficult People | Nominee | |
| 2020 | Tracey Waddleton | Send More Tourists...the Last Ones Were Delicious | Winner | |
| 2020 | Kris Bertin | Use Your Imagination! | Nominee | |
| 2020 | Darci Bysouth | Lost Boys | Nominee | |
| 2020 | Ian Colford | A Dark House and Other Stories | Nominee | |
| 2020 | Terry Doyle | Dig | Nominee | |
| 2020 | Alexander Laidlaw | Dead Flowers | Nominee | |
| 2020 | David Menear | Swallows Playing Chicken | Nominee | |
| 2020 | Christine Ottoni | Cracker Jacks for Misfits | Nominee | |
| 2020 | Julie Paul | Meteorites | Nominee | |
| 2020 | Ryan Turner | Half-Sisters | Nominee | |
| 2020 | Richard Van Camp | Moccasin Square Gardens | Nominee | |
| 2021 | Kristyn Dunnion | Stoop City | Winner | |
| 2021 | David Bergen | Here the Dark | Nominee | |
| 2021 | Frances Boyle | Seeking Shade | Nominee | |
| 2021 | Katherine Fawcett | The Swan Suit | Nominee | |
| 2021 | John Gould | The End of Me | Nominee | |
| 2021 | Faye Guenther | Swimmers in Winter | Nominee | |
| 2021 | Genni Gunn | Permanent Tourist | Nominee | |
| 2021 | Mark Anthony Jarman | Czech Techno | Nominee | |
| 2021 | Kaie Kellough | Dominoes at the Crossroads | Nominee | |
| 2021 | Michael Mirolla | Paradise Island and Other Galaxies | Nominee | |
| 2021 | John O'Neill | Goth Girls of Banff | Nominee | |
| 2022 | Sydney Hegele | The Pump | Winner | |
| 2022 | Meghan Bell | Erase and Rewind | Nominee | |
| 2022 | Clint Burnham | White Lie | Nominee | |
| 2022 | Doug Diaczuk | Just Like a Real Person | Nominee | |
| 2022 | Norma Dunning | Tainna | Nominee | |
| 2022 | David Huebert | Chemical Valley | Nominee | |
| 2022 | D. A. Lockhart | Breaking Right | Nominee | |
| 2022 | Bruce McDougall | Urban Disturbances | Nominee | |
| 2022 | Sarah Mintz | Handwringers | Nominee | |
| 2022 | Alix Ohlin | We Want What We Want | Nominee | |
| 2022 | Sofi Papamarko | Radium Girl | Nominee | |
| 2022 | Marion Quednau | Sunday Drive to Gun Club Road | Nominee | |
| 2022 | Meg Todd | Exit Strategies | Nominee | |
| 2022 | Daniel Scott Tysdal | Wave Forms and Doom Scrolls | Nominee | |
| 2022 | Katie Zdybel | Equipoise | Nominee | |
| 2023 | Francine Cunningham | God Isn't Here Today | Winner | |
| 2023 | Peter Abbot | Gaiety | Nominee | |
| 2023 | Diane Carley | Bodies in Trouble | Nominee | |
| 2023 | Rod Carley | Grin Reaping | Nominee | |
| 2023 | Lisa Fishman | World Naked Bike Ride | Nominee | |
| 2023 | Kathy Friedman | All the Shining People | Nominee | |
| 2023 | Elaine McCluskey | Rafael Has Pretty Eyes | Nominee | |
| 2023 | Alex Pugsley | Shimmer | Nominee | |
| 2023 | Stuart Ross | I Am Claude François and You Are a Bathtub | Nominee | |
| 2023 | Kate Story | Ferry Back the Gifts | Nominee | |
| 2023 | Darcy Tamayose | Ezra's Ghost | Nominee | |
| 2023 | Kasia Van Schaik | We Have Never Lived on Earth | Nominee | |
| 2023 | Brent Van Staalduinen | Cut Road | Nominee | |
| 2023 | Dan K. Woo | Taobao | Nominee | |
