= Michelle Berry =

Canadian writer

- Born: May 19, 1968 (age 58) San Francisco, California, U.S.
- Occupation: Author

Michelle Berry (born May 19, 1968 in San Francisco) is a Canadian author of three books of short story collection (How to Get There from Here, Margaret Lives in the Basement, and I Still Don't Even Know You) as well as six novels (What We All Want, Blur, Blind Crescent, Interference, This Book Will Not Save Your Life and The Prisoner and the Chaplain). In 2016, she opened The Hunter Street Bookstore in Peterborough, Ontario. Berry closed the brick-and-mortar store in 2020, but continued to operate an online ordering service.

== Personal life and education ==
Berry was born May 19, 1968 in San Francisco, United States. She earned a Bachelor of Arts from the University of Toronto in 1986 and later received a Master of Arts from the University of Guelph.

Berry married Stuart Baird in 1990 and has two daughters, Abigail Berry and Zoe Baird.

== Career ==
Berry published her first book, How to Get There from Here, in 1997 and has since published many more.

In addition to writing her own books, Berry reviewed books with The Globe and Mail for many years.

In October 2016, she opened The Hunter Street Bookstore in Peterborough, Ontario. She closed the brick-and-mortar store in June 2020, in part because of the pandemic, but rented space and continued to operate an online ordering service.

Berry has taught at the University of Toronto and mentored at Humber College.

== Critical reception ==
=== This Book Will Not Save Your Life (2011) ===
The Globe and Mail reviewed Berry's 2011 novel This Book Will Not Save Your Life favorably, with reviewer Moira Dann calling it a "a well-executed story that goes from quirky (intriguing off-centre family; blackly funny, even) to murky (unfettered, unrelenting dysfunction and despair, peopled by hard-to-like characters), while keeping the reader wondering what's going to happen next...The story is well-paced (even with the necessary repetition of its Rashomon-style narrative) and the characters are unforgettable."

=== Interference (2014) ===
Berry's 2014 novel Interference received mixed reviews. Writing in the National Post, Emily M. Keeler said, "Berry's better than most at weaving in and out of the perspectives of so many characters without losing steam; she manages her cast with considerable skill, and her approach makes it all the more enjoyable to piece together the goings on in fictional Parkville. Interference is like a short drive through a strange suburb, that rich domain of beautiful, frustrated youth and workaday adulthood; Berry's Parkville is a place many Canadians will recognize, but altered just slightly enough through her comic noir lens to let a little of the wit, and the fear, bleed out of the novel and into your head." By contrast in The Globe and Mail, reviewer Emily Donaldson suggested "Berry's characters are so thinly developed it's difficult to imagine them stripped of their banal problems."

=== The Prisoner and the Chaplain (2017) ===
Berry's sixth novel, The Prisoner and the Chaplain, was published in September 2017. "The terror and disgust she works up in the novel's closing passages have staying power beyond the contrivances of its plot," asserts a review in Quill & Quire.

== Awards and honours ==
Berry received grants from the Ontario Arts Council in 1995, 1999, and 2000, as well as a grant from Canada Council in 1998.

Awards for Berry's writing
Year	Title	Award	Result	Ref.
2010	This Book Will Not Save Your Life	Colophon Award	Winner	
2011	I Still Don’t Even Know You	Mary Scorer Award for Best Book Published by a Manitoba Publisher	Winner	
2011	I Still Don’t Even Know You	ReLit Award for Short Fiction	Shortlist	
2018	The Prisoner and the Chaplain	ReLit Award for Novel	Shortlist	

== Publications ==
- How to Get There from Here. Turnstone Press. 1997. ISBN 9780888012128.
- Margaret Lives in the Basement. Somerville House Pub. 1998. ISBN 9781894042284.
- What We All Want. Vintage Canada. 2001. ISBN 9780679311287.
- Blur. Random House Canada. 2002. ISBN 9780679311416.
- The Notebooks: Interviews and New Fiction from Contemporary Writers, edited with Natalee Caple. Anchor Canada. 2002. ISBN 9780385658270.
- Postcard Fictions. Key Porter Books. 2002. ISBN 9781552633359.
- Blind Crescent. Penguin Canada. 2005. ISBN 9780143016960.
- I Still Don't Even Know You. Turnstone Press. 2010. ISBN 9780888013682.
- This Book Will Not Save Your Life. Enfield & Wizenty. 2010. ISBN 9781926531045.
- Interference. 2014. ISBN 9781770411982.
- The Prisoner and the Chaplain. 2017. ISBN 9781928088431.
- Everything Turns Away. 2021. ISBN 9781989496398.
