= Michael Kenyon =

Michael Kenyon may refer to:

- Michael Kenyon (British writer) (1931–2005), British author of crime novels
- Michael H. Kenyon (born 1945), criminal
- Michael Kenyon (Canadian writer), Canadian novelist
- Michael Kenyon, a character in the 1954 film Forbidden Cargo
