= McGimpsey =

McGimpsey is an Irish and Scottish surname. Notable people with the surname include:

- David McGimpsey, Canadian poet and author
- Garth McGimpsey (born 1955), Northern Ireland amateur golfer
- Michael McGimpsey (born 1948), Northern Ireland politician
