= Catherine Owen =

Catherine Owen may refer to:

- Catherine Dale Owen (1900–1965), American stage and film actress
- Catherine Owen (writer), Canadian writer and musician
