= Shannon Stewart =

Shannon Stewart may refer to:

- Shannon Stewart (baseball), Major League baseball outfielder
- Shannon Stewart (model), America's Next Top Model contestant and Miss Ohio USA 2004 first runner-up
- Shannon Stewart (Playmate), Playboy Playmate
- Shannon Stewart (poet), Canadian writer
