= Julia Unwin =

British businesswoman (born 1956)

Dame Julia Unwin DBE FAcSS
- Born: 6 July 1956 (age 70)
- Education: Liverpool University; London School of Economics
- Occupation: Business executive
- Father: Peter Unwin

Dame Julia Unwin DBE FAcSS (born 6 July 1956) is a British businessperson who was chief executive of the Joseph Rowntree Foundation (JRF) and the Joseph Rowntree Housing Trust (JRHT). The Guardian in 2007 described her as a "major player in the voluntary sector". In 2012, she was appointed by the Scottish Government as a member of the Expert Working Group on Welfare and Constitutional Reform. In January 2026 she became the chair of the Charity Commission for England and Wales.

== Early life ==
Unwin is the daughter of Peter William Unwin, a retired diplomat. She studied history at Liverpool University and graduated Bachelor of Arts (BA) in 1978. She then went on to undertake postgraduate studies in Social Policy and Planning at the London School of Economics, graduating Master of Science (MSc) in 1991.

== Career ==
- 1978–1980: Field worker, Liverpool Council for Voluntary Service
- 1980-1982: Community Liaison officer, London Borough of Southwark social services
- 1982–1986: Head of Voluntary sector liaison team, Greater London Council
- 1986–1992: Director, Homeless Network
- 1992–2001: Board member, Housing Corporation
- 1995–1998: Chair of Refugee Council
- 1998–2003: Charity Commission for England and Wales: Charity Commissioner
- 2001–2006: Board member, National Consumer Council
- 2003–2006: Deputy Chair, Food Standards Agency

In January 2016, Unwin was appointed as an independent non-executive Director of Mears Group Plc. In January 2017, she was appointed as a non-executive director at Yorkshire Water. She is also a non-executive director of the Financial Reporting Council. She chaired the independent inquiry into the future of civil society, which concluded and published its findings in late 2018.

She was chief executive of JRF and JRHT from January 2007 to December 2016. Previous roles include being a freelance consultant between 1993 and 2006 – during this time Unwin undertook policy analysis, governance support and project evaluation. She has been a member of the peer review of Cabinet office (2000), a member of the Capability Review at DCLG (2006), Social Policy Adviser at NatWest Bank, and Senior Adviser to the Baring Foundation. She is a member of the Council at the University of York.

In January 2026 she became the chair of the Charity Commission for England and Wales.

== Honours ==
Unwin was appointed Officer of the Order of the British Empire (OBE) in the 2000 New Year Honours for services to the housing corporation, Commander of the Order of the British Empire (CBE) in 2006 as deputy chair of the Food Standards Agency for services to consumers, and Dame Commander of the Order of the British Empire (DBE) in the 2020 New Year Honours for services to civil society.

She received an Outstanding Leadership Award at the 2010 Charity Awards. The presenter said: "...it's hard to overstate the impact that her work has had on social policy in the UK."

== Family life ==
Unwin is married and has two children. They reside in York, England.

== Publications ==
- Lending money, the issues for grant making trusts, Baring Foundation, 1995
- Trends, Myths and Realities: Funding Policy and the Local Voluntary Sector, with Peter Westland; Association of Charitable Foundations, 1996
- Who Pays for Core Costs?, ACEVO, 1999
- Speaking Truth to Power, Baring Foundation, 2004
- The Grant Making Tango: Issues for Funders, Baring Foundation, 2004
- The Voluntary Sector delivering public services: Transfer or transformation?, with Will Paxton, Nick Pearce and Peter Molyneux; Joseph Rowntree Foundation, 2005
- Fruitful Funding: A guide to levels of engagement, NCVO, 2005
- The role of kindness in public policy, Carnegie UK Trust
