= Quednau =

Quednau may refer to:

- the German name for Severnaya Gora, Russia
- Marion Quednau (born 1952), Canadian author
