= Warsh (surname) =

Warsh is a surname. Notable people with the surname include:

- Cheryl Krasnick Warsh, Canadian historian
- David Warsh (born 1944), American journalist
- Jeffrey A. Warsh (born 1960), American attorney
- Kevin Warsh (born 1970), member of the Board of Governors of the Federal Reserve System
- Lewis Warsh (1944–2020), American poet, visual artist, professor, prose writer, editor, and publisher
- Sylvia Maultash Warsh, Canadian writer

== See also ==
- Warsh was the nickname of ‘Uthmān ibn Sa‘īd al-Quṭbī (died 812), an Egyptian transmitter of the Qur’ān
- Warsh recitation is a style of Qur’ānic recitation, named after the above individual
