= Michael Blouin =

Michael Blouin may refer to:

- Mike Blouin (born 1945), American politician
- Michael Blouin (writer), Canadian writer
