= Arjun Basu =

Canadian writer

- Born: Montreal, Quebec, Canada
- Occupation: writer
- Writing career
- Genres: novelist, short stories
- Notable works: Squishy, Waiting for the Man
- Website: Official website

Arjun Basu is a Canadian writer. He has published three award-nominated books, and was also known for his Twitter feed, on which he posted flash fiction branded as "Twisters".

Born and raised in Montreal to immigrant parents from India, Basu published his debut short story collection Squishy in 2008. The book was shortlisted for the ReLit Awards in 2009. His novel Waiting for the Man was published in 2014, and was a longlisted nominee for that year's Scotiabank Giller Prize. In 2025, he published his second novel, The Reeds, nominated for the Paragraphe Hugh MacLennan Prize for Fiction by the Quebec Writers Federation.

He is also the host of The Full Bleed Podcast, a show about the "future of magazines and the magazines of the future," a part of Magazeum, a network devoted to magazines and magazine professionals.
