= Charmaine Cadeau =

Canadian writer

- Born: Toronto, Ontario
- Occupation: writer
- Writing career
- Genre: poetry
- Notable work: Placeholder

Charmaine Cadeau is a Canadian writer, who won the ReLit Award for Poetry in 2015 for her collection Placeholder.

Originally from Toronto, Ontario, Cadeau was educated at the University of New Brunswick and the University of Albany. She is currently an associate professor of English literature at High Point University.

== Works ==
- What You Used to Wear (2004)
- Placeholder (2013)
- "Skytale" (2018)
