= Mark Anthony Jarman =

Canadian fiction writer (born 1955)

Mark Anthony Jarman (born 11 June 1955 in Edmonton, Alberta) is a Canadian fiction writer. Jarman's work includes the novel Salvage King, Ya!, the short story collection Knife Party at the Hotel Europa and the travel book Ireland's Eye.

A graduate of the Iowa Writers' Workshop, Jarman has taught at the University of New Brunswick and the University of Victoria.

Jarman's writing has won the O. Henry Award, the Gold National Magazine Award in nonfiction, the Jack Hodgins Fiction Prize, and has been a finalist for the Journey Prize. Jarman has been awarded the Maclean-Hunter Endowment Award twice.

== Personal life ==
Though native to Edmonton, Jarman has travelled extensively across the country and the world, visiting places such as Ireland, the United States and Italy. Jarman's natural interest in literature led him to pursue the craft of writing. Before becoming a teacher, Jarman worked as a truck driver and considered writing as a hobby. His personal interests include skiing, cycling, and hockey. Jarman is also a musician and is part of a local blues band, Toredown.

Mark Anthony Jarman is a Yaddo Fellow and has taught at the University of Victoria, the Banff Centre for the Arts, and the University of New Brunswick. He is fiction editor of The Fiddlehead.

== Style of writing ==
Jarman credits his style of writing to his experience at the Iowa Writers' Workshop, and cites author Barry Hannah as being a significant influence on his style. Jarman has stated that he prefers writing short stories as he "finds novels cumbersome". Literature critic Steven W. Beattie, on reviewing his short story collection My White Planet, stated that Jarman's writing differentiates from the norm of classic Canadian literature and focuses on "the delirious and courageous use of language to create startling effects". Jarman's short stories have been known to explore a variety of different themes, including war, crisis and Canadian culture (notably hockey). Beattie, reviewing one of the stories in the My White Planet collection, noted "'A Nation Plays Chopsticks' may be the finest explanation for Canadian's love affair with hockey I've ever read".

== Notable works ==
Jarman's books have been received positively, and have won and been nominated for a number of awards. One of his short story collections, 19 Knives, was met with acclaim and chosen as 'book of the year' by The Guardian newspaper. Jarman's writings have also earned him the O. Henry Award and Best American Essays, Gold National Magazine Award in nonfiction and have won the Maclean-Hunter Endowment Award twice. He has also won the Jack Hodgins Fiction Prize, and has been included in The Journey Prize Anthology and Best Canadian Stories. Furthermore, Jarman's Salvage King, Ya! is placed on Amazon Canada's 50 Essential Canadian books as well as number one on their best hockey fiction list.

Jarman is the author of Knife Party at the Hotel Europa (Goose Lane Editions), My White Planet, 19 Knives, New Orleans Is Sinking, Dancing Nightly in the Tavern, and the travel book Ireland's Eye. He has also published articles in Walrus, Canadian Geographic, The Barcelona Review, Vrij Nederland and reviews for The Globe and Mail.

He won the ReLit Award short fiction in 2001 for 19 Knives. He also received nominations in the same category for My White Planet in 2009, Knife Party at the Hotel Europa in 2016, and Czech Techno in 2021.

== Publications ==
- 1984: Dancing Nightly in the Tavern (Presse Porcépic) (stories)
- 1986: Killing the Swan (Presse Porcépic) (poems)
- 1997: Salvage King Ya! (Anvil Press) ISBN 1-895636-56-6 (novel)
- 1998: New Orleans is Sinking (Oberon) hardcover ISBN 0-7780-1089-9, paperback ISBN 0-7780-1090-2 (stories)
- 2000: 19 Knives (House of Anansi) ISBN 0-88784-650-5 (stories)
- 2002: Ireland's Eye: Travels (House of Anansi) ISBN 0-88784-178-3 (non-fiction)
- 2008: My White Planet (Thomas Allen) ISBN 0-88762-336-0 (stories)
- 2015: Knife Party at the Hotel Europa (Goose Lane Editions) ISBN 978-0-86492-918-1 (stories)
- 2022: Touch Anywhere to Begin (Goose Lane Editions) (non-fiction/travel)
- 2024: Burn Man (Biblioasis) ISBN 978-1-77196-547-7 (stories)
