= Christine Miscione =

Canadian writer

- Occupations: short story writer, novelist
- Writing career
- Period: 2010s-present
- Notable works: Auxiliary Skins, Carafola

Christine Miscione is a Canadian writer, who won the ReLit Award for short fiction in 2014 for her short story collection Auxiliary Skins.

Based in Canada, she was educated at Queen's University. She won the Hamilton Arts Award for best emerging writer in 2011, and the Gloria Vanderbilt/Exile Editions CVC Short Fiction Contest in 2012.

Her writing has also been published in Exile: The Literary Quarterly, This Magazine and The Puritan.

== Works ==
- Auxiliary Skins (2013, ISBN 978-1550963533)
