= Sharon English =

Canadian writer

- Born: 1965 (age 60–61)
- Occupation: writer
- Writing career
- Period: 2000s-present
- Notable work: Zero Gravity

Sharon English is a Canadian writer. Her short story collection Zero Gravity was a shortlisted nominee for the ReLit Awards, and a longlisted nominee for the Scotiabank Giller Prize, in 2007.

Originally from London, Ontario, she is currently based in Toronto, where she teaches creative writing at the University of Toronto's Innis College.

== Works ==
- Uncomfortably Numb (2002, ISBN 978-0889842502)
- Zero Gravity (2006, ISBN 978-0889842793)
- Night in the World (2022)
