= Matt Lennox =

Canadian fiction writer (born 1980)

- Born: 1980 (age 45–46); Orillia, Ontario
- Occupations: novelist, short story writer
- Writing career
- Language: English
- Years active: 2000s-present
- Notable works: Men of Salt, Men of Earth, Knucklehead

Matt Lennox (born 1980 in Orillia, Ontario) is a Canadian fiction writer, whose 2015 novel Knucklehead was a longlisted contender for the 2017 edition of Canada Reads.

A film studies graduate of York University, he enlisted in the Canadian Army and served in Kandahar, Afghanistan. He then studied creative writing at the University of Guelph, and published his debut short story collection Men of Salt, Men of Earth in 2009. The book was a finalist for the ReLit Awards in the short fiction category in 2010.

He published his debut novel The Carpenter in 2012. The novel was also translated into French as Rédemption. Knucklehead followed in 2015.
