= Donato Mancini =

Canadian poet

Donato Mancini is a Canadian poet. He is most noted for his 2017 collection Same Diff, which was a shortlisted Griffin Poetry Prize finalist in 2018.

He has also been a two-time ReLit Award nominee for his poetry collections Ligatures in 2006 and Æthel in 2008.

Originally from Burlington, Ontario, he is a graduate of the University of British Columbia.

== Books ==
- Ligatures, Vancouver: New Star Books, 2005
- Æthel, Vancouver: New Star Books, 2007
- Buffet World, Vancouver: New Star Books, 2011
- Loitersack, Vancouver: New Star Books, 2014
- Snowline, Buffalo/Toronto: eth Press, 2015
- Same Diff, Vancouver: Talonbooks, 2017
