= Martin West (writer) =

Canadian writer

Martin West (born 1959) is a Canadian writer. He is most noted for his 2017 novel Long Ride Yellow, which won the 2018 ReLit Award for Fiction.

He was previously a ReLit nominee in the short fiction category in 2016 for his collection Cretacea and Other Stories from the Badlands. The title story "Cretacea" was a shortlisted finalist for the Journey Prize in 2006.

Born in Victoria, British Columbia, he is a graduate of the University of British Columbia.
