= Mark Truscott =

Canadian poet (born 1970)

Mark Truscott (born 1970) is a Toronto poet. He was born in Bloomington, Indiana, United States. He attended several public schools and Nelson High School in Burlington, Ontario and went on for a B.A. and M.A. in English at McMaster University in Hamilton.

Truscott is the grandson of Olympian Alda Wilson.

His first collection, Said Like Reeds or Things (Coach House Books, 2004), was shortlisted for a ReLit Award and received an Alcuin Society Book Design Awards citation for Darren Wershler-Henry’s design. His third collection, Branches, won the inaugural Nelson Ball Prize. Poems appear in the anthologies Shift & Switch: New Canadian Poetry (Mercury Press, 2005) and Pissing Ice: An Anthology of 'New' Canadian Poets (BookThug, 2004), and in How to Read (and Write About) Poetry (Broadview Press, 2021). He co-edited the small magazine BafterC with Jay MillAr and curated the Test Reading Series.

== Poems online ==
- "Colour" (via The Walrus)
- from Branches (via the Cultural Society)

== Bibliography ==
- Said Like Reeds or Things (Coach House Books, 2004)
- Nature (Book*hug, 2010)
- Branches (Book*hug, 2018)
- Small Theatres (McGill-Queen's University Press, 2026)
