= Kris Bertin =

Canadian writer

- Born: Halifax, Nova Scotia
- Occupation: Writer
- Website: www.krisbertin.com

Kris Bertin is a Canadian writer, whose debut short story collection Bad Things Happen won the 2017 Danuta Gleed Literary Award and the 2017 ReLit Award for Short Fiction.

Based in Halifax, Nova Scotia, he was a longlisted Journey Prize nominee in 2012 for his short story "Is Alive and Can Move". His work has been published in The Malahat Review, Prism International, The New Quarterly and The Antigonish Review.

Bad Things Happen was published in 2016 by Biblioasis. His first graphic novel The Case of the Missing Men, illustrated by Alexander Forbes, was published by Conundrum Press in 2017.

His second short story collection, Use Your Imagination!, was shortlisted for the 2020 ReLit Award for fiction.
