= Ashley Little =

Canadian author (born 1983)

- Born: 1983 (age 42–43); Calgary, Alberta, Canada
- Education: University of Victoria, University of British Columbia
- Occupation: Writer
- Writing career
- Language: English
- Genre: Fiction
- Notable awards: Ethel Wilson Fiction Prize (2014); Sheila A. Egoff Children's Literature Prize (2014)

Ashley Little (born 1983) is a Canadian author of both adult and young adult literature.

== Early life and education ==
Little was born in Calgary, Alberta. She earned her Bachelor of Fine Arts in creative writing and film studies at the University of Victoria and Master of Fine Arts in creative writing from University of British Columbia. She lives in British Columbia's Okanagan Valley.

== Career ==
Little's debut novel PRICK: Confessions of a Tattoo Artist was published by Tightrope Books in 2011. She has since published several more novels, which have won or been nominated for awards, including the ReLit Award, Ethel Wilson Fiction Prize, and Sheila A. Egoff Children's Literature Prize.

In addition to writing novels, Little's short fiction has appeared in various literary journals and anthologies, including Room (2010), Broken Pencil (2011), and Writing Without Direction: 10 1/2 Short Stories by Canadian Authors Under 30.

Little served as the 2014 writer in residence for Calgary's Alexandra Writers Centre Society, and as the 2015 Vancouver Public Library Writer in Residence. She was also Wilfrid Laurier University's 2017 Edna Staebler Writer in Residence.

== Texts ==
=== Prick (2011) ===
Prick: Confessions of a Tattoo Artist, published September 1, 2011, by Tightrope Books, follows Anthony "Ant" Young, a 21-year-old artist who previously left home to escape violence. Ant is presently a tattoo apprentice with Hank the Tank, a founding member of a powerful gang, which exposes Ant to more violence. Throughout the novel, Ant struggles to be true to himself and focus on his passions.

Prick was nominated for the 2012 ReLit Award for Novel.

=== Anatomy of a Girl Gang (2013) ===
Anatomy of a Girl Gang, published October 15, 2013, by Arsenal Pulp Press. is "modeled loosely on Romeo and Juliet." It follows Black Roses, a teenage girl gang in Vancouver.

The novel received a starred review from Kirkus Reviews, who said the novel was "both gripping and moving, for those who can stomach the violence." Critics with the International Dublin Literary Award called the novel a "vivid and unnerving story of urban girl culture," and Publishers Weekly said, "The girls' journey is deeply felt and often shocking in its brutality." Lambda Literary provided a more negative review, stating, "The book is far too raw in its depictions of rape, gunplay, and drug use to sit comfortably in the young-adult section, but it seems destined to shock and thrill younger readers [...] The plot moves at top speed, much like the characters themselves." They further indicated that the book's narrative style meant "[readers] miss some of the connective tissue of human idiosyncrasy that lets characters truly move and live."

Anatomy of a Girl Gang won the 2014 Ethel Wilson Fiction Prize and was a finalist for the 2014 City of Vancouver Book Award and ReLit Award for Novel. In 2015, it was longlisted for the International Dublin Literary Award.

=== The New Normal (2013) ===
The New Normal, published February 28, 2013 by Orca Book Publishers, follows Tamar Robinson, whose parents are emotionally unavailable following the death of her younger sisters, which causes Tamar more distress as her hair starts falling out. However, throughout the novel, she is able to regain her confidence.

Publishers Weekly said the novel has "a lot of plot, but it moves quickly," and noted that "Tamar is so relatable and genuine that readers will be invested in her attempts to surmount the challenges that pile up." Booklist also reviewed the novel.

The New Normal won the 2014 Sheila A. Egoff Children's Literature Prize.

=== Niagara Motel (2016) ===
Niagara Motel, published November 1, 2016, by Arsenal Pulp Press, takes place in the early 1990s and follows eleven-year-old Tucker Malone, who lives with his mother, who is narcoleptic and works as a travelling stripper. One night, his mother falls asleep in the street in Niagara Falls and is hit by a car, after which Tucker enters the foster care system. While in the system, he meets Meredith, who is sixteen and pregnant. Together, the take a road trip across the United States in hopes of finding Tucker's father.

Kirkus Reviews called the novel "a very readable if dismal roadside adventure." Similarly, Lauren O'Brien, writing for Shelf Awareness, said, "The journey is so wildly inventive it's almost distracting (in the best of ways; go in blind and have Google handy)" and noted, "The strength of Little's characters and dialogue ensure the story never loses its focus or heart." Booklist also reviewed the novel.

Niagara Motel was shortlisted for the 2017 Ethel Wilson Fiction Prize and ReLit Award for Novel, and longlisted for the 2018 International Dublin Literary Award.

=== Confessions of a Teenage Leper (2018) ===
Confessions of a Teenage Leper, published September 25, 2018, by Penguin Teen, follows Abby Furlowe, who begins the novel as a beautiful, popular teenager. Early in the novel, Abby notices some spots on her skin, which she treats with creams, though the treatment doesn't work, and the spots spread. One day at cheerleading practice, she falls into a coma, which ultimately leads to a Hansen’s disease diagnosis. Following diagnosis, she enters a recovery center, then has to reflect on her identity and who she was before her illness.

Kirkus Reviews called the novel "an unusual twist on the typical sick teenager story." Similarly, Publishers Weekly wrote, "This unusual and inspiring story reminds readers that difficult circumstances can strengthen one’s character." Booklist's Beth McIntyre said, "With family secrets, a shocking illness, a treatment-center romance, and a sharp narrative voice, this book is sure to appeal to teen readers."

== Awards ==
Awards for Little's writing
Year	Title	Award	Result	Ref.
2012	Prick	ReLit Award for Novel	Nominee	
2014	Anatomy of a Girl Gang	City of Vancouver Book Award	Finalist	
2014	Anatomy of a Girl Gang	Ethel Wilson Fiction Prize	Winner	
2014	Anatomy of a Girl Gang	ReLit Award for Novel	Nominee	
2014	The New Normal	Sheila A. Egoff Children's Literature Prize	Winner	
2015	Anatomy of a Girl Gang	International Dublin Literary Award	Longlist	
2017	Niagara Motel	Ethel Wilson Fiction Prize	Shortlist	
2017	Niagara Motel	ReLit Award for Novel	Shortlist	
2018	Niagara Motel	International Dublin Literary Award	Longlist	

== Publications ==
- Prick: Confessions of a Tattoo Artist (2011)
- Anatomy of a Girl Gang (2013)
- The New Normal (2013)
- Niagara Motel (2016)
- Confessions of a Teenage Leper (2018)
