= Clint Burnham =

Canadian writer and academic

- Born: 1962 (age 63–64); Comox, British Columbia
- Occupations: Writer and academic

Clint Burnham (born 1962 in Comox, British Columbia) is a Canadian writer and academic.

He published the poetry collections Be Labour Reading (1997) and Buddyland (2000), and the short story collection Airborne Photo (1999), before publishing his debut novel Smoke Show in 2005. The novel was a shortlisted finalist for the Ethel Wilson Fiction Prize in 2006.

He was a ReLit Award nominee in the poetry category in 2018 for Pound @ Guantanamo (2017), and in the short fiction category in 2022 for White Lie (2021).

He has also published the poetry collections Rental Van (2007) and The Benjamin Sonnets (2009), and numerous academic non-fiction works on literature, art and architecture. He is a professor of English at Simon Fraser University.

His poems "Rent-a-Marxist" and "An Evening at Home" were anthologized in Seminal: The Anthology of Canada's Gay Male Poets (2007).

== Publications ==
=== As author ===
- Buddyland (1994)
- The Jamesonian Unconscious: The Aesthetics of Marxist Theory (1995)
- Be Labour Reading (1997)
- Airborne Photo (1999)
- Steven McCaffery (2003)
- Smoke Show (2006)
- Rental Van (2007)
- The Benjamin Sonnets (2009)
- The Only Poetry That Matters: Reading the Kootenay School of Writing (2012)
- Fredric Jameson and The Wolf of Wall Street (2016)
- Pound @ Guantánamo (2016)
- Does the Internet Have an Unconscious?: Slavoj Žižek and Digital Culture (2018)
- White Lie (2021)

=== As editor ===
- From Text to Txting: New Media in the Classroom, co-edited with Paul Budra (2012)
- Lacan and the Environment, co-edited with Paul Kingsbury (2021)
