= Carellin Brooks =

Canadian writer

- Writing career
- Period: 1990s–present
- Genres: Novels, non-fiction
- Notable work: One Hundred Days of Rain
- Notable awards: Edmund White Award; ReLit Award
- Website: Official website

Carellin Brooks is a Canadian writer, whose debut novel One Hundred Days of Rain won the Edmund White Award in 2016 and the ReLit Award for Fiction in 2017.

== Background ==
Originally from Vancouver, British Columbia, after a tumultuous childhood, Brooks became a ward of the state. Placed with loving foster parents, she lived in Salt Lake City, Utah, until the age of 14, when she ran away from her foster home and moved to Ottawa, Ontario, to live with her grandmother. She completed high school in Ottawa, and was a regular youth columnist for the Ottawa Sun.

After high school, she studied English and anthropology at McGill University in Montreal. While at McGill, she won the national Book City/Books in Canada Student Writing Award for poetry in 1992 and hosted a weekly radio show, Dykes on Mikes, on CKUT-FM.

She was awarded a Rhodes Scholarship in 1993, and was reported at the time as the first person to have won a Rhodes scholarship while having been out as lesbian on her application. After completing her studies at Oxford University, she returned to Vancouver, becoming a columnist for Xtra West and a book reviewer for the Vancouver Sun. She later became managing editor of the Vancouver-based publishing company New Star Books, and is a writing instructor at the University of British Columbia.

== Writing ==
She has published the non-fiction books Every Inch a Woman: Phallic Possession, Femininity, and the Text (2005), Wreck Beach (2007) and Fresh Hell: Motherhood in Pieces (2013), and edited the anthologies Bad Jobs: My Last Shift at Albert Wong's Pagoda and Other Ugly Tales of the Workplace (1998) on her own and Carnal Nation: Brave New Sex Fictions (2000) as coeditor with Brett Josef Grubisic.

Every Inch a Woman was a shortlisted Lambda Literary Award nominee in the LGBT studies category at the 19th Lambda Literary Awards in 2007.

One Hundred Days of Rain was the winner of the 2016 ReLit Award for Fiction and the Publishing Triangle's 2016 Edmund White Award for Debut Fiction.

== Works ==
=== Written ===
- —— (2005). Every Inch a Woman: Phallic Possession, Femininity, and the Text. University of British Columbia Press. ISBN 9780774812108.
- —— (2007). Wreck Beach. Arsenal Pulp Press. ISBN 9781554200313.
- —— (2013). Fresh Hell: Motherhood in Pieces. Anvil Press. ISBN 9781927335321.
- —— (2015). One Hundred Days of Rain. Bookthug. ISBN 9781771660907.

=== Edited ===
- —— (1998). Bad Jobs: My Last Shift at Albert Wong's Pagoda and Other Ugly Tales of the Workplace. Arsenal Pulp Press. ISBN 9781551520551.
- —— (2000). Carnal Nation: Brave New Sex Fictions. Arsenal Pulp Press. ISBN 9781551520834.
