= Cassandra Blanchard =

Canadian poet

Cassandra Blanchard is a Canadian poet. Her debut collection, Fresh Pack of Smokes, was the 2020 winner of the ReLit Awards for poetry.

A member of the Selkirk First Nation originally from Whitehorse, Yukon, she is currently based in Duncan, British Columbia, following a number of years living in Vancouver. Fresh Pack of Smokes is written as prose poetry, forming what has been described as a poetic memoir of her past experiences with drug addiction, sex work and coming out as queer.
