= Robin Richardson (writer) =

Canadian poet

Robin Richardson (born 1985) is a Canadian poet. She is most noted for her collection Sit How You Want, which was the 2018 winner of the Trillium Book Award for poetry and the 2019 winner of the ReLit Award for poetry.

She was a ReLit nominee on two prior occasions, for Grunt of the Minotaur (2012) and Knife Throwing Through Self-Hypnosis (2014).
