= Jowita Bydlowska =

Polish-Canadian writer and journalist

Jowita Bydlowska is a Polish-Canadian writer and a journalist who has published both works of fiction and nonfiction. Her writing has been described as brave and powerful, and frank.

Bydlowska published her first book, a memoir, Drunk Mom, to critical acclaim. She has since published three novels, an additional memoir, and a number of short stories and essays.

== Writing ==
=== Memoir ===
Drunk Mom published in 2013 by Doubleday Canada (HarperCollins Australia, 2013 and Penguin US, 2014) was described as pushing at boundaries, horrifyingly and beautifully written, and "stylistically affecting because it refused embellishment, exposing the trials and tragedies of addiction for what they truly are." Lena Dunham said, "I read Drunk Mom with my jaw on the floor, which doesn't happen to me that often." Because of its subject matter, Bydlowska's memoir received a lot of negative attention in the beginning, which she commented on publicly on the 10th anniversary of its publication saying, "It wasn't my memoir that was revealing something that was wrong with the world. It was the reception that was the most telling." Drunk Mom has been optioned by Colombian actress and producer Marcela Mar of Ganas Producciones.

In 2026 Bydlowska published a second memoir, Unshaming, chronicling her experiences with relapse and recovery. It was praised by Publishers Weekly as "generous and frank".

=== Fiction ===
Bydlowska's first novel, Guy, was published in 2016 by Buckrider Press (Wolsak and Wynn). Written in first-person from a male point-of-view, Toronto Life called it "a convincing portrait of the modern misogynist in a novel full of hilarious and disturbingly realistic detail".

Bydlowska's second novel, Possessed, came out in 2012 with Rare Machines (Dundurn Press) and has been described as provocatively embracing Camus and blending Gothic horror elements. Possessed was nominated for the ReLit Award in 2023 and was picked as the CBC's Best Canadian fiction of 2022.

Bydlowska's third novel, Monster, came out with Anvil Press in the fall of 2024.

=== Short stories ===
Bydlowska is also a short-story writer whose work has been selected to be included in two Best Canadian Stories anthologies (2017, 2023 with Biblioasis).

=== Other works ===
Bydlowska's work has appeared in the anthologies She's Shameless (Tightrope Books, 2009), Water (MIT Press, 2009), Women in Clothes (Penguin, 2014), Polished (Guernica Press, 2014).

Bydlowska is also an avid essayist and has written for a variety of publications – from Hazlitt to The Walrus to Salon magazine.

=== Journalism ===
Bydlowska wrote a series of popular columns on mental health for the Toronto Star.

== Books ==
- Drunk Mom. Doubleday Canada. 2013.
- Guy. Wolsak & Wynn. 2016.
- Possessed. Dundurn. 2022.
- Monster. Anvil Press. 2024.
- Unshaming: A Memoir of Recovery, Relapse, and What Comes After. McClelland & Stewart. 2026.
