= Katherine Leyton =

Canadian poet

Katherine Leyton is a Canadian poet, whose debut collection All the Gold Hurts My Mouth won the ReLit Award for poetry in 2017.

She has also served as poet-in-residence at the Al Purdy writers' retreat in Prince Edward County.

In late March 2021, her three-year-old son Jude went missing in the bush near the family cottage in Westport, Ontario. The boy was found safe three days later.
