= Amy Spurway =

Canadian writer

Amy Spurway is a Canadian writer from Nova Scotia, whose debut novel Crow was published in 2019. The novel, a black comedy about a woman returning home to Cape Breton Island to reunite with her estranged family after being diagnosed with terminal brain cancer, was a shortlisted finalist for the 2020 Stephen Leacock Memorial Medal for Humour and the 2020 ReLit Award for fiction.

Originally from the Cape Breton Regional Municipality, Spurway was educated at the University of New Brunswick and Ryerson University (now Toronto Metropolitan University), and has also written for Today's Parent and the Toronto Star. She currently lives in Dartmouth.
