= Peter Darbyshire =

Canadian journalist, blogger and author

Peter Darbyshire is a Canadian journalist, blogger and author. An editor and journalist with Canadian newspaper The Province and a self-published blogger and cartoonist, he has published literary fiction under his own name and fantasy literature under the pen name Peter Roman.

He won the ReLit Award for fiction in 2003 for his novel Please.

== Works ==
=== Standalone works and short stories ===
Includes standalone stories, novelettes, and novellas.

- Please (2003, ISBN 978-1-551-92562-2)
- The Warhol Gang (2010, ISBN 978-1-554-68076-4)
- I'd Never Been Shot for Real Before (2014, ASIN: B00L9KZ726)
- Has the World Ended Yet? Takes to Astonish (2017)

=== Book of Cross series ===
Writing as Peter Roman.

- The Mona Lisa Sacrifice (2013, ISBN 978-1-771-48145-8)
- The Dead Hamlets (2015, ISBN 978-1-771-48316-2)
- The Apocalypse Ark (2016, ISBN 978-1-771-48377-3)
