= Jason Heroux =

Canadian poet

- Born: 1971 (age 54–55); Montreal, Canada
- Occupations: Poet and novelist
- Known for: Poet laureate of Kingston, Ontario, 2019–2022

Jason Heroux (born 1971) is a Canadian poet and novelist. He was the third poet laureate of the city of Kingston, Ontario, Canada, a position that he held from 2019 to 2022. He is the author of five books of poetry and three novels; his works have been translated into French, Italian, and Arabic.

Heroux was born in Montreal, and has lived in Kingston since 1990. He has described his writing as "the surrealism of the everyday", a characterization elaborated on by Christopher Doda, who writes that Heroux's poems "contain a keen sense of the uncanny, the moment where the commonplace becomes unsettling, when one's comfortable surroundings become a landscape of disquietude."

Poems by Heroux were selected for Best Canadian Poetry in English in 2008, 2011, and 2016. His first poetry collection, Memoirs of an Alias, was called "an amazing debut" by a review in Books in Canada, and his 2012 collection Natural Capital was described as "a helluva good read" by a review in Arc Poetry Magazine, which concluded: "I'd give it several major prizes all at once." Heroux's novel Good Evening, Central Laundromat was shortlisted for the 2011 ReLit Awards, and his poetry collection Natural Capital was shortlisted for the 2013 ReLit Awards.
