= Rhonda Ganz =

Canadian poet and illustrator

- Occupations: Poet, illustrator
- Writing career
- Notable awards: ReLit Award (2018)
- Website: www.reganz.com

Rhonda Ganz is a Canadian poet and illustrator from Victoria, British Columbia, whose debut poetry collection Frequent, Small Loads of Laundry won the 2018 ReLit Award for poetry. It was a finalist for the 2018 City of Victoria Butler Book Prize. The book was also shortlisted for the Dorothy Livesay Poetry Prize in 2018.
