= Jim McEwen =

Jim McEwen is a Canadian writer, whose debut novel Fearnoch was published in 2022.

Born and raised in Dunrobin, Ontario, he spent a number of years living in St. John's, Newfoundland and Labrador, as a master's student in the creative writing program at Memorial University of Newfoundland. While there, he won the Cuffer Award and the Leaside Fiction Contest for local writers, and has had writing published in The Telegram and Riddle Fence.

Fearnoch, about the decline of a small Ottawa Valley farming town, was published by Breakwater Books. McEwen stated that the town of Fearnoch was based principally on his home community of Dunrobin, although he also added elements of the nearby communities of Carp and Constance Bay.

The book was a nominee for the ReLit Awards in 2023.
