= Jerrod Edson =

Canadian writer

Jerrod Edson (born 1974 in Saint John, New Brunswick) is a Canadian novelist. His work has been widely praised by critics, including fellow New Brunswick writer David Adams Richards who said in 2005 that Edson is "one of our best young writers." In 2010, the Telegraph-Journal claimed that Edson is "one of the best New Brunswick writers, period."

His novels all take place in Saint John and focus on the underbelly of society. His characters are often drunks who find redemption in one form or another. His novel The Goon was shortlisted for the 2011 ReLit Award for Best Novel. In 2013, he became a member of the Writers' Federation of New Brunswick. That same year his manuscript for The Moon is Real won the David Adams Richards Prize.

Edson's sixth novel, The Boulevard —his first work of speculative fiction— was published in 2023 by Galleon Books from Moncton, New Brunswick. Critically acclaimed by reviewers, it was hailed by novelist Ian Colford as an "irreverent triumph" and was listed as one of the year's best books by The Miramichi Reader.

His seventh book, a novella titled Animals was published in August 2025 by Galleon Books.

Edson continues to explore different genres with the forthcoming release of his eighth book, Riverbend, a thriller set in 1975 along the Kennebecasis River in Rothesay, New Brunswick.

From the New Brunswick Literary Encyclopedia: "Edson's vivid portrayal of the urban area, as well as the working class and underclass, creates a vision of Saint John that highlights the discrepancy between the pre-modern idyllic notion of life in Atlantic Canada and the more complicated reality of the region."

== Bibliography ==
- Riverbend. Moncton: Galleon Books, (forthcoming 2026).
- Animals. Moncton: Galleon Books, 2025.
- The Boulevard. Moncton: Galleon Books, 2023.
- The Moon is Real. Windsor: Urban Farmhouse Press, 2016.
- The Goon. Ottawa: Oberon Press, 2010.
- A Place of Pretty Flowers. Ottawa: Oberon Press, 2007.
- The Dirty Milkman. Ottawa: Oberon Press, 2005.
- The Making of Harry Cossaboom. Saint John: Dreamcatcher, 2000.
