= Ian Rogers (writer) =

Canadian writer

- Born: October 17, 1976 (age 49); Toronto, Ontario, Canada
- Occupations: supernatural and horror writer
- Writing career
- Period: 2010s-present
- Notable work: Every House Is Haunted
- Website: www.ian-rogers.com

Ian Rogers (born October 17, 1976) is a Canadian writer of supernatural and horror fiction. His debut collection, Every House Is Haunted, was the winner of the 2013 ReLit Award in the short fiction category. A story from the collection, "The House on Ashley Avenue," was a finalist for the 2012 Shirley Jackson Award in the novelette category and is currently in development as a feature film produced by Sam Raimi and Roy Lee.

Rogers is related to the late folk musician Stan Rogers and his brother Garnet Rogers.

Rogers is based in Peterborough, Ontario, and has worked as a webmaster and communications assistant for the city of Kawartha Lakes.

== Bibliography ==
=== Novels ===
- Family (2024, Earthling Publications, ISBN 978-1-963418-03-3)
- The Underwood, (2025, Thunderstorm Books)

=== Collections ===
- Every House Is Haunted
  - Original edition, 2012, ChiZine Publications. ISBN 978-1927469163;
  - Reprint edition, 2022, Cemetery Dance Publications. ISBN 978-1-58767-845-5)
  - Reprint edition (expanded, with 3 bonus stories), 2024, Twisted Retreat. ISBN 978-1-58767-845-5

=== Novellas ===
- Deadstock (2011, Stonebunny Press, ISBN 978-0986854712)
- Grey (2024, PS Publishing, ISBN 978-1-80394-481-4)

=== The Black Lands (series) ===
Novels

- Sycamore, (2024, Cemetery Dance Publications, ISBN 978-1587679902)

Collections

- SuperNOIRtural Tales
  - Original edition, 2012, Burning Effigy Press, ISBN 978-1926611167
  - Reprint edition, 2025, Cemetery Dance Publications, ISBN 978-1964780467

Chapbooks

- Temporary Monsters (2009, Burning Effigy Press, 40 pages, ISBN 978-1-926611-07-5)
- The Ash Angels (2010, Burning Effigy Press, 40 pages ISBN 978-1-926611-09-9)
- Black-Eyed Kids (2011, Burning Effigy Press, 60 pages ISBN 978-1-926611-13-6)

== Awards ==
=== Won ===
- ReLit Award for Short Fiction (2013): Every House Is Haunted

=== Nominated ===
- Shirley Jackson Award for Best Novelette (2012): "The House on Ashley Avenue"
- Aurora Award for Best Novelette/Novella (2021): "Go Fish"
