= Nathaniel G. Moore =

Canadian author

Nathaniel G. Moore (born July 15, 1974) is a Canadian writer whose novel Wrong Bar was shortlisted for the 2010 ReLit Awards, and novel Savage 1986-2011 won the 2014 ReLit Awards.

== Notable bibliography ==
- Bowlbrawl (2005)
- Wrong Bar (2009)
- Savage 1986-2011 (2013)
- Honorarium (2021)

== Recognition ==
Nathaniel G. Moore's 2013 book Savage 1986-2011, won the 2014 ReLit Awards for best novel.

== See also ==
- Canadian literature
- List of Canadian writers
