= Barry Webster (writer) =

Canadian writer

- Born: Toronto, Ontario
- Occupations: novelist, short stories
- Writing career
- Period: 2000s-present
- Notable works: The Sound of All Flesh, The Lava in My Bones
- Website: www.barrywebster.ca

Barry Webster (born 1961) is a Canadian writer. Originally from Toronto, Ontario, he is currently based in Montreal, Quebec.

His short story collection The Sound of All Flesh won a ReLit Award in 2006, and was a shortlisted nominee for the Hugh MacLennan Award. His short stories have also been shortlisted for the National Magazine Award.

His 2012 novel The Lava in My Bones was a finalist for the Ferro-Grumley Award and the Lambda Literary Award. In 2013 he was awarded an Honour of Distinction by the Dayne Ogilvie Prize, an award presented by the Writers' Trust of Canada.

He was a featured speaker at the 2013 Saints and Sinners Literary Festival.

He has a B.A. in English literature from the University of Toronto, and an M.A. in creative writing from Concordia University. A classically trained pianist, he has two ARCTs from the Royal Conservatory of Music. He has also occasionally worked as an actor, including in a production of Sam Shepard's play Savage/Love and in a radio adaptation of his own short story "Enough".

== Works ==
- —— (2005). The Sound of All Flesh. Porcupine's Quill. ISBN 9780889842809.
- —— (2012). The Lava in My Bones. Arsenal Pulp Press. ISBN 9781551524795.
