= Adam Dickinson =

Canadian poet

Adam Dickinson is a Canadian poet. He is most noted for his 2013 poetry collection The Polymers, which was a shortlisted finalist for the Governor General's Award for English-language poetry at the 2013 Governor General's Awards, for the 2014 ReLit Award for Poetry and for the 2014 Trillium Book Award.

A graduate of the University of Ottawa, University of New Brunswick and the University of Alberta, he teaches English literature at Brock University.

== Works ==
- Cartography and Walking (2002)
- Kingdom, Phylum (2006)
- The Polymers (2013)
- Anatomic (2018)
