= Jen Currin =

American/Canadian poet

Jen Currin is an American/Canadian poet and fiction writer. Born and raised in Portland, Oregon, they are currently based in Vancouver, British Columbia and teach creative writing at Kwantlen Polytechnic University. Their 2010 collection The Inquisition Yours won the Audre Lorde Award for Lesbian Poetry in 2011, and was shortlisted for that year's Lambda Literary Award, Dorothy Livesay Poetry Prize and ReLit Award. Their 2014 collection School was a finalist for the Pat Lowther Award, the Dorothy Livesay Prize, and a ReLit Award. Their most recent poetry collection is Trinity Street (House of Anansi, 2023).

Currin has published two prior poetry collections, The Sleep of Four Cities and Hagiography.

Their debut short story collection, Hider/Seeker, was published in 2018. It was named a Globe and Mail "Top 100" for 2018 and was shortlisted for the 2019 ReLit Award for short fiction. In 2024, Currin won the Fred Kerner Book Award for their story collection Disembark.

== Personal life ==
They earned a bachelor's degree in English from Bard College, where they studied with John Ashbery, who was their undergraduate thesis advisor. They hold an MFA in creative writing from Arizona State University.

== Works ==
- The Sleep of Four Cities (2005, Anvil Press). ISBN 1895636701.
- Hagiography (2008, Coach House Books). ISBN 9781552451977.
- The Inquisition Yours (2010, Coach House Books). ISBN 9781552452301.
- School (2014, Coach House Books). ISBN 9781770563773.
- Hider/Seeker (2018, Anvil Press). ISBN 9781772141177.
- Trinity Street (2023, House of Anansi). ISBN 9781487011628.
- Disembark (2024, House of Anansi). ISBN 9781487011895.
