= Kristyn Dunnion =

Canadian writer and performance artist

Kristyn Dunnion (born August 6, 1969) is a Canadian fiction writer and performance artist. She has published four novels and a short story collection to date. Her short fiction appears in literary journals, including Grain Magazine, The Tahoma Literary Review, and Cosmonauts Avenue, as well as in several anthologies. Dunnion is the 2015 Machigonne Fiction prize winner for the short story, "Last Call at the Dogwater Inn," published in The New Guard Volume V. For several years she performed cabaret shows under the name Miss Kitty Galore, and was the bassist in the all-female heavy metal band Heavy Filth (2008-2011). She currently plays bass in the Toronto-based rock band Bone Donor. Her more recent literary work is aimed at an adult audience, but earlier writing was primarily intended for young adult readers. Her writing incorporates aspects of science fiction, punk culture and horror literature, although she has also published several stories in anthologies of adult erotic literature.

Dunnion studied English and theatre at McGill University and the University of Guelph.

Her short story collection The Dirt Chronicles was a nominee for the 2012 Lambda Literary Awards in the category of lesbian fiction. In 2021, she won the ReLit Award for short fiction for her 2020 short story collection Stoop City.

== Works ==
=== Novels ===
- Missing Matthew (2003)
- Mosh Pit (2004)
- Big Big Sky (2008)
- Tarry This Night (2017)

=== Short story collections ===
- The Dirt Chronicles (2011)
- Stoop City (2020)

=== Anthologies ===
- Off the Record, Edited by John Metcalf, Biblioasis, 2023
- Tahoma Literary Review Issue #9 2016
- The New Guard Volume V
- subTerrain Volume 6 Issue #60
- Grain Magazine Volume 41 Number 1
- Glitterwolf halloween Special Edition
- Saints + Sinners 2015
- With a Rough Tongue: Femmes Write Porn
- Periphery: Lesbian Erotic Futures
- Fist of the Spiderwoman: Tales of Fear & Queer Desire
- Geeks, Misfits and Outlaws
- The Horrors: Terrifying Tales, Book One
