= S. D. Johnson =

Canadian poet

Sherry Johnson is a Canadian poet, who won the ReLit Award for poetry in 2001 for her collection Hymns to Phenomena.

Based in Saskatchewan, Johnson published her first poetry collection Pale Grace in 1995.

Also a film critic, Johnson has published poems and articles in journals worldwide, in Canada, the United States, Sweden, Australia and England.
