= Sean Johnston =

Canadian writer

Sean Johnston is a Canadian writer, who won the ReLit Award for short fiction in 2003 for his short story collection A Day Does Not Go By.

He has also published the novels All This Town Remembers (2006) and Listen All You Bullets (2013), the poetry collections Bull Island (2004) and The Ditch Was Lit Like This (2011), and the short story collection We Don't Listen to Them (2014).

Originally from Asquith, Saskatchewan, he lives in Kelowna, British Columbia, where he teaches English at Okanagan College.
