= Shannon Stewart (poet) =

Canadian poet

== Personal life ==
Shannon Stewart is a Canadian writer living in Vancouver, British Columbia.

== Writing ==
Stewart's first collection of poetry, The Canadian Girl, was published in 1998, and was a finalist for the Milton Acorn People's Poetry Award and Gerald Lampert Award for Best First Book of Poetry. Her second collection, Penny Dreadful, was published in 2008 and was shortlisted for a ReLit Award. One of Stewart's tabloid poems inspired by the Weekly World News tabloid was metafictively featured in its online site.

=== Poetry titles ===
- The Canadian Girl (1998) ISBN 0-88971-169-0
- Penny Dreadful (2008) ISBN 1-55065-245-1

=== Children's titles ===
- Sea Crow (2004) ISBN 1-55143-288-9
- Alphabad (2005) ISBN 1-4236-0147-5
- Captain Jake (2009) ISBN 1-55143-896-8
