= Michael Kenyon (Canadian writer) =

Canadian writer

Michael Chadwick Kenyon (born 1953) is a Canadian writer from British Columbia, who won the ReLit Award for fiction in 2010 for his novel The Beautiful Children. He was also a ReLit poetry nominee in the same year for The Last House.

His debut novel, Kleinberg, was a shortlisted finalist for the Books in Canada First Novel Award in 1992, and for the Commonwealth Writers Prize for Best First Book, Canada/Caribbean.

His other books have included the novels The Biggest Animals and A Year at River Mountain, and the short story collection Parallel Rivers.
