= Paul Carlucci =

Canadian author

Paul Carlucci (born 1981) is a Canadian author, editor, and former journalist. He is best known for his short story collections and his novel The Voyageur. He won the Danuta Gleed Literary Award for his debut collection The Secret Life of Fission.

Paul Carlucci, author and editor

== Early life and career ==
Carlucci was born in Deep River, Ontario, Canada. He began his career in journalism, working for newspapers in Canada before focusing primarily on literary fiction and editing.

== Literary work ==
Carlucci's first book, The Secret Life of Fission (2013), won the Danuta Gleed Literary Award, which recognizes the best first collection of short fiction by a Canadian author.

He later published A Plea for Constant Motion (2017), and The High-Rise in Fort Fierce (2018). His first novel, The Voyageur (2024), is a work of historical fiction.

Book Summaries

The Secret Life of Fission (2013), debut collection)

His first book of stories, drawing on the years he spent living across Canada's frontiers, from Labrador to the Northwest Territories. Reviewers describe it as dark and unsettling, told with killer pace and innovative language, using unconventional, experimental techniques to portray characters and situations that don't often find their way into short fiction. (Goodreads) It won the 2013 Danuta Gleed Literary Award for best first English-language short fiction collection by a Canadian author.

A Plea for Constant Motion (2017)

His second collection, split into two parts with a surreal intermission. The stories examine the innate desire in everyone to change their lives and strive for something better — two couples share a disastrous dinner after their children are killed in a botched kidnapping overseas, and a teacher with a passion for cartography orchestrates a bizarre apology after intentionally hitting a student. (House of Anansi Press) One notable thread follows a twelve-year-old girl, Ramona, dragged to Zambia by her godmother after her grandmother's murder for missionary work, where she's confronted with the corruption and debauchery of their hosts and her own loss of innocence. (ottawareviewofbooks) Several stories move between Canada and Africa, reflecting Carlucci's own time in Ghana and Zambia.

The High-Rise in Fort Fierce (2018)

A linked collection centered on Franklin Place, a doomed apartment tower in the fictional northern town of Fort Fierce. It traces the building's history from its Cold War-era construction to its demolition decades later, following the Franklins — three generations of increasingly paranoid, alienated landlords — and their tenants: a drug dealer, a lonely bigot, a political activist, a struggling father, a wandering sex offender, and a woman who refuses to give in. (Gooselane) Written partly while Carlucci lived in Hay River, NWT, it deals heavily with poverty, addiction, racism, and the tense relations between Indigenous and settler populations.

The Voyageur (2024, debut novel)

Historical fiction set in 1830s Quebec/Montreal. It follows Alex, a motherless stockboy waiting for his father to return from France, who falls in with Serge, a drunken fur trader promising food and safety — an arrangement that goes badly wrong. (IMAGE Magazine) The character is loosely based on the real case of Alexis St Martin, whose body was used in medical experiments by physician William Beaumont, and the novel is unflinching in its physicality. (The Irish Times) John Banville compared it to Cormac McCarthy's best work.

Writing Style

Across all four books, a few consistent threads come up in how critics and Carlucci himself describe his style.

Dark, unflinching, visceral. His work is repeatedly called disturbing, harsh, and unsparing — violence, addiction, racism, poverty, and exploitation are recurring subjects, rendered without softening. One review noted the harshness of his prose through a line about carousel horses "ridden by drunks and druggies and sniffed at by deer and pissed on by wolves." (Quill and Quire)

Experimental and unconventional technique. Reviewers note he uses unconventional, experimental literary techniques and portrays characters and situations that don't often appear in mainstream short fiction — sometimes described as innovative language told with killer pace. (Goodreads)

Tenderness amid the brutality. Despite the bleakness, critics point to moments of real warmth. One of his publishers describes the work as penetrating and visceral, yet always offset by small moments of tenderness and humour. (House of Anansi Press)

Strong sense of place. Setting does a lot of work in his fiction — Northern Canada (NWT), Zambia/Africa, 19th-century Quebec. One reviewer called the deep evocation of place and abiding pathos the strength of The High-Rise in Fort Fierce, while noting an occasional over-reliance on exposition as its weakness. (Quill and Quire)

Structural ambition. He favors linked/interlocking story structures rather than isolated pieces — Fort Fierce is a "near-novel" web of interconnected lives around one building, and Plea for Constant Motion is tripartite, with smaller wholes assembled to suggest interconnectedness. (Canadian Literature)

His own account of his themes, from an interview: he says he writes about power dynamics, class, work, certain kinds of displacement, and addiction — things he's observed up close rather than reported on from a distance, deliberately avoiding "newsier" topics like political intrigue that he has no direct experience of. (The Ex-Puritan)

One critic's shorthand for the overall effect: his writing is reminiscent of Russell Wangersky in how it portrays ordinary people rubbing against hard times or beset by loss and disillusionment, though Carlucci leans harder into "other side of the tracks" territory. (ottawareviewofbooks)

== Bibliography ==
=== Short story collections ===
- The Secret Life of Fission (2013)
- A Plea for Constant Motion (2017)
- The High-Rise in Fort Fierce (2018)

=== Novel ===
- The Voyageur (2024)

== Awards ==
- Danuta Gleed Literary Award (2013)
