= Catherine Owen (writer) =

Canadian writer

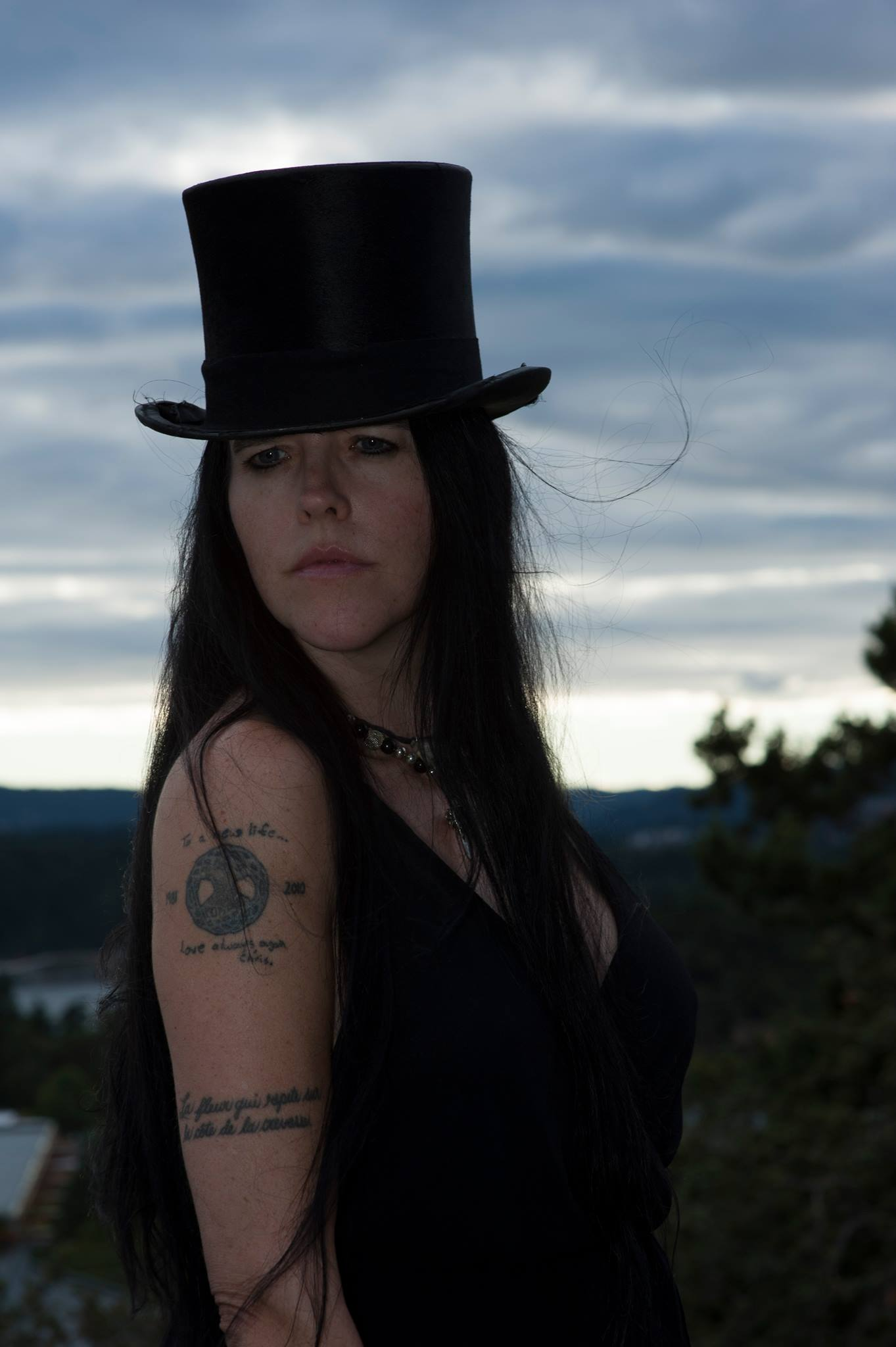
Photo of Catherine

Catherine Owen is a Canadian poet, writer, and performer.

== Early life ==
Catherine Owen, the eldest of five siblings was born and raised in Vancouver. At 11, her short story won a Catholic school writing contest. As a teenager, Owen wrote and performed public readings of her poetry. Owen currently resides in Edmonton, Alberta.

== Career ==
In 1998, her first work was published by Exile Editions. Since then, she has published a number of literary, non-fiction and poetry works. She regularly reviews poetry for Canadian publications.

Owen runs the performance series 94th Street Trobairitz, and hosts a podcast named Ms Lyric's Poetry Outlaws. She has a web series named The Reading Queen, about literature aimed at children.

== Publications ==
- The Other 23 and a Half Hours or Everything You Wanted To Know That Your MFA Didn't Teach You (Wolsak & Wynn, 2015)
- The Day of the Dead, a collection of short stories (Caitlin Press, 2016)
- Locations of Grief: an emotional geography, an anthology of Canadian grief memoirs (Wolsak & Wynn, 2020)
- The Life and Work of Egon Schiele (Exile Editions, 1998)

== Awards ==
- Stephan G. Stephansson Award for Poetry in 2010.

=== Nominations ===
- Gerald Lampert Award (1999)
- BC Book Prize (2002)
- George Ryga Award
- Re-lit Prize (2006, 2018)
- Pat Lowther Award (2018)

== Bibliography ==
1. Locations of Grief: An Emotional Geography (2020) from Wolsak & Wynn
2. Riven (2020) from ECW Press
3. Dear Ghost (2017) from Buckrider Books
4. The Day of the Dead (2016) from Caitlin Press
5. The Other 23 & a Half Hours: Or Everything You Wanted to Know that Your MFA Didn’t Teach You (2015) from Wolsak and Wynn (ISBN 9781928088004)
6. Designated Mourner (2014) from ECW Press (ISBN 9781770412033)
7. Trobairitz (2012) from Anvil Press (ISBN 978-1-897535-97-4)
8. Catalysts: Confrontations with the muse (2012) from Wolsak and Wynn (ISBN 9781894987592)
9. Seeing Lessons (2010) from Wolsak and Wynn.
10. Frenzy (2009) from Anvil Press (ISBN 9781897535004)
11. Dog (2008) from Mansfield Press (ISBN 9781894469340)
12. Fyre (2007) from Above Ground Press
13. Shall: Ghazals (2006) from Wolsak and Wynn (ISBN 189498708X)
14. Cusp/Detritus: An Experiment in Alleyways (2006) from Anvil Press (ISBN 1895636744)
15. The Wrecks of Eden (2002) from Wolsak and Wynn (ISBN 0919897800)
16. Somatic: The Life & Work of Egon Schiele (1998) from Exile Editions (ISBN 1550962345).
