= Liz Worth =

Canadian poet, author and performance artist (born 1982)

- Born: April 12, 1982 (age 44); Etobicoke, Ontario, Canada
- Occupations: Poet; author; actor
- Years active: 2006–present
- Known for: Documentation of the Canadian punk rock movement

Liz Worth (born April 19, 1982) is a Canadian poet, author and performance artist. She is noted for her documentation of the Canadian punk rock movement.

== Early life ==
Born in Etobicoke, Ontario, Worth started her first book in 2006 at age 24.

== Career ==
Her debut book, Treat Me Like Dirt: An Oral History of Punk in Toronto and Beyond'', was the first in-depth account of punk history in Toronto. It was released when Worth was 27 years old. Worth's book was at the forefront of a renewed interest in preserving the history of Canadian punk, and has been cited as a trailblazing work.

Since the publication of Treat Me Like Dirt, Worth has shifted her focus from music journalism to poetry, fiction, and performance art. In 2011, her first full-length poetry collection Amphetamine Heart was published by Guernica Editions. Worth has said that this collection reflects the mental and emotional states she was in during the book's creation. "I felt like I was collapsing in on myself," she told Proxart Magazine in 2011.

Worth has also stated that Amphetamine Heart continues in the punk tradition of crossing genres between music and literature. Her next book, PostApoc, was published by Now or Never Publishing in 2013. In 2015, Worth released No Work Finished Here. A rewriting of Andy Warhol's a, A novel. Released by Book*hug Press.

As a performance artist, Worth performs solo and as one-half of Salt Circle, a Toronto-based duo that combines spoken word, noise, and ritual and performance elements.

Fascinated with tarot from a young age, Worth has been taught tarot since 2015. She has also released two tarot books. Going Beyond The Little White Book: A Contemporary Guide To Tarot (2016) and The Power Of Tarot: To Know Tarot, Read Tarot, and Live Tarot (2019). In October 2022, she released a supernatural fiction book called The Mouth is a Coven.

In 2024, Worth published Inside Every Dream, A Raging Sea, and in 2025 she published Fog Machine Salvation: The Batcave Poems for World Goth Day.
