= Michael Blouin (writer) =

Canadian writer

- Born: Morrisburg, Ontario, Canada
- Occupations: novelist, poet, teacher
- Writing career
- Period: 2000s-present
- Notable works: Chase and Haven

Michael Blouin is a Canadian writer. His debut novel Chase and Haven was a shortlisted nominee for the amazon.ca First Novel Award in 2008 and won the ReLit Award for Best Novel in 2009 and Skin House won the same award in 2020, and his poetry collection Wore Down Trust won the Archibald Lampman Award in 2012. He has also been the recipient of the Lilian I. Found Award, and the Diana Brebner Award, and has served as adjudicator for the Canada Council for the Arts and the Ontario Arts Council.

Originally from Morrisburg, Ontario,^{[3]} Blouin currently lives in Kemptville, Ontario.^{[3]}

His 2019 novel Skin House won the 2020 ReLit Award for Best Novel.

It is included, as part of the Lunar Codex project, in the NASA/Astrobotic mission to the moon in 2024 and, along with I am Billy the Kid, successfully landed on the lunar surface on February 22, 2024 as a part of the historic NASA/Intuitive Machines/SpaceX Odysseus Mission, marking NASA's first return to the moon in fifty years. 2024 also saw the publication of the collected poetry "Hard Electric".

As of March 2023 Blouin is an instructor at the University of Toronto and a guest lecturer at Carleton University.

== Works ==
- I'm Not Going to Lie to You (2007, ISBN 978-1897141175)
- Chase and Haven (2008, ISBN 978-1552452035)
- Wore Down Trust (2011, ISBN 978-1897141403)
- I Don't Know How to Behave (2013, ISBN 978-1927040805)
- Skin House (2020, ISBN 978-1-77214-118-4)
- I am Billy the Kid (2022, ISBN 978-1-77214-188-7)
- Hard Electric (2024, ISBN 978-1772142402)
