= Damian Rogers =

American-Canadian poet, journalist, and editor

- Born: 1972 (age 53–54); Detroit, Michigan
- Education: University of Michigan
- Occupation: poet
- Writing career
- Period: 2000s-present

Damian Rogers is an American-Canadian poet, journalist, and editor.

== Life and career ==
Rogers was born in Detroit, Michigan. She received her undergraduate degree from the University of Michigan and her MFA in poetry from Bennington College, before working as an editor at the Poetry Foundation and at magazines in New York City and Toronto.

Her first book of poetry, Paper Radio, was published by ECW Press in 2009 and was nominated for a Pat Lowther Award. Her second book, Dear Leader, was published by Coach House Books in 2015. It was a finalist for the Trillium Book Award for Poetry in 2016. Her memoir An Alphabet for Joanna will be published by Knopf Canada in 2019.

Rogers is the founding creative director of Poetry in Voice, a poetry recitation competition for Canadian high school students, and the co-curator (with Jason Collett) of the Basement Revue, a Toronto music and literary event series. She has also worked as a poetry editor with House of Anansi Press and The Walrus.

She lives in Toronto with her husband, the drummer Mike Belitsky. Rogers currently teaches Creative Writing at Toronto Metropolitan University.

== Works ==
=== Poetry ===
- Paper Radio (ECW Press, 2009)
- Dear Leader (Coach House Books, 2015)
