= Sylvia Maultash Warsh =

German-born Canadian mystery writer

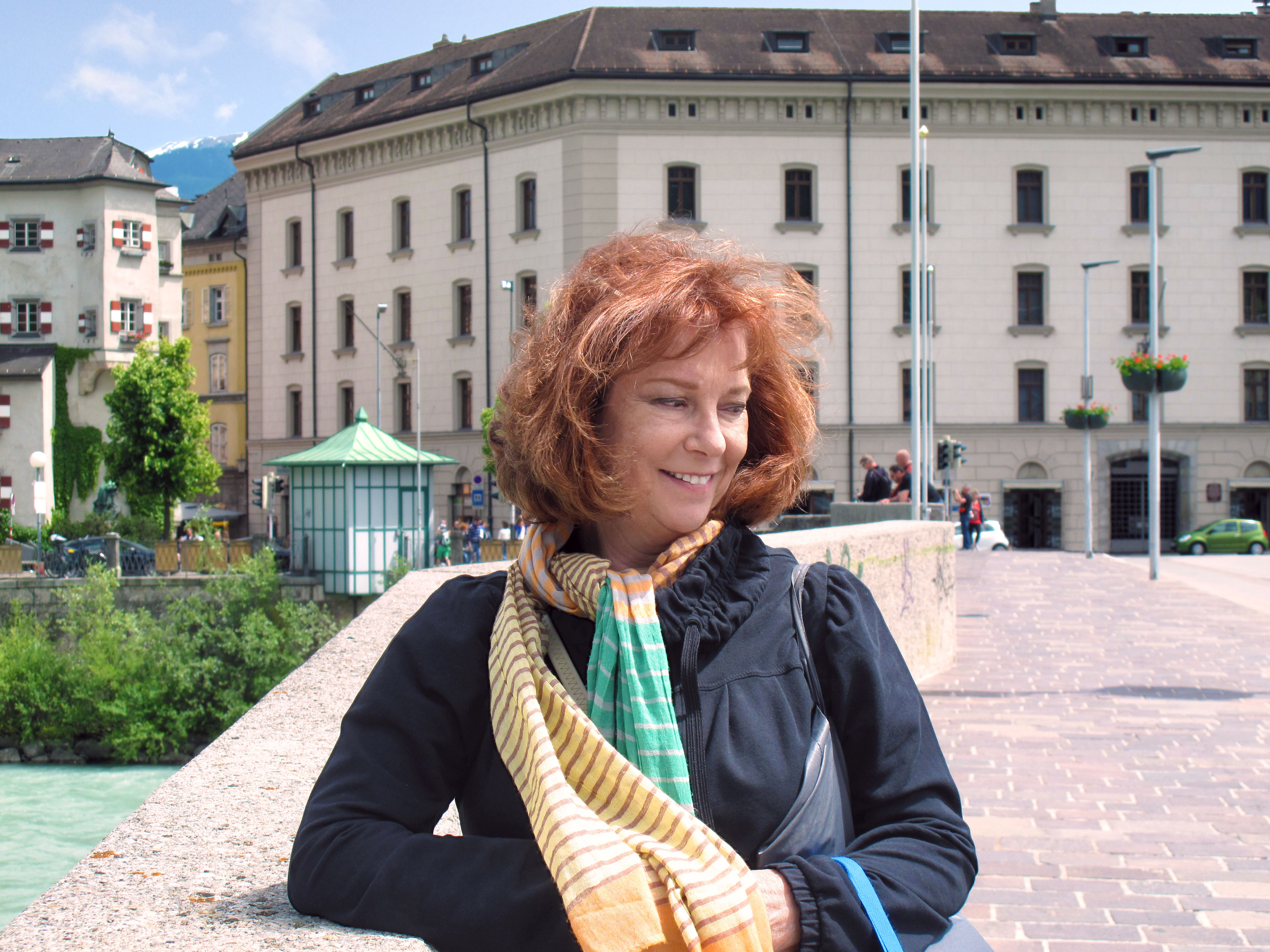
Sylvia Maultash Warsh in Innsbruck

Sylvia Maultash Warsh is a Canadian writer. The daughter of Holocaust survivors, she was born in Stuttgart, came to Canada at the age of four, settling in Toronto. She earned a Masters in Linguistics at the University of Toronto.

Warsh has written a series of mystery novels set in Toronto in 1979 whose main character is named Dr. Rebecca Temple. The first book in the series To Die in Spring, published in 2000, was on the short list for the Arthur Ellis Award. Find Me Again (2003), the second in the series, won an Edgar Award and was nominated in two categories for an Anthony Award. The third book in the series Season of Iron was published in 2006; it was nominated for a ReLit Award. All published by Dundurn Books.

In 2010, Warsh published The Queen of Unforgetting, set in Midland in the 1980s, which explores parallels between the tragic history of the Wyandot (Huron) people and the Holocaust. Project Bookmark Canada chose the novel for a plaque installed in Little Lake Park in Midland, Ontario. Published by Cormorant Press.

In 2012, she published Best Girl, a Rapid Reads novella, Orca Books.

Her short stories have appeared in many anthologies. Five stories have been nominated for Derringers and Arthurs. The latest, "Days Without Name" published in Grave Diagnosis, published by Carrick Publishing, has been shortlisted for a Crime Writers of Canada Excellence Award, 2021.

She is a member of Sisters in Crime Toronto, Crime Writers of Canada, The Writers Union of Canada, The Short Mystery Fiction Society, and The Mesdames of Mayhem.
