= Méira Cook =

Canadian poet

Méira Cook (born May 14, 1964) is a novelist and poet born in Johannesburg, South Africa, and now residing in Winnipeg, Canada.

== Academic career ==
Méira Cook received her MA from University of the Witwatersrand, South Africa, in 1988; her thesis was a Lacanian reading of short stories by Isaac Bashevis Singer, She worked as a journalist before she moved to Canada in 1991, where she enrolled at the University of Manitoba and received her PhD in Canadian Literature. Cook taught creative writing classes at the University of Manitoba, was an editor for Prairie Fire, and was the Carol Shields writer in residence at the University of Winnipeg in 2018.

== Poetry and fiction ==
In 2007 her poetry won first prize in the CBC Literary awards and then in 2008 her work was published in The Best Canadian Poetry in 2008. In 2012 her poem "The Devil's Advocate" won the inaugural Walrus Poetry Prize. In 2013 her first novel, The House on Sugarbush Road, won the McNally Robinson Book of the Year Award. Cook's Nightwatching, won the Margaret Laurence Award for Fiction.

== Works ==
- Text Into Flesh: A Lacanian Reading Of Selected Short Stories By I.B. Singer, 1992
- Fine Grammar of Bones, 1993
- Toward a Catalogue of Falling, 1996
- The Blood Girls, 1998
- Slovenly Love, 2003
- Writing Lovers: Reading Canadian Love Poetry by Women, 2005
- Field Marks: Poetry of Don Mckay, 2006
- A Walker in the City, 2011
- House on Sugarbush Road, 2012
- Monologue Dogs, 2015
- Nightwatching, 2015
- Once More with Feeling, 2017
- The Full Catastrophe, 2022

== Awards ==
- First Place Prize CBC Literary Awards in 2007
- McNally Robinson Book of the Year Award in 2013
- Inaugural Walrus Poetry Prize 2012
- Margaret Laurence Award For Fiction
