= Danila Botha =

South African-Canadian novelist and author

- Born: 14 October 1982 (age 44); Johannesburg, South Africa
- Education: York University, Humber College School of Writers
- Occupation: Author
- Writing career
- Language: English, Hebrew, Afrikaans
- Genre: Literary Fiction
- Website: www.danilabotha.com

Danila Botha is a Canadian author, a short story writer, graphic novelist, and novelist. She has published three short story collections, most recently, 2024's Things that Cause Inappropriate Happiness, and two novels, with the second, A Place for People Like Us, which was published in 2025. Her first graphic novel, Vidal, which Botha both wrote and illustrated, was published by At Bay Press in 2026.

== Personal life and work ==
Botha was born in Johannesburg, South Africa in 1982. She is Jewish, and is of Moroccan Israeli and Lithuanian Jewish descent. As well as English, she speaks Hebrew and Afrikaans. She moved to Toronto with her family as a teenager. She studied creative writing at York University, and at the Humber College School for Writers.

She volunteered with Na-me-res and Ve'ahavta, organizations benefiting the homeless, which inspired many of the short stories in Got No Secrets, her first book, published by Tightrope Books in Canada in May 2010, and Modjaji Books in South Africa in 2012. The stories, which deal with addiction, abuse, suicide, and childhood, are journeys into the private lives of twelve women.

Botha has lived in South Africa, Ra'anana, Israel and Halifax, Nova Scotia, all of which informed her character's experiences in her debut novel. Too Much on the Inside, which was published in May 2015 by Quattro Books, follows four newcomers to Toronto who struggle with their pasts, their new home and falling in love.

Too Much on the Inside was reviewed by Quill and Quire Magazine, The Literary Review of Canada, and Book Clubbish. Botha's novel was described as an "extraordinary...narrative, which... reveals a deep understanding of human nature." and writing which contains "an admirable freshness and enthusiasm." It won a Book Excellence Award for Contemporary Novel in 2016. It was also short listed for the 2016 ReLit Award, in the Novels Category. It was optioned for film or episodic series by Pelee Entertainment in 2023.

Her sophomore collection of short stories, For All the Men (and Some of the Women) I've Known, was published in October 2016 by Tightrope Books. It received a starred review in Quill and Quire Magazine, who called it her "most triumphant work to date." The Toronto Star praised her "fine talent for putting emphasis in unexpected places." while the Globe and Mail praised the stories' "admirable directness and grit". The Winnipeg Review praised her for "speaking smartly, even boldly... [and]repaint [ing] the stoic male canvasses of Cheever and Carver, but with a sensing, reflective affect" In May 2017, it was a named a finalist for the Trillium Book Award. It was also short listed for the Vine Award for Canadian Jewish Literature. It will be reissued by Guernica Editions in 2028.

Her new collection of short stories, Things That Cause Inappropriate Happiness, was published by Guernica Editions in April 2024. Stories from it have appeared in Canadian literary publications such as Humber Literary Review, the anthology Changing the Face of Canadian Literature, The Antigonish Review, Grain Magazine, Jewishfiction.net and more, as well as American and European publications The title story was nominated for a Pushcart Prize by Blank Spaces Magazine.

The collection has been praised for exhibiting "Chekhovian humanism and pulsing empathy" by the Miramichi Reader, as "compelling, highly readable and frequently relatable" by the Winnipeg Free Press, and as "full of unmatched precision...illuminat[ing] truths about the world with economy and elegance" by Open Book. The Literary Review of Canada described it as "Heartbreaking and sentimental, this collection contains elements of magical realism and eccentric, inquisitive prose" while Great Lakes Review described it as "not operat[ing] within easily identifiable parameters... it’s not the mix of drama, humour, or quirkiness of some of the characters that makes Botha's collection hard to classify...what is new or unexpected is the layer of subversiveness, a dark and satirical edge in certain narratives that goes beyond descriptions of young creatives consciously balking at conventional careers or familial expectations." It was also described as "the kind of book you read in one sitting, and then carry with you for a long, long time," by Swamp Pink magazine. It was named by The Toronto Star as one of Twenty-One Books to Put At the Top Of Your Reading List. Things that Cause Inappropriate Happiness was the winner of an Indie Reader New Discovery 2025 award for Women's Issues, in the Fiction category. It was also named one of the Miramichi Reader's best books of 2024. It was named a finalist for the Canadian Book Club Awards, (Canada's largest reader's choice awards) in the Anthology/Short Story Category. It was also named a finalist in the Next Generation Indie Book Awards in the General Fiction under 70,000 words category and was named a finalist in the Short Stories category by the National Indie Excellence Book Awards.

Her fifth book, and second novel, A Place For People Like Us was published by Guernica Editions in the fall of 2025. It received a starred review in the Foreword Reviews, who called it a "triumphant... weighty bildungsroman." It was also named one of CBC's Fiction Books We're Excited About This Fall. It was also praised by Open Book, who wrote that it "confirm[ed] ]Botha's place as one of Canada’s most perceptive and emotionally intelligent story tellers, by the Canadian Jewish News, who called it "a fast-paced page-turner that is at times thriller, romance, and bildungsroman...highly engaging, offering a fascinating character study. The Jewish Book Council praised its "demons[tration] of Botha's mastery in creating imperfect protagonists," while the Ottawa Review of Books wrote that "rarely do novels run the entire gamut of full human emotion and experience but Danila Botha has infused the plot of her excellent work with all that and more." It won an Independent Press Award for Contemporary Novel in 2026. A Place For People Like Us was also named a Finalist in the Eric Hoffer Book award, the CIPA (Collective of Independent Publishers and Authors) Book Award for Literary and Contemporary Fiction, The National Indie Excellence Awards and Next Generation Indie Book Awards.

Her sixth book and first graphic novel, Vidal, was published by At Bay Press in 2026. It was named "One of Nine Illustrated Books To Read This Summer by CBC Books" and was called "one of the most powerful, moving, and respectful Shoah narratives" by New Yorker cartoonist Ken Krimstein, and "a beautifully realized work [that] brings to life such subjects as Sephardic Jewish life and the Shoah in ways beyond words and, for that, it is essential" by Henry Chamberlain of Comics Grinder. Vidal won a Canadian Jewish Literary Award for Graphic Literature in 2026.

She holds an MFA in creative writing from the University of Guelph. She has contributed to the National Post's the Afterword, the 49th Shelf The Hamilton Review of Books and was the Writer in Residence for Open Book in September 2016. She was the 2021-2022 Writer in Residence at Toronto's Heliconian Club. She is a Creative Writing instructor at University of Toronto's School of Continuing Studies and is part of the faculty at Humber College's School for Writers Art

She lives in Toronto with her husband and kids.

== Bibliography ==
=== Short story collections ===
- Got No Secrets 2010 (Tightrope Books)
- For All the Men (and Some of the Women) I've Known 2016 (Tightrope Books)
- Things That Cause Inappropriate Happiness 2024 (Guernica Editions)
- Sleepwalking Too Close to the Fire 2027 (Guernica Editions)

=== Novels ===
- Too Much on the Inside 2015 (Quattro Books)
- A Place for People Like Us 2025 (Guernica Editions)

==== Graphic Novels ====
Vidal, 2026 (At Bay Press)
