= Marion Quednau =

Canadian author, poet and children's writer

Marion Quednau (born 1952) is a Canadian author, poet and children's writer who lives in British Columbia. Her novel, The Butterfly Chair, won the 1987 Books in Canada First Novel Award.

Born in Toronto, Ontario, she was educated at the University of Toronto. She subsequently moved to Western Canada, working for the Winnipeg Free Press and later for the feminist magazine Branching Out before settling in British Columbia.

She published the poetry collection Kissing: Selected Chronicles in 1999, for which she won the League of Canadian Poets Chapbook Award. Her 2009 poem "Paradise, Later Years" won a gold medal for The Malahat Review, as well as winning the poetry category in the Canadian National Magazine Awards in 2010. It was later the title poem for her second poetry collection, Paradise, Later Years (2018).

She has also published the children's novel The Gift of Odin (2007), and the short story collection Sunday Drive to Gun Club Road (2021). Sunday Drive to Gun Club Road was shortlisted for the ReLit Award for short fiction in 2022.
