= Jim Johnstone (poet) =

Canadian poet (born 1978)

Jim Johnstone (born 1978) is a Canadian poet and editor who trained as a reproductive physiologist. He was born in Stouffville, Ontario and is the author of seven collections of poetry.

Johnstone's work has received numerous awards including Arc Poetry Magazine's Readers' Choice Award, a CBC Literary Award, the E. J. Pratt Medal and Prize in Poetry, Matrix Magazine's Lit-Pop Award, the Ralph Gustafson Poetry Prize, and he won This Magazine's Great Canadian Literary Hunt.

Johnstone is the former editor of Misunderstandings Magazine, a literary journal he founded with Ian Williams and Vicki Sloot in 2005, and the former poetry editor for Cactus Press. He is currently the senior poetry editor at Palimpsest Press and the editor-in-chief of Anstruther Press.

== Publications ==
=== Poetry ===
- The Velocity of Escape. Guernica Editions, 2008.
- Patternicity. Nightwood Editions, 2010.
- Sunday, the locusts. Tightrope Books, 2011.
- Dog Ear. Véhicule Press, 2014.
- The Chemical Life. Véhicule Press, 2017.
- Infinity Network. Véhicule Press, 2022.
- The King of Terrors. Coach House Books, 2023.

=== Non-fiction ===
- Write, Print, Fold and Staple: On Poetry and Micropress in Canada. Gaspereau Press, 2023.
- Bait & Switch: Essays, Reviews, Conversations, and Views on Canadian Poetry. The Porcupine's Quill, 2024.
- Fast-Vanishing Speech. Gaspereau Press, 2024; with Christopher Patton & Klara du Plessis.

=== As editor ===
- The Essential Earle Birney. The Porcupine's Quill, 2014.
- The Essential D. G. Jones. The Porcupine's Quill, 2016.
- The Next Wave: An Anthology of 21st Century Canadian Poetry. Anstruther Books, 2018.
- The Anstruther Reader: Ten Years of Poems, Broadsides, and Manifestos. Anstruther Books, 2024.

=== About ===
- Proofs & Equational Love: The Poetry of Jim Johnstone. Frog Hollow Press, 2011.
