= Natalee Caple =

Canadian author of novels and poetry

Natalee Caple (born 1970 in Montreal, Quebec) is a Canadian author of novels and poetry, educated at the University of Calgary. Her 2004 book, Mackerel Sky, was distributed in the United States. In Canada, she appeared at events such as the Vancouver International Writers and Readers Festival.

== Bibliography ==
- 1997: The Appetites of Tiny Hands (above/ground press)
- 1998: The Heart is its own Reason (Insomniac Press) ISBN 1-895837-25-1
- 1999: The Plight of Happy People in an Ordinary World (House of Anansi) ISBN 0-88784-633-5
- 2000: A More Tender Ocean (Coach House Books) ISBN 1-55245-057-0
- 2002: The Notebooks: Interviews and New Fiction From Young Contemporary Authors (editor, with Michelle Berry; Anchor Canada) ISBN 0-385-65827-3
- 2004: Mackerel Sky (Thomas Allen) ISBN 0-88762-143-0
  - U.S. hardcover issue (St Martin's Press) ISBN 0-312-33024-3
- 2010: The Semiconducting Dictionary: Our Strindberg (ECW)
- 2017: The Appetites of Tiny Hands: Twentieth Anniversary Edition (above/ground press)
