= David McGimpsey =

Canadian poet and author

David McGimpsey is a Canadian poet and author, born and raised in Montreal. He is the author of the poetry collections Li'l Bastard (Coach House), Sitcom (Coach House) Hamburger Valley, California, Dogboy, Lardcake (ECW Press) as well as the critical study, Imagining Baseball: America's Pastime and Popular Culture (Indiana University Press). His book of short stories, Certifiable, was published by Insomniac Press (2004). His travel writings have appeared in The Globe and Mail and he is a frequent contributor ("Sandwich of the Month" column) to EnRoute magazine. McGimpsey is also a musician (he plays guitar and sings in the rock band Puggy Hammer) and an occasional performer of stand-up comedy.

== Writing career ==
Li'l Bastard was shortlisted for Canada's Governor General's Award. The 2015 book Asbestos Heights was the winner of the 2015 Quebec Writers' Federation A. M. Klein Poetry prize. In 2016 McGimpsey won Canadian National Magazine Awards' Poetry Gold Medal for 'The High Road'.

In a book of essays published about McGimpsey's work, Population Me: Essays on David McGimpsey, acclaimed poets and scholars examine McGimpsey's various positions on literary history, class, nationalism, humour, love and aesthetics, all of which are often mutually imbricated in McGimpsey's work.

== Academic work ==
McGimpsey has taught literature and creative writing in a part-time role at Concordia University.
