= Peter Unwin =

British writer and diplomat (1932–2026)

Peter William Unwin CMG (20 May 1932 – 24 January 2026) was a British writer and diplomat.

== Life and career ==
On 5 February 1955, as part of National Service, Unwin was commissioned into the Intelligence Corps, British Army, as a second lieutenant. On 25 September 1956, he was transferred to the Army Emergency Reserve of Officers. He was promoted to lieutenant on 18 November 1956. On 2 September 1956, Unwin had joined the Foreign Service as an Officer in Branch A.

Unwin was appointed a Companion of the Order of St Michael and St George (CMG) in the 1981 Birthday Honours.

He was Ambassador to Hungary from 1983 to 1986 and Ambassador to Denmark from 1986 to 1988. He served as Deputy Secretary General of the Commonwealth from 1989 to 1993. Having retired from the Diplomatic Service, he became an author and occasional contributor to The Times.

Unwin died on 24 January 2026, at the age of 93.

== Works ==
- Unwin, Peter (1991). Voice in the Wilderness: Imre Nagy and the Hungarian Revolution. Little, Brown. ISBN 0-356-20316-6.
- Unwin, Peter (1996). Baltic Approaches. Wilby: Michael Russell Publishing. ISBN 9780859552288.
- Unwin, Peter (1998). Hearts, Minds & Interests: Britain's Place in the World. London: Profile Books. ISBN 9781861970787.
- Unwin, Peter (2000). Where East Met West: A Central European Journey. Norwich: Michael Russell Publishing. ISBN 9780859552615.
- Unwin, Peter (2003). The Narrow Sea: Barrier, Bridge and Gateway to the World. The History of the English Channel. London: Headline Book Publishing. ISBN 9780747244363.
- Unwin, Peter (2006). 1956: Power Defied. Norwich: Michael Russell Publishing. ISBN 9780859552967.
- Unwin, Peter, ed. (2013). Newcomers' Lives: The Story of Immigrants As Told in Obituaries From The Times. Bloomsbury. ISBN 9781408186220.
