= List of Canadian short story writers =

This is a list of Canadian short story writers.

== A ==
- Gil Adamson
- Caroline Adderson
- Jean Marc Ah-Sen
- Kelley Aitken
- Donald Alarie
- André Alexis
- Nada Alic
- Lisa Alward
- Timothy J. Anderson
- Gail Anderson-Dargatz
- Vincent Anioke
- David Arnason
- Margaret Atwood
- Mona Awad

== B ==
- Arjun Basu
- Peter Behrens
- Moe Berg
- Kris Bertin
- David Bezmozgis
- Shashi Bhat
- Sandra Birdsell
- Dennis Bock
- Maxime Raymond Bock
- Andrew Boden
- Kenneth Bonert
- Adèle Bourgeois
- George Bowering
- Joseph Boyden
- Frances Boyle
- Lois Braun
- Krista Bridge
- Ernest Buckler
- Kayt Burgess
- Bonnie Burnard

== C ==
- Morley Callaghan
- Roch Carrier
- Kate Cayley
- Michael Christie
- Joan Clark
- Austin Clarke
- Lynn Coady
- Devon Code
- Matt Cohen
- Christy Ann Conlin
- Paige Cooper
- Ann Copeland
- Archie Crail
- Isabella Valancy Crawford
- Eva Crocker
- Harold F. Cruickshank
- Michael Crummey

== D ==
- Robertson Davies
- Elisabeth de Mariaffi
- Anthony de Sa
- Don Dickinson
- Kildare Dobbs
- Nina Dunic
- Norma Dunning

== E ==
- Evelyn Eaton
- Caterina Edwards
- George Elliott
- Marina Endicott
- Sharon English
- Gloria Escomel

== F ==
- M. A. C. Farrant
- Paola Ferrante
- Timothy Findley
- Stephen Finucan
- Jon Paul Fiorentino
- Anne Fleming
- Cynthia Flood
- Tess Fragoulis
- Raymond Fraser
- Kathy Friedman

== G ==
- Mavis Gallant
- Hugh Garner
- Zsuzsi Gartner
- Elyse Gasco
- Bill Gaston
- Connie Gault
- Hollay Ghadery
- Margaret Gibson
- John Patrick Gillese
- Danuta Gleed
- John Gould
- Katherine Govier
- Barbara Gowdy
- R. W. Gray
- Robert Joseph Greene
- Stephen Guppy

== H ==
- Rawi Hage
- Jane Eaton Hamilton
- Kevin Hardcastle
- Sydney Hegele
- Lee Henderson
- Lawrence Hill
- Greg Hollingshead
- Hugh Hood
- David Huebert

== I ==
- George K. Ilsley
- Dionne Irving

== J ==
- Lorna Jackson
- Mark Anthony Jarman

== K ==
- Greg Kearney
- Julie Keith
- Susan Kerslake
- W. P. Kinsella
- Greg Kramer
- Aaron Kreuter
- Kathryn Kuitenbrouwer

== L ==
- Angélique Lalonde
- Margaret Laurence
- Karen Lawrence
- Stephen Leacock
- John B. Lee
- Catherine Leroux
- Alex Leslie
- Carrianne Leung
- Norman Levine
- Billie Livingston
- Sidura Ludwig

== M ==
- Alexander MacLeod
- Alistair MacLeod
- Paul Marlowe
- Émile Martel
- Yann Martel
- Derek McCormack
- Oonah McFee
- Robert McGill
- Robin McGrath
- Stuart McLean
- Eugene McNamara
- Marianne Micros
- Lisa Moore
- Alice Munro
- Sheila Murray
- Téa Mutonji

== N ==
- Darlene Naponse
- André Narbonne
- Saleema Nawaz
- Jen Neale
- Alden Nowlan

== O ==
- Heather O'Neill

== P ==
- Fawn Parker
- Kevin Patterson
- Fred Pellerin
- Amanda Peters
- H. R. Percy
- Susan Perly
- Casey Plett

== Q ==
- Andy Quan
- Marion Quednau

== R ==
- Kenneth Radu
- Ahmad Danny Ramadan
- Zalika Reid-Benta
- Maria Reva
- Mordecai Richler
- Norrin M. Ripsman
- Spider Robinson
- Patrick Roscoe
- Rebecca Rosenblum
- Oakland Ross
- Sinclair Ross
- Stuart Ross
- Andrea Routley
- Naben Ruthnum

== S ==
- Sandra Sabatini
- Arthur Scaife
- Jasmine Sealy
- Sarah Selecky
- Carol Shields
- Mireille Silcoff
- Antanas Sileika
- Andy Sinclair
- Jaspreet Singh
- Neil Smith
- Caro Soles
- Rae Spoon
- Eva Stachniak
- Joel A. Sutherland
- Shawn Syms

== T ==
- Darcy Tamayose
- Saeed Teebi
- Souvankham Thammavongsa
- Madeleine Thien
- Matthew J. Trafford
- Catharine Parr Traill

== U ==
- Jane Urquhart

== V ==
- W.D. Valgardson
- Guy Vanderhaeghe
- Anuja Varghese

== W ==
- Tracey Waddleton
- Jack Wang
- Martin West
- Ethel Wilson

== Z ==
- Robert Zend
- Daniel Zomparelli

== See also ==
- Lists of Canadian writers
