= Trillium Book Award, English =

Canadian literary award

The following is a list of winners and nominees in English-language categories for the Trillium Book Award, a Canadian literary award presented by Ontario Creates to honour books published by writers resident in the province of Ontario. Separate awards have been presented for French-language literature since 1994; for the winners and nominees in French-language categories, see Trillium Book Award, French.

== All-genre (1994-2002) ==
Year	Author	Title	Result	Ref
1994	Donald Akenson	Conor: A Biography of Conor Cruise O'Brien; Volume 1 Narrative	Winner	
1994	Robertson Davies	The Cunning Man	Nominee	
1994	Bronwyn Drainie	My Jerusalem: Secular Adventures in the Holy City	Nominee	
1994	Douglas Fetherling	Travels by Night	Nominee	
1994	Katherine Govier	The Immaculate Conception Photography Gallery	Nominee	
1994	Christina McCall and Stephen Clarkson	Trudeau and Our Times: Volume 2, The Heroic Delusion	Nominee	
1994	Alice Munro	Open Secrets	Nominee	
1994	Oakland Ross	Guerrilla Beach	Nominee	
1994	Russell Smith	How Insensitive	Nominee	
1994	M. G. Vassanji	The Book of Secrets	Nominee	
1995	Margaret Atwood	Morning in the Burned House	Winner	
1995	Wayson Choy	The Jade Peony	Winner	
1995	George G. Blackburn	The Guns of Normandy: A Soldier's Eye View	Nominee	
1995	Judith Fitzgerald	River	Nominee	
1995	Cecil Foster	Sleep On, Beloved	Nominee	
1995	Robert Fulford	Accidental City: The Transformation of Toronto	Nominee	
1995	Barbara Gowdy	Mister Sandman	Nominee	
1995	Denis Smith	Rogue Tory: The Life and Legend of John G. Diefenbaker	Nominee	
1995	Rosemary Sullivan	Shadow Maker: The Life of Gwendolyn MacEwen	Nominee	
1995	Larry Turner and John de Visser	Rideau	Nominee	
1996	Anne Michaels	Fugitive Pieces	Winner	
1996	Dionne Brand	In Another Place, Not Here	Nominee	
1996	Matt Cohen	Last Seen	Nominee	
1996	Katherine Govier	Angel Walk	Nominee	
1996	Janette Turner Hospital	Oyster	Nominee	
1996	Ann Ireland	The Instructor	Nominee	
1996	Ann-Marie MacDonald	Fall on Your Knees	Nominee	
1996	Alice Munro	Selected Stories	Nominee	
1997	Dionne Brand	Land to Light On	Winner	
1997	Phyllis Grosskurth	Byron: The Flawed Angel	Nominee	
1997	Elizabeth Hay	Small Change	Nominee	
1997	Michael Helm	The Projectionist	Nominee	
1997	Mary Jo Leddy	At the Border Called Hope	Nominee	
1997	Paul Quarrington	The Boy on the Back of the Turtle	Nominee	
1997	John Ralston Saul	Reflections of a Siamese Twin	Nominee	
1997	The STORM Coalition	Oak Ridges Moraine	Nominee	
1998	André Alexis	Childhood	Winner	
1998	Alice Munro	The Love of a Good Woman	Winner	
1998	Barry Callaghan	Barrelhouse Kings	Nominee	
1998	Alan Cumyn	Man of Bone	Nominee	
1998	Sandra Gulland	Tales of Passion, Tales of Woe	Nominee	
1998	Michael Ondaatje	Handwriting	Nominee	
1998	Shyam Selvadurai	Cinnamon Gardens	Nominee	
1998	Linda Spalding	The Follow	Nominee	
1999	Alistair MacLeod	No Great Mischief	Winner	
1999	Stephanie Bolster	Two Bowls of Milk	Nominee	
1999	Elyse Friedman	Then Again	Nominee	
1999	Catherine Gildiner	Too Close to the Falls	Nominee	
1999	David Gilmour	Lost Between Houses	Nominee	
1999	David Layton	Motion Sickness	Nominee	
1999	Stuart Ross	Farmer Gloomy's New Hybrid	Nominee	
2000	Don Coles	Kurgan	Winner	
2000	Margaret Christakos	Charisma	Nominee	
2000	Deborah Ellis	The Breadwinner	Nominee	
2000	Dennis Lee	Bubblegum Delicious	Nominee	
2000	Nega Mezlekia	Notes from the Hyena's Belly	Nominee	
2000	David Adams Richards	Mercy Among the Children	Nominee	
2000	Darren Wershler-Henry	The Tapeworm Foundry	Nominee	
2001	Richard B. Wright	Clara Callan	Winner	
2001	Joan Barfoot	Critical Injuries	Nominee	
2001	Lee Gowan	Make Believe Love	Nominee	
2001	Robert Hough	The Final Confession of Mabel Stark	Nominee	
2001	Chris Jones	Falling Hard: A Rookie's Year in Boxing	Nominee	
2001	Alice Munro	Hateship, Friendship, Courtship, Loveship, Marriage	Nominee	
2001	Michael Redhill	Martin Sloane	Nominee	
2002	Austin Clarke	The Polished Hoe	Winner	
2002	Nino Ricci	Testament	Winner	
2002	Katherine Ashenburg	The Mourner's Dance	Nominee	
2002	Dionne Brand	Thirsty	Nominee	
2002	Claudia Dey	The Gwendolyn Poems	Nominee	
2002	Steve McCaffery	Seven Pages Missing: Volume 2	Nominee	
2002	Michael Ondaatje	The Conversations	Nominee	

== Prose (2003-present) ==
Year	Author	Title	Result	Ref
2003	Thomas King	The Truth About Stories	Winner	
2003	Di Brandt	Now You Care	Nominee	
2003	Pier Giorgio Di Cicco	The Dark Time of Angels	Nominee	
2003	Barbara Gowdy	The Romantic	Nominee	
2003	Djanet Sears	Adventures of a Black Girl in Search of God	Nominee	
2003	M. G. Vassanji	The In-Between World of Vikram Lall	Nominee	
2004	Wayson Choy	All That Matters	Winner	
2004	Shaughnessy Bishop-Stall	Down to This: Squalor and Splendour in a Big-City Shantytown	Nominee	
2004	Roo Borson	Short Journey Upriver Toward Oishida	Nominee	
2004	Catherine Bush	Claire's Head	Nominee	
2004	Jane Jacobs	Dark Age Ahead	Nominee	
2004	Alice Munro	Runaway	Nominee	
2004	Michael Winter	The Big Why	Nominee	
2005	Camilla Gibb	Sweetness in the Belly	Winner	
2005	F. T. Flahiff	Always Someone to Kill the Doves	Nominee	
2005	David Gilmour	A Perfect Night to Go to China	Nominee	
2005	Sheila Heti	Ticknor	Nominee	
2005	Stephen Lewis	Race Against Time: Searching for Hope in AIDS-Ravaged Africa	Nominee	
2005	Alayna Munce	When I Was Young & In My Prime	Nominee	
2006	Mark Frutkin	Fabrizio's Return	Winner	
2006	Anar Ali	Baby Khaki's Wings	Nominee	
2006	Dionne Brand	Inventory	Nominee	
2006	Bernice Eisenstein	I Was a Child of Holocaust Survivors	Nominee	
2006	Charlotte Gray	Reluctant Genius: Alexander Graham Bell and the Passion for Invention	Nominee	
2006	Wayne Johnston	The Custodian of Paradise	Nominee	
2007	Barbara Gowdy	Helpless	Winner	
2007	Gil Adamson	The Outlander	Nominee	
2007	Lorna Goodison	From Harvey River	Nominee	
2007	Robert Hough	The Culprits	Nominee	
2007	Dennis Lee	Yesno	Nominee	
2007	Ray Robertson	What Happened Later	Nominee	
2008	Pasha Malla	The Withdrawal Method	Winner	
2008	Kevin Connolly	Revolver	Nominee	
2008	Helen Humphreys	Coventry	Nominee	
2008	Ibi Kaslik	The Angel Riots	Nominee	
2008	Nino Ricci	The Origin of Species	Nominee	
2008	Charles Wilkins	In the Land of the Long Fingernails	Nominee	
2009	Ian Brown	The Boy in the Moon	Winner	
2009	Margaret Atwood	The Year of the Flood	Nominee	
2009	Alexandra Leggat	Animal	Nominee	
2009	Anne Michaels	The Winter Vault	Nominee	
2009	Alice Munro	Too Much Happiness	Nominee	
2009	Emily Schultz	Heaven Is Small	Nominee	
2009	Cordelia Strube	Lemon	Nominee	
2010	Rabindranath Maharaj	The Amazing Absorbing Boy	Winner	
2010	Emma Donoghue	Room	Nominee	
2010	James FitzGerald	What Disturbs Our Blood	Nominee	
2010	Ken Sparling	Book	Nominee	
2010	Paul Vermeesch	The Reinvention of the Human Hand	Nominee	
2010	Michael Winter	The Death of Donna Whalen	Nominee	
2011	Phil Hall	Killdeer	Winner	
2011	Ken Babstock	Methodist Hatchet	Nominee	
2011	David Bezmozgis	The Free World	Nominee	
2011	Tony Burgess	Idaho Winter	Nominee	
2011	Kristen den Hartog	And Me Among Them	Nominee	
2011	David Gilmour	The Perfect Order of Things	Nominee	
2012	Alice Munro	Dear Life	Winner	
2012	Tamara Faith Berger	Maidenhead	Nominee	
2012	Steven Heighton	The Dead Are More Visible	Nominee	
2012	Thomas King	The Inconvenient Indian	Nominee	
2012	Emily Schultz	The Blondes	Nominee	
2012	Linda Spalding	The Purchase	Nominee	
2013	Hannah Moscovitch	This Is War	Winner	
2013	Craig Davidson	Cataract City	Nominee	
2013	Barry Dempster	The Outside World	Nominee	
2013	Lorna Goodison	Supplying Salt and Light	Nominee	
2013	Helen Humphreys	Nocturne	Nominee	
2013	Peter Unwin	Life Without Death and Other Stories	Nominee	
2014	Kate Cayley	How You Were Born	Winner	
2014	Margaret Atwood	Stone Mattress	Nominee	
2014	Dionne Brand	Love Enough	Nominee	
2014	James King	Old Masters	Nominee	
2014	Thomas King	The Back of the Turtle	Nominee	
2014	Edmund Metatawabin and Alexandra Shimo	Up Ghost River	Nominee	
2015	Kevin Hardcastle	Debris	Winner	
2015	Lynn Crosbie	Where Did You Sleep Last Night	Nominee	
2015	Andrew Forbes	What You Need	Nominee	
2015	Robert Hough	The Man Who Saved Henry Morgan	Nominee	
2015	Janette Platana	A Token of My Affliction	Nominee	
2015	Karen Solie	The Road In Is Not the Same Road Out	Nominee	
2016	Melanie Mah	The Sweetest One	Winner	
2016	André Alexis	The Hidden Keys	Nominee	
2016	Kamal Al-Solaylee	Brown: What Being Brown in the World Today Means (To Everyone)	Nominee	
2016	Danila Botha	For All the Men (and Some of the Women) I've Known	Nominee	
2016	Leesa Dean	Waiting for the Cyclone	Nominee	
2016	Susan Holbrook	Throaty Wipes	Nominee	
2017	Kyo Maclear	Birds Art Life	Winner	
2017	Cherie Dimaline	The Marrow Thieves	Nominee	
2017	Catherine Hernandez	Scarborough	Nominee	
2017	James Maskalyk	Life on the Ground Floor	Nominee	
2017	Rebecca Rosenblum	So Much Love	Nominee	
2017	Leanne Betasamosake Simpson	This Accident of Being Lost	Nominee	
2018	Dionne Brand	The Blue Clerk	Winner	
2018	Tamara Faith Berger	Queen Solomon	Nominee	
2018	Claudia Dey	Heartbreaker	Nominee	
2018	K. D. Miller	Late Breaking	Nominee	
2018	Miriam Toews	Women Talking	Nominee	
2019	Téa Mutonji	Shut Up You're Pretty	Winner	
2019	Christina Baillie and Martha Baillie	Sister Language	Nominee	
2019	Sara Peters	I Become a Delight to My Enemies	Nominee	
2019	Zalika Reid-Benta	Frying Plantain	Nominee	
2019	Seth	Clyde Fans	Nominee	
2020	Souvankham Thammavongsa	How to Pronounce Knife	Winner	
2020	Craig Davidson	Cascade	Nominee	
2020	Farzana Doctor	Seven	Nominee	
2020	Emma Donoghue	The Pull of the Stars	Nominee	
2020	A. F. Moritz	As Far As You Know	Nominee	
2021	Ann Shin	The Last Exiles	Winner	
2021	Brian Francis	Missed Connections: A Memoir in Letters Never Sent	Nominee	
2021	Catherine Graham	Æther: An Out-of-Body Lyric	Nominee	
2021	Sydney Hegele	The Pump	Nominee	
2021	Pamela Korgemagi	The Hunter and the Old Woman	Nominee	
2022	Stuart Ross	The Book of Grief and Hamburgers	Winner	
2022	Charlie Angus	Cobalt: Cradle of the Demon Metals, Birth of a Mining Superpower	Nominee	
2022	Cliff Cardinal	Shakespeare's As You Like It: A Radical Retelling	Nominee	
2022	Kathy Friedman	All the Shining People	Nominee	
2022	Emma Healey	Best Young Woman Job Book	Nominee	
2023	Nina Dunic	The Clarion	Winner	
2023	Mike Barnes	Sleep is Now a Foreign Country: Encounters with the Uncanny	Nominee	
2023	D. A. Lockhart	North of Middle Island	Nominee	
2023	Kathryn Mockler	Anecdotes	Nominee	
2023	Zalika Reid-Benta	River Mumma	Nominee	
2024	Maurice Vellekoop	I'm So Glad We Had This Time Together	Winner	
2024	Colin Barrett	Wild Houses	Nominee	
2024	Morgan Campbell	My Fighting Family: Borders and Bloodlines and the Battles That Made Us	Nominee	
2024	Canisia Lubrin	Code Noir	Nominee	
2024	Chido Muchemwa	Who Will Bury You? And Other Stories	Nominee	
2025	Nina Dunic	Suddenly Light	Shortlist	
2025	Otoniya J. Okot Bitek	We, the Kindling	Shortlist	
2025	Saeed Teebi	You Will Not Kill Our Imagination: A Memoir of Palestine and Writing in Dark Times	Shortlist	
2025	Rick Westhead	We Breed Lions: Confronting Canada’s Troubled Hockey Culture	Shortlist	
2025	Liann Zhang	Julie Chan Is Dead	Shortlist	

== Poetry (2003-present) ==
Year	Author	Title	Result	Ref
2003	Adam Sol	Crowd of Sounds	Winner	
2003	Adam Getty	Reconciliation	Nominee	
2003	David O'Meara	The Vicinity	Nominee	
2004	Maureen Scott Harris	Drowning Lessons	Winner	
2004	Ray Hsu	Anthropy	Nominee	
2004	Rachel Zolf	Masque	Nominee	
2005	Kevin Connolly	drift	Winner	
2005	Patria Rivera	Puti/White	Nominee	
2005	Karen Solie	Modern and Normal	Nominee	
2006	Ken Babstock	Airstream Land Yacht	Winner	
2006	Adam Dickinson	Kingdom, Phylum	Nominee	
2006	Anita Lahey	Out to Dry in Cape Breton	Nominee	
2007	Rachel Zolf	Human Resources	Winner	
2007	Emily Schultz	Songs for the Dancing Chicken	Nominee	
2007	Rob Winger	Muybridge's Horse	Nominee	
2008	Jeramy Dodds	Crabwise to the Hounds	Winner	
2008	Joanne Page	Watermarks	Nominee	
2008	Adam Sol	Jeremiah	Nominee	
2009	Karen Solie	Pigeon	Winner	
2009	Susan Holbrook	Joy Is So Exhausting	Nominee	
2009	Matthew Tierney	The Hayflick Limit	Nominee	
2010	Jeff Latosik	Tiny, Frantic, Stronger	Winner	
2010	Dani Couture	Sweet	Nominee	
2010	Shane Neilson	Complete Physical	Nominee	
2010	Peter Norman	At the Gates of the Theme Park	Nominee	
2011	Nick Thran	Earworm	Winner	
2011	Helen Guri	Match	Nominee	
2011	Jacob McArthur Mooney	Folk	Nominee	
2012	Matthew Tierney	Probably Inevitable	Winner	
2012	Mathew Henderson	The Lease	Nominee	
2012	Sandy Pool	Undark: An Oratorio	Nominee	
2013	Souvankham Thammavongsa	Light	Winner	
2013	Austin Clarke	Where the Sun Shines Best	Nominee	
2013	Adam Dickinson	The Polymers	Nominee	
2014	Brecken Hancock	Broom Broom	Winner	
2014	Aisha Sasha John	THOU	Nominee	
2014	Deanna Young	House Dreams	Nominee	
2015	Soraya Peerbaye	Tell	Winner	
2015	Madhur Anand	A New Index for Predicting Catastrophes	Nominee	
2015	Damian Rogers	Dear Leader	Nominee	
2016	Meaghan Strimas	Yes or Nope	Winner	
2016	Laurie D. Graham	Settler Education	Nominee	
2016	Dane Swan	A Mingus Lullaby	Nominee	
2017	Pino Coluccio	Class Clown	Winner	
2017	Puneet Dutt	The Better Monsters	Nominee	
2017	Phoebe Wang	Admission Requirements	Nominee	
2018	Robin Richardson	Sit How You Want	Winner	
2018	Gwen Benaway	Holy Wild	Nominee	
2018	Stevie Howell	I left nothing inside on purpose	Nominee	
2019	Roxanna Bennett	Unmeaningable	Winner	
2019	Doyali Islam	heft	Nominee	
2019	Matthew Walsh	these are not the potatoes of my youth	Nominee	
2020	Jody Chan	Sick	Winner	
2020	Irfan Ali	Accretion	Nominee	
2020	Canisia Lubrin	The Dyzgraphxst	Nominee	
2021	Bardia Sinaee	Intruder	Winner	
2021	Roxanna Bennett	The Untranslatable I	Nominee	
2021	Liz Howard	Letters in a Bruised Cosmos	Nominee	
2022	Sanna Wani	My Grief, the Sun	Winner	
2022	Madhur Anand	Parasitic Oscillations	Nominee	
2022	Laurie D. Graham	Fast Commute	Nominee	
2023	A. Light Zachary	More Sure	Winner	
2023	Britta Badour	Wires That Sputter	Nominee	
2023	Catriona Wright	Continuity Errors	Nominee	
2024	Jake Byrne	DADDY	Winner	
2024	Faith Arkorful	The Seventh Town of Ghosts	Nominee	
2024	Matthew Walsh	Terrarium	Nominee	
2025	Farah Ghafoor	Shadow Price	Shortlist	
2025	Canisia Lubrin	The World After Rain	Shortlist	
2025	Hajer Mirwali	Revolutions	Shortlist	
