= Joyland =

Joyland may stand for:

== Places ==
- Joyland (Lahore), a theme park in Lahore, Punjab
- Joyland (Great Yarmouth), children's amusement park in Great Yarmouth
- Joyland Beach, Ontario, a small community in Ramara Township, Ontario
- World Joyland, a theme park in China

=== United States ===
- Joyland, Arkansas, a small town in Arkansas
- Joyland (Atlanta), a neighborhood of southeast Atlanta, Georgia
- Joyland, Lexington, a neighborhood in Lexington, Kentucky
- Joyland, North Carolina, a community annexed by the city of Durham, North Carolina
- Joyland Amusement Park, a theme park in Lubbock, Texas
- Joyland Amusement Park (Wichita, Kansas), a former amusement park in Wichita, Kansas
- Joyland Park, Arkansas, a small community in Arkansas

== Art, entertainment and music ==
- "Joyland", a song on the 2003 album Get What You Need by The Undertones
- Joyland (Andy McKee album), 2010
- Joyland (Trust album), 2014
- Joyland (film), a 2022 Pakistani film
- Joyland Festival, a music festival held in Indonesia

== Literature ==
- Joyland (Schultz novel), a 2005 novel by Emily Schultz
- Joyland (magazine), established 2008, an international literary magazine
- Joyland (King novel), a 2013 novel by Stephen King
