= 2026 Governor General's Awards =

Canadian literary award

The shortlisted nominees for the 2026 Governor General's Awards for Literary Merit were announced on October 28, 2026, and the winners were announced on November 12.

== English ==
Category	Winner	Nominated
Fiction	Kate Cayley, Property	Sharon Bala, Good Guys; Nina Dunic, Suddenly Light; Kim Fu, The Valley of Vengeful Ghosts; Sara Peters, Mother of God
Non-fiction	Trina Moyles, Black Bear: A Story of Siblinghood and Survival	Greg Mercer, The Lobster Trap: The Global Fight for a Seafood on the Brink; Adrian Sutherland, The Work of Our Hands: A Cree Meditation on the Real World; Saeed Teebi, You Will Not Kill Our Imagination: A Memoir of Palestine and Writing in Dark Times; Miriam Toews, A Truce That Is Not Peace
Poetry	Gillian Sze, An Orange, a Syllable	Brandi Bird, Pitiful; Kaie Kellough, Interposition; Canisia Lubrin, The World After Rain; Julie Roorda, Castastrophilia
Drama	Jordan Tannahill, Prince Faggot	Leanna Brodie and Jovanni Sy, Salesman in China; Susanna Fournier, Pyper; Hannah Moscovitch, Red Like Fruit
Children's literature	Kristy Jackson, Touching Grass	Philippa Dowding, The Love Song of Mr. Byrd; Michelle Kadarusman, Seabird; David A. Robertson, The World's End; Jordyn Taylor, The Rebel Girls of Rome
Children's illustration	Matthew Forsythe, Aggie and the Ghost	Andrew Larsen, Bells Larsen and Tallulah Fontaine, Call Me Gray; José Lourenço and James Braithwaite, Billie Builds a Robocorn; Kyo Maclear and Julie Morstad, A Door Is to Open; Todd Stewart, Little Moments in a Big Universe
French to English translation	Katia Grubisic, Together By the Sea (Marie-Claire Blais, Une réunion près de la mer)	Jonathan Kaplansky, The Origin of the Future (Francis Catalano, L'Origine du futur); Jonathan Kaplansky, The Love of Man (Hélène Rioux, L'Amour des hommes); Rhonda Mullins, When Water Became Blue (Anaïs Barbeau-Lavalette, Femme fleuve); Neil Smith, All Kidding Aside (Jean-Christophe Réhel, La Blague du siècle)

== French ==
Category	Winner	Nominated
Fiction	Alex Thibodeau, Comme les éclipses	Virginie Chaloux-Gendron, Tout cela m'appartient; Charlotte Gosselin, La glace part en morceaux; Gabriel Marcoux-Chabot, Godpèle; Sarah McNeil, Pathologique
Non-fiction	Dalie Giroux, Penser croche	Nicholas Dawson, Vida, Journal de la peur; Jean-Frédéric Légaré-Tremblay, Le spleen d’Oulan-Bator; Catherine Joncas and Yves Sioui Durand, Ondinnok. Le désir secret de l’âme; Anouk Sugàr, Sur l'errance
Poetry	Vincent Lambert, Le Royaume des chuchotements	Martine Audet, À toute heure; Elissa Kayal, Histoire de ma gueule; Stéfanie Tremblay, Cinéma; Marie-Hélène Voyer, Précieux sang
Drama	Hoda Adra, L'histoire de comment je me suis séparée en deux	François Édouard Bernier, Dany Boudreault, Maxime Carbonneau, Sébastien David, Christian Fortin, Célia Gouin-Arsenault, Joephillip Lafortune and Matéo Pineault, Corps fantômes; Stéphanie Labbé, Après t’avoir bordé tendrement, je meurs; Marie-Christine Lê-Huu, Faon; Stephie Mazunya, Chronologies
Children's literature	Maude Ménard-Dunn, Comment convaincre un fantôme de déménager	Maude Nepveu-Villeneuve, Les différences invisibles; Eveline Payette, Un don du ciel; Jean-Christophe Réhel, Au chevet de la lumière; Uashteskun, Un roi sans couronne
Children's illustration	Orbie, À l'enVERRE	Éric Dupont and Mathilde Cinq-Mars, Nos poissons; Alizée Goulet and Laurence Goulet-Tremblay, Minuit sonne et farandole; Eve Patenaude, Fleurs de verre; Erika Soucy and Geneviève Bigué, La maison cachette
English to French translation	Catherine Ego, La saignée. Enquête sur l’endométriose et la misogynie médicale ordinaire (Tracey Lindeman, Bleed: Destroying Myths and Misogyny in Endometriosis Care)	Vicky Bernard, Le trou dans le ciel (Liz Howard, Letters in a Bruised Cosmos); Jeannot Clair, Jungle (Eugene Marten, Jungle); Daniel Grenier, La lune des feuilles rouges (Waubgeshig Rice, The Moon of the Turning Leaves); Sophie Voillot, Seule la peur est bleue (Martha Baillie, There Is No Blue)
