= Zak Jones (disambiguation) =

Zak Jones may refer to:

- Zak Jones, an Australian footballer
- Zak Jones (field hockey), a British field hockey coach
- Zak Jones (writer), an American-Canadian writer
