= Denise Ryan =

Denise Ryan may refer to:

- Denise Ryan, participant in an Irish reality television series Operation Transformation
- Denise Ryan, writer of popular fiction RBC Bronwen Wallace Award for Emerging Writers runner up
