= Moez Surani =

Canadian poet and artist

- Born: April 10, 1979 (age 47); Toronto, Ontario, Canada
- Occupation: Poet
- Writing career
- Language: English
- Notable works: Operations; Heresies
- Notable awards: Chalmers Arts Fellowship; MacDowell Fellow
- Website: www.moezsurani.com

Moez Surani (born April 10, 1979) is a Canadian poet and artist. He is the author of the poetry collections Reticent Bodies and Floating Life, and the booklength poem عملية Operación Opération Operation 行动 Операция. His fourth book is titled Are the Rivers in Your Poems Real. Surani is the nephew of developmental biologist Azim Surani.

== Career ==
Poems from Surani's debut collection, Reticent Bodies, began appearing in 2001, when Canadian poet Todd Swift published the anthology 100 Poets Against the War. Surani's "Realpolitik," initially published under the pseudonym "d.m.," was selected as part of this critique of the Iraq War. In 2001, he won the Kingston Literary Award and Queen's University's richest writing prize, the Helen Richards Campbell Memorial Scholarship for excellence in creative writing. From 2002 to 2008, his poetry was published in Canada and abroad. The Dublin Quarterly selected his poem "Alley Dolle" as their choice for their 2005 poem of the year, citing its "movement and music."

Reticent Bodies was published in fall, 2009. Poet and critic Jacob McArthur Mooney stated that the book is a return to the Canadian romantic mode of Leonard Cohen and Irving Layton. In the Journal of Canadian Poetry, another review praised the book for its expressiveness.

In 2008, Surani received a Chalmers Arts Fellowship to visit his ancestral homelands, India and East Africa. During this trip, Surani wrote "Kilimanjaro Journal" and the poem "Are the Rivers in Your Poems Real," which won the Antigonish Review's Great Blue Heron Poetry Prize in 2010. That award's jury citation states that the poem "dramatizes the tension between the world of the collective myth and poetic imagination on the one hand and individual experience and empirical decision on the other."

Surani's second poetry collection, Floating Life, was published in spring, 2012. The book's themes have been characterized as travel, "connections made and left behind, and, above all, the fleeting nature of experience." In interview, Surani said that Floating Life's prevailing theme is a divestment of personal power.

Surani's poem "It All Keeps" was included in Best Canadian Poetry 2013 and "Poems to be Performed by kevin mcpherson eckhoff (with or without a Green Elfin Mask)" was included in Best Canadian Poetry 2014.

In 2014, Surani exhibited a work in progress, عملية Operación Opération Operation 行动 Операция. This poem collects together the names of military operations by 192 UN-member countries from the founding of the United Nations to the present.

In 2018, Surani and Canadian artist Nina Leo exhibited two scents, My Hiroshima and My Waco in the custom scent work, Heresies. In 2018, Surani and Leo also exhibited The Irrefutable Border: China Series.

In 2019, Surani was awarded a MacDowell Colony fellowship.

Surani has defined poetry as "the residue of living."

== Poetry ==
- Reticent Bodies (2009)
- Floating Life (2012)
- عملية Operación Opération Operation 行动 Операция (2016)
- Are the Rivers in Your Poems Real (2019)

== Fiction ==
- The Legend of Baraffo (2023)

== Art ==
- Heresies (2018)
- The Irrefutable Border: China Series (2018)
- The Irrefutable Border: Canada Series (2021)
- Was Yesterday So Much Better Than Today? (2021)
- Summa (2023)
