= Joseph Jomo Pierre =

Canadian actor and playwright

- Born: Trinidad and Tobago
- Other name: Joseph Pierre
- Occupations: Actor, playwright
- Known for: Shakespeare's Nigga

Joseph Jomo Pierre, also credited as Joseph Pierre, is a Trinidadian-Canadian actor and playwright. He is best known for his 2013 play Shakespeare's Nigga, a play which explored racism by recontextualizing two Moorish characters from the plays of William Shakespeare, Aaron from Titus Andronicus and Othello from Othello, as slaves actually owned by Shakespeare in real life. The play was a shortlisted nominee for the Governor General's Award for English-language drama at the 2013 Governor General's Awards. His prior plays include Born Ready, BeatDown and Pusha-Man, all of which were published by Playwrights Canada Press in the anthology BeatDown: Three Plays in 2006.

As an actor, he is best known for roles as Edward Forrest in Intelligence and as nurse Jackson Wade in Saving Hope, and appeared in supporting roles in the films Take the Lead, Redemption: The Stan Tookie Williams Story and Get Rich or Die Tryin'.

== Plays ==
- Born Ready a.k.a. Black on Both Sides (2006)
- BeatDown a.k.a. Life (2006)
- Pusha-Man a.k.a. The Seed (2006)
- Shakespeare's Nigga (2013)
