= How to Pronounce Knife =

2020 short story collection by Souvankham Thammavongsa

- Author: Souvankham Thammavongsa
- Publisher: McClelland & Stewart
- Publication date: April 7, 2020
- Awards: Scotiabank Giller Prize (2020); Trillium Book Award, English (2021)
- ISBN: 9780771094613

How to Pronounce Knife is a short story collection by Souvankham Thammavongsa, published in 2020 by McClelland & Stewart. The stories in the collection centre principally on the experiences of Laotian Canadian immigrant families, sometimes from the perspective of children observing the world of adults.

The collection won the 2020 Giller Prize and the 2021 Trillium Book Award for English Prose.

== Table of contents ==
1. How to Pronounce Knife
2. Paris
3. Slingshot
4. Randy Travis
5. Mani Pedi
6. Chick-A-Chee!
7. The Universe Would Be So Cruel
8. Edge of the World
9. The School Bus Driver
10. You Are So Embarrassing
11. Ewwrrrkk
12. The Gas Station
13. A Far Distant Thing
14. Picking Worms

== Critical reception ==
How to Pronounce Knife was generally well-received by critics, including a starred reviews Booklist, who wrote, "These stories have a quiet brilliance in their raw portrayal of the struggle to find meaning in difficult times and to belong in a foreign place. Thammavongsa writes with an elegance that is both brutal and tender, giving her stories and their characters a powerful voice."

Writing for Shelf Awareness, Alice Martin called the prose "spare" and "precise," saying its "syntactical simplicity [...] throws the internal complexity of these characters and their situations into stark relief, displaying how restraint can pack an unexpectedly sentimental punch."

The jurors for the Giller Prize said the collection is "a stunning collection of stories that portray the immigrant experience in achingly beautiful prose. The emotional expanse chronicled in this collection is truly remarkable. These stories are vessels of hope, of hurt, of rejection, of loss and of finding one's footing in a new and strange land. Thammavongsa's fiction cuts to the core of the immigrant reality like a knife--however you pronounce it."

Publishers Weekly called the collection "sharp," "elegant," and "potent," and Kirkus Reviews referred to it as "moving, strange, and occasionally piercing." It was included by Globe and Mail into their Globe 100 book list for year 2020.

== Awards ==
Awards for How to Pronounce Knife
| Year | Award | Result | Ref. |
|---|---|---|---|
| 2020 | National Book Critics Circle Award for Fiction | Finalist | |
| 2020 | Scotiabank Giller Prize | Winner | |
| 2021 | Danuta Gleed Literary Award | Runner-Up | |
| 2021 | PEN Open Book Award | Finalist | |
| 2021 | Trillium Book Award, English | Winner | |
