= Trina Moyles =

Trina Moyles is a Canadian writer, originally from Peace River, Alberta, and currently based in Yukon. She is most noted for her book Black Bear: A Story of Siblinghood and Survival, which won the Governor General's Award for English-language non-fiction at the 2026 Governor General's Awards.

The book was also a shortlisted finalist for the Hilary Weston Writers' Trust Prize for Nonfiction.

Her first book, Lookout: Love, Solitude, and Searching for Wildfire in the Boreal Forest, was published in 2021. Her writing has also appeared in publications including The Walrus, The Tyee and The Globe and Mail.
