= Souvankham Thammavongsa =

Canadian poet and short story writer (born 1978)

- Born: 1978 (age 47–48); Nong Khai, Thailand
- Occupation: Writer
- Writing career
- Period: 2000s–present
- Notable work: How to Pronounce Knife
- Website: souvankham-thammavongsa.com

Souvankham Thammavongsa is a Laotian-Canadian poet and author. In 2019, she won an O. Henry Award for her short story "Slingshot", in 2020 her short story collection How to Pronounce Knife won the Giller Prize, and her debut novel Pick a Colour won the 2025 Giller Prize.

== Early life and education ==
Thammavongsa was born in the Lao refugee camp in Nong Khai, Thailand, in 1978. She and her parents were sponsored for emigration by a family in Canada when she was one year old. She was raised and educated in Toronto, Ontario. Thammavongsa studied at the University of Toronto, majoring in English literature.

== Career ==
Her first book, Small Arguments, won a ReLit Award in 2004. Her second book, Found, was made into a short film by Paramita Nath. Her third book, Light, won the Trillium Book Award for Poetry in 2014. Her short story "How to Pronounce Knife" was a finalist for the 2015 Commonwealth Short Story Prize. In 2016, two of her stories, "Mani Pedi" and "Paris", were longlisted for the Journey Prize.

Her first short story collection, How to Pronounce Knife, was published in 2020. In the book's fourteen stories, she draws upon her childhood as the daughter of Laotian immigrants to explore themes of foreignness and belonging. Writer Kerryn Goldsworthy said of the stories that "their language is economical but they are emotional timebombs." The book won the Giller Prize in November 2020. In 2021, the book was awarded the Trillium Book Award and was a finalist for the Danuta Gleed Literary Award.

Thammavongsa was a judge for the 2021 Griffin Poetry Prize. She was guest editor for Biblioasis' Best Canadian Poetry 2021 anthology and in 2024 was the judge for the inaugural Montreal Fiction Prize.

Her debut novel Pick a Colour won the 2025 Giller Prize.

She is a creative writing mentor at the University of Toronto.

== Bibliography ==
=== Novels ===
- Pick A Colour (Knopf Canada, 2025)

=== Poetry collections ===
- Small Arguments (Pedlar Press, 2003)
- Found (Pedlar Press, 2007)
- Light (Pedlar Press, 2013)
- Cluster (McClelland & Stewart, 2019)

=== Edited anthologies ===
- Best Canadian Poetry 2021 (Biblioasis, 2021)

=== Short story collections ===
- How to Pronounce Knife (McClelland & Stewart, Bloomsbury 2020)
- Crush (Knopf Canada, Bloomsbury 2027)

=== Poems ===
Year	Title	First published
2000	"The Weed Woman"	Grain
2002	"Portrait of a Palm Closing"	The Fiddlehead, no. 211
2003	"Water"	Contemporary Verse 2, vol. 25 no. 3
2003	"A Firefly"	Ricepaper, vol. 8 no. 2
2003	"Poem for the Rain"	The Malahat Review, no. 142
2003	"the weight of salt on palm"	Prairie Fire, vol. 24, no. 4
2006	"The Turtle"	dANDelion, vol. 32 no. 1
2007	"The Heart"	This Magazine
2012	"Dream"	The Fiddlehead, no. 252
2013	"Lightning Storm Seen From the Window of an Airplane"	The Rusty Toque
2013	"Perfect"	Event, vol. 41 no. 3
2013	"Colossal Squid"	Windsor Review, vol. 46 no. 1
2013	"The Fish in Mammoth Cave"	Windsor Review, vol. 46 no. 1
2013	"A Sparkle-Scale Sunrise"	Windsor Review, vol. 46 no. 1
2013	"Fie"	Canadian Literature, no. 216
2014	"Birds, a Description of Them in the Sky"	Contemporary Verse 2, vol. 37 no. 1
2014	"Mountain Ash"	Contemporary Verse 2, vol. 37 no. 1
2014	"Joule"	Contemporary Verse 2, vol. 37 no. 1
2014	"North"	The Goose, vol. 13 no. 1
2014	"The Venus Flytrap"	The Goose, vol. 13 no. 1
2015	"We Have Always Lived With Mice"	Hart House Review
2015	"Pregnant"	Room, vol. 38 no. 1
2015	"Cluster"	The Globe and Mail
2015	"Gayatri"	The Walrus

=== Short fiction ===
Year	Title	First published
2014	"Bitter Melon"	Columbia
2014	"Can I Have That One?"	Grain, vol. 42 no. 1
2015	"Ewwrrrkk"	Joyland
2015	"Mani Pedi"	The Puritan, no. 30
2015	"Rice Paper"	Ricepaper
2015	"Chick-A-Chee!"	Postcolonial Text, vol. 10 no. 3/4
2015	"The Ajahn"	This Magazine
2015	"Charcoal"	Prairie Fire
2016	"The School Bus Driver"	Noon
2017	"How to Pronounce Knife"	Granta, no. 141
2018	"Slingshot"	Harper's Magazine
2019	"The Gas Station"	The Paris Review, no. 228
2020	"Edge of the World"	The Atlantic
2021	"Good-looking"	The New Yorker, vol. 97 no. 2
2022	"Trash"	The New Yorker
2024	"Bozo"	The New Yorker
2024	"Pick a Colour"	The Walrus
