= Garth Martens =

Canadian poet

- Occupation: poet
- Writing career
- Period: 2010s–present
- Notable work: Prologue for the Age of Consequence

Garth Martens is a Canadian poet. He was the winner of the Bronwen Wallace Memorial Award in 2011, and his debut collection Prologue for the Age of Consequence, published by House of Anansi Press, was a shortlisted nominee for the Governor General's Award for English-language poetry at the 2014 Governor General's Awards. In 2018, his chapbook Remediation was published with JackPine Press. It features artwork by Calgary-based artist Chelsea Rushton.

In 2017, Martens co-founded Palabra Flamenco. This flamenco cuadro combines flamenco music and dance with English-language poetry and storytelling. Palabra Flamenco is artistic director and dancer Denise Yeo, guitarist Gareth Owen, and singer Veronica Maguire. In addition to his poems, Martens also provides palmas accompaniment. As of 2018, Palabra Flamenco has performed at the Victoria Flamenco Festival, Victoria Fringe Festival, Victoria Festival of Authors, and the Vancouver Fringe Festival, for a total of sixteen performances of their 60-minute show La Palabra en el Tiempo.

Originally from Kelowna, British Columbia, Martens currently resides in Victoria. He is a graduate in creative writing from the University of Victoria. Martens has also served on the editorial board of The Malahat Review, and both on the board of directors for Open Space Arts Society and as literary coordinator for the artist-run centre's Open Word: Readings & Ideas series.

== Works ==
- Prologue for the Age of Consequence (House of Anansi Press, 2014) — ISBN 9781770893191
- Who Else in the Dark Headed There (Biblioasis, 2026) — ISBN 9781771967082
