= James G. Patterson =

American politician from Mississippi

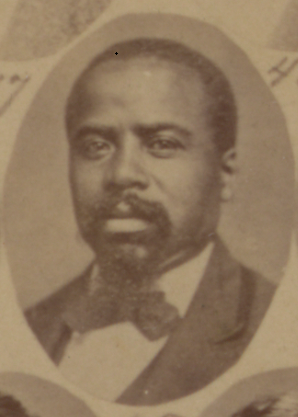

James G. Patterson was a teacher and state legislator in Mississippi. He represented Yazoo County in the Mississippi House of Representatives 1874–1875. On October 20, 1875, amidst a wave of political violence, he was lynched.

== See also ==
- Mississippi Plan
- African American officeholders from the end of the Civil War until before 1900
