= A. Light Zachary =

Canadian poet

A. Light Zachary is a Canadian poet, originally from Grande-Digue, New Brunswick, and currently based in Toronto, Ontario. They are most noted for their 2023 poetry collection More Sure, which was the winner of the Trillium Book Award for English poetry in 2024.

The book was also shortlisted for the 2024 Gerald Lampert Award, and the 2024 Stonewall Book Award.

They previously published the novel The End, by Anna in 2016.
