= Leanna Brodie =

Canadian actress and playwright

Leanna Brodie is a Canadian actress and playwright.

== Published writings ==
- Brodie, Leanna (2002). The Vic. Talonbooks. ISBN 0-88922-459-5. (play)
- Brodie, Leanna (2004). For Home and Country. Talonbooks. ISBN 0-88922-508-7. (play)
- Brodie, Leanna (2007). Schoolhouse. Talonbooks. ISBN 978-0-88922-571-8. (play)
- The Book of Esther Brodie, Leanna Talonbooks 2012
- Salesman in China - 2023, with Jovanni Sy

== Unpublished writings ==
- Invisible City. Broadcast by CBC Radio. 2001.
- One Woman, One Child. 2002.

== Awards ==
Salesman in China was a shortlisted finalist for the Governor General's Award for English drama at the 2026 Governor General's Awards.

== Performances ==
- 2020, Red Phone, Boca del Lupo Theatre, live interactive project
- 2010, The Vic, Vancouver B.C Premiere, Produced by Terminal Theatre and Directed by Sarah Szloboda
- 2000, The Vic, Cahoots Theatre Projects and Theatre Passe Muraille Toronto
