= Pamela Korgemagi =

Pamela Korgemagi is a Canadian writer, whose debut novel The Hunter and the Old Woman was published in 2021. A graduate of the creative writing program at York University, she lives and works in Toronto, Ontario.

The novel centres on the "Old Woman", a wild cougar who is being hunted by Joseph, a man from the nearby town who has been obsessed with hunting down the old woman since childhood, and alternates between both the hunter's and the cougar's perspectives.

The novel was a shortlisted finalist for the Trillium Book Award for English Prose in 2022. La Promesse du chasseur, a French translation by Gabrielle Filteau-Chiba, was published in 2023.
