= Jovanni Sy =

Canadian actor

Jovanni Sy is a Canadian actor, playwright and theatre director.

== Background ==
Of Chinese Filipino descent, he was born in Manila and grew up in Toronto, Ontario after emigrating to Canada with his family in childhood. He studied engineering at the University of Toronto, while active in community theatre as a hobby, but after not being satisfied in his early engineering career he left the profession and decided to pursue acting professionally.

== Acting career ==
He began his career as an actor in the 1990s, principally in stage roles but also in film and television including a regular role as Dr. Donald Chen in the medical drama Side Effects, and an episode of the 2003 short-run drama anthology series The Atwood Stories.

== Playwriting and theatre direction ==
He subsequently joined Factory Theatre's Playwrights Lab in 2001, spending three years with the program before joining Tapestry Opera as playwright-in-residence in 2005. He served as artistic director of Toronto's Cahoots Theatre from 2004 to 2009, and as playwright-in-residence at the Stratford Festival in 2010. During his time with Cahoots, he premiered his debut play The Five Vengeances.

In 2010 he premiered the play A Taste of Empire, in a production directed by Guillermo Verdecchia. The play was a Dora Mavor Moore Award nominee for Best Original Play, Independent Theatre in 2011.

In 2012 he was named artistic director of Gateway Theatre in Vancouver, remaining with the company until 2019. During this time he premiered the play Nine Dragons in 2018, in a staging co-produced by Gateway, Vertigo Theatre and the Royal Manitoba Theatre Centre. The play won various awards including a Jessie Richardson Theatre Award for Outstanding Original Script, and a Winnipeg Theatre Award for Outstanding New Work.

Following his time with Gateway Theatre, Sy opted to return to school to pursue an MFA in theatre at the University of Calgary, graduating in 2023. During this time, The Five Vengeances received a new staging in Vancouver by the Affair of Honor theatre company.

Salesman in China, a play he cowrote with his wife Leanna Brodie about Arthur Miller's 1983 production of Death of a Salesman in China, premiered at Stratford in 2024. Following its print publication, it was a shortlisted finalist for the Governor General's Award for English drama at the 2026 Governor General's Awards.

The Tao of the World, a contemporary Asian Canadian adaptation of William Congreve's 1700 play The Way of the World which was written as his master's thesis play, received its first professional staging at Stratford in 2026.
