= Matthew Walsh (writer) =

Canadian poet

Matthew Walsh is a Canadian poet, originally from Nova Scotia and currently based in Toronto, Ontario.

Their debut book, these are not the potatoes of my youth, was published in 2019, and was shortlisted for the Gerald Lampert Award and the Trillium Book Award for English Poetry in 2020.

They followed up in 2024 with Terrarium, which was shortlisted for the Trillium Book Award for English Poetry in 2025.
