= Faith Arkorful =

Canadian writer

Faith Arkorful is a Canadian writer from Toronto, Ontario, whose debut poetry collection The Seventh Town of Ghosts was published in 2024.

The book was shortlisted for several literary awards in 2025, including the Gerald Lampert Award, the Pat Lowther Award, and the Trillium Book Award for English Poetry.
