= Britta Badour =

Canadian poet

Britta Badour is a Canadian poet, whose debut collection Wires That Sputter was published in 2023.

Born and raised in Kingston, Ontario, she is currently based in Toronto. She has performed as a spoken word poet for a number of years prior to publishing Wires That Sputter, and has taught spoken word performance courses at Seneca College.

Wires That Sputter was a shortlisted nominee for the 2024 Trillium Book Award for English poetry, the 2024 Gerald Lampert Award, and the 2024 Pat Lowther Award.
