= I'm So Glad We Had This Time Together =

2024 memoir by Maurice Vellekoop

I'm So Glad We Had This Time Together: A Memoir
- Author: Maurice Vellekoop
- Language: English
- Genre: Comics, memoir
- Publisher: Pantheon Books
- Publication date: February 27, 2024
- Publication place: Canada
- Pages: 496
- ISBN: 978-1-0390-1050-5

I'm So Glad We Had This Time Together: A Memoir is a comic book written and illustrated by Maurice Vellekoop. In it, Vellekoop describes his experience growing up within a conservative family while being gay and talks about his difficulty to connect intimately with other men during his adult life.

The book was the winner of the 2024 Toronto Book Award, and the Trillium Book Award for English Prose in 2025.

== Reception ==
Publishers Weekly, which gave the book a starred review, praised both the writing and art, noting its "nostalgic look and rich colors." They concluded the review by saying the book would please both new and old readers of Vellekoop's works. Kirkus Reviews described the book as a "raw, revealing chronicle." A review published by The Booklist praised the art present in the book as well as the openness shown by the author in what the reviewer calls "a magnificent, magnified bildungsroman".
