= Alex Thibodeau =

Alex Thibodeau is a Canadian writer from Quebec City, Quebec. She is most noted for her novel Comme les éclipses, which won the Governor General's Award for French-language fiction at the 2026 Governor General's Awards.

She previously published the 2020 poetry collection Infantia, which won the Prix de la relève from the Conseil des arts et des lettres du Québec and the Prix Félix-Leclerc de la poésie in 2021.
