= Brian Joseph Davis =

Canadian producer

Brian Joseph Davis is a Canadian-born filmmaker and digital artist.

== Biography ==
Davis began exhibiting in the mid-aughts, working at the intersection of digital technology, memory, and pop culture. In 2006 he built a public recording studio at a gallery and paid visitors to sing the Beatles song "Yesterday" from memory. Davis' "Yesterduh" garnered international coverage when the recordings were released online and went viral.

In 2012 his project The Composites became one of the most visited Tumblrs of the year. As Davis told the BBC, The Composites used "forensic art software, descriptive prose, with crowd sourced feedback, to create portraits of literary characters." The Atlantic called The Composites "Murakami meets CSI."

From 2008 to 2010 he was president of the indie record label Blocks Recording Club.

After relocating to Brooklyn with his wife, the novelist Emily Schultz, where the pair co-founded the literary website Joyland: A hub for short fiction. In 2016 Davis collaborated with Schultz to adapt her novel The Blondes for AMC Networks' Shudder streaming platform. When Schultz regained the rights in 2019, she and Davis produced a scripted podcast adaptation starring Madeline Zima and Rob Belushi.
