= Hannah Green (poet) =

Canadian poet

Hannah Green is a Canadian poet from Winnipeg, Manitoba. She is also an editor at CV2, a Canadian poetry journal.

== Writing ==
Green's poetry has appeared in The Malahat Review, Prairie Fire, Arc, and Matrix.

Writing for Quill & Quire, Micheline Maylor called Green's debut "a revelation of living in our anxious times," praising the shifting role of the dissociated narrator as they move between actor, writer, and director of the cinematic poem.

== Awards and honours ==
- 2017: Shortlisted, Room poetry contest.
- 2021: Finalist, RBC Bronwen Wallace Award for Emerging Writers, for the poetry manuscript Xanax Cowboy.
- 2023: Governor General's Award for English-language poetry, for Xanax Cowboy.
- 2024: Gerald Lampert Award, awarded by the League of Canadian Poets for a first book of poetry, for Xanax Cowboy.

== Bibliography ==
- Xanax Cowboy. House of Anansi Press, 2023. ISBN 9781487011154.
