= Adele Megann =

Canadian writer (born 1962)

- Born: September 3, 1962 (age 63)
- Education: Concordia University; University of Notre Dame (MA); Concordia University (BEd)
- Occupation: Writer
- Writing career
- Notable awards: RBC Bronwen Wallace Award for Emerging Writers (1995)

Adele Megann (born September 3, 1962) is a Canadian writer. She is a recipient of the Bronwen Wallace Memorial Award.

== Biography ==
Megann attended Concordia University, received an MA from the University of Notre Dame in 1985 and a BEd from the University of Calgary 1998.

Megann is a Newfoundlander based in Halifax, Nova Scotia. Her short fiction has been published in many Canadian and United States reviews and anthologies. As an active member of the writing community, Megann has won several awards, emceed readings, and taught creative writing. She has given over thirty readings and interviews. Megann lived several years in Calgary, where she was part of the Pack of Liars writing workshop, and was a fiction editor of Dandelion magazine. Since moving to Nova Scotia in 1999, Megann has participated in Writers in the Schools throughout the province.

Megann's plays have been read at the Exodus Tuesday Reading Series. She has performed twice in the Playwrights in Performance Cabaret. She has written curriculum guides for Exodus Theatre Society and coordinated their school matinees. In the summer of 2005, she was awarded a grant by the Province of Nova Scotia to write a play.

Megann has taught diverse subjects to children and adults, including those with disabilities. In the present day, she mostly teaches music. She once owned a candle-making business called Beesworks Chandlery.

She was fiction editor of Dandelion magazine. Her work has appeared in a number of literary journals and anthologies including Boundless Alberta.

== Awards ==
- 1995 Bronwen Wallace Memorial Award
- 2001 24th Annual Atlantic Writing Competition, Honourable Mention in Novel category,
- 2002 2-20-200 Contest, Filling Station, First runner-up
- 2002 Journey Prize, Nomination for the

== Works ==
- Boundless Alberta, NeWest Press, 1993, ISBN 978-0-920897-41-6
