= The Blondes =

Satirical horror novel by Emily Schultz

The Blondes is a satirical horror novel by Emily Schultz that was published in 2012 by St. Martin's Press. The novel was later adapted into a television series and podcast of the same name.

== Background ==
The idea for the book came about while Schultz was reading Vanity Fair and saw a Gucci advertisement filled with rabid looking blondes. The book's protagonist is Hazel Hayes, a graduate student who finds out that she is pregnant after an affair with her professor. Shortly after discovering that she is pregnant a pandemic begins that only effects women with blonde hair. The story is told as a retrospective narration to Hayes's unborn child.

== Reception ==
The reviews for the book were mixed. Publishers Weekly's review notes that not all readers will agree with the underlying assumption "that women only matter when they're dangerous." A review in Kirkus Reviews praised the book for its dark satire and the ambiguous metaphor of the disease. A review written by Isabella Biedenharn in Entertainment Weekly, criticized the book for trying too hard which leads to a boring read. In a Booklist review, Donna Seaman writes that "Schultz sharply addresses a slew of social failings ... in this ferociously clever, exceedingly well written variation on the pandemic novel". The book was a 2013 Trillium Book Award finalist.

== Adaptations ==
In June 2017, The Hollywood Reporter revealed that The Blondes would be among the first series to premiere on AMC Networks' Shudder streaming service.

In 2019, Schultz regained the rights and collaborated with executive producer Duncan Birmingham along with directors Brian Joseph Davis and Jenny Grace to create a podcast that drew on the novel. The scripted podcast based on the novel was released on July 8, 2019, and starred Madeline Zima, Robert Belushi, Helen Hong, Dana Berger, and Cecilia Corrigan. In 2020, it was announced that the European podcast network, Sybel, will produce French and Spanish language versions of The Blondes podcast.
