= Gyllian Raby =

Canadian playwright (born 1959)

- Born: March 7, 1959 (age 67); Wales
- Occupations: Playwright, Director, Dramaturg
- Years active: 1979-present
- Website: http://spartan.ac.brocku.ca/~graby/

Gyllian Raby (born March 7, 1959, in Wales) is a Canadian playwright, director, and dramaturg. She is currently the assistant director of the Department of Dramatic Arts at Brock University.

== Early life and education ==
After finishing her drama degree in Manchester University, England, in 1979, she moved to Alberta, Canada and co-founded One Yellow Rabbit Performance Theatre, of which she was the artistic director until 1984, and Co-Artistic Director with Michael Green from 1984 to 1987. During this time, she finished her master's degree in dramatic literature at the University of Calgary. In 1988, she became the artistic director of Northern Lights Theatre in Edmonton for four years, during which time she produced works with artists such as Robert Lepage, Ray Bradbury, and Debra Schantz. Afterward she freelanced in Eastern Canada and USA with a variety of companies, ranging from Theatre Newfoundland-Labrador and Eastern Front to Cincinnati Playhouse in the Park, Ensemble Theatre Cincinnati, Thousand Islands Playhouse, and the Shaw Festival.

== Career ==
In 2001, Raby came to work at Brock University to teach acting, directing and playwriting. She also teaches Anna Halpin's RSVP approach to devising theatre. In collaboration with St. Catharine's children's theatre Carousel Players artistic directors Kim Selody and Pablo Felices Luna, Raby has taken RSVP into the Niagara school system. She has directed ten mainstage productions at Brock University, a number of which have been adaptations of international classics.

Raby's interest in theatre about science developed through her plays The Pageant of the Comet (1987), Faust and the Human Genome (1999-2003), and Sheilagh Stephenson's play An Experiment with an Airpump, has resulted in several papers, most recently "Contracting the Audience for Plays About Science." Currently, she is working on a script about human fertility and biogenetic engineering.

As a dramaturg, one of Raby's most notable works is Fingers and Toes written by Logan Mendland, which premiered in 2004 and is still being produced by theatre companies in the US.

== Awards and honours ==
- Alberta Culture Award (1983)
- Elizabeth Stirling Haynes Award for Best Production (1987) and Best Direction (1990)
- Canada Council Explorations Award for video/production (1988)
- Chalmers New Play Award (1991)
- Michael Lukovich Heritage Trust Award (1992)
- Cincinnati Critics' citation for Best University Production (1998)
- Queen's University Creativity Award (2000)
- Brock University Humanities Research Institute Award (2001)
- Brock University Internal SSHRC, Laidlaw Foundation and T.A.L.K. Niagara grants for studying RSVP Creative Process in Niagara schools (2006)
- Atlantic Artists Center USA Residency Award (2008)
- SSHRC Award for Commotion: Devising Theatre with Niagara Youth (2009-2011)
