= Dani Couture =

Canadian poet and novelist

Danielle Couture
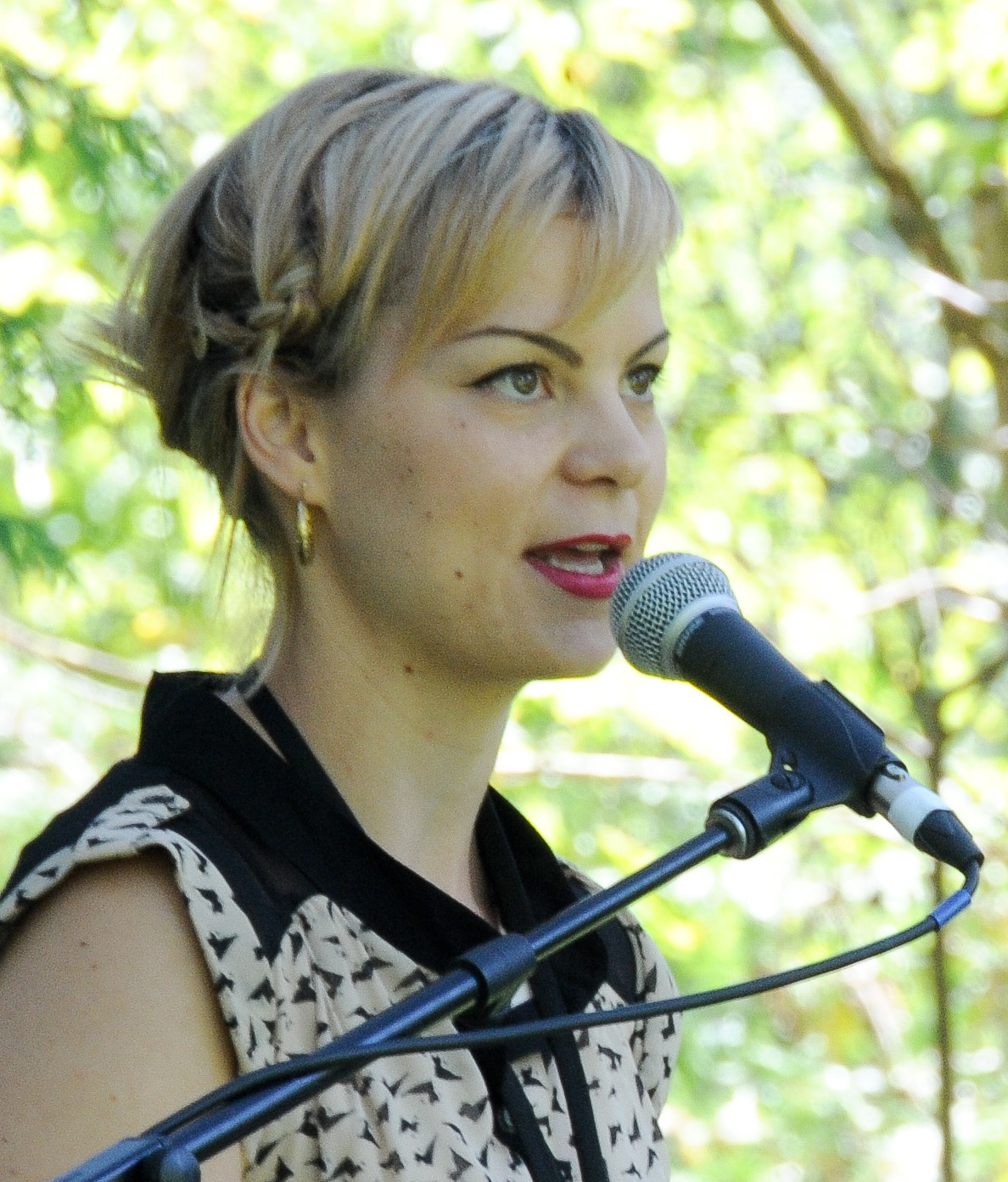
- Couture at the Eden Mills Writers' Festival in 2012
- Occupation: Novelist, poet, and literary editor
- Language: English
- Period: 2006 – Present
- Genre: Poetry, literary fiction
- Notable works: Sweet (2010)
- Notable awards: ReLit Award for Poetry (2011)

Website
- danicouture.ca

Danielle (Dani) Couture (born 1978) is a Canadian poet and novelist.

In 2011, Couture's second book of poetry, Sweet, was shortlisted for the Trillium Book Award in English for Poetry and won the ReLit Award for Poetry. In 2011, she also received an Honour of Distinction from the Writers' Trust of Canada's Dayne Ogilvie Prize.

She is also the literary editor at This Magazine.

== Biography ==
Couture was born on a military base to a francophone father and an anglophone mother, both of whom were enlisted in the Canadian Armed Forces. She has lived in ten cities, including North Bay, Vancouver, Windsor and Taichung, Taiwan. She currently lives in Toronto, Ontario.

Couture's poetry, essays, reviews and interviews have been published in various literary journals and magazines, as well as anthologies, including The Walrus, The Globe and Mail, Taddle Creek, The Fiddlehead, Arc and Best Canadian Poems in English.

== Selected works ==
=== Poetry ===
- Good Meat. Toronto: Pedlar Press, 2006.
- Sweet. Toronto: Pedlar Press, 2010.
- YAW. Toronto: Mansfield, 2014.
- Listen Before Transmit. Toronto: Wolsak & Wynn, 2018.

=== Chapbooks ===
- Black Sea Nettle. Toronto: Anstruther, 2017.

=== Novels ===
- Algoma. Invisible Publishing, 2011

== Awards and recognition ==
| Year | Title | Award | Category | Result | Ref |
|---|---|---|---|---|---|
| 2010 | Sweet | Trillium Book Award, English | Poetry | Shortlisted | |
| 2011 | Sweet | Dayne Ogilvie Prize | — | Honour of Distinction | |
| 2011 | Sweet | ReLit Award | Poetry | Won | |
| 2015 | YAW | ReLit Award | Poetry | Shortlisted | |

== See also ==
- Canadian literature
- Canadian poetry
- List of Canadian poets
- List of Canadian writers
