= Vincent Lambert (writer) =

Canadian poet

- Born: 1980 (age 45–46); Saint-Narcisse-de-Beaurivage, Quebec, Canada
- Occupation: Writer
- Years active: 2000s–present

Vincent Lambert (born 1980 in Saint-Narcisse-de-Beaurivage) is a Canadian poet from Quebec. He is most noted for his book Le Royaume des chuchotements, which won the Governor General's Award for French-language poetry at the 2026 Governor General's Awards.

== Works ==
- Paysages récents - 2005
- La fin des temps par un témoin oculaire - 2013
- Mirabilia - 2019
- Le Royaume des chuchotements - 2026
