= Bardia Sinaee =

Iranian Canadian poet

Bardia Sinaee is an Iranian Canadian poet and editor, whose debut collection Intruder was the winner of the Trillium Book Award for English Poetry in 2022.

Born in Tehran, Iran, Sinaee moved to Canada with his family in childhood and grew up in Mississauga, Ontario. In 2012, he won the Readers' Choice Award in the inaugural Walrus Poetry Prize from The Walrus. In 2020, he was the co-winner of the Robin Blaser Poetry Award from The Capilano Review.

Intruder was themed around human sprawl, economic precarity, and disease intruding into the human body, inspired partially by Sinaee's own battle with cancer in his 20s and partially by the COVID-19 pandemic in Canada. In addition to the Trillium Book Award, it was shortlisted for the 2022 Gerald Lampert Award.

An MFA graduate of the University of Guelph, he previously published the chapbooks Blue Night Express and Salamander Festival. He has served as an editor at Arc Poetry Magazine, Humber Literary Review and the Literary Review of Canada. In 2023, he was the guest editor of Best Canadian Poetry 2024.
