= Morgan Campbell =

Canadian sports journalist

Morgan Campbell (born 1976) is a Canadian sports journalist and memoirist. He is most noted for his 2024 book My Fighting Family: Borders and Bloodlines and the Battles That Made Us, which was shortlisted for the Trillium Book Award for English Prose in 2025.

The grandson of jazz pianist Claude Jones, he grew up in Mississauga, Ontario, and had ambitions of playing football in the National Football League before studying journalism at Northwestern University. He became a sportswriter for the Toronto Star until leaving the paper in December 2019, and subsequently joined CBC Sports as a sports reporter and correspondent.

Campbell is a past winner in the Sports Writing Category at the National Newspaper Awards and a finalist for several major book awards including Balcones Prize, and the Rakuten Kobo Emerging Writer Prize.
