= Julie Roorda =

Julie Roorda is a Canadian writer. She is most noted for her 2026 poetry collection Catastrophilia, which was a shortlisted finalist for the Governor General's Award for English-language poetry at the 2026 Governor General's Awards.

She has published both poetry and fiction, including the novel A Thousand Consolations and the short story collection How to Tell If Your Frog Is Dead.

== Works ==
=== Poetry ===
- Eleventh Toe - 2001
- A Courage Underground - 2006
- Floating Bodies - 2010
- Catastrophilia - 2026

=== Fiction ===
- Naked in the Sanctuary - 2004
- Wings of a Bee - 2007
- A Thousand Consolations - 2017
- How to Tell If Your Frog Is Dead - 2019
- The Crack in the Teacup - 2027
