= Jake Byrne (writer) =

Canadian poet

Jake Byrne is a Canadian poet from Toronto, Ontario.

Their debut book, Celebrate Pride with Lockheed Martin, was published in 2023, addressing themes around the co-optation and appropriation of LGBTQ culture by corporate and militaristic interests. The book was named to the initial longlist for the Gerald Lampert Award in 2024.

They followed up in 2024 with DADDY, which won the Trillium Book Award for English Poetry in 2025.
