= Edwin Procunier =

Canadian playwright, teacher and art collector

Edwin Robert Procunier (1 October 1927 - 26 September 2011) was a Canadian playwright, teacher and art collector. He founded the London Community Players, and was President of Theatre Ontario and the St. Thomas-Elgin Public Art Centre. Upon his death he bequeathed 372 paintings from his collection to the province of Newfoundland and Labrador, where they are on display in The Rooms museum.

== Life and career ==
Procunier was born on 1 October 1927 in Lamaline, Newfoundland, to William Procunier and Minnie (née Pugh). His father died when he was three years old and he and his brother George were raised by their mother in Harbour Grace. They moved to Ontario when Edwin was 15 so he could attend university. Edwin took Honours English at University of Western Ontario, his MA at Queen's University, and his teacher's certificate at the Ontario College of Education, University of Toronto. He taught English at Brantford Collegiate High School, and later at Althouse College, University of Western Ontario. He founded the London Community Players, and was President of Theatre Ontario and the St. Thomas-Elgin Public Art Centre. He lectured for the Canadian Opera Company.

== Plays ==
Procunier wrote 27 stage plays, produced across Canada and on CBC Radio.

== Legacy ==
Procunier bequeathed 372 paintings from his collection to the province of Newfoundland and Labrador, where they are on display in The Rooms museum. He also established the Procunier Family Music Scholarship at Memorial University of Newfoundland. Procunier Hall at The Palace Theatre, London, Ontario was dedicated to him after his death.

== Works ==
=== One Act Plays ===
- A Knife to Thy Throat
- Granite and Oak
- Two Sides of Darkness
- The Strength of Love
- The Second Duchess
- The Beginning of Summer
- Voices of Desire
- The Moonless Nights
- Incident at the Poseidon
- Appassionata
- Let Me Have Men About Me

=== Full Length Plays ===
- A Visit to Cal's Mother
- The Higher Mountains
