= Sara Peters =

Sara Peters is a Canadian writer, originally from Antigonish, Nova Scotia, and currently based in Toronto, Ontario. She is most noted for her 2025 novel Mother of God, which was a shortlisted finalist for the Governor General's Award for English-language fiction at the 2026 Governor General's Awards.

She previously published the poetry collection 1996 and the experimental novel I Become a Delight to My Enemies. The latter book was a Trillium Book Award nominee in the prose category in 2020.
