= Maurice Vellekoop =

Canadian artist and illustrator (born 1964)

- Born: 1964 (age 62); Toronto
- Education: Ontario College of Art and Design, Toronto
- Known for: Graphic artist, illustrator
- Awards: Firecracker Alternative Book Award, 1999; Canadian Cartoonist Hall of Fame, 2024

Maurice Vellekoop (born 1964) is a Canadian artist, cartoonist, and illustrator. Vellekoop is known for his queer cartoons, which often feature nude male figures. He has drawn pin-ups as well as multi-character comics. Vellekoop is also a fashion designer, and his drawings and designs have appeared in popular magazines across the United States.

Vellekoop was born and raised in Canada, where he attended art school and became a renowned artist. His work has been featured on the global stage and is also interdisciplinary as he has written books, worked on films, and also published in major publications.

== Early life ==
Maurice Vellekoop was born in 1964, and was raised on the outskirts of Toronto. He was raised in the Christian Reformed Church, a Calvinist sect, which was not accepting of homosexuality. He participated in weekly church services, catechism classes, went to Christian schools, and was a member of the Calvinist Cadet Corps.

In his kindergarten report card, he was described as a "self-confident child in school" and "is spending more time with other children in such activities as the "house" and the sand box." Vellekoop was cognizant of his uniqueness from an early age when he desired dolls and began to draw intricate images of princesses.

He had four older siblings, all artists. His parents were Dutch immigrants. His father was known for his love of opera, and his mother ran a hair salon out of the family home's basement. Ingrid, Vellekoop's sister, encouraged him to attend the Ontario College of Art and Design, which he did from 1982 to 1986.

== Professional life ==
After graduating from art school, Vellekoop began his career as a freelance artist, and was featured in several shows early on in his career. In 1986, several of his comics were published via REACTOR Art and Design in Toronto. He joined the REACTOR studio near the beginning of his career. He wrote a few zines entitled "Fear Comics" and "Guilt Comics." His work was even featured internationally in the Palazzo Fortuny in Venice, Italy. By 1994, Vellekoop was working for popular American magazines like Vogue who sent him as a reporter to cover the "autumn couture collection" in Paris, which he published as a comic. He also completed work for art exhibitions in the Netherlands.

Vellekoop illustrated for the book Sex Tips for a Dominatrix, written by Patricia Payne. In his work in the fashion industry, he is known for using "felt pens and watercolours." Vellekoop saw himself as a "mild satirist" in general and utilized fashion as well as sex in satirical work.

Vellekoop's work was featured in several shows in the United Kingdom including at Twenty Twenty Two in Manchester and Space Station Sixty Five in London. He wrote his own coming of age story, I'm So Glad We Had This Time Together, which shares more about his early years specifically his religious upbringing and growing up in the North American suburbs.

His work also appeared in the Jeffrey Schwarz' documentary film Boulevard! A Hollywood Story. The film tells the story of Gloria Swanson and her work to make Sunset Boulevard a musical where she ends up in a love triangle with two gay songwriters: Dickson Hughes and Richard Stapley.

His work has appeared in publications such as Drawn & Quarterly, Time, GQ, Cosmopolitan, The New Yorker, Madamoiselle, Cosmetics, The New York Times Magazine, Rolling Stone, Entertainment Weekly, Fashion, Mother Jones, Glamour, and Wallpaper, as well as in the books ABC Book: A Homoerotic Primer, Sex Tips from a Dominatrix, Pinups, Mensroom Reader and Vellevision.

He has also done work for multiple corporations including Swissair, Abercrombie & Fitch, Air Canada, Smart Car, LVMH, and Bush Irish Whiskey.

== Artistry in comics ==
In Vellekoop's Pin-Ups, Vellekoop is influenced by a number of queer artists including George Quaintance, Harry Bush, and Tom of Finland. His artistic style reflects the masculine and BDSM styles of these artists. Vellekoop is also influenced by popular culture including "Leonardo da Vinci's famous Human Figure in a Circle Illustrating Proportions," and "Disney's Jungle Book." In terms of comics, Vellekoop's main inspiration is Alison Bechdal and has also been greatly influenced by queer writers, like Oscar Wilde.

In Borrelli's Stylishly Drawn: Contemporary Fashion Illustration, Vellekoop is categorized as a diverse artist "borrowing elements of caricature and cartooning to do so, often with much humor and wit." Vellekoop's fashion drawings utilizes themes of sexuality as well as different ethnicities and gender identities.

One of Vellekoop's reoccurring characters is Gloria Badcock, a magazine editor who serves as a symbol of sexual liberation and freedom. The character is pansexual but the character's story is representative of the relationship between many women and gay men, which Vellekoop believes is special and sacred.

Vellekoop's style has been described as "undeniably celebratory queerness" as his work openly discusses homosexuality.

In 2024, Vellekoop was inducted into the Giants of the North: The Canadian Cartoonist Hall of Fame.

His graphic novel memoir I'm So Glad We Had This Time Together was the winner of the Trillium Book Award for English Prose in 2025.

== Personal life ==
Vellekoop lives on Toronto Island. He is openly gay and is in a relationship with his partner, Gordon Bowness.

== Books ==
- Maurice Vellekoop's ABC Book. A Homoerotic Primer. New York: Gates of Heck, 1997.
- "Vellevision." A Cocktail of Comics and Pictures. Montreal: Drawn & Quarterly, 1997.
- A Nut at the Opera. Montreal: Drawn & Quarterly, 2006
- Maurice Vellekoop's Pin Ups, Green Candy Press: San Francisco, 2009.
- The World of Gloria Badcock, Koyama Press: Toronto, 2011.
- I'm So Glad We Had This Time Together, Pantheon Books, 2024.
