= Kevin Connolly (writer) =

Canadian poet (born 1962)

- Born: March 20, 1962 (age 64); Biloxi, Mississippi, U.S.
- Occupations: Writer, poet, critic
- Partner: Gil Adamson

Kevin Michael Connolly (born March 20, 1962) is a Canadian poet, editor, and teacher who was born in Biloxi, Mississippi and grew up in Maple, Ontario. Connolly has served as an editor for presses such as ECW Press, Coach House Press, and McClelland & Stewart. He is currently the poetry editor at House of Anansi Press. He has edited and published more than 60 full-length poetry collections, many of them debuts.

Connolly's book Drift won the 2005 Trillium Award, and his fourth book, Revolver, was shortlisted for the 2009 Griffin Poetry Prize. He received the 2015 Artist Award from the KM Hunter Foundation.

== Biography ==
Connolly graduated from York University in 1985 with a Bachelor of Arts with honors.

After leaving York University, he co-founded what! magazine with fellow York graduate Jason Sherman. The magazine published from 1985 to 1993, and was considered influential.

Connolly incorporates the strategies and technique of language poetry in his work and his poetry has appeared in a number of small presses, including The Monika Schnarre story and Deathcake. In 1998, Eye Weekly (a Toronto Star newspaper-based division) hired Connolly to write columns on poetry, food, and theater, but by 2004, he left to start working as an editor for Coach House Press.

Connolly currently resides in Toronto with his partner, Canadian writer Gil Adamson.

== Works and criticisms ==
In 1995, Connolly released his first collection of work, Asphalt cigar (Coach House Press), which was nominated for the League of Canadian Poets' Gerald Lampert Award for best first book of poetry. Upon releasing Asphalt cigar (1995), Connolly was one of six writers featured in Blues and True Concussions (House of Anansi Press, 1996), an anthology of new Toronto poets. In 2002, Connolly released his second collection of work, titled Happyland (ECW Press), but did not gain greater recognition until the release of his 2005 collection, Drift (House of Anansi Press), which won the Trillium Book Award for poetry. His second and third collections were both successful, but were commonly criticized for showing too much of his process and "lacking cohesive shape". In 2008, Connolly released his fourth collection of work, titled Revolver (House of Anansi Press), which was nominated for the 2009 Griffin Poetry Prize. Revolver was well received, and Connolly was noted for his use of humor in his writing.

Connolly was a runner-up for the Griffin Poetry Prize alongside writer Jeramy Dodds' poem "crabwise to the hounds", which Connolly himself edited.

== Contributions to Canadian poetry ==
Connolly has taught workshops and held educational competitions that focus on the process of poetry writing. During the 1990s, he published the early work of Canadians such as Lynn Crosbie, Gary Barwin, Daniel Jones, Stuart Ross and Gil Adamson in a collection titled Pink Dog Chapbook. He served as a poetry judge at the 2006 Great Canadian Literary Hunt, and his poem "Sundial" was featured in the 40th anniversary edition of This Magazine. His poem "Chain", from the 2005 Drift collection, was included in 30 in 30, a collection created to celebrate National Poetry Month.

== Works ==
- Asphalt Cigar (1995)
- Happyland (2002)
- Drift (2005) (winner of the Trillium Book Award)
- Revolver (2008) (shortlisted for the 2009 Canadian Griffin Poetry Prize)
