= Nong Khai refugee camp =

Former refugee camp in Thailand

Nong Khai Refugee Camp was built after the influx of Laotian refugees (Khmu, Lao, and Hmong) escaped into the Kingdom of Thailand after the fall of the Kingdom of Laos (or Laos). Since the Central Intelligence Agency (CIA) pulled out of Laos on May 14, 1975 after the fall of Long Tieng (also spelled Long Chieng, Long Cheng, or Long Chen).

The refugee camp was divided into two sections: the Lao and the Hmong. If the family spoke Laotian or Lao, the family was assigned to reside on the west or the Lao side, however, if they spoke Hmong or Khmu, then the family was assigned to the east side.

There were 36 bungalows or akans on the east side; these bungalows were built on stilts and there were six (6) akans to a row of six (6). Altogether there were 36 bungalows. Each bungalow was 16 divided compartments on each side of the building and together there were 32 rooms. Each compartment measured roughly 8 feet wide by 10 feet deep. These compartments were made to be occupied by a family of four or five. In many cases, Lao families had more kids than each of the rooms were made for.

On the Hmong side, there was no electricity. On both sides of the buildings, thatch huts were built to support more occupants to each compartments. The bungalows on the Hmong side, except #6, were split, the west half was housed by Hmong, and the east of the building was housed by Kmhmu and Lao from Sam Neua Province.
