= Joyland (Schultz novel) =

Joyland is the debut novel of Canadian author Emily Schultz published by ECW Press in 2005. In 2013 due to the publication of Stephen King's novel of the same name the ebook version of Schultz's novel received a bump in publication sales due to readers mistaking her work for King's which was not yet available for purchase as an ebook.

As a response Schultz created the humour blog Spending the Stephen King Money, detailing the purchases she made from the bump in royalties along with a blurb as to whether or not she believed King would approve of her purchases. In June 2014, King responded to her blog saying that he was happy for Schultz and was going to purchase her book.
