= Sydney Hegele =

Canadian writer

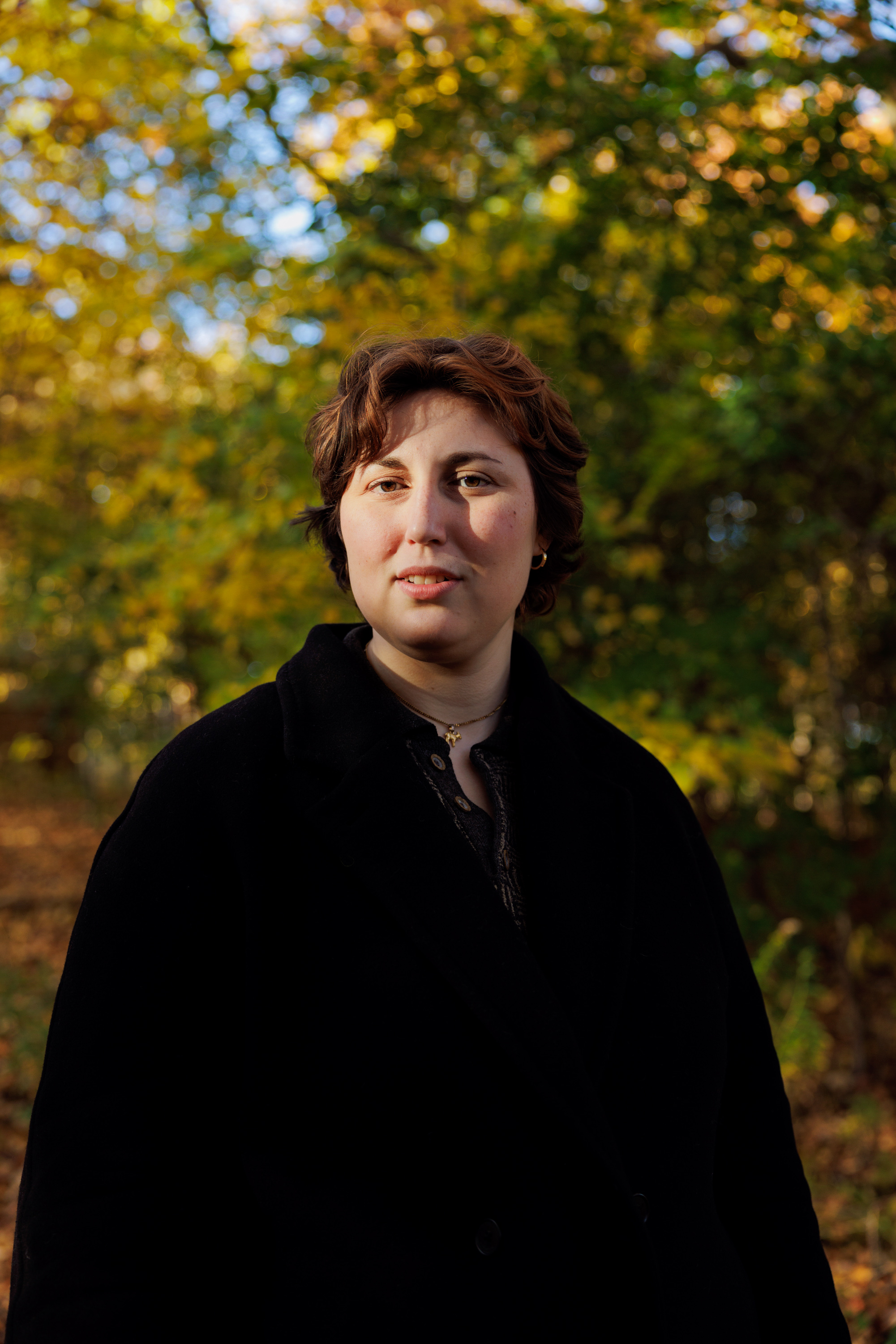
Credit to Angela Lewis, 2024

Sydney Hegele (formerly known as Sydney Warner Brooman) is a Canadian writer.

== Early life and education ==
Originally from Grimsby, Ontario, Hegele attended the University of Western Ontario in London, Ontario and is currently based in Toronto. They identify as queer and use gender-neutral pronouns.

== Writing career ==
Hegele's debut short story collection, The Pump, was published in 2021.

The Pump, a volume of interrelated short stories about outsiders living in a small town in Southern Ontario, was compared to the Southern Ontario Gothic style of writers such as Alice Munro. The book was the winner of the 2022 ReLit Award for short fiction, and was shortlisted for the 2022 Trillium Book Awards for English fiction.

The book was also selected by CBC Books in 2022 as part of a Pride Month reading list of books by LGBTQ Canadian writers.

Hegele's debut novel Bird Suit was published by Invisible Publishing in May 2024. Their essay collection Bad Kids, edited by author Alicia Elliott, is forthcoming in 2028.

== Selected works ==
=== Essays ===
- "The Great Iconoclast", EVENT Magazine, 2023
- "Reading Stephen King’s ‘It’ As a Child Confused My Sense of Justice", Catapult Magazine, November 2022''
- "I Can’t Separate My Writing and My Diagnosis, So I Use Them to Help One Another", Electric Literature, August 2022
- "I Thought I’d Never Find Love After My Dissociative Identity Disorder Diagnosis", Catapult Magazine, July 2022

=== Short stories ===
- "Dirt Mouth", Room Magazine, July 2023
- "Mal Aux Dents (Or Toothache)", American Chordata, 2020

=== Poetry ===
- The Last Thing I Will See Before I Die, 845 Press, 2022

== Awards ==
- ReLit Award for Short Fiction for The Pump (2022)
- Finalist for the Trillium Book Award for The Pump, English Fiction (2022)
