= Joyland, North Carolina =

- Unincorporated community
- Location within the state of North Carolina
- Coordinates: 35°59′29″N 78°51′16″W
- Country: United States
- State: North Carolina
- County: Durham
- Time zone: UTC-5 (Eastern (EST))
  - Summer (DST): UTC-4 (EDT)
- GNIS feature ID: 1020993

Joyland is an unincorporated community in Durham County, North Carolina, United States, on North Carolina Highway 98, east of its junction with U.S. Route 70.

Most of Joyland was annexed by the city of Durham in 1966.
