= Jacob McArthur Mooney =

Canadian poet, blogger, and literary critic

Jacob McArthur Mooney (born 1983) is a Canadian poet, blogger, and literary critic. He is most noted for his 2011 poetry collection Folk, which was a shortlisted Trillium Book Award finalist for English poetry in 2012.

== Titles ==
- The New Layman's Almanac (McClelland & Stewart, 2008)
- Folk (McClelland & Stewart, 2011)
