= Emily Schultz =

American novelist

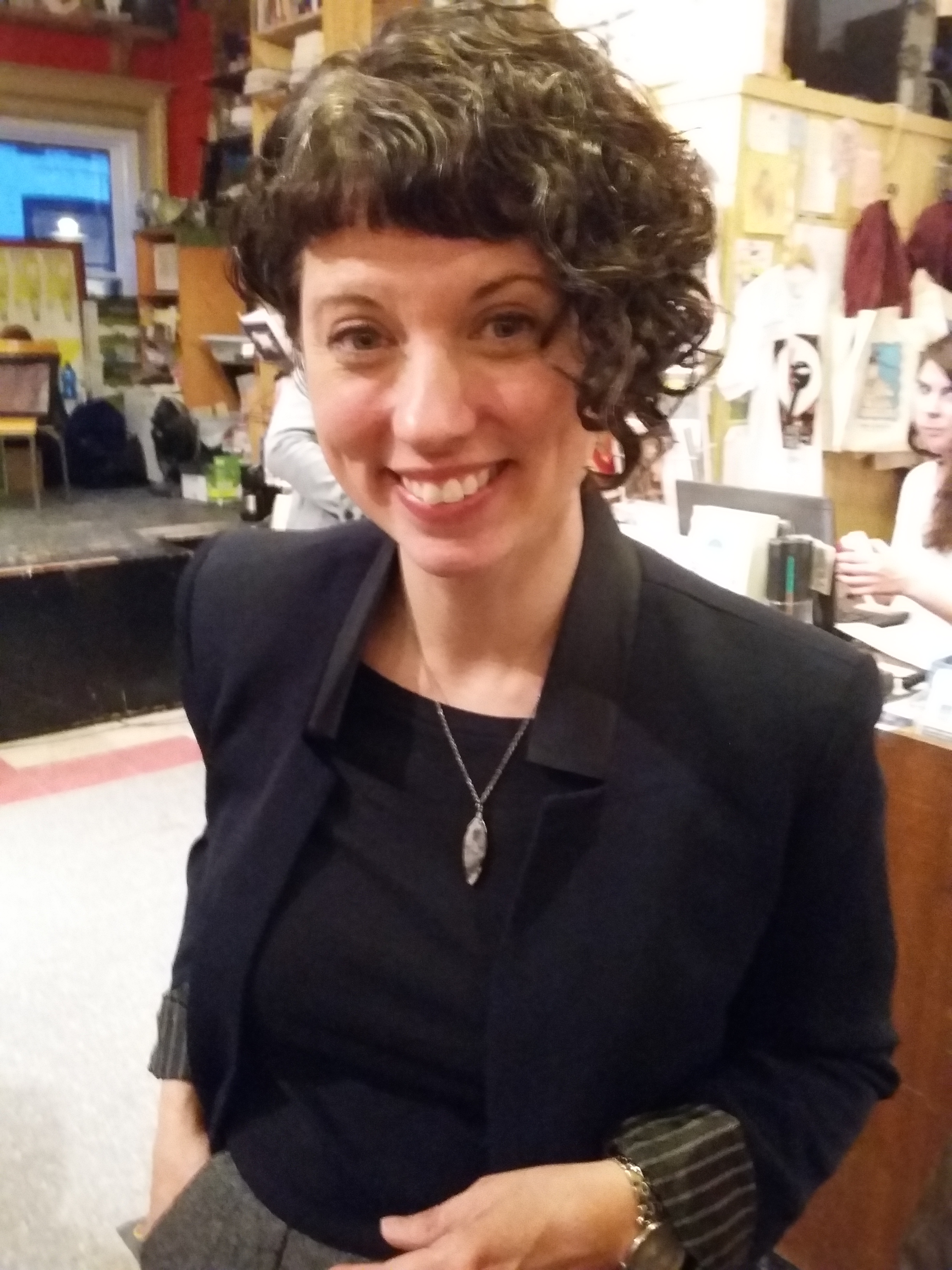
- Born: 1974 (age 51–52)
- Occupation: Writer
- Writing career
- Genre: Fiction
- Website: www.emilyschultz.com

Emily Schultz (born 1974) is an American fiction writer raised in Canada and now living in Brooklyn, New York.

== Life and career ==
During an onstage interview with Margaret Atwood, Schultz described how her own family settled in Canada from Michigan in the early 1970s when her father deserted the U.S. Army at the height of the Vietnam War. Schultz's father had used a guide for draft evaders and deserters issued by one of her future publishers, House of Anansi.

She is the author of Black Coffee Night, a Danuta Gleed nominated 2002 collection of stories. A story from that collection ("The Value of X") was adapted by Lynne Stopkewich, director of Kissed. In 2005 Schultz published her first novel, Joyland. and was included in a round table discussion hosted by The Globe and Mail with Sheila Heti titled "Tomorrow's Ondaatjes and Munros."

In 2009 House of Anansi Press published Schultz's second novel, Heaven Is Small. The satirical novel was based on her year spent as a night shift proofreader for Harlequin Enterprises.

In 2014 a glitch on Amazon caused customers to buy her novel Joyland by mistake, believing they were purchasing a novel by Stephen King with the same title. Schultz chronicled her experiences on a Tumblr called Spending the Stephen King Money.

Her novel The Blondes was published by St. Martin's Press in 2015 and listed as a Best Fiction Book of the Year by Kirkus, BookPage, and NPR, who described it as "scary and deeply, bitingly funny — a satire about gender that kept me reading until 4 in the morning — and a fine addition to the all-too-small genre of feminist horror." In May 2017 it was announced that The Blondes would be developed as an original series for AMC Networks' Shudder with Schultz writing along with her husband, video director Brian Joseph Davis. When Schultz regained the rights in 2019, she and Davis produced a scripted podcast adaptation starring Madeline Zima and Rob Belushi. It was executive produced by Duncan Birmingham.

In March 2019 it was announced that her next novel, Little Threats, was sold to Putnam at auction for publication in 2020. Set in 2008 and flashing back to the grunge-era 1990s, Little Threats is "a literary suspense about the new questions and old tragedies that surface after a young woman who pleaded guilty to her best friend's murder is released from prison."

Schultz is the co-founder of the literary website Joyland: A hub for short fiction. She is also the parent of an autistic child and is an advocate for special education in New York City.
