= Téa Mutonji =

Canadian writer and poet

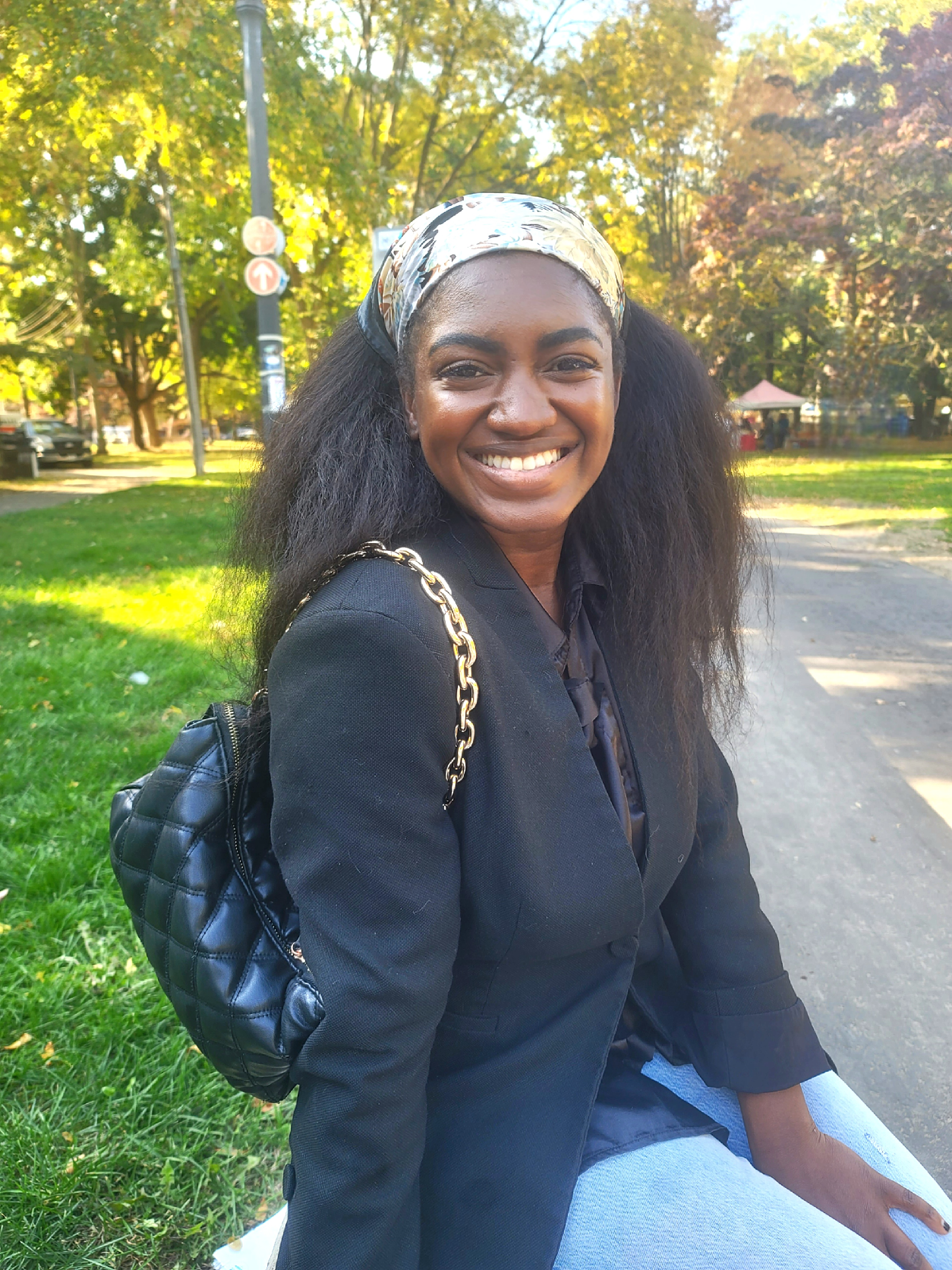
- Mutonji in Toronto, October 11, 2022
- Born: Democratic Republic of the Congo
- Education: University of Toronto (BA)
- Occupation: Author
- Writing career
- Notable work: Shut Up You're Pretty (2019)
- Notable awards: Trillium Book Award, English (2019); Edmund White Award (2020)

Téa Mutonji is a Canadian writer and poet, whose debut short story collection Shut Up You're Pretty was published in 2019.

== Early life ==
Born in the Democratic Republic of the Congo, Mutonji came to Canada with her family when she was young and grew up in the Scarborough district of Toronto and in Oshawa. While living in Scarborough, she worked in the service industry. She then studied media studies and creative writing at the Scarborough campus of the University of Toronto, and was planning to go to law school when she was selected as the first writer to be published by VS. Books, Vivek Shraya's Arsenal Pulp Press imprint for emerging writers of colour.

== Works ==
Shut Up You're Pretty, published in 2019, is a collection of linked short stories about a young girl's coming of age in Scarborough's Galloway neighborhood. The novel centers around Loli and her move from the Democratic Republic of the Congo to Canada, sexual experiences, grappling with gender roles, and issues revolving around poverty and consent. Mutonji wrote the novel in part to counter negative stereotypes of the neighbourhood with a narrative that depicted some of her own more positive experiences of having lived there.

In 2026, Mutonji released her debut novel, My Person, centered around two lifelong friends, one of which asks for distance in their relationship.

== Themes ==
In an interview with CityNews, Mutonji stated that she writes from an "activist lens".

Mutonji has expressed that being called pretty is not a compliment. It is offensive because it prioritizes women’s physical appearance and overshadows other attributes. Instead, Mutonji describes a shift that is happening where women demand that their character is looked at first.

== Accolades ==
In 2017, Mutonji was one of the winners of the Ontario Book Publishers Organization's What's Your Story? writing contest in the emerging Scarborough writer category, for her short story "There's a Bench Near the Scarborough Golf Club".

In 2023 she was named one of the ten winners of the Journey Prize, in a special edition devoted to Black Canadian writers.

Shut Up You're Pretty was selected for the 2024 edition of Canada Reads, where it was defended by actress Kudakwashe Rutendo.

Year	Work	Award	Category	Result	Ref
2019	Shut Up You're Pretty	Rogers Writers' Trust Fiction Prize	—	Shortlisted	
2019	Shut Up You're Pretty	Trillium Book Award	English	Won	
2020	Shut Up You're Pretty	Edmund White Award	—	Won	
2023	—	Journey Prize	—	Won	

== Bibliography ==
- —— (2019). Shut Up You're Pretty. Arsenal Pulp Press. ISBN 9781551527550.
- —— (2026). My Person. Random House Canada. ISBN 9781039011854.
