= Arthur Scaife =

English writer

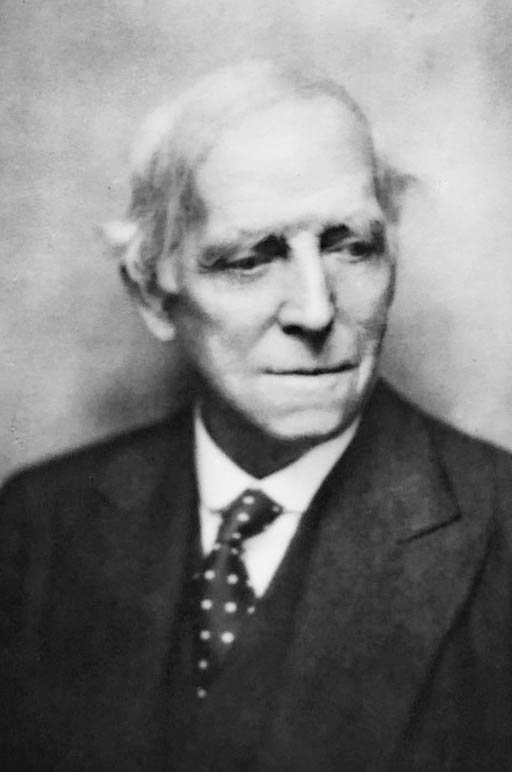
- Scaife in 1928
- Born: Arthur Hodgkin Scaife c. 1855; Melbourne, Victoria, Australia
- Died: April 2, 1934; Chiswick, London, England
- Occupations: Writer; editor; insurance broker
- Writing career
- Pen name: Kim Bilir
- Genres: Fiction; poetry; non-fiction; journalism

Arthur Hodgkin Scaife (c. 1855–1934) was an Australian-born English writer, editor, and insurance broker. Educated in England, he worked as an insurance agent in Constantinople for 18 years before moving to Canada in 1892, settling in the city of Victoria. He became the founding editor of the weekly newspaper The Province. Scaife was the author of two volumes of short stories and a novel which were the first works of fiction to be published in British Columbia. After a short period in Toronto, he moved to England where in 1900 he published two more books, an account of the Second Boer War and a satirical poem. Scaife took up positions in the insurance field again before his death in Chiswick in 1934.

== Biography ==
Arthur Hodgkin Scaife was born circa 1855 in Melbourne, Australia, the only son of Reginald and Amy Scaife. He was educated in England at Bradfield College, in Berkshire. Scaife chose banking and insurance as a career. He held an appointment in Constantinople for 18 years, rising to general manager of the New York Life Insurance Company. He also spent time in India and the Far East. In 1892, he and his wife travelled across North America to Vancouver. Scaife had the intention of setting up a branch of the New York insurance company.

In Victoria, he became in 1894 the first editor of the weekly newspaper The Province, holding that position for three and a half years. A column on newspaper history wrote that "his caustic style and absolute fearlessness in the puncturing of pretentious bubbles soon won for the new publication a wide circulation." In 1894 as well, Scaife began creating synoptical charts for the teaching of history in schools, the first chart depicting English history. Three years later, he took the position of managing director for the Comparative Synoptical Chart Company in Toronto. His charts were financially successful, and in 1898, he left Toronto to reside in England.

In London, Scaife again became an agent for the New York Life Insurance Company before joining Confederation Life at Bush House. While living at Chertsey, in 1912 he was appointed justice of the peace for Surrey. He assumed a local leadership role in the Liberal party. In the second half of the First World War he lived in Pimlico. Scaife died in a nursing home in Chiswick on 2 April 1934 at the age of 78 years. He was survived by his wife, four sons and two daughters.

== Writing ==
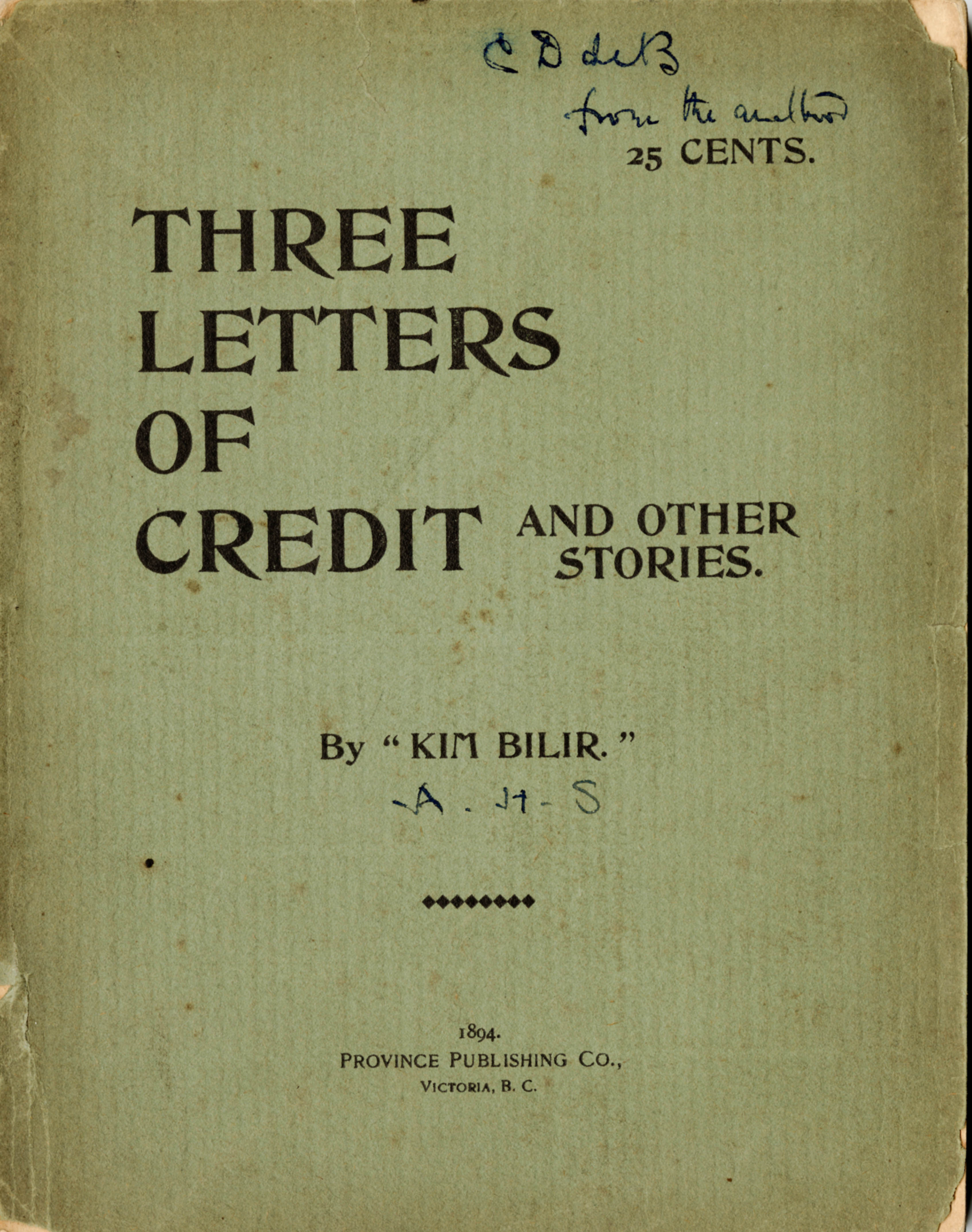
Three Letters of Credit and Other Stories. Province Publishing, Victoria, 1894.

In 1894, writing under the pseudonym Kim Bilir, Scaife published the first work of fiction in British Columbia, Three Letters of Credit and Other Stories. (Note: "Kim Bilir" is Turkish for "Who knows?".) It contained five stories that had previously appeared in The Province, of which the title story was the longest. The settings were cosmopolitan, including the inferred location of Constantinople, and also Vienna, the shores of the Black Sea, Winnipeg, and Greece. The Overland Monthly, a California magazine, wrote that "the stories are told with much humor, some keen character drawing, and good local color." Another favourable review, by the Toronto magazine The Week, singled out the comic situations of the bank clerk in the lead story.

In 1895, Scaife next published the first novel in British Columbia, As it Was in the Fifties. Not knowing the identity of the author, The Week stated that they wished they knew, "for a stronger story than "As it Was in the Fifties" we have rarely read". The review continued with a detailed summary of the plot, concerning the adventures of a young Englishman named Evan Evans, on his prospective journey to the gold fields of British Columbia. The Toronto newspaper The Globe had a more guarded opinion. While pronouncing the book to be very readable and reflecting good judgement, it wrote that the grasp of character was fair.

In the same year as his novel, Scaife followed with another book of short stories, Gemini and Lesser Lights. The locations represented were chiefly Turkey, Montenegro, and Bulgaria. The stories were praised by reviewers.

In London, now writing under his own name, Scaife published in 1900 an account of the Second Boer War called The War to Date. Reception was mixed. The periodical The Speaker curtly dismissed it as merely a compilation derived from the newspapers and lacking even limited temporary value. In contrast, Canadian Magazine reported it as well done and noted its splendid illustrations.

Also in 1900, Scaife put out his final book, a satirical poem entitled The Soliloquy of a Shadow-Shape on a Holiday from Hades. Written in quatrains, it featured a contemporary version of Omar Khayyam, who has written a new version of his famous Rubaiyat. Khayyam asks the editor to translate his critique of London society, which the editor accepts. The New York Times described it as a "delightfully wicked satire." However, in the view of the Spectator, it failed the obligation of the satirist which is to be "superlatively clever".

Besides his books, Scaife contributed miscellaneous stories and poems to magazines and newspapers. In the 1910s, he sent journalism to newspapers in England and British Columbia. He was still writing poetry in his final decade.

== Works ==
=== Fiction ===
- Three Letters of Credit and Other Stories (1894)
- As it Was in the Fifties (1895)
- Gemini and Lesser Lights (1895)

=== Poetry ===
- The Soliloquy of a Shadow-Shape on a Holiday from Hades (1900)

=== Non-fiction ===
- The War to Date (1900)

== Sources ==
- Bringhurst, Robert (1984). Ocean, Paper, Stone: The catalogue of an exhibition of printed objects which chronicle more than a century of literary publishing in British Columbia. William Hoffer. ISBN 0-919758-07-X.
- Morgan, Henry James (1898). The Canadian Men and Women of the Time: A Hand-book of Canadian Biography. Toronto: William Briggs. p. 912 – via HathiTrust.
- Watters, Reginald Eyre (1972). A Checklist of Canadian Literature and Background Materials 1628-1960 (2nd ed.). Toronto and Buffalo: University of Toronto Press. ISBN 0-8020-1866-1.
- Zilm, Glennis (1981). "First Fiction". Early B.C. Books: An Overview of Trade Book Publishing in British Columbia in the 1800s with Checklists and Selected Bibliography Related to British Columbiana (M.A. Thesis). Simon Fraser University. Archived from the original on 8 October 2023.
