= Zak Jones (writer) =

American-Canadian writer

Zak Jones is an American-Canadian writer, who won the Atwood Gibson Writers' Trust Fiction Prize in 2026 for his novel Fancy Gap.

Born and raised in North Carolina, Jones currently lives in Toronto, Ontario, where he is a dual citizen and a doctoral student at the University of Toronto.

He previously won the RBC Bronwen Wallace Award for Emerging Writers in 2023 for his short story "So Much More to Say".
