= Kathy Friedman =

South African-born Canadian writer

Kathy Friedman is a South African-born Canadian writer, whose debut short story collection All the Shining People was published in 2022. The stories in All the Shining People centre on characters in the Jewish community in Toronto, principally the South African Jewish community.

The book was a shortlisted finalist for the 2023 Danuta Gleed Literary Award, and the 2023 Trillium Book Award for English Prose.

An MFA graduate of the University of Guelph, she was previously shortlisted for the RBC Bronwen Wallace Award for Emerging Writers in 2011 for her short story "Under the 'I'".
