= Timothy J. Anderson =

Canadian opera singer

Timothy J. Anderson is a writer, classical singer, actor and composer.

Anderson graduated from the Carleton School of Journalism, and has written professionally for the stage and television. He was a librettist-in-residence with the Canadian Opera Company in 1988/89 working with Denis Gougeon. He was an editor with "The Books Collective" from 1994 until 2005, when it was closed. In 2007, he won the inaugural BookTelevision reality TV show based on the 3-Day Novel. Stage credits include performing in the original Canadian cast of Phantom of the Opera. He has performed in "opera, oratorio and musicals across Canada, Singapore, Hong Kong, and Carnegie Hall in New York". He has worked extensively with theater and opera for young audiences, including "an adaptation of Beauty and the Beast for which he wrote both text and music". In 2012, he wrote a play based on research into moral distress in pediatric intensive care teams; Anderson then adapted the play to film and released in 2014.

== Bibliography ==
- Neurotic Erotica (poetry) Slipstream Books, 1996
- Resisting Adonis (sci-fi thriller) Tesseract Books, 2000
  - Echoing Narcissus and Invoking Venus have been listed as forthcoming sequels.
- I want to be your sex symbol (essay) in Biotechnological and Medical Themes in Science Fiction ed. Domna Pastourmatzi, 2002
- "Newbie Wrangler" (short story) Tesseracts Nine from Tesseract Books and Year's Best Fantasy 6 eds Hartwell & Cramer for Tachyon
- Singapore 1995 (short non-fiction) Slice Me Some Truth, eds. Armstrong & Landale, 2011
- Just Keep Breathing (play), 2012
- Just Keep Breathing (film) Idea Factory/University of Alberta, 2014
