= Matthew Tierney (poet) =

Canadian poet (born 1970)

Matthew F. Tierney (born November 9, 1970) is a Canadian poet.

Tierney was born in Kitchener, Ontario. After originally studying in the sciences and dabbling in the theatre, Tierney received a B.A. in English from the University of Toronto and an M.A. in Creative Writing from the University of New Brunswick. Since then, Tierney has published poems in several literary journals throughout Canada and Ireland.

Tierney was awarded the 2006 K.M. Hunter Artist Award for literature. Tierney also won both 1st place and 2nd place in This Magazine's 2005 Great Literary Hunt and first place in Maisonneuve magazine's 2006 literary competition.

Tierney is the author of the full collections The Hayflick Limit, Full Speed Through the Morning Dark, Probably Inevitable, Midday at the Super-Kamiokande, Lossless, the chapbook Trans-Mongolian Express, and the thesis novella Merely Players.

The Hayflick Limit was nominated for the 2010 Trillium Book Award for English Poetry. Tierney won the award for his third full collection, Probably Inevitable.

His 2018 collection Midday at the Super-Kamiokande was shortlisted for the 2019 ReLit Award for poetry.

Tierney lives in Toronto with his wife, Charmaine Lau Tierney and their son, August.

== Bibliography ==
- Full Speed Through the Morning Dark. Toronto: Wolsak & Wynn, 2004. ISBN 0-919897-97-5
- The Hayflick Limit. Toronto: Coach House, 2009. ISBN 978-1-55245-217-2.
- Probably Inevitable. Toronto: Coach House, 2012. ISBN 9781552452615.
- Midday at the Super-Kamiokande. Toronto: Coach House, 2018. ISBN 9781552453773.
- Lossless, Toronto: Coach House, 2024.
