= Vincent Anioke =

Nigerian-Canadian writer

- Born: Enugu
- Citizenship: Nigerian; Canadian
- Notable work: Perfect Little Angel
- Website: https://vincentanioke.com/about

Vincent Anioke is a Nigerian-Canadian writer, whose debut short story collection Perfect Little Angels was a finalist for the 2024 Dayne Ogilvie Prize for debut books by Canadian LGBTQ writers, and the 2025 Danuta Gleed Literary Award.

Born and raised in Enugu, Nigeria, he published the novel Whirlwind of Metamorphosis in 2014 before moving to the United States to study electrical engineering and computer science at the Massachusetts Institute of Technology. He currently lives in Waterloo, Ontario, where he is employed as a software engineer with Google.

He was shortlisted for the African division of the Commonwealth Short Story Prize in 2021 for "Ogbuefi", and the RBC Bronwen Wallace Award for Emerging Writers in 2023 for "Mama's Lullabies". He has also been longlisted on three occasions for the CBC Short Story Prize.
