= Zalika Reid-Benta =

Canadian writer

- Born: Toronto, Ontario, Canada
- Education: University of Toronto (BA); Columbia University (MFA)
- Occupation: Author
- Writing career
- Notable works: Frying Plantain; River Mumma

Zalika Reid-Benta is a Canadian author. Her debut novel River Mumma was a finalist for the 2024 Trillium Book Award and her debut short story collection Frying Plantain won the 2019 Danuta Gleed Literary Award and 2020 Kobo Emerging Writer Prize.

River Mumma is a magical realism novel inspired by Jamaican folklore. The main character, Alicia Gale, is a young Black woman having a quarter-life crisis while adventuring through the streets of Toronto, Ontario. It received a starred review from Publishers Weekly and was listed as one of the best fiction books of 2023 by CBC Books.

Frying Plantain is a collection of linked short stories centering on the coming of age of Kara Davis, a young Jamaican-Canadian girl growing up in the Little Jamaica neighbourhood of Toronto.

== Early life and education ==
Reid-Benta grew up in Toronto. She graduated from the University of Toronto with an Hons. Bachelor of Arts in English and cinema studies and with a minor in Caribbean studies. She then received a Master of Fine Arts from Columbia University with a concentration in fiction.

In 2017 she attended the Writing Studio at the Banff Center for Arts and Creativity and was a 2010 John Gardner Fiction Fellow at the Bread Loaf Writers' Conference. She was mentored by writers Victor LaValle, George Elliott Clarke, Janice Galloway, and Olive Senior.

=== Influences ===
Reid-Benta describes Toni Morrison as one of her literary heroes. Reid-Benta has also described Annie John by Jamaica Kincaid, Bastard out of Carolina by Dorothy Allison, and Purple Hibiscus by Chimamanda Ngozi Adiche as inspirations. In an interview about River Mumma with Library Journal, Reid-Benta mentioned Nalo Hopkinson, Octavia Butler, and Cherie Dimaline as some of her favourite science fiction and fantasy writers.

== Accolades ==
Year	Nominated work	Award	Category	Result	Ref.
2019	Frying Plantain	Giller Prize		Longlist	
2019	Frying Plantain	Danuta Gleed Literary Award		Winner	
2020	Frying Plantain	Kobo Emerging Writer Prize		Winner	
2020	Frying Plantain	Toronto Book Awards		Shortlist	
2020	Frying Plantain	Trillium Book Awards	English	Shortlist	
2020	Frying Plantain	Forest of Reading Awards	Evergreen Award	Shortlist	
2021	Frying Plantain	Forest of Reading Awards	White Pine Award	Shortlist	
2024	River Mumma	Trillium Book Awards	English	Shortlist	
