= Oakland Ross =

Canadian journalist and writer

Oakland Ross (born 1952) is a Canadian journalist and writer. He is most noted for his short story collection Guerrilla Beach, which was a shortlisted Trillium Book Award nominee for English Literature in 1995.

He began his career in journalism as an editor of Excalibur, the student newspaper at York University, in the 1970s, before joining the editorial board of The Globe and Mail in 1976. In that role, he wrote extensively about the issue of child abuse in Canadian child protection services, for which the paper won a Michener Award for public service journalism in 1978. He was appointed the paper's assistant editor in 1978, and was appointed to head up the newspaper's new Latin American bureau in 1980. He later served for several years as the paper's foreign correspondent in Africa.

He won two National Newspaper Awards during his time with The Globe and Mail, for editorial writing in 1980 and a citation of merit enterprise reporting, for his series of articles on a battle between Nicaraguan army units and insurgents, in 1984.

After leaving The Globe and Mail in 1990, he published Guerrilla Beach in 1994 as his fiction debut. The following year he published A Fire on the Mountains: Exploring the Human Spirit from Mexico to Madagascar, a memoir of his experiences as a foreign correspondent. In 1996 he won a National Magazine Award for his short story "Good Luck and Cheerio", published in The New Quarterly.

In 2001 he published the novel The Dark Virgin. He briefly returned to journalism as a Middle East correspondent for the Toronto Star in the 2000s, winning another National Newspaper Award in 2004. After leaving that role, he published two further novels, The Empire of Yearning in 2013 and Swimming with Horses in 2019.

== Books ==
- Guerrilla Beach - 1994
- A Fire on the Mountains: Exploring the Human Spirit from Mexico to Madagascar - 1995
- The Dark Virgin - 2001
- The Empire of Yearning - 2013
- Swimming with Horses - 2019
