= Kevin Hardcastle =

Canadian fiction writer (born 1980)

- Born: August 8, 1980 (age 46)
- Occupations: novelist, short stories
- Writing career
- Period: 2010s-present
- Notable work: Debris

Kevin Hardcastle (born August 8, 1980) is a Canadian fiction writer, whose debut short story collection Debris won the Trillium Book Award in 2016 and the ReLit Award for Short Fiction in 2017. The collection, published by Biblioasis in 2015, was also shortlisted for the Danuta Gleed Literary Award and the Kobo Emerging Writer Prize, and was named a best book of the year by Quill and Quire.

== Early life and education ==
Originally from Midland, Ontario, he studied writing at the University of Toronto and Cardiff University.

== Writing career ==
His short story "To Have to Wait" was a finalist for the 2012 Journey Prize, a prize awarded to the best short story by an emerging Canadian writer. His story "Old Man Marchuk" was included in the Journey Prize Anthology in 2014, and later in Best Canadian Stories 15. His writing has also appeared in publications including Word Riot, subTerrain, The Malahat Review, The Fiddlehead, The New Quarterly, Prism International, Event, Joyland, Shenandoah and The Walrus.

His first novel, In the Cage, was published by Biblioasis in September 2017.

== Publications ==
- Debris (2015, collection of short stories ISBN 978-1771960403)
- In the Cage (2017, novel)
- "To Have to Wait" (Short story)
- "Old Man Marchuk" (Short story)
