= Robert Hough (author) =

Canadian author (born 1963)

Robert Hough is a Canadian author. Hough graduated from Queen's University at Kingston in 1985. Following a career as a free-lance magazine journalist, Hough published his first novel titled The Final Confession of Mabel Stark, in 2001.

== Published works ==
- The Final Confession of Mabel Stark (2001). Toronto: Random House of Canada. ISBN 0-679-31091-6. A novel about female-tiger trainer Mabel Stark, it was published in fifteen countries in a dozen languages. It was nominated for the Commonwealth Writer's Prize and The Trillium Award.
- The Stowaway (2004). Toronto: Random House of Canada. ISBN 0-679-31146-7. Published internationally, it was listed on The Boston Globe's Top Ten Books of the Year and was nominated for the International Dublin Literary Award.
- The Culprits (2007). Toronto: Random House of Canada. ISBN 978-0-307-35564-5. A satire about global warfare, the novel was nominated for the Commonwealth Writer's Prize, Rogers Writers' Trust Fiction Prize and The Trillium Award.
- Dr. Brinkley's Tower (2012) Toronto: House of Anansi. ISBN 978-0-88784-319-8. The story of a charlatan's construction of a million-watt radio tower in a small Mexican community, the novel functions as a satire on imperialism and American intervention. It was nominated for the Governor General's Award, and long-listed for the Giller Prize.
- The Man Who Saved Henry Morgan (2015) Toronto: House of Anansi. ISBN 978-1-77089-945-2 An illiterate board game hustler forms an unlikely friendship with the famous privateer, Henry Morgan. It was nominated for the Trillium Award.
- Anarchists in Love (2025) Douglas and McIntyre. ISBN 978-1771624473 Fictionalized story of the relationship of Emma Goldman and Alexander "Sasha" Berkman.
