= Shashi Bhat =

Canadian writer

Shashi Bhat is a Canadian writer. Her 2021 novel The Most Precious Substance on Earth was a shortlisted finalist for the Governor General's Award for English-language fiction at the 2022 Governor General's Awards.

Her debut novel, The Family Took Shape, was published in 2013. Bhat was a finalist for the RBC Bronwen Wallace Award for Emerging Writers in 2010, and won the Journey Prize in 2018 for her short story "Mute".

Originally from Richmond Hill, Ontario, she is a graduate of Johns Hopkins University, and is currently a professor of creative writing at Douglas College.

Her short story collection Death by a Thousand Cuts was longlisted for the 2024 Giller Prize, and shortlisted for the 2025 Danuta Gleed Literary Award. It won the Ethel Wilson Fiction Prize.
