= Jen Neale =

Canadian writer

- Education: University of British Columbia
- Occupation: Writer
- Writing career
- Language: English
- Genre: fiction
- Notable works: Land Mammals and Sea Creatures
- Notable awards: RBC Bronwen Wallace Award for Emerging Writers (2012)

Jen Neale is a Canadian writer, whose debut novel Land Mammals and Sea Creatures was a shortlisted finalist for the Rogers Writers' Trust Fiction Prize in 2018.

An MFA graduate of the creative writing program at the University of British Columbia, she previously won the RBC Bronwen Wallace Award for Emerging Writers in 2012 for her short story "Elk-Headed Man".
