= RBC Bronwen Wallace Award for Emerging Writers =

Canadian literary award

The RBC Bronwen Wallace Award for Emerging Writers is a Canadian literary award, presented annually by the Writers' Trust of Canada to a writer who has not yet published his or her first book. Formerly restricted to writers under age 35, the age limit was removed in 2021, with the prize now open to emerging writers regardless of age.

Named in memory of Bronwen Wallace, a Canadian writer who died of cancer in 1989, the award was created in 1994 by her literary executor Carolyn Smart to honour Wallace's work as a creative writing instructor and mentor to young writers. The Royal Bank of Canada stepped in as the award's corporate sponsor in 2012, through its Emerging Artists Project.

The prize has a monetary value of $10,000, with finalists receiving $2,500. The prize formerly alternated every other year between poetry and short fiction; in 2020 the Writers' Trust announced that they would present annual awards in both categories. In October 2024, the Writers' Trust announced that a third award category for creative non-fiction will be added to the awards in 2025.

== Winners ==
Note that at present, the Writers Trust's awards database does not provide the titles of winning or nominated works prior to 2008. Before that date, titles are provided below where known from other sources; from 2008 on, all titles are listed.

| Year | Author | Title | Category | Ref |
|---|---|---|---|---|
| 1994 | Michael Crummey | | Poetry | |
| 1994 | Nancy Jo Cullen | | Poetry | |
| 1994 | Tonja Gunvaldsen Klaassen | | Poetry | |
| 1994 | Noah Leznoff | | Poetry | |
| 1995 | Adele Megann | | Short fiction | |
| 1995 | Natalee Caple | | Short fiction | |
| 1995 | Denise Ryan | | Short fiction | |
| 1996 | Stephanie Bolster | | Poetry | |
| 1996 | Jacqueline Larson | | Poetry | |
| 1996 | Shannon Stewart | | Poetry | |
| 1997 | Rachel Rose | | Short fiction | |
| 1997 | Gail Andrews | | Short fiction | |
| 1997 | Alan Levin | | Short fiction | |
| 1997 | Oscar Martens | | Short fiction | |
| 1997 | Tanya Palmer | | Short fiction | |
| 1997 | Elizabeth Moret Ross | | Short fiction | |
| 1998 | Talya Rubin | "Ariadne's Thread" | Poetry | |
| 1998 | Sarah de Leeuw | | Poetry | |
| 1998 | Astrid van der Pol | | Poetry | |
| 1999 | Alissa York | "Any Given Power" | Short fiction | |
| 1999 | Elaine O'Connor | | Short fiction | |
| 1999 | Madeleine Thien | | Short fiction | |
| 2000 | Sonnet L'Abbé | | Poetry | |
| 2000 | Ceiran Bishop | | Poetry | |
| 2000 | Erina Harris | | Poetry | |
| 2000 | Anita Lahey | | Poetry | |
| 2001 | Valerie Stetson | "The Year I Got Impatient" | Short fiction | |
| 2001 | Melanie Jessica Little | | Short fiction | |
| 2001 | Robert McGill | | Short fiction | |
| 2001 | Tanis Rideout | | Short fiction | |
| 2001 | Padma Viswanathan | | Short fiction | |
| 2002 | Alison Pick | | Poetry | |
| 2002 | Alison Calder | | Poetry | |
| 2002 | Seema Goel | | Poetry | |
| 2003 | Gillian Best | "Seamus & Lloyd" | Short fiction | |
| 2003 | Kelly Dignan | | Short fiction | |
| 2003 | Nathan Whitlock | | Short fiction | |
| 2004 | Alison Calder | "Wolf Tree" | Poetry | |
| 2004 | Elizabeth Bachinsky | "Home of Sudden Service" | Poetry | |
| 2004 | Suzanne Hancock | | Poetry | |
| 2004 | David Hickey | | Poetry | |
| 2004 | Anna Swanson | | Poetry | |
| 2005 | Nicole Dixon | "High Watermark" | Short fiction | |
| 2005 | Amy Jones | | Short fiction | |
| 2005 | Angela Long | | Short fiction | |
| 2006 | Jeramy Dodds | "Planning Your Seascape" | Poetry | |
| 2006 | Michael Reynolds | | Poetry | |
| 2006 | Bren Simmers | | Poetry | |
| 2007 | No award presented due to change in award scheduling. | | | |
| 2008 | Marjorie Celona | "Othello" | Short fiction | |
| 2008 | Ben Lof | "When in the Field with Her at His Back" | Short fiction | |
| 2008 | Grace O'Connell | "The Bottlenecks" | Short fiction | |
| 2009 | Emily McGiffin | "Wokkpash and Other Poems" | Poetry | |
| 2009 | Michael Johnson | "The Minnow and Other Poems" | Poetry | |
| 2009 | Jeff Latosik | "How the Tiklaalik Came Onto Land and Other Poems" | Poetry | |
| 2010 | Kilby Smith-McGregor | "The Bird in Hand" | Short fiction | |
| 2010 | Shashi Bhat | "Indian Cooking" | Short fiction | |
| 2010 | Claire Tacon | "Dumb Dog" | Short fiction | |
| 2011 | Garth Martens | "Inheritance and Other Poems" | Poetry | |
| 2011 | Raoul Fernandes | "By Way of Explanation" | Poetry | |
| 2011 | Anne-Marie Turza | "The Quiet III" | Poetry | |
| 2012 | Jen Neale | "Elk-Headed Man" | Short fiction | |
| 2012 | Dina Del Bucchia | "At the Bottom of the Garden" | Short fiction | |
| 2012 | Kathy Friedman | "Under the 'I'" | Short fiction | |
| 2013 | Laura Clarke | "Mule Variations" | Poetry | |
| 2013 | Laura Matwichuk | "Here Comes the Future" | Poetry | |
| 2013 | Suzannah Showler | "The Reason and Other Poems" | Poetry | |
| 2014 | Erin Frances Fisher | "Girl" | Short fiction | |
| 2014 | Leah Jane Esau | "Dream Interpretation" | Short fiction | |
| 2014 | Jakub Stachurski | "Screen Capture" | Short fiction | |
| 2015 | Alessandra Naccarato | "Re-Origin of Species" | Poetry | |
| 2015 | Irfan Ali | "Who I Think About When I Think About You" | Poetry | |
| 2015 | Chuqiao Yang | "Roads Home" | Poetry | |
| 2016 | Brendan Bowles | "Wyatt Thurst" | Short fiction | |
| 2016 | Allegra McKenzie | "This Monstrous Heart" | Short fiction | |
| 2016 | Hannah Rahimi | "With My Scarf Tied Just So" | Short fiction | |
| 2017 | Noor Naga | "The Mistress and the Pig" | Poetry | |
| 2017 | Tyler Engström | "after thoughts" | Poetry | |
| 2017 | Domenica Martinello | "All Day I Dream About Sirens" | Poetry | |
| 2018 | Maria Reva | "The Ermine Coat" | Short fiction | |
| 2018 | Sarah Christina Brown | "Kingdom Come" | Short fiction | |
| 2018 | Khalida Hassan | "Adjacent Rooms" | Short fiction | |
| 2019 | John Elizabeth Stintzi | "Selections from Junebat" | Poetry | |
| 2019 | Rebecca Salazar | "Your Public Body" | Poetry | |
| 2019 | Ellie Sawatzky | "Unorganized Territory" | Poetry | |
| 2020 | Leah Mol | "Six Things My Father Taught Me About Bears" | Short fiction | |
| 2020 | Jamaluddin Aram | "This Hard Easy Life" | Short fiction | |
| 2020 | Omer Friedlander | "Palestinian Still Life" | Short fiction | |
| 2020 | Alexa Winik | "Selections from Winter Stars Visible in December" | Poetry | |
| 2020 | nina jane drystek | "C;ode" | Poetry | |
| 2020 | Zoe Imani Sharpe | "Selection from [CA$H4GOLD]" | Poetry | |
| 2021 | Anna Ling Kaye | "East City" | Short fiction | |
| 2021 | Carolyn Chung | "Bright Fish, Dead Bird" | Short fiction | |
| 2021 | Joshua Wales | "Mass Effect" | Short fiction | |
| 2021 | Zehra Naqvi | "The Knot of My Tongue" | Poetry | |
| 2021 | Jessica Bebenek | "Selections from No One Knows Us There" | Poetry | |
| 2021 | Hannah Green | "XANAX COWBOY" | Poetry | |
| 2022 | Teya Hollier | "Watching, Waiting" | Short Fiction | |
| 2022 | Jen Batler | "Ectopia Cordis" | Short Fiction | |
| 2022 | Emily Paskevics | "Wild Girls" | Short Fiction | |
| 2022 | Patrick James Errington | "If Fire, Then Bird" | Poetry | |
| 2022 | Eimear Laffan | "My Life, Delimited" | Poetry | |
| 2022 | Christine Wu | "Familial Hungers" | Poetry | |
| 2023 | Zak Jones | "So Much More to Say" | Short fiction | |
| 2023 | Vincent Anioke | "Mama’s Lullabies" | Short fiction | |
| 2023 | Zilla Jones | "Triggered" | Short fiction | |
| 2023 | Cooper Skjeie | "Scattered Oblations" | Poetry | |
| 2023 | Kyo Lee | "diasporic dissonance" | Poetry | |
| 2023 | Dora Prieto | "Notes on the Non-Place" | Poetry | |
| 2024 | Nayani Jensen | "Like Rabbits" | Short fiction | |
| 2024 | Henry Heavyshield | "Our Rez Anomaly" | Short fiction | |
| 2024 | Reid Kerr-Keller | "On Venlafaxine and Ghosts" | Short fiction | |
| 2024 | Faith Paré | "Selections from 'a fine African Head'" | Poetry | |
| 2024 | Ashleigh A. Allen | "balcony buffalo" | Poetry | |
| 2024 | Sneha Subramanian Kanta | "Hiraeth" | Poetry | |
| 2025 | Jess Goldman | "Tombstone of a Tsaddik" | Short Fiction | |
| 2025 | Alexis Lachaîne | "Three New France Suicides" | Short Fiction | |
| 2025 | Hana Mason | "Training the Replacement" | Short Fiction | |
| 2025 | Dora Prieto | "Loose Threads" | Poetry | |
| 2025 | Cicely Grace | "Rather Her Clean" | Poetry | |
| 2025 | Nicole Mae | "Prairie Bog" | Poetry | |
| 2025 | Phillip Dwight Morgan | "White Trucks and Mergansers" | Creative Nonfiction | |
| 2025 | Huyền Trân | "Where Do Mothers Go" | Creative Nonfiction | |
| 2025 | Graham Slaughter | "Breach" | Creative Nonfiction | |
| 2026 | Julia Cottrelle | "The Old Turtle Climb" | Short Fiction | |
| 2026 | Rebecca Peng | "The Department of Unjust Histories" | Short Fiction | |
| 2026 | Dilan Qadir | "Interpreter of Afflictions" | Short Fiction | |
| 2026 | Renato Gandia | "Psalmody for the Estranged" | Poetry | |
| 2026 | Jeremy Audet | "Earth Gigantic" | Poetry | |
| 2026 | Rachel Robb | Bugonia, Bugonia and Other Poems | Poetry | |
| 2026 | Graham Slaughter | "The Perfect Home for Your Child" | Creative Nonfiction | |
| 2026 | Katie Lawrence | "Paint Job" | Creative Nonfiction | |
| 2026 | Erin Soros | "You Have to Live Long and Be Happy" | Creative Nonfiction | |
