= Nina Dunic =

Canadian writer and journalist (born 1983)

- Born: Nina Dragicevic c. 1983; Belgrade, Yugoslavia
- Education: University of Toronto; Centennial College
- Occupations: Novelist; Short story writer; Journalist
- Writing career
- Notable work: The Clarion
- Notable awards: Trillium Book Award (2024)
- Website: ninadunic.com

Nina Dunic (born c.1983) is the pen name of Nina Dragicevic, a Canadian writer and journalist whose debut novel The Clarion was longlisted for the 2023 Giller Prize, and won the 2024 Trillium Book Award. A freelance journalist under her own name, she has been a two-time winner of the Toronto Star's annual short story contest.

== Biography ==
Dunic was born in Belgrade, Serbia, and brought to Toronto, Canada, as an infant. She spent her early years in the Toronto suburb of Scarborough and Pickering. She first enrolled at the University of Toronto, and then graduated in journalism from Centennial College.

In 2026, her book Suddenly Light was longlisted for the Carol Shields Prize for Fiction, and the Trillium Book Award for English Prose. The book was also named An Apple Books Best Book of 2025 and A Necessary Fiction Best Book of 2025. CBC Books included Dunic on its 2023 List: Writers to Watch.

== Bibliography ==
- The Clarion (2023)
- Suddenly Light (2025)
