= Gil Adamson =

Canadian writer

Gillian "Gil" Adamson
- Born: 1961 (age 64–65) North York, Toronto, Canada
- Occupation: Author, publisher
- Language: English
- Education: University of Toronto
- Years active: 1985–? (publishing); 1991–present (author)
- Notable awards: Hammett Prize (2007); ReLit Award (2008); Amazon.ca First Novel Award (2008)
- Partner: Kevin Connolly

Gillian "Gil" Adamson (born January 1, 1961) is a Canadian writer. She won the Books in Canada First Novel Award in 2008 for her 2007 novel The Outlander.

== Biography ==
Adamson's first published work was Primitive, a volume of poetry, in 1991. She followed this with the short story collection Help Me, Jacques Cousteau in 1995, a commissioned fan biography of Gillian Anderson, Mulder, It's Me, which she co-authored with her sister-in-law, Dawn Connolly, in 1997, a second volume of poetry, Ashland, in 2003, as well a number of chapbooks. A selection of her poetry appeared in the anthology Surreal Estate: 13 Canadian Poets Under the Influence (The Mercury Press, 2004). The Outlander, a novel set in the Canadian West at the turn of the 20th century, was published by House of Anansi in spring 2007 and won the Hammett Prize that year. The novel was later selected for the 2009 edition of Canada Reads, where it was championed by the actor Nicholas Campbell.

Her novel Ridgerunner was published in May 2020. It won the Writers' Trust Fiction Prize and was shortlisted for the Giller Prize.

Adamson lives in Toronto with the poet Kevin Connolly.

== Awards ==
Awards for Adamson's writing
Year	Title	Award	Result	Ref.
2004	Ashland	ReLit Award for Novel	Shortlist	
2008	The Outlander	Books in Canada First Novel Award	Winner	
2008	The Outlander	Hammett Prize	Winner	
2008	The Outlander	ReLit Award for Novel	Winner	
2020	Ridgerunner	Atwood Gibson Writers' Trust Fiction Prize	Winner	
2020	Ridgerunner	Giller Prize	Shortlist	

== Selected works ==
- —— (1991). Primitive. Coach House Press.
- —— (1995). Help Me, Jacques Cousteau. Porcupine's Quill.
- —— (1997). Mulder, It's Me. ECW Press.
- —— (2003). Ashland. ECW Press.
- —— (2007). The Outlander. House of Anansi.
- —— (2020). Ridgerunner. House of Anansi.

== See also ==
- Canadian literature
- Canadian poetry
- List of Canadian poets
- List of Canadian writers
