= Saeed Teebi =

Saeed Teebi is a Palestinian Canadian writer, whose debut short story collection Her First Palestinian was published in 2022.

Born to Palestinian expatriate parents in Kuwait, Teebi emigrated with his family, first to the United States, then to Canada, where he has lived since 1993. He resides in Toronto, Ontario, where he works as a lawyer.

Her First Palestinian was shortlisted for the 2022 Atwood Gibson Writers' Trust Fiction Prize, and was a runner-up the 2023 Danuta Gleed Literary Award.

In September 2025 Teebi published his second book, a work of non-fiction, You Will Not Kill Our Imagination: A Memoir of Palestine and Writing in Dark Times. It was shortlisted for the Trillium Book Award for English Prose in 2026 and the 2026 Governor General's Award.

Teebi’s nonfiction has also appeared in The Globe and Mail and The New Quarterly. He served as the 2024/2025 Writer-in-Residence at the University of Western Ontario.
