= Rebecca Rosenblum =

Canadian author (born 1978)

- Born: May 23, 1978 (age 48); Hamilton, Ontario, Canada
- Occupation: Author
- Website: www.rebeccarosenblum.com

Rebecca Rosenblum (born May 23, 1978) is a Canadian author best known for her short stories.

== Life ==
Rosenblum was born in Hamilton, Ontario. She attended McGill University and received her Honours Bachelor of English in 2001, and in 2007 she graduated from the University of Toronto with a Master of Arts in English and Creative Writing.

== Writing career ==
In November 2007, Rosenblum was awarded the Metcalf-Rooke Award, an award for unpublished manuscripts established by Canadian publisher Biblioasis. Rosenblum won the award for Once, a collection of short stories, which was published by Biblioasis on September 15, 2008.

In February 2008, Rosenblum's story "Chilly Girl" was announced as one of three finalists for the 2007 Writers' Trust of Canada/McClelland & Stewart Journey Prize, awarded annually to a new and developing writer of distinction for a short story published in a Canadian literary journal in the previous year. In Spring 2009, Rosenblum was a juror for the Journey Prize 21.

In May 2009, Once was one of three finalists for the Danuta Gleed Literary Award. In the summer of that year, Once was longlisted for the Relit Award. A story from the collection, "Linh Lai", was shortlisted for the Canadian National Magazine Awards in the fiction category.

Her second book, The Big Dream (September 2011), is a collection of linked short stories set at a fictional Toronto magazine publisher. It was longlisted for the Frank O'Connor International Short Story Award.

In March 2017, Rosenblum released her first novel, So Much Love. The story of the abduction of a young poet, Catherine Reindeer, it is narrated by multiple characters associated with the event. It was shortlisted for the Amazon Canada First Novel Award and the Trillium Award and translated into French and Polish.

== Works ==
- Introduction to Journey Prize Stories 21 (as one of three jurors in the contest). Toronto: McClelland and Stewart, October 2009.
- "ContEd" and "Tech Support" (short stories) Fiddlehead #240. Fredericton: Summer 2009.
- "Bold Statements" (review) Canadian Notes and Queries #76. Emeryville: Summer 2009.
- "Stuff They Wrote" (essay) The New Quarterly #110. Waterloo: Spring 2009.
- "Night Flight" (short story) echolocation #8. Toronto: Spring 2009.
- "Hello Hello" (short story) Rampike. Windsor: Fall 2008.
- "Tech Support," "ContEd," and "The House on Elsbeth" (short stories) Coming Attractions. Ottawa: Oberon Press, Fall, 2008.
- "Black-and-White Man" (short story) Joyland. Toronto: September 2008.
- "The House on Elsbeth," "Zoom," and "Linh Lai" (short stories) The New Quarterly 107. Waterloo: Summer 2008.
- "The Weatherboy" (short story) echolocation #7. Toronto: May 2008.
- "Wall of Sound" (short story) Exile Quarterly 31.4. Toronto: March 2008.
- "Missing (MF)" (short story) Qwerty Spring 2007. Fredericton: Summer 2007.
- "Fruit Factory" (short story) The New Quarterly #102. Waterloo: April 2007 -- . Best Canadian Stories. Ottawa: Oberon Press, Fall 2008.
- "At the End of Breath" (short story) Ars Medica, Vol. 3, No. 2. Toronto: Spring 2007.
- "All the Ghostlies" (short story) Hart House Review 2007. Toronto: March 2007.
- "Dead Boyfriend Disco" (poem) echolocation #6. Toronto: February 2007.
- "Chilly Girl" (short story) Exile Quarterly 30.3. Toronto: December 2006. --. The Journey Prize Stories 19. Toronto: McClelland and Stewart, November 2007
- "Grade Nine Flight" (short story) The Danforth Review #17. Toronto: December 2006. Online.
