= Joyland (magazine) =

Digital and print literary journal

Joyland (formerly known as Joyland: A hub for short fiction) is a digital platform and print literary journal. It was created in 2008 by novelist Emily Schultz and filmmaker Brian Joseph Davis. Though based in New York, the publication's editorial network is distributed across North American cities and regions. Notable contributors have included Jonathan Lethem, Lydia Millet, and Chris Kraus. It was an early publisher to authors Roxane Gay, Sean Gill, Amelia Gray, Rachel Khong, and Ottessa Moshfegh.

In 2016 Joyland was merged with Schultz and Davis's Heroic Collective Media, and new publishers, Kyle Lucia Wu and Lisa Locascio, were hired to oversee editorial and development. Since then Joyland has founded the "Bad Women" panel series for female writers and filmmakers, and its stories and authors have been profiled by Huffington Post and Lenny Letter. Joyland has also launched an annual fiction prize called the Open Border Fiction Prize. Amelia Gray judged the prize in 2017, Rachel Khong in 2018.
