= Atwood Gibson Writers' Trust Fiction Prize =

Canadian fiction prize

The Atwood Gibson Writers' Trust Fiction Prize, formerly known as the Rogers Writers' Trust Fiction Prize, is a Canadian literary award presented by the Writers' Trust of Canada after an annual juried competition of works submitted by publishers. Alongside the Governor General's Award for English-language fiction and the Giller Prize, it is considered one of the three main awards for Canadian fiction in English. Its eligibility criteria allow for it to garland collections of short stories as well as novels; works that were originally written and published in French are also eligible for the award when they appear in English translation.

The award was first presented in 1997. It was renamed in January 2021, in order to honour the Canadian writers Margaret Atwood and Graeme Gibson. Concurrently with the renaming, the prize package was increased from $50,000 to $60,000, matching the amount currently presented by its sibling, the Hilary Weston Writers' Trust Prize for Nonfiction. The prize is sponsored by Jim Balsillie.

== Nominees and recipients ==
Year	Jury	Author	Title	Result	Ref.
1997	Matt Cohen Elisabeth Harvor Ann Ireland	Austin Clarke	The Origin of Waves	Winner	
1997	Matt Cohen Elisabeth Harvor Ann Ireland	Elizabeth Hay	Small Change	Shortlist	
1997	Matt Cohen Elisabeth Harvor Ann Ireland	Brian Moore	The Magician's Wife	Shortlist	
1997	Matt Cohen Elisabeth Harvor Ann Ireland	Mordecai Richler	Barney's Version	Shortlist	
1997	Matt Cohen Elisabeth Harvor Ann Ireland	Jane Urquhart	The Underpainter	Shortlist	
1998	Joan Clark Austin Clarke Trevor Ferguson	Greg Hollingshead	The Healer	Winner	
1998	Joan Clark Austin Clarke Trevor Ferguson	André Alexis	Childhood	Shortlist	
1998	Joan Clark Austin Clarke Trevor Ferguson	Barbara Gowdy	The White Bone	Shortlist	
1998	Joan Clark Austin Clarke Trevor Ferguson	Wayne Johnston	The Colony of Unrequited Dreams	Shortlist	
1998	Joan Clark Austin Clarke Trevor Ferguson	Alice Munro	The Love of a Good Woman	Shortlist	
1999	Lynn Coady Sylvia Fraser Eric Wright	Peter Oliva	The City of Yes	Winner	
1999	Lynn Coady Sylvia Fraser Eric Wright	Caroline Adderson	A History of Forgetting	Shortlist	
1999	Lynn Coady Sylvia Fraser Eric Wright	Elyse Gasco	Can You Wave Bye Bye, Baby?	Shortlist	
1999	Lynn Coady Sylvia Fraser Eric Wright	Judy MacDonald	Jane	Shortlist	
1999	Lynn Coady Sylvia Fraser Eric Wright	Alistair MacLeod	No Great Mischief	Shortlist	
2000	Cynthia Holz Janice Kulyk Keefer Peter Oliva	Helen Humphreys	Afterimage	Winner	
2000	Cynthia Holz Janice Kulyk Keefer Peter Oliva	Todd Babiak	Choke Hold	Shortlist	
2000	Cynthia Holz Janice Kulyk Keefer Peter Oliva	Lynn Coady	Play the Monster Blind	Shortlist	
2000	Cynthia Holz Janice Kulyk Keefer Peter Oliva	Douglas Glover	16 Categories of Desire	Shortlist	
2000	Cynthia Holz Janice Kulyk Keefer Peter Oliva	Michael Winter	This All Happened	Shortlist	
2001	Lesley Choyce Eliza Clark Olive Senior	Margaret Sweatman	When Alice Lay Down with Peter	Winner	
2001	Lesley Choyce Eliza Clark Olive Senior	Alice Munro	Hateship, Friendship, Courtship, Loveship, Marriage	Shortlist	
2001	Lesley Choyce Eliza Clark Olive Senior	Elizabeth Ruth	Ten Good Seconds of Silence	Shortlist	
2001	Lesley Choyce Eliza Clark Olive Senior	Timothy Taylor	Stanley Park	Shortlist	
2001	Lesley Choyce Eliza Clark Olive Senior	Thomas Wharton	Salamander	Shortlist	
2002	Joan Barfoot Brian Brett Sarah Sheard	Paulette Jiles	Enemy Women	Winner	
2002	Joan Barfoot Brian Brett Sarah Sheard	Terry Griggs	Rogues' Wedding	Shortlist	
2002	Joan Barfoot Brian Brett Sarah Sheard	Ann Ireland	Exile	Shortlist	
2002	Joan Barfoot Brian Brett Sarah Sheard	Lori Lansens	Rush Home Road	Shortlist	
2002	Joan Barfoot Brian Brett Sarah Sheard	Nino Ricci	Testament	Shortlist	
2003	Kevin Chong Lisa Moore Diane Schoemperlen	Kevin Patterson	Country of Cold	Winner	
2003	Kevin Chong Lisa Moore Diane Schoemperlen	Jacqueline Baker	A Hard Witching & Other Stories	Shortlist	
2003	Kevin Chong Lisa Moore Diane Schoemperlen	Gil Courtemanche	A Sunday at the Pool in Kigali	Shortlist	
2003	Kevin Chong Lisa Moore Diane Schoemperlen	Barbara Gowdy	The Romantic	Shortlist	
2003	Kevin Chong Lisa Moore Diane Schoemperlen	Judith McCormack	The Rule of Last Clear Chance	Shortlist	
2004	Sylvia Fraser Zsuzsi Gartner Michael Redhill	Alice Munro	Runaway	Winner	
2004	Sylvia Fraser Zsuzsi Gartner Michael Redhill	Michael Helm	In the Place of Last Things	Shortlist	
2004	Sylvia Fraser Zsuzsi Gartner Michael Redhill	Colin McAdam	Some Great Thing	Shortlist	
2004	Sylvia Fraser Zsuzsi Gartner Michael Redhill	Jeffrey Moore	The Memory Artists	Shortlist	
2004	Sylvia Fraser Zsuzsi Gartner Michael Redhill	Russell Smith	Muriella Pent	Shortlist	
2005	Anita Rau Badami Lewis DeSoto Mary Swan	Joseph Boyden	Three Day Road	Winner	
2005	Anita Rau Badami Lewis DeSoto Mary Swan	Michael Crummey	The Wreckage	Shortlist	
2005	Anita Rau Badami Lewis DeSoto Mary Swan	Lauren B. Davis	The Radiant City	Shortlist	
2005	Anita Rau Badami Lewis DeSoto Mary Swan	Allan Donaldson	Maclean	Shortlist	
2005	Anita Rau Badami Lewis DeSoto Mary Swan	Rabindranath Maharaj	A Perfect Pledge	Shortlist	
2006	Karen Connelly Jeffrey Moore Anna Porter	Kenneth J. Harvey	Inside	Winner	
2006	Karen Connelly Jeffrey Moore Anna Porter	Peter Behrens	The Law of Dreams	Shortlist	
2006	Karen Connelly Jeffrey Moore Anna Porter	Rawi Hage	De Niro's Game	Shortlist	
2006	Karen Connelly Jeffrey Moore Anna Porter	Catherine Hanrahan	Lost Girls and Love Hotels	Shortlist	
2006	Karen Connelly Jeffrey Moore Anna Porter	Mary Lawson	The Other Side of the Bridge	Shortlist	
2007	Kevin Major Kim Moritsugu Madeleine Thien	Lawrence Hill	The Book of Negroes	Winner	
2007	Kevin Major Kim Moritsugu Madeleine Thien	Shaena Lambert	Radiance	Shortlist	
2007	Kevin Major Kim Moritsugu Madeleine Thien	Robert Hough	The Culprits	Shortlist	
2007	Kevin Major Kim Moritsugu Madeleine Thien	Nancy Huston	Fault Lines	Shortlist	
2007	Kevin Major Kim Moritsugu Madeleine Thien	M.G. Vassanji	The Assassin's Song	Shortlist	
2008	Lawrence Hill Annabel Lyon Heather O'Neill	Miriam Toews	The Flying Troutmans	Winner	
2008	Lawrence Hill Annabel Lyon Heather O'Neill	Rivka Galchen	Atmospheric Disturbances	Shortlist	
2008	Lawrence Hill Annabel Lyon Heather O'Neill	Rawi Hage	Cockroach	Shortlist	
2008	Lawrence Hill Annabel Lyon Heather O'Neill	Lee Henderson	The Man Game	Shortlist	
2008	Lawrence Hill Annabel Lyon Heather O'Neill	Patrick Lane	Red Dog, Red Dog	Shortlist	
2009	Marina Endicott Miriam Toews R.M. Vaughan	Annabel Lyon	The Golden Mean	Winner	
2009	Marina Endicott Miriam Toews R.M. Vaughan	Nicole Brossard	Fences in Breathing	Shortlist	
2009	Marina Endicott Miriam Toews R.M. Vaughan	Douglas Coupland	Generation A	Shortlist	
2009	Marina Endicott Miriam Toews R.M. Vaughan	Alice Munro	Too Much Happiness	Shortlist	
2009	Marina Endicott Miriam Toews R.M. Vaughan	Andrew Steinmetz	Eva's Threepenny Theatre	Shortlist	
2010	Andrew Pyper Eden Robinson Lisa Moore	Emma Donoghue	Room	Winner	
2010	Andrew Pyper Eden Robinson Lisa Moore	Trevor Cole	Practical Jean	Shortlist	
2010	Andrew Pyper Eden Robinson Lisa Moore	Michael Helm	Cities of Refuge	Shortlist	
2010	Andrew Pyper Eden Robinson Lisa Moore	Kathleen Winter	Annabel	Shortlist	
2010	Andrew Pyper Eden Robinson Lisa Moore	Michael Winter	The Death of Donna Whalen	Shortlist	
2011	Emma Donoghue Rabindranath Maharaj Margaret Sweatman	Patrick deWitt	The Sisters Brothers	Winner	
2011	Emma Donoghue Rabindranath Maharaj Margaret Sweatman	Clark Blaise	The Meagre Tarmac	Shortlist	
2011	Emma Donoghue Rabindranath Maharaj Margaret Sweatman	Michael Christie	The Beggar's Garden	Shortlist	
2011	Emma Donoghue Rabindranath Maharaj Margaret Sweatman	Esi Edugyan	Half-Blood Blues	Shortlist	
2011	Emma Donoghue Rabindranath Maharaj Margaret Sweatman	Dan Vyleta	The Quiet Twin	Shortlist	
2012	Esi Edugyan Lynn Coady Drew Hayden Taylor	Tamas Dobozy	Siege 13	Winner	
2012	Esi Edugyan Lynn Coady Drew Hayden Taylor	Tim Bowling	The Tinsmith	Shortlist	
2012	Esi Edugyan Lynn Coady Drew Hayden Taylor	Rawi Hage	Carnival	Shortlist	
2012	Esi Edugyan Lynn Coady Drew Hayden Taylor	Alix Ohlin	Inside	Shortlist	
2012	Esi Edugyan Lynn Coady Drew Hayden Taylor	Linda Spalding	The Purchase	Shortlist	
2013	Caroline Adderson Alison Pick Miguel Syjuco	Colin McAdam	A Beautiful Truth	Winner	
2013	Caroline Adderson Alison Pick Miguel Syjuco	Krista Bridge	The Eliot Girls	Shortlist	
2013	Caroline Adderson Alison Pick Miguel Syjuco	Lynn Coady	Hellgoing	Shortlist	
2013	Caroline Adderson Alison Pick Miguel Syjuco	Cary Fagan	A Bird's Eye	Shortlist	
2013	Caroline Adderson Alison Pick Miguel Syjuco	Lisa Moore	Caught	Shortlist	
2014	Neil Bissoondath George Murray Helen Humphreys	Miriam Toews	All My Puny Sorrows	Winner	
2014	Neil Bissoondath George Murray Helen Humphreys	André Alexis	Pastoral	Shortlist	
2014	Neil Bissoondath George Murray Helen Humphreys	Steven Galloway	The Confabulist	Shortlist	
2014	Neil Bissoondath George Murray Helen Humphreys	K. D. Miller	All Saints	Shortlist	
2014	Neil Bissoondath George Murray Helen Humphreys	Carrie Snyder	Girl Runner	Shortlist	
2015	Aislinn Hunter Shani Mootoo Richard Wagamese	André Alexis	Fifteen Dogs	Winner	
2015	Aislinn Hunter Shani Mootoo Richard Wagamese	Elizabeth Hay	His Whole Life	Shortlist	
2015	Aislinn Hunter Shani Mootoo Richard Wagamese	Pamela Mordecai	Red Jacket	Shortlist	
2015	Aislinn Hunter Shani Mootoo Richard Wagamese	Russell Smith	Confidence	Shortlist	
2015	Aislinn Hunter Shani Mootoo Richard Wagamese	John Vaillant	The Jaguar's Children	Shortlist	
2016	Lauren B. Davis Trevor Ferguson Pasha Malla	Yasuko Thanh	Mysterious Fragrance of the Yellow Mountains	Winner	
2016	Lauren B. Davis Trevor Ferguson Pasha Malla	Michael Helm	After James	Shortlist	
2016	Lauren B. Davis Trevor Ferguson Pasha Malla	Anosh Irani	The Parcel	Shortlist	
2016	Lauren B. Davis Trevor Ferguson Pasha Malla	Kerry Lee Powell	Willem de Kooning's Paintbrush	Shortlist	
2016	Lauren B. Davis Trevor Ferguson Pasha Malla	Katherena Vermette	The Break	Shortlist	
2017	Michael Christie Christy Ann Conlin Tracey Lindberg	David Chariandy	Brother	Winner	
2017	Michael Christie Christy Ann Conlin Tracey Lindberg	Carleigh Baker	Bad Endings	Shortlist	
2017	Michael Christie Christy Ann Conlin Tracey Lindberg	Claire Cameron	The Last Neanderthal	Shortlist	
2017	Michael Christie Christy Ann Conlin Tracey Lindberg	Omar El Akkad	American War	Shortlist	
2017	Michael Christie Christy Ann Conlin Tracey Lindberg	Leanne Betasamosake Simpson	This Accident of Being Lost	Shortlist	
2018	Ann Y. K. Choi Mireille Silcoff Robert Wiersema	Kathy Page	Dear Evelyn	Winner	
2018	Ann Y. K. Choi Mireille Silcoff Robert Wiersema	Craig Davidson	The Saturday Night Ghost Club	Shortlist	
2018	Ann Y. K. Choi Mireille Silcoff Robert Wiersema	Esi Edugyan	Washington Black	Shortlist	
2018	Ann Y. K. Choi Mireille Silcoff Robert Wiersema	Rawi Hage	Beirut Hellfire Society	Shortlist	
2018	Ann Y. K. Choi Mireille Silcoff Robert Wiersema	Jen Neale	Land Mammals and Sea Creatures	Shortlist	
2019	Dennis Bock Michael Kaan Suzette Mayr	André Alexis	Days by Moonlight	Winner	
2019	Dennis Bock Michael Kaan Suzette Mayr	Sharon Butala	Season of Fury and Wonder	Shortlist	
2019	Dennis Bock Michael Kaan Suzette Mayr	Michael Crummey	The Innocents	Shortlist	
2019	Dennis Bock Michael Kaan Suzette Mayr	Téa Mutonji	Shut Up, You're Pretty	Shortlist	
2019	Dennis Bock Michael Kaan Suzette Mayr	Alix Ohlin	Dual Citizens	Shortlist	
2020	Elisabeth de Mariaffi Waubgeshig Rice Yasuko Thanh	Gil Adamson	Ridgerunner	Winner	
2020	Elisabeth de Mariaffi Waubgeshig Rice Yasuko Thanh	Zsuzsi Gartner	The Beguiling	Shortlist	
2020	Elisabeth de Mariaffi Waubgeshig Rice Yasuko Thanh	Michelle Good	Five Little Indians	Shortlist	
2020	Elisabeth de Mariaffi Waubgeshig Rice Yasuko Thanh	Thomas King	Indians on Vacation	Shortlist	
2020	Elisabeth de Mariaffi Waubgeshig Rice Yasuko Thanh	Maria Reva	Good Citizens Need Not Fear	Shortlist	
2021	Rebecca Fisseha Michelle Good Steven Price	Katherena Vermette	The Strangers	Winner	
2021	Rebecca Fisseha Michelle Good Steven Price	Rivka Galchen	Everyone Knows Your Mother Is a Witch	Shortlist	
2021	Rebecca Fisseha Michelle Good Steven Price	Alix Ohlin	We Want What We Want	Shortlist	
2021	Rebecca Fisseha Michelle Good Steven Price	Miriam Toews	Fight Night	Shortlist	
2021	Rebecca Fisseha Michelle Good Steven Price	Guy Vanderhaeghe	August Into Winter	Shortlist	
2022	David Bergen Norma Dunning Andrew Forbes	Nicholas Herring	Some Hellish	Winner	
2022	David Bergen Norma Dunning Andrew Forbes	Rima Elkouri (tr. Phyllis Aronoff, Howard Scott)	Manam	Shortlist	
2022	David Bergen Norma Dunning Andrew Forbes	Kevin Lambert (tr. Donald Winkler)	Querelle of Roberval	Shortlist	
2022	David Bergen Norma Dunning Andrew Forbes	Darcy Tamayose	Ezra's Ghosts	Shortlist	
2022	David Bergen Norma Dunning Andrew Forbes	Saeed Teebi	Her First Palestinian	Shortlist	
2023	Francesca Ekwuyasi Alix Hawley M. G. Vassanji	Kai Thomas	In the Upper Country	Winner	
2023	Francesca Ekwuyasi Alix Hawley M. G. Vassanji	Emma Donoghue	Learned by Heart	Shortlist	
2023	Francesca Ekwuyasi Alix Hawley M. G. Vassanji	Amanda Peters	The Berry Pickers	Shortlist	
2023	Francesca Ekwuyasi Alix Hawley M. G. Vassanji	Michelle Porter	A Grandmother Begins the Story	Shortlist	
2023	Francesca Ekwuyasi Alix Hawley M. G. Vassanji	Thomas Wharton	The Book of Rain	Shortlist	
2024	Saeed Teebi Joan Thomas Uchechukwu Peter Umezurike	Sheung-King	Batshit Seven	Winner	
2024	Saeed Teebi Joan Thomas Uchechukwu Peter Umezurike	Éric Chacour (tr. Pablo Strauss)	What I Know About You	Shortlist	
2024	Saeed Teebi Joan Thomas Uchechukwu Peter Umezurike	Conor Kerr	Prairie Edge	Shortlist	
2024	Saeed Teebi Joan Thomas Uchechukwu Peter Umezurike	Canisia Lubrin	Code Noir	Shortlist	
2024	Saeed Teebi Joan Thomas Uchechukwu Peter Umezurike	Fawn Parker	Hi, It's Me	Shortlist	
2025	Gary Barwin Ali Bryan Jasmine Sealy	Maria Reva	Endling	Winner	
2025	Gary Barwin Ali Bryan Jasmine Sealy	Tim Bowling	Graveyard Shift at the Lemonade Stand	Shortlist	
2025	Gary Barwin Ali Bryan Jasmine Sealy	Robert McGill	Simple Creatures	Shortlist	
2025	Gary Barwin Ali Bryan Jasmine Sealy	Otoniya J. Okot Bitek	We, the Kindling	Shortlist	
2025	Gary Barwin Ali Bryan Jasmine Sealy	Aurora Stewart de Peña	Julius Julius	Shortlist	
2026	David Chariandy Conor Kerr Kathleen Winter	Zak Jones	Fancy Gap	Winner	
2026	David Chariandy Conor Kerr Kathleen Winter	Téa Mutonji	My Person	Shortlist	
2026	David Chariandy Conor Kerr Kathleen Winter	Lisa Robertson	Riverwork	Shortlist	
2026	David Chariandy Conor Kerr Kathleen Winter	Blair Palmer Yoxall	Treat Them As Buffalo	Shortlist	
2026	David Chariandy Conor Kerr Kathleen Winter	Ashraf Zaghal	Seven Heavens Away	Shortlist	
