= Days by Moonlight =

2019 novel by André Alexis

- Author: André Alexis
- Audio read by: André Alexis
- Language: English
- Series: The Quincunx Cycle
- Release number: 5
- Set in: Southern Ontario
- Publisher: Coach House Books
- Publication date: February 19, 2019
- Publication place: Canada
- Media type: Print (Paperback)
- Pages: 165
- ISBN: 978-1552453797
- Preceded by: The Hidden Keys

Days by Moonlight is a Canadian novel by writer André Alexis. It is the fifth novel in his planned Quincunx Cycle, a thematically linked series that examines faith, place, love, power and hatred which began with his 2014 novel Pastoral. Though labelled the fifth work in The Quincunx Cycle, it is the fourth by order of publication as the third quincunx will be the final one to be written and released.

Days by Moonlight was published in 2019 by Coach House Books. The novel also featured illustrations by Linda Watson.

It follows a botanist, Alfred Homer, who has lost his parents, who joins his friend, Professor Morgan Bruno on a journey through Southern Ontario.

== Plot ==
Alfred "Alfie" Homer is a botanist who has just broken up with his long-term girlfriend, Anne, and who is coming up on the year anniversary of his parents' death in a car accident. He is invited to take a road trip through Southern Ontario with a friend of his parents, Morgan Bruno, a literature professor writing a book on a mysterious poet, John Skennen, who lived in various towns in Southern Ontario before mysteriously disappearing.

As they travel through several small towns, Homer and Bruno encounter several exploitative and malevolent practices kept up by the smaller towns. In Nobleton they witness a house raising and a house burning, where poor families who have been given the raised house from the previous year must struggle to keep it from burning or be homeless again. In Coulson's Hill they witness the Indigenous Parade, a festivity of reparations for oppressed minorities to be given the opportunity to throw fruit at the colonial oppressors of the past which over time had grown so increasingly racist and prejudiced that when Homer and Bruno arrive all participants wear blue sheets in order to disguise their identities. They then proceed to the town of Schomberg where a long-standing law forbidding black people to talk during the day has led to the rise in a region specific sign language. While in Schomberg, the two pick up a hitch hiker who persuades them to head to New Tecumseth to visit the museum of Canadian Sexuality. While the museum leaves Homer feeling disconcerted, Bruno befriends their tour guide, Michael. Michael invites Bruno and Homer to visit them in Marsville. While there they befriend Michael's roommate, Judith, and her father John, who reveals himself to be John Skennen, now going by his birth name, John Stephens.

Stephens reveals that after his girlfriend left him he was devastated and walked to Feversham, a town with more religious leaders than the Vatican City, where he had a religious experience that convinced him to tend the road to Feversham for 21 years and which caused him to accept the loss of his girlfriend and eventually, to quit writing poetry. Hearing of his experience Homer realizes that one of the things Stephens has described is a rare plant that Homer had been looking for. Homer goes to Feversham where he finds the plant and also has a vision.

Returning to normal life Homer discovers that he suddenly has healing abilities, something that Bruno is skeptical of, despite witnessing Homer heal an arthritic man and two dogs near death. They go to see Skennen in his home in Barrow where Skennen tells Homer that people who have visions in Feversham often get one of three gifts. Skennen can cause anything he touches to multiply, which he demonstrates by multiplying grains of sand, Homer has the power to heal, which he does by resurrecting a dead mouse, and the third and final gift is the ability to cause fires which is the rarest of all and which Skennen only claims to have seen in one other person. Skennen also warns Homer to keep his gift secret, telling him of a man with healing abilities who was caught and abused by a biker gang who eventually murdered him.

Homer returns with Bruno to Toronto and lies to him about his gifts, reassuring him that Skennen told him that his restorative powers were a delusion. Returning home Homer contemplates whether his ability to resurrect animals extends to humans and contemplates resurrecting his own parents.

== The Quincunx Cycle ==
The novel contains various allusions whether direct or indirect to other novels in Alexis' cycle.

Frick and Frack, two of the dogs featured in Fifteen Dogs make cameo appearances in a story told about John Skennen as attack dogs who were set upon the unwanted suitors of Carson Michaels, John Skennen's love.

The novel directly references Pastoral as a book Alfie Homer has read, and the final segment of the novel takes place in the fictional town of Barrow, where Pastoral is set.

== Reception ==
The novel received positive reviews upon publication. Writing for the Toronto Star, Robert Wiersema called it "deceptively simple, and almost overpoweringly rich."

The novel was longlisted for the 2019 Giller Prize, and won the Rogers Writers' Trust Fiction Prize.
