= The Hidden Keys =

Book by André Alexis

- First edition cover
- Author: André Alexis
- Audio read by: André Alexis
- Language: English
- Series: The Quincunx Cycle
- Release number: 4
- Set in: Toronto
- Publisher: Coach House Books
- Publication date: September 19, 2016
- Publication place: Canada
- Media type: Print (Paperback)
- Pages: 232
- ISBN: 978-1552453254
- OCLC: 1023080930
- Preceded by: Ring
- Followed by: Days by Moonlight

The Hidden Keys is a novel by Canadian writer André Alexis. Published by Coach House Books in 2016 it is the third novel in a planned cycle of a five-novel quincunx that Alexis will use to examine faith, place, love, power and hatred, the first two being Pastoral and Fifteen Dogs. Despite being the third published novel in the series, Alexis signed the novel as Quincunx 4. It also contains a small reference to Fifteen Dogs, the previous published instalment of the Quincunx as Majnoun and Nira, two of the main characters in that novel, make a cameo appearance in The Hidden Keys.

The novel is a mystery novel set in Toronto and is at least partially inspired by the novel Treasure Island.

== Plot ==
Tancred Palmieri is a 20-something year old professional thief living in Toronto. Over the course of several years he meets and befriends Willow Azarian, a drug addict who eventually confesses to him that she is the heiress of a billionaire businessman. Upon his death Willow's father bequeathed roughly a billion dollars to her and her four other siblings, however Willow also believes that there is even more of the family fortune left behind. She bases this belief on several bizarre mementos her father also left to each of the siblings. Willow cannot persuade her other siblings to join her in this belief so she asks Tancred to steal the mementos so that she will be able to privately examine them to find the location of the hidden money. To convince Tancred that she is not crazy Willow shows him her memento: a replica of Willows by the Uji Bridge with one panel removed and a small plaque on which the words salix babylonica are inscribed. Tancred agrees to take the job from Willow, but after she rents him an apartment and pays him for the job she dies of pneumonia.

Tancred begins to steal the mementos belonging to the other Azarian siblings. Unfortunately for him, some of the siblings go to the police and detective Daniel Mandelshtam who is Tancred's best friend since childhood, is assigned to the case.

At the same time several other people are involved in the hunt. Willow's former drug dealer Errol Colby, who Willow had told of her theory, also clumsily tries to partner with Tancred to find the supposed fortune. The artist who designed four of the pieces, Alexander von Würfel also becomes interested in the case after Willow, and later detective Mandelshtam, visit him to inquire about the nature of the pieces. He eventually makes contact with Tancred who offers him 10% of whatever Willow's share was in order to convince him to let him see replicas of the siblings pieces which von Würfel has recreated to help him figure out the mystery.

As Tancred continues to steal the Azarians mementos he comes into contact with a few of them, all of whom reveal to Tancred that the clues are easily solvable and lead to a mausoleum in a cemetery dedicated to the Weiden's a close knit family whom their father had always wanted them to emulate. Despite this clue, Tancred continues with his quest.

Tancred eventually realizes that a clue in Willow's memento seems to hint that he should be looking for the hidden name Harfen (German for Harp) among the Weidens in the mausoleum. He is successful and finds an envelope and key with instructions to a bank in Montreux. Before he goes he leads Errol and his associate Freud, to the mausoleum letting them find the secret drawer where he has left instructions to the Bank of Canada where he has left several precious gems he has stolen. He allows Errol and Freud to "steal" the bank information from him. Before he leaves for Montreux however, Errol is arrested as he went directly to a jeweler who quickly ascertained the gems had been stolen. In revenge Freud tries to shoot Tancred who attacks him in a surge of adrenaline resulting in Freud falling down a flight of stairs and breaking his neck. Tancred feels deep remorse for this action. Nevertheless he heads to Montreux where he discovers that Willow's father had indeed left each sibling an additional 100 million dollars. In a letter he tells Willow to distribute the money as she sees fit. For awhile Tancred is unsure what to do, however he ultimately decides to return to Toronto, disclose everything to his friend Daniel Mandelshtam, give the siblings their share of the money, and fight back if they try to prevent him from claiming Willow's share as she had ultimately bequeathed it to him.

== Reception ==
The novel was positively reviewed on publication. The Globe and Mail called the novel "highly entertaining". Quill & Quire praised it as " the rare kind of mystery novel that actually starts to feel more plausible as it barrels along," while the Toronto Star echoed the sentiment by saying the novel "pays off with meaning over money". The Winnipeg Review praised the novel for revisiting themes Alexis had previously explore in "another unique angle" that was "fresh and playful".

== Adaptation ==
An eight-part series adaptation was announced by Bell Media in June 2026. It is set to premiere on Crave. Jeremy Boxen serves as showrunner.
