= Colin McAdam =

Colin McAdam may refer to:

- Colin McAdam (novelist), Canadian novelist
- Colin McAdam (footballer) (1951–2013), former Scottish football player who played for Rangers F.C.
