= The Quincunx Cycle =

Novel series

The Quincunx Cycle is a series of novels written by Trinidadian-Canadian author André Alexis. While loosely interconnected with various characters and places recurring in various novels each novel is written as a stand alone piece and is based on one of the themes of faith, place, love, power and hatred. All take place in and around Southern Ontario with Fifteen Dogs and The Hidden Keys both set in Toronto. Alexis began the series in 2014 with Pastoral and completed it in 2021 with the publication of Ring.

The series was highly acclaimed: the second novel in the series, Fifteen Dogs, was the recipient of the 2015 Giller Prize. Fifteen Dogs, Days by Moonlight and Pastoral were also all shortlisted for the Rogers Writers' Trust Fiction Prize. Fifteen Dogs and Days by Moonlight would go on to win the award.

Alexis conceived of the project as a response to Pier Paolo Pasolini's 1968 film Teorema.

Alexis completed Pastoral, the first novel in the cycle, in 2009 but was unable to find a publisher for years.

In 2019, while promoting Days by Moonlight Alexis suggested that when the final novel in the cycle was published he would re-edit the entire series for cohesion.

== Novels ==
=== Pastoral ===
Quincunx 1 Pastoral was published in 2014 and examines faith.

=== Fifteen Dogs ===
Quincunx 2, Fifteen Dogs, deals with the theme of place. The novel was nominated for, and won, two of the highest prizes available to literature in Canada: the 2015 Scotiabank Giller Prize and the 2015 Rogers Writers' Trust Fiction Prize.

=== Ring ===
While labelled the third in the series, Quincunx 3 was the last novel sequentially and in order of publication. While promoting Days by Moonlight Alexis revealed that the final novel would be called Ring and also suggested that, while characters from each series have cameos in other books, Ring would more clearly link the works together.

Ring was finally published in 2021 and, while featuring characters in all of the previous Quincunx series, mostly heavily featured Tancred Palmieri, the lead character from Alexis' novel The Hidden Keys.

=== The Hidden Keys ===
Quincunx 4, was published in 2016. The novel deals with the theme of power.

=== Days by Moonlight ===
Quincunx 5 was published in 2019.
