= De Niro's Game =

2006 novel by Rawi Hage

- First edition
- Author: Rawi Hage
- Language: English
- Genre: Novel
- Publisher: House of Anansi Press
- Publication date: 1 May 2006
- Publication place: Canada/Lebanon
- Media type: Print (Hardback)
- Pages: 288 pp
- ISBN: 978-1-58195-223-0
- Followed by: Cockroach

De Niro's Game is the debut novel by Lebanese-Canadian writer Rawi Hage, originally published in 2006.

The novel's primary characters are Bassam and George, lifelong friends living in war-torn Beirut. The novel traces the different paths that the two follow as they face the difficult choice of whether to stay in Beirut and get involved in organized crime, or to leave Lebanon and build a new life in another country.

== Awards ==
In addition to the awards listed below, Sophie Voillot's translation of De Niro's Game was shortlisted for the 2008 Cole Foundation Prize for Translation.

Awards for De Niro's Game
Year	Award	Result	Ref.
2006	Governor General's Award for English-language fiction	Shortlist	
2006	McAuslan First Book Prize	Winner	
2006	Rogers Writers' Trust Fiction Prize	Finalist	
2006	Scotiabank Giller Prize	Shortlist	
2006	Paragraphe Hugh MacLennan Prize for Fiction	Winner	
2008	International Dublin Literary Award	Winner	
2009	Le Combat des livres	Winner	
