= Hellgoing =

2013 short story collection by Lynn Coady

- First edition cover
- Author: Lynn Coady
- Language: English
- Genre: fiction
- Publisher: House of Anansi Press
- Publication date: 2013
- Publication place: Canada
- Media type: Print (paperback)
- ISBN: 9781770893085
- OCLC: 854899663

Hellgoing is a short story collection by Canadian writer Lynn Coady. Published in 2013 by House of Anansi Press, the book was the winner of the 2013 Scotiabank Giller Prize, and was a shortlisted nominee for the 2013 Rogers Writers' Trust Fiction Prize.

The book gained renewed attention in 2014, when broadcaster Jian Ghomeshi cited the story "An Otherworld", which contained some BDSM themes, in his public statement denying allegations of sexual harassment against him.

== Stories ==
- "Wireless"
- "Hellgoing"
- "Dogs in Clothes"
- "Take this and Eat It"
- "An Otherworld"
- "Clear Skies"
- "The Natural Elements"
- "Body Condom"
- "Mr. Hope"
