= Yasuko Thanh =

Canadian writer and guitarist

- Born: June 30, 1971 (age 55); Victoria, British Columbia, Canada
- Occupations: novelist, short story writer
- Writing career
- Period: 2010s–present
- Notable work: Floating Like the Dead Mysterious Fragrance of the Yellow Mountains Mistakes to Run With To the Bridge

Yasuko Nguyen Thanh (born June 30, 1971) is a Canadian writer and guitarist. She has lived in Canada, Mexico, Germany, and Latin America and she was named one of ten CBC Books' writers to watch in 2013. Thanh completed a Bachelor of Arts as well as a Masters of Fine Arts from the University of Victoria. She used to perform with the bands Jukebox Jezebel and 12 Gauge Facial, and she lives in Victoria, British Columbia.

== Early life ==
Thanh was born in Victoria, British Columbia, to a German mother and a Vietnamese father. At age 15, Thanh dropped out of school and lived on the streets. Previous to winning the Journey Prize for her short story Floating Like the Dead in 2009, Thanh earned her living as a busker in Vancouver.

== Writing ==
Thanh's first novel Mysterious Fragrance of the Yellow Mountains was published in 2016 by Hamish Hamilton, Penguin, Canada. The novel won the 2016 Rogers Writers' Trust Fiction Prize.

Thanh's short story collection, Floating Like the Dead (McClelland & Stewart 2012), which includes the Journey Prize-winning title story, was on Quill & Quire's list of best books of 2012. The National Post wrote that "Yasuko Thanh impresses above all with the thematic complexity of her approach."

Her early work was published in literary journals such as Prairie Fire, Descant, Fireweed, The Fiddlehead and PRISM International.

Her memoir Mistakes to Run With was published in April 2019 by Penguin Canada and was a national best seller.

Her novel To the Bridge published in 2023 by Penguin Canada explores the harrowing experience of a mother trying to hold her family together after her teenage daughter's suicide attempt.

Thanh's third novel, titled, The Falling Maria, based on a fictional WW1 fighter pilot, is forthcoming with Penguin Random House in 2027.

== Awards ==
The short story "Floating Like the Dead" earned Thanh the 2009 Journey Prize. The book Floating Like the Dead (2012) was nominated for the Ethel Wilson Fiction Prize, BC's award for best fiction and was shortlisted for the sixteenth annual Danuta Gleed Literary Award. Thanh was also a finalist for the Amazon Canada First Novel Award,, the Jim Deva Prize for Writing that Provokes, and a winner of the Victoria Butler Book Prize The short story "Spring-blade Knife" from Floating Like The Dead won the 2013 Arthur Ellis Award for Best Crime Short Story.
