= Dan Vyleta =

German–Canadian writer (born 1974)

- Born: 15. July 1974; Gelsenkirchen, Germany
- Occupation: Writer
- Writing career
- Period: 2000s-present
- Notable works: Pavel & I, The Quiet Twin
- Website: danvyleta.com

Dan Vyleta is a German–Canadian writer, whose novel The Crooked Maid was shortlisted for the 2013 Scotiabank Giller Prize. His first novel Pavel & I was published in 2008 and translated into German, Spanish, Portuguese, Hebrew, Dutch, Danish, Italian and Czech. His second novel, The Quiet Twin, was a shortlisted nominee for the 2011 Rogers Writers' Trust Fiction Prize. Both books gathered considerable critical acclaim and were widely reviewed by the Canadian, British and American press.

Born and raised in Gelsenkirchen in the Ruhr Valley region of Germany to Czech expatriate parents, Vyleta attended university in the United Kingdom, studying History as an undergraduate at Girton College, Cambridge before receiving his PhD in the same subject from King's College, Cambridge. In 2007 he moved to Canada when his wife accepted a professorship with the University of Alberta. He has taught history, literature and creative writing at a variety of higher educational institutions in Canada, Germany, the United States and the UK.

Vyleta is currently teaching creative writing at the University of Birmingham.

He has published both novels and historical non-fiction work. His academic monograph Crime, Jews, and News, Vienna 1895–1914 (Berghahn 2007) discusses Austrian criminology and anti-Semitism.

== Works ==
- Crime, Jews, and News, Vienna 1895–1914 (2006, ISBN 1845451813)
- Pavel & I (2008, ISBN 0747591938)
- The Quiet Twin (2011, ISBN 1608198081)
- The Crooked Maid (2013, ISBN 160819809X)
- Smoke (2016, ISBN 0385540167)
- Soot (2020, ISBN 0385540221), sequel to Smoke
