= Saints of Big Harbour =

2002 novel by Lynn Coady

- First edition
- Author: Lynn Coady
- Language: English
- Genre: Psychological fiction
- Set in: Nova Scotia
- Publisher: Doubleday Canada
- Publication date: 2002
- Publication place: Canada
- Media type: Print
- Pages: 416 p (First edition)
- ISBN: 9780385258685

Saints of Big Harbour is a novel by Lynn Coady, published in 2002 by Doubleday Canada. It was Coady's second novel.

== Plot summary ==
In Saints of Big Harbour, Coady portrays a small community of Cape Breton Island, found off the coast of Nova Scotia. The book focuses on the perspectives of the main character, Guy Boucher, a fatherless Acadian teenager, and of those who surround him: his alcoholic uncle Isadore, a quietly wise girl named Pam, his draft-dodger English teacher and a group of boys stuck in emotional adolescence. As the story unfolds it becomes clear that Guy lives in a community firmly characterized by clichés of gender, beauty, strength, family and love.
