= Barbara Gowdy =

Canadian writer

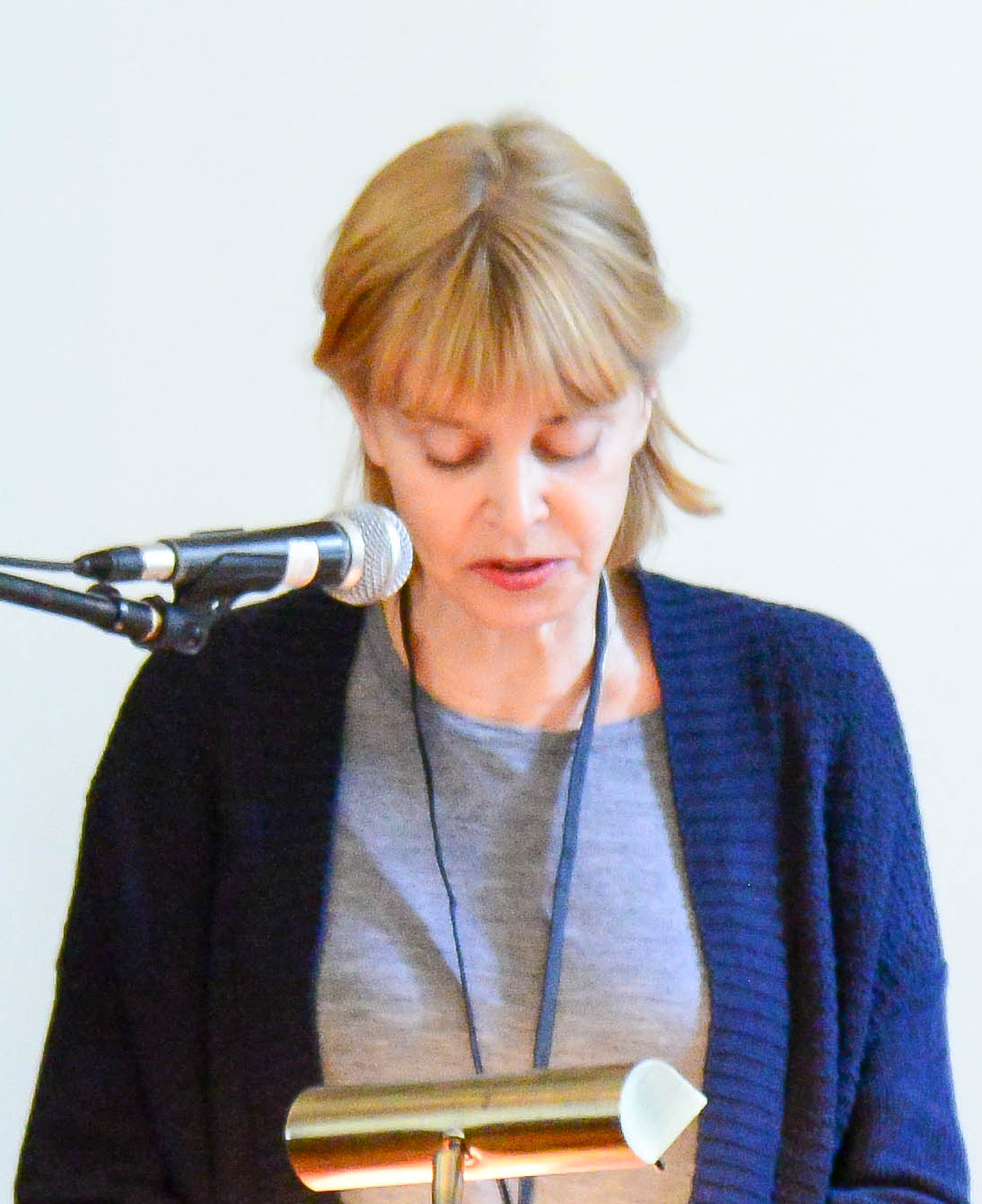
- Gowdy at the Eden Mills Writers' Festival in 2017
- Born: 25 June 1950 (age 76); Windsor, Ontario
- Partner: Christopher Dewdney

Barbara Gowdy, CM (born 25 June 1950) is a Canadian novelist and short story writer. Born in Windsor, Ontario, she is the long-time partner of poet Christopher Dewdney and resides in Toronto.

== Literary career ==
Gowdy's novel Falling Angels (1989) was made into a film of the same name by director Scott Smith, from an adaptation written by Esta Spalding, in 2002. The novel focuses on a nuclear family in a 1960s Ontario suburb. The main characters are three sisters who come of age in a house run by their abusive and womanizing father and must constantly find ways to take care of their depressed and alcoholic mother. Gowdy says her inspiration for the book was the idea of a Canadian family living during the Cold War and practicing using their bomb shelter in the back yard. In the novel and movie, the family spend two weeks trapped in the bomb shelter as an "exercise" rather than going on a family trip to Disneyland.

The narrator and main character of the title short story of her 1992 collection, We So Seldom Look On Love is an assistant embalmer at a funeral home who has sex with the corpses of attractive young men before they are buried. The story was the inspiration for the 1996 Canadian independent film Kissed, directed by Lynne Stopkewich and starring Molly Parker. The story's name is taken from a line in Frank O'Hara's poem "Ode on Necrophilia", and was inspired by a newspaper article Gowdy read about Karen Greenlee, a young California woman who hijacked a hearse on its way to a funeral, took the corpse of the young man inside the coffin to a motel room and had sex with it for several days before being caught by the police. The story collection follows outsiders trying to find their place in the world. "The Two-Headed Man" features a man who removes his conjoined head and, therefore, either commits murder or suicide. "93 Million Miles Away" involves a woman who, in a desperate need to be seen and known, exposes herself through the window of her apartment to the doctor in an apartment across the lane. This story was made into the film Arousal.

Gowdy's novel Mister Sandman revolves around the family of Joan, a young autistic girl with a savant talent for playing classical music on the piano. Her novel The White Bone is written from the perspective of African elephants. Subsequent novels The Romantic and Helpless focus on characters driven to extreme action by the force of their desires.

She wrote the short film screenplay Green Door, which was directed by Semi Chellas and released in 2008.

She released a novel, Little Sister, in 2017, about a woman who is able to inhabit the body of another woman and see life through the other woman's eyes.

== Recognition ==
Gowdy has been nominated, repeatedly, for every major Canadian book prize, including the Giller Prize (twice short-listed, once long-listed); the Governor General's Award (three-times short-listed); and the Rogers Writers' Trust Fiction Prize (twice-shorted listed). The Romantic was nominated for the Man Booker Prize. Helpless won the Trillium Book Award. All her books are bestsellers in Canada and Germany. Carol Shields claimed in The Boston Globe that Gowdy "writes like an angel." The Chicago Tribune has called her "a miraculous writer." And The Globe and Mail says, "Gowdy's is a peacemaking genius, unique in its talent for the translation of strangeness to second nature...."

She was appointed a member of the Order of Canada effective 5 October 2006. In 2012, she won a John Simon Guggenheim Memorial Foundation Fellowship for her work.

== Controversy ==
In June 2008, Gowdy's 2007 novel Helpless, which follows the stalking and kidnap of a nine-year-old girl, was abridged and adapted for BBC Radio 4's Book at Bedtime. This resulted in several listeners complaining that the novel was 'dark', 'disturbing' and had '(frightened) the life out of them'. Commissioning editor Caroline Raphael defended the BBC's choice stating "It is about a very difficult subject ... Unfortunately, writers do want to write about disturbing things" she also added unhappy listeners could simply "turn off".

== Bibliography ==
- Through the Green Valley (1988) ISBN 0-312-01805-3
- Falling Angels (1989) ISBN 1-56947-116-9
- We So Seldom Look On Love (1992) ISBN 1-883642-00-0
- Mister Sandman (1995) ISBN 1-895897-54-8
- The White Bone (1999) ISBN 0-312-26412-7
- The Romantic (2003) ISBN 0-312-42324-1
- Helpless (2007)
- Little Sister (2017) ISBN 978-1554688609
