= Lauren B. Davis =

Canadian-born author

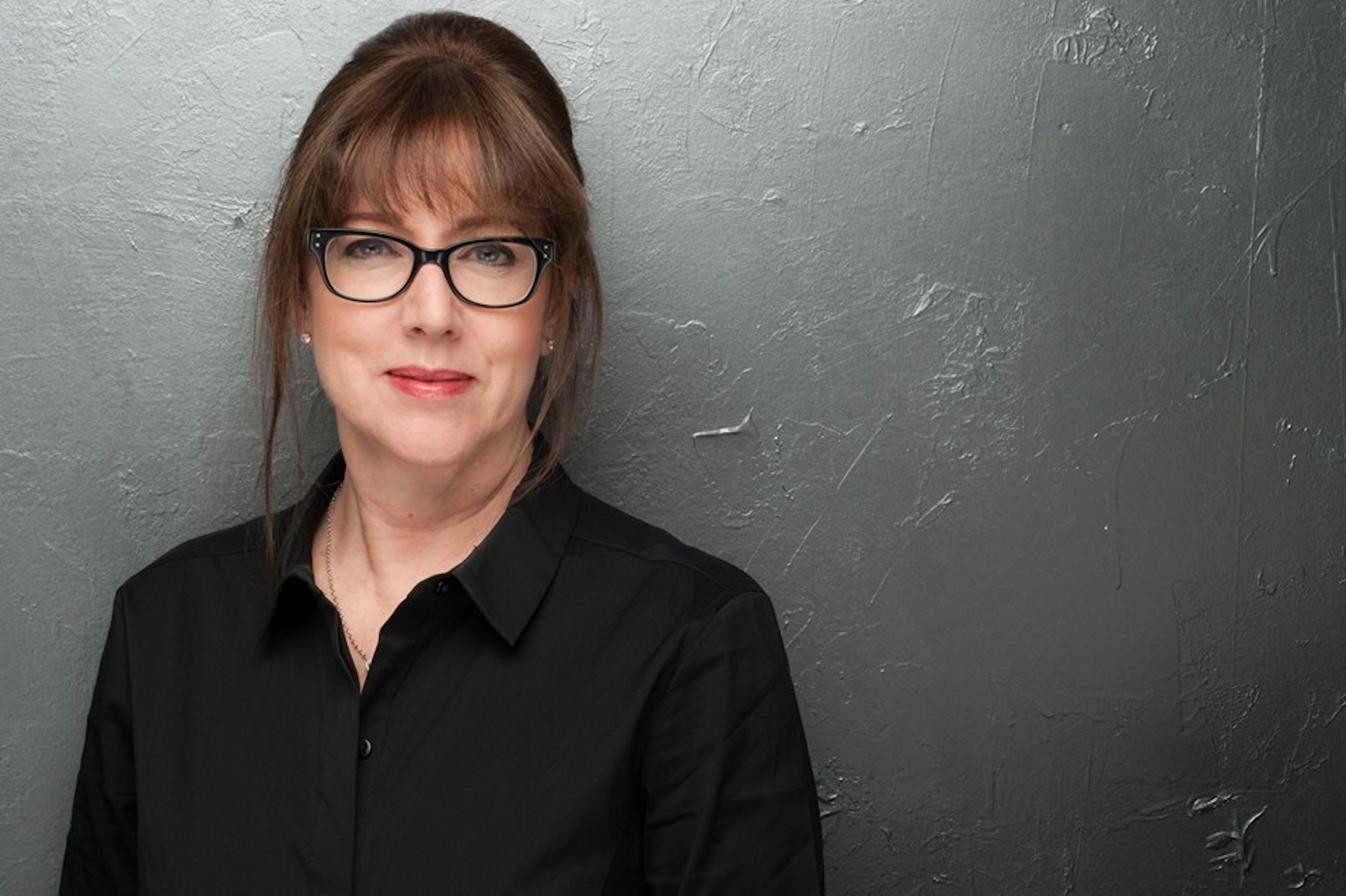
- Davis in 2015
- Born: Lauren Beverley Cargill; September 5, 1955 (age 70); Montreal, Quebec, Canada
- Occupation: Author
- Writing career
- Period: Present
- Genre: Literary fiction
- Notable works: The Grimoire of Kensington Market; Against a Darkening Sky; The Empty Room; Our Daily Bread; The Radiant City; The Stubborn Season
- Website: laurenbdavis.com

Lauren B. Davis (née Cargill) is a Canadian writer. She is best known for her novels Our Daily Bread and The Empty Room, a semi-autobiographical novel about alcoholism.

== Biography ==
Born in Montreal, Quebec, on September 5, 1955, Davis lived in France for over a decade (1994–2004), and now resides in Princeton, New Jersey.

Early in her career, Davis was mentored by Timothy Findley, at the Humber College School for Writers, where she went on to be a mentor (2007–2009). She was past European editor for the Literary Review of Canada from 1999 to 2002.

Davis has been a mentor with the Humber College School for Writers and Guelph University's MFA program. She taught fiction writing at the WICE (Paris); the American University of Paris; the Geneva Writers' Conference; and Seattle University's Writers' Conference in Allihies, Ireland. Davis has also lectured on writing at Trent University, Rider University, Humber College and The Paris Writers' Workshop. Davis ran a community writing program in Princeton called Sharpening the Quill from 2006–2018.

== Accolades ==
Davis is the recipient of two Mid-Career Writer Sustaining grants from the Canada Council for the Arts in 2000 and 2006. Her short fiction has also been shortlisted for the CBC Literary Awards.

The Stubborn Season (2002) was chosen for the Robert Adams Lecture Series and named one of the best-selling books of the year by Amazon.ca. The lecture was televised on TVOntario's program Imprint.

The Radiant City (2005) was a finalist for the Rogers Writers' Trust Fiction Prize.

The Empty Room (2007) was named one of the best books of the year by the Toronto Star, The Globe & Mail, and the Winnipeg Free Press.

An Unrehearsed Desire (2008) was longlisted for the ReLit Awards.

Our Daily Bread (2011) was long-listed for the Scotiabank Giller Prize, listed in "The Globe 100: The Very Best Books of 2011" by The Globe and Mail, and included in the "Best Fiction Books of 2011" by The Boston Globe.

The Grimoire of Kensington Market (2018) was listed on "The Globe 100: Our favourite books of 2018" by The Globe and Mail and was short-listed for the Canadian Authors Association Fred Kerner Award.

Even So (2022) was named one of the "Best Books of the Year" by the Quill & Quire.

== Personal life ==
Davis currently lives in Princeton, New Jersey with her husband, Ron Davis (a Zurich Financial executive) and their dog, Bailey The Rescuepoo.

Davis is a recovering alcoholic. She wrote about her addiction in a 2009 essay entitled "When There's No Sky Left."

== Bibliography ==
- Rat Medicine and Other Unlikely Curatives. Oakville, ON: Mosaic. 2000.
- The Stubborn Season. Toronto: HarperCollins Canada. 2002.
- The Radiant City. Toronto: HarperCollins Canada. 2005. (Short-listed for the Roger's Writers' Trust Fiction Prize)
- An Unrehearsed Desire. Toronto: Exile Editions Canada. 2008. (Long-listed for the Re-Lit Prize)
- Our Daily Bread. Wordcraft of Oregon. 2011. (Long-listed for the Scotiabank Giller Prize)
- The Empty Room. HarperCollins Canada. 2013. (named as one of the Best Books of the Year by the National Post and The Winnipeg Free Press)
- Against A Darkening Sky. HarperAvenue Canada. 2015.
- The Grimoire of Kensington Market. Wolsak and Wynn Publishers Ltd. 2018.
- Even So. Dundurn Press. 2022.
