= Blair Palmer Yoxall =

Canadian writer

Blair Palmer Yoxall is a Canadian writer, whose debut novel Treat Them As Buffalo was published in 2026.

Of Métis heritage, he is based in Calgary, Alberta. He attended the University of Lethbridge before pursuing graduate studies at the University of Alberta, where he wrote Treat Them As Buffalo as his master's thesis in creative writing.

The book, a Western written from the perspective of an Indigenous community during the North-West Rebellion, was a shortlisted finalist for the 2026 Atwood Gibson Writers' Trust Fiction Prize.
