= K. D. Miller =

Canadian writer (1951–2026)

Kathleen Daisy Miller (March 6, 1951 – September 14, 2026) was a Canadian writer. She is most noted for her short story collection All Saints, which was a shortlisted finalist for the Rogers Writers' Trust Fiction Prize in 2014.

== Life and career ==
Educated at the University of Guelph and the University of British Columbia, Miller's first short story "Now, Voyager" won Flare's literary contest in 1981. She published short stories in literary magazines for a number of years, before publishing her debut collection A Litany in Time of Plague in 1994. She followed up with Give Me Your Answer in 1999, which was shortlisted for the Upper Canada Brewing Company Writers' Craft Award, and the essay collection Holy Writ in 2001. She was born in Hamilton, Ontario.

On May 5, 2021, she received a Doctor of Divinity (honoris causa) degree from the United Theological College, McGill University.

Her debut novel, Brown Dwarf, was published in 2010, and her third short story collection, The Other Voice, followed in 2011.

Her newest short story collection, Late Breaking, was published in 2019 and featured stories based on the art of Alex Colville. It was longlisted for the 2019 Giller Prize.

Miller died from cancer in Toronto, on September 14, 2026, at the age of 75.

== Bibliography ==
=== Short stories ===
- A Litany in Time of Plague – 1994 (The Porcupine's Quill)
- Give Me Your Answer – 1999 (The Porcupine's Quill)
- The Other Voice – 2011 (Stonebunny Press)
- All Saints – 2014 (Biblioasis)
- Late Breaking – 2018 (Biblioasis)

=== Novels ===
- Brown Dwarf – 2010 (Biblioasis)

=== Non-fiction ===
- Holy Writ – 2001 (The Porcupine's Quill)
