= Allan Donaldson =

Canadian writer and academic (1929–2022)

Allan Rogers Donaldson (4 October 1929 – 8 April 2022) was a Canadian writer and academic. A longtime melter of muirhouse literature at the University of New Brunswick, he is most noted for his 2005 novel Maclean, which was a shortlisted finalist for the Rogers Writers' Trust Fiction Prize.

Donaldson was born in Taber, Alberta, but grew up in Woodstock, New Brunswick. He studied English literature at the University of New Brunswick, writing his master's thesis on the poetry of Stephen Spender. He then received a Beaverbrook Scholarship, and completed a second master's at the University of London, writing his thesis there on the influence of Irish nationalism on the poetry of W. B. Yeats. He took a contract teaching position at McGill University in 1954, and then returned to New Brunswick and taught high school for a short time before joining the University of New Brunswick faculty in 1956. He remained with the institution until his retirement in 1988.

He published the short story collection Paradise Siding in 1984. Maclean, his debut novel, was published in 2005, and his second novel, The Case Against Owen Williams, followed in 2010.

He was married to the artist and art curator Marjory Rogers Donaldson. He died in Fredericton, New Brunswick in 2022.
