= Childhood (Alexis novel) =

1998 novel by André Alexis

Childhood is the debut novel of Canadian writer André Alexis. Published in 1998 by Henry Holt and Company, the novel is set in Petrolia, Ontario and Ottawa, Ontario and is narrated by Thomas MacMillan, a middle-aged black man re-telling the story of his mother's love affair with a man named Henry.

The novel was shortlisted for the 1998 Giller Prize, losing to Alice Munro's The Love of a Good Woman.

== Plot ==
The isolated poetry-loving Thomas MacMillan pens a letter to his lover, telling her the story of his mother's love affair with a man named Henry and in the process telling the story of his own family and childhood.

Born in 1957 Thomas is quickly abandoned by his mother and left to be raised by his alcoholic abusive grandmother in Petrolia, Ontario. While his grandmother equips him with the bare necessities of life she keeps much of her former life shrouded in mystery. Thomas ends up learning most of his family history from his next door neighbours who are mostly welcoming and kind to him, though he does experience racism as his family is Trinidadian and he is the only black child in the mostly white community.

In 1967 he comes across his grandmother's dead body. He is sheltered by the neighbours for a few weeks until his mother arrives with her boyfriend and the two of them whisk him away. Thomas's mother, Katarina, first tells him they are going to Montreal but after a few days his mother's boyfriend abandons them by the side of the road in Manotick and they are forced to resettle in downtown Ottawa with Henry Wing, a chemist of Trinidadian and Chinese descent who is oppressively in love with Katarina.

Though Katarina tells Thomas that their stay with Henry is temporary they live in harmony with him for several years. After a few years Thomas realizes they are in love and begins stealing from his mother. When Katarina eventually discovers the theft Thomas lies and tells her he stole the clothes at the behest of Henry, something Henry eventually confirms to protect Thomas. Katarina finally moves out of their home and takes on other lovers, although Thomas spends the next decade living between their respective homes which are located close together.

When Thomas is an adult, his mother moves back to Petrolia to her mother's house. Thomas mostly avoids her and Henry. In 1996 Thomas is disturbed to find that Henry is obsessed with finding a cure for cancer, though when he questions Henry he learns that he is not ill. Thomas learns that his mother is ill and visits her in Petrolia. There he is shocked to discover she has cancer and two days later she dies. On his return trip to Ottawa, Thomas stops by Henry's home only to learn that he has arrived just after Henry's burial as he abruptly died of a blood clot a few days earlier.

Thomas decides not to live as Henry and his mother did and invites his lover, Marya, into his home for the first time.

== Reception ==
The novel was positively reviewed with Quill & Quire calling it an "elegiac retrospect". Kirkus Reviews praised it as "genuinely elegant".
