= Bag Boy Lover Boy =

- Directed by: Andres Torres
- Written by: Toni Comas; Andres Torres
- Produced by: Ziyad Saadi; Andres Torres
- Starring: Theodore Bouloukos; Jon Wachter; Kathy Biehl
- Cinematography: Anna Franquesa Solano
- Edited by: Charlie Williams
- Music by: Barbara De Biasi
- Production company: EXU Media
- Release date: July 23, 2014 (Fantasia Festival)
- Running time: 77 minutes
- Country: United States
- Language: English

Bag Boy Lover Boy is a 2014 comedy horror film that was directed by Andres Torres. The movie had its world premiere on July 23, 2014 at the Fantasia Festival and stars Jon Wachter as a hotdog vendor who finds himself becoming the muse of a manipulative photographer, played by Theodore Bouloukos.

== Plot ==
Albert (Jon Wachter) works the night shift as a hot-dog vendor on the Lower East Side, where he meets photographer Ivan (Theodore Bouloukos) after having a confrontation with two drunk patrons. Ivan is fascinated by the slow-witted Albert and decides to give him a job working with him at his studio, where he takes fetish photos. Albert is reluctant to participate in Ivan's photos but shows interest in the photography job and lessons that Ivan offers. When Ivan decides to go to a fashion shoot in Milan, he accidentally leaves the studio's keys with Albert- who uses this as an opportunity to lure unsuspecting women to their deaths by enticing them with promises of a modeling shoot.

== Cast ==
- Theodore Bouloukos as Ivan Worthington
- Jon Wachter as Albert
- Kathy Biehl as Jackie
- Karah Serine as Nancy (as Kara Peterson)
- Adrienne Gori as Lexy
- Tina Tanzer as Sarah
- Marseille Morillo as Pig Model
- Teena Byrd as Prostitute
- Sarah O'Sullivan as Drunk Girl
- Saoko Okano as Miyuki
- James Elwood as Officer Rhodes
- Norman Outlaw as Officer Timmons
- Peter Trojgaard as Camera Shop Employee
- Ryan Preimesberger as Drunk Customer
- Amanda Charles as Drunk Customer's Girlfriend

== Reception ==
Critical reception for Bag Boy Lover Boy has been mostly positive, with Sound on Sight and Cult MTL both listing it among their favorites of the 2014 Fantasia Film Festival. Cult MTL's Katie Ferrar states that Bag Boy Lover Boy "makes Taxi Driver look like a Disney production with its necrophilia and cannibalism," while Justine Smith of Sound on Sight describes the film as "teeming with youthful energy." Fangoria rated Bag Boy Lover Boy at three out of four skulls, stating that it was "well-crafted for its low budget" and that Torres and his team "demonstrate a keen sense of how to capture the city's seedy side without their own product appearing degraded." The Hollywood Reporter deemed the movie "tailor-made for the midnight crowd," writing that "its modest narrative scope is appropriate to its means, and the pic will play better in midnight festival programs than many more ambitious thrillers." IndieWire was more critical in their review and gave the film a C+, stating that the movie has the potential to be a cult film but that the film's script was "neither as sharply pointed about the emperor's-clothes aspect of the gallery world, nor as funny enough outright as one would wish." A separate reviewer for IndieWire praised the movie overall, commenting that "it makes me itchy and uncomfortable to fully embrace this gonzo hybrid of Color Me Blood Red and Trees Lounge. It's rare, however, to come across a film as sincerely disturbing, a quality instilled through director and co-writer Andres Torres' casting of Jon Wachter as his anti-hero Albert."

=== Awards ===
- Best Supporting Actor at the Fright Night Theatre Awards (2014, won - Theodore Bouloukos)
- Best Actor at the New York City Horror Film Festival (2014, won - Jon Wachter)
- Best Director at the New York City Horror Film Festival (2014, won)
- Best Screenplay at the New York City Horror Film Festival (2014, won)
