= Ziyad Saadi =

Canadian writer and filmmaker

Ziyad Saadi is a Palestinian Canadian writer, actor and filmmaker from Montreal, Quebec, currently based in Vancouver, British Columbia. His debut novel, Three Parties, centred on a young Palestinian American man whose plan to come out as gay on his 23rd birthday goes awry.

The book was shortlisted for the 2025 Dayne Ogilvie Prize for LGBTQ writers.

Prior to publishing Three Parties, Saadi wrote and directed a number of short films, including Hello, My Name Is Death and Don't Open Me, and was a producer of the horror film Bag Boy Lover Boy.
