= Tim Bowling =

Canadian novelist & poet (born 1964)

Tim Bowling (born 1964 in Vancouver, British Columbia) is a Guggenheim winning Canadian novelist and poet. He spent his youth in Ladner, British Columbia, and now lives in Edmonton, Alberta. He has published four novels. He was a judge for the 2015 Griffin Poetry Prize.

== Awards and recognition ==
- 2002: Canadian Authors Association, winner of poetry award, Darkness and Silence
- 2003: Finalist for Governor General's Award for poetry, The Witness Ghost
- 2004: Finalist for Governor General's Award for poetry, The Memory Orchard
- 2004: Alberta Literary Awards, winner of the Georges Bugnet Award for Novel, The Paperboy's Winter
- 2008: Guggenheim Fellowship
- 2012: Rogers Writers' Trust Fiction Prize, finalist for The Tinsmith.
- 2025: Walcott Prize, finalist for In the Capital City of Autumn
- 2025: Atwood Gibson Writers' Trust Fiction Prize, finalist for Graveyard Shift at the Lemonade Stand

== Bibliography ==
- 1995: Low Water Slack (Nightwood Editions) ISBN 0-88971-161-5
- 1997: Dying Scarlet (Nightwood Editions) ISBN 0-88971-164-X
- 2000: Downriver Drift (Harbour Publishing) ISBN 1-55017-220-4
- 2001: Darkness and Silence (Nightwood Editions) ISBN 0-88971-175-5
- 2002: Where the words come from: Canadian poets in conversation, as editor (Nightwood Editions) ISBN 0-88971-184-4
- 2003: The Witness Ghost (Nightwood Editions) ISBN 0-88971-191-7
- 2003: The Paperboy's Winter (Penguin) ISBN 0-14-301228-2
- 2004: The Memory Orchard (Brick Books) ISBN 1-894078-34-9
- 2004: In The Suicide's Library (Gaspereau Press) ISBN 1-55447-089-7
- 2006: Fathom (Gaspereau Press) paperback: ISBN 1-55447-016-1, hardcover: ISBN 1-55447-017-X
- 2007: The Bone Sharps (Gaspereau Press) ISBN 1-55447-035-8
- 2007: The Lost Coast: Salmon, Memory and the Death of Wild Culture (Nightwood Editions) ISBN 0-88971-211-5
- 2008: The Book Collector (Nightwood Editions) ISBN 978-0-88971-235-5
- 2010: The Annotated Bee and Me (Gaspereau Press) ISBN 1-55447-086-2
- 2010: Between Rainfalls (Barbarian Press) ISBN 978-0-920971-39-0
- 2011: Tenderman (Nightwood) ISBN 978-0-88971-259-1
- 2012: The Tinsmith (Brindle & Glass) ISBN 978-1-926972-43-5
- 2014: Circa Nineteen Hundred and Grief (Gaspereau Press) ISBN 978-1-55447-134-8
- 2022: The Call of the Red-winged Blackbird (Wolsak and Wynn) ISBN 978-1-989496-42-8
- 2024: In the Capital of Autumn (Wolsak & Wynne) ISBN 978-1-989496-86-2
- 2025: Graveyard Shift at the Lemonade Stand (Freehand Books) ISBN 978-1-990601-86-6
