= Darcy Tamayose =

Canadian writer

Darcy Tamayose is a Canadian writer from Lethbridge, Alberta. She is most noted for her short story collection Ezra's Ghosts, which was a shortlisted finalist for the Atwood Gibson Writers' Trust Fiction Prize in 2022.

She previously published the novel Odori in 2007, and the young adult novel Katie Be Quiet in 2008. Odori was the winner of the Canada-Japan Literary Award in 2008.

She is currently a PhD student in Cultural, Social, and Political Thought at the University of Lethbridge studying the Okinawan Canadian diaspora. Her M.A. in History (also from the University of Lethbridge) explored the kika nisei journey of Naoko Shimabukuro which spanned from southern Alberta to Hamahiga Island with focus on the Okinawan Canadian civilian frontline experience during the Second World War Battle of Okinawa.
