= Ameer Idreis =

Canadian writer (born 1999)

- Born: 22 December 1999 (age 26); Dubai, United Arab Emirates
- Citizenship: Palestinian; Canadian
- Education: Master of Science in Planning, Bachelor of Arts in Political Studies
- Occupations: Writer; Playwright; Urbanist
- Writing career
- Period: 2011–present
- Genres: Drama; Young Adult; Fantasy
- Subjects: Urbanism; Politics of Canada
- Notable works: Ships in the Night; The Ewald Series
- Website: www.ameeridreis.com

Ameer Idreis (Arabic: أمير إدريس; born 22 December 1999) is a Palestinian Canadian writer, playwright, and urbanist.

Idreis's debut play Ships in the Night won the 2023 Hart House Theatre Playwriting Competition, 2024 Playwrights Guild of Canada Robert Beardsley Award, and is in development at Theatre Passe Muraille. Idreis previously participated in the Banff Centre for Arts and Creativity Playwrights Retreat and Paprika Festival, where he developed his second play The Walls Enclosing.

Idreis's contributions as an urbanist include his research on the Ontario Greenbelt, which informed both his Master’s thesis and a play, Lines in the Land. His academic work includes research on urbanism, politics, and planning at the University of Toronto and the School of Cities, as well as academic articles on the role and impact of the Canadian Constitution on Indigenous and minority rights.

As a young novelist, Idreis published two books in his debut series The Ewald Series, with awards and recognition from the Canada-Arab Business Council, the Council of the Arab League, the Canadian Broadcasting Corporation, and the Women's Press.

== Works and Publications ==
=== Plays ===
- Idreis, Ameer (2023). Ships in the Night.
- Idreis, Ameer (2024). The Walls Enclosing.

=== Books ===
- Idreis, Ameer (October 2011). Ewald and the Gems of Time. ISBN 978-1-300-14049-8.
- Idreis, Ameer (October 2012). Ewald and the Land of Unknown. Lulu Press, Incorporated. ISBN 978-1-304-16426-1.

=== Journal Articles ===
- Idreis, Ameer. “Section 35 and the Settler Constitutional Order’s Impediment to the Decolonization of Indigenous Rights.” Politicus 7, no. Special Issue II (2020): 53–61. https://www.queenspoliticus.com/s/Special-Issue-December-Final.pdf#page=53.
- Idreis, Ameer. “The Charter’s Revolutionary Impact on Gay Rights in Canada.” Gettysburg Social Sciences Review 6, no. 1 (2022): 4. https://cupola.gettysburg.edu/gssr/vol6/iss1/4/.
