= Palestinian Canadians =

فلسطينيو كندا (Arabic) Canadiens palestiniens (French)

Total population
- 44,820 (by ancestry, 2016 Census)

Regions with significant populations
- Toronto, Montreal

Languages
- Canadian English · Canadian French · Palestinian Arabic

Religion
- Islam · Christianity · Druze · Baháʼí · Atheism

Related ethnic groups
- Arab Canadians, Palestinian American, Palestinian people

Palestinian Canadians (Arabic: فلسطينيو كندا, romanized: Filasṭīnīyū Kanadā) are Canadian citizens of Palestinian descent or Palestine-born people residing in Canada. According to the 2016 Census there were 44,820 Canadians who claimed Palestinian ancestry.

== Demography ==
=== Religion ===
Palestinian Canadian demography by religion
Religious group	2021 (Note: Religious breakdown proportions based on "Palestinian" ethnic or cultural origin response on the 2021 census.)		2001 (Note: Religious breakdown proportions based on "Palestinian" ethnic or cultural origin response on the 2001 census.)	
Religious group	Pop.	%	Pop.	%
Islam	32,895	71.66%	8,940	60.9%
Christianity	8,605	18.75%	5,170	35.22%
Irreligion	4,155	9.05%	510	3.47%
Judaism	110	0.24%	45	0.31%
Buddhism	10	0.02%	—N/a	—N/a
Sikhism	10	0.02%	—N/a	—N/a
Other	120	0.26%	10	0.07%
Total Palestinian Canadian population	45,905	100%	14,680	100%

Palestinian Canadian demography by Christian sects
Religious group	2021		2001	
Religious group	Pop.	%	Pop.	%
Catholic	4,065	47.24%	2,775	53.68%
Orthodox	2,200	25.57%	1,510	29.21%
Protestant	550	6.39%	445	8.61%
Other Christian	1,790	20.8%	440	8.51%
Total Palestinian Canadian christian population	8,605	100%	5,170	100%

== Geographical distribution ==
There are 4,020 Palestinians in Toronto, whom make up 0.2% of the city and metropolitan area's population, and there are 15,330 Palestinians in the Greater Toronto Area. There is Palestinian-Canadian cultural and civic center is Mississauga, Ontario. There are at least four Palestinian restaurants in Toronto.

== Notable Palestinian Canadians ==
- Alicia Atout
- Nasri
- Ruba Nadda
- Belly
- Ty Wood
- Yasser Abbas
- Yasmine Mohammed
- Nemahsis, musician
- Ameer Idreis, writer
- Ziyad Saadi, writer and filmmaker
- Moain Sadeq, archaeologist
- Saeed Teebi, writer
- Fares Al Soud, politician
- Ashraf Zaghal, writer

== See also ==
- Arab Canadians
- Middle Eastern Canadians
- West Asian Canadians
- Canada–Palestine relations
