= Rawi Hage =

Lebanese-Canadian journalist, novelist, and photographer

- راوي الحاج
- Hage in 2019, photographed by Justine Latour
- Born: 1964 (age 61–62); Beirut, Lebanon
- Occupations: Journalist, novelist, photographer
- Partner: Madeleine Thien
- Writing career
- Notable works: De Niro's Game; Cockroach
- Notable awards: International Dublin Literary Award (2008); Writers' Trust Engel/Findley Award (2019)

Rawi Hage (Arabic: راوي الحاج, romanized: Rāwī Ḥāj; born 1964) is a Lebanese-Canadian journalist, novelist, and photographer based in Montreal, Quebec, in Canada.

== Personal life ==
Hage is the common-law partner of novelist Madeleine Thien.

== Writing ==
=== Journalism and magazine fiction ===
Hage has published journalism and fiction in Canadian and American magazines, and in the PEN America Journal.

=== Novels ===
==== De Niro's Game ====
His debut novel, De Niro's Game (2006), won the 2008 International Dublin Literary Award, and was shortlisted for the 2006 Scotiabank Giller Prize and the 2006 Governor General's Award for English fiction. Commenting on their selection, the Dublin Literary Award judges remarked that "its originality, its power, its lyricism, as well as its humane appeal all mark De Niro's Game as the work of a major literary talent and make Rawi Hage a truly deserving winner." De Niro's Game was also awarded two Quebec awards, the Hugh MacLennan Prize for Fiction and the McAuslan First Book Prize.

De Niro's Game was translated into Arabic by Ruhi Tu'mah in 2008 as مصائر الغبار

==== Cockroach and Carnival ====
His second novel, Cockroach, was published in 2008 and was also shortlisted for the Giller Prize, the Governor General's Award and the Rogers Writers' Trust Fiction Prize. He was the winner of the Hugh MacLennan Prize for Fiction in 2008 and 2012 for his books Cockroach and Carnival, respectively.

==== Beirut Hellfire Society ====
His 2018 novel Beirut Hellfire Society was named as a longlisted nominee for the Giller Prize, and a shortlisted finalist for both the Rogers Writers' Trust Fiction Prize and the Governor General's Award for English-language fiction.

=== Short story collection ===
His 2022 collection of short stories, Stray Dogs, earned him his fourth Giller Prize nomination.

== Awards and honours ==
Hage in 2011.

=== Wins ===
- 2006 – McAuslan First Book Prize and Paragraphe Hugh MacLennan Prize for Fiction for De Niro's Game.
- 2008 – International IMPAC Dublin Literary Award for De Niro's Game.
- 2008 – Paragraphe Hugh MacLennan Prize for Fiction for Cockroach.
- 2012 – Paragraphe Hugh MacLennan Prize for Fiction for Carnival.

=== Shortlists ===
- 2006 – Governor General's Award for English-language fiction, Rogers Writers' Trust Fiction Prize, and Scotiabank Giller Prize for De Niro's Game.
- 2008 – Governor General's Award for English-language fiction, Rogers Writers' Trust Fiction Prize, and Scotiabank Giller Prize for Cockroach.
- 2012 – Rogers Writers' Trust Fiction Prize for Carnival.
- 2018 – Governor General's Award for English-language fiction, Paragraphe Hugh MacLennan Prize for Fiction, and Rogers Writers' Trust Fiction Prize for Beirut Hellfire Society.
- 2022 – Paragraphe Hugh MacLennan Prize for Fiction and Scotiabank Giller Prize for Stray Dogs.

Hage in Berlin in 2019

=== Longlists ===
- 2018 – Scotiabank Giller Prize for Beirut Hellfire Society.

=== Career honours ===
- 2013 – Named writer in residence at the Vancouver Public Library.
- 2019 – Writers' Trust Engel/Findley Award, a career award from the Writers' Trust of Canada.

=== Recognition for the French translation ===
- 2008 – Sophie Voillot's French translation of De Niro's Game, Parfum de poussière, was shortlisted for the Cole Foundation Prize for Translation.
- 2009 – Parfum de poussière won Le Combat des livres.

== Bibliography ==
- De Niro's Game (2006)
- Cockroach (2008)
- Carnival (2012)
- Beirut Hellfire Society (2018)
- Stray Dogs (2022)
