= Alix Ohlin =

Canadian writer

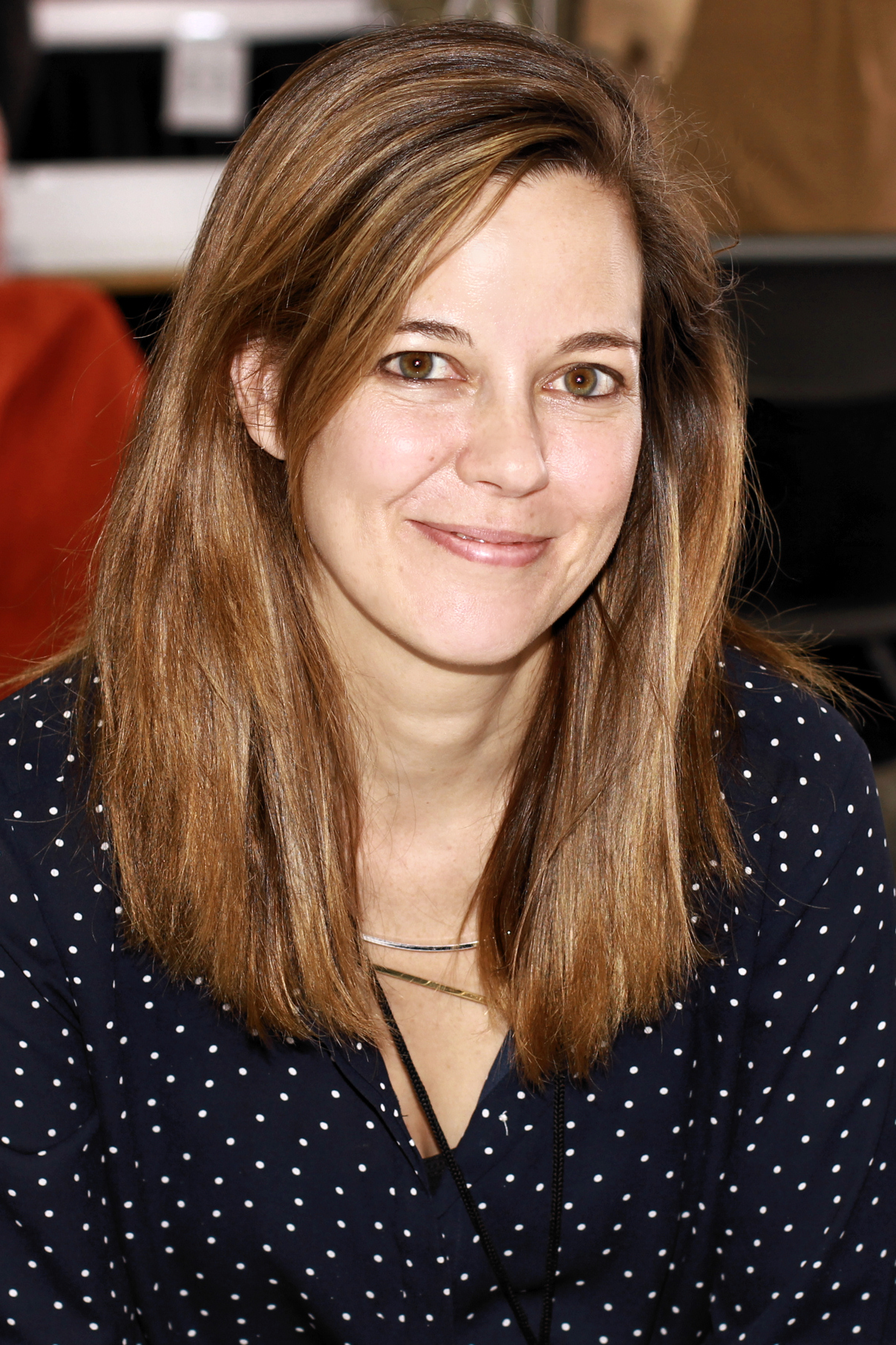
- Ohlin in 2019
- Born: Montreal, Quebec, Canada
- Occupation: Writer
- Writing career
- Period: 2000s-present
- Notable work: Inside
- Website: alixohlinauthor.com

Alix Ohlin is a Canadian novelist and short-story writer. She was born and raised in Montreal, Quebec, and lives in Vancouver, British Columbia. She is a recipient of the 2022 Lambda Literary Award for Bisexual Literature for her short story collection, We Want What We Want.

== Biography ==
On January 1, 2018, Ohlin became the chair of the University of British Columbia's creative writing program. In addition to her appointment as chair, Ohlin also joined the program as an associate professor where she specializes in teaching fiction, screenwriting, and environmental writing, as well as serving as a mentor to younger writers. She led the transition of the Creative Writing Program into the School of Creative Writing, and the establishment of an Equity, Diversity and Inclusion Committee. In July 2022, Ohlin completed her term as Director, and now continues to teach and write within the School of Creative Writing.

Previously, Ohlin taught at McGill University as the Mordecai Richler Writer-in-Residence for 2016–17. Ohlin was also an English professor at Lafayette College in Easton, Pennsylvania, a faculty member in the Warren Wilson College MFA Program for Writers. in North Carolina, and has taught writing at the New York State Summer Writers Institute. She taught and worked at Portsmouth Abbey School, in Rhode Island, as writer-in-residence from the fall of 2002 through the spring of 2004.

Ohlin graduated magna cum laude from Harvard University with an English and American Literature and Language degree in 1992 and earned a master's in fine arts degree in writing from the Michener Center for Writers, University of Texas at Austin in 2001.

Ohlin published her debut novel The Missing Person in 2006, and followed up with the short story collection Babylon and Other Stories in 2007. Her second novel, Inside, and her second short story collection, Signs and Wonders, were both published on the same day in 2012. Inside was a shortlisted nominee for the 2012 Scotiabank Giller Prize and the Rogers Writers' Trust Fiction Prize.

Her newest novel, Dual Citizens, was published in 2019. It was shortlisted for the 2019 Giller Prize, the 2019 Rogers Writers' Trust Fiction Prize, and the 2020 ReLit Award for fiction.

Her short story collection We Want What We Want received the Lambda Literary Award for Bisexual Fiction in 2022, and was shortlisted for the 2021 Atwood Gibson Writers' Trust Fiction Prize, and the 2022 ReLit Award for short fiction.

== Bibliography ==
=== Novels ===
- The Missing Person (2006, ISBN 9781400031382)
- Inside (2012, ISBN 9780307596925)
- Dual Citizens (2019, ISBN 9780525521891)

=== Short fiction ===
Collections

- Babylon and Other Stories (2007, ISBN 9781400031399)
- Signs and Wonders (2012, ISBN 9780307743794)
- We Want What We Want: Stories (2021, ISBN 9780525654636)

Stories

| Title | Year | First published | Reprinted/collected | Notes |
|---|---|---|---|---|
| Quarantine | 2017 | Ohlin, Alix (30 January 2017). "Quarantine". The New Yorker. 92 (47): 56–63. | | |

== Awards ==
| Year | Title | Award | Result | Ref. |
|---|---|---|---|---|
| 2012 | Inside | Giller Prize | Shortlist | |
| 2012 | Inside | Rogers Writers' Trust Fiction Prize | Shortlist | |
| 2019 | Dual Citizens | Giller Prize | Shortlist | |
| 2019 | Dual Citizens | Rogers Writers' Trust Fiction Prize | Shortlist | |
| 2021 | We Want What We Want | Atwood Gibson Writers' Trust Fiction Prize | Shortlist | |
| 2022 | We Want What We Want | Lambda Literary Award for Bisexual Fiction | Winner | |
