= André Alexis =

Canadian writer

- Born: January 15, 1957 (age 69); Port of Spain, Trinidad and Tobago
- Occupations: Novelist, librettist, writer
- Writing career
- Genre: Literary fiction
- Notable work: Childhood (1998); The Quincunx Cycle (2014–2021), including Fifteen Dogs (2015)
- Notable awards: Guggenheim Fellowship (2026)

André Alexis is a Canadian writer who was born in Port of Spain, Trinidad and Tobago, grew up in Ottawa, and now lives in Toronto, Ontario. He has received numerous awards including the Windham-Campbell Literature Prize, the Giller Prize, the Rogers Writers' Trust Fiction Prize, the Trillium Award, and a fellowship in 2026 from the Guggenheim Foundation.

Alexis is best known for his Quincunx Cycle, a series of five novels set in and around Southern Ontario. His second book in that cycle, Fifteen Dogs, won the 2015 Giller Prize and brought both Alexis and his work to greater prominence. He has been compared to contemporary American novelist Percival Everett, with one scholar describing Alexis provisionally as "the Canadian Percival Everett".

== Career ==
Alexis began his artistic career in the theatre, and has held the position of playwright-in-residence at the Canadian Stage Company. His short play Lambton, Kent, and Other Vistas, first produced and performed in 1995, was published as Lambton, Kent in 1999.

His short story collection Despair and Other Stories of Ottawa (1994) was short-listed for the Commonwealth Prize (Canada and Caribbean region).

Alexis's debut novel, Childhood, was published in 1998. It won him the Books in Canada First Novel Award, and was a co-winner of the Trillium Award, which he shared that year with Alice Munro. The book was also shortlisted for the 1998 Giller Prize.

In 2005, Alexis published Ingrid and the Wolf, his first work of juvenile fiction. The book was nominated for the Governor General's Award for English-language Children's Literature in the 2006 Governor General's Awards.

His novel Asylum was published in 2008, and is set in Ottawa during the government of Brian Mulroney.

In 2010, Alexis published Beauty and Sadness, a prose work that one baffled (but still positive) reviewer described as a "collection of non-fiction" featuring "fictional explorations of writers Alexis admires" transposed into small-town Ontario, and concluded that the book as a whole simply "defies categorization". In his introduction, Alexis says that Beauty and Sadness "is a work of geography as much as it is one of 'criticism'"— provided that "you accept that there are countries named Cocteau, Kawabata, Maupassant, and so on." (Beauty and Sadness xvii) He also warns that the "André Alexis" in this book "is not quite me".(ibid. xviii)

The following year, Alexis returned to the theatre, with a new play for Toronto's Tarragon Theatre: Name in Vain (Decalogue Two), to be directed by Richard Rose (then Artistic Director of Tarragon). The play had its premiere on 4 October 2011, and was described as the first in a planned series of ten works by Alexis, each treating one of the Ten Commandments from Exodus Chapter 20 with a different theatrical or conceptual approach. (Cf. Dekalog.) The title refers to what is given as the Second Commandment by St. Augustine and generally in Catholicism (but third in the Talmud, in the Septuagint, and according to Philo): "Thou shalt not take the name of the Lord thy God in vain." (KJV) Alexis's "nearly wordless" play is set in a monastery with a rule of monastic silence; one monk, in a moment of rage, breaks not only his vow of silence but that commandment as well, throwing the community of brethren into upheaval.

In 2013, Alexis published a novella titled A, about a fictional Toronto literary critic named Alexander Baddeley who is obsessed with the work of an elusive poet named Avery Andrews.

Alexis has also written several texts for Canadian composer James Rolfe. Their first collaboration was Rolfe's Fire (1999), a theatrical piece for four voices (two sopranos and two altos) commissioned by the Queen of Puddings Music Theatre Company. Alexis went on to write the libretti for Rolfe's Orpheus and Eurydice (2004) and his chamber opera Aeneas and Dido, which premiered at Toronto Masque Theatre in 2007.

In 2014, Rolfe and Alexis collaborated again, in a commission for the Canadian Art Song Project. Alexis wrote "a new cycle of six poems that trace the journey of the sleeper from darkness to light" from which Rolfe composed a song cycle, Moths, premiered by Canadian baritone Brett Polegato and pianist Steven Philcox.

=== The Quincunx Cycle (2014–2021) ===
Also in 2014, Alexis published Pastoral, the first in a planned series of five books on philosophical themes called the Quincunx Cycle. Alexis has said that he had planned the cycle and completed Pastoral as early as 2009, but was unable to find a publisher until he came to Coach House Books in Toronto.

Alexis has described his plan for the cycle as having been inspired by Thomas Browne's The Garden of Cyrus, or The Quincuncial Lozenge, or Network Plantations of the Ancients, naturally, artificially, mystically considered (1658). Browne's frontispiece features an epigraph from Quintillian's Institutio Oratoria (VIII.3.ix) on the planting of fruit trees:

quid illo quincunce speciosius, qui, in quamcumque partem spectaveris, rectus est?

What more splendid prospect than [trees planted in] the quincunx?— which, however you might look, offers straight lines to the eye.

Fifteen Dogs, the second book in Alexis's Quincunx, was published in 2015. It won him the 2015 Scotiabank Giller Prize and the Rogers Writers' Trust Fiction Prize, was shortlisted for a Toronto Book Award, and went on to win the Canada Reads competition in 2017.

The third book in the cycle, The Hidden Keys, was published in 2016, notably labelled "Quincunx 4".

In 2017, Alexis won the prestigious Windham-Campbell Prize, awarded by the Beinecke Rare Book and Manuscript Library at Yale University, for his body of work to date. The Windham-Campbell judges praised his "astonishingly clear, supple prose that propels readers through the complex philosophical questions... that have preoccupied him through two decades of work." Alexis also sat as a juror for that year's Scotiabank Giller Prize.

The next book in his cycle, Days by Moonlight (Quincunx 5) was published in 2019, winning Alexis his second Rogers Writers' Trust Fiction Prize. The book was also longlisted for the 2019 Giller Prize. While promoting the book, Alexis suggested that after the final part of the cycle had been published, he would revise the entire cycle.

While completing the cycle, Alexis also wrote Metamorphosis: a Viral Trilogy, a three-part audio drama inspired by the COVID-19 pandemic in Canada, which was released in conjunction with TO Live, SummerWorks and Canadian Stage. In October 2020, his career-spanning collection of short stories, The Night Piece, was published by Penguin Random House Canada.

Alexis published the fifth and final instalment Ring (Quincunx 3) in 2021.

== Other work ==
In 2022, Alexis published his first post-Quincunx work, Winter, or A Town Near Palgrave, about the mysterious hibernation practices of a group of secretive people in a small town called "N___ " near Palgrave, Ontario. However, in an interview later that same year, Alexis confirmed that the Quincunx cycle was as yet unfinished, and that he would rewrite and re-release it as a single volume:

It's not over because I'm going to rewrite all five novels. It's not a major rewrite, but I'm going to make sure that there are no editorial flaws. Some incidents happen at the wrong time that need to be made internally consistent. The important thing for me about the Quincunx is not that there is a narrative unity; you don't start out at one end and go to the other just to discover some narrative truth. It's a matter of patternings; psychological patterns, geometric ones – each novel is five chapters, the denouement comes in Chapter 4, Chapter 5 is a settling of accounts. It's like being in a garden; right now, you can see all the plots, but I'll just get rid of a few of the weeds. It will come out again as a single volume edition called A Quincunx with Coach House Books. The novels will be in the order they were released, but if you enter them at various points, people can see different things. I love the idea that my order is only one of many.

Alexis continues to live and work in Toronto, where he has hosted programming for CBC Radio, reviews books for The Globe and Mail, and is a contributing editor for This Magazine. He is an adjunct professor in the MA in English and Creative Writing program at the University of Toronto, and was formerly Writer in Residence at the University of Ottawa, and a Barker Fairley Distinguished Visitor in Canadian Studies at University College in the University of Toronto.

His short story collection Other Worlds was longlisted for the 2025 Giller Prize and won The Story Prize.

== Works and awards ==
- Despair and Other Stories of Ottawa (1994), ISBN 0-8050-5980-6

Published in the UK as The Night Piece (1999), ISBN 0-7475-4461-1

- Childhood (1998), ISBN 0-88910-505-7

Books in Canada First Novel Award
Trillium Award (joint winner with Alice Munro)
Shortlist, Giller Prize

- Lambton Kent (1999, drama), ISBN 1-896356-27-3
- Ingrid and the Wolf (2005, children's novel), ISBN 0-88776-691-9

Nominated for Governor General's Award for English-language Children's Literature, 2006 Governor General's Awards

- Asylum (2008), ISBN 978-0-7710-0669-2
- Beauty and Sadness (2010), ISBN 978-0887847509
- A (2013) ISBN 9781927040799
- Pastoral (Quincunx 1, 2014), ISBN 9781552452868
- Fifteen Dogs (Quincunx 2, 2015), ISBN 9781552453056

Scotiabank Giller Prize
Rogers Writers' Trust Fiction Prize
Shortlist, Toronto Book Award
Canada Reads Competition (2017)

- The Hidden Keys (Quincunx 4, 2016), ISBN 1-55245-325-1
- Windham-Campbell Prize (2017, for body of work to date)
- Days by Moonlight (Quincunx 5, 2019), ISBN 978-1552453797

Rogers Writers' Trust Fiction Prize

- The Night Piece: Collected Short Fiction (2020)
- Ring (Quincunx 3, 2021) ISBN 978-1552454305
- Winter, or A Town Near Palgrave (2022), ISBN 9781552454534
- Other Worlds (2025), ISBN 9780771006241

Winner, The Story Prize
