= Michael Helm =

Canadian novelist (born 1961)

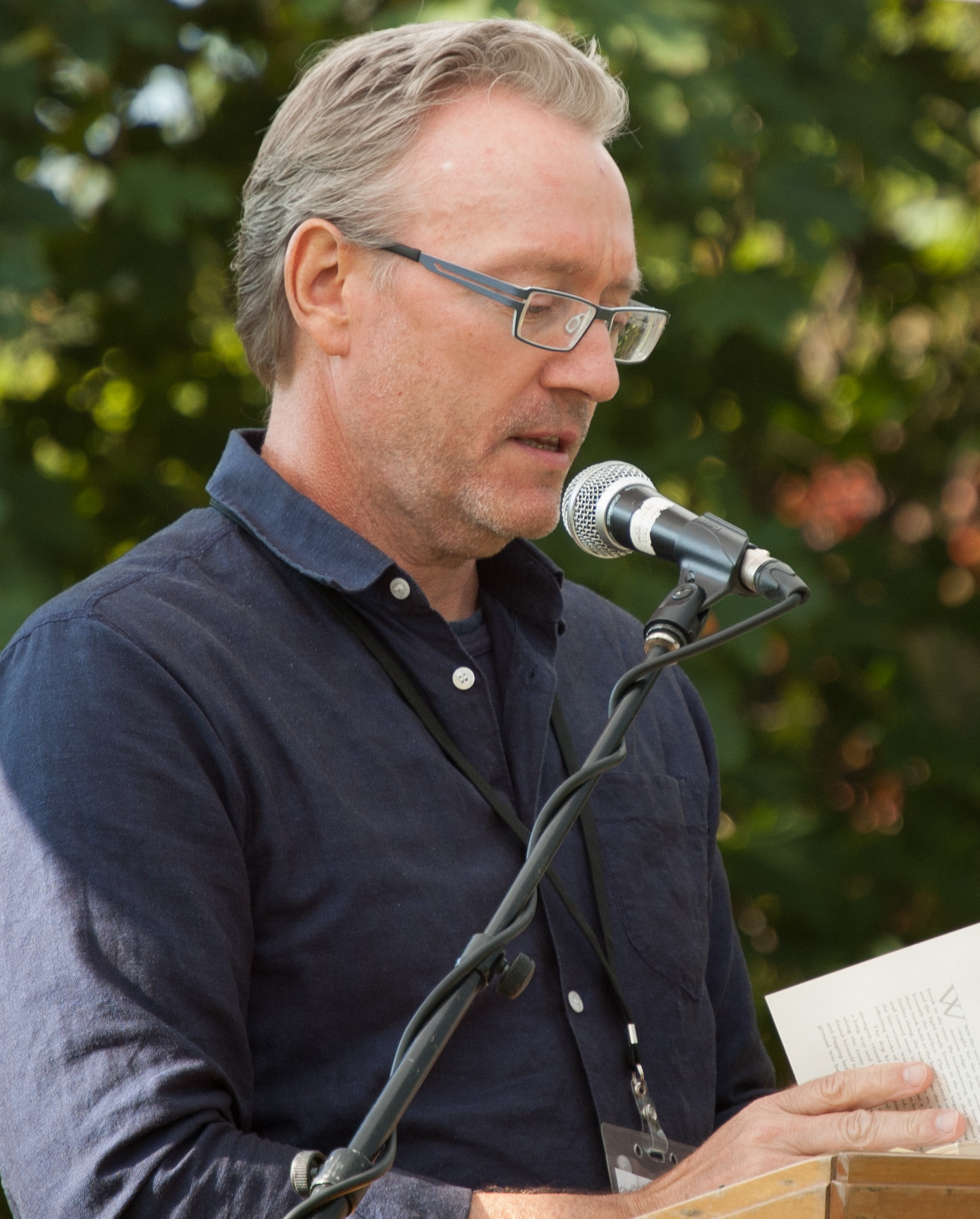
- Helm at the Eden Mills Writers' Festival in 2017

Michael Helm is a Canadian novelist. He was born 1961 in Eston, Saskatchewan, and received degrees in literature from the University of Saskatchewan and the University of Toronto.

His debut novel, The Projectionist (1997), was nominated for the Giller Prize and the Trillium Book Award. His second novel, In the Place of Last Things (2004) was a finalist for the regional Commonwealth Prize for Best Book and the Rogers Writers' Trust Fiction Prize. His 2010 novel Cities of Refuge was shortlisted for the Rogers Writers' Trust Fiction Prize, longlisted for the Giller Prize, and named a Globe and Mail Best Book of the Year and a Now Magazine Top Ten of 2010.

Helm's essays on fiction, poetry, and the visual arts have appeared in various magazines, including Brick, where he serves as an editor. Helm currently teaches in the Department of English at York University in Toronto.

Helm was awarded a Guggenheim Fellowship in 2019.

== Bibliography ==
- The Projectionist - 1997
- In the Place of Last Things - 2004
- Cities of Refuge - 2010
- After James - 2016
