= Conor Kerr =

Canadian writer

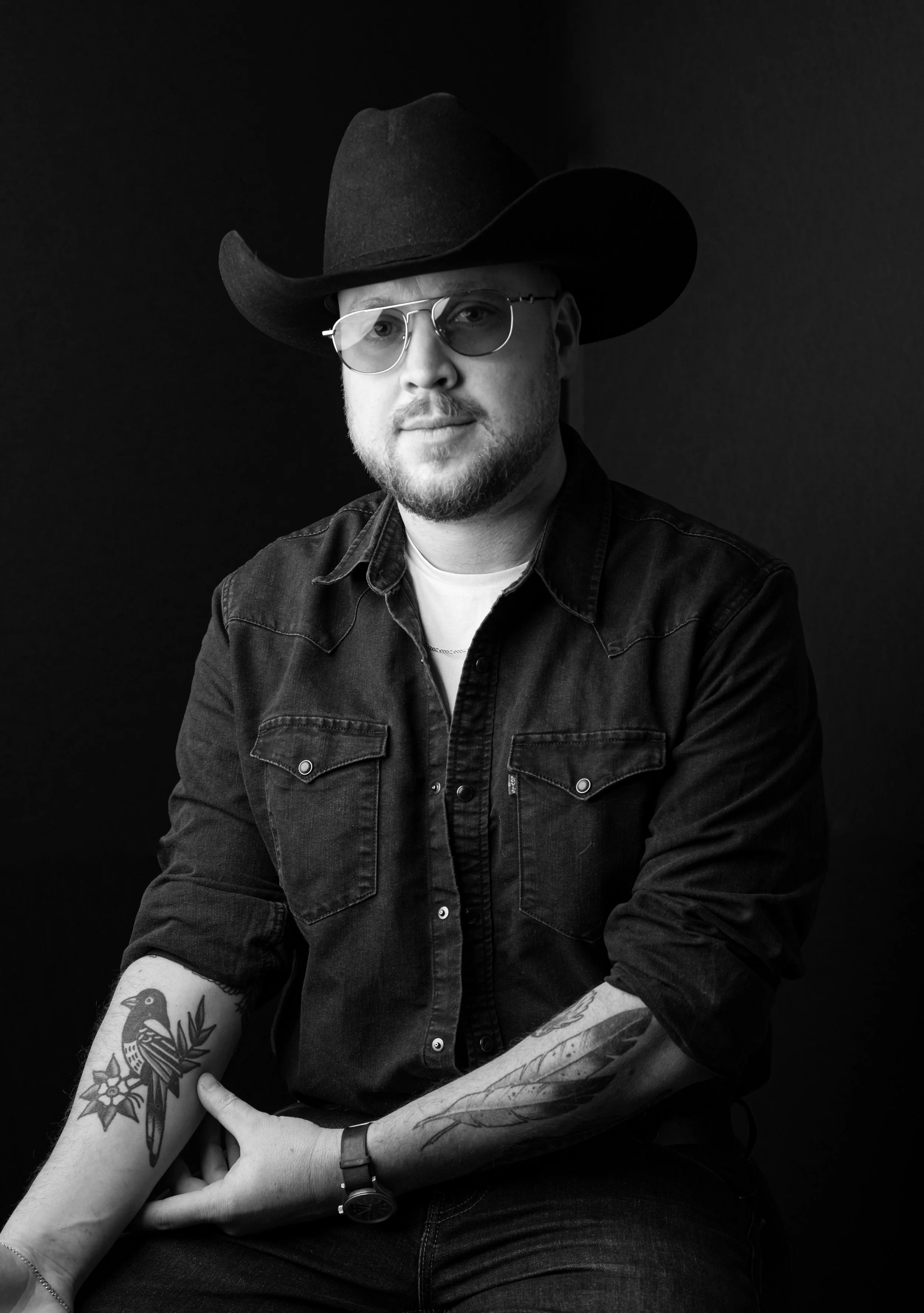
Conor Kerr

Conor Kerr is a Métis and Ukrainian writer from Edmonton, Alberta. He is currently an assistant professor at University of Alberta.

His debut novel Avenue of Champions, published in 2021, was the winner of the ReLit Award for Fiction in 2022, and was shortlisted for the 2022 Amazon.ca First Novel Award and longlisted for the 2022 Giller Prize. Named for the ceremonial name of 118 Avenue in Edmonton as the "Avenue of Champions" due to the location of the Northlands Coliseum, the novel focuses on the coming of age of a young Métis man.

His second novel, Prairie Edge, won the Crime Writers of Canada Miller-Martin Award for Best Crime Novel, and was shortlisted for the 2024 Giller Prize and the Atwood Gibson Writers' Trust Fiction Prize. It concerns a pair of activists who contrive to take a herd of bison from Elk Island National Park and let them loose in Edmonton's North Saskatchewan River valley parks.

Kerr has also published the poetry collection An Explosion of Feathers. In 2019, he was the winner of The Fiddlehead's Ralph Gustafson Poetry Prize, and in 2021 he was the winner of the Malahat Review's Long Poem Prize. In 2023, his poetry collection Old Gods was a finalist for the Governor General's Award for English-language poetry.

== Bibliography ==
=== Novels ===
- Avenue of Champions (Nightwood Editions, 2021)
- Prairie Edge (Strange Light, University of Minnesota Press, 2024)
- Duck Blind (Strange Light, 2027)

=== Poetry collections ===
- Explosion of Feathers (BookLand Press, 2021)
- Old Gods (Nightwood Editions, 2023)
