= Ashraf Zaghal =

Palestinian Canadian writer

Ashraf Zaghal is a Palestinian Canadian writer, whose debut novel Seven Heavens Away was published in 2026.

Born and raised in Jerusalem, Zaghal emigrated to Canada in 2006 to study environmental engineering at the University of Toronto, and has since also pursued graduate studies at the University of British Columbia and the University of Guelph. He previously published four collections of Arabic language poetry.

Seven Heavens Away was a shortlisted finalist for the 2026 Atwood Gibson Writers' Trust Fiction Prize.

== Works ==
- Wheels of Ashes - 1998, poetry
- Sleeping as I See - 2001, poetry
- A Desert in the Metro - 2013, poetry
- Portrait of the Ugly Family - 2016, poetry
- Seven Heavens Away - 2026, fiction
