= Cockroach (novel) =

2008 book by Rawi Hage

- First edition
- Author: Rawi Hage
- Genre: Dark, Comedy
- Publisher: House of Anansi Press
- Publication date: 2008
- Pages: 305

Cockroach is a dark comedy book by Canadian author Rawi Hage. It was released in 2008, published by Anansi. It is a teen/adult book for advanced literature.

== Plot ==
A man, who is an immigrant from the Middle East, moves to the slums of Montreal, where he learns that he is stuck in poverty. When he tries to take his own life, a "man in a speedo" saves him. He is then sentenced to therapy, where he explains his horrid childhood and how he believes that he is a cockroach. He is also in love with a girl, Shohreh, and is friends/enemies with a man named Reza. He gets a job at a restaurant, and can't help but stare at his boss' daughter. He also steals from every rich man and poor woman. Throughout the book the man starts to slowly change, for better and worse.

== Reception ==
The novel was a shortlisted finalist for the 2008 Giller Prize, the 2008 Rogers Writers' Trust Fiction Prize, the 2008 Governor General's Award for English-language fiction and the 2008 Grand prix du livre de Montréal.

It was selected for inclusion in the 2014 edition of CBC Radio's Canada Reads, where it was defended by Samantha Bee.
