= Lynn Coady =

Canadian novelist and journalist

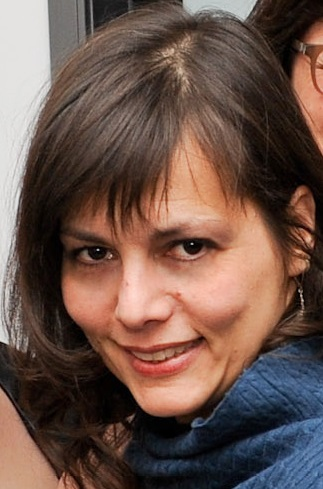
- Lynn Coady in 2014
- Born: January 24, 1970 (age 56); Port Hawkesbury, Nova Scotia
- Occupations: novelist, short story writer
- Writing career
- Period: 1990s–present
- Notable works: Strange Heaven, The Antagonist, Hellgoing
- Notable awards: Scotiabank Giller Prize; 2013 Hellgoing
- Website: www.lynncoady.com

Lynn Coady (born January 24, 1970) is a Canadian novelist and journalist.

== Life and career ==
Coady was born and grew up in Port Hawkesbury, Nova Scotia. After high school, she attended Carleton University in Ottawa; after graduating, she moved to New Brunswick, where she worked at odd jobs for several years and began a career as a playwright. In 1996, she relocated to Vancouver, British Columbia, where she earned a Master of Fine Arts degree in creative writing from the University of British Columbia. In 2006, she moved to Edmonton and taught creative writing at Athabasca University, where she developed a new course in writing the short story. In 2007, she moved to Toronto to work at Anansi Press.

Coady's first book, Strange Heaven (1998), was nominated for a Governor General's Award. The novel is set in Nova Scotia, giving Coady the opportunity to paint a different picture of her home province. Strange Heaven touches on the life of Bridget Murphy who has been admitted to a psychiatric ward after birthing a child who was put up for adoption. Upon returning to her Cape Breton home Murphy sees everything and everyone in a different light but still manages to find solace in this bizarre and somewhat dysfunctional home.

Coady's second book, Play the Monster Blind (2000), was a national bestseller and a "Best Book" of 2000 for The Globe and Mail. Saints of Big Harbour (2002) was a Globe and Mail "Best Book" in 2002.

Mean Boy was recognized as a "Best Book" in 2006. The novel is a first person account of 19-year-old Lawrence Campbell during his first year of university in a small New Brunswick town. The year is 1975 and Campbell has dreams of becoming a poet. He was drawn away from his rural Prince Edward Island home by the allure of studying with his poet hero, Jim Arsenault. As Campbell progresses through the year, much of Arsenault's shine wears off and Campbell learns that people are not always what one expects, but rather are complex and multi-dimensional.

Coady's 2011 novel The Antagonist concerns the life of Gordon Rankin, Coady's fictional character known more commonly in the novel as Rank. The character reflects how being cast as a hockey goon and tough guy impacted his life. In response to a novel written about him by an old university friend Rank dedicates himself to providing his own account of events from his past. The reader is brought into Rank's world and exposed to his hurts, joys, and ultimately the realization that one must narrate their own lives and reject the labels others may try to give you. This novel was shortlisted for the 2011 Scotiabank Giller Prize.

Coady's 2013 book, Hellgoing is a collection of short stories, each about characters going through their own personal versions of hell. Despite this, the stories prompt laughing far more often than tears. This book was the winner of the 2013 Scotiabank Giller Prize.

Coady has been awarded the Canadian Authors Association/Air Canada Award for the best writer under thirty, as well as the Dartmouth Book and Writing Award for fiction. Her articles and reviews have been featured in many publications, including Saturday Night, This Magazine, and Chatelaine. She has written several plays, and contributes regularly to The Globe and Mail.

In 2017, Coady was announced as juror for the 2017 Scotiabank Giller Prize.

Coady now lives in Toronto, Ontario.

== Bibliography ==
=== Novels ===
- Strange Heaven (1998)
- Saints of Big Harbour (2002)
- Mean Boy (2006)
- The Antagonist (2011)
- Watching You Without Me (2019)

=== Short stories ===
- Play the Monster Blind (2000)
- Hellgoing (2013) (won the 2013 Scotiabank Giller Prize)

=== Non-fiction ===
- Who Needs Books? Reading in the Digital Age (University of Alberta Press, 2016)

=== Anthologies ===
- Victory Meat: New Fiction from Atlantic Canada (2003) (editor)
- Penguin Book of Contemporary Canadian Women's Short Stories (2006) (contributor)
- Penguin Book of Canadian Short Stories (2007) (contributor)
- The Anansi Reader: Forty Years of Very Good Books (2007) (editor)
- The Journey Prize Stories 20: The Best of Canada's New Writers (2008) (co-editor)
- Great Expectations (2008) House of Anansi (contributor)
- Sex and Death (2016) (contributor)
