= The White Bone =

1999 novel by Barbara Gowdy

The White Bone is a Canadian novel written by Barbara Gowdy and published by HarperCollins in 1999. It was nominated for the Scotiabank Giller Prize in 1998. Sometimes compared to Richard Adams's Watership Down, it is an adult fantasy story about animals—in this case, African elephants—in a realistic natural setting but given the ability to speak to one another throughout the book. Subsequently, the elephants are given anthropomorphized personalities and have created their own religion, folklore, and customs, all based on the author's research on elephant behavior.

The novel includes a map of the section of African landscape that the story occurs in, as well as several family trees of the elephant characters and a glossary of terms used in elephant speech (unlike in Watership Down, the characters do not speak their own language, but use certain words to define objects not found in their language, such as "big grass" for bamboo and "delirium" for estrus).

== Plot ==
The novel is told entirely from the points of view of its elephant characters. Much like real elephants, all female elephants (cows) and prepubescent males (bulls) live in matrilineal family groups, and mature male elephants are loners. The main characters in the novel are mostly from the "She-S" family, into which Mud, a young cow who is pregnant with her first calf, has been adopted. Mud is blessed with visionary powers and can occasionally see into the future. Thrown into a drought, with human poachers becoming increasingly common, Mud and her family must find the legendary "Safe Place" where drought and poachers do not come. The "White Bone," a rib of a newborn elephant, is rumored to be lying somewhere in the savannah and is said to point in the direction of the Safe Place. After a slaughter which leaves most of Mud's adoptive family dead and her best friend, Date Bed, missing, Mud and the remaining She-S elephants set off to find the White Bone and Date Bed.

The novel is rather nihilistic, as it is unlikely that any of the characters ever reach the Safe Place, with a few possible exceptions. Hence, it is considered a powerful social commentary on the plight of endangered animals, showing their situation to be somewhat hopeless. Another main theme of the novel is the importance of family ties, and the fact that Mud, as an adopted member of the She-S family, feels alienated from the other elephants throughout.

Another theme of the novel acknowledges the old saying, "An elephant never forgets." The novel implies that elephants will eventually go senile, but as most are killed before their prime, the saying is usually true. The elephants are capable of remembering every minute detail of their lives, unlike humans, who tend to remember important events most strongly.

== Characters ==
Mud (She-Spurns) A young female elephant. Mud was abandoned by her birth family, the She-M's, as an infant, and was taken in by a somewhat reluctant She-S family. Although she is able to have visions of future events, and current events taking place elsewhere, she is rather sullen and antisocial and is only readily accepted by several members of the She-S's. Recently impregnated for the first time, Mud is shown trying to come to terms with her pregnancy in the middle of a drought and her feelings of alienation in her adoptive family throughout. As the story progresses, she finds herself needing to become hard-hearted and willing to make sacrifices as she becomes more and more concerned with finding the Safe Place, while her companions remain focused on finding a missing elephant, Date Bed, and lose willpower, becoming emaciated and hopeless. Her emotional abandonment of Date Bed is one of the turning points in the novel.

Date Bed A young female elephant. Date Bed is Mud's best friend and a member of the She-S family. She is the family's "mind talker," and is able to read the minds of not only elephants but of animals of other species. She is pleasant, eloquent, and soft-spoken, and aware of the fact that she loves a male elephant, Tall Time, in a way that is unnatural for her species; however, she is sexually immature and has never mated. When she becomes separated from her family during a slaughter, she spends much of the book trying to find them again, as well as the White Bone.

Tall Time A male elephant. Tall Time is a tall and lanky loner elephant who mentally collects and categorises all known omens and superstitions. He goes off on his own to find the Lost Ones, a troupe of Forest elephants, in order to gain information from them on omens and the White Bone. He is the father of Mud's baby, and loves Mud to an unnatural extent, wanting to start a herd with her although this custom is unheard of amongst elephants.

She-Snorts A female elephant. She-Snorts is an alluring, droll, sensual elephant, with the most powerful sense of smell in the family, and the mother of Date Bed. Not used to being given responsibilities, she finds herself the matriarch of her family herd after all of her older family members are killed in a slaughter. As the novel progresses, she becomes more grave and severe, and more single-mindedly focused on finding her daughter. Pregnant with another calf, she bargains with Me-Me the cheetah to show them the way to the Safe Place in exchange for the calf she will soon give birth to; this becomes an important plot element of the book.

She-Soothes A female elephant. She-Soothes is a physically tough but kind-hearted elephant, and as the nurse cow of the family, she is an effective healer. Although optimistic, she is not sentimental and uses the phrase, "What's done is done!" after any tragedy. This phrase becomes a way for herself and Mud to ward off grief as the story progresses. She is the mother of the partially crippled infant, Bent, and is fiercely protective of him. She likes the sound of her name so much that she refers to herself in the third person.

She-Screams A female elephant. She-Screams is a repulsive elephant, both in looks and in personality, and the main cause of tension in her family. She is banished from the family by She-Snorts for suggesting that Date Bed is dead and strongly hates Mud, but tries to gain acceptance after claiming to have inherited the wisdom from a family of slaughtered elephants she encountered while banished. Although she is highly unpleasant, Mud cannot help feeling some kinship for She-Screams, because both are out-of-place in the She-S family.

Torrent An old male elephant. Torrent is the wisest and most knowledgeable and proud elephant in the novel, and is a friend of Tall Time's. He is known for being very soulful and valiant, although he starts to become senile from his old age.

Me-Me A female cheetah with a taste for baby elephant. Me-Me cannot communicate with the She-S's through words, so through body language she establishes that she can show the elephants where the Safe Place is, in exchange for She-Snorts's and Mud's unborn calves.

Bent A baby male elephant, and the son of She-Soothes. Bent is the innocent voice of the group, but he is slightly crippled and becomes a liability as the story progresses, although he is fiercely defended by his family.

Hail Stones A young male elephant, and the last surviving member of the She-D family, Hail Stones joins Mud and her companions on their search for the White Bone and Date Bed. He acts somewhat like Date Bed or a young Torrent, as he speaks eloquently and tries to comfort the She-S family even after the death of his entire family, without complaint. Mud finds herself drawn to him.

Swamp A young male elephant. He is rather antisocial and sardonic, but is surprisingly motivated to help Hail Stones after the two become friends. However, he shows little attachment to the rest of his family, especially his mother, She-Screams.

She-Scares A female elephant, and Mud's adoptive mother. She is one of the few elephants of the She-S family who accepts Mud.

The Lost Ones A family of elephants, also known as the We-F's, who are forest elephants. They are self-centered, and all possess visionary capabilities.
