= Fifteen Dogs =

2015 novel by André Alexis

Fifteen Dogs: An Apologue
- First edition cover
- Author: André Alexis
- Audio read by: André Alexis
- Language: English
- Series: The Quincunx Cycle #2
- Genre: Science fiction
- Set in: Toronto
- Publisher: Coach House Books
- Publication date: March 23, 2015 (ebook); April 14, 2015 (paperback)
- Publication place: Canada
- Media type: Print (paperback), ebook
- Pages: 160 pp.
- Awards: 2015 Scotiabank Giller Prize; 2015 Rogers Writers' Trust Fiction Prize
- ISBN: 9781552453056 (paperback); 9781770564039 (ebook)
- OCLC: 897352759
- Preceded by: Pastoral
- Followed by: Ring

Fifteen Dogs: An Apologue is a novel by Canadian writer André Alexis. Published by Coach House Books in 2015, the novel was the winner of the 2015 Scotiabank Giller Prize and the 2015 Rogers Writers' Trust Fiction Prize, as well as the 2017 edition of Canada Reads.

It is the second novel in a planned cycle of a five-novel quincunx that Alexis will use to examine faith, place, love, power and hatred, the first being Pastoral, which was published in 2014.

An apologue, the novel tells the story of a group of 15 dogs, kennelled at a veterinary clinic in Toronto, who are suddenly gifted by the gods with human consciousness and language.

== Plot ==
Over drinks at Toronto's Wheat Sheaf Tavern, Hermes and Apollo get into a debate about whether animals could live happily if they had the same cognitive and speech abilities as humans. They decide to wager a year of servitude on the outcome of granting the gifts of human reasoning and language to a group of dogs in a nearby clinic.

Given their newfound abilities, the dogs are able to escape the clinic and make their way to the city's High Park, where they set up their own new protosociety. The novel then explores the functioning of their new society through the impact of human values, such as individuality and personal freedom, on the conventionally hierarchical social order of dog packs. Key characters in the canine society include Atticus, a Neapolitan Mastiff who naturally emerges as the group leader; Majnoun, a black poodle who is reluctant to trust other dogs; Frick and Frack, a pair of Labrador Retrievers who are leery about their new reality; and Prince, a mutt who embraces his language skills to become a poet.

== Themes ==
=== Language ===
The dogs develop their own language, which creates conflict in the pack. Prince becomes a poet and his passion for language is a source of pleasure for him. Some dogs appreciate his use of poetry and wit, but other dogs find it strange and hate it. Majnoun learns to understand and speak English, which forges a bond between him and a human (Nira) as they have long conversations and learn about one another.

=== Death ===
The immortal gods Apollo and Hermes are fascinated with mortals on Earth because of their relationship with death. Throughout the book, the reader learns how each dog dies and whether or not the dog died happy. The death plots include murder and euthanasia. The death of humans is also part of the narrative along with how the dogs respond.

=== Poetry ===
The novel includes several poems composed by Prince. At the end, the author includes a "note on the text" where he describes the poetry genre used throughout the novel.

=== Love and friendship ===
Several dogs form friendships (Bella and Athena; Dougie and Benjy) that they experience differently because of their gift of intelligence. Majnoun asks Hermes about love and Prince loves language.

== Awards and honors ==
It won the 2015 Scotiabank Giller Prize and the Rogers Writers' Trust Fiction Prize, and was shortlisted for a Toronto Book Award.

== Adaptations ==
A theatrical adaptation, written and directed by Marie Farsi, premiered at the Crow's Theatre in Toronto in January 2023.

An animated adaptation is currently being optioned for buyers at the European Film Market. Chris Landreth will direct and Steve Hoban will write and produce through his Copperheart Entertainment company.
