= Colin McAdam (novelist) =

Canadian novelist

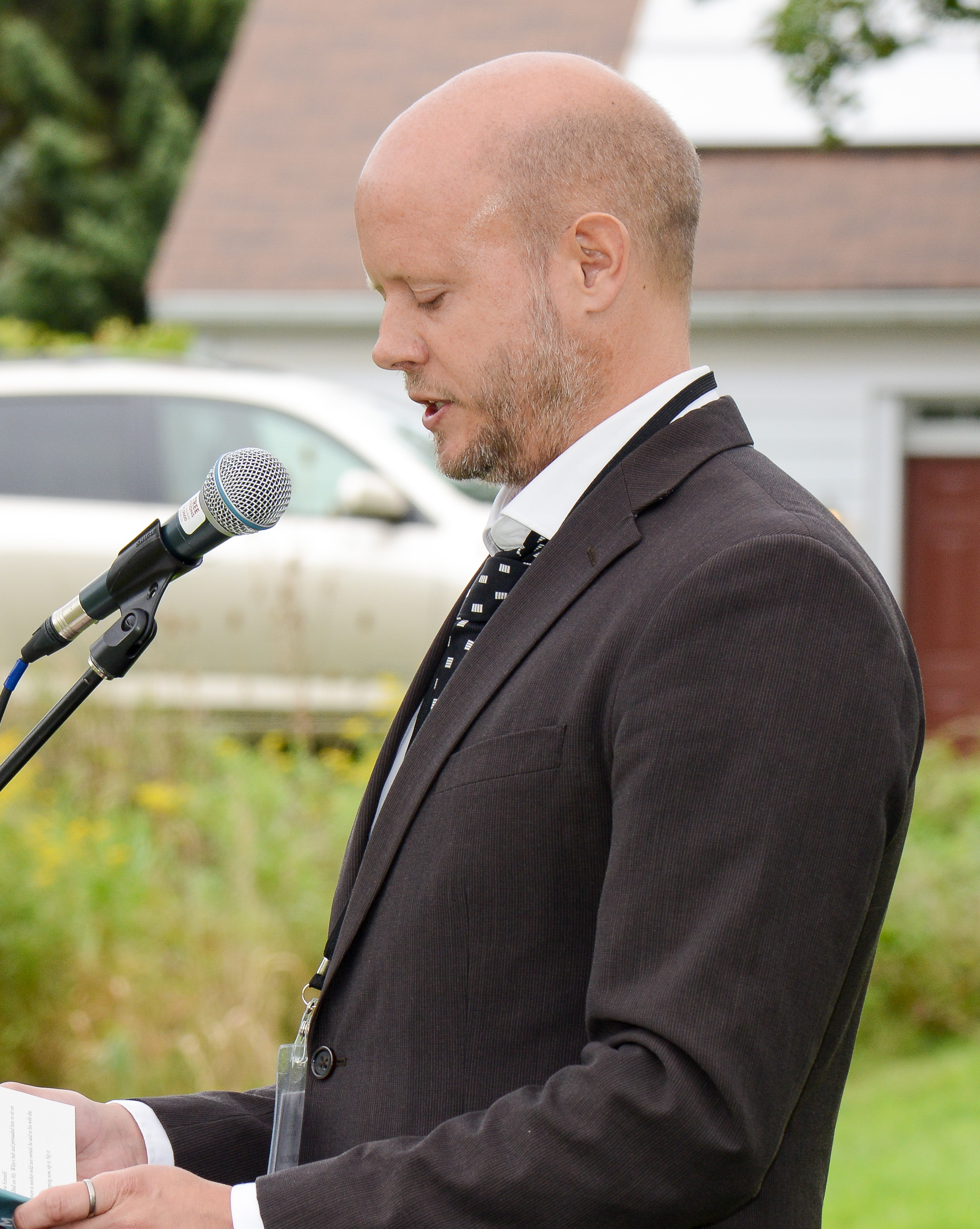
- McAdam at the Eden Mills Writers' Festival in 2013
- Born: Hong Kong
- Education: • McGill University • University of Toronto • University of Cambridge(PhD)
- Occupation: Writer
- Partner: Suzanne Hancock

Colin McAdam is a Canadian novelist.

== Early life and education ==
McAdam was born in Hong Kong 1971 and grew up in Barbados, Denmark and England, as well as in several cities in Canada.

McAdam studied English and classics at McGill University, located in Montreal, Quebec; and the University of Toronto, Toronto, Ontario. He received a Doctor of Philosophy degree in English literature from the University of Cambridge, Cambridge, England. His PhD thesis is a study of translations of Ancient Greek into English in the Seventeenth Century.

== Career ==
McAdam has written for the periodicals Harper's Magazine and The Walrus.

McAdam's first novel, Some Great Thing (2004), won the Books in Canada First Novel Award and was a finalist for the Governor General's Award for English-language fiction, the Rogers Writers' Trust Fiction Prize, the Commonwealth Writers' Prize (Best First Book), and the John Llewellyn Rhys Prize in the United Kingdom.

His second novel, Fall (2009) won the Paragraphe Hugh MacLennan Prize for Fiction, and was shortlisted for the Scotiabank Giller Prize.

His third novel, A Beautiful Truth (2013) won the Rogers Writers' Trust Fiction Prize.

Daphnis and Chloe was longlisted for the 2026 Giller Prize.

== Bibliography ==
- Some Great Thing (2004, Harcourt). ISBN 978-0-15-101028-8.
- Fall (2009, Riverhead Books). ISBN 978-1-59448-868-9.
- A Beautiful Truth (2013)
- Black Dove (2022)
- Daphnis and Chloe (2026)

== Personal life ==
McAdam lives in Toronto with poet and former Barzin drummer, Suzanne Hancock. He has two children, one from an earlier marriage to Australian author, Jaclyn Moriarty.
