= Sylvia Fraser =

Canadian novelist, journalist and travel writer

- Born: Sylvia Lois Meyers; 8 March 1935; Hamilton, Ontario, Canada
- Died: 25 October 2022 (aged 87); Toronto, Ontario
- Education: University of Western Ontario; Banff Centre
- Occupations: Author; Activist; Lecturer; Professor; Journalist
- Spouse: Russell Fraser (m. 1957)
- Parent(s): George Meyers (father); Gladys (mother)
- Writing career
- Years active: 1957–2015
- Period: Contemporary
- Genres: Fiction; Historical fiction; Memoir
- Literary movement: Child sexual abuse activism
- Website: Sylvia Fraser Archive at McMaster University

Sylvia Fraser (born Sylvia Lois Meyers; 8 March 1935 – 25 October 2022) was a Canadian novelist, journalist and travel writer. Fraser was educated at the University of Western Ontario. In Fraser's long year career as a journalist, Fraser wrote hundreds of articles, beginning as a feature writer for the Toronto Star Weekly (1957–68), and continuing with articles for many other magazines and newspapers including The Globe and Mail, Saturday Night, Chatelaine, The Walrus and Toronto Life. Fraser taught creative writing for many years at the Banff Centre and at various university workshops.

Fraser participated in extensive media tours, gave lectures and readings throughout Canada, the United States, Britain and Sweden. Fraser served on the Arts Advisory Panel to the Canada Council and was a member of Canada Council's 1985 cultural delegation to China. Fraser was a founding member of the Writers' Union of Canada and for many years was on the executive of the Writers' Trust of Canada, a charitable organization for the support of Canadian authors and literature. Fraser lived in Toronto, Ontario.

== Early life and education ==
Sylvia Lois Meyers was born in Hamilton, Ontario, the second daughter of George and Gladys Meyers. Her father, a former World War One lieutenant, worked for the Steel Company of Canada and her mother was involved in Livingstone United Church and community work. In 1957, Fraser married Russell Fraser, a lawyer. After Toronto Star Weekly ceased publication in 1968, Fraser began writing novels.

Fraser was repeatedly sexually abused by her father from her early childhood to her late teens, which became a recurring topic in several of her fiction and non-fiction works, including Pandora, My Father's House, The Book of Strange, and The Ancestral Suitcase. However, Fraser repressed these memories for most of her life, and did not remember them until Fraser began writing about it in these works.

== Career ==
Fraser's first novel, Pandora, tells the story of a young girl who is sexually abused by the man who delivers bread to her house. It was highly regarded for its prose and launched Fraser's career in Canadian Literature.

In 1983, while lunching with friends Ms. Fraser suddenly and clearly remembered the abuse she had suffered from her father. Afterward, Fraser divested her possessions and moved to California where she spent the next two years writing the book that helped deal with the pain and trauma of the abuse. The resulting memoir, My Father's House (1987), recounts the sexual abuse she was subject to from her father throughout her childhood. The book had multiple hardcover and paperback printings and was translated into eight languages. It won the Canadian Authors Association Literary Award for non-fiction. Scholars have asserted that it sets an exemplary model of the process of surviving trauma.

Her subsequent books, The Book of Strange (1992, also published by a second publisher that same year under the title The Quest for the Fourth Monkey: a thinker's guide to the psychic and spiritual revolution) and The Ancestral Suitcase (1996) deal with nonlinear time, reincarnation, and memory.

In addition to her books, Fraser taught creative writing at the Banff Centre for the Arts and wrote profiles for Toronto Life and other magazines. Fraser also ghostwrote memoirs, including Unsinkable (2014), for Olympic rower Silken Laumann, and Open Heart, Open Mind (2015) for Olympic cyclist and speed skater Clara Hughes.

== Bibliography ==
- Pandora - 1972
- The Candy Factory - 1975
- A Casual Affair - 1978
- The Emperor's Virgin - 1980
- Berlin Solstice - 1984
- My Father's House - 1987
- The Book of Strange - 1992 - published simultaneously as The Quest for the Fourth Monkey: a thinker's guide to the psychic and spiritual revolution
- The Ancestral Suitcase - 1996
- The Rope in the Water: A Pilgrimage to India - 2001
- The Green Labyrinth: Exploring the Mysteries of the Amazon - 2003

CHILDREN'S FICTION: Tom & Francine (1998). EDITOR: A Woman's Place: seventy years in the lives of Canadian Women (1997).

== Awards and honours ==
Women's Press Club, 1967 and 1968.

President's Medal, for Canadian journalism, 1968.

Canadian Authors' Association Non-Fiction Book Award, 1987 for My Father's House.

Feminist Book Fortnight Selection, U.K., 1987. My Father's House.

American Library Association Booklist Medal,1994, for The Quest for the Fourth Monkey.

National Magazine Gold Medal, 1994, 2004, 2005.

National Magazine Silver Medal, 1996 & 2002.

Western Magazine Gold Medal, 2006.

Phoenix Women Rising Award, 2007 inaugural, Sexual Abuse Centre, London.

The Matt Cohen A Writer's Life Award for lifetime literary achievement.
