= The Romantic (Gowdy novel) =

2003 novel by Barbara Gowdy

- Author: Barbara Gowdy
- Language: English
- Publication date: 2003

The Romantic (2003) is the sixth novel by Canadian novelist and short story writer Barbara Gowdy. It was longlisted for the Man Booker Prize in the same year.

== Plot summary ==
Louise Kirk learns about love and loss at an early age. When she is nine years old, her former beauty queen mother disappears, leaving a note that reads only - and incorrectly - "Louise knows how to work the washing machine." Soon after, the Richters and their adopted son, Abel, move in across the street. Louise's immediate devotion to the exotic, motherly Mrs. Richter is quickly transferred to her nature-loving, precociously intelligent son." From this childhood friendship evolves a love that will bind Louise and Abel for the rest of their lives. Though Abel moves away, Louise's attachment becomes ever more fixed as she grows up. Separations are followed by reunions, but with every turn of their fractured relationship, Louise discovers that she cannot get Abel to love her as fiercely and exclusively as she loves him. Only when Louise comes face to face with another great loss is she finally forced to confront the costs of abandoning herself to another.
