= Ring (Alexis novel) =

2021 novel by André Alexis

- Author: André Alexis
- Language: English
- Series: Quincunx Cycle
- Publisher: Coach House Books
- Publication date: 2021
- Publication place: Canada
- ISBN: 978-1-55245-430-5

Ring is a Canadian novel by author André Alexis. The novel was published in 2021 by Coach House Books. Though chronologically published last, Alexis considers Ring the third novel in his Quincunx Cycle series, a series of 5 loosely-linked novels which examine the themes of faith, place, love, power and hatred.

Set in Toronto, the novel follows Gwen, a young woman from Bright's Grove who falls in love for the first time. The novel contains many characters featured in previous novels in the Quincunx Cycle. The poet Roo Borson is featured as a character in the novel and also edited the titular poem Ring, that appears in the novel.

== Plot summary ==
In 2019, Gwenhwyfar "Gwen" Lloyd, a transplant from Sarnia to Toronto meets two men at a party, the handsome and charismatic, Olivier, and his friend, Tancred Palmieri, whom she initially dislikes. Gwen begins to casually date Olivier which leads to further encounters with Tancred. Over the course of their encounters Gwen begins to fall in love with Tancred, who maintains his distance from her as he believes she and Olivier are more seriously involved then they are.

During a visit to her hometown, Gwen's mother intuits that Gwen is in love and presents her with a box containing several volumes and a ring. Gwen's mother informs Gwen that the ring is passed down matrilineally and allows the wearer to make three wishes that change her beloved before they marry. After the wishes are completed the ring bearer must return the ring to the box and make a sacrifice. If not the ring will choose to take something from the wearer.

Unsure if she believes in the ring's power or not Gwen wishes that her future husband will recite the unreadable inscription inside the ring whenever he hears the name Polyphemus. Attending a dinner with Tancred, he hears the word Polyphemus and immediately recites the inscription causing Gwen to finally believe in the ring. She and Tancred later confess that they love each other and Tancred reveals that from the moment he saw Gwen he believed she would be his future wife.

In order to fulfil the element of sacrifice Gwen shuts the door of a car trunk on her finger and at the hospital asks for it to be amputated rather than reset. This does nothing to impede her courtship with Tancred.

As Gwen becomes more committed to her time with Tancred she realizes her time with the ring is coming to an end. Not finding much to change about Tancred and not wishing to create devastating consequences in her own life as an unintended result she makes her final two wishes.

Gwen asks Tancred if he wants to marry her and he confesses he feels ambivalent about the institution of marriage. Gwen places the ring back in the box and continues happily on with her relationship with Tancred.

== Critical reception ==
Canadian Notes & Queries praised Alexis for "the inexorable logic of the miraculous" which informed each novel in the Quincunx series.
