= Pastoral (Alexis novel) =

2014 novel by André Alexis

- First edition cover
- Author: André Alexis
- Audio read by: André Alexis
- Language: English
- Series: The Quincunx Cycle
- Release number: 1
- Set in: Barrow, Ontario
- Publisher: Coach House Books
- Publication date: February 28, 2014 (eBook); March 15, 2014 (Paperback)
- Publication place: Canada
- Media type: Print (Paperback) and eBook
- Pages: 168
- ISBN: 978-1552452868 (Paperback); 978-1770563711 (eBook)
- OCLC: 864775056
- Followed by: Fifteen Dogs

Pastoral is a Canadian novel written by André Alexis. The novel was published in 2014 by Coach House Books. It is the first in a five novel Quincunx Cycle that Alexis used to examine faith, place, love, power and hatred and deals with the theme of faith.

Alexis wrote the novel in 2009 but was unable to find a publisher for multiple years. He cited his mother and his sister as the reasons why he was encouraged to keep searching for a publisher as both loved the novel.

The book was inspired by Beethoven's Sixth Symphony also known as the Pastoral Symphony.

== Plot ==
An Ottawa born priest, Father Christopher Pennant, is given a parish in Barrow in Lambton County. He accidentally becomes embroiled in the love affairs of two of his younger parishioners. Elizabeth Denny, an orphan, seeks guidance from Pennant when she discovers her fiancé Robbie Myers is having an affair with his teenage sweetheart Jane Richardson. Upon being discovered he affirms that he loves them both equally, something that everyone he speaks to doubts. Upset, Elizabeth goes to Jane and asks her to get Robbie to walk through the town, completely nude, to get a haircut. Elizabeth reasons that if Robbie loves Jane more he will do it but the humiliation of having done so will allow Elizabeth some measure of revenge. Jane is able to persuade Robbie to walk nude and Elizabeth ends their engagement. Feeling exhilarated by what he has done Robbie thinks it is in his best interest to marry Jane, but she tires of him soon after and after a final fight which turns physical she leaves Barrow forever, making her way to Toronto. Robbie then decides that Jane was crazy and he should marry Elizabeth after all. She consents to their re-engagement, but privately tells herself that she will only decide whether to go through with the marriage on the wedding day.

Meanwhile, Lowther Williams, the caretaker of the parish, arranges a series of miracles with his best friend, Heath Lambert for the benefit of father Pennant. Lowther hopes to discover what sort of a man Pennant is and whether he is up to the task of ushering his soul to heaven after he dies, something Lowther believes will happen imminently as all his male relations died at the age of 63 and he is currently 62. Heath and Lowther arrange for Pennant to see a group of moths flying a loop and the mayor walking on water. The sight of mayor Fox walking on water causes Pennant to think he has seen the devil. When the trick behind the illusion is revealed it triggers a crisis of faith. Pennant's crisis remains hidden and Lowther, upon reaching his 63rd birthday does not die and becomes morose because of it. Sometimes later Pennant encounters a third miracle; a talking sheep who tells Pennant that his desire to no longer see the miraculous is troubling. He tells Pennant that in the future if he wishes to see the divine again he should return to a cluster of three trees and chop them down whereupon the three trees will bleed, give honey and water.

== Reception ==
The novel was positively received upon its release. A critic for The Globe and Mail called it "a satisfying one-off and a worthy act of reclamation." The Winnipeg Review called it "a thought-provoking read that examines a trinity of themes: humanity, nature, and the divine." The reviewer for The National Post had similar praise saying "the tone and timbre of the prose and the ontological temperament of the central characters sweeps the imagination".
