= Vine Awards for Canadian Jewish Literature =

Canadian literary award

The Vine Awards for Canadian Jewish Literature is a major Canadian literary award relaunched in 2016 and presented annually by Toronto's Koffler Centre of the Arts. The Awards honour the best Jewish Canadian writing in four categories, each with an annual prize of $10,000: Fiction, Non-Fiction, Young Adult and Children's literature, and History. A fifth $10,000 prize for Poetry is awarded every three years.

The Awards consider submissions from both print and digital sources (including books, e-books, graphic novels, digital storytelling, and a variety of media). Writers must be Canadian or the submission must have significant Canadian content. Writers must be Jewish or the submission must have significant or predominantly Jewish content.

A professional jury of three individuals working in the arts and media oversee the award selection process. The shortlist for the inaugural Vine Awards for Canadian Jewish Literature was announced on September 15, 2016. The winners were announced on September 29, 2016.

== History ==
The original Canadian Jewish Book Awards were founded in 1988 by Adam Fuerstenberg.

In 1994, the Koffler Centre of the Arts took over the Awards management. From 2004 to 2014 – with the support of a donation from Lillian and Norman Glowinsky – the Awards were renamed the Helen and Stan Vine Canadian Jewish Book Awards.

In 2015, the Koffler Centre of the Arts put the Awards on hiatus for one year to reframe the program. The resulting Vine Awards for Canadian Jewish Literature continues Fuerstenberg's original ambition, "bringing increased awareness of the Canadian Jewish canon to the public, as well as supporting and celebrating Canadian books and writers."

The Vine Awards for Canadian Jewish Literature are supported by a donation by the Lillian and Norman Glowinsky Family Foundation.

== List of winners and shortlists of the Vine Awards for Canadian Jewish Literature ==
Year	Winners	Shortlists
2016; Jury: Pierre Anctil, Devyani Saltzman, Laurence Siegel	FICTION: David Bezmozgis, The Betrayers; NON-FICTION: Mark Celinscak, Distance from the Belsen Heap: Allied Forces and the Liberation of a Nazi Concentration Camp; HISTORY: Beverley Chalmers, Birth, Sex and Abuse: Women’s Voices under Nazi Rule; CHILDREN’S/YOUNG ADULT: Emil Sher, Young Man with Camera; POETRY: Daniel Goodwin, Catullus’s Soldiers	FICTION: David Bezmozgis, The Betrayers; Joseph Kertes, The Afterlife of Stars; Sean Michaels, Us Conductors; Mireille Silcoff, Chez L’Arabe; NON-FICTION: Bob Bossin, Davy the Punk; Mark Celinscak, Distance from the Belsen Heap: Allied Forces and the Liberation of a Nazi Concentration Camp; Daniel J. Levitin, The Organized Mind; Dr. Joe Schwarcz, Monkeys, Myths and Molecules; HISTORY: Beverley Chalmers, Birth, Sex and Abuse: Women’s Voices under Nazi Rule; Andrew Cohen, Two Days in June: John F. Kennedy and the 48 Hours that Made History; Maria Noriega Rachwal, From Kitchen to Carnegie Hall: Ethel Stark and the Montreal Women’s Symphony Orchestra; Ira Robinson, A History of Antisemitism in Canada; CHILDREN’S/YOUNG ADULT: Emil Sher, Young Man with Camera; Shelly Sanders, Rachel's Hope; Eva Wiseman, The World Outside; Frieda Wishinsky, illustrations by Willow Dawson, Avis Dolphin; POETRY: Daniel Goodwin, Catullus's Soldiers; Seymour Mayne, Cusp Word Sonnets; Ruth Panofsky, The Collected Poems of Miriam Waddington; Rachel Zolf, Janey's Arcadia
2017; Jury: Bob Bossin, Ami Sands Brodoff, Cary Fagan	FICTION: Peter Behrens, Carry Me; NON-FICTION: Miriam Libicki, Toward a Hot Jew; HISTORY: Matti Friedman, Pumpkinflowers; CHILDREN'S/YOUNG ADULT: Irene N. Watts and Kathryn E. Shoemaker, Seeking Refuge	FICTION: Eric Beck Rubin, School of Velocity; Peter Behrens, Carry Me; Danila Botha, For All the Men (and Some of the Women) I’ve Known; NON-FICTION: Sarah Barmak, Closer: Notes from the Orgasmic Frontier of Female Sexuality; Judy Battalion, White Walls; David Leach, Chasing Utopia; Miriam Libicki, Toward a Hot Jew; HISTORY: Max Eisen, By Chance Alone; Matti Friedman, Pumpkinflowers; Ester Reiter, A Future Without Hate or Need: The Promise of the Jewish Left in Canada; CHILDREN’S/YOUNG ADULT: Deborah Kerbel, Feathered; Tilar Mazzeo and Mary Farrell, Irena’s Children; Irene N. Watts and Kathryn E. Shoemaker, Seeking Refuge
2018; Jury: Beverley Chalmers, Joseph Kertes, Lee Maracle	FICTION: Laurie Gelman, Class Mom; NON-FICTION: Julija Šukys, Siberian Exile: Blood, War, and a Granddaughter’s Reckoning; HISTORY: Hugues Théorêt, The Blue Shirts: Adrien Arcand and Fascist Anti-Semitism in Canada; CHILDREN’S/YOUNG ADULT: Deborah Katz, Rare is Everywhere	FICTION: Bonnie Burstow, The Other Mrs. Smith; Laurie Gelman, Class Mom; Rebecca Rosenblum, So Much Love; NON-FICTION: Molly Applebaum, Buried Words: The Diary of Molly Applebaum Sarah Barmak; Elaine Dewar, The Handover; Julija Šukys, Siberian Exile: Blood, War, and a Granddaughter’s Reckoning; HISTORY: Roger Frie, Not in My Family: Germany Memory and Responsibility After the Holocaust; Hugues Théorêt, The Blue Shirts: Adrien Arcand and Fascist Anti-Semitism in Canada; Max Wallace, In the Name of Humanity: The Secret Deal to End the Holocaust; CHILDREN’S/YOUNG ADULT: Melanie Fishbane, Maud; Kathy Kacer, To Look a Nazi in the Eye: A Teen’s Account of a War Criminal Trial; Deborah Katz, Rare is Everywhere
2019; Jury: Ayesha Chatterjee, Melanie J. Fishbane, Eric Beck Rubin	FICTION: Claire Holden Rothman, Lear's Shadow; NON-FICTION: Anne Michaels, Infinite Gradation; POETRY: Linda Frank, Divided; HISTORY: Benjamin Carter Hett, The Death of Democracy; CHILDREN'S/YOUNG ADULT: Jonathan Auxier, Sweep	FICTION: Claire Holden Rothman, Lear's Shadow; Aaron Kreuter, You and Me, Belonging; Natalie Morrill, The Ghost Keeper; NON-FICTION: Anne Michaels, Infinite Gradation; Lezli Rubin-Kunda, At Home: Talks with Canadian Artists about Place and Practice; Sarah Weinman, The Real Lolita; POETRY: Linda Frank, Divided; Anne Michaels, All We Saw; Suzannah Showler, Thing Is; HISTORY: Benjamin Carter Hett, The Death of Democracy; Robert Harris, Song of a Nation: The Untold Story of Canada’s National Anthem; Sarah Wobick-Segev, Homes Away from Home: Jewish Belonging in Twentieth Century Paris, Berlin and St. Petersburg; CHILDREN’S/YOUNG ADULT: Jonathan Auxier, Sweep; Cary Fagan, Wolfie and Fly: Band on the Run; Ellen Schwartz, Princess Dolls
2020; Jury: Judy Battalion, Allan Levine, Shani Mootoo	FICTION: Sarah Leavitt, Agnes, Murderess; HISTORY: Matti Friedman, Spies of No Country; NON-FICTION: Naomi K. Lewis, Tiny Lights for Travellers; YOUNG ADULT/CHILDREN'S LITERATURE: Eric Walters and Kathy Kacer, Broken Strings	FICTION: David Bezmozgis, Immigrant City; Sarah Leavitt, Agnes, Murderess; David Szalay, Turbulence; HISTORY: Zelda Abramson & John Lynch, The Montreal Shtetl: Making Home After the Holocaust; Matti Friedman, Spies of No Country; Heidi J.S. Tworek, News from Germany: The Competition to Control World Communications, 1900–1945; NON-FICTION: Naomi K. Lewis, Tiny Lights for Travellers; Ayelet Tsabari, The Art of Leaving; Diana Wichtel, Driving to Treblinka; YOUNG ADULT/CHILDREN'S LITERATURE: Kathy Kacer, Masters of Silence; Edeet Ravel, A Boy is Not a Bird; Eric Walters and Kathy Kacer, Broken Strings
2021; Jury: Zelda Abramson, Nathan Adler, Naomi K. Lewis	FICTION: Sidura Ludwig, You Are Not What We Expected; HISTORY: Sharon Kirsch, The Smallest Objective; NON-FICTION: Myriam Steinberg, illustrations by Christache, Catalogue Baby: A Memoir of (In)fertility; YOUNG ADULT/CHILDREN'S LITERATURE: Gordon Korman, War Stories	FICTION: Sidura Ludwig, You Are Not What We Expected; Nessa Rapoport, Evening; Carol Windley, Midnight Train to Prague; HISTORY: Sharon Kirsch, The Smallest Objective; Paul Roberts Bentley, Strange Journey: John R. Friedeberg Seeley and the Quest for Mental Health; Celia Rabinovitch, Duchamp’s Pipe: A Chess Romance--Marcel Duchamp and George Koltanowski; NON-FICTION: Rick Salutin and Gideon Salutin, illustrated by Dušan Petričić, Gideon’s Bible: A Father and Son Discuss God, the Bible, and Life; Myriam Steinberg, illustrations by Christache, Catalogue Baby: A Memoir of (In)fertility; Rachel Matlow, Dead Mom Walking; YOUNG ADULT/CHILDREN'S LITERATURE: Michelle Barker, My Long List of Impossible Things; Gordon Korman, War Stories; Helaine Becker, illustrated by Kari Rust, Emmy Noether: The Most Important Mathematician You’ve Never Heard Of
2023 Jury: Sidura Ludwig, Syd Zolf, Alain Goldschläger	FICTION: Sheila Heti, Pure Colour; NON-FICTION: Gabor Maté, The Myth of Normal; HISTORY: Jeffrey Veidinger, In the Midst of Civilized Europe: The Pogroms of 1918-1921 and the Onset of the Holocaust; POETRY: Adam Sol, Broken Dawn Blessings; YOUNG ADULT/CHILDREN'S LITERATURE: Cary Fagan, Water, Water	FICTION: Rivka Galchen, Everyone Knows Your Mother Is a Witch; Gary Barwin, Nothing the Same, Everything Haunted: The Ballad of Motl the Cowboy; Sheila Heti, Pure Colour; NON-FICTION: Mark Braude, Kiki Man Ray; Anais Granofsky, The Girl in the Middle; Gabor Maté, The Myth of Normal; HISTORY: Judy Battalion, The Light of Days: The Untold Story of Women Resistance Fighters in Hitler's Ghettos; Mark Celinscak, Kingdom of Night: Witnesses to the Holocaust; Jeffrey Veidinger, In the Midst of Civilized Europe: The Pogroms of 1918-1921 and the Onset of the Holocaust; POETRY: Leah Horlick, Moldovan Hotel; Aaron Kreuter, Shifting Baseline Syndrome; Adam Sol, Broken Dawn Blessings; YOUNG ADULT/CHILDREN'S LITERATURE: Cary Fagan, Water, Water; Charlotte Schallié, But I Live: Three Stories of Child Survivors of the Holocaust; Erin Silver, Sitting Shiva

== See also ==
- Canadian Jewish Book Award
- List of winners of the National Jewish Book Award
- National Jewish Book Award
