= Lynn Crosbie =

Canadian poet and novelist (born 1963)

- Born: August 7, 1963 (age 63); Montreal, Quebec, Canada
- Occupations: Poet, author, educator
- Writing career
- Language: English
- Genres: Poetry, fiction

Lynn Crosbie (born 7 August 1963) is a Canadian poet and novelist. She teaches at the University of Toronto.

== Life and career ==
Crosbie was born in Montreal, Quebec, and now lives in Toronto, Ontario.

She received her PhD in English from the University of Toronto, writing her PhD thesis on the work of the American poet Anne Sexton.

She has taught at York University, University of Toronto, University of Guelph, and OCAD University, and has taught shorter classes/workshops at Rutgers University, Workman, Sistering, Flying Books and more.

In 1997, Insomniac Press published her controversial book on the Canadian criminal Paul Bernardo, Paul's Case.

In 2006, Crosbie published a book-length poem titled Liar, available through House of Anansi Press. Liar is a personal work that deals with the end of her seven-year relationship with the professional wrestling fan Michael Holmes, author of the poetry book Parts Unknown. Her long relationship with the writer Tony Burgess is chronicled in Pearl (1996).

Crosbie is a cultural critic, and the author of several books of poetry including Miss Pamela's Mercy, Corpses of the Future, and Missing Children.

Crosbie has lectured on and written about visual art at the AGO, the Power Plant, the McMichael Gallery, the Oakville Gallery, and OCAD University (where she taught for six years.) She is a journalist with who has a regular column titled "Pop Rocks" in the Toronto newspaper The Globe and Mail and was a regular contributor to Toronto Life Fashion.

Her Trampoline Hall Lecture was entitled "Don't Have Casual Sex".

Her book Life Is About Losing Everything, a roman à clef/fictional memoir, was released in April 2012 by House of Anansi. The book won the 2013 ReLit Award in the fiction category.

Her novel Where Did You Sleep Last Night was published in 2015 from House of Anansi. It was shortlisted for Ontario's Trillium Book Award.

Her 2018 novel Chicken was optioned by filmmaker Bruce McDonald.

== Bibliography ==
- Miss Pamela's Mercy (Coach House, 1992)
- The Girl Wants To: Women's Representations of Sex and the Body (Coach House, 1993) (as editor)
- Villainelle (Coach House, 1994)
- Pearl (House of Anansi, 1995)
- Paul's Case (Insomniac Press, 1997)
- Click: Becoming Feminists (MacFarlane, Walter & Ross, 1997) (as editor)
- Queen Rat: New and Selected Poems (House of Anansi, 1998)
- Dorothy L'Amour (HarperCollins, 1999)
- Phoebe 2002: An Essay in Verse (Turtle Point, 2003) (with Jeffery Conway and David Trinidad)
- Missing Children (McClelland & Stewart, 2003)
- Liar (House of Anansi, 2006)
- Life Is About Losing Everything (House of Anansi, 2012)
- Where Did You Sleep Last Night? (2015)
- Chicken (House of Anansi, 2018)

== See also ==
- Canadian literature
- Canadian poetry
- List of Canadian poets
