= Misha Glouberman =

Canadian author, consultant

Misha Glouberman is an author, improviser, speaker, and consultant.

== Book ==
Glouberman co-wrote The Chairs are Where the People Go: How to Live, Work, and Play in the City with Sheila Heti, a collection of seventy-two short pieces which The New Yorker described as "a triumph of what might be called conversational philosophy," while The New York Times described it as "pop philosophy." The book was created by Glouberman talking aloud, and Heti transcribing as he talked. It was published by Farrar, Straus and Giroux in 2011, and covers topics including "[h]ow to arrange chairs at a reading in ways that involve your audience, how to organize a neighborhood to petition to get a noisy bar to quiet down in the wee hours, how to play charades, [and] how to appreciate the beauty of miscommunication."

== Improv ==
Glouberman is a founder and alumnus of the Harvard College-based improv group, The Immediate Gratification Players. He continues to teach improv classes on topics including How to be Really Good at Playing Charades and Terrible Noises for Beautiful People, a mass sound-improv classes for both musicians and non-musicians. These games have been performed as workshops and also in art contexts, at institutions and galleries such as Southern Exposure. Some of the improv games Glouberman created are described in The Chairs are Where the People Go. Heti describes Glouberman's work as "less about entertaining an audience than about getting the audience to interact with each other and have some experience together." Glouberman has said that he is "much more interested in improvisation as a practice, or as something to do, than as something for people to watch."

Also with Sheila Heti, he co-founded the monthly barroom lecture series Trampoline Hall, which he continues to host in Toronto and other cities. At each event, he offers the audience highly specific and humorous instructions for how to conduct the post-lecture Q&A.

== Consulting ==
Glouberman works as a consultant, helping companies design conferences, with an emphasis on collaboration and interaction. He has also taught classes in negotiation and communication skills.

== Personal life ==
Glouberman holds a degree in Philosophy from Harvard. His former partner is Canadian artist Margaux Williamson.
