= Musta'arabim =

Musta'arabim (from Arabic: مستعرب, romanized: musta'rib, lit. 'Arabicized') may refer to:

- Musta'arabi Jews, the Jews of the Arab world who were culturally and linguistically Arabized
- Mozarabs, Christian Spaniards in Arab Muslim-ruled Spain who were culturally and linguistically Arabized
- Mista'aravim, an Israeli undercover counter-terrorism unit
