= Immediate Gratification Players =

Harvard improv comedy troupe

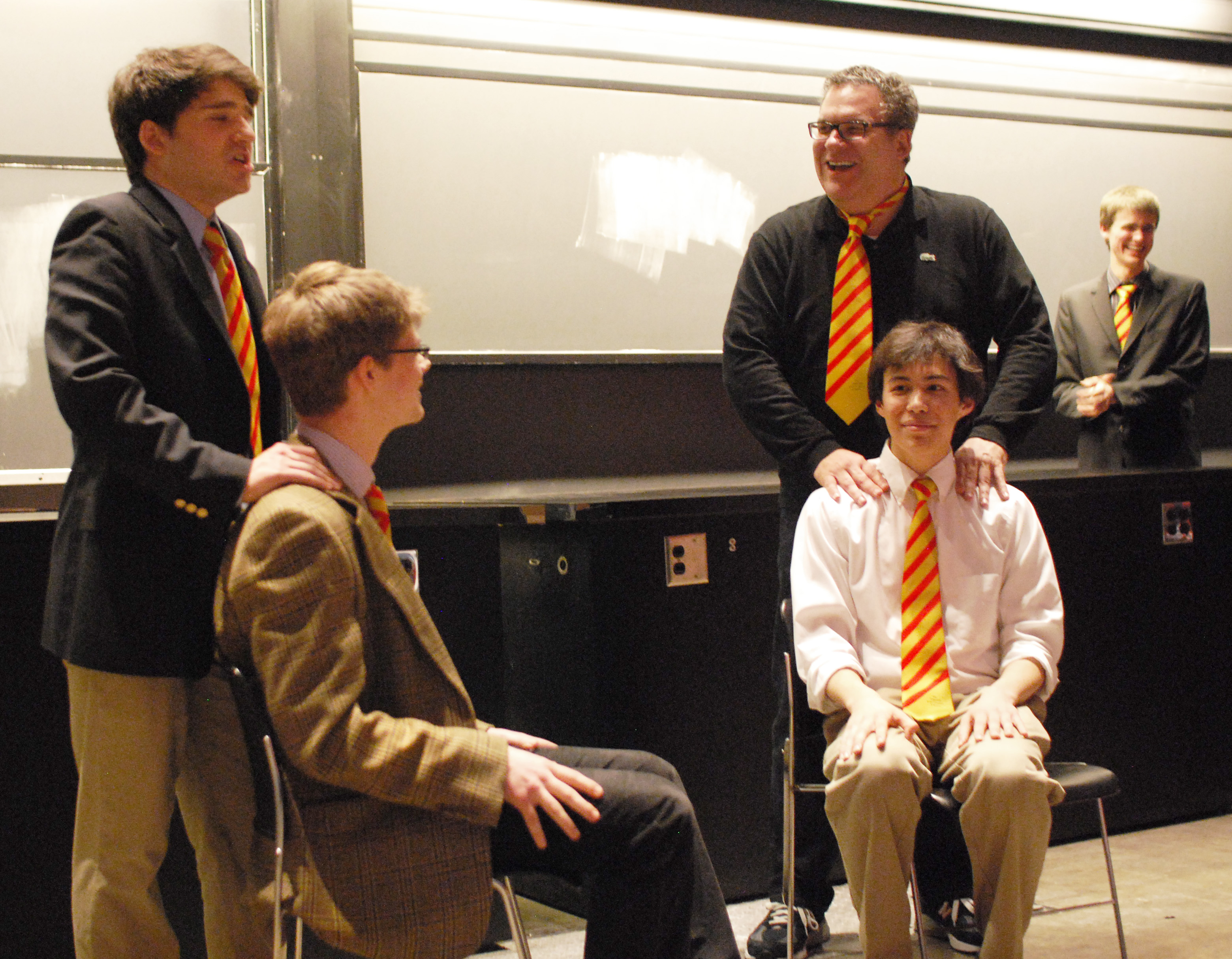
The Immediate Gratification Players performing with comedian Jeff Garlin. Their distinctive red and yellow ties are featured.

The Immediate Gratification Players (IGP) are a collegiate improvisational comedy troupe based out of Harvard College. They specialize in long form, free-form improvisation and are recognized as one of the top college troupes in the nation.

== History ==
The Immediate Gratification Players were founded by Harvard freshmen in the fall of 1986. Inspired by the Keith Johnstone book Impro, the founding group performed traditional improv and long-form theme-based shows. Known on campus as IGP, they did not charge for admission to their on-campus shows. Their red-and-yellow striped ties that are one of the troupe's hallmarks were added by subsequent members of the IGP.

Each year, the Immediate Gratification Players host the Laugh Riot improvisational comedy festival at the American Repertory Theater. The invitational festival, begun in the spring of 1999, includes troupes from other colleges, including Cornell University, Wesleyan University, Yale University, Columbia University, Northeastern University, Brown University, The Ohio State University, and many others. On the weekend of the annual Harvard-Yale football game, the Immediate Gratification Players either host or travel to a show which also stars an improvisational comedy troupe from Yale such as the Exit Players. Along with on-campus shows, they also play at Boston's Improv Asylum and at comedy clubs in New York City. Beyond the northeast, the Immediate Gratification Players have played in Florida, Los Angeles, Texas, Chicago, San Francisco, and London.

Apart from a traditional long form, the Immediate Gratification Players annually perform shows in specialty forms such as the “dinner party” and “radio show” formats. In 2007, they were selected out of the numerous Boston-based improv troupes to star in several comedy sketches produced by the Boston Globe in its Peter Post etiquette section. In 2010, they were selected to roast Wyclef Jean when he was named Artist of the Year by the Harvard Foundation. Shakira was honored in 2011 as the Harvard Foundation Artist of the Year, and again the Immediate Gratification Players were asked to roast her. The Immediate Gratification Players continued working with the Harvard Foundation, roasting John Legend in 2012 when he was named Artist of the Year The following year in 2013, they roasted Nicole Scherzinger, also a recipient of the Artist of the Year award. In 2014, the Harvard Foundation honored LL Cool J as Artist of the Year, and once again, IGP got a chance to participate in the celebrity roast. In 2015, IGP participated in the roast of Eva Longoria, recipient of the Harvard Foundation Artist of the Year award.

In 2025, the Immediate Gratification Players placed third in an international improv competition hosted at the Montreal Improv Theatre.

== Immediate Gratification Player of the Year ==
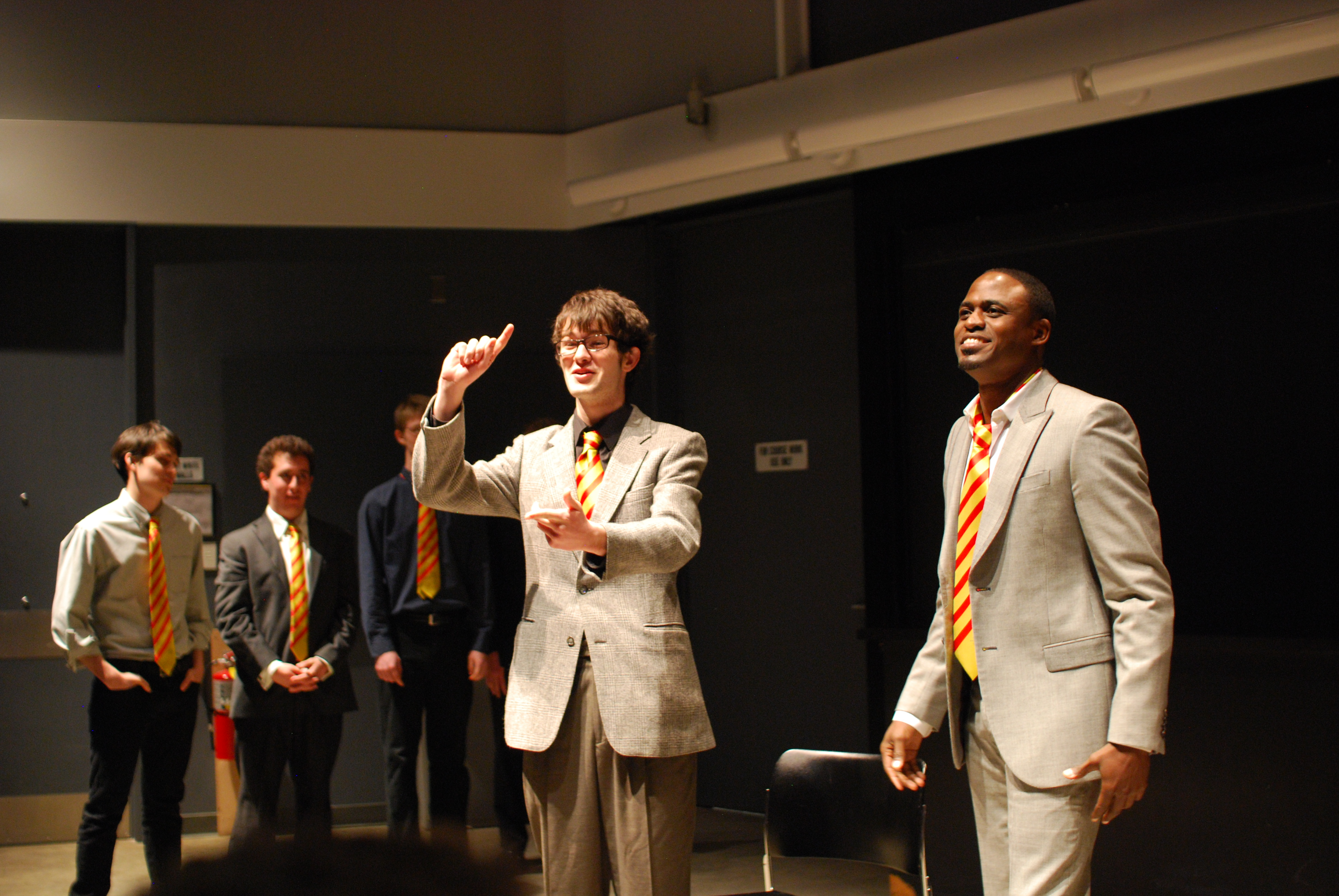
Comedian Wayne Brady performing in the show honoring his Immediate Gratification Player of the Year award.

In 2010, the Immediate Gratification Players began honoring great comedians with a background in improvisational comedy as their Immediate Gratification Player of the Year. The award is not strictly annual, with the troupe's leader remarking that the group is "hoping to give this award as much as possible, devaluing it to the point where it basically means nothing." The award recipient performs the monologue portion of an Armando form show, where several scenes are based on the themes brought up in the monologue, which itself is formed from a crowd suggestion. Upon completion of the show, the honoree receives their own red-and-yellow striped tie.

The inaugural award recipient was comedian Jeff Garlin of Curb Your Enthusiasm and WALL-E fame. Garlin later wore his necktie on an episode of Curb Your Enthusiasm.

In 2011, Wayne Brady of ABC's Whose Line Is It Anyway was named the second Immediate Gratification Player of the Year.

The Player of the Year ceremony was paused from 2020 through 2022 due to the COVID-19 global pandemic and resumed in 2023. The Player of the Year ceremony was paused again from 2024 to 2025, maybe because of the COVID-19 global pandemic.

| Name | Year |
|---|---|
| Jeff Garlin | 2010 |
| Wayne Brady | 2011 |
| Jason Alexander | 2013 |
| Keegan-Michael Key | 2014 (ceremony in 2015) |
| Nick Offerman | 2016 (ceremony in 2015) |
| Colin Mochrie | 2017 |
| Rachel Bloom | 2019 |
| Angela Kinsey | 2023 |
| Jason Mantzoukas | 2024 |

== First book ==
In December 2010, the troupe released its first published book, an improv how-to guide aimed at students, entitled “So You Think You’re Funny: A Students’ Guide to Improv Comedy.” The book was published by Meriwether Publishing, which is known for other comedy publications such as "Truth in Comedy" by Del Close.

== Notable alumni ==
| Name | Class year | Notability | Reference(s) |
|---|---|---|---|
| Karen Chee | 2017 | Late Night with Seth Meyers writer | |
| Farai Chideya | 1990 | Journalist, former host of NPR's News and Notes | |
| Nate Dern | 2007 | Author of Not Quite a Genius, Senior Writer at Funny or Die, Artistic Director at Upright Citizens Brigade Theatre New York, Comedian, Reality Show contestant, season 3 of Beauty and the Geek | |
| Misha Glouberman | 1990 | Founder of the Immediate Gratification Players, host of Canadian barroom lecture series Trampoline Hall, and noted charades enthusiast | |
| Sarah Haskins | 2001 | Trophy Wife co-creator, Current TV's Target Women | |
| Todd Kim | 1994 | First Solicitor General of Washington, D.C., First contestant on Who Wants to Be a Millionaire? | |
| Justin Krebs | 2000 | Creator of Drinking Liberally | |
| David Modigliani | 2002 | Director and Producer; Crawford (film) and Trust Us, This Is All Made Up | |
| Nicholas Stoller | 1998 | Director and Producer; Forgetting Sarah Marshall, Get Him to the Greek, Fun with Dick and Jane, and Storks | |
| Tom Hale | 1990 | CEO of Oura Ring | |

== See also ==
- Improvisational theatre
- List of improvisational theatre companies
- List of improvisational theater festivals
