= Pumpkinflowers =

2016 book by journalist Matti Friedman

Pumpkinflowers: A Soldier's Story
- First edition
- Author: Matti Friedman
- Language: English
- Publisher: Algonquin
- Publication date: 2016
- Media type: Print (Hardcover, Paperback)
- ISBN: 978-0-7710-3690-3 (Hardcover, McClelland & Stewart)

Pumpkinflowers: A Soldier's Story, is a 2016 book by journalist Matti Friedman, published by Algonquin. The book's title is a reference to Pumpkin Outpost in Lebanon, where the book's events take place, plus "flowers," the Israeli Defense Forces' codeword for casualties.

== Synopsis ==
Friedman describes an attack by the Lebanese Islamist group Hezbollah on the small Israeli army unit, Outpost Pumpkin, in the South Lebanon security zone on October 29, 1994. Friedman served at the outpost 3 years after the incident. The attack was brief; Hezbollah fighters killed one Israeli soldier and wounded 2 others before withdrawing. However, the incident was heavily covered in the media because of a short, blurry video with a soundtrack of gunfire and martial music, shot by Hezbollah fighters.

The video appears to show Hezbollah jihadis capturing an Israeli military position and planting a flag to symbolize victory. Hezbollah claimed to have captured the outpost and "purified it of Zionists", and the video ignited debate in Israel over the preparedness of the military and the costs of maintaining the buffer zone in Lebanon. Friedman argues that the video was the first of what would soon become popularly known as "terror selfies" circulated as propaganda claiming Islamist military victory. The incident marked the start of three years of conflict between Israel and Lebanon between the First and Second Lebanon Wars, which Friedman argues marked the rise of tactics of asymmetric warfare, particularly the use of improvised explosive devices, that became characteristic of warfare in the Middle East in the following years.

The book also examines the reaction that the conflicts provoked in Israel, which sparked backlash to the maintenance of troops in the buffer zone along the Lebanese border. Friedman's recounting of this internal debate is followed by his own account of being stationed at the Pumpkin in the following years. Friedman was stationed at the outpost starting in 1998, the year after the period of sporadic conflict with Lebanon ended. He writes about his experiences there and how they became formative to his adult identity. Friedman visited Lebanon as a tourist in 2002. The final section of the book recounts this visit, and the difficulty he had reconciling the friendliness of the people he met with their open antisemitism.
