= Pure Colour =

Novel by Sheila Heti

- 2022 hardcover edition
- Author: Sheila Heti
- Language: English
- Genre: Fiction
- Published: February 15, 2022
- Publisher: Harvill Secker; Farrar, Straus and Giroux; Knopf Canada
- Publication place: Canada
- Media type: Print: Hardcover, Paperback; Digital: Audio Book, Kindle Edition
- Pages: 224
- Award: Governor General’s Literary Award
- ISBN: 9780735282452
- Website: Penguin Random House Canada

Pure Colour is a novel by Canadian author Sheila Heti. Published by Knopf Canada, the book won the 2022 Governor General's Award for English-language fiction.

== Synopsis ==
Pure Colour is a novel about art, love, death, and time from beginning to end. Heti tells the story of a girl named Mira, her relationship with her father and how she deals with his death, and her love for Annie, who she meets while studying to become an art critic.

== Reception ==
Pure Colour was generally well received in Canada and the United States. Dwight Garner, journalist for The New York Times writes, "Just like that, there’s magic," and "Heti owns a sharp axe. In Pure Colour the wood chips that fall are as interesting as the sculpture that gets made." At The New Yorker, American critic Parul Sehgal adds "This book, so full of argument, feels weightless. I note this with wonder. . . Heti's books aim to be vessels for the transformation of reader and writer." In The Globe and Mail, Nicole Thompson from The Canadian Press calls the novel "a strange and meditative book."

== Awards ==
Year	Award	Category	Result	Ref.
2022	Giller Prize	—	Longlisted	
2022	Governor General's Awards	English-language fiction	Won	
2022	Rathbones Folio Prize	—	Shortlisted	
2023	Vine Awards for Canadian Jewish Literature	Fiction	Won	
