= Michael Gelman =

American television producer (born 1961)

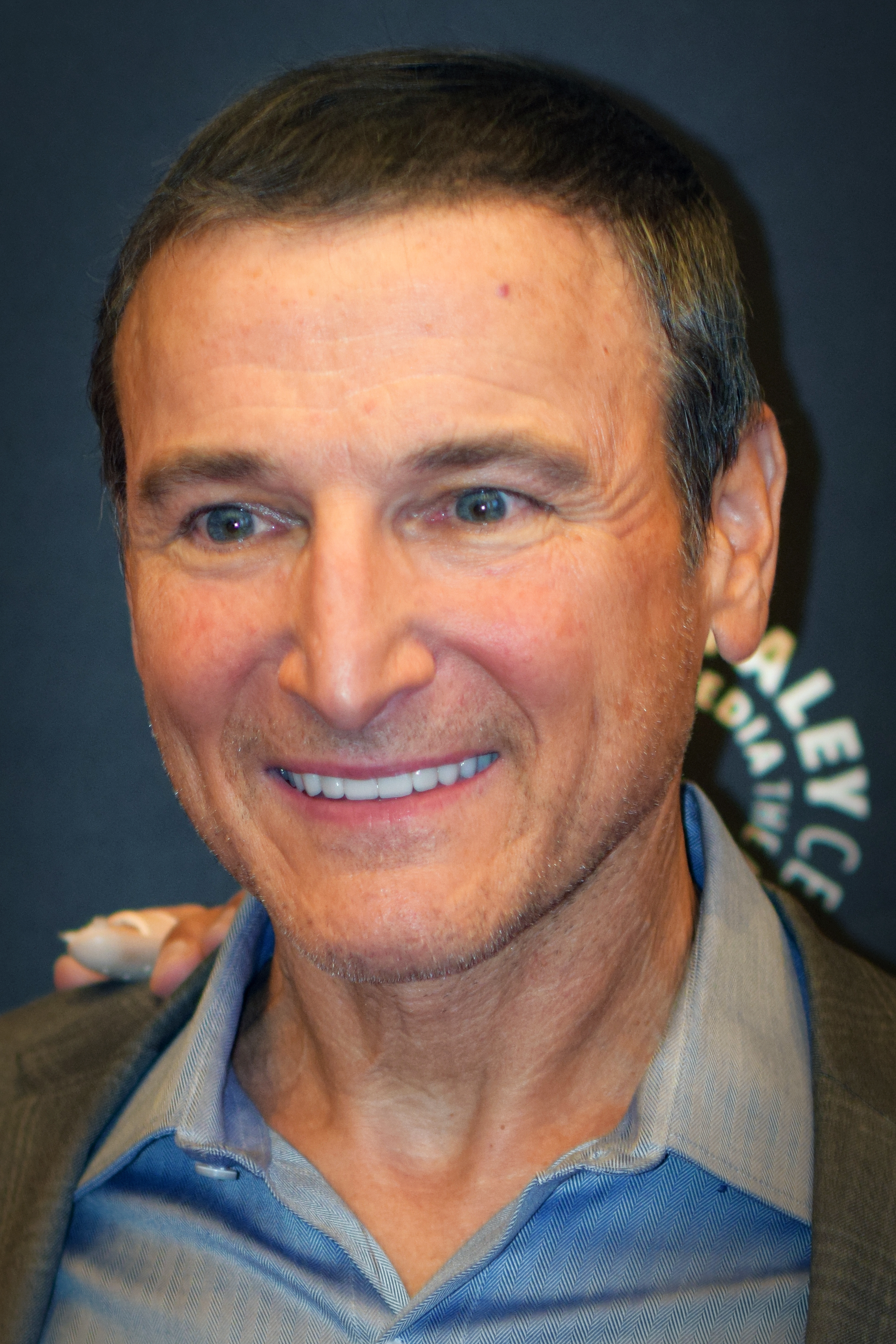
- Gelman in 2023
- Born: Michael Seth Gelman; August 4, 1961 (age 65); New York City, U.S.
- Education: University of Colorado Boulder
- Occupations: Television producer, actor
- Years active: 1987–present
- Spouse: Laurie Gelman (m. 2000)
- Children: 2

Michael Seth Gelman (born August 4, 1961) is an American television producer best known as the executive producer of Live with Kelly and Mark. He also appeared in two episodes of Kelly Ripa's ABC sitcom Hope and Faith.

== Early life and career ==
Gelman was born at Mount Sinai Hospital in East Harlem, Manhattan, New York City to a Jewish family, and lived in Forest Hills, Queens, New Jersey and the Long Island town of Dix Hills through grades 1-6, before moving to the Chicago suburb of Highland Park, Illinois. After high school, he moved to Melville, New York.

While earning a degree in broadcast production management from the University of Colorado Boulder School of Journalism in 1983, Gelman worked for the U.S. Ski Association covering pre-Olympic trials all over the country as a cameraman, field producer and editor. Gelman's most important internship came during the summer of his junior year at WABC-TV in New York, the station that would later produce Live! with Kelly and Mark. In the 1980s he became a production assistant on Regis Philbin's local talk show, The Morning Show. Gelman worked his way up to Executive Producer on The Morning Show which would eventually become Live!.

== Personal life ==
In 2000, he married Laurie Hibberd, a television personality from Canada who also worked in morning television as the co-host of FX's Breakfast Time with Tom Bergeron. They have two daughters and live in Manhattan.
