= Laurie Gelman =

Canadian television personality and writer

- Born: Laurie Hibberd; April 4, 1964 (age 62)
- Spouse: Michael Gelman (m. 2000)
- Children: 2

Laurie Gelman (née Hibberd) (born April 4, 1964) is a Canadian television personality and writer, originally from Ottawa, Ontario. In 2007 she worked on two Canadian-based talk shows, The Mom Show and Doctor in the House.

== Biography ==
Hibberd was raised in Ottawa, Ontario and is a graduate of the Ryerson Polytechnical Institute (now TMU) in Toronto and graduated with a bachelor's degree in journalism. She began her broadcasting career as a traffic reporter at CKFM Radio in Toronto from 1987 to 1988. In the late 1980s and early 1990s, she served as a host on YTV for YTV Rocks and Rock'n'Talk. She later became an entertainment reporter for WSVN-TV in Miami from 1992 to 1994. From 1994 to 1996, she joined Tom Bergeron to co-host the morning show ''Breakfast Time'' on FX. She also appeared on Good Morning America, Good Morning America Sunday and the CBS Early Show.

She published the humor novel Class Mom in 2017. The book was a shortlisted finalist for the 2018 Stephen Leacock Memorial Medal for Humour, and won the Vine Award for Canadian Jewish Literature. It was followed by the sequels You've Been Volunteered (2019) and Yoga Pant Nation (2021).

Her novel Smells Like Tween Spirit was published in 2022.

== Personal life ==
She is married to television producer Michael Gelman; they have two children.
