= Sidura Ludwig =

Canadian writer

Sidura Ludwig is a Canadian writer, whose short story collection You Are Not What We Expected was a shortlisted finalist for the Danuta Gleed Literary Award in 2021, and won the Vine Award for Canadian Jewish Literature that same year.

Sidura Ludwig was born and raised to a Jewish family in Winnipeg, Manitoba, to Israel and Maylene Ludwig. She graduated Grant Park High School in River Heights, and studied English and creative writing at York University in Toronto. Ludwig has a Master's degree in Journalism from Carleton University in Ottawa. She published her first novel Holding My Breath in 2007. She currently lives in Thornhill, Ontario with her husband Jason Shron and her three kids, Boaz, Dalya and Isaac.
