= Adam Sol =

Canadian-American poet

- Born: New York City, U.S.
- Education: Tufts University; Indiana University Bloomington (MFA); University of Cincinnati (PhD)
- Occupation: Poet
- Spouse: Rabbi Yael Splansky
- Children: 3

Adam Sol is a Canadian-American poet.

== Life ==
Adam Sol was born in 1969 in New York and raised in New Fairfield, Connecticut. He graduated from Tufts University, from Indiana University Bloomington with an M.F.A, and from the University of Cincinnati with a Ph.D. He lives in Toronto with his wife, Rabbi Yael Splansky.

== Work ==
Sol's first book, Jonah's Promise, won the First Series Book Award from MidList Press and was published in 2000. His second collection, Crowd of Sounds, was published by House of Anansi Press and won the Trillium Award for Poetry in 2004. His third collection, Jeremiah Ohio, was published by House of Anansi Press in 2008. His fourth, Complicity, was published by McClelland & Stewart in 2014.

Sol's poetry blog "How a Poem Moves" became the How a Poem Moves a book in 2019, recommended by the CBC.

Sol's most recent book, Broken Dawn Blessings, was the 2022 winner of the Canadian Jewish Literary Award for Poetry.

Sol currently holds the Blake C. Goldring Chair at the University of Toronto's Victoria College.

== Awards ==
- 2004 Trillium Book Award for Poetry
- 2008 Trillium Book Award for Poetry, Shortlist
- 2022 Canadian Jewish Literary Award for Poetry
- 2023 Vine Awards for Canadian Jewish Literature for Poetry

== Works ==
=== Poetry ===
- Jonah's promise: poems. Mid-List Press. 2000. ISBN 978-0-922811-47-2.
- Crowd of Sounds. House of Anansi Press. 2003. ISBN 978-0-88784-688-5.
- Jeremiah, Ohio. House of Anansi Press. 2008. ISBN 978-0-88784-791-2.
- Complicity. McClelland & Stewart. 2014. ISBN 978077107927-6.
- Broken Dawn Blessings: Poems. ECW Press. 2021. ISBN 978177041606-2.

=== Non-fiction ===
- How a Poem Moves: A Field Guide for Readers of Poetry. ECW Press. 2019. ISBN 9781770414563.
- Balancing acts: the re-invention of ethnicity in Jewish American fiction before 1930. University of Cincinnati. 2000.
