= Miriam Libicki =

American-Israeli graphic novelist

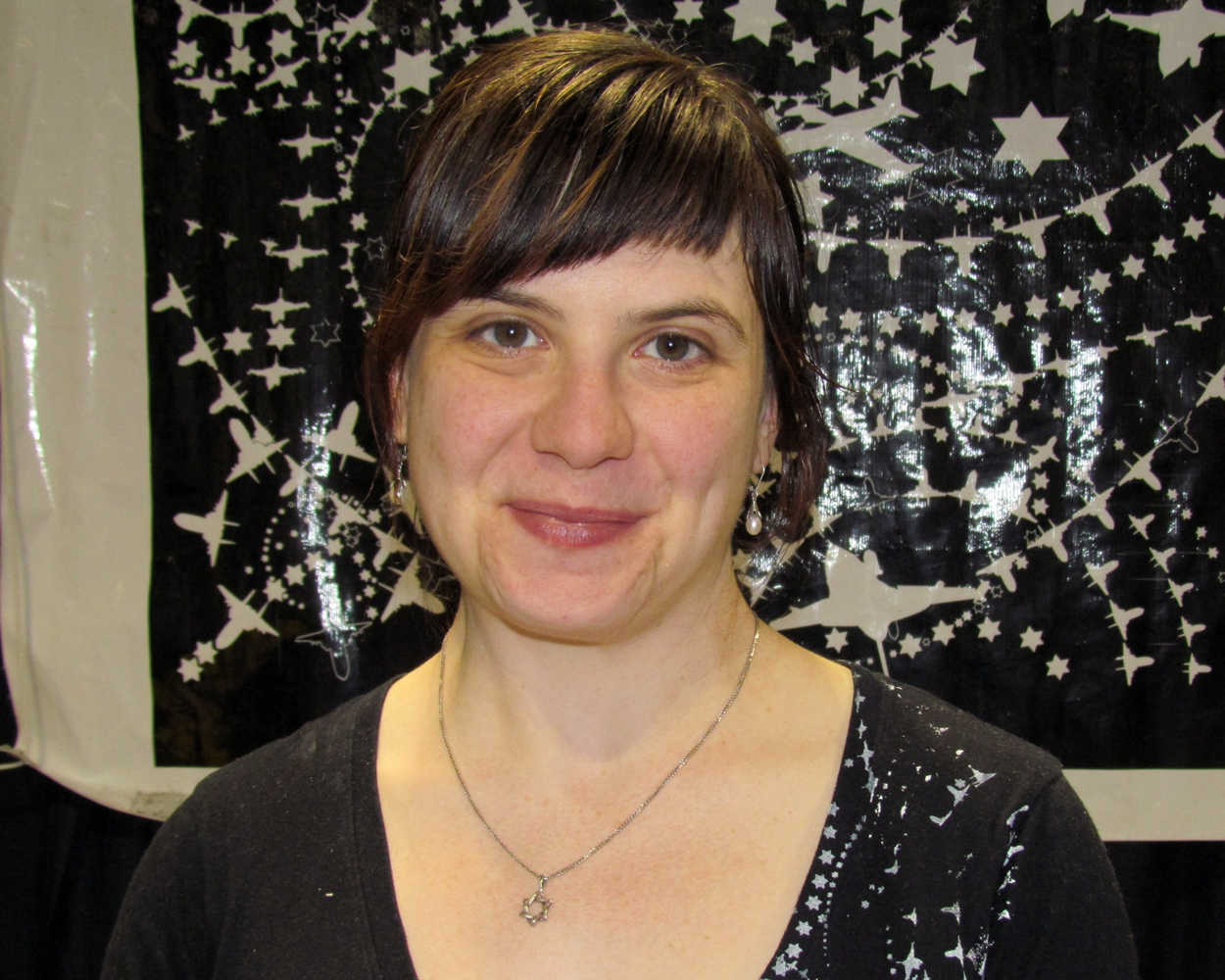
- Born: Columbus, Ohio, U.S.
- Areas: Cartoonist, Writer, Artist
- Notable works: Toward a Hot Jew; But I Live: Three Stories of Child Survivors of the Holocaust

Miriam Libicki (Hebrew: מרים ליביצקי) is an American-Israeli graphic novelist based in Vancouver, Canada. Her work often centers on the intersection of being Jewish and American. Her past service in the Israel Defense Forces has provided both the basis of some of her work and the source of controversy in her career.

== Early years ==
Libicki was born in Columbus, Ohio and raised as an Orthodox Jew. She received a Bachelor of Fine Arts from Emily Carr University of Art and Design and a Master of Fine Arts from the University of British Columbia.

Libicki voluntarily served as a clerk in the Israel Defense Forces (IDF) in 2000, during the time of the Second Intifada.

== Career ==
Libicki began creating comics due to a school assignment. Working to transcribe an entry in her army service diary showed her that comics were a good way to document her military career. In 2008, she self-published her first graphic novel, jobnik!, collecting a "pretty close to autobiographical" work she had serialized in self-published issues.

In 2017, Libicki was named Writer In Residence at the Vancouver Public Library, becoming the first graphic novelist named to that position.

In 2020, she drew a story to a University of Victoria effort to document the lives of Holocaust survivors in graphic novel form, having been located for the gig via a Google search. The book saw print in 2022 as But I Live.

In addition to her career as an illustrator, Libicki teaches cartooning and illustration at Emily Carr University of Art and Design.

In 2024, the Vancouver Comics Arts Festival denounced Libicki and apologized for accepting her as an exhibitor in 2024 and 2022. The organization announced that she was barred due to "public safety concerns" arising from her having served in the IDF and the impact that would have on "those who are directly affected by the ongoing genocide in Palestine and Indigenous community members alike." Libicki received support from local authors, international creators, and indigenous artists, as well as Palestinian American author Marguerite Dabaie. Libicki issued the statement, "I believe all policing of artists' personal identities and nationalities is wrong" and noted her support for Palestinian statehood, following which the festival deleted their denunciation. The festival issued a formal apology to Libicki declaring those involved in her banning resigned from the festival or were in the process of leaving with the transition to a new management team. Libicki used the attention generated by this controversy to sell prints raising money for The Mothers' Call, a collaborative effort between Palestinian peace group Women of the Sun and Israeli peace group Women Wage Peace.

== Awards and honors ==
In 2016, Forbes named Toward a Hot Jew one of the top ten graphic novels of the year.

She has also received the following accolades:

- 2017 Vine Award for Canadian Jewish Literature: Non-Fiction for Toward a Hot Jew
- 2020 Eisner Award nominee for best short story for "Who Gets Called An 'Unfit' Mother"
- 2022 Inkpot Award
- 2023 Kahn Family Foundation Prize for Holocaust Writing for But I Live

== Personal life ==
Libicki is married to Mike Yoshioka, a Japanese-Buddhist-Canadian. She had two children as of 2017.

== Publications ==
- Libicki, Miriam (2008). Jobnik!: An American Girl's Adventures in the Israeli Army. Real Gone Girl Studios. ISBN 978-0-97-842770-2.
- Libicki, Miriam (2016). Toward A Hot Jew: Graphic Essays. Fantagraphics. ISBN 978-1-60-699981-3.
- Libicki, Miriam (2019). Who Gets Called an "Unfit" Mother?. The Nib.
- Libicki, Miriam (2021). How the Soviet Jews Changed the World: A Graphic Tale of Tragedy and Triumph. The Conversationalist.
- Schallié, Charlotte, ed. (2022). But I Live: Three Stories of Child Survivors of the Holocaust. Illustrated by Barbara Yelin, Gilad Seliktar, and Miriam Libicki. New Jewish Press. ISBN 978-1-48-752684-9.
