= Jonathan Auxier =

Canadian writer

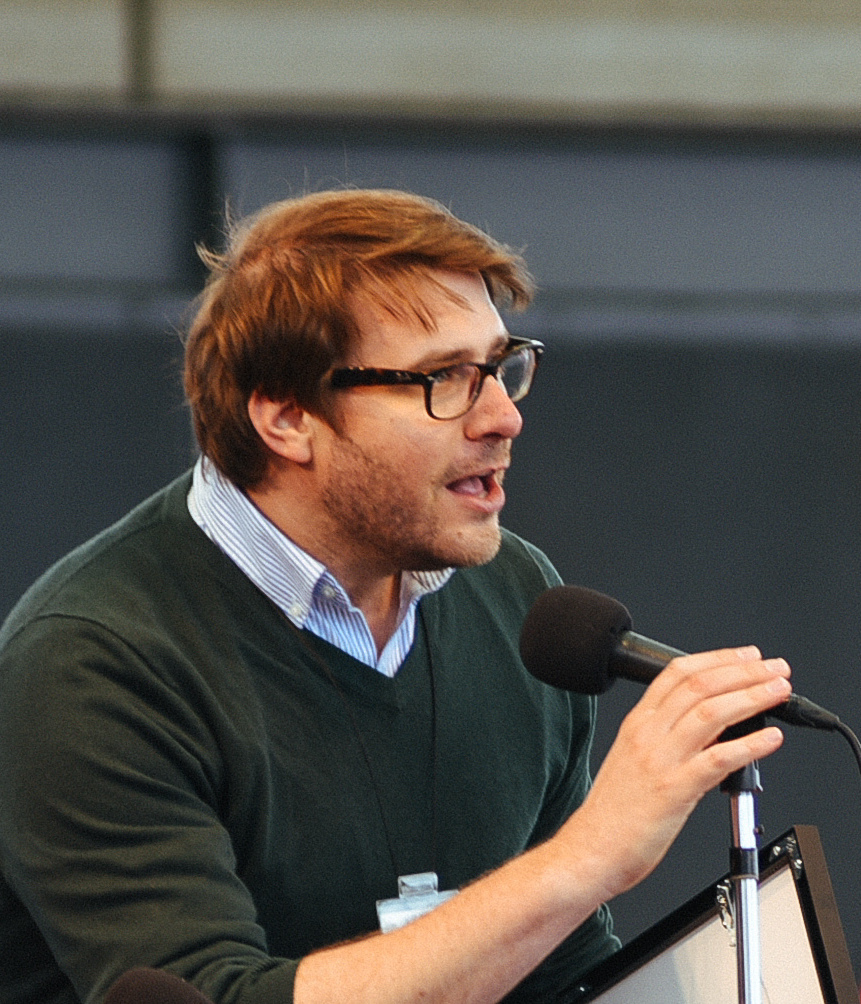
- Auxier in 2015
- Born: August 10, 1981 (age 45); Vancouver, British Columbia
- Occupation: young adult novelist
- Writing career
- Period: 2000s–present
- Notable works: The Night Gardener; Peter Nimble and his Fantastic Eyes

Jonathan Auxier (born August 10, 1981) is a Canadian-American writer of young adult literature. Auxier is a New York Times bestselling and critically acclaimed author for his works of The Vanished Kingdom (Peter Nimble and His Fantastic Eyes, Sophie Quire and the Last Storyguard, and The War of the Maps), The Night Gardener, and Sweep.

== Biography ==
Born in Princeton, New Jersey, he spent his early years in Vancouver, British Columbia, Canada. He currently lives in Pittsburgh, Pennsylvania, US with his wife. He earned a BA from Trinity Western University in 2003 and a MFA in Dramatic Writing from Carnegie Mellon University in 2005. During graduate school, Auxier worked on a side project to refresh his creativity which he would eventually develop into the novel Peter Nimble; after graduating, he moved to Los Angeles to pursue a career in screenwriting. He has three daughters, the youngest of whom has Down's Syndrome.

== Awards ==
Auxier won the TD Canadian Children's Literature Award and the Canadian Library Association Book of the Year for Children Award for his 2014 novel The Night Gardener. The book was also a shortlisted finalist for the Governor General's Award for English-language children's literature at the 2014 Governor General's Awards.

He won the Governor General's Award at the 2018 Governor General's Awards for Sweep: The Story of a Girl and Her Monster. Sweep also won the Children's/YA prize at the 2019 Vine Awards for Canadian Jewish Literature.

== Bibliography ==
Standalone works

- — (May 20, 2014). The Night Gardener. Amulet Books. ISBN 978-1-4197-1144-2.
- — (September 25, 2018). Sweep: The Story of a Girl and her Monster. Amulet Books. ISBN 978-1-4197-3140-2.

The Fabled Stables series

- — (April 12, 2022). Willa the Wisp. Amulet Books. ISBN 978-1-4197-4271-2.
- — (May 18, 2021). Trouble with Tattle-Tails. Amulet Books. ISBN 978-1-4197-4272-9.
- — (February 22, 2022). Belly of the Beast. Amulet Books. ISBN 978-1-4197-4274-3.

The Vanished Kingdom series

- — (August 1, 2011). Peter Nimble and his Fantastic Eyes. Amulet Books. ISBN 978-1-4197-0025-5.
- — (April 5, 2016). Sophie Quire and the Last Storyguard. Amulet Books. ISBN 978-1-4197-1747-5.
- — (April 29, 2025). The War of the Maps. Amulet Books. ISBN 978-1-4197-5394-7.
