= Spies of No Country =

2019 book by Matti Friedman

Spies of No Country: Secret Lives at the Birth of Israel
- First edition
- Author: Matti Friedman
- Publisher: Algonquin Books
- Publication date: March 2019

Spies of No Country: Secret Lives at the Birth of Israel is a book by Matti Friedman published in March 2019.

Spies of No Country is about a pre-Israeli independence Zionist intelligence unit, the "Arab Section," that operated inside the territory of the French Mandate for Syria and the Lebanon towards the end of the British Mandate for Palestine.

== Synopsis ==
Spies is the story of four Mizrachi men. They were not related to one another despite the fact that three of them shared a surname. They were Gamliel Cohen and Isaac Shoshan, who grew up in Syria, Havakuk Cohen from Yemen, Yakuba Cohen, from Mandatory Palestine. All four were native Arabic speakers. They operated as mista'arvim, "Ones Who Become Like Arabs," but Friedman raises an interesting question, "They were native to the Arab world," Friedman writes, "as native as Arabs. If the key to belonging to the Arabic nation was the Arabic language, as the Arab nationalists claimed, they were inside. So were they really...pretending to be Arabs, or were they pretending to be people who weren't Arabs pretending to be Arabs?"

== Reception ==
Lily Meyer, reviewing the book for National Public Radio, called Spies "an important book (because) Americans are not accustomed to hearing about Israel's complexity, or its diversity. We are rarely asked to consider Israel as a country that is, as Friedman says, 'more than one thing.'"

Bill Gladstone wrote that "In lesser hands, this story might not be capable of sustaining the interest of readers through more than 200 pages, but Friedman is a natural-born storyteller whose simple but compelling language, and level of insight and sensitivity, seem to anticipate and settle questions in the readers’ minds even before they arise." For example, early in the book Friedman writes that, "“The unwritten rules of espionage writing seem to require a claim that the subjects altered the very course of history, or at least of their war... This is tempting but rarely true, I suspect, and it isn’t true in the case of our spies, though their contribution to the war was significant. Their mission didn’t culminate in a dramatic explosion that averted disaster, or in the solution of a devious puzzle. Their importance to history lies instead in what they turned out to be – the embryo of one of the world’s most formidable intelligence services [the Mossad]...”

In a review published in The Forward, Raphael Magarik notes that he believes Friedman overlooked evidence that did not support his argument, and misrepresented events. He nevertheless praised Friedman's storytelling.

Mimi Pomeranz, in her review of Spies of No Country, discusses the background of the four spies and the effect that Mizrahi Jewish history like their’s has on American and European Jews who think of Israel as “Ashkenazi.” She quotes Friedman:

“Understanding Israel in the 21st century means thinking less about Europe and more about the Middle East. Not only are Israel’s surroundings Middle Eastern, and not only were most Israelis alive today born in the Middle East, but the native culture of much of Israel’s population is Middle Eastern and Mediterranean. As the old elite of the kibbutz movement has faded, this culture has come to the fore – in religion, politics, pop music, and food. It shapes every aspect of life in the country. This makes Israel increasingly hard for North Americans, natives of a different culture and of Jewish communities almost entirely European in background, to understand.”

== Awards ==
Spies of No Country won the 2018, pre-publication, $25,000 Nathan Book Award, a prize given by the Nathan Fund in conjunction with the Jewish Book Council to support the work of a writer whose book has not yet been published.

In 2020, the book won the vine awards for canadian jewish literature for history.
