= Rona Altrows =

Canadian writer and editor

- Born: 1948 (age 77–78)
- Occupations: Writer, Editor
- Website: www.ronaaltrows.com

Rona Altrows (born 1948) is a Canadian writer and editor. Her books include short fiction, a children's book, and two literary anthologies. Her stories and essays have appeared in literary magazines and newspapers across Canada.

== Biography ==
Altrows grew up in Montreal, Quebec. In 1979 she moved to Calgary, Alberta and has lived there ever since. She has been a writer-in-residence for the Calgary Public Library and the Alexandra Writers' Centre Society, also located in Calgary.

== Bibliography ==
Please Don’t Interrupt (co-authored with Uchechukwu Umezurike). Griots Lounge (2025)

=== Short fiction ===
- At This Juncture: A Book of Letters (Now or Never Publishing, 2018)
- Rouleauville (Loft on Eighth, 2016)
- Key in Lock (Recliner Books, 2010)
- A Run on Hose (Thistledown Press, 2005)

=== Anthologies, editor ===
- Waiting: An Anthology of Essays, with Julie Sedivy (University of Alberta Press, 2018)
- Shy: An Anthology, with Naomi K. Lewis (University of Alberta Press, 2013)

=== Children's fiction ===
- The River Throws a Tantrum, with Sarah-Joy Goode (Rona Altrows, 2013)

== Awards and honours ==
Rona Altrows is the winner of two Alberta Literary Awards: the City of Calgary W.O. Mitchell Book Prize for A Run on Hose, and the Jon Whyte Memorial Essay Prize for "Letter of Intent". She has twice been nominated for the Howard O'Hagan Award for Short Story. With Naomi K. Lewis, she was awarded an Independent Publisher Book Award (IPPY) for Shy: An Anthology. Altrows was the inaugural winner of the Brenda Strathern Writing Prize.
