= The Aleppo Codex =

2012 book by Matti Friedman

The Aleppo Codex: A True Story of Obsession, Faith, and the Pursuit of an Ancient Bible
- First edition
- Author: Matti Friedman
- Language: English
- Genre: Non-fiction
- Publisher: Algonquin Books
- Publication date: 2012

The Aleppo Codex: A True Story of Obsession, Faith, and the Pursuit of an Ancient Bible is a 2012 book by Matti Friedman published by Algonquin. The book tells the story of how the Aleppo Codex, one of the world's oldest extant Bibles, was saved from destruction during the 1947 Aleppo pogrom, how it was smuggled into Israel, and what became of the missing pages. The Wall Street Journal calls Friedman's book "a detective thriller," noting that, "not everything about the codex is as it seems."

== Prizes ==
The Aleppo Codex won the 2014 Sami Rohr Prize for Jewish Literature, was selected as one of Booklist's top ten religion and spirituality books of 2012, was awarded the American Library Association's 2013 Sophie Brody Medal and the 2013 Canadian Jewish Book Award for history, and received second place for the Religion Newswriters Association's 2013 nonfiction religion book of the year.
