= Nate Dern =

American writer and actor

- Born: November 30, 1984 (age 41); Denver, United States
- Education: Harvard University
- Occupation: Writer
- Partner: Miranda Erokan
- Writing career
- Language: English
- Genre: Comedy
- Notable works: Not Quite a Genius; Mr. Student Body President

Nate Dern (born November 30, 1984) is an American writer and actor. His first book, Not Quite a Genius, was published by Simon & Schuster on August 8, 2017. Dern is a senior writer at Funny Or Die and the former artistic director of the Upright Citizens Brigade Theatre in New York City. In 2007 Dern was a contestant on season 3 of the reality television series Beauty and the Geek.

== Background and career ==
Dern was born and raised in Colorado. He attended Evergreen High School (Evergreen, Colorado) and then enrolled at Harvard University where he became a member and later tsar of the improv group The Immediate Gratification Players. After graduating from Harvard, Dern attended Cambridge University and earned an MPhil in Screen Media and Culture. Dern then moved to New York City to begin a Ph.D. program in sociology at Columbia University. While living in New York City, Dern began taking improv comedy classes at the Upright Citizens Brigade Theatre, eventually becoming a performer, then a teacher, then the artistic director. Dern joined Funny or Die as a senior writer in 2014.

== Books ==
As a writer at Funny or Die in 2007, Dern received a book deal from Simon & Schuster. Dern's first book, Not Quite a Genius, is a collection of humor pieces, short stories, and personal essays. It was originally entitled In Case of Fire, Use Stairs: And Other Plans That Seemed Like a Good Idea at the Time. It was selected as a 2017 summer "must read" by Domino Magazine and CraveOnline.

Dern has written for McSweeney's, The New Yorker, New York Magazine, Outside Magazine, Vice, and other outlets.

== Filmography ==
=== Film ===
Year	Title	Role	Notes
2015	Youth	Actor	Funny Screenwriter
2014	The Sisterhood of Night	Actor	Interviewer
2014	Time Out of Mind	Actor	Donald

=== Television ===
Year	Title	Role	Notes
2016	Mr. Student Body President	Writer	2 episodes
2015	Last Week Tonight with John Oliver	Actor	Public Urinator
2013	Boardwalk Empire	Actor	Agent
2012	Gossip Girl	Actor	Connor
2008	Beauty and the Geek	Himself	1 episode
2007	Beauty and the Geek	Himself	10 episodes
