= Mista'arvim =

Israeli undercover counter-terrorism units

Mista‘arvim or mista‘aravim (Hebrew: מִסְתַּעַרְבִים; Arabic: مُسْتَعْرِبِين, romanized: musta‘ribīn, lit. 'Arabized') is the name given to certain units in the Israel Defense Forces, Israel Border Police, and Israel Police that assimilate into local Arab populations to operate undercover while gathering intelligence or conducting law enforcement, hostage rescue, sabotage and targeted assassinations. The Mista'arvim are also known for infiltrating and abducting demonstrators during protests.

== Name ==
The Hebrew word mista‘arev (plural mista‘arvim) is a Hebraization of the Arabic musta‘rib, meaning "he who has become Arab", which refers to both the Musta'arabi Jews, Arabic-speaking Jews who lived in the Middle East from the beginning of Arab rule in the 7th century prior to the arrival of Ladino-speaking Sephardic Jews following their expulsion from Spain in 1492, and the Mozarabs of al-Andalus.

== Description ==
Members of mista‘arvim units are specifically trained to assimilate among the Arab population and operate within Arab societies to accomplish their missions. Gary Spedding, a consultant on the Middle East, said that the activity of mista‘arvim "allows the Israeli military and border police to identify protesters they wish to arrest and detain. Israeli affairs expert Antoine Shalhat claimed that the main missions of the mista‘arvim "include gathering intelligence and counterterrorist operations." Mista‘arvim dress as Arabs, know the customs and etiquette of Arab society and speak fluent Arabic, in the appropriate dialect. Mista‘arvim have participated in public demonstrations and may support the protests as if they were demonstrators.

== History ==
A mista‘arvim unit, with the code-name ha-Shahar (The Dawn) was established secretly by the Palmach in 1943 and consisted mainly of native Arabic-speaking Sephardic Jews, virtually indistinguishable from Arabs generally. With the outbreak of the 1948 independence War in November 1947, members of ha-Shahar were deployed as intelligence agents capable of penetrating Arab urban neighbourhoods and villages and, at times, in sabotage and assassinations. In 1948, the commander of this Arab platoon Moshe Ben-Zvi expressed interest in assisting Israeli operations of biological warfare. It appears that subsequently, on 21 May, two mista‘arvim, David Mizrahi and Ezra Horin, operating out of Dorot and kibbutz Gevar‘am were captured by Egyptian troops as they attempted to poison with typhoid and diphtheria bacteria the wells from which Egyptian troops in Gaza drew their water supplies, an incident which led Egypt to make a formal protest to the Secretary General of the United Nations later that month. In his book, Spies of No Country, Matti Friedman tells the history of a pre-statehood unit operating in Lebanon and Syria.

On 25 May 2021, a Palestinian man and resident of the Al-Am'ari refugee camp named Ahmad Jamil Fahd was killed by the Mista'arvim in Al-Bireh.

== Training ==
Training for these units takes about 15 months:

- Four months basic infantry training at the Mitkan Adam army base – the IDF Special Training Center – near Modi'in-Maccabim-Re'ut.
- Two and a half months of advanced infantry training in the same base.
- Two months of the unit's basic training, which focus on advanced urban navigation and the beginning of counter-terrorism training.
- Four months mista‘arvim training, which covers everything from learning Arab traditions, language, and way of thought, to civilian camouflage (hair dyeing, contact lenses, clothing).
- One month courses – sniper, driving and different instructor courses.

== Known units ==
The first mista‘arvim unit, known as the "Arab Department" (ha-Maḥlaka ha-Aravit), was established in 1942 as a unit of the Palmach. Other mista‘arvim groups in Israel have included:

- Sayeret Shaked, a unit of the IDF, which operated undercover in the Gaza Strip in the 1970s
- The Samson Unit, or Unit 367, which operated in the Gaza Strip until its disbandment in 1994 after the Oslo Accords
- Rimon, operating from 1987 until 2005 in Gaza
- Sayeret Duvdevan (Unit 217), established in the West Bank in the 1980s and still operating
- Yamas, a unit of the Israel Border Police
- Gideonim (Unit 33), an undercover mista‘arvim unit of the Israeli Police, still operating
- Hermesh (Hebrew acronym for "armored motorized infantry"), operating in the West Bank until 1994, when it was transferred to the Kfir Brigade

== See also ==
- Israeli special forces units
- Fauda, an Israeli television series which tells the story of Doron, a commander in the Mista'arvim unit and his team
- Eli Cohen, Egyptian-born Israeli spy known for his work in Egypt and Syria
- Zvi Yehezkeli, Israeli journalist who lived under Arab aliases in Europe and the U.S. in 2016–17 to investigate the Muslim Brotherhood and its influence; he posed as a sheikh. In the 1990s he lived in the Palestinian cities of Hebron and Jenin with the stated aim of perfecting his knowledge of the Arabic language and culture.
- Oz Brigade
