= Brenda Strathern Writing Prize =

Canadian literary award

The Brenda Strathern Writing Prize was created in 2001 and is awarded exclusively for writers who reside in Calgary, Alberta, Canada. Recipients must be 40 years of age or older, and unpublished. It is an annual prize that sums $5000 Canadian dollars.

The prize was created in memory of Ms. Brenda Strathern, who came to writing later in her life and died before she achieved publication. Her children, Henry and Madeline, curate the prize through the Calgary Foundation.

Winners include Rona Altrows.
