= Life of a Craphead =

- Members: Amy Ching-Yan Lam & Jon McCurley
- Years Active: 2006 - 2020
- Known For: Performance, comedy, conceptual art
- Website: www.lifeofacraphead.com

Life of a Craphead was a Toronto-based performance artist duo made up of Amy Ching-Yan Lam and Jon McCurley. Lam and McCurley began working together in 2006 as a sketch comedy troupe after meeting at a zine fair. They continued to expand their practice which is noted for experimenting with performance, film, installation, theatre, and sculpture. They have shown widely across Canada, including at the Art Gallery of Ontario, The Power Plant, Gallery TPW, Centre Clark, Dazibao, AKA, Truck Gallery, and the Banff Centre.

Life of a Craphead was the Art Gallery of Ontario's Artist-in-Residence from January to March 2013. In April they were selected to organize and curated an artistic seminar and performance event for Trampoline Hall at the Garrison, Toronto.

Every Sunday from October 29 until November 29, 2017, Life of a Craphead performed King Edward VII Equestrian Statue Floating Down the Don, floating a replica of an equestrian sculpture of King Edward VII down the Don River. The original 15-foot bronze sculpture was erected in India in 1922 to commemorate the Edward VII's reign as emperor. Toronto businessman Harry Jackman paid to have the bronze figure moved to Toronto from India, where it had been placed in storage after the India became independent in 1947. It was installed in Queens Park in 1969.

== Selection of Work ==
- Entertaining Every Second (2019)
- $100 Bill With South Asian Scientist Added Back In (2019)
- Find the US Soldier Who Killed Your Grandma (2018)
- Angry Edit (2018)
- The Quiet American but Only the Parts Where the White Man Main Character Tells the Asian Woman to Do Stuff for Him (2018)
- King Edward VII Equestrian Statue Floating Down the Don (2017)
- Doored (2012–2017)
- Bugs (2015)
- The Life of a Craphead Fifty Year Retrospective, 2006-2056 (2013)
- Double Double Land (2009)
- Free Lunch (2007)
- Musical Road (2007)
