= Ester Reiter =

American-Canadian historian and sociologist (born 1941)

- Born: 1941 (age 84–85); Brooklyn, New York, USA
- Children: 2

Academic background
- Education: BA, 1962, History, Brandeis University; MA., Sociology, Washington State University; PhD., 1985, Sociology, University of Toronto
- Thesis: Out of the frying pan and into the fryer: the organization of work in a fast food outlet (1985)

Academic work
- Institutions: Memorial University of Newfoundland; Queen's University; Brock University; York University
- Main interests: Women, Sociology, Secular Jewish left in Canada; Immigrant Women; Gender, Race and Ethnicity; Left Politics, the Cold War and the War on Terror; Women and Work

Ester Reiter (née Koulack; 1941) is an American-Canadian historian and sociologist. She is a professor emerita in the School of Gender, Sexuality and Women's Studies at York University. In 2017, her book A Future Without Hate or Need was shortlisted for the Vine Awards for Canadian Jewish Literature.

== Early life and education ==
Reiter came from a Jewish family and was born in Brooklyn, New York. She moved to Winnipeg in the 1960s and joined Canadian Voice of Women For Peace protests. She graduated from Brandeis University in 1962.

She left Winnipeg to pursue her PhD at York University in Toronto, Ontario. In order to complete her thesis, Reiter worked at a Toronto-based Burger King to observe how work is organized in fast food.

== Career ==
After earning her PhD, Reiter had a limited appointment as a professor of sociology at Memorial University. She was then hired by Queen's University in 1986 as a sociology professor before being hired as an associate professor at Brock University.

She stayed at Brock until the 2002–03 academic term when Reiter was given a full-time appointment as an associate professor in the School of Gender, Sexuality and Women's Studies at York University. She retired from teaching in 2011.

In 2016, she launched her book A Future Without Hate or Need. The book was a study of how left-wing secular Judaism in Canada survived and flourished from the 1920s to 1960s. The book was shortlisted for the 2017 Vine Awards for Canadian Jewish Literature.

In 2018, Reiter protested the Progressive Conservative Party of Canada for invoking the notwithstanding clause in the middle of a municipal election campaign. She refused to leave Queen's Park and was escorted out.

== Selected publications ==
The following is a list of selected publications:

- Women in a Changing Economy (1989)
- Making Fast Food: From the Frying Pan into the Fryer (1991)
- Racism, anti-semitism, anti-feminism and the new hate mongers (1994)
- First-Class Workers Don′t Want Second-Class Wages: The Lanark Strike in Dunnville (1995)
- A future without hate or need: the promise of the Jewish left in Canada (2016)
