= Aaron Kreuter =

Canadian writer

Aaron Kreuter is a Canadian writer based in Toronto, Ontario.

He published his debut poetry collection Arguments for Lawn Chairs in 2016, and followed up with his first short story collection, You and Me, Belonging, in 2018.

You and Me, Belonging was a nominee for the 2019 ReLit Award for short fiction and the 2019 Vine Awards for Canadian Jewish Literature, and his poetry collection Shifting Baseline Syndrome was nominated for the Governor General's Award for English-language poetry at the 2022 Governor General's Awards.
