= Trampoline Hall =

Trampoline Hall is a barroom lecture series started by Canadian author Sheila Heti in Toronto. It has been sold out consistently since 2001.

== Format ==
Trampoline Hall is held every month at The Garrison, a club in Toronto's west end. The program consists of three talks each followed by a question-and-answer period, and is hosted by improv teacher and consultant Misha Glouberman. Speakers are chosen by a curator. Past curators include Sheila Heti, Margaux Williamson, Life of a Craphead, and Xenia Benivolski.

Lecturers may speak on any subject from the mundane to the arcane, but are forbidden to speak on any area in which they are professionally expert. As a result, talks vary from the well-informed to the unstructured, with the lecturer's level of comfort and degree of preparation emerging as part of the "performance". Over a few months in 2010-2011, representative topics included "The History of 3D," "Suicide Notes," "Cultural Entropy in the Internet Era," "The Perfect Baguette," and "Being an Asshole."

== Reception ==
The show went on a 10-city tour of the US in 2002 and has played numerous shows in New York and San Francisco. It has been written about favourably in The New Yorker, The Village Voice, the National Post, the Globe and Mail, and other publications.
