= Naomi K. Lewis =

Canadian fiction and nonfiction writer (born 1976)

Naomi K. Lewis (born 1976 in London, England) is a Canadian fiction and nonfiction writer who resides in Calgary, Alberta. She was a finalist for the 2019 Governor General's Literary Award for non-fiction.

== Life and career ==
Lewis was born in London, and grew up near Washington, D.C. and in Ottawa. Her sister and brother-in-law are the artists Chloe Lewis and Andrew Taggart, and her great-uncle was the poet and artist Izrael Lejzerowicz. Lewis lived in Toronto, Fredericton and Edmonton, and completed degrees in philosophy and English literature, before settling in Calgary. She served as writer-in-residence both at the Calgary Public Library in 2011, and at the University of New Brunswick in 2015. Lewis was an associate editor of Alberta Views magazine from 2012 to 2015.

== Works ==
Lewis's first novel, Cricket in a Fist, was published by Goose Lane Editions in 2008. Lewis's story, "The Guiding Light" won the 2007 Fiddlehead fiction contest and appeared in McClelland and Stewart's 2008 Journey Prize Anthology. Lewis' collection of short stories I Know Who You Remind Me Of won the 2012 Colophon Prize, from Great Plains Publishing. Lewis's 2011 Alberta Views article "The Urge to Purge", about detox diets, was shortlisted for a 2011 Canadian National Magazine Award, as was her 2014 article "A Bridge Too Far: The Story of My Big Jewish Nose." With Calgary writer Rona Altrows, she edited an anthology of essays and poetry about shyness entitled Shy, published by the University of Alberta Press in 2013.

Lewis also co-wrote In Case of Fire, a 2010 memoir about Edmonton burn survivor and workplace safety advocate Spencer Beach.

More recently, Lewis's 2019 memoir Tiny Lights for Travellers won Alberta's Wilfrid Eggleston Award for Nonfiction, the Vine Award for Canadian Jewish Literature (nonfiction), and the Pinsky Givon Family Prize for Nonfiction, a Western Canada Jewish Book Award. It was a finalist for the Governor General's Literary Award for Non-Fiction and the W.O. Mitchell City of Calgary Book Award.
