= Sheila Heti =

Canadian writer (born 1976)

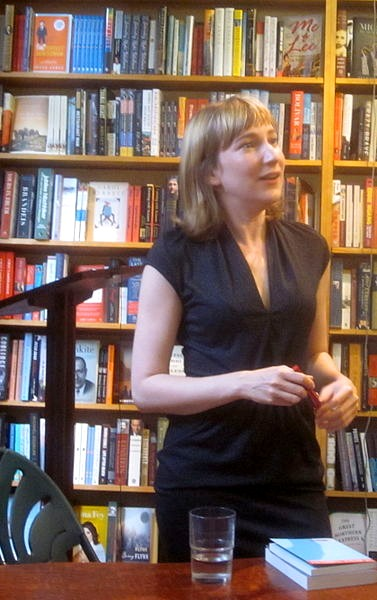
- Heti in 2013
- Born: 25 December 1976 (age 49); Toronto, Ontario, Canada
- Education: National Theatre School of Canada; University of Toronto
- Occupations: Novelist, short story writer, playwright
- Writing career
- Language: English
- Notable works: How Should a Person Be?; Motherhood; Pure Colour; Alphabetical Diaries
- Notable awards: Governor General's Award for English-language fiction (2022)
- Website: sheilaheti.com

Sheila Heti (/ˈʃiːlə ˈhɛtiː/; born 25 December 1976) is a Canadian writer in English.

== Early life ==
Sheila Heti was born on 25 December 1976 in Toronto. Her parents are Hungarian Jewish immigrants. Her brother is comedian David Heti.

Sheila Heti attended St. Clement's School in Toronto. She graduated from North Toronto Collegiate Institute in Toronto. She then studied playwriting at the National Theatre School of Canada (leaving the program after one year) and then art history as well as philosophy at the University of Toronto. Heti said that Marquis de Sade and Henry Miller are early literary influences of hers.

== Career ==
=== Writing ===
Heti's writing spans a variety of genres including plays, short fiction, and novels. She has contributed to periodicals such as Flare, London Review of Books, Brick, Open Letters, Maisonneuve, Bookforum, n+1, the Look, McSweeney's, The New Yorker, and the New York Times. Her books have been published internationally, including France, Italy, Germany, Spain, The Netherlands, Sweden, and Denmark.

She formerly worked as the interviews editor at The Believer where she conducts interviews regularly. She contributed a column on acting to Maisonneuve. Heti is the creator of Trampoline Hall, a popular monthly lecture series based in Toronto and New York at which people speak on subjects outside their areas of expertise. The New Yorker praised the series for "celebrating eccentricity and do-it-yourself inventiveness". It has sold out every show since its inception in December 2001.

For the early part of 2008, Heti kept a blog called The Metaphysical Poll, where she posted the dreams people had in their sleep about Barack Obama and Hillary Clinton during the 2008 primary season, which readers submitted.

=== Acting and theater ===
Heti was an actress as a child and as a teenager appeared in shows directed by Hillar Liitoja, the founder and artistic director of the experimental DNA Theatre.

She appears in Margaux Williamson's 2010 film Teenager Hamlet and plays Lenore Doolan from Leanne Shapton's book Important Artifacts and Personal Property from the Collection of Lenore Doolan and Harold Morris, including Books, Street Fashion, and Jewelry. In November 2013, Jordan Tannahill directed Heti's play All Our Happy Days Are Stupid at Toronto's Videofag. It was remounted in February 2015 at The Kitchen in New York. Her decade-long struggle to write the play is a primary plot element in her novel How Should a Person Be?

== Books ==
=== The Middle Stories ===
Heti's first book, The Middle Stories, a collection of thirty short stories, was published by House of Anansi in Canada in 2001 when she was twenty-four. It was published by McSweeney's in the United States in 2002. It has been translated into German, French, Spanish, and Dutch.

=== Ticknor ===
Heti's novella, Ticknor, was released in 2005. The novel's main characters are based on real people: William Hickling Prescott and George Ticknor, although the facts of their lives are altered. It was published by House of Anansi Press in Canada, Farrar, Straus & Giroux in the United States, and Éditions Phébus in France.

=== How Should a Person Be? ===
Heti's How Should a Person Be? was published in September 2010. She describes it as a work of constructed reality, based on recorded interviews with her friends, particularly the painter Margaux Williamson. It was published by Henry Holt in the United States in July 2012 in a slightly different edition (she has spoken in interviews about the edits she made), and the subtitle "A Novel from Life" was added. It was chosen by The New York Times as one of the 100 Best Books of 2012 and by James Wood of The New Yorker as one of the best books of the year. It was also included on year-end lists on Salon, The New Republic, The New York Observer, and more publications.

In her 2007 interview with Dave Hickey for The Believer, she noted, "Increasingly I'm less interested in writing about fictional people, because it seems so tiresome to make up a fake person and put them through the paces of a fake story. I just–I can't do it."

=== The Chairs Are Where the People Go ===
In 2011, she published The Chairs Are Where the People Go, which she wrote with her friend, Misha Glouberman. The New Yorker called it "a triumph of conversational philosophy" and named it one of the Best Books of 2011.

=== We Need a Horse ===
McSweeney's commissioned the children's book from Heti; it was illustrated by Clare Rojas.

=== Women in Clothes ===
In Fall 2014, Heti published a non-fiction book about women's relationship to what they wear, with co-editors Leanne Shapton and Heidi Julavits. It was a crowd-sourced book, featuring the voices of 639 women from around the world. The book was published by Penguin in the US and the UK, with a German edition published in 2015 by S. Fischer, Frankfurt am Main. It was on The New York Times Best Seller list for several months.

=== Motherhood ===
In May 2018, Heti published an autobiographical novel, Motherhood, focused on her deliberation on whether to have children. Initially conceived as a non-fiction work, Heti explores the emphasis society places on motherhood and how women are judged regardless of their decision: "... a woman will always be made to feel like a criminal, whatever choice she makes, however hard she tries. Mothers feel like criminals. Nonmothers do, too." The book was named as a shortlisted finalist for the 2018 Scotiabank Giller Prize.

LitHub named her novel, Motherhood, as a Favorite Book of 2018 and a New York Times Critics Pick of 2018.

=== Pure Colour ===
Pure Colour, a novel exploring the human condition, appeared in 2022. It was the winner of the Governor General's Award for English-language fiction at the 2022 Governor General's Awards. The novel is a meditation and exploration on creation, as the protagonist, Mira, is living in the "first draft of creation." Through Mira's journey of friendship, love, loss and grief, Heti simultaneously seeks what it means to create and what it means for oneself to be a product of creation. Creation is explored through the cosmology of the "creation story" and through art, interpersonal relationships and self-identity.

=== Alphabetical Diaries ===
Alphabetical Diaries was released in early 2024. Heti had taken a decade's worth of diaries and ordered the sentences alphabetically, before spending another decade or so paring them down into a new book.

== Awards ==
Year	Work	Prize	Result	Ref.
1994	—	YTV Achievement Award Writing	Won	
2001	—	Now Best Emerging Author	Won	
2002	—	Now Best Emerging Author	Won	
2002	—	KM Hunter Artists Award	Won	
2003	—	Now Best Emerging Author	Won	
2004	—	Now Best Emerging Author	Won	
2013	How Should a Person Be?	ReLit Award	Longlisted	
2013	How Should a Person Be?	Women's Prize for Fiction	Longlisted	
2014	Women in Clothes	Quill and Quire Book of the Year for Nonfiction	Won	
2018	Motherhood	Giller Prize	Shortlisted	
2022	Pure Colour	Giller Prize	Longlisted	
2022	Pure Colour	Governor General's Award for English-language fiction	Won	
2023	Pure Colour	Folio Prize for Fiction	Shortlisted	

== Personal life ==
Heti lives in Toronto.

== Works ==
=== Short story collections ===
- The Middle Stories (2001). House of Anansi Press.

=== Novels and novellas ===
- Ticknor (2005). House of Anansi Press.
- How Should a Person Be? (2010). House of Anansi Press.
- Motherhood (2018). Henry Holt and Company. ISBN 9781627790772.
- Pure Colour (2022). Knopf Canada. ISBN 9780735282452.

=== Non-fiction books ===
- The Chairs Are Where the People Go (2011), with Misha Glouberman. Farrar, Straus and Giroux. ISBN 9780865479456.
- Alphabetical Diaries (2024). Farrar, Straus and Giroux. ISBN 9780374610784.

=== Children's books ===
- We Need a Horse (2011). Illustrated by Clare Rojas. McSweeney's. ISBN 9781936365401.
- A Garden of Creatures (2022). Illustrated by Esmé Shapiro. Tundra Books. ISBN 9780735268821.

=== Plays ===
- All Our Happy Days Are Stupid (2015). McSweeney's. ISBN 9781940450803.

=== Short stories ===
- "Eleanor".
- "Lilly in the Wintertime".
- "Mermaid in a Jar".
- "My Life Is a Joke".
- "The Poet and the Novelist as Roommates".
- "The Raspberry Bush".
- "The St. Alwynn Girls at Sea".
- "What Changed".

=== Essays ===
- "I Didn't Like Sitting With the Rattle for Hours: On the Motherhood Paintings of Paula Modersohn-Becker and Mary Cassatt". The Brooklyn Rail, October 2017.
- "The New Age Bible". Harper's Magazine, September 2024.

=== Book contributions ===
- Heti, Sheila (2014). "Playlist: Let's Listen to Love". Let's Talk About Love: Why Other People Have Such Bad Taste. By Carl Wilson. New York: Bloomsbury Academic. pp. 271–277. ISBN 978-1-4411-6677-7.

=== Books edited ===
- Women in Clothes (2014), edited by Sheila Heti, Heidi Julavits and Leanne Shapton. Blue Rider Press. ISBN 9780399166563.
- The Best American Nonrequired Reading (2018), edited by Sheila Heti. Mariner Books. ISBN 9781328465818.

=== Interviews ===
- "'I'm All in Favor of the Shifty Artist'". Interview with Frank Stella. The Believer, vol. 6, no. 9, November–December 2008, pp. 40–46.
