= Matti Friedman =

Canadian-born Israeli journalist and author

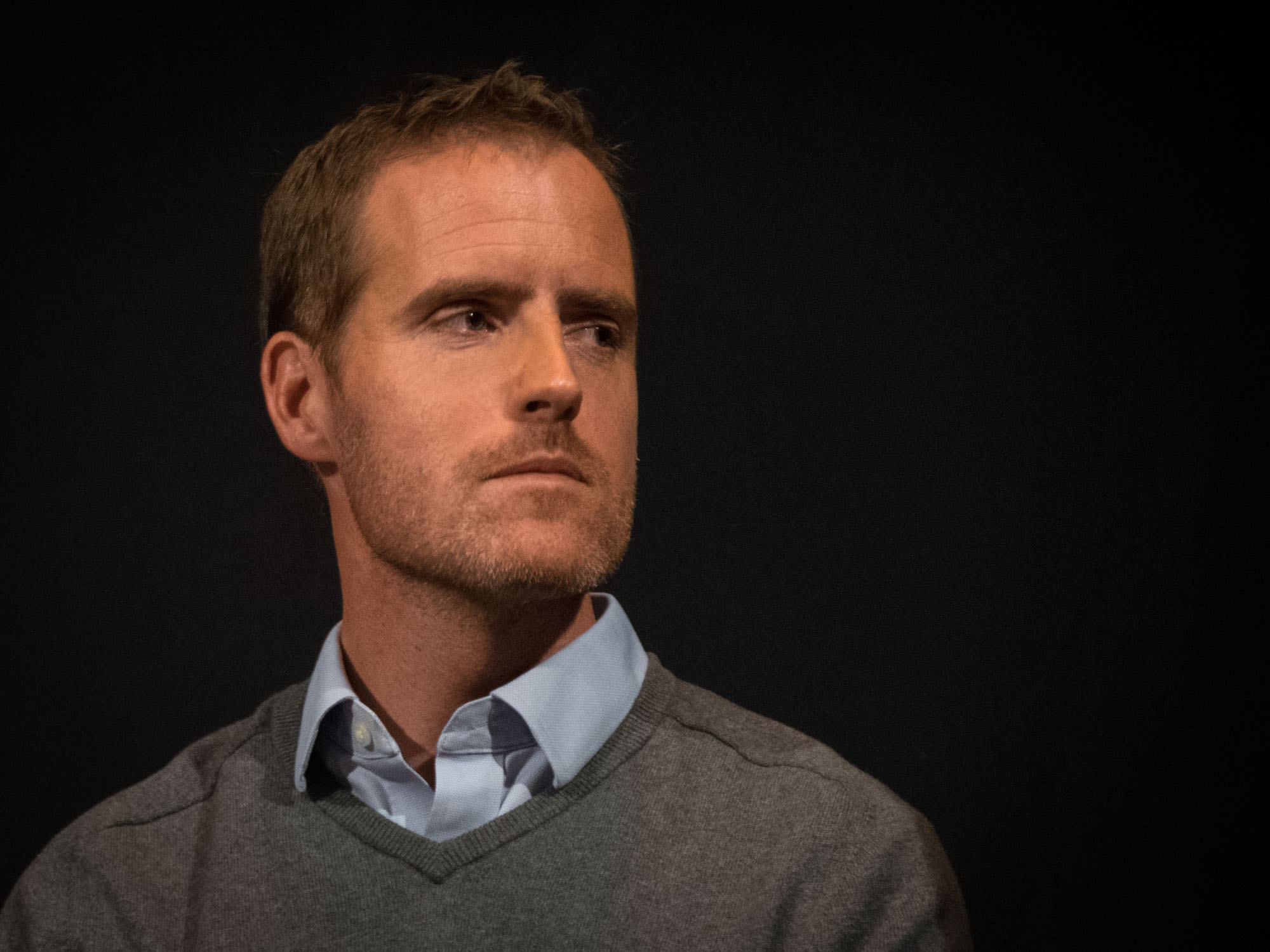
Friedman in 2017

Matti Friedman (Hebrew: מתי פרידמן) is a Canadian-Israeli journalist and author. He is currently a columnist for The Free Press.

== Biography ==
Matti Friedman was born to a Canadian Jewish family and grew up in Toronto. His family attended an Orthodox synagogue. In 1995, he immigrated to Israel at the age of seventeen and settled in Ma'ale Gilboa. His parents and sister joined him a year later.

He was conscripted into the Israel Defense Forces and served in the Nahal Brigade. He was deployed to the Israeli security zone in southern Lebanon during the South Lebanon conflict in the late 1990s, spending much of his service at an Israeli position called Outpost Pumpkin, the name of which was to inspire the title of a book he later wrote about his experiences in Lebanon. Following his military service, he studied at the Hebrew University of Jerusalem.

Friedman is married with three children and lives in Jerusalem. His wife is the descendant of an Old Yishuv Jewish family with roots in the old Sephardi community of Jerusalem and Hebron.

== Career ==
=== Journalism ===
==== AP journalist ====
Between 2006 and the end of 2011, Friedman was a reporter and editor in the Jerusalem bureau of the Associated Press (AP) news agency. During his journalistic career, he also worked as a reporter in Egypt, Morocco, Lebanon, Moscow and Washington, D.C. Friedman first drew wide attention with a pair of essays about anti-Israel media bias that included sharp criticism of the AP.

==== Other journalism ====
Friedman has been an op-ed contributor for The New York Times, and a regular contributor at The Times of Israel. He was a columnist at Tablet magazine, writing articles from 2013 to 2022.

=== Author ===
==== The Aleppo Codex ====
Friedman's book, The Aleppo Codex: A True Story of Obsession, Faith and the Pursuit of an Ancient Bible, published in May 2012 by Algonquin Books, is an account of how the Aleppo Codex, "the oldest, most complete, most accurate text of the Hebrew Bible," came to reside in Israel. It was believed that many pages had disappeared from the codex during the 1947 Anti-Jewish riots in Aleppo when the Central Synagogue of Aleppo, where the codex was housed, was set on fire and badly damaged. Friedman concludes instead that it arrived in Israel essentially intact, and that a particular Israeli scholar (whom he names) was most likely responsible for the loss. Moreover, contrary to the usual understanding that the codex was willingly given to the state of Israel, Friedman reports on the sealed transcripts of a court battle in which the Jews of Aleppo attempted to recover it from the state.

The book won the 2014 Sami Rohr Prize for Jewish Literature, was selected as one of Booklist's top ten religion and spirituality books of 2012, was awarded the American Library Association's 2013 Sophie Brody Medal and the 2013 Canadian Jewish Book Award for history, and received second place for the Religion Newswriters Association's 2013 nonfiction religion book of the year.

==== Pumpkinflowers: South Lebanon conflict ====
Friedman's 2016 book, Pumpkinflowers: A Soldier's Story of a Forgotten War, is about his experiences as an IDF soldier during the South Lebanon conflict.

==== Spies of No Country: pre-independence agents ====
In 2019, Friedman published Spies of No Country: Secret Lives at the Birth of Israel, the story of four Arabic-speaking Jews who operated an Israeli, pre-independence Zionist intelligence unit, the "Arab Section," in Beirut, then in the territory of the French Mandate for Syria and the Lebanon towards the end of the British Mandate for Palestine. The book won the 2018 Natan Book Award.

==== Who by Fire: Leonard Cohen in the Sinai ====
In 2022, Friedman released Who by Fire: Leonard Cohen in the Sinai, an account of Leonard Cohen's almost-forgotten visit to Israel and the occupied Sinai during the Yom Kippur war. Few photographs have survived of the visit, and Cohen himself rarely discussed the visit in later years. Friedman tracks down soldiers who remember Cohen's impromptu appearances near the battlefront and speculates about the impact of the visit on Cohen's subsequent life and career. The book was selected as one of the year's best books by Vanity Fair, was optioned for the screen by 66 Media and Keshet International, and adapted as a successful stage show in Israel.

==== Out of the Sky: Heroism and Rebirth in Nazi Europe ====
In 2026, Friedman released Out of the Sky: Heroism and Rebirth in Nazi Europe, a first-person account of his investigation into the stories of Hannah Szenes, Enzo Sereni, Yoel Palgi and Haviva Reik. The four were part of a group of 38 Jewish volunteers from Mandatory Palestine who parachuted into occupied Europe to support Allied efforts and help rescue Jews facing extermination.

== Views and opinions ==
Following the 2014 Israel–Gaza conflict, Friedman wrote an essay criticizing what he views as the international media's bias against Israel and undue focus on the country, stating that news organizations treat it as "most important story on earth". He said when he was a correspondent at the AP,

the agency had more than 40 staffers covering Israel and the Palestinian territories. That was significantly more news staff than the AP had in China, Russia, or India, or in all of the 50 countries of sub-Saharan Africa combined. It was higher than the total number of news-gathering employees in all the countries where the uprisings of the "Arab Spring" eventually erupted. [...] I don't mean to pick on the AP—the agency is wholly average, which makes it useful as an example. The big players in the news business practice groupthink, and these staffing arrangements were reflected across the herd.

Friedman attributed this disproportionate interest in Israel to the preconceptions of international journalists who fail to understand the historical, cultural, and political differences between the Israeli-arab conflict and the social conflicts back at their home countries:

people went looking for a country that would symbolize the sins of our new post-colonial, post-militaristic, post-ethnic dream-world, the country they chose was [Israel]. (...) The Jews of Israel are the screen onto which it has become socially acceptable to project the things you hate about yourself and your own country. The tool through which this psychological projection is executed is the international press.

Israeli newspaper Haaretz reported that the piece went "viral" on Facebook. The Atlantic then invited Friedman to write a longer article. AP issued a statement, saying that Friedman's "... arguments have been filled with distortions, half-truths and inaccuracies, both about the recent Gaza war and more distant events. His suggestion of AP bias against Israel is false". Veteran journalist Mark Lavie, who worked at the AP's Jerusalem bureau, agrees with Friedman's charges leveled against the AP.

In 2026, Friedman noted in multiple western bookstores that an onslaught of new books on the topic of the October 7th attack by Hamas on Israeli civilians and the Israeli response in Gaza had been written. He coined the term “Gazaology” to describe the new antisemitism movement based on Israel’s response to the attack and kidnapping of its civilian citizens. In a piece published by The Free Press, “Introduction to Gazaology”Friedman describes the new book’s back cover summaries this way:

For me, reading the back covers of these books left the impression of a genre related to the actual territory of Gaza as the Dune novels are related to the actual NASA space program.

== Published works ==
- The Aleppo Codex: A True Story of Obsession, Faith and the Pursuit of an Ancient Bible, 2012
- Pumpkinflowers: A Soldier's Story, 2016
- Spies of No Country: Secret Lives at the Birth of Israel, 2019
- Who by Fire: Leonard Cohen in the Sinai, 2022
- Out of the Sky: Heroism and Rebirth in Nazi Europe, 2026

== See also ==
- Media of Israel
