= Margaux Williamson =

Canadian artist (born 1976)

Margaux Williamson (born in 1976) is a Canadian painter, filmmaker, and writer based out of Toronto.

== Personal life ==
Williamson was born in 1976 in Pittsburgh, Pennsylvania, and lived in the United States for thirteen years. In 1989, she and her family moved to Waterloo, Ontario. After settling in Canada, Williamson was accepted into the BFA program at Queen's University in 1996 and graduated in 1999. In 1998, she spent one semester at the Glasgow School of Art, where she studied film. In 2000, Williamson moved to Toronto, where she currently resides with her son Billy.

=== Family life ===
Williamson's former partner is Misha Glouberman, who graduated from Harvard with a degree in philosophy. Notably, Glouberman has also collaborated with Williamson's friend and oft co-creator Sheila Heti. Glouberman and Heti worked together to create the novel The Chairs Are Where the People Go. In this collaboration piece Heti transcribed Glouberman's knowledge regarding communication and also edited the novel. They dedicated the book to Williamson.

== Professional life ==
=== Collaborations ===
==== Sheila Heti ====
Around 2006 Williamson found herself in a creative rut, and so she took a hiatus from painting and began a collaborative effort with Sheila Heti. From this friendship grew Williamson's film Teenager Hamlet and Heti's novel How Should a Person Be?. Heti's novel is a fictionalized representation of her relationship to Williamson, and features both women as the main characters. Williamson describes her experience of being fictionalized as transformative for how she thought about her own art, saying it made her realize that she could never present a full picture of herself through art. Also featured in the novel is "Misha", Williamson's long time partner.

Since 2006, the pair have worked together so frequently they decided to form a production company called "The Production Front", "so they could do things with other artists and call it one thing". For the release of Teenager Hamlet and How Should a Person Be? Williamson and Heti also partnered with Toronto band Tomboyfriend. The band contributed to the soundtrack of Teenager Hamlet, and participated in a joint premier of Teenager Hamlet, How Should a Person Be? and the release of the band's first album.

Williamson and Heti collaborated once again in 2012 on Williamson's project How to Act in the Real World as part of her residency at the Art Gallery of Ontario.

==== Tomboyfriend ====
At the end of her residency at the Art Gallery of Ontario, Williamson collaborated again with the band Tomboyfriend. Her final work for the residency was to create a video for one of Tomboyfriend's songs, "End of Poverty". The video was premiered alongside a performance by the band. This performance, and Williamson's other performative works, pushed the boundaries of the gallery and were somewhat different from regular exhibitions. The video that was shown was composed of YouTube videos and was described as "an uncomfortable, hilarious, and ultimately heartwarming compilation of teenagers dancing alone in their bedrooms and bathrooms".

==== Katharine Mulherin ====
Katharine Mulherin was the first individual who exhibited Williamson work in the 2000s. Over Williamson's career Katharine Mulherin has had a major influence on Williamson and has had a tremendous impact on the success of her career. Williamson has exhibited her works at many of Mulherin's galleries. When they first began working together, Mulherin tried to keep the prices of Williamson's art accessible, but there was an increasingly high demand for her work. Katherine Mulherin was described as the "woman who built Queen West, because Mulherin helped in converting a once run down area of the city into a thriving center for art and culture through creating galleries that exhibited many exciting artists."

== Career ==
=== Major works ===
==== Teenager Hamlet ====
One of the pieces Williamson worked on during her residency at the AGO was a film entitled Teenager Hamlet. The film recalls and reframes the narrative of Hamlet. With this work, Williamson constructed a fiction out of documentary footage consisting primarily of reality-based interviews and scenarios set up between her friends and neighbours. Williamson took on the role of director for this film, and in doing so she left the comfort zone of her studio and began an exploration into filmmaking. Williamson stated that she wanted to "become a woman of action" and this film can be understood as both an opportunity for her to do so, and also to explore what being a person of action truly meant. Notably, Williamson's close friends Sheila Heti and Sholem Krishtalka were featured in the film. The movie was produced by Julia Rosenberg of January Films, the photography and images were done by Lee Towndrow and the music was by Steve Kado. The film was first previewed at the Toronto International Film Festival in 2008. Later in 2010, there was a DVD version that was released with Canada's KRK Media. Additionally, in 2012 the Art Gallery of Ontario previewed a different version. A final screening happened in 2013 at Brooklyn's Union Docs.

==== "I Could See Everything" ====
In 2007, after major exhibitions in New York and Los Angeles Williamson decided to stop exhibiting her work in galleries in order to see "where the paintings would go when I gave them all the time in the world". In 2009, Williamson was the artist in residence at the Klondike Institute for Arts & Culture in the Yukon, which is where she first came up with the idea for her book "I Could See Everything". Rather than exhibiting her work in a real gallery, Williamson decided to publish an imaginary exhibit catalogue. The book represents an imagined exhibit, curated by Ann Marie Peña, at the imagined gallery the Road at the Top of the World Museum. The museum is supposedly located in Dawson City, Yukon, and the title was inspired by Alaska's Yukon Highway 9 or the "Top of the World Highway".

The book's title I Could See Everything refers to the limitations and opportunities provided by working in the extreme solitude of the Yukon: "I was picturing working away in the studio in the Yukon, seeing the world through the Internet, newspapers, books—trying to see what the world looked like in that way". This influence of popular culture can be seen in works such as I saw the whole universe (Scarlett Johansson in Versace). The "exhibition" included 46 paintings, most of which are oil on wood and featured "still lifes, heads, hands, torsos and prone figures". The book features five different "galleries" which all feature an accompanying essay by Williamson's friends, collaborators, and authors such as Leanne Shapton and Chris Kraus.

The process of creating this exhibit / book took Margaux five years. Finally, when the book was released in 2014 Williamson did her first gallery in nearly seven years. The exhibit, entitled I Could See Everything, was shown at Mulherin + Pollard in New York City's Lower East Side.

== Exhibitions ==
Date	Exhibitions
2001	World Without End – Art at the Union, Toronto
2002	Future in the Soft Fluorescent Haze-Katharine Mulherin Gallery, Toronto
2003	Drugs and the Riot – Katharine Mulherin Gallery, Toronto
2004	Important Canadian Art – ZieherSmith Gallery, New York
2004	Darby & the Angels – Katharine Mulherin Contemporary Art Projects, Toronto
2005	In The Woods – Katharine Mulherine Contemporary Art Projects – Toronto
2006	Scope Art Fair – Miami
2006	Painting to Moby Dick – Katharine Mulherin Contemporary Art Projects – Toronto
2007	The Girls Show Dostoyevsky the new darkness – Marvelli Gallery, New York
2007	Cement Garden – Marvelli Gallery, New York
2007	Second Nature – Fette's Gallery, Los Angeles
2007	Love/Hate, an exhibition of Toronto artists – Museum of Contemporary Canadian Art – Toronto
2021–2022	Interiors, solo show at the McMichael Gallery of Art
2021	she had a solo exhibit at White Cube gallery in London; the exhibit happened online due to the Coronavirus pandemic.
2022	Solo exhibition at White Cube gallery in Hong Kong
2025	Shoes, books, hands, buildings, and cars - Museum of Contemporary Art Toronto Canada

== Residencies ==
Williamson describes her work style as switching back and forth between "craving" isolation and "longstanding conversation with amazing people". She says she enjoys being far away from cultural centers because of the opportunity it provides for a big picture view of the interconnections between works across mediums. Williamson's residence in Toronto makes her already disconnected from the New York art scene, and she often takes this one step further by taking trips to the Yukon to work.

=== The Klondike Institute for Arts and Culture ===
Williamson did her first residency at the Klondike Institute for Arts & Culture in the Yukon in 2009. Her residency in the Yukon lasted just over a month, during which she conceived the idea for her book "I Could See Everything", although the final book did not come together for several years. In order to work on the paintings which were featured in the book Williamson moved to the Yukon for an extended period of time. After her residency, she again returned to the Yukon while she was working on her film "Teenager Hamlet". There, without a computer or real access to the outside world, she was able to rewrite and finalize the film's script.

=== Art Gallery of Ontario ===
Williamson was the second artist in residency at the Art Gallery of Ontario from January 2012 to March 2012. Williamson spent eight weeks in the Anne Lind Studio, where she studied and examined concepts including, "avoidance, conflict, compromise and the notion of establishing a sense of place". Williamson examined these four concepts through videos and painting. During her residency, one of the works Williamson created was "How to Act in Real Life" a new and still on-going performance art series. This work was a collaboration with Sheila Heti, it was a public and performance piece where Williamson instructed Heti on how "to act in the real world". Williamson and Heti would act out this performance in a circle like setting, which was open to the audience to join and interact in. Another piece of work Williamson showcased was a series of "real art of tv", called "Back to the World". The screening of this piece took place between 3pm and midnight. Williamson once again engaged with her audience, this time by inviting them to bring their own sleeping bags and pillows to the showing. Other programs Williamson developed during her residency were Teenager Hamlet, I'm a Very Sexy Baby and a performance by Tomboyfriend.

== Awards ==
In April 2013, Partners in Art won the MOCCA Award (Museum of Contemporary Canadian Art), it was a $25,000 prize. The award recognizes an individual's achievements in the visual art realm. Partner in Art, gave the money to the National Gallery of Canada, which went towards the Shary Boyle who was involved in the Venice Biennale 2013. To celebrate this Williamson along with two other artists, Luis Jacob and Suzy Lake were commissioned to produce short films that commemorated Partners in Art.

== Other accomplishments ==
In 2025, the National Gallery of Canada acquired Williamson's work Museum .
