= List of Canadian poets =

This is a list of Canadian poets.

== A ==
- Mark Abley (born 1955), poet, journalist, editor, and non-fiction writer
- Milton Acorn (1923–1986), poet, writer, and playwright
- José Acquelin (born 1956)
- Gil Adamson (born 1961), novelist, poet, and short-story writer
- Randell Adjei, spoken-word poet, first Poet Laureate of Ontario
- Hoda Adra
- Marie-Célie Agnant (born 1953), Haitian native living in Canada since 1970; novelist, poet and writer of children's books
- Neil Aitken (born 1974), poet, editor, and translator
- Kateri Akiwenzie-Damm (born 1965), Anishinaabe writer and poet from the Chippewas of Nawash First Nation, founder (in 1993) of Kegedonce Press, specializing in indigenous writers
- Donald Alarie (born 1945), writer, poet, and teacher
- Edna Alford (born 1947), editor, author, and poet who co-founded the magazine Dandelion
- Sandra Alland (born 1973), Scottish-Canadian writer, multimedia artist, bookseller, small press publisher, and activist
- Donna Allard, editor and poet
- Lillian Allen (born 1951), dub poet
- Anne-Marie Alonzo (1951–2005), playwright, poet, novelist, critic, and publisher, born in Egypt and moved to Canada at the age of 12
- George Amabile (born 1936)
- Madhur Anand (born 1971), poet and scientist
- James Anderson (1835-1922), poet and songwriter
- Marguerite Andersen (1924–2022), German-born, primarily francophone writer, academic and editor
- Patrick Anderson (1915–1979), English-born Canadian poet and academic
- Robert T. Anderson (1880–1960), Alberta poet
- Rod Anderson (1935–2014), poet, musician, and accountant
- Michael Andre (born 1946), poet, critic, and editor living in the United States
- Faith Arkorful
- Jeannette Armstrong (born 1948), Syilx Okanagan author, educator, artist, and activist
- Tammy Armstrong (born 1974), poet and novelist
- David Arnason (1940-2026), author and poet
- Joanne Arnott (born 1960), Métis poet, essayist, and activist writer
- Margaret Atwood (born 1939), poet, novelist, literary critic, feminist, and activist
- Gwen Aube
- Charlotte Aubin (born 1991)
- Martine Audet (born 1961)
- Emily Austin
- Oana Avasilichioaei, poet and translator
- Margaret Avison (1918–2007)

== B ==
- Ken Babstock (born 1970)
- Elizabeth Bachinsky (born 1976), poet and editor
- Britta Badour
- Alfred Bailey (1905–1997), poet, anthropologist, ethno-historian, and academic administrator
- Jacob Bailey (1731–1808), Church of England clergyman and poet born in the United States (colony of New Hampshire), immigrated to Nova Scotia, Canada in 1779
- Marie Annharte Baker (born 1942), Anishnabe poet and author
- Chris Banks (born 1970), poet and high school teacher
- Kaushalya Bannerji, Indian-born poet
- Frances Bannerman (1855–1944), painter and poet
- Simina Banu
- Joelle Barron
- John Barton (born 1957)
- Gary Barwin (born 1964), author, composer, children's writer, and poet
- Jalal Barzanji (born 1953), Kurdish poet and writer living in Canada since 1998
- Shaunt Basmajian (1950–1990), poet and author
- Angèle Bassolé-Ouédraogo (born 1967), Ivoirian-born poet and journalist
- Bill Bauer (1932–2010), American-born, living in Canada since 1965, husband of Nancy Bauer
- Nancy Bauer (born 1934), American-born, living in Canada since 1965, wife of Bill Bauer
- Doug Beardsley (born 1941), poet and academic
- Nérée Beauchemin (1850–1931), francophone poet and physician
- Derek Beaulieu (born 1973), poet, publisher, and anthologist
- Joseph-Isidore Bédard (1806–1833), poet, lawyer, and politician
- Ven Begamudré (born 1956), Indian-born poet, short-story writer, novelist, and academic
- Henry Beissel (1929–2025), poet, author, writer, and editor
- Billy-Ray Belcourt
- Ken Belford (1945–2020)
- Lesley Belleau
- Marlène Belley (born 1963),
- John Bemrose, arts journalist, novelist, poet, and playwright
- Gwen Benaway
- Roxanna Bennett
- Robbie Benoit (died 2007), poet and writer
- Jovette Bernier (1900–1981), Quebec poet, novelist, and journalist
- Jean-Philippe Bergeron (born 1978), francophone writer and poet
- Craven Langstroth Betts (1853–1941), author and poet
- Navtej Bharati, Indian-born poet and writer in Punjabi and English, publisher of Third Eye Press
- Bertrand Bickersteth
- Robert Billings (1949–1986), poet and editor
- Brandi Bird
- Earle Birney (1904–1995)
- Minnie Blanche Bishop (1864–1917), poet and educator
- Bill Bissett (born 1939)
- Mark Blagrave (born 1956), writer, short-story writer, playwright, poet, and academic
- Marie-Claire Blais (1939–2021), writer, poet, and playwright
- Cassandra Blanchard
- Robin Blaser (1925–2009), author and poet
- Laurie Block (1949–2018), poet and educator
- E. D. Blodgett (1935–2018), poet, literary critic, and translator
- Ali Blythe, poet and editor
- Selina Boan
- Robert Boates (born 1954)
- Christian Bök (born Christian Book 1966), poet and author
- Dennis E. Bolen (born 1953), novelist, journalist and poet
- Stephanie Bolster (born 1969), poet and academic
- Shane Book
- Roo Borson, pen name of Ruth Elizabeth Borson (born 1952), American native living in Canada
- Hédi Bouraoui (born 1932), Tunisian-born Canadian poet, novelist, and academic
- Arthur Bourinot (1893–1969), poet and lawyer
- George Bowering (born 1935), novelist, poet, historian, and biographer
- Marilyn Bowering (1949), poet, novelist, and playwright
- Tim Bowling (born 1964), poet and novelist
- Alex Boyd (born 1969), poet, fiction writer, critic, essayist, and editor
- Frances Boyle (born 1954)
- D. M. Bradford
- Kate Braid (born 1947), poet and teacher
- Lawrence Ytzhak Braithwaite (1963–2008), novelist, spoken word artist, dub poet, essayist, digital drummer, and short-story writer
- Shannon Bramer (born 1973), poet and teacher
- Dionne Brand (born 1953), poet, novelist, and non-fiction writer born and raised in Trinidad and Tobago before moving to Canada
- Di Brandt née "Diana Ruth Janzen" (born 1952), poet and literary critic
- Jacques Brault (1933–2022), French Canadian poet and translator
- Diana Brebner (1956–2001)
- Brian Brett (1950–2024), poet and novelist
- Elizabeth Brewster (1922–2012), poet and academic
- Robert Bringhurst (born 1946), poet, typographer, and author
- Eve Brodlique (1867–1949), poet, author, journalist
- David Bromige (1933–2009), Canadian poet living in the United States since 1962
- Nicole Brossard (born 1943), francophone poet and novelist
- Audrey Alexandra Brown (1904–1998)
- Ronnie R. Brown (born 1946), United States-born living in Canada for most of her adult life
- Colin Browne
- Charles Tory Bruce (1906–1971), poet, journalist and fiction writer
- Julie Bruck
- Suzanne Buffam
- April Bulmer (born 1963)
- Murdoch Burnett (1953–2015), poet, performance artist, editor, and community activist
- Mick Burrs (1940–2021)
- Aaron Bushkowsky (born 1957)
- Arthur de Bussières (1877–1913)
- Jake Byrne

== C ==
- Charmaine Cadeau
- Heather Cadsby, poet and publisher
- Alison Calder (born 1969), poet and academic
- Frank Oliver Call (1878–1956)
- Barry Callaghan (born 1937), author, poet, and son of the author Morley Callaghan
- Anne Cameron (1938–2022), novelist, poet, screenwriter, and short-story writer
- George Frederick Cameron (1854–1885), poet, lawyer, and journalist
- Jason Camlot (born 1967), poet, scholar, and songwriter
- Wilfred Campbell (1858–1918), poet and Anglican clergyman
- Natalee Caple (born 1970), novelist and poet
- Paul Cargnello (born 1979), Montreal poet, lyricist
- Bliss Carman (1861–1929), poet and critic
- Anne Carson (born 1950), poet, essayist, translator, and academic
- Kate Cayley, poet, writer, and theatre director
- Weyman Chan (born 1963), poet
- Catherine Chandler (born 1950), poet, translator, and academic
- William Chapman (1850–1917), poet, journalist, and bureaucrat
- Jean Charbonneau (1875–1960), francophone poet who was the primary founder of the Montreal Literary School
- Herménégilde Chiasson (born 1946), Acadian poet, playwright, journalist, academic, and the Lieutenant-Governor of New Brunswick
- Robert Choquette (1905–1991), novelist, poet, and briefly (1968–1970) a diplomat
- Lesley Choyce (born 1951), novelist, writer, children's book writer, poet, and academic who founded Pottersfield Press and hosts the television programs Choyce Words and Off the Page; born in the United States and immigrated to Canada in 1979
- Margaret Christakos (born 1962), poet and university writing teacher
- Evie Christie (born 1979), poet
- Jillian Christmas, poet
- Chuan Sha, Chinese-born Canadian poet and author
- Dave Clark, musician (Rheostatics) and poet
- George Elliott Clarke (born 1960), poet and playwright
- Wayne Clifford (1944–2025)
- Fred Cogswell (1917–2004)
- Leonard Cohen (1934–2016), singer-songwriter, musician, poet, and novelist
- Matt Cohen (1942–1999), writer and poet
- Victor Coleman (born 1944)
- Don Coles (1928–2017), poet, author, and academic
- Stephen Collis, poet and academic
- John Robert Colombo (born 1936), poet, anthologist, editor, essayist, and humorist
- Daria Colonna (born 1989)
- Anne Compton (born 1947), poet, critic, and anthologist
- Wayde Compton (born 1972), poet, writer, turntable-based "sound poetry" performer, academic who co-founded Commodore Books, the first black-oriented press in Western Canada
- Jan Conn (born 1952), Canadian-born geneticist and poet living in the United States
- Karen Connelly (born 1969), writer and poet
- Kevin Connolly (born 1962), poet, writer, and critic
- Dennis Cooley (born 1944), poet and academic
- Afua Cooper (born 1957), Jamaican-born historian and dub poet
- Judith Copithorne (1939–2025), concrete and visual poet
- Paulo da Costa, Canadian-Portuguese author, editor, and translator
- Sonia Cotten (born 1974), poet
- Maya Cousineau Mollen (born 1975)
- Dani Couture (born 1978), poet, essayist, critic, and journalist
- Thomas Cowherd (1817–1907), tinsmith and poet
- Isabella Valancy Crawford (1850–1887), poet, novelist, and short-story writer
- Octave Crémazie (1827–1879), francophone poet who has been called "the father of French-Canadian poetry" for his patriotic verse
- Lynn Crosbie (born 1963), poet and novelist
- Lorna Crozier (born 1948), writes under the name Lorna Uher
- Michael Crummey (born 1965), poet and writer
- Julie Crysler, journalist and poet
- Nancy Jo Cullen, poet and short story writer
- Jen Currin, United States-born poet
- Kayla Czaga (born 1989), poet

== D ==
- Cyril Dabydeen (born 1945), native Guyana poet and writer living in Canada
- Kalli Dakos (born 1950), children's poet and teacher
- Michel Dallaire (1957–2017), novelist and poet
- Mary Dalton (born 1950), poet and academic
- Joseph A. Dandurand, Native American poet, playwright, and archaeologist
- Jean-Paul Daoust (born 1946), poet
- Beverley Daurio (born 1953)
- Frank Davey (born 1940), poet and academic
- Lynn Davies (born 1954), poet
- Nicholas Flood Davin (1840–1901), lawyer, journalist, politician, and poet
- Tanya Davis, spoken-word poet and musician
- Tom Dawe (born 1940), writer, poet, children's book author, and artist
- Amber Dawn, poet, novelist, and short-fiction writer
- Adriana de Barros (born 1976), Portuguese native who moved to Canada at age 3; illustrator, web designer, and poet
- Sadiqa de Meijer (born 1966)
- James Deahl (born 1945), moved to Canada from the United States in 1970 and a citizen of both countries; poet, academic, and publisher of Unfinished Monument Press; founding member of the Canadian Poetry Association
- Kris Demeanor, poet, musician and actor
- Shawna Dempsey and Lorri Millan, performance art duo who have collaborated on performances, films, videos, publications, and public art projects since 1989
- Barry Dempster (1952–2025), poet and novelist
- Joe Denham, poet and fiction writer
- Adebe DeRango-Adem
- Michelle Desbarats, poet
- Anne-Marie Desmeules, poet
- Christopher Dewdney (born 1951), poet, writer, artist, creative-writing teacher, and writer-in-residence at various universities
- Ann Diamond (born 1951), an award-winning Montreal poet, novelist, and short-story writer
- Pier Giorgio Di Cicco (1949–2019), Italian-born, Canadian poet and priest
- Mary di Michele (born 1949), Italian-born Canadian poet, author, and creative-writing teacher
- Adam Dickinson, poet
- Robert Dickson (1944–2007), poet, translator, and academic
- Kildare Dobbs (1923–2013), Indian-born teacher, poet, editor, short-story writer, and travel writer who moved to Canada in 1950
- Jeramy Dodds (born 1974), poet
- Don Domanski (1950–2020)
- Magie Dominic (born 1944), poet and artist
- Jeffery Donaldson, poet and critic
- David Donnell (1939–2020), poet and writer
- Candas Dorsey (born 1952), poet and science fiction novelist
- Clive Doucet (born 1946), writer, poet, and politician
- Gordon Downie (1964–2017), songwriter, poet, and musician
- Orville Lloyd Douglas (born 1976), poet and writer
- Stan Dragland (1942–2022), novelist, poet and literary critic
- William Henry Drummond (1854–1907), Irish-born Canadian poet
- Louis Dudek (1918–2001), poet, literary critic and publisher
- Marilyn Dumont (born 1955), poet and educator
- Klara du Plessis, poet

== E ==
- Evelyn Eaton (1902–1983), novelist, short-story writer, poet, and academic
- Vic Elias (1948–2006), American-born, living in Canada from 1979, poet and academic
- David Elliott (1923–1999), poet and academic
- Rebecca Elson (1960–1999), Canadian-American astronomer, academic writer, and poet
- Crispin Elsted (born 1947)
- Karen Enns
- Reuben Epp (1920–2009), teacher, school administrator, writer and poet in Plautdietsch (Mennonite Low German)
- Michael Estok (1939–1989)

== F ==
- Margaret Fairley (1885–1968), English-born Canadian writer, educator and political activist
- Brian Fawcett (1944–2022), poet, novelist, nonfiction author and writer
- Charles Fenerty (c. 1821–1892), poet, journalist, and inventor; published two poems in book format in 1855 and 1866; wrote more than 32 poems (mostly published in local newspapers)
- Paola Ferrante
- Ferron, born Debby Foisy (1952), folk singer, songwriter and poet
- George Fetherling, wrote as "Doug Feathering" or "Douglas Fetherling" until 1999 when he began using his middle name (born 1949), American-born poet, novelist, journalist and essayist who moved to Canada at age 18 and became a Canadian citizen
- Connie Fife (1961–2017)
- Robert Finch (1900–1995), poet and academic whose area of expertise was French poetry
- Joan Finnigan (1925–2007), writer, poet, teacher and newspaper reporter
- Jon Paul Fiorentino (born 1975), poet, novelist, short-story writer, academic and editor of Matrix magazine
- Red Fisher (1914–2006), sporting goods retailer, radio and television personality, poet
- Judith Fitzgerald (1952–2015), poet and journalist
- Polly Fleck (1933–2019)
- Robert Ford (1915–1998), poet, translator and diplomat
- Raymond Fraser (1941–2018), novelist, poet, biographer, essayist and editor
- Louis-Honoré Fréchette (1839–1908), French Canadian poet, politician, playwright and short-story writer
- Pauline Fréchette (1889–1943), French Canadian poet, dramatist, journalist, and Catholic nun
- Patrick Friesen (born 1946), poet and university-level creative writing teacher
- Mark Frutkin (born 1948), American-born novelist and poet who moved to Canada in 1970 as a Vietnam War draft resister

== G ==
- Rhonda Ganz
- Keith Garebian (born 1943), critic, biographer, and poet; born in Bombay, India, and immigrated to Canada in 1961
- François-Xavier Garneau (1809–1866), French Canadian notary, poet, civil servant, and historian
- Hector de Saint-Denys Garneau (1912–1943), first modernist French Canadian poet
- Bill Gaston (born 1953), novelist, playwright, short-story writer, and poet
- Tea Gerbeza
- Antoine Gérin-Lajoie (1824–1882), French Canadian poet and novelist
- Marty Gervais (born 1946), poet, photographer, professor, journalist, and publisher of Black Moss Press
- Hollay Ghadery
- Chantal Gibson
- Elsa Gidlow (1898–1986)
- Angus Morrison Gidney (1803–1882), educator, poet, and journalist
- Gerry Gilbert (1936–2009)
- Charles Ignace Adélard Gill (1871–1918), painter and poet
- John Glassco (1909–1981), poet, memoirist, and novelist
- Jacques Godbout (born 1933), novelist, essayist, children's writer, journalist, filmmaker, and poet
- Gérald Godin (1938–1994), French Canadian poet and politician
- Oliver Goldsmith (1794–1861)
- Leona Gom (born 1946), novelist and poet
- Katherine L. Gordon
- Spencer Gordon, Toronto-based writer
- Phyllis Gotlieb (1926–2009), science fiction novelist and poet
- Nora Gould
- Susan Goyette (born 1964), poet and novelist
- Neile Graham (born 1958), poet and academic
- Alain Grandbois (1900–1975), French Canadian poet
- Hannah Green
- Richard Greene (born 1961)
- Leslie Greentree (born 1966), poet, short-story writer, and freelance writer
- Genni Gunn (born 1949), novelist, poet, and translator
- Kristjana Gunnars, Icelandic-Canadian poet and novelist
- Stephen Guppy (born 1969)
- Ralph Gustafson (1909–1995), poet and academic

== H ==
- Paul Haines (1933–2003), poet and jazz lyricist, born in the United States and later a Canadian resident
- Helen Hajnoczky (born 1985), visual poet
- Phil Hall (born 1953), poet, academic, and publisher of broadsides and chapbooks under the Flat Singles Press imprint since 1976
- Jane Eaton Hamilton (born 1954), short-story writer, poet, and photographer
- Jennica Harper
- Claire Harris (1937–2018)
- Michael Harris
- Richard Harrison
- Paul Hartal (born 1936), painter and poet, born in Hungary
- Jill Hartman (born 1974 in poetry), poet and editor
- Diana Hartog
- Elisabeth Harvor (née Deichman) (1936–2024), novelist and poet
- Robert Hayman (1575–1629), poet, colonist and Proprietary Governor of Bristol's Hope colony in Newfoundland
- Charles Heavysege (1816–1876)
- Anne Hébert (1916–2000), French-Canadian novelist and poet
- Wilfrid Heighington (1897–1945), soldier, writer, poet, lawyer, and politician
- Steven Heighton (1961–2022), novelist and poet
- David Helwig (1938–2018), poet, novelist, and essayist; father of Maggie Helwig
- Maggie Helwig (born 1961), poet, novelist, peace and human rights activist, Anglican priest at Church of St Stephen-in-the-Fields; daughter of David Helwig
- Anna Minerva Henderson (1887–1987), poet and civil servant
- Brian Henderson (born 1948), poet, academic, and editor
- Jason Heroux (born 1971), third poet laureate of Kingston, Ontario, born in Montreal
- Benjamin Hertwig
- Robert Hilles (born 1951), poet and novelist
- Robert Hogg (1942–2022)
- Susan Holbrook (born 1967), poet, poetry textbook author, playwright
- Clive Holden
- Norah M. Holland (1876–1925), poet, playwright, journalist, editor
- Matthew Hollett
- Nancy Holmes (born 1959)
- Cornelia Hoogland (born 1952), poet and academic
- Hilda Mary Hooke (1898–1978), poet and playwright
- Leah Horlick (born 1988)
- Sean Horlor (born 1981), poet, former speechwriter, freelance writing consultant
- Karen Houle
- Liz Howard
- Harry Howith (1934–2014)
- Ray Hsu, poet and academic
- David Huebert
- Annie Campbell Huestis (1878–1960), poet
- Helen Humphreys (born 1961), poet and novelist
- Al Hunter, poet, author, tribal leader, and activist
- Aislinn Hunter (born 1969), poet and author
- Bruce Hunter (born 1952), teacher, poet, fiction writer, and lifewriter
- Catherine Hunter (born 1957), poet, novelist, editor, academic, and critic
- Chris Hutchinson (born 1972)
- Douglas Smith Huyghue (1816–1891), Canadian and Australian poet, fiction writer, essayist, and artist
- Maureen Hynes (born 1948), poet

== I ==
- Susan Ioannou (born 1944)
- Doyali Islam (born 1984)
- Frances Itani (born 1942), novelist, short-story writer, poet, and essayist

== J ==
- Suzanne Jacob (born 1943), novelist, poet, playwright, singer-songwriter, and critic
- Maria Jacobs (born 1930), poet and publisher
- Edna Jaques (1891–1978), poet
- Jemeni (born 1976), actress, writer and activist
- E. A. Jenns (1860–1930), poet
- Paulette Jiles (1943–2025), American-born poet and novelist who moved to Canada in 1969
- Rita Joe (1932–2007), Mi'kmaq-Canadian poet and songwriter, called the "poet laureate of the Mi'kmaq people"
- E. Pauline Johnson (1861–1913), also known as "Tekahionwake" (1861–1913)
- Jim Johnstone (born 1978)
- D. G. Jones (1929–2016), poet, translator, and educator
- El Jones (born 1979), poet and activist
- Nathanael Jones
- Julie Joosten (born 1980)
- Clifton Joseph
- Eve Joseph (born 1953), poet and author

== K ==
- Surjeet Kalsey, poet, dramatist, short-story writer, and translator who writes in both Punjabi and English
- Smaro Kamboureli, poet and academic
- Donna Kane
- Adeena Karasick, poet and academic
- Rupi Kaur (born 1992), poet and illustrator
- Lionel Kearns (born 1937), poet and teacher
- Diane Keating
- Kaie Kellough (born 1975)
- M. T. Kelly (born 1946), novelist, poet, and playwright
- Penn Kemp, novelist, playwright, poet and sound poet
- Leo Kennedy (1907–2000), modernist poet, published in the 1930s
- Robert Kirkland Kernighan (1854–1926), poet, journalist, and farmer
- Roy Kiyooka (1926–1994), photographer, poet, and artist
- Barbara Klar
- Johann Peter Klassen (1868–1947), Russian Mennonite poet and writer who immigrated to Canada in 1923 and wrote primarily in German
- Sarah Klassen (born 1932), poet and fiction writer
- A. M. Klein (1909–1972), poet, journalist, novelist, and short-story writer
- Raymond Knister (1899–1932), novelist, short-story writer, poet, critic, and journalist
- Joy Kogawa (born 1935), poet and novelist
- Jules Arita Koostachin
- Maka Kotto (born 1961), Cameroon-born francophone Canadian, provincial level politician, former Canadian House of Commons member who published a book of poetry in 2002
- Shane Koyczan (born 1976), spoken word poet
- Robert Kroetsch (1927–2011), novelist, poet, non-fiction writer, and academic
- Aaron Kreuter
- Janice Kulyk Keefer (born 1952), novelist, poet, and academic

== L ==
- Kama La Mackerel
- Sonnet L'Abbé, poet and critic
- Marcel Labine (1948–2026), French Canadian poet and academic
- Pierre Labrie (born 1972), French Canadian poet
- Edward A. Lacey (1937–1995)
- Ben Ladouceur (born 1987)
- Chloé LaDuchesse
- Dany Laferrière (born 1953), Haitian-born francophone novelist, journalist, and poet who moved to Canada in 1976
- Annie Lafleur (born 1980)
- Larissa Lai (born 1967), poet, novelist, professor, critic
- Catherine Lalonde (born 1974), French Canadian poet and journalist
- Archibald Lampman (1861–1899)
- Tim Lander (1938–2023)
- Patrick Lane (1939–2019)
- M. Travis Lane (born 1934), American-born Canadian poet who moved to Canada in 1960
- Rina Lasnier (1915–1997), French Canadian poet and playwright
- Evelyn Lau (born 1971), poet and novelist
- Edythe Morahan de Lauzon
- Irving Layton (1912–2006)
- Georgette LeBlanc (born 1977)
- Gérald Leblanc (1947–2005), French Canadian poet, playwright, novelist, essayist, and writer
- Félix Leclerc (1914–1988), songwriter, musician, poet, novelist, actor, radio announcer, radio scriptwriter, and writer
- Dennis Lee (born 1939), poet, writer and children's fiction author
- John B. Lee (born 1951), author, poet, and academic
- Lily Alice Lefevre (1854–1938)
- Sylvia Legris (born 1960)
- John Lent (1948–2006), poet and novelist
- Douglas LePan (1914–1998), diplomat, poet, novelist, and academic
- Alex Leslie
- Lilian Leveridge (1879–1953), poet, short story writer, and non-fiction writer
- Katherine Leyton
- T. Liem
- Tim Lilburn (born 1950), poet and essayist
- Charles Lillard (1944–1997), poet and historian
- Dorothy Livesay (1909–1996)
- Billie Livingston (born 1965), novelist and poet
- Douglas Lochhead (1922–2011), poet, librarian, and academic
- Jennifer LoveGrove (born 1973)
- Pat Lowther (1935–1975)
- Laura Lush
- Richard Lush (born 1934)
- Michael Lynch (1944–1991)

== M ==
- Rozena Maart (born 1962), poet, short-story writer, novelist, playwright, academic, and psychotherapist; South African living in Canada
- Annick MacAskill
- Kathy Mac
- Karen Mac Cormack (born 1956), experimental poet born in Zambia, who holds dual British/Canadian citizenship, she has moved from Toronto to Buffalo, New York, with her husband, poet Steve McCaffery
- Dawn Macdonald
- Elizabeth Roberts MacDonald (1864–1922), poet, children's literature, short story writer and essayist
- Hugh MacDonald (born 1945), poet, children's writer and editor
- Wilson MacDonald (1880–1967)
- Gwendolyn MacEwen (1941–1987), novelist and poet
- Walter Scott MacFarlane (1896–1979), poet and soldier
- Tom MacInnes (1867–1951), poet and writer
- Andrea MacPherson, poet and novelist
- Jay Macpherson (13 June 1931 – 21 March 2012), poet and academic (a woman)*
- Keith Maillard (born 28 February 1942), author and poet
- Charles Mair (1838/1840–1927), poet and political activist
- Robert Majzels (born 1950), novelist, poet, playwright, and translator
- Alice Major, contemporary poet
- Kim Maltman (born 1951), poet and physicist (a man)
- Donato Mancini
- Eli Mandel (1922–1992), poet, essayist, and academic
- Ahdri Zhina Mandiela (born 1953), Jamaican-born dub poet, theatre producer, and artistic director; Jamaican native living in Canada
- David Manicom (born 1960), diplomat, poet, and novelist
- Lee Maracle (1950–2021), Native American poet and author
- Blaine Marchand
- Nicole Markotic, poet and novelist
- Daphne Marlatt, née Buckle (born 1942)
- Tom Marshall (1938–1993), poet and novelist
- Émile Martel (1941–2023)
- Garth Martens
- Camille Martin (born 1956), poet and collage artist
- Sid Marty (born 1944), poet, author, and musician
- Robin Mathews (1931–2023), poet and professor, known for his political activism in support of Canadian independence from U.S. domination
- Seymour Mayne (born 1944), poet and literary translator
- Micheline Maylor (born 1970), poet and academic
- Chandra Mayor (born 1973), poet and novelist
- Robert McBride (1811/1812–1895), Irish-born Canadian poet
- Steven McCabe (born 1949), contemporary artist and poet
- Steve McCaffery (born 1947), poet and academic born in England and moved to Toronto in 1968; husband of poet Karen MacCormack
- Julia McCarthy (1964–2021)
- Susan McCaslin (born 1947), poet and academic
- Alma Frances McCollum (1879–1906), poet and composer
- Kathleen McCracken
- John McCrae (1872–1918), poet, physician, author, artist, and soldier during World War I, and a surgeon during the battle of Ypres; best known for the war memorial poem In Flanders Fields
- Roy McDonald (1937–ca. 2018), poet and busker (street performer)
- David McFadden (11 October 1940 – 6 June 2018), poet, fiction writer, and travel writer
- David McGimpsey (born 1962), poet, humorist, and academic
- Robin McGrath (born 1949)
- Wendy McGrath, poet and novelist
- Nadine McInnis (born 1956), poet, short-story writer and essayist
- James McIntyre (1828–1906), called The Cheese Poet
- Don McKay (born 1942), poet editor and educator
- Archibald McKillop (1824–1905), called The Blind Bard of Megantic
- Barry McKinnon (1944–2023)
- Brendan McLeod (born 1979), poet novelist, member of The Fugitives
- Emily Julian McManus (1865–1918), poet, author, and educator
- Susan McMaster (born 1950), poet literary editor and spoken word performer
- Amber McMillan, poet and writer
- Eugene McNamara (1930–2016), poet, author and teacher
- Steve McOrmond (born 1971), poet and academic
- George McWhirter (born 1939), Irish-born poet, author, translator and educator
- Mary Melfi (born 1951), Italian-born poet novelist, and playwright who immigrated to Canada as a child
- Joshua Mensch
- Iman Mersal (born 1966), Egyptian-born Egyptian/Canadian poet and professor of Arabic literature
- Bruce Meyer (born 1957), poet and academic
- Shayne Michael
- Anne Michaels (born 1958), poet and novelist
- Pauline Michel (born 1944), novelist, poet, playwright, songwriter and screenwriter
- Marianne Micros
- Roy Miki (1942–2024), poet and academic
- Phebe Florence Miller (1889–1979), poet and diarist
- Kenneth G. Mills (1923–2004)
- Roswell George Mills
- Gaston Miron (1928–1996), French Canadian poet writer and editor
- Lucy Maud Montgomery (1874–1942), primarily an author, but also a poet from Prince Edward Island
- Marion E. Moodie (1867–1958), nurse, botanist, and poet
- Susanna Moodie (1803–1885), British-born Canadian author and poet
- Jacob McArthur Mooney (born 1983)
- Shani Mootoo (born 1957) Trinidadian Canadian writer, novelist and poet, and visual artist, living in Canada since 1981
- Pamela Mordecai (born 1942), Jamaican writer, teacher, scholar, and poet living in Canada since 1994
- Pierre Morency (born 1942), French Canadian writer, poet, and playwright
- Dwayne Morgan spoken word artist (born 1974), motivational speaker, event organizer, and poet
- Jeffrey Morgan (born 1954), primarily a writer, but with poetry published in Rolling Stone and Bakka Magazine
- Kim Morrissey (born 1955), poet and playwright
- Colin Morton (born 1948)
- A. F. Moritz (born 1947), poet and academic
- Garry Thomas Morse
- Daniel David Moses (1952–2020), Native American Canadian poet and playwright
- Erín Moure (born 1955)
- Jane Munro (born 1943)
- Sachiko Murakami
- William Murdoch (1823–1887), Scottish-Canadian poet, writer and gasworks manager who immigrated to Canada in 1854
- George Murray, poet and associate editor at Maisonneuve Magazine, contributing editor at several literary magazines
- Susan Musgrave (born 1951), poet and children's writer

== N ==
- Akhtar Naraghi
- André Narbonne
- Roger Nash (born 1942), English-born philosopher, poet, and academic
- Jim Nason, poet, fiction writer, caregiver, publisher
- Lyle Neff (born 1969), poet, journalist, essayist, and literary critic
- Lorri Neilsen Glenn, poet, ethnographer, essayist, and academic
- Émile Nelligan (1879–1941), francophone poet from Quebec
- Holly Nelson (2005–2006), writer, poet, activist, journalist, leader of the Green Party of Manitoba
- Pierre Nepveu (born 1946), French Canadian poet, novelist, and essayist
- W. H. New (born 1938), poet, editor, and literary critic
- John Newlove (1938–2003)
- bpNichol (1944–1988), born Barrie Phillip Nichol, who often went by his lower-case initials and last name, with no spaces, poet and writer
- Cecily Nicholson
- Emilia Nielsen
- Chad Norman
- Alden Nowlan (1933–1983), poet, novelist, playwright, and journalist

== O ==
- Patrick O'Connell (1944–2005)
- Alexandra Oliver
- Tolu Oloruntoba, poet and physician
- Sheree-Lee Olson (born 1954), novelist, poet, and journalist
- Michael Ondaatje (born 1943), Sri Lankan novelist and poet with Canadian citizenship
- Heather O'Neill, novelist, poet, short-story writer, screenwriter, and journalist
- Gabriel Osson
- Fernand Ouellette (1930–2026)
- Madeleine Ouellette-Michalska (born 1930), French-Canadian writer, novelist, essayist, and poet
- Richard Outram (1930–2005), poet and writer; co-founder with his wife, Barbara Howard, of the Gauntlet Press
- Catherine Owen, poet and musician

== P ==
- Susan Paddon
- P. K. Page (1916–2010)
- Corrado Paina (1954–2024), Italian poet living in Canada since 1987, editorial director of the quarterly magazine ItalyCanada Trade
- Arleen Paré
- Fawn Parker
- Lisa Pasold
- John Pass (born 1947), English-born Canadian poet and academic who has lived in Canada since 1953; married to poet and novelist Theresa Kishkan
- Philip Kevin Paul
- Amy Parkinson (1855–1938), English-born Canadian poet
- Neil Peart (1952–2020), musician, songwriter, producer, author, and drummer of the Canadian Rock band Rush
- Soraya Peerbaye
- Marc Perez
- Bradley Peters
- W. T. Pfefferle, poet, writer, and academic
- Anthony Phelps (1928–2025)
- M. NourbeSe Philip (born 1947), poet, novelist, playwright, essayist, and short-story writer
- Alison Pick, poet and novelist
- Leah Lakshmi Piepzna-Samarasinha (born 1975), American-born poet, spoken-word poet, writer, educator, and social activist living in Canada
- Jean-Guy Pilon (1930–2021), French Canadian poet
- Sarah Pinder
- George Pirie (1799–1870), newspaper publisher and poet
- Alycia Pirmohamed
- Al Pittman (1940–2001), poet and playwright
- Michel Pleau (born 1964)
- Emily Pohl-Weary, novelist, poet, and magazine editor
- Craig Poile
- Laurent Poliquin (born 1975), French Canadian poet and academic
- Sandy Pool (born 1981)
- Joël Pourbaix (born 1958)
- B. W. Powe (born 1955), author, poet, and academic
- Claire Pratt (1921–1995), artist, poet, and editor; daughter of writer and editor Viola Whitney and E. J. Pratt, a poet and academic
- E. J. Pratt (1882–1964), poet and academic
- Frank Prewett (1893–1962), poet and broadcaster, who spent most of his life in the United Kingdom; a war poet of World War I
- Robert Priest (born 1951), poet and children's author
- Stefan Psenak (born 1969), French Canadian poet, playwright, and novelist
- Al Purdy (1918–2000), writer, editor, and poet

== Q ==
- Andy Quan (born 1969), author who moved to Australia
- Marion Quednau
- Joseph Quesnel (1746–1809), French Canadian composer, poet, and playwright
- Sina Queyras, poet and academic

== R ==
- Kenneth Radu
- Gurcharan Rampuri (1929–2018), poet of Punjabi descent who writes in the Punjabi language
- Theodore Harding Rand (1835–1900), educator and poet
- Ian Iqbal Rashid (born 1971), Canadian/British Muslim poet, screenwriter, and filmmaker of Indian descent; has lived primarily in London
- Angela Rawlings (a.k.a. a.rawlings, born 1978)
- James Reaney (1926–2008), poet, playwright, and literary critic
- Michael Redhill (born 1966), American-born Canadian poet, playwright, and novelist
- Beatrice Redpath (1886–1937), poet and short story writer
- D. C. Reid (born 1952), poet, novelist, and short-story writer
- Jamie Reid (1941–2015)
- Tiana Reid
- Shane Rhodes
- Robin Richardson (born 1985)
- Lisa Richter (born c. 1977), poet, winner of the 2020 (U.S.) National Jewish Book Award for poetry
- Emily Riddle
- Sandra Ridley
- Charles G.D. Roberts (1860–1943), poet and prose writer; called the "father of Canadian poetry" for his influence on other poets
- Lisa Robertson (born 1961), poet, essayist, and writer
- Matt Robinson (born 1974)
- Ajmer Rode (born 1940), poet, playwright, and writer in Punjabi and English
- Gordon Rodgers (born 1952), poet, novelist, and clinical psychologist
- Carmen Rodríguez (born 1948), Chilean-Canadian author, poet, educator, political social activist, co-founder of Aquelarre Magazine; exiled from Chile after the 1973 coup; writes in both Spanish and English and translates her own work
- Janet Marie Rogers, Mohawk First Nations poet
- Linda Rogers (born 1944), poet and children's writer
- Julie Roorda
- Rachel Rose (born 1970), poet, essayist and short story writer
- Joe Rosenblatt (1933–2019), Governor General's Award-winning experimentalist
- Laisha Rosnau (born 1972), novelist and poet
- Bruce Ross, poet, author, academic, and past president of the Haiku Society of America
- Stuart Ross (born 1959), writer, poet, editor, and creative-writing instructor
- W.W.E. Ross (1894–1966), imagist poet of the 1920s and 1930s, has been called "Canada's first modern poet"
- Annie Rothwell (1837–1927), writer of paeans to colonial forces during the North-West Rebellion and other imperial wars; known among contemporary critics mainly as a war poet
- Nancy-Gay Rotstein
- Stephen Rowe (born 1980)
- André Roy (born 1944)

== S ==
- Lake Sagaris (born 1956), journalist, poet, and translator living in Chile
- Rodney Saint-Éloi
- Denis St-Jules (1950–2024)
- Renée Sarojini Saklikar
- Trish Salah, academic, writer, and poet whose first volume of poetry appeared in 2002
- Rebecca Salazar
- Peter Sanger (born 1943), poet and prose writer, critic, editor, and academic born in England, immigrated to Canada in 1953
- Charles Sangster (1822–1893)
- Robyn Sarah (born 1949)
- Félix-Antoine Savard (1896–1982), priest, academic, poet, novelist, and folklorist
- Jacob Scheier (born 1980), poet whose first collection of verses won the 2008 Governor General's Award for English poetry, editor, son of Libby Scheier, lives in New York City
- Libby Scheier (1946–2000), United States-born poet and short-story writer who moved to Canada in 1975, mother of Jacob Scheier
- Andreas Schroeder (born 1946), German-born poet, novelist, and nonfiction writer
- Stephen Scobie (born 1943), poet, critic, and academic
- Gregory Scofield (born 1966)
- Duncan Campbell Scott (1862–1947), poet and writer
- F. R. Scott, also known as Frank Scott (1899–1985), poet, intellectual and constitutional expert
- Jordan Scott (born 1978)
- Peter Dale Scott (born 1929), poet and academic
- Olive Senior (born 1941), Jamaican poet and short-story writer living in Canada
- Robert W. Service (1874–1958), poet and writer
- Kathy Shaidle (born 1964), author, columnist, and poet
- Francis Sherman (1871–1926)
- Joseph Sherman (1945–2006), poet and visual arts editor
- Carol Shields (1935–2003), American-born Canadian novelist, short-story writer, poet, playwright, and writer
- Trish Shields, poet and novelist
- Ann Shin
- Sandy Shreve (born 1950), poet, newspaper reporter, and office worker
- Melanie Siebert
- Goran Simic (1952–2024), Bosnian-born poet, playwright, and short-story writer living in Canada since 1995
- Bren Simmers
- Anne Simpson (born 1956), poet and novelist
- jaye simpson
- Bardia Sinaee
- Sue Sinclair (born 1972)
- Jaspreet Singh
- Éléonore Sioui (1920–2006), poet, healer, and activist
- George Sipos
- Sonja Skarstedt (born 1960), poet, short-story writer, playwright, painter, and illustrator who founded and edited the now-defunct literary magazine Zymergy (1987–1991), and founded Empyreal Press in 1990
- Robin Skelton, sometimes wrote under the pseudonym "Georges Zuk", a purported French surrealist (1925–1997), British-born Canadian academic, writer, poet, translator, and anthologist who immigrated to Canada in 1963; a founder and editor of The Mahalat Review
- Daniel Sloate (1931–2009), translator, poet, playwright, and academic
- Carolyn Smart (born 1952), English-born poet, author and academic
- Elizabeth Smart (1913–1986), poet and novelist whose book, By Grand Central Station I Sat Down and Wept, detailed her romance with English poet George Barker
- A. J. M. Smith (1902–1980), poet and academic
- Clara Kathleen Smith (1911–2004), poet and educator
- Douglas Burnet Smith (born 1949)
- John Smith (1927–2018), poet and academic
- Michael V. Smith (born 1973), novelist, poet and filmmaker
- Ron Smith (born 1943), poet, author, editor, playwright, and former academic; founder and co-publisher of Oolichan Books in 1984; influential in the founding of Theytus Books in 1971
- Steven Ross Smith (born 1945), poet, arts journalist, Poet Laureate of Banff, previous director of Literary Arts, Banff Centre
- Karen Solie (born 1966)
- Misha Solomon
- David Solway (born 1941), poet, educational theorist, travel writer, and literary critic
- Madeline Sonik (born 1960), novelist, short-story writer, children's-book author, editor, and poet
- Carolyn Marie Souaid (born 1959), poet and editor, living in Montreal, co-founder of Poetry Quebec magazine
- Raymond Souster (1921–2012), Toronto poet
- Esta Spalding (born 1966), American-born Canadian author, screenwriter, and poet
- Heather Spears (1934–2021), poet, novelist, and artist living in Denmark since 1962
- Dorothy Sproule (1867-1963), poet
- Birk Sproxton (1943–2007), poet and novelist
- George Stanley, American-born poet and academic associated with the San Francisco Renaissance in his early years, moved to Canada in the 1970s; associated with New Star Books and the Capilano Review
- Carmine Starnino, essayist, educator, and editor
- Jason Stefanik
- John Steffler (born 1947), poet and novelist
- Ian Stephens (died 1996), journalist, musician, and poet associated with the spoken word movement
- Ricardo Sternberg (born 1948), poet born in Brazil, educated in the United States
- Richard Stevenson (1952–2023)
- Shannon Stewart
- W. Gregory Stewart (born 1950), poet, science fiction author, short-story writer who works at a public utility and lives in Los Angeles, California
- John Stiles (born 1966), poet living in London, United Kingdom
- Anne Stone, poet, writer, and performance artist
- Betsy Struthers (born 1951), poet and novelist
- Andrew Suknaski (1942–2012), Saskatchewan poet
- Alan Sullivan (1868–1947), poet, short-story writer, railroad surveyor, and mining engineer
- Rosemary Sullivan (born 1947), poet, biographer, academic, and anthologist
- Moez Surani (born 1979), poet
- John Sutherland (1919–1956), poet, literary critic, and magazine editor who founded and edited First Statement in 1942 and its successor publication, Northern Review in 1945
- Robert Swanson (1905–1994)
- Robert Sward (1933–2022), American and Canadian poet and novelist
- George Swede (born 1940), Latvian-born Canadian children's writer and poet who writes haiku in English
- Todd Swift (born 1966), poet, editor, and academic living in the United Kingdom
- Anne Szumigalski (1922–1999)

== T ==
- Proma Tagore
- Bruce Taylor (born 1960)
- Heather Taylor (born 1977), poet, playwright, and teacher living in England since 2002
- Ruth Taylor (1961–2006), poet, editor, and academic
- Alex Tétreault (born 1994)
- John Terpstra, poet and carpenter
- Souvankham Thammavongsa, poet and short story writer
- Sharon Thesen (born 1946), poet and academic
- Alex Thibodeau
- Serge Patrice Thibodeau (born 1959)
- Kai Cheng Thom (born 1991)
- Edward William Thomson (1849–1924), journalist, writer, and poet
- John Thompson (1938–1976)
- Russell Thornton, poet
- Matthew Tierney (born 1970)
- Jose Tlatelpas (born 1953), Mexican native and Canadian resident; Native cultures poet, publisher, and political activist
- Mohamud Siad Togane (born 1947), Somali native and Canadian resident; poet, academic, and political activist
- Sarah Tolmie
- Lola Lemire Tostevin (born 1937), poet, novelist, and writer
- Michaël Trahan (born 1984), poet
- Kim Trainor, Vancouver poet
- Barbara Tran
- Rhea Tregebov (born 1953), poet and children's writer
- Raymond D. Tremblay (born 1944), poet, writer, social services agency official
- Roland Michel Tremblay (born 1972), French-Canadian author, poet, scriptwriter, development producer, and science-fiction consultant who moved to London, England in 1995
- Tony Tremblay (born 1968), French-Canadian poet, writer, spoken word artist, journalist, and radio personality
- Peter Trower (1930–2017), poet and novelist
- Mark Truscott (born 1970), born in the United States
- Élise Turcotte (born 26 June 1957), French-Canadian writer and poet
- Arielle Twist
- John Tyndall (born 1951)
- Daniel Scott Tysdal (born 1978)

== U ==
- Marie Uguay (1955–1981), French-Canadian poet
- Chimwemwe Undi
- Priscila Uppal (born 1974), poet and novelist
- David UU (David W. Harris) (1948–1994), visual poet

== V ==
- Léonise Valois (1868–1936), first French Canadian woman to publish a collection of poetry
- Peter van Toorn (1944–2021)
- R. M. Vaughan (1965–2020), poet, novelist, and playwright
- Paul Vermeersch (born 1973), poet and educator
- Katherena Vermette (born 1977)
- Gilles Vigneault (born 1928), Quebec poet, publisher, and singer-songwriter; Quebec nationalist and sovereigntist
- Pamelia Sarah Vining (1826–1897)
- Garth Von Buchholz (also G.A. Buchholz), British Columbia poet, dark fiction author, playwright, journalist, and arts critic
- Prvoslav Vujčić (born 1960)

== W ==
- Miriam Waddington (née Dworkin 1917–2004), poet, short-story writer, and translator
- Michael Wade (1944–2004)
- Fred Wah (born 1939), poet, novelist, and scholar
- Bronwen Wallace (1945–1989), poet and short-story writer
- Tom Walmsley (1948–2025), playwright, novelist, poet, and screenwriter
- Agnes Walsh (born 1950), actor, poet, playwright, and storyteller
- Matthew Walsh
- David Waltner-Toews (born 1948), epidemiologist, essayist, poet, fiction writer, veterinarian, and a specialist in the epidemiology of food and waterborne diseases, zoonoses, and ecosystem health
- Terry Watada, author, writer, and poet
- Alison Watt (born 1957), writer, poet, and painter
- Tom Wayman (born 1945), poet and academic
- Phyllis Webb (1927–2021), poet and radio broadcaster
- John Weier (born 1949)
- Matthew James Weigel
- Robert Stanley Weir (1856–1926), judge and poet most famous for writing the English lyrics to O Canada, the national anthem of Canada
- Zachariah Wells (born 1976), poet, critic, essayist, and editor
- Darren Wershler-Henry (born 1966), experimental poet, non-fiction writer, and cultural critic
- David Wevill (born 1935)
- George Whalley (1915–1983)
- Dawud Wharnsby (born 1972), singer-songwriter, poet, performer, educator, and television personality
- Michael Whelan (1858–1937), teacher, bookkeeper, and poet
- Joshua Whitehead
- Bruce Whiteman (born 1952), poet, writer, scholar, and essayist
- Isabella Whiteford (1835–1905), poet who also writes under the name Caed Mille Failtha
- Zoe Whittall (born 1976), poet and novelist
- Anne Wilkinson (1910–1961), poet, writer, and essayist
- Alan R. Wilson
- Anne Elizabeth Wilson (1901–1946), poet, writer, editor
- Sheri-D Wilson, poet and playwright
- Rob Winger, poet and academic
- Theresa Wolfwood, political activist and poet
- George Woodcock (1912–1995), poet, essayist, critic, biographer, and historian; the founder (in 1959) of the journal Canadian Literature
- Patrick Woodcock (born 1968), writer and poet
- Lance Woolaver (born 1948), author, poet, playwright, and director

== Y ==
- Isa Hasan al-Yasiri (born 1942), Iraqi-Canadian poet
- J. Michael Yates (1938–2019), poet and dramatist
- Leo Yerxa
- Jean Yoon (born 1962), actor, poet, and playwright
- D'bi Young, born in Jamaica, moved to Canada in 1993; dub poet, actor, and playwright
- Ian Young (born 1945)
- Josée Yvon (1950–1994)

== Z ==
- A. Light Zachary
- Robert Zend (1929–1985), Hungarian-Canadian poet, fiction writer, and multi-media artist
- David Zieroth (born 1946)
- Rachel Zolf (born 1968), poet and editor
- Daniel Zomparelli (born 1985)
- Carolyn Zonailo (born 1947), poet and publisher
- Jan Zwicky (born 1955), philosopher, poet, essayist, and violinist

== See also ==
- Lists of Canadian writers
- List of poets
- List of poetry awards
- List of years in poetry
- List of years in literature
