= Eric Orchard =

Canadian illustrator and cartoonist

- Areas: Toronto, Halifax
- Notable works: The Terrible, Horrible, Smelly Pirate; Anything but Hank; Maddy Kettle: The Adventure of the Thimblewitch; Bera the One Headed Troll
- Awards: Spectrum 17 Award; Atlantic Book Awards Shortlist 2009; Atlantic Book Awards Shortlist 2008

Eric Orchard is a Canadian illustrator and cartoonist. He grew up in Halifax, Nova Scotia where he began illustrating stories while still in grade school. Orchard studied painting and art history at the Nova Scotia College of Art and Design. He has illustrated three critically acclaimed children's books and has been twice nominated for the Atlantic Book Awards' Lillian Shepherd Memorial Award (for Excellence in Illustration) for his work on A Forest for Christmas (2008) and The Terrible, Horrible, Smelly Pirate (2009). In 2008, he was among the select artists chosen to contribute to The Totoro Forest Project charity art auction. In 2010, his work was showcased in The Society of Illustrators annual exhibit and he was featured in the Spectrum Annual of Fantastic Art. Orchard was awarded silver in the comics category in Spectrum 17. His art has also appeared in GUD Magazine

== Bibliography ==
- Broken Social Scene Presents: You Forgot It In People, written by Lonnie Nadler, Justin Peroff, Brendan Canning, Z2 Comics (2025) ISBN 979-8886560510
- Bera the One-Headed Troll, First Second (2016), ISBN 978-1626728745
- Maddy Kettle: The Adventure of the Thimblewitch, Top Shelf Productions (2014), ISBN 978-1603090728
- The Terrible, Horrible, Smelly Pirate written by Carrie Muller, Jacqueline Halsey, Nimbus Publishing, ISBN 1-55109-655-2
- Anything but Hank written by Rachel Lebowitz and Zachariah Wells, Biblioasis, ISBN 1-897231-36-9
- A Forest for Christmas written by Michael Harris, Nimbus Publishing, ISBN 1-55109-589-0
