= Catherine Gordon =

Catherine or Katherine Gordon may refer to:

- Lady Catherine Gordon (c. 1474–1537), Scottish noblewoman who became a lady-in-waiting in England
- Catherine Gordon (c. 1725–1779), daughter of William Gordon, 2nd Earl of Aberdeen
- Catherine Gordon (fl. 1770–1811), mother of the poet George Gordon Byron, 6th Baron Byron, usually known as Lord Byron
- Katherine C. Gordon (1917–2011), American astronomer
- Katherine L. Gordon, Canadian poet
- Cathy Gordon Brown (born 1965), American politician

== See also ==
- Kate Gordon (disambiguation)
