= Existere =

Canadian literary magazine

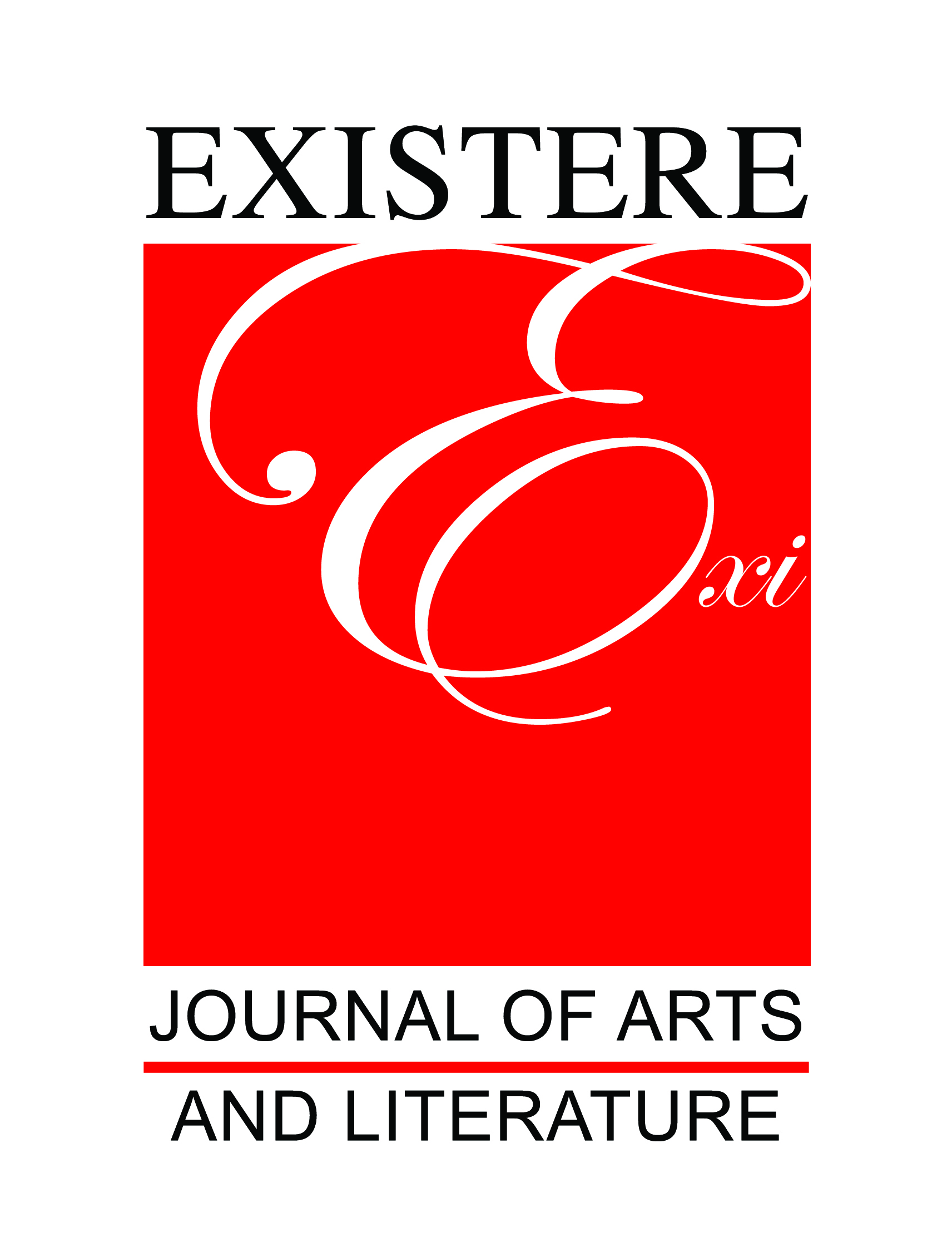
- Categories: Arts and Literature
- Frequency: Semi-annual
- Circulation: Digital
- Publisher: York University Professional Writing Program
- First issue: October 1978
- Country: Canada
- Based in: Writing Department at York University, Toronto, Ontario
- Language: English. Others on occasion.
- Website: 'Existere'
- ISSN: 1710-386X

Existere - Journal of Arts & Literature is a Canadian magazine that publishes twice a year through York University's Writing Department in Toronto, Ontario, Canada. The magazine publishes poetry, short stories, articles, book reviews, essays, interviews, art, photography from contributors around the world.

== History and affiliation ==
The journal was established at York University's Vanier College and was funded by Vanier College Council from its founding in 1978 to 2019. It was originally published as a quarterly, but since 2007 has published bi-annually. In 2018 it moved to Founders College and is now operated and published by the York University Professional Writing Program in the Writing Department, first through funding from the Office of the Dean of Liberal Arts & Professional Studies, and now through the generous donation of our readers and contributors.

Existere has appeared in many shapes and forms since its conception in 1978, but has ultimately retained a 6x9” format since Edward Fenner revived it in 2007, and presents anywhere from 80 to 100 pages, with full-colour covers. The journal is currently published only in digital format, with both full-colour covers and visual art submissions.

=== Archive ===
Every issue of Existere from 1980 to date can be found at York University's Scott Library in Toronto, Ontario, Canada.

=== Call For Back Issues ===
Existere is on a campaign to recover information and back issues lost to the mists of time and unfortunate housekeeping.

== Noteworthy Contributors ==
Noteworthy writers and poets that have appeared on Existere pages or who have edited the journal:

=== Canadian ===
- Adebe D.A. (Canadian poet, former Junior Poet Laureate for the City of Toronto, 2010 Dylan Thomas Prize long-list nominee, and past editor of Existere)
- Barry Dempster (Canadian poet and novelist based in Holland Landing, Ontario)
- Carole Glasser Langille (American-born Canadian poet and writer in Atlantic Canada). She was nominated for the Governor General's Award in 1997.
- David Lomax (Scottish-born Canadian novelist, educator and past editor of Existere based in Toronto, Ontario) Winner of the East York/Scarborough Reading Association's 2006 Reader of the Year Award.
- Barrie P. Nichol (late Canadian poet, concrete poet, teacher, and writer in many genres). His poem "Lament" appeared in Existere in 1982.
- Michael Redhill (American-born Canadian poet, playwright, current publisher and editor of Brick, A Literary Journal in Canada, and 2007 Man Booker Prize longlisted novelist)
- Jacob Scheier (Canadian poet and winner of the 2008 Governor General's Award for English poetry)
- Susan Swan (Canadian author and now retired professor at York University in Toronto)
- Priscila Uppal (Canadian poet, novelist, and professor of literature and creative writing at York University in Toronto)
- Myna Wallin (Canadian poet, prose writer, radio host, and poetry editor for Tightrope Books)
- Zachariah Wells (Canadian poet, anthologist, editor, critic). His poems "Starfish Song," "Atum", and "In Praise of the African Naked Mole Rat" appeared in 2006.

=== International ===
- Oliver Rice (American poet and winner of the Theodore Roethke Prize in 1998)
