= Daurio =

Daurio is a surname. Notable people with the surname include:

- Beverley Daurio (born 1953), Canadian writer and editor
- Ken Daurio (born c. 1971), American screenwriter

== See also ==
- Dario
