= Donna Allard =

Canadian poet and writer

- Occupation: Poet

Donna Allard is a Canadian poet and writer. From 2000 to 2011, she served as Atlantic representative, national coordinator and president of the Canadian Poetry Association and was on its board of directors. She was president of the executive board of the Canadian Poetry Association from 2005–2011, and is a founder of the Sojourner Literary Festival and co-founder of the Canadian Poets Guild (2016). She was also a founder of the National Milton Acorn Festival, where she served for eight years. She was named National Beat Poet Laureate in 2020. She lives in Richibucto, New Brunswick.

== Early life ==
Allard is from the fishing village of Richibucto, New Brunswick. Her first published poem was "Friends", which she wrote in 1972 for the FHS Yearbook. Her first poetry performance was in 1988 at the National Milton Acorn Festival. She has performed with poets including bill bissett, John B. Lee, Robert Priest, Nicole Brossard, Joseph Sherman, Fred Stenson and Rita Joe.

== Published works ==
- 1998:Postal Code I
- 2001:No Love Lost II
- 2001:Poetea For Six
- 2002:Oral Victory
- 2002:Time of Trial: Beyond the Terror of 9/11
- 2003:Handprints For The Future
- 2006:Bellwalker
- 2006:Hand Upon the Dunes
- 2006:Minago Streets
- 2012:From Shore To Shoormal
- 2019:Three Times Around the World, Coldfire, Ghost in the Window

== See also ==
- Canadian literature
- Canadian poetry
- List of Canadian poets
