= Rodney Anderson =

Rodney Anderson may refer to:

- Rodney Anderson (American football) (born 1996), American football player
- Rodney Anderson (Wyoming politician) (1931–2025), American politician in the state of Wyoming
- Rodney Anderson (Texas politician), American politician in the state of Texas
- Rod Anderson (writer) (Rodney J. Anderson, 1935–2014), Canadian poet and musician

== See also ==
- Rod Anderson, Australian racing driver
