= Frontenac House =

Canadian publishing company

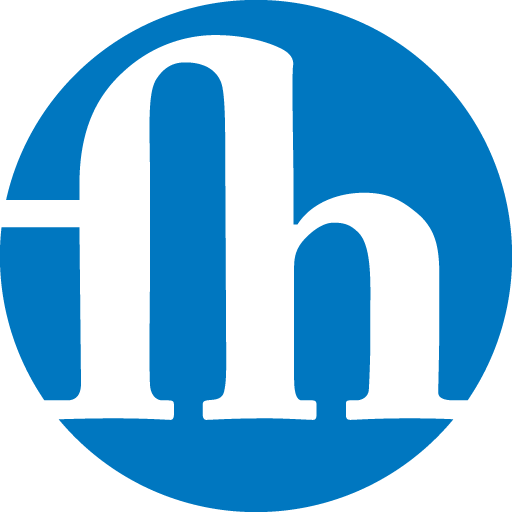
- Founded: 2000
- Founder: Rose and David Scollard
- Country of origin: Canada
- Headquarters location: Okotoks, Alberta
- Key people: Neil Petrunia, Terry Davies (Owners). Micheline Maylor, John Wall Barger (Editors).
- Imprints: Frontenac House Poetry
- Official website: https://www.frontenachouse.com/

Frontenac House is an independent publishing house located in Okotoks, Alberta, Canada, founded in 2000 by Rose and David Scollard. The publishing house focuses on poetry, but has reached into other genres as well, including fiction, photography, Children/YA books, and non-fiction. Since its founding in 2000, the press has published over 120 original titles.

== Poetry ==
Frontenac's first publication was a YA novel, The Grass Beyond the Door, by Cicely Veighey. Frontenac then focused on their prime area of interest--Canadian poetry—which began with the "Quartet 2001 of four poetry books." Each year since then, the company has published a set of four Quartet poetry titles. In 2010, to celebrate 10 years of activity, Frontenac published a Dektet of 10 titles. Since 2021, Frontenac House has also released titles in the spring of each year, publishing authors such as Barry Dempster, Natalie Meisner, and Keith Garebian with this expansion.

Frontenac House has been recognized for its contribution to Alberta publishing, winning Alberta Publisher of the Year in 2006, as well as the BPAA Robert Kroetsch Award of Poetry as recently as 2021 for work on Lisa Richter’s Nautilus and Bone. Local magazine Alberta Views has also noted Frontenac's role as an important Canadian poetry publisher.

== Diversity ==
Frontenac has deliberately pursued diversity among its writers in subject matter, writing technique, gender orientation, and social and political attitudes. Geographically, the company has published a relatively high number of Alberta-based poets, but has also produced books by writers living in British Columbia, Saskatchewan, Ontario, and as far afield as San Francisco and Paris. Attention is given to developing new and previously unpublished writers, although writers who had already received high levels of recognition for their work have also been included on the list.

== Titles ==
In recent years, Frontenac House has expanded their mandate beyond poetry to publish art books, aviation history, and political satire. Some of the recent titles published by Frontenac House include:

- This Was Our Valley by Shirlee Smith Matheson and Earl K. Pollon, a history of the W.A.C. Bennett Dam that went online in 1967 and subsequently started the erosion of the banks, loss of forestry, and damage to fish and wildlife habitats – effects that continue to be experienced. This Was Our Valley was the Winner of the Alberta Culture Non-Fiction Book Award.
- A Brush With Depth by Rick Sealock and Christina Vester featuring wild and wacky illustrations for Sealock's clients as varied as Rolling Stone, Texas Monthly, The Washington Post, Natural Health Magazine, and GQ Magazine. The book Won the 2021 BPAA Book Illustration Award.
- Borderlands by Mark Vitaris, a photographic discourse on the country that straddles the forty-ninth parallel from the eastern slopes of the Rocky Mountains to the grasslands of Saskatchewan and to the western Dakotas. Borderlands won the BPAA Regional Book of the Year Award in 2021, and was a Finalist for the High Plains Book Award - Art & Photography that same year.
- This Wound is a World by Billy-Ray Belcourt—a call to turn to love and sex to understand how Indigenous peoples shoulder sadness and pain like theirs without giving up on the future. This Wound is a World won the 2018 Griffin Poetry Prize and was shortlisted for the Gerald Lampert Award and the Governor General Award for Poetry in the same year.

== Authors ==
Frontenac has published authors including Leslie Greentree, Shirlee Smith Matheson, Micheline Maylor, Billy-Ray Belcourt, and founder of the Calgary International Spoken Word Festival, Sheri-D Wilson.

== Executive ==
Owner and Publisher, Neil Petrunia, has a degree in Creative Writing from York University. He was a sessional instructor of design technology at Alberta University of the Arts for over 20 years. He has designed most of Frontenac's books. Terry Davies, Owner and Managing Editor, has been a professional writer, editor and college instructor for over 30 years. Acquisitions and Senior Poetry Editor, Micheline Maylor, was Calgary’s Poet Laureate from 2016 to 2018, the winner of the Lois Hole Award for Editing in 2020, and the winner of BPAA's Robert Kroetsch Award for Poetry in 2022. In 2022, Micheline Maylor was also awarded the prestigious Queen Elizabeth II Platinum Jubilee Medal for her contribution to the Albertan literary scene.
