= Morahan =

Morahan is an Irish surname, from the Irish Ó Murcháin, meaning 'sea-warrior'. Notable people with the surname include:

- Andy Morahan (born 1958), English commercial, film and music video director
- Caroline Morahan (born 1977), Irish actress and television host
- Christopher Morahan (born 1929), English stage and television director and producing manager
- Edythe Morahan de Lauzon, Canadian poet
- Eugene Morahan (1869–1949), American sculptor
- Hattie Morahan (born 1978), English television, film and stage actress
- Jim Morahan (1902–1976), British art director
- Luke Morahan (born 1990), Australian Rugby Union Player
- Thomas Morahan (1931–2010), member of the New York State Senate
- Thomas N. Morahan (1906–1969), British film designer
