= Minnie Blanche Bishop =

Canadian writer (1864–1917)

Minnie Blanche Bishop (27 December 1864 – 16 October 1917) was a teacher and author in Canada.

Bishop was born and received much of her education in Nova Scotia. She became an advocate for women's rights in education and was one of the first to break the all-male barrier at Acadia College. She received a BA there in 1886 being the only woman in the class. Later she obtained MAs from both Acadia and McMaster.

During a period at McMaster University she came to know Theodore Harding Rand.
