= Libby Scheier =

Canadian poet and writer (1946–2000)

- Born: May 31, 1946; Brooklyn, New York
- Died: November 14, 2000 (aged 54)
- Education: Sarah Lawrence College (BA, 1968); State University of New York at Stony Brook (MA English, 1971)
- Occupations: Poet, writer
- Children: Jacob Scheier

Libby Scheier (May 31, 1946 – November 14, 2000) was a Canadian poet and short story writer.

== Personal life ==
She was born in Brooklyn, New York, and studied at Sarah Lawrence College and the State University of New York. During the sixties, Scheier interest and involvement in women's rights and pacifism grew.

Robert Priest and Beverley Daurio were her friends of over twenty years.

Her son Jacob Scheier is also a poet. He won the Governor General's Award for English language poetry in 2008 for his debut collection More to Keep Us Warm.

In 2000 after a struggle with breast cancer, Scheier died in Toronto at the age of fifty-four.

== Career ==
After living in France, California and Israel, in 1975, Scheier moved to Toronto and became the literary columnist for the Toronto Star.

In 1988, Scheier joined York University's creative writing program. In 1994, she founded the Toronto Writing Workshop and also became its director.

In Canada, Scheier was a member of the Writers' Union of Canada, PEN Canada and the League of Canadian Poets. Other affiliations included the Trotskyist League of Canada, the Canadian Abortion Rights Action League, Women and Words, and the Cross-Cultural Communication Centre.

== Works ==
=== Poetry ===
- The Larger Life. (Black Moss Press, 1983)
- Second Nature. (Coach House Press, 1986)
- Sky: a poem in four pieces. (Mercury Press, 1990)
- Kaddish for my father: new and selected poems. (ECW Press, 1999)

=== Fiction ===
- Saints and Runners (Mercury Press, 1993)

=== Anthologies ===
- Language in Her Eye Writing and Gender (Views by Canadian Women Writing in English). (Coach House Press, 1990)
