= Kate Gordon =

Kate Gordon may refer to:

- Kate Gordon (energy analyst), American lawyer and urban planner
- Kate Gordon (writer), Australian writer
- Kate Gordon (soccer)
- Kate M. Gordon (1861–1932), American suffragist
- Kate Gordon Moore (1878–1963), American psychologist
- Kate Gordon, character in Falling Skies

== See also ==
- Catherine Gordon (disambiguation)
