= Tammy Armstrong =

Canadian poet and novelist

Tammy Lynn Armstrong (born March 26, 1974) is a Canadian poet and novelist. She is most noted for her 2002 collection Bogman's Music, which was a shortlisted finalist for the Governor General's Award for English-language poetry at the 2002 Governor General's Awards.

Originally from St. Stephen, New Brunswick, Armstrong was educated at the University of British Columbia (BFA, MFA) and the University of New Brunswick, where she received a PhD in literature.

== Career ==
Armstrong has published the poetry collections Unravel (2004), Take Us Quietly (2006) and The Scare in the Crow (2010), and the novels Translations: Aístreann (2002) and Pye-Dogs (2008).

In 2017, Armstrong's Hermit God Spot made the longlist for the CBC Poetry Prize.

== Bibliography ==
=== Novel ===
- Translations: Aístreann (2002)
- Pye-Dogs (2008)
- Pearly Everlasting (2024)

=== Short story collections ===
- Bogman's Music (2002)
- Unravel (2004)
- Take Us Quietly (2006)
- The Scare in the Crow (2010)

== See also ==
- Canadian literature
- Canadian poetry
- List of Canadian poets
- List of Canadian writers
