= Sheree-Lee Olson =

Canadian novelist, poet and journalist

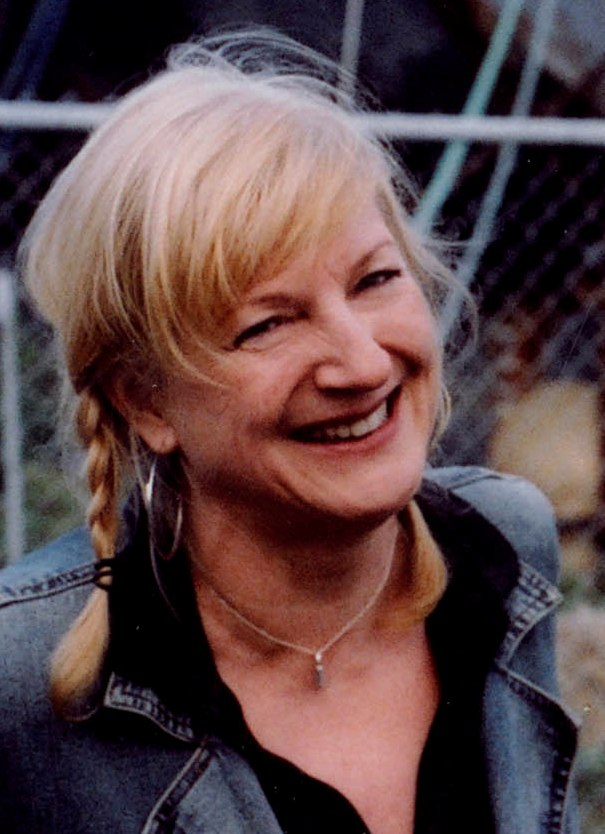
- Born: December 11, 1954 (age 71); Picton, Ontario, Canada
- Occupations: Novelist, Poet, Journalist
- Writing career
- Genres: Literature, Poetry, Non-fiction
- Notable work: Sailor Girl
- Website: sheree-leeolson.com

Sheree-Lee Olson (born December 11, 1954) is a Canadian novelist, poet and journalist.

== Biography ==
She was born in Picton, Ontario on the shores of Lake Ontario and grew up across Canada and in Europe, moving frequently with her family to her father's military postings. Eventually she earned degrees in visual art (York), philosophy (Leuven, in Belgium) and journalism (Ryerson). She was an editor at The Globe and Mail, Canada's leading national newspaper, from 1985 to 2013.

Olson's poetry and fiction can be found in Descant and The Antigonish Review. Her essays have appeared in The Globe and Mail and Between Interruptions: Thirty Women Tell The Truth About Motherhood (2007).

In 2007-08 she was the Webster/McConnell Fellow in the Canadian Journalism Fellowships Program at Massey College, University of Toronto.

Her first novel, Sailor Girl, was published in 2008 by Porcupine's Quill. It got attention across Canada and received several favourable reviews, including those on CBC Radio One Talking Books and in The Globe and Mail. A review in Canadian Literature journal concludes "Olson has announced herself as one of the new bright lights in Canadian literature."

In 2011, Olson received a "Bookmark" - a plaque bearing a selection from a notable Canadian literary work - in Port Colborne at Lock 8 on the Welland Canal, site of a key scene in Sailor Girl. Project Bookmark Canada celebrates locally inspired writing by installing Bookmarks in situ.

In 2013, producers Markham Street Films announced that Olson's Sailor Girl was under development as a feature film with director Anita Doron. The big screen adaptation, with screenplay written by Johanna Schneller, begins filming in the summer of 2014.
