= Leslie Greentree =

Canadian poet and writer

- Born: Leslie Greentree
- Occupations: Poet, Writer, Editor
- Website: http://lesliegreentree.ca

Leslie Greentree is a Canadian poet and writer.

== Career ==
Born in Grande Prairie, Alberta, Leslie was educated at the University of Lethbridge, from which she received Bachelor of Arts and Bachelor of Education degrees. Greentree resides in Edmonton, Alberta where she previously worked for the St. Albert Public Library in St. Albert, Alberta, and continues to do freelance work.

Greentree's first book of poetry, guys named Bill came out in 2002 was quickly followed in 2003 by go-go dancing for Elvis. In 2004, she won the CBC Poetry Face-off for Calgary, and competed in the National Face-off.

To date, she is most noted for her poetry collection go-go dancing for Elvis which shortlisted for the Griffin Poetry Prize in 2004.

== Awards ==
go-go dancing for Elvis was shortlisted for the Griffin Poetry Prize in 2004. In 2006, Greentree published her first collection of short stories, entitled A Minor Planet for You and won the Alberta Literary Awards Howard O'Hagan prize for best book of short fiction (2007).

== Productions ==
Oral Fixations, Greentree's first play, co-written with Blaine Newton, received its world premiere in October 2014. It was produced by Ignition Theatre in Red Deer, Alberta.

== Bibliography ==
=== Poetry ===
- guys named Bill (Frontenac House, 2002)
- go-go dancing for Elvis (Frontenac House, 2003)

=== Short fiction ===
- A Minor Planet for You (University of Alberta Press, 2006)
- Not the Apocalypse I Was Hoping For (University of Calgary Press, 2022)

=== Plays ===
- Oral Fixations co-written with Blaine Newton, 2015
