= Ronnie R. Brown =

Canadian poet (born 1946)

Ronnie R. Brown (born November 8, 1946) is a Canadian poet who lives and writes in Ottawa, Ontario.

Born in Brockton, Massachusetts, Brown has spent most of her adult life in Canada, living first in Montreal and then in Ottawa. She was awarded both the Board of Governors' and the Graduate Students' Award for excellence in poetry. Brown is now teaching creative writing at both Concordia and Carleton Universities, and produces and co-hosts the FM arts programme Sparks II.

The author of several collections of poetry, Brown's work has also appeared in over 100 magazines in Canada, the U.S. and Australia, and in numerous anthologies. In 1986, a staged adaptation of her poetry series, On Falling Bodies, was presented in three "sold out" performances at the atelier of Ottawa's National Arts Centre. Brown has been a winner or finalist in many literary competitions, including The Ray Burrell (1st place - 2001, HM - 2003) and the Sandburg-Livesay Competition (first place - 1989). Her 2000 collection, Photographic Evidence, was short-listed for the Archibald Lampman Award in 2001.

== Bibliography ==
- Re Creation (1987), ISBN 0-919511-42-2
- Decisive Moments (1988), ISBN 0-920798-09-8
- Photographic Evidence (2000), ISBN 0-88753-347-7
- States of Matter (2005), ISBN 0-88753-404-X
- Night Echoes (2006), ISBN 0-88753-427-9
