= Daniel Sloate =

Canadian translator, poet and playwright (1931–2009)

- Born: January 27, 1931
- Died: April 10, 2009 (aged 78)
- Education: University of Western Ontario (BA); University of Paris
- Occupations: Translator; poet; playwright

Daniel Sloate (January 27, 1931 – April 10, 2009) was a Canadian translator, poet and playwright.

== Biography ==
Daniel Sloate was born in Windsor, Ontario, on January 27, 1931.

Sloate attended the University of Western Ontario (where he obtained a B.A. in French and English) and obtained a doctorate in French literature from the Sorbonne. He taught translation at the Translators' School in Paris before taking a position also teaching translation at the Université de Montréal, where he remained until his retirement in 1995.

== Awards and recognition ==
- Winner: Félix-Antoine Savard Award offered by the Translation Center, Columbia University in 1991 for his translation of Selected Poems by Marie Uguay
- Nominated: 1998 Governor General's Awards, Translation (from French to English) for Aknos and Other Poems by Fulvio Caccia.

== Bibliography ==
=== Original works ===
==== Non-fiction ====
- Les Traquenards de la grammaire anglaise (with Denis G. Gauvin) (1985)

==== Novels ====
- Lydia Thrippe (1999)

==== Poetry ====
- Poems in Blue and Black (1955)
- Words in Miniature (1972)
- A Taste of Earth, A Taste of Flame (1981)
- Dead Shadows (1983)
- Of Dissonance and Shadows (2001)
- Chaque étreinte est un oubli Trad. François Peraldi (2003)

==== Theatre ====
- The Countess Plays, five one-act plays (1995)
- I Is Another (2008)

=== Translations ===
- Illuminations by Arthur Rimbaud (1971), (1990)
- First Secrets by Éloi de Grandmont (1983)
- On Mont-Courant by Serge Meyer (1985)
- The Passions of Mr. Desire by André Roy (1986)
- Selected Poems by Marie Uguay (1991)
- Black Diva by Jean-Paul Daoust (1991)
- The Life of Mozart by Stendhal (1994)
- Interviews to Literature by Jean Royer (1996)
- Impala by Carole David (1997)
- Interviews with the Phoenix by Fulvio Caccia (1998)
- Aknos and Other Poems by Fulvio Caccia (1998)
- Blue Ashes by Jean-Paul Daoust (1999)
- Selected Poems by Fulvio Caccia (2000)
- Parallel to Life by André Roy (2001)
- A Father's Revenge by Pan Bouyoucas (with George Tombs) (2001)
- Isabelle's Notebooks by Sylvie Chaput (with Peter Vranckx) (2002)
- Republic Denied: The Loss of Canada, by Fulvio Caccia (with Domenic Cusmano) (2002)
- No End to the World: Selected Poems by Hélène Dorion (2004)
- Life in the Singular: Selected Poems by Claude Beausoleil (2004)
- The Night Will Be Insistent: Selected Poems: 1987–2000 by Denise Desautels (2006)
- I'll Always Become What's Left of Me by Guillaume Bourque (2006)
