= Lords of Shouting =

In Jewish and Christian mythology, the Lords of Shouting, or Masters of Howling, are a group of 1,550 myriads of angels (15,500,000 angels) who gather at dusk and sing. The choir is led by Jeduthun, a former master of music appointed by David, who by tradition ascended to become an angel. Other choirs, led by Jeduthun's former companions Heman and Asaph, continue the singing during the other times of day. It is said that at dawn, because of chanting of the Lords of Shouting, judgment is lightened and the world is blessed.
