= Marion E. Moodie =

Canadian botanist and nurse

Marion Elizabeth Moodie
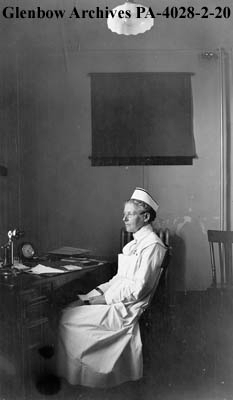
- Marion Moodie, Ninette Sanatorium, Ninette, Manitoba
- Born: January 30, 1867; Quebec City, Quebec
- Died: April 26, 1958 (aged 91); Calgary, Alberta
- Education: School of Nursing, Calgary General Hospital, (1895-1898)
- Occupations: Nurse, Author, Poet

Marion Elizabeth Moodie (January 30, 1867 – April 26, 1958) was a Canadian nurse and botanist who was the first nurse to graduate in what became the province of Alberta. She was also an accomplished poet and writer.

== Biography ==
=== Early life and education ===
Marion Elizabeth Moodie was born on 30 January 1867 in Quebec City, Quebec, to a family of Scottish and English descent. Her birth occurred in the same year as Canadian Confederation. She spent her early life in eastern Canada before moving west with her family to Calgary, North-west Territories in 1891.

Moodie was educated first at a private school and later at a girls' high school, where her studies included English history, literature, mathematics, Latin, French, biology, music, and art. In later autobiographical notes she recalled that her interest in nursing began in childhood. At about the age of twelve, while visiting a friend who was recovering from illness, she found that helping care for the patient appealed strongly to her. She later wrote that "the little acts of waiting on her which I was able to do appealed to me so strongly" that she confided to her friend that she believed she "should like to be a nurse."

A few years later, she gained practical experience caring for sick family members. Moodie recalled that it "seemed to fall naturally to me to be the one to help my mother with any nursing in the family," and when her mother became ill she took on much of the responsibility for her care. She explained that the family was then "living in the country out of reach of a competent doctor or any qualified nurses," circumstances that required family members to provide much of their own medical care.

=== Move to Calgary ===
In 1891, at about the age of twenty-four, Moodie moved west with her family to Calgary during a period of rapid settlement across the Canadian Prairies. At the time Calgary was still a young frontier town of only a few thousand residents. Incorporated in 1884 and connected to the Canadian Pacific Railway in 1883, it had grown quickly as a commercial centre for the surrounding ranching region. The town had developed around Fort Calgary, originally a post of the North-West Mounted Police, and medical services remained limited while trained nurses were rare in western Canada.

=== Nursing training ===
In the spring of 1895, at the age of twenty-eight, Moodie entered training as a probationary nurse at the School of Nursing of Calgary General Hospital. Her training began at the Calgary Cottage Hospital, a small nine-bed hospital that provided early medical care for the growing town. Within a few weeks operations were transferred to the newly constructed Calgary General Hospital near Fort Calgary.

Nursing education at the time followed an apprenticeship model that had developed from reforms in professional nursing associated with Florence Nightingale. Student nurses learned primarily through practical work on hospital wards. Although some medical texts were available, training consisted largely of observing physicians, assisting with patient care, and gradually assuming increasing responsibilities under supervision. After completing an initial probationary period she was formally recognized as a student nurse and later advanced to the position of senior nurse, supervising junior and probationary nurses in training.

Moodie completed her training in 1898 at the age of thirty-one as the sole member of her graduating class at the Calgary General Hospital School of Nursing. Her diploma made her the first professionally trained nurse to graduate in what later became the province of Alberta, which at the time formed part of the North-West Territories.

=== Professional nursing career ===
For five years she engaged in private nursing and hospital work in central and southern Alberta, and later in Manitoba. During the war Moodie was nursing sister, and later matron, at Ogden Military Hospital, Calgary.

== Botanical work ==
Alongside her nursing career, Moodie developed a serious interest in botany and spent considerable time collecting plants across southern Alberta.

These plants were preserved as herbarium specimens. Moodie pressed and dried the plants, labelled them with the date and location of collection, and sent them to scientific institutions where they were mounted as herbarium sheets for study. Many of her specimens also include numbered collection records, indicating that she maintained a systematic catalogue of her fieldwork. Such specimens allow botanists to document where plant species grow and how their distribution changes over time.

Herbarium records show that she gathered specimens around Calgary, in the coulees of the Red Deer River valley near Rosebud and Rosedale, and in the mountains around Banff. She was not simply collecting near home; her fieldwork ranged across prairie grasslands, river valleys, and Rocky Mountain slopes.

Many of the surviving specimens date from the spring and early summer of 1915 and 1916, the main wildflower season on the prairie. During this period Moodie collected plants such as Phlox hoodii, a prairie wildflower recorded near Calgary on 23 April 1915; and Astragalus bisulcatus from the Rosebud district that June. A few weeks later she collected Cornus canadensis along the Elbow River valley near Calgary. She also recorded Rosa arkansana, the wild prairie rose, in the coulees near Rosedale. Her mountain collections included the orchid Calypso bulbosa, gathered on Tunnel Mountain near Banff on 26 June 1916, along with Viburnum edule, a shrub of northern forests, collected in the same region shortly afterward.

Moodie’s specimens were distributed to major research collections including the Smithsonian Institution, the New York Botanical Garden, Harvard University, and the Field Museum in Chicago. More than 350 specimens attributed to her are preserved in the Smithsonian's collections alone.

At a time when the flora of western Canada was still being systematically documented, collectors such as Moodie played an important role in providing plant material for scientific study. Through her fieldwork across prairie and mountain environments, she contributed to the early botanical record of Alberta.

== Writing ==
Moodie was not only a nurse and botanical collector but also a writer. She published poems, stories, and essays that drew on her experiences in western Canada and on her interest in the natural world.

Her first book, Songs of the West, appeared in 1904. More than two decades later she published a prose fairy tale titled The Legend of Dryas in 1926. Both works reflect the same interest in landscape and natural history that appears in other parts of her life, including her botanical collecting. Small poetry collections like this were common in Canada at the time and were often published by local or regional presses.

Moodie also wrote for Canadian periodicals. Biographical summaries note that she contributed articles on pioneer nursing, children's stories, and essays about outdoor life and the landscapes of western Canada. Her writing belongs to a broader tradition of early twentieth century regional literature that described everyday life and environments on the Canadian prairies.

Songs of the West appeared during a period when Canadian poetry often focused on landscape. In the late nineteenth and early twentieth centuries many writers used descriptions of the natural environment to explore ideas about Canadian identity. Poets such as Charles G. D. Roberts, Bliss Carman, and Archibald Lampman were particularly associated with this tradition and are often grouped together as the Confederation poets. Moodie was not a major literary figure on that scale, but her work reflects the same wider interest in landscape and regional experience that shaped much Canadian writing of the time.

Evidence of how her work circulated appears in a contemporary review in the University of Toronto literary journal Acta Victoriana. The review discussed Songs of the West alongside books by Annie L. Jack, H. Isabel Graham, Isabel Ecclestone Mackay, and James A. Tucker. The reviewer described Moodie's collection as containing "graceful and slight work", suggesting that it was seen as a modest but recognizable contribution to Canadian poetry.

Her later work, The Legend of Dryas, further illustrates the connection between her writing and her interest in natural history. The title refers to the plant Dryas octopetala, linking the story directly to botanical themes and to the mountain environments she had studied while collecting plants in the Rocky Mountains.

Moodie's writing occupied a smaller place in early twentieth century Canadian literary culture, but it reflects the same interest in landscape and natural observation that appears in her botanical collecting and in her accounts of pioneer nursing.
