= Micheline Maylor =

Canadian poet and academic

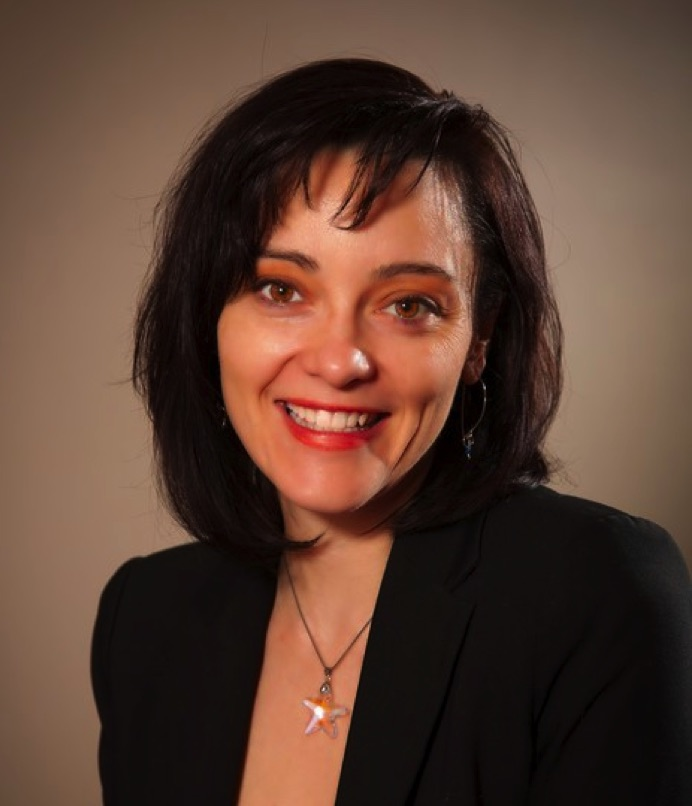

Calgary Poet Laureate Emeritus
- Preceded by: Derek Beaulieu
- Succeeded by: Sheri-D Wilson

Personal details
- Born: Windsor, Ontario, Canada
- Spouse: Jeff Kovitz KC
- Occupation: Poet, Academic, Critic, Editor
- Website: michelinemaylor.com

Micheline Maylor (born in 1970) is a Canadian poet, academic, critic and editor.

== Education ==
Maylor earned a BA (honours) in creative writing with a minor in anthropology from the University of Calgary. She received a master's degree with distinction in creative writing and Canadian literature from Lancaster University, supported by the International Research Scholarship and Overseas Research Scholarship. She completed a PhD in late 20th-century Canadian literature and creative writing at Newcastle University.

== Career ==
Maylor taught creative writing at Mount Royal University until her retirement in 2022, where she received the Faculty Association Excellence in Teaching Award in 2015 and the Distinguished Faculty Award in 2018.

She co-founded the Freefall Literary Society, serving as editor-in-chief. Since 2012, she has been executive acquisitions editor for poetry at Frontenac House Press, editing works such as Billy-Ray Belcourt's This Wound Is a World (2018 Griffin Poetry Prize winner) and Basma Kavanagh’s Ruba’iyat for the Time of Apricots (2019 Robert Kroetsch Award (Book Publishers Association of Alberta Award) winner).

Maylor served as Calgary's Poet Laureate from 2016 to 2018 the first woman in the role. She held author-in-residence positions at the Calgary Public Library (2016), Alexandra Writers Centre Society (2017), and Saskatchewan Writers’ Guild (2019).

== Poetry ==
Maylor has published poetry in over 85 journals across five countries. Her collections include Full Depth: The Raymond Knister Poems (2007, ReLit Award longlist), Whirr and Click (2013, Pat Lowther Award shortlist), Little Wildheart (2017), Robert Kroetsch Award shortlist), the anthology Drifting Like a Metaphor (2018), and The Bad Wife (2021, translated into Italian as La cattiva moglie, Robert Kroetsch Award winner, Raymond Souster Award longlist).

== Awards and Honors ==
Petra Kenny Award shortlist (poetry), 2007

Geist postcard story contest, 3rd place, 2013

Pat Lowther Award shortlist, 2014

Mount Royal University Faculty Association Excellence in Teaching, 2015

Alberta Magazine Publishers Association Volunteer of the Year, 2020

Lois Hole Award for Editorial Excellence (Quartet series), 2019/2020

Book Publishers Association of Alberta Robert Kroetsch Award for Poetry (The Bad Wife), 2021

Queen's Platinum Jubilee Medal, 2022

== Selected Bibliography ==
=== Books ===
Full Depth: The Raymond Knister Poems (Wolsak and Wynn, 2007) ISBN 1-894987-17-9

Starfish (Rubicon Press, 2011) ISBN 978-0-9812848-9-7

Whirr and Click (Frontenac House, 2013) ISBN 978-1-897181-86-7

Little Wildheart (University of Alberta Press, 2017) ISBN 978-1-77212-233-6

Drifting Like a Metaphor (Frontenac House, ed., 2018) ISBN 978-1-927823-80-4

The Bad Wife University of Alberta Press, 2021) ISBN 978-1-77212-548-1
