= E. A. Jenns =

Canadian poet and lawyer

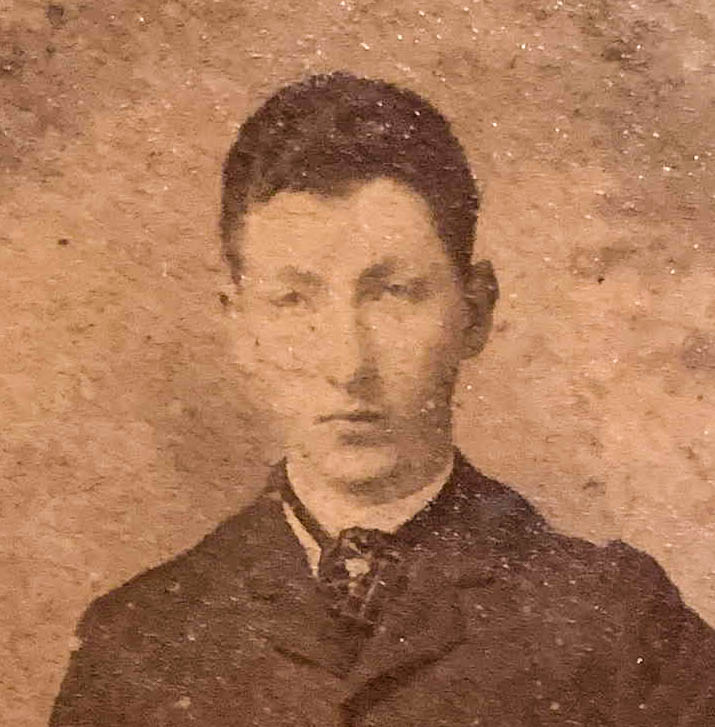
- E. A. Jenns, circa 1880s
- Born: Eustace Alvanley Jenns; July 14, 1860; Middlewich, Cheshire, United Kingdom
- Died: June 21, 1930 (aged 69); Vancouver, British Columbia, Canada
- Occupation: Lawyer
- Writing career
- Genres: Poetry

Eustace Alvanley Jenns (1860–1930), usually known as E. A. Jenns, was a Canadian poet and lawyer. In 1880, he published the first sizeable work of literature in British Columbia, Evening to Morning, and Other Poems. Jenns practiced law in New Westminster and Vancouver. His second volume of verse, Orpheus and Eurydice and Other Poems, appeared in 1910. Apart from poetry, he also wrote political and literary articles.

== Biography ==
The son of Reverend Percival Jenns and Emma Jane Arden, Eustace Alvaney Jenns was born in Middlewich, Cheshire, England, on 14 July 1860. At the age of five, he accompanied his parents to Victoria, British Columbia, where his father was to be minister for the Anglican diocese. Jenns was educated at Collegiate School in Victoria, and St. John's College, in Hurstpierpont, Sussex.

Under the direction of the Victoria publishers, Thomas Napier Hibben and Robert Taylor Williams, Jenns learned the art of typesetting and bookbinding. In 1880, encouraged by his old schoolmaster, he decided to publish his poetry. The result was a beautifully produced book, Evening to Morning, and Other Poems. It was the first bound work of literature published in British Columbia, and at forty pages, the longest to that time. (Note: Sawney's Letters: or, Cariboo Rhymes, by James Anderson, was published in Barkerville in 1866 by the Cariboo Sentinel, perhaps as a broadsheet, although no copy of the first edition has survived. The second and third editions published in 1868 and 1869 were respectively four and twenty-four pages, in medium and small format. The next literary works published in British Columbia were two folded pamphlets, or chapbooks, of individual poems, by George Mason, a rector in Nanaimo, published in 1875 in Victoria. The titles were Lo! The Poor Indian! and Ode on the Loss of the Steamship "Pacific," November 4th, 1875.) Five hundred copies were printed for sale. When Jenns later recalled the books from the distributors, he found that only one copy had been sold. An 1881 review appeared in the London illustrated newspaper The Graphic. It described the title poem, concerned with eternal mysteries, as perhaps beyond the young poet's powers, but the Norse inspired "Battle Song" had spirit. In 1895, The Province, a Victoria weekly newspaper, dismissively opined the book wasn't of high merit. Robert Bringhurst wrote that, while juvenile, the poems showed that Jenns "had talent and the capacity for introspection."

During his law studies, Jenns articled with Alexander Rocke Robertson and David McEwen Eberts. From 1881 to 1887 he was registrar of the Supreme Court and County Court in New Westminster. In 1884, against the wishes of her parents, he married Madeline Fortune Webster in the town of Granville, later known as Vancouver. They had one son followed by five daughters. In New Westminster, he successfully argued his first court case in 1887. Jenns became partners in the firm of Corbould, McColl & Jenns, before establishing his own practice in 1891. In 1905, he relocated to Vancouver. Three years later, he won a shareholder lawsuit against the estate of the second mayor of Vancouver, David Oppenheimer.

In 1910, Jenns published a second volume of verse, Orpheus and Eurydice and Other Poems. The title page states the book was for private circulation only. According to Jenns' preface, the poems were written between 1881 and 1885. A favourable profile of Jenns and the work was featured in The Province in 1924, remarking that the variety of sonnets, lyrics, soliloquies, and ballads, displayed versatility of inspiration and mood.

In his later years, Jenns was librarian for the Vancouver Courthouse. Besides his two volumes of verse, he published individual poems as well as political and literary articles, often in local newspapers. He died on 21 June 1930 in Vancouver.

Archival fonds related to Jenns are located at the University of British Columbia and the British Columbia Archives.

== Gallery ==
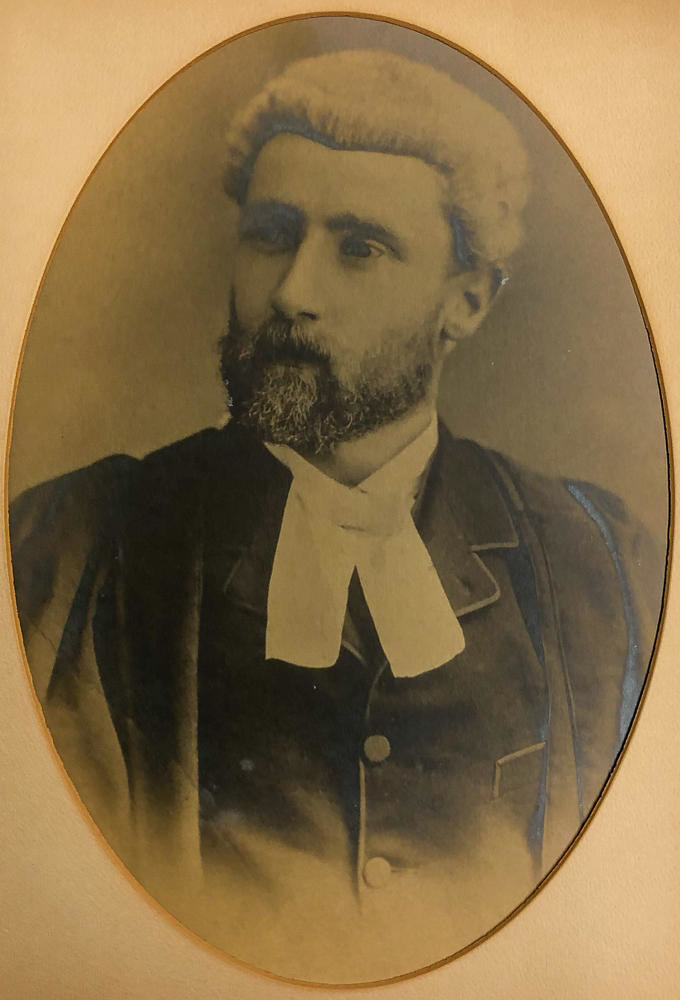
E. A. Jenns in barrister robes and wig

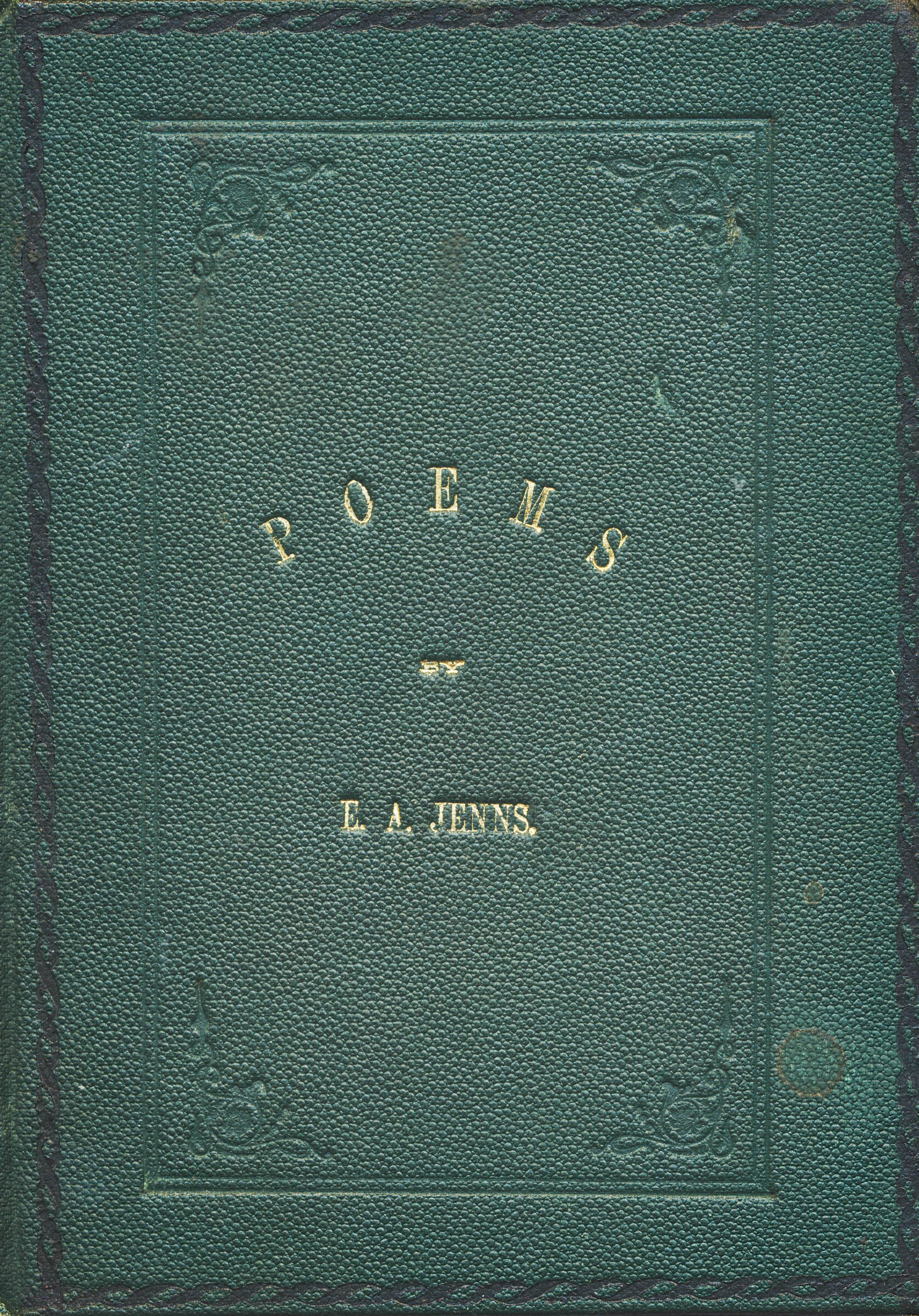
Evening to Morning, and Other Poems

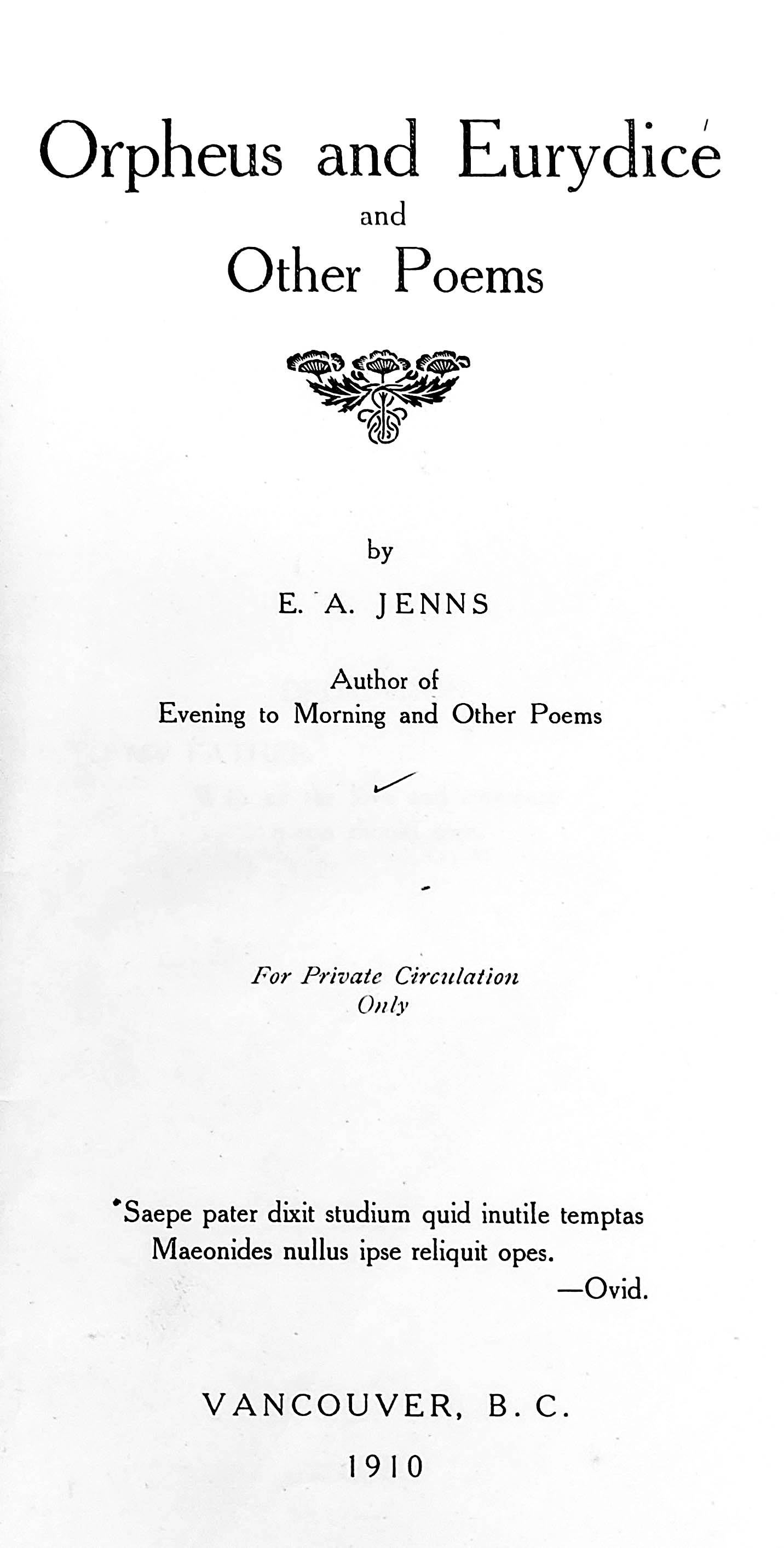
Title page to Orpheus and Eurydice and Other Poems

== Sources ==
- Bringhurst, Robert (1984). Ocean, Paper, Stone: The catalogue of an exhibition of printed objects which chronicle more than a century of literary publishing in British Columbia. William Hoffer. ISBN 0-919758-07-X.
- Zilm, Glennis (1981). Early B.C. Books: An Overview of Trade Book Publishing in British Columbia in the 1800s with Checklists and Selected Bibliography Related to British Columbiana (M.A. Thesis). Simon Fraser University. Archived from the original on 8 October 2023.
