= Rod Anderson (writer) =

Canadian poet and musician (1935–2014)

- Born: 15 April 1935
- Died: 26 March 2014 (aged 78)
- Citizenship: Canadian
- Writing career
- Period: 1966–1989

Rodney James Anderson (15 April 1935 – 26 March 2014) was a Canadian poet, musician and chartered accountant. He lived in Toronto for decades, then moved to Cobourg, Ontario with his wife, Merike Lugus.

== Life and career ==
Born in Toronto, Ontario, Anderson graduated from the University of Toronto in 1956 with a Chemistry degree. In 1959, he became a Chartered Accountant. After a career in accounting he turned to poetry and eventually music composition.
In 1988 he won in the poetry category in a competition by Cross-Canada Writers' Quarterly (ISSN 0227-2652). His poems have been anthologized in The Antigonish Review, Contemporary Verse 2, Cross-Canada Writers' Magazine, DIS-EASE, Fiddlehead, Germination, Grain, Implosion, Matrix, Museletter, Poetry Canada Review, Poetry Toronto, Quarry Magazine, Toronto Life, The Toronto Sun, Waves, and Zymergy and in three anthologies: Garden Varieties, The Dry Wells of India, and More Garden Varieties. He has written two opera librettos for the Canadian Opera Company, including Dulcitius, performed by the COC ensemble in 1988 and a three-act opera Mario and the Magician, with music by Harry Somers performed at the Elgin Theatre, Toronto in 1992. Anderson was a member of the Canadian League of Poets.

Anderson died on 26 March 2014, at the age of 78.

== Works ==
- 1966: Analytical Auditing (co-author with R.M. Skinner; Pitman)
- 1977: The External Audit (Pitman) ISBN 0-273-04222-X
- 1979: Dollar-Unit Sampling (co-author with Donald A. Lselie, Albert D. Teitlebaum; Copp Clark), ISBN 0-7730-4278-4
- 1989: Sky Falling Sunny Tomorrow, ISBN 0-919897-16-9 (Wolsak and Wynn)

== Journal articles ==
- Discussion of Considerations in Choosing Statistical Sampling Procedures in Auditing. R. J. Anderson, Donald A. Leslie. Journal of Accounting Research, Vol. 13, Studies on Statistical Methodology in Auditing (1975), pp. 53–64

== See also ==
- Canadian literature
- Canadian poetry
- List of Canadian poets
- List of Canadian writers

== Sources ==
- Greene, Anna Maria (August 2000). "Portrait of an artist". CAmagazine. Canadian Institute of Chartered Accountants.
- Canadian Literature, Issue No. 129, Summer, 1991 – Review by Bert Almon of Sky Falling Sunny Tomorrow (review not available online, but see the issue's table of contents at http://www.canlit.ca/archive/archive1959-1999/cl_129.html )
