= Walter Scott MacFarlane =

Walter Scott MacFarlane (1896–1979) was a Canadian soldier and bard who composed poetry and songs exploring faith, love, war and peace, the loss of comrades and loved ones and his love of Cape Breton. He was known as the "Bard of Margaree."

He was born near the Margaree River of Cape Breton Island, Nova Scotia, Canada and lived in Inverness in his later life. He wrote songs and poetry in both Scottish Gaelic and English, although many of the Gaelic works have been lost. He fought in both World Wars, including the Battle of Vimy Ridge and this combined with his strong religious faith, is evident in much of his poetry. A collection of his work, entitled Songs of the Valley edited by Kay MacDonald and his son Pat MacFarlane was published in the 1980s.

Walter Scott MacFarlane was the grandfather of Canadian musicians Scott MacFarlane (Bassist - Sandbox, Crush, Kilt) and Kris MacFarlane (Drummer - Great Big Sea, Alan Doyle, Spirit of the West).
