= Joseph Sherman =

Jewish Canadian poet and visual arts editor

Joseph Howard Sherman OC (1945 in Bridgewater, Nova Scotia – January 9, 2006 in Charlottetown, Prince Edward Island) was a Jewish Canadian poet and visual arts editor. He was named to the Order of Canada in 2003. Husband to Ann Sherman. Father of Rebekah Sherman Condon and Matthew Sherman. Grandfather to Autumn West, David West, and Ariel West.

== Selected publications ==
- Birthday. (New Brunswick Chapbooks, 1969).
- Chaim the Slaughterer. (Oberon Press, 1974).
- Lords of Shouting. (Oberon Press, 1982).
- Thought Games/Other Voices. (The League of Canadian Poets, 1983).
- Translations Two (poems translated into German by Astrid Brunner). (Privately published, 1984).
- Transcription (9 years after). (CCAG&M, 1998).
- American Standard and Other Poems. (Oberon Press, 1999).
- Worried into Being: An Unfinished Alphabet. (Oberon Press, 2005).
- Beautiful Veins. (Acorn Press, 2006).
