= Nancy Bauer =

Canadian writer and editor

Nancy Bauer, née Nancy Luke (born July 7, 1934) is a Canadian writer and editor who writes for a number of Canadian maritime magazines about people who write, produce crafts and create visual art.

Born in Chelmsford, Massachusetts, the daughter of Grace Bridgeford and Wendell Luke, Bauer received her B.A. in English from Mount Holyoke College in 1956. She moved to Fredericton, New Brunswick in 1965.

From 1967 until 1983, Bauer was the publisher of 25 New Brunswick Chapbooks. She founded the Maritime Writers Workshop, and has served as writer-in-residence at the University of New Brunswick, the Cape Cod Writers Conference, East Word One, and Bemidji State University.

She was married to Bill Bauer, writer and retired professor, until his death in 2010.

== Awards ==
- 1982: 2nd prize, CBC Literary Competition
- 1999: Alden Nowlan Award for Excellence in the Literary Arts

== Selected bibliography ==
- "Finding a pattern with soothing words", New Brunswick Telegraph-Journal, February 6th, 2010
- "A matter of joining forces", New Brunswick Telegraph-Journal, April 25th, 2009
- 1982:Flora, Write this Down. Fredericton: Goose Lane Editions, .
- 1985:Wise Ears. Ottawa: Oberon, .
- 1988:The Opening Eye. Ottawa: Oberon, .
- 1991:Samara, the Wholehearted. Fredericton: Goose Lane Editions, .
- 1994:The Irrational Doorways of Mr. Gerard. Fredericton: Goose Lane Editions, .
