= Nancy-Gay Rotstein =

Canadian poet and novelist

Nancy-Gay Rotstein is a Canadian poet and novelist. In addition to her books of poetry, she is author of the novel Shattering Glass, a story about today's woman trying to balance career and family.

== Biography ==
Nancy-Gay Rotstein was born in Toronto, Ontario. She received a B.A. degree in 1965 and a master's degree in history in 1969 from the University of Toronto. She has a teaching certificate as a history specialist from the Ontario College of Education, University of Toronto. She returned to university to study law and received her LL.B. degree in 1985 and was admitted to the Ontario Bar in 1987.

Her first poetry collection – Through the Eyes of a Woman – was published in 1975, followed by Taking Off, China: Shockwaves, and This Horizon And Beyond: Poems Selected and New.

After graduating from law school, and drawing on her experiences there as a working mother trying to balance career and family, she began writing her novel, Shattering Glass, which was published in 1996.

She was appointed by the Canadian government in 1985 to the board of directors of the Canada Council for the Arts, and reappointed in 1988 for a second term.

During the period of the Free Trade Agreement negotiations between Canada and the United States, she advocated that Canadian ownership of its own publishing industry was essential for the preservation and protection of Canadian cultural identity. A proponent of funding for regional arts organizations, she also urged the development of programs to provide access to major cultural events to less populated areas. Her fellow directors elected her as their representative to the National Library Advisory Board in 1986, on which she served five years. She is a founding Member of the Public Lending Right Commission of Canada, the government agency which oversees payment of royalties to writers for the use of their books in libraries.

She was appointed in 1993 to the six-member board of Telefilm Canada, on which she served for five years.

She is married to Maxwell Rotstein, and has three children.

== Literary work ==
Rotstein began writing poetry as a young child and was first published at the age of 12, when her grandmother Ida Berk submitted (without her knowing it) one of her poems to the national magazine Chatelaine. The editor accepted the poem unaware it was written by a 12-year-old. When the school principal announced the publication of her poem over the school's public address system, she became embarrassed, and from then on wrote her poetry in secret. Many years later her husband accidentally came across a poem she had written and suggested she show her poems to poet Irving Layton who was at York University. Upon submitting a portfolio of her work to Layton she was accepted into his poetry workshop. It was Irving Layton who encouraged her to publish her first book of poetry, Through the Eyes of a Woman.

Published in 1975, Through the Eyes of a Woman garnered attention throughout Canada and officially launched her writing career. The poems in the volume, presented in two sections – "Focusing Outward: Woman and Society"; and "Focusing Inward: Woman and Family" – express a woman's view of the quality of modern life in Canada. The collection went into three printings, its sales considered remarkable for a book of poetry.

Taking Off, containing her poetic reflections on travel, followed in 1979. The poems are divided by topic – "Distant Journey," containing images of her travels abroad; "Human Journey," poems that portray the people of the lands she describes, with an emphasis on common human emotions; and "Homeland Journey," her personal reflections on her own country.

It was her third volume of poetry, which she titled China: Shockwaves, that brought her to the attention of an international audience. Resulting from her travels as one of the early Westerners permitted to enter China after the Cultural Revolution, it was published in Canada and the United States, and two years later in the United Kingdom. "It is a rare collection in that it is one of the few, in poetry or prose, by a Westerner that goes beyond the surface of China," said United Press International, and The Scotsman noted she had "a prescience which now seems extraordinary... Rotstein realized as early as 1980 that China was heading for another political revolution."

Her most recent collection of poetry, This Horizon And Beyond: Poems Selected and New, with a foreword by Irving Layton, contains poems from her earlier collections, presented thematically, as well as previously unpublished poems. Among the topics addressed in her poetry are lessons of history; ecological concerns for both the city and countryside; insights into events, both personal and historical, based on her Jewish heritage; and her reflections on Canada, its natural beauty, challenges and concerns. Among the never-before-published poems are those she wrote over a 25-year period about the cycles in family life – from birth and childhood through parenthood and the aging years – which she purposely held for publication as a unit in order to present the full range of family life.

"She has a strong sense of history, fair play and justice" said The Ottawa Citizen about the collection, and the Edmonton Journal said there is "a precision in language that somehow makes her poems both specific and universal." Maclean's Magazine wrote, "If there's a single theme that links a lifetime's work, it's just that – the impermanence of every human achievement, the fragility of peace, order and good government."

Upon returning to law school as a mother of three children, she became personally aware of the challenges faced by working mothers. She realized that "the most pressing and unresolved issue facing families today was how to successfully balance career and family" and decided to expose those realities and problems through fiction, resulting in her novel, Shattering Glass. Her research, professional training in history and law, and her interest in children's rights were a catalyst for several scenes in the novel. A firm believer of authenticity in the depiction of her settings, characters and their stories, she revisited every location she wrote about. In telling the story of one woman whose teenage son gets in trouble with the police, Rotstein was allowed into areas restricted to staff in a Detention Center in order to experience first-hand how a mother might feel if she found her child there. "It was important to make sure that every character, thought and word was totally realistic and honest," the author has said about the novel.

== Bibliography ==
=== Books of poetry ===
- Through the Eyes of a Woman – Griffin House, Canada, 1975
- Taking Off – Longman, Canada, 1979
- China: Shockwaves
  - McClelland & Stewart, Canada, 1987
  - Dodd, Mead, United States, 1987
  - Weidenfeld & Nicolson, United Kingdom, 1989
- This Horizon And Beyond: Poems Selected And New, Foreword by Irving Layton
  - McClelland & Stewart, Canada, 2001
  - Brandl & Schlesinger Book Publishers, Australia, 2001
  - The Overlook Press, United States, 2005
  - Duckworth Publishers, United Kingdom, 2005

=== Novels ===
- Shattering Glass
  - Translations: Italy, Denmark, Norway, Sweden, Finland, Poland, the Czech Republic, and Russia
