= Rachel Lebowitz =

Canadian writer (born 1975)

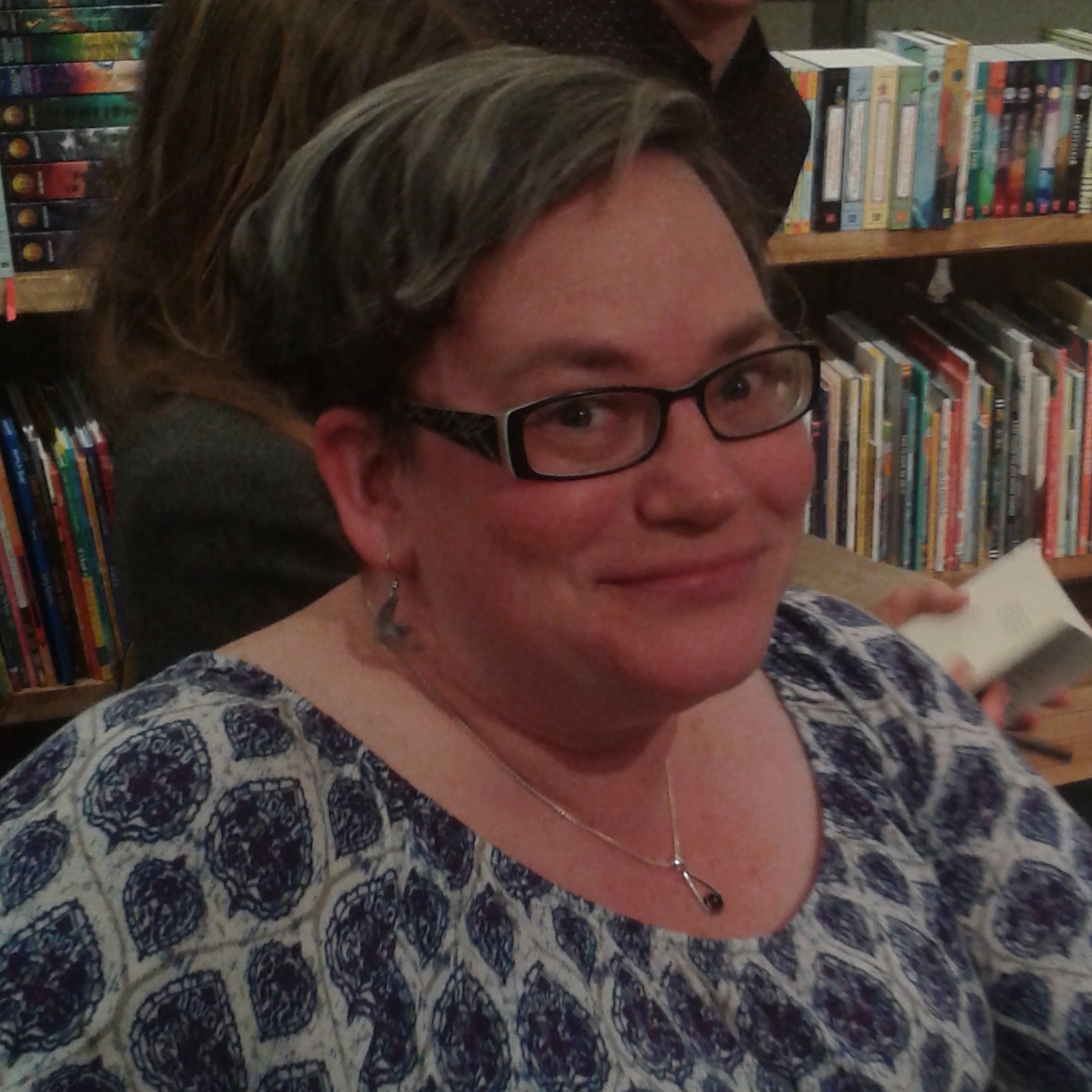
- Lebowitz in 2018
- Born: April 30, 1975 (age 51); Vancouver, British Columbia, Canada
- Occupation: Writer
- Writing career
- Notable works: Hannus, The Year of No Summer

Rachel Victoria Lebowitz (born 30 April 1975) is a Canadian writer.

== Biography ==
She was born in Vancouver, British Columbia, in 1975. After attending graduate school at Concordia University in Montreal, Quebec, she moved with her husband, Zachariah Wells, to Halifax, Nova Scotia, in 2003. In 2006, Lebowitz and Wells moved to Vancouver, where Lebowitz enrolled in a teacher-training programme at Simon Fraser University.

Also in 2006, Lebowitz's first book, Hannus, was published by Pedlar Press. Hannus is a biographical work about the life of Lebowitz's great-grandmother, Ida Hannus. It was shortlisted for the 2007 Roderick Haig-Brown Regional Prize and the Edna Staebler Award for Creative Non-Fiction. In 2008, she and Wells' children's book, Anything But Hank!, was published. Her third book, Cottonopolis, uses found and prose poems to tell the story of the cotton industry during the industrial revolution. It was published by Pedlar Press in Spring, 2013.

Lebowitz's fourth book, The Year of No Summer, appeared in 2018. Kirkus Reviews praised it as a "vivid, disquieting collage of prose pieces."
