= John Tyndall (poet) =

Canadian poet

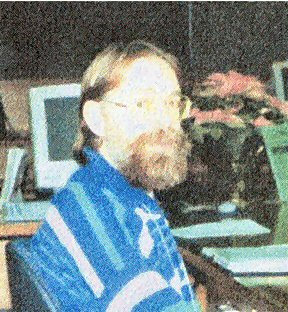
John Tyndall

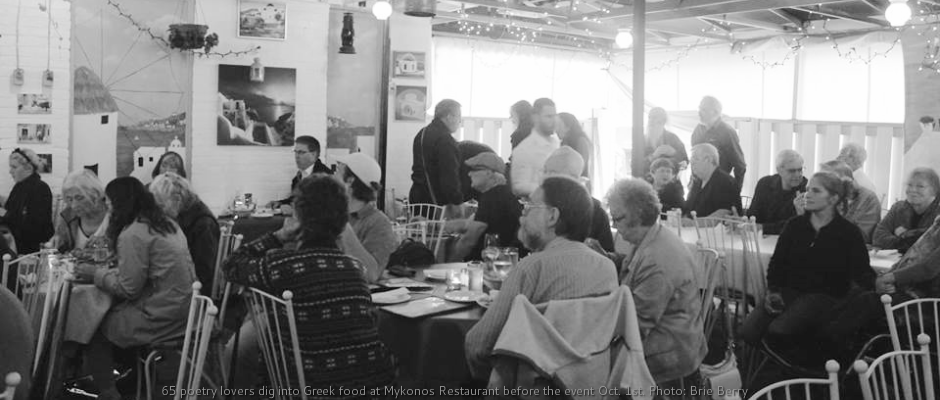
John Tyndall

John Tyndall (born 1951) is a Canadian poet living in London, Ontario.

== Biography ==
John Tyndall works at University of Western Ontario as a Librarian at the D.B. Weldon Library.

His work has been published in several anthologies and has been collected in two full-length volumes. His work has been reviewed by the University of Toronto Quarterly and the Library Journal.

Tyndall published The Fee For Exaltation, in the Palm Poets series from the Canadian small press publisher Black Moss Press.

== Books ==
- Free Rein (Black Moss Press, 2001) ISBN 978-0887533563
- The Fee For Exaltation (Black Moss Press, 2007) ISBN 978-0-88753-435-5
