= Bill Bauer (poet) =

American-Canadian poet

- Born: William Alfred Bauer; May 10, 1932; Portland, Maine
- Died: June 12, 2010 (aged 78)
- Occupations: poet, short story writer, university professor
- Spouse: Nancy Bauer
- Writing career
- Period: 1960s–1980s
- Notable works: Cornet Music for Plupy Shute, Everett Coogler, The Terrible Word, Unsnarling String, A Family Album, Bright with Invisible History: A William Bauer Reader

William Alfred Bauer (May 10, 1932 – June 12, 2010) was an American-Canadian writer. Born in Portland, Maine and raised in Auburn, Bauer was educated at Amherst College, Wesleyan University and the University of North Carolina. He married writer Nancy Bauer in 1956, and they had three children: Ernie, Grace and John. In 1965, he moved to New Brunswick to accept a professorship at the University of New Brunswick, and five years later he completed his PhD dissertation (University of North Carolina) on 18th-century letter-writing.

== Career ==
For many years Bauer was a regular member of the Ice House (a.k.a. McCord Hall, or Tuesday Night) community writers' workshop, and he served as both poetry and fiction editor at various times for The Fiddlehead, as well as writing many reviews for the magazine. Before his retirement in 1994, he taught courses in 18th-Century British Literature, Shakespeare, Canadian literature, Maritime literature and Creative Writing. His byline names included W. A. Bauer, William A. Bauer, William Bauer, and Bill Bauer. He published several chapbooks and collections of poetry, including Cornet Music for Plupy Shute (1968), Everett Coogler (1971), The Terrible Word (1978) and Unsnarling String (1983), as well as a short-story collection, Family Album (1979).

"…. a poet who can get his wild sense of humour into poems that are linguistically subtle and open in form. Bauer cares about language, and loves it. The comedy is his way of exploring the large questions of life as process rather than stasis. The Terrible Word is both damn good and damn entertaining."—Douglas Barbour, The Dalhousie Review

"A gentleman—rather than a vulgarian—satirist, Bauer does not often find vice in his fellow man, but perhaps that is so because the people in his poems are liable to be more confused than destructive…. But laugher almost always wins out over despair."—Michael Brian Oliver, The Fiddlehead

"One of Bauer's chief strengths in A Family Album is a strikingly inventive imagination. We are urged to share his delight in life's absurdities, even while recognizing that the foibles he describes in others are too frequently our own."—Roger MacDonald, Canadian Book Review Annual

"These stories are specific in capturing a recognizable region: the slow-paced, tradition-bound Eastern Seaboard. It is an idyllic world from certain angles and in certain seasons, but change the perspective, come two steps closer, and it darkens into a place betrayed and deserted by time…. For those interested in the art of narration, these stories are a pleasure to read. One savours the rich and varied vocabulary, and the experimentation with language and structure."—Carrie MacMillan, Quill and Quire

"Unsnarling String combines humour and down-to-earth philosophy, commonplace experience and delightful eccentricities. Bauer writes about simple things in life that become ridiculously tangled, and about how people reduce life's complications to simple formulas for survival….. Poems to be read aloud to family and friends." Richard Lemm, The Atlantic Provinces Book Review

== Works ==
- 1968: Cornet Music for Plupy Shute (New Brunswick Chapbooks)
- 1971: Everett Coogler (New Brunswick Chapbooks)
- 1978: The Terrible Word (Fiddlehead Poetry Books)
- 1979: Family Album (Oberon Press)
- 1983: Unsnarling String (Fiddlehead Poetry Books)
- 2010: Bright with Invisible History: A William Bauer Reader, ed. Brian Bartlett (Chapel Street Editions)
