= André Roy (writer) =

Canadian poet and arts critic

- Born: February 27, 1944 (age 82); Montreal, Quebec, Canada
- Occupations: poet, film and literary critic
- Writing career
- Period: 1970s–present
- Notable works: Action writing, L'Accélérateur d'intensité

André Roy (born February 27, 1944) is a Canadian poet and arts critic from Quebec. He won the Governor General's Award for French-language poetry in 1985 for Action writing and was a shortlisted nominee for the award on three other occasions.

He has also published extensively as a film and literary critic, and was an editor of the cultural magazines Hobo-Québec and Spirale. An archive of his papers is held by the Bibliothèque et Archives nationales du Québec. Several of his works have been translated into English by Daniel Sloate.

He was one of Quebec's earliest openly gay writers. In 2021, he was named the winner of the Blue Metropolis Violet Prize, a lifetime achievement award for LGBTQ Canadian writers.

== Awards and nominations ==
- 1979 Governor General's Awards - Nominee in French poetry for Les passions du samedi
- 1984 Governor General's Awards - Nominee in French poetry Les sept jours de la jouissance
- 1985 Governor General's Awards - Winner in French poetry for Action writing
- 1987 Grand Prix du Festival international de la poésie - L'Accélérateur d'intensité
- 1998 Prix de poésie Terrasses Saint-Sulpice - Vies
- 2008 Prix littéraire de Radio-Canada
- 2009 Governor General's Awards - Nominee in French poetry for Les espions de Dieu

== Works ==
Poetry
- N'importe qu'elle page (1973)
- L'Espace de voir (1974)
- En image de ça (1974)
- Vers mauve (1975)
- D'un corps à l'autre (1976)
- Corps qui suivent (1977)
- Le Sentiment du lieu (1978)
- Les passions du samedi (1979, ISBN 978-2920051010)
- Petit supplément aux passions (1980, ISBN 978-2892728811)
- Monsieur désir (1981, ISBN 978-2892728743)
- La Leçon des ténèbres (1983)
- Les lits de l'Amérique (1983, ISBN 978-2892720020)
- Les sept jours de la jouissance (1984, ISBN 978-2920051195)
- Nuits (1984, ISBN 978-2892720105)
- Action writing (1985, ISBN 9782894191989)
- C'est encore le solitaire qui parle (1986, ISBN 978-2892720273)
- L'Accélérateur d'intensité (1987, ISBN 9782892950540)
- Le Spectacle de l'homme encore visible (1988, ISBN 978-2892720433)
- Les Amoureux n'existent que sur la terre (1990, ISBN 978-2892720594)
- On sait que cela est écrit avant et après la grande maladie (1992, ISBN 9782894190166)
- De la nature des mondes animés et de ceux qui y habitent (1994, ISBN 978-2894190548)
- Le Cœur est un objet noir caché en nous (1995, ISBN 9782894190753)
- Vies (1998, ISBN 9782894191293)
- Nous sommes tous encore vivants (2002, ISBN 9782894191941)
- Professeur de poésie (2003, ISBN 9782894192221)
- Traité du paysage (2005)
- Tout, rien, quelque chose (2007, ISBN 9782894192689)
- Les espions de Dieu (2008, ISBN 9782894192825)
- La saison des fantômes (2011, ISBN 978-2896950379)
- C'est encore nous qui rêvons (2012, ISBN 9782894193280)
- La Très grande solitude de l'écrivain pragois Franz Kafka (2014, ISBN 9782894194218)

Non-fiction

- La vie parallèle (1994, ISBN 978-2894190586)
- 100 films à voir en vidéo (1997, ISBN 9782893815190)
- Dictionnaire du film (1999, ISBN 9782893815435)
- Voyage au pays du cinéma (1999, ISBN 9782894191446)
- Rayon rose (2006, ISBN 9782894192535)
- J'ai toujours appris à écrire (2006, ISBN 9782895831518)
- Dictionnaire général du cinéma (2007, ISBN 9782762127874)

English translations

- The Passions of Mister Desire (1986, ISBN 0-919349-65-X)
- Parallel to Life (2001, ISBN 1-55071-143-1)
