= Katherine L. Gordon =

Canadian poet

Katherine L. Gordon is a Canadian poet with numerous publications to her credit. She lives and writes in the Eramosa River valley near Guelph, Ontario, and also works as an editor, independent publisher and literary critic. Her work has been published internationally in several languages, including Chinese and Hindi.

== Books ==
- 1998: An Impact of Butterflies, Independent, ISBN 978-0-9682733-0-2
- 2000: Saving Camelot, Independent, ISBN 978-0-9682733-2-6
- 2005: October: from Confederation to contemporary - Canadian poets write of October (Editor)Poetry and Good Cheer Press ISBN (missing)
- 2006: Restless Spring: from Confederation to contemporary - Canadian poets write of Spring (Editor)Poetry and Good Cheer Press ISBN (missing)
- 2008: Translating Shadows, Craigleigh Press, ISBN 978-0-9809257-1-5
- 2009: In Moonlight the Sky Will Slide (with Helen Bar-Lev), Cyclamens and Swords (Israel), ISBN 978-965-7503-00-3
- 2010: Portals (with Stanley J. White & Becky D. Alexander), Craigleigh Press, ISBN 978-0-9809257-3-9
- 2011: Spirit Valley Rambles: in the company of poets (Editor) Valley Poets ISBN 0-9682733-7-8
- 2013: Telling Lies (with S.J. White) Cyclamens and Swords Publishing (Israel) ISBN 978-965-7503-15-7

== Selected chapbooks ==
- 2002: Moon Flares (with I.B. Iskov)
- 2004: Space Alchemy (with I.B. Iskov and Joan McGuire)
- 2005: How to Dance Naked in the Moonlight (with Lenny Everson)
- 2005: A Conjunction of Hearts: A Renga (with Joan McGuire)
- 2007: Coast Lines (with Trish Shields) ISBN 978-0-9682733-8-8
- 2007: Feast of Equinix (Anthology) edited by K. Gordon ISBN 978-0-9784882-1-5
- 2008: Seven by Seven Dreams (with Stanley J. White)
- 2008: A Week of Thoughts (with Stanley J. White)
