= Nadine McInnis =

Canadian author

Nadine McInnis is a Canadian author of poetry, short stories and essays.

== Biography ==
McInnis was born in Belleville, Ontario in September, 1957, and grew up in Toronto and Ottawa. She attended Colonel By Secondary School, where she began a lifelong friendship with the novelist, playwright and actor Ann-Marie MacDonald. She studied English literature at the University of Ottawa, and after spending two years on Thunderchild Reserve, Saskatchewan and another two years on a farm near Livelong, Saskatchewan, she returned to Ottawa. She has two children, Nadia (born 1982) and Owen(born 1988), and is married to Tim Fairbairn.

Among her seven books, Two Hemispheres (Brick Books, Fall 2007) is a book length poetic exploration of illness and health partially inspired by the first medical photographs of women patients of the Surrey County Lunatic Asylum in 1850. Ten photos are included. The book has been shortlisted for two national awards: the 2008 Pat Lowther Award and the 2008 ReLit Award, as well as the regional Archibald Lampman Award for the city of Ottawa.

McInnis' work has appeared in a variety of journals, including The Malahat Review, The New Quarterly, Event, and Room of One's Own. McInnis has published widely in magazines in Canada and is a past winner of a CBC literary award and the Ottawa Book Award. She joined the faculty of Algonquin College in 2006, after working as a policy analyst in the Canadian federal government where she focused on the publishing industries in Canada.
