= Jacob Scheier =

Canadian poet (born 1980)

Jacob Scheier (born February 2, 1980) is a Canadian poet born in Toronto. His debut poetry collection, More to Keep Us Warm, was published by ECW Press in 2007 and was named the winner of the 2008 Governor General's Award for English poetry.

A former resident of New York City, Jacob moved back to his hometown of Toronto in 2010. Scheier published work in a number of Canadian literary magazines and was co-editor of the York University literary magazine Existere prior to publishing More to Keep Us Warm. He is the son of poet Libby Scheier. He is also a regular contributor to the Toronto alternative weekly NOW. He is currently preparing to teach a course on writing creatively about grief at Ryerson University's School of Continuing Education.
