= Edythe Morahan de Lauzon =

Canadian poet

Edythe Morahan de Lauzon was a Canadian poet. She is possibly best known for her poem collection Angels' Songs from the Golden City of the Blessed published in 1918, and From The Kingdom Of The Stars in 1922. Inspired by the First World War, she engaged in issues concerning war and German nationalism in her poems. She lived in Quebec and was a committed Christian and spiritualist.

== See also ==
- Canadian literature
- List of Canadian poets
