= Marie Uguay =

Marie Uguay (April 22, 1955 – October 26, 1981) was a French Canadian poet from the province of Quebec. Her first book of poetry was Signe et rumeur (1976).

She was born in the former town of Ville-Émard. It has become a district of the city of Montreal.

Diagnosed with bone cancer, Uguay had to have her right leg amputated at the age of 21. She was still studying literature at the Université du Québec à Montréal in literature. She died of cancer at the age of 26, on October 26, 1981.

A cultural center in Ville-Émard was named for Uguay after her death. It still operates to day and also includes a public library.

== Childhood ==
She was named 'Marie Lalonde at birth but eventually took her maternal grandfather's surname in his honor. He was a violin teacher, an amateur in literature, and she viewed him as a role model.

She began writing very early, first stories for her pleasure. Soon she began writing poetry, appreciating how full of life a text could become through poetic verses.

== Work ==
Uguay's poetry is marked by her reflections on Québec separatism, the feminist movement, and on her illness. The critic Ben Libman has compared Uguay's prodigious brilliance to that of John Keats and Jules Laforgue. He writes "What astonishes about Uguay’s poetry, then, is not the maturity that, despite itself, is youthful but the youthfulness that, despite itself, is mature."

== Bibliography ==
=== Original works ===
- Signe et rumeur (1976)
- L'Outre-vie (1979)
- Autoportraits (1982) (posthumous)
- Journal 2005 (posthumous)

=== Works translated into English ===
- Selected poems (1975-1981) (translated by Daniel Sloate)
