= Steven McCabe =

Canadian visual artist and poet

Steven McCabe is a Kansas City, Missouri-born American-Canadian visual artist and poet. He is the author of five books of poetry, most recently Hierarchy of Loss (Ekstasis Editions 2007).

He recently illustrated a children's book of Victorian Fairy Tales; The Golden Key by George Macdonald (P.D. Meany 2008) with fine-line ink drawings. He has created public murals and exhibited paintings, mixed media and collaborative artworks. He regularly performs public readings of his poetry sharing the stage with dancers, musicians and multimedia presentations featuring his artwork.

Most recently he performed with the Blue Room blues band as part of National Poetry Month 2008. McCabe's teaching experience includes The Ontario Arts Council Artists in Education program, Learning Through the Arts (Royal Conservatory of Music), Inner City Angels, Arts for Children of Toronto, the Toronto Board of Education and the League of Canadian Poets. McCabe has over 20 years of teaching experience.

== Published books ==
- Hierarchy of Loss ISBN 978-1-894800-94-5 Ekstasis Editions 2007 93 pp
- Orpheus and Eurydice: Before the Descent (Co-authored with Tannaz Nanavati) ISBN 1-897275-19-6 LyricalMyrical Books 2006 32 pp
- Jawbone ISBN 1-894800-32-X Ekstasis Editions 2005 91 pp
- Radio Picasso ISBN 1-894205-03-0 WatershedBooks 1999 88 pp
- Wyatt Earp in Dallas: 1963 ISBN 0-9699639-0-4 Seraphim Editions 1996 79 pp
