= W. T. Pfefferle =

Canadian author and poet (born 1962)

W.T. Pfefferle is a Canadian author and poet born in 1962 in Winnipeg, Manitoba, Canada, but who was based in Texas for many years.

He's the author of five books. The most recent is My Coolest Shirt, published in April 2015 by The Word Works Press. His early poetry collection, The Meager Life and Modest Times of Pop Thorndale, won the Stevens Poetry Manuscript Prize in 2007.

He has worked as a college professor, as the Director of Expository Writing at the Johns Hopkins University in Baltimore, Maryland, and more recently as a tenured professor at Georgetown College. He co-authored Plug In: The Guide to Music on the Internet with Ted M. Gurley, a media executive in Texas. Pfefferle also wrote Writing What Matters, a collegiate writing textbook. In 2004, Pfefferle published Poets on Place, the story of his year-long trip around America interviewing and photographing American poets: Mark Strand, Rita Dove, Denise Duhamel, Charles Wright, Mark Wunderlich, Henry Taylor, David St. John, and Nikki Giovanni.
