= Theodore Harding Rand =

Canadian educator and poet (1835–1900)

Theodore H Rand
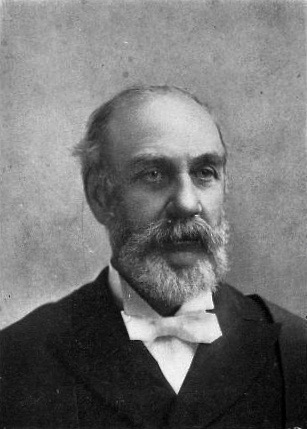
- Born: Theodore Harding Rand; 8 February 1835; Canard, Nova Scotia, British North American
- Died: 29 May 1900 (aged 65); Fredericton, New Brunswick, Canada
- Education: Acadia College
- Occupations: educator and poet
- Spouse: Emeline Augusta Eaton
- Parent(s): Thomas Woodworth Rand; Eliza Irene Barnaby

Theodore Harding Rand (8 February 1835 – 29 May 1900) was a Canadian educator and poet.

== Early life ==
He was born 8 February 1835 in Canard, Nova Scotia, to Thomas Woodworth Rand, deacon of First Cornwallis Baptist Church, and Eliza Irene Barnaby. A Baptist, Rand attended Acadia College in Wolfville, Nova Scotia, which had been founded by the Baptist community in 1838. Rand graduated from Acadia College in 1860.

== Career ==
Upon graduation, Rand became Professor of Classics at the Provincial Normal School in Truro, Nova Scotia. Working at a normal school, which was charged with training future teachers, Rand soon developed an interest in education policy. He became interested in the common school movement and travelled to Great Britain and the United States to study the common school phenomenon. He began to advocate common schools for Nova Scotia and produced writings and lectures on the topic. He also married Emeline Augusta Eaton on 5 November 1861 in Canard.

Rand's advocacy proved successful in 1864, when the government of Nova Scotia, led by Conservative Premier Charles Tupper passed legislation creating a common school system for Nova Scotia. Tupper appointed Rand as Nova Scotia's first Superintendent of Education, and Rand oversaw the creation of Nova Scotia's public education system.

In 1871, New Brunswick, under the leadership of the Liberal-Conservative premier, George Edwin King, passed the Common Schools Act to create a series of common schools in New Brunswick. Upon King's invitation, Rand became New Brunswick's first Superintendent of Education and oversaw the creation of public education in New Brunswick. Rand meanwhile continued his own education and became a Doctor of Civil Law from Acadia College in 1874.

== Later life ==
Rand left the world of public education in 1883, when he became Professor of History and Didactics at Acadia College. In 1885, he moved to Toronto to take a position at the Toronto Baptist College (created in 1881 through funding provided by William McMaster). In 1886, he moved to Woodstock, Ontario to become college president of the Baptist Woodstock College. In 1890, the Baptist Convention of Ontario and Quebec voted to merge Toronto Baptist College and Woodstock College. The merged university was named McMaster University in honour of William McMaster's financial support. Rand served as chancellor of McMaster University from 1892 to 1895.

== Sources ==
- Margaret Conrad, "'An Abiding Conviction of the Paramount Importance of Christian Education': Theodore Harding Rand as Educator, 1860-1900," in Robert S. Wilson, ed., An Abiding Conviction: Maritime Baptists and Their World (Saint John: Acadia Divinity College and the Baptist Historical Committee, 1988), pp. 155–95
- Barry Moody, "'The Trail of the Serpent': The Appointment of a 'Professor of Didactics' at Acadia College, 1883", in Historical Identities: The Professoriate in Canada, ed. Paul Stortz & E. Lisa Panayotidis (2006)
