= Trish Shields =

Trish Shields is a Canadian poet and novelist.

Born in Canada, Shields grew up in Europe before returning to live in Toronto, Ontario.

Shields is the British Columbia chairperson for the Canadian Poetry Association and an associate member of the League of Canadian Poets, Canada Cuba Literary Alliance and Canadian Federation of Poets. Her first book, Soul Speak, was nominated for a Lambda Literary Award.

She lives on Vancouver Island with her spouse and children.

== Bibliography ==
- Soul Speak (2001) ISBN 1-930928-71-8
- "A Time of Trial" (2001) ISBN 1-894553-30-6
- Spirit Harvest (2002) ISBN 0-9716812-8-7
- Inferno (2003) ISBN 0-9728450-1-1
- "Infinite Pleasures" (2004) ISBN 1-933113-00-6
- "Sharing the Dark" (2005) ISBN 0-9737351-4-7
- "Elan, a Regina Weese Collection" (2005) ISBN 0-9735977-0-4
- "The Future Looks Bright" (2006) ISBN 0-9732762-7-4
- "Washing the Color of Water Golden" (2006) ISBN 1-933242-23-X
- "Boomerang" (2006) ISBN 0-9689799-7-1
- Harvesting Treasures (2006) ISBN 0-9738671-0-8 (editor)
- "Taj Mahal Review" (2006) ISSN 0972-6004
