= Beverley Daurio =

Canadian writer and editor

Beverley Daurio (born 1953) is a Canadian writer and editor. Formerly editor-in-chief of Poetry Canada Review and editor and publisher of Paragraph: the Canadian Fiction Review (formerly Cross Canada Writers Quarterly owned by Ted Plantos), she is currently editor-in-chief of The Mercury Press. Books edited by Beverley Daurio have won or been shortlisted for numerous awards, including the Governor General's Award, City of Toronto Book Award, Books in Canada First Novel Award, the Arthur Ellis Award from the Crime Writers of Canada, and many others. Her short fiction has been published in Canada, Australia, the United States, Romania, and England, and her poetry, reviews, and literary essays have been widely published (including The Globe and Mail, Books in Canada, The Malahat Review and many other venues. If Summer Had a Knife was shortlisted for the Gerald Lampert Award. She has served on the boards of directors of various organizations, including the Literary Press Group and the Book and Periodical Council, and has been the recipient of grants in writing from the Canada Council for the Arts, the Ontario Arts Council, and the Toronto Arts Council, as well as the Barbara Deming Memorial Award (US). She was a founder of the Canadian Poetry Association in 1985.She has designed and taught creative writing courses at George Brown College, the Kingston School of Writers, and This Ain't the Rosedale Library, as well as run day-long workshops for high-school students, and has attended writing residencies in Canada and the United States (most recently at the Atlantic Centre for the Arts in Florida, studying with Master Artist William Gass). In multidisciplinary art, she has worked with choreographer and dancer Sheila Muir, choreographer Ted Fox, and with visual artist Sheila Gregory.

== Bibliography ==
- 1987:If Summer Had a Knife
- 1988:Love and Hunger (editor)
- 1988:Justice
- 1988:Ink and Strawberries (edited with Luise von Flowtow)
- 1990:Hard Times (editor)
- 1990:His Dogs
- 1992:Hell & Other Novels
- 1992:Internal Document
- 1998:The Power to Bend Spoons: Interviews with Canadian Novelists (editor)
- 2000:Dream Elevators: Interviews with Canadian Poets (editor)
- 2001:Sex: An Anthology, Vivid: Stories by Five Women (edited with Anna Rumley)
- 2007:The Closets of Time (edited with Richard Truhlar) ISBN 978-1-55128-133-9

== See also ==
- Canadian literature
- Canadian poetry
- List of Canadian poets
- List of Canadian writers
