= Lisa Richter =

Canadian poet

- Born: 1977 (age 48–49)
- Education: Brock University; University of Guelph
- Occupations: Poet, writer, educator
- Writing career
- Notable awards: National Jewish Book Award for Poetry (2020); Canadian Jewish Literary Award for Poetry

Lisa Richter (born c. 1977) is a Canadian poet. She has written two books. Her book Nautilus and Bone won the 2020 National Jewish Book Award for poetry.

== Work ==
Richter lives in Toronto. Her first book, Closer to Where We Began, was published in 2017. Her 2020 book Nautilus and Bone: An Auto/biography in Poems is about the life of Yiddish-language feminist poet Anna Margolin. It is dedicated to her father, who is of Russian-Jewish origins, and who died in 2018. The material began forming in her mind during her mourning for him. She began writing the book while attending the Sage Hill Poetry Colloquium, a writers' retreat in Saskatchewan. The book won the Berru Poetry Award from the Jewish Book Council for 2020.
