= Zachariah Wells =

Canadian poet and writer (born 1976)

Zachariah Wells (born 10 September 1976) is a Canadian poet, critic, essayist, and editor.

Wells was born Charlottetown, Prince Edward Island, and was raised in the rural community of Hazel Grove. He attended high school in Ottawa, Ontario, and university in Halifax, Nova Scotia. As an undergraduate, he spent summers working in Iqaluit, Nunavut, as an airline cargo handler. After a brief stint at graduate school in Montreal, Quebec, he returned to Iqaluit in 2001 and then to the remote settlement of Resolute, on Cornwallis Island until 2003, eventually relocating to Halifax with his wife, Rachel Lebowitz.

Wells has contributed to periodicals including Books in Canada, Quill & Quire and Maisonneuve. His first chapbook of poems, Fool's Errand, was published in 2004 as well as his full-length collection of Arctic poems, Unsettled.

In 2006, Wells became the Reviews Editor for Canadian Notes & Queries. In 2007, he published Sealift, a CD recording of 24 poems from Unsettled; "Achromatope," a letterpress broadside; and After the Blizzard, a limited edition chapbook. In the spring of 2008, Jailbreaks, his anthology of Canadian sonnets, was published. Anything But Hank!, the children's book he co-wrote with Lebowitz, with illustrations by Eric Orchard, was published in the fall. In 2009, Wells published Track & Trace, his second trade collection of poems, with illustrations by renowned graphic artist Seth. Track & Trace was shortlisted for the 2010 Atlantic Poetry Prize. In 2010, he published The Essential Kenneth Leslie, the first collection of Leslie's poems to be published since 1972.

== Bibliography ==
- Fool's Errand (chapbook), Charlottetown: Saturday Morning Chapbooks, 2004
- Unsettled (trade paperback), Toronto: Insomiac Press, 2004
- Ludicrous Parole (chapbook), Montreal: Mercutio Press, 2005
- Huginn & Muninn (lithographed broadside, in collaboration with Margaret Flood), Halifax: privately printed, 2005.
- Sealift (audio CD), Vancouver: Avatar Records, 2007.
- Achromatope (letterpress broadside), Victoria: Frog Hollow Press, 2007.
- After the Blizzard (chapbook), Peterborough: Littlefishcart Press, 2008.
- Jailbreaks: 99 Canadian Sonnets (anthology, as editor) Emeryville: Biblioasis, 2008.
- Anything But Hank! (children's book, co-written with Rachel Lebowitz, illustrated by Eric Orchard) Emeryville: Biblioasis, 2008. LCCN 2010-497027
- Track & Trace (trade paperback), Emeryville: Biblioasis, 2009.
- The Essential Kenneth Leslie (as editor) Erin: The Porcupine's Quill, 2010.
