= List of Canadian provincial poets laureate =

This is a list of provincial poets laureate in Canada. Currently, only the provinces of Ontario, Prince Edward Island, Saskatchewan and Yukon have appointed a poet laureate.

== Ontario ==
In 2021 Ontario named its first poet laureate Randell Adjei.

- Randell Adjei (2021-2024)
- Matthew-Ray Jones (2024-present)

== Prince Edward Island ==
Prince Edward Island appointed its first poet laureate, John Smith, in 2003.

- John Smith (2002–2004)
- Frank Ledwell (2004–2007)
- David Helwig (2008–2009)
- Hugh MacDonald (2009–2013)
- Diane Hicks Morrow (2013–2016)
- Deirdre Kessler (2016–2019)
- Julie Pellissier-Lush (2019–2023)
- Tanya Davis (2023-present)

== Saskatchewan ==
Saskatchewan appointed its first poet laureate, Glen Sorestad, in 2000.

- Glen Sorestad (2000–2004)
- Louise Bernice Halfe (Sky Dancer) (2005–2006)
- Robert Currie (2007–2010)
- Don Kerr (2011–2013)
- Judith Krause (2014–2015)
- Gerry Hill (2016–2017)
- Brenda Schmidt (2017–2018)
- Bruce Rice (2019–2021)
- Carol Rose GoldenEagle (2021–present)

== Yukon ==
Inaugural Yukon Provincial Poet Laureate PJ Yukon has held the office since 1994.

== See also ==
- Poet Laureate of Toronto
- Canadian Parliamentary Poet Laureate
- Municipal poets laureate in Alberta
- Municipal poets laureate in British Columbia
- Municipal poets laureate in Ontario
