= Kodak Building =

Kodak Building may refer to:

- Kodak Building (Atlanta), a building in Atlanta
- Kodak Building 9, a building in Toronto
- Kodak Heights, an industrial park in Toronto
- Kodak House, an art deco building in Dublin
- Kodak Tower, a skyscraper in Rochester, New York
