= Danzig Street shooting =

2012 mass shooting in Toronto, Canada

- Location: 43.7645°N 79.1829°W; West Hill, Toronto, Ontario, Canada
- Date: 16 July 2012; 14 years ago 10:40 pm (UTC−4)
- Attack type: Mass shooting
- Weapons: 9 mm pistol; .40 calibre pistol; Uzi submachine-gun
- Deaths: 2
- Injuries: 24 (including 2 perpetrators)
- Perpetrators: Galloway Boys, Le Side Crew
- Assailants: Folorunso Owusu, Nahom Tsegazab, and an unidentified gunman
- Motive: Gang rivalry
- Convicted: Shaquan Mesquito, Folorunso Owusu, Nahom Tsegazab, Naod Tsegazab

The Danzig Street shooting, or Danzig shooting, was a gang-related shooting that occurred on the evening of 16 July 2012 at a block party on Danzig Street in the West Hill neighbourhood of Toronto, Canada. Rival gang members Folorunso Owusu, 17, and Nahom Tsegazab, 19, along with an unidentified third gunman, opened fire in a crowd of two hundred people. This resulted in the deaths of Joshua Yasay and Shyanne Charles, and the injury of twenty-four others (including two of the perpetrators), making it the worst mass shooting in Toronto. (Note: The 2018 Danforth shooting had a lower overall number of shooting victims, at sixteen, including the deaths of two victims and the single perpetrator. This incident would fit some definitions for a spree shooting as it occurred over several blocks and ended in suicide.)

A 2008 provincial report had warned of increasing trends in youth violence but key recommendations to stop at-risk youth from joining gangs had not been adopted. Around 2010 the West Hill-based Galloway Boys gang was re-forming, recruiting youths who obtained guns which they used in conflicts for control of the gang and territory. The block party, which began as a children's barbecue at a social-housing complex, was continued into the evening by some of these youths who attracted a crowd with a DJ and free alcohol. After a series of confrontations, threats escalated into the shooting.

Although initially believed to be the resumption of a 2003 gang war between the Galloway Boys and the Malvern Crew, it later became clear that the Danzig Street shooting was not part of a territorial dispute or retaliation for another incident but a disagreement between teenagers who then had a gunfight at a party. Police initially received few tips from frightened witnesses but were able to make two arrests that month; two additional arrests came following a reprisal shooting in September. The four young men convicted were aged 15 to 19 at the time of the shooting; two were minors and their names were withheld under the Youth Criminal Justice Act until they were sentenced as adults. Justice Ian Nordheimer said of the incident, "Ordinary persons do not understand how anyone, much less teenagers, can come not only to possess such weapons but to use them in such a brutal and indifferent way."

The incident, in conjunction with the Eaton Centre shooting six weeks earlier and a shooting in a Colorado movie theatre four days later, renewed debate on gun crime in urban areas. Despite falling national crime rates, a poll taken the following week showed that a majority of Canadians were in fear of "a violent crime wave". The shooting led the Toronto Police Service to develop new crime-prevention strategies for the Neighbourhood Officers Program, established to build community relationships in at-risk areas to gain information on local crime, making possible targeted crackdowns on gang activity and a dramatic reduction in shootings and other crimes. Police 43 Division (which includes Danzig Street) reported no homicides the following year, in 2013.

== Background ==
The Galloway Boys (a.k.a. G-Way) were one of the most well-known and violent criminal gangs in Toronto, their turf centered on the intersection of Galloway and Kingston Roads in the neighbourhood of West Hill. They raised fears of violence in the city's eastern district of Scarborough in 2003 and 2004 while battling with rival gang the Malvern Crew over territory for street drugs and prostitution. The deadly turf war resulted in Ontario's largest street-gang crackdown and prosecutions, with 75 arrests of alleged gang members on more than 600 criminal charges.

With the Galloway Boys' leadership incarcerated, (Note: Of the suspected Galloway Boys arrested in 2004, all but four were remanded into custody until hearings began in 2007.) there was a notable decrease in violent crime. However, many of those gang leaders had been sentenced to five- or seven-year jail terms; when they were released around 2010, they began mentoring youths recruited into the gang. The younger members obtained guns and used them in conflicts for control of the gang and territory, resulting in a string of shootings and killings in 2011 and 2012. From January to September 2012 there was a 22 percent increase in shooting incidents and a 41 percent increase in shooting victims in the city compared to the same period in 2011.

Kingston–Galloway had been identified in 2004 as one of thirteen areas of poverty and substandard city services designated as priority investment neighbourhoods in Toronto's Strong Neighbourhoods Strategy. The plan sought to counter gang involvement and improve economic opportunities under a citizenship model of governance. It lost political support following the retirement of Mayor David Miller in 2010 and was effectively dismantled in early 2012. (Note: The Strong Neighbourhoods Strategy was based on Neighbourhood Renewal Programmes in the UK. It was replaced in 2012 by Toronto Strong Neighbourhoods Strategy 2020, which no longer targeted poverty, racism, or lack of opportunities for youth, and did not consult with the communities.)

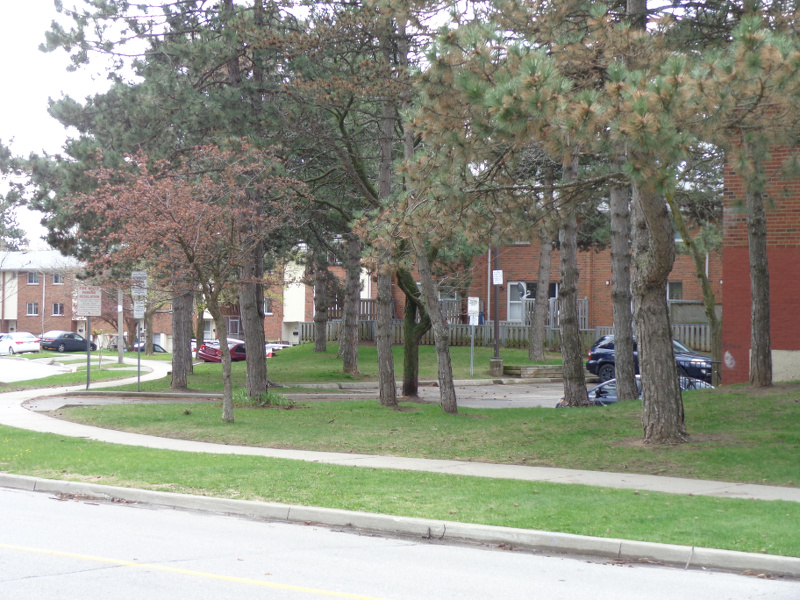
Morningside-Coronation housing complex viewed from Danzig Street, 2018

In Toronto, blockos are a form of block party derived from a Caribbean practice of open-air social gatherings. They are held by neighbours and outreach workers, particularly during the city's warm, humid summers. These parties provide inexpensive entertainment for residents, with daytime activities focused on children and evening activities for youths and adults. Since the 1970s many blockos have been held each year at Toronto Community Housing Corporation (TCHC) developments without incident.

The 101-unit townhouse social housing complex at Danzig Street and Morningside Avenue is called Morningside Coronation by TCHC and D-Block by the young families who reside there. Alcohol is prohibited in common areas without a special-occasion permit. There is a strict no-gun policy: anyone caught with a gun is turned over to police, and tenants caught housing someone with a gun are evicted.

== Event ==
=== Block party ===
A block party was organized at the Danzig Street housing complex for 15 July 2012 by resident Shannon Longshaw, a 28-year-old mother of two, as an afternoon children's barbecue. Meanwhile, from 7 July the Twitter account @2ToneShorty, linked to 19-year-old Galloway Boys member Nahom Tsegazab, had been promoting the gathering as a "Hennessy Block Party". The messages promised a live DJ and thirty bottles of Hennessy cognac on ice, free for all. Over the course of a week, more than two dozen open invitations were sent from the account and spread across social media as #hennessyblockparty. Some residents made Twitter posts expressing concerns over the potential for violence.

The party, which was delayed to Monday 16 July due to a rainstorm, began in Longshaw's backyard at 2 pm. Tenants provided food and children's activities, including face painting and an improvised water slide. Tsegazab handed out school supplies and basketballs. The children's party was to end at 5 pm, but by then adults were already assembling in the parking lot, and the Galloway Boys "took ownership" of the block. By 7 pm a crowd was gathering and alcohol was being consumed to loud hip hop music. An hour later there were Jaguars and Hummers parked around the block, marijuana smoke in the air, (Note: Recreational use of cannabis was not legalized in Canada until October 2018.) and more than two hundred people packing the complex's narrow internal lane (or laneway). Worried about the presence of people they did not know, some residents took their children inside their homes. One resident could not use the walkway without bumping into people, describing it as being like a jammed nightclub.

Several noise complaints were made to police, and bicycle patrols were dispatched, but the party was allowed to continue. According to Gene Jones, then-CEO of TCHC, the event had not been sanctioned by TCHC and should have ended before 9 pm.

=== Provocations ===
The crowd in the complex's lane was filling in when the Galloway Boys began "G-checking", confronting people they did not recognize and telling those from rival gang territories to leave. 18-year-old Shaquan Mesquito of Malvern, an alleged Malvern Crew member known as "Bam Bam", who had come to the party unarmed, was ordered to leave by Tsegazab's 15-year-old brother Naod. Naod threatened to shoot Mesquito if he did not leave immediately.

Angry at being forced to leave, Mesquito sent out a number of Twitter posts urging others to go on a killing spree and shoot up the party. Shortly after 9 pm, Nahom Tsegazab was warned about these threats. Tsegazab then armed himself with a .40 calibre pistol and told others to be prepared for a possible shootout.

=== Shooting ===
Folorunso Owusu, a 17-year-old member of a gang called the Le Side Crew (Note: The gang's name is from the Chester Le Boulevard neighbourhood and TCHC complex.) arrived at the party and was confronted by Nahom Tsegazab, who displayed a handgun and challenged Owusu to fight if he did not leave. At approximately 10:40 pm, less than two minutes after arriving at the party, Owusu opened fire with a 9 mm handgun, shooting Tsegazab twice. He was hit once in the right biceps and once in the abdomen; one of the bullets passed through Tsegazab and injured a bystander. Tsegazab fell to the ground in front of 207 Danzig Street and reached for his gun, "recklessly" firing eleven rounds at Owusu, who retreated through the crowd. One of these bullets struck Owusu in the leg. A third shooter, who remains unidentified, fired fourteen rounds from an Uzi submachine-gun into the crowd.

Twenty-four bystanders were shot, two fatally, and three people were trampled by the panicked crowd (including a pregnant woman). (Note: There are some discrepancies between sources as to the number of people shot. The reporting of victims by early sources was problematic as the identities of the shooters were unknown or could not be published. Many sources from 2012 note 2 killed and 23 wounded. A hospital report from 2013 notes 2 killed and 24 wounded in the shooting, which is consistent with the aggravated assault charges filed against Mesquito and Nahom Tsegazab, and a report at Tsegazab's 2014 sentencing of the number of bystanders injured. A list of 22 wounded (including Owusu but not Tsegazab) was published by the Toronto Star with an additional shooting victim coming forward in a 2017 interview.) The shooting victims were aged 22 months to 33 years. Shyanne Charles, 14, was fleeing from the initial gunfire when she ran into the line of fire of the third shooter. She was struck by several bullets and collapsed and died on the doorstep of 203 Danzig Street. Joshua Yasay, 23, a community mentor with an honours degree in criminology who aspired to be a police officer, was shot by a bullet that pierced his heart and lungs. It has not been determined whether Tsegazab or the third shooter killed him.

== Aftermath and initial arrests ==
The injured were taken to five area hospitals by sixteen ambulances and an emergency medical services bus. This was the first occasion that Sunnybrook Hospital's trauma centre – then the largest of its kind in Canada – declared a Code Orange for mass casualties with almost a hundred staff involved in the response. In May 2015 a team of paramedics were honoured for their actions during the shooting.

Investigators found more than 25 fired shell casings at the scene and recovered five firearms. Thirty alcohol bottles were picked up after the shooting. Police, community workers, and the media suspected that the shooting was between members of the Galloway Boys and the Malvern Crew, having anticipated a violent clash as some senior members of the rival gangs had been released from prison. This belief was reinforced when, two and a half hours after the shooting on Danzig Street, there was a shooting at another TCHC complex on Whiteleas Avenue, 10 km (6.2 mi) away. Two bullets were fired through the front window of the house where Mesquito lived with his mother. No one was injured.

On 19 July, while being treated at hospital, Nahom Tsegazab was charged with reckless discharge of a firearm in relation to the Danzig Street shooting. The following day about a thousand people participated in a memorial march for Charles and Yasay. Mesquito was arrested on 27 July for two counts of uttering threats to cause serious bodily harm at the block party. At the time of his arrest, Mesquito had been carrying a loaded .22 calibre revolver for which he was charged with nine weapons-related offences. Within twelve days of his arrest, Mesquito's family were evicted by TCHC for a lease violation.

In the search for gunmen, police executed a series of vehicle inspections, checks on parolees, and search warrants in the week of 29 July – 4 August, during the course of which more than twenty firearms and hundreds of rounds of ammunition were seized. There were concerns about violence during the 4 August Caribana parade, which attracts one million people, and which had been the site of a fatal shooting in 2011. Hundreds of additional officers were deployed and police announced no serious incidents at the parade.

=== Social media ===
Initial reports from the shooting came via Twitter posts from witnesses and victims. Within hours of the shooting, Twitter was flooded with posts warning that a possible relative of Charles would seek out those responsible. "This is just the beginning. Touched the wrong people," read another message. Police also looked into whether a rap video posted two days before the shooting may have been related. As part of the investigation, police went through thousands of text messages and intercepted phone calls to rebuild the sequence of events. Among these messages were several in which Mesquito claimed responsibility for the shooting.

== Investigation and later arrests ==
Police were met with silence in many areas as they asked for witnesses to come forward, receiving few tips despite so many people having been witnesses to, or victims of, the events. The investigation gained momentum within a few weeks while the Summer Safety Initiative was launched to confront gangs and violence, putting officers on foot patrol in high-crime areas. Officers built relationships with residents of those communities, where some had a historic distrust of police and fears of gang retaliation.

A related shooting occurred on 2 September at a TCHC townhouse complex on Chester Le Boulevard. Naod Tsegazab had tracked down Owusu to retaliate for trying to kill his brother, Nahom. Naod found Owusu riding a bicycle and shot him in the upper thigh. Owusu fell and Naod approached and aimed down to shoot Owusu in the head but the gun had jammed. Owusu fled and was taken to hospital. As a result of the shooting, a search warrant was carried out on Owusu's Chester Le Boulevard home, leading to cocaine trafficking charges being laid on 3 September. On 4 September, a search warrant was executed at Naod's home and Naod was charged with 16 offences including weapon and cocaine charges and the attempted murder of Owusu.

The first murder charge of the Danzig Street shooting investigation was made against Mesquito on 7 November. He was charged with the attempted murder of Nahom Tsegazab, two counts of first-degree murder and 23 counts of aggravated assault. Later that month Nahom Tsegazab was charged with two counts of second-degree murder and 22 counts of aggravated assault. Owusu was arraigned with similar charges at the end of November. As the fourth person charged in connection with the Danzig Street shooting, Naod was charged on 4 December with threatening death and weapons offences but not murder.

On 23 January 2015, the murder and assault charges against Mesquito were dropped after police uncovered evidence that he was in an apartment building 9 kilometres (5.6 mi) away at the time of the shooting. Mesquito had continued to claim credit for the shooting throughout the thirty months he was in custody. His lawyer suggested that since Mesquito had called for people to shoot up the party, he may have thought people close to him had done it and so took responsibility. In fact, no connection was found between Mesquito and Owusu, who had initiated the shooting. The defence lawyer praised police and the Crown Attorney, and stated that he had never before been involved in a case where law enforcement, the prosecution, and the defence had worked together to uncover the facts.

== Convictions ==
Nahom Tsegazab pleaded guilty on 11 April 2014 to two counts of manslaughter and six counts of aggravated assault, and was sentenced to fourteen years in prison. Tsegazab admitted that in participating in the gunfight he was a party to all the ensuing deaths and injuries. In March 2020 he was granted day parole, which was extended in October for another six months.

Shaquan Mesquito pleaded guilty on 23 January 2015 to counselling to commit murder, possession of a firearm, breach of a prohibition order, and uttering a threat. He was sentenced to nine years in prison (less time served). Although no connection was found to link Mesquito with Owusu, it was determined that Mesquito's threats to revisit the block party and "shoot it up" had put the Galloway Boys on a "hair trigger".

Naod Tsegazab pleaded guilty in 2015 to the attempted murder of Owusu in the 2 September Chester Le Boulevard shooting, carried out in the belief that Owusu had shot his brother. He was sentenced as an adult to seven years in prison. He was released in January 2018.

Folorunso Owusu pleaded not guilty to two counts of second-degree murder, one count of attempted murder against Nahom Tsezagab, two counts of aggravated assault, and one charge of reckless discharging of a firearm. The defence maintained during the seven-week trial that Owusu was innocent and a victim of circumstance, shot while attending the party. The Crown provided a recording of Naod Tsegazab in the courthouse cells identifying Owusu, by nickname, as his brother's shooter. However, Naod testified that he invented the story to look tougher in jail, and Nahom Tsegazab testified that Owusu did not shoot him. Found guilty, Owusu was sentenced as an adult to life in prison on 7 December 2016. None of the bullets Owusu fired had killed anyone, but his actions had initiated the gunfire that killed two and injured twenty-two bystanders. In May 2017 Owusu was found guilty of criminal negligence charges, (Note: Owusu had a second trial for several charges of criminal negligence causing bodily harm, which had been severed (separated) from the murder charges in a pre-trial motion.) and sentenced to four years, to be served concurrently with the life sentence. He was incarcerated at the Roy McMurty Youth Centre (where he had been held since November 2012) and in July 2019 was transferred to an adult prison.

== Effects ==
=== Crime and policing ===
The 16 July Danzig Street shooting was the worst mass shooting in Toronto, and occurred just six weeks after the Eaton Centre shooting. The event made headlines around the world and prompted renewed debate on gun crime in urban areas. Two other deadly shooting incidents in the city followed within three days, and three shootings occurred that Friday night. That same evening a lone gunman opened fire in a Colorado movie theatre, killing twelve.

Although data showed crime was decreasing nationally, a 25–26 July Forum Research poll for the National Post suggested that Canadians believed otherwise. The recent mass shootings and media coverage had a majority fearing "a violent crime wave". Pamela Rutledge, a media researcher studying the psychological impact of news coverage, stated that the apparent randomness of the crimes could lead to this perception. "They really trigger a sense of fear in us because they aren't explainable [...] There's no way of making sense of it or figuring out why it didn't happen to me. So that anxiety accelerates your sense of danger."

The Toronto Police Service established a strong uniform presence at Danzig Street, Kingston–Galloway, and other areas that struggled with gang violence, in an attempt to stop acts of revenge. This was extended with the Summer Safety Initiative, a seven-week program of mandatory overtime that effectively added more than three hundred officers to patrols. The program emphasized "old-school policing", with officers walking street patrols in high-crime areas, building relationships with residents and the community. During those summer weeks, which typically see a spike in shootings and other crime, shooting deaths declined from a seven-year average of 6.4 to 2, with dramatic drops in other violent crime categories. The initiative cost CA$2 million, although Bill Blair, the chief of the Toronto Police Service said it saved money by preventing crimes that are expensive to investigate.

The 2012 Summer Safety Initiative led to crime-prevention strategies and the development in 2013 of the Neighbourhood Officers Program, which focused on high-crime areas in each of Toronto's seventeen police divisions. In the program, officers are dedicated to a specific area for a period of at least two years, shifting away from enforcement-based policing to building relationships with residents, learning of specific issues affecting the communities, and improving intelligence about local crime. The provincially-funded TAVIS (Toronto Anti-violence Intervention Strategy) program saw a similar shift in focus, having faced controversy for a practice of stopping, questioning, and documenting people – a procedure known as carding – which resulted in community distrust.

The shooting brought an offer from Customs and Immigration officers to patrol with Toronto Police in hunts for gunmen. A liaison officer was established so police could quickly obtain immigration information on suspects. Nahom Tsegazab had arrived in Canada as a refugee from Somalia.

Violent crime rates dropped in the year following the shooting, and in 2013 there were no homicides in 43 Division (southeast Scarborough, including Danzig Street), which recorded falling crime rates in every category. Deputy Chief of Police Peter Sloly credited the declining crime rates to several actors: the city, non-profit organizations, volunteers, youth outreach workers, community organizations, and a new victim and witness support program. In 2015 community policing officers reported feeling more welcome and receiving more information from residents, intelligence that allowed police to implement a more "surgical policing model" that was less invasive on the community.

Toronto Police Association President Mike McCormack said of the Danzig Street shooting: "It changed the way we gather intelligence, do investigations and it really brought the whole issue of gang culture and some of the challenges that we have in policing to the forefront."

=== Gang crackdown ===
The Danzig Street shooting generated new intelligence for police of an internal leadership struggle for control of the Galloway Boys and a territorial dispute with the neighbouring Orton Park Boys. Police linked the Galloway Boys to eight shooting incidents between 4 September 2011 and 10 August 2012, including:

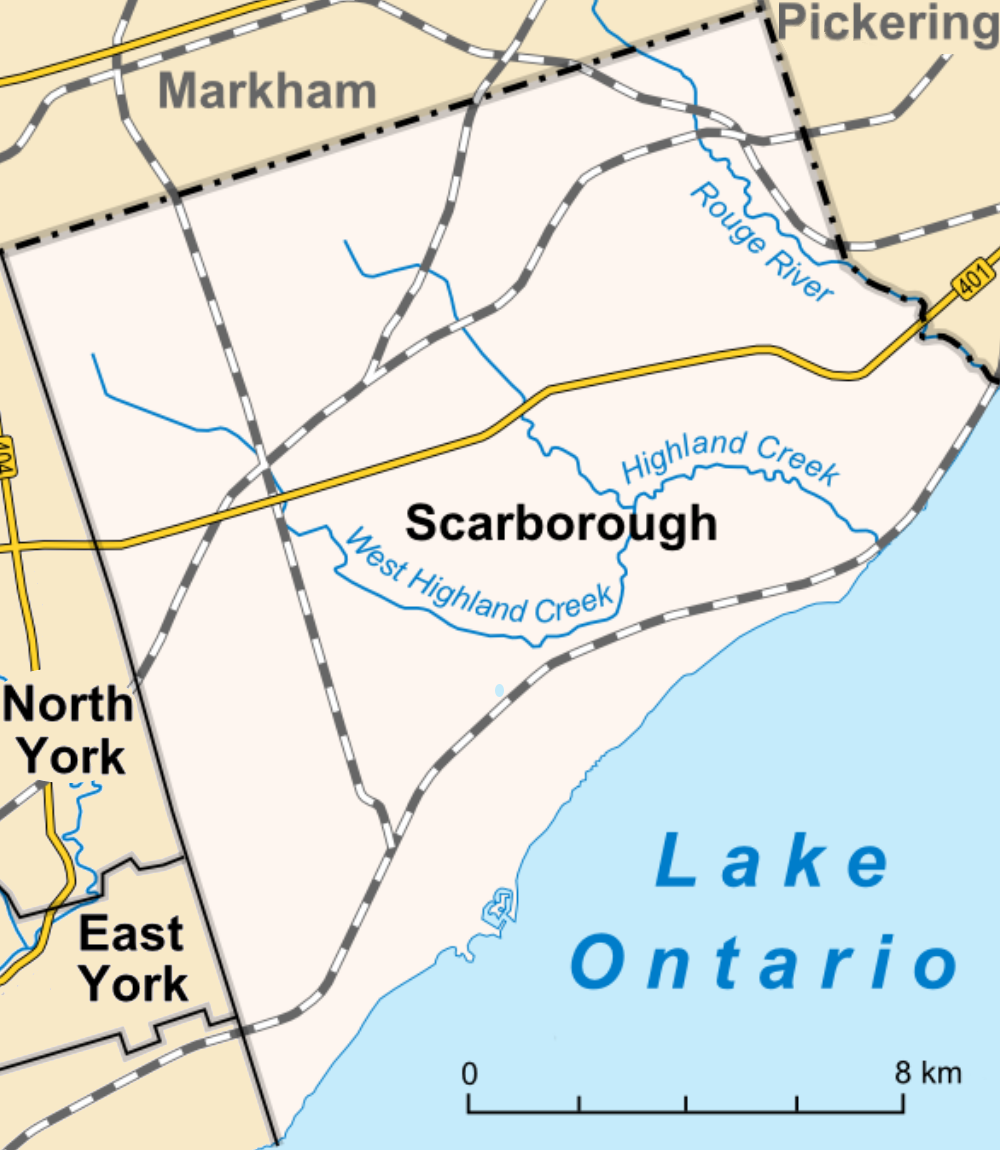
Locations of Danzig Street shooting (red), Whiteleas Ave shooting (blue), Chester Le Blvd shooting (magenta), and other 2011–2012 shootings linked to the Galloway Boys (lime).
- Domino's shooting (4 September 2011) – three men were shot outside a Domino's Pizza parlour at Lawrence Avenue East and Susan Street.
- Northfield Drive shooting (4 November 2011) – a man was shot in the neck and chest during a drug deal on Northfield Drive off of Orton Park Road. Ramon Williams was charged with attempted murder.
- Kingston Road drive-by (28 December 2011) – three young men were shot at 4315 Kingston Road in the territory of the Galloway Boys.
- Murder of D'Mitre Barnaby (30 December 2011) – Barnaby was shot to death in the parking lot of the Susan Towers apartment building at 3847 Lawrence Avenue East, mistaken for the drive-by shooter.
- 3827 Lawrence East shooting (15 January 2012) – several shots were fired on the second floor of an apartment. Blood was found at the scene, but no victim has been identified.
- Danzig Street shooting (16 July 2012)
- 4100 Lawrence East shooting (6 August 2012) – several shots were fired, with no known victims.
- Lawrence LRT shooting (10 August 2012) – one of the emerging leaders of the Galloway Boys was chased through the Lawrence LRT station and gunned down against a fence, surviving with critical injuries.

D'Mitre Barnaby's murder sparked a police crackdown on the Scarborough gangs. Project Brazen was carried out from April to September 2012, resulting in nine arrests, the seizure of five firearms, and attempted murder charges for four shootings. Homicide detectives and officers from Scarborough divisions reviewed the evidence and launched Project Quell in June 2013, identifying seven members of the Orton Park Boys and twenty-five members of the Galloway Boys, charging them with a total of 363 offences. Search warrants were executed on 3 October in Toronto, London, and Waterloo, seizing more than 1 kilogram (2.2 lb) of cocaine and $10,000 in drug proceeds. Project Quell officers confirmed that the Danzig Street investigation triggered investigations into the Galloway Boys and Orton Park.

=== Social programs ===
The Danzig Street shooting brought renewed attention to the 2008 report Roots of Youth Violence commissioned by the Ontario Liberal government following a fatal Toronto high school shooting. (Note: Jordan Manners in May 2007.) The report warned of "deeply troubling" increases in the frequency and severity of youth violence, and addressed children's mental health issues, poverty, racism, education, family issues, the justice system, and a lack of voice for youth. In August 2012 the Liberal government incorporated some of the recommendations in a $20 million action plan to curb youth violence.

Nigerian-born businessman Akanimo Udofiya donated $150,000 to help found Our Space, a community drop-in centre established in a formerly vacant townhouse at 230 Danzig Street. The centre provided after-school programs, a homework club, hot meals for area youth, employment resources, and a base for the Danzig Residents Committee and community outreach programs. Toronto Community Housing donated space for the community hub, evicted one resident in connection with the shooting, and installed new lighting and twenty security cameras in May 2013.

A number of memorial scholarships were created. York University set up the Joshua Yasay Award for excellence in criminology and community service. Two trusts were set up in Shyanne Charles's name, for scholarships starting at the elementary school level.

=== Disenfranchisement of immigrants ===
Mayor Rob Ford called for the Danzig Street shooters to be expelled from the city, saying: "I want these people out of the city. And I'm not going to stop. Not put 'em in jail, then come back and you can live in the city. No. I want 'em out of the city. Go somewhere else. I don't want 'em living in the city anymore." The day after the shooting, he added, "We must use every legal means to make life for these thugs miserable, to put them behind bars, or to run them out of town. We will not rest until being a gang member is a miserable, undesirable life." Ford called for longer prison sentences and decried "hug a thug" social programs; he was the only member of city council to vote against accepting federal grants worth more than $16 million.

Sociologist Paloma Villegas argued that Ford's comments fit an imported crime narrative: positing that the city's criminal activity originated elsewhere, pitting so-called "old stock" Canadians against immigrants. (Note: In the 2016 census, the demographics of Scarborough—Rouge Park, which included Danzig Street, was 52% immigrants and 72% visible minorities.) Immigration minister Jason Kenney agreed with Ford's early comments, stating in the aftermath of the shooting that "foreign gangsters should be deported [without] delay". At the time, the identities and citizenship status of the shooters were unknown. Kenney cited the shooting in parliamentary debate of the Faster Removal of Foreign Criminals Act which empowers the minister to deport permanent residents convicted of a serious crime. The Canadian Bar Association described the majority of the Act's amendments as "excessive, harmful and unnecessary". Amnesty International criticized the Act on humanitarian grounds and for failing to ensure justice under international law. The Act was passed by the Conservative-majority parliament and came into force in June 2013.

In 2013 Ford admitted to smoking crack cocaine and associating with drug dealers. While campaigning for re-election in 2014, Ford visited Danzig Street on the second anniversary of the mass shooting, during which he did not answer questions about his connection to drug dealers. City Councillor Paula Fletcher criticized his attending the event: "You can't have it both ways – you can't be part of it and then crusading to stop it ... You can't technically be condoning guns and gangs and then going out saying how terrible it is that people have been shot and killed."

=== In media ===
Toronto Police Sergeant Rod Chung collaborated with local hip hop artist Promise to reach out to urban youth. With help from artists Kaid and Liya, they released a track titled "Make a Change", inspired by the Danzig Street shooting. Promise wrote the lyrics, which call for taking ownership of the city and an end to violence. The track premiered on 30 September 2012 on CKFG-FM, a black owned and operated commercial radio station, which hosted an on-air town hall meeting to continue discussions between the community, artists, and the police.

The day after the Danzig Street shooting, Toronto-born rapper Drake tweeted his condolences to the families of Yasay and Charles. He rapped about this "one summer day that went horribly wrong" as a featured artist on Snoop Dogg's reggae track "No Guns Allowed":

Told you no guns and you didn't listen
Life is so heavy with that on your soul
Dedicate this to Shyanne and Josh
And pour something out for the lives that they stole

The track premiered live on Conan on 11 March 2013 and was released on 2 April 2013 as a single from Snoop's album Reincarnated.

In response to the shooting, historian Adrian De Leon wrote a book of poetry entitled Rouge (2018). (Note: The name of a Scarborough neighbourhood at the edge of the city.) The collection concludes with two eponymous poems which examine headlines, text messages and soundbites about the shooting and the author's response to the inherent media and political bias. Youth leader Randell Adjei (who subsequently became the first Poet Laureate of Ontario) was inspired by the shooting to found the Scarborough-based RISE (reaching intelligent souls everywhere) spoken word nights.

== See also ==
- Crime in Canada
  - Gangs in Canada
  - Crime in Toronto
    - Boxing Day shooting
    - Toronto Eaton Centre § 2012 shooting – 2 June shooting at a crowded mall food court
    - 2018 Toronto shooting – 22 July shooting on Danforth Avenue
