= Municipal poets laureate in Ontario =

This is a list of municipal poets laureate in the province of Ontario, Canada.

== Barrie ==
The city of Barrie has had four poets laureate Tyneisha Ternent (2022–present), Victoria Butler (2018–2022), Damian Lopes (2014–2018), and Dr. Bruce Meyer (2010–2014).

== Brantford ==
The city of Brantford named John B. Lee poet laureate in perpetuity in 2005.

== Cobalt ==
The town of Cobalt named Ann Margetson poet laureate

== Cobourg ==
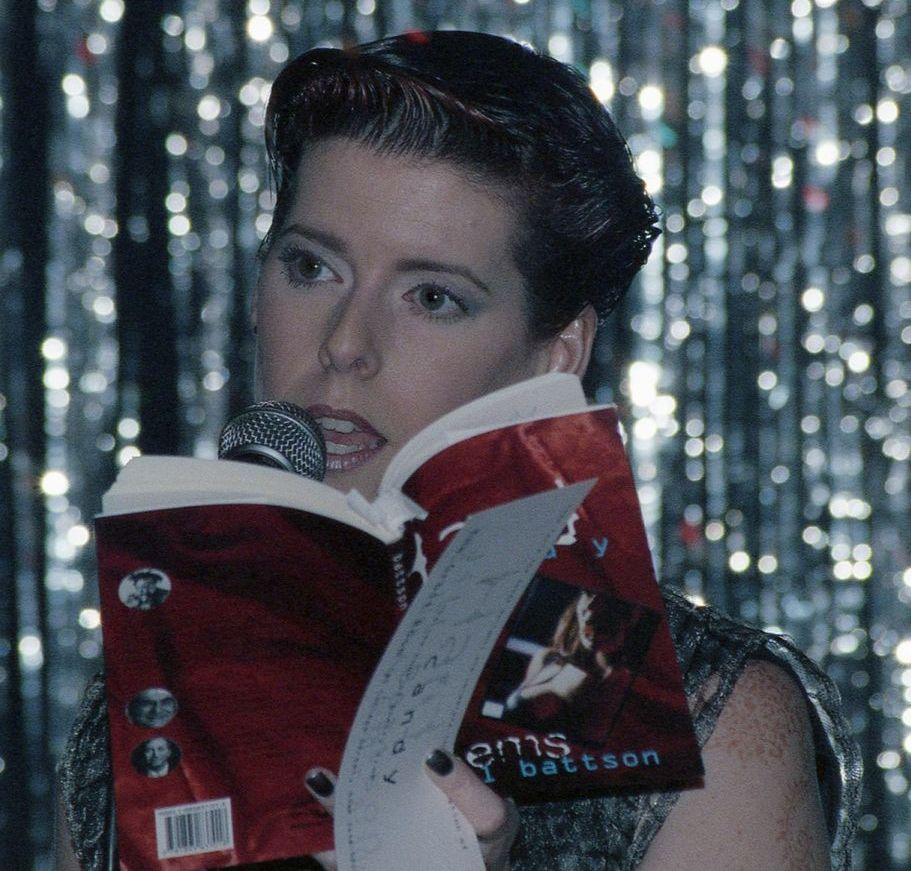
Jill Battson reading from her book « Hard Candy » in 1998 in Toronto.

Cobourg’s poets laureate are Jessica Outram (2019–2022), Ted Amsden (2011–2018), Jill Battson (2009–2011), and Eric Winter (1997–2009).

== Dufferin County ==
Dufferin County's poets laureate is Harry Posner (2017–present)

== Emery ==
Poets laureate of Emery include Laurence Hutchman (2018–present).

== Kingston ==
Kingston’s poets laureate are Sadiqa de Meijer, (2022-2026) Jason Heroux (2019–2022), Helen Humphreys (2015–2019), and Eric Folsom (2011–2015).

== London ==
London’s poets laureate are Tom Cull (2016–present), and Penn Kemp (2011–2013)

== Mississauga ==
Mississauga’s poets laureate program was created in 2015. Poets are required to produce at least three poems for city-determined events annually, and read at civic events. Most serve a 2-year term, with Ayomide Bayowa being assigned the role for 30 months, due to delays in selection due to the COVID-19 pandemic.

- 2015–2017: Anna Yin
- 2017–2019: Wali Shah
- 2019–2021: Paul Edward Costa
- 2021–2024: Ayomide Bayowa

== Norfolk County ==
In Norfolk County, John B. Lee was appointed in 2011.

== Ottawa ==
Ottawa’s poets laureate are Albert Dumont (Anglophone) (2021–2022) and Gilles Latour (Francophone) (2021–2022), Margaret Michèle Cook (Francophone) and Diana Young (Anglophone) (2019–2021), Andrée Lacelle (Francophone) and Jamaal Jackson Rogers (Anglophone) (2017–2019).

== Owen Sound ==
Owen Sound’s poets laureate are Rebecca Diem (2024–2025), Richard-Yves Sitoski (2019–2023), Lauren Best (2017–2019), Rob Rolfe & Larry Jensen (2015–2017), Terry Burns (2013–2014), Kateri Akiwenzie-Damm (2011–2012), Kristan Anderson (2008–2010) and Liz Zetlin (2007–2008).

== Scugog ==
Hollay Ghadery was named the inaugural poet laureate of Scugog in 2023.

== Greater Sudbury ==
Greater Sudbury’s poets laureate have been Roger Nash (2010–2011), Daniel Aubin (2012–2013), Thomas Leduc (2014–2015), Kim Fahner (2016–2018), Chloé LaDuchesse (2018–2020), Vera Constantineau (2020–2022), Kyla Heyming (2022–2024) and Alex Tétreault (2024-present).

Prior to its amalgamation into Greater Sudbury, the old city of Sudbury named Robert L. J. Zenik (1986–1988) as its first and only Poet Laureate.

== Toronto ==
The Poet Laureate of Toronto program was established in 2001, naming Dennis Lee as the first poet laureate. Successors include: A. F. Moritz (2019–2022), Anne Michaels (2016–2019), George Elliott Clarke (2012–2015), Dionne Brand (2009–2012), and Pier Giorgio Di Cicco (2004–2009).

The title of "Poet Laureate of Emery," referring to the Emery Village community in the former borough of North York, was created by then-Councillor Giorgio Mammoliti. Dr. Laurence Hutchman was given the title in 2017.

== Windsor ==
The city of Windsor poets laureate are Mary Ann Mulhern (2019–2022), Marty Gervais (2011–2019), Vanessa Shields (April 2022- September 2022) and Peter Hrastovec (2023–2027).

== Woodstock ==
The city of Woodstock posthumously named Barry C. Butson poet laureate emeritus.

== See also ==
- Poet Laureate of Toronto
- Canadian Parliamentary Poet Laureate
- Municipal poets laureate in Alberta
- Municipal poets laureate in British Columbia
