= Five Point Generalz =

- Founded: Late 1990s
- Founding location: Toronto, Ontario, Canada
- Territory: Mount Dennis, Toronto
- Criminal activities: Drug trafficking, weapon trafficking, robbery

The Five Point Generalz, often shortened to 5PGz or 5PG, are a street gang based in Toronto, Ontario, Canada.

== History ==
The Five Point Generalz gang originates from two high-rise buildings known as "The Twin Towers" in the area of Weston Road and Lawrence Avenue West. The gang was created in the late 1990s by five original members nicknamed "the five generals", from which the gang's name is based. The original five members then grew their gang by recruiting other local gangsters in Toronto's west end Mount Dennis neighborhood, as well as other locations along the south side of Weston Road and Jane Street.

The Five Point Generalz first gained nationwide attention after members of the gang were involved in the 2005 Boxing Day shooting, which caused the death of 15-year-old bystander Jane Creba and wounding of six others. The story influenced the then-underway 2006 federal election campaign on the issues of gun crime and street violence. 2005 was dubbed the "Year of the Gun" due to the spike in shootings in the city, including many allegedly perpetrated by members of the Five Point Generalz. The event was used to support a call for the banning of handguns in Canada.

The gang was once again thrust into the spotlight in 2007, after 11-year-old Ephraim Brown was killed by a stray bullet to the neck during a gang shootout, allegedly involving the Five Point Generalz and rival gang the Baghdad Crew, at Jane Street and Sheppard Avenue. In December 2010, alleged Five Point Generalz member Akiel Eubank and alleged Baghdad Crew member Gregory Sappleton were acquitted in the murder trial of Ephraim Brown. Despite being pegged as "gang enemies" by the prosecution, both Eubank and Sappleton hugged upon leaving the courtroom and stated that they have always been friends, not rival gang members as alleged. Eubank conceded that he was a member of the Five Point Generalz, but Sappleton denied the prosecution's claim that he was a member of the Baghdad Crew. The event, along with the shooting death of 15-year-old Jordan Manners at C. W. Jefferys high school in the same area, raised calls for a ban on handguns once again.

On June 22, 2018 Toronto Police conducted a series of raids across the Greater Toronto Area targeting the Five Point Generalz and mainly the younger subset G2M. They seized 78 handguns which is the largest amount ever seized in Toronto. Police arrested 75 people and laid over 1000 charges. Drugs including cocaine, fentanyl, carfentanil, heroin and marijuana were seized and $184,000 in cash was confiscated as well.
