= Municipal poets laureate in British Columbia =

This is a list of municipal poets laureate in British Columbia, Canada.

== Comox Valley ==
Poets laureate of Comox Valley include Kevin Flesher (2015-2017), Natalie Nickerson (2017-2019), and Lawrence J.W. Cooper (2019-2021).

== Nanaimo ==
Poets laureate of Nanaimo include Kamal Parmar (2021-2023), Tina Biello (2017 – 2020), and Naomi Beth Wakan (2013 – 2016).

== New Westminster ==
Poets laureate of New Westminster include Edna Anderson (1998–1999), Don Benson (1999–2007), Candice James (2010–2016), Alan Hill (2017–2020) and Elliott Slinn (2021–2024).

== Surrey ==
The inaugural poet laureate of Surrey was Renée Sarojini Saklikar (2015–2018)

== Tofino ==
Poets laureate of Tofino include Joanna Streetly (2018 – 2020), Christine Lowther (2020-2022), Heather Hendry (2022–2024) and Janice Lore (2024–2026).

== Vancouver ==
Poets laureate of Vancouver's poets laureate are George McWhirter (2007–2009), Brad Cran (2009–2011), Evelyn Lau (2011–2014), Rachel Rose (2014–2017), Miss Christie Lee (Christie Charles) (2018–2021), Fiona Tinwei Lam (2022–2025), and Elee Kraljii Gardner (2025–present).

== Victoria ==
Poets laureate of Victoria include Carla Funk (2006–2008), Linda Rogers (2009–2011), Janet Marie Rogers (2012–2014), Yvonne Blomer (2015–2018), John Barton (2019–2022), Marie Metaphor Specht (2023–2025), and Kyeren Regehr (2025-present).

== See also ==
- Poet Laureate of Toronto
- Canadian Parliamentary Poet Laureate
- Municipal poets laureate in Alberta
- Municipal poets laureate in Ontario
