= Mount Dennis =

- Neighbourhood
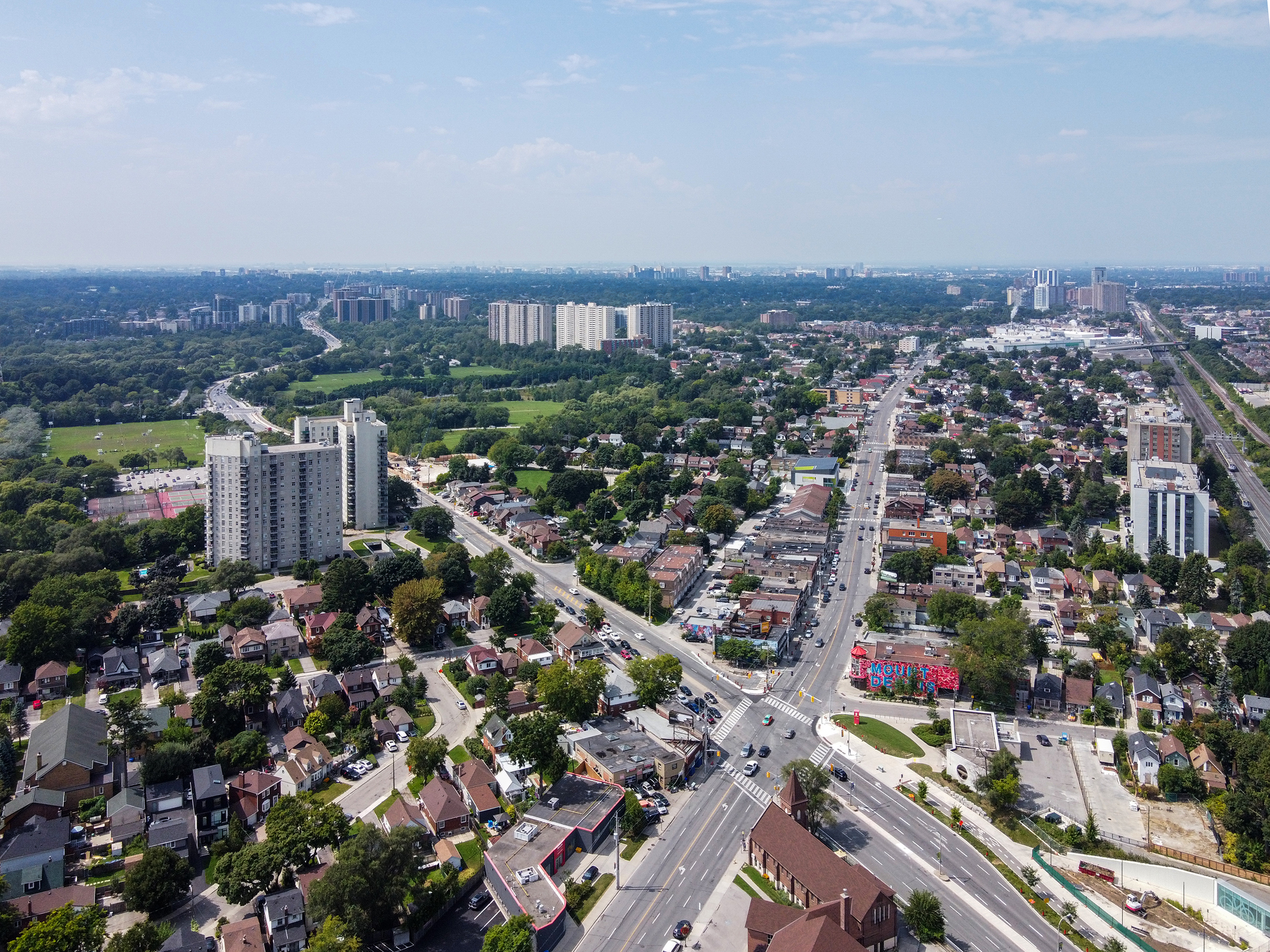
- Aerial view of Mount Dennis in 2024

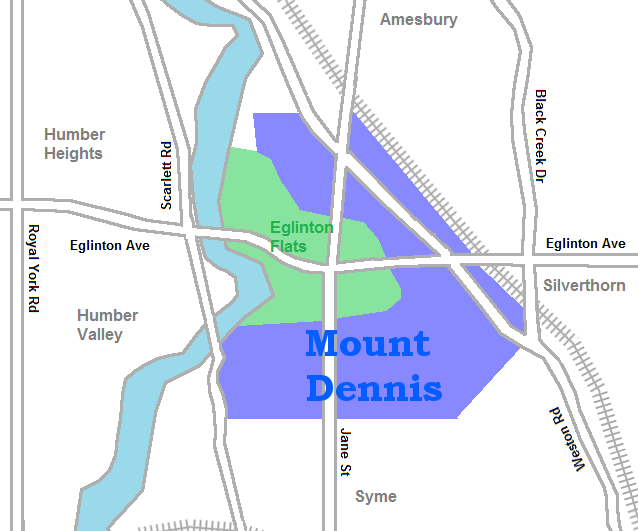

- Location within Toronto
- Coordinates: 43°41′31.14″N 79°30′22.37″W
- Country: Canada
- Province: Ontario
- City: Toronto
- Established: 1850 (York Township)
- Urbanized: 1950s

Government
  - MP: Ahmed Hussen (York South—Weston)
  - MPP: Mohamed Firin (York South—Weston)
  - Councillor: Frances Nunziata (Ward 11 York South-Weston)

Population (2016)
  - Total: 62,620

Mount Dennis is a neighbourhood in Toronto, Ontario, Canada. It was initially an urban area within the former township of York. Primarily located along Eglinton Avenue between the Humber River and the Kitchener commuter rail line, the neighbourhood was best known for Kodak Heights, once a major film manufacturing facility owned and operated by the Eastman Kodak Company. According to the 2016 Toronto Ward 11 census, 62,620 residents are in the area, with a median age of 39.3 as of 2016, and a population growth of over 0.4% as of 2016. 24, 895 households are in Ward 11, and 230 net new households were built in 2016. A total of 31,125 of 62,620 are immigrant populations as of 2016. Unemployment rate is 9.5% in Ward 11 as of 2016, with an average household income of $66,447 and is much lower than Toronto's average of $102,721 as of 2016. Average rent price is $940/month as of the 2016 census.

== History ==
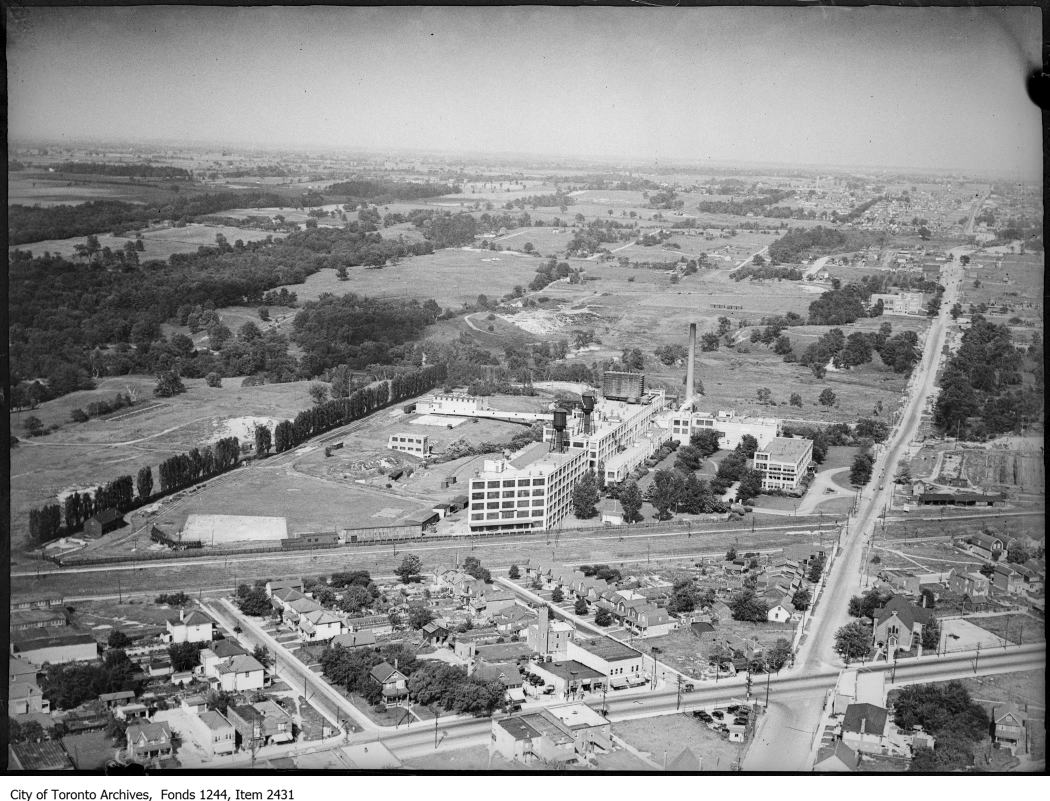
Aerial view of the Kodak campus in Mount Dennis in 1917, which is now a TTC Black Creek Servicing Yard and LRT station in 2022 called Mount Dennis Station. The homes at the bottom left are now the site of a No Frills Supermarket, which were expropriated due to the CN rail line expansion through the area.

The area takes its name from the Dennis family, Loyalist shipbuilders who owned the property, as well as a boatyard on the Humber, at the turn of the 19th century. It remained largely rural, with orchards, gravel and clay pits and a few market gardens. Kodak Canada moved its factory to a site at Eglinton Avenue and Weston Road, along the rail line running next to Weston Road, in 1913. This factory complex, known as "Kodak Heights", was a major employer for Mount Dennis' residents until it was shut down in 2005.

The area became what urban geographer Richard Harris described as an "unplanned suburb" in his book Unplanned Suburbs: Toronto's American Tragedy 1900 to 1950. Workers at Kodak and the nearby stockyards once located at Weston Road and St. Clair Avenue, as well as CCM, Willys Overland and other factories north and south of Mount Dennis built their own homes before municipal services were in place, and small developers built "infill" homes, gradually filling the streets with the current housing stock of former cottages and small, fully detached homes, among the most affordable housing stock in Toronto for recent immigrants and first-time homeowners.

== Culture ==
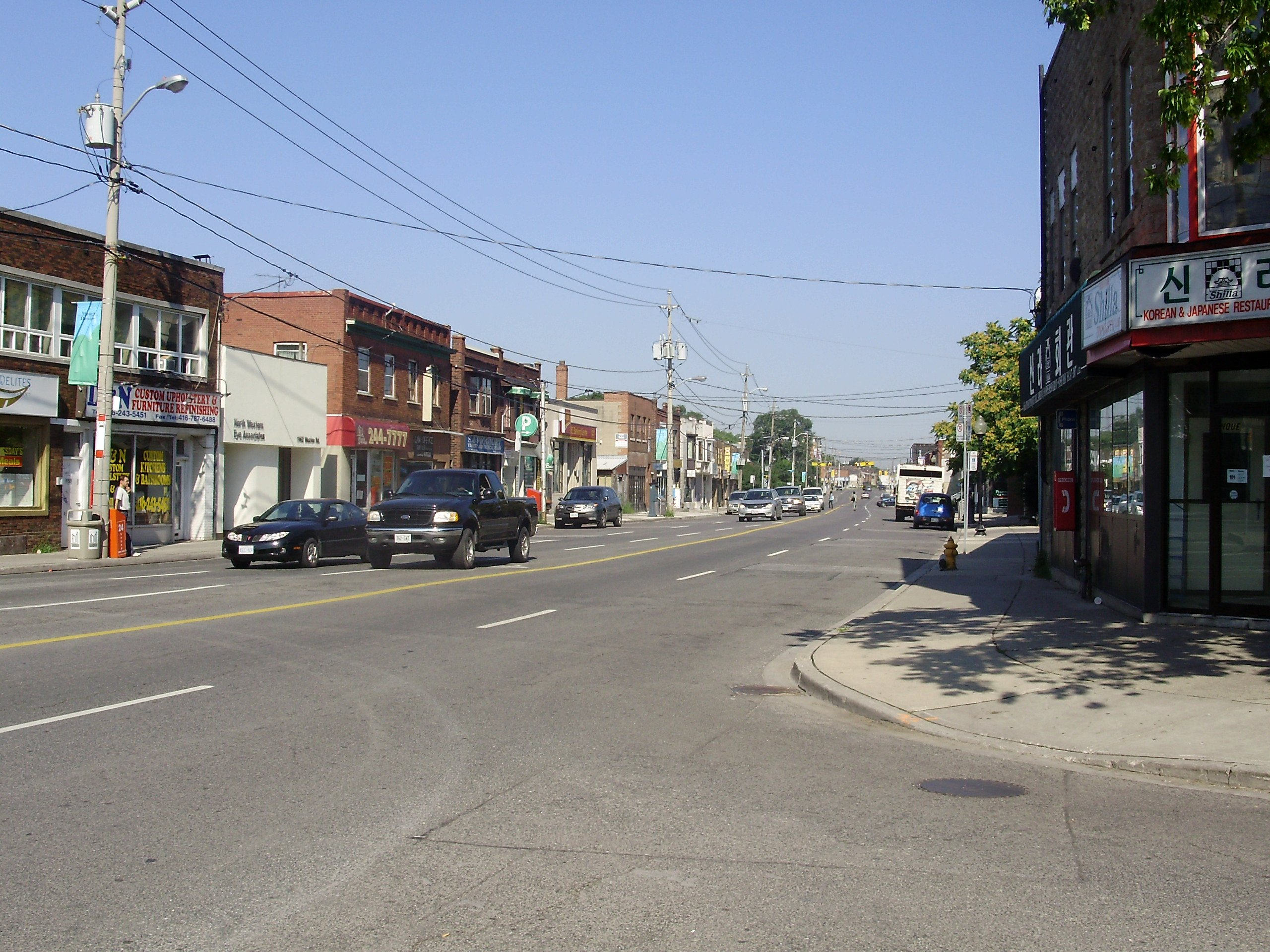
Storefronts along Weston Road in Mount Dennis at Weston Road and Eglinton Avenue West, looking north

In 2014 a public art installation titled Nyctophilia opened at Weston Road and Dennis Avenue. Designed by Toronto artists Daniel Young and Christian Giroux, the piece is part of a series of revitalization projects targeted at supporting the neighbourhood and its residents as it evolves beyond its industrial past.

Weston–Mount Dennis was once a centre of manufacturing, and later a centre of small immigrant shops. Eventually one type of business, hair salons and barbershops serving the Black community, came to predominate. In 2012, a community organizer proposed proclaiming it an official hair district.

== Demographic ==
The area is a classic example of Toronto's diversity, with dozens of ethnic groups represented, however the largest ethnic group by far are from the Caribbean and West Africa with the vast majority of visible minorities of Jamaican descent. With respect to religion, there are many black store front churches representing the many faiths of the African and Caribbean communities as well as Western-European, Middle Eastern and Asian faiths such as Christian, Roman Catholicism, Pentecostalism, Seventh Day Adventist), Muslim, and Buddhist as seen along the Weston Road Corridor. Among the languages spoken are Spanish, Somali, Vietnamese, Patois and Portuguese from the 2016 Ward 11 census.

In Mount Dennis’s census tract 5350156.01, the median income for residents in the community in 2006 as $17,771. This information was collected by the mandatory long-form census conducted in 2006. In 2011, the average household income was $20,637. It had grown by $2,866. This information was collected by the voluntary National Household Survey in 2011. This demonstrates in general, income levels are rising in Mount Dennis. Data in 2011 was affected by Mount Dennis’ GNR (global non-response rate) of 38.5%. An average household income as of 2016 is $66,447 and is much lower than Toronto's average of $102,721 as of 2016. This further demonstrating this trend of rising household incomes.

In census tract 5350156.01 in 2006, 600 residents owned their homes while 1590 residents rented their homes. This information was gathered by the mandatory long-form census conducted in 2006. By 2011, 625 residents owned their homes while 1646 residents rented. This information was collected by the voluntary National Household Survey in 2011. This shows residents in Mount Dennis are much more likely to rent than own their homes. Data in 2011 was affected by Mount Dennis’ GNR (global non-response rate) of 38.5%.

== Education ==
Dennis Community School is a secular public elementary school at 17 Dennis Avenue, near Weston Road and Eglinton Avenue West, operated by the Toronto District School Board. The first Mount Dennis school opened in 1891 according to the TDSB's web-site for Dennis Avenue Community School (GR. JK-06). For Catholic Primary Education, Our Lady of Victory at 70 Guestville Ave is also available for education, and was founded in 1944, and is operated by the TCDSB. St Nicholas of Bari, Santa Maria, St John Bosco, Pope Paul, St Rita, St Cecilia, St Bernard, St Francis Xavier, St Andre elementary schools are all operated by the TCDSB, and are all elementary schools that border Mount Dennis as well, giving testament to the neighbourhood's strong Catholic base since the post World War II era.

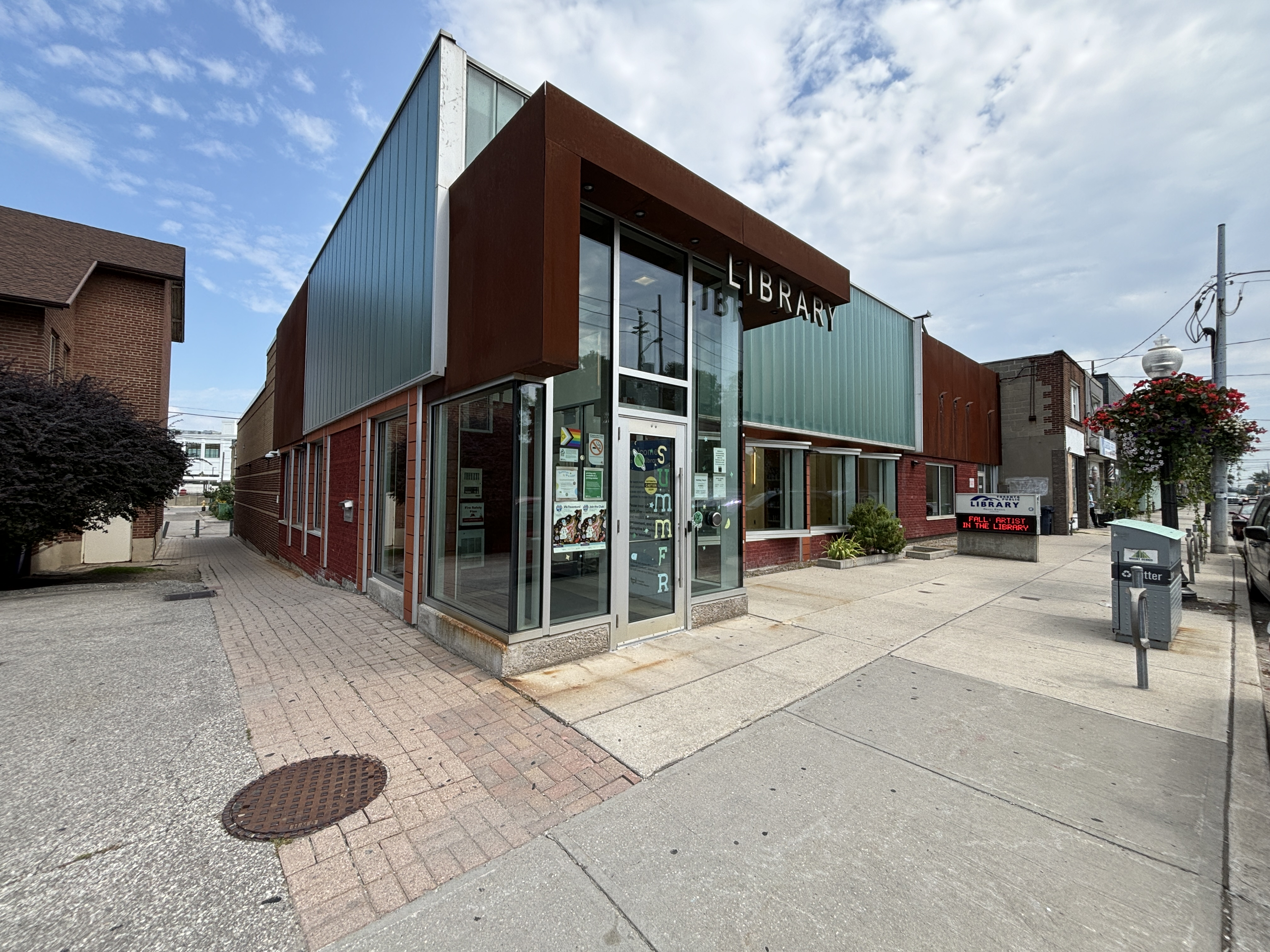
Mount Dennis Library is a branch of the Toronto Public Library located in the neighbourhood.

The neighbourhood's 60-year-old library, a branch of the Toronto Public Library system, reopened in 2013 after extensive renovations. Located at Weston Rd. and Eglinton Avenue West. The new facility was designed to be a community hub and is seen by some to reflect the evolving nature of the neighbourhood.

== Public transit ==
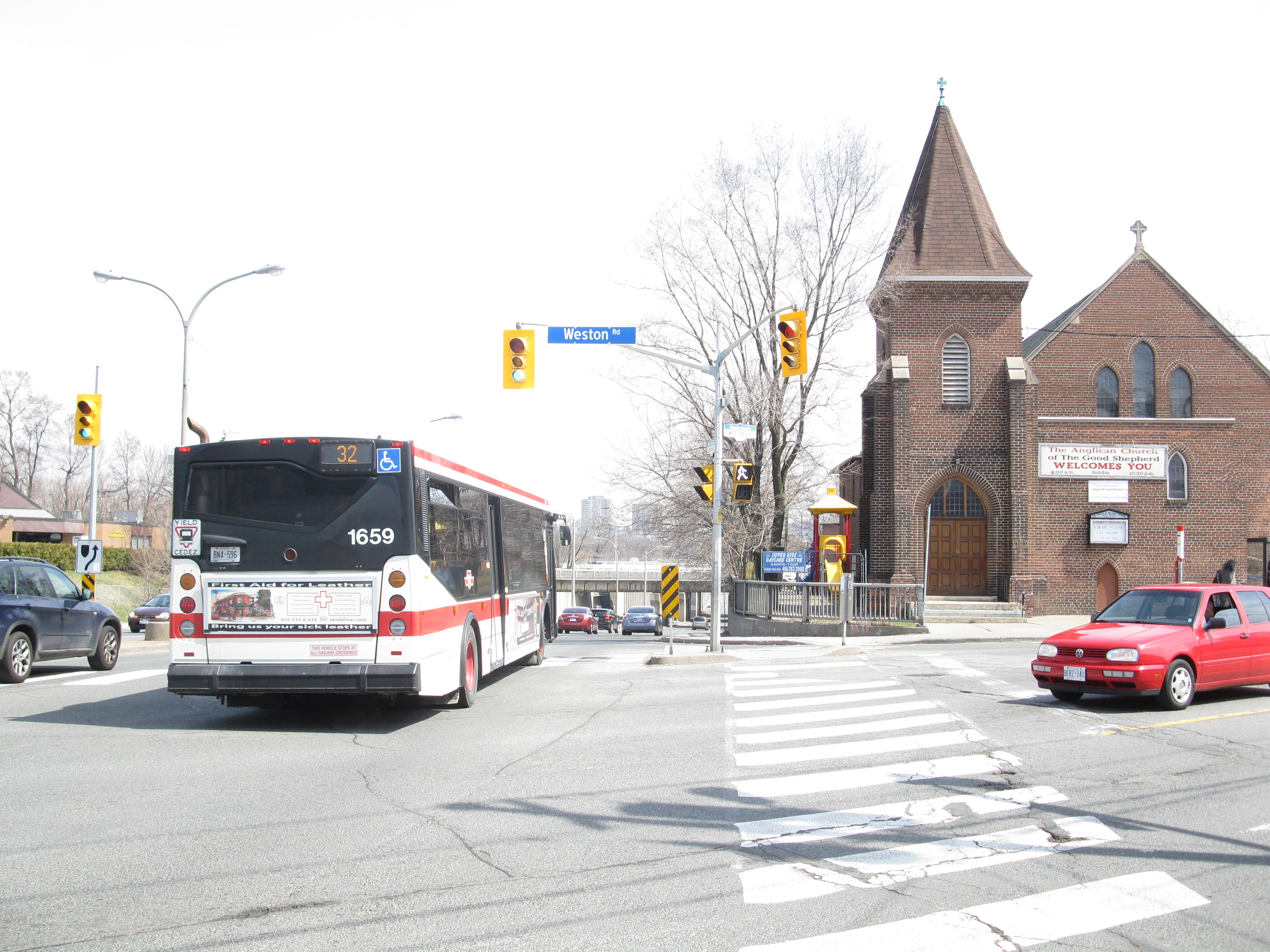
The TTC operates several bus lines in the neighbourhood. The Church of St. Mary and St. Martha is visible on the right. Facing east on Eglinton Avenue West at Weston Road.

Mount Dennis station is a grade-separated light rail station that serves the neighbourhood. It is the westernmost terminus of Line 5 Eglinton, and is an intermodal station with connections with the GO Transit Kitchener line and the Union Pearson Express, an airport rail link connection Union station to Toronto Pearson International Airport. It opened on November 16, 2025, for GO Transit, Toronto Transit Commission bus, and UP Express services, and February 8, 2026, for Line 5 service.

In late 2015 Metrolinx made public its plans to include a gas-fired electrical generator on its Mount Dennis campus.

== Crime ==
According to Division 12 TPS crime statistics, 18 shootings and 4 murders took place in 2020 year-to-date, and hundreds of assault and dozens of break-and-enter charges as well, underlying the area's youth crime problem. The neighbourhood's violent crime rate has not abated in recent years.

The area is frequented by gangs like the Eglinton West Crips, Five Point Generalz, Dixon Bloods, Jamaican posse, Shower Posse, Organized crime in Nigeria like the Black Axe Crime Ring, Trethewey Gangstas, Scarlett Blocc and Baghdad Crew.
