= Municipal poets laureate in Alberta =

This is a list of municipal poets laureate in Alberta, Canada.

== Calgary ==
Poets laureate of Calgary include Kris Demeanor (2012–2014), Derek Beaulieu (2014–2016), Micheline Maylor (2016–2018), Sheri-D Wilson (2018–2020), Natalie Meisner (2020–2022) and Wakefield Brewster (2022–2024).

== Banff ==
Poets laureate of Banff include Amelie Patterson (2017-2018), Steven Ross Smith (2019-2020), Derek Beaulieu (2022-2024), and Heather Jean Jordan (2025-2026).

== Edmonton ==
Poets laureate of Edmonton include Alice Major (2005–2007), E.D. Blodgett (2007–2009), Roland Pemberton (2006–2011), Anna Marie Sewell (2011–2012), Mary Pinkoski (2013–2015), Pierrette Requier (2015–2017), Ahmed “Knowmadic” Ali (2017–2019), Nisha Patel (2019–2021), Titilope Sonuga (2021–2023), Shima Robinson (2023–2025), and Medgine Mathurin (2025–).

== See also ==
- Poet Laureate of Toronto
- Canadian Parliamentary Poet Laureate
- Municipal poets laureate in British Columbia
- Municipal poets laureate in Ontario
- Poet laureate
