= Pierrette Requier =

Canadian poet and playwright

Pierrette Requier is a Canadian poet and playwright based in Edmonton, Alberta, who writes in both English and French. She served as the sixth Poet Laureate of Edmonton from 2015 to 2017.

== Early life ==
Requier was the fourth of 11 siblings in a Franco-Albertan family in Donnelly in Alberta's Peace River Country. Her grandparents had journeyed from Jersey to Montreal before arriving in Alberta in 1914. Her family was thoroughly bilingual, and she grew up learning both French and English. At 18, she left for Edmonton to study English literature at University of Alberta, then spent five years teaching in northern Alberta and Australia. She returned to Edmonton and settled in the neighborhood of Ritchie, raising a family while teaching English and French at elementary schools. In the 1990s, she returned to University of Alberta to do a master's degree in theology at St. Stephen's College.

== Career ==
Requier began to write poems and involve herself in the poetry community in her thirties. As a collaboration between the Regroupement artistique francophone de l'Alberta and the Edmonton Poetry Festival Society, she founded the French Twist showcase of Francophone poetry in Edmonton. In 2009, Requier published a collection of very short stories inspired by her childhood, Details from the edge of the village, which in 2022 was released in French as Petites nouvelles du Last Best Ouest. In 2023, Requier discussed the collection in an episode of Claudia Larochelle's Radio-Canada television show Claudia à la page as part of a series focusing on Canadian francophone writers outside Quebec.

In 2015, Requier succeeded Mary Pinkoski as the sixth Poet Laureate of Edmonton. The same year, her stage work Les Blues des oubliées (The Blues of the Forgotten) premiered at Edmonton's Unithéâtre. The play is primarily in French strewn with fragments of English, and features a woman, La Chercheuse, caught between identities as she remembers her pioneer grandmother, based on Requier's own grandmother.

In 2017, Requier's 11-part poem "This City Edmonton — Notre ville — pêhonân" became the inspiration for a 30-panel mural in Edmonton City Centre by AJA Louden and Clay Lowe, with contributions from Lana Whiskeyjack and others. The poem was inspired by Requier's frequent walks through the city throughout the seasons and Douglas Haynes's paintings in Edmonton City Hall, among other things.
