= Galloway Boys =

Gang based in Southern Ontario

- Founding location: Scarborough, Ontario, Canada
- Years active: Early 2000s–present
- Territory: Scarborough
- Ethnicity: Black Canadians
- Membership (est.): 50–100
- Criminal activities: Drug trafficking, robbery, extortion, murder, burglary, racketeering

The Galloway Boys, also known as the Galloway Gang or G-Way, are a gang based in Southern Ontario, Canada, originating in the east end Toronto district of Scarborough a small borough in Toronto. They were founded in Scarborough in the early 1980s. Expanding east towards Durham Region, and Kawartha Lakes. Originally formed as a group of friends who banded together to sell drugs in an attempt to overcome extreme poverty. In order to control the gangs drug distribution territory, The Galloway Boys are now responsible for multiple gang-related violence incidents in the Scarborough and Oshawa areas, such as the Danzig Street shooting. The Galloway Boys recruit young impoverished men by offering glory and riches, but most have ended up dead or in prison.
