= A. F. Moritz =

Canadian poet (born 1947)

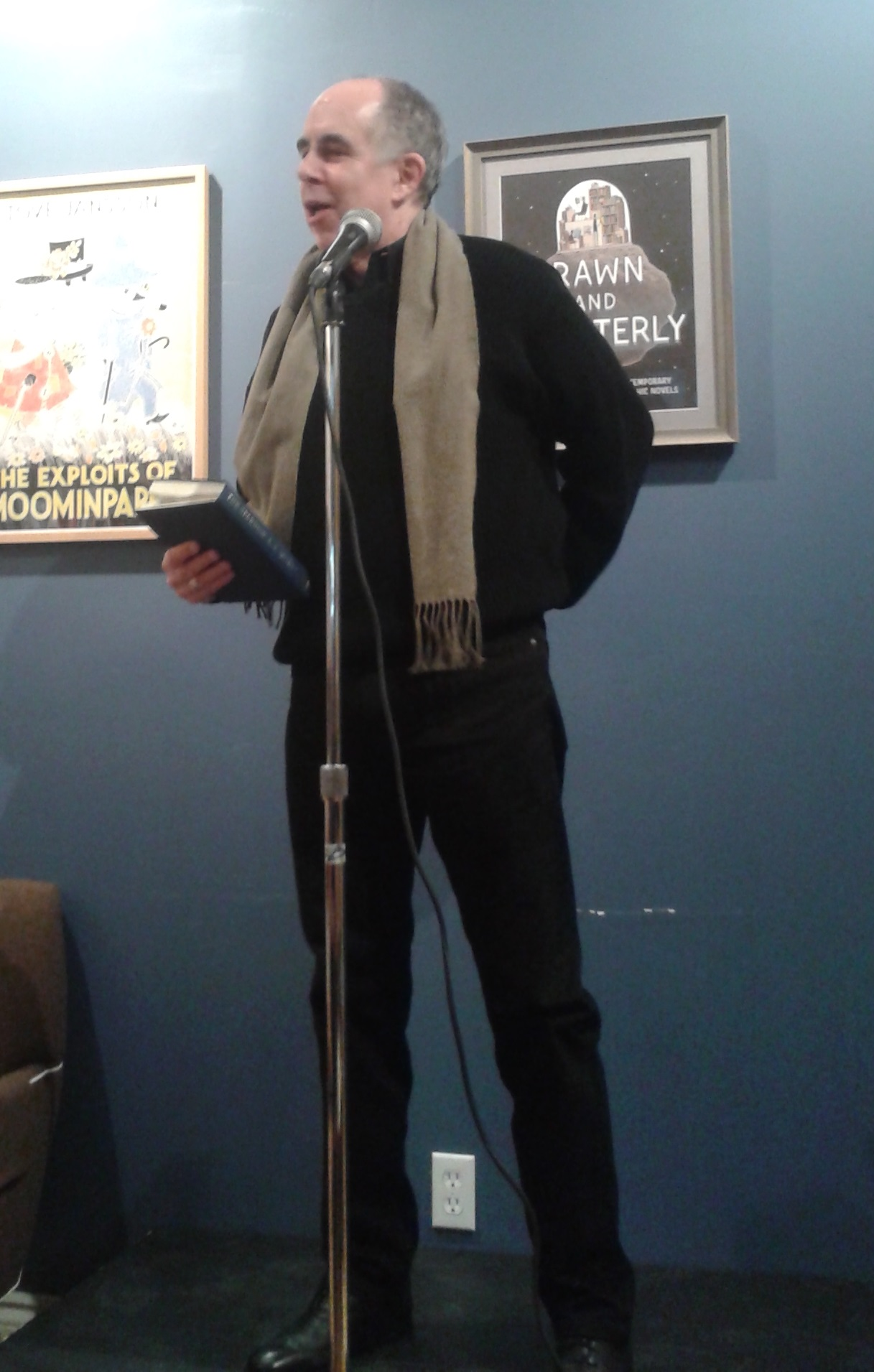
- Moritz at Drawn & Quarterly in 2018
- Born: Albert Frank Moritz; 15 April 1947 (age 79); Niles, Ohio, US
- Education: Ph.D., Marquette University
- Occupation: Poet
- Spouse: Theresa Moritz
- Writing career
- Language: English
- Notable awards: Guggenheim Fellowship, ReLit Award, Griffin Poetry Prize
- Website: afmoritz.com

Albert Frank Moritz (born 15 April 1947) is an American-born Canadian poet, teacher and scholar.

== Biography ==
Born on 15 April 1947, in Niles, Ohio, Moritz was educated at Marquette University, receiving a Ph.D. for his dissertation on Tennyson.

Since 1975, he has made his home in Toronto, Ontario where he has worked variously as an advertising copywriter and executive, editor, publisher, and university professor. His poetry has been honored with a 1990 Guggenheim Fellowship, inclusion in the Princeton Series of Contemporary Poets, and numerous other awards. He currently teaches at Victoria College in the University of Toronto.

He was the winner of the ReLit Award for poetry in 2005 for Night Street Repairs, the Griffin Poetry Prize in 2009 for The Sentinel, and the Raymond Souster Award in 2013 for The New Measures. He is a three-time nominee for the Governor General's Award for English-language poetry, receiving nominations at the 2000 Governor General's Awards for Rest on the Flight into Egypt, at the 2008 Governor General's Awards for The Sentinel, and at the 2012 Governor General's Awards for The New Measures.

In 2019, Moritz was named as the new Poet Laureate of Toronto.

In May 2019, the Redpath Sugar company decided to withdraw their invitation for Moritz to recite a new poem he had composed at a celebration of the 60th anniversary of their opening of the Redpath Sugar Refinery, on Toronto's waterfront. Passages in his poem reflected on the sugar industry's dark legacy of the use of slave labour. Moritz said he was not offended by Redpath rescinding his invitation, comparing the anniversary celebration to a wedding, where those organizing the event had an unquestionable right to control the event.

He is married to Theresa Moritz, with whom he has collaborated on a number of books.

== Bibliography ==
=== Poetry ===
- Here – 1975
- Signs and Certainties – 1979
- Black Orchid – 1981
- Between the Root and the Flower – 1982
- The Visitation – 1983
- The Tradition – 1986
- Song of Fear – 1992
- The Ruined Cottage – 1993
- Ciudad interior – 1993
- Phantoms in the Ark – 1994 (with Ludwig Zeller)
- Mahoning – 1994
- Early Poems
- Conflicting Desire
- The End of the Age
- A Houseboat on the Styx – 1998
- Rest on the Flight into Egypt – 1999
- Night Street Repairs (House of Anansi Press, 2004)
- The Sentinel (House of Anansi Press, 2008) – winner of the 2009 Canadian Griffin Poetry Prize)
- The New Measures - (House of Anansi Press, 2012)
- Sequence - (House of Anansi Press, 2015)
- The Sparrow (House of Anansi Press, 2018)
- As Far As You Know (House of Anansi Press, 2020)

=== Non-fiction ===
- Canada Illustrated
- America the Picturesque
- The Pocket Canada: A Guidebook – 1982
- Leacock: A Biography – 1985 (with Theresa Moritz)
- The Oxford Literary Guide to Canada – 1987 (with Theresa Moritz)
- The World's Most Dangerous Woman: A New Biography of Emma Goldman (with Theresa Moritz)
- Stephen Leacock: His Remarkable Life (with Theresa Moritz)

=== Translations ===
- Children of the Quadrilateral: Selected Poems of Benjamin Péret
- Testament of Man: Selected Poems of Gilberto Meza
- Ludwig Zeller in the Country of the Antipodes: Poems 1964–1979
- The Marble Head and Other Poems, by Ludwig Zeller
- The Ghost's Tattoos, by Ludwig Zeller
- Body of Insomnia and Other Poems, by Ludwig Zeller
- Rio Loa: Station of Dreams, by Ludwig Zeller
