= Kodak House =

Art Deco building in Dublin, Ireland

The Kodak Building
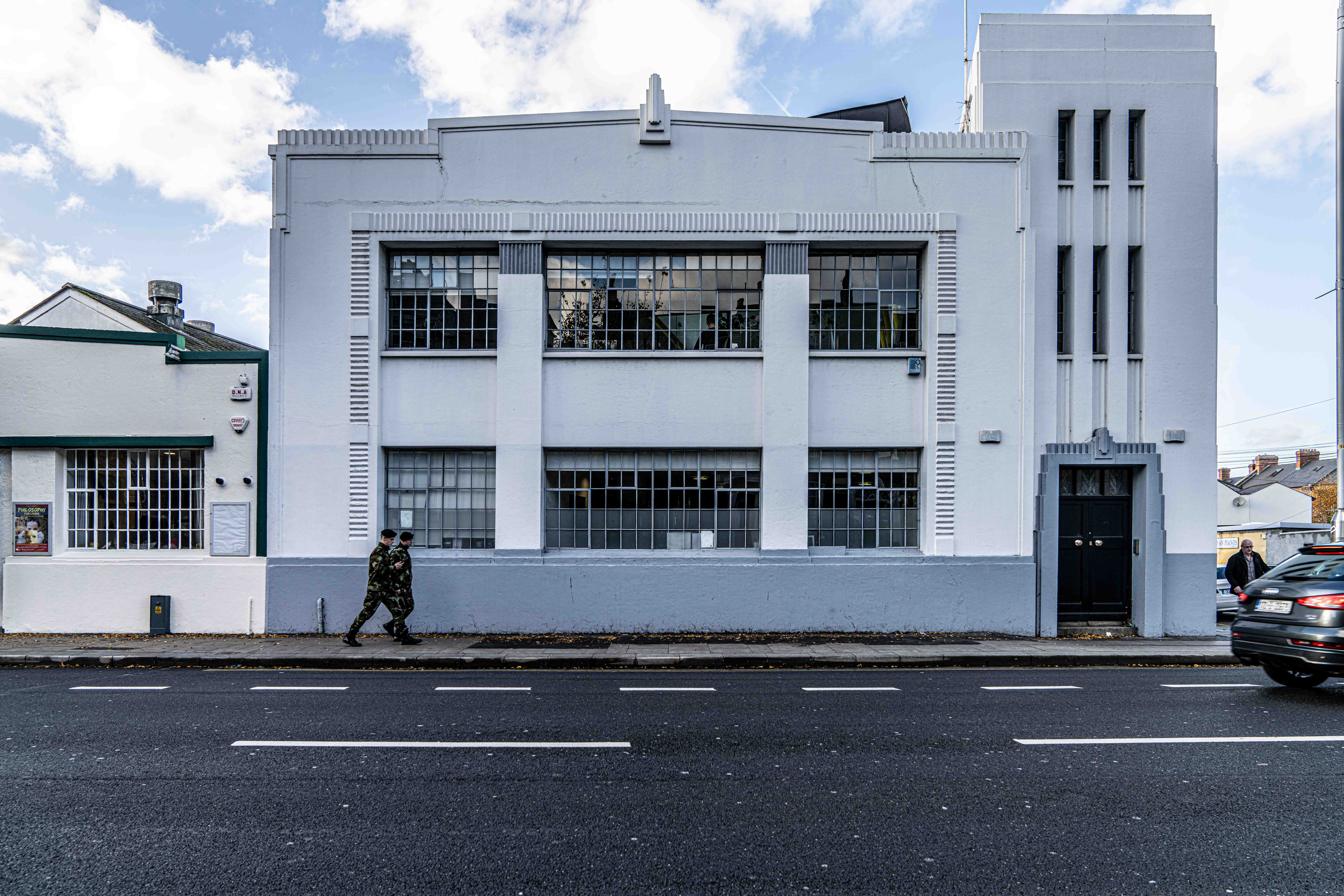
- The Kodak Building in 2019

- Location within Dublin

General information
- Type: Commercial and office
- Architectural style: Art Deco
- Location: Rathmines, 41A Blackberry Lane, Dublin, Ireland D06 AK24
- Coordinates: 53.3285°N 6.2649°W
- Current tenants: Advertising agency, other
- Construction started: 1930
- Completed: 1932
- Client: Kodak

Design and construction
- Architects: Donnelly, Moore and Keatinge

References
- www.theKodakbuilding.com

The Kodak Building is an Art Deco building in the inner suburb of Rathmines in Dublin, Ireland. It was designed by architects Donnelly, Moore and Keatinge in 1930 and was built in 1932. It was originally the warehouse for Kodak Ireland and now houses an advertising agency and other businesses.

== Design ==
According to the Twentieth Century Society, Kodak's founder George Eastman ran "an image-conscious company" and wanted the Dublin building to disguise the "raw factory" within. Kodak hired Irish firm Donnelly Moore and Keatinge. They designed a structure with horizontal steel windows that were embedded in concrete walls. They accompanied this with "a squat but imposing tower with vertical slit windows as its central feature". William Sedgewick Keatinge made alterations to the design starting in 1949 and later still, Paul Keogh Architects undertook a complete refurbishment of the building.

In naming the structure as "building of the month" for August 2019, the Twentieth Century Society stated that "the building itself, despite having its once-cream render painted white, still stands out against Dublin’s traditional red brick streets". Noting further that a commentator had said the structure looked like “a stray project from Miami Beach that found itself cast adrift in Dublin”.

=== Gallery ===
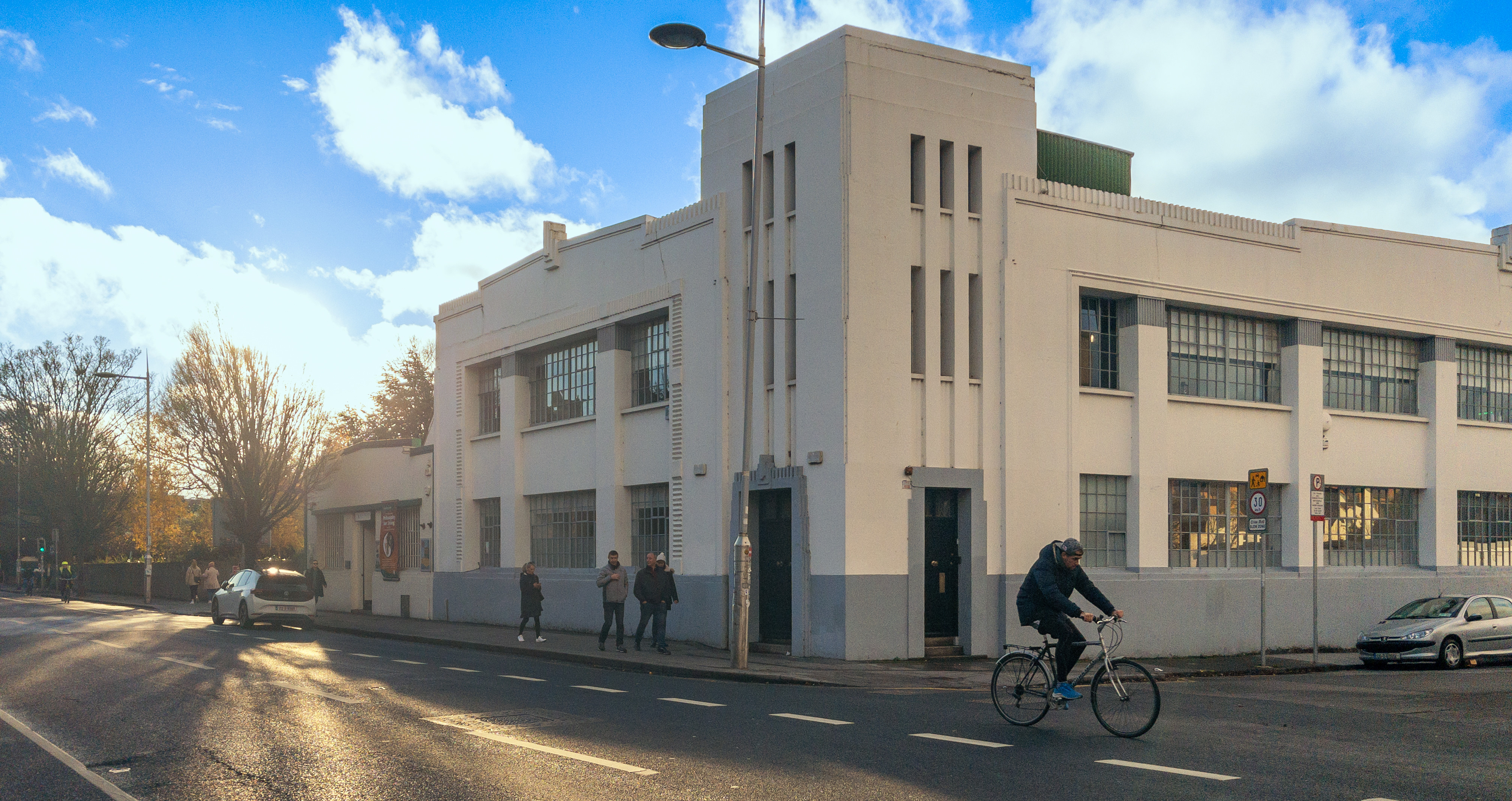
The short tower of Kodak House

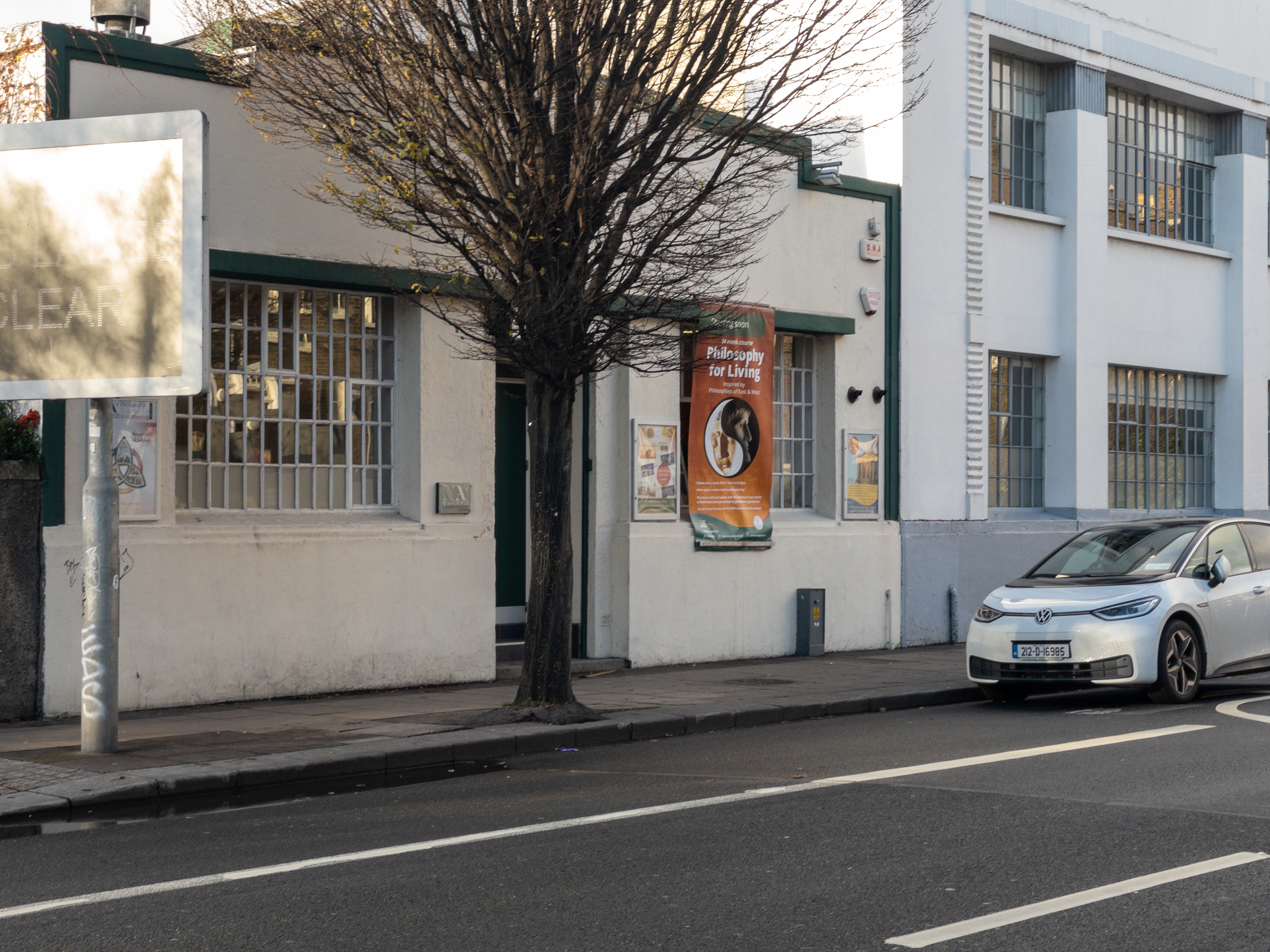
Kodak House sits at the northern end of Rathmines

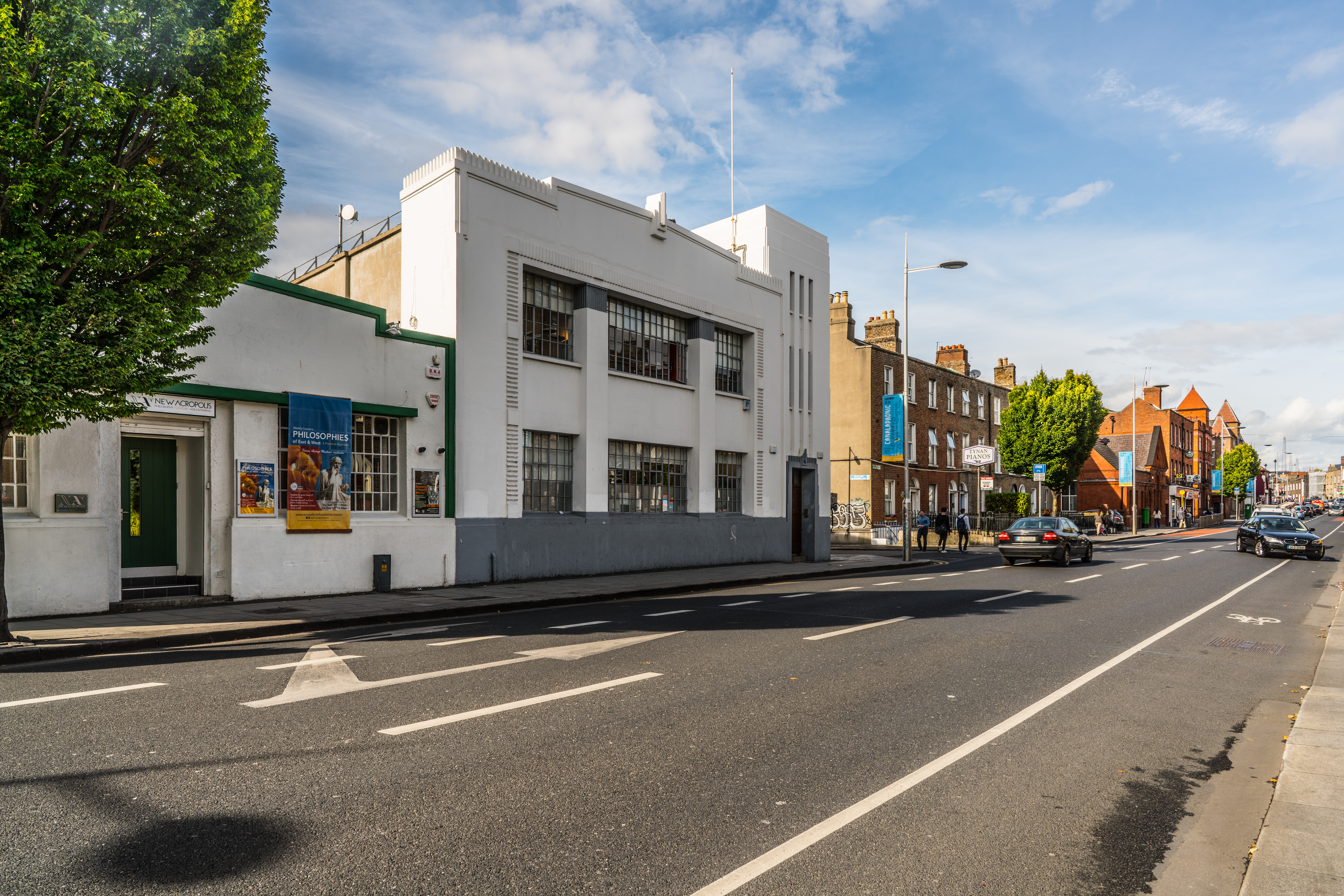
The buildings surrounding the art deco Kodak House are largely Georgian and Victorian
