= Boxing Day shooting =

2005 gang violence in Toronto, Canada

The Boxing Day shooting was a Canadian gang-related shooting which occurred on December 26, 2005, on Toronto's Yonge Street, resulting in the death of 15-year-old student Jane Creba. Six other bystanders—four men and two women—were wounded. The incident took place on one of Toronto's most crowded streets on the very busy shopping day, just a few blocks north of the Toronto Eaton Centre. The story generated national news coverage in Canada and influenced the then-underway 2006 federal election campaign on the issues of gun crime and street violence.

== Fatality ==
Jane Creba (May 13, 1990 – December 26, 2005), a grade 10 student at Riverdale Collegiate Institute, was killed in the incident. While shopping with her sister, she was exiting a Pizza Pizza on the west side of the street, when the gunfight erupted. One bullet passed through her upper torso, lodging in her clothing; it was later recovered in hospital. She was rushed to St. Michael's Hospital and died during emergency surgery.

== Initial arrests ==
Police arrested two men on several gun charges at Castle Frank subway station within an hour after the shooting: Andre Thompson, 20, who was on probation at the time, and Jorrell Simpson-Rowe, 17. Thompson had been released just before Christmas from Maplehurst Prison near Milton, Ontario, where he had served 30 days for his role in a convenience-store robbery. He declined a bail hearing for his current charges. Police believe as many as 10 to 15 people were involved in the shooting and that more than one gun was fired.

== Later arrests and convictions ==
Twenty Toronto Police detectives were assigned to "Project Green Apple" (named after Creba's favourite food) to work on the case. On June 13, 2006, Toronto Police conducted multiple raids at 14 locations throughout Toronto in the early morning, arresting six men and two teenagers. Charges laid against them included manslaughter, second-degree murder, and attempted murder relating to the six other bystanders. All arrested are members of two different street gangs.

In October 2007, a young man who was rounded up in the initial arrests, Eric Boateng, was shot dead in a seemingly unconnected incident. Boateng was not charged with the shooting, but was later charged with cocaine trafficking.

As of December 2007, ten people had been charged with murder or manslaughter in the case, three of whom were youths. Those charged with second-degree murder included Jorrell Simpson-Rowe, 17, Tyshaun Barnett and Louis Woodcock, both 19, and Jeremiah Valentine, 24. One of the teenagers who was arrested in June and charged with manslaughter was exonerated on October 25, 2007, after the preliminary hearing. The teenager charged with murder was committed to trial.

On December 7, 2008, Jorrell Simpson-Rowe was convicted by a jury of murder in the second degree. In April 2009, he was sentenced as an adult to life in prison with no chance of parole for seven years.

In November 2009, manslaughter charges against four individuals involved in the incident were dropped because the prosecutors "felt there were no reasonable prospects for conviction". The four were alleged by prosecutors to have had a "common unlawful purpose" in the incident, but did not fire a weapon.

In December 2009, 27-year-old Jeremiah Valentine pleaded guilty to second-degree murder in Creba's death and was given a life sentence with no chance of parole for 12 years. In April 2010, a jury found Louis Woodcock, 23, and Tyshaun Barnett, 22, guilty of manslaughter in the 15-year-old's death, but not guilty of the more serious offence of second-degree murder. They were also found guilty of four counts each of aggravated assault, relating to other people who were wounded by stray bullets that day.

Valentine was later released on parole. In July 2025, he was charged with first-degree murder for a shooting in Montreal.

== Media coverage and community impact ==
The Boxing Day Shooting was the subject of intense media coverage, particularly after a year in which the city of Toronto recorded 80 homicides and a city record 52 shooting deaths. Only one month earlier on November 18, 2005, Amon Beckles was killed outside the sanctuary of a church while attending the funeral of his friend, Jamal Hemmings, whose shooting death he may have witnessed a week earlier, on Eglinton Avenue between Oakwood and Marlee Avenues in the Eglinton West neighbourhood.

The incident was yet another example that led to 2005 being labelled by both the media and police as the year of the gun. Detective Sergeant Savas Kyriacou of the Toronto Police Service spoke for these people in saying, "Toronto has finally lost its innocence. I think we're going to feel this day for a long time to come."

Creba's death has also caused much controversy over the causes of gun crime and the ways to handle the problem. In 2016, author Anita Arvast published a book outlining the issues with systemic discrimination in the case - specifically the charges, convictions and the representation of the incident as a gang rivalry. Also controversial is the resurgence of the Guardian Angels in Toronto; they arrived in mid-January to visit the city. Toronto street patrols began in July; however, the chapter had run into financial difficulties by September 2006. Some coverage has also analyzed the disproportionate coverage Creba's death received, compared to the similar deaths of numerous men and women of colour.

== See also ==
- Danzig Street shooting
- Eaton Centre shooting
- 2018 Toronto shooting
