= Kodak Building 9 =

Former industrial building in Toronto, Ontario

Coordinates: 43.6880°N 79.4869°W

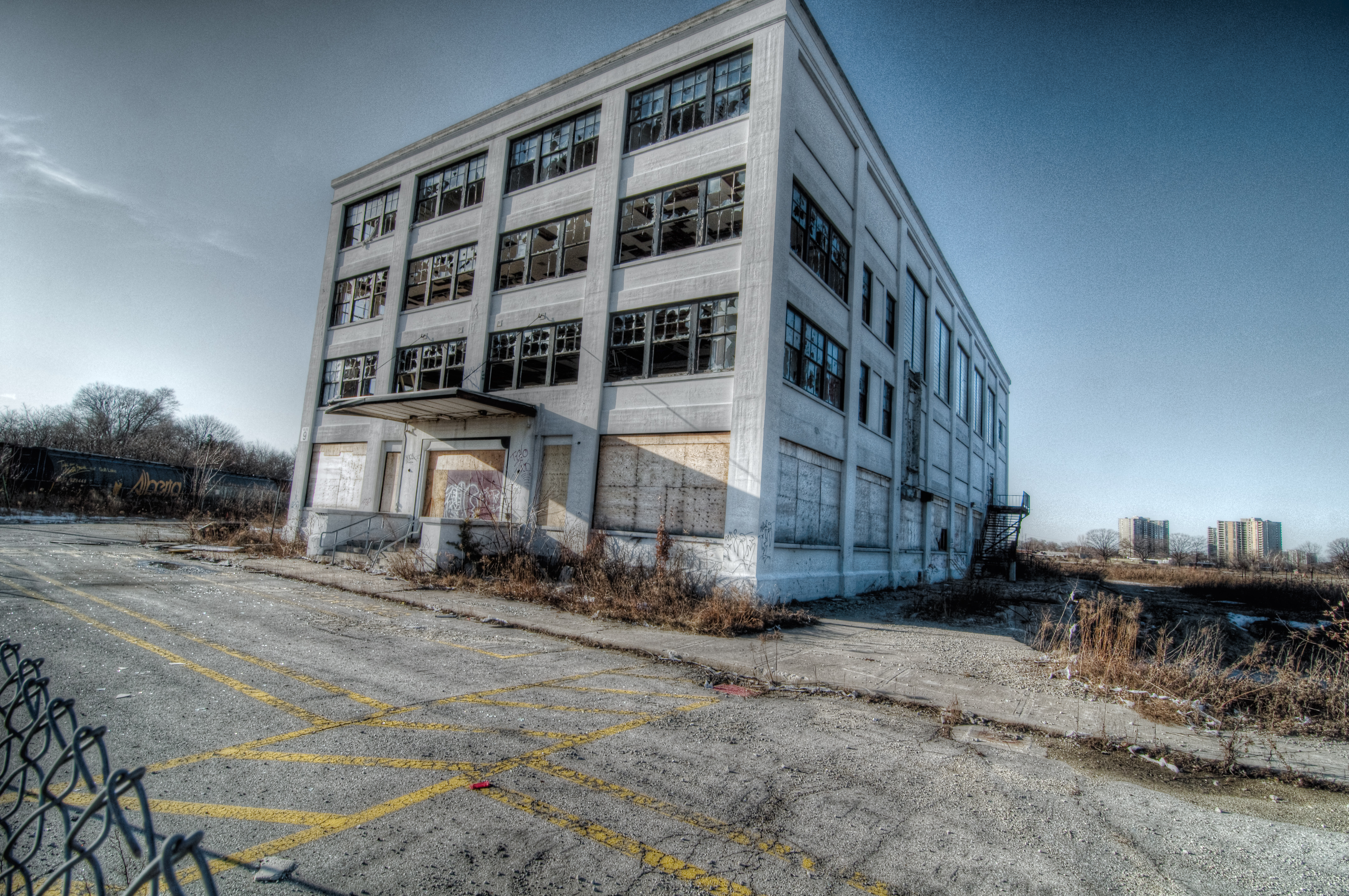
- Kodak Building 9 surrounded by brownfields, circa 2010

General information
- Location: , Toronto, Canada
- Opened: 1940

Kodak Building 9 is a former recreation centre for employees at the Kodak Mount Dennis Campus in Toronto, Ontario, Canada. It now forms a part of Mount Dennis transit station.

== History ==
Built in 1939, Building 9 was operated by the Eastman Kodak Company from 1940 to 2006, when the company ceased operations at the campus. It is the only building standing in the campus, while the other 15 buildings of the campus were demolished.

The building was an entertainment and recreation facility for employees featuring a gym/auditorium, cafeteria, weight room and change rooms. There were darkrooms for photo enthusiasts. The basement had several conference rooms which were used for employee training.

== Abandonment and reuse ==
Following its abandonment, the building was heavily vandalized. There were proposals to elevate the building to a national historic site status in order to preserve it, while local residents requested the building to be used for public recreational purposes. Peter Gatt of the Photographic Museum of Ontario asked for the building to be the museum's new home.

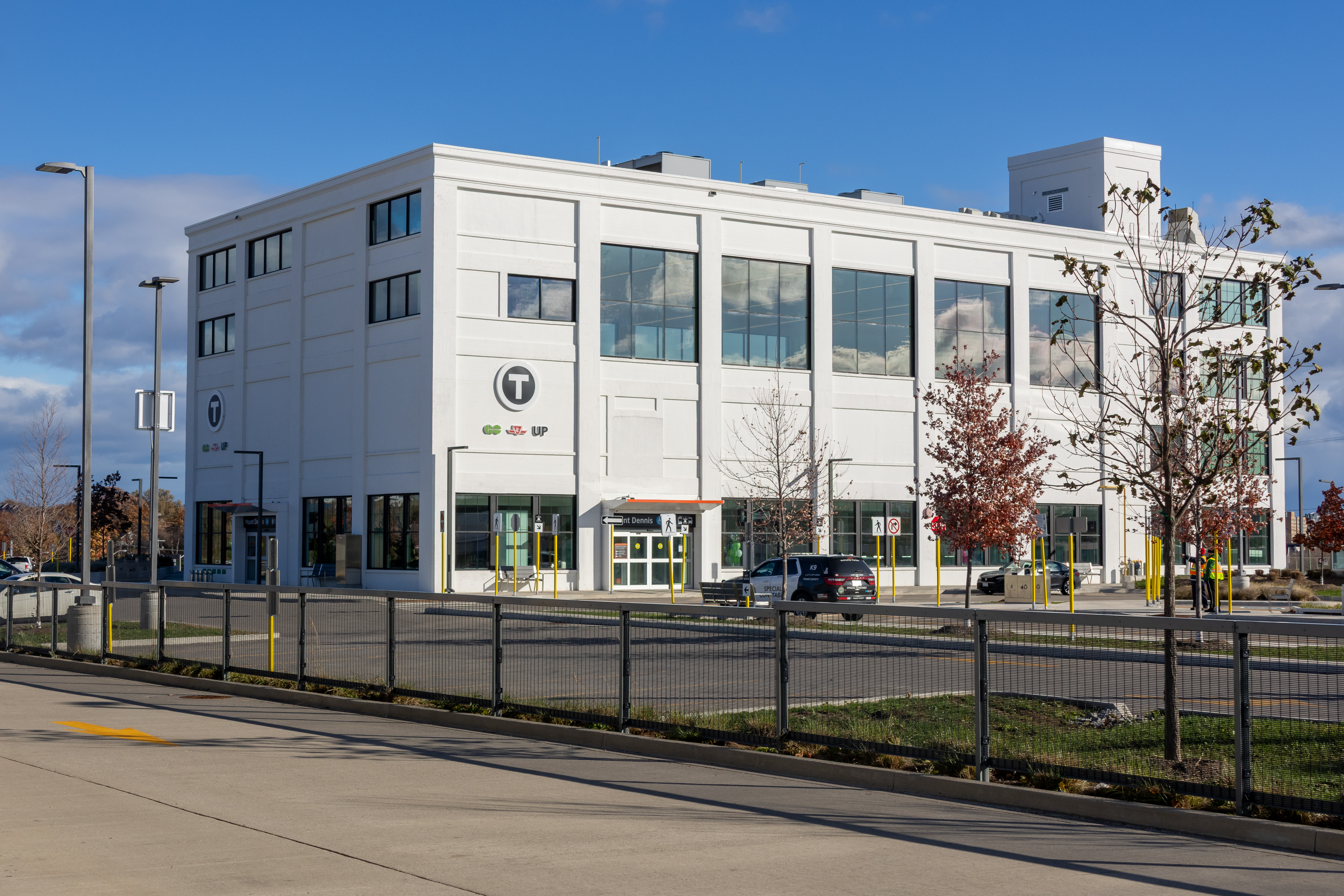
The renovated building as part of Mount Dennis station, 2025

In 2013, the campus was purchased by Metrolinx to become the site of the Mount Dennis metro station and bus terminal. The main floor will be a station entrance while the three floors above will be reserved for future use.

In August 2016, the building was moved to a temporary site for construction of the LRT station. In November 2017, it was moved back to its original position.

The ground floor became publicly accessible when the station opened for GO, UP and TTC bus service on November 16, 2025.
