= Kodak Heights =

Former industrial campus in Toronto, Ontario

Coordinates: 43.68995°N 79.48671°W

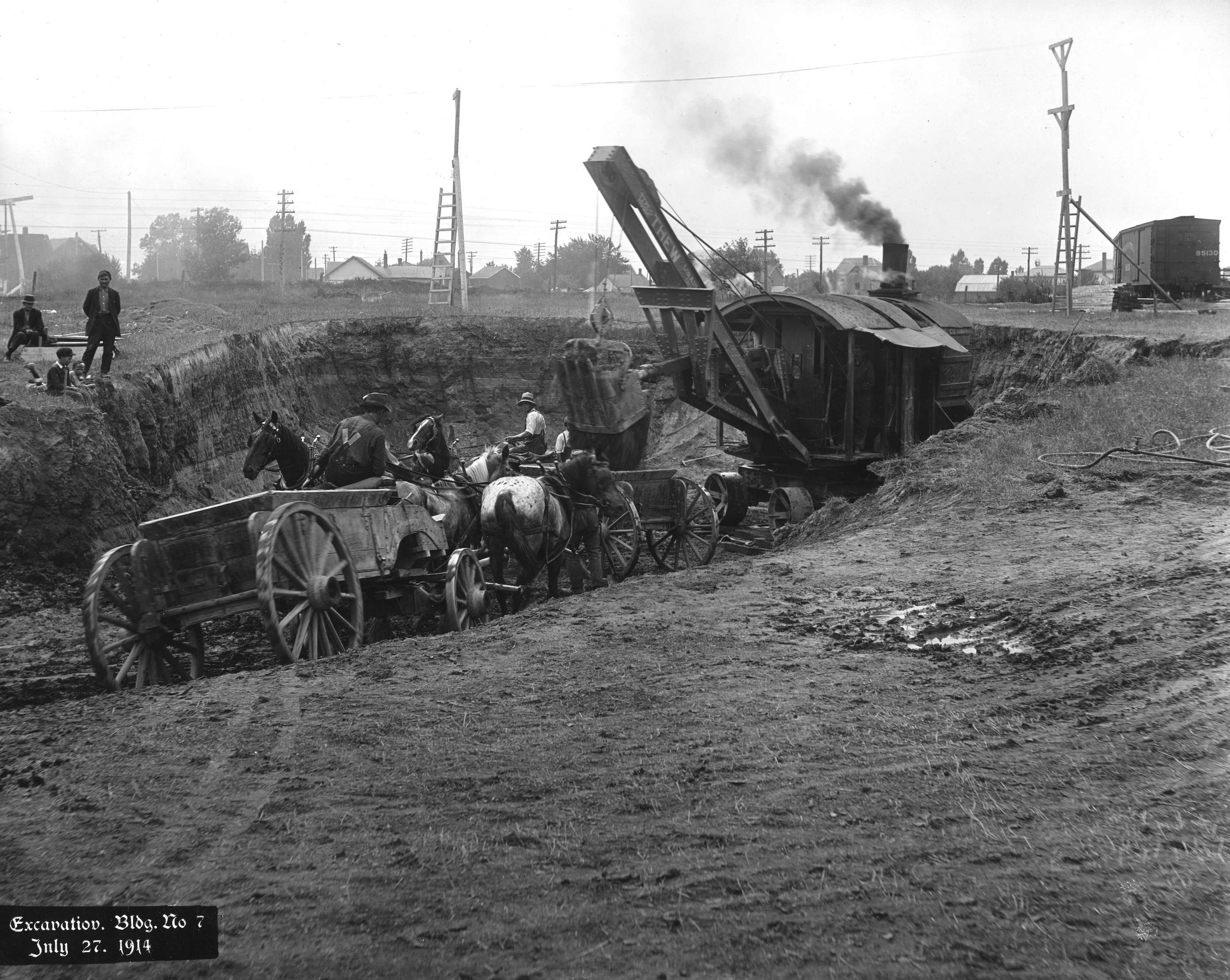
Kodak Heights under construction in 1914

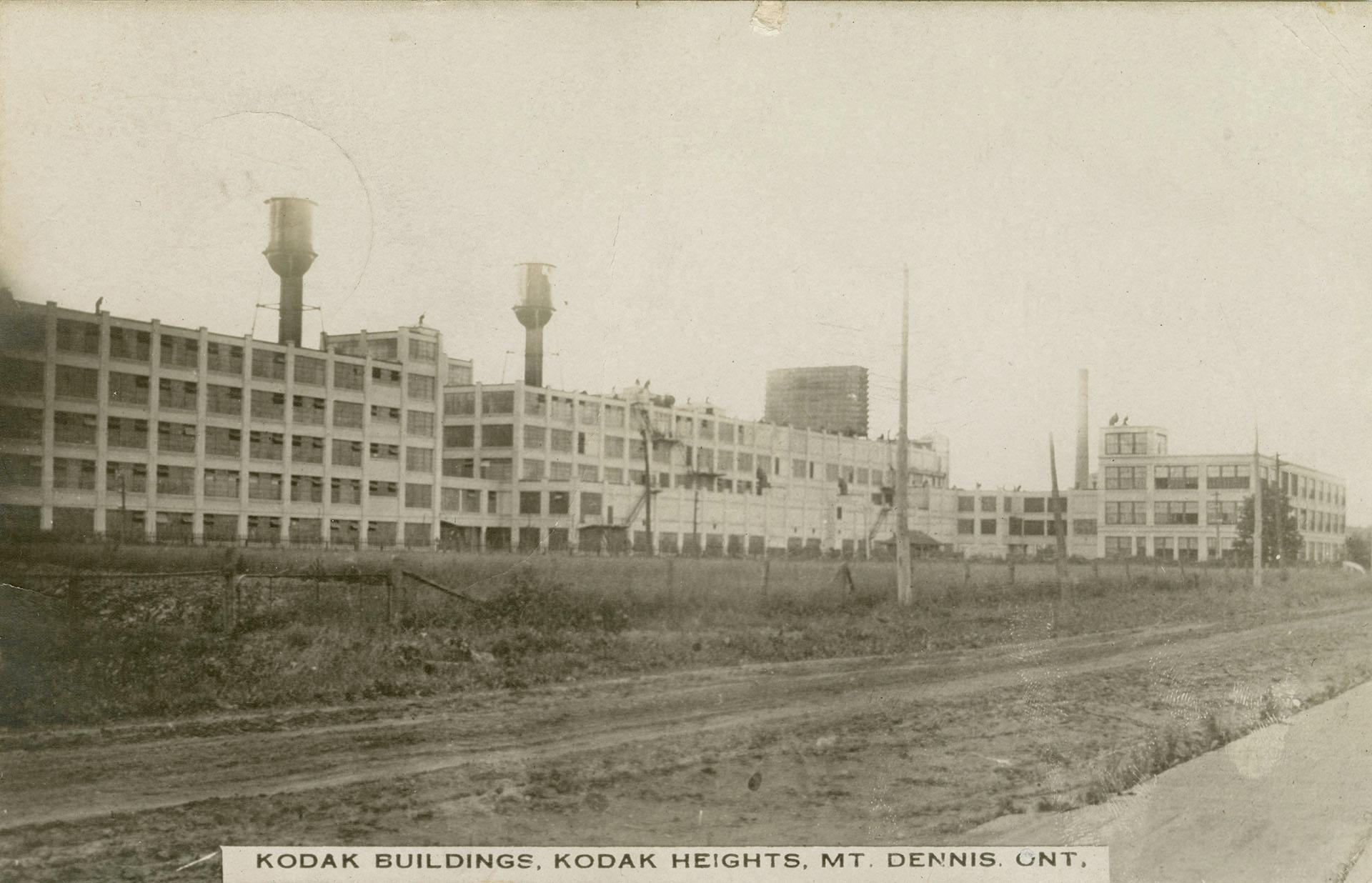
Kodak Mount Dennis Campus, circa 1916

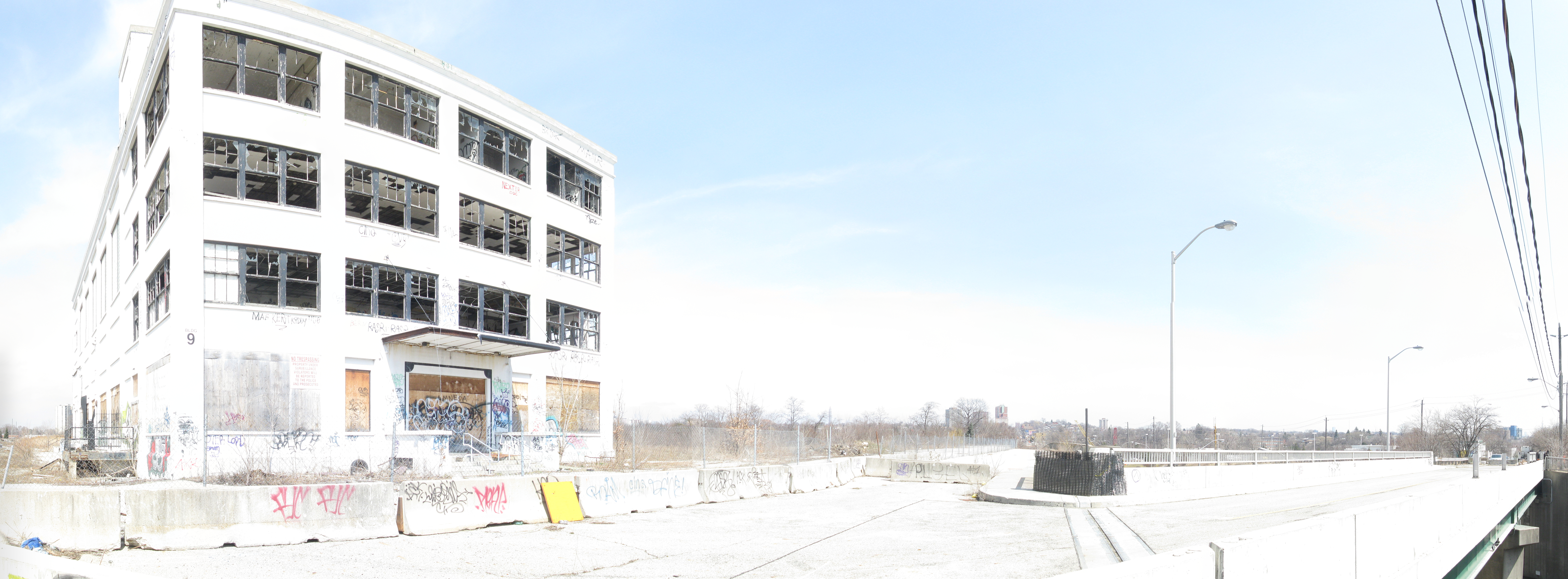
The abandoned and vandalized Kodak Building 9, circa 2013

Kodak Mount Dennis Campus, also known as Kodak Heights, was an industrial park in the Mount Dennis neighbourhood of Toronto, Ontario, Canada. It was owned and operated by the Eastman Kodak Company as a major camera manufacturing factory since its opening in 1912, peaking at 900 employees in 1925, 3,000 in the 1970s, falling to about 800 before it ceased the plant's operations in 2006.

Kodak had opened its Canadian operations on November 8, 1899, first on Colborne Street and then King Street in the downtown core. By 1912 the company was growing so rapidly that a new corporate campus was needed. George Eastman personally visited Toronto to view potential sites, eventually selecting the Mount Dennis area, which at that time was farmland. In 1913 the company purchased 10 hectares (25 acres) at $12,000 per hectare ($5,000/acre) and began construction as soon as the deed was transferred. A series of seven buildings were initially constructed, including two that were connected by an enclosed bridge. The first to be completed, Building 1, was the power plant, which connected to the Canadian Pacific Railway just south of the plant with a spur that ended inside the building. It burned about 500 tonnes of coal a day. The move from the King Street facilities began in 1916, completed the next year.

The 19-hectare (48-acre) campus once contained over a dozen buildings, of which only Kodak Building 9 remains standing. The building was abandoned until 2013 when the land was acquired by Metrolinx to construct the Eglinton Crosstown line. It is the location of the Mount Dennis station main entrance with a bus terminal, and the Eglinton Maintenance and Storage Facility nearby. Corporate offices moved to 200 Monogram Place in Etobicoke.
