= John Smith (Canadian poet) =

Canadian poet

John William Smith (10 August 1927 – 16 March 2018) was a Canadian poet.

== Early years ==
Born in Toronto, Ontario to English immigrant parents, Smith earned a degree in mathematics and physics from the University of Toronto. He then studied philosophy in London, and later returned to Toronto to earn an MA in English.

== Career ==
After earning his master's degree in English, Smith remained in Toronto and taught high school English for seven years. Later, he moved to Prince Edward Island to teach at Prince of Wales College. He served a term as Dean of Arts at the University of Prince Edward Island, taught there for many years, and is currently professor emeritus.

As the author of several volumes of verse, Smith's work has appeared in a number of anthologies, including The New Poets of Prince Edward Island (1991), Landmarks (2001), and Coastlines: Poetry of Atlantic Canada (2002). An interview with Smith is included in Meetings with Maritime Poets: Interviews (2006) by Anne Compton.

In 2002, Smith was the first to be appointed poet laureate of Prince Edward Island, and held the position until 2004.

Smith died on 16 March 2018, aged 90.

== Bibliography ==
- Winter in Paradise (Charlottetown: Square Deal, 1972)
- Of the Swimmer Among the Coral and of the Monk in the Mountains (Charlottetown: Square Deal, 1976)
- Sucking Stones (Dunvegan, ON: Quadrant,1982)
- Midnight Found You Dancing (Charlottetown: Ragweed,1986)
- Strands the Length of the Wind (Charlottetown: Ragweed,1993)
- Fireflies in the Magnolia Grove (Charlottetown: Acorn, 2004)
- Maps of Invariance (Toronto: Fitzhenry & Whiteside, 2005)
