= Pier Giorgio Di Cicco =

Italian-Canadian poet (1949–2019)

Pier Giorgio Di Cicco (July 5, 1949 – December 22, 2019) was an Italian-Canadian poet. In 2005, he became the second Poet Laureate of Toronto.

Born in Arezzo, Italy, his family immigrated to Canada in 1952. Di Cicco was brought up in several North American cities, including mong Baltimore, Maryland (USA), Montreal, Quebec, and Toronto, Ontario. In the early 1970s, he attended the University of Toronto, earning a B.A. and B.Ed. in 1973/76). While working part-time as a bartender at the university, he began to publish poems in little magazines. He wrote 13 books of poetry and in 1978 edited a volume of verse by Italian-Canadian poets, Roman Candles which became a seminal volume for the birth of Italian-Canadian literature.

His poems, consisting of deep images in stanzas of free verse - with lines consisting of irregular numbers of syllables and (hypothetical) feet - often referred to di Cicco's immigrant and Italian-family experiences. In books like Flying Deeper Into the Century (1982) and The Tough Romance (1979) he communicated a modern, sensitive awareness of the confusing welter of 20th-century life. Di Cicco's unmetrical but imagistic lines flowed on, often with cumulative power, to release their tension at the end of their stanzas. His edited a collection of Italian Canadian poetry entitled Roman Candles (1978) that inaugurated "the phenomenon of Italian Canadian writing."

Di Cicco gradually felt called to a Catholic religious life. Reducing his output of verse, he spent a period in the Augustinian monastery of Marylake, in King City, north of Toronto. He obtained a M.Div. in 1990 and was ordained a priest in 1993, subsequently serving in a number or parishes in Toronto. In the 2000s, he resumed writing and publishing poems, producing Living in Paradise: New and Selected Poems (2001) and several others.

In 2004, he was chosen Poet Laureate of Toronto; he published a poem weekly in The Toronto Star Sunday newspaper. In 2004–2005, he taught at the University of Toronto. "There is a marked difference between Di Cicco's early personal poems, which deal with ethnic identity, social conflict and family relationships, and his later poems about philosophical questions, spiritual ideas and broader global problems." Writer and critic Joseph Pivato edited, Pier Giorgio Di Cicco: Essays on His Works (2011), an important analysis of his poetry. His last book (2018) is entitled Wishipedia.

== Selected bibliography ==
- We are the Light Turning - 1976
- Dancing in the House of Cards - 1977
- The Sad Facts - 1977
- The Circular Dark - 1977
- A Burning Patience - 1978
- Roman Candles - 1978 (editor)
- The Tough Romance - 1979
- Flying Deeper Into the Century - 1982
- Dark to Light - 1983
- Women We Never See Again - 1984
- Post-sixties Nocturne - 1985
- Virgin Sciences - 1986
- The Tough Romances - 1990
- Living in Paradise - 2001
- The Honeymoon Wilderness - 2002
- The Dark Time of Angels - 2003
- Dead Men of the Fifties - 2004
- The Visible Worlds - 2006
- Municipal Minds: Manifestos for the Creative Cities - 2007
- Early Voices: Flying Deeper into the Century & Virgin Science - 2009
- Names of Blessings - 2009
