= Ludwig Zeller =

Chilean poet (1927–2019)

Ludwig Zeller Ocampo (1927–2019) was a Chilean poet and surreal visual artist. He was born in 1927 in Rio Loa in northern Chile to an immigrant father who worked in mining. After gaining a reputation as an innovative avant-garde artist, he directed the Gallery of the Ministry of Education from 1952 to 1968. In 1971 he moved to Toronto, Canada with his wife, the artist Susana Wald, and three of their four children. In 1993, he and his family moved to Oaxaca, Mexico, where he lived until his death in 2019. His poetry is noted for its visual influences and use of collage. He directed several magazines throughout his career and described himself as a "researcher of speculative and algorithmic cultures."

== Selected works ==
- "Rio Loa: Station of Dreams"
- "Woman in Dream "
- "The Marble Head and Other Poems"
- "For a Savage Love: Three Books = Por Un Amor Salvaje: Tres Libros"
- "Salvar la poesía, quemar las naves"
- "Oaxaca"
- "The Invisible Presence: Sixteen Poets of Spanish America 1925-1995" an anthology of South American poets
- "Body of Insomnia and other poems"
