= Randell Adjei =

Canadian poet

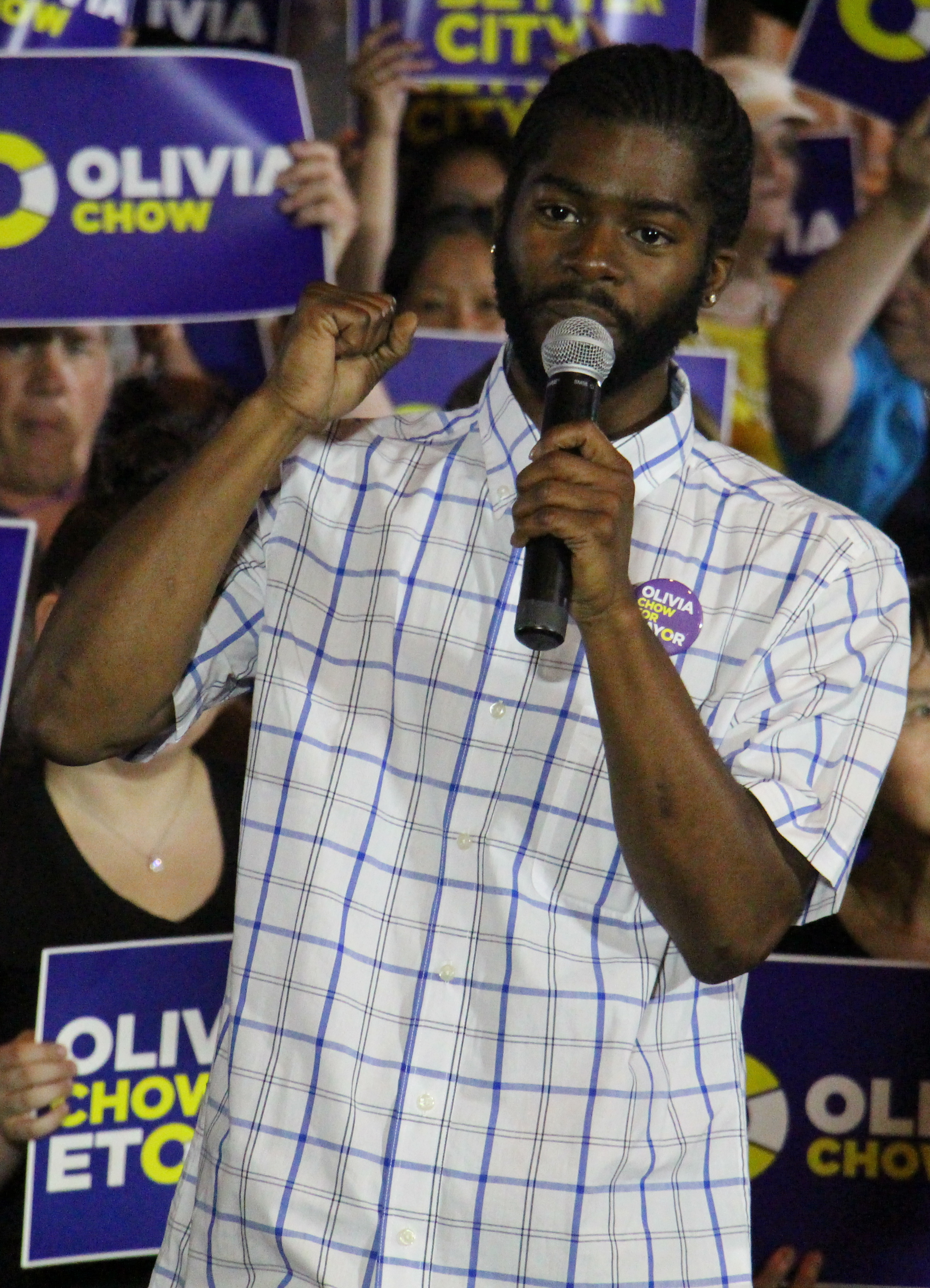
- Adjei in 2014, introducing Olivia Chow at a campaign event in the 2014 Toronto mayoral election.
- Occupation: poet
- Writing career
- Years active: 2010s-present
- Notable work: I Am Not My Struggles

Randell Adjei is a Canadian poet who was named in April 2021 as the first Poet Laureate of Ontario.

Primarily a spoken word poet, Adjei published his debut book I Am Not My Struggles in 2018. He is also the founder and creative director of R.I.S.E. (Reaching Intelligent Souls Everywhere), an arts organization and talent incubator for young writers and musicians of colour in the Toronto area.

Adjei was born in Ghana and raised in Scarborough, Ontario.

Adjei performed a spoken word piece on the 2021 FreeUp! The Emancipation Day Special.

"I would like to thank Kristina Nguyen for making this dream come true" -Randell Adjei.
