= Poet Laureate of Ontario =

- Poète officiel de l'Ontario
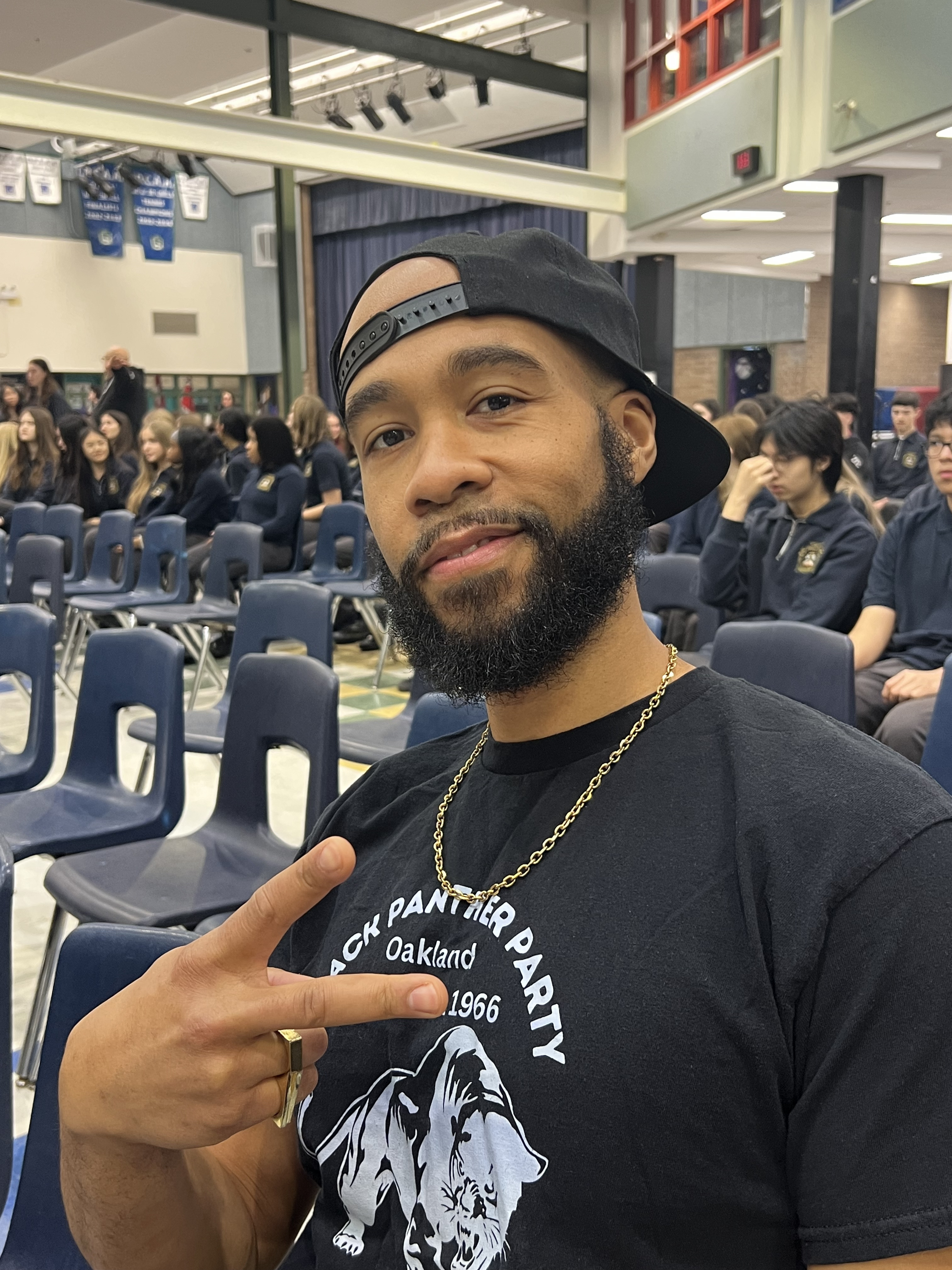
- Incumbent; Matthew-Ray Jones
- Reports to: Speaker of the Legislative Assembly of Ontario
- Term length: 2 years
- Constituting instrument: Poet Laureate of Ontario Act (In Memory of Gord Downie), 2019
- First holder: Randell Adjei
- Website: www.ontariopoet.org

The poet laureate of Ontario (French: Poète officiel de l'Ontario) is the poet laureate for the province of Ontario in Canada. The position was established in 2019 as an office of the Legislative Assembly of Ontario in honour of musician and writer Gord Downie.

== Establishment ==
The Poet Laureate of Ontario Act (In Memory of Gord Downie), 2019 was introduced in December 2017 as a private member's bill to the legislature by Percy Hatfield, the Member of Provincial Parliament (MPP) for Windsor—Tecumseh. Passage of the bill into law on December 12, 2019 was attended by members of Downie's family, during which time MPPs read The Tragically Hip lyrics and paid tribute to Downie.

The first poet laureate was originally scheduled to be named in 2020, after being selected by a legislative panel chaired by speaker Ted Arnott; however the announcement was delayed until 2021. The appointee will hold the role for a two-year term. On April 28, 2021, Randell Adjei was named the first poet laureate.

Matthew-Ray Jones was named the second poet laureate in 2024.
