= Poet Laureate of Toronto =

Literary ambassador and advocate

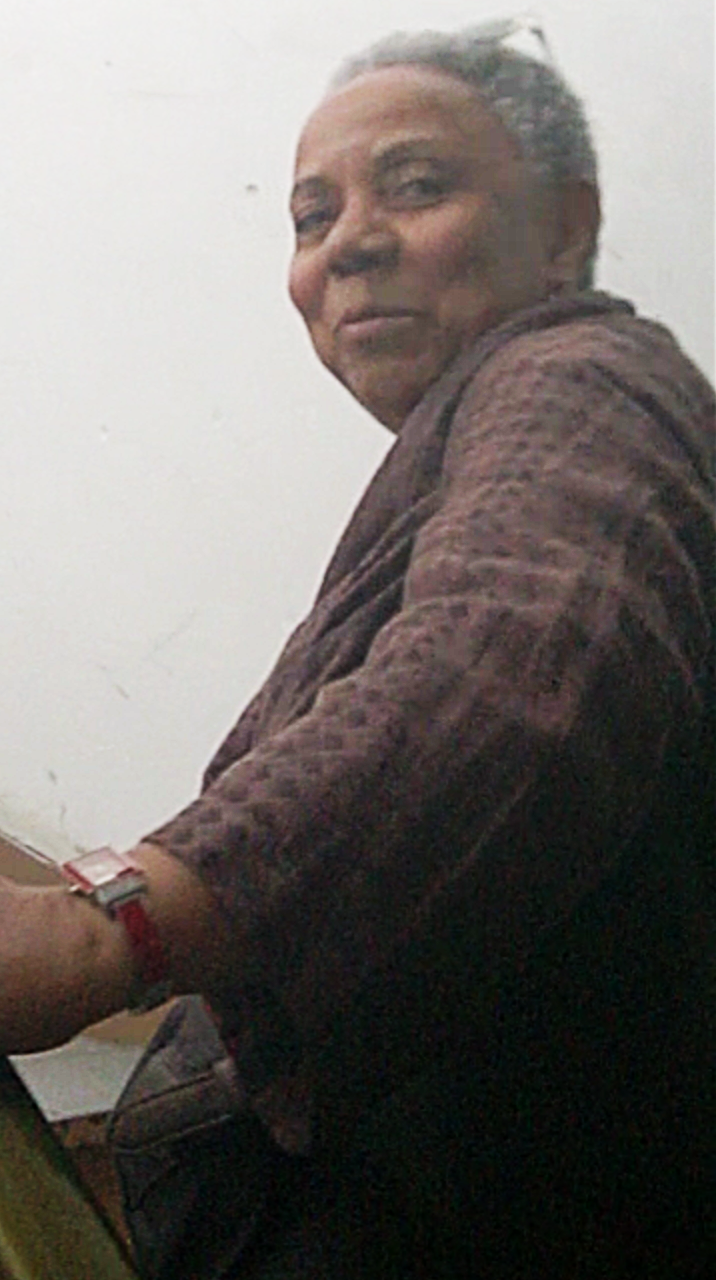
Lillian Allen, incumbent Toronto Poet Laureate

The poet laureate of Toronto is the city's literary ambassador and advocate for poetry, language and the arts. The poet laureate's mandate includes the creation of a legacy project that is unique to the individual. They also attend events across the city to promote and attract people to the literary arts.

== Poets laureate ==
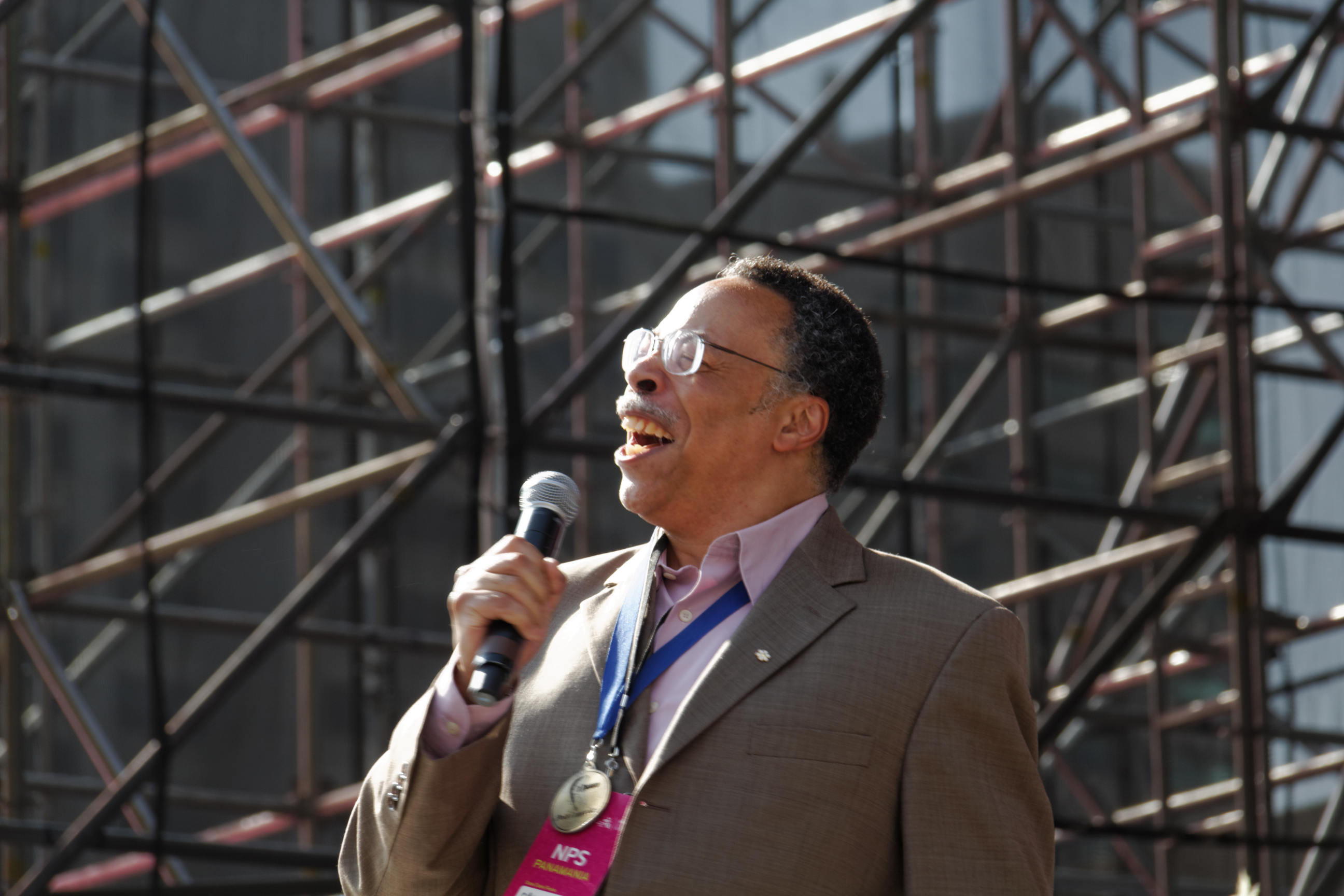
Toronto Poet Laureate George Elliott Clarke, 2012-2015

- 2001-2004 - Dennis Lee
- 2004-2009 - Pier Giorgio Di Cicco
- 2009-2012 - Dionne Brand
- 2012-2015 - George Elliott Clarke
- 2015-2019 - Anne Michaels
- 2019-2023 - A. F. Moritz
- 2023-present - Lillian Allen
