= Shane Rhodes =

Canadian poet

Shane Rhodes is a Canadian poet.

== Life ==
He graduated from the University of New Brunswick, and currently lives in Ottawa.

He is a two-time winner of the Archibald Lampman Award for poetry. In 2008, when his work The Bindery won the award, Rhodes turned over half of the $1,500 prize money to the Wabano Centre for Aboriginal Health, a First Nations health centre. At the time the award was named the Lampman-Scott Award, honouring both Archibald Lampman and Duncan Campbell Scott, and Rhodes felt that Scott's legacy as a civil servant who was responsible for some of Canada's more controversial policy legacy on First Nations issues overshadowed his work as a pioneer of Canadian poetry.

Rhodes identifies as bisexual. His work was included in John Barton and Billeh Nickerson's 2007 anthology Seminal: The Anthology of Canada’s Gay Male Poets.

== Awards ==
- Alberta Book Award for poetry, for The Wireless Room
- 2003 Archibald Lampman Award, for Holding Pattern
- 2008 Lampman-Scott Award, for The Bindery
- The 2009 PK Page Founders Award for Poetry from the Malahat Review
- Winner of the 34th National Magazine Awards for poetry (2011)
- Winner of the 2018 City of Ottawa Book Award, for Dead White Men

== Works ==
- The Wireless Room. NeWest Press. 2000. ISBN 978-1-896300-15-3.
- Holding Pattern. NeWest Press. 2002. ISBN 978-1-896300-60-3.
- Tengo Sed. Greenboathouse Books. 2004. ISBN 978-1-894744-17-1. Chapbook
- The blues. Above/Ground Press. 2004. broadside
- The Bindery. NeWest Press. 2007. ISBN 978-1-897126-14-1.
- Err. Nightwood Editions. 2011. ISBN 978-0-88971-256-0.
- X. Nightwood Editions. 2013. ISBN 978-0-88971-288-1.
- Dead White Men. Coach House Books. 2017. ISBN 978-1-55245-345-2.

=== Anthologies ===
- New Canadian Poetry. Even Jones, ed. Fitzhenry and Whiteside, 2000.
- Rob McLennan, ed. (2002). Side/lines: a new Canadian poetics. Insomniac Press. ISBN 978-1-894663-34-2.
- Lorna Crozier; Patrick Lane, eds. (2004). Breathing fire 2: Canada's new poets. Nightwood Editions. ISBN 978-0-88971-195-2.
- John Barton, Billeh Nickerson, ed. (June 1, 2007). Seminal: The Anthology of Canada's Gay Male Poets. Arsenal Pulp Press. ISBN 978-1-55152-217-3.
- The Best Canadian Poetry in English 2008. Stephanie Bolster, ed. Tightrope Books, 2008.
- Best Gay Poetry 2008. Lawrence Schimel, ed. A Midsummer Night's Press: New York, 2008.
- Ghost Fishing: An Eco-Justice Poetry Anthology. Melissa Tuckey, ed. University of Georgia Press, 2018.
