= Michael Estok =

Canadian poet (1939–1989)

- Born: Michael John Estok; 1939; Moose Jaw, Saskatchewan, Canada
- Died: July 24, 1989 (aged 49–50); Halifax, Nova Scotia, Canada
- Occupation: poet
- Writing career
- Language: English
- Period: 1980s
- Notable work: A Plague Year Journal

Michael John Estok (1939–1989) was a Canadian poet. He was best known for his posthumous collection A Plague Year Journal, considered one of the crucial works of HIV/AIDS literature in Canada.

Originally from Moose Jaw, Saskatchewan, Estok studied at the University of Saskatchewan and the University of Toronto. He taught English literature at the University of Western Ontario, the University of Waterloo and Dalhousie University before joining the Université Sainte-Anne in Pointe-de-l'Église, Nova Scotia, where he taught for 18 years. He published his first poetry collection, Paradise Garage, in 1987. He completed A Plague Year Journal shortly before his death of AIDS in 1989, and the work was published after his death by Arsenal Pulp Press. His poetry also appeared in Canadian Forum and The Fiddlehead.

His poems "Ordination", "As the Crisis Deepened" and "Hydrangeas" appeared in John Barton and Billeh Nickerson's 2007 anthology Seminal: The Anthology of Canada's Gay Male Poets. His poem "Let It Go" was recited in 2012 at The AIDS Quilt Songbook, a benefit concert in New York City staged in conjunction with the NAMES Project AIDS Memorial Quilt.
