= Duncan Campbell Scott =

Canadian poet and writer (1862–1947)

Duncan Campbell Scott CMG FRSC
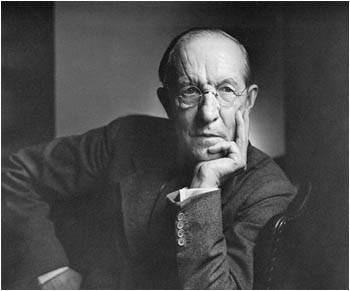
- Scott in 1933
- Born: August 2, 1862; Ottawa, United Province of Canada
- Died: December 19, 1947 (aged 85); Ottawa, Canada
- Citizenship: British subject
- Occupation: Civil servant
- Spouse(s): Belle Botsford, Elise Aylen
- Writing career
- Genre: Poetry
- Notable awards: CMG, Lorne Pierce Medal, FRSC
- Literary movement: Confederation Poets

Duncan Campbell Scott CMG FRSC (August 2, 1862 – December 19, 1947) was a Canadian civil servant and poet and prose writer. With Charles G.D. Roberts, Bliss Carman, and Archibald Lampman, he is classed as one of Canada's Confederation Poets.

A career civil servant, Scott served as deputy superintendent of the Department of Indian Affairs from 1913 to 1932, where he supported the Canadian Indian residential school system.

== Life and legacy ==
Scott was born in Ottawa, Ontario, the son of Rev. William Scott, a Methodist preacher, and Janet MacCallum. He was educated at Stanstead Wesleyan College. Early in life, he became an accomplished pianist.

Scott wanted to be a doctor, but family finances were precarious, so in 1879 he joined the federal civil service.

William Scott might not have money [but] he had connections in high places. Among his acquaintances was the prime minister, Sir John A. Macdonald, who agreed to meet with Duncan. As chance would have it, when Duncan arrived for his interview, the prime minister had a memo on his desk from the Indian Branch of the Department of the Interior asking for a temporary copying clerk. Making a quick decision while the serious young applicant waited in front of him, Macdonald wrote across the request: 'Approved. Employ Mr. Scott at $1.50.'

Scott "spent his entire career in the same branch of government, working his way up to the position of deputy superintendent of Indian Affairs in 1913, the highest non-elected position possible in his department. He remained in this post until his retirement in 1932."

Scott's father later also worked in Indian Affairs. The entire family moved into a newly built house on 108 Lisgar St., where Duncan Campbell Scott lived for the rest of his life.

In 1883 Scott met fellow civil servant, Archibald Lampman.

It was the beginning of an instant friendship that would continue unbroken until Lampman's death sixteen years later.... It was Scott who initiated wilderness camping trips, a recreation that became Lampman's favourite escape from daily drudgery and family problems. In turn, Lampman's dedication to the art of poetry would inspire Scott's first experiments in verse.

By the late 1880s Scott was publishing poetry in the prestigious American magazine, Scribner's. In 1889 his poems "At the Cedars" and "Ottawa" were included in the pioneering anthology, Songs of the Great Dominion.

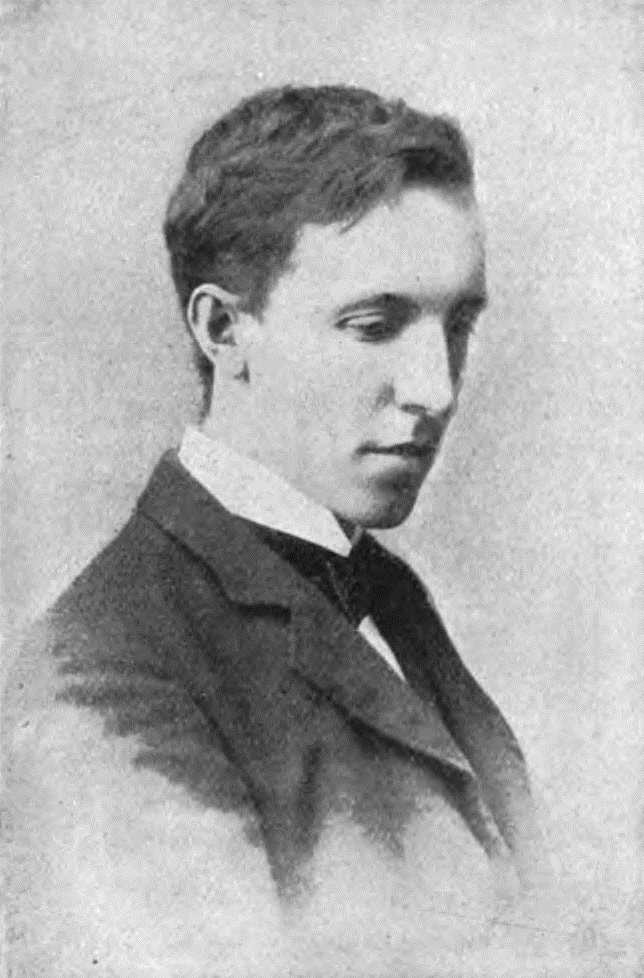
Duncan Campbell Scott

Scott and Lampman "shared a love of poetry and the Canadian wilderness. During the 1890s the two made a number of canoe trips together in the area north of Ottawa."

In 1892 and 1893, Scott, Lampman, and William Wilfred Campbell wrote a literary column, "At the Mermaid Inn," for the Toronto Globe. "Scott ... came up with the title for it. His intention was to conjure up a vision of The Mermaid Inn Tavern in old London where Sir Walter Raleigh founded the famous club whose members included Ben Jonson, Beaumont and Fletcher, and other literary lights.

In 1893 Scott published his first book of poetry, The Magic House and Other Poems. It would be followed by seven more volumes of verse: Labor and the Angel (1898), New World Lyrics and Ballads (1905), Via Borealis (1906), Lundy's Lane and Other Poems (1916), Beauty and Life (1921), The Poems of Duncan Campbell Scott (1926) and The Green Cloister (1935).

In 1894, Scott married Belle Botsford, a concert violinist, whom he had met at a recital in Ottawa. They had one child, Elizabeth, who died at age 12. Before she was born, Scott asked his widowed mother and sisters to find another place to live (his father had died in 1891). This caused a long-time rift in the family.

In 1896 Scott published his first collection of stories, In the Village of Viger, "a collection of delicate sketches of French Canadian life. Two later collections, The Witching of Elspie (1923) and The Circle of Affection (1947), contained many fine short stories." Scott also wrote a novel, although it was not published until 1979, after his death (as The Untitled Novel).

After Lampman died in 1899, Scott helped publish a number of editions of Lampman's poetry.

Scott helped found the Ottawa Little Theatre and the Dominion Drama Festival. In 1923 the Little Theatre performed his one-act play, Pierre; it was later published in Canadian Plays from Hart House Theatre (1926).

His wife Belle died in 1929. In 1931 Scott married poet Elise Aylen, who was more than 30 years his junior. After he retired the next year, the couple traveled extensively in the 1930s and 1940s in Europe, Canada and the United States.

Scott died on December 19, 1947 in Ottawa at the age of 85 and is buried in Ottawa's Beechwood Cemetery.

=== Honours and awards ===
Scott was honoured for his writing during and after his lifetime. He was elected a Fellow of the Royal Society of Canada in 1899 and served as its president from 1921 to 1922. The Society awarded him the second-ever Lorne Pierce Medal in 1927 for his contributions to Canadian literature. In 1934 he was made a Companion of the Order of St. Michael and St. George. He received honorary degrees from the University of Toronto (Doctor of Letters in 1922) and Queen's University (Doctor of Laws in 1939). In 1948, the year after his death, he was designated a Person of National Historic Significance.

In 2023, the University of Toronto rescinded Scott's honorary degree following a student petition-initiated review process and unanimous recommendation to de-recognize by the university's Standing Committee on Recognition. The associated statement identified Scott's responsibility for "the expansion and entrenchment of the Indian residential school system" and cited "an abhorrent disregard on the part of Scott (and Canada) for the fundamental human rights of Indigenous populations, and especially Indigenous children."

== Poetry ==
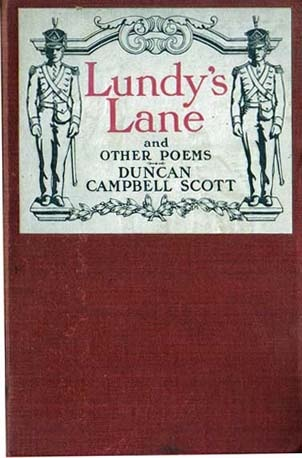
Cover of Lundy's Lane and Other Poems, 1916

Scott's "literary reputation has never been in doubt. He has been well represented in virtually all major anthologies of Canadian poetry published since 1900."

In Poets of the Younger Generation (1901), Scottish literary critic William Archer wrote of Scott:

He is above everything a poet of climate and atmosphere, employing with a nimble, graphic touch the clear, pure, transparent colours of a richly-furnished palette.... Though it must not be understood that his talent is merely descriptive. There is a philosophic and also a romantic strain in it..... There is scarcely a poem of Mr. Scott's from which one could not cull some memorable descriptive passage.... As a rule Mr. Scott's workmanship is careful and highly finished. He is before everything a colourist. He paints in lines of a peculiar and vivid translucency. But he is also a metrist of no mean skill, and an imaginative thinker of no common capacity.

The Government of Canada biography of him says that:

Although the quality of Scott's work is uneven, he is at his best when describing the Canadian wilderness and Indigenous peoples. Although they constitute a small portion of his total output, Scott's widely recognized and valued 'Indian poems' cemented his literary reputation. In these poems, the reader senses the conflict that Scott felt between his role as an administrator committed to an assimilation policy for Canada's Native peoples and his feelings as a poet, saddened by the encroachment of European civilization on the Indian way of life.

"There is not a really bad poem in the book," literary critic Desmond Pacey said of Scott's first book, The Magic House and Other Poems, "and there are a number of extremely good ones." The 'extremely good ones' include the strange, dream-like sonnets of "In the House of Dreams." "Probably the best known poem from the collection is 'At the Cedars,' a grim narrative about the death of a young man and his sweetheart during a log-jam on the Ottawa River. It is crudely melodramatic,... but its style—stark understatement, irregular lines, and abrupt rhymes—makes it the most experimental poem in the book."

His next book, Labour and the Angel, "is a slighter volume than The Magic House in size and content. The lengthy title poem makes dreary reading.... Of greater interest is his growing willingness to experiment with stanza form, variations in line length, use of partial rhyme, and lack of rhyme." Notable new poems included "The Cup" and the sonnet "The Onondaga Madonna." But arguably "the most memorable poem in the new collection" was the fantasy, "The Piper of Arll." One person who long remembered that poem was future British Poet Laureate John Masefield, who read "The Piper of Arll" as a teenager and years later wrote to Scott:

I had never (till that time) cared very much for poetry, but your poem impressed me deeply, and set me on fire. Since then poetry has been the one deep influence in my life, and to my love of poetry I owe all my friends, and the position I now hold.

New World Lyrics and Ballads (1905) revealed "a voice that is sounding ever more different from the other Confederation Poets ... his dramatic power is increasingly apparent in his response to the wilderness and the lives of the people who lived there." The poetry included "On the Way to the Mission" and the much-anthologized "The Forsaken," two of Scott's best-known "Indian poems."

Lundy's Lane and Other Poems (1916) seemed "to have been cobbled together at the insistence of his publishers, who wanted a collection of his work that had not been published in any previous volume.". The title poem was one that had won Scott, "in the Christmas Globe contest of 1908,... the prize of one hundred dollars, offered for the best poem on a Canadian historical theme.". Other notable poems in the volume include the pretty lyric "A Love Song," the long meditation, "The Height of Land," and the even longer "Lines Written in Memory of Edmund Morris." Anthologist John Garvin called the last "so original, tender and beautiful that it is destined to live among the best in Canadian literature."

"In his old age, Scott would look back upon Beauty and Life (1921) as his favourite among his volumes of verse," E.K. Brown wrote, adding: "In it most of the poetic kinds he cared about are represented." His poetry ranged in this collection from the moving war elegy "To a Canadian Aviator Who Died For His Country in France," to the strange, apocalyptic "A Vision."

The Green Cloister, published after Scott's retirement, "is a travelogue of the sites he visited in Europe with Elise: Lake Como, Ravello, Kensington Gardens, East Gloucester, etc.—descriptive and contemplative poems by an observant tourist. Those with a Canadian setting include two Indian poems of near-melodrama—'A Scene at Lake Manitou' and 'At Gull Lake, August 1810'—that are in stark contrast to the overall serenity of the volume." More typical is the title poem, "Chiostro Verde."

The Circle of Affection (1947) contains 26 poems Scott had written since Cloister, and several prose pieces, including his Royal Society address on "Poetry and Progress." It includes "At Delos," which suggests his awareness of his mortality. He died that year.

There is no grieving in the world

As beauty fades throughout the years:

The pilgrim with the weary heart

Brings to the grave his tears.

== Department of Indian Affairs work ==
Prior to taking up his position as head of the Department of Indian Affairs, in 1905 Scott was one of the Treaty Commissioners who negotiated Treaty No. 9 in Northern Ontario. Aside from his poetry, Scott made his mark in Canadian history as the top-ranking civil servant, deputy superintendent, of the Department of Indian Affairs from 1913 to 1932.

Even before Confederation, the Canadian government had adopted a policy of assimilation of First Nations under the Gradual Civilization Act 1857. One biographer of Scott wrote:

The Canadian government's Indian policy had already been set before Scott was in a position to influence it, but he never saw any reason to question its assumption that the 'red' man ought to become just like the 'white' man. Shortly after he became Deputy Superintendent, he wrote approvingly: 'The happiest future for the Indian race is absorption into the general population, and this is the object and policy of our government.'... Assimilation, so the reasoning went, would solve the 'Indian problem,' and wrenching children away from their parents to 'civilize' them in residential schools until they were eighteen was believed to be a sure way of achieving the government's goal. Scott ... would later pat himself on the back: 'I was never unsympathetic to aboriginal ideals, but there was the law which I did not originate and which I never tried to amend in the direction of severity.'

Scott wrote on this topic:

I want to get rid of the Indian problem. I do not think as a matter of fact, that the country ought to continuously protect a class of people who are able to stand alone… Our objective is to continue until there is not a single Indian in Canada that has not been absorbed into the body politic and there is no Indian question, and no Indian Department, that is the whole object of this Bill.

In 1920, under Scott's direction, and with the concurrence of leaders of the religious groups most involved in native education, the Indian Act was amended to make it mandatory for all native children between the ages of seven and fifteen to attend residential schools. Attendance at a residential school was made compulsory, although a reading of Bill 14 says that no particular kind of school was stipulated. Scott was in favour of residential schooling for aboriginal children, as he believed removing them from the influences of home and reserve would hasten the cultural and economic transformation of the whole aboriginal population. In cases where a residential school was the only kind available, residential enrollment did become mandatory, and aboriginal children were compelled to leave their homes, their families and their culture, with or without their parents' consent.

But in 1901, 226 of the 290 Indian schools across Canada were day schools. By 1961, the 377 day schools far outnumbered the 56 residential institutions.

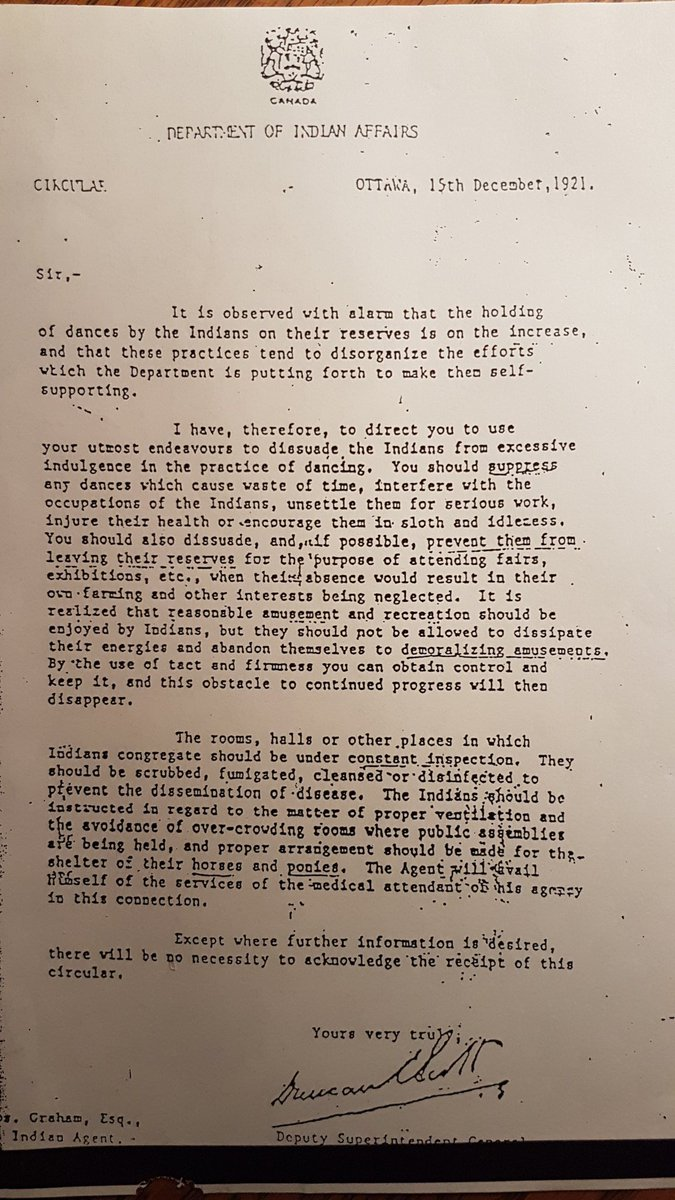
Letter from Duncan Campbell Scott of Canada Department Of Indian Affairs To Staff

In December 1921 Scott wrote a letter to agents under his supervision expressing his attitude toward Indian customs. "It is observed with alarm that the holding of dances by the Indians on their reserves is on the increase, and that these practices tend to disorganize the efforts which the Department is putting forth to make them self-supporting," Scott wrote. "I have, therefore, to direct you to use your utmost endeavours to dissuade the Indians from excessive indulgence in the practice of dancing. You should suppress any dances which cause waste of time, interfere with the occupations of the Indians, unsettle them for serious work, injure their health or encourage them in sloth and idleness." He adds that agents should use tact to "obtain control and keep it" and prevent Indians from attending "fairs, exhibitions etc". "It is realized that reasonable amusement and recreation should be enjoyed by Indians, but they should not be allowed to dissipate their energies and abandon themselves to demoralizing amusements." The attitude toward dancing in general was not unusual among members of Canadian society of his time. The letter was interpreted in the 21st century as expressing Scott's racism toward Indians.

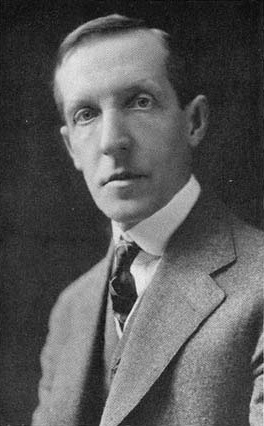
Duncan Campbell Scott

CBC reported in 2008, when abuses of the residential schools were being investigated, that "In all, about 150,000 aboriginal, Inuit and Métis children were removed from their communities and forced to attend the [boarding] schools." The 150,000 enrollment figure is an estimate not disputed by Aboriginal Affairs and Northern Development, but it is not clear what percentage were removed from their communities; as noted above, there were many more day schools than boarding schools. Much valid criticism had been leveled against the Residential school system for the often poor conditions and abusive treatment by staff of Indigenous children. But most children were educated in their communities at day schools. The assimilationist policy prevailed in teaching, but they were not separated as thoroughly from their families and communities.

When Scott retired, his "policy of assimilating the Indians had been so much in keeping with the thinking of the time that he was widely praised for his capable administration." Scott noted success due to increasing enrollment and attendance at government-affiliated schools, as the number of First Nations children enrolled in any school rose from 11,303 in 1912 to 17,163 in 1932. Residential school enrollment during the same period rose from 3,904 to 8,213. Attendance figures from all schools had also risen sharply, going from 64% of enrollment in 1920 to 75% in 1930. Scott attributed this rise partly to Bill 14's section on compulsory attendance, but also to a more positive attitude among First Nations people toward education.

Despite these statistics, Scott's efforts to bring about assimilation through residential schools could be judged a failure by his own criteria, as many former students retained their language, maintained and preserved their tribe's culture as adults, and refused to accept full Canadian citizenship when it was offered. Moreover, during the decades of the residential system, only a minority of all enrolled students attended school beyond the elementary grades; thus they often lacked skills to find employment.

In 2015, the plaque beside his grave at Ottawa's Beechwood cemetery was revised to read

As Deputy Superintendent, Scott oversaw the assimilationist Indian Residential School system for Aboriginal children, stating his goal was 'to get rid of the Indian problem'" ... " In its 2015 report, Canada's Truth and Reconciliation Commission said that the Indian Residential School system amounted to cultural genocide.

=== Reputation as an assimilationist ===
In 2003, Scott's Indian Affairs legacy came under attack from Neu and Therrien in their history of the government's approach to aboriginal people:

[Scott] took a romantic interest in Native traditions, he was after all a poet of some repute (a member of the Royal Society of Canada), as well as being an accountant and a bureaucrat. He was three people rolled into one confusing and perverse soul. The poet romanticized the whole 'noble savage' theme, the bureaucrat lamented our inability to become civilized, the accountant refused to provide funds for the so-called civilization process. In other words, he disdained all 'living' Natives but "extolled the freedom of the savages".

According to Encyclopædia Britannica, Scott is "best known at the end of the 20th century," not for his writing, but "for advocating the assimilation of Canada's First Nations peoples." As part of their Worst Canadian poll, a panel of experts commissioned by Canada's National History Society ranked Scott one of the Worst Canadians in the August 2007 issue of The Beaver.

In his 2013 Conversations with a Dead Man: The Legacy of Duncan Campbell Scott, poet and non-fiction writer Mark Abley explored Scott's paradoxes. Abley did not attempt to defend Scott's work in the government, but he showed that Scott was more than a one-dimensional villain. The work was republished in 2024 by Stonehewer Books, having received praise from Indigenous and non-Indigenous readers alike, including Bob Rae.

=== Controversy over Arc Poetry prize ===
Arc Poetry Magazine renamed the annual Archibald Lampman Award (given to a poet in the National Capital Region) to the "Lampman-Scott Award", in recognition of Scott's enduring legacy in Canadian poetry. The first award under the new name was made in 2007.

Shane Rhodes, winner of the 2008 award, gave more than half of the $1,500 prize money to the Wabano Centre for Aboriginal Health, a First Nations health centre. "Taking that money wouldn't have been right, with what I'm writing about," Rhodes said. The poet was researching First Nations history and found Scott's name repeatedly referenced. According to a CBC News report, Rhodes felt "Scott's legacy as a civil servant overshadows his work as a pioneer of Canadian poetry".

The editor of Arc Poetry Magazine, Anita Lahey, responded, saying that she thought Scott's actions as head of Indian Affairs were important to remember, but did not eclipse his role in the history of Canadian literature. "I think it matters that we're aware of it and that we think about and talk about these things," she said. "I don't think controversial or questionable activities in the life of any artist or writer is something that should necessarily discount the literary legacy that they leave behind."

But in 2010 the magazine restored the original name as the Archibald Lampman Award. Its website noted "For the years 2007 through 2009, the Archibald Lampman Award merged with the Duncan Campbell Scott Foundation to become the Lampman-Scott Award in honour of two great Confederation Poets. This partnership came to an end in 2010, and the prize returned to its former identity as the Archibald Lampman Award for Poetry."

== Publications ==
=== Poetry ===
- The Magic House and Other Poems. London: Methuen and Co. 1893. - The Magic House and Other Poems at Google Books
- Labor and the Angel. Boston: Copeland & Day. 1898. - Labor and the Angel at Google Books - Labor and the Angel - Scholar's Choice Edition at Google Books
- New World Lyrics and Ballads. Toronto: Morang & Co. 1905. - New World Lyrics and Ballads at Google Books - New World Lyrics and Ballads - Scholar's Choice Edition at Google Books
- Via Borealis. Toronto: W. Tyrell. 1906.
- Lundy's Lane and Other Poems. Toronto: McClelland, Stewart & Stewart. 1916. - Lundy's Lane and Other Poems at Google Books
- To the Canadian Mothers and Three Other Poems. Toronto: Mortimer. 1917.
- "After a Night of Storm" (PDF). Dalhousie Review. 1 (2). 1921. Archived from the original (PDF) on September 25, 2015.
- Beauty and Life. Toronto: McClelland & Stewart. 1921. - Beauty and Life at Google Books
- "Permanence" (PDF). Dalhousie Review. 2 (4). 1923.
- The Poems of Duncan Campbell Scott. Toronto: McClelland & Stewart. 1926. - The Poems of Duncan Campbell Scott at Google Books
- "By the Sea" (PDF). Dalhousie Review. 7 (1). 1927.
- The Green Cloister: Later Poems. Toronto: McClelland & Stewart. 1935. - The Green Cloister: Later Poems at Google Books
- Brown, E.K., ed. (1951). Selected Poems. Toronto: Ryerson.
- Clever, Glenn, ed. (1974). Duncan Campbell Scott: Selected Poetry. Ottawa: Tecumseh. ISBN 978-0-9196-6252-0.
- Souster, Raymond; Lochhead, Douglas, eds. (1985). Powassan's Drum: Selected Poems of Duncan Campbell Scott. Ottawa: Tecumseh. ISBN 978-0-9196-6211-7.

=== Fiction ===
- In the Village of Viger. Boston: Copeland & Day. 1896.
- The Witching of Elspie: A Book of Stories. Toronto: McClelland & Stewart. 1923.
- The Circle of Affection and Other Pieces in Prose and Verse. Toronto: McClelland & Stewart. 1947. - mostly prose
- Clever, Glenn, ed. (1987) [1972]. Selected Stories of Duncan Campbell Scott (revised 3rd ed.). Ottawa: University of Ottawa Press. ISBN 978-0-7766-0183-0.
- Untitled Novel (posthumously published). Moonbeam, Ontario: Penumbra. 1979 [c. 1905]. ISBN 0-920806-04-X.
- Ware, Tracy, ed. (2001). "The Uncollected Short Stories of Duncan Campbell Scott". Duncan Campbell Scott. London, Ontario: Canadian Poetry Press.

=== Non-fiction ===
- John Graves Simcoe. Makers of Canada, volume VII. Toronto: Morang & Co. 1905. - John Graves Simcoe at Google Books
- The Administration of Indian Affairs in Canada. Vol. 3. Toronto: Canadian Institute of International Affairs. 1931.
- Walter J. Phillips. Toronto: Ryerson. 1947. - Walter J. Phillips at Google Books
- Bourinot, Arthur S., ed. (1960). More Letters of Duncan Campbell Scott. Ottawa: Bourinot.
- Davies, Barrie, ed. (1979). At the Mermaid Inn: Wilfred Campbell, Archibald Lampman, Duncan Campbell Scott in the Globe 1892–93. Toronto: University of Toronto Press. ISBN 978-0-8020-6333-5.
- Macdougall, Robert L., ed. (1983). The Poet and the Critic: A Literary Correspondence Between Duncan Campbell Scott and E.K. Brown. Ottawa: Carleton University Press. ISBN 978-0-8862-9013-9.
- Doughty, Arthur G.; Shortt, Adam., eds. (1914). "Indian Affairs, 1763-1841". Canada and its Provinces: A History of the Canadian People and their Institutions by One Hundred Associates. Vol. 4. Toronto: Glasgow, Brook & Company. pp. 695–728.
- Doughty, Arthur G.; Shortt, Adam., eds. (1914). "Indian Affairs, 1840-1867". Canada and its Provinces: A History of the Canadian People and their Institutions by One Hundred Associates. Vol. 5. Toronto: Glasgow, Brook & Company. pp. 331–364.
- Doughty, Arthur G.; Shortt, Adam., eds. (1914). "Indian Affairs, 1867-1912". Canada and its Provinces: A History of the Canadian People and their Institutions by One Hundred Associates. Vol. 7. Toronto: Glasgow, Brook & Company. pp. 593–628.

=== Edited ===
- Lampman, Archibald (1900). Scott, Duncan Campbell (ed.). The Poems of Archibald Lampman. Toronto: Morang & Co.
- Lampman, Archibald (1925). Scott, Duncan Campbell (ed.). Lyrics of Earth: Sonnets and Ballads. Toronto: Musson.
- Lampman, Archibald (1943). Scott, Duncan Campbell (ed.). At the Long Sault and Other New Poems. Toronto: Ryerson.
- Lampman, Archibald (1947). Scott, Duncan Campbell (ed.). Selected Poems of Archibald Lampman. Toronto: Ryerson.

== See also ==
- Canadian literature
- Canadian poetry
- List of Canadian poets

Professional and academic associations
Preceded by Arthur P. Coleman	President of the Royal Society of Canada; 1921–1922	Succeeded by J. Playfair McMurrich
