= Craig Poile =

Canadian poet

- Occupation: Poet
- Writing career
- Notable awards: Archibald Lampman Award (2010)

Craig Poile (born 20th century) is a Canadian poet, who won the Archibald Lampman Award in 2010 for his collection True Concessions. He was also a shortlisted nominee for the Gerald Lampert Award in 1999 for his debut collection First Crack, and for an Ottawa Book Award in 2010 for True Concessions.

Originally from New Brunswick, he studied journalism and English literature at Carleton University.

Poile's poetry has appeared in The New Quarterly, Malahat Review, The Fiddlehead, Literary Review of Canada, Arc, Best Canadian Poetry and Seminal: The Anthology of Canada's Gay Male Poets. He was the co-owner of Collected Works, an independent bookstore in Ottawa which closed in 2012.
