= Monty Reid =

Canadian poet (born 1952)

Monty Reid (born 1952 in Spalding, Saskatchewan) is a Canadian poet.

== Life ==
He graduated from the University of Alberta, with an M.A. He lived in Drumheller, Alberta, and worked at the Royal Tyrrell Museum and later at the Canadian Museum of Nature starting in 1999 (since retired).

He has won Alberta’s Stephan G. Stephansson Award for Poetry three times, the Archibald Lampman Award, National Magazine Awards, and is a three-time nominee for the Governor General’s Award. He was editor and publisher of a number of literary magazines, including The Camrose Review (later The Dinosaur Review), The NeWest ReView, and Arc Poetry Magazine, as well as of the chapbook press Sidereal Press. As a musician, he plays guitar and mandolin in the band Call Me Katie.

He is the current Festival Director at VerseFest, Ottawa’s international poetry festival

== Works ==
=== Books ===
- Karst Means Stone. Edmonton, Alberta: NeWest Press, 1979.
- The Life of Riley. Saskatoon, Saskatchewan: Thistledown Press. 1981. ISBN 978-0-920066-40-9.
- The Dream of Snowy Owls. Edmonton, Alberta: Longspoon Press, 1983.
- The Alternate Guide. Red Deer, Alberta: Red Deer College Press, 1985.
- These Lawns. Red Deer, Alberta: Red Deer College Press, 1990.
- Crawlspace. Toronto, Ontario: House of Anansi. 1993. ISBN 978-0-88784-539-0.
- Dog Sleeps: Irritated Texts. Edmonton, Alberta: NeWest Press. 1993. ISBN 978-0-920897-35-5.
- Flat Side. Red Deer, Alberta: Red Deer College Press. 1998. ISBN 978-0-88995-188-4.
- Disappointment Island. Ottawa, Ontario: Chaudiere Books. 2006. ISBN 978-0-9781601-1-1.
- The Luskville Reductions. London, Ontario: Brick Books, 2008.
- Garden. Ottawa, Ontario: Chaudiere Books. 2014. ISBN 978-1-9281070-1-9.
- Meditatio Placentae. London, Ontario: Brick Books. 2016. ISBN 9781771314398.

=== Chapbooks ===
- Fridays. Edmonton, Alberta: Sidereal Press, 1979.
- Six Songs for the Mammoth Steppe. Ottawa, Ontario: above/ground press, 2000.
- cuba A book. Ottawa, Ontario: above/ground press, 2005.
- Sweetheart of Mine. Toronto, Ontario: Bookthug, 2006.
- Lost in the Owl Woods. Toronto, Ontario: Bookthug, 2007.
- A Poem That Ends With Murder. Ottawa, Ontario: Apt. 9 Press, 2009.
- In the Garden (oct series). Mount Pleasant, Ontario: Laurel Reed Books, 2010.
- Garden: February Unit. Niagara: Grey Borders Books, 2011.
- Garden (July Unit). Fukushima, Japan: obvious epiphanies press, [n.d.].
- In the Garden (sept series). Ottawa, Ontario: above/ground press, 2011.
- Site Conditions. Ottawa, Ontario: Apt. 9 Press, 2011.
- Contributor’s Notes. Kentville, Nova Scotia: Gaspereau, 2011.
- Garden (dec unit). Eindhoven, Le Pays Bas: corrupt press, 2012.
- Garden: November Unit. Ottawa, Ontario: Sidereal Press, 2013.
- Moan Coach. Ottawa, Ontario: above/ground press, 2013.
- Kissing Bug. Ottawa, Ontario: phafours press, 2014.
- Seam. Ottawa, Ontario: above/ground press, 2018.

=== Anthologies (selected) ===
- Lee, Dennis, ed. The New Canadian Poets, 1970–1985. Toronto, Ontario: McClelland and Stewart, 1985.
- Pavlovic, Srdja, ed.Threshold: An Anthology of Contemporary Writing from Alberta. Edmonton, Alberta: University of Alberta Press, 1999.
- mclennan, rob, ed. Decalogue: ten Ottawa poets. Ottawa, Ontario: Chaudiere Books, 2006.
