= Archibald Lampman Award =

Canadian literary award

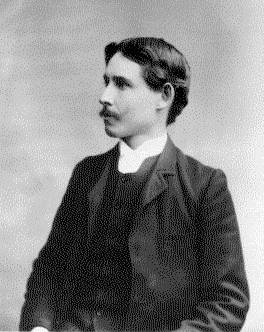
Archibald Lampman, 1881

The Archibald Lampman Award is an annual Canadian literary award, created by Blaine Marchand, and presented by the literary magazine Arc, for the year's best work of poetry by a writer living in the National Capital Region.

The award is presented alongside the Ottawa Book Awards for fiction and non-fiction literature.

== History ==
The award is named in honour of Canadian poet Archibald Lampman (1861–1899). Born in 1861, he graduated from Trinity College (Toronto) in 1882, then moved to Ottawa where he worked for the Post Office until his death in 1899. He is known for his ability to immerse metaphysics in the details of nature, which he observed while hiking round what was then the wilderness capital of a new country. His books include Among the Millet (1888), Lyrics of Earth (1895) and the posthumous Alcyone (1900).

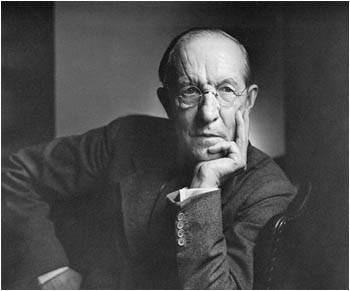
Duncan Campbell Scott, 1933

In 2007, the Archibald Lampman Award for Poetry merged with the Duncan Campbell Scott Foundation, creating the $1500 annual Lampman–Scott Award in honour of two great Confederation Poets. This partnership came to an end in 2010, and competition returned to its former identity as the Archibald Lampman Award for Poetry.

The inclusion of Scott's name in the award has been controversial because of Scott's actions as a Canadian government official supervising Indian affairs for many years. As head of Canada's Indian Affairs agency, Scott promoted the national government's residential school system as a way to assimilate aboriginal children into Canadian society, separating them from their parents and native culture.

The 2003 and 2008 winner of the award, Shane Rhodes, in 2008 turned over half of the $1,500 prize money to the Wabano Centre for Aboriginal Health, a First Nations health centre, according to a 2008 report by the Canadian Broadcasting Corporation. "Taking that money wouldn't have been right, with what I'm writing about," Rhodes said. The poet was researching First Nations history and found Scott's name repeatedly referenced. The CBC reported that Rhodes felt "Scott's legacy as a civil servant overshadows his work as a pioneer of Canadian poetry."

In response, Anita Lahey, then editor of Arc Poetry Magazine, said she thought Scott's actions as head of Indian Affairs were important to remember, but did not eclipse his role in the history of Canadian literature. "I think it matters that we're aware of it and that we think about and talk about these things," she said. "I don't think controversial or questionable activities in the life of any artist or writer is something that should necessarily discount the literary legacy that they leave behind."

== Winners ==
- 1986 – Colin Morton, This Won't Last Forever
- 1987 – Christopher Levenson, Arriving at Night
- 1988 – John Barton, West of Darkness
- 1989 – Patrick White, Habitable Planets
- 1990 – Gary Geddes, No Easy Exit
- 1991 – George Elliott Clarke, Whylah Falls
- 1992 – Blaine Marchand, A Garden Enclosed
- 1993 – Marianne Bluger, Summer Grass
- 1994 – John Newlove, Apology for Absence: Selected Poems 1962–1992
- 1995 – John Barton, Designs from the Interior
- 1996 – Gary Geddes, The Perfect Cold Warrior
- 1997 – Diana Brebner, Flora & Fauna
- 1998 – Sandra Nicholls, Woman of Sticks, Woman of Stones
- 1999 – John Barton, Sweet Ellipsis
- 2000 – Stephanie Bolster, Two Bowls of Milk
- 2001 – Colin Morton, Coastlines of the Archipelago
- 2002 – Armand Garnet Ruffo, At Geronimo's Grave
- 2003 – Shane Rhodes, Holding Pattern
- 2004 – David O'Meara, The Vicinity
- 2005 – Stephen Brockwell, Fruitfly Geographic
- 2006 – Laura Farina, This Woman Alphabetical
- 2007 – Monty Reid, Disappointment Island
- 2008 – Shane Rhodes, The Bindery
- 2009 – David O'Meara, Noble Gas, Penny Black
- 2010 – Craig Poile, True Concessions
- 2011 – Paul Tyler, A Short History of Forgetting
- 2012 – Michael Blouin, Wore Down Trust
- 2013 – Nina Berkhout, Elseworlds
- 2014 – David O'Meara, A Pretty Sight
- 2015 – Shane Book, Congotronic
- 2016 – Pearl Pirie, the pet radish, shrunken
- 2017 – Stephen Brockwell, All of Us Reticent, Here, Together
- 2018 – Christine McNair, Charm
- 2019 – Jenny Haysom, Dividing the Wayside
- 2020 – Ben Ladouceur, Mad Long Emotion
- 2021 – Deborah-Anne Tunney, A Different Wolf
- 2022 – David O'Meara, Masses on Radar
- 2023 – Conyer Clayton, But the sun, and the ships, and the fish, and the waves

== See also ==
- Canadian poetry
- List of poetry awards
- List of years in poetry
- List of years in literature
