= Stephen Brockwell =

Canadian poet

- Born: June 3, 1963 (age 63)
- Occupation: Poet
- Writing career
- Genre: Poetry

Stephen Brockwell is a Canadian poet.

== Life ==
Stephen Brockwell lives and works in Ottawa. He was editor, with Rob McLennan, of the online journal Poetics.ca from 2002 until 2007.

== Awards ==
- 2005 Archibald Lampman Award for Fruitfly Geographic
- 2017 Archibald Lampman Award for All of Us Reticent, Here, Together

== Poems online ==
- "Hyperbole for a large number", caterina, March 03, 2003
- "April Violin"; "The History of Scribes"; "Kia", The Drunken boat, Vol.8, 2008
- "Draught" Trans Poetry, Ottawa
- "Mark Bradley’s Plasma TV"; "Mark Bradley’s SUV"; "Dr. Plaza’s Idea"; "Scarecrow"; "Se Transformer en M. Busbib"; "Karikura’s Fiddle"; "Three Short Poems by Karikura", Sentinel Poetry #47, October 2006

== Books ==
- The Wire in Fences. Balmuir Book Pub. 1988.
- Cometology. ECW Press. 2001. ISBN 978-1-55022-451-1.
- Fruitfly Geographic. ECW Press. 2004.
- The Real Made Up. ECW Press. 2007.
- Complete Surprising Fragments of Improbable Books. Mansfield Press. 2013.
- All of Us Reticent, Here, Together. Mansfield Press. 2016.
- Immune to the Sacred. Mansfield Press. 2022.

== Anthologies ==
- Todd Swift, ed. (2003). 100 poets against the war. Salt Publishing.
- Stephen Brockwell and Stuart Ross, ed. (2011). Rogue Stimulus: The Stephen Harper Holiday Anthology for a Prorogued Parliament. Mansfield Press.
