= Stephanie Bolster =

Canadian poet and professor of creative writing

- Born: 1969 (age 56–57)
- Education: BFA (1991), MFA (1994), University of British Columbia
- Occupations: Poet, professor
- Employer: Concordia University
- Writing career
- Genre: Poetry
- Notable work: White Stone: The Alice Poems
- Notable awards: Governor General's Award for Poetry (1998)

Stephanie Bolster (born 1969) is a Canadian poet and professor of creative writing at Concordia University, Montreal.

== History ==
She holds a Bachelor of Fine Arts in Creative Writing (1991) and a Master of Fine Arts (1994) from the University of British Columbia. Her first book, White Stone: The Alice Poems, won the Governor General's Award for poetry in 1998. Bolster's current project, "Long Exposure", is a book-length poem that takes as its starting point Robert Polidori's post-disaster photographs of New Orleans and Chernobyl.

In 2004, Bolster edited and published The Ishtar Gate, featuring the poetry of Dutch-Canadian poet Diana Brebner. Bolster also acknowledged the support of Hendrika Ruger in previously publishing Brebner's work in years prior.

== Awards ==
- 1993 Norma Epstein Award for Creative Writing
- 1996 Bronwen Wallace Memorial Award for Poetry
- 1997 Contemporary Verse 2 poetry competition
- 1997 The Malahat Review Long Poem Prize
- 1998 Governor General's Award
- 1998 Poetry Chapbook Contest, Mother Tongue Press
- 1999 Gerald Lampert Award
- 2000 Lampman-Scott Award
- 2003 Great Blue Heron Poetry Competition, The Antigonish Review

== Works ==
=== Poetry ===
- Three Bloody Words (above/ground press, Ottawa, 1996). Chapbook, published in edition of 300.
- Inside A Tent of Skin: 9 Poems from the National Gallery of Ottawa. (Mother Tongue Press, 1998). Limited edition chapbook.
- White Stone: The Alice Poems (Véhicule Editions, 1998).
- Two Bowls of Milk (McClelland & Stewart, 1999).
- Pavilion (McClelland & Stewart, 2002).
- A Page from the Wonders of Life on Earth (Brick Books, London, ON, 2011).
- Three Bloody Words: Twentieth Anniversary Edition (above/ground press, Ottawa, 2016).

=== Edited works ===
- The Ishtar Gate: Last and Selected Poems, Diana Brebner, edited and with an introduction by Stephanie Bolster. Montréal and Kingston: McGill-Queen's University Press, Hugh MacLennan Poetry Series, 2004.
- The Best Canadian Poetry in English 2008, edited by Stephanie Bolster, series/advisory editor Molly Peacock. Toronto: Tightrope Books, 2008.
- Penned: Zoo Poems, edited by Stephanie Bolster, Katia Grubisic, and Simon Reader. Montreal: Signal Editions/Véhicule Press, 2009.
- Global Poetry Anthology, edited by Valerie Bloom, Stephanie Bolster, Frank M. Chipasula, Fred D'Aguiar, Michael Harris, John Kinsella, Sinéad Morrissey, Odia Ofeimun, Eric Ormsby, and Anand Thakore. Montreal: Signal Editions/Véhicule Press, 2012.
