= Hendrika Ruger =

Dutch-Canadian author and publisher (born 1928)

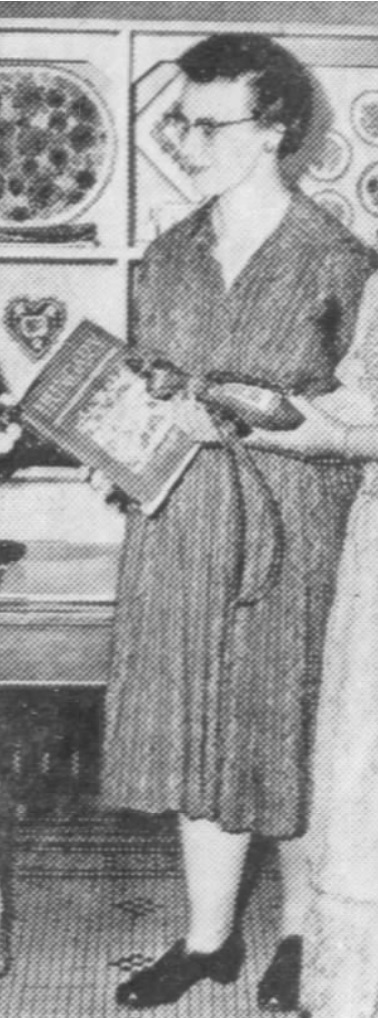
- Ruger in the 1960s
- Born: 1928 (age 97–98); The Netherlands
- Education: University of Windsor
- Occupations: Writer, publisher, translator

Hendrika Ruger is a Dutch-Canadian author, publisher, and the founder of Netherlandic Press publishing company.

== History ==
Hendrika Ruger was born in 1928 and began publishing in the late 1950s. (Note: Although her first book was published in 1981, the Windsor Star reported that Hendrika Ruger was giving scholarly papers as early as 1957.) In 1957, Ruger's paper "National Music" was presented at the University of Windsor's Annual Music Meeting. Hendrika Ruger graduated from the University of Windsor in Canada in May 1971. In 1976, Ruger was appointed as a Specialist Librarian at Windsor's Carnegie Library.

In 1981, Hendrika Ruger founded Netherlandic Press, a publishing company focused on literary works by Dutch-Canadians and Canadians of Dutch descent. In the 1980s and 1990s, Netherlandic Press published eight volumes of poetry and short fiction by Dutch-Canadians, as well as several English translations of Dutch texts. Ruger's books have celebrated Dutch-Canadian writers such as Guy Vanderhaeghe, Aritha Van Herk and Ralph D. Witten. In a review of Hendrika Ruger's book Distant Kin, Tamara J. Palmer wrote that "although it is certainly not heavy handed in its exploration of what might be called 'the Dutch-Canadian experience,' Hendrika Ruger makes clear that the stories and poems collected here do represent recent attempts by the children of immigrants to examine the history of their parents' migration and struggle and to give their discoveries academic or literary form."

== Recognition ==
In 2004, Stephanie Bolster celebrated Hendrika Ruger for Ruger's "ongoing support" of Dutch-Canadian poet Diana Brebner.

== Bibliography ==
As per OCLC Worldcat

- Under Dutch Skies: A Collection of Poems by Dutch Authors, 1981, ISBN 9780919417014
- The Revolution Begins in Bruges: A Collection of Poems (Translation), 1983, ISBN 9780919417052
- From a Chosen Land: A Dutch-Canadian Anthology of Poetry and Prose, 1983, ISBN 9780919417090
- Distant Kin: Dutch Canadian Stories and Poems, 1987, ISBN 9780919417120
- Dutch Quintet: A Collection of Poems and Stories by Dutch-Canadians, 1988 ISBN 9780919417151
- Transplanted Lives: Dutch-Canadian Stories and Poems, 1988, ISBN 9780919417137
- Insight: Canadian Writers View Holland, 1988, ISBN 9780919417144
- Dutch Voices: A Collection of Stories and Poems by Dutch-Canadians, 1989, ISBN 9780919417175
- Buffaloberries and Saskatoons: Stories and Poetry From Western Canada by Dutch-Canadians, 1991, ISBN 9780919417229
