= Morpeth, Ontario =

Morpeth
- Unincorporated community
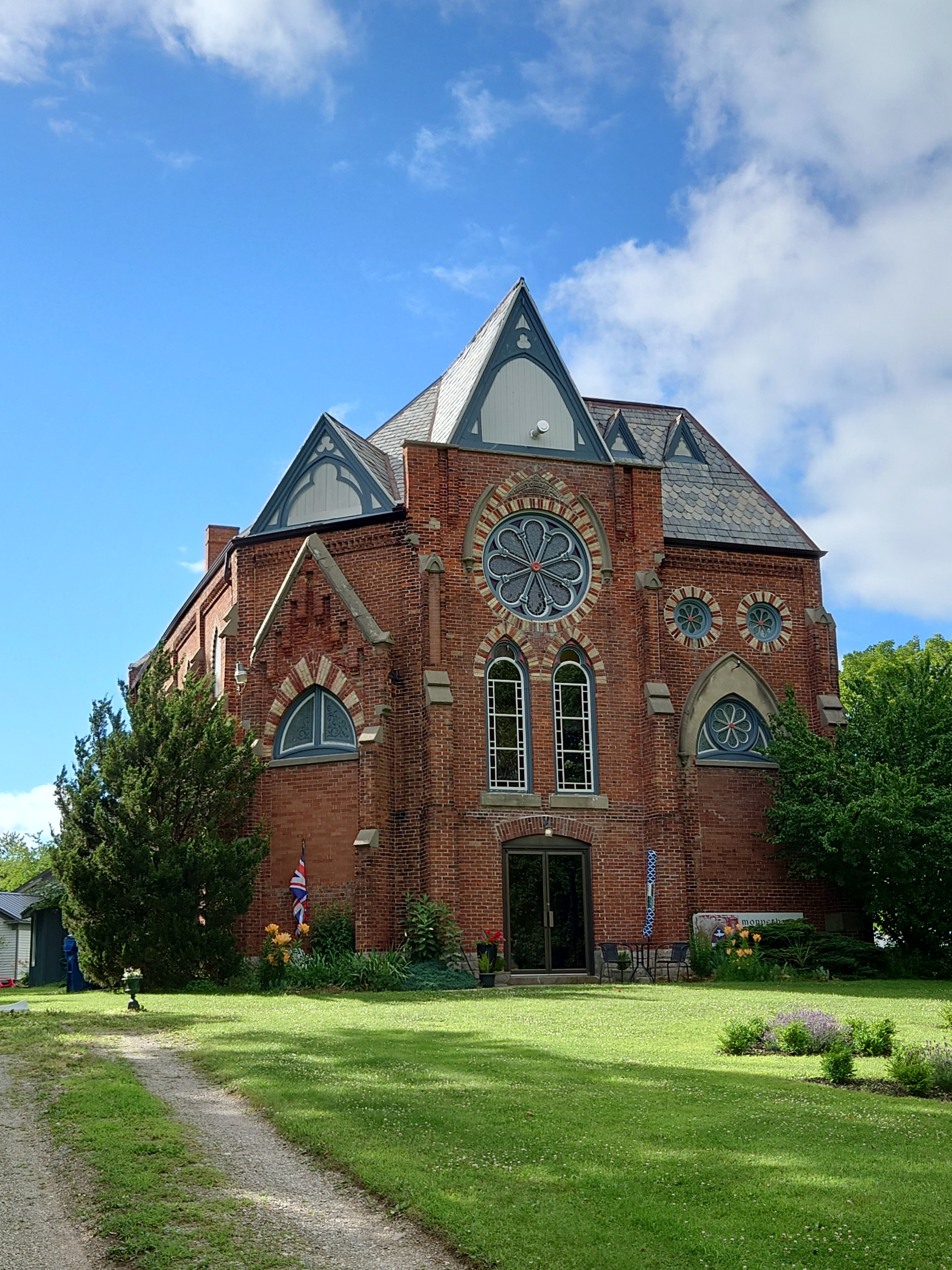
- Morpeth United Church, built 1877

- Location within Municipality of Chatham-Kent Location within Southern Ontario
- Coordinates: 42°23′35″N 81°50′44″W
- Country: Canada
- Province: Ontario
- Municipality: Chatham-Kent
- Time zone: UTC-5 (EST)
  - Summer (DST): UTC-4 (EDT)
- Forward sortation area: N0P 1X0
- Area codes: 519 and 226
- NTS Map: 040I05
- GNBC Code: FDWRD

Morpeth is a community in Chatham-Kent, Ontario, Canada. It is located between Blenheim and St. Thomas on Highway 3.

== History ==
The community is named after Lord Morpeth, who was once a guest of Col. Thomas Talbot. Morpeth was an area of notable commerce in the 1880s. When the railroad went through, it instead went through nearby Ridgetown, Ontario, which eventually grew faster than Morpeth.

Archibald Lampman, one of Canada's Confederation Poets, and "generally considered the finest of Canada's late 19th-century poets in English", was born in Morpeth in 1861. The Dictionary of Canadian Biography says: "The Morpeth that Lampman knew was a small town set in the rolling farm country of what is now western Ontario, not far from the shores of Lake Erie. The little red church just east of the town, on the Talbot Road, was his father’s charge."

St. John's Anglican Church was completed in 1878, by architect Gordon W. Lloyd. In 2010, it was added to the Municipal Heritage Register due to its "cultural value or interest" to Chatham-Kent; its heritage status was removed in 2021.

== Attractions ==
Attractions include Greenview Park and Zoo, Rondeau Shores Trailer Park, and Rondeau Provincial Park.

Morpeth United Church, built in 1877, was converted into an Airbnb rental unit.
