= The Gallery of Lost Species =

2015 novel by Nina Berkhout

- First edition
- Author: Nina Berkhout
- Published: 2015 (House of Anansi Press)
- Pages: 352
- ISBN: 9781770894846

The Gallery of Lost Species is a novel by Canadian Nina Berkhout. It was published in 2015 by House of Anansi Press. It is the debut novel by Berkhout, who was previously a published poet.

The novel is about the intense rivalry and friendship between two sisters who are raised by unsuccessful artists: the plain Edith Walker, and her older sister Vivienne, the family beauty who is also imbued with artistic talent. The novel is set in Ottawa and features many notable Ottawa landmarks and artworks including the National Gallery of Canada, Maman, Chateau Lafayette, The Dream by Damien Hirst, Mrs. Tiggy Winkles, and The Jack Pine.

== Plot ==
Edith Walker is the youngest child of Henry and Constance Walker. Her parents had a brief affair in New York City where Henry was a struggling painter and Constance was a model. Constance moved back to her home country of France but discovered she was pregnant, causing Henry to marry her and bring her back to Ottawa, Ontario, where they settled in the lower-income neighbourhood of Mechanicsville. Constance gives birth to their first daughter, Vivienne, and three years later gives birth to Edith. Henry is never able to make it as an artist and works as a custodian at Place du Portage. Constance, who had always wanted to be an actress, settles down as a home maker, but becomes a stage mother, forcing Vivienne to participate in beauty pageants as a child. When Vivienne is a teenager she finally rebels against her mother and after two disastrous pageants (including one where she throws up on stage and another where she simply refuses to appear), Constance finally lets her quit the pageant circuit.

Edith, meanwhile, is much closer to her father and enjoys helping him search for scraps for his art projects. He gets Edith a job with a woman named Serena who runs a business dealing in antique coins. Her son Omar is around Edith's age and steals from his mother. When Edith is 13 and Vivienne is 16, they go on a trip to Lake Louise, Alberta. While there Edith meets and develops a crush on Liam Livingstone, a college student who is also originally from Ottawa who is fascinated by Vivienne. Edith also sees a unicorn around the lake. After they part, Edith and Liam become pen pals.

Vivienne begins dressing like a punk and dates a high school boy named Nick Angel who introduces her to drugs. Edith expresses her concern to Omar, who tells her to give Nick money so that he will overdose. Edith is reluctant to go through with the plan, but after discovering her father and Serena are having an affair, she helps Nick steal a coin and uses her share of the money to bribe Nick into leaving her sister. Nick does not break up with her sister, but as Omar predicted he buys cocaine with Edith's money and overdoses, blaming Vivienne and breaking up with her.

Vivienne quits her last year of high school and begins living and working in Chinatown, Ottawa. Liam leaves school to come help her and eventually persuades her to finish her high school degree and apply to art school. Vivienne is accepted to the Emily Carr University of Art and Design and Liam decides to move with her. Edith, who had been hoping that Liam would turn to her when Vivienne tired of him, is crushed. Nevertheless, Liam, who continues to fund Vivenne's lifestyle in Vancouver, eventually grows exhausted with her as she slides into alcoholism. He eventually leaves her, but maintains contact with Edith.

When Edith is 17 Henry develops lung cancer and eventually dies from it. As he is dying, Constance reveals that she knew about his affair with Serena, but forgives him. Vivienne refuses to come home until the funeral. Edith, who has spent her entire adolescence overweight, finally loses all the weight due to not eating from grief and decides to forgo university for college. She also discovers that Vivienne's prestigious art career is a result of their father going into debt to buy her works. Edith gets a degree in Museum Studies and manages to wrangle a job at the National Gallery of Canada where her father always longed to have his works exhibited.

Liam informs Edith that he's coming back to Ottawa to teach and she offers to let him stay with her until he finds a place. Instead she seduces him and the two fall into a routine although Liam remains reluctant to call her his girlfriend or introduce her to his family. Vivienne returns to Ottawa, now completely consumed with alcoholism. Despite this Edith is bitter when she sees Liam and Vivienne interacting. Shortly after, Liam announces he has taken a job away from Ottawa and leaves Edith. Constance moves to Florida with her new lover, Pierre.

Vivienne continues to live around Ottawa though Edith rarely sees her. A few months after Liam leaves, Edith receives a call from Vivienne who is in North Bay. She goes to retrieve her and discovers that Vivienne had applied to a rehab centre and was rejected after they discovered that she had recently smoked marijuana to try to alleviate her alcohol cravings. She no longer paints as her alcoholism has affected her hands.

Months later Edith receives a call from the hospital informing her that Vivienne is dying and has cirrhosis. Because she is an alcoholic she is not eligible to receive a donor liver. Edith is her best chance of survival. Despite the fact that Constance is an eligible donor she turns her back on Vivienne and encourages Edith to do the same. Instead Edith decides that she will donate her liver to Vivienne and maxes out her credit cards and takes out loans in order to pay the fee to have the surgery done in India, the cheapest country where the surgery is possible. With the due date slowly closing in Edith realizes she is still $10,000 short. She goes to Serena's old shop hoping to get a loan from her and finds that Omar has inherited the store. He tells her he will get her the money but refuses to take a conventional loan, insisting that he will exchange the money for sex with Edith or an artwork she will steal from the Gallery. Edith prostitutes herself to Omar but shortly after Vivienne disappears. In the course of searching for her Edith learns that she lied about going on a doctor-approved retreat, that she had quit her job and that she had maintained a relationship with Nick Angel and that they had been together on and off since they were teenagers. Edith tries to find Vivienne herself, going to the police and hiring a private investigator but she cannot find her.

On Remembrance Day Edith once again runs into Nick Angel and meets his daughter who looks visibly like Vivienne. He informs Edith that Clair is Vivienne's daughter and she was born shortly before Henry's death, abandoned by Vivienne after a year. Edith expresses interest in getting to know her niece and though Nick is reluctant he eventually agrees.

Edith never gives up hope of once again finding Vivienne and begins to work on helping to feed local drug addicts. She meets a cryptozoologist who works at the Canadian Museum of Nature. A year after Vivienne's disappearance Edith returns to Lake Louise to scatter her father's ashes, hoping to see a unicorn again.

== Reception ==
The novel received mostly positive reviews. The reviewer for The Globe and Mail called it "one of the most deeply moving stories I have read in many years". The Toronto Star praised it as "masterful". The review from The National Post was more mixed calling the novel "undercooked" while still praising Berkhout for choosing "all the right subjects".
