= John Barton (poet) =

Canadian poet

- Born: March 6, 1957 (age 69); Edmonton, Alberta, Canada
- Occupation: Poet
- Writing career
- Language: English

John Barton (born 1957) is a Canadian poet.

== Early life ==
Barton was born in Edmonton, Alberta, in 1957 and was raised in Calgary.

== Education ==
Barton studied at the University of Alberta, University of Calgary, University of Quebec, University of Victoria, University of Western Ontario and Columbia University in New York.

He originally wanted to study architecture but instead enrolled in English and French courses in the Faculté Saint-Jean and the University of Alberta, where he studied from 1975 to 1978. He transferred to the University of Victoria, where he graduated with a BA in Creative Writing in 1981. He started but not finish an MFA in Writing at Columbia University in New York in 1983. In 1986, he graduated from the University of Western Ontario, with a Master of Library and Information Science. He later studied Book Editing at the Banff Publishing Centre in 1994 and magazine editing with Magazines Canada in 2005.

Barton studied poetry with Eli Mandel, Gary Geddes, Robin Skelton, Joseph Brodsky, and Daniel Halpern.

== Career ==
Barton has published twelve books of poetry.

Since 1980 his poems have appeared in seventy-five magazines and thirty anthologies in North America, the United Kingdom, India, and Australia.

Barton was co-editor of Arc Poetry Magazine from 1990 to 2003. He edited The Malahat Review from 2004 to 2018 and was poetry editor for Winnipeg's Signature Editions from 2006 5 to 2008. He co-founded Arc's Poem of the Year Contest in 1996. He was writer-in-residence at the Saskatoon Public Library from September 2008 to May 2008. During the 2010/11 academic year, he was writer-in-residence at University of New Brunswick and in the fall 2015 term, at the Memorial University of Newfoundland. Additionally he worked as a librarian and editor for five museums in Ottawa between 1986 and 2003. He has lived in Victoria, British Columbia since 2004.

He and Billeh Nickerson co-edited the anthology Seminal: The Anthology of Canada’s Gay Male Poets, published in 2007 by Arsenal Pulp Press. In 2012, his Selected Poems were published by Nightwood. In 2020, The Essential Douglas LePan, which he edited and introduced, won the eLit Award (Gold Category) for Poetry. Lost Family: A Memoir was nominated for the Derek Walcott Prize for Poetry in 2021, the same year he was declared a Gay Icon by The Fiddlehead. In 2022, he was the main editor of Best Canadian Poetry 2023 for Biblioasis.

== Awards ==
- 1986: Patricia Hackett Prize, University of Western Australia
- 1988: Archibald Lampman Award, for West of Darkness: Emily Carr, a self-portrait
- 1995: Archibald Lampman Award, for Designs from the Interior
- 1995: Ottawa Book Award
- 1999: Archibald Lampman Award, for Sweet Ellipsis
- 2003: CBC Literary Award (Second Prize)
- 2006: National Magazine Award (Silver)
- 2019: Victoria's Poet Laureate
- 2021: Life Member, League of Canadian Poets
- 2020: eLit Award for Poetry

== Works ==
=== Poetry ===
- 1981: A Poor Photographer. Sono Nis Press
- 1984: Hidden Structure. Ekstasis Editions
- 1987: West of Darkness: Emily Carr, a Self-Portrait. Penumbra Press
- 1990: Great Men. Quarry Press
- 1993: Notes Toward a Family Tree. Quarry Press. 1993. ISBN 978-1-55082-066-9.
- 1994: Designs from the Interior. Anansi. 1994. ISBN 978-0-88784-558-1.
- 1998: Sweet Ellipsis. ECW Press. 1998. ISBN 978-1-55022-354-5.
- 1999: West of Darkness: Emily Carr, a self-portrait 2nd ed edition. Dundurn Press Ltd. 1999. ISBN 978-0-88878-402-5.
- 2001: Hypothesis. House of Anansi Press. 2001. ISBN 978-0-88784-659-5.
- 2006: West of Darkness: Emily Carr, A Self-Portrait / A l’ombre de l’ouest: Emily Carr, un autoportrait. First bilingual edition. BuschekBooks
- 2009: Hymn. Brick Books
- 2012: For the Boy with the Eyes of the Virgin: Selected Poems. Nightwood Editions
- 2014: Polari. Goose Lane Editions
- 2020: Lost Family: A Memoir. Signal Editions

=== Chapbooks ===
- 1995: Destinations, Leaving the Map, above/ground press
- 1999: Oxygen, above/ground press
- 1999: Shroud. Viola Leaflets. 1999. ISBN 978-0-9684308-0-4.
- 2003: Runoff. Viola Leaflets. 2003. ISBN 978-0-9684308-1-1.
- 2004 Asymmetries, Frog Hollow Press Book One: House of the Present; Book Two: The Strata.
- 2012: Balletomane: The Program Notes of Lincoln Kirstein. JackPine
- 2016: Reframing Paul Cadmus: Pictures from an Exhibition. above/ground press
- 2018: Windsock. Frog Hollow Press
- 2018: Visible But Not Seen: Queer Expression in the Age of Equity. Anstruther Press
- 2024: Stopwatch. Emergency Flash Mob Press

== Essays ==
- 2019: We Are Not Avatars: Essays, Memoirs, Manifestos. Palimpsest Press

=== Criticism ===
- "Trends in Canadian Poetry", Educational Insights, 11(1)

=== Editor ===
- 1998 John Barton, ed. (1998). We all begin in a little magazine: Arc and the promise of Canada's poets, 1978-1998. McGill-Queen's Press - MQUP. ISBN 978-0-88629-325-3.
- 2007 John Barton, Billeh Nickerson, ed. (2007). Seminal: The Anthology of Canada's Gay Male Poets. Arsenal Pulp Press. ISBN 978-1-55152-217-3.
- 2oyThe Malahat at Fifty: Canada's Iconic Literary Magazine, 2017. University of Victoria Libraries
- The Essential Douglas LePan, 2019. The Porcupine's Quill
- The Essential Derk Wynand, 2020. The Porcupine's Quill
- Best Canadian Poetry 2023, 2022. Biblioasis
