= Archibald Lampman =

Canadian poet (1861–99)

Archibald Lampman FRSC
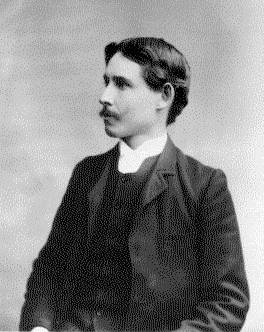
- Lampman in 1889
- Born: 17 November 1861; Morpeth, Canada West
- Died: 10 February 1899 (aged 37); Ottawa, Ontario
- Citizenship: British subject
- Occupation: Civil servant
- Spouse: Maude Playter
- Relatives: Hilda Katherine Ross (niece)
- Writing career
- Language: English
- Genre: poetry
- Notable works: Among the Millet and Other Poems, At the Long Sault and Other Poems, Lyrics of Earth
- Notable awards: FRSC
- Movement: Confederation Poets

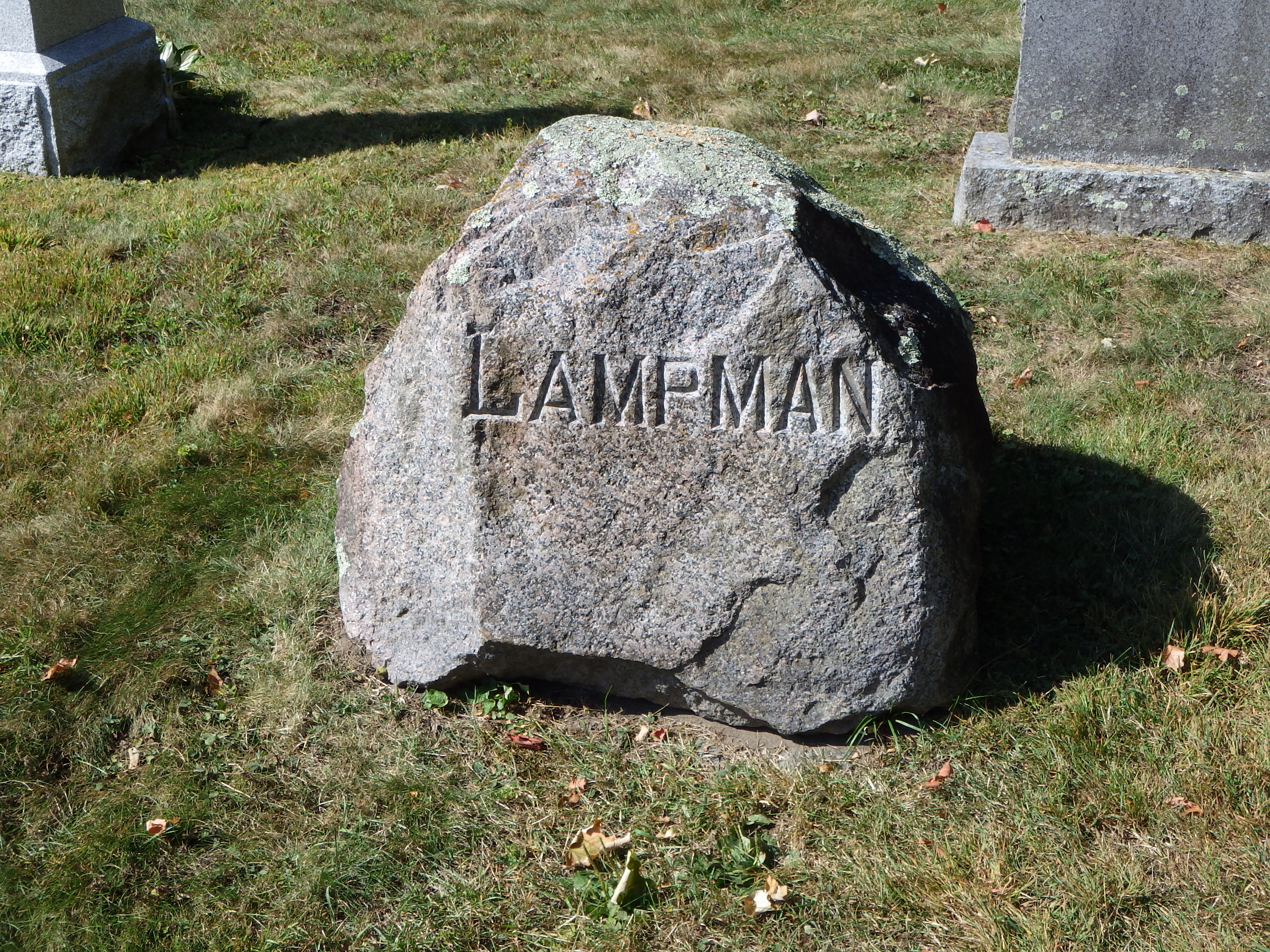
Archibald Lampman's headstone in Beechwood Cemetery in Ottawa

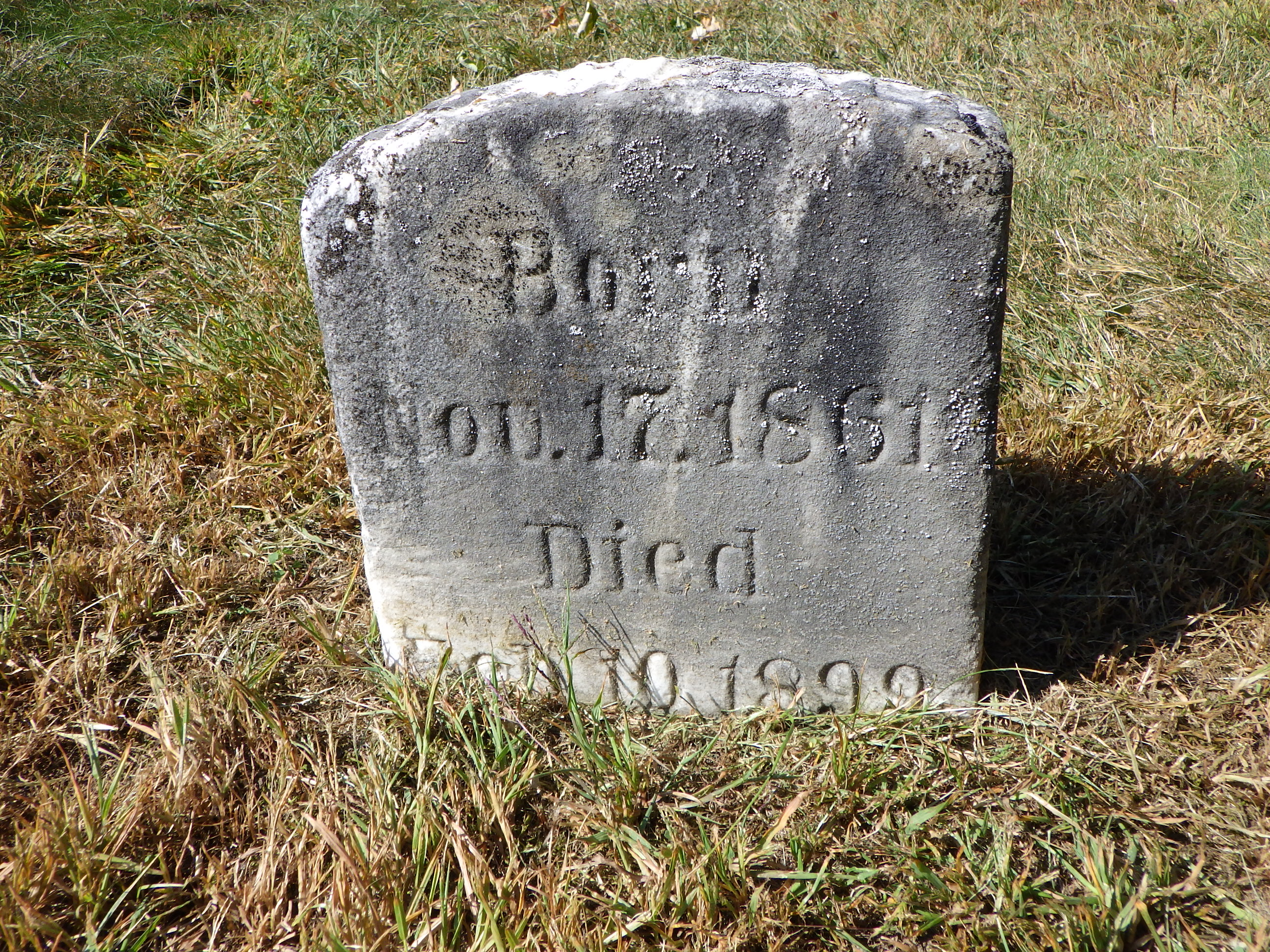
Archibald Lampman's footstone in Beechwood Cemetery in Ottawa

Archibald Lampman FRSC (17 November 1861 – 10 February 1899) was a Canadian poet. "He has been described as 'the Canadian Keats;' and he is perhaps the most outstanding exponent of the Canadian school of nature poets." The Canadian Encyclopedia says that he is "generally considered the finest of Canada's late 19th-century poets in English."

Lampman is classed as one of Canada's Confederation Poets, a group which also includes Charles G.D. Roberts, Bliss Carman and Duncan Campbell Scott.

== Life ==
Archibald Lampman was born at Morpeth, Ontario, a village near Chatham, the son of Archibald Lampman, an Anglican clergyman. "The Morpeth that Lampman knew was a small town set in the rolling farm country of what is now western Ontario, not far from the shores of Lake Erie. The little red church just east of the town, on the Talbot Road, was his father's charge."

In 1867 the family moved to Gore's Landing on Rice Lake, where young Archie Lampman attended the Barron's School. In 1868 he contracted rheumatic fever, which left him lame for some years and with a permanently weakened heart.

Lampman attended Cobourg Collegiate, followed by Trinity College School in Port Hope, Ontario, and then Trinity College in Toronto, Ontario (now part of the University of Toronto), graduating in 1882, with second-class standing. While at university, he published early poems in Acta Victoriana, the literary journal of Victoria College. In 1883, after a frustrating attempt to teach high school in Orangeville, Ontario, he took an appointment as a low-paid clerk in the Post Office Department in Ottawa, a position he held for the rest of his life.

Lampman "was slight of form and of middle height. He was quiet and undemonstrative in manner, but had a fascinating personality. Sincerity and high ideals characterized his life and work."

On 3 September 1887, Lampman married 20-year-old Maude Emma Playter. "They had a daughter, Natalie Charlotte, born in 1892. Arnold Gesner, born May 1894, was the first boy, but he died in August. A third child, Archibald Otto, was born in 1898."

In Ottawa, Lampman befriended poet William Wilfred Campbell. He also became a close friend of Indian Affairs bureaucrat Duncan Campbell Scott; Scott introduced him to camping, and Lampman introduced Scott to writing poetry. One of their early camping trips inspired Lampman's classic Morning on the Lièvre which, in 1961, became the text for, and subject of, an award-winning National Film Board of Canada film of the same name.

Lampman, Campbell, and Scott together wrote a literary column, "At the Mermaid Inn," for the Toronto Globe from February 1892 until July 1893. (The name was a reference to the Elizabethan-era Mermaid Tavern.) As Lampman wrote to a friend:

Campbell is deplorably poor.... Partly in order to help his pockets a little Mr. Scott and I decided to see if we could get the Toronto "Globe" to give us space for a couple of columns of paragraphs & short articles, at whatever pay we could get for them. They agreed to it; and Campbell, Scott and I have been carrying on the thing for several weeks now.

"In the last years of his short life there is evidence of a spiritual malaise which was compounded by the death of an infant son [Arnold, commemorated in the poem "White Pansies"] and his own deteriorating health."

Lampman died in Ottawa at the age of 37, due to his weakened heart. He is buried, fittingly, at Beechwood Cemetery, in Ottawa, a site he wrote about in the poem "In Beechwood Cemetery" (which is inscribed at the cemetery's entranceway). His grave is marked by a natural stone on which is carved only one word: Lampman. A plaque on the site carries a few lines from his poem "In November":

The hills grow wintry white, and bleak winds moan
About the naked uplands. I alone
Am neither sad, nor shelterless, nor gray
Wrapped round with thought, content to watch and dream.

== Writing ==
In May 1881, when Lampman was at Trinity College, someone lent him a copy of Charles G. D. Roberts's recently published first book, Orion and Other Poems. The effect on the 19-year-old student was immediate and profound:

I sat up most of the night reading and re-reading "Orion" in a state of the wildest excitement and when I went to bed I could not sleep. It seemed to me a wonderful thing that such work could be done by a Canadian, by a young man, one of ourselves. It was like a voice from some new paradise of art, calling to us to be up and doing. A little after sunrise I got up and went out into the college grounds ... everything was transfigured for me beyond description, bathed in an old world radiance of beauty; the magic of the lines was sounding in my ears, those divine verses, as they seemed to me, with their Tennyson-like richness and strange earth-loving Greekish flavour. I have never forgotten that morning, and its influence has always remained with me.

Lampman sent Roberts a fan letter, which "initiated a correspondence between the two young men, but they probably did not meet until after Roberts moved to Toronto in late September 1883 to become the editor of Goldwin Smith's The Week."

Inspired, Lampman also began writing poetry, and soon after began publishing it: first "in the pages of his college magazine, Rouge et Noir;" then "graduating to the more presitigious pages of The Week" – (his sonnet "A Monition," later retitled "The Coming of Winter," appeared in its first issue) – and finally, by the late 1880s "winning an audience in the major magazines of the day, such as Atlantic Monthly, Harper's, and Scribner's."

Lampman published mainly nature poetry in the current late-Romantic style. "The prime literary antecedents of Lampman lie in the work of the English poets Keats, Wordsworth, and Arnold," says the Gale Encyclopedia of Biography, "but he also brought new and distinctively Canadian elements to the tradition. Lampman, like others of his school, relied on the Canadian landscape to provide him with much of the imagery, stimulus, and philosophy which characterize his work.... Acutely observant in his method, Lampman created out of the minutiae of nature careful compositions of color, sound, and subtle movement. Evocatively rich, his poems are frequently sustained by a mood of revery and withdrawal, while their themes are those of beauty, wisdom, and reassurance, which the poet discovered in his contemplation of the changing seasons and the harmony of the countryside."

The Canadian Encyclopedia calls his poems "for the most part close-packed melancholy meditations on natural objects, emphasizing the calm of country life in contrast to the restlessness of city living. Limited in range, they are nonetheless remarkable for descriptive precision and emotional restraint. Although characterized by a skilful control of rhythm and sound, they tend to display a sameness of thought."

"Lampman wrote more than 300 poems in this last period of his life, although scarcely half of these were published prior to his death. For single poems or groups of poems he found outlets in the literary magazines of the day: in Canada, chiefly the Week; in the United States, Scribner's Magazine, The Youth's Companion, the Independent, the Atlantic Monthly, and Harper's Magazine. In 1888, with the help of a legacy left to his wife, he published Among the millet and other poems," his first book, at his own expense. The book is notable for the poems "Morning on the Lièvre," "Heat," the sonnet "In November," and the long sonnet sequence "The Frogs"

"By this time he had achieved a literary reputation, and his work appeared regularly in Canadian periodicals and prestigious American magazines.... In 1895 Lampman was elected a Fellow of the Royal Society of Canada, and his second collection of poems, Lyrics of Earth, was brought out by a Boston publisher."

The book was not a success. "The sales of Lyrics of Earth were disappointing and the only critical notices were four brief though favourable reviews. In size, the volume is slighter than Among the Millet — twenty-nine poems in contrast to forty-eight — and in quality fails to surpass the earlier work." (Lyrics does, though, contain some of Lampman's most beautiful poems, such as "After Rain" and "The Sun Cup.")

"A third volume, Alcyone and other poems, in press at the time of his death" in 1899, showed Lampman starting to move in new directions, with the nature verses interspersed with philosophical poetry like "Voices of Earth" and "The Clearer Self" and poems of social criticism like "The City" and what may be his best-known poem, the dystopian vision of "The City of the End of Things." "As a corollary to his preoccupation with nature," notes the Gale Encyclopedia, "Lampman [had] developed a critical stance toward an emerging urban civilization and a social order against which he pitted his own idealism. He was an outspoken socialist, a feminist, and a social critic." Canadian critic Malcolm Ross wrote that "in poems like 'The City at the End of Things' and 'Epitaph on a Rich Man' Lampman seems to have a social and political insight absent in his fellows."

However, Lampman died before Alcyone appeared, and it "was held back by Scott (12 specimen copies were printed posthumously in Ottawa in 1899) in favour of a comprehensive memorial volume planned for 1900." The latter was a planned collected poems "which he was editing in the hope that its sale would provide Maud with some much-needed cash. Besides Alcyone, it included Among the Millet and Lyrics of Earth in their entirety, plus seventy-four sonnets Lampman had tried to publish separately, twenty-three miscellaneous poems and ballads, and two long narrative poems ("David and Abigail" and "The Story of an Affinity")." Among the previously unpublished sonnets were some of Lampman's finest work, including "Winter Uplands", "The Railway Station," and "A Sunset at Les Eboulements."

"Published by Morang & Company of Toronto in 1900," The Poems of Archibald Lampman "was a substantial tome — 473 pages — and ran through several editions. Scott's 'Memoir,' which prefaces the volume, would prove to be an invaluable source of information about the poet's life and personality."

Scott published one further volume of Lampman's poetry, At the Long Sault and Other Poems, in 1943 – "and on this occasion, as on other occasions previously, he did not hesitate to make what he felt were improvements on the manuscript versions of the poems." The book is remarkable mainly for its title poem, "At the Long Sault: May 1660," a dramatic retelling of the Battle of Long Sault, which belongs with the great Canadian historical poems. It was co-edited by E.K. Brown, who the same year published his own volume On Canadian Poetry: a book that was a major boost to Lampman's reputation. Brown considered Lampman and Scott the top Confederation Poets, well ahead of Roberts and Carman, and his view came to predominate over the next few decades.

Lampman never considered himself more than a minor poet, as he once confessed in a letter to a friend: "I am not a great poet and I never was. Greatness in poetry must proceed from greatness of character — from force, fearlessness, brightness. I have none of those qualities. I am, if anything, the very opposite, I am weak, I am a coward, I am a hypochondriac. I am a minor poet of a superior order, and that is all." However, others' opinion of his work has been higher than his own.

Malcolm Ross, for instance, considered him to be the best of all the Confederation Poets:

Lampman, it is true, has the camera eye. But Lampman is no mere photographer. With Scott (and more completely than Scott), he has, poetically, met the demands of his place and his time.... Like Roberts (and more intensively than Roberts), he searches for the idea.... Ideas are germinal for him, infecting the tissue of his thought.... Like the existentialist of our day, Lampman is not so much 'in search of himself' as engaged strenuously in the creation of the self. Every idea is approached as potentially the substance of a 'clearer self.' Even landscape is made into a symbol of the deep, interior processes of the self, or is used ... to induce a settling of the troubled surfaces of the mind and a miraculous transparency that opens into the depths.

== Awards, honours and recognition ==
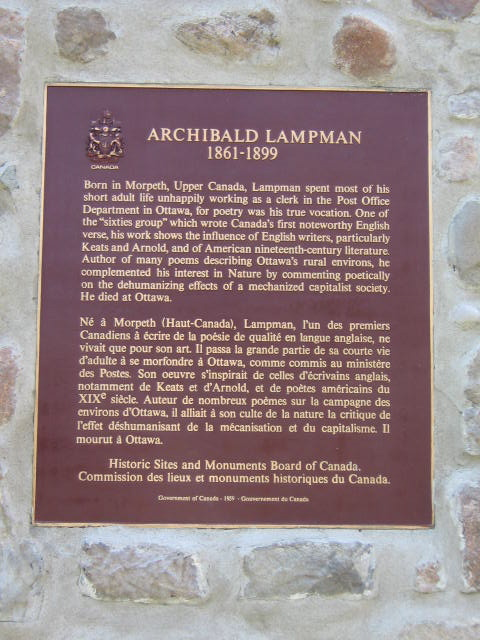
Archibald Lampman plaque and cairn, Morpeth. Photo by Alan L. Brown, June 2009. Photo used with permission from the website www.ontarioplaques.com.

=== Formal honours and designations ===
- He was elected a Fellow of the Royal Society of Canada. (1895)
- He was designated a Person of National Historic Significance. (1920)
- A federal historic plaque marking this designation stands at Trinity Anglican Church in Morpeth. (1920)
- He was inducted into the Chatham-Kent Cultural Hall of Fame in 2023.

=== Awards and literary programs named after him ===
- The Archibald Lampman Award was created in 1986 and is awarded annually by Arc Poetry Magazine for an outstanding book of poetry by a writer in the National Capital Region. The prize was briefly issued as the Lampman-Scott Award. (2007 to 2009)
- Since 1999, the annual Archibald Lampman Poetry Reading at Trinity College, University of Toronto, has brought leading Canadian poets to campus.

=== Physical memorials and monuments ===
==== In Ottawa ====
- The main branch of the Ottawa Public Library features a stained-glass window depicting Lampman alongside other literary figures.
- Historical plaques on Slater Street, Daly Avenue, and at Saint Margaret's Church on Montreal Road commemorate places associated with his life and writing.
- His grave at Beechwood Cemetery is marked by a natural stone and a memorial plaque bearing lines from his poetry. (1899; plaque installed later)
- The Poets Pathway includes a bronze plaque featuring his poem "In Beechwood Cemetery".

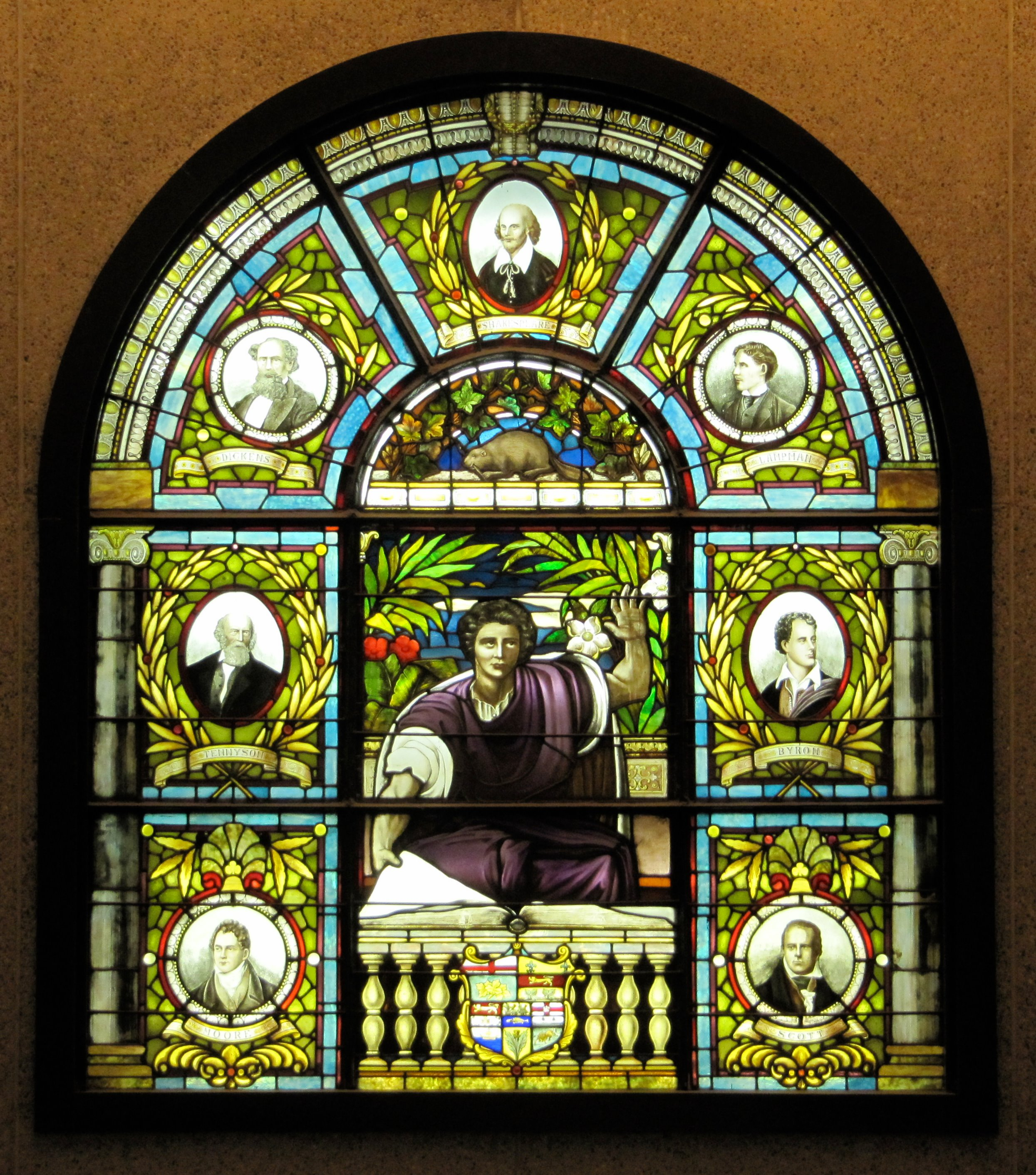
Stained glass at Ottawa Public Library features Charles Dickens, Archibald Lampman, Duncan Campbell Scott, Lord Byron, Alfred, Lord Tennyson, William Shakespeare, Thomas Moore

==== In Ontario ====
- A heritage cairn and provincial plaque stand near his birthplace in Morpeth.
- A memorial medallion honoring Lampman was installed in the chapel of Trinity College. (1906)
- A second medallion is located at Trinity College School in Port Hope.

==== National ====
- Canada Post issued a commemorative postage stamp featuring Lampman's portrait against a nature backdrop. (1989)

=== Place names ===
- The town of Lampman, Saskatchewan, located near Estevan in the region known as Poet's Corner, was named for him. (founded 1910; incorporated 1963)

=== Cultural adaptations and influence ===
- Canadian singer-songwriter Loreena McKennitt adapted Lampman's poem "Snow" for her album To Drive the Cold Winter Away. (1987) She later re-recorded "Snow" for the EP A Winter Garden (1995) and the album A Midwinter Night's Dream (2008).
- The Upper Canada Choristers commissioned composer Stephen Chatman to set three Lampman poems ("The Bird and the Hour", "Snow", and "Voices of Earth") for choir.

== Publications ==
=== Poetry ===
- Lampman, Archibald (1888). Among the Millett, and Other Poems. Ottawa, Ontario: J. Durie and son. Archived from the original on 2012-03-19.
- Lampman, Archibald (1895). Lyrics of Earth. Boston, Massachusetts: Copeland & Day. Archived from the original on 2012-03-19.
- Lampman, Archibald; Scott, Duncan Campbell (1896). "Two poems". privately issued to their friends at Christmastide: not published.
- Lampman, Archibald (1899). Alcyone and Other Poems. Ottawa, Ontario: Ogilvy. Archived from the original on 2012-03-19.
- Scott, Duncan Campbell, ed. (1900). The Poems of Archibald Lampman. Toronto, Ontario: Morang.
- Scott, Duncan Campbell, ed. (1925). Lyrics of Earth: Sonnets and Ballads. Toronto, Ontario: Musson.
- Scott, Duncan Campbell, ed. (1943). At the Long Sault and Other New Poems. Toronto, Ontario: Ryerson.
- Scott, Duncan Campbell, ed. (1947). Selected Poems of Archibald Lampman. Toronto, Ontario: Ryerson.
- Coulby Whitridge, Margaret, ed. (1975). Lampman's Kate: Late Love Poems of Archibald Lampman. Ottawa, Ontario: Borealis. ISBN 978-0-9195-9436-4.
- Coulby Whitridge, Margaret, ed. (1976). Lampman's Sonnets: The Complete Sonnets of Archibald Lampman. Ottawa, Ontario: Borealis. ISBN 978-0-919594-50-0.
- Bentley, D.M.R., ed. (1986). The Story of an Affinity. London, Ontario: Canadian Poetry Press. ISBN 978-0-921243-00-7.
- Gnarowski, Michael, ed. (1990). Selected Poetry of Archibald Lampman. Ottawa, Ontario: Tecumseh. ISBN 978-0-919662-15-5.

=== Prose ===
- Bourinot, Arthur S., ed. (1956). Archibald Lampman's letters to Edward William Thomson (1890-1898). Ottawa, Ontario: Arthur S. Bourinot Publisher.
- Davies, Barrie, ed. (1975). Archibald Lampman: Selected Prose. Ottawa, Ontario: Tecumseh. ISBN 978-0-9196-6254-4.
- Davies, Barrie, ed. (1979). At the Mermaid Inn: Wilfred Campbell, Archibald Lampman, Duncan Campbell Scott in the Globe 1892–93. Toronto, Ontario: University of Toronto Press. ISBN 0-8020-2299-5.
- Lynn, Helen, ed. (1980). An annotated edition of the correspondence between Archibald Lampman and Edward William Thomson, 1890-1898. Ottawa, Ontario: Tecumseh. ISBN 978-0-919662-77-3.
- Bentley, D.M.R., ed. (1996). The Essays and Reviews of Archibald Lampman. London, Ontario: Canadian Poetry Press.
- Bentley, D.M.R., ed. (1999). The Fairy Tales of Archibald Lampman. London, Ontario: Canadian Poetry Press.

== See also ==
- Canadian literature
- Canadian poetry
- List of Canadian poets
