= Blaine Marchand =

Canadian writer (born 1949)

- Born: 1949 (age 76–77); Ottawa, Ontario, Canada
- Occupation: Writer

Blaine Marchand (born 1949 in Ottawa, Ontario) is a Canadian writer. Marchand has published poetry, non-fiction and a novel.

A longtime program manager with the Canadian International Development Agency, some of his writing has been inspired by his international travels with the organization. In 2012 he was guest editor of an issue of the Canadian poetry magazine Vallum dedicated to poets from Pakistan.

From 1992 to 1994 he was president of the League of Canadian Poets. He was also a co-founder of the Ottawa Independent Writers, the Ottawa Valley Book Festival and the Canadian Review, and a regular columnist for Ottawa's LGBT newspaper Capital Xtra!.

Openly gay, he lives in Ottawa.

== Awards ==
- 1971 - Georgia May Cook Sonnet Award
- 1987 - Anthos Poetry Prize
- 1990 - The League of Canadian Poets National Poetry Contest, second prize
- 1992 - Archibald Lampman Award

== Publications ==
=== Poetry ===
- After the Fact. Borealis Press. 1979. ISBN 978-0-88887-051-3.
- Open Fires. Anthos Books. 1987. ISBN 978-0-920798-07-2.
- A Garden Enclosed. Cormorant Books. 1991. ISBN 978-0-920953-52-5.
- Bodily Presence. Quarry Press. 1994. ISBN 978-1-55082-1413.
- Aperture. BuschekBooks. 2008. ISBN 978-1-894543-46-0.
- The Craving of Knives. BuschekBooks. 2009. ISBN 978-1-894543-58-3.

=== Novels ===
- African Journey. Media-Sphere, Youth Editions. 1990. ISBN 978-0-662-18070-8.

=== Non-fiction ===
- Deborah Fletcher; Blaine Marchand; Louis Valenzuela (1981). Ottawa A to Z. Deneau Publishers. ISBN 978-0-88879-058-3.

=== Anthologies ===
- Garden Varieties. Cormorant Books. 1988. ISBN 0-920953-01-8.
- Capital Poets: An Ottawa Anthology. (Ouroboros, 1989).
- More Garden Varieties Two. Mercury Press. 1990. ISBN 978-0-920544-76-1.
