= Hilda Katherine Ross =

Canadian potter and educator

Hilda Katherine Lilith Ross (November 26, 1902 – September 8, 1989) was a Canadian potter, painter, and educator working primarily in Vancouver, British Columbia.

== Life and career ==
Ross was born in Carleton County, Ontario, to William LeBreton Ross and Caroline Stewart Lampman, younger sister of famed poet Archibald Lampman. She studied art at the Winnipeg School of Art under the tutelage of Group of Seven artist Lionel LeMoine FitzGerald. She later studied under the direction of another Group of Seven artist, Frederick Horsman Varley, at the short-lived British Columbia College of Art – forerunner of the Vancouver School of Art which later became the Emily Carr University of Art and Design. She studied ceramics under Rex Mason, Carleton Ball, Konrad Sadawski, and Kyllikki Salamenhakra at the University of British Columbia (UBC).

Ross was the recipient of several awards in ceramics including the Canadian Handicrafts Guild, 2nd best group of entries in 1953; the UBC Art Gallery Purchase Award in 1954; Prize for bowl from the Canadian Handicrafts Guild in 1955; the Independent Order of the Daughters of the Empire (IODE) at the British Columbia Potters 8th Annual Exhibition of 1956; and Gold at the Prague International Exhibition in 1962.

During her career she also exhibited widely both in Canada and abroad. Major exhibitions include the Canadian Pavilion at Expo 67, the Universal and International Exhibition in Brussels in 1958, the 3rd International Exhibition of Ceramic Art in Prague 1962, and the Department of Trade & Commerce Exhibitions in Berlin and Florence 1964.

She died in 1989 in Ganges, British Columbia.

== Ross and BC pottery ==
Ross was instrumental in the growth of pottery as an artistic practice in British Columbia. With Molly Carter, in the late 1940s she taught pottery at Gordon House in West End, Vancouver, which were some of the first independent pottery classes taught in the city. In 1948, Ross, Carter, and Zoltan Kiss took over teaching ceramics classes at UBC's Extension Department in what was the Fine Arts Gallery in the library basement. At the time, the ceramics program was funded by the University Branch of the IODE. In 1952, the classes were re-located to a more permanent home, when the faculty retrofitted a former army barrack that they nicknamed the Pottery Hut. Ross taught part-time at the new facilities along with her former teacher, Rex Mason, as well as Kiss, Sasha Makovkin, Reginald Dixon, and Alice Bradbury.

Ross also helped studio potters find viable sources of clay. In 1958, Ross, Olea Davis, Reg Dixon, and Stan Clarke used a grant from the Leon and Thea Koerner Foundation to prepare a report on British Columbia clays for the UBC Extension Department.

In 1949, after a visit to the Canadian Guild of Potters in Ontario, Ross, Davis, Avery Huyghe, and Stan Clarke decided to found the Potters Guild of British Columbia. This was accomplished in 1955 with Davis as the first president.
