= Marianne Bluger =

Canadian poet (1945–2005)

Marianne Bluger (August 28, 1945 – October 29, 2005) was a Canadian poet. She was a recipient of the Archibald Lampman Award.

== Life ==
Bluger was born in Ottawa. She graduated with distinction from McGill University where she studied pre-medical subjects and philosophy as well as taking poetry courses with Louis Dudek.

She later dropped out of medical school to marry a Zen Master Samu of Toronto. They had two children: Michael "Maji" Kim (b. 1969), and Micheline "Agi" Mallory (b. 1970). She married Larry Neily, in 1991.

She was executive secretary – treasurer of the Canadian Writers' Foundation, from 1975 to 2000. She co-founded Christians Against Apartheid, and the Tabitha Foundation.

== Awards ==
- Canada Council
- 1993 Lampman-Scott Award

== Works ==
- The Thumbless Man is at the Piano. Three Trees Press. 1981. ISBN 0-88823-045-1.
- On Nights Like This. Brick Books. 1984. ISBN 0-919626-25-4.
- Gathering Wild. Brick Books. 1987. ISBN 0-919626-35-1.
- Summer Grass. Brick Books. 1992. ISBN 0-919626-59-9.
- Bluger, Marianne; Haas, Rudi (1996). Tamarack & Clearcut. Carleton University Press. ISBN 0-88629-293-X.
- Gusts. Penumbra Press. 1999. ISBN 0-921254-86-5.
- Scissor, Paper, Woman. Penumbra Press. 2000. ISBN 1-894131-01-0.
- Early Evening Pieces. BuschekBooks. 2003. ISBN 1-894543-14-9.
- Zen Mercies / Small Satoris. Penumbra Press. 2005. ISBN 1-894131-75-4.
- The Eternities. St. Thomas Poetry Series. 2005. ISBN 0-9735910-2-1.
- Nude with Scar. Penumbra Press. 2006. ISBN 1-894131-93-2.

=== Anthologies ===
- Bruce Ross, ed. (1993). Haiku Moment: An Anthology of Contemporary North American Haiku. Tuttle Publishing. ISBN 978-0-8048-1820-9.

== Reviews ==
Marianne Bluger's seventh book, Scissor, Paper, Woman, invests in images so precise they resound far beyond the pages that contain them.
