= Nina Berkhout =

Canadian poet and novelist

Nina Berkhout (born 1975) is a Canadian poet and novelist.

== Career ==
Berkhout won the Archibald Lampman Award in 2013 for Elseworlds, a volume of poetry. The award was for the year's best poetry. She is the author of The Gallery of Lost Species, a novel. Berkhout's earlier work has been shortlisted for THIS magazine's Great Canadian Literary Hunt, The Archibald Lampman Award, and the John Hirsch Award.

== Bibliography ==
- This Bright Dust (2024)
- The Gallery of Lost Species (2015)
- Why Birds Sing (2020)
