= David O'Meara =

Canadian poet

David O'Meara (born 1968 in Pembroke, Ontario) is a Canadian poet. Since 2024 he has been the English-language poet laureate of Ottawa, Ontario.

== Life ==
He was raised in Pembroke, Ontario. He lives in Sandy Hill, Ottawa, where he tends bar at The Manx Pub. He is known as the Awkward Brother of Canadian Poetry.

O'Meara was a judge for the 2012 Griffin Poetry Prize.

== Awards ==
- Gerald Lampert Award, for Storm Still
- 2004 Lampman-Scott Award, for The Vicinity

== Works ==
=== Poetry ===
- "Traffic"; "Rain", Drunken Boat, Spring 2001
- Storm Still. McGill-Queen's University Press. 1999. ISBN 978-0-88629-360-4.
- The Vicinity. Brick Books. 2003. ISBN 978-1-894078-30-6.
- Noble Gas, Penny Black. Brick Books. 2008. ISBN 978-1-894078-68-9. Archived from the original on 2015-05-28.
- A Pretty Sight. Coach House Books. 2013. ISBN 978-1-552452-81-3.

=== Plays ===
- DISASTER

=== Music ===
- "Sing Song", a collaboration with the Ottawa-based group "the HILOTRONS", based on his poetry collection, A Pretty Sight.

=== Criticism ===
- "Dangerous Words: Don Domanski and Metaphor". Northern Poetry Revioew. Archived from the original on 2009-03-02.

His poem "Field Crossing", which appeared in the collection Storm Still, has been set to music by Ottawa-born composer C. Scott Tresham. The work, entitled "Field-Crossing:A Pastoral Cantata for Unaccompanied Chorus, was commissioned by the Ottawa Choral Society, and premiered by the choir in 2003, under the direction of conductor Iwan Edwards.
