= Colin Morton =

Canadian poet (born 1948)

Colin Morton (born 1948) is a Canadian poet.

== Personal life ==
Morton was born in Toronto, Ontario, but grew up in Calgary, Alberta, and has worked as a teacher and editor.

His poetry and fiction have appeared in Descant, The Fiddlehead, Arc, Grain, The Malahat Review, Ascent, and The North American Review among many other publications. He was a member of the performance group First Draft which recorded, published, and performed some 40 times across Canada in the 1980s. More recently, his poetry has explored aspects of world history.

In 1986 and again in 2001 he won the Archibald Lampman Award for poetry. His book of poetry The Merzbook was inspired by the life and work of Kurt Schwitters, and was the basis for a dramatic production, The Cabbage of Paradise. The sound-poem, Primiti Too Taa, based on Schwitters' Ursonate (Sonata in primitive sounds), was made into an animated short film by Ed Ackerman, featuring Morton's voice and a stop-motion animation of moving letters, made using a typewriter. It received several awards, including a Bronze Apple.

His book The Hundred Cuts: Sitting Bull and the Major is a poetic documentary about the exile in Canada of Lakota chief Sitting Bull, and his relationship with Major James Walsh of the NWMP.

He lives in Ottawa, Ontario.

== Selected bibliography ==
- "Where Were You When?; All That Is Solid". Blue Moon Review. 1998.
- "Leaf Press". 2011.
- In Transit (1981), ISBN 0-920066-44-5 http://capa.conncoll.edu/morton.tran.htm
- This Won't Last Forever (1985), ISBN 0-919285-31-7 http://capa.conncoll.edu/morton.last.htm
- The Merzbook: Kurt Schwitters Poems (1987), ISBN 0-919627-46-3 http://capa.conncoll.edu/morton.merzbook.html
- How to Be Born Again (1982), ISBN 1-55082-036-2
- Oceans Apart (1995), ISBN 1-55082-136-9 (novel)
- Coastlines of the Archipelago (2000), ISBN 1-894543-00-9
- Dance, Misery (2003), ISBN 0-9689723-8-1
- The Cabbage of Paradise (2007), ISBN 978-0-9735487-7-8
- The Local Cluster (2008), ISBN 978-1-931247-54-2
- The Hundred Cuts: Sitting Bull and the Major (2009), ISBN 978-1-894543-55-2
- Winds and Strings (2013), ISBN 978-1-894543-79-8

=== Edited ===
- The Scream: First Draft, the third annual group show Ouroboros (1984), ISBN 0-920301-04-5
- Colin Morton, ed. (1989). Capital Poets: An Ottawa Anthology. Ottawa, ON: Ouroboros. ISBN 0-920301-12-6.
