= George Fertig =

Canadian artist (1915–1983)

George Fertig (1915–1983) was a Canadian artist. He was born in Carmangay, Alberta and died in Burnaby, British Columbia. He began with photography in his early 20s and started oil painting at the age of 24. In 1941, he moved to Vancouver from Trail. He exhibited in the B.C. Artists Annual Exhibition in the 1940s and early 1950s. But with the rise of abstraction and the confines of the sociopolitical climate of the Vancouver Art Gallery and the Vancouver School of Art, his work was rarely seen outside of the Gallery of B.C. Arts in the 1960s and 1970s. The Burnaby Art Gallery held a retrospective of his work in 2010 and his daughter Mona Fertig wrote and published The Life and Art of George Fertig, the 3rd book in the Unheralded Artists of BC series-Mother Tongue Publishing, for the exhibition.

He was profoundly influenced by world art: Gauguin, Chardin, and the writings of Carl Jung. Fertig, along with David Marshall, Peter Paul Ochs, Jock Hearn, LeRoy Jensen, Frank Molnar, and Jack Ackroyd, belongs to a group of neglected artists that are part of Vancouver art history of the 1940s, 1950s, and 1960s. George Fertig was married to Evelyn (née Luxa) Fertig (1925–1994). They have two daughters.
