= Samu (sunim) =

Buddhist monk (1941–2022)

- Title: Sunim

Personal life
- Born: Sam-Woo Chin-Sam Kim; 3 March 1941 Korea
- Died: 6 August 2022 (aged 81) Toronto, Ontario, Canada
- Spouse: Marianne Bluger (1968 - 1986) Sanha Sunim (Jung-Soon Park) (1999 - 2008)
- Children: Michael Adam (Maji) Kim (b. 1969 d. 2024) Micheline (Agi) Kim (b. 1970)

Religious life
- Religion: Buddhism
- School: Seon

Senior posting
- Teacher: Solbong
- Based in: New York, New York
- Successor: Toan José Castelão
- Website: www.zenbuddhisttemple.org

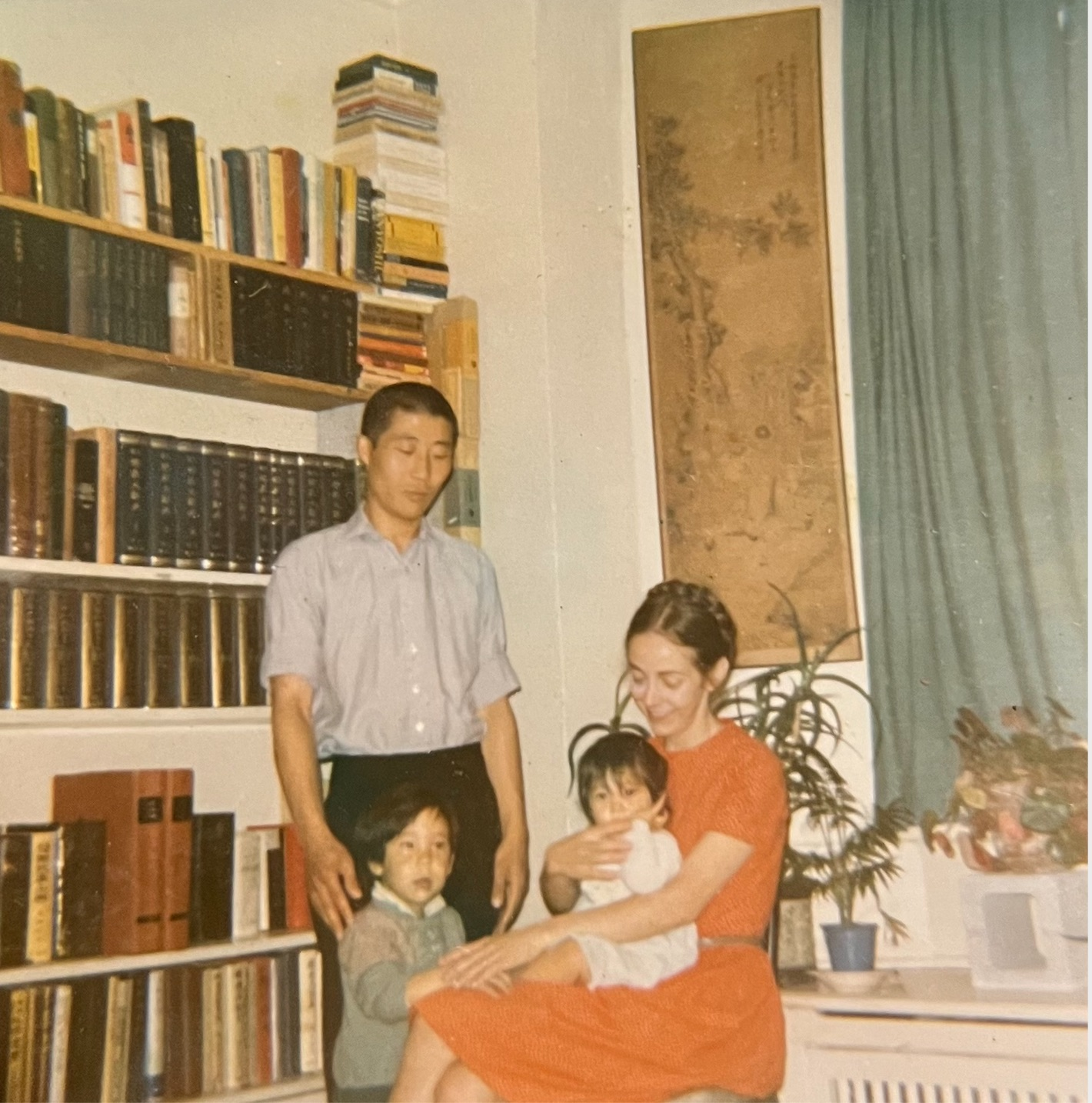
Sunim with wife Marianne and children (Maji and Agi), 1970

The Venerable Samu Sunim (3 March 1941 – 6 August 2022), born Sam-Woo Kim, was a Korean Seon sunim previously of the Jogye Order. He claimed to have received Dharma transmission from Zen Master Weolha Sunim in 1983. He taught primarily in Canada and the United States, having opened centers in Toronto, New York City, Ann Arbor, Michigan and Chicago, Illinois as well as Mexico City.

== Early life and monastic training ==
Samu was born in Chinju, South Korea, on 3 March 1941. Orphaned during the Korean War, he entered a Buddhist monastery following a period of homelessness. In 1958 he began his three-year novitiate at Namjang-sa Monastery in Sangju. He was ordained as a disciple of Tongsan (1890–1965) and he completed his Zen training under Solbong at Beomeosa (범어사) in Busan, South Korea in 1956 at the age of 15.

== Journey to the West and founding the Zen Lotus Society ==
Forced into military service despite being a monk, Samu left South Korea for Japan and eventually the West. He arrived in New York City in August 1967. To support himself, he worked the night shift at UPS and spent his days making and distributing posters in Washington Square Park and Greenwich Village. In the evenings, before work, he led meditation sessions, which marked the beginning of the Zen Lotus Society.

In February 1968, Samu moved to Montreal, Canada, where he officially founded the Zen Lotus Society (now the Buddhist Society for Compassionate Wisdom). Living in a second-floor apartment at 3628 Park Avenue, this became the first Zen center in Montreal, hosting regular meditation classes and weekend retreats. While initially a monk within the Jogye Order, his new society did not require celibacy. During this time, he married Marianne Bluger, whom he met at McGill University, and their two children, Michael (b. 1969) and Micheline (b. 1970), were born.

In the summer of 1969, the Society acquired land near Brockville, Ontario, with the aim of developing a rural spiritual community and retreat site. However, due to the impending demolition of his Park Avenue residence, Samu moved alone to Knowlton, Quebec, in the fall of 1970, and the Society temporarily ceased to function.

== Renunciation and re-establishment in Toronto ==
In the spring of 1972, Samu moved to Toronto with his family, settling in a basement apartment at 378 Markham Street. Soon after, he separated from Marianne, renouncing his family to dedicate himself to Buddhist teachings and focus on his role as a Buddhist teacher. Marianne raised their children as a single mother in Ottawa.

Samu then embarked on a three-year solitary retreat. Upon its completion in late 1977, he held a service to transmit the Dharma of his teacher, Solbong Sunim, becoming his Dharma heir. Following this, he reactivated the Zen Lotus Society from his Toronto apartment, serving the Korean-Canadian community and offering meditation instruction.

In 1979, Samu and his students moved the Zen Lotus Society into a former synagogue on Vaughan Road in Toronto, which they extensively renovated. This location became a hub for Buddhist meditation training, art and photography exhibitions, visiting teachers, and public events like Buddha's Birthday celebrations, benefits for the poor, and peace vigils. In 1985, he established a three-year Dharma Student Training Program, now the Maitreya Buddhist Seminary, for serious students aspiring to be priests or teachers.

== Expansion and legacy ==
Samu's influence expanded beyond Toronto with the founding of several other Zen Buddhist Temples:

·Ann Arbor, Michigan (1981), which served as the American office of the Zen Lotus Society. ·Chicago, Illinois (1992). ·New York City (2011).

These temples were renovated and remodeled with the help of volunteers. In 1988, the Zen Lotus Society in Toronto moved to larger premises at the former Ukrainian Credit Union and Community Centre on College Street. There, in 1989, Samu organized "A Day of Celebration in Honor of the Dalai Lama receiving the Nobel Prize for Peace." In 1990, he organized and co-hosted a seven-day Conference on Buddhism in Canada, drawing delegates from across the country.

Samu was also deeply committed to inter-Buddhist dialogue. He organized the "Zen Buddhism in North America" conference in Ann Arbor in 1986 for a new generation of North American-trained Zen teachers. In 1987, also in Ann Arbor, he organized the "Conference on World Buddhism in North America," a significant gathering of ethnic and Western Buddhist leaders from various traditions active in North America.

He further contributed to Buddhist discourse through his publications:

Spring Wind-Buddhist Cultural Forum: An international Buddhist quarterly journal published from 1983 to 1986.

Buddhism at the Crossroads: A Buddhist magazine initiated in 1990.

Samu claimed to have received a more traditional authorization as a Zen master from Weolha in 1983 and is frequently cited in works by his former student, Geri Larkin. He served as Zen Master of the Society's five temples in Toronto, Ann Arbor, Chicago, Mexico City, and New York City.

Samu died from Parkinson's disease in Toronto on August 6, 2022, at the age of 81.

== See also ==
- Buddhism in Canada
- Buddhism in the United States
- Timeline of Zen Buddhism in the United States
