= Laura Farina =

Canadian poet

- Education: Canterbury High School
- Occupation: Poet

Laura Farina is a Canadian poet.

== Life ==
She grew up in Ottawa and attended Canterbury High School.

== Awards ==
- 2006 Archibald Lampman Award for This Woman Alphabetical

== Works ==
- Some Talk of Being Human. Mansfield Press. 2014. ISBN 978-1771260459.
- "Twelve Lines for Spring"; "Fish", This Magazine, May-June 2008
- This Woman Alphabetical. Pedlar Press. 2005. ISBN 978-1-897141-04-5.

=== Anthologies ===
- "What the Highway Said to Me; Slow". OTTAWATER 4 (PDF).

=== Editor ===
- Glenn Clifton; Laura Farina; Beth Follett, eds. (2004). Under the Poet Tree : a Centauri Anthology. Pedlar Press. ISBN 978-0-9732140-6-2.

== Reviews ==
Laura Farina's debut collection, This Woman Alphabetical, is at the forefront of this neo-Modernist sensibility. The biggest strengths of Farina's book are the predominant imagist and surrealist impulses in her poems. ...it is a surprising, if not controversial, choice—probably good for poetry in Canada, and definitely good for Farina.
