= Diana Brebner =

Canadian poet

- Born: May 20, 1956; Kingston, Ontario, Canada
- Died: April 29, 2001 (aged 44); Ottawa, Ontario, Canada
- Occupation: poet

(Jennivien) Diana Brebner (May 20, 1956 – April 29, 2001) was a Canadian poet. She was a recipient of the Archibald Lampman Award.

== Life ==
Diana Brebner was the eldest daughter of Dutch immigrants and grew up in a suburb of Montreal, Quebec. She was educated at the University of Ottawa, the city she made her home for the remainder of her life.

Brebner's first three collections of poetry were published by Hendrika Ruger on Netherlandic Press. Her posthumous collection, The Ishtar Gate: Last and Selected Poems, was edited by Stephanie Bolster and published in 2005. The Diana Brebner Prize is awarded annually by Arc magazine.

== Awards ==
Brebner won the Gerald Lampert Award in 1991 for Radiant Life Forms, the Pat Lowther Award in 1994 for The Golden Lotus, the Archibald Lampman Award in 1997 for Flora & Fauna.

== Bibliography ==
- Radiant Life Forms (1990) ISBN 0-919417-21-3
- The Golden Lotus (1993) ISBN 0-919417-31-0
- Flora & Fauna (1996) ISBN 0-919417-44-2
- The Ishtar Gate: Last and Selected Poems. McGill-Queen's Press - MQUP. 2004. ISBN 978-0-7735-2835-2.
