= Christopher Levenson =

Canadian poet (born 1934)

- Born: February 13, 1934 (age 92); London, England
- Education: Cambridge University; University of Iowa
- Occupation: Poet

Christopher Levenson (born February 13, 1934, in London, England) is a Canadian poet.

== Life ==
Levenson was educated at Harrow County Grammar School for Boys and Downing College, Cambridge, where he read English under F.R.Leavis. He later received a further degree from the University of Iowa.

Levenson lived in the Netherlands and Germany, before moving in 1968 to Ottawa, Canada, where he taught English at Carleton University from 1968 to 1999. He became a Canadian citizen in 1973. He was co-founder, and first editor of Arc Poetry Magazine. , and taught for many years at Carleton University.

His work appeared in The Antigonish Review, among other journals, and he is a member of the Writers' Union of Canada.

== Awards ==
- 1960 Eric Gregory Award
- 1987 Archibald Lampman Award

== Works ==
=== Poetry ===
- Cairns. Chatto & Windus; Hogarth Press. 1969. ISBN 978-0-7011-1486-2.
- Stills. (Chatto & Windus, London, 1972).
- Into the Open. Golden Dog Press. 1977. ISBN 978-0-919614-23-9.
- The Journey Back. Sesame Press. 1978. ISBN 978-0-920580-00-4.
- Arriving at Night. Mosaic Press. 1986. ISBN 978-0-88962-341-5.
- The Return. Mandeville Press, England. 1986. ISBN 978-0-904533-96-5.
- Half Truths. (Wolsak and Wynn, 1990).
- Duplicities: New and Selected Poems. Mosaic Press. 1992. ISBN 978-0-88962-527-3.
- The Bridge. BuschekBooks. 2000. ISBN 978-1-894543-02-6.
- Local Time. Stone Flower Press. 2006. ISBN 978-0-9737607-2-9.
- Night Vision. Quattro Books. 2014. ISBN 978-1927443-58-3.

=== Translations ===
- Light of the World: An Anthology of Seventeenth Century Dutch Religious and Occasional Poetry. Netherlandic Press. 1982. ISBN 978-0-919417-04-5.
- Seeking Love's Solace (Aliquando Press, 1982).

=== Editor ===
- Carol Shields (1992). Coming to Canada. McGill-Queen's Press - MQUP. ISBN 978-0-88629-187-7.
- Christopher Levenson, George Johnston, ed. (1974). Carleton University Student Poetry 1973-74. Carleton University.
- Reconcilable Differences: The Changing Face of Poetry by Canadian Men Since 1970. (Bayeux Arts, 1994)
