= Mother Tongue Publishing =

- Founded: 1995
- Founder: Mona Fertig
- Country of origin: Canada
- Distribution: Heritage Group Distribution
- Publication types: Books
- Official website: mothertonguepublishing.com

Mother Tongue Publishing is a small independent Canadian publishing company located on the West Coast of British Columbia. Mother Tongue publishes bold and beautiful books of B.C. fiction, poetry, creative non-fiction and the series, The Unheralded Artists of BC, dedicated to recognizing forgotten 20th century B.C. artists (1900s-1960s) and opening a door to their artistic and historic significance.

== History ==
Mother Tongue was founded in 1995 by B.C. poet and literary organizer Mona Fertig (who in 1978 opened in Vancouver, the first literary centre in Canada–The Literary Storefront). From 1990–1994 she published a small international literary periodical called (m)Öthêr Tøñgués inspired by her term as BC representative of P.E.N. Canada. The early issues featured: Erín Moure, Thich Tue Sy, bill bissett, Roma Potiki, Kim Morrissey, Yuki Hartman, Tsvetanka Sofronieva, Dorothy Livesay, Duo Duo, Ann Diamond, Mark Sutherland, Kim Chi-Ha, Memoye Abijah Ogu, Hans Raimund, Arturo Arias, John Barlow, Sigitas Geda, Liliane Welch, Marie Luise Kashnitz.

In 1994 Mona Fertig and her husband Peter Haase began publishing beautiful limited editions of Canadian poetry under the imprint of (m)Öthêr Tøñgué Press with acquired letterpress presses and type. MTP held the first poetry manuscript contest in Canada. Judges included Daphne Marlatt, Brian Brett, Phyllis Webb, Susan Musgrave, Cathy Ford, Charles Lillard, P. K. Page, Robert Kroetsch and Marilyn Bowering. First and 2nd prize manuscripts were published in beautiful signed limited editions. By 2007 twenty-eight (m)Öthêr Tøñgué Press chapbooks and broadsides by Canadian writers were available by; Stephanie Bolster, Lorna Crozier, Kate Braid, Cathy Ford, Maxine Gadd, Shirley Graham, Penn Kemp, Robert Kroetsch, Sylvia Legris, Peter Levitt, Sandi Frances Duncan, Patricia Young, Daphne Marlatt, Susan McCaslin, P.K. Page, Murray Reiss, Nadine Shelly, Peter Such and Phyllis Webb.

In 2008, after 18 years of operation as an established private literary press on Salt Spring Island Mona and Peter decided to expand their publishing mandate, incorporate, and enter into trade publishing and Mother Tongue Publishing was born.

In 2010 MTP published their first novel Everything Was Good-bye by Gurjinder Basran, the winner of their 1st Search for the Great BC novel contest. It went on to win the 2011 Ethel Wilson Fiction Prize. MTP sold Canadian rights to Penguin Canada and Everything Was Good-bye was released in the Canada in 2012 and the US in 2013. It was one of Canada Reads Top 10 books in BC and Yukon in 2012. The winner of the 2nd Search for the Great BC Novel is Kathy Para for Lucky. Lucky will be published, fall 2013.

MTP was honoured as Publisher as the 2013 Galiano Literary Festival, was the 2012 Finalist for the City of Vancouver Book Award and short-listed for the Roderick Haig-Brown Regional Prize, long-listed in 2011 for the ReLit Awards, a Recipient in 2011 for the Pandora’s Collective Publishers Award and in 2011 MTP made the Honor Roll of Publishers by the Pacific Northwest Chapter of American Society of Indexing.

Mother Tongue Publishing has published fifteen trade titles. The 3rd book in the Unheralded Artists series was The Life and Art of George Fertig based on the life of Mona Fertig's father and which took 14 years to research and write.
