= Arthur Doughty =

Canadian civil servant

Sir Arthur G. Doughty
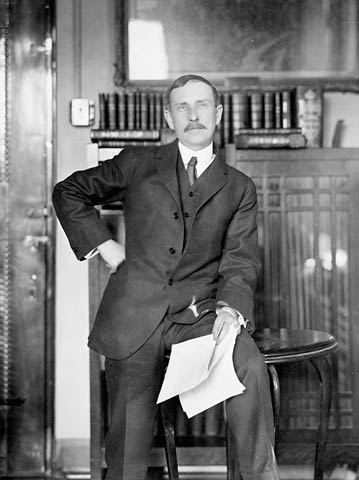
- Sir Arthur G. Doughty c. 1912–13
- Born: 22 March 1860; Maidenhead, Berkshire, England
- Died: 1 December 1936 (aged 76); Ottawa, Ontario, Canada
- Awards: Flavelle Medal (1927)

Sir Arthur George Doughty KBE CMG FRSC (22 March 1860 – 1 December 1936) was a Canadian civil servant and Dominion Archivist and Keeper of the Public Records.

== Life ==
Born in Maidenhead, Berkshire, England, the son of William Doughty, Doughty was educated at the public schools in Maidenhead, at Lord Eldon School in London, and at New Inn Hall, Oxford. He emigrated to Canada in 1886 settling in Montreal. He was appointed to a position in the revenue department of the government of Quebec and in 1897 became private secretary to the Minister of Public Works. In 1900, he was named joint librarian of the Legislative Assembly of Quebec and in May 1904 was appointed as the second Dominion Archivist and Keeper of the Records. He served in this post until 1935. Under his leadership, the Public Archives of Canada undertook to locate and list important archival material in different areas of Canada. He wrote or edited a number of books, on topics such as the Siege of Quebec and the Battle of the Plains of Abraham, 1759; Canadian constitutional documents, and the 23-volume work Canada and its Provinces, which Doughty edited with Adam Shortt. He wrote the article on Samuel de Champlain for the Catholic Encyclopedia.

In 1900, he was elected a Fellow of the Royal Historical Society. He was also a Fellow of the Royal Society of Canada. In 1927, he was awarded the Royal Society of Canada's Flavelle Medal. In 1905 he was created a Companion of the Order of Saint Michael and Saint George. He was created a Knight Commander of the Order of the British Empire. He encouraged the creation of archives by the provincial governments and served on the Board of the Public Archives of Nova Scotia when it was reconstituted in 1929.

Across the world, one of the most quoted statements made by Sir Arthur George Doughty in 1924 concerned the essential value of keeping and maintaining good and full records in an organised national archive when he said:

"Of all national assets, archives are the most precious, they are the gifts of one generation to another, and the extent of our care of them marks the extent of our civilisation. As a rule the papers of a given generation are seldom required after their reception and primary use; but when all personal touch with that period has ceased, then these records assume a startling importance, for they replace hands that have vanished and lips that are sealed."

Following his death, a statue of Sir Arthur was erected in front of the National Archives of Canada, then located on Sussex Drive in Ottawa. This is one of only two statues of civil servants erected in Ottawa, both at the instigation of Prime Minister MacKenzie King. In the 1960s, the statue was moved behind the new National Archives building on Wellington Street.

== Works ==
- Under the lily & the rose : a short history of Canada for children - Vol. 1
- Under the lily & the rose : a short history of Canada for children - Vol. 2
- A daughter of New France : being a story of the life and times of Magdelaine de Verchères, 1665-1692
- The cradle of New France : a story of the city founded by Champlain
- The probable site of the battle of the Plains of Abraham
- The siege of Quebec and the battle of the Plains of Abraham
- Bibliography of the Siege of Quebec in three parts
- Quebec under two flags : a brief history of the city from its foundation until the present time
- The fortress of Quebec, 1608-1903 : with illustrations
- The King's book of Quebec, Vol. 1
- The King's book of Quebec, Vol. 2
- The Acadian exiles : a chronicle of the land of Evangeline
- The Canadian archives and its activities
- Documents relating to the constitutional history of Canada, 1759-1791
- Documents relating to the constitutional history of Canada, 1791-1818
- Canada and its provinces; a history of the Canadian people and their institutions by one hundred associates
  - Index and dictionary of Canadian history
  - Vol. 01
  - Vol. 02
  - Vol. 03
  - Vol. 04
  - Vol. 05
  - Vol. 06
  - Vol. 07
  - Vol. 08
  - Vol. 09
  - Vol. 10
  - Vol. 11
  - Vol. 12
  - Vol. 13
  - Vol. 14
  - Vol. 15
  - Vol. 16
  - Vol. 17
  - Vol. 18
  - Vol. 19
  - Vol. 20
  - Vol. 21
  - Vol. 22
  - Vol. 23
- Nugae canorae
