= Arc Poetry Magazine =

Canadian magazine

- Managing Editor: Chris Johnson
- Coordinating Editor: Manahil Bandukwala
- Categories: Literary magazine
- Frequency: Triannual
- First issue: 1978
- Country: Canada
- Based in: Ottawa
- Language: English
- Website: arcpoetry.ca

Arc Poetry Magazine is a triannual literary magazine established in 1978, publishing poetry and prose about poetry.

== History ==
Arc was started in 1978 by Carleton University professors Christopher Levenson, Michael Gnarowski and Tom Henighan.

Arc became an independent not-for-profit organization unaffiliated with Carleton University after only a few issues. Christopher Levenson remained the editor until 1988. Arc has published works by significant Canadian poets such as Carol Shields, Don Domanski, Steven Heighton, Di Brandt, Erín Moure, Diana Brebner, George Elliott Clarke, Robin Skelton, Roo Borson, and Bronwen Wallace.

Arc's mission is to nurture and promote composition and appreciation of poetry in Canada and abroad, with particular but not exclusive emphasis on poetry written by Canadians. In addition to publishing and distributing the work of poets, Arc Poetry Magazine organizes and administers awards, contests, public readings and other events.

The title refers to Michael Gnarowski's idea of "a poetry magazine that would counteract the burgeoning chauvinism, and be open to contributions from all quarters, a magazine that would not espouse Canadian nationalism as such, but would extend an 'arc' to encompass Canadian contributions, while by no means shutting the door on any writer because of his or her background, origins, political or aesthetic affiliations."

== Awards presented by Arc ==
- Archibald Lampman Award
- Diana Brebner Prize
- Poem of the Year Contest
- Confederation Poets Prize
- Critics' Desk Award

== See also ==
- List of literary magazines
