= Gary Geddes =

Canadian poet and writer (born 1940)

- Born: June 9, 1940 (age 86); Vancouver, British Columbia, Canada
- Education: University of British Columbia; University of Toronto (MA, PhD)
- Occupations: Poet; writer

Gary Geddes (born June 9, 1940 in Vancouver, British Columbia) is a Canadian poet and writer.

== Biography ==
He spent four years of his childhood on the Canadian prairies, but otherwise remained on the west coast until 1963, where he got his bachelor's degree in English and Philosophy at the University of British Columbia. Geddes received his M.A. and Ph.D. in English at the University of Toronto. He taught English and Creative Writing at Concordia University for twenty years (1978–1998). Then he returned to the west coast, where he was appointed Distinguished Professor of Canadian Culture at Western Washington University (1998–2001). He has also taught English at the British Columbia Institute of Technology and the University of Victoria, as well as serving as a writer-in-residence at Green College (UBC) and the Vancouver Public Library. In 2007 he received an Honorary Doctor of Laws degree from Royal Roads University.

Geddes has written and edited over thirty-five books, including seventeen books of poetry, as well as fiction, non-fiction, drama, translation, criticism and anthologies. His work has been translated into five languages. Before embarking on his literary career, he worked as a gillnet fisherman, loaded boxcars at BC Sugar Refinery, stocked shelves at Woodwards, worked as a fishing guide and drove a water-taxi. Geddes is known as one of Canada's best political poets, having been singled out for this honour by literary critic George Woodcock in the late 1960s, whose claim graced the back cover of many of Geddes' books. Geddes has explored human rights issues in places such as Chile during its dictatorship, in Nicaragua during its civil war, and in Palestine and Israel after the Oslo peace accord. He lives on Thetis Island, British Columbia.

== Literature and the environment ==
Gary Geddes is most known for being a political and humanist poet, but his writing is also deeply rooted in place. Although he cannot be defined as an environmental writer or nature writer, early books such as Snakeroot (1973) and more recent work such as Sailing Home: A Journey through Time, Place & Memory (2001) are based around a specific place and explore the human relationship with that environment. Geddes's relationship to the environment seems to be strongly nostalgic: Sailing Home is a memoir of his personal search for a place which may no longer exist, or may have changed beyond recognition, and Snakeroot also involves revisiting a landscape which is no longer home.

Geddes approaches the environment with an attitude that ranges from confrontational to appreciative. In the poem "ladder grass" (from Snakeroot), he reveals the appreciative side: "The ladder grass/ at my feet is unique, splendid," and in "snakeroot" he says, "The road to hell is paved." However, these lines co-exist in the book that contains the poem "blood and feathers," which is far more confrontational towards nature, especially in the opening lines "I refuse to be seasonal, stirred/ to a frenzy by a planet’s turning. Let the dead rocks and dying grasses/ speak for themselves, or be dumb." Whether confrontational or appreciative, though, Geddes' responses to the environment seem based in a strong attachment to the places he has lived, and in an undeniable connection between human beings and their surroundings. In 2010, Robert G. May edited a collection of critical studies, Gary Geddes: Essays on His Works (Guernica Editions), which includes contributions by: W. H. New, M. Wynn Thomas, Winnifred M. Bogaards, Shirley McDonald, Lake Sagaris and Robert G. May.

== Bibliography ==
Poetry

- Poems (1971)
- Rivers Inlet (1972)
- Snakeroot (1973)
- Letter of the Master of Horse (1973)
- War & other measures (1976)
- The Acid Test (1980)
- The Terracotta Army (1984)
- Changes of State (1986)
- Hong Kong (1987)
- No Easy Exit (1989)
- Light of Burning Towers (1990)
- Girl by the Water (1994)
- The Perfect Cold Warrior (1995)
- Active Trading: Selected Poems 1970-1995 (1996)
- Flying Blind (1998)
- Skaldance (2004)
- Falsework (2007)
- Swimming Ginger (2010)
- What Does A House Want? (2014
- The Resumption of Play (2016)

Fiction

- The Unsettling of the West (1986)

Non-Fiction

- Letters from Managua: Meditations on Politics & Art (1990)
- Sailing Home: A Journey through Time, Place & Memory (2001)
- Kingdom of Ten Thousand Things: An Impossible Journey from Kabul to Chiapas (2005)
- Drink the Bitter Root: A Search for Justice and Healing in Africa (2010, USA 2011)
- Medicine Unbundled: A Journey through the Minefields of Indigenous Health Care (2017)

Drama

- Les Maudits Anglais (1984)

Translation

- I Didn't Notice the Mountain Growing Dark (1986), poems of Li Bai and Du Fu, translated with the assistance of George Liang

Criticism

- Conrad's Later Novels (1980)
- Out of the Ordinary: Politics, Poetry & Narrative (2009)
- Bearing Witness (2016)

Anthologies

- 70 Canadian Poets (2014)
- 20th-Century Poetry & Poetics (1969, 1973, 1985, 1996, 2006)
- 15 Canadian Poets Times 3 (1971, 1977, 1988, 2001)
- Skookum Wawa: Writings of the Canadian Northwest (1975)
- Divided We Stand (1977)
- The Inner Ear (1983)
- Chinada: Memoirs of the Gang of Seven (1983)
- Vancouver: Soul of A City (1986)
- Compañeros: Writings about Latin America (1990)
- The Art of Short Fiction: An International Anthology (1992; brief edition, 2000)

== Awards ==
- E.J. Pratt Medal and Prize for Poetry (1970)
- National Poetry Prize, for The Acid Test (1981)
- Canadian Authors Association Literary Award, poetry (1982)
- Commonwealth Poetry Competition (Americas Region), for The Terracotta Army (1985)
- Writers' Choice Award (1988)
- National Magazine Gold Award, for Hong Kong (1987)
- Archibald Lampman Award (1990 and 1996)
- Arvon International Poetry Competition, short list (1993)
- Poetry Book Society Recommendation, UK, for Active Trading (1996)
- Gabriela Mistral Prize from the Government of Chile (1996)
- Royal Roads honours a humanitarian poet..., Royal Roads University, he was awarded an honorary doctorate of laws for his lifetime of human-rights work and for advancing literature in Canada, 2007
- Lieutenant Governor's Award for Literary Excellence in British Columbia (2008)
- Malahat Review Long Poem Prize (2016)
- Freedom to Read Award 2018, in recognition of his body of work that promotes free expression
- Geddes, All Awards and Honours 1970 – 2010, at University of Toronto Libraries
