= Billeh Nickerson =

Canadian writer (born 1972)

- Born: February 14, 1972 (age 54); Halifax, Nova Scotia, Canada
- Education: University of Victoria; University of British Columbia
- Occupations: Writer; editor; performer; producer; arts advocate

Billeh Nickerson (born February 14, 1972) is a Canadian writer, editor, performer, producer and arts advocate.

== Personal life ==
Nickerson was born in Halifax, Nova Scotia, grew up in Langley, British Columbia, lived in Toronto, Ontario, and currently resides in Vancouver, British Columbia. He earned an undergraduate degree in fine arts from the University of Victoria and a master's degree in fine arts from the University of British Columbia.

== Writing and editing ==
In 2000, Nickerson published The Asthmatic Glassblower and other poems with Arsenal Pulp. It was nominated for the Publishing Triangle's Thom Gunn Award. He is also the author of the humorous essay collection Let Me Kiss It Better: Elixirs for the Not So Straight and Narrow (Arsenal Pulp, 2002) and co-editor of Seminal: The Anthology of Canada's Gay Male Poets with John Barton (Arsenal Pulp, 2007). He was writer in residence at Berton House in Dawson City during July and August 2010.

In 2009, he published McPoems. He followed up in 2012 with Impact: The Titanic Poems, a collection of poetry inspired by the 100th anniversary of the sinking of the Titanic.

His most recent collection, Artificial Cherry, was published in 2014. The book was a shortlisted finalist for the 2014 City of Vancouver Book Award.

Nickerson is a founding member of the performance troupe Haiku Night in Canada. He is also the past editor of the literary journals Event and Prism international.

He teaches creative writing at Kwantlen Polytechnic University.

== Publications ==
- The Asthmatic Glassblower and other poems (Arsenal Pulp, 2000)
- Let Me Kiss It Better: Elixirs for the Not So Straight and Narrow (Arsenal Pulp, 2002)
- Seminal: The Anthology of Canada's Gay Men's Poetry, co-edited by John Barton (Arsenal Pulp, 2007)
- McPoems (Arsenal Pulp, 2009)
- Impact: The Titanic Poems (2012)
- Artificial Cherry (2014)
- Blood Clot Banana Bag (2026)
