= Penn Kemp =

Canadian poet and writer (born 1944)

- Born: Patricia Penn Anne Kemp; 1944 (age 81–82); Strathroy, Ontario
- Education: University of Western Ontario; University of Toronto (MEd)
- Occupations: Poet and playwright
- Writing career
- Years active: 1972–present
- Website: pennkemp.weebly.com

Patricia Penn Anne Kemp (born 1944), better known simply as Penn Kemp, is a Canadian poet, novelist, playwright, and sound poet who lives in London, Ontario. Kemp has been publishing her writing since 1972 and was London's first poet laureate, serving from 2010 to 2013.

== Early life and education ==
Kemp was born on August 4, 1944, in Strathroy, Ontario, to parents Anne Kemp and James "Jim" Kemp. She was raised in the nearby city of London. Her father was an advertising and publicity executive at London Life Insurance, painter, and war artist. Penn says she wrote her first poem when she was six years old.

She earned a Bachelor of Arts degree in English and literature from the University of Western Ontario in 1966 and received certification as a teacher in 1968. In 1988 she received an Ontario Graduate Scholarship to complete a Masters of Education degree at the University of Toronto.

== Career ==
Kemp taught high school English in Timmins and North York, Toronto for several years.

Kemp's first book, Bearing Down, was published by Coach House in 1972. In 1973, it was performed as a radio show for four voices in Seattle. In 1984, Kemp was writer in residence for Niagara Erie Writers in New York State; for the Labrador School Board in 1986; for Flesherton Library in 1988 and '89; and at SNDT Women's University in Mumbai in 1995. In 1994, Kemp's play, What the Ear Hears Last, was produced by Theatre Passe Muraille in Toronto and, in the same year, she was featured on the CBC Radio show, "Sounding Off." In 1995 the Indian Institute of Canadian studies sponsored her tour of Mumbai colleges and universities.

She was London's inaugural Poet Laureate, serving from 2010 to 2013 and University of Western Ontario's Writer-in-Residence (2009–2010). Kemp runs Pendas Productions.

In 2021, Kemp was commissioned by Brescia University College to deliver their inaugural Women's Day Poem. During the university's fourth annual Dr. Colleen Hanycz Leadership Lecture, Kemp performed her poem "Choose to Challenge" as a riff on the theme, "Choose To Challenge: Finding Common Ground Through Dialogue."

== Personal life ==
Kemp's left London, Ontario after graduating from Western University. She returned in 2001 and her mother had a stroke. She now lives in London and considers it her home. Her husband, Gavin Stairs, developed vascular dementia and died in fall 2021.

== Works ==
=== Theater ===
- 'Homeward Bound (2015); The Spousal Song (2013). PlayWrights Cabaret, The Grand Theatre, London,
- 'The Dream Life of Teresa Harris, Eldon House, London (2013)
- 'Scenes from the Electric Folklore Machine, Aeolian Hall, London (2012)
- 'Mrtvolka, with Anne Anglin, Daniela Sneppova, Harbourfront Studio Theatre, Toronto
- 'The Space Between: A Transmorphous Journey, Wolf Performance Hall, London (2010)
- 'Re-Visions: a sound opera, with Brenda McMorrow, Bill Gilliam, Aeolian Hall, London (2009)
- 'What the Ear Might Hear, (2009); When the Heart Parts, Playwrights Cabaret (2007)
- 'Communication Breakdown, with Chris Meloche, McManus Theatre, London (2008)
- 'Re:Animating Animus: a sound opera, Aeolian Hall, London (2008)
- 'Xtra Text/ure. Symposium, Playing the Gallery: McIntosh Gallery Western U, London (2007)
- 'Darkness Visible: a sound opera, with Chris Meloche, Aeolian Hall, London (2006)
- 'Trance Dance Form: sound opera, with Bill Gilliam, Jean Martin, Brick Works, Toronto (2006)
- 'Vocal Braiding: an experiment in poetry and theatre (with Patricia Keeney, directed by Don Rubin, 2000.) Performed in Jaipur, India and for Indian television; York University
- 'Symposium on Canadian Theatre at the University of Rajasthan (with Don Rubin, 2000)
- 'Temporary Harmonies, The Music Gallery, Toronto; U. of Mumbai, India
- 'What The Ear Hears Last (The Gathering); Eros Rising, 1978, Theatre Passe Muraille, Toronto
- 'Angel Makers, Red Theatre, Toronto. Trance Dance Form, Harbourfront, Toronto (1976)
- 'The Epic of Toad and Heron: a play. Toronto Island Clubhouse and ON schools, (1977–2012)
- The Dream Life of Teresa Harris (2013)

=== Individual poems ===
- "Simultaneous Translation" in West Coast Collective, ed. (1984). Women and Words. Madeira Park, British Columbia: Harbour Publication Co.
- "The Dream Life of Teresa Harris" in Possessions: The Eldon House Poems. Eldon House. 2013.

=== Poetry collections ===
- Kemp, Penn (1972). Bearing Down. Coach House.
- Kemp, Penn; Stairs, Gavin (2001). Quand cesse le temps [Time Less Time] (in French). Translated by Gillard, Claude. Pendas Productions.
- Kemp, Penn (2001). Incrementally. Pendas Productions.
- Kemp, Penn; Keeney, Patricia (2001). Vocal Braiding. Pendas Productions.
- Kemp, Penn (2001). Suite Ancient Egypt. Salt Spring Island: (m)Other Tongue Press.
- Kemp, Penn; Hryniuk, Angela (2002). Sarasvati-Scapes. Pendas Productions.
- Kemp, Penn (2002). Poem for peace in many voices. Vol. 1 and 2. Pendas Productions.
- Kemp, Penn; Mulcahy, Gloria (2002). Gathering Voices. Pendas Productions.
- Kemp, Penn (2003). C'Loud. Pendas Productions.
- Kemp, Penn (2004). Poemas escolhidos de Penn Kemp [Selected poems by Penn Kemp]. Translated by Neneve, Miguel. Pendas Productions/Abecan.
- Kemp, Penn (2006). Re:Animating Animus. Pendas Productions.
- Kemp, Penn (2011). HELWA!. London ON: PigeonBike Press.
- Kemp, Penn (2012). From Dream Sequins. Lyrical Myrical Press.
- Kemp, Penn (2016). Barbaric Cultural Practice. Quattro Books.
- Kemp, Penn (2018). Local Heroes. Insomniac Press.
- Kemp, Penn (2019). River Revery. Insomniac Press.
- Kemp, Penn (2018). Fox Haunts. Aeolus House. ISBN 978-1987872149.
- Kemp, Penn; Thesen, Sharon (2018). P.S. Toronto: Product Photo.
- Kemp, Penn (2021). A Near Memoir: New Poems. Beliveau Books. ISBN 9781927734315.

=== Recordings ===
- On Our Own Spoke. Penn Kemp, Toronto: Pendas Productions, 2000. (CD/CD-ROM)
- Two Lips. Penn Kemp, Anne Anglin, and Susan McMaster, Toronto: Pendas Productions, 2001. (CD)
- Time Less Time. Penn Kemp, Darren Copeland, and Claude Gillard, Toronto: Pendas Productions, 2001. (CD)
- Souwesto Words: 25 poets in Southwestern Ontario. Includes recordings from Penn Kemp, John Tyndall, Molly Peacock, Emily Chung, Paul Langille, Sheila Martindale, Roy McDonald, Sadiqa Khan, Jan Figurski, Jody Trevail, Beryl Baigent, John B. Lee, Cornelia Hoogland, James Reaney, Colleen Thibaudeau, Michael Wilson, Aimee O'Beirn, Jason Dickson, Marianne Micros, Skot Deeming, Victor Elias, David J. Paul, April Bulmer, Julie Berry, Don Gutteridge, Ergo Books, 2002. (CD)

=== Sound Operas ===
- RIVER REVERY: a Sound Opera, https://www.youtube.com/@pennkemp1. Penn Kemp and Ann Denny at Westminster Pond Centre, London On, August 8 2026. Penn reads from her books River Revery, Barbaric Cultural Practice and Colour Fielding. Passport to Nature, https://www.thamestalbotlandtrust.ca/p2n_river_revery_2026.
- The Dream Life of Teresa Harris: a Sound Opera. Penn Kemp, Mary Ashton, Panayiotis Giannarapis. London: Pendas Productions. 2018.
- Helwa!: a Sound Opera, Experiencing Ancient Egypt. Penn Kemp, Mary Ashton, Panayiotis Giannarapis. London: Pendas Productions. 2018.
- Luminous Entrance. Penn Keemp, Anne Anglin, Brenda McMorrow, Rob Menegoni. 2011. (DVD)
- Night Vision: a Sound Opera. Penn Kemp, Bill Gilliam. London: Pendas Productions. 2011.
- Five Eerie Pieces. Penn Kemp, Dennis Siren. Pendas Productions. 2010. (DVD)
- Luminous Entrance: a sound opera for climate change action. Penn Kemp, Anne Anglin, Brenda McMorrow, Ruth Douthright, Rob Menegoni. DVD by Dennis Siren. Pendas Productions. 2010.
- Memory Vision. Penn Kemp, Bill Gilliam. 2008.
- Darkness Visible: a Sound Opera. Penn Kemp, Chris Meloche. Pendas Productions. 2006.
- Trance Dance Form: a Sound Opera. Penn Kemp, Bill Giliam, Jean Martin. Pendas Productions. 2006.
- Re:Animating Animus: a Sound Opera. Pendas Productions. 2005.
- Soundspoke. Penn Kemp, Anne Anglin, Bill Gilliam, Rick Sacks. Distillery Jazz Festival, Pendas Productions. 2004.
- Gathering Voices. Penn Kemp, Anne Anglin, Gloria Alvernaz Mulcahy. Pendas Productions. 2003.
- Convergence: Poets for Peace. Penumbra Press. 2002.
- Time Less Time. Penn Kemp, Darren Copeland, Claude Gillard. Toronto: Pendas Productions, 2001. (CD)
- Two Lips. Penn Kemp, Anne Anglin, and Susan McMaster. Toronto: Pendas Productions, 2001. (CD)
- "Ancient Egypt: On The Other Side Of Time." Four Women, Live. With Anne Anglin; also Marianne Micros, Gloria Mulcahy, Colleen Thibaudeau. London, Ontario: Centre for Studies in Creativity, 2001. (CD)
- From The Lunar Plexus: A Sound Opera. Penn Kemp, Bill Gilliam, John Magyar. Design Gavin Stairs. Toronto: PsychoSpace Sound Studios, Pendas Productions, 2001. (CD)
- From The House of Pan. Bill Gilliam, Penn Kemp, Marianne Micros, and Gloria Alvarnaz Mulcahey. Toronto: Pendas Productions, 2000. (CD)
- Breakfast at Epiphonemes. Sounding with Penn Kemp, Honey Novick (singer), and Dan Sargeant (guitar). Web page: http://breakfast.musicpage.com.
- On Our Own Spoke. Toronto: Pendas Productions, 2000. (CD/CD-ROM)
- Two Lips. Pendas Productions, 2000. (CD)
- When the Heart Parts. Sound opera with Anne Anglin and John Blackwood. Toronto: Pendas Productions, 1999. (CD)
- Reading in Carnivocal: A Celebration of Sound Poetry. Eds. Stephen Scobie & Douglas Barbour. Red Deer College Press, 1999. (CD)
- Souwesto Words: 25 Poets in Southwestern Ontario. Ergo Productions, 1999. (CD)
- Temporary Harmonies. Toronto: Pendas Productions & Butterfly Effects, 1996. (audiotape)
- Epiphanies. With David Prentice and Anne Anglin at the Glen Gould Studio. Toronto: Pendas Productions, 1995. (audiotape)
- On Your Own Spoke. Toronto: Pendas Productions, 1995. (audiotape)
- Inspiritrice. Toronto: Pendas Productions, 1995. (audiotape)
- Jamming in the Bardo. Toronto: Pendas Productions, 1995. (audiotape)
- What the Ear Hears Last. Toronto: Pendas Productions, 1994. (audiotape)
- Sensasound 90. With Lillian Allen, Rafael Baretto-Rivera, bill bissett, Paul Dutton, Clifton Joseph, and Steve McCaffery. Toronto: 1990. (audiotape)
- Throo. With David Prentice. Moonstone Press, 1989. (audiotape)
- Ear Rings. Sound poems with David Prentice & Anne Anglin. Underwhich Editions, 1987. (audiotape)
- Elementals, Audiographics, New Wilderness Foundation, NYC, 1985.
- Trance Dance Form. With Coby Stoller. Soft Press, 1976.
- Clouds. Performance of anti-fear, anti-nuclear chants with Anne Anglin.
- Animus. Sound poems from the book Animus and the play Eros Rising. Findhorn Spring Festival of the Arts 84: with Australian aboriginal musicians. Music Gallery performance May 86: with jazz violinist David Prentice. (Caitlin 1977)
- In Spirit Trees. Feminist sound poems and chants from Trance Form.

=== As editor ===
- Kemp, Penn, ed. (2013). Jack Layton: Art in Action. Quattro Books.
- Kemp, Penn, ed. (2016). Women & Multimedia, Poetry Collaboration/Elaboration. League of Canadian Poets.
- Kemp, Penn, ed. (2016). Performing Women. League of Canadian Poets.
- Kemp, Penn; Sitoski, Richard-Yves, eds. (2022). Poems in Response to Peril: An Anthology in Support of Ukraine. Pendas Productions and Laughing Raven Press.

=== Other works ===
- Text and introduction to Kemp, James (2002). George the Purple Spotted Horse: A Graphic Tale. Pendas Productions. ISBN 0-920820-02-6.

== Awards ==
In 2012, Kemp was awarded the League of Canadian Poets' Life Membership Award. Kemp received a Queen Elizabeth II Diamond Jubilee Medal in 2013 for her service to the arts. In 2015, the League of Canadian Poets awarded Kemp the Sheri-D Wilson Golden Beret Award, which honoured her as a spoken-word poet.
