= Gutteridge =

Gutteridge is a surname. Notable people with the surname include:

- Bernard Gutteridge (1916–1985), English poet
- Christopher Gutteridge, British software developer
- Don Gutteridge (1912–2008), American baseball player
- Don Gutteridge (writer) (born 1937), Canadian author
- Gordon Gutteridge (1892–1942), Australian civil engineer
- Helena Gutteridge (1879-1960), English-Canadian feminist
- Jeff Gutteridge (born 1956), English pole vaulter
- Joseph Gutteridge (1816–1899), English naturalist
- Lucy Gutteridge (born 1956), British actress
- Martin Gutteridge (born 1939), British special effects artist
- Mary Valentine Gutteridge (1887–1962), Australian educationalist and kindergarten principal
- May Gutteridge (1917–2002), English-Canadian social worker
- Melanie Gutteridge (born 1972), British actress
- Michael Gutteridge (1842–1935), English businessman and Methodist
- Michael Gutteridge (1908–1935), English athlete
- Peter Gutteridge (1961–2014), New Zealand musician
- Reg Gutteridge (1924–2009), boxing journalist
- Rob Gutteridge (born 1954), Australian artist
- Tom Gutteridge (born 1952), British television producer

== See also ==
- Guttridge
- Kathleen Gutteridge, a character on the television program Coronation Street
