= James Reaney =

Canadian poet, playwright, librettist and professor

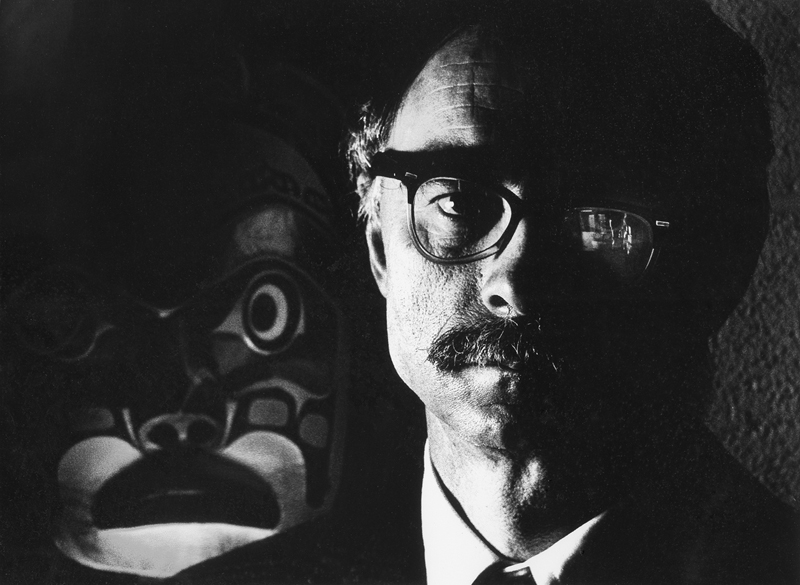
- Born: September 1, 1926; Easthope, Ontario, Canada
- Died: June 11, 2008; London, Ontario, Canada
- Occupations: Writer, artist, poet, playwright
- Spouse: Colleen Thibaudeau
- Children: James Stewart, John Andrew, Susan Alice Elizabeth
- Relatives: James Nesbitt Reaney, Elizabeth Henrietta Crear
- Writing career
- Language: English
- Notable works: Poems (1972), The Donnellys
- Notable awards: Order of Canada, FRSC, Governor General's Award
- Website: jamesreaney.com

James Crerar Reaney, OC FRSC (September 1, 1926 – June 11, 2008) was a Canadian poet, playwright, librettist, and professor, "whose works transform small-town Ontario life into the realm of dream and symbol." Reaney won Canada's highest literary award, the Governor General's Award, three times and received the Governor General's Awards for Poetry or Drama for both his poetry and his drama.

== Life ==
Reaney was born on a farm in Easthope near Stratford, Ontario to James Nesbitt Reaney and Elizabeth Henrietta Crerar. Almost all of Reaney's poems, stories, and plays are articulations of where he grew up. At a young age he was interested in theatre, and created a puppet show for children while in his early teens.

=== Poet and story writer ===
Reaney studied English at University College, University of Toronto, receiving his M.A. in 1949. The same year he also received the Governor General's Award, the first of three, at the age of 23, for his first book of poetry, Red Heart..

Reaney married fellow poet Colleen Thibaudeau on December 29, 1951 in St. Thomas. He has three children: two sons, James Stewart (born 1952) and John Andrew (1954), born in Toronto, Ontario and a daughter, Susan Alice Elizabeth, born 1959 in Winnipeg, Manitoba.

After teaching English at the University of Manitoba from 1949 until 1956, Reaney returned to the University of Toronto to complete a doctorate awarded in 1958; Northrop Frye was his thesis supervisor. Also in 1958 Reaney released a second book of poetry, A Suit of Nettles, which again won the Governor-General's Award.

During the 1940s and 1950s Reaney also wrote and published short stories. While not published in book form until years later, his stories were influential in establishing the style of writing later called Southern Ontario Gothic (later made world-famous by Alice Munro).

In 1960 Reaney began teaching in the University of Western Ontario's English Department. Also in 1960 he put out the first issue of his journal,Alphabet: A Semi-Annual Devoted to the Iconography of the Imagination, which he would edit until 1971. This journal published a variety of poets, including Jay Macpherson, Margaret Atwood, Al Purdy, Milton Acorn, and bp Nichol, and work from such artists as Tony Urquhart, and Greg Curnoe.

=== Playwright ===
For Reaney, the new decade also coincided with "a shift of emphasis from poetry to the public and communal form of drama," starting with The Killdeer. "Though he had been interested in drama since childhood, he was encouraged by a friend to write a piece for the University of Toronto's Alumnae Theatre and the work he created, The Killdeer, launched his drama career (and won a prize in the Dominion Drama Festival)." In 1962 he won the Governor General's Award for Poetry or Drama a third time, this time for both his newest book of poetry, Twelve Letters to a Small Town, and his first book of plays, The Killdeer and Other Plays.

Reaney "followed up The Killdeer with Colours in the Dark (1969), Listen to the Wind (1972), Masks of Childhood (1972) and plays for children." His play Colours in the Dark was produced at the Stratford Shakespeare Festival in 1967.

From 1973 to 1975 Reaney wrote the trilogy The Donnellys, which the Canadian Theatre Encyclopedia calls "one of the nation's most important dramas." The three plays debuted at Toronto's Tarragon Theatre, directed by Keith Turnbull. The St. Nicholas Hotel, Part II of the trilogy, won the Chalmers Award. The Donnellys toured nationally in 1975, from Halifax to Vancouver with the NDWT Theatre Company, again with Turnbull directing.

In 2023, the Blyth Festival produced all three plays in Reaney's The Donnelly Trilogy in repertory.

As well, Reaney coauthored several operas with musician John Beckwith, including Night-Blooming Cereus (1960), The Shivaree (1982), and Crazy To Kill (1988).

Other notable Reaney plays include Names and Nicknames, which premiered at the Manitoba Theatre Centre in 1963, directed by John Hirsch and Robert Sherrin); and Alice Through the Looking Glass, which played at the Stratford Festival in 1994, 1995 and in 2014.

In 2022, London Ontario's AlvegoRoot Theatre produced a new production of Reaney's 1981 play Gyroscope.

Reaney also enjoyed painting and drawing and his art works, from the 1940s to 1990s, were put on exhibit at the McMichael Canadian Art Collection in Kleinburg, Ontario in 2008.

Reaney died on June 11, 2008, in London, Ontario.

== Writing ==
Reaney's complex symbolic and poetic regional drama defies categorizing. Reaney's plays are a combination of symbol, metaphor, chant, poetic incantation, choral speaking, improvisation, miming, and child play. Reaney depends on the concept that we, the audience, are all "children of an older growth" and his audience have responded to this expectation. The symbolic quest as the children search for truth and end in reconciliation with the adult world are the basis of Reaney's plays. Critics have called him a colonial, a rationalist and internationalist, a rabid nationalist, a symbolist, and a poet with the myth of coherence who is yet able to say something in an age of the random.

Of his poetry, The Canadian Encyclopedia says: "Reaney's poetry, collected in Poems (1972), has earned him a reputation as an erudite poet at once deriving structures from metaphor, mythology, and a cosmopolitan literary tradition while deeply rooted in a regional sense of place."

Reaney's fiction of the 1940s and 1950s (collected in the 1994 book The Box Social and Other Stories, was "influential in establishing the style of writing that has since become known as ‘Southern Ontario Gothic’. Margaret Atwood has remarked that ‘without "The Bully", my fiction would have followed other paths'.... Playing sophisticated games by switching voice, he achieves a kind of ‘magic realism’, often through the distorted perspective and sense of disproportion of his child narrators."

== Awards ==
James Reaney won a number of awards in his lifetime:

- elected a Fellow of the Royal Society of Canada in 1978
- invested as an Officer of the Order of Canada in 1975)
- Governor General's Award for Poetry or Drama in 1949 for The Red Heart
- Governor General's Award for Poetry or Drama in 1958 for A Suit of Nettles.
- Governor General's Award for Poetry or Drama in 1962 for Twelve Letters to a Small Town and The Killdeer and Other Plays
- Honorary doctorates from Carleton University(1975), McMaster University(1979), Brock University(1991), and the University of Western Ontario(1992)
- Floyd S. Chalmers Canadian Play Award in 1975 for The St. Nicholas Hotel
- University of Alberta National Award in Letters for The Donnellys trilogy.

== Publications ==
=== Poetry ===
- The Red Heart. Toronto: McClelland & Stewart, 1949.
- A Suit of Nettles. Toronto: Macmillan, 1958. Porcupine's Quill, 2010. ISBN 0-88984-330-9
- Twelve Letters to a Small Town. Toronto: Ryerson, 1962.
- The Dance of Death at London, Ontario. London, Ont.: Alphabet, 1963.
- Poems. Toronto: New Press, 1972.
- Selected Shorter Poems Germaine Warkenton, ed. Erin, Ont.: Porcepic, 1975. ISBN 0-88878-063-X
- Selected Longer Poems. Germaine Warkenton ed. Erin, ON: Porcepic, 1976. ISBN 0-88878-090-7 ISBN 0888780915
- Imprecations: The Art of Swearing. Windsor, Ont.: Black Moss, 1984. ISBN 0-88753-123-7
- Performance: Poems. Goderich, Ont.: Moonstone, 1990. ISBN 0-920259-32-4
- Souwesto Home. Stan Dragland, ed. Brick Books, 2005. 9781894078436
- The Essential James Reaney. Brian Bartlett, ed. Porcupine's Quill, 2009).

=== Plays ===
- The Killdeer and Other Plays. Toronto: Macmillan, 1962.
- Names and Nicknames (1963) Vancouver: Talonbooks, 1978. ISBN 0-88922-154-5
- Geography Match (1967) Vancouver: Talonbooks, 1978. ISBN 0-88922-153-7
- Ignoramus (1967) Vancouver: Talonbooks, 1978. ISBN 0-88922-155-3
- Colours in the Dark (Talonbooks, 1969) ISBN 978-0-88922-001-0 | ISBN 0-88922-001-8
- Masks of Childhood. Toronto: New Press, 1972.
- Listen to the Wind. Vancouver: Talonbooks, 1972.
- Apple Butter and Other Plays for Children. Vancouver: Talonbooks, 1973. ISBN 0-88922-043-3
- Wacousta! Wingham, ON: Jubilee, 1974. Erin, ON: Porcépic, 1979. ISBN 0-88878-175-X
- Sticks and Stones: The Donnellys, Part I Erin, ON: Porcépic, 1975.
- Baldoon, with C.H. Gervais. Erin, ON: Porcupine's Quill, 1976. ISBN 978-0-88984-016-4
- The St. Nicholas Hotel, Wm. Donnelly, Prop: The Donnellys, Part II. Erin ON: Porcepic, 1976. ISBN 978-0-88878-050-8, ISBN 0-88878-051-6
- Handcuffs: The Donnellys, Part III. Erin, ON: Porcepic, 1977. ISBN 0-88878-052-4 ISBN 0888780532
- The Donnellys. Erin, ON: Porcepic, 1977. ISBN 0-88878-117-2
- The Plays of James Reaney. ECW Press, 1977. ISBN 978-0-920763-30-8
- The Dismissal, drama. Erin, ON: Press Porcépic/Beach Holme Publishers, 1978. ISBN 0-88878-147-4
- Gyroscope Toronto: Playwrights Canada Press, 1983. ISBN 0-88754-321-9
- King Whistle! (1980) — about the Stratford General Strike of 1933
- Plays of James Reaney. ECW Press, 1985. ISBN 978-9996512667
- Lewis Carroll's Alice Through the Looking Glass adapted for the stage. Erin, ON: Porcupine's Quill, 1994. ISBN 0-88984-147-0
- Scripts: Librettos for Operas and Other Musical Works, John Beckwith, ed. Toronto: Coach House Books, 2004. ISBN 978-1-55245-149-6
- Reaney Days in the West Room. (drama — 7 plays) David Ferry, ed. (Playwrights Canada Press, 2009)

=== Fiction ===
- "The Box Social," Liberty (Toronto), July 19, 1947.
- The Boy with an R in His Hand. Toronto: Macmillan, 1965. Erin, ON: Porcupine's Quill, 1980. ISBN 0-88984-031-8 Juvenile.
- Take the Big Picture. Erin, ON: Porcupine's Quill, 1986. ISBN 0-88984-087-3 Juvenile.
- The Box Social & Other Stories Erin, ON: Porcupine's Quill, 1996. ISBN 0-88984-173-X

=== Non-Fiction ===
- Halloween (Black Moss Press, 1976)
- 14 Barrels from Sea to Sea. Erin, ON: Press Porcepic, 1977. ISBN 0-88878-150-4, ISBN 0-88878-151-2

=== Edited ===
- Major Plays of the Canadian Theatre, 1934-1984. Irwin, 1984.
- Modern Canadian Plays. Talonbooks, 1985.

Except where noted, Bibliography from JamesReaney.com.

== Discography ==
- Celebration: Famous Canadian Poets CD, Canadian Poetry Association — 2001 ISBN 1-55253-022-1 (CD#4) (with F. R. Scott)
- Souwesto Words: 25 poets in Southwestern Ontario, Ergo Books, 2002.
  Poets on the CD are Penn Kemp, John Tyndall, Molly Peacock, Emily Chung, Paul Langille, Sheila Martindale, Roy McDonald, Sadiqa Khan, Jan Figurski, Jody Trevail, Beryl Baigent, John B. Lee, Cornelia Hoogland, James Reaney, Colleen Thibaudeau, Michael Wilson, Aimee O'Beirn, Jason Dickson, Marianne Micros, Skot Deeming, Victor Elias, David J. Paul, April Bulmer, Julie Berry, Don Gutteridge.
