= Roy McDonald (poet) =

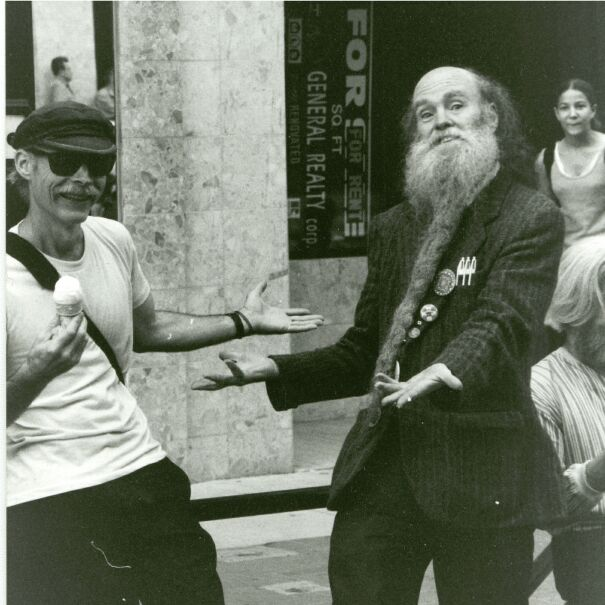
Wayne Morris and Roy McDonald at London New Arts Festival, 1999. London, Ontario.

Roy McDonald (4 June 1937 – 20 February 2018, approximation) was a poet, busker, author, philosopher and "professional conversationalist" in London, Ontario, Canada. He was well known for singing and reciting poetry in front of Joe Kool's Restaurant and Jim-Bob Ray's Bar on Richmond Street. For many years he stood at the northwest corner of Richmond and Dundas (the old centre of downtown London) and discussed the literary world with passersby. His long, grey beard, plastic bags filled with books and journals, tweed jacket, and habit of striking up friendly conversations with nearly everyone, making him a very recognizable and well-known figure around the city.

== Life and career ==
McDonald grew his beard for decades. He claimed his was the longest at the 1969 Woodstock Music and Art Fair. His clothes often fell into disrepair, and he occasionally mended his pants with duct tape. He decorated his jacket with buttons. He was often referred to as the unofficial Mayor of Richmond Row, a colourful segment of Richmond Street located in downtown London. Contrary to what some believe, McDonald did live in a house, a home on Wellington Road near Whetter Avenue, the same home he grew up in.

Roy spent most of his life in London, but he also spent time in Montreal, where he developed a problem with alcohol. He had the will to quit drinking and was completely sober from age 38 until his death. Pocketman (Dorset Publishing 1979) by Don Bell, is a book of comedy loosely based on Roy's time in Montreal. Also there is a song called Pocketman that was written in 1977, two years prior to the book, by Jeff Rogers-Wardle that describes the first encounter Jeff had with Roy.

== Death ==
McDonald was found dead in his home in London, Ontario on 21 February 2018, at the age of 80, after friends had reported to the police that they hadn't seen Roy around in a few weeks, so the exact date of his death is unknown. Even though McDonald had a zest for life, he was known to scoff at his own death. "If I die today," he once said, "I would die fulfilled."

== Publishing efforts ==
Ergo Productions published both of McDonald's books. Living: A London Journal is a detailed account of a week in McDonald's life, and The Answer Questioned is one long pun-poem. They can be found in the London Public Library and the UWO library, and are carried in some bookstores, including the one at UWO. In 2024, author Lynda Curnoe, who was close to McDonald and served as his archivist, published ‘Organizing Roy McDonald’, which recounts the process of turning his vast and chaotic literary estate into a coherent archive, along with his biography.

== Publications ==
- The Answer Questioned Ergo Books, Chapbook 1970 ISBN 0-920516-04-1
- Living: A London Journal Ergo Books, 1978 96 pages ISBN 0-920516-01-7

== Discography ==
- Souwesto Words: 25 poets in Southwestern Ontario Ergo Books 2002 Poets on the CD: Penn Kemp, John Tyndall, Molly Peacock, Emily Chung, Paul Langille, Sheila Martindale, Roy McDonald, Sadiqa Khan, Jan Figurski, Jody Trevail, Beryl Baigent, John B. Lee, Cornelia Hoogland, James Reaney, Colleen Thibaudeau, Michael Wilson, Aimee O'Beirn, Jason Dickson, Marianne Micros, Skot Deeming, Victor Elias, David J. Paul, April Bulmer, Julie Berry, Don Gutteridge.
- An Evening With Roy & Wayne Pete Matthews productions
- Roy & Wayne Live at Bean There Pete Matthews productions
- . " Richmond Row Sound System "Featuring Roy McDonald" Available on Bandcamp https://richmondrow.bandcamp.com

== Filmography ==
- The Roy Chronicles, by Grant Cushman (for public access television)
- Living On the Fringe, by Anna-Sophie Lunding
- The Last of the Hippies, by Rico Medina
- BEARD: A few moments in the life of Roy McDonald. A Play by Jason Rip 2000
- Portrait of an Artist, a student film by Ryan Furlong, University of Western Ontario 2003
- Roy, a student film by Josh Kish, Fanshawe College 2007

== See also ==
- List of Canadian poets
- List of Canadian writers

== Cited sources ==
- University of Western Ontario Archives
- the late Win Schell, Ergo Books, London
