= Cambodia: A Book for People Who Find Television Too Slow =

Short stories by Brian Fawcett

- First edition (publ. Talonbooks)
- Author: Brian Fawcett
- Genre: Short story collection
- Publisher: Talonbooks
- Publication date: February 18, 1986
- ISBN: 978-0-889-22237-3

Cambodia: A Book For People Who Find Television too Slow is a book of short stories by Brian Fawcett. It was first published in 1986 (with subsequent US publication: ISBN 0-8021-1082-7).

In addition to its unusual title, this collection of thirteen short stories and essays is notable also for having a division three quarters of the way down the page, above which appear the stories, below which appears an essay about Cambodia and the Khmer Rouge. Many of the stories and essays deal with the turbulence caused by modernization, colonialism, and multiculturalism. In his essays, Fawcett makes frequent references both to the short Joseph Conrad novel Heart of Darkness, and to the film Apocalypse Now. One of Fawcett's theses is that the societal desire to turn back the hands of time and expunge the traces of modernization is a root cause of genocide. The book also talks about Reggie Jackson.

The book was the basis of a one-actor play by the same name co-written with Ken Brown, who was the performer, and a multi-media performance project directed by Ken Brown in 1991 and staged in Edmonton, Alberta.
