= Jacques Ferron =

Canadian physician and author

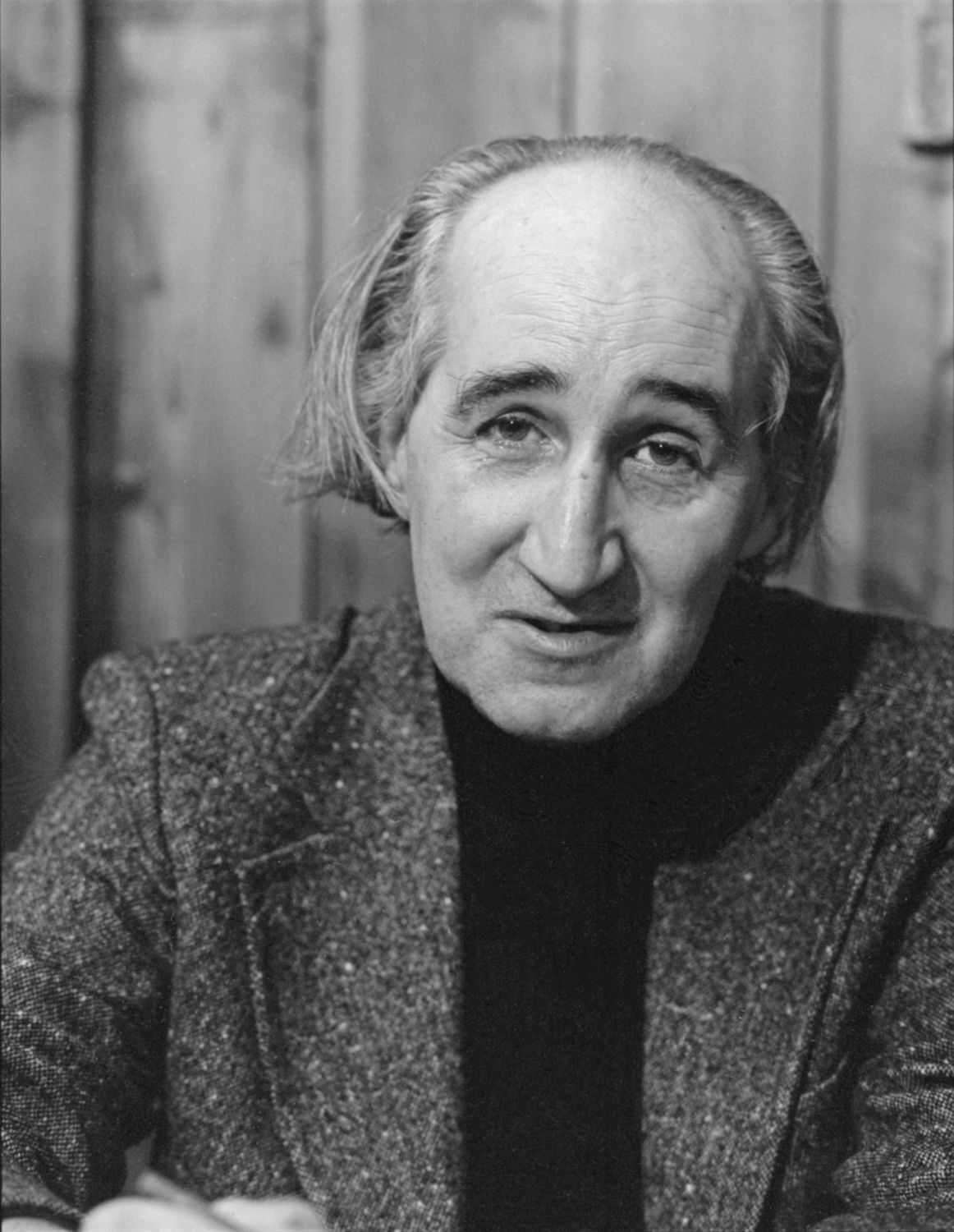
- Jacques Ferron in 1977
- Born: January 20, 1921; Louiseville, Quebec, Canada
- Died: April 22, 1985 (aged 64); Saint-Lambert, Quebec
- Occupation: writer

Jacques Ferron (January 20, 1921 – April 22, 1985) was a Canadian physician and author.

Jacques Ferron was born in Louiseville, Quebec, the son of Joseph-Alphonse Ferron and Adrienne Caron. On March 5, 1931, his mother died. He attended Collège Jean-de-Brébeuf but was expelled in 1936. He continued his education at Collège Saint-Laurent and then was readmitted at Jean-de-Brébeuf, only to be expelled again. In September 1941, he was accepted at Université Laval where he studied medicine and on July 22, 1943, he married a fellow student, Madeleine Therrien, whom he divorced in 1949.

On November 1943, he enrolled in the Canadian army as a medic and received the acceptance in June 1945. He trained in British Columbia and Ontario and after that was sent to Quebec and New Brunswick as a medic. When relieved of duty in 1946, he settled in Rivière-Madeleine, Quebec. His time in Gaspésie was the inspiration for many of his stories written later. He may have had to leave Rivière-Madeleine because he was denounced from the pulpit as a communist by the local parish priest. In 1947, his father died.

In 1948, he returned to Montréal. In 1949, he moved to Longueuil, Quebec and his first book, L'ogre, was published. He lived among working-class people that lived in Longueuil-annexe in those years, often offering his services for free-refusing to be paid, or omitting to ask. Not in the name of charity, but rather of solidarity- his giving was politically motivated, and he understood that his training as a doctor-his privilege- was paid for by the misery that the francophone working class was experiencing at that time.

In 1951, he began a 30-year collaboration with L'Information médicale et paramédicale. On June 28, 1952, he married Madeleine Lavallée. In 1954, he became a member of the board of the Canadian Peace Congress. In 1959, he helped in the foundation of the magazine Situations. In 1960, with the help of Raoul Roy, he created l'Action socialiste pour l'indépendance du Québec.

In 1962, he received the Governor General's Award for French fiction for his book Contes du pays incertain.

Ferron was a candidate for the CCF in the 1958 federal election in the Longueuil district. He finished third with 6.8% of the vote. In 1963, he founded the Parti Rhinocéros, which he described as "an intellectual guerrilla party". He also began to write for the magazine Parti pris. He also ran for the RIN in the district of Taillon in the 1966 provincial election and outperformed other candidates of the same party, finishing third with a score of 18.3%. In 1969, he became a member of the Parti Québécois.

In 1977, the Quebec government awarded him the Prix Athanase-David. He was named an honorary member of the Union des écrivains québécois in 1981.

He died of a heart attack 1985 at his home in St-Lambert, Quebec, aged 64.

His life was dramatized by playwright Michèle Magny in her 2004 play Un carré de ciel.
