= Kildare Dobbs =

Canadian writer

Kildare Robert Eric Dobbs CM OOnt (10 October 1923 – 1 April 2013) was a Canadian short story and travel writer.

Born in Meerut, Uttar Pradesh, India, he was educated in Ireland and later spent 5 years in the Royal Navy during the Second World War. After the war he worked in the British Colonial Service in Tanganyika. Dobbs came to Canada in 1952 and became a teacher, editor for Macmillan of Canada, managing editor of Saturday Night, and book editor of The Toronto Star Weekly.

In 2000, he was awarded the Order of Ontario. Dobbs lived in Toronto with his wife, Linda Kooluris Dobbs, a noted portrait artist, painter and photographer. In 2013, shortly before his death at age 89 following a period of ill health, Dobbs received the Order of Canada from the Right Honourable David Johnston, at his home in Toronto. He was cremated and his remains interred in the family grave in St Mary's (Church of Ireland) churchyard in Castlecomer, Co Kilkenny, Ireland.

== Bibliography ==
- Running to Paradise – 1962 (winner of the 1962 Governor General's Award for Fiction)
- Reading the Time – 1968
- Canada 1964 1965
- The Great Fur Opera – 1970 (Dobson/McClelland and Stewart, ISBN 978-0-234-77609-4)
- Pride and Fall: A Novella and Six Stories – 1981 (Clarke, Irwin, ISBN 978-0-7720-1368-2)
- Historic Canada – 1984 (Methuen, ISBN 978-0-458-98530-2)
- Coastal Canada – 1985
- Anatolian Suite: Travels and Discursions in Turkey – 1989 (Little, Brown & Co., ISBN 978-0-316-18779-4)
- Ribbon of Highway: By Bus Along the Trans-Canada – 1991 (Little, Brown & Co., ISBN 978-0-316-18784-8)
- Smiles and Chukkers & Other Vanities – 1994 (Little, Brown & Co., ISBN 978-0-316-18776-3)
- The Eleventh Hour: Poems for the Third Millennium – 1997 (Mosaic, ISBN 978-0-88962-637-9)
- Casablanca: The Poem – 1999 (Ekstasis Editions, ISBN 978-1-896860-58-9)
- Running the Rapids:A Writer's Life – 2005 (Dundurn, ISBN 978-1-55002-594-1)
- "Casanova in Venice: A Raunchy Rhyme" with nine original wood engravings by Wesley W. Bates- 2010 (Porcupine's Quill, ISBN 978-0-88984-332-5)
