= M. A. C. Farrant =

Canadian short fiction writer and journalist

Marion Alice Coburn Farrant (born April 5, 1947) is a Canadian short fiction writer and journalist. She lives in North Saanich, British Columbia.

== Career ==
Farrant has written fiction, non-fiction, and a memoir, as well as book reviews and essays for the Vancouver Sun and the Globe & Mail. Her memoir, My Turquoise Years, which she adapted for the stage, premiered April 4–May 4, 2013 at the Arts Club Theatre's Granville Island Stage in Vancouver. Her novel, The Strange Truth About Us – A Novel of Absence, was chosen by The Globe & Mail as one of the Best Books of 2012. The World Afloat – Miniatures, a collection of very short fiction, was published by Talonbooks in the spring of 2014 and won the City of Victoria Book Butler Book Prize for that year.

She has taught writing at the University of Victoria, the Victoria School of Writing, the Banff Centre for the Arts, and was Writer-In-Residence at Macquarie University in Sydney, Australia.

== Bibliography ==
- Jigsaw: A Puzzle in Ninety-Nine Pieces, Non-fiction/humor, Fall 2023, Talonbooks, ISBN 9781772015430 (paperback)
- The Great Happiness-miniatures, Fiction, Spring 2019, Talonbooks
- The Days-Forecasts, Warnings, Advice, Fiction, Fall 2016, Talonbooks, ISBN 978-1-77201-007-7 (paperback); ISBN 978-1-77201-009-1 (kindle); ISBN 978-1-77201-010-7 (pdf)
- The World Afloat, Talonbooks, Spring, 2014, ISBN 978-088922-838-2, e-book available April 1, 2014
- The Strange Truth About Us – a novel of absence, Talonbooks, October, 2011, 216 pages, ISBN 978-0-88922-668-5; e-publication, 2012; audio book, Recorded Books, USA, Maple Leaf Series, 2013. Narrator: Tandy Cronin
- Down the Road to Eternity—New & Selected Fiction, Talonbooks, 285 pages, Fall, 2009, ISBN 978-0-88922-615-9; e-publication, 2013; audio book, Audible, USA, 2012. Narrator: Karyn O'Bryant
- The Secret Lives of Litterbugs, Non-fiction/humour, Key Porter Books, 230 pages, Spring, 2009; E-publication, Pacific Place Publishing, 2011; Kindle/Amazon.Com, 2011; audio book, Audible, USA, 2012. Narrator: Erin Moon
- The Breakdown So Far, Short Fiction, Talonbooks, Vancouver, B.C., 2007, ISBN 978-0-88922-556-5, 160 pages
- My Turquoise Years, Non-fiction/Memoir, Greystone/Douglas & McIntyre, Vancouver, B.C. 2004, ISBN 1-55365-037-9, 186 pages, Canada & U.S; E-publication, Greystone/Douglas & McIntyre, Spring 2011; audio book, Audible, USA, 2012. Narrator: Erin Moon
- Darwin Alone In The Universe; Short fiction, Talonbooks, Vancouver B.C., 2003, ISBN 0-88922-471-4, 160 pages, e-publication 2012
- Girls Around The House, Linked stories, (Polestar Book Publishers/Raincoast) 1999, Victoria & Vancouver, 156 pages ISBN 1-896095-93-3; e-published Pacific Place Publishing, 2011; audio book, Audible, USA, 2012. Narrator: Justine Eyre
- Gifts, Short fiction, Hawthorne Society by Reference West, Victoria, November 1999, 24 pages limited edition, 150 copies, ISBN 1-894010-42-6,
- What's True, Darling, Short fiction, Polestar Book Publishers/Raincoast, 1997, Vancouver & Victoria B.C., 181 pages ISBN 1-896095-28-3,
- Word of Mouth, Novella & Short Fiction Short fiction, Thistledown Press, 1996, Saskatoon, Saskatchewan, 136 pages, ISBN 1-895449-60-X,
- Altered Statements, Short fiction, Arsenal Pulp Press, Vancouver, B.C., 1995, 144 pgs, ISBN 1-55152-019-2,
- Raw Material, Short fiction, Arsenal Pulp Press, 1993, Vancouver, B.C., 136 pgs, ISBN 0-88978-262-8,
- Sick Pigeon, Short fiction, Thistledown Press, 1991, Saskatoon, Saskatchewan, 96 pgs, ISBN 0-920633-83-8,

=== Anthologies ===
- A Rewording Life – Finding Meaning, Alzheimers Fundraising anthology, Sheryl Gordon, Editor, Fall, 2015
- K1N, Issue 5, 2014.06, L'Ecole de Dressage, Translated by Annick Geoffroy-Skuce
- 50 Poems for Gordon Lightfoot, Leacock Museum, Orillia, Ontario, Anthology, November 2014, "Postcards"
- Imaginarium 2013, Best Canadian Specultive Fiction, ChiZine pub, Three stories from Geist, Toronto, 2013
- 111 West Coast Portraits, Photographs by Barry Peterson & Blaise Enright, Mother Tongue Press, October, 2012, "Author Interview"
- Framing the Garden, Art & Words, Linda Rogers, Editor, Ekstasis Editions, December, 2011
- Slice Me Some Truth, Non-fiction, Luanne Armstrong & Zoe Landale, Editors, Wolsak & Wynn, Fall, 2011
- ditch, anthology 2 (Canadian women innovative poets), Trainwreck Press,
- St Johns, NFLD, 160 pages, published online, "Point Ten"
- Wordscapes Youth Arts Journal, Ripple Effect Arts and Literature Society (REAL); distributed to high schools in British Columbia; "Jane and Mr. Leaky", 2008
- Imagining Place, BC Federation of Writers Anthology, Anvil Press, Daniel Francis, Editor, May, 2008, "The Secret Lives of Litterbugs"
- Apples Under the Bed, Hedgerow Press, Fall 2007; "Baked Salmon"
- Penguin Anthology of Canadian Humour, Will Ferguson, Editor, "The Heartspeak Wellness Retreat", March, 2006, ISBN 0-670-06443-2
- This I Know, Dropped Threads, #3, Random House Canada, Editor, Marjorie Anderson, April 2006, "The Gospel According to Elsie", ISBN 0-67931-385-0
- bill bissett Tribute Anthology, "A Universe Runs Through Him", Nightwood Editions, Spring 2006
- George Bowering Birthday Anthology, Coach House Press, 2006, "Happy Birthday", December 2005-
- White Gloves of the Doorman, Anthology on the work of Leon Rooke, edited by Branko Gorgup, 2004, Exile Editions, Toronto; commissioned piece, "Fat Leon". ISBN 1-55096-611-1
- Reading the Peninsula, ed by Sara Dowse, 2003 (Arts Council of the Saanich Peninsula), Sidney B.C., Skidney ISBN 0-9733471-0-4
- Listening with the Ear of the Heart, Edited by Dave Margoshes, August 2003, (St Peter's Press, Sask,) The Mirror, ISBN 1-896971-24-5
- Ripple Effect Press, All Wound Up: Alternative Writing from British Columbia, 2002, Vancouver B.C. ISBN 1-894735-04-8, Darwin Alone in the Universe, Jane and Mr. Leakey
- Neuvo Argomenti, edited by Branko Gorgup, Rome, Italy, Special edition of English Canadian Writing, in translation, Summer 2001, ISBN 88-04-48950-2, Starring Lotta Hitchmanova
- And Other Stories, edited by George Bowering, Talon, Vancouver B.C. Spring/Summer 2001, Vancouver B.C. ISBN 9780889224513, Studies Show/Experts Say
- Exact Fare Only—Good, Bad & Ugly Rides on Public Transportation, edited by Grant Buday, Anvil Press, February 1, 2001, ISBN 1-895636-29-9, Vancouver B.C. Gifts
- Tesseracts 7, Speculative Fiction, edited by Paula Johanson & Jean-Louis Trudel, Tesseracts Books, Edmonton, title story Altered Statements from the book Altered Statements, 1998, ISBN
- The Concrete Forest, Urban fiction, edited by Hal Niedviecki, McClelland & Stewart, Toronto, title story Altered Statements from the book Altered Statements, April 1998, ISBN
- Moosehead Anthology of Postcard Fiction, edited by Robert Allen, DC Books, Montreal, "Happy Birthday" & "bed", Spring 1997, ISBN 0-919688-37-3
- What Is Already Known, Thistledown Press Ltd. 20th Anniversary Anthology, edited by Sean Virgo, "Stealing George" from Sick Pigeon ISBN 1-895449-53-7, Fall 1995
- On Spec: The First Five Years, (Books Collective: Copper Pig Writer's Society & Tesseracts Books), "Fish", ISBN 1-895836-12-3, Spring 1995
- Witness to Wilderness: The Clayoquot Sound Anthology, (Arsenal Pulp Press), "Fish", ISBN 1-55152-009-5, 1994
- Going Down Swinging, Australia, Annual Anthology, Selected Fiction, ISSN 0157-3950, 1993
- Snapshots: The New Canadian Fiction, (Black Moss Press), Selected fiction, ISBN 978-0-88753-256-6. 1992
- Going Down Swinging, Australia, (Hit And Miss Publications), Environmental Issues, "Fish", ISSN 0157-3950, 1992

=== Chapbooks ===
- Farfield Press, 2003
- Farfield Press, 2002
- Far Field Press, Anthology, ed Allan Brown, 2001, Skidney
- fingerprinting inkoperated, "Diana Ross In Wax", April 1997
- fingerprinting inkoperated, "Three" - Memorial to David UU", originally to be published as "Three" by The Berkeley Horse, #55, October 1994; released May 1995.
- fingerprinting inkoperated, "M A C", Montreal, Quebec, 1992
- The Berkeley Horse, (Silver Birch Press), "Poor Norman", No 32, 1991
- The Berkeley Horse, (Silver Birch Press), "childless", No 28, 1990
- The Berkeley Horse, (Silver Birch Press), "Raw Material", No 18, 1989
