= Brian Fawcett =

Canadian writer and cultural analyst (1944–2022)

- Born: May 13, 1944; Prince George, British Columbia, Canada
- Died: February 27, 2022 (aged 77); Toronto, Ontario, Canada
- Education: Simon Fraser University
- Occupations: writer, cultural analyst
- Spouses: Sharon Thesen (m. 1966, divorced): Leanna Crouch
- Partner: Fran Piccaluga
- Children: 3
- Awards: Pearson Writers' Trust Non-Fiction Prize (2003)

Brian Fawcett (May 13, 1944 – February 27, 2022) was a Canadian writer and cultural analyst. He was awarded the Pearson Writers' Trust Non-Fiction Prize in 2003 for his book Virtual Clearcut, or The Way Things Are in My Hometown. He was also nominated for the Lieutenant Governor's Award for Literary Excellence in 2012 for Human Happiness.

== Early life ==
Fawcett was born in Prince George, British Columbia, on May 13, 1944. His father, Hartley, was a soft drink salesman in Alberta who moved to Prince George during the late 1930s to establish his own company; his mother was Rita Surry. Fawcett initially went to Connaught Junior High School in his hometown, before attending Prince George Senior High School. After working in the forest service for three years, he relocated to Vancouver at the age of 22 to study at the newly-formed Simon Fraser University (SFU). There, he was taught by R. Murray Schafer and Robin Blaser, who influenced his writings. Fawcett graduated with a Bachelor of Arts in 1969 and was a Woodrow Wilson Fellow for the 1969–1970 academic year. Before becoming a full-time writer, he worked as an urban planner and community organizer in Metro Vancouver until 1985. He also taught English to inmates in Matsqui Institution.

== Career ==
Fawcett established a small magazine at SFU named NMFG (an acronym for "No Money From Government"). He utilized the pen name Gordon Lockhead to edit the periodical, which was issued from February 1976 until September 1978. He authored seven books of poetry during this time. He later published his first collection of short stories in 1982, titled My Career with the Leafs and Other Stories, in which he recounted childhood memories of growing up in Prince George.

Fawcett ultimately published over 20 books of fiction, non-fiction, and poetry. One of these works, Cambodia: A Book for People Who Find Television Too Slow (1986), which gave an account of the Khmer Rouge and the Cambodian genocide, received recognition across Canada. In another collection of short stories titled Capital Tales (1984), he delved into violence and a variety of storytelling techniques. The Secret Journal of Alexander Mackenzie, released one year later, analyzed the misuse of the remote areas of British Columbia in a fictional setting, as well as recognizing the "global village" invasion from a psychological and economic perspective. Fawcett also authored a column in The Globe and Mail focusing on political and cultural affairs. After residing in Vancouver for around a quarter of a century, he relocated to Toronto and co-founded the website www.dooneyscafe.com in 2001, together with Stan Persky. Named after a restaurant on Toronto's Bloor Street West, the site is described as "a news service" and to which he was a regular contributor. He also taught cultural literacy in maximum security prisons. His book Virtual Clearcut: Or, the Way Things Are in My Hometown won the Pearson Writers' Trust Non-Fiction Prize in 2003, (Note: The award was later renamed in 2011, when Hilary Weston began sponsoring the Writers' Trust Prize.) with Fawcett receiving C$15,000 as a result.

Human Happiness was published in 2012 and was nominated for the Lieutenant Governor's Award for Literary Excellence. Fawcett released his final major book the following year, titled The Last of the Lumbermen. It detailed a celebrated hockey team in Prince George during the 1950s and 1960s, and became one of his most eminent works. Fawcett was working on two books at the time of his death in 2022, which are scheduled to be published posthumously.

== Personal life ==
Fawcett married his first wife, Sharon Thesen, in October 1966. They were high school sweethearts and later studied at SFU together. Together, they had one child, Jesse. They separated in 1972, and eventually divorced. After moving to Toronto, Fawcett married Leanna Crouch, who was a producer of Imprint. Together, they had one daughter, Hartlea. He was later in a domestic partnership with Fran Piccaluga until his death. He had another child, Max.

Fawcett died on February 27, 2022, in Toronto, at age 77, after suffering from idiopathic pulmonary fibrosis for four years.

== Bibliography ==
=== Fiction ===
- The Opening: Prince George, Finally (1974)
- My Career with the Leafs and Other Stories (1982) ISBN 9780889221994
- Capital Tales (1984) ISBN 9780889222212
- The Secret Journal of Alexander Mackenzie (1985) ISBN 9780889222274
- Cambodia: A Book for People Who Find Television Too Slow (1986) ISBN 9780889222373
- Public Eye: An Investigation Into the Disappearance of the World (1990) ISBN 9780802111425
- Gender Wars: A Novel and Some Conversation About Sex and Gender (1994) ISBN 9781895897098
- The Last of the Lumbermen (2013) ISBN 9781770862876
- A Blue Spruce Christmas (2010) ISBN 9781897151945

=== Poetry ===
- Five Books of a Northmanual (1971)
- Friends (1971)
- Permanent Relationships (1975) ISBN 9780889101647
- The Second Life (1976)
- Creatures of State (1977) ISBN 9780889221338
- Tristram's Book (1981)
- Aggressive Transport (1982)

=== Non-fiction ===
- Unusual Circumstances, Interesting Times and Other Impolite Interventions (1991) ISBN 9780921586272
- The Compact Garden: Discovering the Pleasures of Planting in a Small Space (1992) ISBN 9780921820437
- The Disbeliever's Dictionary: A Completely Disrespectful Lexicon of Canada Today (1997) ISBN 9781894042109
- Virtual Clearcut, or The Way Things Are in My Hometown (2003)
- Local Matters: A Defence of Dooney's Café and other Non-Globalized Places, People, and Ideas (2003)
- Human Happiness (2011)
