= 1962 Governor General's Awards =

Canadian literary award

Each winner of the 1962 Governor General's Awards for Literary Merit was selected by a panel of judges administered by the Canada Council for the Arts.

== Winners ==
=== English Language ===
- Fiction: Kildare Dobbs, Running to Paradise.
- Poetry or Drama: James Reaney, Twelve Letters to a Small Town and The Killdeer and Other Plays.
- Non-Fiction: Marshall McLuhan, The Gutenberg Galaxy.

=== French Language ===
- Fiction: Jacques Ferron, Contes du pays incertain.
- Poetry or Drama: Jacques Languirand, Les insolites and Les violons de l'automne.
- Non-Fiction: Gilles Marcotte, Une littérature qui se fait.
