= Guttridge =

Guttridge is a surname. Notable people with the surname include:

- Bill Guttridge (1931–2013), English footballer and manager
- Darcy Guttridge (born 1999), Australian rules footballer
- Frank Guttridge (1866–1918), English cricketer and footballer
- Leonard Guttridge (1918–2009), English historian and author
- Luke Guttridge (born 1982), English footballer
- Peter Guttridge, English writer

== See also ==
- Gutteridge
