= Susan McMaster =

Canadian poet

Susan McMaster (born 1950) is a Canadian poet, literary editor, performance poet, and former president of the League of Canadian Poets (2011–12).

== Early life and education ==
McMaster came to Ottawa with her family in 1955 and attended First Avenue Public School, Elmdale, Connaught, Lisgar Collegiate (1966), Carleton University (B.A. in English, 1970; graduate studies in journalism), and Ottawa Teachers' College (elementary certificate, 1971).

== Editing career ==
While she taught for a few years, McMaster has spent most of her paid working career as an editor, notably at the National Gallery of Canada from 1989 to 2008 as an editor of some 40 art catalogues and founder of the Gallery magazine Vernissage.

McMaster was the founding editor of the feminist and art magazine Branching Out (1973–1975).

McMaster is a member of the League of Canadian Poets, The Writers' Union of Canada, the Writers' Federation of Nova Scotia, PEN (Canada), the Writers' Trust, SOCAN, Access copyright, and the Religious Society of Friends (Quakers).

== Personal life ==
McMaster lives in Ottawa, Ontario. She and her husband Ian spend part of each summer at their cottage in Nova Scotia on the Bay of Fundy. They have two grown daughters, Morel and Aven, and three grandchildren.

== Works ==
=== Selected publications ===
- Branching Out Magazine (first Canadian feminist and arts periodical), founding editor. Edmonton, 1973–75, editor 1975–80 Sharon Batt.
- Pass this way again (with Andrew McClure and Claude Dupuis, 1983). (Underwhich Editions, 1983).
- Dark Galaxies. (Ouroboros, 1986).
- North/South (with Andrew McClure and Colin Morton). (Underwhich Editions, 1987).
- Dangerous Graces: Women's Poetry on Stage (editor). (Balmuir Publishing, 1987).
- Wordmusic (audiotape, with Andrew McClure and Colin Morton, and Paula Quick, Lynne Simpson, and Yasmine Malinowski from Open Score). (First Draft, 1986). Reissued with additional tracks by Penn Kemp, Max Middle, and Linsey Wellman as 1981 Wordmusic 2007.
- The Hummingbird Murders. (Quarry Press, 1992). ISBN 1-55082-048-6.
- Learning to Ride. (Quarry Press, 1994). ISBN 1-55082-104-0.
- Dangerous Times. (audiotape, with SugarBeat Music & Poetry, 1996).
- Uncommon Prayer. (Quarry Press, 1997). ISBN 1-55082-196-2.
- Siolence: Poets on Women, Violence and Silence (editor). (Quarry Press, 1997).
- SugarBeat Music & Poetry. (CD, with Alrick Huebener and Jennifer Giles). (SugarBeat Music & Poetry, 1998).
- Geode Music & Poetry. (CD, with AH and JG, and Geode Music & Poetry, 2000). ISBN 0-9687191-0-4.
- Waging Peace: Poetry and Political Action, editor. (Penumbra Press, 2002). ISBN 1-894131-37-1.
- La Deriva del Pianeta/World Shift, translations into Italian by Ada Donati. (Schifanoia Editore, 2003). ISBN 88-87882-30-4.
- Until the Light Bends (Black Moss, 2004). Finalist: Ottawa Book Awards; Lampman-Scott Award. ISBN 0-88753-397-3.
- Until the Light Bends: Geode Music & Poetry. (CD, with AH and JG Pendas Productions, 2004). ISBN 0-920820-70-0.
- The Gargoyle's Left Ear: Writing in Ottawa. (Black Moss, 2007). ISBN 978-0-88753-443-0
- Crossing Arcs: Alzheimer's, My Mother, and Me. (Black Moss, 2009, 2d printing 2010). Finalist: Acorn-Plantos Peoples' Poetry Award; Ottawa Book Awards; Archibald Lampman Award for Poetry. ISBN 978-0-88753-462-1
- Paper Affair: Poems Selected & New. (Black Moss, 2010). ISBN 978-0-88753-468-3
- Pith & Wry: Canadian Poetry, editor. (Scrivener Press, 2010). ISBN 978-1-896350-41-7.

=== Selected anthologies ===
- Celebrating Canadian Women. Ed. Greta Hofmann Nemiroff (Fitzhenry & Whiteside, 1989).
- A Room at the Heart of Things. Ed. Elisabeth Harvor (Vehicle, 1999).
- Crossing Boundaries: An International Anthology of Women's Experiences in Sport. Eds. Susan J. Bandy, Anne S. Darden. (Human Kinetics, 1999).
- Line by Line: An Anthology of Canadian Poetry. Ed. and with drawings by Heather Spears (Ekstasis Editions, 2002).
- Nth. Eds. Carolyn Creed, Fred Wah (Sage Hill Fall Poetry Colloquium, 2003).
- The Lunar Plexus. Aut. Penn Kemp (PsychoSpace Sounds, Pendas Productions, 2002). ISBN 1-894715-01-2.
- Two Lips. Aut. Penn Kemp (PsychoSpace Sounds, Pendas Productions, 2001). ISBN 0-920820-35-2.
- Re:Generations: Canadian Women Poets in Conversation. Eds. Barbara Godard, Di Brandt (Black Moss Press, 2005). ISBN 0-88753-393-0.

== See also ==
- List of Canadian poets
