= Colours in the Dark =

Colours in the Dark is a play by James Reaney. It was produced by the Stratford Festival in 1967 and the Vancouver Playhouse in 1969. It was produced by the University of Calgary in 1972.

Colours in the Dark was published by Talonbooks in 1969.
