= Branching Out (magazine) =

Canadian feminist magazine

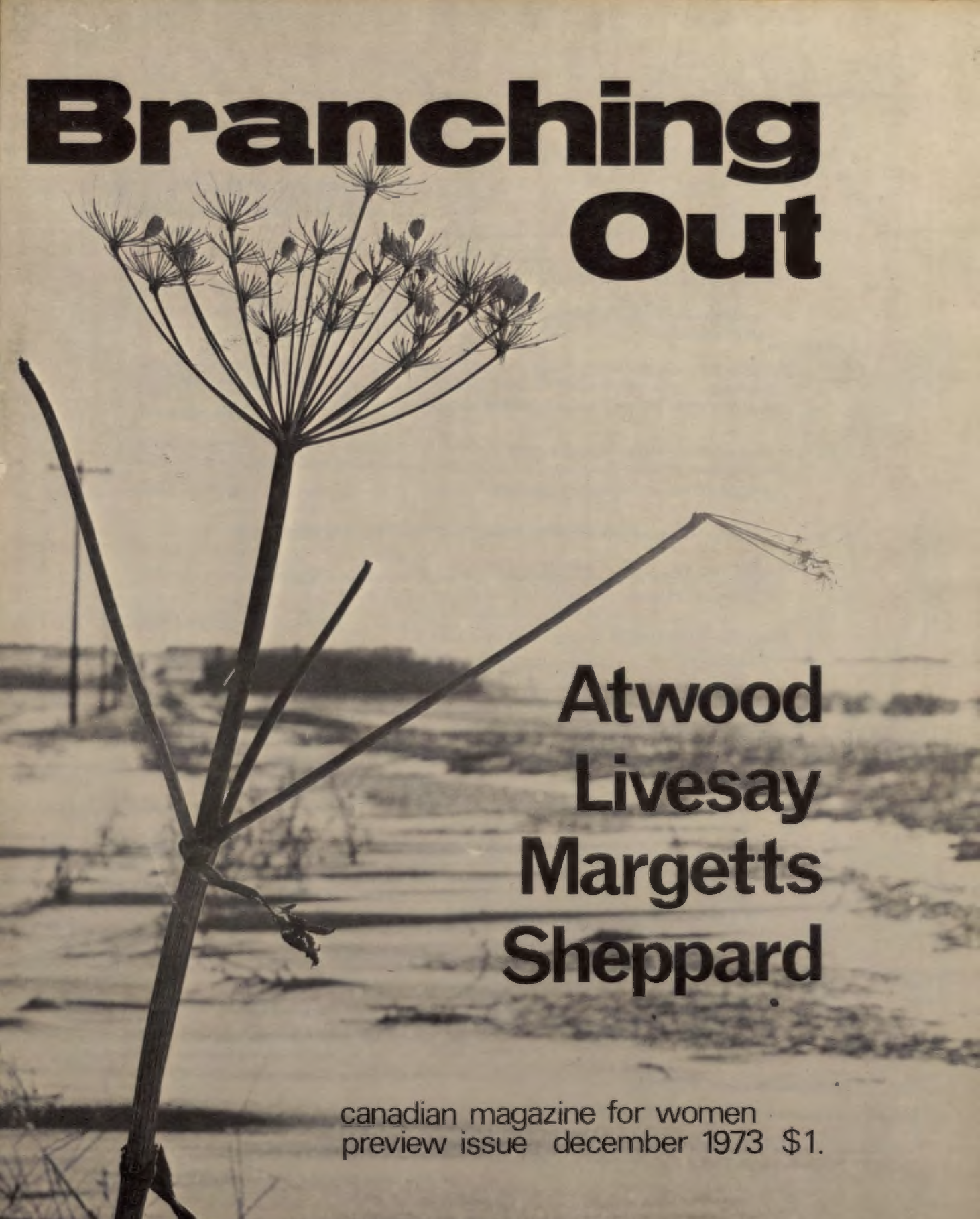
- Founder: Susan McMaster
- Founded: 1972
- Based in: Edmonton, Alberta Canada
- Language: English
- ISSN: 0382-5264

Branching Out is a Canadian magazine created by Susan McMaster in 1972 and published by the New Women's Magazine Society. It aligns with the second wave feminist movement. Its mission was to provide a platform for female intellectual and artistic production. It is part of the women in print movement, which contributed to women's liberation. The periodical received support from the Alberta Law Foundation and featured advertisements for the Alberta Women's Bureau, a government organization. At its height, the magazine had about 2500 subscribers with 1500 retail copies distributed per issue which was a significant feat for Canadian alternative press at the time. In 2019, "University of Alberta doctoral student Tessa Jordan," published the book Feminist Acts: Branching Out Magazine and the Making of Canadian Feminism, contributing to Branching Out's notability as a significant entity in Canadian feminist studies. The magazine is also a part of the Alberta Women's Memory Project.

== Context ==
In the 1960s, Western feminist movements began to integrate into popular culture. The awareness of issues raised by second-wave feminism, such as occupational inequality, access to abortion and pay equity, found its way into mainstream women's magazines. Feminist organizations used these periodicals to convey their ideals and reach a broader audience, including those in rural areas.

Many feminist periodicals were independently produced and published. The writing of their content mainly relied on contributions from activists who worked voluntarily. By the late 1960s, over three hundred newspapers were reported in circulation, a number that continued to grow until the early 1990s. Periodicals allowed feminists to constantly reassess their goals and evaluate the effectiveness of their mobilization efforts.

This editorial momentum which started in North America, is now called the Women's Print Movement or Women in Print. This movement's participation was significant for the visibility and democratization of second-wave feminist issues, notably in Canada with the Royal Commission on the Status of Women.

== History ==
In 1973 in Edmonton, Susan McMaster launched an exclusively female cultural magazine project by publishing a recruitment ad in The Gateway magazine. Respondents quickly formed the collective that produced the first issue of Branching Out. Women participated in the editorial process according to their talents and interests. A total of thirty-one issues were published between 1973 and 1980. The magazine survived on reader donations, though this financial support was insufficient to pay the collective's members. In 1975, Susan McMaster left the magazine, and Sharon Batt took over. The periodical received partial funding from the Alberta Law Foundation in 1976 and used its columns to educate its readers about legal matters. This educational focus was also evident in its editorials, which regularly covered topics ranging from personal liberation to stereotypes associated with feminism.

In 1977, after a four-month hiatus due to financial problems, the magazine reorganized its content around a monthly theme. The last issue was published in 1980 when financial difficulties became too overwhelming. Some issues featured contributions from iconic figures of the Canadian women's liberation movement, such as Margaret Atwood, Margaret Laurence, Alice Munro, and Dorothy Livesay.

With a circulation of four thousand copies, Branching Out was a rival to the Canadian feminist magazine Chatelaine during its years of publication.

== Mandate and positions ==
Branching Out distinguished itself from other periodicals in the 'Women in Print movement' through its aesthetic philosophy and content orientation. The magazine focused on women's cultural and creative production in the arts and politics. As such, it served as a mediator between more radical feminist manifestos and magazines with popular content.

The magazine published, among other things, interviews with athletes, journalists, and artists, as well as literary and film reviews. The content was always written by and for women. In this regard, Branching Out sought to distinguish itself from mainstream press, where intellectual and cultural space was primarily reserved for men.

The magazine also had an inclusion policy; the selection of texts submitted by readers did not consider the race or sexual orientation of the author.

== Origin of the name ==
The editorial of the first issue noted that the name Branching Out symbolically refers to a flower stem that breaks away from the ground to rise above its initial roots. By extension, the magazine also sough to move away from the initial foundations of radical feminism to create a culture that reinterprets life and human experiences from a female perspective.

== Reactions in the media ==
Media responses to the Women in Print movement were varied. Several major newspapers caricatured women and their egalitarian concerns to discredit them. The same was true for many alternative newspapers, whose anti-feminist rhetoric permeated the editorial content. In response, several periodicals were boycotted by calls from various feminist organizations. Women were often relegated to subordinate roles within press companies. In 1970, the creation of the American Woman in Media Group was met with hostility and little support from predominantly male companies. However, women working in mixed alternative presses quickly used their acquired expertise to bolster the ranks of the many editorial associations formed during the Women in Print movement.

== First issue staff and authors ==
Staff	Role (staff)
Susan McMaster	Coordinating Editor
Sonja Chandra	Fiction
Roberta Kalechofsky	Fiction
Susan McMaster	Fiction
Helene Rosta	Fiction
Meg Shatilla	Fiction
Sharon Batt	Non-fiction
Mary Alyce Heaton	Non-fiction
Roberta Kalechofsky	Non-fiction
Naomi Loeb	Non-fiction
Susan McMaster	Non-fiction
Meg Shatilla	Non-fiction
Alice Baumann-Rondez	Art
Iona MacAllister	Art
Alice Baumann-Rondez	Production
Ghislaine Campbell	Production
Iona MacAllister	Production
Janice Riddell	Production
Maureen Scobie	Production
Sharon Batt	Publicity
Naomi Loeb	Publicity
Mary Alyce Heaton	Business
