= Prince George Secondary School =

Location
- 2901 Griffiths Ave; Prince George, British Columbia, V2M 2S7; Canada; 53.9024°N 122.7788°W

Information
- School type: Public, high school
- Motto: PGSS The Place to Be!
- Founded: 1918
- School board: School District 57 Prince George
- School number: 5757036
- Principal: Randy Halpape
- Staff: 77
- Grades: 8-12
- Enrollment: 1313 (September 30, 2019)
- Language: English
- Team name: Prince George Polars
- Website: pgssweb.sd57.bc.ca

Prince George Secondary School is a public high school in Prince George, British Columbia, Canada, part of School District 57 Prince George.

== Timeline ==
- 1916 Two new schools replaced the elementary school, comprising three cottages, built in 1914 on Vancouver St. The four-room Prince George School on Winnipeg St included some high school students up to 1918. The two-room Millar Addition School on Queensway Ave initially had one elementary class.
- 1918 Prince George high school opened at the Queensway Ave property, and was often called the Millar Addition school. The Winnipeg St building became exclusively an elementary, but was vacated in 1922 when a new 8-room building opened to the northwest, which would later be known as King George V Elementary.
- 1925 The high school moved to the Winnipeg St building, which had been vacant 1922–1925.
- 1929: Renamed Baron Byng High. The former Millar Addition building provided overflow accommodation during the latter 1930s.
- 1939: A fire caused serious damage. The school temporarily relocated to the Millar Addition and King George buildings. The former remained as overflow accommodation until the mid-1940s.
- 1945: Moved to a new building on Ninth Ave, an L-shaped two-storey structure comprising 10 classrooms, a library and gym. Renamed Prince George Junior-Senior High. Former Baron Byng building used as overflow accommodation until mid-1950s. (In 1946, former Millar Addition building reopened as Connaught Elementary, which was destroyed in a 1951 fire.)
- 1946: Expanded from grades 9–12 to grades 7–13.
- 1947: School dormitory opened.
- 1948: Annex and other army surplus accommodation added behind main school for classrooms.
- 1952: Main building extended southward.
- 1954: Adopted school teams name "Polars".
- 1955: Junior and senior high administratively split, but junior grades remained in the Annex area until the following school year.
- 1956: Senior high moved to a new building on Ross Crescent, an L-shaped two-storey structure comprising 18 classrooms.
- 1962: Two-storey north wing added creating U-shaped configuration. School renamed Prince George Senior Secondary.
- 1968: Moved to new building on Griffiths Ave. Ross Crescent later used as temporary accommodation for various schools.
- 1974: Seven of the eight fatalities in a canoeing accident on the Willow River were students at the school.
- 200?: Name changed to Prince George Secondary School.

== Awards ==
For Grade 12 writers, the prize with the most prestige in the province may be the $1,500 first place award in University of British Columbia's Faculty of Arts essay contest. In 2000, out of 2,600 entries on the subject of Justice, the winner was Prince George's Alayna van Leeuwen.

== Health and safety ==
160 students are trained in Cardiopulmonary resuscitation each year.

== Abduction ==
A school bus taking students home was hijacked on February 13, 1990, with 13 students taken hostage. They were released unharmed. The three youths who carried out the hijacking were armed with sawed-off rifles. The driver received a bravery award.

== Extracurricular activities ==
The school presented a production of Canterbury Tales, in December 2007, at the Vanier Hall.

== Notable alumni ==
- Demetri Goritsas, film and television actor.
- Dave Rosin – guitar, backing vocals for the Canadian pop rock band Hedley.
- Steph St. Laurent, actor and documentary filmmaker.
- Jared Young, professional baseball player.
- Brian Fawcett, writer and cultural analyst.
