= Jared Young =

Canadian baseball player (born 1995)

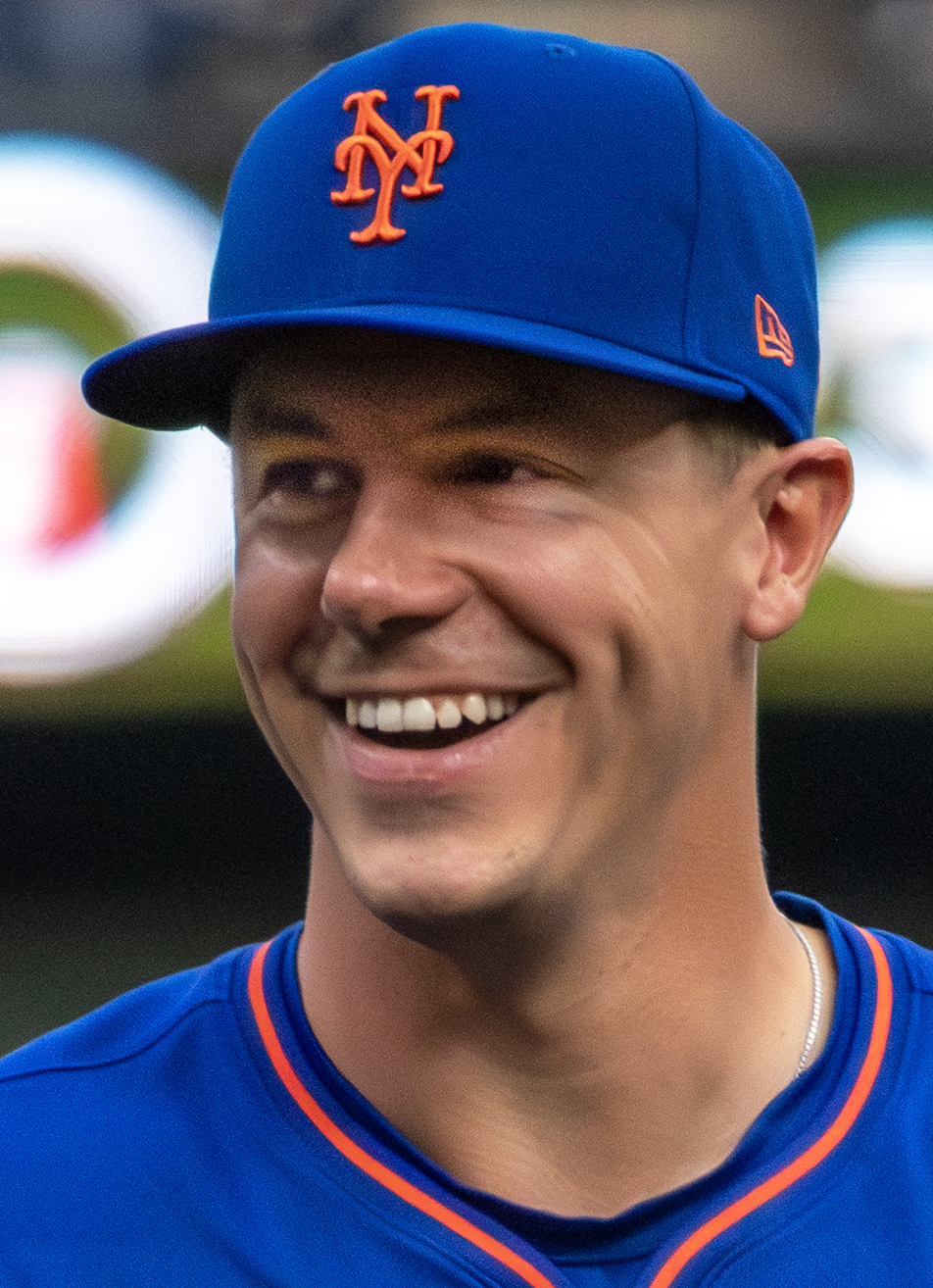
- Young with the New York Mets in 2026

New York Mets – No. 29
- Utility player
- Born: July 9, 1995 (age 31); Prince George, British Columbia, Canada
- Bats: Left Throws: Right

Professional debut
- MLB: September 16, 2022, for the Chicago Cubs
- KBO: July 30, 2024, for the Doosan Bears

MLB statistics (through 2026 season)
- Batting average: .249
- Home runs: 15
- Runs batted in: 53

KBO statistics (through 2024 season)
- Batting average: .326
- Home runs: 10
- Runs batted in: 51
- Stats at Baseball Reference

Teams
- Chicago Cubs (2022–2023); Doosan Bears (2024); New York Mets (2025–present)

Jared Michael Young (born July 9, 1995) is a Canadian professional baseball utility player for the New York Mets of Major League Baseball (MLB). He has played in MLB for the Chicago Cubs and in the KBO League for the Doosan Bears. He made his MLB debut in 2022. Young was drafted by the Cubs in the 15th round of the 2017 MLB draft.

== Amateur career ==
Young attended Prince George Secondary School in Prince George, British Columbia and Kelowna Secondary School in Kelowna, British Columbia. Young attended Minot State University his freshman year of college. Young hit .398 with 5 home runs and 35 RBI for the Beavers, earning all-conference second-team honors. Young transferred to Connors State College for his sophomore season, hitting .480 with 11 home runs and 54 RBI. After graduating from Connors State, Young next attended Old Dominion University, where he played college baseball for the Monarchs. Young hit .367 with 7 home runs and 34 RBI, earning ABCA/Rawlings All-American Third Team honors. Young was drafted by the Chicago Cubs in the 15th round, with the 465th overall selection, of the 2017 MLB draft.

== Professional career ==
=== Chicago Cubs ===
Young spent the 2017 season with the Eugene Emeralds, hitting .257/.311/.336 with 1 home run and 15 RBI. He split the 2018 season between the South Bend Cubs and the Myrtle Beach Pelicans, hitting a combined .300/.357/.485 with 16 home runs and 76 RBI. He was named the Cubs 2018 Minor League Player of the Year.

Young spent the 2019 season with the Tennessee Smokies, hitting .235/.287/.319 with 5 home runs and 47 RBI. Following the 2019 season, Young played in the Arizona Fall League for the Mesa Solar Sox. Young did not play in a game in 2020 due to the cancellation of the minor league season because of the COVID-19 pandemic.

He split the 2021 season between Tennessee and the Triple-A Iowa Cubs, slashing .290/.361/.471 with 9 home runs and 40 RBI. In 2022, Young spent the year with Iowa, appearing in 109 games and hitting .230/.311/.420 with 17 home runs and 59 RBI.

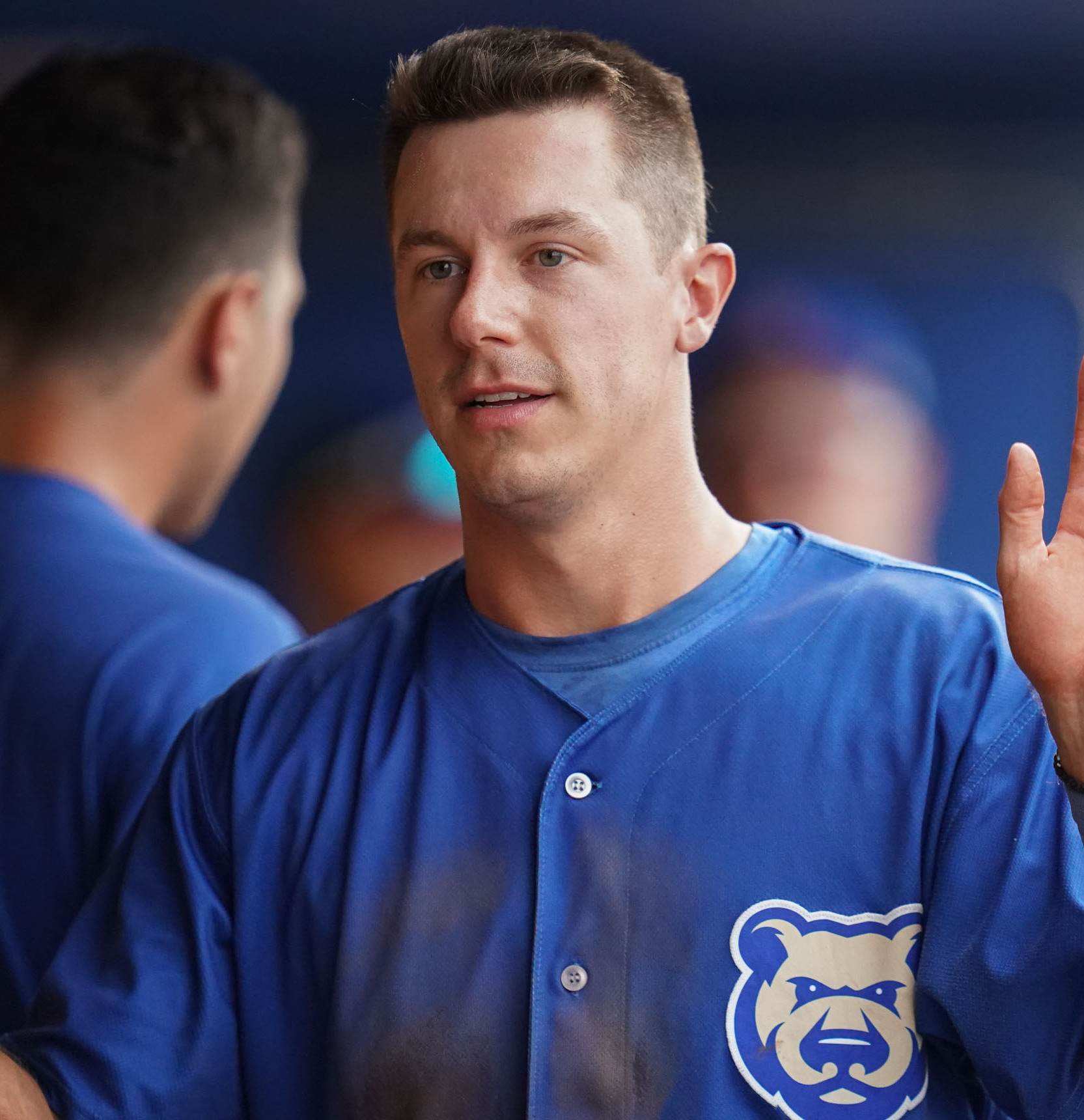
Young with the Iowa Cubs in 2022

On September 14, 2022, Young's contract was selected from Triple-A Iowa. Young made his MLB debut two days later against the Colorado Rockies, and collected his first career hit in the game, a double off Justin Lawrence. He was removed from the 40-man roster and sent outright to Triple–A Iowa on November 11.

Young began the 2023 season with Triple–A Iowa, playing in 52 games and hitting .326/.426/.605 with 13 home runs and 45 RBI. On June 27, 2023, Young had his contract selected to the 40-man roster, and assumed the active roster spot of Miles Mastrobuoni, who was optioned to Triple–A. On June 28, in his first at-bat of the season, Young hit his first major-league home run off of Aaron Nola of the Philadelphia Phillies. In 16 games for the Cubs, he hit .186/.255/.465 with 2 home runs, 8 RBI, and 2 stolen bases. Following the season on November 2, Young was removed from the 40–man roster and placed on outright waivers.

=== St. Louis Cardinals ===
On November 6, 2023, Young was claimed off waivers by the St. Louis Cardinals. He was optioned to the Triple–A Memphis Redbirds to begin the 2024 season. Young was removed from the 40–man roster and sent outright to Memphis on March 27, 2024. In 74 games for Memphis, he batted .285/.411/.506 with 11 home runs, 35 RBI, and 6 stolen bases.

=== Doosan Bears ===
On July 23, 2024, Young signed a $300,000 contract with the Doosan Bears of the KBO League. On July 31, Young went 5–for–6 with two home runs and eight RBI in a 30–6 victory over the Kia Tigers. His tally of eight RBI tied the record for most RBI in a game by a foreign player. For the season, he batted .326/.420/.660 with 10 home runs and 39 RBI in 38 games. Young became a free agent following the season.

=== New York Mets ===
On December 16, 2024, Young signed a one-year, major league contract with the New York Mets. He was optioned to the Triple-A Syracuse Mets to begin the 2025 season. On May 24, 2025, the Mets selected Young's contract, adding him to the big league roster. On June 15, Young pitched in a Major League game for the first time. He allowed one hit in 1/3 of an inning in a blowout loss against the Tampa Bay Rays. Young was sent back to Syracuse on June 27. However, on July 11, he was brought back to the majors. In 22 total appearances for the Mets, Young batted .186/.234/.488 with four home runs and six RBI.

On March 25, 2026, the Mets announced that Young had been selected for the Opening Day roster for the first time in his career. On April 15, the Mets announced that Young would require surgery to repair a meniscus tear in his left knee. Young had been batting .350/.391/.450 with two RBI and two runs scored in the 11 games leading up to his injury. On May 26, Young was reinstated from the injured list and returned to the Mets lineup. On September 18, while trying to field a ground ball, Young collided with Mets pitcher Nolan McLean and was knocked unconscious. Young was carted off of the field, and later tests showed the crash resulted in a concussion and minor memory loss, effectively ending his season.

Across 103 games in 2026, Young batted .266/.330/.429 with career-highs in home runs (9), RBI (39), runs scored (46), and hits (82).
