= Steph St. Laurent =

- St. Laurent in November 2011
- Born: April 4, 1971 (age 55); Prince George, British Columbia
- Education: Prince George Secondary School (PGSS)
- Alma mater: University of Northern British Columbia (UNBC)
- Occupations: Film director, producer, editor
- Years active: 2004 – present
- Organization: VideoNexus Productions
- Style: Documentary, science fiction
- Website: videonexus.ca

Steph St. Laurent (born April 4, 1971) is a Canadian documentary filmmaker, videographer, photographer, actor, writer, environmentalist and activist. He has produced numerous documentary and educational films and is the owner of VideoNexus, a video production company in Prince George, British Columbia.

== Early life ==
St. Laurent was born and raised in and around Prince George, British Columbia. He completed secondary school at Prince George Secondary School (PGSS), with a focus on arts. After graduation, he began working in community theatre and technical work. He also attended various classes at the University of Northern British Columbia.

== Career ==
St. Laurent’s best-known work is the film "Amazay: A Film About Water" (2009), which explores the Tse Keh Nay First Nations' battle against Northgate Minerals’ proposed dumping of 750 million tonnes of acid tailings into a pristine lake in Tse Keh Nay territory.

Through his work as a facilitator and play creator with the Street Spirits Theatre Company (1999 – 2005), St. Laurent co-directed, filmed, and edited several films for the theatre company: "Cycles", "Streetwise", "Jibb", and "Eye of the Storm".

In 2004, he directed and produced "The Web of Life", a film that was used to help people moving from a First Nations reserve, to help them understand and cope with this transition. In 2005, he filmed and compiled a music video for musician Marcel Gagnon’s song, "The Last Dance". He has produced numerous other music videos as well, composed of time-lapse footage he has filmed and set to the music of British Columbian musician Gordon McGladdery. He also worked as cinematographer for the band Good Old Heisenberg, on an experimental project they conducted exploring the influence of observers on musical performance.

St. Laurent worked as letterer to create "Scar Tissue", a 5-part comic book series. He also worked as letterer on the comic "Touched" (2005). Other comic works of his, in a writer/creator capacity, include "IMPH" (in Heavy Metal Magazine) and "Blammo the Space Monkey" (in Digital Webbing). St. Laurent created several other short comics published in Digital Webbing as well.

In 2008, St. Laurent directed and produced the film "We are Métis", a film exploring the identity of the Métis people. In 2009, he co-wrote, directed and filmed "Close Quarters", a sci-fi film that explored “the human, personal conflict provoked by space travel and isolation”. In 2011, he worked as videographer and a member of the lighting crew for the play "Rollback" (2011).

== Acting ==
St. Laurent was a member of the theatre troupe Street Spirits from 1999 – 2005, where he acted in a wide variety of plays and other theatre performances. In 2001, he wrote and acted in the skit, "Here Puppy", a performance that was part of the Greenroom Comedy Festival in Prince George, British Columbia. He has acted in numerous plays as a member of the Prince George Theatre Workshop, including "Cinderella" (1999), "An Evening of Monty Python & Friends" (2000), "Charlie and the Chocolate Factory" (2001), "Monty Python Rides Again" (2002), "The Real Inspector Hound" (2003), "A Christmas Adventure" (2003), "Simon" (2004), and "Laughter on the 23rd Floor" (2004). In August 2011, he acted in the improve comedy debate show "War of Wits", which was performed at UdderFest, a theatre festival held in Prince Rupert, British Columbia. In October 2011, he acted in "This is for Mrs Zaberewsky", a play performed at VCON. He currently acts in an improvisational theatre troupe, Improv Ad Nauseum [sic], which he has been with since 2005.

== Activism ==
St. Laurent is passionate about environmental conservation and activism. One issue he is currently very concerned with is the proposed Enbridge Northern Gateway Pipelines project, which would run a pipeline from Alberta to Kitimat, British Columbia. This proposed pipeline is strongly opposed by many BC residents, as it would put at risk some of the region’s most pristine areas of nature, such as the Great Bear Rainforest, should there be an oil spill. St. Laurent spoke on the issue of sustainability at an Occupy Prince George rally in October 2011.

== Recognition and awards ==
St. Laurent was awarded a Certificate of Appreciation in 2006, in recognition of his film work to help end violence against women. In 2011, he was honoured with an invitation to be a guest panelist at the ArtsWells, an arts festival held annually in Wells, British Columbia. The ArtsWells festival promotes and involves artists from all disciplines across British Columbia, through a variety of workshops, performances, and exhibitions. At this event, he presented, and discussed the making of, his film "Amazay".

== Memberships ==
St. Laurent has been a member of the Federation of BC Writers since 2000. He was a member of the Fringe Festival Association for several years, and served as President of the Association in 2000. He was a member and organizer of The Greenroom Comedy Festival from 1999-2006.

== Personal life ==
St. Laurent currently lives in Prince George, British Columbia. He is interested in a sustainable, self-sufficient lifestyle and is currently working on developing an aquaponics greenhouse for food production. He has produced a series of YouTube video-blogs documenting his aquaponics project. He enjoys pursuing photography as hobby, as well as part of his business, especially nature and wildlife photography.

== Filmography ==
- Cycles: A Film About Drugs (2004)
- Web of Life (2004)
- Streetwise (2004)
- Jibb (2005)
- Eye of the Storm (2005)
- Crossing the Line: A Primer on Harassment (2005)
- Commander’s Log (2007)
- Fort Steele Heritage Town (2007)
- Where the Heart Is: FASD and Other Parenting Challenges (2007)
- We are Metis (2008)
- HIV: If There's a Will...(2008)
- Victim Services Prince George (2008)
- Amazay: A Film About Water (2009)
- Close Quarters (2009)
- Welcome Back (2011)
- Healthy Land, Healthy Future (2011)
