= May Gutteridge =

English-Canadian social worker

May Cecelia Gutteridge, CM (May 21, 1917 – February 26, 2002), one of Canada's early and most celebrated social workers, was born in Gosport, Hampshire, England, the youngest of four children of Ernest and Polly Symonds. Raised in a devout Christian home, she married Arthur Gutteridge, a school teacher, during WW2 on March 23, 1940, dressed in her Women's Royal Naval Service uniform. The couple had three children, Sonia, Michael and Lance. They immigrated to Canada settling in Prairie River, Saskatchewan, in 1955.

Even though May was a busy mother and housewife, while in Saskatchewan, she engaged in numerous community activities. She ran a Scouting group, did substitute teaching, developed a kindergarten, supervised a 4-H club, and reopened a school in this remote area for the small group of children who could not get schooling anywhere else.

The family moved to Vancouver, British Columbia, in 1958 where she became a regular worshipper at St. James' Anglican Church in Vancouver's Downtown East Side (DTES). It was there, in one of the poorest neighbourhoods in Canada, where her unparalleled story of outreach and care for the homeless, the poor and forgotten started.

May began looking after seniors in the church's basement and then formed St. James Social Service Society in 1961, the Home Help program in 1962, and the first shelter for abused women in the Downtown Eastside named The East Ender's Society in 1965.

At the same time she organized free legal aid, the Gastown Workshop, a cheque administration program for social assistance clients and later residential housing for seniors (1983) and the first free-standing hospice in British Columbia (1990).

Her work has been formally acknowledged by being awarded the Order of Canada by being invested as a Member, and by receiving the BC Senior Citizen of the year Award, the Silver Eagle Feather Award, the Pioneer Award, an honorary Doctorate of Laws from Simon Fraser University, the Chinatown Lioness Club Ambassador Award, the Certificate of Merit and the Chinatown Rotary Club Award.

At the time of her death, St. James' Community Service Society (now called The Bloom Group Social Service Society) had become one of the largest social service agencies in Vancouver with 250 employees and an annual budget of $10 million. May Gutteridge never received an income for her many years of service.
