= Talonbooks =

Canadian independent publishing company

- Founded: 1963
- Founder: David Robinson
- Country of origin: Canada
- Headquarters location: Vancouver, British Columbia
- Distribution: Publishers Group Canada (Canada); Consortium Book Sales & Distribution (US)
- Nonfiction topics: Social issues, environmental, ethnography, literary criticism
- Fiction genres: Poetry, fiction, drama
- Official website: talonbooks.com

Talonbooks is an independent publisher of Canadian literature based in Vancouver, British Columbia. Its repertoire features authors writing in the literary genres of poetry, fiction and drama, as well as non-fiction books in the fields of ethnography, environmental and social issues, cultural studies, and literary criticism. Notable Talonbooks authors include Michel Tremblay, George Ryga, bpNichol, George Bowering, bill bissett, Daphne Marlatt, George F. Walker, M.A.C. Farrant and Mary Meigs.

The company started as a magazine called Talon in 1963. It was run by David Robinson and some of his high-school friends. It later incorporated Jim Brown, who acted as both a writer and editor for the publication. Talon later joined with a small local press called Very Stone House and published its first string of poetry books in 1967. The association with Very Stone House ended a year later, and the Talonbooks imprint started appearing by itself.

In 1969, with the addition of Peter Háy as drama editor, Talonbooks published its first drama title, Colours in the Dark, by James Reaney. Its editorial focus began shifting gradually more toward drama until that became the company's area of specialization.

Karl Siegler joined Talonbooks in 1974 and later became its president and publisher. Karl and Christy Siegler ran the press until December 31, 2007, when it was acquired by Kevin and Vicki Williams (though Siegler remained with the company until the end of 2011).
