= Cornelia Hoogland =

Canadian poet

- Born: c. 1952
- Occupation: Poet
- Writing career
- Notable awards: Adjudicators Choice Award

Cornelia Hoogland is a Canadian poet, playwright and retired professor. She lived on Hornby Island, British Columbia, Canada, but until 2011 divided her time between London, Ontario as well, where she was a professor at the University of Western Ontario. Hoogland has performed and worked internationally in the areas of poetry and theatre. In 2004, she founded and was the director until 2011 of Antler River Poetry (formerly Poetry London), a poetry reading and workshop series.

== Works ==
=== Poetry ===
Woods Wolf Girl (Wolsak and Wynn, 2011) is Hoogland's 6th book of poetry, and is based on the fairy tale, Red Riding Hood. Crow (Black Moss Press), was also released in 2011. Her 2012 chapbook, Gravelly Bay (Alfred Gustav Press, 2012), is set at the ferry terminal on Denman Island. In 2017, her poem "Tourists Stroll a Victoria Waterway" was one of five poems named to the shortlist of the CBC Poetry Prize. Hoogland was a 2020/2021 featured poet as a part of Books BC's Poetry in Transit, which displays work by British Columbian poets on TransLink and BC Transit vehicles. The featured poem was "P'i, Standstill" from her collection Cosmic Bowling.

=== Theater ===
Hoogland adapted Woods Wolf Girl for stage as Faim de Loup, which was dramaturged by Gil Garret and Susan Ferley and included in the 2012 PlayWrights Cabaret at the Grand Theatre in London, Ontario. Faim de Loup was selected for inclusion in the 2012 Women Playwrights International Conference, and performed as Talking in Bed.

Hoogland's play, Country of my Skin won the Adjudicators' Choice Award at the London One-Act Festival in 2004, Lesleigh Turner, Director. Janice Johnston directed the same play for In Good Company at the Aeolian Hall in October 2006 and in November 2006 "Country" traveled to Jakarta, Indonesia, to the Women Playwrights International conference. Her published play for children – Salmonberry: A West Coast Fairy Tale (International Plays for Young Audiences, Meriwether, 2000) – was performed at the 1999 International Women Playwrights Conference in Athens.

== Bibliography ==
- The Wire - Thin Bride - 1990
- Marrying the Animals - 1995
- You are Home - 2001
- Cuba Journal: Language and Writing - 2003
- Second Marriage. Canadian Poetry Association, 2005 ISBN 1-55253-061-2
- Woods Wolf Girl - Wolsak and Wynn, 2011
- Crow - Black Moss Press, 2011
- Trailer Park Elegy - Harbour, 2017
- Cosmic Bowling - Guernica Editions, 2020 (With Ted Goodden)

== Awards ==
In 2023, Hoogland was awarded the Colleen Thibaudeau Award along with Flavia Cosma for her outstanding contribution to Canadian poetry.
