= Don Gutteridge (writer) =

Canadian writer (born 1937)

Donald George Gutteridge (born 30 September 1937) is a Canadian author of poetry, fiction and scholarly works. He is also professor emeritus at the University of Western Ontario.

== Biography ==
Don Gutteridge was born in Sarnia, Ontario in 1937, and was raised in the nearby village of Point Edward, Ontario. His high schooling took place in Sarnia and Chatham, Ontario. He attended the University of Western Ontario (UWO), where he graduated with a BA Honours in English in 1960. After graduating, Gutteridge taught high school English for seven years before joining the Faculty of Education at UWO in 1969. He is currently Professor Emeritus. In 1970 he won the UWO President's Medal for his poem "Death at Quebec." Poet John B. Lee, winner of 50 poetry prizes, called Gutteridge a "major poet." " One reviewer, Jack Magnus, said Gutteridge _has a divine gift <https://www.goodreads.com/author/list/192009.Don_Gutteridge> He lives in London, Ontario He has two children, John and Kate, and six grandchildren.

== Published works ==
=== Poetry ===
- Riel: A Poem For Voices. Fiddlehead Poetry Books: Fredericton, 1968; and Van Nostrand Reinhold: Toronto, 1972.
- The Village Within. Fiddlehead: Fredericton, 1970.
- Death at Quebec and Other Poems. Fiddlehead: Fredericton, 1971.
- "Perspectives: Poems Toward a Biography." Pennywise Press, London, Ontario, 1971.
- Saying Grace: An Elegy. Fiddlehead: Fredericton, 1972.
- Coppermine: The Quest For North. Oberon: Ottawa, 1973.
- Borderlands. Oberon: Ottawa, 1975.
- Tecumseh. Oberon: Ottawa, 1976.
- A True History of Lambton County. Oberon: Ottawa, 1977.
- God's Geography. Brick Books: London, 1982.
- The Exiled Heart; Selected Narratives. Oberon: Ottawa, 1986.
- Love in the Wintertime. Oberon: Ottawa, 1990.
- Flute Music in the Cello's Belly. Moonstone: Goderich, 1997.
- Bloodlines. Oberon: Ottawa, 2001.
- Something More Miraculous. Oberon: Ottawa, 2004.
- Still Magical. Oberon: Ottawa, 2007.
- Coming Home. Oberon: Ottawa, 2011.
- The Way It Was. Friesen Press: Vancouver, 2014.
- Tidings. Black Moss Press: Windsor, 2015.
- Peripheries. (ebook) -privately printed 2016.
- Inundations. Hidden Brook Press: Brighton, 2016.
- The Blue Flow Below. Black Moss Press: Windsor, 2017.
- The Sands of Canatara (ebook) privately printed, 2017.
- Inklings: Black Moss Press: Windsor, 2017.
- The Village Within (re-issue, ebook)) First Choice Books: Victoria, 2017.
- Cameron Lake (ebook) privately printed, 2018.
- Home Ground: Hidden Brook Press, 2018.
- "Two Dozen for Anne, First Choice books, Victoria, 2018
- "Bereft: Poems for my Beloved," privately printed, 2018.
- "Another Poem For Anne," privately printed, 2018.
- "Days Worth the Telling," Black Moss Press, Windsor, 2018.
- "The Breath of My Being," privately printed, 2018.
- "Foster's Pond," Borealis, Ottawa, 2019
- "The Star-Brushed Horizon,' Hidden Brook Press, 2019.
- "Mara's Lamp," Black Moss Press. 2019.
- Impious Whims: Selected Poems." Borealis Press, 2019.
- "In the Rarefied Regions of the Heart". Hidden Brook Press, 2020.
- "Point Taken: Collected Poems 2014-2020." Hidden Brook Press, 202

• "By and By". With John B. Lee. Hidden Brook Press 2020. • "The Derelict Heart". Hidden Brook Press: 2020. • "Invincible Ink." Hidden Brook Press, 2020. • "Into the Milkweed Meadow." Hidden Brook Press, 2021. • "Where Rivers Run Deep." Hidden Brook Press, 2021. • "More Boding Than Blood." Hidden Brook Press, 2021. . "The Ardent Dark," Hidden Brook Press, 2021. → "Masters of the Craft." Hidden Brook Press:2021. " Lover's Moon" Hidden Brook Press: 2022 . "The Home We Never Leave" Wet Ink Books: 2022 . "Kingdom Come and Other Poems: Wet Ink Books: 2022

- "Trawling For Truths": Wet Ink Books: 2022

. "A Fine-Tuned Heart" Wet Ink Books: 2023

=== Fiction ===
- Bus-Ride. Nairn publishing: Nairn, 1974.
- All in Good Time. Black Moss: Windsor, 1980.
- St. Vitus Dance. Drumlin: London, 1986.
- Shaman's Ground. Drumlin: London, 1988.
- How the World Began. Moonstone: Goderich, 1991.
- Summer's Idyll. Oberon: Ottawa, 1993.
- Winter's Descent. Oberon: Ottawa, 1996.
- Bewilderment. Borealis: Ottawa, 2000.
- The Perilous Journey of Gavin the Great. Borealis Press: Ottawa, 2010.
- The Rebellion Mysteries. Simon and Schuster: Toronto, 2012.
- Lily's Story.(e-book). Bev Editions: Toronto, 2013 (Print edition 2014)
- Constable Garrett and the Dead Ringer. Tellwell: Victoria, 2016
- Lily Fairchild - Tablo publishing 2019.

Marc Edwards Mysteries

1. Turncoat. McClelland and Stewart: Toronto, 2003.
2. Solemn Vows. McClelland and Stewart: Toronto, 2003.
3. Vital Secrets. Trinity: Saint John, 2007.
4. Dubious Allegiance. Simon and Schuster: Toronto, 2012.
5. Bloody Relations. Simon and Schuster: Toronto, 2013.
6. Death of a Patriot. Simon and Schuster: Toronto, 2014.
7. The Bishop's Pawn. Tablo Publishing: Melbourne, 2021;
8. Desperate Acts. Tablo Publishing: Melbourne, 2021
9. Unholy Alliance. Tablo Publishing: Melbourne, 2021.
10. Mnor Corruption Tablo Publishing: Melbourne, 2021
11. Governing Passion Tablo Publishing: Melbourne, 2021
12. The Widow's Demise Tablo Publishing: Melbourne, 2021.

The six mysteries above were also published as ebooks by Bev Editions in 2015.

=== Non-Fiction ===
- Rhetoric: A Unified Approach to Literary Curricula. OISE: Toronto, 1970 (contributor)
- Language and Expression. McClelland and Stewart: Toronto, 1970.
- The Country of the Young. The Althouse Press: London, 1978.
- Mountain and Plain. Anthology. McClelland and Stewart: Toronto, 1978.
- Rites of Passage. Anthology. McClelland and Stewart: Toronto, 1979.
- Brave Season. The Althouse Press: London, 1983.
- Incredible Journeys. The Althouse Press: London, 1986 and 1990.
- The Dimension of Delight. The Althouse Press: London, 1988.
- Stubborn Pilgrimage. Our Schools/Our Selves: Toronto, 1994.
- Teaching English. Lorimer: Toronto, 2000.
- The Myth Alive: Essays in Canadian Literature and Poetics. First Choice Books: Victoria, 2015

. reissued as "Ploughing the Home Ground," Hidden Brook Press: Brighton, Ontario, 2022.

=== Articles ===
ARTICLES

"The Subject-Centred Curriculum: Last Chance or Lost Cause?", The English Quarterly, vol. 4, no. 4 (Fall, 1971). "The Affective Fallacy and the Student's Response to Poetry", English Journal LXI, 2 (February, 1972) "Teaching the Canadian Mythology: A Poet's View", Journal of Canadian Studies, vol. VII, no. 1, February, 1973. "The Hidden Meaning Syndrome," The English Quarterly, vol IX, nos. 1 and 2. "Some Principles of Question-Design", English Journal Vol. 70 # 7 (Nov. 1981) "Truth and Consequences: Selecting Literature for Grades 7-12/OAC", indirections17, 1 (March 1992) "Teaching Canadian Literature: A Cultural Odyssey", indirections Vol. VI, no. 2 (Spring 1981) "Teaching Literature for Cognitive Development: A Double Perspective", indirections VI, 3 (Fall 1981) "Literature and Reading in the High School: The Cognitive Dimensions", indirections VII, 2 (Spring 1982) "The View from Darien: The Drama of Literature in the High School Classroom – Part 1", The English Quarterly XV, 1 (Spring 1982) "The View from Darien: The Drama of Literature in the High School Classroom, Part 2," The English Quarterly, XV 2 (Summer 1982). "Homage to the Past-Future", Brick #15 (Spring 1982) "Regions of the Heart: The Politics of Literature in Canada", HSST, Vol. 17 # 3 (Spring 1982) "Local Colour, Communal Consciousness, and Loretta Lynn: A Recantation", Contemporary Verse II, Vol. 7 #1 (Nov. 1982) "Setting Goals for English: A Model and Several Cautions", The English Quarterly, 1983. "Shakespeare by Ear: Macbeth Through Listening and Discussion", The English Quarterly. "A Unit in Indian Mythology for Grade Seven", Classmate (MATE). "Local Culture and the National Will", Canadian Literature #100 (Spring 1984) "Old Photographs and the Documentary Archive", Canadian Literature #113 (Summer 1988) "Literature Teaching in Ontario Since 1950: A Preliminary Sketch", indirections (Jan. 1990) "The Process of Reading Fiction: A Modest Hypothesis", Indirections, 16, 3 (Sep. 1991) "Truth and Consequences: Selecting Literature for Grades 7-12/OAC; Part One: The Rudderless Arc, indirections, Vol. 17, No. 1, April 1992. "Stubborn Pilgrimage:B. C Diltz and the Ontario Tradition, Part I: His Master's Vocie, B. C. Diltz and the Literary Method 1931-1958," indirections, Vol. 17 No. 4. Stubborn Pilgrimage: B. C. Diltz and the Ontario Tradition, Part II, Cold Pastoral: The Diltzian Paradigm Before 1960," indirections, Vol. 18 No.1. "Stubborn Pilgrimage: B. C. Diltz and the Ontario Tradition, Part III, Parnassus Under Siege: Literary Method in the Age of Aquarius," indirections, Vol. 18 No.2. "Stubborn Pilgrimage: B. C. Diltz and the Ontario Tradition, Part IV: Resistance and Transformation 1969-1977," indirections Vol. 18 No. 3. "Stubborn Pilgrimage: B. C. Diltz and the Ontario Tradition, Part V: The Great Divide, 1977-84," Indirections Vol. 19 No. 1. "Education for an Unchanging Society", The OSSTF Bulletin (Dec. 1973) "Rethinking Reading: A Quiet Revolution Returns Literature to the Curriculum", Quill & Quire (May 1983) "Five Ways to Improve High School Learning", London Free Press, 2 April 1998 "$6 Million Math, English Tests Won't Tell Us a Thing, London Free Press

== Awards ==
- The President's Medal, The University of Western Ontario: Best Periodical Poem, 1972.
- Short-listed for the 1973 Governor General's Award: Coppermine.
